= 1988 Talladega DieHard 500 =

17th race of the 1988 NASCAR Winston Cup Series

Race details
- Race 17 of 29 in the 1988 NASCAR Winston Cup Series
- The 1988 Talladega DieHard 500 program cover, featuring Bill Elliott.
- Date: July 31, 1988
- Official name: 20th Annual Talladega DieHard 500
- Location: Lincoln, Alabama, Alabama International Motor Speedway
- Course: Permanent racing facility
- Course length: 2.66 miles (4.28 km)
- Distance: 188 laps, 500.08 mi (804.8 km)
- Scheduled distance: 188 laps, 500.08 mi (804.8 km)
- Average speed: 154.505 miles per hour (248.652 km/h)
- Attendance: 80,000

Pole position
Driver	Darrell Waltrip	Hendrick Motorsports
- Time: 48.789

Most laps led
Driver	Darrell Waltrip	Hendrick Motorsports
- Laps: 123

Winner
No. 25	Ken Schrader	Hendrick Motorsports

Television in the United States
- Network: CBS
- Announcers: Ken Squier, Ned Jarrett, Chris Economaki

Radio in the United States
- Radio: Motor Racing Network

The 1988 Talladega DieHard 500 was the 17th stock car race of the 1988 NASCAR Winston Cup Series season and the 20th iteration of the event. The race was held on Sunday, July 31, 1988, before an audience of 80,000 in Lincoln, Alabama at Alabama International Motor Speedway, a 2.66 miles (4.28 km) permanent triangle-shaped superspeedway. The race took the scheduled 188 laps to complete. On the final lap of the race, Hendrick Motorsports driver Ken Schrader would manage to make a pass for the lead coming out of the track's second turn, holding onto the lead for the rest of the lap to take the victory. The victory was Schrader's first career NASCAR Winston Cup Series victory and his only victory of the season. To fill out the top three, Hendrick Motorsports driver Geoff Bodine and Richard Childress Racing driver Dale Earnhardt would finish second and third, respectively.

== Background ==
The layout of Talladega Superspeedway, the venue where the race was held.

Talladega Superspeedway, originally known as Alabama International Motor Superspeedway (AIMS), is a motorsports complex located north of Talladega, Alabama. It is located on the former Anniston Air Force Base in the small city of Lincoln. The track is a tri-oval and was constructed in the 1960s by the International Speedway Corporation, a business controlled by the France family. Talladega is most known for its steep banking and the unique location of the start/finish line that's located just past the exit to pit road. The track currently hosts the NASCAR series such as the NASCAR Cup Series, Xfinity Series and the Camping World Truck Series. Talladega is the longest NASCAR oval, a 2.66-mile-long (4.28 km) tri-oval like the Daytona International Speedway, which also is a 2.5-mile-long (4.0 km) tri-oval.

=== Entry list ===
- (R) denotes rookie driver.

#	Driver	Team	Make
0	Delma Cowart	H. L. Waters Racing	Chevrolet
1	Dale Jarrett	Ellington Racing	Buick
01	Mickey Gibbs	Gibbs Racing	Ford
2	Ernie Irvan (R)	U.S. Racing	Chevrolet
3	Dale Earnhardt	Richard Childress Racing	Chevrolet
4	Rick Wilson	Morgan–McClure Motorsports	Oldsmobile
5	Geoff Bodine	Hendrick Motorsports	Chevrolet
6	Mark Martin	Roush Racing	Ford
7	Alan Kulwicki	AK Racing	Ford
07	Larry Moyer	Stark Racing	Pontiac
8	Bobby Hillin Jr.	Stavola Brothers Racing	Buick
9	Bill Elliott	Melling Racing	Ford
10	Ken Bouchard (R)	Whitcomb Racing	Ford
11	Terry Labonte	Junior Johnson & Associates	Chevrolet
12	Mike Alexander	Stavola Brothers Racing	Buick
14	A. J. Foyt	A. J. Foyt Racing	Oldsmobile
15	Brett Bodine	Bud Moore Engineering	Ford
17	Darrell Waltrip	Hendrick Motorsports	Chevrolet
21	Kyle Petty	Wood Brothers Racing	Ford
23	Eddie Bierschwale	B&B Racing	Oldsmobile
25	Ken Schrader	Hendrick Motorsports	Chevrolet
26	Ricky Rudd	King Racing	Buick
27	Rusty Wallace	Blue Max Racing	Pontiac
28	Davey Allison	Ranier-Lundy Racing	Ford
29	Cale Yarborough	Cale Yarborough Motorsports	Oldsmobile
30	Michael Waltrip	Bahari Racing	Pontiac
31	Joe Ruttman	Bob Clark Motorsports	Oldsmobile
32	Philip Duffie	Duffie Racing	Buick
33	Harry Gant	Mach 1 Racing	Chevrolet
43	Richard Petty	Petty Enterprises	Pontiac
44	Sterling Marlin	Hagan Racing	Oldsmobile
50	Greg Sacks	Dingman Brothers Racing	Pontiac
52	Jimmy Means	Jimmy Means Racing	Pontiac
55	Phil Parsons	Jackson Bros. Motorsports	Oldsmobile
59	Mark Gibson	Gibson Racing	Pontiac
67	Ron Esau	Arrington Racing	Ford
68	Derrike Cope	Testa Racing	Ford
70	J. D. McDuffie	McDuffie Racing	Pontiac
71	Dave Marcis	Marcis Auto Racing	Chevrolet
73	Phil Barkdoll	Barkdoll Racing	Ford
75	Morgan Shepherd	RahMoc Enterprises	Pontiac
76	Hut Stricklin	Jaehne Motorsports	Pontiac
77	Ken Ragan	Ragan Racing	Ford
83	Lake Speed	Speed Racing	Oldsmobile
86	Rick Jeffrey	Jeffrey Racing	Chevrolet
88	Buddy Baker	Baker-Schiff Racing	Oldsmobile
90	Benny Parsons	Donlavey Racing	Ford
95	Slick Johnson	Sadler Brothers Racing	Chevrolet
97	Rodney Combs	Winkle Motorsports	Buick
98	Brad Noffsinger (R)	Curb Racing	Buick

== Qualifying ==
Qualifying was split into two rounds. The first round was held on Thursday, July 28, at 2:00 PM EST. Each driver would have one lap to set a time. During the first round, the top 20 drivers in the round would be guaranteed a starting spot in the race. If a driver was not able to guarantee a spot in the first round, they had the option to scrub their time from the first round and try and run a faster lap time in a second round qualifying run, held on Friday, July 29, at 2:00 PM EST. As with the first round, each driver would have one lap to set a time. For this specific race, positions 21-40 would be decided on time, and depending on who needed it, a select amount of positions were given to cars who had not otherwise qualified but were high enough in owner's points; up to two were given.

Darrell Waltrip, driving for Hendrick Motorsports, would win the pole, setting a time of 48.789 and an average speed of 196.274 miles per hour (315.872 km/h) in the first round.

Eight drivers would fail to qualify.

=== Full qualifying results ===
Pos.	#	Driver	Team	Make	Time	Speed
1	17	Darrell Waltrip	Hendrick Motorsports	Chevrolet	48.789	196.274
2	44	Sterling Marlin	Hagan Racing	Oldsmobile	49.275	194.338
3	28	Davey Allison	Ranier-Lundy Racing	Ford	49.309	194.204
4	5	Geoff Bodine	Hendrick Motorsports	Chevrolet	49.362	193.995
5	75	Morgan Shepherd	RahMoc Enterprises	Pontiac	49.376	193.940
6	3	Dale Earnhardt	Richard Childress Racing	Chevrolet	49.475	193.552
7	25	Ken Schrader	Hendrick Motorsports	Chevrolet	49.531	193.333
8	9	Bill Elliott	Melling Racing	Ford	49.684	192.738
9	26	Ricky Rudd	King Racing	Buick	49.691	192.711
10	50	Greg Sacks	Dingman Brothers Racing	Pontiac	49.692	192.707
11	8	Bobby Hillin Jr.	Stavola Brothers Racing	Buick	49.771	192.401
12	55	Phil Parsons	Jackson Bros. Motorsports	Oldsmobile	49.796	192.305
13	21	Kyle Petty	Wood Brothers Racing	Ford	49.881	191.977
14	88	Buddy Baker	Baker–Schiff Racing	Oldsmobile	49.927	191.800
15	12	Mike Alexander	Stavola Brothers Racing	Buick	49.969	191.639
16	29	Cale Yarborough	Cale Yarborough Motorsports	Oldsmobile	49.982	191.589
17	14	A. J. Foyt	A. J. Foyt Racing	Oldsmobile	50.041	191.363
18	33	Harry Gant	Mach 1 Racing	Chevrolet	50.052	191.321
19	01	Mickey Gibbs	Gibbs Racing	Ford	50.120	191.061
20	6	Mark Martin	Roush Racing	Ford	50.218	190.689
Failed to lock in Round 1
21	11	Terry Labonte	Junior Johnson & Associates	Chevrolet	50.146	190.962
22	27	Rusty Wallace	Blue Max Racing	Pontiac	50.340	190.226
23	52	Jimmy Means	Jimmy Means Racing	Pontiac	50.351	190.185
24	23	Eddie Bierschwale	B&B Racing	Oldsmobile	50.454	189.797
25	4	Rick Wilson	Morgan–McClure Motorsports	Oldsmobile	50.500	189.624
26	1	Dale Jarrett	Ellington Racing	Buick	50.500	189.624
27	30	Michael Waltrip	Bahari Racing	Pontiac	50.568	189.369
28	97	Rodney Combs	Winkle Motorsports	Buick	50.604	189.234
29	67	Ron Esau	Arrington Racing	Chevrolet	50.611	189.208
30	83	Lake Speed	Speed Racing	Oldsmobile	50.701	188.872
31	2	Ernie Irvan (R)	U.S. Racing	Chevrolet	50.702	188.868
32	7	Alan Kulwicki	Mach 1 Racing	Ford	50.713	188.827
33	15	Brett Bodine	Bud Moore Engineering	Ford	50.768	188.623
34	43	Richard Petty	Petty Enterprises	Pontiac	50.832	188.385
35	31	Joe Ruttman	Bob Clark Motorsports	Oldsmobile	50.919	188.063
36	77	Ken Ragan	Ragan Racing	Ford	50.937	187.997
37	71	Dave Marcis	Marcis Auto Racing	Chevrolet	50.943	187.975
38	73	Phil Barkdoll	Barkdoll Racing	Chevrolet	50.971	187.872
39	10	Ken Bouchard (R)	Whitcomb Racing	Ford	51.094	187.419
40	98	Brad Noffsinger (R)	Curb Racing	Buick	51.124	187.309
Provisionals
41	90	Benny Parsons	Donlavey Racing	Ford	52.355	182.905
42	68	Derrike Cope	Testa Racing	Ford	52.181	183.515
Failed to qualify
43	07	Larry Moyer	Stark Racing	Pontiac	51.133	187.276
44	95	Slick Johnson	Sadler Brothers Racing	Chevrolet	51.210	186.995
45	86	Rick Jeffrey	Jeffrey Racing	Chevrolet	51.443	186.148
46	0	Delma Cowart	H. L. Waters Racing	Chevrolet	51.452	186.115
47	76	Hut Stricklin	Jaehne Motorsports	Pontiac	51.626	185.488
48	59	Mark Gibson	Gibson Racing	Pontiac	52.029	184.051
49	32	Philip Duffie	Duffie Racing	Buick	-	-
50	70	J. D. McDuffie	McDuffie Racing	Pontiac	-	-
Official first round qualifying results
Official starting lineup

== Race results ==
Fin	St	#	Driver	Team	Make	Laps	Led	Status	Pts	Winnings
1	7	25	Ken Schrader	Hendrick Motorsports	Chevrolet	188	8	running	180	$67,920
2	4	5	Geoff Bodine	Hendrick Motorsports	Chevrolet	188	0	running	170	$39,915
3	6	3	Dale Earnhardt	Richard Childress Racing	Chevrolet	188	37	running	170	$37,775
4	25	4	Rick Wilson	Morgan–McClure Motorsports	Oldsmobile	188	0	running	160	$20,075
5	22	27	Rusty Wallace	Blue Max Racing	Pontiac	188	0	running	155	$23,215
6	2	44	Sterling Marlin	Hagan Racing	Oldsmobile	188	0	running	150	$14,800
7	20	6	Mark Martin	Roush Racing	Ford	188	0	running	146	$10,675
8	8	9	Bill Elliott	Melling Racing	Ford	188	1	running	147	$16,220
9	16	29	Cale Yarborough	Cale Yarborough Motorsports	Oldsmobile	188	5	running	143	$8,520
10	14	88	Buddy Baker	Baker–Schiff Racing	Oldsmobile	188	1	running	139	$11,370
11	12	55	Phil Parsons	Jackson Bros. Motorsports	Oldsmobile	188	3	running	135	$9,440
12	17	14	A. J. Foyt	A. J. Foyt Racing	Oldsmobile	188	3	running	132	$5,470
13	30	83	Lake Speed	Speed Racing	Oldsmobile	188	1	running	129	$6,650
14	21	11	Terry Labonte	Junior Johnson & Associates	Chevrolet	188	0	running	121	$12,680
15	13	21	Kyle Petty	Wood Brothers Racing	Ford	188	0	running	118	$12,175
16	18	33	Harry Gant	Mach 1 Racing	Chevrolet	188	0	running	115	$7,865
17	11	8	Bobby Hillin Jr.	Stavola Brothers Racing	Buick	188	0	running	112	$7,505
18	37	71	Dave Marcis	Marcis Auto Racing	Chevrolet	188	1	running	114	$7,395
19	32	7	Alan Kulwicki	Mach 1 Racing	Ford	188	0	running	106	$7,110
20	27	30	Michael Waltrip	Bahari Racing	Pontiac	187	0	running	103	$7,505
21	34	43	Richard Petty	Petty Enterprises	Pontiac	187	0	running	100	$6,635
22	40	98	Brad Noffsinger (R)	Curb Racing	Buick	187	0	running	97	$4,725
23	23	52	Jimmy Means	Jimmy Means Racing	Pontiac	187	1	running	99	$6,365
24	42	68	Derrike Cope	Testa Racing	Ford	187	0	running	91	$6,230
25	15	12	Mike Alexander	Stavola Brothers Racing	Buick	186	0	running	88	$10,520
26	38	73	Phil Barkdoll	Barkdoll Racing	Chevrolet	186	0	running	85	$3,355
27	41	90	Benny Parsons	Donlavey Racing	Ford	186	0	running	82	$5,935
28	33	15	Brett Bodine	Bud Moore Engineering	Ford	185	0	running	79	$11,825
29	28	97	Rodney Combs	Winkle Motorsports	Buick	184	0	running	76	$3,165
30	36	77	Ken Ragan	Ragan Racing	Ford	176	0	running	73	$3,105
31	24	23	Eddie Bierschwale	B&B Racing	Oldsmobile	175	0	running	70	$3,045
32	31	2	Ernie Irvan (R)	U.S. Racing	Chevrolet	165	0	running	67	$3,235
33	1	17	Darrell Waltrip	Hendrick Motorsports	Chevrolet	162	123	engine	74	$32,675
34	19	01	Mickey Gibbs	Gibbs Racing	Ford	160	2	clutch	66	$3,955
35	39	10	Ken Bouchard (R)	Whitcomb Racing	Ford	148	0	oil pan	58	$2,790
36	29	67	Ron Esau	Arrington Racing	Chevrolet	141	0	fan blade		$4,755
37	26	1	Dale Jarrett	Ellington Racing	Buick	141	1	engine	57	$2,795
38	10	50	Greg Sacks	Dingman Brothers Racing	Pontiac	133	0	engine	49	$2,630
39	3	28	Davey Allison	Ranier-Lundy Racing	Ford	88	1	engine	51	$12,270
40	5	75	Morgan Shepherd	RahMoc Enterprises	Pontiac	67	0	crash	43	$9,560
41	9	26	Ricky Rudd	King Racing	Buick	45	0	engine	40	$5,135
42	35	31	Joe Ruttman	Bob Clark Motorsports	Oldsmobile	33	0	engine	37	$3,110
Failed to qualify
43		07	Larry Moyer	Stark Racing	Pontiac					
44		95	Slick Johnson	Sadler Brothers Racing	Chevrolet					
45		86	Rick Jeffrey	Jeffrey Racing	Chevrolet					
46		0	Delma Cowart	H. L. Waters Racing	Chevrolet					
47		76	Hut Stricklin	Jaehne Motorsports	Pontiac					
48		59	Mark Gibson	Gibson Racing	Pontiac					
49		32	Philip Duffie	Duffie Racing	Buick					
50		70	J. D. McDuffie	McDuffie Racing	Pontiac					
Official race results

== Standings after the race ==
Drivers' Championship standings

	Pos	Driver	Points
	1	Rusty Wallace	2,518
	2	Bill Elliott	2,507 (-11)
	3	Dale Earnhardt	2,485 (-33)
1	4	Ken Schrader	2,331 (–187)
1	5	Terry Labonte	2,309 (–209)
	6	Geoff Bodine	2,264 (–254)
2	7	Sterling Marlin	2,145 (–373)
	8	Phil Parsons	2,137 (–381)
2	9	Darrell Waltrip	2,128 (–390)
	10	Bobby Hillin Jr.	2,059 (–459)
Official driver's standings

- Note: Only the first 10 positions are included for the driver standings.

Previous race: 1988 AC Spark Plug 500	NASCAR Winston Cup Series; 1988 season	Next race: 1988 The Budweiser at The Glen
