= 1988 Valleydale Meats 500 =

Sixth race of the 1988 NASCAR Winston Cup Series

Race details
- Race 6 of 29 in the 1988 NASCAR Winston Cup Series
- The 1988 Valleydale Meats 500 program cover, featuring Dale Earnhardt, Richard Petty, and Ricky Rudd.
- Date: April 10, 1988
- Official name: 28th Annual Valleydale Meats 500
- Location: Bristol, Tennessee, Bristol International Raceway
- Course: Permanent racing facility
- Course length: 0.858 km (0.533 miles)
- Distance: 500 laps, 266.5 mi (428.89 km)
- Scheduled distance: 500 laps, 266.5 mi (428.89 km)
- Average speed: 83.115 miles per hour (133.761 km/h)
- Attendance: 48,800

Pole position
Driver	Rick Wilson	Morgan–McClure Motorsports
- Time: 16.323

Most laps led
Driver	Harry Gant	Jackson Bros. Motorsports
- Laps: 121

Winner
No. 9	Bill Elliott	Melling Racing

Television in the United States
- Network: ESPN
- Announcers: Bob Jenkins, Ned Jarrett, Gary Nelson

Radio in the United States
- Radio: Motor Racing Network

The 1988 Valleydale Meats 500 was the sixth stock car race of the 1988 NASCAR Winston Cup Series season and the 28th iteration of the event. The race was held on Sunday, April 10, 1988, before an audience of 48,800, in Bristol, Tennessee, at Bristol International Raceway, a 0.533 miles (0.858 km) permanent oval-shaped racetrack.

With nine laps left in the race, race Melling Racing driver Bill Elliott would spin after contact with second-place driver, Hendrick Motorsports' Geoff Bodine. After racing back to the line, putting out the caution with eight laps left in the race, Elliott would manage to maintain second place. After the race proceeded to restart with four laps left in the race, Elliott would manage to mount a comeback, passing for the lead with three laps left in the race. Elliott would manage to defend Bodine for the victory, completing a spin-and-win late in the race. The victory was Elliott's 24th career NASCAR Winston Cup Series victory and his first victory of the season. To fill out the top three, Roush Racing driver Mark Martin and the aforementioned Geoff Bodine would finish second and third, respectively.

== Background ==
The layout of Bristol Motor Speedway, the venue where the race was held.

The Bristol Motor Speedway, formerly known as Bristol International Raceway and Bristol Raceway, is a NASCAR short track venue located in Bristol, Tennessee. Constructed in 1960, it held its first NASCAR race on July 30, 1961. Despite its short length, Bristol is among the most popular tracks on the NASCAR schedule because of its distinct features, which include extraordinarily steep banking, an all concrete surface, two pit roads, and stadium-like seating. It has also been named one of the loudest NASCAR tracks.

=== Entry list ===
- (R) denotes rookie driver.

#	Driver	Team	Make	Sponsor
2	Ernie Irvan (R)	U.S. Racing	Chevrolet	Kroger
3	Dale Earnhardt	Richard Childress Racing	Chevrolet	GM Goodwrench
4	Rick Wilson	Morgan–McClure Motorsports	Oldsmobile	Kodak
5	Geoff Bodine	Hendrick Motorsports	Chevrolet	Levi Garrett
6	Mark Martin	Roush Racing	Ford	Stroh's Light
7	Alan Kulwicki	AK Racing	Ford	Zerex
8	Bobby Hillin Jr.	Stavola Brothers Racing	Buick	Miller High Life
9	Bill Elliott	Melling Racing	Ford	Coors Light
10	Ken Bouchard (R)	Whitcomb Racing	Ford	Whitcomb Racing
11	Terry Labonte	Junior Johnson & Associates	Chevrolet	Budweiser
12	Bobby Allison	Stavola Brothers Racing	Buick	Miller High Life
15	Brett Bodine	Bud Moore Engineering	Ford	Crisco
17	Darrell Waltrip	Hendrick Motorsports	Chevrolet	Tide
21	Kyle Petty	Wood Brothers Racing	Ford	Citgo
25	Ken Schrader	Hendrick Motorsports	Chevrolet	Folgers
26	Ricky Rudd	King Racing	Buick	Quaker State
27	Rusty Wallace	Blue Max Racing	Pontiac	Kodiak
28	Davey Allison	Ranier-Lundy Racing	Ford	Texaco, Havoline
29	Dale Jarrett	Cale Yarborough Motorsports	Oldsmobile	Hardee's
30	Michael Waltrip	Bahari Racing	Pontiac	Country Time
31	Brad Teague	Bob Clark Motorsports	Oldsmobile	Slender You Figure Salons
33	Harry Gant	Mach 1 Racing	Chevrolet	Skoal Bandit
43	Richard Petty	Petty Enterprises	Pontiac	STP
44	Sterling Marlin	Hagan Racing	Oldsmobile	Piedmont Airlines
52	Jimmy Means	Jimmy Means Racing	Chevrolet	Eureka
55	Phil Parsons	Jackson Bros. Motorsports	Oldsmobile	Skoal, Crown Central Petroleum
68	Derrike Cope	Testa Racing	Ford	Purolator
71	Dave Marcis	Marcis Auto Racing	Chevrolet	Lifebuoy
75	Neil Bonnett	RahMoc Enterprises	Pontiac	Valvoline
83	Lake Speed	Speed Racing	Oldsmobile	Wynn's, Kmart
88	Buddy Baker	Baker–Schiff Racing	Oldsmobile	Red Baron Frozen Pizza
90	Benny Parsons	Donlavey Racing	Ford	Bull's-Eye Barbecue Sauce

== Qualifying ==
Qualifying was split into two rounds. The first round was held on Friday, April 8, at 4:45 pm EST. Each driver would have one lap to set a time. During the first round, the top 15 drivers in the round would be guaranteed a starting spot in the race. If a driver was not able to guarantee a spot in the first round, they had the option to scrub their time from the first round and try and run a faster lap time in a second round qualifying run, held on Saturday, April 9, at 12:00 pm EST. As with the first round, each driver would have one lap to set a time. For this specific race, positions 16-30 would be decided on time, and depending on who needed it, a select amount of positions were given to cars who had not otherwise qualified but were high enough in owner's points; up to two were given.

Rick Wilson, driving for Morgan–McClure Motorsports, would win the pole, setting a time of 16.323 and an average speed of 117.552 miles per hour (189.182 km/h) in the first round.

No drivers would fail to qualify.

=== Full qualifying results ===
Pos.	#	Driver	Team	Make	Time	Speed
1	4	Rick Wilson	Morgan–McClure Motorsports	Oldsmobile	16.323	117.552
2	7	Alan Kulwicki	AK Racing	Ford	16.368	117.229
3	5	Geoff Bodine	Hendrick Motorsports	Chevrolet	16.387	117.093
4	3	Dale Earnhardt	Richard Childress Racing	Chevrolet	16.398	117.014
5	6	Mark Martin	Roush Racing	Ford	16.413	116.907
6	25	Ken Schrader	Hendrick Motorsports	Chevrolet	16.423	116.836
7	55	Phil Parsons	Jackson Bros. Motorsports	Oldsmobile	16.489	116.368
8	17	Darrell Waltrip	Hendrick Motorsports	Chevrolet	16.508	116.235
9	11	Terry Labonte	Junior Johnson & Associates	Chevrolet	16.530	116.080
10	26	Ricky Rudd	King Racing	Buick	16.530	116.080
11	15	Brett Bodine	Bud Moore Engineering	Ford	16.599	115.597
12	33	Harry Gant	Mach 1 Racing	Chevrolet	16.605	115.556
13	9	Bill Elliott	Melling Racing	Ford	16.608	115.535
14	21	Kyle Petty	Wood Brothers Racing	Ford	16.625	115.417
15	44	Sterling Marlin	Hagan Racing	Oldsmobile	16.626	115.410
Failed to lock in Round 1
16	27	Rusty Wallace	Blue Max Racing	Pontiac	16.627	115.403
17	43	Richard Petty	Petty Enterprises	Pontiac	16.638	115.326
18	71	Dave Marcis	Marcis Auto Racing	Chevrolet	16.657	115.195
19	28	Davey Allison	Ranier-Lundy Racing	Ford	16.673	115.084
20	31	Brad Teague	Bob Clark Motorsports	Oldsmobile	16.701	114.891
21	12	Bobby Allison	Stavola Brothers Racing	Buick	16.720	114.761
22	30	Michael Waltrip	Bahari Racing	Pontiac	16.726	114.720
23	10	Ken Bouchard (R)	Whitcomb Racing	Ford	16.781	114.344
24	68	Derrike Cope	Testa Racing	Ford	16.784	114.323
25	29	Dale Jarrett	Cale Yarborough Motorsports	Oldsmobile	16.788	114.296
26	83	Lake Speed	Speed Racing	Oldsmobile	16.843	113.923
27	90	Benny Parsons	Donlavey Racing	Ford	16.856	113.835
28	2	Ernie Irvan (R)	U.S. Racing	Chevrolet	16.861	113.801
29	75	Neil Bonnett	RahMoc Enterprises	Pontiac	16.890	113.606
30	52	Jimmy Means	Jimmy Means Racing	Pontiac	17.031	112.665
Provisionals
31	88	Buddy Baker	Baker–Schiff Racing	Oldsmobile	17.180	111.688
32	8	Bobby Hillin Jr.	Stavola Brothers Racing	Buick	-	-
Official first round qualifying results
Official starting lineup

== Race results ==
Fin	St	#	Driver	Team	Make	Laps	Led	Status	Pts	Winnings
1	13	9	Bill Elliott	Melling Racing	Ford	500	116	running	180	$45,750
2	5	6	Mark Martin	Roush Racing	Ford	500	0	running	170	$21,250
3	3	5	Geoff Bodine	Hendrick Motorsports	Chevrolet	500	74	running	170	$17,425
4	16	27	Rusty Wallace	Blue Max Racing	Pontiac	499	0	running	160	$14,370
5	21	12	Bobby Allison	Stavola Brothers Racing	Buick	498	0	running	155	$12,625
6	17	43	Richard Petty	Petty Enterprises	Pontiac	497	0	running	150	$9,800
7	14	21	Kyle Petty	Wood Brothers Racing	Ford	495	0	running	146	$9,300
8	15	44	Sterling Marlin	Hagan Racing	Oldsmobile	495	0	running	142	$6,700
9	18	71	Dave Marcis	Marcis Auto Racing	Chevrolet	493	48	running	143	$6,250
10	6	25	Ken Schrader	Hendrick Motorsports	Chevrolet	493	0	running	134	$9,600
11	29	75	Neil Bonnett	RahMoc Enterprises	Pontiac	490	0	running	130	$8,250
12	22	30	Michael Waltrip	Bahari Racing	Pontiac	486	0	running	127	$5,550
13	27	90	Benny Parsons	Donlavey Racing	Ford	483	0	running	124	$5,200
14	4	3	Dale Earnhardt	Richard Childress Racing	Chevrolet	461	95	running	126	$12,050
15	32	8	Bobby Hillin Jr.	Stavola Brothers Racing	Buick	448	24	running	123	$5,200
16	9	11	Terry Labonte	Junior Johnson & Associates	Chevrolet	437	0	running	115	$7,560
17	11	15	Brett Bodine	Bud Moore Engineering	Ford	430	0	running	112	$9,120
18	12	33	Harry Gant	Mach 1 Racing	Chevrolet	421	121	quit	119	$6,830
19	2	7	Alan Kulwicki	AK Racing	Ford	383	0	running	106	$4,940
20	10	26	Ricky Rudd	King Racing	Buick	378	1	crash	108	$4,800
21	23	10	Ken Bouchard (R)	Whitcomb Racing	Ford	361	0	running	100	$2,360
22	7	55	Phil Parsons	Jackson Bros. Motorsports	Oldsmobile	360	0	crash	97	$3,920
23	8	17	Darrell Waltrip	Hendrick Motorsports	Chevrolet	327	0	running	94	$7,230
24	24	68	Derrike Cope	Testa Racing	Ford	298	0	overheating	91	$3,790
25	1	4	Rick Wilson	Morgan–McClure Motorsports	Oldsmobile	291	21	running	93	$4,775
26	28	2	Ernie Irvan (R)	U.S. Racing	Chevrolet	284	0	crash	85	$2,345
27	20	31	Brad Teague	Bob Clark Motorsports	Oldsmobile	265	0	crash	82	$1,390
28	25	29	Dale Jarrett	Cale Yarborough Motorsports	Oldsmobile	129	0	oil pump	79	$1,360
29	19	28	Davey Allison	Ranier-Lundy Racing	Ford	91	0	engine	76	$9,430
30	26	83	Lake Speed	Speed Racing	Oldsmobile	81	0	engine	73	$1,300
31	31	88	Buddy Baker	Baker–Schiff Racing	Oldsmobile	77	0	engine	70	$3,450
32	30	52	Jimmy Means	Jimmy Means Racing	Pontiac	26	0	crash	67	$3,400
Official race results

== Standings after the race ==
Drivers' Championship standings

	Pos	Driver	Points
	1	Dale Earnhardt	884
1	2	Sterling Marlin	877 (-8)
1	3	Neil Bonnett	868 (-16)
2	4	Bill Elliott	860 (–24)
1	5	Rusty Wallace	846 (–38)
1	6	Bobby Allison	840 (–44)
2	7	Terry Labonte	752 (–132)
	8	Darrell Waltrip	751 (–133)
1	9	Bobby Hillin Jr.	751 (–133)
2	10	Ken Schrader	749 (–135)
Official driver's standings

- Note: Only the first 10 positions are included for the driver standings.

Previous race: 1988 TranSouth 500	NASCAR Winston Cup Series; 1988 season	Next race: 1988 First Union 400
