= 1988 Winston 500 =

Ninth race of the 1988 NASCAR Winston Cup Series

Race details
- Race 9 of 29 in the 1988 NASCAR Winston Cup Series
- The 1988 Winston 500 program cover, featuring Davey Allison.
- Date: May 1, 1988
- Official name: 19th Annual Winston 500
- Location: Lincoln, Alabama, Talladega Superspeedway
- Course: Permanent racing facility
- Course length: 2.66 miles (4.28 km)
- Distance: 188 laps, 500.08 mi (804.8 km)
- Scheduled distance: 188 laps, 500.08 mi (804.8 km)
- Average speed: 156.547 miles per hour (251.938 km/h)
- Attendance: 135,000

Pole position
Driver	Davey Allison	Ranier-Lundy Racing
- Time: 48.128

Most laps led
Driver	Geoff Bodine	Hendrick Motorsports
- Laps: 99

Winner
No. 55	Phil Parsons	Jackson Brothers Motorsports

Television in the United States
- Network: ESPN
- Announcers: Bob Jenkins, Ned Jarrett, Gary Nelson

Radio in the United States
- Radio: Motor Racing Network

The 1988 Winston 500 was the ninth stock car race of the 1988 NASCAR Winston Cup Series season and the 19th iteration of the event. The race was held on Sunday, May 1, 1988, before an audience of 135,000 in Lincoln, Alabama at Talladega Superspeedway, a 2.66 miles (4.28 km) permanent triangle-shaped superspeedway. The race took the scheduled 188 laps to complete. In the closing laps of the race, Jackson Brothers Motorsports driver Phil Parsons would fiercely defend the field en route to his first and only career NASCAR Winston Cup Series victory and his only victory of the season. To fill out the podium, Stavola Brothers Racing driver Bobby Allison and Hendrick Motorsports driver Geoff Bodine would finish second and third, respectively.

== Background ==
The layout of Talladega Superspeedway, the venue where the race was held.

Talladega Superspeedway, originally known as Alabama International Motor Superspeedway (AIMS), is a motorsports complex located north of Talladega, Alabama. It is located on the former Anniston Air Force Base in the small city of Lincoln. The track is a tri-oval and was constructed in the 1960s by the International Speedway Corporation, a business controlled by the France family. Talladega is most known for its steep banking and the unique location of the start/finish line that's located just past the exit to pit road. The track currently hosts the NASCAR series such as the NASCAR Cup Series, Xfinity Series and the Camping World Truck Series. Talladega is the longest NASCAR oval with a length of 2.66-mile-long (4.28 km) tri-oval like the Daytona International Speedway, which also is a 2.5-mile-long (4 km) tri-oval.

=== Entry list ===
- (R) denotes rookie driver.

#	Driver	Team	Make
1	Dale Jarrett	Ellington Racing	Buick
01	Mickey Gibbs	Gibbs Racing	Ford
2	Ernie Irvan (R)	U.S. Racing	Chevrolet
3	Dale Earnhardt	Richard Childress Racing	Chevrolet
4	Rick Wilson	Morgan–McClure Motorsports	Oldsmobile
5	Geoff Bodine	Hendrick Motorsports	Chevrolet
6	Mark Martin	Roush Racing	Ford
7	Alan Kulwicki	AK Racing	Ford
8	Bobby Hillin Jr.	Stavola Brothers Racing	Buick
9	Bill Elliott	Melling Racing	Ford
10	Ken Bouchard (R)	Whitcomb Racing	Ford
11	Terry Labonte	Junior Johnson & Associates	Chevrolet
12	Bobby Allison	Stavola Brothers Racing	Buick
14	A. J. Foyt	A. J. Foyt Enterprises	Oldsmobile
15	Brett Bodine	Bud Moore Engineering	Ford
17	Darrell Waltrip	Hendrick Motorsports	Chevrolet
21	Kyle Petty	Wood Brothers Racing	Ford
23	Eddie Bierschwale	B&B Racing	Oldsmobile
25	Ken Schrader	Hendrick Motorsports	Chevrolet
26	Ricky Rudd	King Racing	Buick
27	Rusty Wallace	Blue Max Racing	Pontiac
28	Davey Allison	Ranier-Lundy Racing	Ford
29	Cale Yarborough	Cale Yarborough Motorsports	Oldsmobile
30	Michael Waltrip	Bahari Racing	Pontiac
31	Brad Teague	Bob Clark Motorsports	Oldsmobile
33	Harry Gant	Mach 1 Racing	Chevrolet
43	Richard Petty	Petty Enterprises	Pontiac
44	Sterling Marlin	Hagan Racing	Oldsmobile
50	Greg Sacks	Dingman Brothers Racing	Pontiac
52	Jimmy Means	Jimmy Means Racing	Pontiac
55	Phil Parsons	Jackson Bros. Motorsports	Oldsmobile
67	Rick Jeffrey	Arrington Racing	Chevrolet
68	Derrike Cope	Testa Racing	Ford
71	Dave Marcis	Marcis Auto Racing	Chevrolet
73	Phil Barkdoll	Barkdoll Racing	Chevrolet
75	Neil Bonnett	RahMoc Enterprises	Pontiac
77	Ken Ragan	Branch-Ragan Racing	Ford
80	Jimmy Horton (R)	S&H Racing	Ford
83	Lake Speed	Speed Racing	Oldsmobile
88	Buddy Baker	Baker-Schiff Racing	Oldsmobile
90	Benny Parsons	Donlavey Racing	Ford
95	Trevor Boys	Sadler Brothers Racing	Chevrolet
97	Rodney Combs	Winkle Motorsports	Buick
98	Brad Noffsinger (R)	Curb Racing	Buick
99	Connie Saylor	Ball Motorsports	Chevrolet

== Qualifying ==
Qualifying was split into two rounds. The first round was held on Thursday, April 28, at 3:00 PM CST. Each driver would have one lap to set a time. During the first round, the top 20 drivers in the round would be guaranteed a starting spot in the race. If a driver was not able to guarantee a spot in the first round, they had the option to scrub their time from the first round and try and run a faster lap time in a second round qualifying run, held on Friday, April 29, at 5:00 PM EST. As with the first round, each driver would have one lap to set a time. One more position, the last starting spot on the field, was given to the driver who was not locked into the top 40 on owner's points.

Davey Allison, driving for Ranier-Lundy Racing, would win the pole, setting a time of 48.128 and an average speed of 198.969 miles per hour (320.210 km/h).

Four drivers would fail to qualify: Jimmy Horton, Trevor Boys, Connie Saylor, and Ken Bouchard.

=== Full qualifying results ===
Pos.	#	Driver	Team	Make	Time	Speed
1	28	Davey Allison	Ranier-Lundy Racing	Ford	48.128	198.969
2	17	Darrell Waltrip	Hendrick Motorsports	Chevrolet	48.289	198.306
3	55	Phil Parsons	Jackson Brothers Motorsports	Oldsmobile	48.364	197.999
4	12	Bobby Allison	Stavola Brothers Racing	Buick	48.604	197.021
5	21	Kyle Petty	Wood Brothers Racing	Ford	48.613	196.984
6	25	Ken Schrader	Hendrick Motorsports	Chevrolet	48.793	196.258
7	8	Bobby Hillin Jr.	Stavola Brothers Racing	Buick	48.813	196.177
8	44	Sterling Marlin	Hagan Racing	Oldsmobile	48.859	195.993
9	75	Neil Bonnett	RahMoc Enterprises	Pontiac	48.887	195.880
10	88	Buddy Baker	Baker-Schiff Racing	Oldsmobile	49.213	194.583
11	9	Bill Elliott	Melling Racing	Ford	49.220	194.555
12	6	Mark Martin	Roush Racing	Ford	49.231	194.512
13	5	Geoff Bodine	Hendrick Motorsports	Chevrolet	49.288	194.287
14	26	Ricky Rudd	King Racing	Buick	49.513	193.404
15	27	Rusty Wallace	Blue Max Racing	Pontiac	49.523	193.365
16	3	Dale Earnhardt	Richard Childress Racing	Chevrolet	49.524	193.361
17	50	Greg Sacks	Dingman Brothers Racing	Pontiac	49.531	193.333
18	83	Lake Speed	Speed Racing	Oldsmobile	49.582	193.135
19	11	Terry Labonte	Junior Johnson & Associates	Chevrolet	49.628	192.956
20	4	Rick Wilson	Morgan–McClure Motorsports	Oldsmobile	49.723	192.587
Failed to lock in Round 1
21	14	A. J. Foyt	A. J. Foyt Enterprises	Oldsmobile	49.597	193.076
22	52	Jimmy Means	Jimmy Means Racing	Pontiac	49.661	192.827
23	30	Michael Waltrip	Bahari Racing	Pontiac	49.830	192.173
24	31	Brad Teague	Bob Clark Motorsports	Oldsmobile	49.857	192.069
25	33	Harry Gant	Mach 1 Racing	Chevrolet	49.981	191.593
26	7	Alan Kulwicki	AK Racing	Ford	50.085	191.195
27	90	Benny Parsons	Donlavey Racing	Ford	50.269	190.495
28	1	Dale Jarrett	Ellington Racing	Buick	50.351	190.185
29	97	Rodney Combs	Winkle Motorsports	Buick	50.395	190.019
30	23	Eddie Bierschwale	B&B Racing	Oldsmobile	50.399	190.004
31	68	Derrike Cope	Testa Racing	Ford	50.462	189.767
32	43	Richard Petty	Petty Enterprises	Pontiac	50.517	189.560
33	67	Rick Jeffrey	Arrington Racing	Chevrolet	50.523	189.537
34	98	Brad Noffsinger (R)	Curb Racing	Buick	50.574	189.346
35	77	Ken Ragan	Branch-Ragan Racing	Ford	50.577	189.335
36	71	Dave Marcis	Marcis Auto Racing	Chevrolet	50.614	189.197
37	29	Cale Yarborough	Cale Yarborough Motorsports	Oldsmobile	50.703	188.865
38	01	Mickey Gibbs	Gibbs Racing	Ford	50.823	188.419
39	15	Brett Bodine	Bud Moore Engineering	Ford	50.872	188.237
40	73	Phil Barkdoll	Barkdoll Racing	Chevrolet	51.030	187.654
Provisional
41	2	Ernie Irvan (R)	U.S. Racing	Chevrolet	51.546	185.776
Failed to qualify
42	80	Jimmy Horton (R)	S&H Racing	Ford	51.425	186.213
43	95	Trevor Boys	Sadler Brothers Racing	Chevrolet	51.438	186.166
44	99	Connie Saylor	Ball Motorsports	Chevrolet	51.799	184.868
45	10	Ken Bouchard (R)	Whitcomb Racing	Ford	51.899	184.512
Official qualifying results

== Race results ==
Fin	St	#	Driver	Team	Make	Laps	Led	Status	Pts	Winnings
1	3	55	Phil Parsons	Jackson Brothers Motorsports	Oldsmobile	188	52	running	180	$86,850
2	4	12	Bobby Allison	Stavola Brothers Racing	Buick	188	13	running	175	$50,060
3	13	5	Geoff Bodine	Hendrick Motorsports	Chevrolet	188	99	running	175	$37,560
4	19	11	Terry Labonte	Junior Johnson & Associates	Chevrolet	188	1	running	165	$28,425
5	6	25	Ken Schrader	Hendrick Motorsports	Chevrolet	188	11	running	160	$27,165
6	8	44	Sterling Marlin	Hagan Racing	Oldsmobile	188	1	running	155	$17,775
7	11	9	Bill Elliott	Melling Racing	Ford	188	0	running	146	$21,375
8	5	21	Kyle Petty	Wood Brothers Racing	Ford	188	0	running	142	$18,000
9	16	3	Dale Earnhardt	Richard Childress Racing	Chevrolet	188	0	running	138	$21,500
10	15	27	Rusty Wallace	Blue Max Racing	Pontiac	188	3	running	139	$19,300
11	28	1	Dale Jarrett	Ellington Racing	Buick	188	0	running	130	$9,790
12	12	6	Mark Martin	Roush Racing	Ford	188	0	running	127	$7,240
13	7	8	Bobby Hillin Jr.	Stavola Brothers Racing	Buick	188	0	running	124	$10,840
14	9	75	Neil Bonnett	RahMoc Enterprises	Pontiac	188	0	running	121	$13,440
15	18	83	Lake Speed	Speed Racing	Oldsmobile	188	0	running	118	$6,640
16	10	88	Buddy Baker	Baker-Schiff Racing	Oldsmobile	187	0	running	115	$9,740
17	17	50	Greg Sacks	Dingman Brothers Racing	Pontiac	187	0	running	112	$5,120
18	37	29	Cale Yarborough	Cale Yarborough Motorsports	Oldsmobile	186	0	running	109	$4,920
19	39	15	Brett Bodine	Bud Moore Engineering	Ford	185	0	running	106	$13,320
20	32	43	Richard Petty	Petty Enterprises	Pontiac	185	0	running	103	$8,970
21	24	31	Brad Teague	Bob Clark Motorsports	Oldsmobile	185	0	running	100	$4,260
22	26	7	Alan Kulwicki	AK Racing	Ford	185	0	running	97	$7,760
23	22	52	Jimmy Means	Jimmy Means Racing	Pontiac	184	0	running	94	$7,320
24	27	90	Benny Parsons	Donlavey Racing	Ford	184	0	running	91	$6,920
25	34	98	Brad Noffsinger (R)	Curb Racing	Buick	183	0	running	88	$4,670
26	31	68	Derrike Cope	Testa Racing	Ford	183	0	running	85	$6,695
27	36	71	Dave Marcis	Marcis Auto Racing	Chevrolet	183	0	running	82	$6,545
28	21	14	A. J. Foyt	A. J. Foyt Enterprises	Oldsmobile	182	0	flagged	79	$4,145
29	14	26	Ricky Rudd	King Racing	Buick	177	0	engine	76	$6,345
30	33	67	Rick Jeffrey	Arrington Racing	Chevrolet	176	0	engine	73	$6,245
31	40	73	Phil Barkdoll	Barkdoll Racing	Chevrolet	176	0	running	70	$3,450
32	41	2	Ernie Irvan (R)	U.S. Racing	Chevrolet	169	0	overheating	67	$4,350
33	23	30	Michael Waltrip	Bahari Racing	Pontiac	148	0	crash	64	$6,050
34	1	28	Davey Allison	Ranier-Lundy Racing	Ford	132	4	engine	66	$18,475
35	20	4	Rick Wilson	Morgan–McClure Motorsports	Oldsmobile	122	0	oil leak	58	$3,975
36	25	33	Harry Gant	Mach 1 Racing	Chevrolet	100	0	transmission	55	$5,925
37	2	17	Darrell Waltrip	Hendrick Motorsports	Chevrolet	83	4	engine	57	$11,850
38	29	97	Rodney Combs	Winkle Motorsports	Buick	13	0	crash	49	$3,275
39	30	23	Eddie Bierschwale	B&B Racing	Oldsmobile	13	0	crash	46	$3,225
40	38	01	Mickey Gibbs	Gibbs Racing	Ford	13	0	crash	43	$3,200
41	35	77	Ken Ragan	Branch-Ragan Racing	Ford	13	0	crash	40	$3,200
Failed to qualify
42		80	Jimmy Horton (R)	S&H Racing	Ford					
43		95	Trevor Boys	Sadler Brothers Racing	Chevrolet					
44		99	Connie Saylor	Ball Motorsports	Chevrolet					
45		10	Ken Bouchard (R)	Whitcomb Racing	Ford					
Official race results

== Standings after the race ==
Drivers' Championship standings

	Pos	Driver	Points
	1	Dale Earnhardt	1,382
	2	Sterling Marlin	1,322 (-60)
	3	Bill Elliott	1,275 (-107)
1	4	Terry Labonte	1,262 (–120)
1	5	Bobby Allison	1,260 (–122)
2	6	Rusty Wallace	1,260 (–122)
4	7	Geoff Bodine	1,175 (–207)
1	8	Neil Bonnett	1,173 (–209)
1	9	Ken Schrader	1,173 (–209)
2	10	Bobby Hillin Jr.	1,154 (–228)
Official driver's standings

- Note: Only the first 10 positions are included for the driver standings.

Previous race: 1988 Pannill Sweatshirts 500	NASCAR Winston Cup Series; 1988 season	Next race: 1988 Coca-Cola 600
