= Steve Moore (racing driver) =

American racing driver (1958–2024)

- Born: Steven Willard Moore; November 6, 1958; Carrollton, Georgia, U.S.
- Died: September 23, 2024 (aged 65)

NASCAR Cup Series career
- 18 races run over 8 years
- Best finish: 47th (1980)
- First race: 1977 Talladega 500 (Talladega)
- Last race: 1988 TranSouth 500 (Darlington)
Wins	Top tens	Poles
	0

Steven Willard Moore (November 6, 1958 – September 23, 2024) was an American NASCAR driver from Carrollton, Georgia. In his eighteen-race Winston Cup career from 1977 to 1988, he primarily drove a No. 73 Pontiac or Chevrolet owned by his family.

== Winston Cup Series ==
Moore made his first NASCAR Winston Cup Series start at the age of eighteen at Talladega Superspeedway in 1977, driving the No. 07 Chevrolet for Norris Price. He finished a respectable nineteenth place in that race. He raced once each year after that until 1980, when he raced in four Winston Cup races for his family-owned team. He had a best finish in 1980 of thirteenth at Atlanta Motor Speedway. 1981 saw Moore attempting to make the Daytona 500. A seventeenth-place finish in the First UNO Twin 125 race would not be enough to get into the prestigious event. Moore struggled in 1982, only finishing one of the four races that he entered. Moore made two starts in 1983 at Talladega and Michigan. In 1984, Moore once again tried to make the Daytona 500 but was involved in a savage crash in his qualifying race on the 22nd lap. He raced sporadically until 1988, the year he raced his final Winston Cup races. He drove for Roger Hamby in three races, including the Daytona 500, a race Moore had been trying to make for five years.

== ARCA ==
Moore raced in one ARCA Permatex SuperCar Series race in his career, coming in 1986 at Talladega. Driving his No. 76 Domino's Pizza Chevrolet, Moore was involved in a first lap accident and failed to finish.

== Personal life ==
Moore died on September 23, 2024, and was survived by his wife Sheila. She later announced that he died by suicide brought on by a bout with major depression and insomnia since a heavy anxiety attack at the beginning of the year.
