= 1988 NASCAR Winston Cup Series =

American motorsport season

Seasons
- ← 1987 1989 →

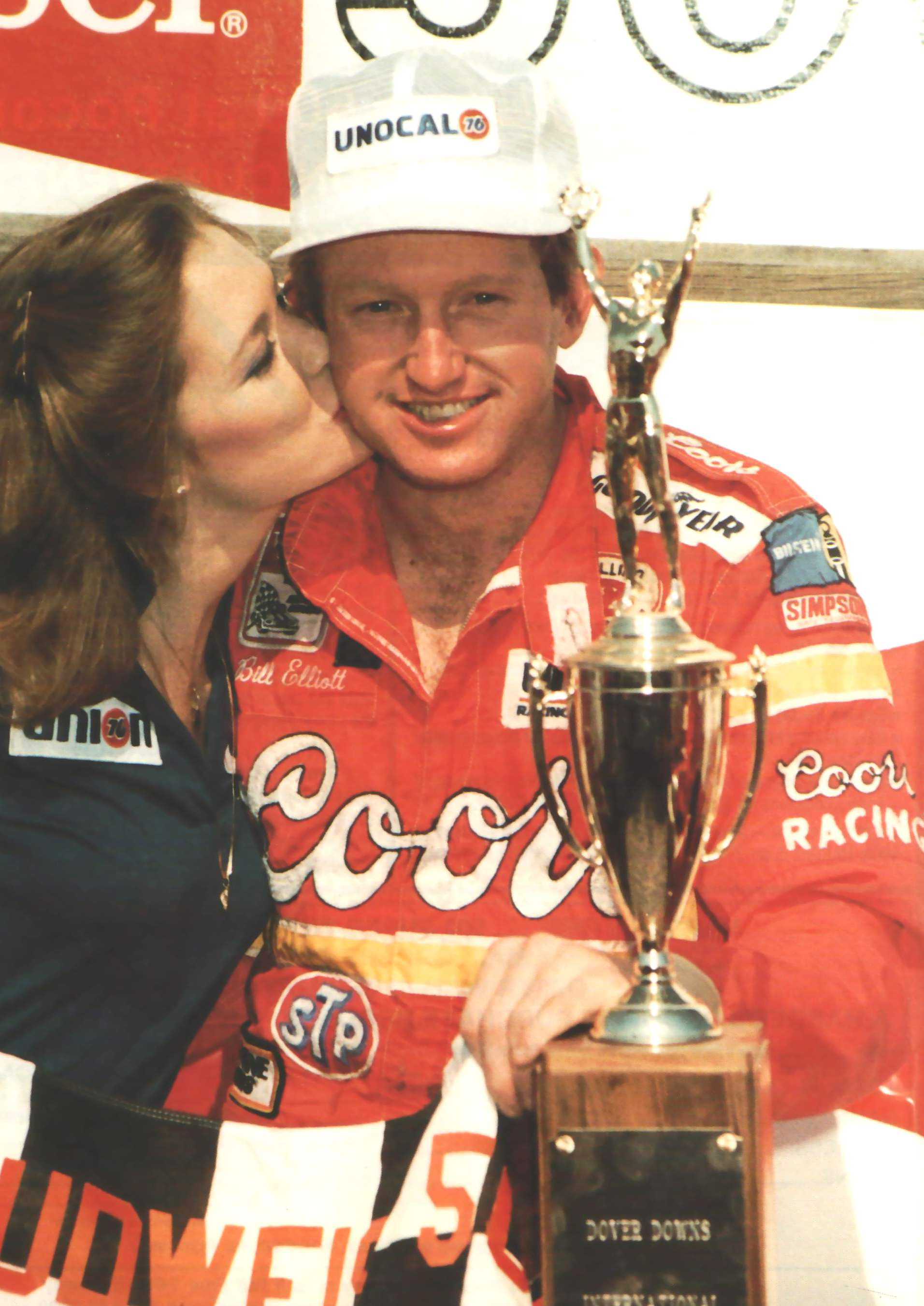
Bill Elliott, won the championship.

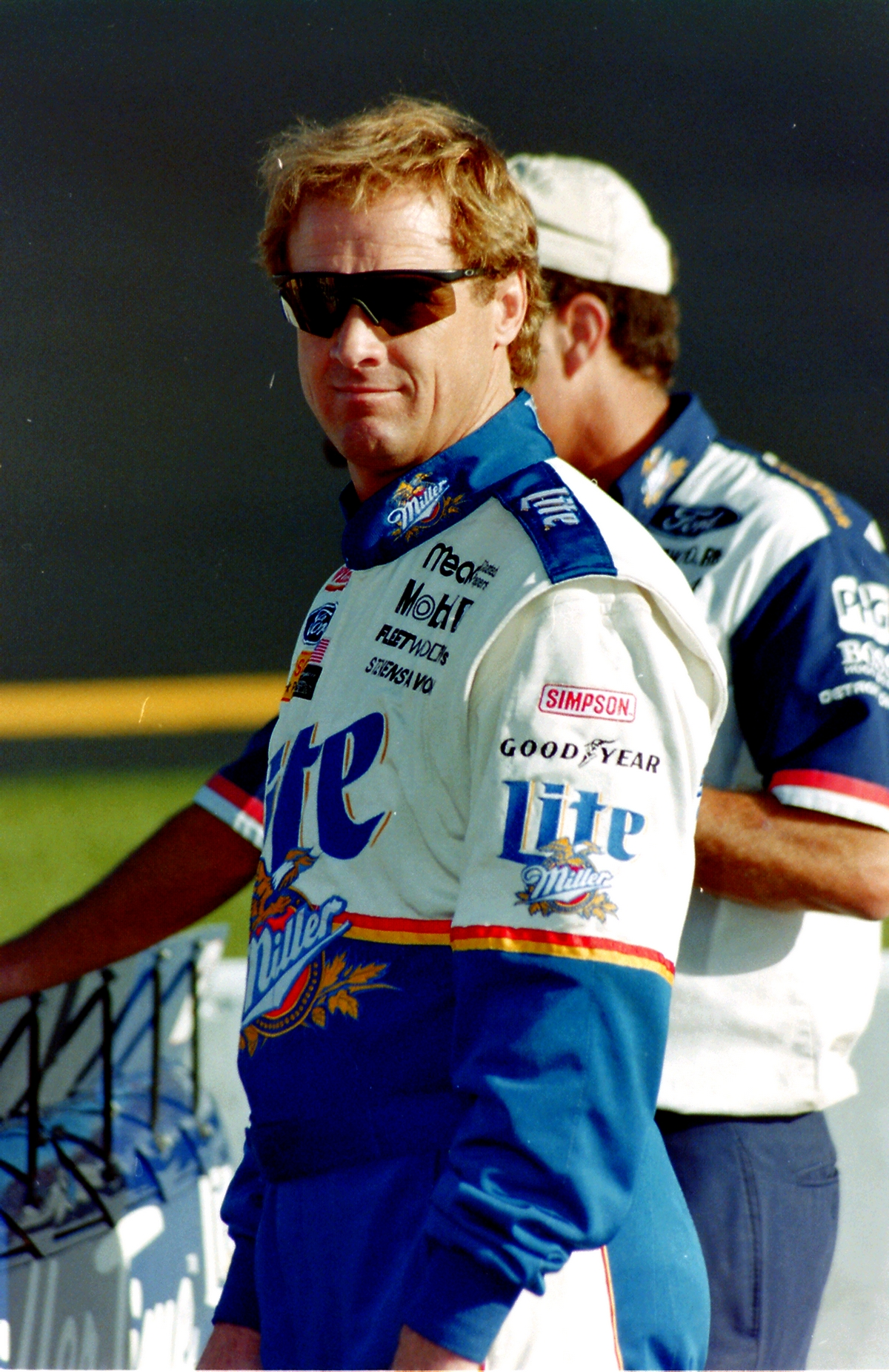
Rusty Wallace finished runner up in 1988.

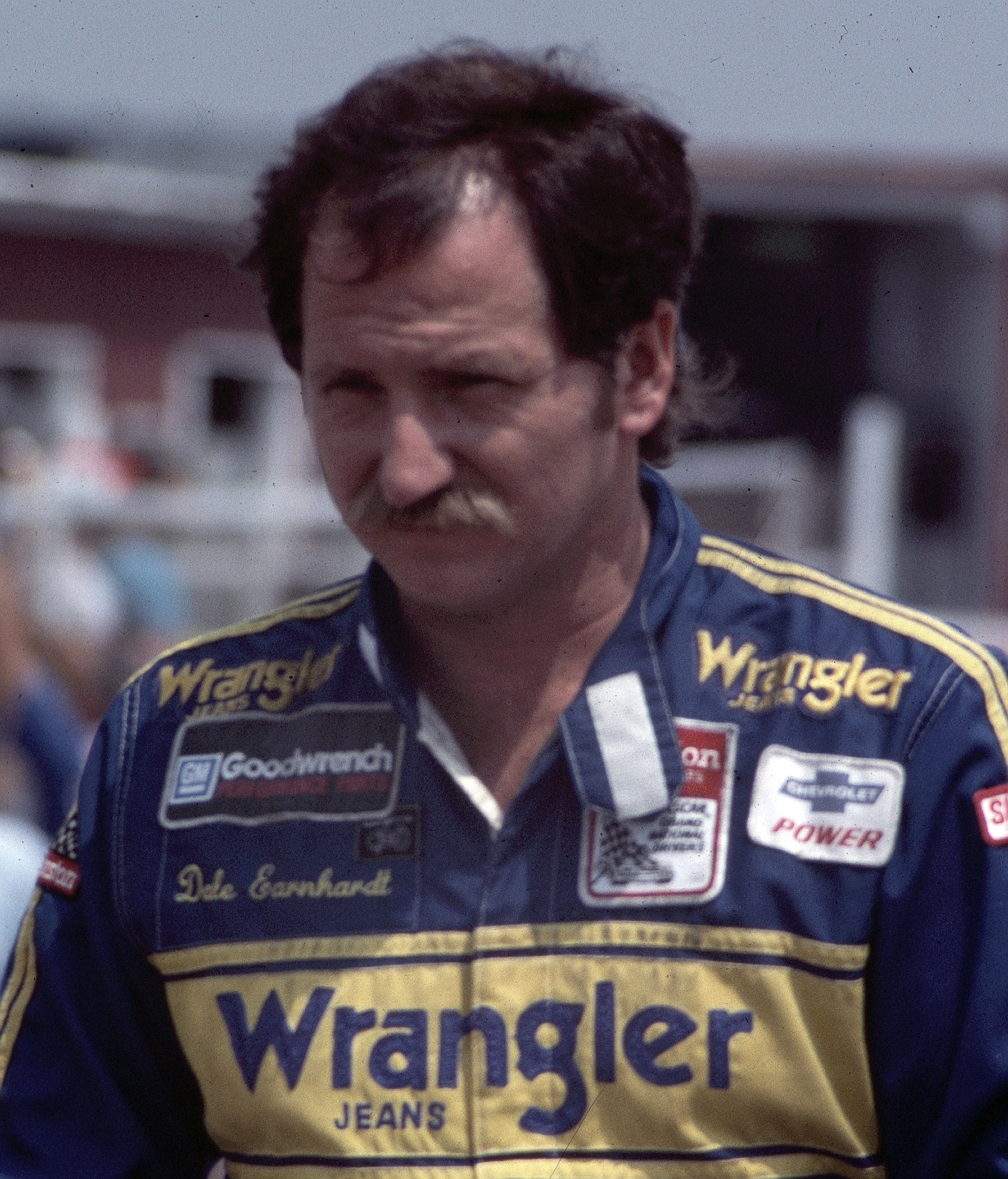
Dale Earnhardt finished third in the championship.

The 1988 NASCAR Winston Cup Series was the 40th season of professional stock car racing in the United States and the 17th modern-era Cup series. The season began on February 7 at Daytona International Speedway and ended on November 20 at the Atlanta International Speedway. Bill Elliott of Melling Racing won the championship.

The 1988 season was notable for hosting the first of two NASCAR tire wars between Goodyear and Hoosier. Notably, unless a team was under an exclusive tire contract, teams were allowed to switch tire manufacturers from race to race so no team ran a full season on the same tire like in other motorsports where teams tend exclusively run one tire manufacturer during a tire war.

== Teams and drivers ==
=== Complete schedule ===
Manufacturer	Team	No.	Driver	Crew Chief
Buick	King Racing	26	Ricky Rudd	Larry McReynolds
Buick	Stavola Brothers Racing	8	Bobby Hillin Jr.	Bill Woodruff
Buick	Stavola Brothers Racing	12	Bobby Allison 13	Jimmy Fennig
Buick	Stavola Brothers Racing	12	Mike Alexander 16	Jimmy Fennig
Chevrolet	Hendrick Motorsports	5	Geoff Bodine	Waddell Wilson
Chevrolet	Hendrick Motorsports	17	Darrell Waltrip	Jeff Hammond
Chevrolet	Hendrick Motorsports	25	Ken Schrader	Harry Hyde
Chevrolet	Junior Johnson & Associates	11	Terry Labonte	Tim Brewer
Chevrolet	Mach 1 Racing	33	Harry Gant 24	Travis Carter
Chevrolet	Mach 1 Racing	33	Morgan Shepherd 5	Travis Carter
Chevrolet	Marcis Auto Racing	71	Dave Marcis	Ivan Baldwin
Chevrolet	Richard Childress Racing	3	Dale Earnhardt	Kirk Shelmerdine
Ford	AK Racing	7	Alan Kulwicki	Paul Andrews
Ford	Bud Moore Engineering	15	Brett Bodine	Bud Moore
Ford	Donlavey Racing	90	Benny Parsons 27	Doug Richert
Ford	Donlavey Racing	90	Tommy Ellis 1	Doug Richert
Ford	Donlavey Racing	90	Jimmy Means 1	Doug Richert
Ford	Melling Racing	9	Bill Elliott	Ernie Elliott
Ford	Ranier-Lundy Racing	28	Davey Allison	Tony Price
Ford	Roush Racing	6	Mark Martin	Robin Pemberton
Ford	Whitcomb Racing	10	Ken Bouchard (R)	Bob Johnson 14; Jim Garde 15
Ford	Wood Brothers Racing	21	Kyle Petty	Leonard Wood
Oldsmobile	Cale Yarborough Motorsports	29	Cale Yarborough 10	Elmo Langley 28; Cale Yarborough 1
Oldsmobile	Cale Yarborough Motorsports	29	Dale Jarrett 19	Elmo Langley 28; Cale Yarborough 1
Oldsmobile	Bob Clark Motorsports	31	Brad Teague 9	Bob Sutton 14; Bob Clark 15
Oldsmobile	Bob Clark Motorsports	31	Joe Ruttman 9	Bob Sutton 14; Bob Clark 15
Oldsmobile	Bob Clark Motorsports	31	Donnie Allison 1	Bob Sutton 14; Bob Clark 15
Oldsmobile	Bob Clark Motorsports	31	Butch Miller 2	Bob Sutton 14; Bob Clark 15
Oldsmobile	Bob Clark Motorsports	31	Jim Sauter 4	Bob Sutton 14; Bob Clark 15
Oldsmobile	Bob Clark Motorsports	31	Lee Faulk 3	Bob Sutton 14; Bob Clark 15
Oldsmobile	Bob Clark Motorsports	31	Johnny Rutherford 1	Bob Sutton 14; Bob Clark 15
Oldsmobile	Hagan Racing	44	Sterling Marlin	Jake Elder
Oldsmobile	Jackson Brothers Motorsports	55	Phil Parsons	Andy Petree
Oldsmobile	Morgan-McClure Motorsports	4	Rick Wilson	Tony Glover
Oldsmobile	Speed Racing	83	Lake Speed	Darrell Bryant
Pontiac	Bahari Racing	30	Michael Waltrip	Mike Beam
Pontiac	Baker-Schiff Racing	88	Buddy Baker 17	Herb Nab 7 Joey Knuckles 22
Pontiac	Baker-Schiff Racing	88	Morgan Shepherd 3	Herb Nab 7 Joey Knuckles 22
Pontiac	Baker-Schiff Racing	88	Rick Mast 2	Herb Nab 7 Joey Knuckles 22
Pontiac	Baker-Schiff Racing	88	Greg Sacks 7	Herb Nab 7 Joey Knuckles 22
Pontiac	Blue Max Racing	27	Rusty Wallace	Barry Dodson
Pontiac	Means Racing	52	Jimmy Means	Keith Wilson
Pontiac	Petty Enterprises	43	Richard Petty	Dale Inman
Pontiac	RahMoc Enterprises	75	Neil Bonnett 27	Butch Mock
Pontiac	RahMoc Enterprises	75	Morgan Shepherd 2	Butch Mock
Pontiac	U.S. Racing	2	Ernie Irvan (R)	Marc Reno 15; D.K. Ulrich 3 Bob Johnson 11

=== Limited schedule ===
Manufacturer	Team	No.	Driver	Crew Chief	Round(s)
Buick	AAG Racing	34	Donnie Allison		1
Buick	AAG Racing	34	Connie Saylor		2
Buick	AAG Racing	34	Rodney Combs		1
Buick	Curb Racing	98	Ed Pimm	Carlisle Johnson; Cliff Champion; Darrell Bryant	3
Buick	Curb Racing	98	Brad Noffsinger (R)	Carlisle Johnson; Cliff Champion; Darrell Bryant	25
Buick	Ellington Racing	1	Dale Jarrett	Shelton Pittmann	9
Buick	Ellington Racing	1	Jim Bown	Shelton Pittmann	2
Buick	Hope Motorsports	37	Patty Moise	David Ifft	2
Buick	Philip Duffie	32	Philip Duffie		4
Buick	James Hylton	48	Tony Spanos		5
Buick	Shepherd Racing	47	Morgan Shepherd		3
Buick	Shepherd Racing	57	Bobby Wawak		1
Buick	Shepherd Racing	57	Morgan Shepherd		8
Buick	Reet Racing	66	Bob Schacht		1
Buick	Winkle Motorsports	97	Morgan Shepherd		3
Buick	Winkle Motorsports	97	Rodney Combs		21
Buick	Winkle Motorsports	97	Tommy Ellis		2
Buick	Winkle Motorsports	97	Joe Ruttman		1
Chevrolet	Hamby Motorsports	22	Steve Moore		4
Chevrolet	Hamby Motorsports	22	Lennie Pond		1
Chevrolet	Hendrick Motorsports	18	Sarel van der Merwe	Gary Nelson	1
Chevrolet	Hendrick Motorsports	18	Rick Hendrick	Gary Nelson	1
Chevrolet	Hendrick Motorsports	47	Rob Moroso	Gary Nelson	1
Chevrolet	Henley Gray	54	Ronnie Sanders		2
Chevrolet	Henley Gray	54	Lennie Pond		1
Chevrolet	Linro Motorsports	63	Jocko Maggiacomo		7
Chevrolet	John McFadden	24	John McFadden		1
Chevrolet	Pearson Racing	16	Larry Pearson	Ricky Pearson	3
Chevrolet	Potter Racing	64	Mike Potter		7
Chevrolet	Potter Racing	64	Brad Teague		1
Chevrolet	Richard Childress Racing	22	Rodney Combs		2
Chevrolet	Ronnie Thomas	41	Ronnie Thomas		1
Chevrolet	Terry Petris	62	Terry Petris		1
Ford	Arrington Racing	67	Buddy Arrington	Joey Arrington	7
Ford	Arrington Racing	67	Ken Schrader	Joey Arrington	1
Ford	Arrington Racing	67	Rick Jeffrey	Joey Arrington	3
Ford	Arrington Racing	67	Jimmy Hensley	Joey Arrington	1
Ford	Arrington Racing	67	Dale Jarrett	Joey Arrington	1
Ford	Arrington Racing	67	Ron Esau	Joey Arrington	6
Ford	Arrington Racing	67	Brad Teague	Joey Arrington	5
Ford	Autosports Enterprises	19	Chad Little	Chuck Little	2
Ford	Jefferson Racing	19	Chad Little	Chuck Little	1
Ford	Joe Booher	41	Joe Booher		1
Ford	Stoke Racing	19	Chad Little	Chuck Little	2
Ford	Stoke Racing	32	Ruben Garcia		1
Ford	Testa Racing	68	Derrike Cope	Dave Fuge	27
Ford	Wangerin Racing	39	Blackie Wangerin		3
Oldsmobile	A. J. Foyt Enterprises	14	A. J. Foyt	Tex Powell	7
Oldsmobile	B&B Racing	23	Eddie Bierschwale	Buddy Parrott	20
Oldsmobile	Bob Clark Motorsports	32	Lee Faulk		2
Oldsmobile	Collins Racing	24	Gary Collins		1
Oldsmobile	Gordon Chilson	16	Bob Schacht		2
Oldsmobile	Gordon Chilson	16	Tom Rotsell		1
Oldsmobile	Hess Racing	40	Ben Hess		6
Oldsmobile	KC Racing	66	John Krebs		2
Oldsmobile	Moroso Racing	22	Rob Moroso	Gary Nelson	1
Oldsmobile	Pro-Star Motorsports	38	Mike Laws		3
Pontiac	Bahre Racing	20	Dave Mader III	Gary Nelson	3
Pontiac	David Simko	51	David Simko		2
Pontiac	Dingman Brothers Racing	50	Greg Sacks	Billy Dingman	9
Pontiac	Dingman Brothers Racing	50	Charlie Glotzbach	Billy Dingman	1
Pontiac	Dingman Brothers Racing	50	Bobby Coyle	Billy Dingman	1
Pontiac	H. B. Bailey	36	H. B. Bailey		8
Pontiac	Mark Gibson	59	Mark Gibson		4

== Schedule ==
No.	Race title	Track	Date
	Busch Clash	Daytona International Speedway, Daytona Beach	February 7
	Twin 125 Qualifiers	Daytona International Speedway, Daytona Beach	February 11
1	Daytona 500	Daytona International Speedway, Daytona Beach	February 14
2	Pontiac Excitement 400	Richmond Fairgrounds Raceway, Richmond	February 21
	Goodyear NASCAR 500	Calder Park Thunderdome, Melbourne	February 28
3	Goodwrench 500	North Carolina Motor Speedway, Rockingham	March 6
4	Motorcraft Quality Parts 500	Atlanta International Raceway, Hampton	March 20
5	TranSouth 500	Darlington Raceway, Darlington	March 27
6	Valleydale Meats 500	Bristol International Raceway, Bristol	April 10
7	First Union 400	North Wilkesboro Speedway, North Wilkesboro	April 17
8	Pannill Sweatshirts 500	Martinsville Speedway, Ridgeway	April 24
9	Winston 500	Alabama International Motor Speedway, Talladega	May 1
	Winston Open	Charlotte Motor Speedway, Concord	May 22
	The Winston	Charlotte Motor Speedway, Concord	May 22
10	Coca-Cola 600	Charlotte Motor Speedway, Concord	May 29
11	Budweiser 500	Dover Downs International Speedway, Dover	June 5
12	Budweiser 400	Riverside International Raceway, Riverside	June 12
13	Miller High Life 500	Pocono International Raceway, Long Pond	June 19
14	Miller High Life 400	Michigan International Speedway, Brooklyn	June 26
15	Pepsi Firecracker 400	Daytona International Speedway, Daytona Beach	July 2
16	AC Spark Plug 500	Pocono International Raceway, Long Pond	July 24
17	Talladega DieHard 500	Alabama International Motor Speedway, Talladega	July 31
18	Budweiser at The Glen	Watkins Glen International, Watkins Glen	August 14
19	Champion Spark Plug 400	Michigan International Speedway, Brooklyn	August 21
20	Busch 500	Bristol International Raceway, Bristol	August 27
21	Southern 500	Darlington Raceway, Darlington	September 4
22	Miller High Life 400	Richmond Fairgrounds Raceway, Richmond	September 11
23	Delaware 500	Dover Downs International Speedway, Dover	September 18
24	Goody's 500	Martinsville Speedway, Ridgeway	September 25
25	Oakwood Homes 500	Charlotte Motor Speedway, Concord	October 9
26	Holly Farms 400	North Wilkesboro Speedway, North Wilkesboro	October 16
27	AC Delco 500	North Carolina Motor Speedway, Rockingham	October 23
28	Checker 500	Phoenix International Raceway, Phoenix	November 6
29	Atlanta Journal 500	Atlanta International Raceway, Hampton	November 20
	NASCAR Christmas 500	Calder Park Thunderdome, Melbourne	December 18

== Races ==
No.	Race	Pole position	Most laps led	Winning driver	Manufacturer
	Busch Clash	Geoff Bodine	Dale Earnhardt	Dale Earnhardt	Chevrolet
	Twin 125 #1	Ken Schrader	Bobby Allison	Bobby Allison	Buick
	Twin 125 #2	Davey Allison	Darrell Waltrip	Darrell Waltrip	Chevrolet
1	Daytona 500	Ken Schrader	Bobby Allison	Bobby Allison	Buick
2	Pontiac Excitement 400	Morgan Shepherd	Dale Earnhardt	Neil Bonnett	Pontiac
3	Goodwrench 500	Bill Elliott	Neil Bonnett	Neil Bonnett	Pontiac
4	Motorcraft Quality Parts 500	Geoff Bodine	Dale Earnhardt	Dale Earnhardt	Chevrolet
5	TranSouth 500	Ken Schrader	Lake Speed	Lake Speed	Oldsmobile
6	Valleydale Meats 500	Rick Wilson	Harry Gant	Bill Elliott	Ford
7	First Union 400	Terry Labonte	Dale Earnhardt	Terry Labonte	Chevrolet
8	Pannill Sweatshirts 500	Ricky Rudd	Dale Earnhardt	Dale Earnhardt	Chevrolet
9	Winston 500	Davey Allison	Geoff Bodine	Phil Parsons	Oldsmobile
	Winston Open	Ken Schrader	Brett Bodine	Sterling Marlin	Oldsmobile
	The Winston	Darrell Waltrip	Darrell Waltrip	Terry Labonte	Chevrolet
10	Coca-Cola 600	Davey Allison	Rick Wilson	Darrell Waltrip	Chevrolet
11	Budweiser 500	Alan Kulwicki	Bill Elliott	Bill Elliott	Ford
12	Budweiser 400	Ricky Rudd	Rusty Wallace	Rusty Wallace	Pontiac
13	Miller High Life 500	Alan Kulwicki	Geoff Bodine	Geoff Bodine	Chevrolet
14	Miller High Life 400	Bill Elliott	Rusty Wallace	Rusty Wallace	Pontiac
15	Pepsi Firecracker 400	Darrell Waltrip	Dale Earnhardt	Bill Elliott	Ford
16	AC Spark Plug 500	Morgan Shepherd	Bill Elliott	Bill Elliott	Ford
17	Talladega DieHard 500	Darrell Waltrip	Darrell Waltrip	Ken Schrader	Chevrolet
18	Budweiser at The Glen	Geoff Bodine	Bill Elliott	Ricky Rudd	Buick
19	Champion Spark Plug 400	Bill Elliott	Rusty Wallace	Davey Allison	Ford
20	Busch 500	Alan Kulwicki	Dale Earnhardt	Dale Earnhardt	Chevrolet
21	Southern 500	Bill Elliott	Bill Elliott	Bill Elliott	Ford
22	Miller High Life 400	Davey Allison	Davey Allison	Davey Allison	Ford
23	Delaware 500	Mark Martin	Bill Elliott	Bill Elliott	Ford
24	Goody's 500	Rusty Wallace	Ricky Rudd	Darrell Waltrip	Chevrolet
25	Oakwood Homes 500	Alan Kulwicki	Dale Earnhardt	Rusty Wallace	Pontiac
26	Holly Farms 400	Bill Elliott	Ricky Rudd	Rusty Wallace	Pontiac
27	AC Delco 500	Bill Elliott	Bill Elliott	Rusty Wallace	Pontiac
28	Checker 500	Geoff Bodine	Ricky Rudd	Alan Kulwicki	Ford
29	Atlanta Journal 500	Rusty Wallace	Rusty Wallace	Rusty Wallace	Pontiac

=== Busch Clash ===
The Busch Clash, an invitational event for all Busch Pole winners the previous season, was held February 7 at Daytona International Speedway. Geoff Bodine drew the pole.

Top ten results

1. #3 - Dale Earnhardt
2. #28 - Davey Allison
3. #12 - Bobby Allison
4. #5 - Geoff Bodine
5. #9 - Bill Elliott
6. #27 - Rusty Wallace
7. #25 - Ken Schrader
8. #97 - Morgan Shepherd
9. #11 - Terry Labonte
10. #33 - Harry Gant
- Tim Richmond was eligible to race in this event, but was without a ride.

=== Gatorade 125s ===
The Gatorade 125s, a pair of qualifying races for the Daytona 500, were held February 11 at Daytona International Speedway. Ken Schrader and Davey Allison won the poles for the races.

Race one: top ten results

1. #12 - Bobby Allison
2. #27 - Rusty Wallace
3. #25 - Ken Schrader
4. #50 - Greg Sacks
5. #8 - Bobby Hillin Jr.
6. #97 - Morgan Shepherd
7. #4 - Rick Wilson
8. #5 - Geoff Bodine
9. #14 - A. J. Foyt
10. #55 - Phil Parsons

Race two: top ten results

1. #17 - Darrell Waltrip
2. #3 - Dale Earnhardt
3. #28 - Davey Allison
4. #11 - Terry Labonte
5. #83 - Lake Speed
6. #44 - Sterling Marlin
7. #75 - Neil Bonnett
8. #7 - Alan Kulwicki
9. #88 - Buddy Baker
10. #33 - Harry Gant

=== Daytona 500 ===
The Daytona 500, was held February 14, 1988, at Daytona International Speedway in Daytona Beach, Florida. Ken Schrader won the pole.

Top ten results

1. #12 - Bobby Allison
2. #28 - Davey Allison
3. #55 - Phil Parsons
4. #75 - Neil Bonnett
5. #11 - Terry Labonte
6. #25 - Ken Schrader
7. #27 - Rusty Wallace
8. #44 - Sterling Marlin
9. #88 - Buddy Baker
10. #3 - Dale Earnhardt

Failed to qualify: #34 - Donnie Allison, #07 - Larry Moyer, #82 - Mark Stahl, #18 - Sarel van der Merwe, #85 - Bobby Gerhart, #2 - Ernie Irvan, #30 - Michael Waltrip*, #67 - Buddy Arrington, #10 - Ken Bouchard, #24 - Bobby Coyle, #01 - Mickey Gibbs, #77 - Ken Ragan, #63 - Jocko Maggiacomo, #03 - David Pletcher, #54 - Ronnie Sanders, #80 - Jimmy Horton, #0 - Delma Cowart, #59 - Mark Gibson, #70 - J.D. McDuffie, #48 - Tony Spanos, #74 - John Linville, #02 - Joe Booher, #64 - Mike Potter, #39 - Blackie Wangerin, #56 - Joey Sonntag, #57 - Bobby Wawak, #49 - Mike Porter

- This was Bobby Allison's final career victory.
- Michael Waltrip drove Jim Sauter's #89 Pontiac in the race after failing to qualify.

=== Pontiac Excitement 400 ===
The Pontiac Excitement 400 was held February 21 at Richmond Fairgrounds Raceway. Morgan Shepherd won the pole.

Top ten results

1. #75 - Neil Bonnett
2. #26 - Ricky Rudd
3. #43 - Richard Petty*
4. #17 - Darrell Waltrip
5. #44 - Sterling Marlin
6. #83 - Lake Speed
7. #27 - Rusty Wallace
8. #8 - Bobby Hillin Jr.
9. #11 - Terry Labonte
10. #3 - Dale Earnhardt

Failed to qualify: #2 - Ernie Irvan, #4 - Rick Wilson, #25* - Ken Schrader

- Ken Schrader's team bought the #67 entry (normally driven by Buddy Arrington) in order to get Schrader into the race.
- This was the last race on the half-mile Richmond Fairgrounds Raceway. After the race, workers immediately began to convert the track into a more modern-looking, 3/4-mile oval.
- A scoring error failed to show that Neil Bonnett was one lap down after making a green flag pit stop. A post-race protest filed by Ricky Rudd's car owner Kenny Bernstein did not resolve the NASCAR scoring error and Bonnett's win stood even though a review of the race tape showed that Rudd should have won.
- Last career top 5 finish for Richard Petty.
- This race marked the first victory for RahMoc Enterprises since the Atlanta Journal 500 in 1983; the penultimate race of Neil Bonnett's first stint with RahMoc.

=== Goodyear NASCAR 500 ===
The Goodyear NASCAR 500 was a non-points exhibition race held on February 28 at the Calder Park Thunderdome in Melbourne, Australia - the first NASCAR-style high-banked paved oval built outside of North America. It was also the first NASCAR sanctioned race outside of North America. Neil Bonnett won the pole.

Top ten results

1. #75 - Neil Bonnett
2. #12 - Bobby Allison
3. #71 - Dave Marcis
4. #18 - Glen Steurer
5. #83 - Sumner McKnight
6. #98 - Hershel McGriff
7. #15 - Terry Petris
8. #19 - Chad Little
9. #82 - Jim Danielson
10. #21 - Kyle Petty
- Out of 32 starters, seven were Australian, and one (Jim Richards) was from New Zealand. And out of all local drivers, only Allan Grice had previously competed in a Winston Cup points event, having raced in the 1987 Coca-Cola 600. The 'visiting' American drivers were a mix of those from the Winston Cup and Winston West Series.
- The Thunderdome, a 1.119 mi (1.801 km) track with 24° banking in the turns, was actually modelled on a scaled down version of the Charlotte Motor Speedway and was opened in 1987.
- As the race was run in Australia where the metric system is used, the '500' was actually 500 kilometers (310 miles), or around the same distance as a Busch Series race.
- Bonnett's pole speed was 139.734 mp/h. The race's average speed over the 280 laps was 101.67 mp/h. 52 laps were run under caution.

=== Goodwrench 500 ===
The Goodwrench 500 was held March 6 at North Carolina Motor Speedway. Bill Elliott won the pole.

Top ten results

1. #75 - Neil Bonnett*
2. #83 - Lake Speed
3. #44 - Sterling Marlin
4. #7 - Alan Kulwicki
5. #3 - Dale Earnhardt
6. #9 - Bill Elliott
7. #97 - Morgan Shepherd
8. #10 - Ken Bouchard
9. #28 - Davey Allison
10. #25 - Ken Schrader

Failed to qualify: Billy Fulcher, Howard Mark, Dave Pletcher, D. Wayne Strout, #48 - Tony Spanos

- This was Bonnett's final Cup Series victory as well as his final top-5 finish. It is also the last victory for RahMoc Enterprises.

=== Motorcraft Quality Parts 500 ===
The Motorcraft Quality Parts 500 was held March 20 at Atlanta International Raceway. Geoff Bodine won the pole.

Top ten results

1. #3 - Dale Earnhardt
2. #27 - Rusty Wallace
3. #17 - Darrell Waltrip
4. #11 - Terry Labonte
5. #21 - Kyle Petty
6. #8 - Bobby Hillin Jr.
7. #88 - Buddy Baker
8. #25 - Ken Schrader
9. #15 - Brett Bodine
10. #4 - Rick Wilson

Failed to qualify: Donnie Allison, #01 - Mickey Gibbs, #1 - Dale Jarrett, #03 - Dave Pletcher, #22 - Steve Moore, #50 - Greg Sacks, #63 - Jocko Maggiacomo, #67 - Buddy Arrington, #80 - Jimmy Horton, #86 - Rick Jeffrey, #93 - Charlie Baker

- This race marked Dale Earnhardt's first points-paying victory with GM Goodwrench as the primary sponsor.

=== TranSouth 500 ===
The TranSouth 500 was held March 27 at Darlington Raceway. Ken Schrader won the pole.

Top ten results

1. #83 - Lake Speed*
2. #7 - Alan Kulwicki
3. #28 - Davey Allison
4. #9 - Bill Elliott
5. #44 - Sterling Marlin
6. #6 - Mark Martin
7. #5 - Geoff Bodine
8. #55 - Phil Parsons
9. #12 - Bobby Allison
10. #88 - Buddy Baker

Failed to qualify: none

- This was Lake Speed's only victory in the Winston Cup Series.

=== Valleydale Meats 500 ===
The Valleydale Meats 500 was held April 10 at Bristol International Raceway. Rick Wilson won the pole.

Top ten results

1. #9 - Bill Elliott
2. #6 - Mark Martin
3. #5 - Geoff Bodine
4. #27 - Rusty Wallace
5. #12 - Bobby Allison
6. #43 - Richard Petty
7. #21 - Kyle Petty
8. #44 - Sterling Marlin
9. #71 - Dave Marcis
10. #25 - Ken Schrader

Failed to qualify: #64 - Mike Potter, #97 - Rodney Combs, #98 - Brad Noffsinger

=== First Union 400 ===
The First Union 400 was held April 17 at North Wilkesboro Speedway. Terry Labonte won the pole.

Top ten results

1. #11 - Terry Labonte*
2. #26 - Ricky Rudd
3. #3 - Dale Earnhardt
4. #27 - Rusty Wallace
5. #21 - Kyle Petty
6. #43 - Richard Petty
7. #55 - Phil Parsons
8. #28 - Davey Allison
9. #5 - Geoff Bodine
10. #9 - Bill Elliott

Failed to qualify: #00 - Gary Brooks, #04 - Bill Meacham, #09 - Doug French, #20 - Alan Russell, #31 - Brad Teague, #46 - Glenn Moffat, #67 - Rick Jeffrey, #70 - Jeff McDuffie, #78 - Jay Sommers, #98 - Brad Noffsinger

- Labonte passed Dale Earnhardt with 10 laps to go when Earnhardt's right-rear tire began to lose air.

=== Pannill Sweatshirts 500 ===
The Pannill Sweatshirts 500 was held April 24 at Martinsville Speedway. Ricky Rudd won the pole.

Top ten results

1. #3 - Dale Earnhardt
2. #44 - Sterling Marlin
3. #8 - Bobby Hillin Jr.
4. #11 - Terry Labonte
5. #17 - Darrell Waltrip
6. #28 - Davey Allison
7. #88 - Buddy Baker
8. #12 - Bobby Allison
9. #55 - Phil Parsons
10. #25 - Ken Schrader

Failed to qualify: #2 - Ernie Irvan, #52 - Jimmy Means

=== Winston 500 ===
The Winston 500 was held May 1 at Alabama International Motor Speedway. Davey Allison won the pole.

Top ten results

1. #55 - Phil Parsons*
2. #12 - Bobby Allison*
3. #5 - Geoff Bodine
4. #11 - Terry Labonte
5. #25 - Ken Schrader
6. #44 - Sterling Marlin
7. #9 - Bill Elliott
8. #21 - Kyle Petty
9. #3 - Dale Earnhardt
10. #27 - Rusty Wallace

Failed to qualify: #10 - Ken Bouchard, #80 - Jimmy Horton, #95 - Trevor Boys, #99 - Connie Saylor

- During the race, A. J. Foyt had a series of incidents and penalties. He intentionally wrecked Alan Kulwicki, spun out on pit road out of anger, and drove through several pit stalls doing pass-through penalties, nearly hurting many pit crew members. For his actions, Foyt was issued a six-month ban from NASCAR (later reduced to two months following an appeal).
- This was Phil Parsons' first and only victory in the Winston Cup Series.
- Last Top-5 finish for Bobby Allison in a points-paying race.

=== The Winston ===
The Winston, an annual invitational race for previous winners in Winston Cup along with the winner of the same day Winston Open, was held May 22 at Charlotte Motor Speedway. Ken Schrader won the pole for the Winston Open, and Darrell Waltrip won the pole for The Winston. The winner of the Open would transfer to the main event.

Top ten results (Open)

1. #44 - Sterling Marlin
2. #7 - Alan Kulwicki
3. #88 - Buddy Baker
4. #90 - Benny Parsons
5. #68 - Derrike Cope
6. #15 - Brett Bodine
7. #25 - Ken Schrader
8. #71 - Dave Marcis
9. #4 - Rick Wilson
10. #1 - Dale Jarrett

Top ten results

1. #11 - Terry Labonte
2. #44 - Sterling Marlin
3. #28 - Davey Allison
4. #9 - Bill Elliott
5. #12 - Bobby Allison
6. #21 - Kyle Petty
7. #3 - Dale Earnhardt
8. #47 - Morgan Shepherd
9. #17 - Darrell Waltrip
10. #75 - Neil Bonnett
- Tim Richmond was eligible to run The Winston, but he chose not to participate due to an ongoing legal dispute with NASCAR after he was suspended for testing positive for banned substances earlier during the season.
- Richard Petty was eligible to run the race as a past winner, but was eliminated when Phil Parsons won the Winston 500.
- Last overall Top-5 finish for Bobby Allison.

=== Coca-Cola 600 ===
The Coca-Cola 600 was held May 29 at Charlotte Motor Speedway. Davey Allison won the pole.

Top ten results

1. #17 - Darrell Waltrip
2. #27 - Rusty Wallace
3. #7 - Alan Kulwicki
4. #15 - Brett Bodine
5. #28 - Davey Allison
6. #25 - Ken Schrader
7. #26 - Ricky Rudd*
8. #55 - Phil Parsons
9. #11 - Terry Labonte
10. #50 - Greg Sacks

Failed to qualify: Donnie Allison, #16 - Larry Pearson, #67 - Buddy Arrington, #70 - J.D. McDuffie, #82 - Mark Stahl, #93 - Charlie Baker

- Prior to the race, Goodyear withdrew their tires after practice when it was discovered that their compound was too soft for the track; as a result, all drivers except Dave Marcis switched to Hoosiers over safety concerns. Goodyear offered Daytona-spec tires for those who wanted them, while NASCAR would issue a mandatory caution on Lap 25 to check the condition of the tires.
- Ricky Rudd was relieved during the race by Mike Alexander, as Rudd had injured his knee in a crash during The Winston the previous week.
- This race was marred by several hard accidents that resulted in driver injuries.
  - Harry Gant suffered a compound fracture in his leg during a crash, forcing him to miss the next five races.
  - Buddy Baker suffered a hard crash on lap 243 that resulted in a blood clot in his brain.
  - Neil Bonnett crashed and cracked several ribs.
  - Rick Wilson, who led 107 laps, crashed after a tire failure, suffering a broken shoulder blade.
- The injuries weren't limited to drivers, as Bud Moore Engineering owner Bud Moore suffered a broken leg when his driver, Brett Bodine, ran over him during a pit stop.
- Dale Earnhardt was issued a five lap penalty after spinning out Geoff Bodine early in the race. He would finish 13th, 6 laps down.
- This race made sure no driver would win 3 out of 4 Crown Jewel races meaning no driver would win the Winston Million in 1988. However the $100,000 bonus to a driver winning 2 out of 4 Crown Jewel races was still alive for the Southern 500 later in the season.

=== Budweiser 500 ===
The Budweiser 500 was held June 5 at Dover Downs International Speedway. Alan Kulwicki won the pole.

Top ten results

1. #9 - Bill Elliott
2. #33 - Morgan Shepherd*
3. #27 - Rusty Wallace
4. #83 - Lake Speed
5. #28 - Davey Allison
6. #7 - Alan Kulwicki
7. #4 - Rick Wilson
8. #5 - Geoff Bodine
9. #6 - Mark Martin
10. #12 - Bobby Allison*

Failed to qualify: #67 - Buddy Arrington

- Morgan Shepherd was subbing for Harry Gant, who had been injured (broken leg) during the Coca-Cola 600 race the previous weekend.
- Last Top 10 finish for Bobby Allison.

=== Budweiser 400 ===
The final Budweiser 400 was held June 12 at Riverside International Raceway. Ricky Rudd won the pole. It was the last NASCAR race held at Riverside before the track's closure.

Top ten results

1. #27 - Rusty Wallace
2. #11 - Terry Labonte
3. #26 - Ricky Rudd
4. #3 - Dale Earnhardt
5. #55 - Phil Parsons
6. #43 - Richard Petty*
7. #6 - Mark Martin
8. #29 - Dale Jarrett
9. #44 - Sterling Marlin
10. #75 - Neil Bonnett

Failed to qualify: #03 - Howard Mark, #10 - Ken Bouchard, #14W - Butch Gilliland, #16W - Reno Fontana, #20W - Scott Gaylord, #22W - St. James Davis, #41W - Jack Sellers, #45 - Billy Fulcher, #46W - Marta Leonard, #48 - Tony Spanos, #50W - George Follmer, #67 - Ron Esau, #74W - Ray Kelly, #81W - Glen Steurer, #82W - Jim Danielson, #85W - Sumner McKnight, #89W - Bob Howard, #97 - Rodney Combs

- For this race, Richard Petty was forced to go to a backup car, which was a 1987 Pontiac Grand Prix 2+2.
- Bobby Allison would finish in 22nd place, 2 laps down. This would be the final race he completed before suffering career-ending injuries at Pocono the following week.

=== Miller High Life 500 ===
The Miller High Life 500 was held June 19 at Pocono International Raceway. Alan Kulwicki won the pole.

Top ten results

1. #5 - Geoff Bodine
2. #30 - Michael Waltrip
3. #27 - Rusty Wallace
4. #6 - Mark Martin
5. #28 - Davey Allison
6. #17 - Darrell Waltrip
7. #88 - Buddy Baker
8. #55 - Phil Parsons
9. #25 - Ken Schrader
10. #9 - Bill Elliott

Failed to qualify: Steve Moore, #64 - Mike Potter, #70 - J.D. McDuffie

- On the opening lap of this race, Bobby Allison suffered career-ending injuries when he spun and was T-boned by Jocko Maggiacomo.

=== Miller High Life 400 (Michigan) ===
The Miller High Life 400 was held June 26 at Michigan International Speedway. Bill Elliott won the pole.

Top ten results

1. #27 - Rusty Wallace
2. #9 - Bill Elliott
3. #11 - Terry Labonte
4. #3 - Dale Earnhardt
5. #5 - Geoff Bodine
6. #25 - Ken Schrader
7. #55 - Phil Parsons
8. #17 - Darrell Waltrip
9. #29 - Cale Yarborough
10. #12 - Mike Alexander*

Failed to qualify: Connie Saylor, Jay Sommers, #70 - J.D. McDuffie, #80 - Jimmy Horton

- Mike Alexander would take over Bobby Allison's #12 Buick for the remainder of the season.

=== Pepsi Firecracker 400 ===
The Pepsi Firecracker 400 was held July 2 at Daytona International Speedway. Darrell Waltrip won the pole.

Top ten results

1. #9 - Bill Elliott*
2. #4 - Rick Wilson*
3. #55 - Phil Parsons
4. #3 - Dale Earnhardt
5. #17 - Darrell Waltrip
6. #88 - Buddy Baker
7. #33 - Morgan Shepherd
8. #25 - Ken Schrader
9. #83 - Lake Speed
10. #50 - Greg Sacks

Failed to qualify: Ronnie Sanders, Ricky Woodward, #0 - Delma Cowart, #32 - Philip Duffie, #39 - Blackie Wangerin, #59 - Mark Gibson, #73 - Phil Barkdoll, #76 - Hut Stricklin, #80 - Jimmy Horton, #98 - Brad Noffsinger

- This was the first Pepsi Firecracker 400 run with restrictor plates since 1973.
- Bill Elliott charged from 38th starting position, and nearly fell a lap down at one point. On the final lap, Elliott battled with Rick Wilson out of the final turn, with Elliott taking the win by 18 inches.
- This would be Wilson's best career Cup Series finish.
- This race marked the final start at Daytona for Cale Yarborough. He would crash out on lap 2 and finish 41st.
- This was the first Pepsi Firecracker 400 to not take place on July 4. Before this year, the race was always held on the Fourth of July, regardless of the day of the week. Starting in 1988, the race was moved to the first Saturday of July, where it would remain until 2019. The race would be run on July 4 only two more times, in 1992 and 2009.

=== AC Spark Plug 500 ===
The AC Spark Plug 500 was held July 24 at Pocono International Raceway. Morgan Shepherd won the pole.

Top ten results

1. #9 - Bill Elliott
2. #25 - Ken Schrader
3. #28 - Davey Allison
4. #5 - Geoff Bodine
5. #17 - Darrell Waltrip
6. #75 - Morgan Shepherd*
7. #6 - Mark Martin
8. #7 - Alan Kulwicki
9. #11 - Terry Labonte
10. #33 - Harry Gant*

Failed to qualify: Ben Hess, #48 - Tony Spanos, #67 - Ron Esau, #70 - J.D. McDuffie, #93 - Charlie Baker

- Morgan Shepherd drove the #75 in place of Neil Bonnett for this race and Talladega.
- This race marked Harry Gant's return to racing since breaking his leg at Charlotte.
- Goodyear was disallowed from using their tires in this race after a pre-race inspection found that the tires had too wide of a tread. This marked the first time since the 1956 Southern 500 that Goodyear did not supply tires for a NASCAR race.

=== Talladega DieHard 500 ===
The Talladega DieHard 500 was held July 31 at Talladega Superspeedway. Darrell Waltrip won the pole.

Top ten results

1. #25 - Ken Schrader*
2. #5 - Geoff Bodine
3. #3 - Dale Earnhardt
4. #4 - Rick Wilson
5. #27 - Rusty Wallace
6. #44 - Sterling Marlin
7. #6 - Mark Martin
8. #9 - Bill Elliott
9. #29 - Cale Yarborough
10. #88 - Buddy Baker*

Failed to qualify: #0 - Delma Cowart, #07 - Larry Moyer, #32 - Philip Duffie, #59 - Mark Gibson, #70 - J.D. McDuffie, #76 - Hut Stricklin, #86 - Rick Jeffrey, #95 - Slick Johnson

- This was Ken Schrader's first career Winston Cup Series victory, and the final victory for Harry Hyde.
- This was Buddy Baker's final top ten finish in the Cup Series and his final start of 1988 as the blood clot he suffered at Charlotte ended his season.
- This was also Cale Yarborough's final top ten finish in the Cup Series.

=== Budweiser at The Glen ===
The Budweiser at The Glen was held August 14 at Watkins Glen International. Geoff Bodine won the pole.

Top ten results

1. #26 - Ricky Rudd
2. #27 - Rusty Wallace
3. #9 - Bill Elliott
4. #55 - Phil Parsons
5. #12 - Mike Alexander
6. #3 - Dale Earnhardt
7. #88 - Morgan Shepherd*
8. #44 - Sterling Marlin
9. #31 - Joe Ruttman*
10. #25 - Ken Schrader

Failed to qualify: Phil Good

- This was the best finish in the Winston Cup Series for Bob Clark's #31 Slender You Figure Salons team. Despite this, Joe Ruttman would abruptly resign from the Slender You team shortly before the following race at Michigan.
- Much like Goodyear at Pocono, Hoosier was disallowed after the tread on their tires was discovered to be too wide.
- Final race for Jocko Maggiacomo; who finished 35th in this race, the first race he attempted after the crash in Pocono that ended the career of Bobby Allison. Maggiacomo would attempt to qualify for the fall Charlotte and Rockingham races; failing to make the field in either track.

=== Champion Spark Plug 400 ===
The Champion Spark Plug 400 was held August 21 at Michigan International Speedway. Bill Elliott won the pole.

Top ten results

1. #28 - Davey Allison
2. #27 - Rusty Wallace
3. #9 - Bill Elliott
4. #88 - Morgan Shepherd
5. #83 - Lake Speed
6. #15 - Brett Bodine
7. #30 - Michael Waltrip
8. #21 - Kyle Petty
9. #4 - Rick Wilson
10. #5 - Geoff Bodine

Failed to qualify: #06 - Lee Raymond, #07 - Larry Moyer, #38 - Mike Laws, #40 - Ben Hess, #51 - David Simko, #67 - Ron Esau, #70 - J.D. McDuffie, #80 - Jimmy Horton, #95 - Slick Johnson

- Donnie Allison made his final career Cup Series start in this race. Allison suffered an engine failure on lap 114 and finished 35th.

=== Busch 500 ===
The Busch 500 was held August 27 at Bristol International Raceway. Alan Kulwicki won the pole.

Top ten results

1. #3 - Dale Earnhardt
2. #9 - Bill Elliott*
3. #5 - Geoff Bodine
4. #28 - Davey Allison
5. #7 - Alan Kulwicki
6. #33 - Harry Gant
7. #17 - Darrell Waltrip
8. #43 - Richard Petty
9. #27 - Rusty Wallace*
10. #8 - Bobby Hillin Jr.

Failed to qualify: #10 - Ken Bouchard, #32 - Lee Falk, #41 - Ronnie Thomas, #52 - Jimmy Means, #57 - Morgan Shepherd, #64 - Mike Potter, #70 - J.D. McDuffie, #90 - Benny Parsons

- During practice on Friday, Rusty Wallace wrecked and barrel-rolled down the frontstretch, knocking him unconscious. ESPN pit reporter Dr. Jerry Punch was the first person on the scene and actually revived Wallace. Wallace would recover, and started the race Saturday night, but eventually turned the car over to relief driver Larry Pearson.
- Bill Elliott finished seven positions ahead of Rusty Wallace, allowing Elliott to take the championship lead, which he would hold for the rest of the season.
- Rick Mast made his Cup Series debut in this race. Mast crashed out on lap 207 and finished 28th.

=== Southern 500 ===
The Southern 500 was held September 4 at Darlington Raceway. Bill Elliott won the pole.

Top ten results

1. #9 - Bill Elliott
2. #27 - Rusty Wallace
3. #3 - Dale Earnhardt
4. #17 - Darrell Waltrip
5. #44 - Sterling Marlin
6. #55 - Phil Parsons
7. #5 - Geoff Bodine
8. #11 - Terry Labonte
9. #28 - Davey Allison
10. #26 - Ricky Rudd

Failed to qualify: Slick Johnson, Ricky Woodward, #04 - Hershel McGriff, #64 - Mike Potter, #98 - Brad Noffsinger

=== Miller High Life 400 (Richmond) ===
The Miller High Life 400 was held September 11 at Richmond International Raceway (formerly known as Richmond Fairgrounds Raceway). Davey Allison won the pole. This was the first Cup Series race on the new 3/4-mile Richmond International Raceway.

Top ten results

1. #28 - Davey Allison*
2. #3 - Dale Earnhardt
3. #11 - Terry Labonte
4. #6 - Mark Martin
5. #7 - Alan Kulwicki
6. #21 - Kyle Petty
7. #9 - Bill Elliott
8. #17 - Darrell Waltrip
9. #75 - Neil Bonnett
10. #71 - Dave Marcis

Failed to qualify: #68 - Derrike Cope, #20 - Rayvon Clark, #37 - Randy Morrison, #40 - Ben Hess, #54 - Lennie Pond, #67 - Ron Esau, #70 - J. D. McDuffie, #78 - Jay Sommers, #98 - Brad Noffsinger

- This was Allison's first short track victory in the Cup Series, and his first Cup victory from the pole.
- An unusual sidebar regarding the Goodyear vs. Hoosier tire war led to controversy on the starting lineup. At the time, the rules stated that if a driver switched tire brands between qualifying and the race, they would give up their starting position and start at the rear. However, when race day arrived at Richmond, roughly half the field - including 4 of the top 5 in points coming in (Earnhardt, Elliott, Rusty Wallace and Labonte) - elected to switch tire brands, an unprecedented action that led to confusion with NASCAR officials that continued through the day of the race itself.

=== Delaware 500 ===
The Delaware 500 was held September 18 at Dover International Speedway. Mark Martin won the pole.

Top ten results

1. #9 - Bill Elliott
2. #3 - Dale Earnhardt
3. #27 - Rusty Wallace
4. #28 - Davey Allison
5. #5 - Geoff Bodine
6. #21 - Kyle Petty
7. #12 - Mike Alexander
8. #75 - Neil Bonnett
9. #83 - Lake Speed
10. #26 - Ricky Rudd

Failed to qualify: Bobby Gerhart, Ben Hess, James Hylton, Rick Jeffrey, Graham Taylor, #20 - Rayvon Clark, #70 - J. D. McDuffie

- Mark Martin's pole was the first for Roush Racing in the Cup Series.
- Ken Bouchard (who would go on the win this season's rookie of the year) led the only 4 laps in his Cup career eventually finishing 25th completing 409 of 500 laps due to crashing the car.

=== Goody's 500 ===
The Goody's 500 was held September 25 at Martinsville Speedway. Rusty Wallace won the pole.

Top ten results

1. #17 - Darrell Waltrip
2. #7 - Alan Kulwicki
3. #27 - Rusty Wallace
4. #25 - Ken Schrader
5. #5 - Geoff Bodine
6. #9 - Bill Elliott
7. #11 - Terry Labonte
8. #3 - Dale Earnhardt
9. #6 - Mark Martin
10. #15 - Brett Bodine

Failed to qualify: #20 - Dave Mader III, #31 - Lee Faulk, #70 - J. D. McDuffie, #97 - Rodney Combs, #98 - Brad Noffsinger

=== Oakwood Homes 500 ===
The Oakwood Homes 500 was held October 9 at Charlotte Motor Speedway. Alan Kulwicki won the pole.

Top ten results

1. #27 - Rusty Wallace
2. #17 - Darrell Waltrip
3. #15 - Brett Bodine
4. #9 - Bill Elliott
5. #44 - Sterling Marlin
6. #8 - Bobby Hillin Jr.
7. #25 - Ken Schrader
8. #26 - Ricky Rudd
9. #6 - Mark Martin
10. #11 - Terry Labonte

Failed to qualify: Gary Brooks, Slick Johnson, Johnny Rutherford, Ronnie Silver, #2 - Ernie Irvan, #19 - Chad Little, #22 - Rodney Combs, #24 - John McFadden, #32 - Philip Duffie, #34 - Connie Saylor, #36 - H. B. Bailey, #40 - Ben Hess, #50 - Charlie Glotzbach, #59 - Mark Gibson, #63 - Jocko Maggiacomo, #64 - Mike Potter, #70 - J. D. McDuffie, #74 - Randy LaJoie, #87 - Randy Baker, #93 - Troy Beebe, #98 - Brad Noffsinger

- Benny Parsons finished 12th after leading 13 laps, the last laps he would lead in his career.

=== Holly Farms 400 ===
The Holly Farms 400 at North Wilkesboro Speedway was originally scheduled for October 2, but two consecutive days of rain caused it to be postponed to October 16. Bill Elliott won the pole.

Top ten results

1. #27 - Rusty Wallace
2. #55 - Phil Parsons
3. #5 - Geoff Bodine
4. #11 - Terry Labonte
5. #9 - Bill Elliott
6. #3 - Dale Earnhardt
7. #26 - Ricky Rudd
8. #25 - Ken Schrader
9. #12 - Mike Alexander
10. #88 - Greg Sacks

Failed to qualify: Kevin Evans, Doug French, Alan Russell, Brad Teague, #38 - Mike Laws, #52 - Jimmy Means*, #70 - J. D. McDuffie, #98 - Brad Noffsinger

- Jimmy Means drove the #90 Ford in place of Benny Parsons in the race after failing to qualify.

=== AC Delco 500 ===
The AC Delco 500 was held October 23 at North Carolina Motor Speedway. Bill Elliott won the pole.

Top ten results

1. #27 - Rusty Wallace*
2. #26 - Ricky Rudd
3. #11 - Terry Labonte
4. #9 - Bill Elliott
5. #3 - Dale Earnhardt
6. #12 - Mike Alexander
7. #33 - Harry Gant
8. #55 - Phil Parsons
9. #21 - Kyle Petty
10. #75 - Neil Bonnett

Failed to qualify: Philip Duffie, Lee Raymond, D. Wayne Strout, #63 - Jocko Maggiacomo, #70 - J. D. McDuffie, #80 - Jimmy Horton, #93 - Charlie Baker

- Rusty Wallace's three consecutive victories reduced Bill Elliott's points lead to 79 points with two races left.

=== Checker 500 ===
The inaugural Checker 500 was held November 6 at Phoenix International Raceway. Geoff Bodine won the pole.

Top ten results

1. #7 - Alan Kulwicki*
2. #11 - Terry Labonte
3. #28 - Davey Allison
4. #9 - Bill Elliott*
5. #27 - Rusty Wallace
6. #5 - Geoff Bodine
7. #8 - Bobby Hillin Jr.
8. #90 - Benny Parsons*
9. #55 - Phil Parsons
10. #44 - Sterling Marlin

Failed to qualify: #14W - Butch Gilliland, #20W - Scott Gaylord, #22W - St. James Davis, #41W - Jack Sellers, #66W - John Krebs, #82W - Jim Danielson, #89W - Bob Howard, #95W - Harry Jefferson

- This was Alan Kulwicki's first career Winston Cup Series win. After taking the checkered flag, Kulwicki turned the car clockwise around and completed what he eventually referred to as a "Polish victory lap." Kulwicki, himself a Polish American, wanted to be able to wave to the fans directly from his driver's side window.
- This was Benny Parsons' final career top-10, finishing one spot ahead of younger brother Phil.
- 3rd-place points contender Dale Earnhardt was involved in an early crash with Joe Ruttman and lost a lap. Earnhardt would salvage an 11th-place finish, but the incident, and both Elliott and Wallace getting top-5s, effectively ended Earnhardt's chances of a third consecutive Cup title.
- Championship leader Bill Elliott finished one position ahead of Rusty Wallace, allowing him to maintain his 79-point lead going into the season finale in Atlanta.
- Ricky Rudd had a dominating run until overheating late in the race led to an engine failure. Rudd would finish 26th.

=== Atlanta Journal 500 ===
The Atlanta Journal 500 was held November 20 at Atlanta International Raceway. Rusty Wallace won the pole.

Top ten results

1. #27 - Rusty Wallace*
2. #28 - Davey Allison
3. #12 - Mike Alexander
4. #26 - Ricky Rudd
5. #17 - Darrell Waltrip
6. #25 - Ken Schrader
7. #30 - Michael Waltrip -1 Lap
8. #11 - Terry Labonte -1 Lap
9. #8 - Bobby Hillin Jr. -1 Lap
10. #29 - Cale Yarborough -1 Lap*

Failed to qualify: Don Hume, Bill Meacham, Alan Russell, Joe Ruttman, David Sosebee, #10 - Ken Bouchard, #20 - Dave Mader III, #38 - Mike Laws, #50 - Bobby Coyle, #78 - Jay Sommers, #93 - Charlie Baker

- By finishing 11th, Bill Elliott secured the 1988 NASCAR Winston Cup Series championship by 24 points over Rusty Wallace.
- Despite winning from the pole, and leading the most laps, Wallace was unable to overtake Elliott for the championship, as Elliott only needed to finish 18th or better to become champion.
- Benny Parsons, in his 525th and final career NASCAR start, crashed out on lap 140, finishing 34th.
- Cale Yarborough, in his 560th and final career NASCAR start, finished a lap down in 10th after starting 26th.
- Out of 42 starters, only 20 finished.
- Out of the 22 cars that fell out of the race, 16 of them were engine related.

=== NASCAR Christmas 500 ===
NASCAR made a second trip to Calder Park in December. The race counted as the third round of the 1989 NASCAR Australia Series season. Dave Marcis won the pole.

Top ten results

1. #75 - Morgan Shepherd
2. #94 - Sterling Marlin
3. #11 - Harry Gant -1 Lap
4. #21 - Trevor Boys -2 Laps
5. #57 - Rick Wilson -2 Laps
6. #12 - Rodney Combs -3 Laps
7. #71 - Dave Marcis -3 Laps
8. #3 - Allan Grice -4 Laps
9. #56 - Ron Esau -5 Laps
10. #18 - Glen Steurer -6 Laps

Failed to qualify: #4 - Win Percy, #05 - Peter Brock, #29 - Bill Mentiplay

- Out of 32 starters, eleven were Australian, and one (Jim Richards) was from New Zealand. Canada's Trevor Boys and Roy Smith also competed, and England's Win Percy attempted the race but did not make the field. The 'visiting' American drivers were a mix of those from the Winston Cup and Winston West Series.
- As the race was run in Australia where the metric system is used, the '500' was actually 500 kilometers (310 miles), or around the same distance as a Busch Series race.
- The race's average speed over the 280 laps was 112.007 mp/h.

== Full Drivers' Championship ==
(key) Bold – Pole position awarded by time. Italics – Pole position set by owner's points. * – Most laps led.

Pos	Driver	DAY	RCH	CAR	ATL	DAR	BRI	NWS	MAR	TAL	CLT	DOV	RIV	POC	MCH	DAY	POC	TAL	GLN	MCH	BRI	DAR	RCH	DOV	MAR	CLT	NWS	CAR	PHO	ATL	Pts
1	Bill Elliott	12	12	**6**	19	4	1	10	11	7	19	1*	16	10	**2**	1	1*	8	3	**3**	2	**1***	7	1*	6	4	**5**	**4***	4	11	4488
2	Rusty Wallace	7	7	14	2	25	4	4	16	10	2	3	1*	3	1*	12	24	5	2	2*	9	2	35	3	**3**	1	1	1*	5	**1***	4464
3	Dale Earnhardt	10	10*	5	1*	11	14	3*	1*	9	13	16	4	33	4	4	11	3	6	29	1*	3	2	2	8	17*	6	5	11	14	4256
4	Terry Labonte	5	9	31	4	23	16	**1**	4	4	9	12	2	32	3	19	9	14	18	13	22	8	3	18	7	10	4	3	2	8	4007
5	Ken Schrader	**6**	20	10	8	**29**	10	11	10	5	6	21	20	9	6	8	2	1	10	12	21	11	18	35	4	7	8	11	14	6	3858
6	Geoff Bodine	14	13	18	**33**	7	3	9	15	3*	24	8	34	1*	5	16	4	2	**32**	10	3	7	22	5	5	34	3	30	**6**	15	3799
7	Darrell Waltrip	11	4	24	3	24	23	14	5	37	1	23	28	6	8	**5**	5	**33***	20	17	7	4	8	17	1	2	12	31	13	5	3764
8	Davey Allison	2	29	9	40	3	29	8	6	**34**	**5**	5	32	5	35	38	3	39	16	1	4	9	**1***	4	18	19	11	27	3	2	3631
9	Phil Parsons	3	30	15	37	8	22	7	9	1	8	39	5	8	7	3	31	11	4	20	19	6	24	14	21	27	2	8	9	16	3630
10	Sterling Marlin	8	5	3	20	5	8	16	2	6	27	11	9	28	37	34	14	6	8	11	12	5	16	23	26	5	14	34	10	12	3621
11	Ricky Rudd	17	2	17	24	30	20	2	**18**	29	7	9	**3**	30	11	22	12	41	1	16	16	10	26	10	24*	8	7*	2	26*	4	3547
12	Bobby Hillin Jr.	13	8	21	6	17	15	18	3	13	14	17	24	15	12	13	21	17	13	37	10	30	14	21	14	6	13	23	7	9	3446
13	Kyle Petty	18	18	19	5	40	7	5	17	8	16	33	14	12	33	24	18	15	34	8	13	28	6	6	22	11	16	9	17	22	3296
14	Alan Kulwicki	32	21	4	39	2	19	15	20	22	3	**6**	38	**27**	21	40	8	19	19	36	**5**	15	5	31	2	**28**	29	28	1	25	3176
15	Mark Martin	41	25	12	31	6	2	29	23	12	37	9	7	4	14	17	7	7	28	32	27	19	4	**39**	9	9	19	28	36	20	3142
16	Neil Bonnett	4	1	1*	22	19	11	19	30	14	36	35	10	11	19	18			38	40	14	16	9	8	19	18	28	10	21	13	3040
17	Lake Speed	37	6	2	38	1*	30	26	28	15	21	4	26	23	29	9	32	13	37	5	20	12	36	9	28	34	15	24	15	37	2984
18	Michael Waltrip	22	31	13	12	21	12	32	22	33	23	36	11	2	28	21	17	20	33	7	31	25	12	12	25	23	25	19	28	7	2949
19	Dave Marcis	20	17	23	15	37	9	25	12	27	34	32	21	38	18	23	30	18	26	22	29	22	10	16	13	26	21	16	18	19	2854
20	Brett Bodine	35	27	27	9	15	17	13	27	19	4	31	40	35	27	42	20	28	23	6	25	17	11	22	10	3	17	29	43	27	2828
21	Rick Wilson	15	DNQ	36	10	27	**25**	28	25	35	18*	7	33	25	41	2	13	4	12	9	23	38	33	24	16	25	20	22	29	17	2762
22	Richard Petty	34	3	41	23	41	6	6	32	20	15	15	6	26	24	20	28	21	17	39	8	33	34	38	27	38	18	25	35	36	2644
23	Dale Jarrett	16	26	16	29	12	28	21	13	11	41	20	8	13	25	14	25	37	11	41	26	34	15	28	32	37	23	32	31	41	2622
24	Benny Parsons	31	14	33	13	34	13	17	14	24	25	22	13	31	38	35	35	27	39	15		13	20	27	20	12	QL	13	8	34	2559
25	Ken Bouchard **(R)**	DNQ	23	8	16	13	21	27	31	DNQ	11	14	DNQ	14	17	36	16	35	27	25	DNQ	18	19	25	17	33	27	18	23	DNQ	2378
26	Ernie Irvan **(R)**	DNQ	DNQ	25	18	22	26	24	DNQ	32	22	26	31	37	15	25	22	32	29	33	15	20	28	13	11	DNQ	26	15	22	18	2319
27	Harry Gant	29	28	28	21	38	18*	12	26	36	30						10	16	31	21	6	40	32	11	30	24	30	7	12	30	2266
28	Morgan Shepherd	42	**16**	7	30	39					26	2	42	16	34	7	**6**	40	7	4	DNQ	39	31	29	31	16	22	14		40	2193
29	Buddy Baker	9	15	11	7	10	31	31	7	16	29	13	19	7	13	6	23	10	QL												2056
30	Jimmy Means	25	24	40	42	35	32	30	DNQ	23	12	27	43	20	36	27	39	23	14	38	DNQ	24	29	19	23	42	24	39	24	38	2045
31	Derrike Cope	27	32	20	26	26	24	22	29	26	40	18	17	24	32	39	33	24	40	34	30	35	DNQ	36		32		36	16	33	1985
32	Mike Alexander														10	15	15	25	5	23	18	14	17	7	29	21	9	6	27	3	1931
33	Bobby Allison	1*	11	22	11	9	5	20	8	2	17	10	22	39																	1654
34	Eddie Bierschwale	28		32	17	14				39	28	40		29	26	31	38	31		24		26	27	26		40		33	40	24	1481
35	Rodney Combs	Wth			27	32	DNQ	23	DNQ	38	32	29	DNQ	34	30	33	36	29	24	14	11	21	21	40	DNQ	DNQ		40		29	1468
36	Brad Noffsinger **(R)**				14	36	DNQ	DNQ	21	25	33	24		19	20	DNQ	19	22	15	26	32	DNQ	DNQ	34	DNQ	DNQ	DNQ	37	25	26	1316
37	Greg Sacks	40			DNQ	31				17	10					10	34	38		42			13		12	29	10	12	38	28	1237
38	Cale Yarborough	38			32					18	38				9	41		9		18						22				10	940
39	Joe Ruttman										20	30	29	17	16	11	27	42	9							35		38	41	DNQ	803
40	Brad Teague	21	19	39	36	20	27	DNQ	19	21														30	15	15	DNQ	35		39	802
41	Jimmy Horton **(R)**	DNQ			DNQ	18				DNQ	31	34		18	DNQ	DNQ	29			DNQ		37		20				DNQ		32	647
42	A. J. Foyt	33			34					28						37		12								36				31	523
43	H. B. Bailey				41	16					35				39					28		27				DNQ				35	478
44	Jim Sauter	QL			25						39									19		23		32		13		17	32	23	463
45	Chad Little												23							27				15		DNQ			19		405
46	Buddy Arrington	DNQ			DNQ	28					DNQ	DNQ		21	23	28															352
47	Ken Ragan	DNQ			35					41						30		30				31				Wth					314
48	Dana Patten											28			22					30				33							313
49	Rick Jeffrey	30		26	DNQ			DNQ		30						29		DNQ						DNQ							307
50	Mickey Gibbs	DNQ	35		DNQ					40								34		31						39					283
51	Steve Moore	23		30	DNQ	33								DNQ																	231
52	Phil Barkdoll	36								31						DNQ		26													210
53	Hershel McGriff												36						25			DNQ							34		204
54	Rob Moroso																									14	31				191
55	Bobby Gerhart	DNQ												22			26							DNQ							182
56	Bill Schmitt												12																37		179
57	Jocko Maggiacomo	DNQ			DNQ								30	40					35							DNQ		DNQ			174
58	Roy Smith												27																30		160
59	Patty Moise															26			30												158
60	Ed Pimm	24	DNQ	34																											152
61	J. D. McDuffie	DNQ									DNQ	25		DNQ	DNQ		DNQ	DNQ	36	DNQ	DNQ		DNQ	DNQ	DNQ	DNQ	DNQ	DNQ			148
62	Larry Pearson										DNQ															41				21	140
63	Rick Hendrick												15																		118
64	Tommy Kendall												18																		114
65	Trevor Boys	19								DNQ																			20		
66	Lee Faulk																				DNQ		23		DNQ	20	32				103
67	Ben Hess																DNQ	Wth		DNQ			DNQ	DNQ		DNQ		20			103
68	Connie Saylor	39								DNQ					DNQ			Wth								DNQ		21			100
69	Ron Esau												DNQ				DNQ	36	21	DNQ			DNQ								100
70	Bob Schacht													36			40						30								98
71	Tom Rotsell																		22												97
72	Dave Mader III																				24				DNQ					DNQ	91
73	John Krebs												25																DNQ		88
74	Ralph Jones	26																													85
75	David Sosebee				28					Wth					31															DNQ	79
76	Jim Bown												41																42		77
77	Philip Duffie															DNQ		DNQ				29				DNQ		DNQ			76
78	Dave Pletcher	DNQ	DNQ	29	DNQ																										76
79	Larry Moyer	DNQ	DNQ													32		DNQ		DNQ											67
80	Gary Collins																												33		64
81	Donnie Allison	DNQ			DNQ					Wth	DNQ									35											58
82	Randy Baker																					36				DNQ					55
83	Rick McCray												37																		52
84	Mike Potter	DNQ					DNQ			Wth				DNQ			37	DNQ			DNQ	DNQ				DNQ					52
85	Jay Sommers							DNQ				37			DNQ								DNQ							DNQ	52
86	Mark Stahl	DNQ		37							DNQ																				52
87	Charlie Baker			38	DNQ						DNQ						DNQ											DNQ		DNQ	49
88	Joe Booher	DNQ										38																			49
89	Ruben Garcia												39																		46
90	Johnny Rutherford																									DNQ			39		46
91	Tommy Ellis																				DNQ					30				42	37
92	Butch Miller																				17		25								
93	Rick Mast																				28	32									
94	Lennie Pond		22																				DNQ								
95	Jimmy Hensley								24																						
96	Terry Petris												35																		
97	Randy LaJoie																							37		DNQ					
98	David Simko									Wth					40					DNQ											
99	Sarel van der Merwe	DNQ																													
100	Mike Porter	DNQ																													
101	Joey Sonntag	DNQ																													
102	Bobby Wawak	DNQ																													
103	John Linville	DNQ																													
104	Tony Spanos	DNQ		DNQ	Wth								DNQ				DNQ														
105	Ronnie Sanders	DNQ														DNQ		Wth													
106	Delma Cowart	DNQ								Wth						DNQ		DNQ													
107	Mark Gibson	DNQ														DNQ		DNQ								DNQ					
108	Blackie Wangerin	DNQ														Wth		DNQ													
109	Bobby Coyle	DNQ																												DNQ	
110	Glenn Moffat		DNQ					DNQ																							
111	Graham Taylor		DNQ																					DNQ							
112	D. Wayne Strout			DNQ																											
113	Billy Fulcher			DNQ									DNQ																		
114	Howard Mark			DNQ									DNQ																		
115	Jeff McDuffie							DNQ																							
116	Gary Brooks							DNQ	DNQ																	DNQ					
117	Doug French							DNQ																			DNQ				
118	Alan Russell							DNQ																			DNQ			DNQ	
119	Bill Meacham							DNQ																						DNQ	
120	Reno Fontana												DNQ																		
121	Marta Leonard												DNQ																		
122	George Follmer												DNQ																		
123	Ray Kelly												DNQ																		
124	Glen Steurer												DNQ																		
125	Sumner McKnight												DNQ																		
126	Bob Howard												DNQ																DNQ		
127	Butch Gilliland												DNQ																DNQ		
128	Jack Sellers												DNQ																DNQ		
129	St. James Davis												DNQ																DNQ		
130	Scott Gaylord												DNQ																DNQ		
131	J. C. Danielson												DNQ																DNQ		
132	Hut Stricklin															DNQ		DNQ													
134	Ricky Woodward															DNQ						DNQ									
135	Slick Johnson																	DNQ		DNQ		DNQ				DNQ					
136	Phil Good																		DNQ												
137	Mike Laws																			DNQ							DNQ			DNQ	
138	Lee Raymond																			DNQ								DNQ			
139	Randy Morrison																						DNQ								
140	Rayvon Clark																						DNQ	DNQ							
141	James Hylton																							DNQ							
142	Charlie Glotzbach																									DNQ					
143	Ronnie Silver																									DNQ					
144	John McFadden																									DNQ					
145	Troy Beebe																									DNQ					
146	Kevin Evans																										DNQ				
147	Harry Jefferson																												DNQ		
148	Don Hume																													DNQ	
149	Charlie Rudolph	Wth																													
150	Darin Brassfield	Wth																													
151	Earle Canavan																	Wth													
Pos	Driver	DAY	RCH	CAR	ATL	DAR	BRI	NWS	MAR	TAL	CLT	DOV	RIV	POC	MCH	DAY	POC	TAL	GLN	MCH	BRI	DAR	RCH	DOV	MAR	CLT	NWS	CAR	PHO	ATL	Pts

== Rookie of the Year ==
Ken Bouchard defeated Ernie Irvan by 59 points to win the Rookie of the Year title in 1988, driving for Bob Whitcomb. Bouchard raced only eight more times in the Cup series over his career, while Irvan won fifteen races over the next twelve years (his first victory was in 1990). The only other contenders were USAC driver Brad Noffsinger and Jimmy Horton, both of whom ran part-time schedules that season.

== See also ==
- 1988 NASCAR Busch Series
- 1988 NASCAR Busch Grand National North Series
- 1988 NASCAR Winston West Series
