= Jay Sommers (racing driver) =

American racing driver (born 1967)

- Born: October 15, 1967 (age 59); Mount Clemens, Michigan, U.S.

NASCAR Cup Series career
- 1 race run over 1 year
- Best finish: 83rd (1988)
- First race: 1988 Budweiser 500 (Dover)
Wins	Top tens	Poles
0	0	0

NASCAR O'Reilly Auto Parts Series career
- 1 race run over 1 year
- Best finish: 133rd (2003)
- First race: 2003 Food City 250 (Bristol)
Wins	Top tens	Poles
0	0	0

Jay Sommers (born October 15, 1967) is an American professional stock car racing driver. He competed in the ARCA Permatex SuperCar Series in the late 1980s. After winning the Michigan Lottery in 1988, he used his earnings to bankroll racing endeavors in NASCAR. Sommers eventually raced in the NASCAR Winston Cup Series and NASCAR Busch Series.

He last raced in the Champion Racing Association's JEGS All-Stars Tour.

== Racing career ==
In 1987, Sommers competed in the ARCA Permatex SuperCar Series race at Atlanta International Raceway, finishing 34th after crashing on lap 26.

A year later, at the age of twenty, Sommers won one-fifth of a $28.9 million jackpot in the Michigan Lottery, getting $5.8 million. As part of his winnings, Sommers received an annual payment of $290,000, which he used to purchase race cars and equipment from NASCAR team owner Hoss Ellington. He finished fourth in the season-opening ARCA race at Daytona International Speedway, followed by a 31st-place run at Atlanta due to mechanical problems. Rumors eventually surfaced of his death or critical injury, which he attributed to people envious of his lottery success.

In April 1988, he entered a self-owned No. 78 Chevrolet in the Winston Cup race at North Wilkesboro Speedway, but failed to qualify. Two months later, Sommers made his first Cup start at Dover Downs International Speedway, starting 36th after setting a qualifying time of 140.242 miles per hour (225.698 km/h). He retired from the race on lap 280 for overheating issues and finished 37th. Sommers also missed the races at Michigan International Speedway, Richmond Fairgrounds Raceway, and Atlanta.

In 1989, Sommers was encouraged by high school friend John Paganes to let him manage his lottery winnings for the next decade. As part of the deal, Paganes would send Sommers $57,000 each year. Though the money was set to run through 2008, Sommers ultimately lost it, prompting him to sue. Although he won the case on a $887,000 settlement, Sommers had to spend much of it to pay off debts. He eventually became a pizza delivery person and construction worker.

After a four-year retirement from stock car racing, Sommers attempted a return to the sport in 2000, driving late models in the Midwestern United States. In 2003, he competed in the NASCAR Busch Series race at Bristol Motor Speedway, driving the No. 0 for JD Motorsports. After qualifying 33rd, he was involved in a lap 197 crash with Johnny and Tim Sauter, resulting in a 28th-place finish.

In 2005, Sommers won a track championship in Ohio. With the support of car owners Barb and John Stajninger, Sommers later raced in the CRA/JEGS All-Stars Tour, driving the No. 98 car. In the series, he ran two races apiece in 2015 and 2016. Outside of racing, he works as a self-employed marine mechanic.

== Motorsports career results ==
=== NASCAR ===
(key) (Bold – Pole position awarded by qualifying time. Italics – Pole position earned by points standings or practice time. * – Most laps led.)

==== Winston Cup Series ====
NASCAR Winston Cup Series results
Year	Team	No.	Make	1	2	3	4	5	6	7	8	9	10	11	12	13	14	15	16	17	18	19	20	21	22	23	24	25	26	27	28	29	NWCC	Pts	Ref
1988	Jay Sommers	78	Chevy	DAY	RCH	CAR	ATL	DAR	BRI	NWS; DNQ	MAR	TAL	CLT	DOV; 37	RSD	POC	MCH; DNQ	DAY	POC	TAL	GLN	MCH	BRI	DAR	RCH; DNQ	DOV	MAR	CLT	NWS	CAR	PHO	ATL; DNQ	83rd	52	

==== Busch Series ====
NASCAR Busch Series results
Year	Team	No.	Make	1	2	3	4	5	6	7	8	9	10	11	12	13	14	15	16	17	18	19	20	21	22	23	24	25	26	27	28	29	30	31	32	33	34	NBSC	Pts	Ref
2003	Davis Motorsports	0	Chevy	DAY	CAR	LVS	DAR	BRI	TEX	TAL	NSH	CAL	RCH	GTY	NZH	CLT	DOV	NSH	KEN	MLW	DAY	CHI	NHA	PPR	IRP	MCH	BRI; 28	DAR	RCH	DOV	KAN	CLT	MEM	ATL	PHO	CAR	HOM	133rd	79	

=== ARCA Permatex SuperCar Series ===
(key) (Bold – Pole position awarded by qualifying time. Italics – Pole position earned by points standings or practice time. * – Most laps led.)

ARCA Permatex SuperCar Series results
Year	Team	No.	Make	1	2	3	4	5	6	7	8	9	10	11	12	13	14	15	16	17	18	19	APSSC	Pts	Ref
1987	Jay Sommers	78	Pontiac	DAY	ATL	TAL	DEL	ACS	TOL	ROC	POC	FRS	KIL	TAL	FRS	ISF	INF	DSF	SLM	ATL; 34			114th	-	
1988	Jay Sommers	78	Chevy	DAY; 4	ATL; 31	TAL; DNQ	FRS	PCS	ROC	POC	WIN	KIL	ACS	SLM	POC	TAL	DEL	FRS	ISF	DSF	SLM	ATL	82nd	-	
1989	Jay Sommers	78	Chevy	DAY; DNQ	ATL	KIL	TAL	FRS	POC	KIL	HAG	POC	TAL	DEL	FRS	ISF	TOL	DSF	SLM	ATL			NA	-	
