= 1988 The Budweiser at The Glen =

18th race of 1988 NASCAR Winston Cup Series

Race details
- Race 18 of 29 in the 1988 NASCAR Winston Cup Series
- The 1988 The Budweiser at The Glen program cover, featuring Alan Kulwicki.
- Date: August 14, 1988
- Official name: 3rd Annual The Budweiser at The Glen
- Location: Watkins Glen, New York, Watkins Glen International
- Course: Permanent racing facility
- Course length: 2.428 miles (3.907 km)
- Distance: 90 laps, 218.52 mi (351.673 km)
- Scheduled distance: 90 laps, 218.52 mi (351.673 km)
- Average speed: 74.096 miles per hour (119.246 km/h)
- Attendance: 100,000

Pole position
Driver	Geoff Bodine	Hendrick Motorsports
- Time: 1:12.537

Most laps led
Driver	Bill Elliott	Melling Racing
- Laps: 19

Winner
No. 26	Ricky Rudd	King Racing

Television in the United States
- Network: ESPN
- Announcers: Bob Jenkins, Ned Jarrett

Radio in the United States
- Radio: Motor Racing Network

The 1988 The Budweiser at The Glen was the 18th stock car race of the 1988 NASCAR Winston Cup Series season and the third iteration of the event. The race was held on Sunday, August 13, 1989, before an audience of 100,000 in Watkins Glen, New York, at the shortened layout of Watkins Glen International, a 2.428-mile (3.907 km) permanent road course layout. In the final laps of the race, King Racing driver Ricky Rudd would manage to fend off Blue Max Racing driver Rusty Wallace to the finish to take his ninth career NASCAR Winston Cup Series victory and his only victory of the season. To fill out the top three, the aforementioned Rusty Wallace and Melling Racing driver Bill Elliott would finish second and third, respectively.

== Background ==
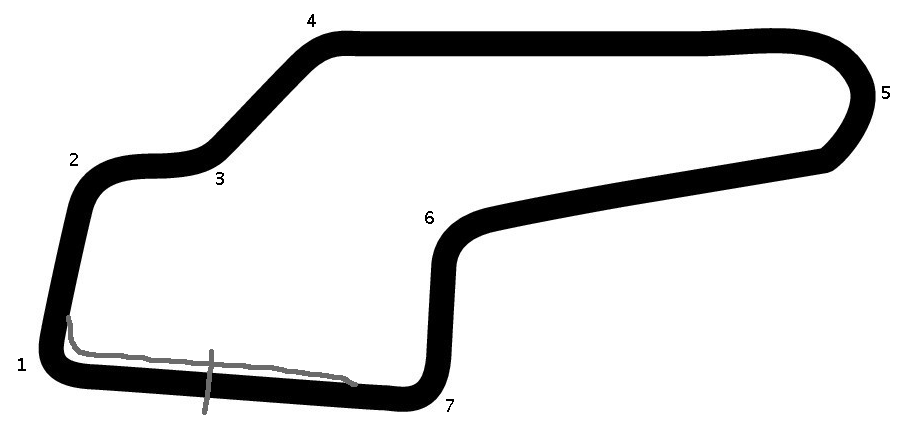
The layout of Watkins Glen International NASCAR used at the time.

Watkins Glen International (nicknamed "The Glen") is an automobile race track located in Watkins Glen, New York at the southern tip of Seneca Lake. It was long known around the world as the home of the Formula One United States Grand Prix, which it hosted for twenty consecutive years (1961–1980), but the site has been home to road racing of nearly every class, including the World Sportscar Championship, Trans-Am, Can-Am, NASCAR Sprint Cup Series, the International Motor Sports Association and the IndyCar Series.

Initially, public roads in the village were used for the race course. In 1956 a permanent circuit for the race was built. In 1968 the race was extended to six hours, becoming the 6 Hours of Watkins Glen. The circuit's current layout has more or less been the same since 1971, although a chicane was installed at the uphill Esses in 1975 to slow cars through these corners, where there was a fatality during practice at the 1973 United States Grand Prix. The chicane was removed in 1985, but another chicane called the "Inner Loop" was installed in 1992 after J. D. McDuffie's fatal accident during the previous year's NASCAR Winston Cup event.

The circuit is known as the Mecca of North American road racing and is a very popular venue among fans and drivers. The facility is currently owned by NASCAR.

=== Entry list ===
- (R) denotes rookie driver.

#	Driver	Team	Make
2	Ernie Irvan (R)	U.S. Racing	Chevrolet
3	Dale Earnhardt	Richard Childress Racing	Chevrolet
4	Rick Wilson	Morgan–McClure Motorsports	Oldsmobile
04	Hershel McGriff	McGriff Racing	Pontiac
5	Geoff Bodine	Hendrick Motorsports	Chevrolet
6	Mark Martin	Roush Racing	Ford
7	Alan Kulwicki	AK Racing	Ford
8	Bobby Hillin Jr.	Stavola Brothers Racing	Buick
9	Bill Elliott	Melling Racing	Ford
10	Ken Bouchard (R)	Whitcomb Racing	Ford
11	Terry Labonte	Junior Johnson & Associates	Chevrolet
12	Mike Alexander	Stavola Brothers Racing	Buick
15	Brett Bodine	Bud Moore Engineering	Ford
16	Tom Rotsell	Chilson Racing	Ford
17	Darrell Waltrip	Hendrick Motorsports	Chevrolet
21	Kyle Petty	Wood Brothers Racing	Ford
25	Ken Schrader	Hendrick Motorsports	Chevrolet
26	Ricky Rudd	King Racing	Buick
27	Rusty Wallace	Blue Max Racing	Pontiac
28	Davey Allison	Ranier-Lundy Racing	Ford
29	Dale Jarrett	Cale Yarborough Motorsports	Oldsmobile
30	Michael Waltrip	Bahari Racing	Pontiac
31	Joe Ruttman	Bob Clark Motorsports	Oldsmobile
33	Harry Gant	Mach 1 Racing	Chevrolet
37	Patty Moise	Randy Hope Motorsports	Buick
43	Richard Petty	Petty Enterprises	Pontiac
44	Sterling Marlin	Hagan Racing	Oldsmobile
52	Jimmy Means	Jimmy Means Racing	Pontiac
55	Phil Parsons	Jackson Bros. Motorsports	Oldsmobile
63	Jocko Maggiacomo	Linro Motorsports	Chevrolet
67	Ron Esau	Arrington Racing	Ford
68	Derrike Cope	Testa Racing	Ford
70	J. D. McDuffie	McDuffie Racing	Pontiac
71	Dave Marcis	Marcis Auto Racing	Chevrolet
75	Neil Bonnett	RahMoc Enterprises	Pontiac
76	Phil Good	Good Racing	Ford
83	Lake Speed	Speed Racing	Oldsmobile
88	Morgan Shepherd	Baker-Schiff Racing	Oldsmobile
90	Benny Parsons	Donlavey Racing	Ford
97	Rodney Combs	Winkle Motorsports	Buick
98	Brad Noffsinger (R)	Curb Racing	Buick

== Qualifying ==
Qualifying was split into two rounds. The first round was held on Friday, August 12, at 1:00 PM EST. Each driver would have one lap to set a time. During the first round, the top 20 drivers in the round would be guaranteed a starting spot in the race. If a driver was not able to guarantee a spot in the first round, they had the option to scrub their time from the first round and try and run a faster lap time in a second round qualifying run, held on Saturday, August 13, at 11:00 AM EST. As with the first round, each driver would have one lap to set a time. For this specific race, positions 21-40 would be decided on time, and depending on who needed it, a select amount of positions were given to cars who had not otherwise qualified on time but were high enough in owner's points; up to two provisionals were given.

Geoff Bodine, driving for Hendrick Motorsports, would win the pole, setting a time of 1:12.537 and an average speed of 120.501 miles per hour (193.928 km/h) in the first round.

Phil Good was the only driver to fail to qualify.

=== Full qualifying results ===
Pos.	#	Driver	Team	Make	Time	Speed
1	5	Geoff Bodine	Hendrick Motorsports	Chevrolet	1:12.537	120.501
2	27	Rusty Wallace	Blue Max Racing	Pontiac	1:12.579	120.432
3	9	Bill Elliott	Melling Racing	Ford	1:12.629	120.349
4	11	Terry Labonte	Junior Johnson & Associates	Chevrolet	1:12.985	119.762
5	26	Ricky Rudd	King Racing	Buick	1:13.377	119.122
6	33	Harry Gant	Mach 1 Racing	Chevrolet	1:13.400	119.084
7	88	Morgan Shepherd	Baker–Schiff Racing	Oldsmobile	1:13.451	119.002
8	25	Ken Schrader	Hendrick Motorsports	Chevrolet	1:13.488	118.942
9	17	Darrell Waltrip	Hendrick Motorsports	Chevrolet	1:13.509	118.908
10	55	Phil Parsons	Jackson Bros. Motorsports	Oldsmobile	1:13.838	118.378
11	21	Kyle Petty	Wood Brothers Racing	Ford	1:13.941	118.213
12	43	Richard Petty	Petty Enterprises	Pontiac	1:13.994	118.128
13	30	Michael Waltrip	Bahari Racing	Pontiac	1:14.000	118.119
14	44	Sterling Marlin	Hagan Racing	Oldsmobile	1:14.006	118.109
15	6	Mark Martin	Roush Racing	Ford	1:14.019	118.089
16	15	Brett Bodine	Bud Moore Engineering	Ford	1:14.031	118.069
17	4	Rick Wilson	Morgan–McClure Motorsports	Oldsmobile	1:14.088	117.979
18	29	Dale Jarrett	Cale Yarborough Motorsports	Oldsmobile	1:14.300	117.642
19	3	Dale Earnhardt	Richard Childress Racing	Chevrolet	1:14.307	117.631
20	71	Dave Marcis	Marcis Auto Racing	Chevrolet	1:14.365	117.539
Failed to lock in Round 1
21	31	Joe Ruttman	Bob Clark Motorsports	Oldsmobile	1:14.491	117.340
22	7	Alan Kulwicki	AK Racing	Ford	1:14.603	117.164
23	8	Bobby Hillin Jr.	Stavola Brothers Racing	Buick	1:14.717	116.985
24	83	Lake Speed	Speed Racing	Oldsmobile	1:14.725	116.973
25	68	Derrike Cope	Testa Racing	Ford	1:15.238	116.175
26	90	Benny Parsons	Donlavey Racing	Ford	1:15.311	116.063
27	97	Rodney Combs	Winkle Motorsports	Buick	1:15.386	115.947
28	28	Davey Allison	Ranier-Lundy Racing	Ford	1:15.390	115.941
29	12	Mike Alexander	Stavola Brothers Racing	Buick	1:15.447	115.854
30	52	Jimmy Means	Jimmy Means Racing	Pontiac	1:15.494	115.781
31	63	Jocko Maggiacomo	Linro Motorsports	Chevrolet	1:15.554	115.639
32	2	Ernie Irvan (R)	U.S. Racing	Pontiac	1:15.719	115.437
33	10	Ken Bouchard (R)	Whitcomb Racing	Ford	1:16.279	114.590
34	37	Patty Moise	Randy Hope Motorsports	Buick	1:16.078	114.893
35	70	J. D. McDuffie	McDuffie Racing	Pontiac	1:16.586	114.131
36	67	Ron Esau	Arrington Racing	Oldsmobile	1:16.610	114.095
37	98	Brad Noffsinger (R)	Curb Racing	Buick	1:16.628	114.068
38	04	Hershel McGriff	McGriff Racing	Pontiac	1:17.131	113.321
39	16	Tom Rotsell	Chilson Racing	Ford	1:17.365	112.981
To the rear
40	75	Neil Bonnett	RahMoc Enterprises	Pontiac	1:13.008	119.724
Failed to qualify
41	76	Phil Good	Good Racing	Ford	1:17.426	112.892
Official first round qualifying results
Official starting lineup

== Race results ==
Fin	St	#	Driver	Team	Make	Laps	Led	Status	Pts	Winnings
1	5	26	Ricky Rudd	King Racing	Buick	90	4	running	180	$49,625
2	2	27	Rusty Wallace	Blue Max Racing	Pontiac	90	7	running	175	$33,900
3	3	9	Bill Elliott	Melling Racing	Ford	90	19	running	175	$26,640
4	10	55	Phil Parsons	Jackson Bros. Motorsports	Oldsmobile	90	6	running	165	$16,540
5	29	12	Mike Alexander	Stavola Brothers Racing	Buick	90	0	running	155	$19,295
6	19	3	Dale Earnhardt	Richard Childress Racing	Chevrolet	90	0	running	150	$18,530
7	7	88	Morgan Shepherd	Baker–Schiff Racing	Oldsmobile	90	0	running	0	$12,620
8	14	44	Sterling Marlin	Hagan Racing	Oldsmobile	90	0	running	142	$9,705
9	21	31	Joe Ruttman	Bob Clark Motorsports	Oldsmobile	90	0	running	138	$7,140
10	8	25	Ken Schrader	Hendrick Motorsports	Chevrolet	90	5	running	139	$12,835
11	18	29	Dale Jarrett	Cale Yarborough Motorsports	Oldsmobile	90	0	running	130	$6,180
12	17	4	Rick Wilson	Morgan–McClure Motorsports	Oldsmobile	90	0	running	127	$5,845
13	23	8	Bobby Hillin Jr.	Stavola Brothers Racing	Buick	90	0	running	124	$7,915
14	30	52	Jimmy Means	Jimmy Means Racing	Pontiac	90	0	running	121	$6,880
15	37	98	Brad Noffsinger (R)	Curb Racing	Buick	90	0	running	118	$4,705
16	28	28	Davey Allison	Ranier-Lundy Racing	Ford	90	0	running	115	$12,615
17	12	43	Richard Petty	Petty Enterprises	Pontiac	90	0	running	112	$6,200
18	4	11	Terry Labonte	Junior Johnson & Associates	Chevrolet	90	12	running	114	$9,990
19	22	7	Alan Kulwicki	AK Racing	Ford	90	0	running	106	$5,825
20	9	17	Darrell Waltrip	Hendrick Motorsports	Chevrolet	90	13	running	108	$11,865
21	36	67	Ron Esau	Arrington Racing	Oldsmobile	90	0	running	100	$4,580
22	39	16	Tom Rotsell	Chilson Racing	Ford	90	0	running	97	$2,470
23	16	15	Brett Bodine	Bud Moore Engineering	Ford	89	0	running	94	$10,960
24	27	97	Rodney Combs	Winkle Motorsports	Buick	89	0	running	91	$2,300
25	38	04	Hershel McGriff	McGriff Racing	Pontiac	88	0	running	88	$2,340
26	20	71	Dave Marcis	Marcis Auto Racing	Chevrolet	88	0	running	85	$5,135
27	33	10	Ken Bouchard (R)	Whitcomb Racing	Ford	87	0	running	82	$2,380
28	15	6	Mark Martin	Roush Racing	Ford	86	0	running	79	$2,925
29	32	2	Ernie Irvan (R)	U.S. Racing	Pontiac	86	0	running	76	$2,020
30	34	37	Patty Moise	Randy Hope Motorsports	Buick	85	0	running	73	$1,965
31	6	33	Harry Gant	Mach 1 Racing	Chevrolet	77	9	transmission	75	$4,660
32	1	5	Geoff Bodine	Hendrick Motorsports	Chevrolet	73	10	running	72	$8,525
33	13	30	Michael Waltrip	Bahari Racing	Pontiac	71	5	running	69	$4,440
34	11	21	Kyle Petty	Wood Brothers Racing	Ford	68	0	accident	61	$8,710
35	31	63	Jocko Maggiacomo	Linro Motorsports	Chevrolet	41	0	engine	58	$1,655
36	35	70	J. D. McDuffie	McDuffie Racing	Pontiac	40	0	engine	55	$1,600
37	24	83	Lake Speed	Speed Racing	Oldsmobile	30	0	engine	52	$2,220
38	40	75	Neil Bonnett	RahMoc Enterprises	Pontiac	21	0	overheating	49	$8,540
39	26	90	Benny Parsons	Donlavey Racing	Ford	11	0	engine	46	$4,140
40	25	68	Derrike Cope	Testa Racing	Ford	2	0	engine	43	$4,045
Official race results

== Standings after the race ==
Drivers' Championship standings

	Pos	Driver	Points
	1	Rusty Wallace	2,693
	2	Bill Elliott	2,682 (–11)
	3	Dale Earnhardt	2,635 (–58)
	4	Ken Schrader	2,470 (–223)
	5	Terry Labonte	2,423 (–270)
	6	Geoff Bodine	2,336 (–357)
1	7	Phil Parsons	2,302 (–391)
1	8	Sterling Marlin	2,287 (–406)
	9	Darrell Waltrip	2,236 (–457)
	10	Bobby Hillin Jr.	2,183 (–510)
Official driver's standings

- Note: Only the first 10 positions are included for the driver standings.

Previous race: 1988 Talladega DieHard 500	NASCAR Winston Cup Series; 1988 season	Next race: 1988 Champion Spark Plug 400
