= Larry Moyer =

American racing driver

- Born: Larry E. Moyer; April 10, 1951; Fort Wayne, Indiana, U.S.
- Died: August 2, 2011 (aged 60)
- Achievements: 1981 ARCA Racing Series champion

NASCAR Cup Series career
- 1 race run over 1 year
- Best finish: 79th (1988)
- First race: 1988 Pepsi Firecracker 400 (Daytona)
Wins	Top tens	Poles
0	0	0

ARCA Menards Series career
- 14 races run over 2 years
- Best finish: 1st (1981)
- First race: 1981 Daytona ARCA 200 (Daytona)
- Last race: 1982 Milwaukee Sentinel 200 (Milwaukee)
- First win: 1981 Dayton ARCA 100 (Dayton)
Wins	Top tens	Poles
1	8	1
- Statistics up to date as of February 28, 2025.

Larry E. Moyer (born April 10, 1951 – August 2, 2011) was an American professional stock car racing driver who has previously competed in the ARCA Racing Series from 1981 to 1982, where he won the championship in his first year in the series. He also made one NASCAR Winston Cup Series start in 1988, finishing 32nd at Daytona International Speedway. He is the father of fellow racing A. J. Moyer, who currently competes part-time in ARCA competition.

Moyer died at the age of sixty on August 2, 2011.

Moyer also competed in series such as the USAC Stock Car Series, the United Speed Alliance Racing Late Model Series, the ASA National Late Model Sportsman Series, and the Florida Pro Truck Series.

== Motorsports career results ==
=== NASCAR ===
(key) (Bold - Pole position awarded by qualifying time. Italics - Pole position earned by points standings or practice time. * – Most laps led.)

==== Winston Cup Series ====
NASCAR Winston Cup Series results
Year	Team	No.	Make	1	2	3	4	5	6	7	8	9	10	11	12	13	14	15	16	17	18	19	20	21	22	23	24	25	26	27	28	29	NWCC	Pts	Ref
1988	John Stark	07	Pontiac	DAY; DNQ	RCH; DNQ	CAR	ATL	DAR	BRI	NWS	MAR	TAL	CLT	DOV	RSD	POC	MCH	DAY; 32	POC	TAL; DNQ	GLN	MCH; DNQ	BRI	DAR	RCH	DOV	MAR	CLT	NWS	CAR	PHO	ATL	79th	67	

===== Daytona 500 =====
Year	Team	Manufacturer	Start	Finish
1988	John Stark	Pontiac	DNQ	

=== ARCA Talladega SuperCar Series ===
(key) (Bold – Pole position awarded by qualifying time. Italics – Pole position earned by points standings or practice time. * – Most laps led. ** – All laps led.)

ARCA Talladega SuperCar Series results
Year	Team	No.	Make	1	2	3	4	5	6	7	8	9	10	11	12	13	ATSSC	Pts	Ref
1981	Larry Moyer	11	Pontiac	DAY; 11	DSP; 1	FRS; 9	FRS; 3	BFS; 11	TAL; 9		COR; 2						1st	950	
1981	Larry Moyer	11	Chevy							FRS; 9							1st	950	
1982	Larry Moyer	11	Chevy	NSV; 3	DAY; DNQ												15th	485	
1982	Larry Moyer	2	Pontiac		DAY; 17												15th	485	
1982	Larry Moyer	2	Chevy			TAL; 24	FRS	CMS	WIN; 22	NSV	TAT; DNQ	TAL	FRS	**BFS**; 2*	MIL; 15	SND	15th	485	

Sporting positions
Preceded by Bob Dotter	ARCA Series Champion; 1981	Succeeded by Scott Stovall
