= 1990 Motorcraft Quality Parts 500 =

Fourth race of the 1990 NASCAR Winston Cup Series

Race details
- Race 4 of 29 in the 1990 NASCAR Winston Cup Series
- The 1990 Motorcraft Quality Parts 500 program cover, featuring Morgan Shepherd.
- Date: March 18, 1990
- Official name: 31st Annual Motorcraft Quality Parts 500
- Location: Hampton, Georgia, Atlanta International Raceway
- Course: Permanent racing facility
- Course length: 1.522 miles (2.449 km)
- Distance: 328 laps, 499.216 mi (803.41 km)
- Scheduled distance: 328 laps, 499.216 mi (803.41 km)
- Average speed: 156.849 miles per hour (252.424 km/h)
- Attendance: 45,000

Pole position
Driver	Dale Earnhardt	Richard Childress Racing
- Time: Set by 1990 owner's points

Most laps led
Driver	Dale Earnhardt	Richard Childress Racing
- Laps: 216

Winner
No. 3	Dale Earnhardt	Richard Childress Racing

Television in the United States
- Network: ABC
- Announcers: Paul Page, Benny Parsons, Bobby Unser

Radio in the United States
- Radio: Motor Racing Network

The 1990 Motorcraft Quality Parts 500 was the fourth stock car race of the 1990 NASCAR Winston Cup Series season and the 31st iteration of the event. The race was held on Sunday, March 18, 1990, before an audience of 45,000 in Hampton, Georgia, at Atlanta International Raceway, a 1.522 miles (2.449 km) permanent asphalt quad-oval intermediate speedway. The race took the scheduled 328 laps to complete. On the final restart with two laps in the race, Richard Childress Racing driver Dale Earnhardt would manage to make a late-race charge to the lead, coming back from a poor final pit stop to take his 40th career NASCAR Winston Cup Series victory and his first victory of the season. To fill out the top three, Bud Moore Engineering driver Morgan Shepherd and Morgan–McClure Motorsports driver Ernie Irvan would finish second and third, respectively.

== Background ==
The layout of Atlanta Motor Raceway, the circuit where the race was held.

Atlanta Motor Speedway (formerly Atlanta International Raceway) is a 1.522-mile race track in Hampton, Georgia, United States, 20 miles (32 km) south of Atlanta. It has annually hosted NASCAR Winston Cup Series stock car races since its inauguration in 1960.

The venue was bought by Speedway Motorsports in 1990. In 1994, 46 condominiums were built over the northeastern side of the track. In 1997, to standardize the track with Speedway Motorsports' other two intermediate ovals, the entire track was almost completely rebuilt. The frontstretch and backstretch were swapped, and the configuration of the track was changed from oval to quad-oval, with a new official length of 1.54-mile (2.48 km) where before it was 1.522-mile (2.449 km). The project made the track one of the fastest on the NASCAR circuit.

=== Entry list ===
- (R) - denotes rookie driver.

#	Driver	Team	Make
1	Terry Labonte	Precision Products Racing	Oldsmobile
01	Mickey Gibbs	Gibbs Racing	Ford
2	Rick Mast	U.S. Racing	Pontiac
3	Dale Earnhardt	Richard Childress Racing	Chevrolet
4	Ernie Irvan	Morgan–McClure Motorsports	Oldsmobile
5	Ricky Rudd	Hendrick Motorsports	Chevrolet
6	Mark Martin	Roush Racing	Ford
7	Alan Kulwicki	AK Racing	Ford
8	Bobby Hillin Jr.	Stavola Brothers Racing	Buick
9	Bill Elliott	Melling Racing	Ford
10	Derrike Cope	Whitcomb Racing	Chevrolet
11	Geoff Bodine	Junior Johnson & Associates	Ford
12	Mike Alexander	Bobby Allison Motorsports	Buick
14	A. J. Foyt	A. J. Foyt Racing	Oldsmobile
15	Morgan Shepherd	Bud Moore Engineering	Ford
16	Larry Pearson	Pearson Racing	Buick
17	Darrell Waltrip	Hendrick Motorsports	Chevrolet
18	Hut Stricklin	TriStar Motorsports	Pontiac
19	Chad Little	Little Racing	Ford
20	Rob Moroso (R)	Moroso Racing	Oldsmobile
21	Neil Bonnett	Wood Brothers Racing	Ford
25	Ken Schrader	Hendrick Motorsports	Chevrolet
26	Brett Bodine	King Racing	Buick
27	Rusty Wallace	Blue Max Racing	Pontiac
28	Davey Allison	Robert Yates Racing	Ford
30	Michael Waltrip	Bahari Racing	Pontiac
33	Harry Gant	Leo Jackson Motorsports	Oldsmobile
36	H. B. Bailey	Bailey Racing	Pontiac
42	Kyle Petty	SABCO Racing	Pontiac
43	Richard Petty	Petty Enterprises	Pontiac
46	Greg Sacks	Hendrick Motorsports	Chevrolet
47	Jack Pennington (R)	Close Racing	Oldsmobile
52	Jimmy Means	Jimmy Means Racing	Pontiac
57	Jimmy Spencer	Osterlund Racing	Pontiac
66	Dick Trickle	Cale Yarborough Motorsports	Pontiac
70	J. D. McDuffie	McDuffie Racing	Pontiac
71	Dave Marcis	Marcis Auto Racing	Chevrolet
75	Rick Wilson	RahMoc Enterprises	Oldsmobile
77	Ken Ragan	Ragan Racing	Ford
82	Mark Stahl	Stahl Racing	Ford
90	Buddy Baker	Donlavey Racing	Ford
94	Sterling Marlin	Hagan Racing	Oldsmobile
98	Butch Miller	Travis Carter Enterprises	Chevrolet

== Qualifying ==
Two rounds of qualifying were scheduled to be held on Friday, March 16, and Saturday, March 17. However, Friday's sessions were cancelled due to rain, with both rounds then scheduled to commence on Saturday. However, Saturday's sessions would also be cancelled due to rain, leaving qualifying to be determined by a system of owner's points and postmarks on entry list blanks. The top 30 positions would be determined by the current 1990 owner's points, while the final nine spots would be determined by a system of provisionals that included past winners, and finally postmarks. As a result, Richard Childress Racing driver Dale Earnhardt would win the pole.

Three drivers would fail to qualify.

=== Full qualifying results ===
Pos.	#	Driver	Team	Make
1	3	Dale Earnhardt	Richard Childress Racing	Chevrolet
2	27	Rusty Wallace	Blue Max Racing	Pontiac
3	15	Morgan Shepherd	Bud Moore Engineering	Ford
4	5	Ricky Rudd	Hendrick Motorsports	Chevrolet
5	42	Kyle Petty	SABCO Racing	Pontiac
6	57	Jimmy Spencer	Osterlund Racing	Pontiac
7	9	Bill Elliott	Melling Racing	Ford
8	17	Darrell Waltrip	Hendrick Motorsports	Chevrolet
9	94	Sterling Marlin	Hagan Racing	Oldsmobile
10	11	Geoff Bodine	Junior Johnson & Associates	Ford
11	66	Dick Trickle	Cale Yarborough Motorsports	Pontiac
12	1	Terry Labonte	Precision Products Racing	Oldsmobile
13	10	Derrike Cope	Whitcomb Racing	Chevrolet
14	25	Ken Schrader	Hendrick Motorsports	Chevrolet
15	26	Brett Bodine	King Racing	Buick
16	8	Bobby Hillin Jr.	Stavola Brothers Racing	Buick
17	6	Mark Martin	Roush Racing	Ford
18	98	Butch Miller	Travis Carter Enterprises	Chevrolet
19	30	Michael Waltrip	Bahari Racing	Pontiac
20	71	Dave Marcis	Marcis Auto Racing	Chevrolet
21	33	Harry Gant	Leo Jackson Motorsports	Oldsmobile
22	90	Buddy Baker	Donlavey Racing	Ford
23	52	Jimmy Means	Jimmy Means Racing	Pontiac
24	16	Larry Pearson	Pearson Racing	Buick
25	12	Mike Alexander	Bobby Allison Motorsports	Buick
26	2	Rick Mast	U.S. Racing	Pontiac
27	21	Neil Bonnett	Wood Brothers Racing	Ford
28	28	Davey Allison	Robert Yates Racing	Ford
29	75	Rick Wilson	Hendrick Motorsports	Oldsmobile
30	4	Ernie Irvan	Morgan–McClure Motorsports	Oldsmobile
Provisionals
31	7	Alan Kulwicki	AK Racing	Ford
32	43	Richard Petty	Petty Enterprises	Pontiac
33	77	Ken Ragan	Ragan Racing	Ford
34	19	Chad Little	Little Racing	Ford
35	36	H. B. Bailey	Bailey Racing	Pontiac
36	20	Rob Moroso (R)	Moroso Racing	Oldsmobile
37	01	Mickey Gibbs	Gibbs Racing	Ford
38	18	Hut Stricklin	TriStar Motorsports	Pontiac
39	82	Mark Stahl	Stahl Racing	Ford
40	47	Jack Pennington (R)	Close Racing	Oldsmobile
Failed to qualify
41	46	Greg Sacks	Hendrick Motorsports	Chevrolet
42	14	A. J. Foyt	A. J. Foyt Racing	Oldsmobile
43	70	J. D. McDuffie	McDuffie Racing	Pontiac
Official starting lineup

== Race results ==
Fin	St	#	Driver	Team	Make	Laps	Led	Status	Pts	Winnings
1	1	3	Dale Earnhardt	Richard Childress Racing	Chevrolet	328	216	running	185	$85,000
2	3	15	Morgan Shepherd	Bud Moore Engineering	Ford	328	14	running	175	$36,000
3	30	4	Ernie Irvan	Morgan–McClure Motorsports	Oldsmobile	328	1	running	170	$31,957
4	14	25	Ken Schrader	Hendrick Motorsports	Chevrolet	328	10	running	165	$22,900
5	17	6	Mark Martin	Roush Racing	Ford	328	0	running	155	$20,850
6	5	42	Kyle Petty	SABCO Racing	Pontiac	328	3	running	155	$15,075
7	10	11	Geoff Bodine	Junior Johnson & Associates	Ford	328	80	running	151	$19,250
8	31	7	Alan Kulwicki	AK Racing	Ford	327	0	running	142	$11,625
9	21	33	Harry Gant	Leo Jackson Motorsports	Oldsmobile	327	0	running	138	$13,600
10	9	94	Sterling Marlin	Hagan Racing	Oldsmobile	326	2	running	139	$12,300
11	15	26	Brett Bodine	King Racing	Buick	326	0	running	130	$9,495
12	7	9	Bill Elliott	Melling Racing	Ford	326	0	running	127	$13,875
13	28	28	Davey Allison	Robert Yates Racing	Ford	326	0	running	124	$12,155
14	11	66	Dick Trickle	Cale Yarborough Motorsports	Pontiac	326	0	running	121	$9,935
15	6	57	Jimmy Spencer	Osterlund Racing	Pontiac	325	0	running	118	$8,680
16	16	8	Bobby Hillin Jr.	Stavola Brothers Racing	Buick	325	0	running	115	$8,545
17	29	75	Rick Wilson	Hendrick Motorsports	Oldsmobile	324	0	running	112	$8,235
18	27	21	Neil Bonnett	Wood Brothers Racing	Ford	322	0	running	109	$7,625
19	34	19	Chad Little	Little Racing	Ford	322	0	running	106	$4,415
20	18	98	Butch Miller	Travis Carter Enterprises	Chevrolet	321	0	running	103	$4,970
21	22	90	Buddy Baker	Donlavey Racing	Ford	319	0	running	0	$4,135
22	20	71	Dave Marcis	Marcis Auto Racing	Chevrolet	317	0	running	97	$7,050
23	25	12	Mike Alexander	Bobby Allison Motorsports	Buick	317	0	running	94	$3,965
24	2	27	Rusty Wallace	Blue Max Racing	Pontiac	316	1	engine	96	$14,930
25	32	43	Richard Petty	Petty Enterprises	Pontiac	315	0	running	88	$4,845
26	8	17	Darrell Waltrip	Hendrick Motorsports	Chevrolet	312	1	running	90	$12,755
27	4	5	Ricky Rudd	Hendrick Motorsports	Chevrolet	307	0	running	82	$6,545
28	39	82	Mark Stahl	Stahl Racing	Ford	300	0	running	79	$3,660
29	13	10	Derrike Cope	Whitcomb Racing	Chevrolet	255	0	engine	76	$8,625
30	40	47	Jack Pennington (R)	Close Racing	Oldsmobile	253	0	engine	73	$4,290
31	23	52	Jimmy Means	Jimmy Means Racing	Pontiac	251	0	engine	70	$4,230
32	35	36	H. B. Bailey	Bailey Racing	Pontiac	214	0	engine	67	$3,480
33	36	20	Rob Moroso (R)	Moroso Racing	Oldsmobile	149	0	engine	64	$3,670
34	24	16	Larry Pearson	Pearson Racing	Buick	135	0	engine	61	$6,095
35	26	2	Rick Mast	U.S. Racing	Pontiac	113	0	engine	58	$6,050
36	33	77	Ken Ragan	Ragan Racing	Ford	101	0	valve	55	$3,350
37	38	18	Hut Stricklin	TriStar Motorsports	Pontiac	84	0	valve	52	$3,330
38	19	30	Michael Waltrip	Bahari Racing	Pontiac	53	0	timing chain	49	$5,960
39	37	01	Mickey Gibbs	Gibbs Racing	Ford	40	0	valve	46	$3,285
40	12	1	Terry Labonte	Precision Products Racing	Oldsmobile	4	0	engine	43	$6,580
Official race results

== Standings after the race ==
Drivers' Championship standings

	Pos	Driver	Points
	1	Dale Earnhardt	659
1	2	Morgan Shepherd	601 (-58)
1	3	Rusty Wallace	562 (-97)
1	4	Kyle Petty	561 (–98)
5	5	Geoff Bodine	538 (–121)
3	6	Sterling Marlin	534 (–125)
	7	Bill Elliott	526 (–133)
2	8	Jimmy Spencer	521 (–138)
5	9	Ken Schrader	507 (–152)
1	10	Dick Trickle	507 (–152)
Official driver's standings

- Note: Only the first 10 positions are included for the driver standings.

Previous race: 1990 GM Goodwrench 500	NASCAR Winston Cup Series; 1990 season	Next race: 1990 TranSouth 500
