= 1990 TranSouth 500 =

Fifth race of the 1990 NASCAR Winston Cup Series

Race details
- Race 5 of 29 in the 1990 NASCAR Winston Cup Series
- The 1990 TranSouth 500 program cover, featuring Harry Gant.
- Date: April 1, 1990
- Official name: 34th Annual TranSouth 500
- Location: Darlington, South Carolina, Darlington Raceway
- Course: Permanent racing facility
- Course length: 1.366 miles (2.198 km)
- Distance: 367 laps, 501.322 mi (806.799 km)
- Scheduled distance: 367 laps, 501.322 mi (806.799 km)
- Average speed: 124.073 miles per hour (199.676 km/h)
- Attendance: 55,000

Pole position
Driver	Geoff Bodine	Junior Johnson & Associates
- Time: 30.170

Most laps led
Driver	Geoff Bodine	Junior Johnson & Associates
- Laps: 154

Winner
No. 3	Dale Earnhardt	Richard Childress Racing

Television in the United States
- Network: ESPN
- Announcers: Bob Jenkins, Ned Jarrett, Benny Parsons

Radio in the United States
- Radio: Motor Racing Network

The 1990 TranSouth 500 was the fifth stock car race of the 1990 NASCAR Winston Cup Series season and the 34th iteration of the event. The race was held on Sunday, April 1, 1990, before an audience of 55,000 in Darlington, South Carolina, at Darlington Raceway, a 1.366 miles (2.198 km) permanent egg-shaped oval racetrack. The race took the scheduled 367 laps to complete. On the final restart with three laps to go in the race, Richard Childress Racing driver Dale Earnhardt would manage to fend off the field to take his 41st career NASCAR Winston Cup Series victory and his second victory of the season. To fill out the top three, Roush Racing driver Mark Martin and Robert Yates Racing driver Davey Allison would finish second and third, respectively.

On lap 212 of the race, a 13-car pileup would occur on the track's front-stretch. One of the 13 drivers involved, Neil Bonnett, would suffer brain injuries that would lead towards amnesia and dizziness that would ultimately lead to the effective end of his racing career, only racing in two more races in 1993 before dying in a practice session accident in 1994.

== Background ==
The layout of Darlington Raceway, the venue where the race was held.

Darlington Raceway is a race track built for NASCAR racing located near Darlington, South Carolina. It is nicknamed "The Lady in Black" and "The Track Too Tough to Tame" by many NASCAR fans and drivers and advertised as "A NASCAR Tradition." It is of a unique, somewhat egg-shaped design, an oval with the ends of very different configurations, a condition which supposedly arose from the proximity of one end of the track to a minnow pond the owner refused to relocate. This situation makes it very challenging for the crews to set up their cars' handling in a way that is effective at both ends.

=== Entry list ===
- (R) denotes rookie driver.

#	Driver	Team	Make
1	Terry Labonte	Precision Products Racing	Oldsmobile
01	Mickey Gibbs	Gibbs Racing	Ford
2	Rick Mast	U.S. Racing	Pontiac
3	Dale Earnhardt	Richard Childress Racing	Chevrolet
4	Ernie Irvan	Morgan–McClure Motorsports	Oldsmobile
5	Ricky Rudd	Hendrick Motorsports	Chevrolet
6	Mark Martin	Roush Racing	Ford
7	Alan Kulwicki	AK Racing	Ford
8	Bobby Hillin Jr.	Stavola Brothers Racing	Buick
9	Bill Elliott	Melling Racing	Ford
10	Derrike Cope	Whitcomb Racing	Chevrolet
11	Geoff Bodine	Junior Johnson & Associates	Ford
12	Mike Alexander	Bobby Allison Motorsports	Buick
15	Morgan Shepherd	Bud Moore Engineering	Ford
17	Darrell Waltrip	Hendrick Motorsports	Chevrolet
19	Chad Little	Little Racing	Ford
20	Rob Moroso (R)	Moroso Racing	Oldsmobile
21	Neil Bonnett	Wood Brothers Racing	Ford
25	Ken Schrader	Hendrick Motorsports	Chevrolet
26	Brett Bodine	King Racing	Buick
27	Rusty Wallace	Blue Max Racing	Pontiac
28	Davey Allison	Robert Yates Racing	Ford
30	Michael Waltrip	Bahari Racing	Pontiac
33	Harry Gant	Leo Jackson Motorsports	Oldsmobile
36	H. B. Bailey	Bailey Racing	Pontiac
38	Dick Johnson	Dick Johnson Racing	Ford
42	Kyle Petty	SABCO Racing	Pontiac
43	Richard Petty	Petty Enterprises	Pontiac
46	Greg Sacks	Hendrick Motorsports	Chevrolet
47	Jack Pennington (R)	Close Racing	Oldsmobile
48	Norm Benning	Hylton Motorsports	Chevrolet
51	Hut Stricklin	Hendrick Motorsports	Chevrolet
52	Jimmy Means	Jimmy Means Racing	Pontiac
57	Jimmy Spencer	Osterlund Racing	Pontiac
66	Dick Trickle	Cale Yarborough Motorsports	Pontiac
70	J. D. McDuffie	McDuffie Racing	Pontiac
71	Dave Marcis	Marcis Auto Racing	Chevrolet
74	Mike Potter	Wawak Racing	Pontiac
75	Rick Wilson	RahMoc Enterprises	Oldsmobile
82	Mark Stahl	Stahl Racing	Ford
90	Buddy Baker	Donlavey Racing	Ford
94	Sterling Marlin	Hagan Racing	Oldsmobile
98	Butch Miller	Travis Carter Enterprises	Chevrolet

== Qualifying ==
Qualifying was originally scheduled to be split into two rounds. The first round was scheduled to be held on Thursday, March 29, at 3:00 PM EST. However, due to rain, the first round was cancelled, and qualifying was condensed into one round, which was held on Friday, March 30, at 2:00 PM EST. Each driver would have one lap to set a time. For this specific race, positions 1–40 would be decided on time, and depending on who needed it, a select amount of positions were given to cars who had not otherwise qualified but were high enough in owner's points; up to two provisionals were given.

Geoff Bodine, driving for Junior Johnson & Associates, would win the pole, setting a time of 30.170 and an average speed of 162.996 miles per hour (262.317 km/h).

Three drivers would fail to qualify.

=== Full qualifying results ===
Pos.	#	Driver	Team	Make	Time	Speed
1	11	Geoff Bodine	Junior Johnson & Associates	Ford	30.170	162.996
2	6	Mark Martin	Roush Racing	Ford	30.281	162.399
3	4	Ernie Irvan	Morgan–McClure Motorsports	Oldsmobile	30.460	161.445
4	26	Brett Bodine	King Racing	Buick	30.495	161.259
5	94	Sterling Marlin	Hagan Racing	Oldsmobile	30.582	160.800
6	25	Ken Schrader	Hendrick Motorsports	Chevrolet	30.686	160.255
7	46	Greg Sacks	Hendrick Motorsports	Chevrolet	30.703	160.167
8	42	Kyle Petty	SABCO Racing	Pontiac	30.789	159.719
9	30	Michael Waltrip	Bahari Racing	Pontiac	30.816	159.579
10	5	Ricky Rudd	Hendrick Motorsports	Chevrolet	30.834	159.486
11	27	Rusty Wallace	Blue Max Racing	Pontiac	30.838	159.466
12	20	Rob Moroso (R)	Moroso Racing	Oldsmobile	30.844	159.435
13	28	Davey Allison	Robert Yates Racing	Ford	30.875	159.274
14	7	Alan Kulwicki	AK Racing	Ford	30.907	159.110
15	3	Dale Earnhardt	Richard Childress Racing	Chevrolet	30.920	159.043
16	17	Darrell Waltrip	Hendrick Motorsports	Chevrolet	30.929	158.996
17	9	Bill Elliott	Melling Racing	Ford	30.935	158.966
18	21	Neil Bonnett	Wood Brothers Racing	Ford	30.951	158.883
19	15	Morgan Shepherd	Bud Moore Engineering	Ford	31.011	158.576
20	33	Harry Gant	Leo Jackson Motorsports	Oldsmobile	31.012	158.571
21	66	Dick Trickle	Cale Yarborough Motorsports	Pontiac	31.020	158.530
22	8	Bobby Hillin Jr.	Stavola Brothers Racing	Buick	31.061	158.321
23	2	Rick Mast	U.S. Racing	Pontiac	31.063	158.311
24	10	Derrike Cope	Whitcomb Racing	Chevrolet	31.123	158.005
25	43	Richard Petty	Petty Enterprises	Pontiac	31.172	157.757
26	75	Rick Wilson	RahMoc Enterprises	Oldsmobile	31.254	157.343
27	51	Hut Stricklin	Hendrick Motorsports	Chevrolet	31.336	156.931
28	1	Terry Labonte	Precision Products Racing	Oldsmobile	31.409	156.567
29	47	Jack Pennington (R)	Close Racing	Oldsmobile	31.448	156.372
30	90	Buddy Baker	Donlavey Racing	Ford	31.581	155.714
31	98	Butch Miller	Travis Carter Enterprises	Chevrolet	31.624	155.502
32	19	Chad Little	Little Racing	Ford	31.700	155.129
33	57	Jimmy Spencer	Osterlund Racing	Pontiac	31.739	154.939
34	71	Dave Marcis	Marcis Auto Racing	Chevrolet	31.818	154.554
35	12	Mike Alexander	Bobby Allison Motorsports	Buick	31.871	154.297
36	01	Mickey Gibbs	Gibbs Racing	Ford	32.031	153.526
37	70	J. D. McDuffie	McDuffie Racing	Pontiac	32.034	153.512
38	52	Jimmy Means	Jimmy Means Racing	Pontiac	32.105	153.172
39	38	Dick Johnson	Dick Johnson Racing	Ford	32.150	152.958
40	36	H. B. Bailey	Bailey Racing	Pontiac	32.653	150.602
Failed to qualify
41	48	Norm Benning	Hylton Motorsports	Chevrolet	32.676	150.496
42	74	Mike Potter	Wawak Racing	Pontiac	32.940	149.290
43	82	Mark Stahl	Stahl Racing	Ford	33.066	148.721
Official starting lineup

== Race results ==
Fin	St	#	Driver	Team	Make	Laps	Led	Status	Pts	Winnings
1	15	3	Dale Earnhardt	Richard Childress Racing	Chevrolet	367	129	running	180	$61,985
2	2	6	Mark Martin	Roush Racing	Ford	367	0	running	170	$34,460
3	13	28	Davey Allison	Robert Yates Racing	Ford	367	0	running	165	$25,795
4	1	11	Geoff Bodine	Junior Johnson & Associates	Ford	367	154	running	170	$28,110
5	19	15	Morgan Shepherd	Bud Moore Engineering	Ford	367	65	running	160	$17,610
6	20	33	Harry Gant	Leo Jackson Motorsports	Oldsmobile	367	0	running	150	$14,880
7	17	9	Bill Elliott	Melling Racing	Ford	367	3	running	151	$15,070
8	4	26	Brett Bodine	King Racing	Buick	367	1	running	147	$11,675
9	9	30	Michael Waltrip	Bahari Racing	Pontiac	367	0	running	138	$11,140
10	6	25	Ken Schrader	Hendrick Motorsports	Chevrolet	366	6	running	139	$14,585
11	16	17	Darrell Waltrip	Hendrick Motorsports	Chevrolet	366	0	running	130	$14,155
12	22	8	Bobby Hillin Jr.	Stavola Brothers Racing	Buick	365	0	running	127	$7,050
13	8	42	Kyle Petty	SABCO Racing	Pontiac	363	0	running	124	$9,780
14	28	1	Terry Labonte	Precision Products Racing	Oldsmobile	361	0	running	121	$8,590
15	34	71	Dave Marcis	Marcis Auto Racing	Chevrolet	360	0	running	118	$9,892
16	32	19	Chad Little	Little Racing	Ford	360	0	running	115	$4,215
17	31	98	Butch Miller	Travis Carter Enterprises	Chevrolet	360	0	running	112	$4,085
18	11	27	Rusty Wallace	Blue Max Racing	Pontiac	359	0	running	109	$14,900
19	35	12	Mike Alexander	Bobby Allison Motorsports	Buick	356	0	accident	106	$3,790
20	29	47	Jack Pennington (R)	Close Racing	Oldsmobile	354	0	running	103	$5,635
21	25	43	Richard Petty	Petty Enterprises	Pontiac	349	0	engine	100	$5,390
22	21	66	Dick Trickle	Cale Yarborough Motorsports	Pontiac	298	5	engine	102	$8,120
23	14	7	Alan Kulwicki	AK Racing	Ford	295	2	accident	99	$6,750
24	10	5	Ricky Rudd	Hendrick Motorsports	Chevrolet	294	0	running	91	$6,480
25	33	57	Jimmy Spencer	Osterlund Racing	Pontiac	280	1	running	93	$6,385
26	12	20	Rob Moroso (R)	Moroso Racing	Oldsmobile	234	0	handling	85	$3,470
27	24	10	Derrike Cope	Whitcomb Racing	Chevrolet	224	0	engine	82	$8,170
28	5	94	Sterling Marlin	Hagan Racing	Oldsmobile	211	0	accident	79	$6,570
29	26	75	Rick Wilson	RahMoc Enterprises	Oldsmobile	211	0	accident	76	$5,910
30	18	21	Neil Bonnett	Wood Brothers Racing	Ford	209	0	accident	73	$5,775
31	38	52	Jimmy Means	Jimmy Means Racing	Pontiac	208	0	accident	70	$3,665
32	3	4	Ernie Irvan	Morgan–McClure Motorsports	Oldsmobile	201	0	accident	67	$6,680
33	40	36	H. B. Bailey	Bailey Racing	Pontiac	168	0	flagged	64	$2,870
34	39	38	Dick Johnson	Dick Johnson Racing	Ford	95	0	handling	61	$2,835
35	37	70	J. D. McDuffie	McDuffie Racing	Pontiac	82	0	head gasket	58	$2,800
36	27	51	Hut Stricklin	Hendrick Motorsports	Chevrolet	82	0	flagged	55	$2,765
37	7	46	Greg Sacks	Hendrick Motorsports	Chevrolet	61	0	crankshaft	52	$2,730
38	36	01	Mickey Gibbs	Gibbs Racing	Ford	53	1	engine	54	$2,715
39	23	2	Rick Mast	U.S. Racing	Pontiac	42	0	engine	46	$5,350
40	30	90	Buddy Baker	Donlavey Racing	Ford	9	0	engine	43	$2,650
Official race results

== Standings after the race ==
Drivers' Championship standings

	Pos	Driver	Points
	1	Dale Earnhardt	839
	2	Morgan Shepherd	761 (-78)
2	3	Geoff Bodine	708 (-131)
	4	Kyle Petty	685 (–154)
2	5	Bill Elliott	677 (–162)
3	6	Rusty Wallace	671 (–168)
6	7	Mark Martin	654 (–185)
1	8	Ken Schrader	646 (–193)
5	9	Brett Bodine	619 (–220)
2	10	Darrell Waltrip	618 (–221)
Official driver's standings

- Note: Only the first 10 positions are included for the driver standings.

Previous race: 1990 Motorcraft Quality Parts 500	NASCAR Winston Cup Series; 1990 season	Next race: 1990 Valleydale Meats 500
