= 1990 Pontiac Excitement 400 =

Second race of the 1990 NASCAR Winston Cup Series

Race details
- Race 2 of 29 in the 1990 NASCAR Winston Cup Series
- The 1990 Pontiac Excitement 400 program cover, with artwork by NASCAR artist Sam Bass.
- Date: February 25, 1990
- Official name: 36th Annual Pontiac Excitement 400
- Location: Richmond, Virginia, Richmond International Raceway
- Course: Permanent racing facility
- Course length: 0.75 miles (1.207 km)
- Distance: 400 laps, 300 mi (482.803 km)
- Average speed: 92.158 miles per hour (148.314 km/h)
- Attendance: 50,000

Pole position
| Driver | Ricky Rudd | Hendrick Motorsports |
- Time: 22.572

Most laps led
| Driver | Rusty Wallace | Blue Max Racing |
- Laps: 148

Winner
| No. 6 | Mark Martin | Roush Racing |

Television in the United States
- Network: TBS
- Announcers: Ken Squier, Chris Economaki

Radio in the United States
- Radio: Motor Racing Network

The 1990 Pontiac Excitement 400 was the second stock car race of the 1990 NASCAR Winston Cup Series season and the 36th iteration of the event. The race was held on Sunday, February 25, 1990, before an audience of 50,000 in Richmond, Virginia, at Richmond International Raceway, a 0.75 miles (1.21 km) D-shaped oval. The race took the scheduled 400 laps to complete. In the final laps of the race, Roush Racing driver Mark Martin would manage to make a late-race charge to the front, passing for the lead with 16 laps left in the race to take his second career NASCAR Winston Cup Series victory and his first victory of the season. To fill out the top three, Richard Childress Racing driver Dale Earnhardt and Hendrick Motorsports driver Ricky Rudd would finish second and third, respectively.

After the race, Martin's car was found to have an illegal carburetor spacer, with the spacer being half an inch wider than the maximum allowance of 2 inches (5.1 cm) NASCAR had set according to the Richmond Times-Dispatch. In response, NASCAR officials decided to fine Martin USD$40,000 (adjusted for inflation, USD$98,574), the largest fine ever levied in NASCAR history up to that point, along with 46 driver's championship points. The punishment was considered extremely harsh and severe by NASCAR media along with Martin's team, in which Martin said in an interview with The Charlotte Observer "It's like running a stop sign when nothing's coming, but a policeman catches you... you shouldn't get a ticket for it, but you broke the law and you have to pay for it. But this is like getting the death penalty for it."

== Background ==
The layout of Richmond International Raceway, the venue where the race was at.

Richmond International Raceway (RIR) is a 3/4-mile (1.2 km), D-shaped, asphalt race track located just outside Richmond, Virginia in Henrico County. It hosts the Monster Energy NASCAR Cup Series and Xfinity Series. Known as "America's premier short track", it formerly hosted a NASCAR Camping World Truck Series race, an IndyCar Series race, and two USAC sprint car races.

=== Entry list ===
- (R) denotes rookie driver.

| # | Driver | Team | Make |
|---|---|---|---|
| 1 | Terry Labonte | Precision Products Racing | Oldsmobile |
| 01 | Mickey Gibbs | Gibbs Racing | Ford |
| 2 | Rick Mast | U.S. Racing | Pontiac |
| 3 | Dale Earnhardt | Richard Childress Racing | Chevrolet |
| 4 | Phil Parsons | Morgan–McClure Motorsports | Oldsmobile |
| 04 | Bill Meacham | Meacham Racing | Oldsmobile |
| 5 | Ricky Rudd | Hendrick Motorsports | Chevrolet |
| 6 | Mark Martin | Roush Racing | Ford |
| 7 | Alan Kulwicki | AK Racing | Ford |
| 8 | Bobby Hillin Jr. | Stavola Brothers Racing | Buick |
| 9 | Bill Elliott | Melling Racing | Ford |
| 10 | Derrike Cope | Whitcomb Racing | Chevrolet |
| 11 | Geoff Bodine | Junior Johnson & Associates | Ford |
| 12 | Mike Alexander | Bobby Allison Motorsports | Buick |
| 15 | Morgan Shepherd | Bud Moore Engineering | Ford |
| 16 | Larry Pearson | Pearson Racing | Buick |
| 17 | Darrell Waltrip | Hendrick Motorsports | Chevrolet |
| 19 | Chad Little | Little Racing | Ford |
| 20 | Rob Moroso (R) | Moroso Racing | Oldsmobile |
| 21 | Neil Bonnett | Wood Brothers Racing | Ford |
| 25 | Ken Schrader | Hendrick Motorsports | Chevrolet |
| 26 | Brett Bodine | King Racing | Buick |
| 27 | Rusty Wallace | Blue Max Racing | Pontiac |
| 28 | Davey Allison | Robert Yates Racing | Ford |
| 30 | Michael Waltrip | Bahari Racing | Pontiac |
| 33 | Harry Gant | Leo Jackson Motorsports | Oldsmobile |
| 42 | Kyle Petty | SABCO Racing | Pontiac |
| 43 | Richard Petty | Petty Enterprises | Pontiac |
| 52 | Jimmy Means | Jimmy Means Racing | Pontiac |
| 53 | Jerry O'Neil (R) | Aroneck Racing | Oldsmobile |
| 57 | Jimmy Spencer | Osterlund Racing | Pontiac |
| 66 | Dick Trickle | Cale Yarborough Motorsports | Pontiac |
| 70 | J. D. McDuffie | McDuffie Racing | Pontiac |
| 71 | Dave Marcis | Marcis Auto Racing | Chevrolet |
| 75 | Rick Wilson | RahMoc Enterprises | Oldsmobile |
| 83 | Tommy Ellis | Speed Racing | Oldsmobile |
| 90 | Ernie Irvan | Donlavey Racing | Ford |
| 94 | Sterling Marlin | Hagan Racing | Oldsmobile |
| 98 | Butch Miller | Travis Carter Enterprises | Chevrolet |

== Qualifying ==
Qualifying was split into two rounds. The first round was held on Friday, February 22, at 3:00 PM EST. Each driver would have one lap to set a time. During the first round, the top 20 drivers in the round would be guaranteed a starting spot in the race. If a driver was not able to guarantee a spot in the first round, they had the option to scrub their time from the first round and try and run a faster lap time in a second round qualifying run, held on Saturday, February 23, at 11:00 AM EST. As with the first round, each driver would have one lap to set a time. For this specific race, positions 21-34 would be decided on time, and depending on who needed it, a select amount of positions were given to cars who had not otherwise qualified but were high enough in owner's points; up to two were given.

Ricky Rudd, driving for Hendrick Motorsports, would win the pole, setting a time of 22.572 and an average speed of 119.617 miles per hour (192.505 km/h) in the first round.

=== Full qualifying results ===
| Pos. | # | Driver | Team | Make | Time | Speed |
|---|---|---|---|---|---|---|
| 1 | 5 | Ricky Rudd | Hendrick Motorsports | Chevrolet | 22.572 | 119.617 |
| 2 | 11 | Geoff Bodine | Junior Johnson & Associates | Ford | 22.575 | 119.601 |
| 3 | 7 | Alan Kulwicki | AK Racing | Ford | 22.588 | 119.532 |
| 4 | 3 | Dale Earnhardt | Richard Childress Racing | Chevrolet | 22.598 | 119.480 |
| 5 | 66 | Dick Trickle | Cale Yarborough Motorsports | Pontiac | 22.616 | 119.385 |
| 6 | 6 | Mark Martin | Roush Racing | Ford | 22.627 | 119.326 |
| 7 | 42 | Kyle Petty | SABCO Racing | Pontiac | 22.641 | 119.253 |
| 8 | 17 | Darrell Waltrip | Hendrick Motorsports | Chevrolet | 22.688 | 119.006 |
| 9 | 20 | Rob Moroso (R) | Moroso Racing | Oldsmobile | 22.724 | 118.817 |
| 10 | 26 | Brett Bodine | King Racing | Buick | 22.767 | 118.593 |
| 11 | 94 | Sterling Marlin | Hagan Racing | Oldsmobile | 22.786 | 118.494 |
| 12 | 21 | Neil Bonnett | Wood Brothers Racing | Ford | 22.805 | 118.395 |
| 13 | 25 | Ken Schrader | Hendrick Motorsports | Chevrolet | 22.816 | 118.338 |
| 14 | 15 | Morgan Shepherd | Bud Moore Engineering | Ford | 22.832 | 118.255 |
| 15 | 4 | Phil Parsons | Morgan–McClure Motorsports | Oldsmobile | 22.847 | 118.177 |
| 16 | 90 | Ernie Irvan | Donlavey Racing | Ford | 22.865 | 118.084 |
| 17 | 9 | Bill Elliott | Melling Racing | Ford | 22.875 | 118.033 |
| 18 | 27 | Rusty Wallace | Blue Max Racing | Pontiac | 22.891 | 117.950 |
| 19 | 98 | Butch Miller | Travis Carter Enterprises | Chevrolet | 22.891 | 117.950 |
| 20 | 10 | Derrike Cope | Whitcomb Racing | Chevrolet | 22.928 | 117.760 |
Failed to lock in Round 1
| 21 | 57 | Jimmy Spencer | Osterlund Racing | Pontiac | 22.765 | 118.603 |
| 22 | 33 | Harry Gant | Leo Jackson Motorsports | Oldsmobile | 22.809 | 118.374 |
| 23 | 30 | Michael Waltrip | Bahari Racing | Pontiac | 22.897 | 117.919 |
| 24 | 12 | Mike Alexander | Bobby Allison Motorsports | Buick | 22.974 | 117.524 |
| 25 | 1 | Terry Labonte | Precision Products Racing | Oldsmobile | 22.985 | 117.468 |
| 26 | 75 | Rick Wilson | RahMoc Enterprises | Oldsmobile | 22.986 | 117.463 |
| 27 | 19 | Chad Little | Little Racing | Ford | 23.042 | 117.177 |
| 28 | 8 | Bobby Hillin Jr. | Stavola Brothers Racing | Buick | 23.067 | 117.050 |
| 29 | 01 | Mickey Gibbs | Gibbs Racing | Ford | 23.119 | 116.787 |
| 30 | 16 | Larry Pearson | Pearson Racing | Buick | 23.126 | 116.752 |
| 31 | 28 | Davey Allison | Robert Yates Racing | Ford | 23.199 | 116.384 |
| 32 | 52 | Jimmy Means | Jimmy Means Racing | Pontiac | 23.214 | 116.309 |
| 33 | 04 | Bill Meacham | Meacham Racing | Oldsmobile | 23.232 | 116.219 |
| 34 | 2 | Rick Mast | U.S. Racing | Pontiac | 23.286 | 115.949 |
Provisionals
| 35 | 71 | Dave Marcis | Marcis Auto Racing | Chevrolet | -* | -* |
| 36 | 43 | Richard Petty | Petty Enterprises | Pontiac | -* | -* |
Failed to qualify
| 37 | 70 | J. D. McDuffie | McDuffie Racing | Pontiac | -* | -* |
| 38 | 53 | Jerry O'Neil (R) | Aroneck Racing | Oldsmobile | -* | -* |
| 39 | 83 | Tommy Ellis | Speed Racing | Oldsmobile | -* | -* |
Official first round qualifying results
Official starting lineup

== Race results ==
| Fin | St | # | Driver | Team | Make | Laps | Led | Status | Pts | Winnings |
|---|---|---|---|---|---|---|---|---|---|---|
| 1 | 6 | 6 | Mark Martin | Roush Racing | Ford | 400 | 16 | running | 134 | $59,150 |
| 2 | 4 | 3 | Dale Earnhardt | Richard Childress Racing | Chevrolet | 400 | 41 | running | 175 | $42,600 |
| 3 | 1 | 5 | Ricky Rudd | Hendrick Motorsports | Chevrolet | 400 | 40 | running | 170 | $25,050 |
| 4 | 17 | 9 | Bill Elliott | Melling Racing | Ford | 400 | 0 | running | 160 | $16,650 |
| 5 | 5 | 66 | Dick Trickle | Cale Yarborough Motorsports | Pontiac | 400 | 13 | running | 160 | $14,325 |
| 6 | 18 | 27 | Rusty Wallace | Blue Max Racing | Pontiac | 400 | 148 | running | 160 | $15,400 |
| 7 | 14 | 15 | Morgan Shepherd | Bud Moore Engineering | Ford | 400 | 0 | running | 146 | $8,525 |
| 8 | 10 | 26 | Brett Bodine | King Racing | Buick | 400 | 0 | running | 142 | $8,025 |
| 9 | 21 | 57 | Jimmy Spencer | Osterlund Racing | Pontiac | 400 | 0 | running | 138 | $6,425 |
| 10 | 13 | 25 | Ken Schrader | Hendrick Motorsports | Chevrolet | 400 | 0 | running | 134 | $11,800 |
| 11 | 7 | 42 | Kyle Petty | SABCO Racing | Pontiac | 399 | 0 | running | 130 | $5,075 |
| 12 | 8 | 17 | Darrell Waltrip | Hendrick Motorsports | Chevrolet | 399 | 0 | running | 127 | $10,450 |
| 13 | 11 | 94 | Sterling Marlin | Hagan Racing | Oldsmobile | 399 | 0 | running | 124 | $6,725 |
| 14 | 24 | 12 | Mike Alexander | Bobby Allison Motorsports | Buick | 397 | 0 | running | 121 | $3,275 |
| 15 | 9 | 20 | Rob Moroso (R) | Moroso Racing | Oldsmobile | 397 | 0 | running | 118 | $4,400 |
| 16 | 27 | 19 | Chad Little | Little Racing | Ford | 397 | 0 | running | 115 | $3,125 |
| 17 | 35 | 71 | Dave Marcis | Marcis Auto Racing | Chevrolet | 397 | 0 | running | 112 | $6,832 |
| 18 | 32 | 52 | Jimmy Means | Jimmy Means Racing | Pontiac | 394 | 0 | running | 109 | $4,125 |
| 19 | 29 | 01 | Mickey Gibbs | Gibbs Racing | Ford | 394 | 0 | running | 106 | $2,900 |
| 20 | 31 | 28 | Davey Allison | Robert Yates Racing | Ford | 393 | 0 | running | 103 | $9,650 |
| 21 | 34 | 2 | Rick Mast | U.S. Racing | Pontiac | 392 | 0 | running | 100 | $5,825 |
| 22 | 16 | 90 | Ernie Irvan | Donlavey Racing | Ford | 387 | 0 | clutch | 97 | $2,775 |
| 23 | 30 | 16 | Larry Pearson | Pearson Racing | Buick | 386 | 0 | running | 94 | $5,550 |
| 24 | 3 | 7 | Alan Kulwicki | AK Racing | Ford | 358 | 100 | running | 96 | $7,025 |
| 25 | 12 | 21 | Neil Bonnett | Wood Brothers Racing | Ford | 354 | 0 | battery | 88 | $5,450 |
| 26 | 15 | 4 | Phil Parsons | Morgan–McClure Motorsports | Oldsmobile | 354 | 0 | running | 85 | $5,275 |
| 27 | 23 | 30 | Michael Waltrip | Bahari Racing | Pontiac | 350 | 0 | running | 82 | $5,275 |
| 28 | 19 | 98 | Butch Miller | Travis Carter Enterprises | Chevrolet | 307 | 1 | accident | 84 | $2,545 |
| 29 | 20 | 10 | Derrike Cope | Whitcomb Racing | Chevrolet | 305 | 0 | accident | 76 | $8,225 |
| 30 | 26 | 75 | Rick Wilson | RahMoc Enterprises | Oldsmobile | 283 | 0 | accident | 73 | $6,100 |
| 31 | 28 | 8 | Bobby Hillin Jr. | Stavola Brothers Racing | Buick | 230 | 0 | accident | 70 | $4,475 |
| 32 | 25 | 1 | Terry Labonte | Precision Products Racing | Oldsmobile | 229 | 0 | engine | 67 | $4,450 |
| 33 | 2 | 11 | Geoff Bodine | Junior Johnson & Associates | Ford | 200 | 41 | engine | 69 | $8,560 |
| 34 | 33 | 04 | Bill Meacham | Meacham Racing | Oldsmobile | 87 | 0 | rear end | 61 | $2,425 |
| 35 | 36 | 43 | Richard Petty | Petty Enterprises | Pontiac | 83 | 0 | accident | 58 | $2,425 |
| 36 | 22 | 33 | Harry Gant | Leo Jackson Motorsports | Oldsmobile | 75 | 0 | engine | 55 | $8,250 |
Official race results

== Standings after the race ==
Drivers' Championship standings

| | Pos | Driver | Points |
|---|---|---|---|
| 4 | 1 | Dale Earnhardt | 340 |
| 2 | 2 | Ricky Rudd | 335 (-5) |
| | 3 | Bill Elliott | 330 (-10) |
| 3 | 4 | Rusty Wallace | 306 (–34) |
| 7 | 5 | Dick Trickle | 287 (–53) |
| 4 | 6 | Morgan Shepherd | 280 (–61) |
| 7 | 7 | Jimmy Spencer | 261 (–79) |
| 7 | 8 | Derrike Cope | 256 (–84) |
| 9 | 9 | Brett Bodine | 254 (–86) |
| 5 | 10 | Darrell Waltrip | 248 (–92) |
Official driver's standings

- Note: Only the first 10 positions are included for the driver standings.

| Previous race: 1990 Daytona 500 | NASCAR Winston Cup Series; 1990 season | Next race: 1990 GM Goodwrench 500 |
