= 1990 GM Goodwrench 500 =

Third race of the 1990 NASCAR Winston Cup Series

Race details
- Race 3 of 29 in the 1990 NASCAR Winston Cup Series
- The 1990 GM Goodwrench 500 program cover, featuring Dale Earnhardt.
- Date: March 4, 1990
- Official name: 25th Annual GM Goodwrench 500
- Location: Rockingham, North Carolina, North Carolina Speedway
- Course: Permanent racing facility
- Course length: 1.017 miles (1.637 km)
- Distance: 492 laps, 500.364 mi (805.257 km)
- Scheduled distance: 492 laps, 500.364 mi (805.257 km)
- Average speed: 122.864 miles per hour (197.730 km/h)
- Attendance: 52,700

Pole position
Driver	Kyle Petty	SABCO Racing
- Time: 24.613

Most laps led
Driver	Kyle Petty	SABCO Racing
- Laps: 433

Winner
No. 42	Kyle Petty	SABCO Racing

Television in the United States
- Network: ESPN
- Announcers: Bob Jenkins, Benny Parsons, Ned Jarrett

Radio in the United States
- Radio: Motor Racing Network

The 1990 GM Goodwrench 500 was the third stock car race of the 1990 NASCAR Winston Cup Series season and the 25th iteration of the event. The race was held on Sunday, March 4, 1990, before an audience of 52,700 in Rockingham, North Carolina, at North Carolina Speedway, a 1.017 miles (1.637 km) permanent high-banked racetrack. At race's end, SABCO Racing driver Kyle Petty would manage to dominate a majority of the race to take his third career NASCAR Winston Cup Series victory and his only victory of the season. To fill out the top three, Junior Johnson & Associates driver Geoff Bodine and Hendrick Motorsports driver Ken Schrader would finish second and third, respectively.

Terri O'Connell, (Note: Listed as J. T. Hayes per NASCAR) driving a second car for Donlavey Racing, is credited with being the only openly transgender driver to ever race in the NASCAR Winston Cup Series to date, finishing last in a 38-car field.

== Background ==
The layout of North Carolina Motor Speedway, the venue where the race was held.

North Carolina Motor Speedway was opened as a flat, one-mile oval on October 31, 1965. In 1969, the track was extensively reconfigured to a high-banked, D-shaped oval just over one mile in length. In 1997, North Carolina Motor Speedway merged with Penske Motorsports, and was renamed North Carolina Speedway. Shortly thereafter, the infield was reconfigured, and competition on the infield road course, mostly by the SCCA, was discontinued. Currently, the track is home to the Fast Track High Performance Driving School.

=== Entry list ===
- (R) denotes rookie driver.

#	Driver	Team	Make
1	Terry Labonte	Precision Products Racing	Oldsmobile
01	Mickey Gibbs	Gibbs Racing	Ford
2	Rick Mast	U.S. Racing	Pontiac
3	Dale Earnhardt	Richard Childress Racing	Chevrolet
4	Phil Parsons	Morgan–McClure Motorsports	Oldsmobile
5	Ricky Rudd	Hendrick Motorsports	Chevrolet
6	Mark Martin	Roush Racing	Ford
7	Alan Kulwicki	AK Racing	Ford
8	Bobby Hillin Jr.	Stavola Brothers Racing	Buick
9	Bill Elliott	Melling Racing	Ford
10	Derrike Cope	Whitcomb Racing	Chevrolet
11	Geoff Bodine	Junior Johnson & Associates	Ford
12	Mike Alexander	Bobby Allison Motorsports	Buick
15	Morgan Shepherd	Bud Moore Engineering	Ford
16	Larry Pearson	Pearson Racing	Buick
17	Darrell Waltrip	Hendrick Motorsports	Chevrolet
20	Rob Moroso (R)	Moroso Racing	Oldsmobile
21	Neil Bonnett	Wood Brothers Racing	Ford
25	Ken Schrader	Hendrick Motorsports	Chevrolet
26	Brett Bodine	King Racing	Buick
27	Rusty Wallace	Blue Max Racing	Pontiac
28	Davey Allison	Robert Yates Racing	Ford
30	Michael Waltrip	Bahari Racing	Pontiac
33	Harry Gant	Leo Jackson Motorsports	Oldsmobile
42	Kyle Petty	SABCO Racing	Pontiac
43	Richard Petty	Petty Enterprises	Pontiac
52	Jimmy Means	Jimmy Means Racing	Pontiac
57	Jimmy Spencer	Osterlund Racing	Pontiac
66	Dick Trickle	Cale Yarborough Motorsports	Pontiac
70	J. D. McDuffie	McDuffie Racing	Pontiac
71	Dave Marcis	Marcis Auto Racing	Chevrolet
75	Rick Wilson	RahMoc Enterprises	Oldsmobile
82	Mark Stahl	Stahl Racing	Ford
90	Ernie Irvan	Donlavey Racing	Ford
91	Terri O'Connell	Donlavey Racing	Ford
93	Charlie Baker	Baker Racing	Buick
94	Sterling Marlin	Hagan Racing	Oldsmobile
98	Butch Miller	Travis Carter Enterprises	Chevrolet

== Qualifying ==
Qualifying was originally scheduled to be split into two rounds. The first round was held on Thursday, March 1, at 2:30 PM EST. Originally, the first 20 positions were going to be determined by first round qualifying, with positions 21-40 meant to be determined the following day on Friday, March 2. However, due to rain, the second round was cancelled. As a result, the rest of the starting lineup was set using the results from the first round. Depending on who needed it, a select amount of positions were given to cars who had not otherwise qualified but were high enough in owner's points; up to two were given.

Kyle Petty, driving for SABCO Racing, would win the pole, setting a time of 24.613 and an average speed of 148.751 miles per hour (239.392 km/h) in the first round.

No drivers would fail to qualify.

=== Full qualifying results ===
Pos.	#	Driver	Team	Make	Time	Speed
1	42	Kyle Petty	SABCO Racing	Pontiac	24.613	148.751
2	6	Mark Martin	Roush Racing	Ford	24.801	147.623
3	7	Alan Kulwicki	AK Racing	Ford	24.875	147.184
4	3	Dale Earnhardt	Richard Childress Racing	Chevrolet	24.876	147.178
5	17	Darrell Waltrip	Hendrick Motorsports	Chevrolet	24.876	147.178
6	25	Ken Schrader	Hendrick Motorsports	Chevrolet	24.903	147.018
7	27	Rusty Wallace	Blue Max Racing	Pontiac	24.904	147.013
8	11	Geoff Bodine	Junior Johnson & Associates	Ford	24.908	146.989
9	20	Rob Moroso (R)	Moroso Racing	Oldsmobile	24.933	146.842
10	94	Sterling Marlin	Hagan Racing	Oldsmobile	24.997	146.466
11	9	Bill Elliott	Melling Racing	Ford	25.005	146.419
12	4	Phil Parsons	Morgan–McClure Motorsports	Oldsmobile	25.005	146.419
13	66	Dick Trickle	Cale Yarborough Motorsports	Pontiac	25.041	146.208
14	30	Michael Waltrip	Bahari Racing	Pontiac	25.075	146.010
15	10	Derrike Cope	Whitcomb Racing	Chevrolet	25.113	145.789
16	71	Dave Marcis	Marcis Auto Racing	Chevrolet	25.138	145.644
17	90	Ernie Irvan	Donlavey Racing	Ford	25.141	145.627
18	28	Davey Allison	Robert Yates Racing	Ford	25.148	145.586
19	33	Harry Gant	Leo Jackson Motorsports	Oldsmobile	25.149	145.580
20	2	Rick Mast	U.S. Racing	Pontiac	25.153	145.557
Failed to lock in Round 1
21	26	Brett Bodine	King Racing	Buick	25.154	145.551
22	16	Larry Pearson	Pearson Racing	Buick	25.167	145.476
23	21	Neil Bonnett	Wood Brothers Racing	Ford	25.187	145.361
24	8	Bobby Hillin Jr.	Stavola Brothers Racing	Buick	25.199	145.291
25	5	Ricky Rudd	Hendrick Motorsports	Chevrolet	25.294	144.746
26	57	Jimmy Spencer	Osterlund Racing	Pontiac	25.318	144.609
27	15	Morgan Shepherd	Bud Moore Engineering	Ford	25.318	144.609
28	1	Terry Labonte	Precision Products Racing	Oldsmobile	25.354	144.403
29	75	Rick Wilson	RahMoc Enterprises	Oldsmobile	25.419	144.034
30	12	Mike Alexander	Bobby Allison Motorsports	Buick	25.427	143.989
31	01	Mickey Gibbs	Gibbs Racing	Ford	25.561	143.234
32	43	Richard Petty	Petty Enterprises	Pontiac	25.582	143.116
33	52	Jimmy Means	Jimmy Means Racing	Pontiac	25.876	141.490
34	93	Charlie Baker	Baker Racing	Buick	25.944	141.119
35	82	Mark Stahl	Stahl Racing	Ford	26.008	140.772
36	70	J. D. McDuffie	McDuffie Racing	Pontiac	26.438	138.482
37	98	Butch Miller	Travis Carter Enterprises	Chevrolet	-	-
38	91	Terri O'Connell	Donlavey Racing	Ford	-	-
Official first round qualifying results
Official starting lineup

== Race results ==
Fin	St	#	Driver	Team	Make	Laps	Led	Status	Pts	Winnings
1	1	42	Kyle Petty	SABCO Racing	Pontiac	492	433	running	185	$284,450
2	8	11	Geoff Bodine	Junior Johnson & Associates	Ford	492	1	running	175	$31,825
3	6	25	Ken Schrader	Hendrick Motorsports	Chevrolet	491	0	running	165	$24,575
4	10	94	Sterling Marlin	Hagan Racing	Oldsmobile	490	3	running	165	$17,725
5	7	27	Rusty Wallace	Blue Max Racing	Pontiac	490	28	running	160	$21,625
6	5	17	Darrell Waltrip	Hendrick Motorsports	Chevrolet	489	0	running	150	$16,275
7	27	15	Morgan Shepherd	Bud Moore Engineering	Ford	489	0	running	146	$10,975
8	26	57	Jimmy Spencer	Osterlund Racing	Pontiac	489	0	running	142	$10,525
9	28	1	Terry Labonte	Precision Products Racing	Oldsmobile	489	1	running	143	$10,225
10	4	3	Dale Earnhardt	Richard Childress Racing	Chevrolet	489	0	running	134	$17,150
11	19	33	Harry Gant	Leo Jackson Motorsports	Oldsmobile	488	0	running	130	$12,775
12	15	10	Derrike Cope	Whitcomb Racing	Chevrolet	487	0	running	127	$10,475
13	37	98	Butch Miller	Travis Carter Enterprises	Chevrolet	486	0	running	124	$5,832
14	12	4	Phil Parsons	Morgan–McClure Motorsports	Oldsmobile	486	0	running	121	$8,975
15	31	01	Mickey Gibbs	Gibbs Racing	Ford	484	0	running	118	$5,350
16	30	12	Mike Alexander	Bobby Allison Motorsports	Buick	484	0	running	115	$4,775
17	24	8	Bobby Hillin Jr.	Stavola Brothers Racing	Buick	483	0	running	112	$8,425
18	29	75	Rick Wilson	RahMoc Enterprises	Oldsmobile	482	0	running	109	$8,075
19	20	2	Rick Mast	U.S. Racing	Pontiac	479	0	running	106	$7,575
20	22	16	Larry Pearson	Pearson Racing	Buick	477	0	running	103	$8,000
21	33	52	Jimmy Means	Jimmy Means Racing	Pontiac	470	0	running	100	$4,925
22	16	71	Dave Marcis	Marcis Auto Racing	Chevrolet	461	0	running	97	$6,800
23	13	66	Dick Trickle	Cale Yarborough Motorsports	Pontiac	439	1	accident	99	$7,600
24	35	82	Mark Stahl	Stahl Racing	Ford	434	0	running	91	$3,675
25	21	26	Brett Bodine	King Racing	Buick	429	0	running	88	$6,450
26	2	6	Mark Martin	Roush Racing	Ford	420	8	valve	90	$12,050
27	3	7	Alan Kulwicki	AK Racing	Ford	415	0	timing chain	82	$6,800
28	14	30	Michael Waltrip	Bahari Racing	Pontiac	398	0	engine	79	$6,125
29	17	90	Ernie Irvan	Donlavey Racing	Ford	397	0	accident	76	$3,375
30	9	20	Rob Moroso (R)	Moroso Racing	Oldsmobile	324	0	engine	73	$4,075
31	25	5	Ricky Rudd	Hendrick Motorsports	Chevrolet	302	15	oil pan	75	$6,600
32	32	43	Richard Petty	Petty Enterprises	Pontiac	294	0	engine	67	$3,775
33	11	9	Bill Elliott	Melling Racing	Ford	265	2	accident	69	$11,600
34	18	28	Davey Allison	Robert Yates Racing	Ford	263	0	engine	61	$10,950
35	36	70	J. D. McDuffie	McDuffie Racing	Pontiac	171	0	handling	58	$2,825
36	23	21	Neil Bonnett	Wood Brothers Racing	Ford	95	0	engine	55	$5,350
37	34	93	Charlie Baker	Baker Racing	Buick	49	0	engine	52	$2,725
38	38	91	Terri O'Connell	Donlavey Racing	Ford	10	0	flagged	49	$2,700
Official race results

== Standings after the race ==
Drivers' Championship standings

	Pos	Driver	Points
	1	Dale Earnhardt	474
2	2	Rusty Wallace	466 (-8)
3	3	Morgan Shepherd	426 (-48)
2	4	Ricky Rudd	410 (–64)
11	5	Kyle Petty	406 (–68)
1	6	Jimmy Spencer	403 (–71)
4	7	Bill Elliott	399 (–75)
2	8	Darrell Waltrip	398 (–76)
4	9	Sterling Marlin	395 (–79)
9	10	Geoff Bodine	387 (–87)
Official driver's standings

- Note: Only the first 10 positions are included for the driver standings.

== Notes ==
Previous race: 1990 Pontiac Excitement 400	NASCAR Winston Cup Series; 1990 season	Next race: 1990 Motorcraft Quality Parts 500
