= 1989 Atlanta Journal 500 =

29th race of the 1989 NASCAR Winston Cup Series

Race details
- Race 29 of 29 in the 1989 NASCAR Winston Cup Series
- The 1989 Atlanta Journal 500 program cover, featuring Rusty Wallace.
- Date: November 19, 1989
- Official name: 30th Annual Atlanta Journal 500
- Location: Hampton, Georgia, Atlanta International Raceway
- Course: Permanent racing facility
- Course length: 1.522 miles (2.449 km)
- Distance: 328 laps, 499.216 mi (803.41 km)
- Average speed: 140.229 miles per hour (225.677 km/h)
- Attendance: 83,000

Pole position
Driver	Alan Kulwicki	AK Racing
- Time: 30.591

Most laps led
Driver	Dale Earnhardt	Richard Childress Racing
- Laps: 249

Winner
No. 3	Dale Earnhardt	Richard Childress Racing

Television in the United States
- Network: ESPN
- Announcers: Bob Jenkins, Ned Jarrett, Benny Parsons

Radio in the United States
- Radio: Motor Racing Network

The 1989 Atlanta Journal 500 was the 29th and final stock car race of the 1989 NASCAR Winston Cup Series season and the 30th iteration of the event. The race was held on Sunday, November 19, 1989, before an audience of 83,000 in Hampton, Georgia, at Atlanta International Raceway, a 1.522 miles (2.449 km) permanent asphalt quad-oval intermediate speedway. The race took the scheduled 328 laps to complete. At race's end, Richard Childress Racing driver Dale Earnhardt would manage to dominate a majority of the race, leading 294 laps to take his 39th career NASCAR Winston Cup Series victory and his fifth victory of the season.

In the NASCAR Winston Cup Series driver's championship battle, Rusty Wallace, needing an 18th place finish or better to clinch the championship, would manage to overcome late-race issues and maintain the 15th position, finishing three laps behind Earnhardt to clinch his first and only Winston Cup Series championship.

The race was marred by the death of independent driver Grant Adcox. On lap 203 of the race, Adcox would crash in the first turn, with the front of the car accelerating into the outside wall, destroying the front of the car and the car being set on fire. After being sent to the Georgia Baptist Hospital, Adcox was pronounced dead at 4:15 PM EST due to massive head and chest injuries.

Differing accounts on how the crash first occurred exist. According to Adcox's crew chief, Pete Card, Jim Sauter, who was ahead of Adcox, drifted down the turn and hit the right rear of Adcox's car. However, according to Sauter, Sauter stated that he was both was hit by Adcox and was behind Adcox at the time of the accident. A reporter for The Anniston Star who was at the track, Mark McCarter, reported that Adcox's car blew a tire. In a press statement given out by Goodyear spokesman Bill King, he disputed this, saying that the crash was caused by a mechanical failure.

== Background ==
The layout of Atlanta Motor Speedway, the circuit where the race was held.

Atlanta International Raceway is a 1.522-mile race track in Hampton, Georgia, United States, 20 miles (32 km) south of Atlanta. It has annually hosted NASCAR Winston Cup Series stock car races since its inauguration in 1960.

The venue was bought by Speedway Motorsports in 1990. In 1994, 46 condominiums were built over the northeastern side of the track. In 1997, to standardize the track with Speedway Motorsports' other two intermediate ovals, the entire track was almost completely rebuilt. The frontstretch and backstretch were swapped, and the configuration of the track was changed from oval to quad-oval, with a new official length of 1.54-mile (2.48 km) where before it was 1.522-mile (2.449 km). The project made the track one of the fastest on the NASCAR circuit.

=== Entry list ===
- (R) - denotes rookie driver.

#	Driver	Team	Make	Sponsor
01	Mickey Gibbs (R)	Gibbs Racing	Ford	Gibbs–West Tractor
2	Ernie Irvan	U.S. Racing	Pontiac	Kroger
02	Rich Bickle	Bickle Racing	Buick	Alka-Seltzer
3	Dale Earnhardt	Richard Childress Racing	Chevrolet	GM Goodwrench Service Plus
4	Rick Wilson	Morgan–McClure Motorsports	Oldsmobile	Kodak
5	Geoff Bodine	Hendrick Motorsports	Chevrolet	Levi Garrett
6	Mark Martin	Roush Racing	Ford	Stroh's Light
7	Alan Kulwicki	AK Racing	Ford	Zerex
8	Bobby Hillin Jr.	Stavola Brothers Racing	Buick	Miller High Life
9	Bill Elliott	Melling Racing	Ford	Coors Light
10	Derrike Cope	Whitcomb Racing	Pontiac	Purolator
11	Terry Labonte	Junior Johnson & Associates	Ford	Budweiser
14	A. J. Foyt	A. J. Foyt Racing	Oldsmobile	Copenhagen
15	Brett Bodine	Bud Moore Engineering	Ford	Motorcraft
16	Larry Pearson (R)	Pearson Racing	Buick	Chattanooga Chew
17	Darrell Waltrip	Hendrick Motorsports	Chevrolet	Tide
20	Rob Moroso	Moroso Racing	Oldsmobile	Swisher Sweets
21	Neil Bonnett	Wood Brothers Racing	Ford	Citgo
22	Grant Adcox	Adcox Racing	Oldsmobile	Herb Adcox Chevrolet
23	Eddie Bierschwale	B&B Racing	Oldsmobile	B&B Racing
25	Ken Schrader	Hendrick Motorsports	Chevrolet	Folgers
26	Ricky Rudd	King Racing	Buick	Quaker State
27	Rusty Wallace	Blue Max Racing	Pontiac	Kodiak
28	Davey Allison	Robert Yates Racing	Ford	Texaco, Havoline
29	Dale Jarrett	Cale Yarborough Motorsports	Pontiac	Hardee's
30	Michael Waltrip	Bahari Racing	Pontiac	Country Time
33	Harry Gant	Jackson Bros. Motorsports	Oldsmobile	Skoal Bandit
42	Kyle Petty	SABCO Racing	Pontiac	Peak Antifreeze
43	Richard Petty	Petty Enterprises	Pontiac	STP
44	Jim Sauter	Group 44	Pontiac	Group 44
45	Patty Moise	Moise Racing	Buick	Amway Fuel Additive
47	Jack Pennington	Close Racing	Oldsmobile	Springsteen Properties
48	Greg Sacks	Winkle Motorsports	Pontiac	Dinner Bell Foods
52	Jimmy Means	Jimmy Means Racing	Pontiac	Alka-Seltzer
53	Jerry O'Neil	Aroneck Racing	Oldsmobile	Aroneck Racing
55	Phil Parsons	Jackson Bros. Motorsports	Oldsmobile	Skoal, Crown Central Petroleum
57	Hut Stricklin (R)	Osterlund Racing	Pontiac	Heinz
66	Rick Mast (R)	Mach 1 Racing	Chevrolet	Winn-Dixie
71	Dave Marcis	Marcis Auto Racing	Chevrolet	Lifebuoy
75	Morgan Shepherd	RahMoc Enterprises	Pontiac	Valvoline
77	Ken Ragan	Ragan Racing	Ford	Jasper Engines & Transmissions
83	Lake Speed	Speed Racing	Oldsmobile	Bull's-Eye Barbecue Sauce
84	Dick Trickle (R)	Stavola Brothers Racing	Buick	Miller High Life
88	Jimmy Spencer (R)	Baker–Schiff Racing	Pontiac	Crisco
89	Rodney Combs	Mueller Brothers Racing	Pontiac	Evinrude Outboard Motors
90	Tracy Leslie	Donlavey Racing	Ford	Donlavey Racing
94	Sterling Marlin	Hagan Racing	Oldsmobile	Sunoco

== Qualifying ==
Qualifying was split into two rounds. The first round was held on Friday, November 16, at 2:00 PM EST. Each driver would have one lap to set a time. During the first round, the top 20 drivers in the round would be guaranteed a starting spot in the race. If a driver was not able to guarantee a spot in the first round, they had the option to scrub their time from the first round and try and run a faster lap time in a second round qualifying run, held on Saturday, November 17, at 10:30 AM EST. As with the first round, each driver would have one lap to set a time. For this specific race, positions 21-40 would be decided on time, and depending on who needed it, a select amount of positions were given to cars who had not otherwise qualified but were high enough in owner's points; up to two were given.

Alan Kulwicki, driving for his own AK Racing team, would win the pole, setting a time of 30.591 and an average speed of 179.112 miles per hour (288.253 km/h) in the first round.

Five drivers would fail to qualify.

=== Full qualifying results ===
Pos.	#	Driver	Team	Make	Time	Speed
1	7	Alan Kulwicki	AK Racing	Ford	30.591	179.112
2	25	Ken Schrader	Hendrick Motorsports	Chevrolet	30.690	178.534
3	3	Dale Earnhardt	Richard Childress Racing	Chevrolet	30.818	177.792
4	27	Rusty Wallace	Blue Max Racing	Pontiac	30.864	177.527
5	11	Terry Labonte	Junior Johnson & Associates	Ford	30.889	177.384
6	94	Sterling Marlin	Hagan Racing	Oldsmobile	30.962	176.965
7	5	Geoff Bodine	Hendrick Motorsports	Chevrolet	30.976	176.885
8	17	Darrell Waltrip	Hendrick Motorsports	Chevrolet	31.034	176.555
9	84	Dick Trickle (R)	Stavola Brothers Racing	Buick	31.061	176.401
10	10	Derrike Cope	Whitcomb Racing	Pontiac	31.069	176.356
11	57	Hut Stricklin (R)	Osterlund Racing	Pontiac	31.085	176.265
12	48	Greg Sacks	Winkle Motorsports	Pontiac	31.089	176.242
13	9	Bill Elliott	Melling Racing	Ford	31.095	176.208
14	15	Brett Bodine	Bud Moore Engineering	Ford	31.110	176.123
15	20	Rob Moroso	Moroso Racing	Oldsmobile	31.162	175.830
16	42	Kyle Petty	SABCO Racing	Pontiac	31.180	175.728
17	66	Rick Mast (R)	Mach 1 Racing	Chevrolet	31.223	175.486
18	28	Davey Allison	Robert Yates Racing	Ford	31.251	175.329
19	88	Jimmy Spencer (R)	Baker–Schiff Racing	Pontiac	31.278	175.177
20	6	Mark Martin	Roush Racing	Ford	31.300	175.054
Failed to lock in Round 1
21	33	Harry Gant	Jackson Bros. Motorsports	Oldsmobile	31.039	176.526
22	83	Lake Speed	Speed Racing	Oldsmobile	31.083	176.276
23	2	Ernie Irvan	U.S. Racing	Pontiac	31.090	176.237
24	75	Morgan Shepherd	RahMoc Enterprises	Pontiac	31.186	175.694
25	01	Mickey Gibbs (R)	Gibbs Racing	Ford	31.228	175.458
26	21	Neil Bonnett	Wood Brothers Racing	Ford	31.258	175.290
27	77	Ken Ragan	Ragan Racing	Ford	31.279	175.172
28	4	Rick Wilson	Morgan–McClure Motorsports	Oldsmobile	31.395	174.525
29	8	Bobby Hillin Jr.	Stavola Brothers Racing	Buick	31.403	174.480
30	30	Michael Waltrip	Bahari Racing	Pontiac	31.428	174.341
31	14	A. J. Foyt	A. J. Foyt Racing	Oldsmobile	31.434	174.308
32	89	Rodney Combs	Mueller Brothers Racing	Pontiac	31.454	174.197
33	26	Ricky Rudd	King Racing	Buick	31.459	174.170
34	16	Larry Pearson (R)	Pearson Racing	Buick	31.474	174.087
35	43	Richard Petty	Petty Enterprises	Pontiac	31.483	174.037
36	44	Jim Sauter	Group 44	Pontiac	31.484	174.031
37	29	Dale Jarrett	Cale Yarborough Motorsports	Pontiac	31.516	173.855
38	22	Grant Adcox	Adcox Racing	Oldsmobile	31.566	173.579
39	47	Jack Pennington	Close Racing	Oldsmobile	31.597	173.409
40	02	Rich Bickle	Bickle Racing	Buick	31.605	173.365
Provisionals
41	55	Phil Parsons	Jackson Bros. Motorsports	Oldsmobile	-	-
42	71	Dave Marcis	Marcis Auto Racing	Chevrolet	-	-
Failed to qualify
43	23	Eddie Bierschwale	B&B Racing	Oldsmobile	-*	-*
44	53	Jerry O'Neil	Aroneck Racing	Oldsmobile	-*	-*
45	90	Tracy Leslie	Donlavey Racing	Ford	-*	-*
46	52	Jimmy Means	Jimmy Means Racing	Pontiac	-*	-*
47	45	Patty Moise	Moise Racing	Buick	-*	-*
Official first round qualifying results
Official starting lineup

== Race results ==
Fin	St	#	Driver	Team	Make	Laps	Led	Status	Pts	Winnings
1	3	3	Dale Earnhardt	Richard Childress Racing	Chevrolet	328	249	running	185	$81,700
2	7	5	Geoff Bodine	Hendrick Motorsports	Chevrolet	328	0	running	170	$33,625
3	6	94	Sterling Marlin	Hagan Racing	Oldsmobile	328	5	running	170	$25,275
4	2	25	Ken Schrader	Hendrick Motorsports	Chevrolet	328	38	running	165	$18,875
5	8	17	Darrell Waltrip	Hendrick Motorsports	Chevrolet	327	1	running	160	$18,800
6	16	42	Kyle Petty	SABCO Racing	Pontiac	326	0	running	150	$6,775
7	29	8	Bobby Hillin Jr.	Stavola Brothers Racing	Buick	326	0	running	146	$13,117
8	24	75	Morgan Shepherd	RahMoc Enterprises	Pontiac	326	0	running	142	$13,350
9	26	21	Neil Bonnett	Wood Brothers Racing	Ford	326	0	running	138	$8,950
10	22	83	Lake Speed	Speed Racing	Oldsmobile	326	0	running	134	$10,925
11	23	2	Ernie Irvan	U.S. Racing	Pontiac	325	0	running	130	$5,750
12	10	10	Derrike Cope	Whitcomb Racing	Pontiac	325	0	running	127	$5,450
13	1	7	Alan Kulwicki	AK Racing	Ford	325	0	running	124	$11,250
14	33	26	Ricky Rudd	King Racing	Buick	325	1	running	126	$10,350
15	4	27	Rusty Wallace	Blue Max Racing	Pontiac	325	0	running	118	$12,875
16	37	29	Dale Jarrett	Cale Yarborough Motorsports	Pontiac	324	0	running	115	$6,850
17	21	33	Harry Gant	Jackson Bros. Motorsports	Oldsmobile	324	0	running	112	$12,050
18	28	4	Rick Wilson	Morgan–McClure Motorsports	Oldsmobile	324	0	running	109	$6,250
19	34	16	Larry Pearson (R)	Pearson Racing	Buick	323	0	running	106	$4,700
20	11	57	Hut Stricklin (R)	Osterlund Racing	Pontiac	322	0	running	103	$4,875
21	36	44	Jim Sauter	Group 44	Pontiac	321	0	running	100	$2,550
22	40	02	Rich Bickle	Bickle Racing	Buick	319	0	running	97	$2,475
23	14	15	Brett Bodine	Bud Moore Engineering	Ford	310	0	running	94	$5,350
24	39	47	Jack Pennington	Close Racing	Oldsmobile	303	0	running	91	$2,325
25	18	28	Davey Allison	Robert Yates Racing	Ford	293	3	running	93	$11,350
26	30	30	Michael Waltrip	Bahari Racing	Pontiac	279	0	running	85	$5,075
27	13	9	Bill Elliott	Melling Racing	Ford	278	0	running	82	$13,150
28	35	43	Richard Petty	Petty Enterprises	Pontiac	268	0	a frame	79	$2,925
29	12	48	Greg Sacks	Winkle Motorsports	Pontiac	257	0	engine	76	$2,150
30	20	6	Mark Martin	Roush Racing	Ford	224	0	engine	73	$5,625
31	17	66	Rick Mast (R)	Mach 1 Racing	Chevrolet	213	0	engine	70	$2,050
32	38	22	Grant Adcox	Adcox Racing	Oldsmobile	198	0	crash (fatal)	67	$2,040
33	42	71	Dave Marcis	Marcis Auto Racing	Chevrolet	181	0	valve	64	$4,705
34	15	20	Rob Moroso	Moroso Racing	Oldsmobile	169	0	crash	61	$2,025
35	9	84	Dick Trickle (R)	Stavola Brothers Racing	Buick	138	29	engine	63	$4,750
36	31	14	A. J. Foyt	A. J. Foyt Racing	Oldsmobile	94	2	engine	60	$1,965
37	19	88	Jimmy Spencer (R)	Baker–Schiff Racing	Pontiac	66	0	crash	52	$4,575
38	25	01	Mickey Gibbs (R)	Gibbs Racing	Ford	37	0	engine	49	$1,935
39	27	77	Ken Ragan	Ragan Racing	Ford	35	0	brakes	46	$1,930
40	5	11	Terry Labonte	Junior Johnson & Associates	Ford	29	0	engine	43	$8,925
41	32	89	Rodney Combs	Mueller Brothers Racing	Pontiac	10	0	oil line	40	$1,925
42	41	55	Phil Parsons	Jackson Bros. Motorsports	Oldsmobile	8	0	engine	37	$4,525
Failed to qualify
43		23	Eddie Bierschwale	B&B Racing	Oldsmobile					
44		53	Jerry O'Neil	Aroneck Racing	Oldsmobile					
45		90	Tracy Leslie	Donlavey Racing	Ford					
46		52	Jimmy Means	Jimmy Means Racing	Pontiac					
47		45	Patty Moise	Moise Racing	Buick					
Official race results

== Standings after the race ==
Drivers' Championship standings

	Pos	Driver	Points
	1	Rusty Wallace	4,176
1	2	Dale Earnhardt	4,164 (-12)
1	3	Mark Martin	4,053 (-123)
	4	Darrell Waltrip	3,971 (–205)
1	5	Ken Schrader	3,786 (–390)
1	6	Bill Elliott	3,774 (–402)
1	7	Harry Gant	3,610 (–566)
1	8	Ricky Rudd	3,608 (–568)
1	9	Geoff Bodine	3,600 (–576)
3	10	Terry Labonte	3,554 (–612)
Official driver's standings

- Note: Only the first 10 positions are included for the driver standings.

Previous race: 1989 Autoworks 500	NASCAR Winston Cup Series; 1989 season	Next race: 1990 Daytona 500
