= Terri O'Connell =

- Born: James Terrell Hayes; July 7, 1964 (age 62); Corinth, Mississippi, U.S.

NASCAR Cup Series career
- 1 race run over 1 year
- Best finish: 101st (1990)
- First race: 1990 GM Goodwrench 500 (Rockingham)
Wins	Top tens	Poles
0	0	0

Terri Leigh O'Connell (born July 7, 1964) is an American former motorsports racing champion, artist, author, and fashion model.

== Life ==
Terri O'Connell was born on July 7, 1964, in Corinth, Mississippi. She is an only child.

O’Connell was named James Terrell Hayes at birth and lived the first thirty years of her life as a man, though she did not identify that way from a young age. Her father, Jimmy Hayes, got her into racing at an early age, spending weekends at the Riverside Speedway in West Memphis, Arkansas, and the Devil's Bowl in Dallas, Texas.

She won national championships in go-kart, midget car, and sprint car competitions across the country. She rose to compete in the NASCAR Winston Cup Series; driving the No. 91 Crossroads City of Corinth Ford Thunderbird for Donlavey Racing in 1990 at North Carolina Motor Speedway, now known as Rockingham Speedway; O'Connell has over five-hundred career victories.

In 1991, O’Connell was in a near-fatal accident while racing in Little Rock, Arkansas. From her 2007 Newsweek article, “I was trapped upside down, engine throttle stuck wide open, fuel running all over the racetrack and me. Once all the smoke had cleared and they got me out of the car, I thought, "You know, this could have been it." I've had a ton of accidents, broke half the bones in my body, had wrecks where I should have died. This one, I only busted a rib, but I was trapped like that. I suppose the accident didn't scare me as much as the thought that I hadn't lived my life to it's [sic] full potential.”

In 1992, O’Connell was living full-time as a woman, moved to California, and was working in a print shop, but in order to cover living expenses she would dress as a man to race. O’Connell moved back to her parents’ house in Mississippi and continued racing dressed as a man.

In March 1994, O’Connell had gender reassignment surgery, and in April moved to Charlotte, North Carolina. She kept ties with her racing roots but did not race for several years to heal from her surgery. In 1997, she began searching for sponsors for an Indy Racing League without luck. At the time, many denied this was due to her surgery and her being a woman including Junie Donlavey, owner of the team O’Connell had driven for in the Winston Cup race, who said it was due to the length of time she had been away from racing. Others like Shand Tillman, a promotor at the Riverside Speedway, said people were scared to associate their brand with her. Tillman also said that he did not “agree with what she has done at all” in reference to her transition, a reflection of the hyper-conservative landscape of racing. In 1998, she was slated to drive in the cross-country Cannonball Run for Volkswagen and Candies shoe company.

O’Connell has been able to return racing in the last couple decades, racing in 2012 and 2014 at Knoxville Raceway, and ran on a weekly basis in the 305 class in Scott Galpin's #71G in 2015.

Outside of racing, O'Connell, has worked as a model, owned a clothing line, and wrote a memoir, Dangerous Curves, which was published in 2008.

In 2007, Newsweek published an article by O'Connell, which led to interviews with LGBT magazines Advocate and Pride Source.

== Motorsports career results ==
=== NASCAR ===
(key) (Bold – Pole position awarded by qualifying time. Italics – Pole position earned by points standings or practice time. * – Most laps led.)

==== Winston Cup Series ====
NASCAR Winston Cup Series results
Year	Team	No.	Make	1	2	3	4	5	6	7	8	9	10	11	12	13	14	15	16	17	18	19	20	21	22	23	24	25	26	27	28	29	NWCC	Pts	Ref
1990	Donlavey Racing	91	Ford	DAY	RCH	CAR; 38	ATL	DAR	BRI	NWS	MAR	TAL	CLT	DOV	SON	POC	MCH	DAY	POC	TAL	GLN	MCH	BRI	DAR	RCH	DOV	MAR	NWS	CLT	CAR	PHO	ATL	101st	49	
