= Jack Pennington =

American racing driver (born 1953)

- Born: September 3, 1953 (age 73); Augusta, Georgia, U.S.
- Achievements: 1998 National 100 Winner; 1998 Blue-Gray 100 Winner
- Awards: National Dirt Late Model Hall of Fame (2006)

NASCAR Cup Series career
- 16 races run over 2 years
- Best finish: 34th (1990)
- First race: 1989 AC Delco 500 (Rockingham)
- Last race: 1990 Atlanta Journal 500 (Atlanta)
Wins	Top tens	Poles
0	0	0

NASCAR O'Reilly Auto Parts Series career
- 6 races run over 1 year
- Best finish: 47th (1989)
- First race: 1989 Goodwrench 200 (Rockingham)
- Last race: 1989 All Pro 300 (Charlotte)
Wins	Top tens	Poles
0	2	0
- Statistics up to date as of April 20, 2013.

Jack Pennington (born September 3, 1953) is an American dirt late model driver from Augusta, Georgia.

He was an ace in late model dirt track racing before he moved up to the Busch Series in 1989, making six starts, finishing with two top-tens. He made his Winston Cup debut late in 1989, driving two races that year. He then ran fourteen races in 1990 in the No. 47 Oldsmobile Cutlass Supreme for Close Racing. He led in the 1990 Daytona 500 at one point, leading six laps in the race. He was second in the 1990 Rookie of the Year standings in questionable situations since the winner was posthumously awarded after being killed in a drunk driving incident returning home from the September North Wilkesboro round with a .22 BAC, more than twice the legal limit. Under current rules, Pennington would have won Rookie of the year under a disciplinary rule. NASCAR has since imposed requiring drivers to finish the season in good standing. He never raced in NASCAR again after that year, returning to the Georgia dirt Late Model circuit, winning often over twenty features each year for the next decade.

He was inducted in the National Dirt Late Model Hall of Fame in 2006.

== Motorsports career results ==
=== NASCAR ===
(key) (Bold – Pole position awarded by qualifying time. Italics – Pole position earned by points standings or practice time. * – Most laps led.)

==== Winston Cup Series ====
NASCAR Winston Cup Series results
Year	Team	No.	Make	1	2	3	4	5	6	7	8	9	10	11	12	13	14	15	16	17	18	19	20	21	22	23	24	25	26	27	28	29	NWCC	Pts	Ref
1989	Close Racing	47	Olds	DAY	CAR	ATL	RCH	DAR	BRI	NWS	MAR	TAL	CLT	DOV	SON	POC	MCH	DAY	POC	TAL	GLN	MCH	BRI	DAR	RCH	DOV	MAR	CLT	NWS	CAR; 32	PHO		75th	91	
1989	Close Racing	47	Chevy																													ATL; 24	75th	91	
1990	Close Racing	47	Olds	DAY; 25	RCH	CAR	ATL; 30	DAR; 20	BRI	NWS	MAR	TAL; 11	CLT; 20	DOV	SON	POC; 21	MCH; 38	DAY; 18	POC	TAL; 23	GLN	MCH; 38	BRI	DAR; 22	RCH; DNQ	DOV	MAR	NWS; DNQ	CLT; 12	CAR; 24	PHO	ATL; 36	34th	1278	

===== Daytona 500 =====
Year	Team	Manufacturer	Start	Finish
1990	Close Racing	Oldsmobile	23	25

==== Busch Series ====
NASCAR Busch Series results
Year	Team	No.	Make	1	2	3	4	5	6	7	8	9	10	11	12	13	14	15	16	17	18	19	20	21	22	23	24	25	26	27	28	29	NBGNC	Pts	Ref
1989	Close Racing	01	Buick	DAY	CAR; 17	MAR	HCY	DAR; 39	BRI	NZH	SBO	LAN	NSV	CLT; 25	DOV; 23	ROU	LVL	VOL	MYB	SBO	HCY	DUB	IRP	ROU	BRI	DAR; 3	RCH	DOV	MAR	CLT; 4	CAR	MAR	47th	553	
