= Mike Alexander (racing driver) =

American racecar driver

Michael Clay Alexander
- Born: July 31, 1957 (age 69); Franklin, Tennessee, U.S.
- Achievements: 1984 All-American Challenge Series Champion; 1983 Grand Am Stock Car Series Champion; 2-time Nashville Speedway USA Track Champion
- Awards: Nashville Speedway USA Hall of Fame

NASCAR Cup Series career
- 74 races run over 7 years
- Best finish: 28th (1984)
- First race: 1980 Music City 420 (Nashville)
- Last race: 1990 First Union 400 North Wilkesboro)
Wins	Top tens	Poles
0	11	0

NASCAR O'Reilly Auto Parts Series career
- 71 races run over 6 years
- Best finish: 4th (1988)
- First race: 1983 Miller Time 300 (Charlotte)
- Last race: 1988 Winston Classic (Martinsville)
- First win: 1987 Hampton 200 (Langley)
- Last win: 1988 Mountain Dew 400 (Hickory)
Wins	Top tens	Poles
2	31	3
- Statistics up to date as of November 2, 2013.

Mike Alexander (born July 31, 1957) is an American former racing driver. He won the NASCAR Weekly Series national championship in 1983. He also raced in Winston Cup and in the Busch Series.

== Career before national racing ==
Alexander was the 1978 and 1992 track champion at the historic Nashville International Raceway, now known as Fairgrounds Speedway.

In 1983, driving Late Models on paved tracks for car owner Bobby Ray Jones, Alexander won the NASCAR Weekly Racing Series national championship, and won the NASCAR Grand American Stock Car championship in its final year. Alexander won 31 of the 56 races that he entered. Most were at Nashville, Tennessee or Birmingham, Alabama (where he won the track championship), but some ranged as far as South Carolina or Florida. He was born to a family well-known in the Nashville automotive scene who operated several area franchised dealerships.

2020 brought Alexander back to the Fairgrounds with ARCA driver Mason Mingus behind the wheel of the famed 84 throwback to the BRJ days in the 80’s. The two paired up with longtime Fairgrounds member Ben Pruitt and Mark Lawson. 2021 plans are the same as 2020 with Mingus driving and Alexander on top of the box.

== NASCAR career ==
=== Winston Cup Series ===
Alexander began his national-level racing career in the Winston Cup Series. He made the field in the Music City 420 in 1980 and performed fairly well, finishing tenth. He ran part of the 1981 season for Bob Rogers. Most of his finishes in 1981 were in the top-fifteen (if he was running). He ran most of the first 22 races in 1984 for car owner Dave Marcis with limited success. In 1985, he ran a partial schedule for Sims Brothers and Sadler Brothers. He drove for the Stavola Brothers for the final sixteen races in 1988, substituting for the injured Bobby Allison. He had his greatest success in 1988, with six top-ten finishes in eighteen starts, including a career best third place finish at the season finale at the Atlanta Motor Speedway. In 1989, Alexander drove the Stavola Brothers car at Daytona, but he was hampered by the effects of an injury in the Snowball Derby at Five Flags Speedway in Pensacola, FL the previous December, and resigned from the ride. His final stint in Cup was the first seven races for Bobby Allison Motorsports in 1990.

=== Busch Series ===
Alexander ran a partial season in the Busch Series in 1986. He ran full-time in 1987 and 1988, and had a win in both seasons (1987 Langley Speedway) and (1988 Hickory Motor Speedway). He had three career poles. He had 31 top-ten finishes in his 71 Busch starts.

== Motorsports career results ==
=== NASCAR ===
(key) (Bold – Pole position awarded by qualifying time. Italics – Pole position earned by points standings or practice time. * – Most laps led.)

==== Winston Cup Series ====
NASCAR Winston Cup Series results
Year	Team	No.	Make	1	2	3	4	5	6	7	8	9	10	11	12	13	14	15	16	17	18	19	20	21	22	23	24	25	26	27	28	29	30	31	NWCC	Pts	Ref
1980	Ulrich Racing	40	Chevy	RSD	DAY	RCH	CAR	ATL	BRI	DAR	NWS	MAR	TAL	NSV; 10	DOV	CLT	TWS	RSD	MCH	DAY	NSV	POC	TAL	MCH	BRI	DAR	RCH	DOV	NWS	MAR	CLT	CAR	ATL	ONT	NA	0	
1981	Rogers Racing	37	Olds	RSD	DAY	RCH	CAR; 13		BRI; 12	NWS; 11		MAR; 10			DOV; 21											DAR; 20									29th	1784	
1981	Rogers Racing	37	Buick					ATL; 33			DAR; 36		TAL; 21	NSV; 11		CLT; 27	TWS	RSD	MCH; 32	DAY; 7	NSV; 27	POC; 17	TAL; 35	MCH; 10	BRI; 25		RCH; 32	DOV	MAR	NWS	CLT	CAR			29th	1784	
1981	Gordon Racing	24	Buick																														ATL; DNQ	RSD	29th	1784	
1983	Zervakis Enterprises	01	Chevy	DAY	RCH	CAR	ATL	DAR	NWS	MAR	TAL	NSV	DOV	BRI	CLT	RSD	POC	MCH	DAY	NSV	POC	TAL	MCH	BRI	DAR	RCH	DOV	MAR; Wth	NWS	CLT	CAR	ATL	RSD		NA	-	
1984	Marcis Auto Racing	71	Olds	DAY; 21	RCH; 21	CAR; 11	ATL; 31	BRI; 29	NWS; 21	DAR; 32	MAR; 31	TAL; 17	NSV; 13	DOV	CLT; 16	RSD; 31	POC	MCH; 23	DAY; 22	NSV; 12	POC	TAL; 17	MCH; 24	BRI; 7	DAR; 34	RCH	DOV	MAR	CLT	NWS	CAR	ATL	RSD		28th	1862	
1985	Sims Brothers Racing	84	Chevy	DAY; 12	RCH	CAR	ATL; 34	BRI	DAR; 23	NWS	MAR; 29	TAL; 31	DOV	CLT; 24	RSD	POC	MCH	DAY; 13	POC	TAL															35th	1046	
1985	Sadler Brothers Racing	95	Chevy																		MCH; 13	BRI; 26	DAR	RCH	DOV	MAR	NWS; 26	CLT; 18	CAR	ATL	RSD				35th	1046	
1988	Stavola Brothers Racing	12	Buick	DAY	RCH	CAR	ATL	DAR	BRI	NWS	MAR	TAL	CLT	DOV	RSD	POC	MCH; 10	DAY; 15	POC; 15	TAL; 25	GLN; 5	MCH; 23	BRI; 18	DAR; 14	RCH; 17	DOV; 7	MAR; 29	CLT; 21	NWS; 9	CAR; 6	PHO; 27	ATL; 3			32nd	1931	
1989	Stavola Brothers Racing	84	Buick	DAY; 27	CAR	ATL	RCH	DAR	BRI	NWS	MAR	TAL	CLT	DOV	SON	POC	MCH	DAY	POC	TAL	GLN	MCH	BRI	DAR	RCH	DOV	MAR	CLT	NWS	CAR	PHO	ATL			81st	82	
1990	Bobby Allison Motorsports	12	Buick	DAY; 41	RCH; 14	CAR; 16	ATL; 23	DAR; 19	BRI; 23	NWS; 17	MAR	TAL	CLT	DOV	SON	POC	MCH	DAY	POC	TAL	GLN	MCH	BRI	DAR	RCH	DOV	MAR	NWS	CLT	CAR	PHO	ATL			38th	682	

===== Daytona 500 =====
Year	Team	Manufacturer	Start	Finish
1984	Marcis Auto Racing	Oldsmobile	42	21
1985	Sims Brothers Racing	Chevrolet	29	12
1989	Stavola Brothers Racing	Buick	22	27
1990	Bobby Allison Motorsports	Buick	15	41

==== Busch Series ====
NASCAR Busch Series results
Year	Team	No.	Make	1	2	3	4	5	6	7	8	9	10	11	12	13	14	15	16	17	18	19	20	21	22	23	24	25	26	27	28	29	30	31	32	33	34	35	NBSC	Pts	Ref
1983	Alexander Racing	84	Olds	DAY	RCH	CAR	HCY	MAR	NWS	SBO	GPS	LGY	DOV	BRI	CLT	SBO	HCY	ROU	SBO	ROU	CRW	ROU	SBO	HCY	LGY	IRP	GPS	BRI	HCY	DAR	RCH	NWS	SBO	MAR	ROU	CLT; 38	HCY	MAR	146th	49	
1984	Alexander Racing	84	Pontiac	DAY; 39	RCH	CAR	HCY	MAR	DAR	ROU	NSV	LGY	MLW	DOV	CLT	SBO	HCY	ROU	SBO	ROU	HCY	IRP	LGY	SBO	BRI	DAR	RCH	NWS	CLT	HCY	CAR	MAR							97th	46	
1985	Alexander Racing	84	Buick	DAY	CAR	HCY	BRI	MAR	DAR	SBO	LGY	DOV	CLT	SBO	HCY	ROU	IRP	SBO	LGY	HCY	MLW	BRI	DAR	RCH	NWS	ROU	CLT; 33	HCY	CAR	MAR									100th	-	
1986	Alexander Racing	84	Pontiac	DAY; 33	CAR; 11	HCY	MAR							CLT; 8													DAR; 11	RCH	DOV	MAR	ROU	CLT; 8	CAR	MAR					27th	1102	
1986	Alexander Racing	84	Chevy					BRI; 22	DAR	**SBO**; 18	LGY; 17	JFC	DOV		SBO; 21	HCY; 26	ROU	IRP; 14	SBO	RAL	OXF	SBO	HCY	LGY	ROU	BRI													27th	1102	
1987	Alexander Racing	84	Buick	DAY; 39	HCY; 2	MAR; 5	DAR; 23	BRI; 8	LGY; 1*	SBO; 20	CLT; 25	DOV; 12	**IRP**; 13*	ROU; 14	JFC; 2*	OXF; 44	SBO; 8	HCY; 2	RAL; 16	LGY; 6	ROU; 21		JFC; 3	DAR; 21	RCH; 6	DOV; 15	MAR; 4	CLT; 16	CAR; 40	MAR; 2									6th	3367	
1987	Alexander Racing	03	Pontiac																			BRI; 15																	6th	3367	
1988	Alexander Racing	84	Buick	DAY; 7	HCY; 1*	CAR; 2	MAR; 4	DAR; 11	BRI; 13	LNG; 9	NZH; 18	SBO; 2	NSV; 9	CLT; 9	**DOV**; 10*	ROU; 5	LAN; 5	LVL; 4	MYB; 20	OXF; 43	SBO; 20	HCY; 18	LNG; 8	IRP; 11	ROU; 2	BRI; 2	DAR; 7	RCH; 24	DOV; 22	MAR; 2	CLT; 26	CAR; 17	MAR; 22						4th	3966	

=== ARCA Talladega SuperCar Series ===
(key) (Bold – Pole position awarded by qualifying time. Italics – Pole position earned by points standings or practice time. * – Most laps led.)

ARCA Talladega SuperCar Series results
Year	Team	No.	Make	1	2	3	4	5	6	7	8	9	10	11	12	13	14	15	ATSS	Pts	Ref
1984	Sims Brothers Racing	96	Pontiac	DAY	ATL	TAL	CSP	SMS	FRS	MCS	LCS	IRP	TAL; 33	FRS	ISF	DSF	TOL	MGR	108th	-	
1985	Alexander Racing	84	Chevy	ATL	DAY	ATL	TAL	**ATL**; 2	SSP	IRP	CSP	FRS	IRP	OEF	ISF	DSF	TOL		72nd	-	
