= Rob Moroso =

American racing driver (1968–1990)

- Born: September 26, 1968; Madison, Connecticut, U.S.
- Died: September 30, 1990 (aged 22); Near Mooresville, North Carolina, U.S.
- Cause of death: Highway automobile crash
- Achievements: 1989 NASCAR Busch Series champion
- Awards: 1989 Busch Series Most Popular Driver; 1990 Winston Cup Series Rookie of the Year (posthumously)

NASCAR Cup Series career
- 29 races run over 3 years
- Best finish: 30th (1990)
- First race: 1988 Oakwood Homes 500 (Charlotte)
- Last race: 1990 Tyson Holly Farms 400 (North Wilkesboro)
Wins	Top tens	Poles
0	1	0

NASCAR O'Reilly Auto Parts Series career
- 86 races run over 4 years
- Best finish: 1st (1989)
- First race: 1986 Roses Stores 150 (Rougemont)
- Last race: 1989 Winston Classic (Martinsville)
- First win: 1988 Myrtle Beach 200 (Myrtle Beach)
- Last win: 1989 All Pro 300 (Charlotte)
Wins	Top tens	Poles
6	42	9
- Statistics up to date as of March 4, 2012.

Robert James Moroso (September 26, 1968 – September 30, 1990) was an American NASCAR racing driver who was champion of the NASCAR Busch Series (now O'Reilly Auto Parts Series) in 1989, and was posthumously awarded the 1990 NASCAR Winston Cup (now NASCAR Cup Series) Rookie of the Year award. A promising young driver, he and another driver were killed when Moroso was driving under the influence at excessive speeds on roads near his hometown of Terrell, North Carolina.

Born in Greenwich, Connecticut, he was the son of Dick Moroso, founder of Moroso Performance, suppliers of aftermarket automotive parts, and former owner of Moroso Motorsports Park in Jupiter, Florida.

== Early life ==
Moroso grew up in Madison, Connecticut, with two other siblings, Rick and Susan. His father was Richard D. "Dick" Moroso, who served as owner and sponsor for much of the younger Moroso's racing career.

After graduating from high school, Moroso enrolled in courses at Central Piedmont Community College in Charlotte, North Carolina, though he failed to complete them. He also attended the Buck Baker Racing School at Rockingham Speedway.

== Racing career ==
=== Busch Series ===
Moroso made his debut in the Busch Series at Orange County Speedway in North Carolina in 1986, two days after his eighteenth birthday. Driving the No. 23 Old Milwaukee Chevrolet, he qualified an impressive sixth, but finished 21st after suspension issues. He made his second start of the season in Rick Hendrick's No. 15 Chevrolet at Rockingham Speedway, finishing eighteenth. Moroso began running full-time in 1987, driving the No. 25 Oldsmobile owned by his father and sponsored by Moroso Performance. Moroso ran 25 of 27 races that season, with eight top tens and a fifteenth place points finish. 1988 was a breakout season for Moroso. He won his first career race in July 1988 at Myrtle Beach Speedway, at the age of nineteen, after out-dueling defending series champion Larry Pearson. He would score his second win of the season at Charlotte, and finished second in the final Busch series points to Tommy Ellis.

In 1989, Moroso was vying with veteran driver Tommy Houston for the championship in the final race of the year, at Martinsville Speedway. Houston's engine failed during the race, while Moroso finished third and won the title by 55 points over Houston. At the time Moroso was the youngest champion in the history of NASCAR at only 21 years of age. Moroso won a total of six races from 1988 to 1989, including three consecutive at Charlotte Motor Speedway, and was voted the most popular driver on the circuit.

=== Winston Cup Series ===
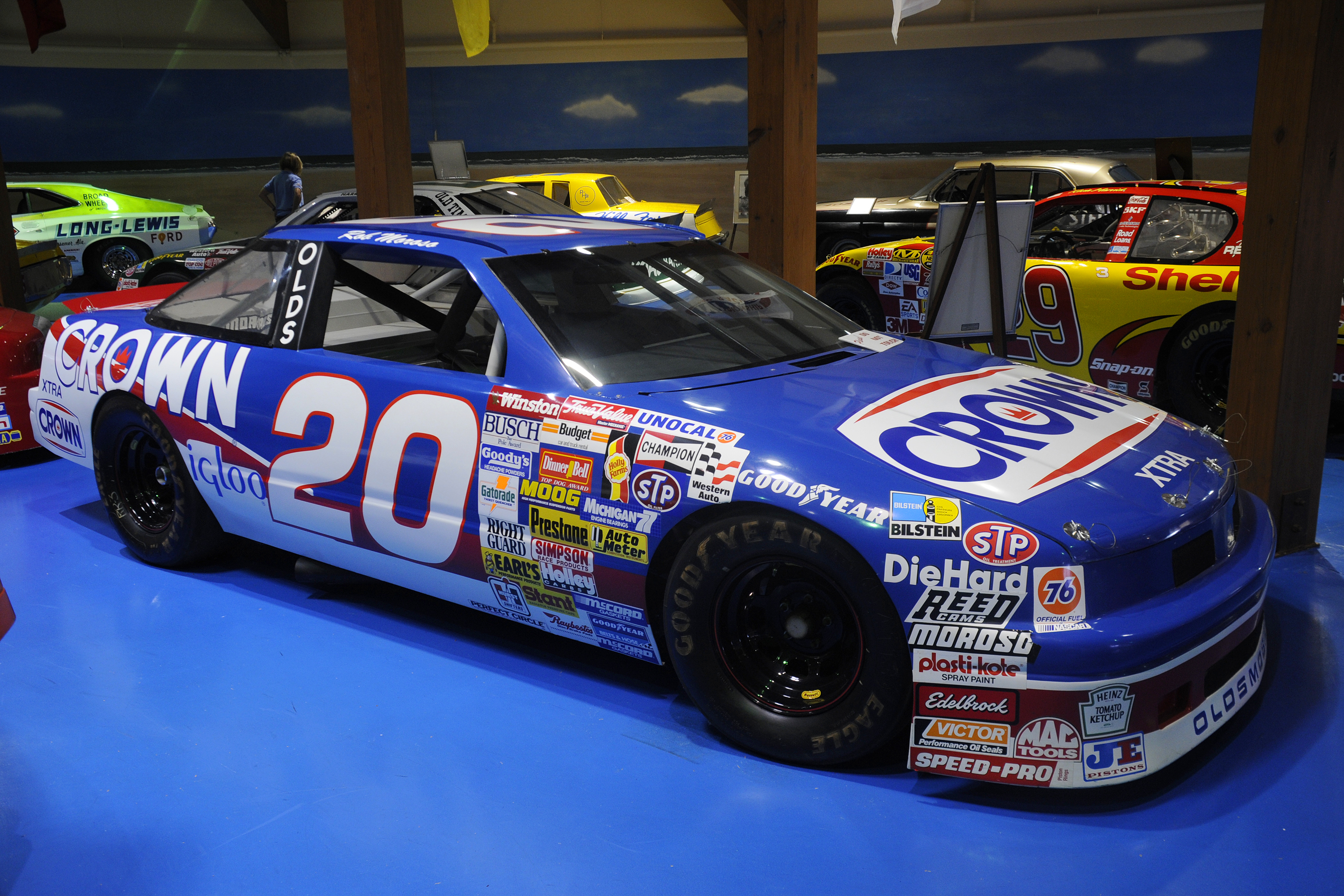
Moroso's 1990 Crown Oldsmobile on display at the International Motorsports Hall of Fame

Moroso made his debut in Winston Cup in 1988 at Charlotte in the No. 47 Peak Antifreeze Chevrolet for Hendrick Motorsports, finishing fourteenth. He would race one more time in 1988 and ran two races in 1989 as a warm up for the following season. Moroso declared he was running for Rookie of the Year in the 1990 season, driving the No. 20 Crown Central Petroleum Oldsmobile for his father. The highlight of the season was a ninth-place finish in the Pepsi Firecracker 400 at Daytona. Other than that, Moroso posted no wins, no top-fives, and only one top-ten and DNF'd in fifteen races.

== Death ==
On September 30, 1990, four days after his 22nd birthday, Moroso was killed in an automobile crash on North Carolina Highway 150 near Mooresville, North Carolina, only hours after finishing 21st in the Holly Farms 400 at North Wilkesboro Speedway. Traveling at an estimated 75 mph (121 km/h), Moroso lost control of his vehicle in a curve with a 35 mph (56 km/h) posted speed limit, skidding over 200 feet before being struck in the driver's side door by an oncoming car in the opposite lane. The resulting collision killed both Moroso and Tammy Williams, a 27-year-old nursing assistant, wife and mother who was driving in the opposite lane. The passenger in Moroso's vehicle, girlfriend Debbie Bryant, as well as a passenger in Williams' vehicle both survived with injuries.

Investigations revealed that he had been driving under the influence of alcohol. Moroso had been seen drinking several beers at a Cornelius, North Carolina, lounge prior to the crash, and his blood alcohol level was found to be 0.22, over twice the then legal level of 0.10. He also had been convicted of speeding four times between 1987 and 1989, and had been involved in two prior highway crashes which included a rollover. Judges could have revoked his license at least twice but the charges were reduced.

Moroso earned enough points after completing just 25 of 29 races that he was awarded the Raybestos NASCAR Rookie of the Year Award in 1990, the only driver to ever receive the award posthumously.

== Motorsports career results ==
=== NASCAR ===
(key) (Bold – Pole position awarded by qualifying time. Italics – Pole position earned by points standings or practice time. * – Most laps led.)

==== Winston Cup Series ====
NASCAR Winston Cup Series results
Year	Team	No.	Make	1	2	3	4	5	6	7	8	9	10	11	12	13	14	15	16	17	18	19	20	21	22	23	24	25	26	27	28	29	NWCC	Pts	Ref
1988	Hendrick Motorsports	47	Chevy	DAY	RCH	CAR	ATL	DAR	BRI	NWS	MAR	TAL	CLT	DOV	RSD	POC	MCH	DAY	POC	TAL	GLN	MCH	BRI	DAR	RCH	DOV	MAR	CLT; 14					54th	191	
1988	Moroso Racing	22	Olds																										NWS; 31	CAR	PHO	ATL	54th	191	
1989	Moroso Racing	22	Olds	DAY	CAR	ATL	RCH	DAR	BRI	NWS	MAR	TAL	CLT	DOV	SON	POC	MCH	DAY	POC	TAL	GLN	MCH	BRI	DAR	RCH	DOV; 28	MAR	CLT	NWS	CAR	PHO	ATL; 34	63rd	140	
1990	Moroso Racing	20	Olds	DAY; 38	RCH; 15	CAR; 30	ATL; 33	DAR; 26	BRI; 30	NWS; 32	MAR; 13	TAL; 37	CLT; 26	DOV; 29	SON; 42	POC; 36	MCH; 16	DAY; 9	POC; 32	TAL; 12	GLN; 13	MCH; 26	BRI; 30	DAR; 13	RCH; 28	DOV; 28	MAR; 21	NWS; 21	CLT	CAR	PHO	ATL	30th	2184	

===== Daytona 500 =====
Year	Team	Manufacturer	Start	Finish
1990	Moroso Racing	Oldsmobile	36	38

==== Busch Series ====
NASCAR Busch Series results
Year	Team	No.	Make	1	2	3	4	5	6	7	8	9	10	11	12	13	14	15	16	17	18	19	20	21	22	23	24	25	26	27	28	29	30	31	NBSC	Pts	Ref
1986		23	Olds	DAY	CAR	HCY	MAR	BRI	DAR	SBO	LGY	JFC	DOV	CLT	SBO	HCY	ROU	IRP	SBO	RAL	OXF	SBO	HCY	LGY	ROU	BRI	DAR	RCH	DOV	MAR	ROU; 21	CLT			59th	209	
1986	Hendrick Motorsports	15	Olds																														CAR; 18	MAR	59th	209	
1987	Moroso Racing	25	Olds	DAY; 15	HCY	MAR; 28	DAR; 16	BRI; 30	LGY; 19	SBO; 8	CLT; 28	DOV	IRP; 5	ROU; 8	JFC; 15	OXF; 5	SBO; 13	HCY; 16	RAL; 21	LGY; 13	ROU; 13	BRI; 7	JFC; 22	DAR; 36	RCH; 11	DOV; 9	MAR; 6	CLT; 7	CAR; 12	MAR; 24					15th	2949	
1988	Moroso Racing	25	Olds	DAY; 9	HCY; 10	CAR; 22	MAR; 3	DAR; 6	BRI; 4	LNG; 13	NZH; 2*	SBO; 7	NSV; 16	CLT; 4	DOV; 12	ROU; 4	LAN; 18	LVL; 20	MYB; 1	OXF; 40	**SBO**; 13*	**HCY**; 9	LNG; 6	IRP; 33	ROU; 3	BRI; 27	DAR; 8	RCH; 3	DOV; 34	MAR; 10	CLT; 1	CAR; 11	MAR; 2		2nd	3986	
1989	Moroso Racing	25	Olds	DAY; 3*	**CAR**; 1	**MAR**; 23	HCY; 3	DAR; 9	BRI; 6	NZH; 22	**SBO**; 4	LAN; 2	NSV; 18	CLT; 1	DOV; 17	ROU; 20	LVL; 9	**VOL**; 1*	MYB; 7*	SBO; 5	HCY; 28	**DUB**; 13	IRP; 14	**ROU**; 16	BRI; 22	DAR; 12	RCH; 4	DOV; 23	**MAR**; 2	CLT; 1	CAR; 12	MAR; 3			1st	4001	

==== Busch North Series ====
NASCAR Busch North Series results
Year	Team	No.	Make	1	2	3	4	5	6	7	8	9	10	11	12	13	14	15	16	17	18	19	20	21	22	23	NBNC	Pts	Ref
1987	n/a	n/a	n/a		OXF; 16																						n/a	n/a	

Preceded by Dick Trickle	NASCAR Rookie of the Year; 1990	Succeeded by Bobby Hamilton
Preceded by Tommy Ellis	NASCAR Busch Series Champion; 1989	Succeeded by Chuck Bown
