= Larry Pearson =

American racing driver (born 1953)

- Born: November 2, 1953 (age 73); Spartanburg, South Carolina, U.S.
- Achievements: 1986, 1987 Busch Series champion
- Awards: 1988 Busch Series Most Popular Driver

NASCAR Cup Series career
- 57 races run over 6 years
- Best finish: 23rd (1989)
- First race: 1986 Daytona 500 (Daytona)
- Last race: 1991 Hardee's 500 (Atlanta)
Wins	Top tens	Poles
0	3	0

NASCAR O'Reilly Auto Parts Series career
- 259 races run over 16 years
- Best finish: 1st (1986, 1987)
- First race: 1982 Mello Yello 300 (Charlotte)
- Last race: 1999 Textilease Medique 300 (South Boston)
- First win: 1984 Bobby Isaac Memorial 200 (Hickory)
- Last win: 1995 Carolina Pride/Red Dog 250 (Myrtle Beach)
Wins	Top tens	Poles
15	129	11
- Statistics up to date as of December 12, 2012.

Larry Pearson (born November 2, 1953) is an American former stock car racing driver and the son of three-time Winston Cup champion David Pearson. He won the Busch Series championship in 1986 and 1987, but struggled during his brief tenure in Winston Cup. His last ride in NASCAR came in the Busch Series in 1999, in the No. 00 Pontiac owned by Buckshot Racing. His Winston Cup statistics include 57 starts and three top-tens. His Busch statistics include 259 starts, fifteen wins, 78 top-fives, 129 top-tens, twelve poles, and six top-ten point finishes (including his two championships).

== 2010 injury ==
On March 20, 2010, Pearson was involved in a violent turn two crash with Charlie Glotzbach during a legends race at Bristol Motor Speedway, knocking him unconscious. Pearson regained consciousness before he was lifted out of the car on a backboard and transported by ambulance to a waiting helicopter that flew him to Bristol Regional Medical Center. Pearson suffered a fractured pelvis, fractured right hand, and compound fracture to his left ankle, and underwent surgery the night of March 20 to repair the ankle injury. Two days after the accident, he was released from the Bristol hospital and transported to Charlotte, North Carolina He was admitted into Carolinas Medical Center in fair condition.

== Motorsports career results ==
=== NASCAR ===
(key) (Bold – Pole position awarded by qualifying time. Italics – Pole position earned by points standings or practice time. * – Most laps led)

==== Winston Cup Series ====
NASCAR Winston Cup Series results
Year	Team	No.	Make	1	2	3	4	5	6	7	8	9	10	11	12	13	14	15	16	17	18	19	20	21	22	23	24	25	26	27	28	29	30	31	32	NWCC	Pts	Ref
1986	Pearson Racing	21	Chevy	DAY; 40	RCH	CAR	ATL	BRI	DAR	NWS	MAR	TAL	DOV	CLT	RSD	POC	MCH	DAY	POC	TAL	GLN	MCH	BRI	DAR	RCH	DOV	MAR	NWS	CLT; 12	CAR	ATL	RSD				79th	170	
1987	Pearson Racing	16	Chevy	DAY	CAR	RCH	ATL	DAR	NWS; 25	BRI	MAR	TAL	CLT; 31	DOV	POC	RSD	MCH	DAY	POC	TAL	GLN	MCH	BRI	DAR	RCH	DOV	MAR	NWS	CLT; 6	CAR	RSD	ATL; 25				51st	401	
1988	Pearson Racing	16	Chevy	DAY	RCH	CAR	ATL	DAR	BRI	NWS	MAR	TAL	CLT; DNQ	DOV	RSD	POC	MCH	DAY	POC	TAL	GLN	MCH	BRI	DAR	RCH	DOV	MAR	CLT; 41	NWS	CAR	PHO	ATL; 21				62nd	140	
1989	Pearson Racing	16	Buick	DAY; 14	CAR; 30	ATL; 22	RCH; 6	DAR; 20	BRI; 18	NWS; 24	MAR; 29	TAL; 29	CLT; 22	DOV; 19	SON; 19	POC; 9	MCH; 19	DAY; 30	POC; 40	TAL; 22	GLN; 11	MCH; 16	BRI; 21	DAR; 29	RCH; 20	DOV; 40	MAR; 25	CLT; 15	NWS; 24	CAR; 12	PHO; 24	ATL; 19				23rd	2860	
1990	Pearson Racing	16	Buick	DAY; 27	RCH; 23	CAR; 20	ATL; 34	DAR	BRI; DNQ	NWS	MAR	TAL																								35th	822	
1990	Edwards Racing	88	Pontiac										CLT; 42	DOV	SON	POC	MCH	DAY	POC	TAL	GLN	MCH														35th	822	
1990	Larry Hedrick Motorsports	41	Chevy																				BRI; 14	DAR; 17	RCH	DOV	MAR	NWS; DNQ	CLT; 19	CAR; 19	PHO	ATL				35th	822	
1991	Larry Hedrick Motorsports	41	Chevy	DAY	RCH	CAR	ATL	DAR	BRI	NWS; DNQ	MAR	TAL; 41	CLT; 41	DOV	SON	POC; 32	MCH; 20	DAY; 21	POC	TAL; 17	GLN	MCH	BRI; DNQ	DAR; 30	RCH; 36	DOV; 30	MAR	NWS	CLT; DNQ	CAR	PHO; 33	ATL; 14				37th	848	
1997	Bud Moore Engineering	15	Ford	DAY; DNQ	CAR	RCH	ATL	DAR	TEX	BRI	MAR	SON	TAL	CLT	DOV	POC	MCH	CAL	DAY	NHA	POC	IND	GLN	MCH	BRI	DAR	RCH	NHA	DOV	MAR	CLT	TAL	CAR	PHO	ATL	NA	-	

===== Daytona 500 =====
Year	Team	Manufacturer	Start	Finish
1986	Pearson Racing	Chevrolet	23	40
1989	Pearson Racing	Buick	14	14
1990	Pearson Racing	Buick	26	27
1997	Bud Moore Engineering	Ford	DNQ	

==== Busch Series ====
NASCAR Busch Series results
Year	Team	No.	Make	1	2	3	4	5	6	7	8	9	10	11	12	13	14	15	16	17	18	19	20	21	22	23	24	25	26	27	28	29	30	31	32	33	34	35	NBSC	Pts	Ref
1982	Pearson Racing	21	Pontiac	DAY	RCH	BRI	MAR	DAR	HCY	SBO	CRW	RCH	LGY	DOV	HCY	CLT; 14	ASH	HCY	SBO	CAR	CRW	SBO	HCY	LGY	IRP	BRI; 8	HCY	RCH	MAR	CLT; 8	HCY	MAR							61st	405	
1983	Pearson Racing	21	Pontiac	DAY; 9	RCH	CAR; 31	HCY	MAR	NWS	SBO	GPS	LGY	DOV	BRI	CLT	SBO	HCY	ROU	SBO	ROU	CRW	ROU	SBO; 10	HCY; 8	LGY	IRP	GPS; 8	BRI	HCY	DAR	RCH	NWS; 4	SBO	MAR; 24	ROU	**CLT**; 37	HCY	MAR	28th	929	
1984	Pearson Racing	21	Pontiac	DAY; 6	RCH; 9	CAR; 16	HCY; 4	MAR; 7	DAR; 10	ROU; 6	NSV; 7	LGY; 22	MLW	DOV	CLT; 12	SBO	HCY	ROU	SBO	ROU	HCY; 5	IRP	LGY	SBO	BRI; 10	DAR; 30	RCH	NWS	CLT	HCY; 1*		MAR; 21							18th	2005	
1984	Pearson Racing	52	Olds																												CAR; 7								18th	2005	
1985	Pearson Racing	21	Pontiac	DAY; 14	CAR; 22	HCY; 3	BRI; 5	MAR; 7	DAR; 20	SBO; 19	LGY; 5			SBO; 10	HCY; 1	ROU; 1*	IRP; 3	SBO; 18	LGY; 3	HCY; 2	MLW; 12	BRI; 3		RCH; 6	NWS; 2	ROU; 2		HCY; 3		MAR; 2									3rd	3951	
1985	Foushee Racing	55	Olds									DOV; 15																											3rd	3951	
1985	Pearson Racing	21	Chevy										CLT; 7										DAR; 5				CLT; 5		CAR; 18										3rd	3951	
1986	Pearson Racing	21	Pontiac	**DAY**; 41		HCY; 4	MAR; 2	BRI; 8		SBO; 2	LGY; 11	JFC; 12			SBO; 3	HCY; 7	ROU; 4	IRP; 2	SBO; 2		OXF; 18	SBO; 4	HCY; 6	LGY; 7	ROU; 12	BRI; 18		RCH; 4		MAR; 2	ROU; 1			MAR; 2					1st	4514	
1986	Pearson Racing	21	Chevy		CAR; 32				DAR; 10				DOV; 5	CLT; 5						RAL; 7							DAR; 7		DOV; 5			CLT; 3	CAR; 4						1st	4514	
1987	Pearson Racing	21	Chevy	DAY; 3			DAR; 11				CLT; 3	DOV; 2			JFC; 1		SBO; 1*	HCY; 8	RAL; 3	**LGY**; 10*	ROU; 1	BRI; 1	JFC; 1*	**DAR**; 26	**RCH**; 10	DOV; 2	MAR; 25	CLT; 36	CAR; 4	MAR; 5									1st	3959	
1987	Pearson Racing	21	Pontiac		HCY; 8	MAR; 25		BRI; 5	LGY; 11	SBO; 3*			IRP; 1	ROU; 4		OXF; 14																							1st	3959	
1988	Pearson Racing	21	Chevy	DAY; 30	HCY; 6	CAR; 35	**MAR**; 23	DAR; 7	**BRI**; 14*	LNG; 2	NZH; 22	SBO; 1*	NSV; 4	CLT; 39	DOV; 2	ROU; 2	**LAN**; 3	LVL; 19	MYB; 2	**OXF**; 29	SBO; 1	HCY; 5	LNG; 7	IRP; 4	**ROU**; 21	BRI; 1	DAR; 13	RCH; 2*	DOV; 12	MAR; 4	CLT; 22	CAR; 12	MAR; 20						3rd	3981	
1989	Pearson Racing	90	Buick	DAY	CAR	MAR	HCY	DAR	BRI	NZH	SBO	LAN	NSV	CLT	DOV	ROU	LVL	VOL	MYB	SBO; 6	HCY	DUB	IRP	ROU	BRI	DAR	RCH	DOV	MAR	CLT	CAR								102nd	-	
1989	Pearson Racing	16	Buick																													MAR; 11							102nd	-	
1990	Darrell Waltrip Motorsports	17	Chevy	DAY	RCH	CAR	MAR	HCY	DAR	BRI	LAN	SBO	NZH	HCY	CLT	DOV	ROU	VOL	MYB	OXF	NHA	SBO	DUB	IRP; 31	ROU	BRI	DAR	RCH	DOV	MAR	CLT	NHA	CAR	MAR					102nd	70	
1993	Martin Racing	92	Chevy	DAY; 35	CAR	RCH; 27	DAR; 8	BRI; 34	HCY	ROU; 2	MAR	NZH	CLT; 28	DOV; 6	MYB	GLN	MLW; 2	TAL; 27	IRP; 21	MCH; 12	NHA; 10	BRI	DAR	RCH	DOV; 29	ROU	CLT; 34	MAR	CAR	HCY	ATL; 2								25th	1662	
1994	Martin Racing	92	Chevy	DAY; 22	CAR; DNQ	RCH; 35	ATL; 2	MAR; 6	DAR; 2	HCY; 19	BRI; 6	ROU; 8	NHA; 7	NZH; 29	CLT; 19	DOV; 11	MYB; 10*	GLN; 9	MLW; 15	SBO; 20	TAL; 11	HCY; 5	IRP; 24	MCH; 9	BRI; 33	DAR; 7	RCH; 9	DOV; 22	CLT; 22	MAR; 12	CAR; 21								8th	3277	
1995	Martin Racing	92	Chevy	DAY; 25	CAR; 23	RCH; 34	ATL; 7	NSV; 5	DAR; 1	BRI; 20	HCY; 17	NHA; 10	NZH; 28	CLT; 23	DOV; 13	MYB; 1	GLN; 18	MLW; 2	TAL; 17	SBO; 4	IRP; 36	MCH; 22	BRI; 29	**DAR**; 17	RCH; 25	DOV; 16	CLT; 7	CAR; 11	HOM; 18										6th	3029	
1996	Martin Racing	92	Chevy	DAY; 4	CAR; 34	RCH; 26	ATL; 23	NSV; 11	DAR; 23	BRI; 22	HCY; 10	NZH; 16	CLT; 20	DOV; 9	SBO; 4	MYB; 28	GLN; 34	MLW; 29	NHA; 11	TAL; 34	IRP; 13	MCH; 33	BRI; 30	DAR; 37	RCH; 32														16th	2471	
1996	Martin Racing	92	Ford																							DOV; 27													16th	2471	
1996	ST Motorsports	46	Chevy																								CLT; 22	CAR; 27	HOM; 37										16th	2471	
1997	Porter Racing	48	Ford	DAY	CAR	RCH	ATL	LVS	DAR	HCY	TEX	BRI; 11																		CLT; 32	CAL	CAR	HOM						54th	555	
1997	Laughlin Racing	45	Chevy										NSV; 18	TAL	NHA	NZH																							54th	555	
1997	HVP Motorsports	63	Pontiac														CLT; 24	DOV	SBO	GLN	MLW																		54th	555	
1997	Key Motorsports	11	Ford																			MYB; 25	GTY	IRP; 31	MCH; DNQ	BRI	DAR	RCH	DOV										54th	555	
1998	Bobby Jones Racing	55	Pontiac	DAY; DNQ	CAR; 33	LVS	NSV	DAR	BRI	TEX	HCY																												71st	228	
1998	DAJ Racing	32	Ford	DAY; 32																																			71st	228	
1998	RC Racing	2	Chevy									TAL; 22	NHA	NZH	CLT	DOV	RCH	PPR	GLN	MLW	MYB	CAL	SBO	IRP	MCH	BRI	DAR	RCH	DOV	CLT	GTY	CAR	ATL	HOM					71st	228	
1999	Buckshot Racing	00	Pontiac	DAY; 25	CAR; 13	LVS; DNQ	ATL; 20	DAR; 23	TEX; 30	NSV	BRI; 30	TAL; 7	CAL; 27	NHA	RCH; 25	NZH; 30	CLT; DNQ	DOV	SBO; 25	GLN	MLW	MYB	PPR	GTY	IRP	MCH	BRI	DAR	RCH	DOV	CLT	CAR	MEM	PHO	HOM				49th	1032	

=== ARCA Talladega SuperCar Series ===
(key) (Bold – Pole position awarded by qualifying time. Italics – Pole position earned by points standings or practice time. * – Most laps led.)

ARCA Talladega SuperCar Series results
Year	Team	No.	Make	1	2	3	4	5	6	7	8	9	10	11	12	13	14	ATSSC	Pts	Ref
1985	Pearson Racing	21	Pontiac	ATL	DAY	ATL	TAL	ATL	SSP	IRP; 3	CSP	FRS						66th	-	
1985	N/A		Olds										IRP; 21	OEF	ISF	DSF	TOL	66th	-	

Sporting positions
Preceded by Jack Ingram	NASCAR Busch Series Champion; 1986, 1987	Succeeded by Tommy Ellis
