= 1988 Motorcraft Quality Parts 500 =

Fourth race of the 1988 NASCAR Winston Cup Series

Race details
- Race 4 of 29 in the 1988 NASCAR Winston Cup Series
- The 1988 Motorcraft Quality Parts 500 program cover, featuring Ricky Rudd.
- Date: March 20, 1988
- Official name: 29th Annual Motorcraft Quality Parts 500
- Location: Hampton, Georgia, Atlanta International Raceway
- Course: Permanent racing facility
- Course length: 1.522 miles (2.449 km)
- Distance: 328 laps, 499.216 mi (803.41 km)
- Average speed: 137.588 miles per hour (221.426 km/h)
- Attendance: 70,000

Pole position
Driver	Geoff Bodine	Hendrick Motorsports
- Time: 31.022

Most laps led
Driver	Dale Earnhardt	Richard Childress Racing
- Laps: 270

Winner
No. 3	Dale Earnhardt	Richard Childress Racing

Television in the United States
- Network: ABC
- Announcers: Keith Jackson, Jerry Punch

Radio in the United States
- Radio: Motor Racing Network

The 1988 Motorcraft Quality Parts 500 was the fourth stock car race of the 1988 NASCAR Winston Cup Series season and the 29th iteration of the event. The race was held on Sunday, March 20, 1988, before an audience of 70,000 in Hampton, Georgia, at Atlanta International Raceway, a 1.522 miles (2.449 km) permanent asphalt quad-oval intermediate speedway. The race took the scheduled 328 laps to complete. On the final restart of the race with three laps left in the race, Richard Childress Racing driver Dale Earnhardt would manage to pull away from the field, completing a dominant performance where he would lead 270 laps. The victory was Earnhardt's 32nd career NASCAR Winston Cup Series victory and his first victory of the season. To fill out the top three, Blue Max Racing driver Rusty Wallace and Hendrick Motorsports driver Darrell Waltrip would finish second and third, respectively.

== Background ==
The layout of Atlanta International Raceway, the circuit where the race was held.

Atlanta Motor Speedway (formerly Atlanta International Raceway) is a 1.522-mile race track in Hampton, Georgia, United States, 20 miles (32 km) south of Atlanta. It has annually hosted NASCAR Winston Cup Series stock car races since its inauguration in 1960.

The venue was bought by Speedway Motorsports in 1990. In 1994, 46 condominiums were built over the northeastern side of the track. In 1997, to standardize the track with Speedway Motorsports' other two intermediate ovals, the entire track was almost completely rebuilt. The frontstretch and backstretch were swapped, and the configuration of the track was changed from oval to quad-oval, with a new official length of 1.54-mile (2.48 km) where before it was 1.522-mile (2.449 km). The project made the track one of the fastest on the NASCAR circuit.

=== Entry list ===
- (R) - denotes rookie driver.

#	Driver	Team	Make
1	Dale Jarrett	Ellington Racing	Buick
01	Mickey Gibbs	Gibbs Racing	Ford
2	Ernie Irvan (R)	U.S. Racing	Chevrolet
3	Dale Earnhardt	Richard Childress Racing	Chevrolet
03	Dave Pletcher Sr.	Weaver Racing	Ford
4	Rick Wilson	Morgan–McClure Motorsports	Oldsmobile
5	Geoff Bodine	Hendrick Motorsports	Chevrolet
6	Mark Martin	Roush Racing	Ford
7	Alan Kulwicki	AK Racing	Ford
8	Bobby Hillin Jr.	Stavola Brothers Racing	Buick
9	Bill Elliott	Melling Racing	Ford
10	Ken Bouchard (R)	Whitcomb Racing	Ford
11	Terry Labonte	Junior Johnson & Associates	Chevrolet
12	Bobby Allison	Stavola Brothers Racing	Buick
14	A. J. Foyt	A. J. Foyt Racing	Oldsmobile
15	Brett Bodine	Bud Moore Engineering	Ford
17	Darrell Waltrip	Hendrick Motorsports	Chevrolet
21	Kyle Petty	Wood Brothers Racing	Ford
22	Steve Moore	Hamby Racing	Chevrolet
23	Eddie Bierschwale	B&B Racing	Chevrolet
25	Ken Schrader	Hendrick Motorsports	Chevrolet
26	Ricky Rudd	King Racing	Buick
27	Rusty Wallace	Blue Max Racing	Pontiac
28	Davey Allison	Ranier-Lundy Racing	Ford
29	Cale Yarborough	Cale Yarborough Motorsports	Oldsmobile
30	Michael Waltrip	Bahari Racing	Pontiac
31	Brad Teague	Bob Clark Motorsports	Oldsmobile
33	Harry Gant	Mach 1 Racing	Chevrolet
36	H. B. Bailey	Bailey Racing	Pontiac
43	Richard Petty	Petty Enterprises	Pontiac
44	Sterling Marlin	Hagan Racing	Oldsmobile
47	Morgan Shepherd	Shepherd Racing	Buick
48	Tony Spanos	Hylton Motorsports	Chevrolet
50	Greg Sacks	Dingman Brothers Racing	Pontiac
52	Jimmy Means	Jimmy Means Racing	Chevrolet
55	Phil Parsons	Jackson Bros. Motorsports	Oldsmobile
63	Jocko Maggiacomo	Linro Motorsports	Chevrolet
67	Buddy Arrington	Arrington Racing	Ford
68	Derrike Cope	Testa Racing	Ford
71	Dave Marcis	Marcis Auto Racing	Chevrolet
75	Neil Bonnett	RahMoc Enterprises	Pontiac
77	Ken Ragan	Ragan Racing	Ford
80	Jimmy Horton (R)	S&H Racing	Ford
83	Lake Speed	Speed Racing	Oldsmobile
86	Rick Jeffrey	Jeffrey Racing	Chevrolet
88	Buddy Baker	Baker–Schiff Racing	Oldsmobile
89	Jim Sauter	Mueller Brothers Racing	Pontiac
90	Benny Parsons	Donlavey Racing	Ford
92	David Sosebee	LC Racing	Ford
93	Charlie Baker	Salmon Racing	Chevrolet
97	Rodney Combs	Winkle Motorsports	Buick
98	Brad Noffsinger (R)	Curb Racing	Buick
99	Connie Saylor	Ball Motorsports	Chevrolet

== Qualifying ==
Qualifying was originally scheduled to be split into two rounds. The first round was scheduled to be held on Friday, March 18, at 3:00 PM EST. Originally, the first 20 positions were going to be determined by first round qualifying, with positions 21-40 meant to be determined the following day on Saturday, March 19. However, due to rain, the first round was cancelled. As a result, qualifying was condensed into one round for all starting grid spots in the race, which was run on Saturday. Depending on who needed it, a select amount of positions were given to cars who had not otherwise qualified but were high enough in owner's points; up to two were given.

Geoff Bodine, driving for Hendrick Motorsports, won the pole, setting a time of 31.022 and an average speed of 176.623 mph (284.247 km/h) in the first round.

11 drivers would fail to qualify.

=== Full qualifying results ===
Pos.	#	Driver	Team	Make	Time	Speed
1	5	Geoff Bodine	Hendrick Motorsports	Chevrolet	31.022	176.623
2	3	Dale Earnhardt	Richard Childress Racing	Chevrolet	31.139	175.959
3	9	Bill Elliott	Melling Racing	Ford	31.265	175.250
4	27	Rusty Wallace	Blue Max Racing	Pontiac	31.289	175.116
5	15	Brett Bodine	Bud Moore Engineering	Ford	31.342	174.820
6	14	A. J. Foyt	A. J. Foyt Racing	Oldsmobile	31.439	174.280
7	6	Mark Martin	Roush Racing	Ford	31.442	174.264
8	90	Benny Parsons	Donlavey Racing	Ford	31.467	174.125
9	25	Ken Schrader	Hendrick Motorsports	Chevrolet	31.499	173.948
10	17	Darrell Waltrip	Hendrick Motorsports	Chevrolet	31.503	173.926
11	44	Sterling Marlin	Hagan Racing	Oldsmobile	31.521	173.827
12	7	Alan Kulwicki	AK Racing	Ford	31.544	173.700
13	11	Terry Labonte	Junior Johnson & Associates	Chevrolet	31.553	173.651
14	83	Lake Speed	Speed Racing	Oldsmobile	31.566	173.579
15	55	Phil Parsons	Jackson Bros. Motorsports	Oldsmobile	31.607	173.354
16	30	Michael Waltrip	Bahari Racing	Pontiac	31.622	173.272
17	33	Harry Gant	Mach 1 Racing	Chevrolet	31.786	172.378
18	88	Buddy Baker	Baker–Schiff Racing	Oldsmobile	31.888	171.826
19	29	Cale Yarborough	Cale Yarborough Motorsports	Oldsmobile	31.914	171.687
20	47	Morgan Shepherd	Shepherd Racing	Buick	31.922	171.643
21	21	Kyle Petty	Wood Brothers Racing	Ford	31.954	171.471
22	8	Bobby Hillin Jr.	Stavola Brothers Racing	Buick	31.980	171.332
23	23	Eddie Bierschwale	B&B Racing	Oldsmobile	31.981	171.327
24	43	Richard Petty	Petty Enterprises	Pontiac	32.012	171.161
25	98	Brad Noffsinger (R)	Curb Racing	Buick	32.049	170.963
26	97	Rodney Combs	Winkle Motorsports	Buick	32.062	170.894
27	12	Bobby Allison	Stavola Brothers Racing	Buick	32.067	170.867
28	26	Ricky Rudd	King Racing	Buick	32.139	170.484
29	92	David Sosebee	LC Racing	Ford	32.164	170.352
30	77	Ken Ragan	Ragan Racing	Ford	32.165	170.347
31	75	Neil Bonnett	RahMoc Enterprises	Pontiac	32.191	170.209
32	4	Rick Wilson	Morgan–McClure Motorsports	Oldsmobile	32.197	170.177
33	71	Dave Marcis	Marcis Auto Racing	Chevrolet	32.201	170.156
34	2	Ernie Irvan (R)	U.S. Racing	Chevrolet	32.220	170.056
35	31	Brad Teague	Bob Clark Motorsports	Oldsmobile	32.221	170.051
36	68	Derrike Cope	Testa Racing	Ford	32.291	169.682
37	36	H. B. Bailey	Bailey Racing	Pontiac	32.291	169.682
38	89	Jim Sauter	Mueller Brothers Racing	Pontiac	32.483	168.679
39	52	Jimmy Means	Jimmy Means Racing	Pontiac	32.518	168.497
40	99	Dale Jarrett	Ball Motorsports	Chevrolet	32.547	168.347
Provisionals
41	28	Davey Allison	Ranier-Lundy Racing	Ford	32.603	168.058
42	10	Ken Bouchard (R)	Whitcomb Racing	Ford	32.713	167.493
Failed to qualify
43	67	Buddy Arrington	Arrington Racing	Ford	-*	-*
44	93	Charlie Baker	Salmon Racing	Chevrolet	-*	-*
45	01	Mickey Gibbs	Gibbs Racing	Ford	-*	-*
46	80	Jimmy Horton (R)	S&H Racing	Ford	-*	-*
47	1	Dale Jarrett	Ellington Racing	Buick	-*	-*
48	86	Rick Jeffrey	Jeffrey Racing	Chevrolet	-*	-*
49	63	Jocko Maggiacomo	Linro Motorsports	Chevrolet	-*	-*
50	22	Steve Moore	Hamby Racing	Chevrolet	-*	-*
51	03	Dave Pletcher Sr.	Weaver Racing	Ford	-*	-*
52	50	Greg Sacks	Dingman Brothers Racing	Pontiac	-*	-*
53	48	Tony Spanos	Hylton Motorsports	Buick	-*	-*
Official starting lineup

== Race results ==
Fin	St	#	Driver	Team	Make	Laps	Led	Status	Pts	Winnings
1	2	3	Dale Earnhardt	Richard Childress Racing	Chevrolet	328	270	running	185	$67,950
2	4	27	Rusty Wallace	Blue Max Racing	Pontiac	328	2	running	175	$37,875
3	10	17	Darrell Waltrip	Hendrick Motorsports	Chevrolet	327	2	running	170	$26,150
4	13	11	Terry Labonte	Junior Johnson & Associates	Chevrolet	327	2	running	165	$19,575
5	21	21	Kyle Petty	Wood Brothers Racing	Ford	327	1	running	160	$18,750
6	22	8	Bobby Hillin Jr.	Stavola Brothers Racing	Buick	326	0	running	150	$13,300
7	18	88	Buddy Baker	Baker–Schiff Racing	Oldsmobile	326	0	running	146	$13,650
8	9	25	Ken Schrader	Hendrick Motorsports	Chevrolet	326	0	running	142	$16,950
9	5	15	Brett Bodine	Bud Moore Engineering	Ford	326	0	running	138	$19,675
10	32	4	Rick Wilson	Morgan–McClure Motorsports	Oldsmobile	325	0	running	134	$11,825
11	27	12	Bobby Allison	Stavola Brothers Racing	Buick	325	2	running	135	$11,020
12	16	30	Michael Waltrip	Bahari Racing	Pontiac	322	0	running	127	$10,000
13	8	90	Benny Parsons	Donlavey Racing	Ford	322	44	running	129	$8,930
14	25	98	Brad Noffsinger (R)	Curb Racing	Buick	321	0	running	0	$5,310
15	33	71	Dave Marcis	Marcis Auto Racing	Chevrolet	320	3	running	123	$7,880
16	42	10	Ken Bouchard (R)	Whitcomb Racing	Ford	320	0	running	115	$5,520
17	23	23	Eddie Bierschwale	B&B Racing	Oldsmobile	319	0	running	112	$4,410
18	34	2	Ernie Irvan (R)	U.S. Racing	Chevrolet	318	0	running	109	$6,100
19	3	9	Bill Elliott	Melling Racing	Ford	312	0	crash	106	$11,940
20	11	44	Sterling Marlin	Hagan Racing	Oldsmobile	311	0	running	103	$7,770
21	17	33	Harry Gant	Mach 1 Racing	Chevrolet	296	0	running	100	$5,985
22	31	75	Neil Bonnett	RahMoc Enterprises	Pontiac	289	1	running	102	$9,600
23	24	43	Richard Petty	Petty Enterprises	Pontiac	285	0	engine	94	$5,615
24	28	26	Ricky Rudd	King Racing	Buick	253	0	engine	91	$5,430
25	38	89	Jim Sauter	Mueller Brothers Racing	Pontiac	238	0	cylinder head	88	$2,945
26	36	68	Derrike Cope	Testa Racing	Ford	194	0	running	85	$5,255
27	26	97	Rodney Combs	Winkle Motorsports	Buick	172	0	cylinder head	0	$3,095
28	29	92	David Sosebee	LC Racing	Ford	165	0	clutch	79	$2,210
29	40	99	Dale Jarrett	Ball Motorsports	Chevrolet	164	0	brakes	76	$2,175
30	20	47	Morgan Shepherd	Shepherd Racing	Buick	143	0	grease seal	73	$2,090
31	7	6	Mark Martin	Roush Racing	Ford	142	0	crash	70	$2,060
32	19	29	Cale Yarborough	Cale Yarborough Motorsports	Oldsmobile	127	0	brakes	67	$2,030
33	1	5	Geoff Bodine	Hendrick Motorsports	Chevrolet	109	1	engine	69	$8,725
34	6	14	A. J. Foyt	A. J. Foyt Racing	Oldsmobile	85	0	engine	61	$2,430
35	30	77	Ken Ragan	Ragan Racing	Ford	84	0	engine	58	$1,930
36	35	31	Brad Teague	Bob Clark Motorsports	Oldsmobile	80	0	crash	55	$1,905
37	15	55	Phil Parsons	Jackson Bros. Motorsports	Oldsmobile	71	0	crash	52	$4,585
38	14	83	Lake Speed	Speed Racing	Oldsmobile	49	0	cylinder head	49	$1,865
39	12	7	Alan Kulwicki	AK Racing	Ford	29	0	engine	46	$4,515
40	41	28	Davey Allison	Ranier-Lundy Racing	Ford	29	0	crash	43	$11,160
41	37	36	H. B. Bailey	Bailey Racing	Pontiac	12	0	oil leak	40	$1,760
42	39	52	Jimmy Means	Jimmy Means Racing	Pontiac	3	0	engine	37	$4,410
Official race results

== Standings after the race ==
Drivers' Championship standings

	Pos	Driver	Points
	1	Neil Bonnett	632
1	2	Dale Earnhardt	628 (-4)
1	3	Rusty Wallace	595 (-39)
2	4	Sterling Marlin	573 (–57)
4	5	Darrell Waltrip	561 (–71)
1	6	Bobby Allison	547 (–85)
6	7	Terry Labonte	543 (–89)
2	8	Buddy Baker	537 (–95)
1	9	Ken Schrader	534 (–98)
4	10	Bobby Hillin Jr.	516 (–116)
Official driver's standings

- Note: Only the first 10 positions are included for the driver standings.

Previous race: 1988 Goodwrench 500	NASCAR Winston Cup Series; 1988 season	Next race: 1988 TranSouth 500
