= Mickey Gibbs =

American racing driver (born 1958)

- Born: March 15, 1958 (age 68); Glencoe, Alabama, U.S.

NASCAR Cup Series career
- 36 races run over 4 years
- 1991 position: 34th
- Best finish: 34th (1991)
- First race: 1988 Goodwrench 500 (Rockingham)
- Last race: 1991 Pepsi 400 (Daytona)
Wins	Top tens	Poles
0	0	0

NASCAR O'Reilly Auto Parts Series career
- 1 race run over 1 year
- Best finish: 170th (1982)
- First race: 1982 Goody's 300 (Daytona)
Wins	Top tens	Poles
0	0	0

Mickey Gibbs (born March 15, 1958) is an American professional stock car racing driver from Alabama. Gibbs has won races in the ALL PRO Super Series, NASCAR All-American Challenge Series, American Speed Association, and ARCA ranks, along with the 1983 Snowball Derby before reaching the pinnacle of stock car racing, then known as the NASCAR Winston Cup Series. He is not related to highly successful NASCAR team owner Joe Gibbs.

== Climbing the Ladder ==
After making a lone start in the first race of the newly revamped Budweiser Late Model Sportsman Series, Gibbs was a regular in the ALL PRO Super Series in the early years of the series. He won a race for the first time in 1983 at the Birmingham International Raceway. He placed eighth in the championship. He also held off former Winston Cup race winner and fellow All PRO regular Jody Ridley in order to win that December's Snowball Derby, a race that also featured Bobby Allison, Rusty Wallace, and Gary Balough among other contemporary and future stars.

In 1985, Gibbs moved to the All-American Challenge Series. He would win five races and place fourth by points, behind Stanley Smith, Ronnie Sanders, and champion Dave Mader III. He would earn another win in 1986, despite not running all the races. Gibbs had a strong 1987 ALL PRO Series campaign. He won six races, including two more at Birmingham International Raceway (one of which also counted towards the ASA championship), but was not as consistent as champion Jody Ridley or second place Steve Grissom. Gibbs placed third in the season.

In 1988, Gibbs found success in the ARCA Permatex SuperCar Series. Holding off veteran racers Red Farmer and Charlie Glotzbach, Gibbs won the ARCA 200 at Daytona. He made five Winston Cup starts that year before winning the ARCA season finale at Atlanta, with a dominant performance that saw him defeat the new Busch Grand National champion Tommy Ellis and the new ARCA champ Tracy Leslie.

== Winston Cup Career ==
After winning the ARCA 200 at Daytona, Gibbs failed to qualify for the Daytona 500. His first Winston Cup start came at Rockingham, driving for his father Don Gibbs. He started 25th, but was relegated to 35th because of an engine failure just before halfway in the Goodwrench 500. He would miss the field again at Atlanta, but led briefly under caution at Talladega. His only finish among his five starts was at Michigan, where he finished 31st.

Gibbs began the 1989 season driving for Winkle Motorsports. After missing the Daytona 500 again, he took the green flag in Buddy Arrington's car. Though he finished twentieth at Rockingham for Winkle, he sat at 31st place in points after Atlanta and was dismissed from the team. Following his release from Winkle, he raced for both Dingman Brothers Racing and his father's team. The father-son duo's 1990 season began by missing Daytona, but that was followed by finishes of 19th at Richmond and 15th at Rockingham. In an abbreviated season, Gibbs attempted twelve races and started nine.

In 1991, Gibbs signed with Team III Racing, owned by Sam McMahon III, for the full season, with championship-winning crew chief Barry Dodson. His 17th place finish at Daytona yielded the biggest payday of his career (nearly $25,000). Gibbs also finished nineteenth at Talladega, and a career-best 14th at Sears Point and Michigan. Though he sat at 25th in points after the Pepsi 400 at Daytona, he was dismissed from Team III Racing. He was replaced by Dick Trickle and others to complete the season. Gibbs would not return to the Winston Cup Series.

== Final Races and Summary ==
Gibbs last racing exploits came during his return to ARCA, driving for Bobby Jones in 1992. He led 121 of 156 laps in a victory at Texas World Speedway. His last start came at Atlanta, but ended in a crash more than halfway through the race.

Gibbs competed in 36 Winston Cup races between 1988 and 1991, and one Budweiser Late Model Sportsman Series race. His success in the lower ranks included six wins in the All-American Challenge Series, seven ALL PRO Series wins (one of which doubled as an ASA win), three ARCA wins (including the 1988 Daytona 200), and the 1983 Snowball Derby.

== Motorsports career results ==
=== NASCAR ===
(key) (Bold – Pole position awarded by qualifying time. Italics – Pole position earned by points standings or practice time. * – Most laps led.)

==== Winston Cup Series ====
NASCAR Winston Cup Series results
Year	Team	No.	Make	1	2	3	4	5	6	7	8	9	10	11	12	13	14	15	16	17	18	19	20	21	22	23	24	25	26	27	28	29	NWCC	Pts	Ref
1988	Gibbs Racing	01	Ford	DAY; DNQ	RCH	CAR; 35	ATL; DNQ	DAR	BRI	NWS	MAR	TAL; 40	CLT	DOV	RSD	POC	MCH	DAY	POC	TAL; 34	GLN	MCH; 31	BRI	DAR	RCH	DOV	MAR	CLT; 39	NWS	CAR	PHO	ATL	50th	283	
1989	Winkle Motorsports	48	Pontiac	DAY; DNQ	CAR; 20	ATL; 39	RCH; 29	DAR	BRI	NWS	MAR	TAL; DNQ	CLT	DOV	SON	POC	MCH	DAY	POC														41st	508	
1989	Arrington Racing	67	Pontiac	DAY; 34																													41st	508	
1989	Dingman Brothers Racing	50	Pontiac																	TAL; 25	GLN							CLT; 26	NWS	CAR	PHO		41st	508	
1989	Gibbs Racing	01	Ford																			MCH; DNQ	BRI	DAR	RCH	DOV	MAR					ATL; 38	41st	508	
1990	Gibbs Racing	01	Ford	DAY; DNQ	RCH; 19	CAR; 15	ATL; 39	DAR; 38	BRI	NWS	MAR	TAL; 19	CLT; DNQ	DOV	SON	POC	MCH; DNQ	DAY; 32	POC	TAL; 22	GLN	MCH	BRI	DAR	RCH; 34	DOV	MAR	NWS	CLT; 21	CAR	PHO	ATL	37th	755	
1991	Team III Racing	24	Pontiac	DAY; 17	RCH; 23	CAR; 20	ATL; 25	DAR; 22	BRI; 19	NWS; 33	MAR; 25	TAL; 15	CLT; 34	DOV; 30	SON; 14	POC; 30	MCH; 14	DAY; 27	POC	TAL	GLN	MCH	BRI	DAR	RCH	DOV	MAR	NWS	CLT	CAR	PHO	ATL	34th	1401	

===== Daytona 500 =====
Year	Team	Manufacturer	Start	Finish
1988	Gibbs Racing	Ford	DNQ	
1989	Winkle Motorsports	Pontiac	DNQ	
1989	Arrington Racing	Pontiac	42	34
1990	Gibbs Racing	Ford	DNQ	
1991	Team III Racing	Pontiac	38	17
