= Dick Moroso =

American businessman

Richard D. Moroso (1939-November 7, 1998) was an American hot rodder, drag racer, and businessman.

Moroso was born in New Rochelle, New York and grew up in Old Greenwich, Connecticut. He started selling speed parts out of his family's basement in the early 1960s under the name Speed Associates. In the mid-1960s, Moroso and then partner Hank Dietrich opened Performance Automotive in Stamford.

Moroso founded Moroso Performance Products, to supply aftermarket automotive parts to fellow hot rodders, in 1968, the year his son, Rob, was born.

Moroso served as son Rob's owner and sponsor for much of his racing career.

Driving a 1961 Corvette, Moroso won one NHRA national title, in D/MP (D Modified Production), at the 1966 NHRA Nationals, held at Indianapolis Raceway Park. His winning pass was 13.32 seconds at 103.21 mph (166.10 km/h).

In 1981, Moroso purchased Palm Beach International Raceway, renaming it Moroso Motorsports Park. In 1982, Moroso spent $100,000 to upgrade the facility to host the opening event of the 1983 SCCA Trans Am Series.

In 1996, Moroso considered spending $2 million on a one-mile oval track for stock car racing, but those plans fell through.

Moroso died from brain cancer on November 7, 1998 in hospice care.

== Family ==
Moroso had a son, Rob, who raced in NASCAR before he was killed while driving at more than twice the blood/alcohol limit in 1990. Dick had other children, Rick, who currently runs the company, and a daughter, Susan.

== Sources ==
- Davis, Larry. Gasser Wars, North Branch, MN: Cartech, 2003, p. 185.
