= 1990 Busch 500 =

20th race of the 1990 NASCAR Winston Cup Series

Race details
- Race 20 of 29 in the 1990 NASCAR Winston Cup Series
- The 1990 Busch 500 program cover, featuring Darrell Waltrip.
- Date: August 25, 1990
- Official name: 30th Annual Busch 500
- Location: Bristol, Tennessee, Bristol International Speedway
- Course: Permanent racing facility
- Course length: 0.533 miles (0.858 km)
- Distance: 500 laps, 266.5 mi (428.89 km)
- Scheduled distance: 500 laps, 266.5 mi (428.89 km)
- Average speed: 91.782 miles per hour (147.709 km/h)
- Attendance: 58,200

Pole position
Driver	Dale Earnhardt	Richard Childress Racing
- Time: 16.598

Most laps led
Driver	Dale Earnhardt	Richard Childress Racing
- Laps: 350

Winner
No. 4	Ernie Irvan	Morgan-McClure Motorsports

Television in the United States
- Network: ESPN
- Announcers: Bob Jenkins, Ned Jarrett, Benny Parsons

Radio in the United States
- Radio: Motor Racing Network

The 1990 Busch 500 was the 20th stock car race of the 1990 NASCAR Winston Cup Series season and the 30th iteration of the event. The race was held on Saturday, August 25, 1990, before an audience of 58,200 in Bristol, Tennessee, at Bristol International Speedway, a 0.533 miles (0.858 km) permanent oval-shaped racetrack. The race took the scheduled 500 laps to complete. In the final laps of the race, Morgan–McClure Motorsports driver Ernie Irvan would manage to hold off Blue Max Racing driver Rusty Wallace to the finish to take his first career NASCAR Winston Cup Series victory and his only victory of the season. To fill out the top three, the aforementioned Rusty Wallace and Roush Racing driver Mark Martin would finish second and third, respectively.

== Background ==
The layout of Bristol Motor Speedway, the venue where the race was held.

The Bristol Motor Speedway, formerly known as Bristol International Raceway and Bristol Raceway, is a NASCAR short track venue located in Bristol, Tennessee. Constructed in 1960, it held its first NASCAR race on July 30, 1961. Despite its short length, Bristol is among the most popular tracks on the NASCAR schedule because of its distinct features, which include extraordinarily steep banking, an all concrete surface, two pit roads, and stadium-like seating. It has also been named one of the loudest NASCAR tracks.

=== Entry list ===
- (R) denotes rookie driver.

#	Driver	Team	Make
1	Terry Labonte	Precision Products Racing	Oldsmobile
3	Dale Earnhardt	Richard Childress Racing	Chevrolet
4	Ernie Irvan	Morgan–McClure Motorsports	Oldsmobile
5	Ricky Rudd	Hendrick Motorsports	Chevrolet
6	Mark Martin	Roush Racing	Ford
7	Alan Kulwicki	AK Racing	Ford
8	Bobby Hillin Jr.	Stavola Brothers Racing	Buick
9	Bill Elliott	Melling Racing	Ford
10	Derrike Cope	Whitcomb Racing	Chevrolet
11	Geoff Bodine	Junior Johnson & Associates	Ford
12	Hut Stricklin	Bobby Allison Motorsports	Buick
15	Morgan Shepherd	Bud Moore Engineering	Ford
17	Greg Sacks	Hendrick Motorsports	Chevrolet
19	Chad Little	Little Racing	Ford
20	Rob Moroso (R)	Moroso Racing	Oldsmobile
21	Dale Jarrett	Wood Brothers Racing	Ford
22	Rick Mast	U.S. Racing	Pontiac
25	Ken Schrader	Hendrick Motorsports	Chevrolet
26	Brett Bodine	King Racing	Buick
27	Rusty Wallace	Blue Max Racing	Pontiac
28	Davey Allison	Robert Yates Racing	Ford
30	Michael Waltrip	Bahari Racing	Pontiac
33	Harry Gant	Leo Jackson Motorsports	Oldsmobile
41	Larry Pearson	Larry Hedrick Motorsports	Chevrolet
42	Kyle Petty	SABCO Racing	Pontiac
43	Richard Petty	Petty Enterprises	Pontiac
52	Jimmy Means	Jimmy Means Racing	Pontiac
57	Jimmy Spencer	Osterlund Racing	Pontiac
66	Dick Trickle	Cale Yarborough Motorsports	Pontiac
70	J. D. McDuffie	McDuffie Racing	Pontiac
71	Dave Marcis	Marcis Auto Racing	Chevrolet
74	Mike Potter	Wawak Racing	Pontiac
75	Rick Wilson	RahMoc Enterprises	Pontiac
94	Sterling Marlin	Hagan Racing	Oldsmobile
98	Butch Miller	Travis Carter Enterprises	Chevrolet

== Qualifying ==
Qualifying was split into two rounds. The first round was held on Friday, August 23, at 7:35 PM EST. Each driver would have one lap to set a time. During the first round, the top 15 drivers in the round would be guaranteed a starting spot in the race. If a driver was not able to guarantee a spot in the first round, they had the option to scrub their time from the first round and try and run a faster lap time in a second round qualifying run, held on Saturday, August 24, at 1:00 PM EST. As with the first round, each driver would have one lap to set a time. For this specific race, positions 15-30 would be decided on time, and depending on who needed it, a select amount of positions were given to cars who had not otherwise qualified on time but were high enough in owner's points; up to two provisionals were given.

Dale Earnhardt, driving for Richard Childress Racing, would win the pole, setting a time of 16.598 and an average speed of 115.604 miles per hour (186.047 km/h) in the first round.

Two drivers would fail to qualify.

=== Full qualifying results ===
Pos.	#	Driver	Team	Make	Time	Speed
1	3	Dale Earnhardt	Richard Childress Racing	Chevrolet	16.598	115.604
2	6	Mark Martin	Roush Racing	Ford	16.641	115.306
3	66	Dick Trickle	Cale Yarborough Motorsports	Pontiac	16.764	114.460
4	27	Rusty Wallace	Blue Max Racing	Pontiac	16.771	114.412
5	42	Kyle Petty	SABCO Racing	Pontiac	16.775	114.385
6	4	Ernie Irvan	Morgan–McClure Motorsports	Chevrolet	16.782	114.337
7	5	Ricky Rudd	Hendrick Motorsports	Chevrolet	16.796	114.241
8	9	Bill Elliott	Melling Racing	Ford	16.818	114.092
9	21	Dale Jarrett	Wood Brothers Racing	Ford	16.829	114.017
10	7	Alan Kulwicki	AK Racing	Ford	16.832	113.997
11	11	Geoff Bodine	Junior Johnson & Associates	Ford	16.847	113.896
12	28	Davey Allison	Robert Yates Racing	Ford	16.882	113.660
13	94	Sterling Marlin	Hagan Racing	Oldsmobile	16.883	113.653
14	26	Brett Bodine	King Racing	Buick	16.893	113.586
15	10	Derrike Cope	Whitcomb Racing	Chevrolet	16.916	113.431
Failed to lock in Round 1
16	1	Terry Labonte	Precision Products Racing	Oldsmobile	16.918	113.418
17	20	Rob Moroso (R)	Moroso Racing	Oldsmobile	16.943	113.250
18	71	Dave Marcis	Marcis Auto Racing	Chevrolet	16.957	113.157
19	25	Ken Schrader	Hendrick Motorsports	Chevrolet	16.969	113.077
20	43	Richard Petty	Petty Enterprises	Pontiac	16.995	112.904
21	33	Harry Gant	Leo Jackson Motorsports	Oldsmobile	17.031	112.665
22	12	Hut Stricklin	Bobby Allison Motorsports	Buick	17.050	112.540
23	75	Rick Wilson	RahMoc Enterprises	Oldsmobile	17.056	112.500
24	22	Rick Mast	U.S. Racing	Pontiac	17.056	112.500
25	17	Greg Sacks	Hendrick Motorsports	Chevrolet	17.065	112.441
26	41	Larry Pearson	Larry Hedrick Motorsports	Chevrolet	17.082	112.329
27	30	Michael Waltrip	Bahari Racing	Pontiac	17.100	112.211
28	8	Bobby Hillin Jr.	Stavola Brothers Racing	Buick	17.117	112.099
29	15	Morgan Shepherd	Bud Moore Engineering	Ford	17.120	112.079
30	57	Jimmy Spencer	Osterlund Racing	Pontiac	17.148	111.896
Provisionals
31	98	Butch Miller	Travis Carter Enterprises	Chevrolet	-*	-*
32	52	Jimmy Means	Jimmy Means Racing	Pontiac	-*	-*
Failed to qualify
33	74	Mike Potter	Wawak Racing	Pontiac	-*	-*
34	19	Chad Little	Little Racing	Ford	-*	-*
35	70	J. D. McDuffie	McDuffie Racing	Pontiac	-*	-*
Official first round qualifying results

== Race results ==
Fin	St	#	Driver	Team	Make	Laps	Led	Status	Pts	Winnings
1	6	4	Ernie Irvan	Morgan–McClure Motorsports	Chevrolet	500	120	running	180	$49,600
2	4	27	Rusty Wallace	Blue Max Racing	Pontiac	500	0	running	170	$32,850
3	2	6	Mark Martin	Roush Racing	Ford	500	0	running	165	$22,830
4	16	1	Terry Labonte	Precision Products Racing	Oldsmobile	500	0	running	160	$14,150
5	13	94	Sterling Marlin	Hagan Racing	Oldsmobile	500	0	running	155	$12,900
6	10	7	Alan Kulwicki	AK Racing	Ford	500	0	running	150	$10,325
7	9	21	Dale Jarrett	Wood Brothers Racing	Ford	499	29	running	151	$9,850
8	1	3	Dale Earnhardt	Richard Childress Racing	Chevrolet	499	350	running	152	$30,125
9	27	30	Michael Waltrip	Bahari Racing	Pontiac	499	0	running	138	$9,157
10	7	5	Ricky Rudd	Hendrick Motorsports	Chevrolet	499	0	running	134	$10,100
11	11	11	Geoff Bodine	Junior Johnson & Associates	Ford	498	1	running	135	$11,750
12	19	25	Ken Schrader	Hendrick Motorsports	Chevrolet	497	0	running	127	$9,825
13	8	9	Bill Elliott	Melling Racing	Ford	497	0	running	124	$11,550
14	26	41	Larry Pearson	Larry Hedrick Motorsports	Chevrolet	497	0	running	121	$4,100
15	28	8	Bobby Hillin Jr.	Stavola Brothers Racing	Buick	496	0	running	118	$7,325
16	31	98	Butch Miller	Travis Carter Enterprises	Chevrolet	495	0	running	115	$5,600
17	3	66	Dick Trickle	Cale Yarborough Motorsports	Pontiac	494	0	running	112	$7,650
18	30	57	Jimmy Spencer	Osterlund Racing	Pontiac	493	0	running	109	$6,200
19	18	71	Dave Marcis	Marcis Auto Racing	Chevrolet	490	0	running	106	$6,050
20	25	17	Greg Sacks	Hendrick Motorsports	Chevrolet	485	0	running	103	$12,175
21	22	12	Hut Stricklin	Bobby Allison Motorsports	Buick	483	0	running	100	$4,275
22	32	52	Jimmy Means	Jimmy Means Racing	Pontiac	479	0	running	97	$4,175
23	12	28	Davey Allison	Robert Yates Racing	Ford	474	0	running	94	$10,350
24	24	22	Rick Mast	U.S. Racing	Pontiac	463	0	running	91	$3,375
25	14	26	Brett Bodine	King Racing	Buick	396	0	brakes	88	$5,575
26	21	33	Harry Gant	Leo Jackson Motorsports	Oldsmobile	395	0	running	85	$8,800
27	15	10	Derrike Cope	Whitcomb Racing	Chevrolet	379	0	rear end	82	$8,775
28	5	42	Kyle Petty	SABCO Racing	Pontiac	331	0	fatigue	79	$8,750
29	20	43	Richard Petty	Petty Enterprises	Pontiac	215	0	fatigue	76	$3,800
30	17	20	Rob Moroso (R)	Moroso Racing	Oldsmobile	188	0	accident	73	$3,900
31	29	15	Morgan Shepherd	Bud Moore Engineering	Ford	123	0	accident	70	$4,650
32	23	75	Rick Wilson	RahMoc Enterprises	Oldsmobile	122	0	engine	67	$4,650
Official race results

== Standings after the race ==
Drivers' Championship standings

	Pos	Driver	Points
	1	Mark Martin	3,019
	2	Dale Earnhardt	2,958 (-61)
	3	Geoff Bodine	2,835 (-184)
	4	Rusty Wallace	2,749 (–270)
1	5	Bill Elliott	2,596 (–423)
1	6	Morgan Shepherd	2,561 (–458)
1	7	Ricky Rudd	2,544 (–475)
1	8	Kyle Petty	2,530 (–489)
	9	Ken Schrader	2,488 (–531)
1	10	Ernie Irvan	2,412 (–607)
Official driver's standings

- Note: Only the first 10 positions are included for the driver standings.

Previous race: 1990 Champion Spark Plug 400	NASCAR Winston Cup Series; 1990 season	Next race: 1990 Heinz Southern 500
