= 1990 Hanes Activewear 500 =

Eighth race of the 1990 NASCAR Winston Cup Series

Race details
- Race 8 of 29 in the 1990 NASCAR Winston Cup Series
- The 1990 Hanes Activewear 500 program cover.
- Date: April 30, 1990
- Official name: 41st Annual Hanes Activewear 500
- Location: Martinsville, Virginia, Martinsville Speedway
- Course: Permanent racing facility
- Course length: 0.526 miles (0.847 km)
- Distance: 500 laps, 263 mi (423.257 km)
- Scheduled distance: 500 laps, 263 mi (423.257 km)
- Average speed: 77.423 miles per hour (124.600 km/h)
- Attendance: 43,500

Pole position
Driver	Geoff Bodine	Junior Johnson & Associates
- Time: 20.644

Most laps led
Driver	Geoff Bodine	Junior Johnson & Associates
- Laps: 270

Winner
No. 11	Geoff Bodine	Junior Johnson & Associates

Television in the United States
- Network: ESPN
- Announcers: Bob Jenkins, Ned Jarrett, Benny Parsons

Radio in the United States
- Radio: Motor Racing Network

The 1990 Hanes Activewear 500 was the eighth stock car race of the 1990 NASCAR Winston Cup Series season and the 41st iteration of the event. The race was held on Sunday, April 30, 1990, before an audience of 43,500 in Martinsville, Virginia at Martinsville Speedway, a 0.526 miles (0.847 km) permanent oval-shaped short track. The race took the scheduled 500 laps to complete. At race's end, Junior Johnson & Associates driver Geoff Bodine would manage to dominate the late stages of the race to take his eighth career NASCAR Winston Cup Series victory and his first victory of the season. To fill out the top three, Blue Max Racing driver Rusty Wallace and Bud Moore Engineering driver Morgan Shepherd would finish second and third, respectively.

== Background ==
The layout of Martinsville Speedway, the venue where the race was held.

Martinsville Speedway is a NASCAR-owned stock car racing track located in Henry County, in Ridgeway, Virginia, just to the south of Martinsville. At 0.526 miles (0.847 km) in length, it is the shortest track in the NASCAR Cup Series. The track was also one of the first paved oval tracks in NASCAR, being built in 1947 by H. Clay Earles. It is also the only remaining race track that has been on the NASCAR circuit from its beginning in 1948.

=== Entry list ===
- (R) denotes rookie driver.

#	Driver	Team	Make
1	Terry Labonte	Precision Products Racing	Oldsmobile
2	Rick Mast	U.S. Racing	Pontiac
3	Dale Earnhardt	Richard Childress Racing	Chevrolet
4	Ernie Irvan	Morgan–McClure Motorsports	Oldsmobile
5	Ricky Rudd	Hendrick Motorsports	Chevrolet
6	Mark Martin	Roush Racing	Ford
7	Alan Kulwicki	AK Racing	Ford
8	Bobby Hillin Jr.	Stavola Brothers Racing	Buick
9	Bill Elliott	Melling Racing	Ford
10	Derrike Cope	Whitcomb Racing	Chevrolet
11	Geoff Bodine	Junior Johnson & Associates	Ford
12	Jeff Purvis	Bobby Allison Motorsports	Buick
15	Morgan Shepherd	Bud Moore Engineering	Ford
17	Darrell Waltrip	Hendrick Motorsports	Chevrolet
20	Rob Moroso (R)	Moroso Racing	Oldsmobile
21	Dale Jarrett	Wood Brothers Racing	Ford
25	Ken Schrader	Hendrick Motorsports	Chevrolet
26	Brett Bodine	King Racing	Buick
27	Rusty Wallace	Blue Max Racing	Pontiac
28	Davey Allison	Robert Yates Racing	Ford
30	Michael Waltrip	Bahari Racing	Pontiac
33	Harry Gant	Leo Jackson Motorsports	Oldsmobile
42	Kyle Petty	SABCO Racing	Pontiac
43	Richard Petty	Petty Enterprises	Pontiac
52	Jimmy Means	Jimmy Means Racing	Pontiac
57	Jimmy Spencer	Osterlund Racing	Pontiac
66	Dick Trickle	Cale Yarborough Motorsports	Pontiac
71	Dave Marcis	Marcis Auto Racing	Chevrolet
75	Rick Wilson	RahMoc Enterprises	Oldsmobile
76	Bill Sedgwick	Spears Motorsports	Chevrolet
94	Sterling Marlin	Hagan Racing	Oldsmobile
98	Butch Miller	Travis Carter Enterprises	Chevrolet

== Qualifying ==
Qualifying was split into two rounds. The first round was held on Friday, April 27, at 3:00 PM EST. Each driver would have one lap to set a time. During the first round, the top 20 drivers in the round would be guaranteed a starting spot in the race. If a driver was not able to guarantee a spot in the first round, they had the option to scrub their time from the first round and try and run a faster lap time in a second round qualifying run, held on Saturday, April 28, at 12:30 PM EST. As with the first round, each driver would have one lap to set a time. For this specific race, positions 21-30 would be decided on time, and depending on who needed it, a select amount of positions were given to cars who had not otherwise qualified but were high enough in owner's points; up to two were given.

Geoff Bodine, driving for Junior Johnson & Associates, would win the pole, setting a time of 20.644 and an average speed of 91.726 miles per hour (147.619 km/h) in the first round.

No drivers would fail to qualify.

=== Full qualifying results ===
Pos.	#	Driver	Team	Make	Time	Speed
1	11	Geoff Bodine	Junior Johnson & Associates	Ford	20.644	91.726
2	3	Dale Earnhardt	Richard Childress Racing	Chevrolet	20.738	91.311
3	4	Ernie Irvan	Morgan–McClure Motorsports	Oldsmobile	20.802	91.030
4	6	Mark Martin	Roush Racing	Ford	20.810	90.995
5	21	Dale Jarrett	Wood Brothers Racing	Ford	20.909	90.564
6	25	Ken Schrader	Hendrick Motorsports	Chevrolet	20.927	90.486
7	17	Darrell Waltrip	Hendrick Motorsports	Chevrolet	20.946	90.404
8	26	Brett Bodine	King Racing	Buick	20.999	90.176
9	66	Dick Trickle	Cale Yarborough Motorsports	Pontiac	21.017	90.098
10	20	Rob Moroso (R)	Moroso Racing	Oldsmobile	21.074	89.855
11	5	Ricky Rudd	Hendrick Motorsports	Chevrolet	21.091	89.782
12	15	Morgan Shepherd	Bud Moore Engineering	Ford	21.096	89.761
13	9	Bill Elliott	Melling Racing	Ford	21.097	89.757
14	10	Derrike Cope	Whitcomb Racing	Chevrolet	21.105	89.723
15	42	Kyle Petty	SABCO Racing	Pontiac	21.128	89.625
16	1	Terry Labonte	Precision Products Racing	Oldsmobile	21.131	89.612
17	27	Rusty Wallace	Blue Max Racing	Pontiac	21.172	89.439
18	98	Butch Miller	Travis Carter Enterprises	Chevrolet	21.197	89.333
19	28	Davey Allison	Robert Yates Racing	Ford	21.224	89.220
20	7	Alan Kulwicki	AK Racing	Ford	21.234	89.178
Failed to lock in Round 1
21	57	Jimmy Spencer	Osterlund Racing	Pontiac	21.030	90.043
22	43	Richard Petty	Petty Enterprises	Pontiac	21.069	89.876
23	30	Michael Waltrip	Bahari Racing	Pontiac	21.159	89.494
24	76	Bill Sedgwick	Spears Motorsports	Chevrolet	21.179	89.409
25	94	Sterling Marlin	Hagan Racing	Oldsmobile	21.229	89.199
26	8	Bobby Hillin Jr.	Stavola Brothers Racing	Buick	21.256	89.085
27	33	Harry Gant	Leo Jackson Motorsports	Oldsmobile	21.280	88.985
28	71	Dave Marcis	Marcis Auto Racing	Chevrolet	21.290	88.943
29	75	Rick Wilson	RahMoc Enterprises	Oldsmobile	21.298	88.910
30	52	Jimmy Means	Jimmy Means Racing	Pontiac	21.329	88.781
Provisionals
31	12	Jeff Purvis	Bobby Allison Motorsports	Buick	21.330	88.776
32	2	Rick Mast	U.S. Racing	Pontiac	21.339	88.739
Official first round qualifying results
Official starting lineup

== Race results ==
Fin	St	#	Driver	Team	Make	Laps	Led	Status	Pts	Winnings
1	1	11	Geoff Bodine	Junior Johnson & Associates	Ford	500	270	running	185	$95,950
2	17	27	Rusty Wallace	Blue Max Racing	Pontiac	500	200	running	175	$36,800
3	12	15	Morgan Shepherd	Bud Moore Engineering	Ford	500	0	running	165	$19,750
4	7	17	Darrell Waltrip	Hendrick Motorsports	Chevrolet	500	6	running	165	$19,600
5	2	3	Dale Earnhardt	Richard Childress Racing	Chevrolet	499	21	running	160	$20,800
6	6	25	Ken Schrader	Hendrick Motorsports	Chevrolet	498	0	running	150	$12,875
7	4	6	Mark Martin	Roush Racing	Ford	498	0	running	146	$14,000
8	23	30	Michael Waltrip	Bahari Racing	Pontiac	497	0	running	142	$10,657
9	9	66	Dick Trickle	Cale Yarborough Motorsports	Pontiac	497	0	running	138	$10,800
10	13	9	Bill Elliott	Melling Racing	Ford	497	0	running	134	$14,925
11	21	57	Jimmy Spencer	Osterlund Racing	Pontiac	496	0	running	130	$8,085
12	8	26	Brett Bodine	King Racing	Buick	495	0	running	127	$7,100
13	10	20	Rob Moroso (R)	Moroso Racing	Oldsmobile	495	0	running	124	$5,050
14	28	71	Dave Marcis	Marcis Auto Racing	Chevrolet	495	0	running	121	$7,700
15	3	4	Ernie Irvan	Morgan–McClure Motorsports	Oldsmobile	490	0	running	118	$8,075
16	15	42	Kyle Petty	SABCO Racing	Pontiac	490	0	running	115	$9,200
17	14	10	Derrike Cope	Whitcomb Racing	Chevrolet	489	0	running	112	$7,600
18	18	98	Butch Miller	Travis Carter Enterprises	Chevrolet	485	0	running	109	$4,600
19	30	52	Jimmy Means	Jimmy Means Racing	Pontiac	484	0	running	106	$4,400
20	22	43	Richard Petty	Petty Enterprises	Pontiac	484	0	running	103	$4,875
21	26	8	Bobby Hillin Jr.	Stavola Brothers Racing	Buick	458	0	running	100	$5,300
22	19	28	Davey Allison	Robert Yates Racing	Ford	456	0	running	97	$8,550
23	11	5	Ricky Rudd	Hendrick Motorsports	Chevrolet	417	0	running	94	$5,100
24	24	76	Bill Sedgwick	Spears Motorsports	Chevrolet	359	0	running	91	$2,750
25	20	7	Alan Kulwicki	AK Racing	Ford	332	3	pump belt	93	$5,725
26	27	33	Harry Gant	Leo Jackson Motorsports	Oldsmobile	305	0	running	85	$8,250
27	29	75	Rick Wilson	RahMoc Enterprises	Oldsmobile	301	0	accident	82	$4,675
28	31	12	Jeff Purvis	Bobby Allison Motorsports	Buick	247	0	accident		$3,300
29	32	2	Rick Mast	U.S. Racing	Pontiac	246	0	transmission	76	$4,400
30	5	21	Dale Jarrett	Wood Brothers Racing	Ford	171	0	clutch	73	$4,050
31	16	1	Terry Labonte	Precision Products Racing	Oldsmobile	91	0	engine	70	$3,750
32	25	94	Sterling Marlin	Hagan Racing	Oldsmobile	12	0	camshaft	67	$3,750
Official race results

== Standings after the race ==
Drivers' Championship standings

	Pos	Driver	Points
	1	Dale Earnhardt	1,275
	2	Morgan Shepherd	1,223 (-52)
2	3	Geoff Bodine	1,131 (-144)
1	4	Mark Martin	1,125 (–150)
1	5	Darrell Waltrip	1,106 (–169)
2	6	Kyle Petty	1,073 (–202)
4	7	Rusty Wallace	1,071 (–204)
	8	Ken Schrader	1,052 (–223)
1	9	Bill Elliott	1,032 (–243)
1	10	Brett Bodine	1,028 (–247)
Official driver's standings

- Note: Only the first 10 positions are included for the driver standings.

Previous race: 1990 First Union 400	NASCAR Winston Cup Series; 1990 season	Next race: 1990 Winston 500
