= 1990 First Union 400 =

Seventh race of the 1990 NASCAR Winston Cup Series

Race details
- Race 7 of 29 in the 1990 NASCAR Winston Cup Series
- The 1990 First Union 400 program cover, featuring Dale Earnhardt.
- Date: April 22, 1990
- Official name: 40th Annual First Union 400
- Location: North Wilkesboro Speedway, North Wilkesboro, North Carolina
- Course: Permanent racing facility
- Course length: 0.625 miles (1.006 km)
- Distance: 400 laps, 250 mi (402.336 km)
- Scheduled distance: 400 laps, 250 mi (402.336 km)
- Average speed: 83.908 miles per hour (135.037 km/h)

Pole position
| Driver | Mark Martin | Roush Racing |

Most laps led
| Driver | Brett Bodine | King Racing |
- Laps: 146

Winner
| No. 26 | Brett Bodine | King Racing |

Television in the United States
- Network: ESPN
- Announcers: Bob Jenkins, Ned Jarrett, Benny Parsons

Radio in the United States
- Radio: Motor Racing Network

The 1990 First Union 400 was the seventh stock car race of the 1990 NASCAR Winston Cup Series season and the 40th iteration of the event. The race was held on Sunday, April 22, 1990, in North Wilkesboro, North Carolina at the North Wilkesboro Speedway, a 0.625 miles (1.006 km) oval short track. The race took the scheduled 400 laps to complete. At the race's end, King Racing driver Brett Bodine would benefit from a late race caution and pull away in the late stages of the race to take his first and only career NASCAR Winston Cup Series victory and his only victory of the season. To fill out the podium, Hendrick Motorsports driver Darrell Waltrip and Richard Childress Racing driver Dale Earnhardt would finish second and third, respectively.

The race would become controversial after a late race caution came out for Kenny Wallace during the last round of green flag pit stops. Many had thought that when the pace car had come out, and the leaders had raced to the caution, that Dale Earnhardt was in the lead. However, after NASCAR officials had spent more than 20 laps sorting out the restart order, they determined that Brett Bodine was in the lead. Bodine would then cruise to his only victory of his career. Despite numerous protests from competitors, the victory still remains official to this day.

== Background ==
The layout of North Wilkesboro Speedway, the venue where the race was held.

North Wilkesboro Speedway is a short oval racetrack located on U.S. Route 421, about five miles east of North Wilkesboro, North Carolina, or 80 miles north of Charlotte. It measures 0.625 mi (1.006 km) and features a unique uphill backstretch and downhill frontstretch. It has previously held races in NASCAR's top three series, including 93 Winston Cup Series races. The track, a NASCAR original, operated from 1949, NASCAR's inception, until the track's original closure in 1996. The speedway briefly reopened in 2010 and hosted several stock car series races before closing again in the spring of 2011. It was reopened in August 2022 for grassroots racing.

=== Entry list ===
- (R) denotes rookie driver.

| # | Driver | Team | Make |
|---|---|---|---|
| 1 | Terry Labonte | Precision Products Racing | Oldsmobile |
| 2 | Rick Mast | U.S. Racing | Chevrolet |
| 3 | Dale Earnhardt | Richard Childress Racing | Chevrolet |
| 4 | Ernie Irvan | Morgan–McClure Motorsports | Oldsmobile |
| 5 | Ricky Rudd | Hendrick Motorsports | Chevrolet |
| 6 | Mark Martin | Roush Racing | Ford |
| 7 | Alan Kulwicki | AK Racing | Ford |
| 8 | Bobby Hillin Jr. | Stavola Brothers Racing | Buick |
| 9 | Bill Elliott | Melling Racing | Ford |
| 10 | Derrike Cope | Whitcomb Racing | Chevrolet |
| 11 | Geoff Bodine | Junior Johnson & Associates | Ford |
| 12 | Mike Alexander | Bobby Allison Motorsports | Buick |
| 15 | Morgan Shepherd | Bud Moore Engineering | Ford |
| 17 | Darrell Waltrip | Hendrick Motorsports | Chevrolet |
| 20 | Rob Moroso (R) | Moroso Racing | Oldsmobile |
| 21 | Dale Jarrett | Wood Brothers Racing | Ford |
| 25 | Ken Schrader | Hendrick Motorsports | Chevrolet |
| 26 | Brett Bodine | King Racing | Buick |
| 27 | Rusty Wallace | Blue Max Racing | Pontiac |
| 28 | Davey Allison | Robert Yates Racing | Ford |
| 30 | Michael Waltrip | Bahari Racing | Pontiac |
| 33 | Harry Gant | Mach 1 Racing | Oldsmobile |
| 36 | Kenny Wallace | Randy Hope Motorsports | Pontiac |
| 42 | Kyle Petty | SABCO Racing | Pontiac |
| 43 | Richard Petty | Petty Enterprises | Pontiac |
| 48 | Freddie Crawford | James Hylton Motorsports | Chevrolet |
| 52 | Jimmy Means | Jimmy Means Racing | Pontiac |
| 57 | Jimmy Spencer | Osterlund Racing | Pontiac |
| 66 | Dick Trickle | Cale Yarborough Motorsports | Pontiac |
| 70 | J. D. McDuffie | McDuffie Racing | Pontiac |
| 71 | Dave Marcis | Marcis Auto Racing | Chevrolet |
| 75 | Rick Wilson | RahMoc Enterprises | Oldsmobile |
| 76 | Bill Sedgwick | Spears Motorsports | Chevrolet |
| 94 | Sterling Marlin | Hagan Racing | Oldsmobile |
| 98 | Butch Miller | Travis Carter Enterprises | Chevrolet |

== Qualifying ==
Qualifying was split into two rounds. The first round was held on Friday, April 20, at 3:00 PM EST. Each driver would have one lap to set a time. During the first round, the top 10 drivers in the round would be guaranteed a starting spot in the race. If a driver was not able to guarantee a spot in the first round, they had the option to scrub their time from the first round and try and run a faster lap time in a second round qualifying run, held on Saturday, April 21, at 12:15 PM EST. As with the first round, each driver would have one lap to set a time.

Mark Martin, driving for Roush Racing, would win the pole, setting a time of 19.153 and an average speed of 117.475 miles per hour (189.058 km/h).

Three drivers would fail to qualify: J. D. McDuffie, Bill Sedgwick, and Freddie Crawford.

=== Full qualifying results ===
| Pos. | # | Driver | Team | Make | Time | Speed |
|---|---|---|---|---|---|---|
| 1 | 6 | Mark Martin | Roush Racing | Ford | 19.153 | 117.475 |
| 2 | 11 | Geoff Bodine | Junior Johnson & Associates | Ford | 19.181 | 117.304 |
| 3 | 66 | Dick Trickle | Cale Yarborough Motorsports | Pontiac | 19.192 | 117.236 |
| 4 | 3 | Dale Earnhardt | Richard Childress Racing | Chevrolet | 19.207 | 117.145 |
| 5 | 42 | Kyle Petty | SABCO Racing | Pontiac | 19.232 | 116.993 |
| 6 | 25 | Ken Schrader | Hendrick Motorsports | Chevrolet | 19.248 | 116.895 |
| 7 | 17 | Darrell Waltrip | Hendrick Motorsports | Chevrolet | 19.257 | 116.841 |
| 8 | 5 | Ricky Rudd | Hendrick Motorsports | Chevrolet | 19.270 | 116.762 |
| 9 | 4 | Ernie Irvan | Morgan–McClure Motorsports | Oldsmobile | 19.291 | 116.635 |
| 10 | 7 | Alan Kulwicki | AK Racing | Ford | 19.298 | 116.592 |
Failed to lock in Round 1
| 11 | 75 | Rick Wilson | RahMoc Enterprises | Oldsmobile | 19.351 | 116.273 |
| 12 | 1 | Terry Labonte | Precision Products Racing | Oldsmobile | 19.361 | 116.213 |
| 13 | 9 | Bill Elliott | Melling Racing | Ford | 19.374 | 116.135 |
| 14 | 94 | Sterling Marlin | Hagan Racing | Oldsmobile | 19.385 | 116.069 |
| 15 | 57 | Jimmy Spencer | Osterlund Racing | Pontiac | 19.393 | 116.021 |
| 16 | 21 | Dale Jarrett | Wood Brothers Racing | Ford | 19.398 | 115.991 |
| 17 | 28 | Davey Allison | Robert Yates Racing | Ford | 19.406 | 115.944 |
| 18 | 71 | Dave Marcis | Marcis Auto Racing | Chevrolet | 19.408 | 115.932 |
| 19 | 30 | Michael Waltrip | Bahari Racing | Pontiac | 19.422 | 115.848 |
| 20 | 26 | Brett Bodine | King Racing | Buick | 19.440 | 115.741 |
| 21 | 15 | Morgan Shepherd | Bud Moore Engineering | Ford | 19.444 | 115.717 |
| 22 | 27 | Rusty Wallace | Blue Max Racing | Pontiac | 19.445 | 115.711 |
| 23 | 43 | Richard Petty | Petty Enterprises | Pontiac | 19.450 | 115.681 |
| 24 | 20 | Rob Moroso (R) | Moroso Racing | Oldsmobile | 19.465 | 115.592 |
| 25 | 52 | Jimmy Means | Jimmy Means Racing | Pontiac | 19.491 | 115.438 |
| 26 | 10 | Derrike Cope | Whitcomb Racing | Chevrolet | 19.499 | 115.391 |
| 27 | 33 | Harry Gant | Mach 1 Racing | Oldsmobile | 19.523 | 115.249 |
| 28 | 36 | Kenny Wallace | Randy Hope Motorsports | Pontiac | 19.570 | 114.972 |
| 29 | 2 | Rick Mast | U.S. Racing | Chevrolet | 19.591 | 114.849 |
| 30 | 98 | Butch Miller | Travis Carter Enterprises | Chevrolet | 19.603 | 114.778 |
| 31 | 8 | Bobby Hillin Jr. | Stavola Brothers Racing | Buick | 19.678 | 114.341 |
| 32 | 12 | Mike Alexander | Bobby Allison Motorsports | Buick | 19.775 | 113.780 |
Failed to qualify
| 33 | 70 | J. D. McDuffie | McDuffie Racing | Pontiac | -* | -* |
| 34 | 76 | Bill Sedgwick | Spears Motorsports | Chevrolet | -* | -* |
| 35 | 48 | Freddie Crawford | James Hylton Motorsports | Chevrolet | -* | -* |
Official first round qualifying results
Official qualifying results

*Time not available.

== Race results ==
| Fin | St | # | Driver | Team | Make | Laps | Led | Status | Pts | Winnings |
|---|---|---|---|---|---|---|---|---|---|---|
| 1 | 20 | 26 | Brett Bodine | King Racing | Buick | 400 | 146 | running | 185 | $50,682 |
| 2 | 7 | 17 | Darrell Waltrip | Hendrick Motorsports | Chevrolet | 400 | 79 | running | 175 | $31,625 |
| 3 | 4 | 3 | Dale Earnhardt | Richard Childress Racing | Chevrolet | 400 | 72 | running | 170 | $21,775 |
| 4 | 8 | 5 | Ricky Rudd | Hendrick Motorsports | Chevrolet | 400 | 0 | running | 160 | $12,775 |
| 5 | 21 | 15 | Morgan Shepherd | Bud Moore Engineering | Ford | 400 | 0 | running | 155 | $12,100 |
| 6 | 1 | 6 | Mark Martin | Roush Racing | Ford | 400 | 103 | running | 155 | $18,975 |
| 7 | 22 | 27 | Rusty Wallace | Blue Max Racing | Pontiac | 400 | 0 | running | 146 | $12,825 |
| 8 | 2 | 11 | Geoff Bodine | Junior Johnson & Associates | Ford | 400 | 0 | running | 142 | $10,075 |
| 9 | 17 | 28 | Davey Allison | Robert Yates Racing | Ford | 400 | 0 | running | 138 | $8,600 |
| 10 | 5 | 42 | Kyle Petty | SABCO Racing | Pontiac | 399 | 0 | running | 134 | $10,850 |
| 11 | 10 | 7 | Alan Kulwicki | AK Racing | Ford | 399 | 0 | running | 130 | $6,675 |
| 12 | 18 | 71 | Dave Marcis | Marcis Auto Racing | Chevrolet | 399 | 0 | running | 127 | $6,350 |
| 13 | 27 | 33 | Harry Gant | Mach 1 Racing | Oldsmobile | 399 | 0 | running | 124 | $8,050 |
| 14 | 16 | 21 | Dale Jarrett | Wood Brothers Racing | Ford | 399 | 0 | running | 121 | $5,975 |
| 15 | 12 | 1 | Terry Labonte | Precision Products Racing | Oldsmobile | 398 | 0 | running | 118 | $6,325 |
| 16 | 9 | 4 | Ernie Irvan | Morgan–McClure Motorsports | Oldsmobile | 398 | 0 | running | 115 | $5,675 |
| 17 | 32 | 12 | Mike Alexander | Bobby Allison Motorsports | Buick | 397 | 0 | running | 112 | $4,125 |
| 18 | 13 | 9 | Bill Elliott | Melling Racing | Ford | 397 | 0 | running | 109 | $9,100 |
| 19 | 6 | 25 | Ken Schrader | Hendrick Motorsports | Chevrolet | 397 | 0 | running | 106 | $7,800 |
| 20 | 15 | 57 | Jimmy Spencer | Osterlund Racing | Pontiac | 396 | 0 | running | 103 | $6,025 |
| 21 | 26 | 10 | Derrike Cope | Whitcomb Racing | Chevrolet | 393 | 0 | running | 100 | $7,675 |
| 22 | 11 | 75 | Rick Wilson | RahMoc Enterprises | Oldsmobile | 384 | 0 | running | 97 | $5,000 |
| 23 | 29 | 2 | Rick Mast | U.S. Racing | Chevrolet | 384 | 0 | running | 94 | $6,925 |
| 24 | 3 | 66 | Dick Trickle | Cale Yarborough Motorsports | Pontiac | 372 | 0 | engine | 91 | $8,600 |
| 25 | 30 | 98 | Butch Miller | Travis Carter Enterprises | Chevrolet | 333 | 0 | running | 88 | $3,350 |
| 26 | 28 | 36 | Kenny Wallace | Randy Hope Motorsports | Pontiac | 315 | 0 | crash | 85 | $2,550 |
| 27 | 19 | 30 | Michael Waltrip | Bahari Racing | Pontiac | 309 | 0 | transmission | 82 | $4,675 |
| 28 | 25 | 52 | Jimmy Means | Jimmy Means Racing | Pontiac | 306 | 0 | oil cooler | 79 | $3,100 |
| 29 | 23 | 43 | Richard Petty | Petty Enterprises | Pontiac | 201 | 0 | crash | 76 | $2,475 |
| 30 | 31 | 8 | Bobby Hillin Jr. | Stavola Brothers Racing | Buick | 183 | 0 | crash | 73 | $3,925 |
| 31 | 14 | 94 | Sterling Marlin | Hagan Racing | Oldsmobile | 150 | 0 | crash | 70 | $3,925 |
| 32 | 24 | 20 | Rob Moroso (R) | Moroso Racing | Oldsmobile | 9 | 0 | crash | 67 | $3,175 |
Failed to qualify
| 33 | | 70 | J. D. McDuffie | McDuffie Racing | Pontiac | | | | | |
| 34 | | 76 | Bill Sedgwick | Spears Motorsports | Chevrolet | | | | | |
| 35 | | 48 | Freddie Crawford | James Hylton Motorsports | Chevrolet | | | | | |
Official race results

== Standings after the race ==
Drivers' Championship standings

| | Pos | Driver | Points |
|---|---|---|---|
| | 1 | Dale Earnhardt | 1,115 |
| | 2 | Morgan Shepherd | 1,058 (-57) |
| 1 | 3 | Mark Martin | 979 (-136) |
| 1 | 4 | Kyle Petty | 958 (–157) |
| | 5 | Geoff Bodine | 946 (–169) |
| 2 | 6 | Darrell Waltrip | 941 (–174) |
| 4 | 7 | Ricky Rudd | 908 (–207) |
| 2 | 8 | Ken Schrader | 902 (–213) |
| 6 | 9 | Brett Bodine | 901 (–214) |
| 3 | 10 | Bill Elliott | 898 (–217) |
Official driver's standings

- Note: Only the first 10 positions are included for the driver standings.

| Previous race: 1990 Valleydale Meats 500 | NASCAR Winston Cup Series; 1990 season | Next race: 1990 Hanes Activewear 500 |
