= 1990 Valleydale Meats 500 =

Sixth race of the 1990 NASCAR Winston Cup Series

Race details
- Race 6 of 29 in the 1990 NASCAR Winston Cup Series
- The 1990 Valleydale Meats 500 program cover, featuring Rusty Wallace.
- Date: April 8, 1990
- Official name: 30th Annual Valleydale Meats 500
- Location: Bristol, Tennessee, Bristol Motor Speedway
- Course: Permanent racing facility
- Course length: 0.533 miles (0.858 km)
- Distance: 500 laps, 266.5 mi (428.89 km)
- Scheduled distance: 500 laps, 266.5 mi (428.89 km)
- Average speed: 87.258 miles per hour (140.428 km/h)
- Attendance: 57,800

Pole position
Driver	Ernie Irvan	Morgan-McClure Motorsports
- Time: 16.519

Most laps led
Driver	Darrell Waltrip	Hendrick Motorsports
- Laps: 167

Winner
No. 28	Davey Allison	Robert Yates Racing

Television in the United States
- Network: ESPN
- Announcers: Bob Jenkins, Ned Jarrett, Benny Parsons

Radio in the United States
- Radio: Motor Racing Network

The 1990 Valleydale Meats 500 was the sixth stock car race of the 1990 NASCAR Winston Cup Series season and the 30th iteration of the event. The race was held on Sunday, April 8, 1990, before an audience of 57,800 in Bristol, Tennessee, at Bristol Motor Speedway, a 0.533 miles (0.858 km) permanent oval-shaped racetrack. The race took the scheduled 500 laps to complete. In the final laps of the race, Robert Yates Racing driver Davey Allison would manage to best out Roush Racing driver Mark Martin by a margin of 8 inches (20 cm) at the finish of the race to take his seventh career NASCAR Winston Cup Series victory and his first victory of the season. To fill out the top three, Hendrick Motorsports driver Ricky Rudd would finish third.

== Background ==
The layout of Bristol Motor Speedway, the venue where the race was held.

The Bristol Motor Speedway, formerly known as Bristol International Raceway and Bristol Raceway, is a NASCAR short track venue located in Bristol, Tennessee. Constructed in 1960, it held its first NASCAR race on July 30, 1961. Despite its short length, Bristol is among the most popular tracks on the NASCAR schedule because of its distinct features, which include extraordinarily steep banking, an all concrete surface, two pit roads, and stadium-like seating. It has also been named one of the loudest NASCAR tracks.

=== Entry list ===
- (R) denotes rookie driver.

#	Driver	Team	Make
1	Terry Labonte	Precision Products Racing	Oldsmobile
2	Rick Mast	U.S. Racing	Pontiac
3	Dale Earnhardt	Richard Childress Racing	Chevrolet
4	Ernie Irvan	Morgan–McClure Motorsports	Oldsmobile
5	Ricky Rudd	Hendrick Motorsports	Chevrolet
6	Mark Martin	Roush Racing	Ford
7	Alan Kulwicki	AK Racing	Ford
8	Bobby Hillin Jr.	Stavola Brothers Racing	Buick
9	Bill Elliott	Melling Racing	Ford
10	Derrike Cope	Whitcomb Racing	Chevrolet
11	Geoff Bodine	Junior Johnson & Associates	Ford
12	Mike Alexander	Bobby Allison Motorsports	Buick
15	Morgan Shepherd	Bud Moore Engineering	Ford
16	Larry Pearson	Pearson Racing	Buick
17	Darrell Waltrip	Hendrick Motorsports	Chevrolet
19	Chad Little	Little Racing	Ford
20	Rob Moroso (R)	Moroso Racing	Oldsmobile
21	Dale Jarrett	Wood Brothers Racing	Ford
25	Ken Schrader	Hendrick Motorsports	Chevrolet
26	Brett Bodine	King Racing	Buick
27	Rusty Wallace	Blue Max Racing	Pontiac
28	Davey Allison	Robert Yates Racing	Ford
30	Michael Waltrip	Bahari Racing	Pontiac
33	Phil Parsons	Leo Jackson Motorsports	Oldsmobile
42	Kyle Petty	SABCO Racing	Pontiac
43	Richard Petty	Petty Enterprises	Pontiac
52	Jimmy Means	Jimmy Means Racing	Pontiac
57	Jimmy Spencer	Osterlund Racing	Pontiac
66	Dick Trickle	Cale Yarborough Motorsports	Pontiac
70	J. D. McDuffie	McDuffie Racing	Pontiac
71	Dave Marcis	Marcis Auto Racing	Chevrolet
75	Rick Wilson	RahMoc Enterprises	Oldsmobile
94	Sterling Marlin	Hagan Racing	Oldsmobile
98	Butch Miller	Travis Carter Enterprises	Chevrolet

== Qualifying ==
Qualifying was originally scheduled to be split into two rounds. The first round was scheduled to be held on Friday, April 6, at 4:00 PM EST. However, due to rain, the first round was cancelled, and qualifying was condensed into one round, which was held on Saturday, April 7, at 1:00 PM EST. Each driver would have one lap to set a time. For this specific race, positions 1–30 would be decided on time, and depending on who needed it, a select amount of positions were given to cars who had not otherwise qualified but were high enough in owner's points; up to two provisionals were given.

Ernie Irvan, driving for Morgan–McClure Motorsports, would win the pole, setting a time of 16.519 and an average speed of 116.157 miles per hour (186.937 km/h).

Two drivers would fail to qualify.

=== Full qualifying results ===
Pos.	#	Driver	Team	Make	Time	Speed
1	4	Ernie Irvan	Morgan–McClure Motorsports	Oldsmobile	16.519	116.157
2	11	Geoff Bodine	Junior Johnson & Associates	Ford	16.555	115.905
3	6	Mark Martin	Roush Racing	Ford	16.633	115.361
4	42	Kyle Petty	SABCO Racing	Pontiac	16.650	115.243
5	94	Sterling Marlin	Hagan Racing	Oldsmobile	16.662	115.160
6	66	Dick Trickle	Cale Yarborough Motorsports	Pontiac	16.692	114.953
7	15	Morgan Shepherd	Bud Moore Engineering	Ford	16.704	114.871
8	2	Rick Mast	U.S. Racing	Pontiac	16.717	114.781
9	3	Dale Earnhardt	Richard Childress Racing	Chevrolet	16.724	114.733
10	17	Darrell Waltrip	Hendrick Motorsports	Chevrolet	16.742	114.610
11	9	Bill Elliott	Melling Racing	Ford	16.747	114.576
12	21	Dale Jarrett	Wood Brothers Racing	Ford	16.749	114.562
13	5	Ricky Rudd	Hendrick Motorsports	Chevrolet	16.810	114.146
14	1	Terry Labonte	Precision Products Racing	Oldsmobile	16.813	114.126
15	8	Bobby Hillin Jr.	Stavola Brothers Racing	Buick	16.824	114.051
16	71	Dave Marcis	Marcis Auto Racing	Chevrolet	16.835	113.977
17	25	Ken Schrader	Hendrick Motorsports	Chevrolet	16.848	113.889
18	26	Brett Bodine	King Racing	Buick	16.851	113.869
19	28	Davey Allison	Robert Yates Racing	Ford	16.856	113.835
20	30	Michael Waltrip	Bahari Racing	Pontiac	16.874	113.713
21	7	Alan Kulwicki	AK Racing	Ford	16.876	113.700
22	10	Derrike Cope	Whitcomb Racing	Chevrolet	16.923	113.384
23	27	Rusty Wallace	Blue Max Racing	Pontiac	16.933	113.317
24	20	Rob Moroso (R)	Moroso Racing	Oldsmobile	16.933	113.317
25	75	Rick Wilson	RahMoc Enterprises	Pontiac	16.937	113.290
26	57	Jimmy Spencer	Osterlund Racing	Pontiac	16.982	112.990
27	52	Jimmy Means	Jimmy Means Racing	Pontiac	17.036	112.632
28	43	Richard Petty	Petty Enterprises	Pontiac	17.057	112.493
29	12	Mike Alexander	Bobby Allison Motorsports	Buick	17.103	112.191
30	70	J. D. McDuffie	McDuffie Racing	Pontiac	17.119	112.086
Provisionals
31	33	Phil Parsons	Leo Jackson Motorsports	Oldsmobile	-*	-*
32	98	Butch Miller	Travis Carter Enterprises	Chevrolet	-*	-*
Failed to qualify
33	19	Chad Little	Little Racing	Ford	-*	-*
34	16	Larry Pearson	Pearson Racing	Buick	-*	-*
Official starting lineup

== Race results ==
Fin	St	#	Driver	Team	Make	Laps	Led	Status	Pts	Winnings
1	19	28	Davey Allison	Robert Yates Racing	Ford	500	109	running	180	$50,100
2	3	6	Mark Martin	Roush Racing	Ford	500	0	running	170	$31,300
3	13	5	Ricky Rudd	Hendrick Motorsports	Chevrolet	500	0	running	165	$19,775
4	14	1	Terry Labonte	Precision Products Racing	Oldsmobile	500	0	running	160	$13,500
5	25	75	Rick Wilson	RahMoc Enterprises	Pontiac	500	0	running	155	$13,857
6	17	25	Ken Schrader	Hendrick Motorsports	Chevrolet	500	0	running	150	$11,675
7	5	94	Sterling Marlin	Hagan Racing	Oldsmobile	500	31	running	151	$8,850
8	7	15	Morgan Shepherd	Bud Moore Engineering	Ford	499	0	running	142	$8,475
9	10	17	Darrell Waltrip	Hendrick Motorsports	Chevrolet	499	167	running	148	$25,500
10	4	42	Kyle Petty	SABCO Racing	Pontiac	499	55	running	139	$11,900
11	12	21	Dale Jarrett	Wood Brothers Racing	Ford	493	39	running	135	$8,300
12	8	2	Rick Mast	U.S. Racing	Pontiac	489	0	running	127	$8,225
13	6	66	Dick Trickle	Cale Yarborough Motorsports	Pontiac	488	0	running	124	$7,950
14	32	98	Butch Miller	Travis Carter Enterprises	Chevrolet	486	0	running	121	$4,000
15	16	71	Dave Marcis	Marcis Auto Racing	Chevrolet	471	2	running	123	$7,025
16	1	4	Ernie Irvan	Morgan–McClure Motorsports	Oldsmobile	471	16	running	120	$8,800
17	11	9	Bill Elliott	Melling Racing	Ford	465	0	running	112	$10,850
18	26	57	Jimmy Spencer	Osterlund Racing	Pontiac	456	0	running	109	$6,050
19	9	3	Dale Earnhardt	Richard Childress Racing	Chevrolet	451	0	running	106	$10,990
20	20	30	Michael Waltrip	Bahari Racing	Pontiac	442	0	running	103	$6,725
21	15	8	Bobby Hillin Jr.	Stavola Brothers Racing	Buick	433	41	running	105	$5,725
22	18	26	Brett Bodine	King Racing	Buick	421	0	running	97	$5,620
23	29	12	Mike Alexander	Bobby Allison Motorsports	Buick	399	0	running	94	$3,400
24	2	11	Geoff Bodine	Junior Johnson & Associates	Ford	383	40	running	96	$11,225
25	31	33	Phil Parsons	Leo Jackson Motorsports	Oldsmobile	342	0	running	88	$9,080
26	28	43	Richard Petty	Petty Enterprises	Pontiac	328	0	engine	85	$3,900
27	30	70	J. D. McDuffie	McDuffie Racing	Pontiac	290	0	engine	82	$3,210
28	23	27	Rusty Wallace	Blue Max Racing	Pontiac	220	0	accident	79	$12,375
29	27	52	Jimmy Means	Jimmy Means Racing	Pontiac	202	0	camshaft	76	$3,745
30	24	20	Rob Moroso (R)	Moroso Racing	Oldsmobile	169	0	accident	73	$3,850
31	21	7	Alan Kulwicki	AK Racing	Ford	126	0	oil pan	70	$4,600
32	22	10	Derrike Cope	Whitcomb Racing	Chevrolet	56	0	accident	67	$7,300
Official race results

== Standings after the race ==
Drivers' Championship standings

	Pos	Driver	Points
	1	Dale Earnhardt	945
	2	Morgan Shepherd	903 (-42)
1	3	Kyle Petty	824 (-121)
3	4	Mark Martin	824 (–121)
2	5	Geoff Bodine	804 (–141)
2	6	Ken Schrader	796 (–149)
2	7	Bill Elliott	789 (–156)
2	8	Darrell Waltrip	766 (–179)
3	9	Sterling Marlin	764 (–181)
4	10	Rusty Wallace	750 (–195)
Official driver's standings

- Note: Only the first 10 positions are included for the driver standings.

Previous race: 1990 TranSouth 500	NASCAR Winston Cup Series; 1990 season	Next race: 1990 First Union 400
