= Unocal 76 Challenge =

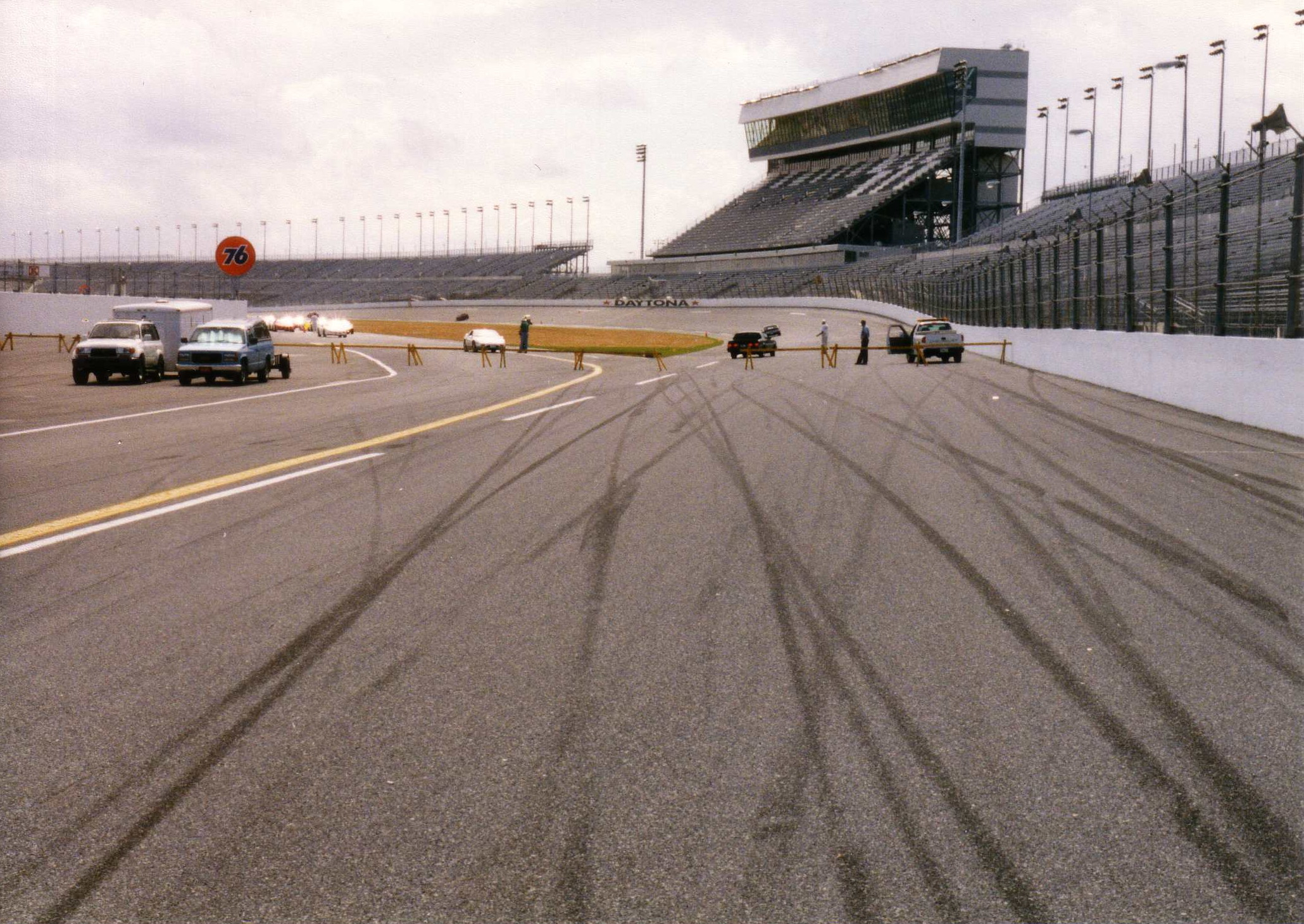
A Unocal 76 ball is visible (left) at Daytona in the late 1990s.

The Unocal 76 Challenge was an award program for the NASCAR Winston Cup Series from 1989-1999 sponsored by the Unocal Corporation. Unocal posted a $7,600 cash prize if the pole position winner for each NASCAR Winston Cup event went on to win the race. If the prize was not claimed, it was rolled over to the next race until the pot was claimed.

The award program proved to be popular among competitors and fans, and was considered NASCAR's version of a Skins Game. The award provided over $2 million in cash prizes to NASCAR drivers.

== Award details ==
In December 1988, Unocal, the official provider of gasoline fuel for NASCAR at the time, created a cash prize incentive for drivers who win a race from the pole position. It would begin with the 1989 NASCAR season. The $7,600 amount was a gesture to Unocal's famous 76 logo. At the time, drivers had few incentives to win pole positions. As such, it was not unusual for smaller teams to put in extra effort for qualifying in order to win poles and gain exposure (but performing as an also-ran in the race itself), while top teams sometimes would forgo some effort in qualifying and concentrate on race set-ups. The Busch Pole Award was only $500, championship points are not awarded for pole positions, and the pole winner was not given the honor of the first pit stall selection until the mid-1990s. In the late 1980s and early 1990s, many NASCAR races, particularly at smaller tracks, still had relatively small purses. The Unocal 76 Challenge gave drivers the potential of significantly increasing their possible winning payouts.

The award was eligible only to the driver who officially won the pole position during Busch Pole Qualifying for each points-paying NASCAR Winston Cup Series race. If the pole position winner went on to win the race, he was awarded a cash prize of $7,600. If the award was not achieved, the $7,600 was rolled over to the next race. The award would continue to roll over until it was claimed. If the award was not won during the final race of the season, it rolled over to the first race of the next season, and continued.

If qualifying was rained out, and the starting field set by points, the award was not available for that race, and would roll over to the next event automatically.

The Unocal 76 Challenge bonus money was awarded alongside a separate Unocal 76 Contingency Award, which was handed out at the end of the season.

== Award history ==
Initially, the award did not receive much attention. The first driver eligible for the award was Ken Schrader, who won the pole position for the 1989 Daytona 500. Schrader finished second in the race, so the award rolled over to the next race. At the second race of the season, the Goodwrench 500 at North Carolina Motor Speedway, Rusty Wallace won from the pole position. He became the first driver to claim the Unocal Challenge, and collected an initial award of $15,200 which included one rollover. (At the season-ending banquet, Wallace was presented with a total check for $22,800)

As the 1989 season wore on, the award was not being won, and the cash prize rolled over every subsequent week. Mid-way through the season, it was nearing $100,000. In the final race of the season at Atlanta, the award had grown to $205,200, considerably more than the $50,000 first prize. Polesitter Alan Kulwicki failed to win the race, and the award rolled over to the 1990 season.

At the 1990 season opener, the Daytona 500, Ken Schrader won the pole position. The Unocal Challenge award was up to $212,800. Controversy erupted when Schrader wrecked his car during the Gatorade 125s. NASCAR deemed that Schrader, who would start the race from the rear of the field in a back-up car, was still eligible for the huge award. The controversy fizzled when Schrader dropped out early. (The car that actually started from the pole spot, Geoff Bodine, did not win either). The bonus rolled over yet again.

One week later, at Goodwrench 500 at North Carolina Motor Speedway, the Unocal Challenge bonus stood at $228,000. Kyle Petty finally broke the streak, leading 433 laps (of 492) and won the race from the pole position. His bonus money (officially $228,000), along with the posted race purse, gave him total earnings of $284,450 a single-race NASCAR record at the time.

=== Winners ===
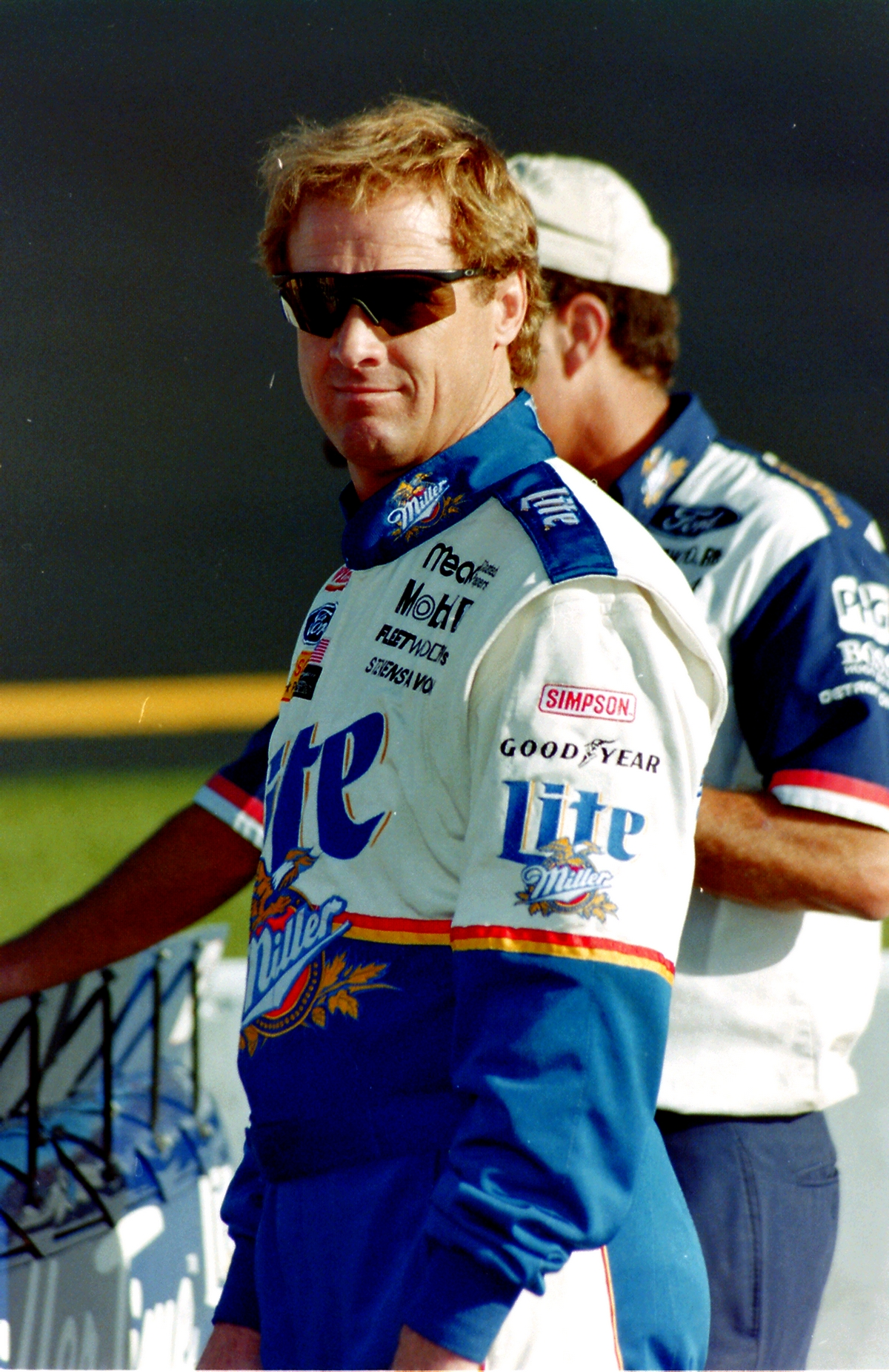
Rusty Wallace became the first driver to win the Unocal Challenge bonus.

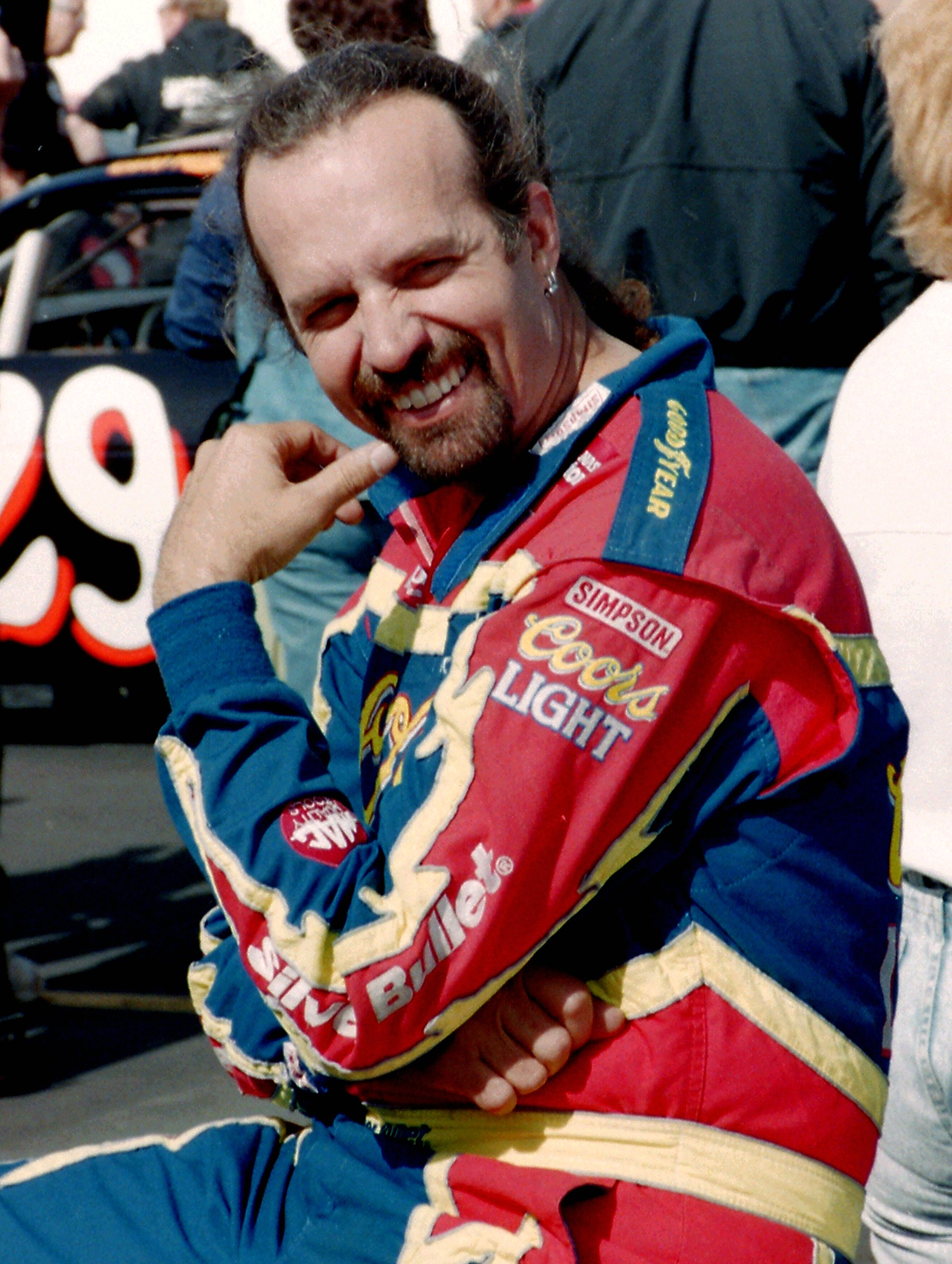
Kyle Petty won a record $228,400 Unocal Challenge bonus in 1990.

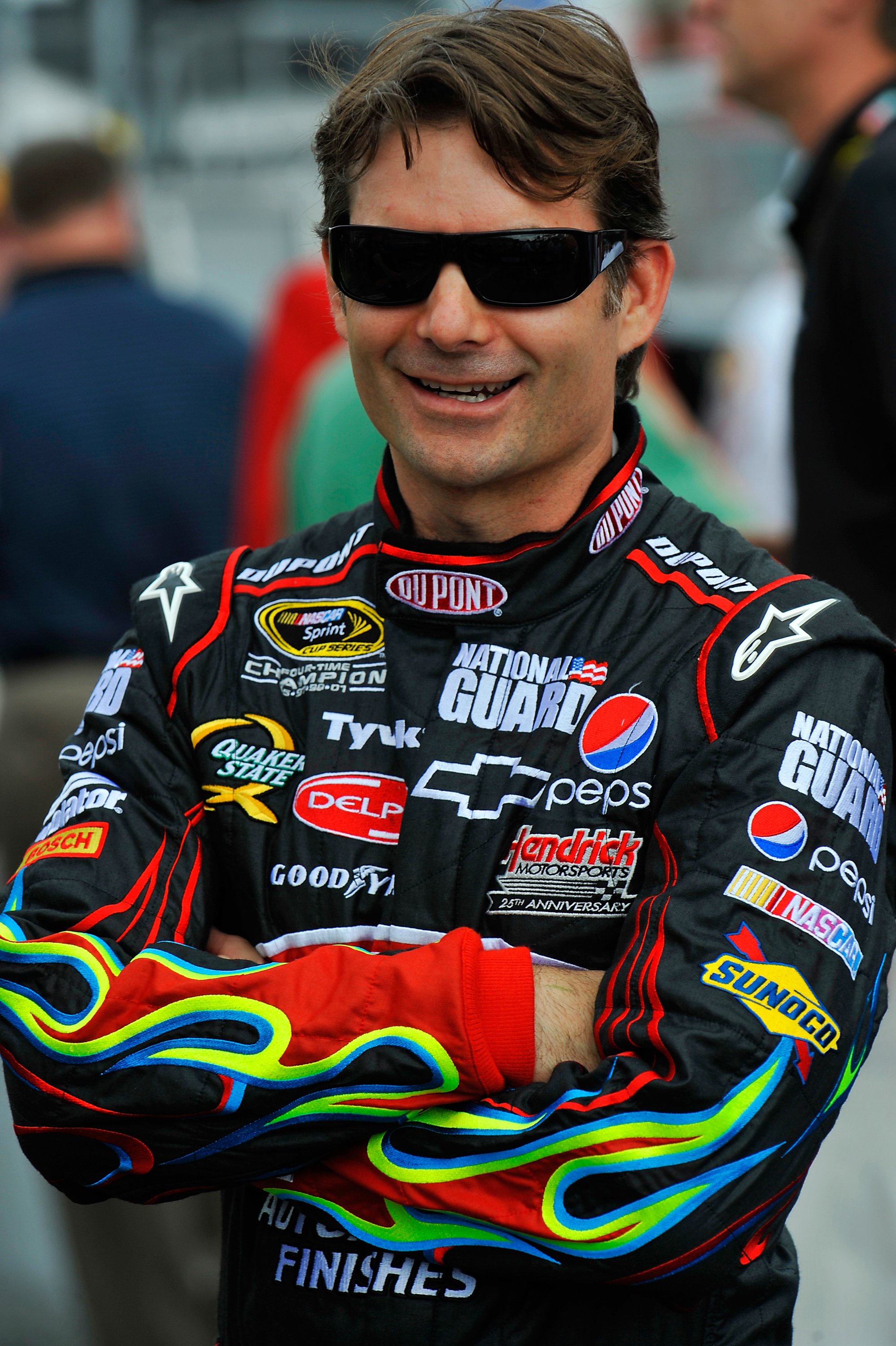
Jeff Gordon won the Unocal Challenge bonus a record eleven times.

1989

- Rusty Wallace — Goodwrench 500: $22,800 (original prize was $15,200 which included 1 rollover; additional season-end bonus brought total to $22,800)

1990

- Kyle Petty — Goodwrench 500: $228,000 (included 29 rollovers)
- Geoff Bodine — Hanes 500: $38,000
- Dale Earnhardt — DieHard 500: $68,400
- Dale Earnhardt — Heinz Southern 500: $30,400
- Bill Elliott — Peak AntiFreeze 500: $15,200

1991

- Kyle Petty — Goodwrench 500: $68,400
- Rusty Wallace — Valleydale Meats 500: $22,800

1992

- Bill Elliott — Pontiac Excitement 400: $197,600
- Alan Kulwicki — Food City 500: $22,800
- Davey Allison — Miller Genuine Draft 400: $60,800
- Kyle Petty — AC Delco 500: $98,800

1993

- Rusty Wallace — Food City 500: $60,800 (included 7 rollovers)
- Mark Martin — Budweiser At The Glen: $98,800 (included 12 rollovers)
- Mark Martin — Bud 500: $15,200 (included 1 rollover)
- Rusty Wallace — SplitFire Spark Plug 500: $22,800 (included 2 rollovers)
- Ernie Irvan — Goody's 500: $7,600

1994

- Rusty Wallace — Hanes 500: $98,800 (included 12 rollovers)
- Ernie Irvan — Save Mart Supermarkets 300: $15,200 (included 1 rollover)
- Jeff Gordon — Coca-Cola 600: $7,600
- Rusty Wallace — UAW-GM Teamwork 500: $15,200 (included 1 rollover)
- Geoff Bodine — Miller Genuine Draft 500: $30,400 (included 3 rollovers)
- Mark Martin — Bud At The Glen: $22,800 (included 2 rollovers)
- Geoff Bodine — GM Goodwrench Dealer 400: $7,600

1995

- Jeff Gordon — Goodwrench 500: $91,200 (included 11 rollovers)
- Sterling Marlin — DieHard 500: $121,600 (included 15 rollovers)
- Mark Martin — Bud At The Glen: $15,200 (included 1 rollover)
- Bobby Labonte — GM Goodwrench Dealer 400: $7,600

1996

- Terry Labonte — First Union 400: $129,200 (included 16 rollovers)
- Jeff Gordon — Miller 500: $38,000 (included 4 rollovers)
- Jeff Gordon — UAW-GM Teamwork 500: $7,600
- Bobby Labonte — NAPA 500: $136,800 (included 17 rollovers)
- Rusty Wallace - NASCAR Suzuka Thunder Special: $7,600

1997

- Dale Jarrett — TranSouth Financial 400: $38,000 (included 4 rollovers)
- Mark Martin — Save Mart Supermarkets 300: $30,400 (included 3 rollovers)
- Jeff Gordon — Coca-Cola 600: $15,200 (included 1 rollover)
- Mark Martin — MBNA 400: $114,000 (included 14 rollovers)

1998

- Bobby Hamilton — Goody's Headache Powder 500: $106,400 (included 13 rollovers)
- Bobby Labonte — DieHard 500: $7,600
- Jeff Gordon — Coca-Cola 600: $15,200 (included 1 rollover)
- Jeff Gordon — Save Mart/Kragen 350: $38,000 (included 4 rollovers)
- Jeff Gordon — Bud At The Glen: $30,400 (included 3 rollovers)
- Jeff Gordon — Farm Aid on CMT 300: $22,800 (included 2 rollovers)
- Mark Martin — MBNA Gold 400: $22,800 (included 2 rollovers)

1999

- Jeff Gordon — Daytona 500: $60,800 (included 7 rollovers)
- Rusty Wallace — Food City 500: $45,600 (included 5 rollovers)
- Bobby Labonte — MBNA Platinum 400: $45,600 (included 5 rollovers)
- Jeff Gordon — Save Mart/Kragen 350: $22,800 (included 2 rollovers)
- $136,800 unclaimed over the final 17 races of the season

== Final statistics ==
In 1997, Unocal sold its western United States refining and marketing operations to Tosco Corporation, including the rights to the Union 76 brand for refining and marketing. In a related move, longtime NASCAR fixture Bill Brodrick, the head of public relations for Unocal's racing division and known as "The Hat Man" in victory lane, was released from his position.

At the end of the 1999 season, the Unocal 76 Challenge bonus was retired, with $136,800 in bonus money going unclaimed over the final 17 races of the season. After the 2003 season, Unocal left the sport of NASCAR.

During its eleven-year history, the Unocal 76 Challenge bonus was claimed 48 times by 15 different drivers. The total bonus money awarded was $2,447,600. Jeff Gordon won the Unocal 76 Challenge bonus the most times (11) for a total of $349,600 in prize money. The driver winning the most bonus money, however, was Kyle Petty who pocketed $395,600 for his three rather large Unocal 76 Challenge bonuses.

Two times during the award's tenure, Dale Earnhardt won races from the pole position (1990 TranSouth 500 & 1993 TranSouth 500) but qualifying was rained out in both cases. Those field were set by championship owners points standings, and the award was automatically rolled over to the next race without being given out in both situations.

== See also ==
- Unocal 76 World Pit Crew Competition
- Winston Million
