= 1990 NASCAR Winston Cup Series =

American motorsport season

Seasons
- ← 1989 1991 →

The 1990 NASCAR Winston Cup Series was the 42nd season of professional stock car racing in the United States and the 19th modern-era Cup Series. It began on Sunday, February 11, and ended on Sunday, November 18. Because of a highly controversial penalty to Mark Martin early in the season, Dale Earnhardt with Richard Childress Racing was crowned the Winston Cup champion for the fourth time, edging out Martin by 26 points.

== Teams and drivers ==
=== Complete schedule ===
Manufactuter	Team	No.	Driver	Crew Chief
Buick	Bobby Allison Racing	12	Mike Alexander 7	Jimmy Fennig
Buick	Bobby Allison Racing	12	Jeff Purvis 1	Jimmy Fennig
Buick	Bobby Allison Racing	12	Hut Stricklin 21	Jimmy Fennig
Buick	King Racing	26	Brett Bodine	Larry McReynolds
Buick	Stavola Brothers Racing	8	Bobby Hillin Jr.	Harry Hyde
Chevrolet	Hendrick Motorsports	5	Ricky Rudd	Waddell Wilson
Chevrolet	Hendrick Motorsports	17	Darrell Waltrip 23	Jeff Hammond
Chevrolet	Hendrick Motorsports	17	Jimmy Horton 2	Jeff Hammond
Chevrolet	Hendrick Motorsports	17	Sarel van der Merwe 1	Jeff Hammond
Chevrolet	Hendrick Motorsports	17	Greg Sacks 3	Jeff Hammond
Chevrolet	Hendrick Motorsports	25	Ken Schrader	Richard Broome
Chevrolet	Marcis Auto Racing	71	Dave Marcis	Bob Marcis
Chevrolet	Richard Childress Racing	3	Dale Earnhardt	Kirk Shelmerdine
Chevrolet	Travis Carter Enterprises	98	Butch Miller 23	Travis Carter
Chevrolet	Travis Carter Enterprises	98	Rick Mast 6	Travis Carter
Chevrolet	Whitcomb Racing	10	Derrike Cope	Buddy Parrott
Ford	AK Racing	7	Alan Kulwicki	Paul Andrews
Ford	Bud Moore Engineering	15	Morgan Shepherd	Donnie Wingo
Ford	Junior Johnson & Associates	11	Geoff Bodine	Tim Brewer
Ford	Melling Racing	9	Bill Elliott	Mike Beam
Ford	Robert Yates Racing	28	Davey Allison	Jake Elder
Ford	Roush Racing	6	Mark Martin	Robin Pemberton
Ford	Wood Brothers Racing	21	Neil Bonnett 5	Leonard Wood
Ford	Wood Brothers Racing	21	Dale Jarrett 24	Leonard Wood
Oldsmobile	Hagan Racing	94	Sterling Marlin	Steve Loyd
Oldsmobile	Leo Jackson Motorsports	33	Harry Gant 28	Andy Petree
Oldsmobile	Leo Jackson Motorsports	33	Phil Parsons 1	Andy Petree
Oldsmobile	Moroso Racing	20	Rob Moroso (R) 25	Steve Bird 4 Jake Elder 25
Oldsmobile	Moroso Racing	20	Jimmy Hensley 2	Steve Bird 4 Jake Elder 25
Oldsmobile	Moroso Racing	20	Chad Little 1	Steve Bird 4 Jake Elder 25
Oldsmobile	Moroso Racing	20	Steve Grissom 1	Steve Bird 4 Jake Elder 25
Oldsmobile	Precision Products Racing	1	Terry Labonte	Cliff Champion
Oldsmobile	RahMoc Enterprises	75	Rick Wilson	Bob Rahilly
Pontiac	Bahari Racing	30	Michael Waltrip	Bill Ingle
Pontiac	Blue Max Racing	27	Rusty Wallace	Jimmy Makar
Pontiac	Cale Yarborough Motorsports	66	Dick Trickle	Doug Williams
Pontiac	Means Racing	52	Jimmy Means	Darrell Bryant
Pontiac	Osterlund Racing	57	Jimmy Spencer 26	
Pontiac	Osterlund Racing	57	Jim Bown 3	
Pontiac	Petty Enterprises	43	Richard Petty	Dale Inman
Pontiac	SABCO Racing	42	Kyle Petty	Gary Nelson
Oldsmobile 17 Chevrolet 12	Morgan-McClure Motorsports	4	Phil Parsons 3	Tony Glover
Oldsmobile 17 Chevrolet 12	Morgan-McClure Motorsports	4	Ernie Irvan 26	Tony Glover

=== Limited schedule ===
Manufacturer	Team	No.	Driver	Crew Chief	Round(s)
Buick	Freymiller Racing	23	Mike Chase	Jim Benison	3
Buick	Pearson Racing	16	Larry Pearson	Ricky Pearson	5
Buick	Troy Beebe	93	Troy Beebe		3
Chevrolet	Hendrick Motorsports	18	Greg Sacks	Gary DeHart	13
Chevrolet	Hendrick Motorsports	18	Stan Barrett	Gary DeHart	1
Chevrolet	Hendrick Motorsports	46	Greg Sacks	Gary DeHart	1
Chevrolet	Hendrick Motorsports	51	Hut Stricklin	Dennis Connor	1
Chevrolet	Larry Hedrick Motorsports	41	Larry Pearson	Larry Hedrick	5
Chevrolet	Phoenix Racing	51	Jeff Purvis	Frankie Grill	4
Chevrolet	Ray DeWitt	50	Rich Vogler		2
Chevrolet	Ray DeWitt	50	Ted Musgrave		2
Chevrolet	Reno Enterprises	40	Tommy Kendall	Tony Eury Sr.	4
Chevrolet	Spears Motorsports	76	Bill Sedgwick	Leon Ruther	4
Chevrolet	Tex Racing	97	Chuck Bown		3
Chevrolet	Venturini Motorsports	35	Bill Venturini		7
Ford	Little Racing	19	Chad Little (R)		20
Ford	Branch-Ragan Racing	77	Ken Ragan	Gary Cruise	7
Ford	Dick Johnson Racing	38	Dick Johnson	Ray Evernham	4
Ford	Dick Johnson Racing	38	Jim Sauter	Ray Evernham	1
Ford	Donlavey Racing	90	Ernie Irvan	Junie Donlavey	3
Ford	Donlavey Racing	90	Buddy Baker	Junie Donlavey	8
Ford	Donlavey Racing	90	Troy Beebe	Junie Donlavey	1
Ford	Donlavey Racing	90	Charlie Glotzbach	Junie Donlavey	1
Ford	Gibbs Racing	01	Mickey Gibbs (R)	David Ifft	12
Ford	H.L. Waters Racing	0	Delma Cowart		6
Ford	H.L. Waters Racing	0	Jim Sauter		1
Ford	S & H Racing	80	Jimmy Horton		8
Ford	Stahl Racing	82	Mark Stahl		12
Oldsmobile	A.J. Foyt Enterprises	14	A. J. Foyt		4
Oldsmobile	Aroneck Racing	53	Jerry O'Neil	Alan Aroneck	7
Oldsmobile	B & B Racing	23	Eddie Bierschwale		2
Oldsmobile	Barkdoll Motorsports	72	Phil Parsons		1
Oldsmobile	Barkdoll Motorsports	73	Phil Barkdoll		3
Oldsmobile	Bickle Racing	02	Rich Bickle		1
Oldsmobile	Close Racing	47	Jack Pennington (R)	Tony Furr	16
Oldsmobile	George Hakes Racing	54	Tommy Riggins		4
Oldsmobile	Speed Racing	83	Lake Speed		7
Oldsmobile	Speed Racing	83	Tommy Ellis		2
Oldsmobile	Speed Racing	83	Phil Parsons		1
Oldsmobile	Precision Products Racing	0	Irv Hoerr		2
Oldsmobile	U.S. Racing	2	Eddie Bierschwale	Bob Johnson	1
Pontiac	U.S. Racing	2	Rick Mast	Bob Johnson	10
Pontiac	U.S. Racing	2	Jim Bown	Bob Johnson	1
Pontiac	U.S. Racing	2	Troy Beebe	Bob Johnson	3
Pontiac	U.S. Racing	2	Charlie Glotzbach	Bob Johnson	2
Pontiac	U.S. Racing	2	Jerry O'Neil	Bob Johnson	1
Pontiac	U.S. Racing	2	D.K. Ulrich	Bob Johnson	1
Pontiac	U.S. Racing	2	Jim Sauter	Bob Johnson	1
Pontiac	U.S. Racing	2	Ron Esau	Bob Johnson	2
Pontiac	U.S. Racing	2	Ted Musgrave	Bob Johnson	2
Pontiac	U.S. Racing	22	Rick Mast		4
Pontiac	U.S. Racing	22	Rick Ware		1
Pontiac	Diamond Ridge Motorsports	29	Phil Parsons	Doug Richert	3
Pontiac	Diamond Ridge Motorsports	68	Bobby Hamilton		1
Pontiac	McDuffie Racing	70	J. D. McDuffie	Jeff McDuffie	25
Pontiac	Mueller Brothers Racing	89	Rodney Combs		7
Pontiac	TriStar Motorsports	18	Hut Stricklin		1
Pontiac	TriStar Motorsports	68	Hut Stricklin		1
Pontiac	TriStar Motorsports	68	Stanley Smith		1
Pontiac	TriStar Motorsports	68	Mike Chase		1
Pontiac	TriStar Motorsports	68	Bobby Hamilton		2
Pontiac	Wawak Racing	74	Mike Potter		7
Pontiac	Wawak Racing	74	John Linville		1

== Schedule ==
No.	Race title	Track	Date
	Busch Clash	Daytona International Speedway, Daytona Beach	February 11
	Twin 125 Qualifiers	Daytona International Speedway, Daytona Beach	February 15
1	Daytona 500	Daytona International Speedway, Daytona Beach	February 18
2	Pontiac Excitement 400	Richmond International Raceway, Richmond	February 25
3	GM Goodwrench 500	North Carolina Motor Speedway, Rockingham	March 4
4	Motorcraft 500	Atlanta International Raceway, Hampton	March 18
5	TranSouth 500	Darlington Raceway, Darlington	April 1
6	Valleydale Meats 500	Bristol International Raceway, Bristol	April 8
7	First Union 400	North Wilkesboro Speedway, North Wilkesboro	April 22
8	Hanes Activewear 500	Martinsville Speedway, Ridgeway	April 29
9	Winston 500	Talladega Superspeedway, Talladega	May 6
	Winston Open	Charlotte Motor Speedway, Concord	May 20
	The Winston	Charlotte Motor Speedway, Concord	May 20
10	Coca-Cola 600	Charlotte Motor Speedway, Concord	May 27
11	Budweiser 500	Dover Downs International Speedway, Dover	June 3
12	Banquet Frozen Foods 300	Sears Point Raceway, Sonoma	June 10
13	Miller Genuine Draft 500	Pocono International Raceway, Long Pond	June 17
14	Miller Genuine Draft 400	Michigan International Speedway, Brooklyn	June 24
15	Pepsi 400	Daytona International Speedway, Daytona Beach	July 7
16	AC Spark Plug 500	Pocono International Raceway, Long Pond	July 22
17	DieHard 500	Talladega Superspeedway, Talladega	July 29
18	Budweiser at The Glen	Watkins Glen International, Watkins Glen	August 12
19	Champion Spark Plug 400	Michigan International Speedway, Brooklyn	August 19
20	Busch 500	Bristol International Raceway, Bristol	August 25
21	Heinz Southern 500	Darlington Raceway, Darlington	September 2
22	Miller Genuine Draft 400	Richmond International Raceway, Richmond	September 9
23	Peak Antifreeze 500	Dover Downs International Speedway, Dover	September 16
24	Goody's 500	Martinsville Speedway, Ridgeway	September 23
25	Tyson Holly Farms 400	North Wilkesboro Speedway, North Wilkesboro	September 30
26	Mello Yello 500	Charlotte Motor Speedway, Concord	October 7
27	AC Delco 500	North Carolina Motor Speedway, Rockingham	October 21
28	Checker 500	Phoenix International Raceway, Phoenix	November 4
29	Atlanta Journal 500	Atlanta Motor Speedway, Hampton	November 18
	NASCAR Christmas 400	Calder Park Thunderdome, Melbourne	December 2

== Races ==
No.	Race	Pole position	Most laps led	Winning driver	Manufacturer
	Busch Clash	Jimmy Hensley	Ken Schrader	Ken Schrader	Chevrolet
	Twin 125 #1	Ken Schrader	Ken Schrader	Geoff Bodine	Ford
	Twin 125 #2	Dale Earnhardt	Dick Trickle	Dale Earnhardt	Chevrolet
1	Daytona 500	Ken Schrader	Dale Earnhardt	Derrike Cope	Chevrolet
2	Pontiac Excitement 400	Ricky Rudd	Rusty Wallace	Mark Martin	Ford
3	GM Goodwrench 500	Kyle Petty	Kyle Petty	Kyle Petty	Pontiac
4	Motorcraft 500	Dale Earnhardt	Dale Earnhardt	Dale Earnhardt	Chevrolet
5	TranSouth 500	Geoff Bodine	Geoff Bodine	Dale Earnhardt	Chevrolet
6	Valleydale Meats 500	Ernie Irvan	Darrell Waltrip	Davey Allison	Ford
7	First Union 400	Mark Martin	Brett Bodine	Brett Bodine	Buick
8	Hanes Activewear 500	Geoff Bodine	Geoff Bodine	Geoff Bodine	Ford
9	Winston 500	Bill Elliott	Dale Earnhardt	Dale Earnhardt	Chevrolet
	Winston Open	Ernie Irvan	Ernie Irvan	Dick Trickle	Pontiac
	The Winston	Dale Earnhardt	Dale Earnhardt	Dale Earnhardt	Chevrolet
10	Coca-Cola 600	Ken Schrader	Rusty Wallace	Rusty Wallace	Pontiac
11	Budweiser 500	Dick Trickle	Rusty Wallace	Derrike Cope	Chevrolet
12	Banquet Frozen Foods 300	Ricky Rudd	Rusty Wallace	Rusty Wallace	Pontiac
13	Miller Genuine Draft 500	Ernie Irvan	Geoff Bodine	Harry Gant	Oldsmobile
14	Miller Genuine Draft 400	Mark Martin	Bill Elliott	Dale Earnhardt	Chevrolet
15	Pepsi 400	Greg Sacks	Dale Earnhardt	Dale Earnhardt	Chevrolet
16	AC Spark Plug 500	Mark Martin	Geoff Bodine	Geoff Bodine	Ford
17	DieHard 500	Dale Earnhardt	Dale Earnhardt	Dale Earnhardt	Chevrolet
18	Budweiser at The Glen	Dale Earnhardt	Rusty Wallace	Ricky Rudd	Chevrolet
19	Champion Spark Plug 400	Alan Kulwicki	Mark Martin	Mark Martin	Ford
20	Busch 500	Dale Earnhardt	Dale Earnhardt	Ernie Irvan	Chevrolet
21	Heinz Southern 500	Dale Earnhardt	Dale Earnhardt	Dale Earnhardt	Chevrolet
22	Miller Genuine Draft 400	Ernie Irvan	Dale Earnhardt	Dale Earnhardt	Chevrolet
23	Peak Antifreeze 500	Bill Elliott	Bill Elliott	Bill Elliott	Ford
24	Goody's 500	Mark Martin	Ricky Rudd	Geoff Bodine	Ford
25	Tyson Holly Farms 400	Kyle Petty	Dale Earnhardt	Mark Martin	Ford
26	Mello Yello 500	Brett Bodine	Bill Elliott	Davey Allison	Ford
27	AC Delco 500	Ken Schrader	Kyle Petty	Alan Kulwicki	Ford
28	Checker 500	Rusty Wallace	Dale Earnhardt	Dale Earnhardt	Chevrolet
29	Atlanta Journal 500	Rusty Wallace	Bill Elliott	Morgan Shepherd	Ford

=== Busch Clash ===
The exhibition Busch Clash race, for drivers who have won a pole position in the previous season or have won the event before, was held on February 11 at Daytona International Speedway. Jimmy Hensley drew the pole.

Results

1. #25 - Ken Schrader
2. #46 - Greg Sacks*
3. #28 - Davey Allison
4. #11 - Geoff Bodine
5. #9 - Bill Elliott
6. #6 - Mark Martin
7. #7 - Alan Kulwicki
8. #27 - Rusty Wallace
9. #15 - Morgan Shepherd
10. #20 - Jimmy Hensley
- Sacks' #46 Chevrolet was entered for in-race footage for the 1990 film Days of Thunder.

=== Gatorade Twin 125s ===
The Gatorade Twin 125s qualifying for the Daytona 500 was held on February 15 at Daytona International Speedway.

Top-Ten Results: (Race One)

1. #11 - Geoff Bodine
2. #33 - Harry Gant
3. #6 - Mark Martin
4. #17 - Darrell Waltrip
5. #43 - Richard Petty
6. #14 - A. J. Foyt
7. #25 - Ken Schrader
8. #12 - Mike Alexander
9. #98 - Butch Miller
10. #5 - Ricky Rudd

Top-Ten Results: (Race Two)

1. #3 - Dale Earnhardt*
2. #9 - Bill Elliott
3. #57 - Jimmy Spencer
4. #4 - Phil Parsons
5. #8 - Bobby Hillin Jr.
6. #10 - Derrike Cope
7. #83 - Lake Speed
8. #28 - Davey Allison
9. #90 - Ernie Irvan
10. #1 - Terry Labonte
- Two cars entered by Hendrick Motorsports (the #46 Superflo Chevrolet driven by Greg Sacks and the #51 Exxon Chevrolet driven by Rick Mast) were entered into in-race footage for the 1990 film Days of Thunder. Both cars were unscored and withdrew from the race early.
- This would be the first of what would be ten consecutive Daytona Duel victories for Earnhardt, lasting all the way to 1999.

=== Daytona 500 ===
The 32nd annual Daytona 500 was held on February 18 at Daytona International Speedway. Ken Schrader won the pole position, but was forced to start in the back of the field after crashing in the first Duel race.

Top-Ten Results:

1. #10 - Derrike Cope*
2. #1 - Terry Labonte
3. #9 - Bill Elliott
4. #5 - Ricky Rudd
5. #3 - Dale Earnhardt*
6. #8 - Bobby Hillin Jr.
7. #27 - Rusty Wallace
8. #30 - Michael Waltrip -1 lap
9. #11 - Geoff Bodine -1 lap
10. #15 - Morgan Shepherd -1 lap

Failed to qualify: #0 - Delma Cowart, #13 - Mike Potter, #19 - Chad Little, #29 - Joe Booher, #34 - Charlie Glotzbach, #35 - Bill Venturini, #37 - Dennis Langston, #39 - Blackie Wangerin, #44 - Jim Sauter, #48 - Trevor Boys, #59 - Mark Gibson, #70 - J. D. McDuffie, #72 - Stan Barrett, #77 - Ken Ragan, #82 - Mark Stahl, #85 - Bobby Gerhart, #89 - Rodney Combs, #96 - Phillip Duffie, #01 - Mickey Gibbs

- Dale Earnhardt dominated the race, leading 155 of 200 laps. While leading on the last lap , Earnhardt ran over a piece of Rick Wilson's expired engine cutting the right rear tire in turn three on the final lap allowing Derrike Cope to shoot past for the win.
- This was Cope's first career Cup Series victory, becoming the first driver since Pete Hamilton in 1970 to score his first Cup victory in the Daytona 500, and the fourth overall.
- Two cars entered by Hendrick Motorsports (the #18 Hardee's Chevrolet driven by Tommy Ellis and the #51 Mello Yello Chevrolet driven by Bobby Hamilton) were entered for in-race footage for the 1990 film Days of Thunder. Both cars were unscored and withdrew from the race early.
- Despite starting in the back, Schrader would still be eligible for the Unocal 76 Challenge, which at that point, had rolled over to $212,800.

=== Pontiac Excitement 400 ===
The Pontiac Excitement 400 was held on February 25 at Richmond International Raceway. Ricky Rudd won the pole.

Top-Ten Results:

1. #6 - Mark Martin*
2. #3 - Dale Earnhardt
3. #5 - Ricky Rudd
4. #9 - Bill Elliott
5. #66 - Dick Trickle
6. #27 - Rusty Wallace
7. #15 - Morgan Shepherd
8. #26 - Brett Bodine
9. #57 - Jimmy Spencer
10. #25 - Ken Schrader

Failed to qualify: #70 - J. D. McDuffie, #53 - Jerry O'Neil

- This was possibly the coldest race in NASCAR history, with a temperature in the mid-20s and winds gusting to 41 MPH, generating a wind chill of about 5 degrees.
- After winning the race, Martin would be docked 46 points after NASCAR officials discovered a somewhat oversized carburetor spacer plate in his car. This ultimately became a key factor in determining the 1990 championship.
- It was admitted later that the spacer plate was actually not oversized and not technically illegal. The part was bolted on instead of welded on, thus landing in the "gray area" of NASCAR rules. Dale Earnhardt and his car owner, Richard Childress, who finished second in the race, protested the result because of the findings of the post-race inspection. NASCAR eventually ruled that Martin's victory would stand, but would lose 46 points as a result of the infraction. This has spawned many years of speculation that NASCAR was biased toward Earnhardt, the eventual seven-time champion, but given that the race was only the second of the season (27 races still remained), nobody could have foreseen that the penalty would decide the points championship at the conclusion of the season.

=== GM Goodwrench 500 ===
The GM Goodwrench 500 was held on March 4, 1990, at North Carolina Motor Speedway. Kyle Petty won the pole.

Top-Ten results:

1. #42 - Kyle Petty*
2. #11 - Geoff Bodine
3. #25 - Ken Schrader -1 lap
4. #94 - Sterling Marlin -2 laps
5. #27 - Rusty Wallace -2 laps
6. #17 - Darrell Waltrip -3 laps
7. #15 - Morgan Shepherd -3 laps
8. #57 - Jimmy Spencer -3 laps
9. #1 - Terry Labonte -3 laps
10. #3 - Dale Earnhardt -3 laps

Failed to qualify: none

- This was Kyle Petty's first pole on his 277th start. Petty would dominate, leading 433 of the 492 laps. Petty claimed the Unocal 76 Challenge, which had rolled over 29 times since it had last been won. Petty won a bonus of $228,400 in addition to the race purse, for an all-time NASCAR record (at the time) $284,450 single-race payday. Car owner Felix Sebates presented Petty with a Rolls-Royce as a gift for winning the elusive bonus.

=== Motorcraft Quality Parts 500 ===
The Motorcraft Quality Parts 500 was held on March 18 at Atlanta Motor Speedway. Dale Earnhardt won the pole.

Top Ten Results

1. #3 - Dale Earnhardt
2. #15 - Morgan Shepherd
3. #4 - Ernie Irvan*
4. #25 - Ken Schrader
5. #6 - Mark Martin
6. #42 - Kyle Petty
7. #11 - Geoff Bodine
8. #7 - Alan Kulwicki -1 lap
9. #33 - Harry Gant -1 lap
10. #94 - Sterling Marlin -2 laps

Failed to qualify: #14 - A. J. Foyt, #46 - Greg Sacks, #70 - J. D. McDuffie

- Ernie Irvan replaced Phil Parsons in the #4 Oldsmobile for Morgan-McClure Motorsports. This began a 3½ year tenure for Irvan at MMM.

=== TranSouth 500 ===
The TranSouth 500 was held on April 1 at Darlington Raceway. Geoff Bodine started on the pole.

Top-Ten Results:

1. #3 - Dale Earnhardt
2. #6 - Mark Martin
3. #28 - Davey Allison
4. #11 - Geoff Bodine
5. #15 - Morgan Shepherd
6. #33 - Harry Gant
7. #9 - Bill Elliott
8. #26 - Brett Bodine
9. #30 - Michael Waltrip
10. #25 - Ken Schrader -1 lap

Failed to qualify: #48 - Norm Benning, #74 - Mike Potter, #82 - Mark Stahl

- The race came under some controversy, as Ernie Irvan, who was ten laps down, was racing aggressively against then-leader Ken Schrader, lost control and started a large pileup. Neil Bonnett would suffer career-ending injuries in the incident.
- Two cars entered by Hendrick Motorsports (the #46 City Chevrolet driven by Greg Sacks and the #51 Exxon Chevrolet driven by Hut Stricklin) were originally for the 1990 film Days of Thunder, but were not used for in-race footage. Sacks started 7th but finished 37th due to a broken crankshaft, while Stricklin started 27th place but finished 36th after withdrawing from the race.

=== Valleydale Meats 500 ===
The Valleydale Meats 500 was held on April 8 at Bristol International Raceway. Ernie Irvan won the pole.

Top-Ten Results:

1. #28 - Davey Allison*
2. #6 - Mark Martin
3. #5 - Ricky Rudd
4. #1 - Terry Labonte
5. #75 - Rick Wilson
6. #25 - Ken Schrader
7. #94 - Sterling Marlin*
8. #15 - Morgan Shepherd -1 lap
9. #17 - Darrell Waltrip -1 lap
10. #42 - Kyle Petty -1 lap

Failed to qualify: #19 - Chad Little, #16 - Larry Pearson

- Allison held off Mark Martin to win, by a margin of about 8 inches, making it one of the closest short track finishes in NASCAR history.
- Sterling Marlin was spun out with half a lap to go by Rudd. This resulted in a physical confrontation inside Rudd's transporter after the race.
- Dale Jarrett was hired to drive the #21 Ford for the Wood Brothers. Jarrett was originally intended to be a temporary relief driver, but became the permanent driver after Neil Bonnett developed a case of amnesia, which left him unable to race competitively.
- Harry Gant was forced to miss this race due to Gant attending his father's funeral. Rick Wilson was originally hired to drive Gant's #33 Oldsmobile, only for Wilson to give way to Phil Parsons for the actual race.

=== First Union 400 ===
The First Union 400 was held at North Wilkesboro Speedway on April 22, 1990. Mark Martin was the polesitter.

Top-Ten Results:

1. #26 - Brett Bodine*
2. #17 - Darrell Waltrip
3. #3 - Dale Earnhardt
4. #5 - Ricky Rudd
5. #15 - Morgan Shepherd
6. #6 - Mark Martin
7. #27 - Rusty Wallace
8. #11 - Geoff Bodine
9. #28 - Davey Allison
10. #42 - Kyle Petty -1 lap

Failed to qualify: #48 - Freddie Crawford, #70 - J. D. McDuffie, #76 - Bill Sedgwick

- This would be Brett Bodine first and only Cup Series victory, and it was the final victory for Buick in NASCAR.
- Bodine's victory remains one of the most controversial in NASCAR's modern era. It started after Kenny Wallace, who was making his Cup Series debut, crashed in turn one and brought out a caution on lap 320. During the yellow, the pace car erroneously picked up Dale Earnhardt as the leader, instead of Brett Bodine. This led to much confusion as to who was leading the race (NASCAR did not have electronic timing and scoring until 1993). Bodine had been waved around and was at the tail end of the line of cars, ostensibly the true race leader. Bodine's team was in fact in executing an "undercut" strategy (somewhat unfamiliar at the time), having pitted earlier on the previous stint (in order to gain track position with newer tires). With Bodine momentarily at the tail end of the line, the King Racing crew brought him into the pits for fresh tires. It took 18 caution laps to sort out the scoring error. Ultimately, the field was waved by until Bodine was the first car behind the pace car as the true leader. With the added advantage of fresh tires, Bodine cruised to victory. After the race, Darrell Waltrip, who finished second, protested the victory; however, it was turned down on the grounds that the decision to put Bodine in the lead was a judgment call that was unappealable under NASCAR rules.

=== Hanes Activewear 500 ===
The Hanes Activewear 500 was held on April 29 at Martinsville Speedway. Geoff Bodine won the pole.

Top-Ten Results:

1. #11 - Geoff Bodine
2. #27 - Rusty Wallace
3. #15 - Morgan Shepherd
4. #17 - Darrell Waltrip
5. #3 - Dale Earnhardt -1 lap
6. #25 - Ken Schrader -2 laps
7. #6 - Mark Martin -2 laps
8. #30 - Michael Waltrip -3 laps
9. #66 - Dick Trickle -3 laps
10. #9 - Bill Elliott -3 laps

Failed to qualify: none

=== Winston 500 ===
The Winston 500 was held on May 6 at Talladega Superspeedway. Bill Elliott won the pole.*

Top-Ten Results:

1. #3 - Dale Earnhardt
2. #18 - Greg Sacks
3. #6 - Mark Martin
4. #4 - Ernie Irvan
5. #30 - Michael Waltrip
6. #1 - Terry Labonte
7. #42 - Kyle Petty -1 lap
8. #15 - Morgan Shepherd -1 lap
9. #12 - Hut Stricklin -1 lap
10. #17 - Darrell Waltrip -1 lap

Failed to qualify: #70 - J. D. McDuffie, #80 - Jimmy Horton, #82 - Mark Stahl, #85 - Bobby Gerhart

- Bill Elliott's pole speed of 199.388 mph (48.027 seconds) is the fastest qualifying lap turned in the Winston Cup Series since restrictor plates began to be used at Daytona and Talladega.
- At one point in the race, an ESPN on-board camera caught footage of Dick Trickle smoking in his car during a caution period.

=== Winston Open ===
The Winston Open, a shootout race for drivers who are normally not eligible for The Winston, was held May 20 at Charlotte Motor Speedway with the winner transferring to The Winston later in the day. Ernie Irvan won the pole.

Top-Five Results:

1. #66 - Dick Trickle
2. #20 - Rob Moroso
3. #4 - Ernie Irvan
4. #94 - Sterling Marlin
5. #12 - Hut Stricklin

=== The Winston ===
The Winston was held May 20 at Charlotte Motor Speedway. Dale Earnhardt started on the pole.

Top-Ten Results:

1. #3 - Dale Earnhardt*
2. #25 - Ken Schrader
3. #6 - Mark Martin
4. #9 - Bill Elliott
5. #28 - Davey Allison
6. #66 - Dick Trickle
7. #33 - Harry Gant
8. #7 - Alan Kulwicki
9. #15 - Morgan Shepherd
10. #8 - Bobby Hillin Jr.
- Earnhardt led all 70 laps after starting from the pole position & won $325,000, becoming the first 2-time winner of the race.

=== Coca-Cola 600 ===
The Coca-Cola 600 was held May 27 at Charlotte Motor Speedway. Ken Schrader won the pole.

Top-Ten Results:

1. #27 - Rusty Wallace*
2. #9 - Bill Elliott
3. #6 - Mark Martin
4. #30 - Michael Waltrip
5. #4 - Ernie Irvan
6. #7 - Alan Kulwicki
7. #28 - Davey Allison
8. #15 - Morgan Shepherd
9. #10 - Derrike Cope
10. #11 - Geoff Bodine

Failed to qualify: #0 - Delma Cowart, #35 - Bill Venturini, #36 - H. B. Bailey, #38 - Dick Johnson, #52 - Jimmy Means, #53 - Jerry O'Neil, #70 - J. D. McDuffie, #74 - Mike Potter, #82 - Mark Stahl, #01 - Mickey Gibbs, #04 - Bill Meacham, #48 - Robin Best

- This was Wallace's only career victory in a crown jewel event (Daytona 500, Winston 500, Coca-Cola 600, and Southern 500).

=== Budweiser 500 ===
The Budweiser 500 was held at Dover Downs International Speedway on June 3, 1990. Dick Trickle won the pole.

Top-Ten Results:

1. #10 - Derrike Cope*
2. #25 - Ken Schrader
3. #66 - Dick Trickle
4. #6 - Mark Martin
5. #94 - Sterling Marlin
6. #15 - Morgan Shepherd*
7. #4 - Ernie Irvan
8. #9 - Bill Elliott
9. #42 - Kyle Petty
10. #27 - Rusty Wallace

Failed to qualify: none

- Footage from this race was used in the ESPN Home Video Racing Tough, hosted by Benny Parsons and Brett Bodine.
- After Dale Earnhardt blew his engine on lap 23, Earnhardt's crew performed the unheard-of feat of actually fixing a blown engine and getting the car back on the track. Earnhardt would blow the engine again later in the race, finishing 31st.
- This was Derrike Cope's 2nd and last Cup Series victory.
- As a result of both his consistency and Earnhardt's engine problems, Morgan Shepherd would briefly assume the points lead for the only time in his career.

=== Banquet Frozen Foods 300 ===
The Banquet Frozen Foods 300 was held June 10 at Sears Point Raceway. Ricky Rudd won the pole.

Top-Ten Results:

1. #27 - Rusty Wallace*
2. #6 - Mark Martin
3. #5 - Ricky Rudd
4. #11 - Geoff Bodine
5. #8 - Bobby Hillin Jr.
6. #94 - Sterling Marlin
7. #4 - Ernie Irvan
8. #0 - Irv Hoerr
9. #30 - Michael Waltrip
10. #75 - Rick Wilson

Failed to qualify: #52 - Jimmy Means, #84 - J. C. Danielson, #22 - St. James Davis, #03 - Mike Hickingbottom

- This was Rusty Wallace's fifth road course victory in the last seven races, finishing second in the other two.
- This was the final race victory for Blue Max Racing as the team would fold after Wallace left the team at the end of 1990.
- After finishing 29th due to a blown engine, the first time all season finishing outside the top-10, Morgan Shepherd lost the points lead to Mark Martin.

=== Miller Genuine Draft 500 ===
The Miller Genuine Draft 500 was held at Pocono International Raceway on June 17, 1990. Ernie Irvan started on the pole.

Top-Ten Results:

1. #33 - Harry Gant
2. #27 - Rusty Wallace
3. #11 - Geoff Bodine
4. #26 - Brett Bodine
5. #28 - Davey Allison
6. #12 - Hut Stricklin
7. #18 - Greg Sacks
8. #17 - Darrell Waltrip
9. #94 - Sterling Marlin
10. #42 - Kyle Petty

Failed to qualify: #74 - John Linville

- This race broke the record for most cars finishing on the lead lap, with 22 cars completing all 500 miles.

=== Miller Genuine Draft 400 ===
The Miller Genuine Draft 400 was held at Michigan International Speedway on June 24, 1990. Mark Martin won the pole via points as qualifying was rained out.

Top-Ten Results:

1. #3 - Dale Earnhardt
2. #4 - Ernie Irvan
3. #11 - Geoff Bodine
4. #6 - Mark Martin
5. #33 - Harry Gant
6. #7 - Alan Kulwicki
7. #1 - Terry Labonte
8. #42 - Kyle Petty
9. #5 - Ricky Rudd
10. #75 - Rick Wilson

Failed to qualify: #50 - Rich Vogler, #77 - Ken Ragan, #34 - Charlie Glotzbach

=== Pepsi 400 ===
The Pepsi 400 was held at Daytona International Speedway on July 7, 1990. Greg Sacks won the pole.

Top-Ten Results:

1. #3 - Dale Earnhardt*
2. #7 - Alan Kulwicki
3. #25 - Ken Schrader
4. #1 - Terry Labonte
5. #94 - Sterling Marlin
6. #8 - Bobby Hillin Jr.
7. #33 - Harry Gant
8. #21 - Dale Jarrett
9. #20 - Rob Moroso*
10. #42 - Kyle Petty -1 lap

Failed to qualify: #70 - J. D. McDuffie*, #72 - Tracy Leslie, #80 - Jimmy Horton*

- The race weekend was marred by a brutal practice crash involving Darrell Waltrip, who spun in oil, and was slammed into by Dave Marcis on the driver's side door. Waltrip suffered multiple leg fractures, a broken arm, 9 broken ribs, and a concussion, forcing him to miss the next 6 races. Marcis suffered a broken leg and had to borrow J. D. McDuffie's Pontiac to start the race. McDuffie relieved him after the pace lap.
- Jimmy Horton, who had failed to qualify for the race, was tapped to fill in for Waltrip at Daytona and was Waltrip's relief driver 2 weeks later at Pocono.
- As a result of Waltrip's crash, NASCAR thoroughly inspected Waltrip's car. Waltrip describes in his book, DW: A Lifetime Going Around in Circles, that the engine had a "floating block in the manifold that sat under the restrictor plate." This was not necessarily illegal, but it was not approved by NASCAR. NASCAR forced Hendrick Motorsports and other teams to weld the blocks into proper place.
- The Big One broke out at the end of the 1st lap, which involved 24 cars and took 11 cars immediately out of the race.
- Dale Earnhardt dominated the race and led 127 laps en route to his first Cup Series points race victory at Daytona.
- Shortly after the race, Earnhardt, Terry Labonte, Mark Martin, and Rusty Wallace all departed for Cleveland to compete in an IROC race that same afternoon.
- This race would mark Rob Moroso's only Top 10 finish in a points-paying race, as he was the last car on the lead lap in 9th place.

=== AC Spark Plug 500 ===
The AC Spark Plug 500 was held July 22 at Pocono Raceway. Mark Martin qualified on the top spot.

Top-Ten Results:

1. #11 - Geoff Bodine
2. #9 - Bill Elliott
3. #27 - Rusty Wallace
4. #3 - Dale Earnhardt
5. #28 - Davey Allison
6. #6 - Mark Martin
7. #5 - Ricky Rudd
8. #98 - Butch Miller
9. #43 - Richard Petty
10. #1 - Terry Labonte

Failed to qualify: #2 - Troy Beebe, #70 - J. D. McDuffie, #85 - Bobby Gerhart

Did not start: #50 - Rich Vogler*

- Rich Vogler was set to make his Winston Cup debut at this event as he had qualified 32nd for this race, but on the night before, he was killed in a sprint car race at Salem Speedway.
- Darrell Waltrip actually started the race in the #17, and pulled in to put Jimmy Horton in the car at the end of the 1st lap. NASCAR official Dick Beaty stated the day before that he wanted Darrell to stay at the back of the field, do not pass anybody, and pull in at the end of the 1st lap for the driver change. Waltrip passed 3 or 4 cars at the start, then caught a caution that allowed him to do the driver change under yellow. Beaty then penalized the #17 1 lap for disobeying the earlier command.

=== DieHard 500 ===
The DieHard 500 was held July 29, 1990, at Talladega Superspeedway. Dale Earnhardt won the pole.

Top-Ten Results:

1. #3 - Dale Earnhardt*
2. #9 - Bill Elliott
3. #94 - Sterling Marlin
4. #7 - Alan Kulwicki
5. #5 - Ricky Rudd
6. #4 - Ernie Irvan
7. #10 - Derrike Cope
8. #42 - Kyle Petty
9. #6 - Mark Martin
10. #8 - Bobby Hillin Jr. -1 lap

Failed to qualify: #0 - Delma Cowart, #70 - J. D. McDuffie, #77 - Ken Ragan

- Earnhardt's victory made it three of four major superspeedway titles in the 1990 season by winning the pole, leading a record-breaking 134 laps and winning the race. As of 2022, this marks the only time in NASCAR history that a driver won 3 straight restrictor plate races.
- A scary pit road incident occurred when Stanley Smith lost control of his car and hit several crew members for Tracy Leslie's team. No one was seriously injured.
- Jimmy Spencer was involved in a scary last lap crash with Ken Schrader, which resulted in Spencer's car flipping onto its roof. The crash brought the caution out as the leaders exited turn 4. The crash was never revealed by the CBS commentators, was never shown on the broadcast and no known footage of the crash exists, with only a few photographs showing the accident. Despite flipping the car, Spencer drove away, and managed to still finish 24th, 2 laps down.

=== Budweiser at The Glen ===
The Budweiser at The Glen was held at Watkins Glen International on August 12, 1990. Dale Earnhardt won the pole.

Top-Ten Results:

1. #5 - Ricky Rudd
2. #11 - Geoff Bodine
3. #26 - Brett Bodine
4. #30 - Michael Waltrip
5. #6 - Mark Martin
6. #15 - Morgan Shepherd
7. #3 - Dale Earnhardt
8. #40 - Tommy Kendall
9. #25 - Ken Schrader
10. #0 - Irv Hoerr

Failed to qualify: #93 - Troy Beebe

- After finishing the race in 11th, Alan Kulwicki's Ford caught fire, forcing Alan to bail out just past the start-finish line.
- Originally, Rick Hendrick was scheduled to race the event. Instead, South African sports car racer Sarel van der Merwe substituted for Darrell Waltrip in the #17. He finished in 24th place after crashing late in the race. At the time, van der Merwe was racing for Rick Hendrick's Camel GT team in IMSA.
- Future NASCAR team owner Rick Ware made his only career Cup Series start as a driver in this race. Ware's #22 Pontiac started 35th and finished 36th.

=== Champion Spark Plug 400 ===
The Champion Spark Plug 400 was held on August 19, 1990, at Michigan International Speedway. Alan Kulwicki won the pole.

Top-Ten Results:

1. #6 - Mark Martin
2. #17 - Greg Sacks
3. #27 - Rusty Wallace
4. #9 - Bill Elliott
5. #5 - Ricky Rudd
6. #28 - Davey Allison
7. #11 - Geoff Bodine
8. #3 - Dale Earnhardt
9. #15 - Morgan Shepherd
10. #21 - Dale Jarrett

Failed to qualify: #34 - Charlie Glotzbach, #36 - H. B. Bailey, #70 - J. D. McDuffie, #72 - Tracy Leslie

=== Busch 500 ===
The Busch 500 was held August 25, 1990, at Bristol International Raceway. Dale Earnhardt won the pole.

Top-Ten Results:

1. #4 - Ernie Irvan*
2. #27 - Rusty Wallace
3. #6 - Mark Martin
4. #1 - Terry Labonte
5. #94 - Sterling Marlin
6. #7 - Alan Kulwicki
7. #21 - Dale Jarrett -1 lap
8. #3 - Dale Earnhardt -1 lap
9. #30 - Michael Waltrip -1 lap
10. #5 - Ricky Rudd -1 lap

Failed to qualify: #19 - Chad Little, #70 - J. D. McDuffie, #74 - Mike Potter

- This was the first Cup Series victory for Ernie Irvan, and for Morgan-McClure Motorsports.

=== Heinz Southern 500 ===
The Heinz Southern 500 was held on September 2, 1990, at Darlington Raceway. Dale Earnhardt won the pole.

Top-Ten Results:

1. #3 - Dale Earnhardt*
2. #4 - Ernie Irvan
3. #7 - Alan Kulwicki
4. #9 - Bill Elliott
5. #33 - Harry Gant
6. #6 - Mark Martin
7. #5 - Ricky Rudd
8. #11 - Geoff Bodine
9. #10 - Derrike Cope -1 lap
10. #26 - Brett Bodine -1 lap

Failed to qualify: #70 - J. D. McDuffie

- Earnhardt came back from a lost lap, and dealt with a vibrating tire and an ill-handling car to win, also winning $200,000. With this victory, Dale became the first race car driver in history to surpass $11,000,000 career winnings.
- This was the final time Dale Earnhardt won from the pole.
- During the race, Morgan Shepherd and Ken Schrader made contact, sending Schrader into the wall. An angry Schrader returned to the race and rammed Shepherd into the wall, knocking both drivers out of the race.

=== Miller Genuine Draft 400 ===
The Miller Genuine Draft 400 was held September 9, 1990, at Richmond International Raceway. Ernie Irvan won the pole.

Top-Ten Results:

1. #3 - Dale Earnhardt
2. #6 - Mark Martin
3. #17 - Darrell Waltrip*
4. #9 - Bill Elliott
5. #27 - Rusty Wallace
6. #42 - Kyle Petty
7. #66 - Dick Trickle
8. #5 - Ricky Rudd -1 lap
9. #11 - Geoff Bodine -1 lap
10. #25 - Ken Schrader -1 lap

Failed to qualify: #70 - J. D. McDuffie, #47 - Jack Pennington, #13 - Kerry Teague

- This would be the final fall Richmond race that would be run in the daytime.
- This was Darrell Waltrip's first full race back from his injuries suffered at Daytona in July.

=== Peak AntiFreeze 500 ===
The Peak AntiFreeze 500 was held at Dover Downs International Speedway on September 16. Bill Elliott won the pole

Top-Ten Results:

1. #9 - Bill Elliott
2. #6 - Mark Martin
3. #3 - Dale Earnhardt
4. #33 - Harry Gant -1 lap
5. #30 - Michael Waltrip -1 lap
6. #21 - Dale Jarrett -1 lap
7. #27 - Rusty Wallace -1 lap
8. #42 - Kyle Petty -1 lap
9. #28 - Davey Allison -1 lap
10. #25 - Ken Schrader -2 laps

Failed to qualify: #13 - Kerry Teague

=== Goody's 500 ===
The Goody's 500 was held at Martinsville Speedway on September 23. Mark Martin won the pole.

Top-ten results:

1. #11 - Geoff Bodine
2. #3 - Dale Earnhardt
3. #6 - Mark Martin
4. #26 - Brett Bodine
5. #33 - Harry Gant
6. #7 - Alan Kulwicki
7. #28 - Davey Allison
8. #9 - Bill Elliott
9. #1 - Terry Labonte -2 laps
10. #21 - Dale Jarrett -3 laps

Failed to qualify: #2 - Ron Esau, #70 - J. D. McDuffie

=== Tyson Holly Farms 400 ===
The Tyson Holly Farms 400 was held September 30 at North Wilkesboro Speedway. Kyle Petty won the pole.

Top-Ten Results:

1. #6 - Mark Martin
2. #3 - Dale Earnhardt
3. #26 - Brett Bodine
4. #9 - Bill Elliott
5. #25 - Ken Schrader
6. #4 - Ernie Irvan
7. #17 - Darrell Waltrip
8. #27 - Rusty Wallace
9. #7 - Alan Kulwicki
10. #42 - Kyle Petty -1 lap

Failed to qualify: #2 - Ron Esau, #40 - Tommy Kendall, #41 - Larry Pearson, #47 - Jack Pennington, #70 - J. D. McDuffie

- With the victory, Martin retained his 16-point advantage in the Winston Cup Championship race. Two pit stops to remove spring rubber left him in 12th place on lap 196, but by lap 288 he was in second place. On lap 263, Martin was the only driver to pass Earnhardt under green.
- The race would later be marked by tragedy, as rookie driver Rob Moroso, who finished in 21st place in this race, would be killed in a highway accident hours after this race had concluded. Police reports said that Moroso was above the legal alcohol limit when he crashed.

=== Mello Yello 500 ===
The Mello Yello 500 was held on October 7 at Charlotte Motor Speedway. Brett Bodine won the pole.

Top-Ten Results:

1. #28 - Davey Allison
2. #15 - Morgan Shepherd
3. #30 - Michael Waltrip
4. #42 - Kyle Petty
5. #7 - Alan Kulwicki
6. #5 - Ricky Rudd
7. #10 - Derrike Cope
8. #26 - Brett Bodine
9. #17 - Darrell Waltrip
10. #21 - Dale Jarrett -1 lap

Failed to qualify: #13 - Mike Skinner, #65 - Dave Mader III, #89 - Rodney Combs, #64 - Gary Wright, #40 - Tommy Kendall, #13 - Kerry Teague, #70 - J. D. McDuffie, #74 - Mike Potter, #93 - Troy Beebe, #72 - Tracy Leslie, #53 - Jerry O'Neil, #36 - H. B. Bailey, #54 - Bob Schacht, #0 - Delma Cowart, #04 - Bill Meacham, #35 - Bill Venturini.

- During a caution, Dale Earnhardt lost all four tires at the end of pit road after a pit stop communication mix-up. Earnhardt's pit crew ran down pit lane with jacks and got him back on all fours but he lost a few laps. Despite the actions of the crew being against the rules, no penalty was assessed.

=== AC Delco 500 ===
The AC Delco 500 was held October 21 at North Carolina Speedway. Ken Schrader won the pole.

Top-Ten Results:

1. #7 - Alan Kulwicki
2. #9 - Bill Elliott
3. #33 - Harry Gant
4. #11 - Geoff Bodine
5. #25 - Ken Schrader
6. #94 - Sterling Marlin -1 lap
7. #5 - Ricky Rudd -1 lap
8. #17 - Darrell Waltrip -1 lap
9. #4 - Ernie Irvan -2 laps
10. #3 - Dale Earnhardt -2 laps

Failed to qualify: #0 - Delma Cowart, #48 - James Hylton, #70 - J. D. McDuffie, #82 - Mark Stahl

- With both finishing three laps down, Dale Earnhardt gained five points on Mark Martin in the Winston Cup Championship race, though Martin still held a 45-point lead with two races remaining.

=== Checker 500 ===
The Checker 500 was held November 4, 1990, at Phoenix International Raceway. Rusty Wallace won the pole.

Top-Ten Results:

1. #3 - Dale Earnhardt*
2. #25 - Ken Schrader
3. #15 - Morgan Shepherd
4. #17 - Darrell Waltrip
5. #9 - Bill Elliott
6. #7 - Alan Kulwicki
7. #98 - Rick Mast
8. #11 - Geoff Bodine
9. #4 - Ernie Irvan
10. #6 - Mark Martin

Failed to qualify: #04 - Hershel McGriff, #34 - Ted Kennedy, #24 - Butch Gilliland, #61 - Rick Scribner, #44 - Jack Sellers, #22 - St. James Davis

- Dale Earnhardt's victory allowed him to retake the points lead by 6 points over Mark Martin heading into the season finale at Atlanta.
- This was the first season since 1987 where Dale Earnhardt won the most races in a season. 1990 was also the final season in his career that he won the most races in a season.

=== Atlanta Journal 500 ===
The final race of the season was held on November 18, 1990, at Atlanta Motor Speedway. Rusty Wallace won the pole.

Top-Ten Results:

1. #15 - Morgan Shepherd
2. #11 - Geoff Bodine
3. #3 - Dale Earnhardt*
4. #21 - Dale Jarrett
5. #17 - Darrell Waltrip
6. #6 - Mark Martin*
7. #4 - Ernie Irvan
8. #7 - Alan Kulwicki
9. #27 - Rusty Wallace
10. #18 - Greg Sacks -1 lap

Failed to qualify: #82 - Mark Stahl

- Dale Earnhardt's 3rd-place finish allowed him to win the 1990 Winston Cup Series championship by 26 points over Mark Martin.
- Martin's 46-point penalty at Richmond in February would be the deciding factor in the championship. If the penalty was never issued, Martin would've won by 20 points over Earnhardt.
- Tragedy struck during the race when Ricky Rudd lost control of the car on pit road, and spun into Bill Elliott's pit stall, striking and killing tire changer Mike Ritch.
- Ritch's death resulted in a wave of new pit road procedures in the Winston Cup Series.
  - At this time, pit road had no speed limit, which meant that cars would blast down pit road in order to lose a least amount of time. Drivers were essentially waved into their pit stall by a sign board man who would stand out in pit lane holding up their team's pit board. In addition, pit road was not closed when the caution was first displayed, which would result in cars rushing into the pits before the pace car picked up the field. This was first curtailed by the banning of tire changes under caution, an extremely unpopular move (all other services were still allowed though). The pit road closing procedures (that continue today in a modified form) also began with this pit procedure. New rules for pit crews that required crews to stay on the other side of the pit wall from the cars until their car was one stall away were instituted.
  - Pit board men were no longer allowed to stand out in the middle of the pit lane. Lollipops, similar to what is used in most other motorsports, were dangled out over the pit stall from the other side of the pit wall.
  - In addition, each car was issued either a blue (with a white number 1 on it) or orange sticker (with a white number 2 on it). The odd numbered cars got the blue stickers while the even numbered cars got the orange stickers. Once the green flag came back out, the blue flag was put out at the end of the second lap after the restart, which allowed only the odd-numbered cars to pit for tires. At the end of the third lap after the restart, an orange flag was displayed, allowing only even-numbered cars to pit for tires. This procedure only lasted a few races before it was dumped in favor of pit road speed limits.

=== NASCAR Christmas 400 ===
After a year off, the NASCAR Australian Exhibition was run for a third and final time at the Calder Park Thunderdome in Melbourne, Australia. The race counted as the second round of the 1991 Victorian Health Australian NASCAR Championships season. Dick Trickle won the pole.

Top-Ten Results

1. #94 - Terry Labonte
2. #12 - Ken Schrader
3. #56 - Ron Esau
4. #09 - Terry Fisher
5. #05 - Clay Young
6. #11 - Robin Best
7. #23 - Ian Thomas
8. #73 - Phil Barkdoll -1 lap
9. #5 - Max Dumesny -1 lap
10. #26 - Terry Byers -1 lap

Failed to qualify: #14 - Gene Cook, #22 - Barry Graham, #31 - Craig Lawless, #71 - Winston Badcock, #86 - Trevor Oliver

- 24 of the 36 drivers that entered the race were Australian. The 'visiting' American drivers were a mix of those from the Winston Cup and Winston West Series.
- The race was scheduled for around 400 kilometers, but was shortened to 205.856 (112 laps) due to rain.

== Full Drivers' Championship ==
(key) Bold – Pole position awarded by time. Italics – Pole position set by owner's points. * – Most laps led.

Pos	Driver	DAY	RCH	CAR	ATL	DAR	BRI	NWS	MAR	TAL	CLT	DOV	SON	POC	MCH	DAY	POC	TAL	GLN	MCH	BRI	DAR	RCH	DOV	MAR	NWS	CLT	CAR	PHO	ATL	Pts
1	Dale Earnhardt	5*	2	10	1*	1	19	3	5	1*	30	31	34	13	1	1*	4	**1***	**7**	8	**8***	**1***	1*	3	2	2*	25	10	1*	3	4430
2	Mark Martin	21	1	26	5	2	2	**6**	7	3	3	4	2	14	4	11	**6**	9	5	1*	3	6	2	2	**3**	1	14	11	10	6	4404
3	Geoff Bodine	9	33	2	7	**4***	24	8	**1***	24	10	15	4	3	3	25	1*	17	2	7	11	8	9	36	1	16	36	4	8	2	4017
4	Bill Elliott	3	4	33	12	7	17	18	10	**22**	2	8	21	16	25*	29	2	2	12	4	13	4	4	**1***	8	4	15*	2	5	15*	3999
5	Morgan Shepherd	10	7	7	2	5	8	5	3	8	8	6	29	11	13	34	36	26	6	9	31	21	30	25	25	12	2	12	3	1	3689
6	Rusty Wallace	7	6*	5	24	18	28	7	2	20	1*	10*	1*	2	17	14	3	32	34*	3	2	40	5	7	15	8	38	32	**38**	**9**	3676
7	Ricky Rudd	4	**3**	31	27	24	3	4	23	33	28	11	**3**	32	9	13	7	5	1	5	10	7	8	32	28*	11	6	7	32	16	3601
8	Alan Kulwicki	35	24	27	8	23	31	11	25	13	6	24	11	34	6	2	17	4	11	**11**	6	3	26	29	6	9	5	1	6	8	3599
9	Ernie Irvan	13	22	29	3	32	**16**	16	15	4	5	7	7	**17**	2	33	26	6	28	35	1	2	**12**	26	11	6	27	9	9	7	3593
10	Ken Schrader	**40**	10	3	4	10	6	19	6	28	**11**	2	18	15	27	3	11	16	9	40	12	39	10	10	27	5	35	**5**	2	11	3572
11	Kyle Petty	24	11	**1***	6	13	10	10	16	7	17	9	16	10	8	10	35	8	17	16	28	25	6	8	23	**10**	4	20*	41	41	3501
12	Brett Bodine	17	8	25	11	8	22	1*	12	12	29	18	41	4	14	22	16	33	3	17	25	10	31	20	4	3	**8**	17	15	18	3440
13	Davey Allison	20	20	34	13	3	1	9	22	25	7	17	24	5	36	24	5	20	19	6	23	15	16	9	7	26	1	29	11	25	3423
14	Sterling Marlin	19	13	4	10	28	7	31	32	26	35	5	6	9	18	5	30	3	15	20	5	18	24	12	12	13	16	6	16	38	3387
15	Terry Labonte	2	32	9	40	14	4	15	31	6	13	13	35	20	7	4	10	42	14	14	4	14	17	15	9	27	17	13	13	21	3371
16	Michael Waltrip	8	27	28	38	9	20	27	8	5	4	26	9	19	21	16	23	21	4	30	9	26	14	5	30	15	3	15	43	14	3251
17	Harry Gant	18	36	11	9	6		13	26	36	25	34	19	1	5	7	14	15	21	13	26	5	36	4	5	28	26	3	37	19	3182
18	Derrike Cope	1	29	12	29	27	32	21	17	40	9	1	13	12	12	28	13	7	35	19	27	9	35	13	24	22	7	33	14	12	3140
19	Bobby Hillin Jr.	6	31	17	16	12	21	30	21	23	34	16	5	29	28	6	12	10	16	21	15	31	11	14	26	14	31	14	42	22	3048
20	Darrell Waltrip	14	12	6	26	11	9*	2	4	10	22	19	33	8	15	QL	20						3	19	19	7	9	8	4	5	3013
21	Dave Marcis	23	17	22	22	15	15	12	14	14	16	35	32	22	19	20	28	28	31	18	19	16	15	22	14	25	13	23	17	34	2944
22	Dick Trickle	12	5	23	14	22	13	24	9	27	12	**3**	39	25	24	19	15	36	30	32	17	11	7	23	22	29	30	36	40	37	2863
23	Rick Wilson	30	30	18	17	29	5	22	27	39	19	23	10	35	10	39	31	35	32	29	32	12	20	27	20	18	11	18	19	33	2666
24	Jimmy Spencer	15	9	8	15	25	18	20	11	32	21	32	27	30	20	15	19	24	29	25	18	23	27	18	18	23	41				2579
25	Dale Jarrett						11	14	30	34	32	12	14	31	34	8	18	39	20	10	7	28	29	6	10	19	10	16	30	4	2558
26	Richard Petty	34	35	32	25	21	26	29	20	29	27	21	26	38	11	36	9	29	18	33	29	34	21	16	29	17	20	21	23	17	2556
27	Butch Miller	22	28	13	20	17	14	25	18	16	18	14	31	23	23	23	8	34	25	12	16	29	19	17							2377
28	Hut Stricklin	33			37	36				9	37	27	12	6	32	26	29	14	23	15	21	20	13	11	13	20	29	34	26	13	2316
29	Jimmy Means	29	18	21	31	31	29	28	19	21	DNQ	22	DNQ	27	39	12	21	30	39	27	22	36	18	24	16	30	39	28	25	28	2271
30	Rob Moroso **(R)**	38	15	30	33	26	30	32	13	37	26	29	42	36	16	9	32	12	13	26	30	13	28	28	21	21					2184
31	Rick Mast		21	19	35	39	12	23	29	17	31	28					22			36	24	24			31	32	34	22	7	29	1719
32	Greg Sacks				DNQ	37				2	14			7	26	**37**	33	18	40	2	20	30	23	21			Wth		12	10	1663
33	Chad Little	DNQ	16		19	16	DNQ			15	24		37	18		27		19		22	DNQ	35	32		17	24	40	25	21	27	1632
34	Jack Pennington **(R)**	25			30	20				11	20			21	38	18		23		38		22	DNQ			DNQ	12	24		36	1278
35	Larry Pearson	27	23	20	34		DNQ				42										14	17				DNQ	19	19			822
36	Jimmy Horton	37								DNQ	23	20		39		17		13						30			23			35	756
37	Mickey Gibbs	DNQ	19	15	39	38				19	DNQ				DNQ	32		22					34				21				755
38	Mike Alexander	41	14	16	23	19	23	17																							682
39	Phil Parsons	42	26	14			25			35					22			41				19					18				632
40	J. D. McDuffie	DNQ	DNQ	35	DNQ	35	27	DNQ		DNQ	DNQ	25		28	37	DNQ	DNQ	DNQ	22	DNQ	DNQ	DNQ	DNQ	40	DNQ	DNQ	DNQ	DNQ			557
41	Buddy Baker				21	40				31	15					30		40		23							37				498
42	Lake Speed	16			DNQ					38	38				33			11				32		QL							479
43	Neil Bonnett	11	25	36	18	30																									455
44	Mark Stahl	DNQ		24	28	DNQ				DNQ	DNQ					DNQ		31				33					32	DNQ		DNQ	371
45	Bill Venturini	DNQ								18	DNQ				30			25		28							DNQ				349
46	Rodney Combs	DNQ									33				40					34							DNQ		27	30	323
47	Tommy Kendall												38						8							DNQ	DNQ	26			281
48	Irv Hoerr												8						10												281
49	Ted Musgrave																			39								37	22	26	280
50	Chuck Bown																										24		24	23	276
51	Jerry O'Neil **(R)**	31	DNQ		DNQ						DNQ			40			34		26								DNQ				259
52	Bill Sedgwick							DNQ	24				36																20		249
53	Tommy Riggins													26			37		33					39							247
54	Eddie Bierschwale	32													29												22				240
55	Jeff Purvis **(R)**								28															33		31		38	36		238
56	Ken Ragan	DNQ			36						41				DNQ		24	DNQ		37											238
57	Mike Chase												25							24									39		230
58	Jim Sauter	DNQ												24										34						31	222
59	Bill Schmitt												20																18		212
60	Mike Potter	DNQ				DNQ					DNQ	30					25				DNQ			38			DNQ				210
61	Jim Bown												22															27	28	39	207
62	A. J. Foyt	36			DNQ											38		27													191
63	Phil Barkdoll	39								30						31															189
64	Dick Johnson					34					DNQ						39		27												189
65	H. B. Bailey				32	33					DNQ									DNQ		38					DNQ				180
66	Bobby Hamilton										39																28			40	168
67	John Krebs												23																31		164
68	Philip Duffie	DNQ														21						37									152
69	Tracy Leslie										36					DNQ		38		DNQ							DNQ	39			150
70	Charlie Glotzbach	DNQ													DNQ	35				DNQ		27	22								140
71	Troy Beebe												30	37	31		DNQ		DNQ								DNQ		35		131
72	Terry Fisher												15																DNQ		118
73	Randy LaJoie													33			38														113
74	Stan Barrett	DNQ											17																		112
75	Dave Mader III																										DNQ			20	103
76	Edward Cooper														35					41											98
77	Charlie Baker			37																								40			95
78	Steve Grissom																													24	91
79	Sarel van der Merwe																		24												91
80	Ron Esau																						25		DNQ	DNQ			DNQ		88
81	Joe Ruttman	26																													85
82	Kenny Wallace				DNQ			26																							85
83	Brian Ross																27														82
84	Rich Bickle	28																													79
85	Butch Gilliland												28																DNQ		79
86	Brent Kaeding																												29		76
87	Rick Jeffrey																											30			73
88	Jimmy Hensley																										33	31			70
89	Ben Hess																			31											70
90	Pancho Carter																													32	67
91	Gary Collins																												33		64
92	Bobby Gerhart	DNQ								DNQ		33					DNQ														64
93	D. K. Ulrich																						33								64
94	Bill Meacham		34								DNQ																DNQ				61
95	Mark Reed																												34		61
96	Mike Skinner																										DNQ	35			58
97	Rick Ware																		36												55
98	Jerry Hufflin																							37							52
99	Oma Kimbrough																		37												52
100	Stanley Smith									Wth								37													52
101	John Alexander																		38												49
102	J. T. Hayes			38																											49
103	Terry Byers										40					40															43
104	Ted Kennedy												43																DNQ		34
105	Hershel McGriff												44																DNQ		31
106	Tommy Ellis		DNQ																					31							
107	James Hylton																							35				DNQ			
108	Freddie Crawford							DNQ				36																			
109	Jack Sellers												40																DNQ		
110	Trevor Boys	DNQ																													
111	Mark Gibson	DNQ																													
112	Blackie Wangerin	DNQ																													
113	Dennis Langston	DNQ																													
114	Joe Booher	DNQ																													
115	Delma Cowart	DNQ			DNQ						DNQ							DNQ									DNQ	DNQ			
116	Keith Thomas				DNQ																										
117	Norm Benning					DNQ																									
118	Robin Best										DNQ																				
119	Mike Hickingbottom												DNQ																		
120	J. C. Danielson												DNQ																		
121	St. James Davis												DNQ																DNQ		
122	John Linville													DNQ																	
123	Rich Vogler														DNQ		40														
124	Kerry Teague																						DNQ	DNQ			DNQ				
125	Gary Wright																										DNQ				
126	Bob Schacht																										DNQ				
127	Rick Scribner																												DNQ		
128	Bob Walker																												DNQ		
129	Robert Sprague																												DNQ		
130	Rick Mackey																												DNQ		
131	Doug Heveron	Wth																													
Pos	Driver	DAY	RCH	CAR	ATL	DAR	BRI	NWS	MAR	TAL	CLT	DOV	SON	POC	MCH	DAY	POC	TAL	GLN	MCH	BRI	DAR	RCH	DOV	MAR	NWS	CLT	CAR	PHO	ATL	Pts

== Rookie of the Year ==
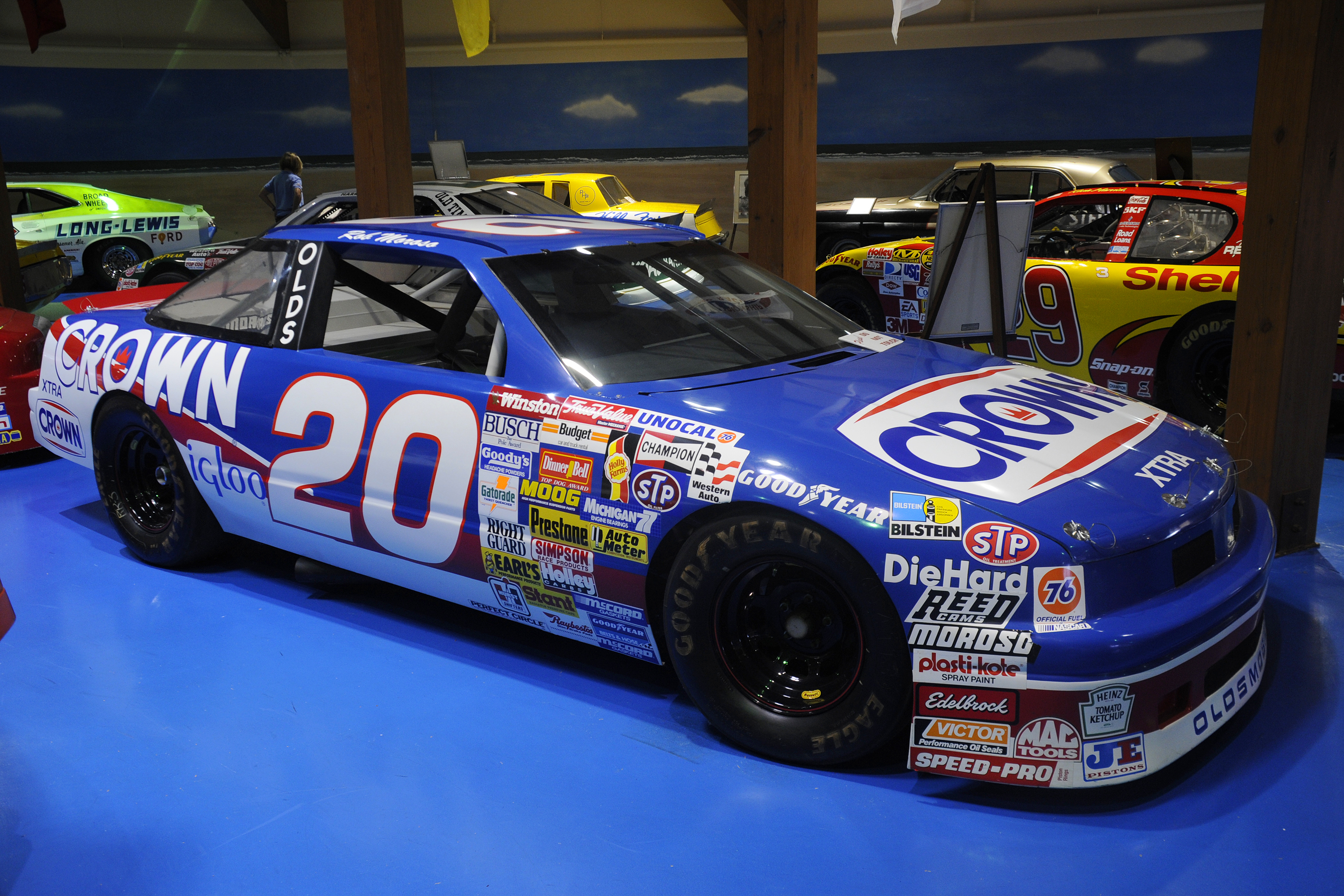
Rob Moroso's 1990 Oldsmobile

The 1990 season was a slim season for Rookie of the Year contenders. 1989 Busch Series champion Rob Moroso had a top-ten finish and qualified for every race, but he was killed in a car crash before the end of the year and was awarded the top rookie award posthumously. His top runner-up was Jack Pennington, a late-model dirt racing champion, who had 16 starts and no top-tens in an unsponsored car. The only other declarees were Jerry O'Neil and Jeff Purvis, who did not run enough races to be completely eligible for the honor.

== See also ==
- 1990 NASCAR Busch Series
- 1990 NASCAR Winston West Series
