= 1988 Budweiser 500 =

11th race of the 1988 NASCAR Winston Cup Series

Race details
- Race 11 of 29 in the 1988 NASCAR Winston Cup Series
- The 1988 Budweiser 500 program cover, featuring Terry Labonte.
- Date: June 5, 1988
- Official name: 20th Annual Budweiser 500
- Location: Dover, Delaware, Dover Downs International Speedway
- Course: Permanent racing facility
- Course length: 1 miles (1.6 km)
- Distance: 500 laps, 500 mi (804.672 km)
- Scheduled distance: 500 laps, 500 mi (804.672 km)
- Average speed: 118.726 miles per hour (191.071 km/h)
- Attendance: 61,000

Pole position
Driver	Alan Kulwicki	AK Racing
- Time: 24.543

Most laps led
Driver	Bill Elliott	Melling Racing
- Laps: 203

Winner
No. 9	Bill Elliott	Melling Racing

Television in the United States
- Network: ESPN
- Announcers: Bob Jenkins, Ned Jarrett, Gary Nelson

Radio in the United States
- Radio: Motor Racing Network

The 1988 Budweiser 500 was the 11th stock car race of the 1988 NASCAR Winston Cup Series season and the 20th iteration of the event. The race was held on Sunday, June 5, 1988, before an audience of 61,000 in Dover, Delaware at Dover Downs International Speedway, a 1-mile (1.6 km) permanent oval-shaped racetrack. The race took the scheduled 500 laps to complete. Coming back from a near two-lap deficit, Melling Racing driver Bill Elliott would manage to dominate the latter stages of the race, leading 203 laps to take his 25th career NASCAR Winston Cup Series victory and his second victory of the season. To fill out the top three, Morgan Shepherd a replacement driver for Jackson Bros. Motorsports driver Harry Gant, and Blue Max Racing driver Rusty Wallace would finish second and third, respectively.

== Background ==
The layout of Dover Downs International Speedway, the venue where the race was held.

Dover Downs International Speedway is an oval race track in Dover, Delaware, United States that has held at least two NASCAR races since it opened in 1969. In addition to NASCAR, the track also hosted USAC and the NTT IndyCar Series. The track features one layout, a 1-mile (1.6 km) concrete oval, with 24° banking in the turns and 9° banking on the straights. The speedway is owned and operated by Dover Motorsports.

The track, nicknamed "The Monster Mile", was built in 1969 by Melvin Joseph of Melvin L. Joseph Construction Company, Inc., with an asphalt surface, but was replaced with concrete in 1995. Six years later in 2001, the track's capacity moved to 135,000 seats, making the track have the largest capacity of sports venue in the mid-Atlantic. In 2002, the name changed to Dover International Speedway from Dover Downs International Speedway after Dover Downs Gaming and Entertainment split, making Dover Motorsports. From 2007 to 2009, the speedway worked on an improvement project called "The Monster Makeover", which expanded facilities at the track and beautified the track. After the 2014 season, the track's capacity was reduced to 95,500 seats.

=== Entry list ===
- (R) denotes rookie driver.

#	Driver	Team	Make	Sponsor
2	Ernie Irvan (R)	U.S. Racing	Chevrolet	Kroger
3	Dale Earnhardt	Richard Childress Racing	Chevrolet	GM Goodwrench Service
4	Rick Wilson	Morgan–McClure Motorsports	Oldsmobile	Kodak
5	Geoff Bodine	Hendrick Motorsports	Chevrolet	Levi Garrett
6	Mark Martin	Roush Racing	Ford	Stroh Light
7	Alan Kulwicki	AK Racing	Ford	Zerex
8	Bobby Hillin Jr.	Stavola Brothers Racing	Buick	Miller High Life
9	Bill Elliott	Melling Racing	Ford	Coors Light
10	Ken Bouchard (R)	Whitcomb Racing	Ford	Whitcomb Racing
11	Terry Labonte	Junior Johnson & Associates	Chevrolet	Budweiser
12	Bobby Allison	Stavola Brothers Racing	Buick	Miller High Life
15	Brett Bodine	Bud Moore Engineering	Ford	Crisco
17	Darrell Waltrip	Hendrick Motorsports	Chevrolet	Tide
21	Kyle Petty	Wood Brothers Racing	Ford	Citgo
23	Eddie Bierschwale	B&B Racing	Oldsmobile	Wayne Paging
25	Ken Schrader	Hendrick Motorsports	Chevrolet	Folgers
26	Ricky Rudd	King Racing	Buick	Quaker State
27	Rusty Wallace	Blue Max Racing	Pontiac	Kodiak
28	Davey Allison	Ranier-Lundy Racing	Ford	Havoline
29	Dale Jarrett	Cale Yarborough Motorsports	Oldsmobile	Hardee's
30	Michael Waltrip	Bahari Racing	Pontiac	Country Time
31	Joe Ruttman	Bob Clark Motorsports	Oldsmobile	Slender You Figure Salons
33	Morgan Shepherd	Mach 1 Racing	Chevrolet	Skoal Bandit
41	Joe Booher	Booher Racing	Chevrolet	Everride Radiator
43	Richard Petty	Petty Enterprises	Pontiac	STP
44	Sterling Marlin	Hagan Racing	Oldsmobile	Piedmont Airlines
52	Jimmy Means	Jimmy Means Racing	Pontiac	Eureka
55	Phil Parsons	Jackson Bros. Motorsports	Oldsmobile	Crown, Skoal Classic
67	Buddy Arrington	Arrington Racing	Ford	Pannill Sweatshirts
68	Derrike Cope	Testa Racing	Ford	Purolator Filters
70	J. D. McDuffie	McDuffie Racing	Pontiac	Rumple Furniture
71	Dave Marcis	Marcis Auto Racing	Chevrolet	Lifebuoy
75	Neil Bonnett	RahMoc Enterprises	Pontiac	Valvoline
78	Jay Sommers	Sommers Racing	Chevrolet	Doe & Associates
80	Jimmy Horton (R)	S&H Racing	Ford	S&H Racing
83	Lake Speed	Speed Racing	Oldsmobile	Wynn's, Kmart
88	Buddy Baker	Baker-Schiff Racing	Oldsmobile	Red Baron Frozen Pizza
90	Benny Parsons	Donlavey Racing	Ford	Bull's-Eye Barbecue Sauce
96	Dana Patten	Patten Racing	Buick	U.S. Chrome
97	Rodney Combs	Winkle Motorsports	Buick	AC Spark Plug
98	Brad Noffsinger (R)	Curb Racing	Buick	Sunoco

== Qualifying ==
Qualifying was split into two rounds. The first round was held on Friday, June 3, at 3:00 PM EST. Each driver would have one lap to set a time. During the first round, the top 20 drivers in the round would be guaranteed a starting spot in the race. If a driver was not able to guarantee a spot in the first round, they had the option to scrub their time from the first round and try and run a faster lap time in a second round qualifying run, held on Saturday, June 4, at 11:30 AM EST. As with the first round, each driver would have one lap to set a time. For this specific race, positions 21-40 would be decided on time, and depending on who needed it, a select amount of positions were given to cars who had not otherwise qualified but were high enough in owner's points; up to two provisionals were given.

Alan Kulwicki, driving for his own AK Racing team, would win the pole, setting a time of 24.543 and an average speed of 146.681 miles per hour (236.060 km/h) in the first round.

Buddy Arrington was the only driver to fail to qualify.

=== Full qualifying results ===
Pos.	#	Driver	Team	Make	Time	Speed
1	7	Alan Kulwicki	AK Racing	Ford	24.543	146.681
2	6	Mark Martin	Roush Racing	Ford	24.555	146.610
3	4	Rick Wilson	Morgan–McClure Motorsports	Oldsmobile	24.622	146.211
4	5	Geoff Bodine	Hendrick Motorsports	Chevrolet	24.799	145.167
5	15	Brett Bodine	Bud Moore Engineering	Ford	24.815	145.074
6	75	Neil Bonnett	RahMoc Enterprises	Pontiac	24.983	144.098
7	55	Phil Parsons	Jackson Bros. Motorsports	Oldsmobile	24.996	144.023
8	71	Dave Marcis	Marcis Auto Racing	Chevrolet	25.041	143.764
9	3	Dale Earnhardt	Richard Childress Racing	Chevrolet	25.067	143.615
10	12	Bobby Allison	Stavola Brothers Racing	Buick	25.071	143.592
11	27	Rusty Wallace	Blue Max Racing	Pontiac	25.087	143.501
12	33	Morgan Shepherd	Mach 1 Racing	Chevrolet	25.089	143.489
13	25	Ken Schrader	Hendrick Motorsports	Chevrolet	25.138	143.209
14	28	Davey Allison	Ranier-Lundy Racing	Ford	25.164	143.062
15	31	Joe Ruttman	Bob Clark Motorsports	Oldsmobile	25.164	143.062
16	11	Terry Labonte	Junior Johnson & Associates	Chevrolet	25.198	142.868
17	9	Bill Elliott	Melling Racing	Ford	25.201	142.851
18	44	Sterling Marlin	Hagan Racing	Oldsmobile	25.227	142.704
19	43	Richard Petty	Petty Enterprises	Pontiac	25.237	142.648
20	26	Ricky Rudd	King Racing	Buick	25.258	142.529
Failed to lock in Round 1
21	83	Lake Speed	Speed Racing	Oldsmobile	25.015	143.914
22	17	Darrell Waltrip	Hendrick Motorsports	Chevrolet	25.037	143.787
23	30	Michael Waltrip	Bahari Racing	Pontiac	25.051	143.707
24	90	Benny Parsons	Donlavey Racing	Ford	25.152	143.130
25	68	Derrike Cope	Testa Racing	Ford	25.260	142.518
26	21	Kyle Petty	Wood Brothers Racing	Ford	25.344	142.045
27	88	Buddy Baker	Baker–Schiff Racing	Oldsmobile	25.345	142.040
28	8	Bobby Hillin Jr.	Stavola Brothers Racing	Buick	25.398	141.743
29	97	Rodney Combs	Winkle Motorsports	Buick	25.428	141.576
30	10	Ken Bouchard (R)	Whitcomb Racing	Ford	25.447	141.471
31	23	Eddie Bierschwale	B&B Racing	Oldsmobile	25.447	141.471
32	52	Jimmy Means	Jimmy Means Racing	Pontiac	25.478	141.298
33	98	Brad Noffsinger (R)	Curb Racing	Buick	25.552	140.887
34	2	Ernie Irvan (R)	U.S. Racing	Chevrolet	25.554	140.878
35	29	Dale Jarrett	Cale Yarborough Motorsports	Oldsmobile	25.610	140.620
36	78	Jay Sommers	Sommers Racing	Chevrolet	25.670	140.242
37	96	Dana Patten	Patten Racing	Buick	25.864	139.190
38	41	Joe Booher	Booher Racing	Chevrolet	25.895	139.023
39	70	J. D. McDuffie	McDuffie Racing	Pontiac	25.911	138.937
40	80	Jimmy Horton (R)	S&H Racing	Ford	25.932	138.825
Failed to qualify
41	67	Buddy Arrington	Arrington Racing	Ford	-*	-*
Official first round qualifying results
Official starting lineup

== Race results ==
Fin	St	#	Driver	Team	Make	Laps	Led	Status	Pts	Winnings
1	17	9	Bill Elliott	Melling Racing	Ford	500	203	running	185	$53,000
2	12	33	Morgan Shepherd	Mach 1 Racing	Chevrolet	500	110	running	175	$29,300
3	11	27	Rusty Wallace	Blue Max Racing	Pontiac	500	51	running	170	$26,350
4	21	83	Lake Speed	Speed Racing	Oldsmobile	499	0	running	160	$13,550
5	14	28	Davey Allison	Ranier-Lundy Racing	Ford	499	74	running	160	$20,150
6	1	7	Alan Kulwicki	AK Racing	Ford	499	7	running	155	$16,400
7	3	4	Rick Wilson	Morgan–McClure Motorsports	Oldsmobile	498	0	running	146	$8,225
8	4	5	Geoff Bodine	Hendrick Motorsports	Chevrolet	498	0	running	142	$9,325
9	2	6	Mark Martin	Roush Racing	Ford	497	20	running	143	$7,075
10	10	12	Bobby Allison	Stavola Brothers Racing	Buick	497	0	running	134	$13,300
11	18	44	Sterling Marlin	Hagan Racing	Oldsmobile	497	0	running	130	$7,525
12	16	11	Terry Labonte	Junior Johnson & Associates	Chevrolet	497	0	running	127	$10,225
13	27	88	Buddy Baker	Baker–Schiff Racing	Oldsmobile	496	0	running	124	$6,275
14	30	10	Ken Bouchard (R)	Whitcomb Racing	Ford	496	0	running	121	$5,075
15	19	43	Richard Petty	Petty Enterprises	Pontiac	495	0	running	118	$6,275
16	9	3	Dale Earnhardt	Richard Childress Racing	Chevrolet	495	0	running	115	$13,450
17	28	8	Bobby Hillin Jr.	Stavola Brothers Racing	Buick	495	0	running	112	$5,450
18	25	68	Derrike Cope	Testa Racing	Ford	494	0	running	109	$5,600
19	20	26	Ricky Rudd	King Racing	Buick	493	0	running	106	$5,200
20	35	29	Dale Jarrett	Cale Yarborough Motorsports	Oldsmobile	492	0	running	103	$3,700
21	13	25	Ken Schrader	Hendrick Motorsports	Chevrolet	490	0	running	100	$8,250
22	24	90	Benny Parsons	Donlavey Racing	Ford	490	0	running	97	$4,900
23	22	17	Darrell Waltrip	Hendrick Motorsports	Chevrolet	490	0	running	94	$9,150
24	33	98	Brad Noffsinger (R)	Curb Racing	Buick	477	0	running	91	$2,100
25	39	70	J. D. McDuffie	McDuffie Racing	Pontiac	476	1	running	93	$2,150
26	34	2	Ernie Irvan (R)	U.S. Racing	Chevrolet	426	1	valve	90	$2,000
27	32	52	Jimmy Means	Jimmy Means Racing	Pontiac	425	4	running	87	$3,950
28	37	96	Dana Patten	Patten Racing	Buick	413	0	engine	79	$1,900
29	29	97	Rodney Combs	Winkle Motorsports	Buick	406	0	engine	76	$1,850
30	15	31	Joe Ruttman	Bob Clark Motorsports	Oldsmobile	391	0	oil pump	73	$2,475
31	5	15	Brett Bodine	Bud Moore Engineering	Ford	391	15	engine	75	$10,350
32	8	71	Dave Marcis	Marcis Auto Racing	Chevrolet	362	0	crash	67	$5,100
33	26	21	Kyle Petty	Wood Brothers Racing	Ford	357	0	engine	64	$8,650
34	40	80	Jimmy Horton (R)	S&H Racing	Ford	314	0	wheel bearing	61	$1,600
35	6	75	Neil Bonnett	RahMoc Enterprises	Pontiac	297	0	engine	58	$8,550
36	23	30	Michael Waltrip	Bahari Racing	Pontiac	295	0	engine	55	$4,150
37	36	78	Jay Sommers	Sommers Racing	Chevrolet	280	0	overheating	52	$1,510
38	38	41	Joe Booher	Booher Racing	Chevrolet	272	0	crash	49	$1,495
39	7	55	Phil Parsons	Jackson Bros. Motorsports	Oldsmobile	209	14	valve	51	$4,020
40	31	23	Eddie Bierschwale	B&B Racing	Oldsmobile	15	0	valve	43	$1,400
Failed to qualify
41		67	Buddy Arrington	Arrington Racing	Ford					
Official race results

== Standings after the race ==
Drivers' Championship standings

	Pos	Driver	Points
	1	Dale Earnhardt	1,621
	2	Rusty Wallace	1,605 (-16)
2	3	Bill Elliott	1,571 (-50)
1	4	Sterling Marlin	1,539 (–82)
1	5	Terry Labonte	1,527 (–94)
	6	Bobby Allison	1,511 (–110)
	7	Ken Schrader	1,428 (–193)
1	8	Geoff Bodine	1,413 (–208)
1	9	Bobby Hillin Jr.	1,387 (–234)
	10	Darrell Waltrip	1,358 (–263)
Official driver's standings

- Note: Only the first 10 positions are included for the driver standings.

Previous race: 1988 Coca-Cola 600	NASCAR Winston Cup Series; 1988 season	Next race: 1988 Budweiser 400
