= 1990 Budweiser 500 =

11th race of the 1990 NASCAR Winston Cup Series

Race details
- Race 11 of 29 in the 1990 NASCAR Winston Cup Series
- The 1990 Budweiser 500 program cover, featuring Geoff Bodine.
- Date: June 3, 1990
- Official name: 22nd Annual Budweiser 500
- Location: Dover, Delaware, Dover Downs International Speedway
- Course: Permanent racing facility
- Course length: 1 miles (1.6 km)
- Distance: 500 laps, 500 mi (804.672 km)
- Scheduled distance: 500 laps, 500 mi (804.672 km)
- Average speed: 120.152 miles per hour (193.366 km/h)
- Attendance: 72,000

Pole position
| Driver | Dick Trickle | Cale Yarborough Motorsports |
- Time: 24.689

Most laps led
| Driver | Rusty Wallace | Blue Max Racing |
- Laps: 131

Winner
| No. 10 | Derrike Cope | Whitcomb Racing |

Television in the United States
- Network: ESPN
- Announcers: Bob Jenkins, Ned Jarrett, Benny Parsons

Radio in the United States
- Radio: Motor Racing Network

The 1990 Budweiser 500 was the 11th stock car race of the 1990 NASCAR Winston Cup Series season and the 22nd iteration of the event. The race was held on Sunday, June 3, 1990, before an audience of 77,000 in Dover, Delaware at Dover Downs International Speedway, a 1-mile (1.6 km) permanent oval-shaped racetrack. The race took the scheduled 500 laps to complete. In the late stages of the race, Whitcomb Racing driver Derrike Cope would make a late-race charge to the front, passing for the lead with 55 laps to go to take his second and to date, final career NASCAR Winston Cup Series victory and his second and final victory of the season. To fill out the top three, Hendrick Motorsports driver Ken Schrader and Cale Yarborough Motorsports driver Dick Trickle would finish second and third, respectively.

In the driver's championship standings, Bud Moore Engineering driver Morgan Shepherd would take the overall lead after a poor finish from then-points leader Dale Earnhardt.

== Background ==
The layout of Dover Downs International Speedway, the venue where the race was held.

Dover Downs International Speedway is an oval race track in Dover, Delaware, United States that has held at least two NASCAR races since it opened in 1969. In addition to NASCAR, the track also hosted USAC and the NTT IndyCar Series. The track features one layout, a 1-mile (1.6 km) concrete oval, with 24° banking in the turns and 9° banking on the straights. The speedway is owned and operated by Dover Motorsports.

The track, nicknamed "The Monster Mile", was built in 1969 by Melvin Joseph of Melvin L. Joseph Construction Company, Inc., with an asphalt surface, but was replaced with concrete in 1995. Six years later in 2001, the track's capacity moved to 135,000 seats, making the track have the largest capacity of sports venue in the mid-Atlantic. In 2002, the name changed to Dover International Speedway from Dover Downs International Speedway after Dover Downs Gaming and Entertainment split, making Dover Motorsports. From 2007 to 2009, the speedway worked on an improvement project called "The Monster Makeover", which expanded facilities at the track and beautified the track. After the 2014 season, the track's capacity was reduced to 95,500 seats.

=== Entry list ===
- (R) denotes rookie driver.

| # | Driver | Team | Make |
|---|---|---|---|
| 1 | Terry Labonte | Precision Products Racing | Oldsmobile |
| 2 | Rick Mast | U.S. Racing | Pontiac |
| 3 | Dale Earnhardt | Richard Childress Racing | Chevrolet |
| 4 | Ernie Irvan | Morgan–McClure Motorsports | Oldsmobile |
| 5 | Ricky Rudd | Hendrick Motorsports | Chevrolet |
| 6 | Mark Martin | Roush Racing | Ford |
| 7 | Alan Kulwicki | AK Racing | Ford |
| 8 | Bobby Hillin Jr. | Stavola Brothers Racing | Buick |
| 9 | Bill Elliott | Melling Racing | Ford |
| 10 | Derrike Cope | Whitcomb Racing | Chevrolet |
| 11 | Geoff Bodine | Junior Johnson & Associates | Ford |
| 12 | Hut Stricklin | Bobby Allison Motorsports | Buick |
| 15 | Morgan Shepherd | Bud Moore Engineering | Ford |
| 17 | Darrell Waltrip | Hendrick Motorsports | Chevrolet |
| 20 | Rob Moroso (R) | Moroso Racing | Oldsmobile |
| 21 | Dale Jarrett | Wood Brothers Racing | Ford |
| 25 | Ken Schrader | Hendrick Motorsports | Chevrolet |
| 26 | Brett Bodine | King Racing | Buick |
| 27 | Rusty Wallace | Blue Max Racing | Pontiac |
| 28 | Davey Allison | Robert Yates Racing | Ford |
| 30 | Michael Waltrip | Bahari Racing | Pontiac |
| 33 | Harry Gant | Leo Jackson Motorsports | Oldsmobile |
| 42 | Kyle Petty | SABCO Racing | Pontiac |
| 43 | Richard Petty | Petty Enterprises | Pontiac |
| 48 | Freddie Crawford | Hylton Motorsports | Chevrolet |
| 52 | Jimmy Means | Jimmy Means Racing | Pontiac |
| 57 | Jimmy Spencer | Osterlund Racing | Pontiac |
| 66 | Dick Trickle | Cale Yarborough Motorsports | Pontiac |
| 70 | J. D. McDuffie | McDuffie Racing | Pontiac |
| 71 | Dave Marcis | Marcis Auto Racing | Chevrolet |
| 74 | Mike Potter | Wawak Racing | Pontiac |
| 75 | Rick Wilson | RahMoc Enterprises | Pontiac |
| 80 | Jimmy Horton | S&H Racing | Ford |
| 85 | Bobby Gerhart | Bobby Gerhart Racing | Chevrolet |
| 94 | Sterling Marlin | Hagan Racing | Oldsmobile |
| 98 | Butch Miller | Travis Carter Enterprises | Chevrolet |

== Qualifying ==
Qualifying was split into two rounds. The first round was held on Friday, June 1, at 3:00 PM EST. Each driver would have one lap to set a time. During the first round, the top 20 drivers in the round would be guaranteed a starting spot in the race. If a driver was not able to guarantee a spot in the first round, they had the option to scrub their time from the first round and try and run a faster lap time in a second round qualifying run, held on Saturday, June 2, at 11:30 AM EST. As with the first round, each driver would have one lap to set a time. For this specific race, positions 21-40 would be decided on time, and depending on who needed it, a select amount of positions were given to cars who had not otherwise qualified but were high enough in owner's points; up to two provisionals were given.

Dick Trickle, driving for Cale Yarborough Motorsports, would win the pole, setting a time of 24.689 and an average speed of 145.814 miles per hour (234.665 km/h) in the first round.

No drivers would fail to qualify.

=== Full qualifying results ===
| Pos. | # | Driver | Team | Make | Time | Speed |
|---|---|---|---|---|---|---|
| 1 | 66 | Dick Trickle | Cale Yarborough Motorsports | Pontiac | 24.689 | 145.814 |
| 2 | 6 | Mark Martin | Roush Racing | Ford | 24.898 | 144.590 |
| 3 | 11 | Geoff Bodine | Junior Johnson & Associates | Ford | 24.936 | 144.370 |
| 4 | 3 | Dale Earnhardt | Richard Childress Racing | Chevrolet | 24.941 | 144.341 |
| 5 | 27 | Rusty Wallace | Blue Max Racing | Pontiac | 24.953 | 144.271 |
| 6 | 42 | Kyle Petty | SABCO Racing | Pontiac | 25.035 | 143.799 |
| 7 | 7 | Alan Kulwicki | AK Racing | Ford | 25.057 | 143.672 |
| 8 | 9 | Bill Elliott | Melling Racing | Ford | 25.111 | 143.363 |
| 9 | 26 | Brett Bodine | King Racing | Buick | 25.128 | 143.266 |
| 10 | 25 | Ken Schrader | Hendrick Motorsports | Chevrolet | 25.179 | 142.976 |
| 11 | 4 | Ernie Irvan | Morgan–McClure Motorsports | Oldsmobile | 25.227 | 142.704 |
| 12 | 71 | Dave Marcis | Marcis Auto Racing | Chevrolet | 25.237 | 142.648 |
| 13 | 33 | Harry Gant | Leo Jackson Motorsports | Oldsmobile | 25.244 | 142.608 |
| 14 | 15 | Morgan Shepherd | Bud Moore Engineering | Ford | 25.248 | 142.586 |
| 15 | 10 | Derrike Cope | Whitcomb Racing | Chevrolet | 25.250 | 142.574 |
| 16 | 94 | Sterling Marlin | Hagan Racing | Oldsmobile | 25.261 | 142.512 |
| 17 | 21 | Dale Jarrett | Wood Brothers Racing | Ford | 25.268 | 142.473 |
| 18 | 20 | Rob Moroso (R) | Moroso Racing | Oldsmobile | 25.304 | 142.270 |
| 19 | 1 | Terry Labonte | Precision Products Racing | Oldsmobile | 25.311 | 142.231 |
| 20 | 5 | Ricky Rudd | Hendrick Motorsports | Chevrolet | 25.325 | 142.152 |
Failed to lock in Round 1
| 21 | 30 | Michael Waltrip | Bahari Racing | Pontiac | 25.172 | 143.016 |
| 22 | 12 | Hut Stricklin | Bobby Allison Motorsports | Buick | 25.317 | 142.197 |
| 23 | 43 | Richard Petty | Petty Enterprises | Pontiac | 25.343 | 142.051 |
| 24 | 75 | Rick Wilson | RahMoc Enterprises | Pontiac | 25.357 | 141.973 |
| 25 | 17 | Darrell Waltrip | Hendrick Motorsports | Chevrolet | 25.365 | 141.928 |
| 26 | 2 | Rick Mast | U.S. Racing | Pontiac | 25.369 | 141.905 |
| 27 | 28 | Davey Allison | Robert Yates Racing | Ford | 25.401 | 141.727 |
| 28 | 57 | Jimmy Spencer | Osterlund Racing | Pontiac | 25.599 | 140.630 |
| 29 | 98 | Butch Miller | Travis Carter Enterprises | Chevrolet | 25.633 | 140.444 |
| 30 | 52 | Jimmy Means | Jimmy Means Racing | Pontiac | 25.793 | 139.573 |
| 31 | 8 | Bobby Hillin Jr. | Stavola Brothers Racing | Buick | 25.837 | 139.335 |
| 32 | 80 | Jimmy Horton | S&H Racing | Ford | 26.036 | 138.270 |
| 33 | 74 | Mike Potter | Wawak Racing | Pontiac | 26.408 | 136.322 |
| 34 | 70 | J. D. McDuffie | McDuffie Racing | Pontiac | 26.605 | 135.313 |
| 35 | 85 | Bobby Gerhart | Bobby Gerhart Racing | Chevrolet | 27.730 | 129.823 |
| 36 | 48 | Freddie Crawford | Hylton Motorsports | Chevrolet | - | - |
Official first round qualifying results
Official starting lineup

== Race results ==
| Fin | St | # | Driver | Team | Make | Laps | Led | Status | Pts | Winnings |
|---|---|---|---|---|---|---|---|---|---|---|
| 1 | 15 | 10 | Derrike Cope | Whitcomb Racing | Chevrolet | 500 | 93 | running | 180 | $55,050 |
| 2 | 10 | 25 | Ken Schrader | Hendrick Motorsports | Chevrolet | 500 | 3 | running | 175 | $34,575 |
| 3 | 1 | 66 | Dick Trickle | Cale Yarborough Motorsports | Pontiac | 500 | 63 | running | 170 | $29,125 |
| 4 | 2 | 6 | Mark Martin | Roush Racing | Ford | 500 | 36 | running | 165 | $23,575 |
| 5 | 16 | 94 | Sterling Marlin | Hagan Racing | Oldsmobile | 500 | 10 | running | 160 | $16,325 |
| 6 | 14 | 15 | Morgan Shepherd | Bud Moore Engineering | Ford | 500 | 0 | running | 150 | $12,275 |
| 7 | 11 | 4 | Ernie Irvan | Morgan–McClure Motorsports | Oldsmobile | 500 | 0 | running | 146 | $11,325 |
| 8 | 8 | 9 | Bill Elliott | Melling Racing | Ford | 500 | 69 | running | 147 | $16,025 |
| 9 | 6 | 42 | Kyle Petty | SABCO Racing | Pontiac | 500 | 67 | running | 143 | $15,575 |
| 10 | 5 | 27 | Rusty Wallace | Blue Max Racing | Pontiac | 500 | 131 | running | 144 | $19,825 |
| 11 | 20 | 5 | Ricky Rudd | Hendrick Motorsports | Chevrolet | 499 | 0 | running | 130 | $9,025 |
| 12 | 17 | 21 | Dale Jarrett | Wood Brothers Racing | Ford | 498 | 0 | running | 127 | $8,425 |
| 13 | 19 | 1 | Terry Labonte | Precision Products Racing | Oldsmobile | 498 | 0 | running | 124 | $8,075 |
| 14 | 29 | 98 | Butch Miller | Travis Carter Enterprises | Chevrolet | 493 | 0 | running | 121 | $6,682 |
| 15 | 3 | 11 | Geoff Bodine | Junior Johnson & Associates | Ford | 492 | 0 | running | 118 | $12,850 |
| 16 | 31 | 8 | Bobby Hillin Jr. | Stavola Brothers Racing | Buick | 491 | 0 | running | 115 | $7,100 |
| 17 | 27 | 28 | Davey Allison | Robert Yates Racing | Ford | 491 | 0 | running | 112 | $11,750 |
| 18 | 9 | 26 | Brett Bodine | King Racing | Buick | 490 | 0 | running | 109 | $6,800 |
| 19 | 25 | 17 | Darrell Waltrip | Hendrick Motorsports | Chevrolet | 489 | 0 | running | 106 | $12,650 |
| 20 | 32 | 80 | Jimmy Horton | S&H Racing | Ford | 485 | 0 | running | 103 | $4,375 |
| 21 | 23 | 43 | Richard Petty | Petty Enterprises | Pontiac | 478 | 0 | running | 100 | $4,550 |
| 22 | 30 | 52 | Jimmy Means | Jimmy Means Racing | Pontiac | 477 | 0 | running | 97 | $3,500 |
| 23 | 24 | 75 | Rick Wilson | RahMoc Enterprises | Pontiac | 441 | 0 | running | 94 | $6,400 |
| 24 | 7 | 7 | Alan Kulwicki | AK Racing | Ford | 413 | 0 | running | 91 | $6,250 |
| 25 | 34 | 70 | J. D. McDuffie | McDuffie Racing | Pontiac | 411 | 0 | valve | 88 | $3,450 |
| 26 | 21 | 30 | Michael Waltrip | Bahari Racing | Pontiac | 369 | 0 | running | 85 | $7,550 |
| 27 | 22 | 12 | Hut Stricklin | Bobby Allison Motorsports | Buick | 325 | 0 | camshaft | 82 | $3,950 |
| 28 | 26 | 2 | Rick Mast | U.S. Racing | Pontiac | 237 | 0 | clutch | 79 | $5,875 |
| 29 | 18 | 20 | Rob Moroso (R) | Moroso Racing | Oldsmobile | 167 | 0 | engine | 76 | $4,550 |
| 30 | 33 | 74 | Mike Potter | Wawak Racing | Pontiac | 161 | 0 | oil leak | 73 | $3,100 |
| 31 | 4 | 3 | Dale Earnhardt | Richard Childress Racing | Chevrolet | 159 | 0 | engine | 70 | $12,600 |
| 32 | 28 | 57 | Jimmy Spencer | Osterlund Racing | Pontiac | 151 | 0 | engine | 67 | $6,625 |
| 33 | 35 | 85 | Bobby Gerhart | Bobby Gerhart Racing | Chevrolet | 151 | 0 | fatigue | 64 | $2,950 |
| 34 | 13 | 33 | Harry Gant | Leo Jackson Motorsports | Oldsmobile | 139 | 28 | camshaft | 66 | $9,900 |
| 35 | 12 | 71 | Dave Marcis | Marcis Auto Racing | Chevrolet | 37 | 0 | engine | 58 | $5,400 |
| 36 | 36 | 48 | Freddie Crawford | Hylton Motorsports | Chevrolet | 6 | 0 | cylinder | 0 | $2,775 |
Official race results

== Standings after the race ==
Drivers' Championship standings

| | Pos | Driver | Points |
|---|---|---|---|
| 1 | 1 | Morgan Shepherd | 1,662 |
| 1 | 2 | Mark Martin | 1,630 (-32) |
| 2 | 3 | Dale Earnhardt | 1,603 (-59) |
| 1 | 4 | Rusty Wallace | 1,503 (–159) |
| 1 | 5 | Geoff Bodine | 1,484 (–178) |
| 1 | 6 | Kyle Petty | 1,479 (–183) |
| 1 | 7 | Darrell Waltrip | 1,453 (–209) |
| | 8 | Bill Elliott | 1,446 (–216) |
| | 9 | Ken Schrader | 1,446 (–216) |
| 2 | 10 | Ernie Irvan | 1,353 (–309) |
Official driver's standings

- Note: Only the first 10 positions are included for the driver standings.

| Previous race: 1990 Coca-Cola 600 | NASCAR Winston Cup Series; 1990 season | Next race: 1990 Banquet Frozen Foods 300 |
