= NASCAR Cup Series at Dover Motor Speedway =

NASCAR Cup Series spring race at Dover Motor Speedway

NASCAR Cup Series
- Venue: Dover Motor Speedway
- Location: Dover, Delaware, United States
- First race: 1969

Circuit information
- Surface: Concrete
- Length: 1 mi (1.6 km)
- Turns: 4

Stock car races in the NASCAR Cup Series are held annually at Dover Motor Speedway in Dover, Delaware since 1969.

From 1971 through 2020, a second Cup race was held at Dover in the fall.

== Current race ==
Ecosave 400
- First race: 1969
- Distance: 400 miles (643.7 km)
- Laps: 400
- Previous names: Mason-Dixon 300 (1969–1970); Mason-Dixon 500 (1971–1983); Budweiser 500 (1984–1994); Miller Genuine Draft 500 (1995); Miller 500 (1996–1997); MBNA Platinum 400 (1998–2002); MBNA Armed Forces Family 400 (2003); MBNA America 400 "A Salute To Heroes" (2004); MBNA RacePoints 400 (2005); Neighborhood Excellence 400 (2006); Autism Speaks 400 presented by Visa (2007); Best Buy 400 benefiting Student Clubs for Autism Speaks (2008); Autism Speaks 400 presented by Heluva Good! (2009); Autism Speaks 400 presented by Hershey's Milk & Milkshakes (2010); FedEx 400 benefiting Autism Speaks (2011–2015); AAA 400 Drive for Autism (2016–2018); Gander RV 400 (2019); Drydene 311 (2020); Drydene 400 (2021); DuraMAX Drydene 400 (2022); Würth 400 (2023–2024); Autotrader EchoPark Automotive 400 (2025)

The Ecosave 400 is the current name of the race, Denny Hamlin is the defending winner of the race, having won it in 2025.

=== History ===
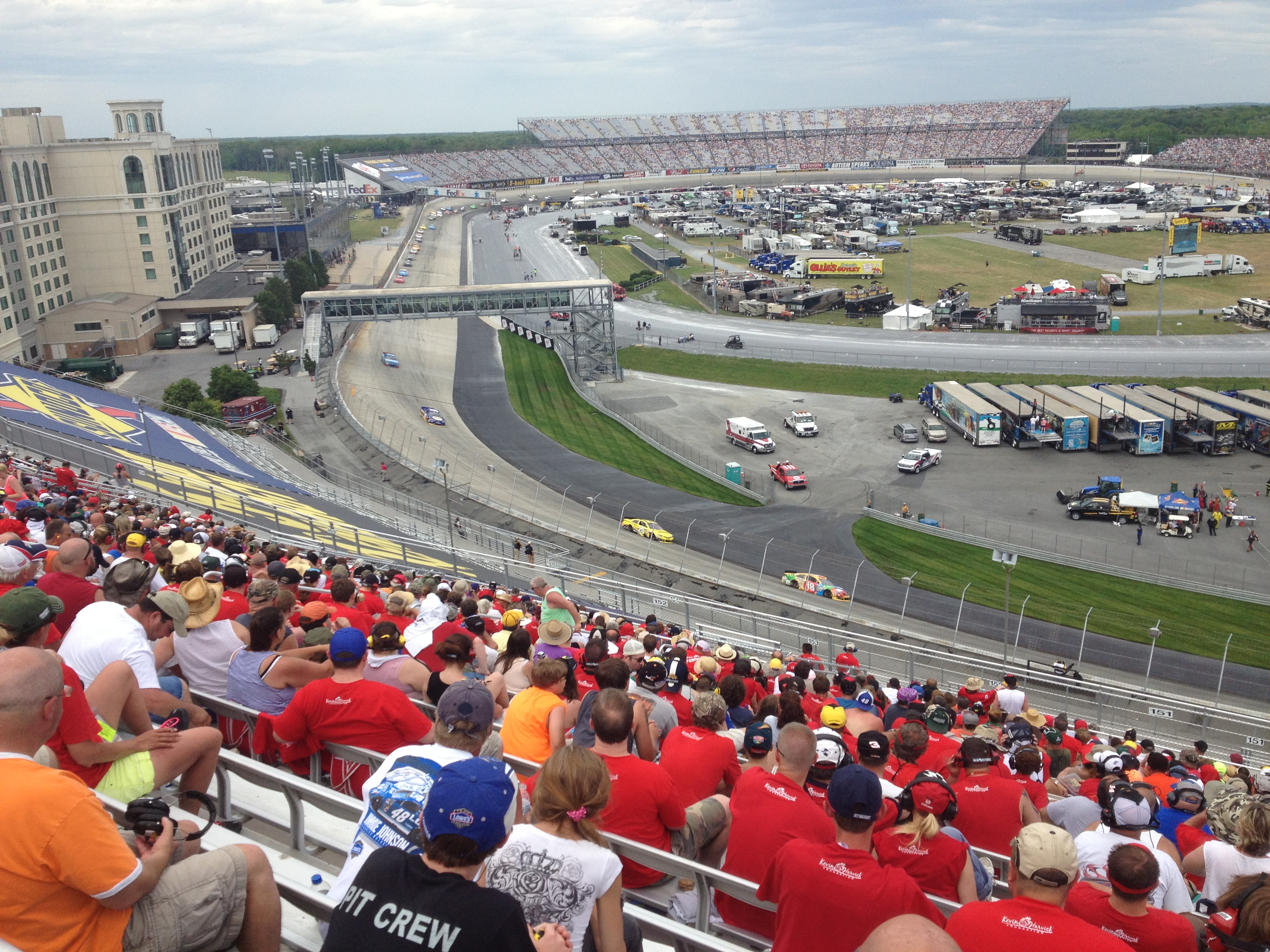
The 2013 FedEx 400, won by Tony Stewart after a late-race penalty took Jimmie Johnson out of contention.

The 2020 race was postponed to August due to the COVID-19 pandemic and became a doubleheader with the second race. Both events were named the Drydene 311 as their race lengths were shortened. For 2021, the race length was restored to 400 miles.

Alex Bowman won the race in 2021 as part of a historic 1-2-3-4 finish for Hendrick Motorsports.

In September 2021, RelaDyne bought the Drydene brand which was the title sponsor of the race. The company added another one of their brands, DuraMAX, to the title sponsor of the race. RelaDyne was also included in the name of the race as a presenting sponsor. As a result, in 2022, the name of the race became the DuraMAX Drydene 400 presented by RelaDyne. In 2023, Würth, which has been a sponsor on Team Penske's NASCAR Cup and Xfinity Series cars for a few races each year since 2012, became the title sponsor of the "Monster Mile" race.

=== Notable moments ===
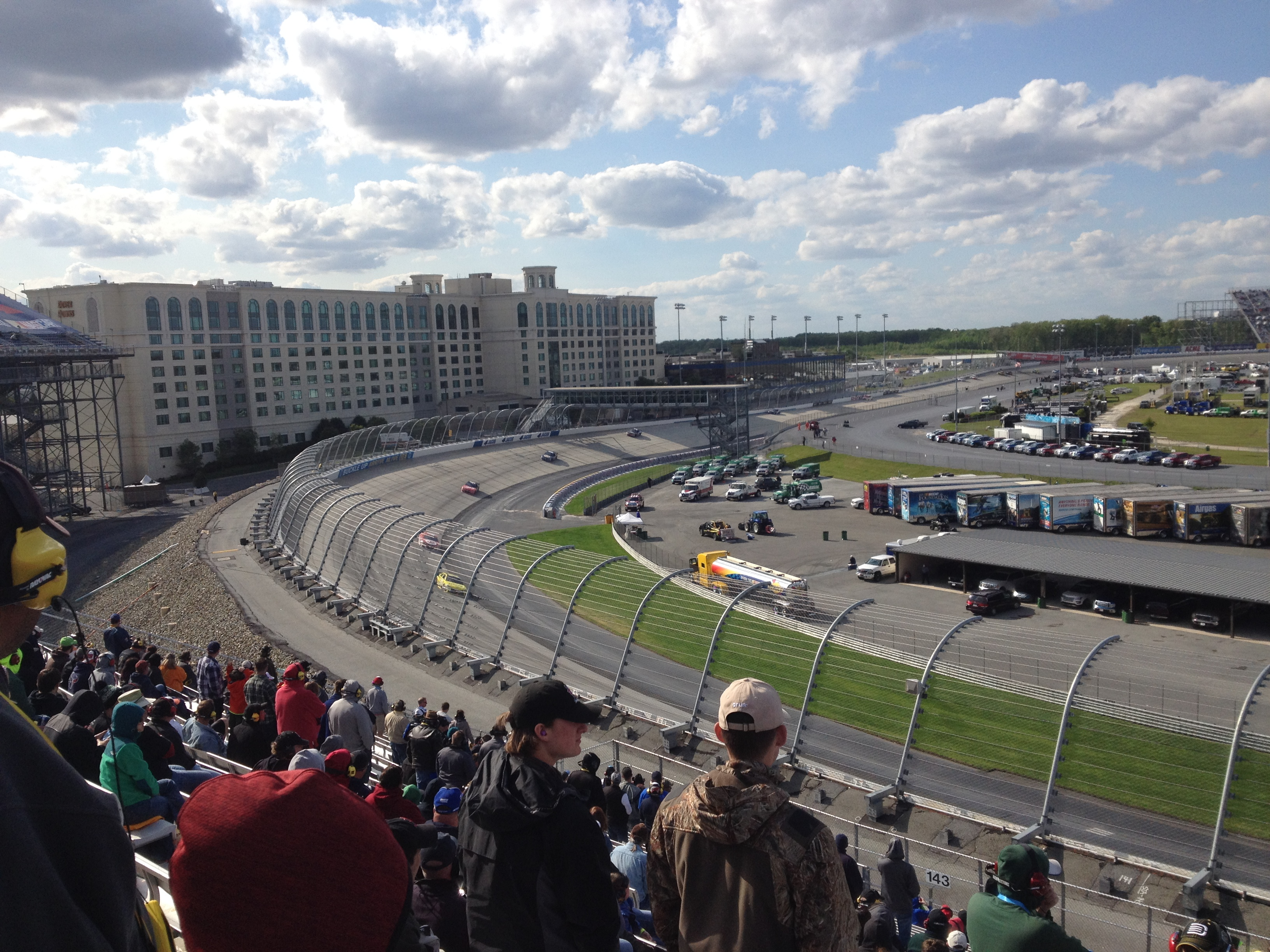
Eventual race winner Matt Kenseth leads in the closing laps of the 2016 AAA 400 Drive for Autism

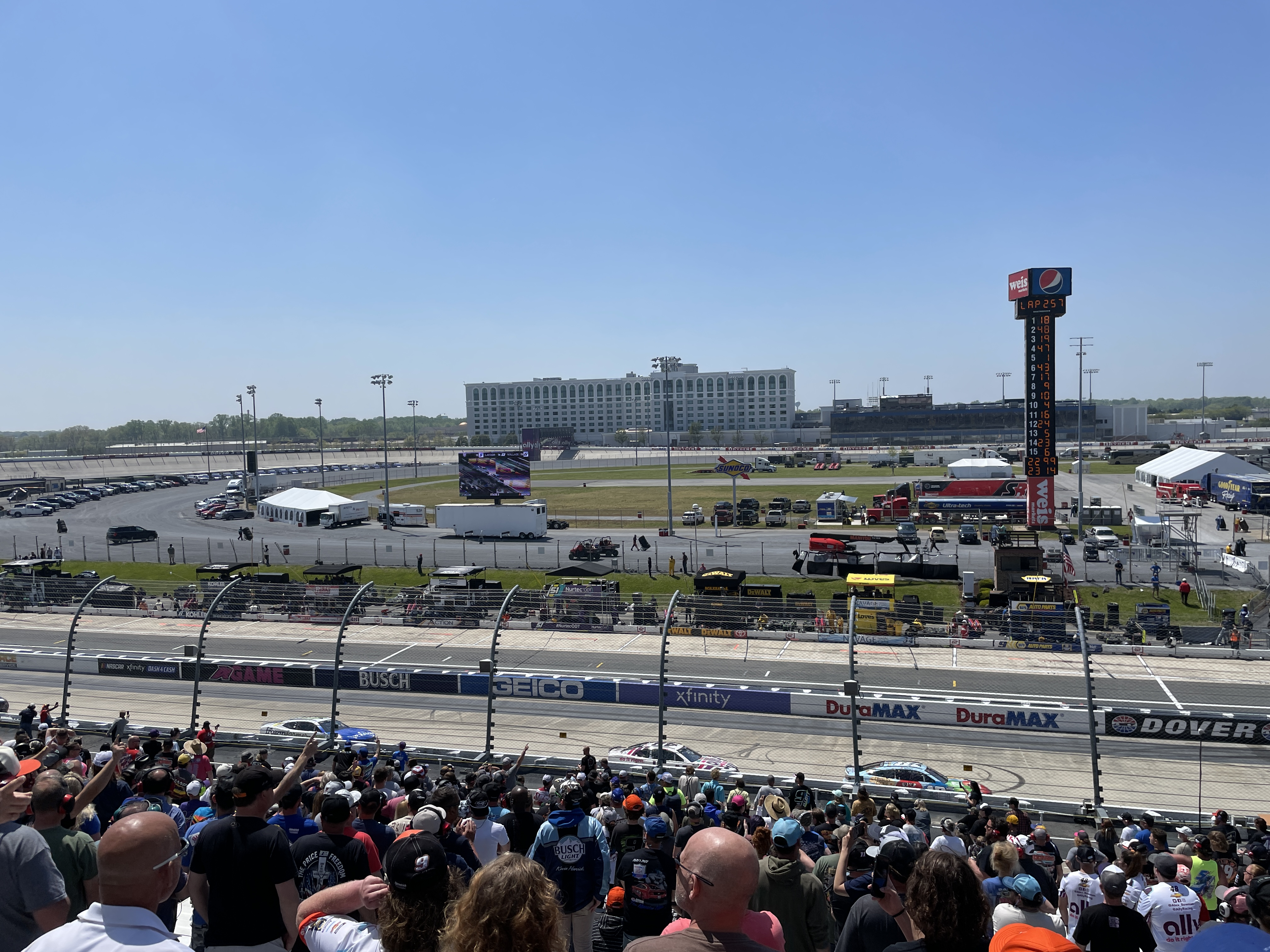
2022 DuraMAX Drydene 400

- 2014: Coming off turn two, A. J. Allmendinger came across Ricky Stenhouse Jr. and got loose. He collected Greg Biffle and both got loose. Biffle went into the wall tail-first, hit Stenhouse, and sent him into the outside wall and headfirst into the inside one on the backstretch. Landon Cassill and Ryan Truex also spun out in Turn 1. This brought out the third caution of the race. The race was then red-flagged, while Justin Allgaier also took damage when he was clipped in the side by Biffle. Kevin Harvick took the lead from Johnson on lap 142 while on lap 157, Jamie McMurray hit a piece on concrete in Turn 2, hit the wall in Turn 3, and brought out the fourth caution. This happened in a similar fashion to Jeff Gordon at Martinsville Speedway in 2004. NASCAR was forced to red flag the race for a second time to fix a hole in the track, while the concrete also damaged the glass covering the crossover bridge that crosses over the top of Turn 2. The race was suspended for 22 minutes, with Harvick holding the lead at the restart. However, just after the restart, Harvick had a tire go down and Matt Kenseth took the lead, Johnson retook the lead on lap 179, and upon completing lap 215, he became the all-time leader in laps led at Dover. Bowman hit the wall for a third time in turn 1 and brought out the fifth caution on lap 218. J. J. Yeley brought out the sixth caution on lap 240 after blowing his engine, while debris brought out the seventh caution with forty laps to go. Casey Mears' right-rear tire came apart and the inner-liner rubber that came off the tire brought out the eighth caution with eight laps to go. Johnson held off a four-lap charge by Brad Keselowski to take his second win of the season – successively, for the 13th time in his career – and 68th of his career. "It is incredible," Johnson said. "This race car was awesome. I just have so much to be thankful for. Chad (crew chief Knaus) told me I'd love the car, and sure enough, from the time we unloaded the car, he was right." Keselowski described his day as "up and down" and that his car did not progress as much as he had liked until the halfway mark of the race.
- 2015: For the first few laps, Truex Jr. kept Hamlin from getting a big lead, but as the field caught the tail end of the field, Hamlin jumped to a bigger lead. Eventually, Truex Jr. took back the lead on lap 145. The second round of pit stops began on lap 150 when Clint Bowyer hit pit road. Truex Jr. surrendered the lead to pit on lap 158 and gave it to Hamlin. He pitted on lap 160 and handed the lead to teammate Carl Edwards. He pitted on lap 162 and handed the lead to Dale Earnhardt Jr. The second caution flew on lap 163 when Ricky Stenhouse Jr. had a tire blow out and slammed the wall in turn 2. David Gilliland was tagged for speeding on pit road during the green flag stops and was forced to serve a drive-through penalty. Edwards was tagged for taking equipment out of the pit box after the wrench used to adjust the track bar got stuck in the hole and restarted the race from the tail end of the field. The race restarted on lap 169 with Truex Jr. in the lead. The third caution of the race flew on lap 176 for a 3-car wreck on the front stretch. This began when Trevor Bayne while exiting turn 4, was moving up the track and got turned by Michael Annett. He overcorrected, turned down, and hit the inside wall. Annett continued to ride the wall before getting rear-ended by Allgaier. Annett continued on, but Allgaier did not. While Truex opted not to pit, most of the cars on the lead lap behind him did. The race restarted with two laps to go at a scheduled green-white-checkered finish, Johnson shot ahead of teammate Kasey Kahne and held off Harvick to score his tenth career win at Dover. He became the fifth driver to have 10 or more wins at a single track.
- 2016: The race at Dover moved up two weeks before the All-Star Race at Charlotte, A major multi-car wreck occurred after their restart just past the start/finish line brought out the 11th caution of the race. Johnson's car stalled out, fell backward, and caused an 18-car wreck. Johnson, Truex, Harvick, McMurray, Newman, A. J. Allmendinger, Ricky Stenhouse Jr., Kyle Busch, Joey Logano, Aric Almirola, Hamlin, Biffle, Casey Mears, Dale Earnhardt Jr., Clint Bowyer, Trevor Bayne, Paul Menard, and Michael McDowell were all collected in the wreck. Johnson said afterward that as soon as he "went from second and tried to go into third, I kind of got up into the neutral gate of the transmission and it didn't even want to go to third," Johnson said. "It stopped before it ever went to third. And then I tried fourth and third and eventually, I got hit from behind...I thought maybe I missed a shift, but it wouldn't go into gear. Martin was good and patient with me. He gave me a couple of opportunities to try to find gear but it just locked out and wouldn't go into gear for some reason." The subsequent cleanup forced the red flag to fly. The red flag was lifted after 11 minutes and 22 seconds, The race restarted with 35 laps to go. Despite a hard-fought battle towards the finish with Larson and Chase Elliott, Kenseth – who assumed the lead after the multi-car wreck with 46 laps to go – drove on to score the victory.
- 2021: For the first time since 1970, the track would only host one race instead of two. Alex Bowman bested his teammate Kyle Larson on pit road to win Dover's lone race of 2021. Bowman's victory capped off Hendrick Motorsports finishing 1-2-3-4. It is just the fourth time this was accomplished, and first since Roush-Fenway Racing did it at Homestead in 2005. While Bowman won and Larson was second, Chase Elliott finished 3rd, and William Byron finished 4th.
- 2023: The race was postponed from Sunday to Monday due to rain. Ross Chastain made contact with Brennan Poole, who spun and got into Kyle Larson. Martin Truex Jr. held off Chastain on a late-race restart to score his fourth win at Dover and end a 54-race winless streak. Truex also completed a family sweep of the weekend as his brother Ryan Truex won the Xfinity race the Saturday before.

=== Past winners ===
Year	Date	No.	Driver	Team	Manufacturer	Race Distance		Race Time	Average Speed (mph)	Report	Ref
Year	Date	No.	Driver	Team	Manufacturer	Laps	Miles (km)	Race Time	Average Speed (mph)	Report	Ref
1969	July 6	43	Richard Petty	Petty Enterprises	Ford	300	300 (482.803)	2:35:28	115.772	Report	
1970	Sept 20	43	Richard Petty	Petty Enterprises	Plymouth	300	300 (482.803)	2:40:34	112.103	Report	
1971	June 6	12	Bobby Allison	Holman-Moody	Mercury	500	500 (804.672)	4:30:40	123.119	Report	
1972	June 4	12	Bobby Allison	Richard Howard	Chevrolet	500	500 (804.672)	4:12:49	118.019	Report	
1973	June 3	21	David Pearson	Wood Brothers Racing	Mercury	500	500 (804.672)	4:10:32	119.745	Report	
1974	May 19	11	Cale Yarborough	Richard Howard	Chevrolet	450*	450 (724.204)	3:54:40	115.057	Report	
1975	May 18	21	David Pearson	Wood Brothers Racing	Mercury	500	500 (804.672)	4:57:32	100.82	Report	
1976	May 16	72	Benny Parsons	L. G. DeWitt	Chevrolet	500	500 (804.672)	4:19:53	115.436	Report	
1977	May 15	11	Cale Yarborough	Junior Johnson & Associates	Chevrolet	500	500 (804.672)	4:03:26	123.327	Report	
1978	May 21	21	David Pearson	Wood Brothers Racing	Mercury	500	500 (804.672)	4:21:38	114.664	Report	
1979	May 20	21	Neil Bonnett	Wood Brothers Racing	Mercury	500	500 (804.672)	4:29:37	111.269	Report	
1980	May 18	15	Bobby Allison	Bud Moore Engineering	Ford	500	500 (804.672)	4:23:28	113.866	Report	
1981	May 17	90	Jody Ridley	Junie Donlavey	Ford	500	500 (804.672)	4:17:18	116.595	Report	
1982	May 16	88	Bobby Allison	DiGard Motorsports	Chevrolet	500	500 (804.672)	4:09:43	120.136	Report	
1983	May 15	22	Bobby Allison	DiGard Motorsports	Buick	500	500 (804.672)	4:21:13	114.847	Report	
1984	May 20	43	Richard Petty	Curb Racing	Pontiac	500	500 (804.672)	4:12:42	118.717	Report	
1985	May 19	9	Bill Elliott	Melling Racing	Ford	500	500 (804.672)	4:03:43	123.094	Report	
1986	May 18	5	Geoff Bodine	Hendrick Motorsports	Chevrolet	500	500 (804.672)	4:20:51	115.009	Report	
1987	May 31	28	Davey Allison	Ranier-Lundy	Ford	500	500 (804.672)	4:25:35	112.958	Report	
1988	June 5	9	Bill Elliott	Melling Racing	Ford	500	500 (804.672)	4:12:41	118.726	Report	
1989	June 4	3	Dale Earnhardt	Richard Childress Racing	Chevrolet	500	500 (804.672)	4:06:34	121.67	Report	
1990	June 3	10	Derrike Cope	Whitcomb Racing	Chevrolet	500	500 (804.672)	4:02:01	123.96	Report	
1991	June 2	25	Ken Schrader	Hendrick Motorsports	Chevrolet	500	500 (804.672)	4:09:41	120.152	Report	
1992	May 31	33	Harry Gant	Leo Jackson Racing	Oldsmobile	500	500 (804.672)	4:34:05	109.456	Report	
1993	June 6	3	Dale Earnhardt	Richard Childress Racing	Chevrolet	500	500 (804.672)	4:44:06	105.6	Report	
1994	June 5	2	Rusty Wallace	Penske Racing	Ford	500	500 (804.672)	4:52:36	102.529	Report	
1995	June 4	42	Kyle Petty	SABCO Racing	Pontiac	500	500 (804.672)	4:10:15	119.88	Report	
1996	June 2	24	Jeff Gordon	Hendrick Motorsports	Chevrolet	500	500 (804.672)	4:04:25	122.741	Report	
1997	June 1	10	Ricky Rudd	Rudd Performance Motorsports	Ford	500	500 (804.672)	4:21:42	114.635	Report	
1998	May 31	88	Dale Jarrett	Robert Yates Racing	Ford	400	400 (643.737)	3:20:46	119.522	Report	
1999	June 6	18	Bobby Labonte	Joe Gibbs Racing	Pontiac	400	400 (643.737)	3:19:00	120.603	Report	
2000	June 4	20	Tony Stewart	Joe Gibbs Racing	Pontiac	400	400 (643.737)	3:39:09	109.514	Report	
2001	June 3	24	Jeff Gordon	Hendrick Motorsports	Chevrolet	400	400 (643.737)	3:19:24	120.361	Report	
2002	June 2	48	Jimmie Johnson	Hendrick Motorsports	Chevrolet	400	400 (643.737)	3:24:10	117.551	Report	
2003	June 1	12	Ryan Newman	Penske Racing	Dodge	400	400 (643.737)	3:44:31	106.896	Report	
2004	June 6	6	Mark Martin	Roush Racing	Ford	400	400 (643.737)	4:07:19	97.042	Report	
2005	June 5	16	Greg Biffle	Roush Racing	Ford	400	400 (643.737)	3:15:43	122.626	Report	
2006	June 4	17	Matt Kenseth	Roush Racing	Ford	400	400 (643.737)	3:38:27	109.865	Report	
2007	June 4*	1	Martin Truex Jr.	Dale Earnhardt, Inc.	Chevrolet	400	400 (643.737)	3:21:45	118.95	Report	
2008	June 1	18	Kyle Busch	Joe Gibbs Racing	Toyota	400	400 (643.737)	3:18:04	121.171	Report	
2009	May 31	48	Jimmie Johnson	Hendrick Motorsports	Chevrolet	400	400 (643.737)	3:28:16	115.237	Report	
2010	May 16	18	Kyle Busch	Joe Gibbs Racing	Toyota	400	400 (643.737)	3:06:21	128.79	Report	
2011*	May 15	17	Matt Kenseth	Roush Fenway Racing	Ford	400	400 (643.737)	3:11:07	125.578	Report	
2012	June 3	48	Jimmie Johnson	Hendrick Motorsports	Chevrolet	400	400 (643.737)	3:15:23	122.835	Report	
2013	June 2	14	Tony Stewart	Stewart–Haas Racing	Chevrolet	400	400 (643.737)	3:14:51	123.172	Report	
2014	June 1	48	Jimmie Johnson	Hendrick Motorsports	Chevrolet	400	400 (643.737)	3:23:52	117.724	Report	
2015	May 31	48	Jimmie Johnson	Hendrick Motorsports	Chevrolet	405*	405 (651.784)	3:23:16	119.547	Report	
2016	May 15	20	Matt Kenseth	Joe Gibbs Racing	Toyota	400	400 (643.737)	3:39:29	109.348	Report	
2017	June 4	48	Jimmie Johnson	Hendrick Motorsports	Chevrolet	406*	406 (653.394)	3:52:06	104.955	Report	
2018	May 6	4	Kevin Harvick	Stewart–Haas Racing	Ford	400	400 (643.737)	3:28:37	115.044	Report	
2019	May 6*	19	Martin Truex Jr.	Joe Gibbs Racing	Toyota	400	400 (643.737)	3:08:37	127.242	Report	
2020	August 22*	11	Denny Hamlin	Joe Gibbs Racing	Toyota	311	311 (500.506)	2:30:03	124.359	Report	
2021	May 16	48	Alex Bowman	Hendrick Motorsports	Chevrolet	400	400 (643.737)	3:19:55	120.05	Report	
2022	May 1–2*	9	Chase Elliott	Hendrick Motorsports	Chevrolet	400	400 (643.737)	3:49:39	104.507	Report	
2023	May 1*	19	Martin Truex Jr.	Joe Gibbs Racing	Toyota	400	400 (643.737)	3:27:47	115.505	Report	
2024	April 28	11	Denny Hamlin	Joe Gibbs Racing	Toyota	400	400 (643.737)	3:20:57	119.433	Report	
2025	July 20	11	Denny Hamlin	Joe Gibbs Racing	Toyota	407*	407 (655.002)	3:40:18	110.849	Report	
2026	Not held										
2027	May 16									Report	

=== Multiple winners (drivers) ===
# Wins	Driver	Years won
6	Jimmie Johnson	2002, 2009, 2012, 2014–2015, 2017
5	Bobby Allison	1971–1972, 1980, 1982–1983
3	David Pearson	1973, 1975, 1978
3	Richard Petty	1969–1970, 1984
3	Matt Kenseth	2006, 2011, 2016
3	Martin Truex Jr.	2007, 2019, 2023
3	Denny Hamlin	2020, 2024, 2025
2	Cale Yarborough	1974, 1977
2	Bill Elliott	1985, 1988
2	Dale Earnhardt	1989, 1993
2	Jeff Gordon	1996, 2001
2	Kyle Busch	2008, 2010
2	Tony Stewart	2000, 2013

=== Multiple winners (teams) ===
# Wins	Team	Years won
12	Hendrick Motorsports	1986, 1991, 1996, 2001–2002, 2009, 2012, 2014–2015, 2017, 2021–2022
10	Joe Gibbs Racing	1999–2000, 2008, 2010, 2016, 2019–2020, 2023–2025
4	Wood Brothers Racing	1973, 1975, 1978–1979
4	RFK Racing	2004–2006, 2011
2	Petty Enterprises	1969–1970
2	Richard Howard	1972, 1974
2	DiGard Motorsports	1982–1983
2	Melling Racing	1985, 1988
2	Richard Childress Racing	1989, 1993
2	Penske Racing	1994, 2003
2	Stewart–Haas Racing	2013, 2018

=== Manufacturer wins ===
# Wins	Manufacturer	Years won
22	Chevrolet	1972, 1974, 1976–1977, 1982, 1986, 1989–1991, 1993, 1996, 2001–2002, 2007, 2009, 2012–2015, 2017, 2021–2022
14	Ford	1969, 1980–1981, 1985, 1987–1988, 1994, 1997–1998, 2004–2006, 2011, 2018
8	Toyota	2008, 2010, 2016, 2019–2020, 2023–2025
5	Mercury	1971, 1973, 1975, 1978–1979
4	Pontiac	1984, 1995, 1999–2000
1	Plymouth	1970
1	Buick	1983
1	Oldsmobile	1992
1	Dodge	2003

== Former second race ==
Drydene 311
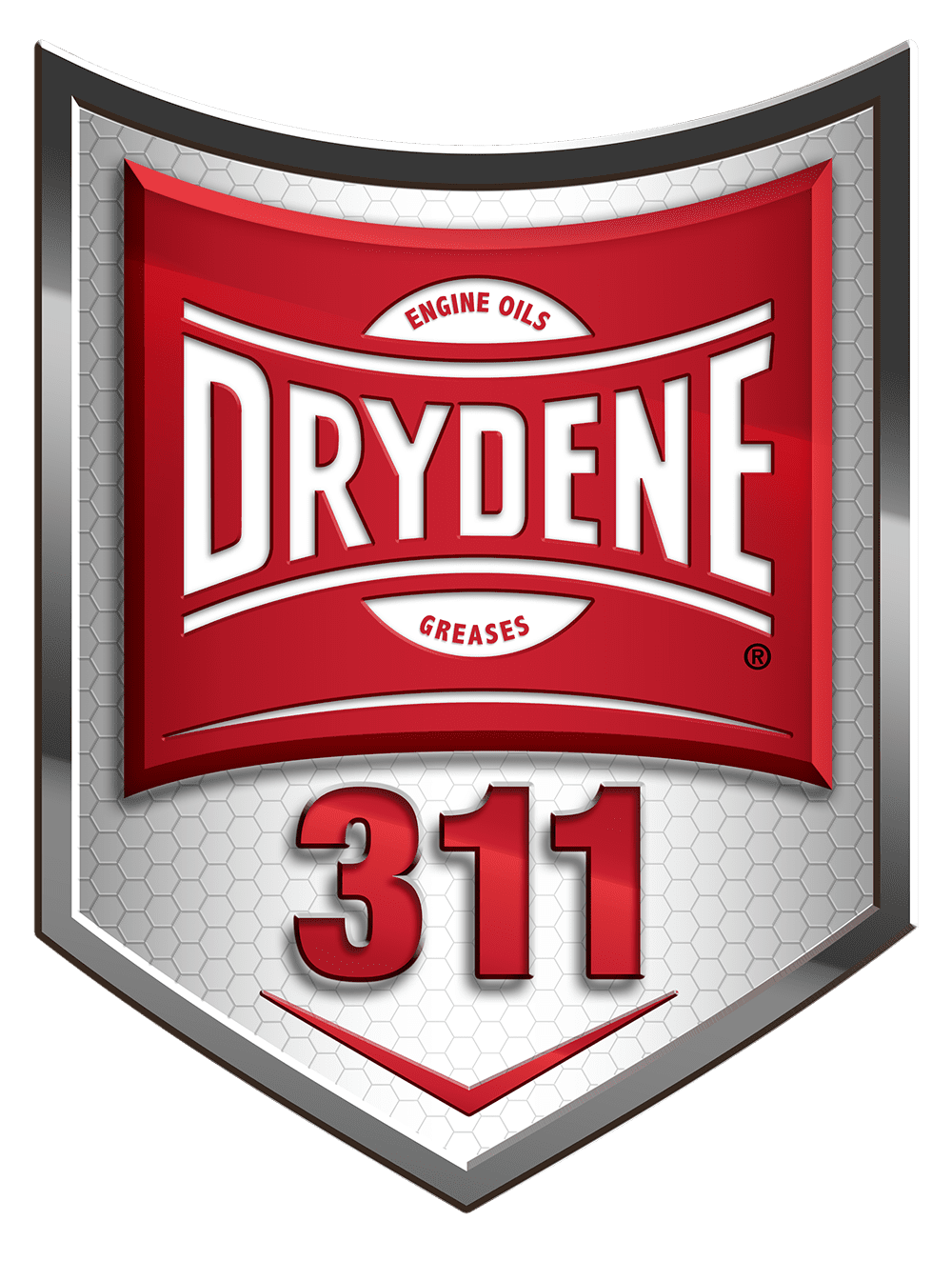
- First race: 1971
- Last race: 2020
- Distance: 311 miles (500.506 km)
- Laps: 311
- Previous names: Delaware 500 (1971–1978, 1984–1988); CRC Chemicals 500 (1979–1982); Budweiser 500 (1983); Peak Performance 500 (1989); Peak AntiFreeze 500 (1990–1992); SplitFire Spark Plug 500 (1993–1994); MBNA 500 (1995–1996); MBNA 400 (1997); MBNA Gold 400 (1998–1999); MBNA.com 400 (2000); MBNA Cal Ripken Jr. 400 (2001); MBNA All-American Heroes 400 (2002); MBNA America 400 (2003–2004); MBNA NASCAR RacePoints 400 (2005); Dover 400 (2006); Dodge Dealers 400 (2007); Camping World RV 400 (2008); AAA 400 (2009–2015); Citizen Soldier 400 (2016); Apache Warrior 400 (2017); Gander Outdoors 400 (2018); Drydene 400 (2019); Drydene 311 (2020)

The Drydene 311 was the name of the fall race, Kevin Harvick is the final winner, having won it in 2020.

=== History ===
The second race was part of the NASCAR playoffs from their start in 2004 until 2020, when the race was moved to the penultimate weekend of the regular season. The race was left off of the schedule in 2021 as Dover Motorsports, the track's owner, elected to move one of its two dates to Nashville Superspeedway as part of a schedule realignment.

=== Notable races ===
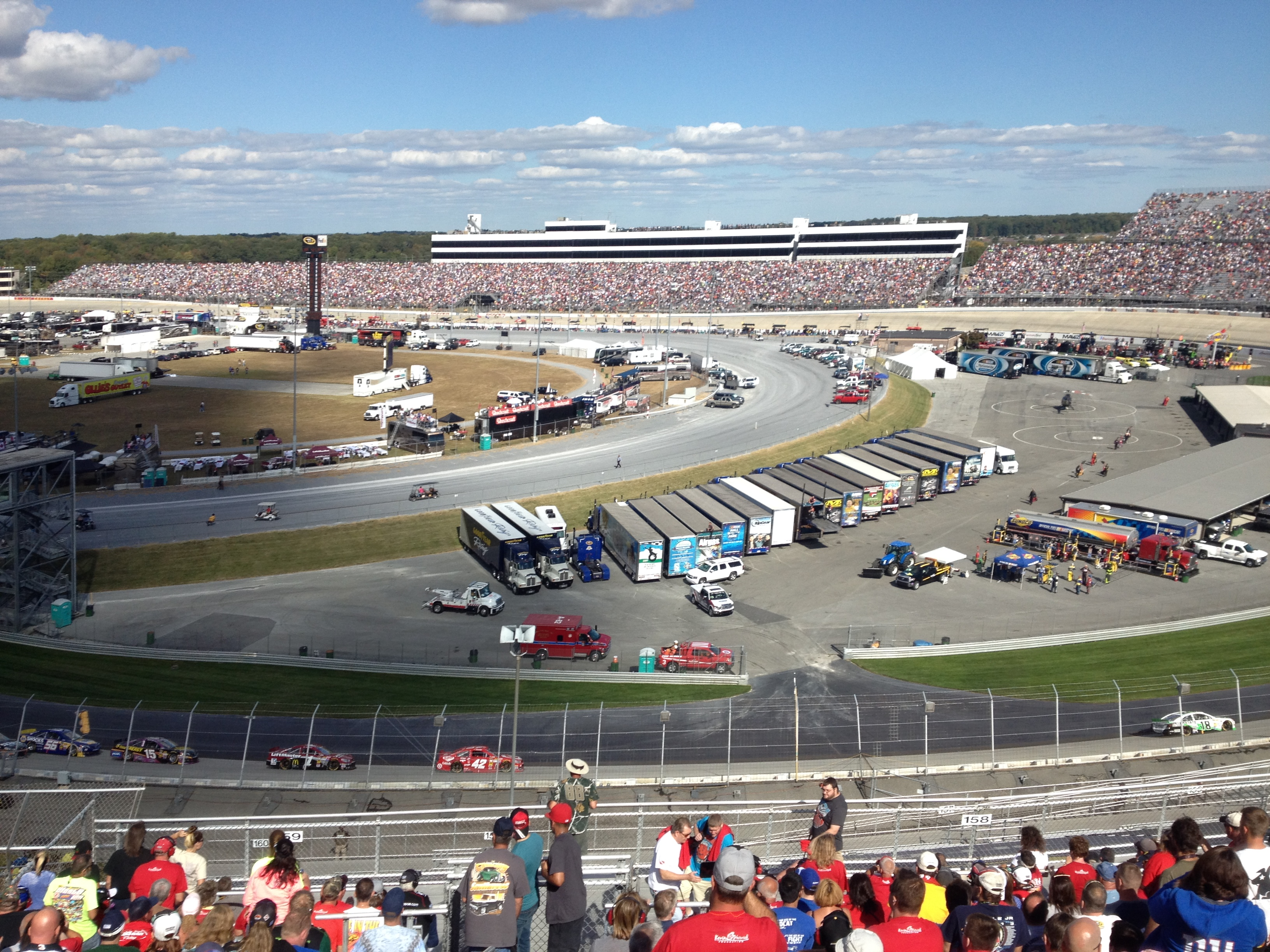
2013 AAA 400, won by Jimmie Johnson

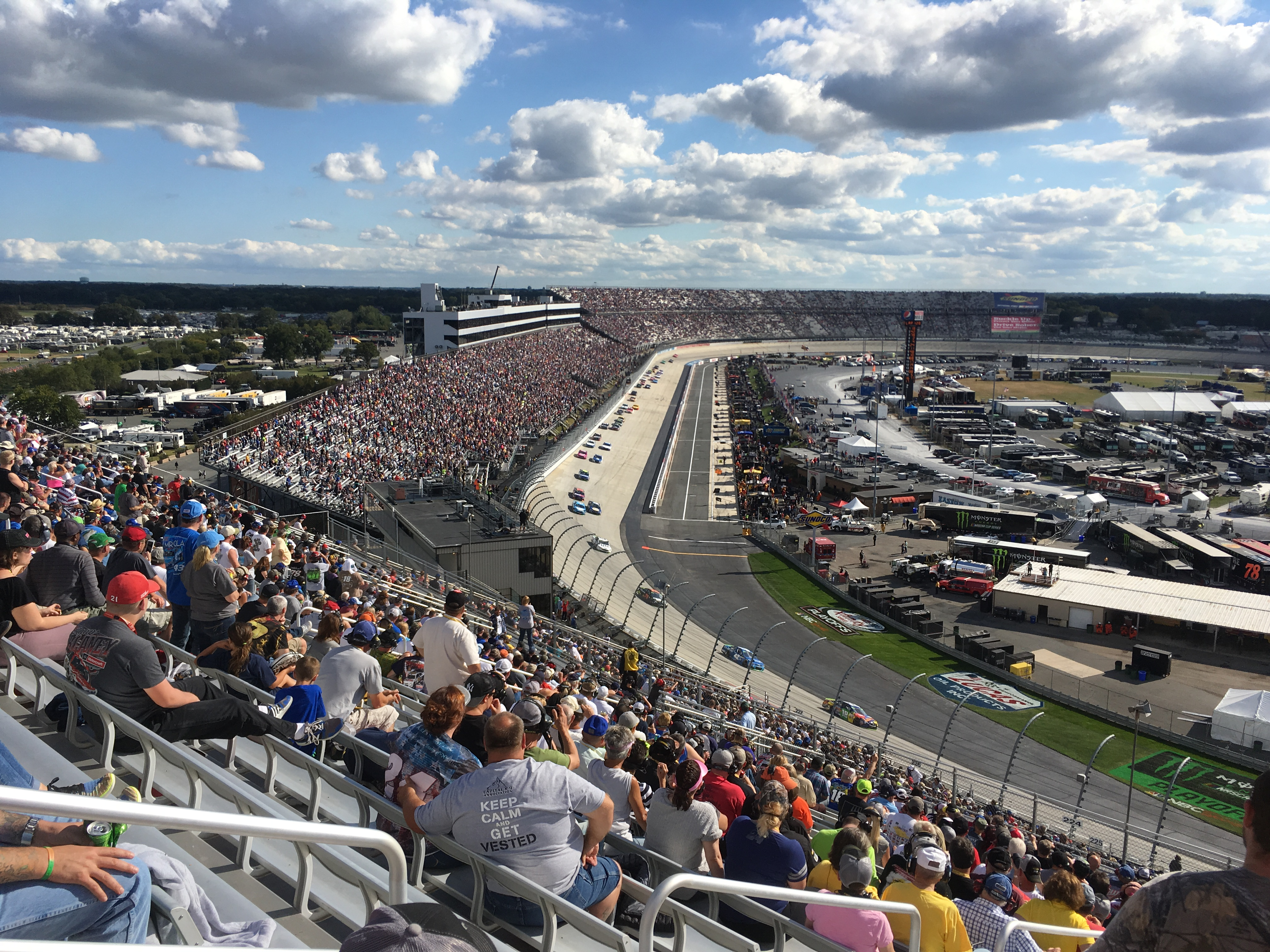
2017 Apache Warrior 400, won by Kyle Busch

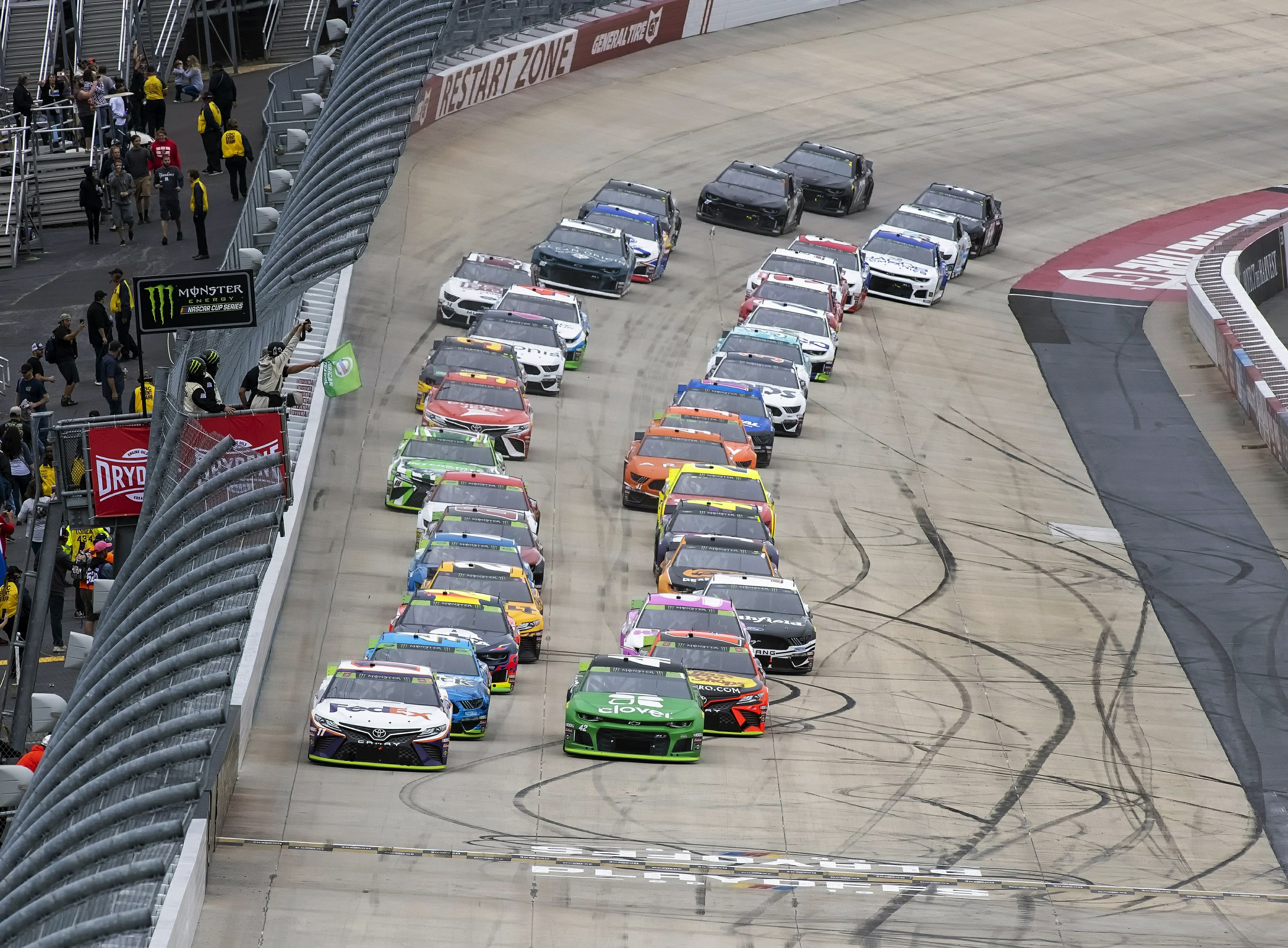
2019 Drydene 400, won by Kyle Larson

- 1971: Bobby Allison dominated the race until a lug bolt broke on a pit stop, putting Richard Petty into the lead in the final 100 laps en route to the win.
- 1975: Richard Petty put the entire field two laps down until at Lap 350 he ran over debris from a backmarker's blown engine that broke a tie rod. Petty spent eight laps in the pits getting a new tie rod and came out six laps down. While Lennie Pond blew his engine Petty erased all six laps, but needed a late yellow when Buddy Arrington stopped on the track with fifteen to go. Petty breezed to the win, leaving runner-up Dick Brooks angry at Arrington, who'd recently purchased a transporter from Petty Enterprises: "I guess Arrington needed that truck paid for."
- 1976: Cale Yarborough lost two laps on two separate occasions and made them up en route to the win.
- 1977: Benny Parsons dominated the race after Lap 250.
- 1978: Bobby Allison won after a recent visit to the Mayo Clinic for a checkup.
- 1979: Richard Petty, Donnie Allison, and Cale Yarborough battled over the final 30 laps; Petty edged Allison by a hood at the stripe.
- 1980: Darrell Waltrip took the win, his final for DiGard Racing.
- 1981: Neil Bonnett stormed to his second win in the 1981 season's last three races as hard-luck Harry Gant led 178 laps but blew his engine with 63 laps to go.
- 1983: Bobby Allison edged Geoff Bodine for the win, his sixth of the season en route to his only Winston Cup title.
- 1986: Ricky Rudd took his first Dover win as title contenders Dale Earnhardt and Tim Richmond crashed and raced each other with damaged race cars despite being multiple laps down.
- 1991: Multiple crashes put Harry Gant alone on the lead lap for his third straight win of September 1991.
- 1992: Ricky Rudd edged Bill Elliott as Alan Kulwicki crashed, putting him seemingly out of the season point chase.
- 1993: Tire failures and crashes, including a multi-car melee detonated when Rusty Wallace hammered another car into the path of the leaders, plagued the 1993 500 won by Wallace.
- 1995: In a race with only five yellows flags, Jeff Gordon and Bobby Hamilton dominated en route to a 1-2 finish.
- 1996: Gordon and Dale Earnhardt battled amid an epidemic of crashes. Ernie Irvan crashed ahead of Derrike Cope and crew chief Larry McReynolds attacked Cope in the garage area. A three-car melee led to a near-brawl on the track between Jimmy Spencer and Wally Dallenbach Jr. Following this race NASCAR raised the sanction fee for a 500-mile race, forcing Dover to cut back to 400 miles.
- 1998: Mark Martin won while Matt Kenseth finished sixth in his first career start; Kenseth substituted for Bill Elliott, who missed the race for his father's funeral.
- 2000: Tony Stewart went on to win the season sweep at Dover. This race also marked the first career start for driver Kurt Busch who replaced driver Chad Little in the John Deere Ford.
- 2001: In the first NASCAR sanctioned Cup race following the September 11 attacks, (the previous race scheduled for New Hampshire Speedway was postponed until the end of the season) a silent lap 3, which was a season-long scheduled event in memory of Dale Earnhardt who had died in a crash in the 2001 Daytona 500, was changed to include the memory of the victims of the attacks. Dale Earnhardt Jr. won the race and celebrated by doing a Polish victory lap while holding an American flag in salute. Notably, the white flag was not waved on the final lap, causing some confusion with the television broadcasting team.
- 2006: Jeff Burton broke a 175 race winless streak passing Matt Kenseth with 8 laps to go. This was a very emotional win for Jeff.
- 2009: Joey Logano flipped 8 times in turn 3 after being tapped by Tony Stewart, though a couple cars ahead of Logano had braked going into the corner. Logano suffered no injuries from the wreck.
- 2012: Brad Keselowski's win marked the last win for Dodge.
- 2013: Jimmie Johnson held off Dale Earnhardt Jr. to take his eighth win at Dover, breaking a tie with Richard Petty and Bobby Allison for most all-time wins at the track. For Johnson, it allowed him to redeem himself for the restart line violation (when he'd jumped Juan Pablo Montoya on a late restart with 20 laps to go) that had cost him a shot at winning the race in June.
- 2017: Chase Elliott dominated the final stage of the race and was on the way to his first career win until Kyle Busch passed him coming to the white flag. Kyle Busch won the race for his second consecutive win and fourth of the season.
- 2018: After Chase Elliott lost the race the year before in the closing laps, he found redemption by fending off Denny Hamlin in a green-white-checkered finish on older tires. It was Elliott's first win on an oval, since his first Cup win was on a road course.
- 1974: Race shortened due to energy crisis.
- 2007, 2019, 2022, and 2023: Races postponed from Sunday to Monday due to rain.
- 2015, 2017, and 2025: Races extended due to NASCAR overtime.
- 2020: Race postponed from May 3 and ran as a twin-race event with regularly scheduled fall race on August 23 due to COVID-19 pandemic. Both races shortened to 500 kilometres (310.686 mi).

=== Past winners ===
Year	Date	No.	Driver	Team	Manufacturer	Race Distance		Race Time	Average Speed (mph)	Report	Ref
Year	Date	No.	Driver	Team	Manufacturer	Laps	Miles (km)	Race Time	Average Speed (mph)	Report	Ref
1971	October 17	43	Richard Petty	Petty Enterprises	Plymouth	500	500 (804.672)	4:03:25	123.254	Report	
1972	September 17	21	David Pearson	Wood Brothers Racing	Mercury	500	500 (804.672)	4:08:57	120.506	Report	
1973	September 16	21	David Pearson	Wood Brothers Racing	Mercury	500	500 (804.672)	4:25:50	112.852	Report	
1974	September 15	43	Richard Petty	Petty Enterprises	Dodge	500	500 (804.672)	4:23:59	113.64	Report	
1975	September 14	43	Richard Petty	Petty Enterprises	Dodge	500	500 (804.672)	4:29:22	111.372	Report	
1976	September 19	11	Cale Yarborough	Junior Johnson & Associates	Chevrolet	500	500 (804.672)	4:19:12	115.74	Report	
1977	September 18	72	Benny Parsons	L. G. DeWitt	Chevrolet	500	500 (804.672)	4:21:32	114.708	Report	
1978	September 17	15	Bobby Allison	Bud Moore Engineering	Ford	500	500 (804.672)	4:11:20	119.323	Report	
1979	September 16	43	Richard Petty	Petty Enterprises	Chevrolet	500	500 (804.672)	4:22:19	114.366	Report	
1980	September 14	88	Darrell Waltrip	DiGard Motorsports	Chevrolet	500	500 (804.672)	4:18:34	116.024	Report	
1981	September 20	21	Neil Bonnett	Wood Brothers Racing	Ford	500	500 (804.672)	4:10:00	119.561	Report	
1982	September 19	11	Darrell Waltrip	Junior Johnson & Associates	Buick	500	500 (804.672)	4:38:43	107.642	Report	
1983	September 18	22	Bobby Allison	DiGard Motorsports	Buick	500	500 (804.672)	4:18:45	116.077	Report	
1984	September 16	33	Harry Gant	Mach 1 Racing	Chevrolet	500	500 (804.672)	4:28:12	111.856	Report	
1985	September 15	33	Harry Gant	Mach 1 Racing	Chevrolet	500	500 (804.672)	4:08:52	120.538	Report	
1986	September 14	15	Ricky Rudd	Bud Moore Engineering	Ford	500	500 (804.672)	4:22:24	114.329	Report	
1987	September 20	15	Ricky Rudd	Bud Moore Engineering	Ford	500	500 (804.672)	4:00:34	124.706	Report	
1988	September 18	9	Bill Elliott	Melling Racing	Ford	500	500 (804.672)	4:34:21	109.349	Report	
1989	September 17	3	Dale Earnhardt	Richard Childress Racing	Chevrolet	500	500 (804.672)	4:04:05	122.909	Report	
1990	September 16	9	Bill Elliott	Melling Racing	Ford	500	500 (804.672)	3:58:00	125.945	Report	
1991	September 15	33	Harry Gant	Andy Petree Racing	Oldsmobile	500	500 (804.672)	4:32:17	110.179	Report	
1992	September 20	5	Ricky Rudd	Hendrick Motorsports	Chevrolet	500	500 (804.672)	4:20:13	115.289	Report	
1993	September 19	2	Rusty Wallace	Penske Racing	Pontiac	500	500 (804.672)	4:59:00	100.334	Report	
1994	September 18	2	Rusty Wallace	Penske Racing	Ford	500	500 (804.672)	4:26:32	112.556	Report	
1995	September 17	24	Jeff Gordon	Hendrick Motorsports	Chevrolet	500	500 (804.672)	4:00:30	124.74	Report	
1996	September 15	24	Jeff Gordon	Hendrick Motorsports	Chevrolet	500	500 (804.672)	4:43:58	105.646	Report	
1997	September 21	6	Mark Martin	Roush Racing	Ford	400	400 (643.737)	3:00:50	132.719	Report	
1998	September 20	6	Mark Martin	Roush Racing	Ford	400	400 (643.737)	3:30:50	113.834	Report	
1999	September 26	6	Mark Martin	Roush Racing	Ford	400	400 (643.737)	3:08:20	127.434	Report	
2000	September 24	20	Tony Stewart	Joe Gibbs Racing	Pontiac	400	400 (643.737)	3:28:21	115.191	Report	
2001	September 23	8	Dale Earnhardt Jr.	Dale Earnhardt, Inc.	Chevrolet	400	400 (643.737)	3:56:19	101.559	Report	
2002	September 22	48	Jimmie Johnson	Hendrick Motorsports	Chevrolet	400	400 (643.737)	3:18:40	120.805	Report	
2003	September 21	12	Ryan Newman	Penske Racing	Dodge	400	400 (643.737)	3:40:35	108.802	Report	
2004	September 26	12	Ryan Newman	Penske Racing	Dodge	400	400 (643.737)	3:21:34	119.067	Report	
2005	September 25	48	Jimmie Johnson	Hendrick Motorsports	Chevrolet	404*	404 (650.174)	3:30:41	115.054	Report	
2006	September 24	31	Jeff Burton	Richard Childress Racing	Chevrolet	400	400 (643.737)	3:34:21	111.966	Report	
2007	September 23	99	Carl Edwards	Roush Fenway Racing	Ford	400	400 (643.737)	3:55:39	101.846	Report	
2008	September 21	16	Greg Biffle	Roush Fenway Racing	Ford	400	400 (643.737)	3:30:13	114.168	Report	
2009	September 27	48	Jimmie Johnson	Hendrick Motorsports	Chevrolet	400	400 (643.737)	3:22:11	118.704	Report	
2010	September 26	48	Jimmie Johnson	Hendrick Motorsports	Chevrolet	400	400 (643.737)	3:02:27	131.543	Report	
2011	October 2	22	Kurt Busch	Penske Racing	Dodge	400	400 (643.737)	3:30:59	119.413	Report	
2012	September 30	2	Brad Keselowski	Penske Racing	Dodge*	400	400 (643.737)	3:11:53	125.076	Report	
2013	September 29	48	Jimmie Johnson	Hendrick Motorsports	Chevrolet	400	400 (643.737)	3:03:20	130.909	Report	
2014	September 28	24	Jeff Gordon	Hendrick Motorsports	Chevrolet	400	400 (643.737)	3:03:51	130.541	Report	
2015	October 4	4	Kevin Harvick	Stewart–Haas Racing	Chevrolet	400	400 (643.737)	3:20:13	119.87	Report	
2016	October 2	78	Martin Truex Jr.	Furniture Row Racing	Toyota	400	400 (643.737)	3:03:15	130.969	Report	
2017	October 1	18	Kyle Busch	Joe Gibbs Racing	Toyota	400	400 (643.737)	3:05:48	129.171	Report	
2018	October 7	9	Chase Elliott	Hendrick Motorsports	Chevrolet	404*	404 (650.174)	3:18:02	122.404	Report	
2019	October 6	42	Kyle Larson	Chip Ganassi Racing	Chevrolet	400	400 (643.737)	2:56:49	135.734	Report	
2020	August 23	4	Kevin Harvick	Stewart–Haas Racing	Ford	311	311 (500.506)	2:48:07	110.994	Report	

- 1997: Race shortened to 400 miles (643.738 km).
- 2005 and 2018: Race extended due to a NASCAR Overtime finish.
- 2020: Race shortened to 500 kilometres (310.686 mi) due to schedule changes resulting from the COVID-19 pandemic.

=== Multiple winners (drivers) ===
# Wins	Driver	Years won
5	Jimmie Johnson	2002, 2005, 2009–2010, 2013
4	Richard Petty	1971, 1974–1975, 1979
3	Harry Gant	1984–1985, 1991
3	Ricky Rudd	1986–1987, 1992
3	Mark Martin	1997–1999
3	Jeff Gordon	1995–1996, 2014
2	David Pearson	1972–1973
2	Darrell Waltrip	1980, 1982
2	Bobby Allison	1978, 1983
2	Bill Elliott	1988, 1990
2	Rusty Wallace	1993–1994
2	Ryan Newman	2003–2004
2	Kevin Harvick	2015, 2020

=== Multiple winners (teams) ===
# Wins	Team	Years won
10	Hendrick Motorsports	1992, 1995–1996, 2002, 2005, 2009–2010, 2013–2014, 2018
6	Penske Racing	1993–1994, 2003–2004, 2011–2012
5	Roush Fenway Racing	1997–1999, 2007–2008
4	Petty Enterprises	1971, 1974–1975, 1979
3	Wood Brothers Racing	1972–1973, 1981
3	Bud Moore Engineering	1978, 1986–1987
2	Junior Johnson & Associates	1976, 1982
2	DiGard Motorsports	1980, 1983
2	Mach 1 Racing	1984–1985
2	Melling Racing	1988, 1990
2	Richard Childress Racing	1989, 2006
2	Joe Gibbs Racing	2000, 2017
2	Stewart–Haas Racing	2015, 2020

=== Manufacturer wins ===
# Wins	Manufacturer	Years won
21	Chevrolet	1976–1977, 1979–1980, 1984–1985, 1989, 1992, 1995–1996, 2001–2002, 2005–2006, 2009–2010, 2013–2015, 2018–2019
13	Ford	1978, 1981, 1986–1988, 1990, 1994, 1997–1999, 2007–2008, 2020
6	Dodge	1974–1975, 2003–2004, 2011–2012
2	Mercury	1972–1973
2	Buick	1982–1983
2	Pontiac	1993, 2000
2	Toyota	2016–2017
1	Plymouth	1971
1	Oldsmobile	1991

Previous race: AdventHealth 400	NASCAR Cup Series; Ecosave 400	Next race: NASCAR All-Star Race (exhibition); Coca-Cola 600 (points)
