= 1988 Coca-Cola 600 =

Tenth race of the 1988 NASCAR Winston Cup Series

Race details
- Race 10 of 29 in the 1988 NASCAR Winston Cup Series
- The 1988 Coca-Cola 600 program cover, featuring Dale Earnhardt, Bill Elliott, Bobby Allison, and Cale Yarborough. Artwork by NASCAR artist Sam Bass.
- Date: May 29, 1988
- Official name: 29th Annual Coca-Cola 600
- Location: Concord, North Carolina, Charlotte Motor Speedway
- Course: Permanent racing facility
- Course length: 1.5 miles (2.414 km)
- Distance: 400 laps, 600 mi (965.606 km)
- Average speed: 124.46 miles per hour (200.30 km/h)
- Attendance: 165,000

Pole position
Driver	Davey Allison	Ranier-Lundy Racing
- Time: 31.107

Most laps led
Driver	Rick Wilson	Morgan–McClure Motorsports
- Laps: 106

Winner
No. 17	Darrell Waltrip	Hendrick Motorsports

Television in the United States
- Network: TBS
- Announcers: Ken Squier, Johnny Hayes

Radio in the United States
- Radio: Performance Racing Network

The 1988 Coca-Cola 600 was the tenth stock car race of the 1988 NASCAR Winston Cup Series season and the 29th iteration of the event. The race was held on Sunday, May 29, 1988, before an audience of 165,000 in Concord, North Carolina, at Charlotte Motor Speedway, a 1.5 miles (2.4 km) permanent quad-oval. The race took the scheduled 400 laps to complete. On the final restart with nine laps left in the race, Hendrick Motorsports driver Darrell Waltrip would manage to fend off the field to take his 72nd career NASCAR Winston Cup Series victory and his first victory of the season. To fill out the top three, Blue Max Racing driver Rusty Wallace and owner-driver Alan Kulwicki would finish second and third, respectively.

The race was marred by a series of tire failures that had lasted throughout the entire race. With almost every starter for the race deciding to run tires made by Hoosier Racing Tire (with Dave Marcis being the only exception, deciding to instead run tires made by the Goodyear Tire and Rubber Company), numerous drivers suffered tire blowouts. Notable drivers who suffered tire blowouts include Harry Gant, Neil Bonnett, and Rick Wilson, all of whom had to be hospitalized after their accidents. Marcis did not suffer any tire failures, but still failed to finish after Sterling Marlin also suffered a tire failure and collected Marcis in the process. The increased amount of tire blowouts was blamed on an increase of both track temperature and higher speeds than Hoosier had expected, according to the company's CEO, Bob Newton.

== Background ==
The layout of Charlotte Motor Speedway, the venue where the race was held.

Charlotte Motor Speedway is a motorsports complex located in Concord, North Carolina, United States 13 miles from Charlotte, North Carolina. The complex features a 1.5 miles (2.4 km) quad oval track that hosts NASCAR racing including the prestigious Coca-Cola 600 on Memorial Day weekend and the NEXTEL All-Star Challenge, as well as the UAW-GM Quality 500. The speedway was built in 1959 by Bruton Smith and is considered the home track for NASCAR with many race teams located in the Charlotte area. The track is owned and operated by Speedway Motorsports Inc. (SMI) with Marcus G. Smith (son of Bruton Smith) as track president.

=== Entry list ===
- (R) denotes rookie driver.

#	Driver	Team	Make	Sponsor
00	Gary Brooks	Brooks Racing	Chevrolet	Brooks Racing
2	Ernie Irvan (R)	U.S. Racing	Chevrolet	Kroger
3	Dale Earnhardt	Richard Childress Racing	Chevrolet	GM Goodwrench
4	Rick Wilson	Morgan–McClure Motorsports	Oldsmobile	Kodak
5	Geoff Bodine	Hendrick Motorsports	Chevrolet	Levi Garrett
6	Mark Martin	Roush Racing	Ford	Stroh's Light
7	Alan Kulwicki	AK Racing	Ford	Zerex
8	Bobby Hillin Jr.	Stavola Brothers Racing	Buick	Miller High Life
9	Bill Elliott	Melling Racing	Ford	Coors Light
10	Ken Bouchard (R)	Whitcomb Racing	Chevrolet	Whitcomb Racing
11	Terry Labonte	Junior Johnson & Associates	Chevrolet	Budweiser
12	Bobby Allison	Stavola Brothers Racing	Buick	Miller High Life
15	Brett Bodine	Bud Moore Engineering	Ford	Crisco
16	Larry Pearson	Pearson Racing	Chevrolet	Chattanooga Chew
17	Darrell Waltrip	Hendrick Motorsports	Chevrolet	Tide
21	Kyle Petty	Wood Brothers Racing	Ford	Citgo
23	Eddie Bierschwale	B&B Racing	Oldsmobile	Wayne Paging
25	Ken Schrader	Hendrick Motorsports	Chevrolet	Folgers
26	Ricky Rudd	King Racing	Buick	Quaker State
27	Rusty Wallace	Blue Max Racing	Pontiac	Kodiak
28	Davey Allison	Ranier-Lundy Racing	Ford	Texaco, Havoline
29	Cale Yarborough	Cale Yarborough Motorsports	Oldsmobile	Hardee's
30	Michael Waltrip	Bahari Racing	Pontiac	Country Time
31	Brad Teague (Note: Teague was fired after first-round qualifying, with Joe Ruttman replacing Teague for second-round qualifying and the race.)	Bob Clark Motorsports	Oldsmobile	Slender You Figure Salons
33	Harry Gant	Mach 1 Racing	Chevrolet	Skoal Bandit
34	Donnie Allison	AAG Racing	Chevrolet	Allen's Associated Glass
36	H. B. Bailey	Bailey Racing	Pontiac	Almeda Auto Parts
40	Ben Hess	Hess Racing	Oldsmobile	Hess Racing
43	Richard Petty	Petty Enterprises	Pontiac	STP
44	Sterling Marlin	Hagan Racing	Oldsmobile	Piedmont Airlines
47	Morgan Shepherd	Shepherd Racing	Buick	Winner's Circle Auto Products
50	Greg Sacks	Dingman Brothers Racing	Pontiac	Dingman Brothers Racing
52	Jimmy Means	Jimmy Means Racing	Chevrolet	Eureka
55	Phil Parsons	Jackson Bros. Motorsports	Oldsmobile	Skoal, Crown Central Petroleum
64	Mike Potter	Potter Racing	Chevrolet	Potter Racing
67	Dale Jarrett	Arrington Racing	Chevrolet	Raven Boats, Bud Light
68	Derrike Cope	Testa Racing	Ford	Purolator
70	J. D. McDuffie	McDuffie Racing	Pontiac	Rumple Furniture
71	Dave Marcis	Marcis Auto Racing	Chevrolet	Lifebuoy
75	Neil Bonnett	RahMoc Enterprises	Pontiac	Valvoline
80	Jimmy Horton (R)	S&H Racing	Ford	S&H Racing
82	Mark Stahl	Stahl Racing	Ford	Auto Bell Car Wash
83	Lake Speed	Speed Racing	Oldsmobile	Wynn's, Kmart
87	Randy Baker	Buck Baker Racing	Oldsmobile	Sony Magnetic Products
88	Buddy Baker	Baker–Schiff Racing	Oldsmobile	Red Baron Frozen Pizza
89	Jim Sauter	Mueller Brothers Racing	Pontiac	Evinrude Outboard Motors
90	Benny Parsons	Donlavey Racing	Ford	Bull's-Eye Barbecue Sauce
93	Charlie Baker	Salmon Racing	Chevrolet	Salmon Racing
95	Slick Johnson	Sadler Brothers Racing	Chevrolet	Sadler Brothers Racing
97	Rodney Combs	Winkle Motorsports	Buick	AC Spark Plug
98	Brad Noffsinger (R)	Curb Racing	Buick	Sunoco
99	Connie Saylor	Ball Motorsports	Chevrolet	Ball Motorsports

== Qualifying ==
Qualifying was split into two rounds. The first round was held on Wednesday, May 27, at 3:00 PM EST. Each driver would have one lap to set a time. During the first round, the top 20 drivers in the round would be guaranteed a starting spot in the race. If a driver was not able to guarantee a spot in the first round, they had the option to scrub their time from the first round and try and run a faster lap time in a second round qualifying run, held on Thursday, May 28, at 2:00 PM EST. As with the first round, each driver would have one lap to set a time. For this specific race, positions 21-40 would be decided on time, and depending on who needed it, a select amount of positions were given to cars who had not otherwise qualified but were high enough in owner's points; up to two were given.

Davey Allison, driving for Ranier-Lundy Racing, would win the pole, setting a time of 31.107 and an average speed of 173.594 miles per hour (279.372 km/h) in the first round.

11 drivers would fail to qualify.

=== Full qualifying results ===
Pos.	#	Driver	Team	Make	Time	Speed
1	28	Davey Allison	Ranier-Lundy Racing	Ford	31.107	173.594
2	5	Geoff Bodine	Hendrick Motorsports	Chevrolet	31.300	172.524
3	11	Terry Labonte	Junior Johnson & Associates	Chevrolet	31.447	171.717
4	12	Bobby Allison	Stavola Brothers Racing	Buick	31.455	171.674
5	17	Darrell Waltrip	Hendrick Motorsports	Chevrolet	31.480	171.537
6	9	Bill Elliott	Melling Racing	Ford	31.511	171.369
7	3	Dale Earnhardt	Richard Childress Racing	Chevrolet	31.550	171.157
8	6	Mark Martin	Roush Racing	Ford	31.556	171.124
9	7	Alan Kulwicki	AK Racing	Ford	31.590	170.940
10	4	Rick Wilson	Morgan–McClure Motorsports	Oldsmobile	31.593	170.924
11	27	Rusty Wallace	Blue Max Racing	Pontiac	31.599	170.891
12	55	Phil Parsons	Jackson Bros. Motorsports	Oldsmobile	31.622	170.767
13	21	Kyle Petty	Wood Brothers Racing	Ford	31.622	170.767
14	15	Brett Bodine	Bud Moore Engineering	Ford	31.636	170.692
15	83	Lake Speed	Speed Racing	Oldsmobile	31.638	170.681
16	47	Morgan Shepherd	Shepherd Racing	Buick	31.675	170.481
17	89	Jim Sauter	Mueller Brothers Racing	Pontiac	31.685	170.428
18	90	Benny Parsons	Donlavey Racing	Ford	31.699	170.352
19	25	Ken Schrader	Hendrick Motorsports	Chevrolet	31.725	170.213
20	44	Sterling Marlin	Hagan Racing	Oldsmobile	31.772	169.961
Failed to lock in Round 1
21	33	Harry Gant	Mach 1 Racing	Chevrolet	31.723	170.223
22	30	Michael Waltrip	Bahari Racing	Pontiac	31.813	169.742
23	2	Ernie Irvan (R)	U.S. Racing	Chevrolet	31.921	169.168
24	10	Ken Bouchard (R)	Whitcomb Racing	Ford	31.939	169.072
25	31	Joe Ruttman	Bob Clark Motorsports	Oldsmobile	31.943	169.051
26	80	Jimmy Horton (R)	S&H Racing	Ford	31.966	168.929
27	88	Buddy Baker	Baker–Schiff Racing	Oldsmobile	31.972	168.898
28	8	Bobby Hillin Jr.	Stavola Brothers Racing	Buick	31.993	168.787
29	68	Derrike Cope	Testa Racing	Ford	32.021	168.639
30	43	Richard Petty	Petty Enterprises	Pontiac	32.024	168.624
31	75	Neil Bonnett	RahMoc Enterprises	Pontiac	32.052	168.476
32	23	Eddie Bierschwale	B&B Racing	Oldsmobile	32.084	168.308
33	29	Cale Yarborough	Cale Yarborough Motorsports	Oldsmobile	32.126	168.088
34	26	Mike Alexander (Note: Alexander would replace Ricky Rudd for the race's qualifying sessions, after Rudd suffered torn ligaments in his left knee during the 1988 The Winston. While Rudd would manage to start the race, he was replaced by Alexander midway into the race.)	King Racing	Buick	32.161	167.905
35	36	H. B. Bailey	Bailey Racing	Pontiac	32.175	167.832
36	50	Greg Sacks	Dingman Brothers Racing	Pontiac	32.181	167.801
37	52	Jimmy Means	Jimmy Means Racing	Pontiac	32.203	167.686
38	71	Dave Marcis	Marcis Auto Racing	Chevrolet	32.261	167.385
39	67	Dale Jarrett	Arrington Racing	Chevrolet	32.276	167.307
40	97	Rodney Combs	Winkle Motorsports	Buick	32.281	167.281
Provisional
41	98	Brad Noffsinger (R)	Curb Racing	Buick	32.281	167.281
Failed to qualify
42	34	Donnie Allison	AAG Racing	Chevrolet	-*	-*
43	40	Ben Hess	Hess Racing	Oldsmobile	-*	-*
44	99	Connie Saylor	Ball Motorsports	Chevrolet	-*	-*
45	64	Mike Potter	Potter Racing	Chevrolet	-*	-*
46	70	J. D. McDuffie	McDuffie Racing	Pontiac	-*	-*
47	93	Charlie Baker	Salmon Racing	Chevrolet	-*	-*
48	82	Mark Stahl	Stahl Racing	Ford	-*	-*
49	95	Slick Johnson	Sadler Brothers Racing	Chevrolet	-*	-*
50	87	Randy Baker	Buck Baker Racing	Oldsmobile	-*	-*
51	00	Gary Brooks	Brooks Racing	Chevrolet	-*	-*
52	16	Larry Pearson (Note: Pearson would crash in first-round qualifying. With a lack of a backup car, Pearson would withdraw from the event.)	Pearson Racing	Chevrolet	-	-
Official first round qualifying results
Official starting lineup

== Race results ==
Fin	St	#	Driver	Team	Make	Laps	Led	Status	Pts	Winnings
1	5	17	Darrell Waltrip	Hendrick Motorsports	Chevrolet	400	73	running	180	$104,250
2	11	27	Rusty Wallace	Blue Max Racing	Pontiac	400	4	running	175	$56,425
3	9	7	Alan Kulwicki	AK Racing	Ford	400	12	running	170	$38,100
4	14	15	Brett Bodine	Bud Moore Engineering	Ford	400	96	running	165	$49,305
5	1	28	Davey Allison	Ranier-Lundy Racing	Ford	400	27	running	160	$62,050
6	19	25	Ken Schrader	Hendrick Motorsports	Chevrolet	400	1	running	155	$23,900
7	34	26	Ricky Rudd	King Racing	Buick	399	0	running	146	$17,050
8	12	55	Phil Parsons	Jackson Bros. Motorsports	Oldsmobile	398	1	running	147	$15,550
9	3	11	Terry Labonte	Junior Johnson & Associates	Chevrolet	397	0	running	138	$22,600
10	36	50	Greg Sacks	Dingman Brothers Racing	Pontiac	396	0	running	134	$10,900
11	24	10	Ken Bouchard (R)	Whitcomb Racing	Ford	396	0	running	130	$9,325
12	37	52	Jimmy Means	Jimmy Means Racing	Pontiac	395	6	running	132	$12,765
13	7	3	Dale Earnhardt	Richard Childress Racing	Chevrolet	394	0	running	124	$19,205
14	28	8	Bobby Hillin Jr.	Stavola Brothers Racing	Buick	393	0	running	121	$11,045
15	30	43	Richard Petty	Petty Enterprises	Pontiac	392	1	running	123	$10,985
16	13	21	Kyle Petty	Wood Brothers Racing	Ford	375	0	engine	115	$13,000
17	4	12	Bobby Allison	Stavola Brothers Racing	Buick	365	19	running	117	$17,750
18	10	4	Rick Wilson	Morgan–McClure Motorsports	Oldsmobile	353	106	accident	119	$13,950
19	6	9	Bill Elliott	Melling Racing	Ford	340	17	running	111	$17,200
20	25	31	Joe Ruttman	Bob Clark Motorsports	Oldsmobile	339	0	running	0	$5,500
21	15	83	Lake Speed	Speed Racing	Oldsmobile	338	0	running	100	$4,600
22	23	2	Ernie Irvan (R)	U.S. Racing	Chevrolet	328	0	running	97	$5,950
23	22	30	Michael Waltrip	Bahari Racing	Pontiac	326	0	running	94	$7,400
24	2	5	Geoff Bodine	Hendrick Motorsports	Chevrolet	317	1	running	96	$12,100
25	18	90	Benny Parsons	Donlavey Racing	Ford	294	0	engine	88	$6,700
26	16	47	Morgan Shepherd	Shepherd Racing	Buick	270	0	engine	85	$3,000
27	20	44	Sterling Marlin	Hagan Racing	Oldsmobile	247	18	running	87	$6,400
28	32	23	Eddie Bierschwale	B&B Racing	Oldsmobile	243	0	accident	79	$2,400
29	27	88	Buddy Baker	Baker–Schiff Racing	Oldsmobile	243	6	accident	81	$5,350
30	21	33	Harry Gant	Mach 1 Racing	Chevrolet	231	10	accident	78	$5,900
31	26	80	Jimmy Horton (R)	S&H Racing	Ford	230	0	engine	70	$2,200
32	40	97	Rodney Combs	Winkle Motorsports	Buick	227	0	engine	67	$2,600
33	41	98	Brad Noffsinger (R)	Curb Racing	Buick	191	1	accident	69	$2,000
34	38	71	Dave Marcis	Marcis Auto Racing	Chevrolet	166	1	accident	66	$4,625
35	35	36	H. B. Bailey	Bailey Racing	Pontiac	155	0	engine	58	$1,750
36	31	75	Neil Bonnett	RahMoc Enterprises	Pontiac	113	0	accident	55	$8,700
37	8	6	Mark Martin	Roush Racing	Ford	83	0	engine	52	$2,150
38	33	29	Cale Yarborough	Cale Yarborough Motorsports	Oldsmobile	58	0	accident	49	$1,625
39	17	89	Jim Sauter	Mueller Brothers Racing	Pontiac	57	0	accident	46	$1,600
40	29	68	Derrike Cope	Testa Racing	Ford	57	0	accident	43	$2,275
41	39	67	Dale Jarrett	Arrington Racing	Chevrolet	27	0	engine	40	$4,200
Failed to qualify
42		34	Donnie Allison	AAG Racing	Chevrolet					
43		40	Ben Hess	Hess Racing	Oldsmobile					
44		99	Connie Saylor	Ball Motorsports	Chevrolet					
45		64	Mike Potter	Potter Racing	Chevrolet					
46		70	J. D. McDuffie	McDuffie Racing	Pontiac					
47		93	Charlie Baker	Salmon Racing	Chevrolet					
48		82	Mark Stahl	Stahl Racing	Ford					
49		95	Slick Johnson	Sadler Brothers Racing	Chevrolet					
50		87	Randy Baker	Buck Baker Racing	Oldsmobile					
51		00	Gary Brooks	Brooks Racing	Chevrolet					
52		16	Larry Pearson	Pearson Racing	Chevrolet					
Official race results

== Standings after the race ==
Drivers' Championship standings

	Pos	Driver	Points
	1	Dale Earnhardt	1,506
4	2	Rusty Wallace	1,435 (-71)
1	3	Sterling Marlin	1,409 (-97)
	4	Terry Labonte	1,400 (–106)
2	5	Bill Elliott	1,386 (–120)
1	6	Bobby Allison	1,377 (–129)
2	7	Ken Schrader	1,328 (–178)
2	8	Bobby Hillin Jr.	1,275 (–231)
2	9	Geoff Bodine	1,271 (–235)
2	10	Darrell Waltrip	1,264 (–242)
Official driver's standings

- Note: Only the first 10 positions are included for the driver standings.

== Notes ==
Previous race: 1988 Winston 500	NASCAR Winston Cup Series; 1988 season	Next race: 1988 Budweiser 500
