= 1990 Coca-Cola 600 =

Tenth race of the 1990 NASCAR Winston Cup Series

Race details
- Race 10 of 29 in the 1990 NASCAR Winston Cup Series
- The 1990 Coca-Cola 600 program cover, featuring Darrell Waltrip. Artwork by NASCAR artist Sam Bass.
- Date: May 27, 1990
- Official name: 31st Annual Coca-Cola 600
- Location: Concord, North Carolina, Charlotte Motor Speedway
- Course: Permanent racing facility
- Course length: 1.5 miles (2.414 km)
- Distance: 400 laps, 600 mi (965.606 km)
- Average speed: 137.65 miles per hour (221.53 km/h)
- Attendance: 160,000

Pole position
Driver	Ken Schrader	Hendrick Motorsports
- Time: 31.041

Most laps led
Driver	Rusty Wallace	Blue Max Racing
- Laps: 306

Winner
No. 27	Rusty Wallace	Blue Max Racing

Television in the United States
- Network: TBS
- Announcers: Ken Squier, Neil Bonnett, Lyn St. James

Radio in the United States
- Radio: Performance Racing Network

The 1990 Coca-Cola 600 was the tenth stock car race of the 1990 NASCAR Winston Cup Series season and the 31st iteration of the event. The race was held on Sunday, May 27, 1990, before an audience of 160,000 in Concord, North Carolina, at Charlotte Motor Speedway, a 1.5 miles (2.4 km) permanent quad-oval. The race took the scheduled 400 laps to complete. In a one-lap shootout to the finish, Blue Max Racing driver Rusty Wallace would manage to fend off the field to complete a dominant run throughout the race, leading 306 of the 400 laps in the race. The victory was Wallace's 17th career NASCAR Winston Cup Series victory and his first victory of the season. To fill out the top three, Melling Racing driver Bill Elliott and Roush Racing driver Mark Martin would finish second and third, respectively.

== Background ==
The layout of Charlotte Motor Speedway, the venue where the race was held.

Charlotte Motor Speedway is a motorsports complex located in Concord, North Carolina, United States 13 miles (21 km) from Charlotte, North Carolina. The complex features a 1.5 miles (2.4 km) quad oval track that hosts NASCAR racing including the prestigious Coca-Cola 600 on Memorial Day weekend and the NEXTEL All-Star Challenge, as well as the UAW-GM Quality 500. The speedway was built in 1959 by Bruton Smith and is considered the home track for NASCAR with many race teams located in the Charlotte area. The track is owned and operated by Speedway Motorsports Inc. (SMI) with Marcus G. Smith (son of Bruton Smith) as track president.

=== Entry list ===
- (R) denotes rookie driver.

#	Driver	Team	Make
1	Terry Labonte	Precision Products Racing	Oldsmobile
01	Mickey Gibbs	Gibbs Racing	Ford
2	Rick Mast	U.S. Racing	Pontiac
3	Dale Earnhardt	Richard Childress Racing	Chevrolet
4	Ernie Irvan	Morgan–McClure Motorsports	Oldsmobile
04	Bill Meacham	Meacham Racing	Oldsmobile
5	Ricky Rudd	Hendrick Motorsports	Chevrolet
6	Mark Martin	Roush Racing	Ford
06	Terry Byers	Byers Racing	Pontiac
7	Alan Kulwicki	AK Racing	Ford
8	Bobby Hillin Jr.	Stavola Brothers Racing	Buick
9	Bill Elliott	Melling Racing	Ford
10	Derrike Cope	Whitcomb Racing	Chevrolet
11	Geoff Bodine	Junior Johnson & Associates	Ford
12	Hut Stricklin	Bobby Allison Motorsports	Buick
13	Mike Potter	Mansion Motorsports	Pontiac
15	Morgan Shepherd	Bud Moore Engineering	Ford
17	Darrell Waltrip	Hendrick Motorsports	Chevrolet
18	Greg Sacks	Hendrick Motorsports	Chevrolet
19	Chad Little	Little Racing	Ford
20	Rob Moroso (R)	Moroso Racing	Oldsmobile
21	Dale Jarrett	Wood Brothers Racing	Ford
23	Eddie Bierschwale	B&B Racing	Oldsmobile
25	Ken Schrader	Hendrick Motorsports	Chevrolet
26	Brett Bodine	King Racing	Buick
27	Rusty Wallace	Blue Max Racing	Pontiac
28	Davey Allison	Robert Yates Racing	Ford
29	Phil Parsons	Diamond Ridge Motorsports	Pontiac
30	Michael Waltrip	Bahari Racing	Pontiac
33	Harry Gant	Leo Jackson Motorsports	Oldsmobile
35	Bill Venturini	Venturini Motorsports	Chevrolet
36	H. B. Bailey	Bailey Racing	Pontiac
38	Dick Johnson	Dick Johnson Racing	Ford
42	Kyle Petty	SABCO Racing	Pontiac
43	Richard Petty	Petty Enterprises	Pontiac
47	Jack Pennington (R)	Close Racing	Oldsmobile
52	Jimmy Means	Jimmy Means Racing	Pontiac
53	Jerry O'Neil (R)	Aroneck Racing	Oldsmobile
56	Ron Esau	Reno Enterprises	Chevrolet
57	Jimmy Spencer	Osterlund Racing	Pontiac
60	Robin Best	Best Racing	Chevrolet
66	Dick Trickle	Cale Yarborough Motorsports	Pontiac
70	J. D. McDuffie	McDuffie Racing	Pontiac
71	Dave Marcis	Marcis Auto Racing	Chevrolet
72	Tracy Leslie	Leslie Racing	Oldsmobile
75	Rick Wilson	RahMoc Enterprises	Oldsmobile
77	Ken Ragan	Ragan Racing	Ford
80	Jimmy Horton	S&H Racing	Ford
83	Lake Speed	Speed Racing	Oldsmobile
88	Larry Pearson	Edwards Racing	Pontiac
89	Rodney Combs	Mueller Brothers Racing	Pontiac
90	Buddy Baker	Donlavey Racing	Ford
94	Sterling Marlin	Hagan Racing	Oldsmobile
98	Butch Miller	Travis Carter Enterprises	Chevrolet

== Qualifying ==
Qualifying was split into two rounds. The first round was held on Wednesday, May 23, at 3:00 PM EST. Each driver would have one lap to set a time. During the first round, the top 20 drivers in the round would be guaranteed a starting spot in the race. If a driver was not able to guarantee a spot in the first round, they had the option to scrub their time from the first round and try and run a faster lap time in a second round qualifying run, held on Thursday, May 24, at 2:00 PM EST. As with the first round, each driver would have one lap to set a time. For this specific race, positions 21-40 would be decided on time, and depending on who needed it, a select amount of positions were given to cars who had not otherwise qualified but were high enough in owner's points; up to two were given.

Ken Schrader, driving for Hendrick Motorsports, would win the pole, setting a time of 31.041 and an average speed of 173.963 miles per hour (279.966 km/h) in the first round.

13 drivers would fail to qualify.

=== Full qualifying results ===
Pos.	#	Driver	Team	Make	Time	Speed
1	25	Ken Schrader	Hendrick Motorsports	Chevrolet	31.041	173.963
2	6	Mark Martin	Roush Racing	Ford	31.174	173.221
3	7	Alan Kulwicki	AK Racing	Ford	31.193	173.116
4	4	Ernie Irvan	Morgan–McClure Motorsports	Oldsmobile	31.222	172.955
5	26	Brett Bodine	King Racing	Buick	31.281	172.629
6	28	Davey Allison	Robert Yates Racing	Ford	31.368	172.150
7	9	Bill Elliott	Melling Racing	Ford	31.407	171.936
8	68	Bobby Hamilton	Diamond Ridge Motorsports	Pontiac	31.423	171.849
9	27	Rusty Wallace	Blue Max Racing	Pontiac	31.430	171.810
10	20	Rob Moroso (R)	Moroso Racing	Oldsmobile	31.458	171.657
11	10	Derrike Cope	Whitcomb Racing	Chevrolet	31.464	171.625
12	3	Dale Earnhardt	Richard Childress Racing	Chevrolet	31.502	171.418
13	11	Geoff Bodine	Junior Johnson & Associates	Ford	31.513	171.358
14	66	Dick Trickle	Cale Yarborough Motorsports	Pontiac	31.543	171.195
15	33	Harry Gant	Leo Jackson Motorsports	Oldsmobile	31.559	171.108
16	17	Darrell Waltrip	Hendrick Motorsports	Chevrolet	31.617	170.794
17	8	Bobby Hillin Jr.	Stavola Brothers Racing	Buick	31.622	170.767
18	98	Butch Miller	Travis Carter Enterprises	Chevrolet	31.652	170.605
19	21	Dale Jarrett	Wood Brothers Racing	Ford	31.653	170.600
20	30	Michael Waltrip	Bahari Racing	Pontiac	31.673	170.492
Failed to lock in Round 1
21	75	Rick Wilson	RahMoc Enterprises	Oldsmobile	31.676	170.476
22	94	Sterling Marlin	Hagan Racing	Oldsmobile	31.700	170.347
23	12	Hut Stricklin	Bobby Allison Motorsports	Buick	31.709	170.299
24	15	Morgan Shepherd	Bud Moore Engineering	Ford	31.752	170.068
25	19	Chad Little	Little Racing	Ford	31.771	169.966
26	57	Jimmy Spencer	Osterlund Racing	Pontiac	31.795	169.838
27	90	Buddy Baker	Donlavey Racing	Ford	31.797	169.827
28	18	Greg Sacks	Hendrick Motorsports	Chevrolet	31.803	169.795
29	88	Larry Pearson	Edwards Racing	Pontiac	31.812	169.747
30	43	Richard Petty	Petty Enterprises	Pontiac	31.819	169.710
31	06	Terry Byers	Byers Racing	Pontiac	31.854	169.523
32	77	Ken Ragan	Ragan Racing	Ford	31.893	169.316
33	80	Jimmy Horton	S&H Racing	Ford	31.895	169.306
34	5	Ricky Rudd	Hendrick Motorsports	Chevrolet	31.904	169.258
35	71	Dave Marcis	Marcis Auto Racing	Chevrolet	31.921	169.168
36	2	Rick Mast	U.S. Racing	Pontiac	31.926	169.141
37	47	Jack Pennington (R)	Close Racing	Oldsmobile	31.929	169.125
38	83	Lake Speed	Speed Racing	Oldsmobile	31.940	169.067
39	89	Rodney Combs	Mueller Brothers Racing	Pontiac	31.962	168.951
40	72	Tracy Leslie	Leslie Racing	Oldsmobile	31.979	168.861
Provisionals
41	42	Kyle Petty	SABCO Racing	Pontiac	32.286	167.255
42	1	Terry Labonte	Precision Products Racing	Oldsmobile	32.286	167.255
Failed to qualify
43	52	Jimmy Means	Jimmy Means Racing	Pontiac	-*	-*
44	70	J. D. McDuffie	McDuffie Racing	Pontiac	-*	-*
45	38	Dick Johnson	Dick Johnson Racing	Ford	-*	-*
46	13	Mike Potter	Mansion Motorsports	Pontiac	-*	-*
47	53	Jerry O'Neil (R)	Aroneck Racing	Oldsmobile	-*	-*
48	36	H. B. Bailey	Bailey Racing	Pontiac	-*	-*
49	23	Eddie Bierschwale	B&B Racing	Oldsmobile	-*	-*
50	04	Bill Meacham	Meacham Racing	Oldsmobile	-*	-*
51	56	Ron Esau	Reno Enterprises	Chevrolet	-*	-*
52	35	Bill Venturini	Venturini Motorsports	Chevrolet	-*	-*
53	60	Robin Best	Best Racing	Chevrolet	-*	-*
54	01	Mickey Gibbs	Gibbs Racing	Ford	-*	-*
55	29	Phil Parsons	Diamond Ridge Motorsports	Pontiac	-*	-*
Official first round qualifying results
Official starting lineup

== Race results ==
Fin	St	#	Driver	Team	Make	Laps	Led	Status	Pts	Winnings
1	9	27	Rusty Wallace	Blue Max Racing	Pontiac	400	306	running	185	$151,000
2	7	9	Bill Elliott	Melling Racing	Ford	400	0	running	170	$67,450
3	2	6	Mark Martin	Roush Racing	Ford	400	12	running	170	$51,700
4	20	30	Michael Waltrip	Bahari Racing	Pontiac	400	0	running	160	$32,600
5	4	4	Ernie Irvan	Morgan–McClure Motorsports	Oldsmobile	400	0	running	155	$28,350
6	3	7	Alan Kulwicki	AK Racing	Ford	400	0	running	150	$23,775
7	6	28	Davey Allison	Robert Yates Racing	Ford	400	1	running	151	$24,400
8	24	15	Morgan Shepherd	Bud Moore Engineering	Ford	400	0	running	142	$18,100
9	11	10	Derrike Cope	Whitcomb Racing	Chevrolet	400	2	running	143	$18,750
10	13	11	Geoff Bodine	Junior Johnson & Associates	Ford	400	5	running	139	$23,125
11	1	25	Ken Schrader	Hendrick Motorsports	Chevrolet	400	63	running	135	$63,100
12	14	66	Dick Trickle	Cale Yarborough Motorsports	Pontiac	399	0	running	127	$15,000
13	42	1	Terry Labonte	Precision Products Racing	Oldsmobile	399	0	running	124	$14,257
14	28	18	Greg Sacks	Hendrick Motorsports	Chevrolet	398	0	running	121	$8,668
15	27	90	Buddy Baker	Donlavey Racing	Ford	398	0	running	118	$10,465
16	35	71	Dave Marcis	Marcis Auto Racing	Chevrolet	398	0	running	115	$10,850
17	41	42	Kyle Petty	SABCO Racing	Pontiac	397	0	running	112	$13,900
18	18	98	Butch Miller	Travis Carter Enterprises	Chevrolet	396	0	running	109	$7,890
19	21	75	Rick Wilson	RahMoc Enterprises	Oldsmobile	395	0	engine	106	$9,370
20	37	47	Jack Pennington (R)	Close Racing	Oldsmobile	395	0	running	103	$7,775
21	26	57	Jimmy Spencer	Osterlund Racing	Pontiac	394	0	running	100	$8,800
22	16	17	Darrell Waltrip	Hendrick Motorsports	Chevrolet	393	2	running	102	$14,800
23	33	80	Jimmy Horton	S&H Racing	Ford	389	0	running	94	$5,400
24	25	19	Chad Little	Little Racing	Ford	385	0	running	91	$5,200
25	15	33	Harry Gant	Leo Jackson Motorsports	Oldsmobile	383	1	running	93	$12,100
26	10	20	Rob Moroso (R)	Moroso Racing	Oldsmobile	356	0	engine	85	$5,600
27	30	43	Richard Petty	Petty Enterprises	Pontiac	352	0	oil leak	82	$5,650
28	34	5	Ricky Rudd	Hendrick Motorsports	Chevrolet	320	0	camshaft	79	$7,450
29	5	26	Brett Bodine	King Racing	Buick	317	4	engine	81	$8,950
30	12	3	Dale Earnhardt	Richard Childress Racing	Chevrolet	262	0	running	73	$13,950
31	36	2	Rick Mast	U.S. Racing	Pontiac	251	0	engine	70	$7,000
32	19	21	Dale Jarrett	Wood Brothers Racing	Ford	241	4	engine	72	$7,120
33	39	89	Rodney Combs	Mueller Brothers Racing	Pontiac	226	0	engine	64	$4,190
34	17	8	Bobby Hillin Jr.	Stavola Brothers Racing	Buick	208	0	accident	61	$6,800
35	22	94	Sterling Marlin	Hagan Racing	Oldsmobile	201	0	engine	58	$6,750
36	40	72	Tracy Leslie	Leslie Racing	Oldsmobile	195	0	engine	55	$4,100
37	23	12	Hut Stricklin	Bobby Allison Motorsports	Buick	173	0	oil line	52	$4,680
38	38	83	Lake Speed	Speed Racing	Oldsmobile	113	0	accident	49	$4,060
39	8	68	Bobby Hamilton	Diamond Ridge Motorsports	Pontiac	102	0	accident	46	$4,540
40	31	06	Terry Byers	Byers Racing	Pontiac	40	0	engine	0	$4,020
41	32	77	Ken Ragan	Ragan Racing	Ford	5	0	engine	40	$4,520
42	29	88	Larry Pearson	Edwards Racing	Pontiac	2	0	engine	37	$4,520
Official race results

== Standings after the race ==
Drivers' Championship standings

	Pos	Driver	Points
	1	Dale Earnhardt	1,533
	2	Morgan Shepherd	1,512 (-21)
	3	Mark Martin	1,465 (-68)
1	4	Geoff Bodine	1,366 (–167)
2	5	Rusty Wallace	1,359 (–174)
1	6	Darrell Waltrip	1,347 (–186)
1	7	Kyle Petty	1,336 (–197)
2	8	Bill Elliott	1,299 (–234)
	9	Ken Schrader	1,271 (–262)
2	10	Brett Bodine	1,236 (–297)
Official driver's standings

- Note: Only the first 10 positions are included for the driver standings.

Previous race: 1990 Winston 500	NASCAR Winston Cup Series; 1990 season	Next race: 1990 Budweiser 500
