= 1990 Winston 500 =

Ninth race of the 1990 NASCAR Winston Cup Series

Race details
- Race 9 of 29 in the 1990 NASCAR Winston Cup Series
- The 1990 Winston 500 program cover, featuring Davey Allison.
- Date: May 6, 1990
- Official name: 21st Annual Winston 500
- Location: Lincoln, Alabama, Talladega Superspeedway
- Course: Permanent racing facility
- Course length: 2.66 miles (4.28 km)
- Distance: 188 laps, 500.08 mi (804.8 km)
- Scheduled distance: 188 laps, 500.08 mi (804.8 km)
- Average speed: 159.571 miles per hour (256.805 km/h)
- Attendance: 140,000

Pole position
Driver	Bill Elliott	Melling Racing
- Time: 48.027

Most laps led
Driver	Dale Earnhardt	Richard Childress Racing
- Laps: 107

Winner
No. 3	Dale Earnhardt	Richard Childress Racing

Television in the United States
- Network: ESPN
- Announcers: Bob Jenkins, Ned Jarrett, Benny Parsons

Radio in the United States
- Radio: Motor Racing Network

The 1990 Winston 500 was the ninth stock car race of the 1990 NASCAR Winston Cup Series season and the 21st iteration of the event. The race was held on Sunday, May 6, 1990, before an audience of 140,000 in Lincoln, Alabama at Talladega Superspeedway, a 2.66 miles (4.28 km) permanent triangle-shaped superspeedway. The race took the scheduled 188 laps to complete. In the final laps of the race, Richard Childress Racing driver Dale Earnhardt was able to fend off part-time driver for Hendrick Motorsports, Greg Sacks to take his 42nd career NASCAR Winston Cup Series victory and his third victory of the season. To fill out the top three, the aforementioned Greg Sacks and Roush Racing driver Mark Martin would finish second and third, respectively.

== Background ==
The layout of Talladega Superspeedway, the venue where the race was held.

Talladega Superspeedway, originally known as Alabama International Motor Superspeedway (AIMS), is a motorsports complex located north of Talladega, Alabama. It is located on the former Anniston Air Force Base in the small city of Lincoln. The track is a tri-oval and was constructed in the 1960s by the International Speedway Corporation, a business controlled by the France family. Talladega is most known for its steep banking and the unique location of the start/finish line that's located just past the exit to pit road. The track currently hosts the NASCAR series such as the NASCAR Cup Series, Xfinity Series and the Camping World Truck Series. Talladega is the longest NASCAR oval, a 2.66-mile-long (4.28 km) tri-oval like the Daytona International Speedway, which also is a 2.5-mile-long (4.0 km) tri-oval.

=== Entry list ===
- (R) denotes rookie driver.

#	Driver	Team	Make
1	Terry Labonte	Precision Products Racing	Oldsmobile
01	Mickey Gibbs	Gibbs Racing	Ford
2	Rick Mast	U.S. Racing	Pontiac
3	Dale Earnhardt	Richard Childress Racing	Chevrolet
4	Ernie Irvan	Morgan–McClure Motorsports	Oldsmobile
5	Ricky Rudd	Hendrick Motorsports	Chevrolet
6	Mark Martin	Roush Racing	Ford
7	Alan Kulwicki	AK Racing	Ford
8	Bobby Hillin Jr.	Stavola Brothers Racing	Buick
9	Bill Elliott	Melling Racing	Ford
10	Derrike Cope	Whitcomb Racing	Chevrolet
11	Geoff Bodine	Junior Johnson & Associates	Ford
12	Hut Stricklin	Bobby Allison Motorsports	Buick
15	Morgan Shepherd	Bud Moore Engineering	Ford
17	Darrell Waltrip	Hendrick Motorsports	Chevrolet
18	Greg Sacks	Hendrick Motorsports	Chevrolet
19	Chad Little	Little Racing	Ford
20	Rob Moroso (R)	Moroso Racing	Oldsmobile
21	Dale Jarrett	Wood Brothers Racing	Ford
25	Ken Schrader	Hendrick Motorsports	Chevrolet
26	Brett Bodine	King Racing	Buick
27	Rusty Wallace	Blue Max Racing	Pontiac
28	Davey Allison	Robert Yates Racing	Ford
30	Michael Waltrip	Bahari Racing	Pontiac
33	Harry Gant	Leo Jackson Motorsports	Oldsmobile
35	Bill Venturini	Venturini Motorsports	Chevrolet
42	Kyle Petty	SABCO Racing	Pontiac
43	Richard Petty	Petty Enterprises	Pontiac
47	Jack Pennington (R)	Close Racing	Oldsmobile
52	Jimmy Means	Jimmy Means Racing	Pontiac
57	Jimmy Spencer	Osterlund Racing	Pontiac
66	Dick Trickle	Cale Yarborough Motorsports	Pontiac
70	J. D. McDuffie	McDuffie Racing	Pontiac
71	Dave Marcis	Marcis Auto Racing	Chevrolet
72	Phil Parsons	Barkdoll Racing	Oldsmobile
73	Phil Barkdoll	Barkdoll Racing	Oldsmobile
75	Rick Wilson	RahMoc Enterprises	Oldsmobile
80	Jimmy Horton	S&H Racing	Ford
82	Mark Stahl	Stahl Racing	Ford
83	Lake Speed	Speed Racing	Oldsmobile
85	Bobby Gerhart	Bobby Gerhart Racing	Chevrolet
90	Buddy Baker	Donlavey Racing	Ford
94	Sterling Marlin	Hagan Racing	Oldsmobile
98	Butch Miller	Travis Carter Enterprises	Chevrolet

== Qualifying ==
Qualifying was split into two rounds. The first round was held on Thursday, May 3, at 4:30 PM EST. Each driver would have one lap to set a time. During the first round, the top 20 drivers in the round would be guaranteed a starting spot in the race. If a driver was not able to guarantee a spot in the first round, they had the option to scrub their time from the first round and try and run a faster lap time in a second round qualifying run, held on Friday, May 4, at 3:30 PM EST. As with the first round, each driver would have one lap to set a time. For this specific race, positions 21-40 would be decided on time, and depending on who needed it, a select amount of positions were given to cars who had not otherwise qualified but were high enough in owner's points; up to two were given.

Bill Elliott, driving for Melling Racing, would win the pole, setting a time of 48.027 and an average speed of 199.388 miles per hour (320.884 km/h) in the first round.

Four drivers would fail to qualify: J. D. McDuffie, Bobby Gerhart, Jimmy Horton and Mark Stahl

=== Full qualifying results ===
Pos.	#	Driver	Team	Make	Time	Speed
1	9	Bill Elliott	Melling Racing	Ford	48.027	199.388
2	25	Ken Schrader	Hendrick Motorsports	Chevrolet	48.089	199.131
3	17	Darrell Waltrip	Hendrick Motorsports	Chevrolet	48.115	199.023
4	4	Ernie Irvan	Morgan–McClure Motorsports	Oldsmobile	48.138	198.928
5	3	Dale Earnhardt	Richard Childress Racing	Chevrolet	48.168	198.804
6	6	Mark Martin	Roush Racing	Ford	48.183	198.742
7	7	Alan Kulwicki	AK Racing	Ford	48.542	197.277
8	28	Davey Allison	Robert Yates Racing	Ford	48.561	197.195
9	33	Harry Gant	Leo Jackson Motorsports	Oldsmobile	48.606	197.013
10	30	Michael Waltrip	Bahari Racing	Pontiac	48.665	196.774
11	42	Kyle Petty	SABCO Racing	Pontiac	48.677	196.725
12	57	Jimmy Spencer	Osterlund Racing	Pontiac	48.731	196.507
13	20	Rob Moroso (R)	Moroso Racing	Oldsmobile	48.747	196.443
14	5	Ricky Rudd	Hendrick Motorsports	Chevrolet	48.755	196.411
15	94	Sterling Marlin	Hagan Racing	Oldsmobile	48.758	196.399
16	21	Dale Jarrett	Wood Brothers Racing	Ford	48.791	196.266
17	18	Greg Sacks	Hendrick Motorsports	Chevrolet	48.940	195.668
18	12	Hut Stricklin	Bobby Allison Motorsports	Buick	48.964	195.572
19	75	Rick Wilson	RahMoc Enterprises	Oldsmobile	49.051	195.225
20	52	Jimmy Means	Jimmy Means Racing	Pontiac	49.107	195.003
Failed to lock in Round 1
21	15	Morgan Shepherd	Bud Moore Engineering	Ford	49.072	195.142
22	27	Rusty Wallace	Blue Max Racing	Pontiac	49.135	194.892
23	11	Geoff Bodine	Junior Johnson & Associates	Ford	49.142	194.864
24	26	Brett Bodine	King Racing	Buick	49.147	194.844
25	66	Dick Trickle	Cale Yarborough Motorsports	Pontiac	49.174	194.737
26	72	Phil Parsons	Barkdoll Racing	Oldsmobile	49.216	194.571
27	10	Derrike Cope	Whitcomb Racing	Chevrolet	49.277	194.330
28	83	Lake Speed	Speed Racing	Oldsmobile	49.314	194.184
29	71	Dave Marcis	Marcis Auto Racing	Chevrolet	49.391	193.881
30	90	Buddy Baker	Donlavey Racing	Ford	49.461	193.607
31	1	Terry Labonte	Precision Products Racing	Oldsmobile	49.523	193.365
32	47	Jack Pennington (R)	Close Racing	Oldsmobile	49.524	193.361
33	8	Bobby Hillin Jr.	Stavola Brothers Racing	Buick	49.572	193.174
34	2	Rick Mast	U.S. Racing	Pontiac	49.591	193.100
35	35	Bill Venturini	Venturini Motorsports	Chevrolet	49.607	193.037
36	73	Phil Barkdoll	Barkdoll Racing	Oldsmobile	49.670	192.792
37	98	Butch Miller	Travis Carter Enterprises	Chevrolet	49.672	192.785
38	19	Chad Little	Little Racing	Ford	49.714	192.622
39	43	Richard Petty	Petty Enterprises	Pontiac	49.724	192.583
40	01	Mickey Gibbs	Gibbs Racing	Ford	50.066	191.268
Failed to qualify
41	70	J. D. McDuffie	McDuffie Racing	Pontiac	-*	-*
42	85	Bobby Gerhart	Bobby Gerhart Racing	Chevrolet	-*	-*
43	80	Jimmy Horton	S&H Racing	Ford	-*	-*
44	82	Mark Stahl	Stahl Racing	Ford	-*	-*
Official first round qualifying results
Official starting lineup

== Race results ==
Fin	St	#	Driver	Team	Make	Laps	Led	Status	Pts	Winnings
1	5	3	Dale Earnhardt	Richard Childress Racing	Chevrolet	188	107	running	185	$98,975
2	17	18	Greg Sacks	Hendrick Motorsports	Chevrolet	188	41	running	175	$46,900
3	6	6	Mark Martin	Roush Racing	Ford	188	4	running	170	$39,050
4	4	4	Ernie Irvan	Morgan–McClure Motorsports	Oldsmobile	188	1	running	165	$30,150
5	10	30	Michael Waltrip	Bahari Racing	Pontiac	188	2	running	160	$26,425
6	31	1	Terry Labonte	Precision Products Racing	Oldsmobile	188	1	running	155	$20,657
7	11	42	Kyle Petty	SABCO Racing	Pontiac	187	1	running	151	$20,950
8	21	15	Morgan Shepherd	Bud Moore Engineering	Ford	187	5	running	147	$17,200
9	18	12	Hut Stricklin	Bobby Allison Motorsports	Buick	187	0	running	138	$13,400
10	3	17	Darrell Waltrip	Hendrick Motorsports	Chevrolet	187	3	running	139	$24,725
11	32	47	Jack Pennington (R)	Close Racing	Oldsmobile	187	0	running	130	$9,870
12	24	26	Brett Bodine	King Racing	Buick	187	0	running	127	$12,540
13	7	7	Alan Kulwicki	AK Racing	Ford	186	0	running	124	$12,010
14	29	71	Dave Marcis	Marcis Auto Racing	Chevrolet	186	0	running	121	$11,405
15	38	19	Chad Little	Little Racing	Ford	186	0	running	118	$7,975
16	37	98	Butch Miller	Travis Carter Enterprises	Chevrolet	186	0	running	115	$8,510
17	34	2	Rick Mast	U.S. Racing	Pontiac	186	0	running	112	$9,570
18	35	35	Bill Venturini	Venturini Motorsports	Chevrolet	183	0	running	109	$6,255
19	40	01	Mickey Gibbs	Gibbs Racing	Ford	183	0	running	106	$6,040
20	22	27	Rusty Wallace	Blue Max Racing	Pontiac	183	0	running	103	$17,575
21	20	52	Jimmy Means	Jimmy Means Racing	Pontiac	181	0	running	100	$6,565
22	1	9	Bill Elliott	Melling Racing	Ford	175	0	running	97	$16,570
23	33	8	Bobby Hillin Jr.	Stavola Brothers Racing	Buick	171	0	running	94	$8,310
24	23	11	Geoff Bodine	Junior Johnson & Associates	Ford	170	2	running	96	$13,655
25	8	28	Davey Allison	Robert Yates Racing	Ford	162	0	running	88	$13,275
26	15	94	Sterling Marlin	Hagan Racing	Oldsmobile	159	0	engine	85	$7,945
27	25	66	Dick Trickle	Cale Yarborough Motorsports	Pontiac	158	0	running	82	$8,790
28	2	25	Ken Schrader	Hendrick Motorsports	Chevrolet	154	20	valve	84	$13,735
29	39	43	Richard Petty	Petty Enterprises	Pontiac	137	0	running	76	$5,630
30	36	73	Phil Barkdoll	Barkdoll Racing	Oldsmobile	121	0	clutch	73	$4,875
31	30	90	Buddy Baker	Donlavey Racing	Ford	115	1	handling	75	$5,420
32	12	57	Jimmy Spencer	Osterlund Racing	Pontiac	114	0	engine	67	$7,340
33	14	5	Ricky Rudd	Hendrick Motorsports	Chevrolet	104	0	accident	64	$7,285
34	16	21	Dale Jarrett	Wood Brothers Racing	Ford	103	0	accident	61	$7,230
35	26	72	Phil Parsons	Barkdoll Racing	Oldsmobile	101	0	accident	58	$4,600
36	9	33	Harry Gant	Leo Jackson Motorsports	Oldsmobile	83	0	engine	55	$11,570
37	13	20	Rob Moroso (R)	Moroso Racing	Oldsmobile	79	0	piston	52	$4,740
38	28	83	Lake Speed	Speed Racing	Oldsmobile	41	0	engine	49	$4,435
39	19	75	Rick Wilson	RahMoc Enterprises	Oldsmobile	9	0	engine	46	$6,380
40	27	10	Derrike Cope	Whitcomb Racing	Chevrolet	3	0	engine	43	$9,350
Official race results

== Standings after the race ==
Drivers' Championship standings

	Pos	Driver	Points
	1	Dale Earnhardt	1,460
	2	Morgan Shepherd	1,370 (-90)
1	3	Mark Martin	1,295 (-165)
1	4	Darrell Waltrip	1,245 (–215)
2	5	Geoff Bodine	1,227 (–233)
	6	Kyle Petty	1,224 (–236)
	7	Rusty Wallace	1,174 (–286)
2	8	Brett Bodine	1,155 (–305)
1	9	Ken Schrader	1,136 (–324)
1	10	Bill Elliott	1,129 (–331)
Official driver's standings

- Note: Only the first 10 positions are included for the driver standings.

Previous race: 1990 Hanes Activewear 500	NASCAR Winston Cup Series; 1990 season	Next race: 1990 Coca-Cola 600
