= 1987 Goodwrench 500 =

Second race of the 1987 NASCAR Winston Cup Series

Race details
- Race 2 of 29 in the 1987 NASCAR Winston Cup Series
- The 1987 GM Goodwrench 500 program cover, featuring Dale Earnhardt and Terry Labonte.
- Date: March 1, 1987
- Official name: 22nd Annual Goodwrench 500
- Location: Rockingham, North Carolina, North Carolina Motor Speedway
- Course: Permanent racing facility
- Course length: 1.017 miles (1.637 km)
- Distance: 492 laps, 500.364 mi (805.257 km)
- Scheduled distance: 492 laps, 500.364 mi (805.257 km)
- Average speed: 117.556 miles per hour (189.188 km/h)
- Attendance: 38,500

Pole position
Driver	Davey Allison	Ranier-Lundy Racing
- Time: 24.908

Most laps led
Driver	Dale Earnhardt	Richard Childress Racing
- Laps: 319

Winner
No. 3	Dale Earnhardt	RahMoc Enterprises

Television in the United States
- Network: SETN
- Announcers: Eli Gold, Jerry Punch

Radio in the United States
- Radio: Motor Racing Network

The 1987 Goodwrench 500 was the second stock car race of the 1987 NASCAR Winston Cup Series season and the 22nd iteration of the event. The race was held on Sunday, March 1, 1987, before an audience of 38,500 in Rockingham, North Carolina, at North Carolina Motor Speedway, a 1.017 miles (1.637 km) permanent high-banked racetrack. The race took the scheduled 492 laps to complete.

At race's end, Richard Childress Racing's Dale Earnhardt, with assistance from crew chief Kirk Shelmerdine and his pit crew, managed to dominate the majority of the race, leading 319 laps. By the finish, Earnhardt had gained a 10.5 second lead over second place, gaining his 21st career NASCAR Winston Cup Series victory and his first victory of the season. To fill out the top three, Bud Moore Engineering's Ricky Rudd and RahMoc Enterprises' Neil Bonnett finished second and third, respectively.

== Background ==
The layout of North Carolina Motor Speedway, the venue where the race was held.

North Carolina Motor Speedway was opened as a flat, one-mile oval on October 31, 1965. In 1969, the track was extensively reconfigured to a high-banked, D-shaped oval just over one mile in length. In 1997, North Carolina Motor Speedway merged with Penske Motorsports, and was renamed North Carolina Speedway. Shortly thereafter, the infield was reconfigured, and competition on the infield road course, mostly by the SCCA, was discontinued. Currently, the track is home to the Fast Track High Performance Driving School.

=== Entry list ===
- (R) denotes rookie driver.

#	Driver	Team	Make
1	Ron Bouchard	Ellington Racing	Chevrolet
3	Dale Earnhardt	Richard Childress Racing	Chevrolet
5	Geoff Bodine	Hendrick Motorsports	Chevrolet
6	D. K. Ulrich	U.S. Racing	Chevrolet
7	Alan Kulwicki	AK Racing	Ford
8	Bobby Hillin Jr.	Stavola Brothers Racing	Buick
9	Bill Elliott	Melling Racing	Ford
11	Terry Labonte	Junior Johnson & Associates	Chevrolet
12	David Sosebee	Hamby Racing	Chevrolet
15	Ricky Rudd	Bud Moore Engineering	Ford
17	Darrell Waltrip	Hendrick Motorsports	Chevrolet
18	Tommy Ellis	Freedlander Motorsports	Chevrolet
21	Kyle Petty	Wood Brothers Racing	Ford
22	Bobby Allison	Stavola Brothers Racing	Buick
26	Morgan Shepherd	King Racing	Buick
27	Rusty Wallace	Blue Max Racing	Pontiac
28	Davey Allison (R)	Ranier-Lundy Racing	Ford
29	Cale Yarborough	Cale Yarborough Motorsports	Oldsmobile
30	Michael Waltrip	Bahari Racing	Chevrolet
33	Harry Gant	Mach 1 Racing	Chevrolet
34	Jesse Samples Jr.	AAG Racing	Chevrolet
35	Benny Parsons	Hendrick Motorsports	Chevrolet
43	Richard Petty	Petty Enterprises	Pontiac
44	Sterling Marlin	Hagan Racing	Oldsmobile
48	James Hylton	Hylton Motorsports	Chevrolet
50	Greg Sacks	Dingman Brothers Racing	Pontiac
52	Jimmy Means	Jimmy Means Racing	Pontiac
55	Phil Parsons	Jackson Bros. Motorsports	Oldsmobile
64	Jerry Cranmer	Langley Racing	Ford
67	Eddie Bierschwale	Arrington Racing	Ford
68	Jerry Holden	Holden Racing	Chevrolet
70	J. D. McDuffie	McDuffie Racing	Pontiac
71	Dave Marcis	Marcis Auto Racing	Chevrolet
74	Bobby Wawak	Wawak Racing	Chevrolet
75	Neil Bonnett	RahMoc Enterprises	Pontiac
81	Chet Fillip	Fillip Racing	Ford
82	Mark Stahl	Stahl Racing	Ford
83	Lake Speed	Speed Racing	Oldsmobile
87	Patrick Latimer	Buck Baker Racing	Chevrolet
88	Buddy Baker	Baker–Schiff Racing	Oldsmobile
90	Ken Schrader	Donlavey Racing	Ford
93	Charlie Baker	Salmon Racing	Chevrolet

== Qualifying ==
Qualifying was originally scheduled to be split into two rounds. The first round was held on Thursday, February 26, at 2:30 pm EST. Originally, the first 20 positions were going to be determined by first round qualifying, with positions 21–40 meant to be determined the following day on Friday, February 27. However, due to rain, the second round was cancelled. As a result, the rest of the starting lineup was set using the results from the first round. Depending on who needed it, a select amount of positions were given to cars who had not otherwise qualified but were high enough in owner's points; up to two were given.

Davey Allison, driving for Ranier-Lundy Racing, managed to win the pole, setting a time of 24.908 and an average speed of 146.989 miles per hour (236.556 km/h).

No drivers failed to qualify.

=== Full qualifying results ===
Pos.	#	Driver	Team	Make	Time	Speed
1	28	Davey Allison (R)	Ranier-Lundy Racing	Ford	24.908	146.989
2	5	Geoff Bodine	Hendrick Motorsports	Chevrolet	24.988	146.518
3	90	Ken Schrader	Donlavey Racing	Ford	25.012	146.378
4	35	Benny Parsons	Hendrick Motorsports	Chevrolet	25.026	146.296
5	15	Ricky Rudd	Bud Moore Engineering	Ford	25.052	146.144
6	75	Neil Bonnett	RahMoc Enterprises	Pontiac	25.069	146.045
7	9	Bill Elliott	Melling Racing	Ford	25.139	145.638
8	17	Darrell Waltrip	Hendrick Motorsports	Chevrolet	25.218	145.182
9	11	Terry Labonte	Junior Johnson & Associates	Chevrolet	25.243	145.030
10	88	Buddy Baker	Baker–Schiff Racing	Oldsmobile	25.288	144.780
11	33	Harry Gant	Mach 1 Racing	Chevrolet	25.308	144.666
12	44	Sterling Marlin	Hagan Racing	Oldsmobile	25.311	144.649
13	43	Richard Petty	Petty Enterprises	Pontiac	25.333	144.523
14	3	Dale Earnhardt	Richard Childress Racing	Chevrolet	25.353	144.409
15	8	Bobby Hillin Jr.	Stavola Brothers Racing	Buick	25.376	144.278
16	26	Morgan Shepherd	King Racing	Buick	25.385	144.227
17	22	Bobby Allison	Stavola Brothers Racing	Buick	25.388	144.210
18	30	Michael Waltrip	Bahari Racing	Chevrolet	25.413	144.068
19	83	Lake Speed	Speed Racing	Oldsmobile	25.440	143.915
20	21	Kyle Petty	Wood Brothers Racing	Ford	25.445	143.887
21	55	Phil Parsons	Jackson Bros. Motorsports	Oldsmobile	25.448	143.870
22	18	Tommy Ellis	Freedlander Motorsports	Chevrolet	25.488	143.466
23	27	Rusty Wallace	Blue Max Racing	Pontiac	25.562	143.228
24	29	Cale Yarborough	Cale Yarborough Motorsports	Oldsmobile	25.578	143.139
25	50	Greg Sacks	Dingman Brothers Racing	Pontiac	25.589	143.077
26	52	Jimmy Means	Jimmy Means Racing	Pontiac	25.713	142.387
27	34	Jesse Samples Jr.	AAG Racing	Chevrolet	25.756	142.149
28	71	Dave Marcis	Marcis Auto Racing	Chevrolet	25.771	142.067
29	70	J. D. McDuffie	McDuffie Racing	Pontiac	26.025	140.680
30	81	Chet Fillip	Fillip Racing	Ford	26.089	140.335
31	1	Ron Bouchard	Ellington Racing	Chevrolet	26.322	139.039
32	67	Eddie Bierschwale	Arrington Racing	Ford	26.402	138.671
33	82	Mark Stahl	Stahl Racing	Ford	26.599	137.644
34	74	Bobby Wawak	Wawak Racing	Chevrolet	26.680	137.226
35	64	Jerry Cranmer	Langley Racing	Ford	26.730	136.970
36	12	David Sosebee	Hamby Racing	Chevrolet	26.919	136.008
37	93	Charlie Baker	Salmon Racing	Chevrolet	27.162	134.791
38	87	Patrick Latimer	Buck Baker Racing	Chevrolet	27.753	131.921
39	68	Jerry Holden	Holden Racing	Chevrolet	28.367	129.065
Qualified via current driver's points
40	7	Alan Kulwicki	AK Racing	Ford	–	–
Provisionals
41	6	D. K. Ulrich	U.S. Racing	Chevrolet	–	–
42	48	James Hylton	Hylton Motorsports	Chevrolet	–	–
Official starting lineup

== Race results ==
Fin	St	#	Driver	Team	Make	Laps	Led	Status	Pts	Winnings
1	14	3	Dale Earnhardt	Richard Childress Racing	Chevrolet	492	319	running	185	$53,900
2	5	15	Ricky Rudd	Bud Moore Engineering	Ford	492	70	running	175	$28,135
3	6	75	Neil Bonnett	RahMoc Enterprises	Pontiac	492	36	running	170	$17,875
4	7	9	Bill Elliott	Melling Racing	Ford	492	0	running	160	$17,405
5	16	26	Morgan Shepherd	King Racing	Buick	491	12	running	160	$12,010
6	23	27	Rusty Wallace	Blue Max Racing	Pontiac	491	0	running	150	$14,160
7	8	17	Darrell Waltrip	Hendrick Motorsports	Chevrolet	490	0	running	146	$5,060
8	9	11	Terry Labonte	Junior Johnson & Associates	Chevrolet	490	0	running	142	$13,510
9	1	28	Davey Allison (R)	Ranier-Lundy Racing	Ford	490	29	running	143	$8,260
10	3	90	Ken Schrader	Donlavey Racing	Ford	489	1	running	139	$10,035
11	21	55	Phil Parsons	Jackson Bros. Motorsports	Oldsmobile	488	0	running	130	$5,020
12	19	83	Lake Speed	Speed Racing	Oldsmobile	487	1	running	132	$3,820
13	17	22	Bobby Allison	Stavola Brothers Racing	Buick	487	0	running	124	$10,620
14	15	8	Bobby Hillin Jr.	Stavola Brothers Racing	Buick	486	0	running	121	$10,420
15	13	43	Richard Petty	Petty Enterprises	Pontiac	486	0	running	118	$8,175
16	20	21	Kyle Petty	Wood Brothers Racing	Ford	482	0	running	115	$7,025
17	18	30	Michael Waltrip	Bahari Racing	Chevrolet	479	0	running	112	$6,755
18	32	67	Eddie Bierschwale	Arrington Racing	Ford	477	0	running	109	$6,445
19	12	44	Sterling Marlin	Hagan Racing	Oldsmobile	476	0	running	106	$5,985
20	29	70	J. D. McDuffie	McDuffie Racing	Pontiac	474	0	running	103	$3,920
21	37	93	Charlie Baker	Salmon Racing	Chevrolet	463	0	running	100	$2,265
22	26	52	Jimmy Means	Jimmy Means Racing	Pontiac	461	0	running	97	$5,395
23	35	64	Jerry Cranmer	Langley Racing	Ford	461	0	running	94	$5,160
24	30	81	Chet Fillip	Fillip Racing	Ford	441	0	running	91	$2,040
25	40	7	Alan Kulwicki	AK Racing	Ford	440	0	running	88	$5,840
26	41	6	D. K. Ulrich	U.S. Racing	Chevrolet	435	0	running	85	$4,680
27	34	74	Bobby Wawak	Wawak Racing	Chevrolet	418	0	running	82	$1,865
28	24	29	Cale Yarborough	Cale Yarborough Motorsports	Oldsmobile	339	0	transmission	79	$1,815
29	11	33	Harry Gant	Mach 1 Racing	Chevrolet	335	0	engine	76	$4,495
30	25	50	Greg Sacks	Dingman Brothers Racing	Pontiac	319	0	crash	73	$1,690
31	10	88	Buddy Baker	Baker–Schiff Racing	Oldsmobile	243	1	engine	75	$1,600
32	2	5	Geoff Bodine	Hendrick Motorsports	Chevrolet	228	2	engine	72	$8,800
33	33	82	Mark Stahl	Stahl Racing	Ford	127	0	overheating	64	$1,480
34	4	35	Benny Parsons	Hendrick Motorsports	Chevrolet	79	21	engine	66	$10,630
35	28	71	Dave Marcis	Marcis Auto Racing	Chevrolet	79	0	crash	58	$4,115
36	31	1	Ron Bouchard	Ellington Racing	Chevrolet	79	0	crash	55	$1,350
37	42	48	James Hylton	Hylton Motorsports	Chevrolet	79	0	crash	52	$1,325
38	22	18	Tommy Ellis	Freedlander Motorsports	Chevrolet	78	0	crash	49	$3,300
39	36	12	David Sosebee	Hamby Racing	Chevrolet	69	0	crash	46	$3,275
40	38	87	Patrick Latimer	Buck Baker Racing	Chevrolet	38	0	crash	43	$1,250
41	27	34	Jesse Samples Jr.	AAG Racing	Chevrolet	8	0	crash	40	$1,250
42	39	68	Jerry Holden	Holden Racing	Chevrolet	8	0	engine	37	$1,250
Official race results

== Standings after the race ==
Drivers' Championship standings

	Pos	Driver	Points
4	1	Dale Earnhardt	345
1	2	Bill Elliott	345 (−0)
6	3	Ricky Rudd	313 (−32)
7	4	Neil Bonnett	302 (−43)
3	5	Darrell Waltrip	293 (−52)
	6	Ken Schrader	290 (−55)
4	7	Richard Petty	288 (−57)
8	8	Morgan Shepherd	275 (−70)
2	9	Bobby Allison	274 (−71)
2	10	Phil Parsons	260 (−85)
Official driver's standings

- Note: Only the first 10 positions are included for the driver standings.

Previous race: 1987 Daytona 500	NASCAR Winston Cup Series; 1987 season	Next race: 1987 Miller High Life 400
