= 1987 Motorcraft Quality Parts 500 =

Fourth race of the 1987 NASCAR Winston Cup Series

Race details
- Race 4 of 29 in the 1987 NASCAR Winston Cup Series
- The 1987 Motorcraft Quality Parts 500 program cover, featuring Ricky Rudd.
- Date: March 15, 1987
- Official name: 28th Annual Motorcraft Quality Parts 500
- Location: Hampton, Georgia, Atlanta International Raceway
- Course: Permanent racing facility
- Course length: 1.522 miles (2.449 km)
- Distance: 328 laps, 499.216 mi (803.41 km)
- Scheduled distance: 328 laps, 499.216 mi (803.41 km)
- Average speed: 133.689 miles per hour (215.152 km/h)
- Attendance: 60,000

Pole position
Driver	Dale Earnhardt	Richard Childress Racing
- Time: 31.221

Most laps led
Driver	Dale Earnhardt	Richard Childress Racing
- Laps: 196

Winner
No. 15	Ricky Rudd	Bud Moore Engineering

Television in the United States
- Network: ABC
- Announcers: Jim Lampley, Sam Posey

Radio in the United States
- Radio: Motor Racing Network

The 1987 Motorcraft Quality Parts 500 was the fourth stock car race of the 1987 NASCAR Winston Cup Series season and the 28th iteration of the event. The race was held on Sunday, March 15, 1987, before an audience of 60,000 in Hampton, Georgia, at Atlanta International Raceway, a 1.522 miles (2.449 km) permanent asphalt quad-oval intermediate speedway.

After the dominant car of the day, Dale Earnhardt, suffered mechanical problems that put him out of contention for the race, a restart with eight laps left in the race left a four car battle for the victory. By race's end, Bud Moore Engineering's Ricky Rudd managed to pull away to take his seventh career NASCAR Winston Cup Series victory and his first victory of the season. To fill out the top three, Hendrick Motorsports' Benny Parsons and Blue Max Racing's Rusty Wallace finished second and third, respectively.

== Background ==
The layout of Atlanta International Raceway, the circuit where the race was held.

Atlanta Motor Speedway (formerly Atlanta International Raceway) is a 1.522-mile race track in Hampton, Georgia, United States, 20 miles (32 km) south of Atlanta. It has annually hosted NASCAR Winston Cup Series stock car races since its inauguration in 1960.

The venue was bought by Speedway Motorsports in 1990. In 1994, 46 condominiums were built over the northeastern side of the track. In 1997, to standardize the track with Speedway Motorsports' other two intermediate ovals, the entire track was almost completely rebuilt. The frontstretch and backstretch were swapped, and the configuration of the track was changed from oval to quad-oval, with a new official length of 1.54-mile (2.48 km) where before it was 1.522-mile (2.449 km). The project made the track one of the fastest on the NASCAR circuit.

=== Entry list ===
- (R) - denotes rookie driver.

#	Driver	Team	Make
1	Ron Bouchard	Ellington Racing	Chevrolet
3	Dale Earnhardt	Richard Childress Racing	Chevrolet
4	Rick Wilson	Morgan–McClure Motorsports	Oldsmobile
5	Geoff Bodine	Hendrick Motorsports	Chevrolet
6	D. K. Ulrich	U.S. Racing	Chevrolet
7	Alan Kulwicki	AK Racing	Ford
8	Bobby Hillin Jr.	Stavola Brothers Racing	Buick
9	Bill Elliott	Melling Racing	Ford
11	Terry Labonte	Junior Johnson & Associates	Chevrolet
12	David Sosebee	Hamby Racing	Chevrolet
14	A. J. Foyt	A. J. Foyt Racing	Oldsmobile
15	Ricky Rudd	Bud Moore Engineering	Ford
17	Darrell Waltrip	Hendrick Motorsports	Chevrolet
18	Tommy Ellis	Freedlander Motorsports	Chevrolet
19	Derrike Cope (R)	Stoke Racing	Ford
21	Kyle Petty	Wood Brothers Racing	Ford
22	Bobby Allison	Stavola Brothers Racing	Buick
26	Morgan Shepherd	King Racing	Buick
27	Rusty Wallace	Blue Max Racing	Pontiac
28	Davey Allison (R)	Ranier-Lundy Racing	Ford
29	Cale Yarborough	Cale Yarborough Motorsports	Oldsmobile
30	Michael Waltrip	Bahari Racing	Chevrolet
33	Harry Gant	Mach 1 Racing	Chevrolet
35	Benny Parsons	Hendrick Motorsports	Chevrolet
36	H. B. Bailey	Bailey Racing	Pontiac
43	Richard Petty	Petty Enterprises	Pontiac
44	Sterling Marlin	Hagan Racing	Oldsmobile
50	Greg Sacks	Dingman Brothers Racing	Pontiac
52	Jimmy Means	Jimmy Means Racing	Pontiac
55	Phil Parsons	Jackson Bros. Motorsports	Oldsmobile
62	Steve Christman (R)	Winkle Motorsports	Pontiac
64	Connie Saylor	Langley Racing	Ford
67	Eddie Bierschwale	Arrington Racing	Ford
68	Jerry Holden	Holden Racing	Chevrolet
70	J. D. McDuffie	McDuffie Racing	Pontiac
71	Dave Marcis	Marcis Auto Racing	Chevrolet
74	Bobby Wawak	Wawak Racing	Chevrolet
75	Neil Bonnett	RahMoc Enterprises	Pontiac
77	Ken Ragan	Ragan Racing	Ford
82	Mark Stahl	Stahl Racing	Ford
83	Lake Speed	Speed Racing	Oldsmobile
88	Buddy Baker	Baker–Schiff Racing	Oldsmobile
90	Ken Schrader	Donlavey Racing	Ford
93	Charlie Baker (Note: Baker was injured in the preliminary ARCA Permatex SuperCar Series race on Saturday. As he did qualify before then, Mike Potter replaced him for the race.)	Salmon Racing	Chevrolet

== Qualifying ==
Qualifying was split into two rounds. The first round was held on Friday, March 13, at 2:00 PM EST. Each driver would have one lap to set a time. During the first round, the top 20 drivers in the round would be guaranteed a starting spot in the race. If a driver was not able to guarantee a spot in the first round, they had the option to scrub their time from the first round and try and run a faster lap time in a second round qualifying run, held on Saturday, March 14, at 10:30 AM EST. As with the first round, each driver would have one lap to set a time. For this specific race, positions 21-40 would be decided on time, and depending on who needed it, a select amount of positions were given to cars who had not otherwise qualified but were high enough in owner's points; up to two were given.

Dale Earnhardt, driving for Richard Childress Racing, won the pole, setting a time of 31.221 and an average speed of 175.497 mph (282.435 km/h) in the first round.

Two drivers failed to qualify.

=== Full qualifying results ===
Pos.	#	Driver	Team	Make	Time	Speed
1	3	Dale Earnhardt	Richard Childress Racing	Chevrolet	31.221	175.497
2	9	Bill Elliott	Melling Racing	Ford	31.445	174.247
3	29	Cale Yarborough	Cale Yarborough Motorsports	Oldsmobile	31.481	174.048
4	90	Ken Schrader	Donlavey Racing	Ford	31.505	173.915
5	88	Buddy Baker	Baker–Schiff Racing	Oldsmobile	31.538	173.733
6	15	Ricky Rudd	Bud Moore Engineering	Ford	31.569	173.563
7	27	Rusty Wallace	Blue Max Racing	Pontiac	31.619	173.288
8	28	Davey Allison (R)	Ranier-Lundy Racing	Ford	31.657	173.080
9	11	Terry Labonte	Junior Johnson & Associates	Chevrolet	31.714	172.769
10	35	Benny Parsons	Hendrick Motorsports	Chevrolet	31.736	172.649
11	33	Harry Gant	Mach 1 Racing	Chevrolet	31.748	172.584
12	83	Lake Speed	Speed Racing	Oldsmobile	31.784	172.389
13	8	Bobby Hillin Jr.	Stavola Brothers Racing	Buick	31.784	172.389
14	5	Geoff Bodine	Hendrick Motorsports	Chevrolet	31.786	172.378
15	22	Bobby Allison	Stavola Brothers Racing	Buick	31.877	171.886
16	30	Michael Waltrip	Bahari Racing	Chevrolet	31.880	171.870
17	43	Richard Petty	Petty Enterprises	Pontiac	31.948	171.504
18	77	Ken Ragan	Ragan Racing	Ford	31.949	171.498
19	55	Phil Parsons	Jackson Bros. Motorsports	Oldsmobile	31.973	171.370
20	50	Greg Sacks	Dingman Brothers Racing	Pontiac	31.984	171.311
Failed to lock in Round 1
21	17	Darrell Waltrip	Hendrick Motorsports	Chevrolet	31.936	171.568
22	44	Sterling Marlin	Hagan Racing	Oldsmobile	31.999	171.230
23	7	Alan Kulwicki	AK Racing	Ford	32.041	171.006
24	14	A. J. Foyt	A. J. Foyt Racing	Oldsmobile	32.041	171.006
25	21	Kyle Petty	Wood Brothers Racing	Ford	32.056	170.926
26	75	Neil Bonnett	RahMoc Enterprises	Pontiac	32.112	170.628
27	4	Rick Wilson	Morgan–McClure Motorsports	Oldsmobile	32.118	170.596
28	67	Eddie Bierschwale	Arrington Racing	Ford	32.123	170.569
29	26	Morgan Shepherd	King Racing	Buick	32.126	170.553
30	18	Tommy Ellis	Freedlander Motorsports	Chevrolet	32.136	170.500
31	12	David Sosebee	Hamby Racing	Oldsmobile	32.266	169.813
32	1	Ron Bouchard	Ellington Racing	Chevrolet	32.284	169.719
33	52	Jimmy Means	Jimmy Means Racing	Pontiac	32.289	169.692
34	36	H. B. Bailey	Bailey Racing	Pontiac	32.417	169.022
35	62	Steve Christman (R)	Winkle Motorsports	Pontiac	32.421	169.002
36	71	Dave Marcis	Marcis Auto Racing	Chevrolet	32.440	168.903
37	64	Connie Saylor	Langley Racing	Ford	32.520	168.487
38	82	Mark Stahl	Stahl Racing	Ford	32.535	168.409
39	93	Mike Potter	Salmon Racing	Chevrolet	32.546	168.352
40	19	Derrike Cope (R)	Stoke Racing	Ford	32.551	168.327
Provisionals
41	70	J. D. McDuffie	McDuffie Racing	Pontiac	-*	-*
42	6	D. K. Ulrich	U.S. Racing	Chevrolet	-*	-*
Failed to qualify
43	74	Bobby Wawak	Wawak Racing	Chevrolet	-*	-*
44	68	Jerry Holden	Holden Racing	Chevrolet	-*	-*
Official first round qualifying results
Official starting lineup

== Race results ==
Fin	St	#	Driver	Team	Make	Laps	Led	Status	Pts	Winnings
1	6	15	Ricky Rudd	Bud Moore Engineering	Ford	328	7	running	180	$62,400
2	10	35	Benny Parsons	Hendrick Motorsports	Chevrolet	328	43	running	175	$36,125
3	7	27	Rusty Wallace	Blue Max Racing	Pontiac	328	26	running	170	$25,950
4	9	11	Terry Labonte	Junior Johnson & Associates	Chevrolet	328	2	running	165	$20,825
5	8	28	Davey Allison (R)	Ranier-Lundy Racing	Ford	327	0	running	155	$18,550
6	21	17	Darrell Waltrip	Hendrick Motorsports	Chevrolet	327	0	running	150	$9,900
7	26	75	Neil Bonnett	RahMoc Enterprises	Pontiac	327	0	running	146	$11,205
8	3	29	Cale Yarborough	Cale Yarborough Motorsports	Oldsmobile	327	7	running	147	$5,650
9	25	21	Kyle Petty	Wood Brothers Racing	Ford	327	0	running	138	$9,320
10	29	26	Morgan Shepherd	King Racing	Buick	326	0	running	134	$9,750
11	27	4	Rick Wilson	Morgan–McClure Motorsports	Oldsmobile	326	0	running	130	$8,470
12	32	1	Ron Bouchard	Ellington Racing	Chevrolet	325	0	running	127	$3,500
13	22	44	Sterling Marlin	Hagan Racing	Oldsmobile	325	0	running	124	$9,945
14	17	43	Richard Petty	Petty Enterprises	Pontiac	325	1	running	126	$7,215
15	14	5	Geoff Bodine	Hendrick Motorsports	Chevrolet	323	0	running	118	$1,480
16	1	3	Dale Earnhardt	Richard Childress Racing	Chevrolet	322	196	running	125	$19,520
17	30	18	Tommy Ellis	Freedlander Motorsports	Chevrolet	322	0	running	112	$8,745
18	34	36	H. B. Bailey	Bailey Racing	Pontiac	321	0	running	109	$4,550
19	15	22	Bobby Allison	Stavola Brothers Racing	Buick	320	2	running	111	$9,690
20	24	14	A. J. Foyt	A. J. Foyt Racing	Oldsmobile	319	0	running	103	$3,070
21	31	12	David Sosebee	Hamby Racing	Oldsmobile	317	0	running	100	$7,610
22	35	62	Steve Christman (R)	Winkle Motorsports	Pontiac	314	0	running	97	$3,600
23	42	6	D. K. Ulrich	U.S. Racing	Chevrolet	303	0	ball joint	94	$6,680
24	13	8	Bobby Hillin Jr.	Stavola Brothers Racing	Buick	302	0	running	91	$9,180
25	39	93	Mike Potter	Salmon Racing	Chevrolet	291	0	running	88	$2,945
26	18	77	Ken Ragan	Ragan Racing	Ford	281	0	ignition	85	$2,555
27	19	55	Phil Parsons	Jackson Bros. Motorsports	Oldsmobile	261	0	engine	82	$1,995
28	2	9	Bill Elliott	Melling Racing	Ford	255	22	engine	84	$10,560
29	4	90	Ken Schrader	Donlavey Racing	Ford	220	22	engine	81	$5,130
30	38	82	Mark Stahl	Stahl Racing	Ford	208	0	running	73	$1,840
31	36	71	Dave Marcis	Marcis Auto Racing	Chevrolet	169	0	handling	70	$4,855
32	33	52	Jimmy Means	Jimmy Means Racing	Pontiac	157	0	crash	67	$4,555
33	23	7	Alan Kulwicki	AK Racing	Ford	86	0	crash	64	$5,490
34	11	33	Harry Gant	Mach 1 Racing	Chevrolet	86	0	crash	61	$4,455
35	12	83	Lake Speed	Speed Racing	Oldsmobile	73	0	fuel pump	58	$1,680
36	40	19	Derrike Cope (R)	Stoke Racing	Ford	61	0	crash	55	$1,655
37	20	50	Greg Sacks	Dingman Brothers Racing	Pontiac	53	0	engine	52	$1,635
38	5	88	Buddy Baker	Baker–Schiff Racing	Oldsmobile	36	0	engine	49	$1,615
39	16	30	Michael Waltrip	Bahari Racing	Chevrolet	33	0	transmission	46	$4,325
40	41	70	J. D. McDuffie	McDuffie Racing	Pontiac	16	0	engine	43	$1,510
41	37	64	Connie Saylor	Langley Racing	Ford	3	0	engine	40	$3,510
42	28	67	Eddie Bierschwale	Arrington Racing	Ford	0	0	did not start	0	$0
Official race results

== Standings after the race ==
Drivers' Championship standings

	Pos	Driver	Points
	1	Dale Earnhardt	655
	2	Bill Elliott	594 (-61)
2	3	Terry Labonte	576 (-79)
4	4	Ricky Rudd	572 (–83)
1	5	Darrell Waltrip	551 (–104)
6	6	Benny Parsons	550 (–105)
	7	Neil Bonnett	545 (–110)
5	8	Bobby Allison	528 (–127)
6	9	Rusty Wallace	525 (–130)
1	10	Richard Petty	508 (–147)
Official driver's standings

- Note: Only the first 10 positions are included for the driver standings.

== Notes ==
Previous race: 1987 Miller High Life 400	NASCAR Winston Cup Series; 1987 season	Next race: 1987 TranSouth 500
