= Sosebee =

Sosebee is an English surname. Notable people with the surname include:

- David Sosebee (born 1955), American race car driver, son of Gober
- Gober Sosebee (1915–1996), American race car driver
