= 1988 NASCAR Christmas 500 =

NASCAR event in Melbourne, Australia

Race details
- Exhibition race in the 1988 NASCAR Winston Cup Series season Race 3 of 6 in the 1989 NASCAR Australia Series season
- Date: 18 December 1988
- Location: Calder Park Thunderdome in Melbourne, Australia
- Course: Permanent racing facility
- Course length: 1.142 miles (1.801 km)
- Distance: 280 laps, 313.35 mi (504.28 km)
- Average speed: 112.007 miles per hour (180.258 km/h)

Pole position
Driver	Dave Marcis	Marcis Auto Racing
- Time: 28.178

Winner
No. 75	Morgan Shepherd	RahMoc Enterprises

The 1988 NASCAR Christmas 500 was a non-championship exhibition NASCAR Winston Cup Series race run at the Calder Park Thunderdome in Melbourne, Australia on 18 December 1988 and the second running of the NASCAR Australian Exhibition. The race also counted as the third round of the 1989 NASCAR Australia Series season. It was the second Winston Cup race held at the track in 1988, the first being February's Goodyear NASCAR 500, won by Neil Bonnett, and the fourth NASCAR race at the track overall, as the opening two rounds of the NASCAR Australia season were also contested at the track, with Allan Grice and Terry Byers winning in June and October respectively.

Headlining the race were Winston Cup Series drivers such as Johnny Rutherford, Sterling Marlin, Harry Gant, Morgan Shepherd, and Dave Marcis. NASCAR Winston West Series drivers such as Ron Esau, J. C. Danielsen, and Roy Smith also competed. The race additionally featured drivers from Australia such as Grice, Peter Brock, and Dick Johnson, as well as New Zealand's Jim Richards and England's Win Percy (although Brock and Percy would fail to qualify).

Shepherd, driving a Pontiac Grand Prix for RahMoc Enterprises, won the race, with Marlin finished the race in second, the only other driver to complete all 280 laps. Gant finished in third, one lap down, followed by Trevor Boys and Rick Wilson, both two laps behind the winner.

== Report ==
=== Background ===
The Thunderdome is a purpose-built 1.801 km (1.119 mi) quad-oval speedway located on the grounds of Calder Park Raceway. It was originally known as the Goodyear Thunderdome to reflect the naming rights sponsorship bought by the Goodyear Tire and Rubber Company. With its "double dogleg" front stretch and the start/finish line located on a straight section rather than the apex of a curve, the Thunderdome is technically a quad-oval in shape, though since its opening it has generally been referred to as a tri-oval. The track, modelled on a scaled down version of the famous Charlotte Motor Speedway, has 24° banking on Turns 1, 2, 3 and 4 while the front stretch is banked at 4° and the back straight at 6°.

==== Entry list ====
No.	Driver	Manufacturer
1	(New Zealand) Jim Richards	Pontiac
2	(Australia) Barry Graham	Chevrolet
3	(Australia) Allan Grice	Oldsmobile
4	(United Kingdom) Win Percy	Oldsmobile
05	(Australia) Peter Brock	Ford
6	(Australia) John Lawes	Oldsmobile
7	(Australia) Barry Blake	Buick
8	(Australia) Ian Clarkson	Chevrolet
10	(Australia) Fred Seery	Chevrolet
11	(United States) Harry Gant	Buick
12	(United States) Rodney Combs	Buick
17	(Australia) Dick Johnson	Ford
18	(United States) Glen Steurer	Chevrolet
21	(Canada) Trevor Boys	Chevrolet
26	(Australia) Terry Byers	Chevrolet
29	(N/A) Bill Mentiplay	Holden
30	(United States) Michael Waltrip	Pontiac
31	(United States) Johnny Rutherford	Oldsmobile
36	(United States) H. B. Bailey	Pontiac
41	(Australia) Gene Cook	Chevrolet
42	(United States) Mark Gibson	Pontiac
48	(Australia) Tony Spanos	Chevrolet
52	(United States) Jimmy Means	Chevrolet
56	(United States) Ron Esau	Oldsmobile
57	(United States) Rick Wilson	Pontiac
64	(United States) Mike Potter	Chevrolet
71	(United States) Dave Marcis	Chevrolet
75	(United States) Morgan Shepherd	Pontiac
81	(United States) David Sosebee	Chevrolet
85	(United States) J. C. Danielsen	Buick
86	(United States) Walter Surma	Chevrolet
88	(Australia) Robin Best	Chevrolet
89	(United States) Bob Howard	Oldsmobile
93	(Canada) Roy Smith	Ford
94	(United States) Sterling Marlin	Oldsmobile

== Qualifying ==
Dave Marcis, driving his self-owned Chevrolet Monte Carlo, won the pole with a time of 28.178 seconds. Morgan Shepherd, driving for February winner RahMoc Enterprises, qualified second, followed by three-time Indianapolis 500 winner Johnny Rutherford in third, Michael Waltrip in fourth, and Sterling Marlin in fifth. 32 drivers would make the field with three failing to qualify, those being Bill Mentiplay, Win Percy, and Peter Brock.

=== Top ten qualifiers ===
Grid	#	Driver	Manufacturer
1	71	(United States) Dave Marcis	Chevrolet
2	75	(United States) Morgan Shepherd	Pontiac
3	31	(United States) Johnny Rutherford	Oldsmobile
4	30	(United States) Michael Waltrip	Pontiac
5	94	(United States) Sterling Marlin	Oldsmobile
6	11	(United States) Harry Gant	Buick
7	57	(United States) Rick Wilson	Pontiac
8	12	(United States) Rodney Combs	Buick
9	17	(Australia) Dick Johnson	Ford
10	93	(Canada) Roy Smith	Ford

== Race results ==
Note: Some statistics, such as laps led and points, are missing, while status and starting position are incomplete.

Fin	St	#	Driver	Manufacturer	Laps	Status
1	2	75	Morgan Shepherd	Pontiac	280	Running
2	5	94	Sterling Marlin	Oldsmobile	280	Running
3	6	11	Harry Gant	Chevrolet	279	Running
4	13	21	Trevor Boys	Chevrolet	278	Running
5	7	57	Rick Wilson	Pontiac	278	Running
6	8	12	Rodney Combs	Buick	277	Running
7	1	71	Dave Marcis	Chevrolet	277	Running
8	11	3	Allan Grice	Oldsmobile	276	
9		56	Ron Esau	Oldsmobile	275	
10	14	18	Glen Steurer	Chevrolet	274	
11		42	Mark Gibson	Pontiac	273	
12	10	93	Roy Smith	Ford	269	
13		85	J. C. Danielsen	Buick	265	
14	9	17	Dick Johnson	Ford	265	
15		6	John Lawes	Oldsmobile	263	
16		26	Terry Byers	Chevrolet	263	
17	3	31	Johnny Rutherford	Oldsmobile	252	Running
18		48	Tony Spanos	Chevrolet	248	
19		8	Ian Clarkson	Chevrolet	245	
20	31	7	Barry Blake	Buick	242	
21		41	Gene Cook	Chevrolet	226	
22		1	Jim Richards	Pontiac	221	
23		86	Walter Surma	Chevrolet	198	
24		88	Robin Best	Chevrolet	173	
25		89	Bob Howard	Oldsmobile	164	
26		81	David Sosebee	Chevrolet	160	
27		36	H. B. Bailey	Pontiac	128	Accident
28	4	30	Michael Waltrip	Pontiac	97	Engine
29		2	Barry Graham	Chevrolet	97	Accident
30	12	64	Mike Potter	Chevrolet	35	
31		10	Fred Seery	Chevrolet	1	Accident
32	15	52	Jimmy Means	Chevrolet	1	Accident
