= 1987 NASCAR Winston Cup Series =

American motorsport season

Seasons
- ← 1986 1988 →

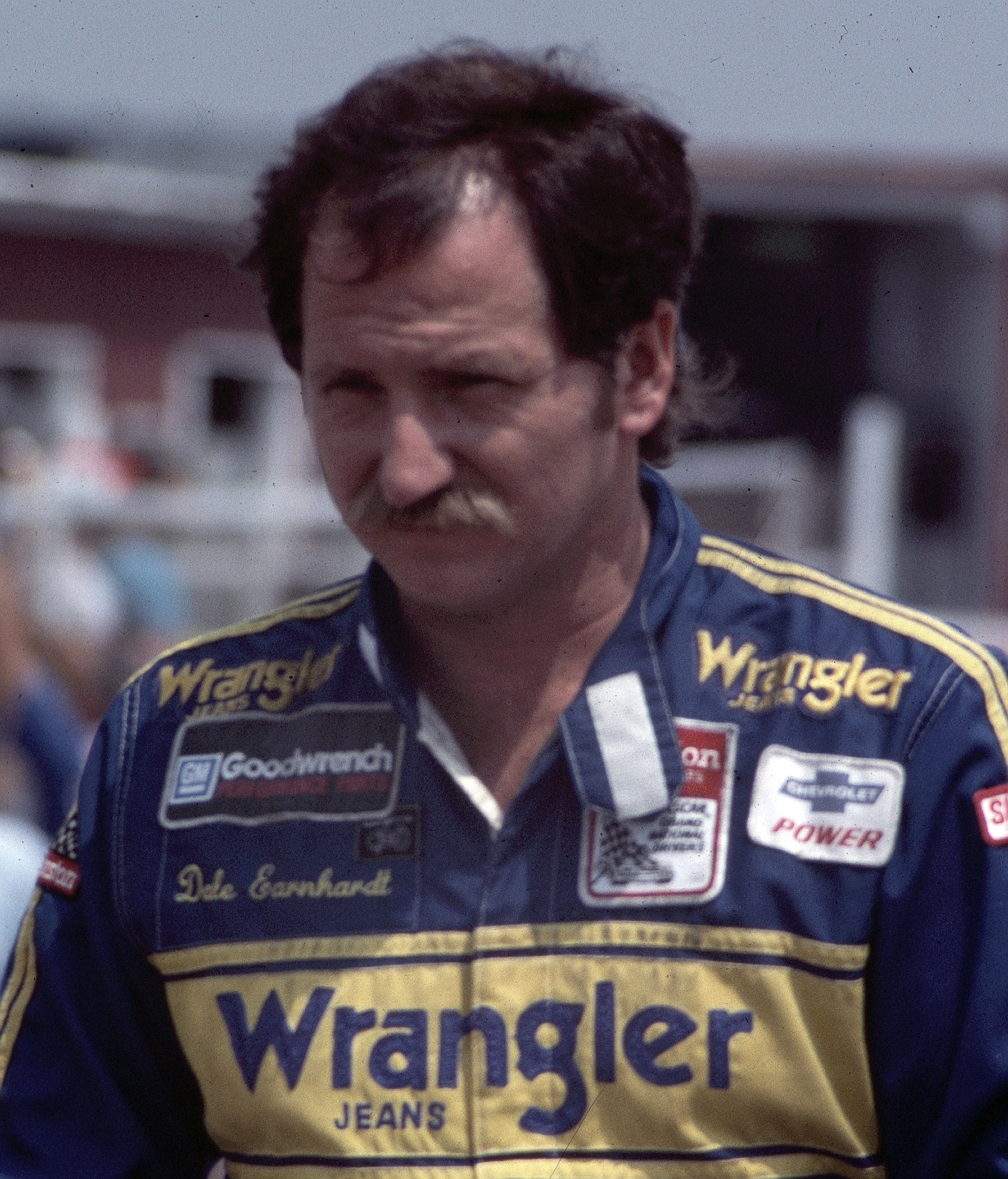
Dale Earnhardt, the 1987 NASCAR Winston Cup Series champion.

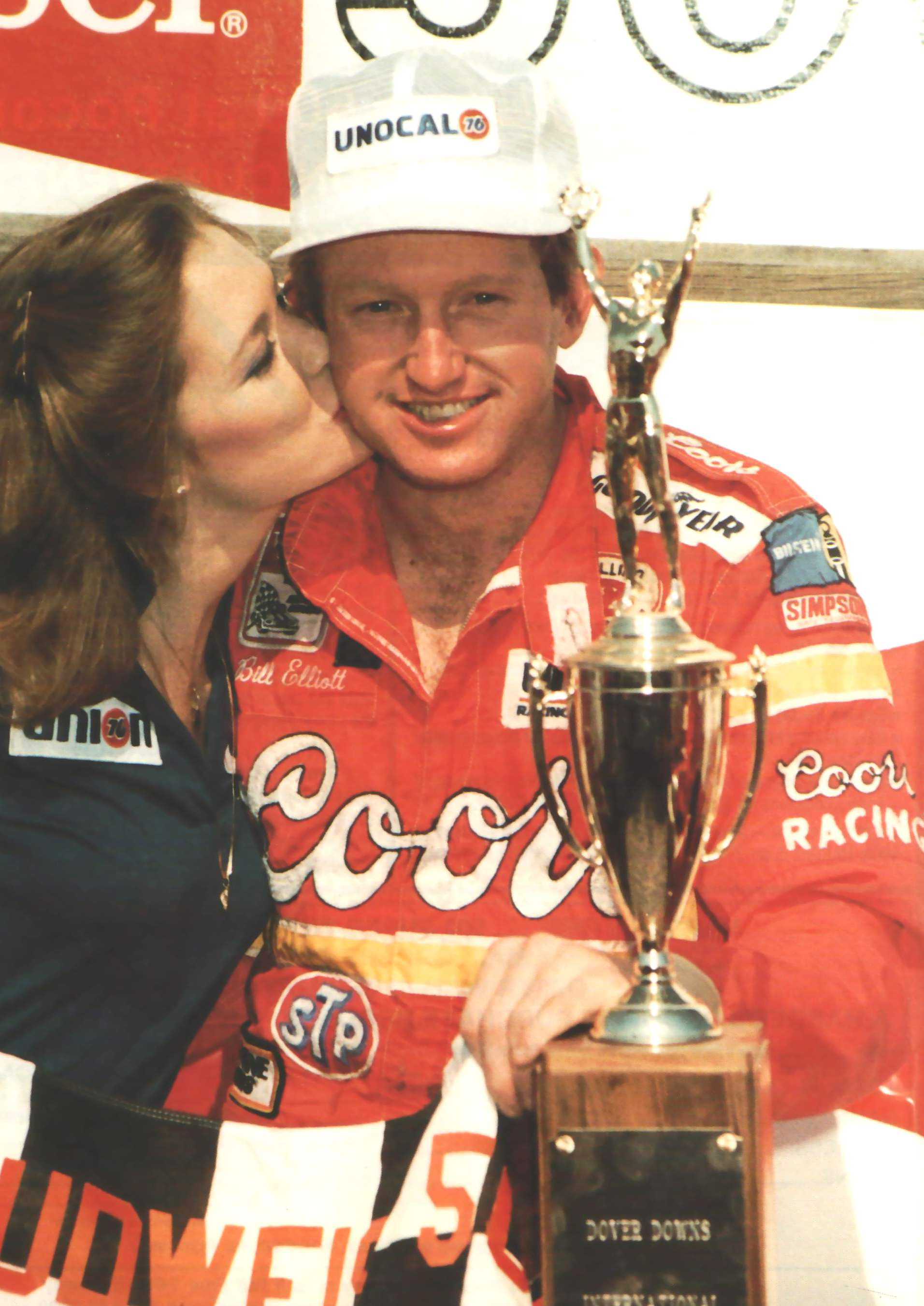
Bill Elliott, finished second in the championship, 489 points back.

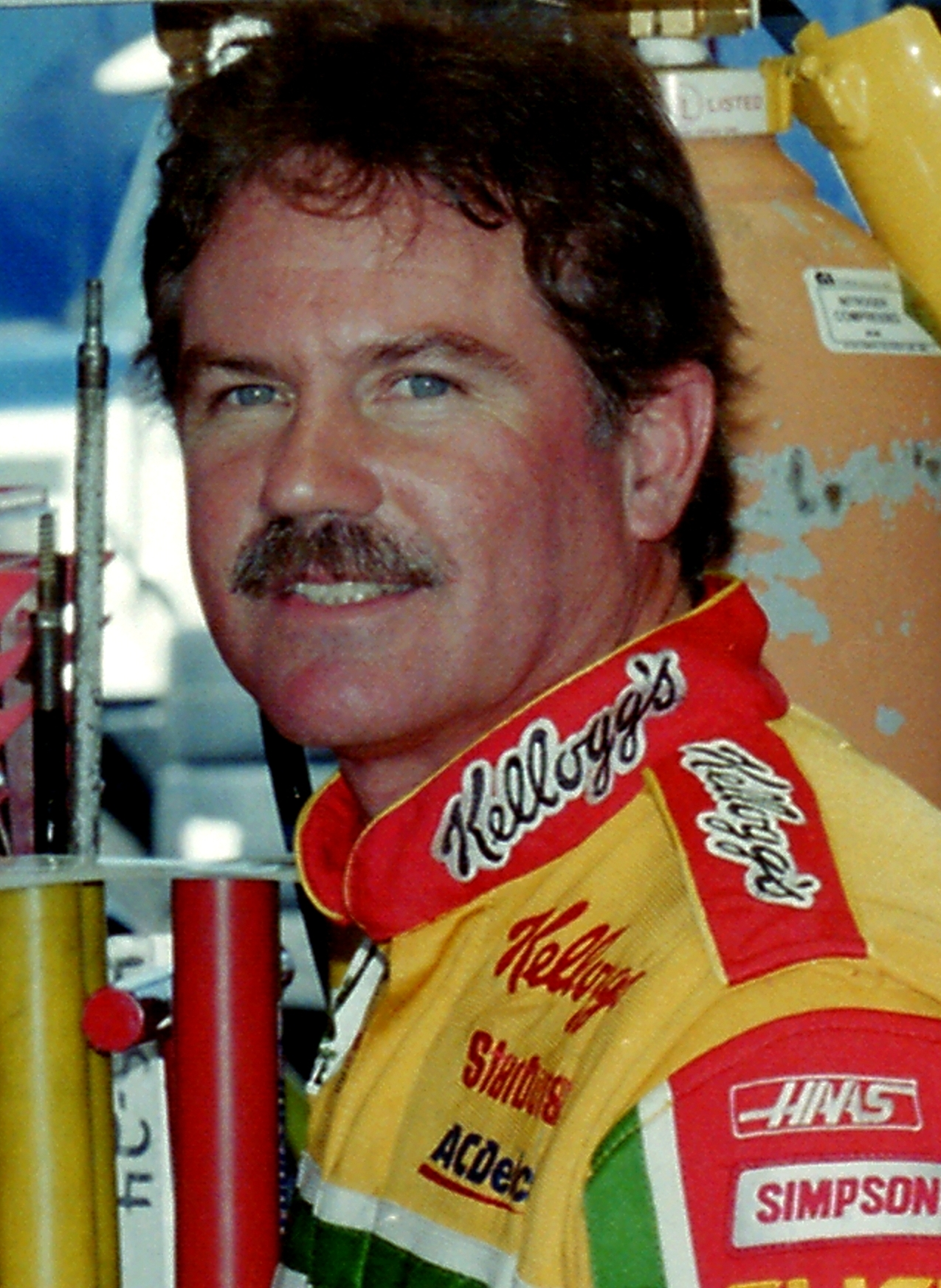
Terry Labonte finished third in the championship, 689 points back.

The 1987 NASCAR Winston Cup Series was the 39th season of professional stock car racing in the United States and the 16th modern-era cup series.

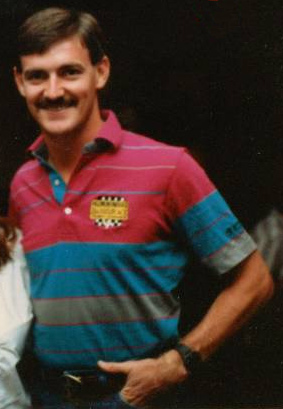
Davey Allison, the 1987 NASCAR Rookie of the Year

The season began on February 8 and ended on November 22. Dale Earnhardt of Richard Childress Racing won the championship for the third time.

== Team changes ==
After three championships together in 1981, 1982, and 1985, Darrell Waltrip decided to move from the No. 11 Junior Johnson Chevrolet to the new No. 17 Chevrolet, a third full-time Hendrick Motorsports team.

A famous quote stemmed from this move, which crew chief Jeff Hammond describes in his book Real Men Work In the Pits went like this:

"I finally got me a thoroughbred." – Darrell Waltrip, referring to his new ride.

"I don't know about any thoroughbred. I do know we had a jackass around here who recently left." – Junior Johnson

The rest of "silly season" looked like this among full-time teams: Terry Labonte left the No. 44 Piedmont Oldsmobile owned by Billy Hagan to replace Waltrip in the No. 11. Johnson decided to disband the No. 12 Budweiser team and let go driver Neil Bonnett, who moved to the No. 75 Pontiac. Morgan Shepherd vacated the No. 75 in favor of the No. 26 Buick owned by Kenny Bernstein, driven by Joe Ruttman in 1986. Phil Parsons would replace older brother Benny in the No. 55 Oldsmobile owned by Leo and Richard Jackson. Lake Speed started out 1986 in the No. 75 RahMoc ride but was let go early in the season. Speed would form his own team for 1987 in the No. 83 Oldsmobile.

A few car number changes took place as well. Kyle Petty would continue to drive the Wood Brothers Ford, switching from No. 7 to No. 21. Alan Kulwicki took the No. 7 for his independent team. Cale Yarborough exited the No. 28 Ford team and drove his self-owned No. 29 Oldsmobile. Davey Allison would compete for Rookie Of The Year in the Harry Ranier No. 28 Ford.. Michael Waltrip would continue driving for Chuck Rider but switched from the No. 23 Chevrolet to the No. 30 Chevrolet.

Drivers remaining with the same teams from 1986 would be: No. 3 Dale Earnhardt (owner: Richard Childress), No. 4 Rick Wilson (Larry McClure) No. 5 Geoff Bodine (Rick Hendrick), No. 8 Bobby Hillin Jr. (Stavola Brothers), No. 9 Bill Elliott ( Harry Melling), No. 15 Ricky Rudd (Bud Moore), No. 18 Tommy Ellis (Eric Freelander), No. 22 Bobby Allison (Stavola Brothers), No. 27 Rusty Wallace (Raymond Beadle), No. 33 Harry Gant (Hal Needham), No. 43 Richard Petty ( Petty Enterprises), No. 52 Jimmy Means, No. 70 J. D. McDuffie (Tom Winkle), No. 71 Dave Marcis, No. 88 Buddy Baker (Baker/Danny Schiff), No. 90 Ken Schrader (Junie Donlavey) and the part-time/independent efforts of No. 14 A. J. Foyt, No. 67 Buddy Arrington, No. 77 Ken Ragan (Marvin Ragan), No. 81 Chet Fillip (Corey Fillip) and No. 89 Jim Sauter (Mueller Brothers).

Top drivers out of a ride included Benny Parsons and Joe Ruttman.

Those who officially threw their hat in the ring for NASCAR Rookie of the Year in 1987 would be: Davey Allison, Steve Christman (No. 62 AC Delco, Tom Winkle), Rodney Combs (No. 10 DiGard) and Derrike Cope (No. 19 Stoke Racing).

Ron Bouchard, Trevor Boys, Eddie Bierschwale and a host of others would battle for the remaining open spots.

== Teams and drivers ==
=== Complete schedule ===
Manufacturer	Team	No.	Driver	Crew Chief
Buick	King Racing	26	Morgan Shepherd	Larry McReynolds
Buick	Stavola Brothers Racing	8	Bobby Hillin Jr.	Bobby Hudson
Buick	Stavola Brothers Racing	22	Bobby Allison	Jimmy Fennig
Chevrolet	Bahari Racing	30	Michael Waltrip	Dick Bahre
Chevrolet	Freedlander Motorsports	18	Tommy Ellis 5	Buddy Parrott 5 Bobby King 24
Chevrolet	Freedlander Motorsports	18	Dale Jarrett (R) 24	Buddy Parrott 5 Bobby King 24
Chevrolet	Hendrick Motorsports	5	Geoff Bodine	Gary Nelson
Chevrolet	Hendrick Motorsports	17	Darrell Waltrip	Waddell Wilson 12; Jeff Hammond 17
Chevrolet	Hendrick Motorsports	35	Benny Parsons	Harry Hyde
Chevrolet	Junior Johnson & Associates	11	Terry Labonte	Jeff Hammond 12; Tim Brewer 17
Chevrolet	Mach 1 Racing	33	Harry Gant	Travis Carter
Chevrolet	Marcis Auto Racing	71	Dave Marcis	
Chevrolet	Richard Childress Racing	3	Dale Earnhardt	Kirk Shelmerdine
Ford	AK Racing	7	Alan Kulwicki	Cliff Champion 4 Bill Ingle 25
Ford	Arrington Racing	67	Eddie Bierschwale 9	Joey Arrington
Ford	Arrington Racing	67	Buddy Arrington 18	Joey Arrington
Ford	Arrington Racing	67	Chet Fillip 2	Joey Arrington
Ford	Bud Moore Engineering	15	Ricky Rudd	Bud Moore
Ford	Donlavey Racing	90	Ken Schrader	Bob Johnson
Ford	Melling Racing	9	Bill Elliott	Ernie Elliott
Ford	Wood Brothers Racing	21	Kyle Petty	Leonard Wood
Oldsmobile	Hagan Racing	44	Sterling Marlin	Steve Hmiel
Oldsmobile	Jackson Brothers Motorsports	55	Phil Parsons	Andy Petree
Pontiac	Blue Max Racing	27	Rusty Wallace	Barry Dodson
Pontiac	Petty Enterprises	43	Richard Petty	Dale Inman
Pontiac	RahMoc Enterprises	75	Neil Bonnett 26	Robin Pemberton
Pontiac	RahMoc Enterprises	75	Joe Ruttman 3	Robin Pemberton
Pontiac 23 Chevrolet 6	Means Racing 28; Hendrick Motorsports 1	52	Jimmy Means	Keith Wilson 28; Dennis Conner 1

=== Limited schedule ===
Manufacturer	Team	No.	Race Driver	Crew Chief	Round(s)
Buick	Spears Motorsports	76	Roman Calczynski	Leon Ruther	1
Buick	Spears Motorsports	76	Tommy Kendall	Leon Ruther	1
Buick	St. James Racing	2	St. James Davis		2
Chevrolet	Adams Racing	38	Ronnie Adams		1
Chevrolet	Adcox Racing	24	Grant Adcox		1
Chevrolet	AAG Racing	34	Jesse Samples Jr.	Ken Allen	3
Chevrolet	AAG Racing	34	Ron Shephard	Ken Allen	1
Chevrolet	AAG Racing	34	Eddie Bierschwale	Ken Allen	1
Chevrolet	Burke Racing	80	Ken Fedewa		1
Chevrolet	Gray Racing	54	Donnie Allison		2
Chevrolet	Gray Racing	54	Kevin Evans		1
Chevrolet	H. L. Waters Racing	49	Delma Cowart		1
Chevrolet	Harry Goularte	14	Harry Goularte	Mike Biechman	2
Chevrolet	Hendrick Motorsports	25	Tim Richmond	Dennis Conner	8
Chevrolet	Hendrick Motorsports	25	Rick Hendrick	Dennis Conner	1
Chevrolet	Hendrick Motorsports	51	Jim Fitzgerald		1
Chevrolet	Holden Racing	68	Jerry Holden		3
Chevrolet	Hylton Motorsports	48	Steve Moore		1
Chevrolet	Hylton Motorsports	48	James Hylton		4
Chevrolet	Hylton Motorsports	48	Tony Spanos		5
Chevrolet	Hylton Motorsports	48	Jerry Holden		1
Chevrolet	Edwards Racing	32	Jonathan Lee Edwards		3
Chevrolet	Ellington Racing	1	Ron Bouchard	Runt Pittman	5
Chevrolet	Ellington Racing	1	Brett Bodine (R)	Runt Pittman	14
Chevrolet	Elmer Simko	51	David Simko		5
Chevrolet	Linro Motorsports	63	Jocko Maggiacomo		5
Chevrolet	Midgley Racing	29	George Follmer		2
Chevrolet	Pearson Racing	16	Larry Pearson	Ricky Pearson	4
Chevrolet	Paul Racing	69	Donny Paul		1
Chevrolet	Reno Enterprises	56	Ernie Irvan	Marc Reno	2
Chevrolet	Ron Shephard Racing	31	Ron Shephard		3
Chevrolet	Ronnie Thomas Racing	41	Ronnie Thomas		5
Chevrolet	Schmitt Racing	73	Bill Schmitt		2
Chevrolet	Steurer Racing	81	Glen Steurer	Mike Steurer	1
Chevrolet	Vincent Racing	41	Jack Sellers		2
Chevrolet	Wawak Racing	74	Bobby Wawak		14
Ford	Arrington Racing	61	Mike Potter		1
Ford	Beahr Racing	37	Curtis Markham		1
Ford	Branch-Ragan Racing	77	Ken Ragan		6
Ford	Branch-Ragan Racing	77	Eddie Bierschwale		3
Ford	Fillip Racing	81	Chet Fillip	Corey Fillip	5
Ford	Fillip Racing	81	Buddy Arrington	Corey Fillip	2
Ford	Fillip Racing	81	Mike Potter	Corey Fillip	9
Ford	Fillip Racing	81	Eddie Bierschwale	Corey Fillip	1
Ford	Fillip Racing	81	Slick Johnson	Corey Fillip	1
Ford	Good Racing	76	Phil Good		2
Ford	Jerry Bowman Racing	58	Jerry Bowman		1
Ford	Langley Racing	64	Connie Saylor	Elmo Langley	4
Ford	Langley Racing	64	Jerry Cranmer (R)	Elmo Langley	5
Ford	Langley Racing	64	Rodney Combs	Elmo Langley	10
Ford	Langley Racing	64	Rick McCray	Elmo Langley	2
Ford	Langley Racing	64	Trevor Boys	Elmo Langley	4
Ford	Langley Racing	64	Curtis Markham	Elmo Langley	3
Ford	Stahl Racing	82	Mark Stahl	Ron Gautsche	11
Ford	Ranier-Lundy Racing	28	Davey Allison (R)	Joey Knuckles	22
Ford	Razore Racing	79	Roy Smith		2
Ford	Wangerin Racing	39	Blackie Wangerin		3
Oldsmobile	A. J. Foyt Enterprises	14	A. J. Foyt	Dick Hutcherson	5
Oldsmobile	Baker-Schiff Racing	88	Buddy Baker	Doug Richert	20
Oldsmobile	Baker-Schiff Racing	88	Irv Hoerr	Doug Richert	1
Oldsmobile	Bob Clark Motorsports	31	Brad Teague		2
Oldsmobile	Cale Yarborough Motorsports	29	Cale Yarborough	Jake Elder 4 Cliff Champion 12	16
Oldsmobile	George Wiltshire	39	George Wiltshire		1
Oldsmobile	Hamby Racing	12	David Sosebee		3
Oldsmobile	Hamby Racing	12	Slick Johnson		7
Oldsmobile	Hamby Racing	12	Mark Martin		1
Oldsmobile	Hamby Racing	12	Larry Pollard		4
Oldsmobile	Hamby Racing	12	Jim Bown		2
Oldsmobile	Hamby Racing	12	Trevor Boys		7
Oldsmobile	Hamby Racing	12	Jeff Swindell		1
Oldsmobile	Hamby Racing	12	Brad Teague		1
Oldsmobile	Hamby Racing	12	Larry Caudill		1
Oldsmobile	Hamby Racing	12	Rodney Combs		1
Oldsmobile	Jackson Brothers Motorsports	66	Tom Sneva		1
Oldsmobile	Jaehne Motorsports	76	Hut Stricklin		3
Oldsmobile	KC Racing	66	John Krebs	Fred Correa	2
Oldsmobile	Lois Williams Racing	78	Jim Robinson		2
Oldsmobile	Morgan-McClure Motorsports	4	Rick Wilson	Tony Glover	19
Oldsmobile	Morgan-McClure Motorsports	14	A. J. Foyt	Dick Hutcherson	1
Oldsmobile	Speed Racing	83	Lake Speed	Darrell Bryant	14
Pontiac	Bailey Racing	36	H. B. Bailey		7
Pontiac	Bailey Racing	36	Joe Dan Bailey		1
Pontiac	Bryant Racing	2	Kirk Bryant	Darrell Bryant	2
Pontiac	Dingman Brothers Racing	50	Greg Sacks	David Ifft	17
Pontiac	Henley Gray	1	Chuck Schroedel (R)		1
Pontiac	McDuffie Racing	70	J. D. McDuffie	Jeff McDuffie	22
Pontiac	Ray Kelly Racing	77	Ray Kelly		1
Pontiac	Winkle Motorsports	62	Steve Christman (R)		25
Pontiac	Winkle Motorsports	70	J. D. McDuffie	Jeff McDuffie	3
Chevrolet 26 Oldsmobile 1	U.S. Racing	6	Trevor Boys		1
Chevrolet 26 Oldsmobile 1	U.S. Racing	6	D. K. Ulrich		7
Chevrolet 26 Oldsmobile 1	U.S. Racing	6	Bobby Baker		1
Chevrolet 26 Oldsmobile 1	U.S. Racing	6	Rick Knoop		3
Chevrolet 26 Oldsmobile 1	U.S. Racing	6	Connie Saylor		9
Chevrolet 26 Oldsmobile 1	U.S. Racing	6	Ron Esau		1
Chevrolet 26 Oldsmobile 1	U.S. Racing	6	Troy Beebe		1
Chevrolet 26 Oldsmobile 1	U.S. Racing	6	Ernie Irvan		3
Chevrolet 4 Ford 3	S & H Racing	80	Jimmy Horton		3
Chevrolet 4 Ford 3	S & H Racing	80	Eddie Bierschwale		4
Ford 7Chevrolet 5	Stoke Racing	19	Derrike Cope (R)		12
Ford 7Chevrolet 5	Stoke Racing	32	Ruben Garcia		2
Oldsmobile 1 Chevrolet 2	DiGard Motorsports	10	Rodney Combs (R)	Roland Wlodyka	3
Oldsmobile 1 Chevrolet 3	Barkdoll Racing	73	Phil Barkdoll		4

== Preseason ==
- January 8, 1987 – Tim Richmond announced that he would miss the first part of 1987 due to "double pneumonia." Benny Parsons was hired to replace Richmond in the Folgers Chevrolet for car owner Rick Hendrick. The car number was changed to 35, saving the 25 for Richmond's return. He returned for eight races mid-season, winning his first 2 races back at Pocono and Riverside. These eight races were the last races that Richmond would ever run in NASCAR.
- February 4, 1987 – Bruce Jacobi died at Methodist Hospital in Indianapolis, IN. Jacobi was injured in the first Twin 125-mile qualifying race on February 17, 1983, and had been in a coma since then.

== Schedule ==
No.	Race title	Track	Date
	Busch Clash	Daytona International Speedway, Daytona Beach	February 8
	7-Eleven Twin 125's	Daytona International Speedway, Daytona Beach	February 12
1	Daytona 500	Daytona International Speedway, Daytona Beach	February 15
2	Goodwrench 500	North Carolina Motor Speedway, Rockingham	March 1
3	Miller High Life 400	Richmond Fairgrounds Raceway, Richmond	March 8
4	Motorcraft Quality Parts 500	Atlanta International Raceway, Hampton	March 15
5	TranSouth 500	Darlington Raceway, Darlington	March 29
6	First Union 400	North Wilkesboro Speedway, North Wilkesboro	April 5
7	Valleydale Meats 500	Bristol International Raceway, Bristol	April 12
8	Sovran Bank 500	Martinsville Speedway, Ridgeway	April 26
9	Winston 500	Alabama International Motor Speedway, Talladega	May 3
	Winston Open	Charlotte Motor Speedway, Concord	May 17
	The Winston	Charlotte Motor Speedway, Concord	May 17
10	Coca-Cola 600	Charlotte Motor Speedway, Concord	May 24
11	Budweiser 500	Dover Downs International Speedway, Dover	May 31
12	Miller High Life 500	Pocono International Raceway, Long Pond	June 14
13	Budweiser 400	Riverside International Raceway, Riverside	June 21
14	Miller American 400	Michigan International Speedway, Brooklyn	June 28
15	Pepsi Firecracker 400	Daytona International Speedway, Daytona Beach	July 4
16	Summer 500	Pocono International Raceway, Long Pond	July 19
17	Talladega 500	Alabama International Motor Speedway, Talladega	July 26
18	Budweiser at The Glen	Watkins Glen International, Watkins Glen	August 10
19	Champion Spark Plug 400	Michigan International Speedway, Brooklyn	August 16
20	Busch 500	Bristol International Raceway, Bristol	August 22
21	Southern 500	Darlington Raceway, Darlington	September 6
22	Wrangler Jeans Indigo 400	Richmond Fairgrounds Raceway, Richmond	September 13
23	Delaware 500	Dover Downs International Speedway, Dover	September 20
24	Goody's 500	Martinsville Speedway, Ridgeway	September 27
25	Holly Farms 400	North Wilkesboro Speedway, North Wilkesboro	October 4
26	Oakwood Homes 500	Charlotte Motor Speedway, Concord	October 11
27	AC Delco 500	North Carolina Motor Speedway, Rockingham	October 25
28	Winston Western 500	Riverside International Raceway, Riverside	November 8
29	Atlanta Journal 500	Atlanta International Raceway, Hampton	November 22

== Season summary ==
=== Busch Clash ===
The Busch Clash, an annual invitational event for all Busch Pole winners the previous season, was held February 8 at Daytona International Speedway. Bill Elliott drew for the pole. Alan Kulwicki was the wild card.

Results

1. # 9 – Bill Elliott
2. #5 – Geoff Bodine
3. #17 – Darrell Waltrip
4. #3 – Dale Earnhardt
5. #7 – Alan Kulwicki
6. #29 – Cale Yarborough
7. #35 – Benny Parsons
8. #33 – Harry Gant
9. #11 – Terry Labonte
10. #15 – Ricky Rudd

=== 7-Eleven Twin 125's ===
The 7-Eleven Twin 125's, a pair of qualifying races for the Daytona 500, were held February 12 at Daytona International Speedway. Bill Elliott and Davey Allison won the poles for both races, respectively, as a result of their speeds in qualifying on February 9.

Race One: Top Ten Results

1. #90 – Ken Schrader
2. #9 – Bill Elliott
3. #17 – Darrell Waltrip
4. #88 – Buddy Baker
5. #4 – Rick Wilson
6. #43 – Richard Petty
7. #3 – Dale Earnhardt
8. #75 – Neil Bonnett
9. #1 – Ron Bouchard
10. #55 – Phil Parsons

Notes:

- Jocko Maggiacomo DNS.
- This race featured two flips: Phil Barkdoll and Tommy Ellis. A. J. Foyt was involved in the Ellis wreck and suffered a shoulder injury.

Race Two: Top Ten Results

1. #35-Benny Parsons
2. #22-Bobby Allison
3. #5-Geoff Bodine
4. #44-Sterling Marlin
5. #33-Harry Gant
6. #28-Davey Allison
7. #11-Terry Labonte
8. #71-Dave Marcis
9. #30-Michael Waltrip
10. #21-Kyle Petty

=== Round 1: Daytona 500 ===
The 29th annual Daytona 500 was held February 15. Bill Elliott won the pole

==== Top Ten Results ====
1. #9 – Bill Elliott
2. #35 – Benny Parsons
3. #43 – Richard Petty
4. #88 – Buddy Baker
5. #3 – Dale Earnhardt
6. #22 – Bobby Allison
7. #90 – Ken Schrader
8. #17 – Darrell Waltrip
9. #15 – Ricky Rudd
10. #29 – Cale Yarborough

Failed to qualify: 18-Tommy Ellis, 24-Grant Adcox, 32-Jonathan Lee Edwards, 39-Blackie Wangerin, 41-Ronnie Thomas, 48-Steve Moore, 49-Delma Cowart, 51-David Simko, 54-Donnie Allison, 62-Steve Christman, 74-Bobby Wawak, 89-Jim Sauter, 93-Charlie Baker, 98-Ed Pimm, 00-Dick McCabe, 02-Joe Booher, 09-Jeff Swindell, 63-Jocko Maggiacomo (did not start qualifying race).

=== Round 2: Goodwrench 500 ===
The Goodwrench 500 was held March 1 at North Carolina Motor Speedway. Davey Allison won his first career pole.

Top Ten Results

1. #3 – Dale Earnhardt
2. #15 – Ricky Rudd
3. #75 – Neil Bonnett
4. #9 – Bill Elliott
5. #26 – Morgan Shepherd (-1)
6. #27 – Rusty Wallace (-1)
7. #17 – Darrell Waltrip (-2)
8. #11 – Terry Labonte (-2)
9. #28 – Davey Allison (-2)
10. #90 – Ken Schrader (-3)
- Dale Earnhardt led 319 out of 492 laps en route to his first victory of the season.

=== Round 3: Miller High Life 400 ===
The Miller High Life 400 was held March 8 at Richmond Fairgrounds Raceway. Alan Kulwicki won his first career pole.

Top Ten Results

1. #3 – Dale Earnhardt
2. #5 – Geoff Bodine
3. #27 – Rusty Wallace
4. #9 – Bill Elliott
5. #11 – Terry Labonte
6. #7 – Alan Kulwicki
7. #21 – Kyle Petty (-1)
8. #71 – Dave Marcis (-1)
9. #22 – Bobby Allison (-1)
10. #35 – Benny Parsons (-2)

Failed to qualify: Ron Sheppard (#34), Tony Spanos (#48), Lake Speed (#83), Bob Hollar (#02)

=== Round 4: Motorcraft Quality Parts 500 ===
The Motorcraft Quality Parts 500 was held March 15 at Atlanta International Raceway. Dale Earnhardt won the pole.

Top Ten Results

1. #15 – Ricky Rudd
2. #35 – Benny Parsons
3. #27 – Rusty Wallace
4. #11 – Terry Labonte
5. #28 – Davey Allison (-1)
6. #17 – Darrell Waltrip (-1)
7. #75 – Neil Bonnett (-1)
8. #29 – Cale Yarborough (-1)
9. #42 – Kyle Petty (-1)
10. #26 – Morgan Shepherd (-2)

Failed to qualify: Jerry Holden (#68), Bobby Wawak (#74)

- Dale Earnhardt led 196 laps, but a mechanical problem would leave him out of contention.
- A restart with eight laps remaining left a four car battle for the victory. Ricky Rudd managed to pull away from Benny Parsons to take his first victory of the season, and seventh of his career.

=== Round 5: TranSouth 500 ===
The TranSouth 500 was held March 29 at Darlington Raceway. Ken Schrader won the pole.

Top Ten Results

1. #3 – Dale Earnhardt
2. #9 – Bill Elliott
3. #43 – Richard Petty
4. #44 – Sterling Marlin
5. #90 – Ken Schrader
6. #75 – Neil Bonnett
7. #33 – Harry Gant (-1)
8. #1 – Ron Bouchard (-1)
9. #55 – Phil Parsons (-1)
10. #17 – Darrell Waltrip (-1)

Failed to qualify: Mike Potter (#81), Mark Stahl (#82)

- Bill Elliott was leading at the white flag but ran out of gas in Turn 3. This allowed Dale Earnhardt to overtake Elliott and cruise to victory.
- At one point in the race, Benny Parsons, having hit the wall early, attempted to make a pit stop only for crew chief Harry Hyde to tell him that the crew was in the middle of a break for ice cream, inspiring a scene in the film Days of Thunder, where fictional driver Cole Trickle, played by Tom Cruise, is denied a pit stop due to his team eating ice cream.

=== Round 6: First Union 400 ===
The First Union 400 was held April 5 at North Wilkesboro Speedway. Bill Elliott won the pole.

Top Ten Results

1. #3 – Dale Earnhardt
2. #21 – Kyle Petty
3. #75 – Neil Bonnett
4. #7 – Alan Kulwicki
5. #15 – Ricky Rudd (-1)
6. #43 – Richard Petty (-1)
7. #55 – Phil Parsons (-1)
8. #11 – Terry Labonte* (-2)
9. #27 – Rusty Wallace (-2)
10. #9 – Bill Elliott (-2)
- Dale Earnhardt won the race in dominating fashion, leading 319 out of 400 laps to claim his second straight victory and fourth of the season.
- Terry Labonte was injured the previous week at Darlington, and was relieved by Brett Bodine at an early pit stop.
- This was the final race for DiGard Motorsports, as the team's assets were sold to Whitcomb Racing before the 1988 season.

=== Round 7: Valleydale Meats 500 ===
The Valleydale Meats 500 was held April 12 at Bristol International Raceway. Harry Gant won the pole.

Top Ten Results

1. #3 – Dale Earnhardt
2. #43 – Richard Petty
3. #15 – Ricky Rudd
4. #9 – Bill Elliott
5. #7 – Alan Kulwicki
6. #33 – Harry Gant
7. #21 – Kyle Petty
8. #26 – Morgan Shepherd (-1)
9. #11 – Terry Labonte (-1)
10. #18 – Dale Jarrett (-3)
- After leading the most laps, Bill Elliott was surpassed by Dale Earnhardt with 115 laps to go. Earnhardt would hold on for his fifth victory of the season.

=== Round 8: Sovran Bank 500 ===
The Sovran Bank 500 was held April 26 at Martinsville Speedway. Morgan Shepherd won the pole.

Top Ten Results

1. #3 – Dale Earnhardt
2. #27 – Rusty Wallace
3. #5 – Geoff Bodine
4. #55 – Phil Parsons
5. #11 – Terry Labonte (-2)
6. #9 – Bill Elliott (-2)
7. #90 – Ken Schrader (-2)
8. #22 – Bobby Allison (-3)
9. #75 – Neil Bonnett (-4)
10. #30 – Michael Waltrip (-5)

=== Round 9: Winston 500 ===
The Winston 500 was held May 3 at Alabama International Motor Speedway. Bill Elliott won the pole at a record speed of 212.809 mph (44.998 seconds), a record that still stands today and will likely never be broken.

Top Ten Results

1. #28 – Davey Allison
2. #11 – Terry Labonte
3. #21 – Kyle Petty
4. #3 – Dale Earnhardt
5. #8 – Bobby Hillin Jr.
6. #27 – Rusty Wallace
7. #75 – Neil Bonnett
8. #90 – Ken Schrader
9. #83 – Lake Speed (-1)
10. #26 – Morgan Shepherd (-1)
- This race was remembered for a near-tragedy early when Bobby Allison flew into the fence and nearly landed in the front stretch grandstands. Though Allison was not injured, a female fan lost an eye as a result of being struck by debris. Eventually, this crash would lead to the introduction of restrictor plates in 1988, and the practice would continue until the 2019 Daytona 500. Allison's crash caused a 2½ hour red flag to repair the catch fence, and the race was shortened to 178 laps due to darkness.
- This was Davey Allison's first career Winston Cup victory, in only his 14th career start.

=== Exhibition: The Winston ===
The Winston, an annual invitational race for previous winners in Winston Cup, was held May 17 at Charlotte Motor Speedway. Bill Elliott won the pole.

Top Ten Results

1. #3 – Dale Earnhardt
2. #11 – Terry Labonte
3. #25 – Tim Richmond
4. #5 – Geoff Bodine
5. #27 – Rusty Wallace
6. #21 – Kyle Petty
7. #26 – Morgan Shepherd
8. #22 – Bobby Allison
9. #17 – Darrell Waltrip
10. #55 – Benny Parsons
- At one point, Bill Elliott's car nicked the rear of Earnhardt's, sending the latter into the infield grass. But no sooner did Earnhardt drive through the grass than he drove onto the track once more. That incident came to be known as "The Pass in the Grass." With eight laps to go, contact with Earnhardt cut down Elliott's tire. An angry Elliott retaliated by bumping Earnhardt after the race was over.
- This race would be the breakthrough edition NASCAR envisioned, with the adoption of the non-winners "last chance" race and the 19 most recent NASCAR race winners in the feature of 75, 50, and 10 laps.

=== Round 10: Coca-Cola 600 ===
The Coca-Cola 600 was held May 24 at Charlotte Motor Speedway. The No. 9 of Bill Elliott won the pole.

Top Ten Results

1. #21 – Kyle Petty
2. #26 – Morgan Shepherd (-1)
3. #83 – Lake Speed (-1)
4. #43 – Richard Petty (-2)
5. #17 – Darrell Waltrip (-2)
6. #11 – Terry Labonte (-2)
7. #88 – Buddy Baker (-2)
8. #55 – Phil Parsons (-2)
9. #89 – Jim Sauter (-4)
10. #27 – Rusty Wallace (-4)
- This race was notable for the sheer amount of attrition. Out of the 42 cars that started the 600 mile event, only 17 of them finished the race.
- 21 years before Marcos Ambrose made his debut in the series, Allan Grice became the first Australian driver to qualify for a Winston Cup race. In his first ever run on an oval track, Grice qualified his Oldsmobile Delta 88 in 35th position.
- Kyle Petty won this race by over 1 lap over Morgan Shepherd. This would be Kyle Petty’s last win with the Wood Brothers. Petty left the team following a dismal 1988 season to drive for Felix Sabates.

=== Round 11: Budweiser 500 ===
The Budweiser 500 was held May 31 at Dover Downs International Speedway. Bill Elliott won the pole.

Top Ten Results

1. #28 – Davey Allison
2. #9 – Bill Elliott
3. #11 – Terry Labonte (-1)
4. #3 – Dale Earnhardt (-2)
5. #35 – Benny Parsons (-2)
6. #90 – Ken Schrader (-2)
7. #17 – Darrell Waltrip (-4)
8. #71 – Dave Marcis (-4)
9. #75 – Neil Bonnett (-6)
10. #44 – Sterling Marlin (-6)
- This was Davey Allison's second and last victory of his rookie season. It would make him the last rookie to win a Winston Cup race until Tony Stewart won 3 races in 1999.

=== Round 12: Miller High Life 500 ===
The Miller High Life 500 was held June 14 at Pocono International Raceway. The No. 11 of Terry Labonte won the pole.

Top Ten Results

1. #25 – Tim Richmond
2. #9 – Bill Elliott
3. #21 – Kyle Petty
4. #29 – Cale Yarborough
5. #3 – Dale Earnhardt
6. #22 – Bobby Allison
7. #15 – Ricky Rudd
8. #75 – Neil Bonnett
9. #5 – Geoff Bodine
10. #88 – Buddy Baker
- This was Tim Richmond's first start of 1987. Late in the 1986 season, Richmond came down with what was thought of as "double pneumonia." This caused him to miss most of the season.

=== Round 13: Budweiser 400 ===
The Budweiser 400 was held June 21 at Riverside International Raceway. Terry Labonte won the pole.

Top Ten Results

1. #25 – Tim Richmond
2. #15 – Ricky Rudd
3. #75 – Neil Bonnett
4. #11 – Terry Labonte
5. #9 – Bill Elliott
6. #43 – Richard Petty
7. #3 – Dale Earnhardt
8. #22 – Bobby Allison
9. #44 – Sterling Marlin
10. #90 – Ken Schrader
- Richard Petty, not fully recovered from rib injuries sustained in a crash at the Miller High Life 500 at Pocono a week earlier, ran only the pace lap before giving way to Joe Ruttman while Petty moved to the ESPN broadcast booth.
- This was Tim Richmond's final career victory.

=== Round 14: Miller American 400 ===
The Miller American 400 was held June 28 at Michigan International Speedway. Rusty Wallace won his 1st career pole.

Top Ten Results

1. #3 – Dale Earnhardt
2. #28 – Davey Allison
3. #21 – Kyle Petty
4. #25 – Tim Richmond
5. #27 – Rusty Wallace
6. #8 – Bobby Hillin Jr.
7. #17 – Darrell Waltrip (-1)
8. #90 – Ken Schrader (-1)
9. #35 – Benny Parsons (-1)
10. #83 – Lake Speed (-1)

=== Round 15: Pepsi Firecracker 400 ===
The Pepsi Firecracker 400 was held July 4 at Daytona International Speedway. The No. 28 of Davey Allison won the pole.

Top Ten Results

1. #22 – Bobby Allison
2. #88 – Buddy Baker
3. #71 – Dave Marcis
4. #17 – Darrell Waltrip
5. #26 – Morgan Shepherd
6. #3 – Dale Earnhardt
7. #90 – Ken Schrader
8. #27 – Rusty Wallace
9. #33 – Harry Gant
10. #11 – Terry Labonte
- In this race, smaller carburetors (the size used in the Busch Series) were mandated by NASCAR at Daytona and Talladega in an attempt to slow the cars. The pole speed was just over 198 mph as compared to over 210 mph in February.
- NASCAR officials experienced scoring difficulties late in the race, and at one point, were scoring leader Bobby Allison as one lap down. Final results properly restored the missing lap to Allison's total, and he was credited with the victory.
- On the final lap, Ken Schrader got loose coming out of turn four, spun, and barrel-rolled in the tri-oval just shy of the start/finish line. He collected Harry Gant, slid across the finish line, and still finished in 7th place. Schrader's flip can be seen in the movie Days of Thunder.

=== Round 16: Summer 500 ===
The Summer 500 was held July 19 at Pocono International Raceway. Tim Richmond won the pole for the final time in his career.

Top Ten Results

1. #3 – Dale Earnhardt
2. #7 – Alan Kulwicki
3. #88 – Buddy Baker
4. #35 – Benny Parsons
5. #28 – Davey Allison
6. #11 – Terry Labonte
7. #75 – Neil Bonnett
8. #43 – Richard Petty (-1)
9. #71 – Dave Marcis (-1)
10. #90 – Ken Schrader (-1)

=== Round 17: Talladega 500 ===
The Talladega 500 was held July 26 at Alabama International Motor Speedway. Bill Elliott won the pole at 203.827 mph (328.028 km/h) with the smaller Busch series carburetors.

Top Ten Results

1. #9 – Bill Elliott
2. #28 – Davey Allison
3. #3 – Dale Earnhardt
4. #17 – Darrell Waltrip
5. #29 – Cale Yarborough
6. #11 – Terry Labonte
7. #83 – Lake Speed
8. #27 – Rusty Wallace
9. #21 – Kyle Petty
10. #88 – Buddy Baker

=== Round 18: The Budweiser at The Glen ===
The Budweiser at The Glen was scheduled for Sunday August 9 at Watkins Glen International but due to rain, the race was postponed and held Monday August 10. Terry Labonte won the pole.

Top Ten Results

1. #27 – Rusty Wallace
2. #11 – Terry Labonte
3. #71 – Dave Marcis
4. #15 – Ricky Rudd
5. #35 – Benny Parsons
6. #7 – Alan Kulwicki
7. #55 – Phil Parsons
8. #3 – Dale Earnhardt
9. #22 – Bobby Allison
10. #25 – Tim Richmond
- Rusty Wallace had a commanding lead in the final laps of the race, but prior to the white flag, he started running out of fuel. Rusty made a quick pit stop for gas, but kept his lead and held on for the win.

=== Round 19: Champion Spark Plug 400 ===
The Champion Spark Plug 400 was held August 16 at Michigan International Speedway. Davey Allison won the pole.

Top Ten Results

1. #9 – Bill Elliott
2. #3 – Dale Earnhardt
3. #26 – Morgan Shepherd
4. #27 – Rusty Wallace
5. #28 – Davey Allison
6. #7 – Alan Kulwicki
7. #22 – Bobby Allison
8. #88 – Buddy Baker
9. #75 – Neil Bonnett
10. #5 – Geoff Bodine
- This was Tim Richmond's final race; he was running 8th when his engine blew. (It's believed he purposely over-revved it to blow it up, because he was suffering from severe exhaustion caused by what turned out to be a then-unknown bout with the AIDS virus.) He would be credited with a 29th place finish.
- Members of the print media covering the race were witnesses to the Northwest Airlines Flight 255 plane crash later in the day. Tom Higgins of The Charlotte Observer was involved in coverage of the plane crash, as he had just checked into the nearby hotel awaiting a Monday morning flight to Charlotte following the race.
- This would mark Bill Elliott's third consecutive Champion Spark Plug 400 victory.
- Richard Petty would lead 28 laps and was part of an 8-car battle for the win before crashing out during the final lap.

=== Round 20: Busch 500 ===
The Busch 500 was held August 22 at Bristol International Raceway. Terry Labonte won the pole.

Top Ten Results

1. #3 – Dale Earnhardt
2. #27 – Rusty Wallace
3. #15 – Ricky Rudd
4. #11 – Terry Labonte
5. #43 – Richard Petty
6. #5 – Geoff Bodine (-3)
7. #4 – Rick Wilson (-4)
8. #33 – Harry Gant (-5)
9. #9 – Bill Elliott (-6)
10. #75 – Neil Bonnett (-6)

Failed to qualify: Tony Spanos (No. 48), Troy Beebe (No. 6), Mike Potter (No. 81), J. D. McDuffie (No. 70)

=== Round 21: Southern 500 ===
The Southern 500 was held September 6 at Darlington Raceway. Davey Allison won the pole.

Top Ten Results

1. #3 – Dale Earnhardt
2. #27 – Rusty Wallace
3. #43 – Richard Petty
4. #44 – Sterling Marlin
5. #11 – Terry Labonte
6. #8 – Bobby Hillin Jr.
7. #15 – Ricky Rudd
8. #9 – Bill Elliott
9. #26 – Morgan Shepherd
10. #17 – Darrell Waltrip
- The race was shortened to 202 laps due to rain.
- Going into this race three drivers had a shot at a special $100,000 bonus from Winston if they won this race because they had won the three previous Winston Million races. Bill Elliott won the Daytona 500, Davey Allison won the Winston 500, and Kyle Petty won the Coca Cola 600. Davey crashed out of the race on lap 164 finishing 29th. Kyle finished 14th 2 laps down to the winner. Bill could only muster 8th so ultimately no one won the bonus for 1987.

=== Round 22: Wrangler Jeans Indigo 400 ===
The Wrangler Jeans Indigo 400 was held September 13 at Richmond Fairgrounds Raceway. Alan Kulwicki won the pole.

Top Ten Results

1. #3 – Dale Earnhardt
2. #17 – Darrell Waltrip
3. #15 – Ricky Rudd
4. #9 – Bill Elliott
5. #43 – Richard Petty (-1)
6. #5 – Geoff Bodine (-2)
7. #71 – Dave Marcis (-2)
8. #11 – Terry Labonte (-2)
9. #52 – Jimmy Means (-3)
10. #75 – Neil Bonnett (-3)

=== Round 23: Delaware 500 ===
The Delaware 500 was held September 20 at Dover Downs International Speedway. Alan Kulwicki won the pole.

Top Ten Results

1. #15 – Ricky Rudd
2. #28 – Davey Allison
3. #75 – Neil Bonnett
4. #9 – Bill Elliott
5. #44 – Sterling Marlin
6. #5 – Geoff Bodine (-2)
7. #22 – Bobby Allison (-2)
8. #88 – Buddy Baker (-2)
9. #43 – Richard Petty (-4)
10. #17 – Darrell Waltrip (-5)

=== Round 24: Goody's 500 ===
The Goody's 500 was held September 27 at Martinsville Speedway. Geoff Bodine won the pole.

Top Ten Results

1. #17 – Darrell Waltrip
2. #3 – Dale Earnhardt
3. #11 – Terry Labonte
4. #75 – Neil Bonnett (-2)
5. #26 – Morgan Shepherd (-3)
6. #7 – Alan Kulwicki (-3)
7. #44 – Sterling Marlin (-4)
8. #22 – Bobby Allison (-5)
9. #21 – Kyle Petty (-8)
10. #18 – Dale Jarrett (-8)
- A late race caution set up an intense 3-lap sprint among Dale Earnhardt, Terry Labonte and Darrell Waltrip. On the final lap, going into turn 3, Labonte hooked Earnhardt's left rear quarter-panel, sending Earnhardt sideways and Labonte spinning towards the outside wall in turn 4. The contact enabled Waltrip to sneak underneath and grab the win.

=== Round 25: Holly Farms 400 ===
The Holly Farms 400 was held October 4 at North Wilkesboro Speedway. Bill Elliott won the pole.

Top Ten Results

1. #11 – Terry Labonte
2. #3 – Dale Earnhardt
3. #9 – Bill Elliott (-1)
4. #26 – Morgan Shepherd (-2)
5. #5 – Geoff Bodine (-2)
6. #21 – Kyle Petty (-2)
7. #7 – Alan Kulwicki (-2)
8. #8 – Bobby Hillin Jr. (-3)
9. #43 – Richard Petty (-3)
10. #27 – Rusty Wallace (-3)
- This win was Labonte's first for Junior Johnson.

=== Round 26: Oakwood Homes 500 ===
The Oakwood Homes 500 was held October 11 at Charlotte Motor Speedway. Bobby Allison won the pole for the final time in his career.

Top Ten Results

1. #9 – Bill Elliott
2. #22 – Bobby Allison
3. #44 – Sterling Marlin
4. #11 – Terry Labonte (-1)
5. #43 – Richard Petty (-1)
6. #16 – Larry Pearson (-1)
7. #83 – Lake Speed (-2)
8. #56 – Ernie Irvan (-2)
9. #17 – Darrell Waltrip (-3)
10. #21 – Kyle Petty (-4)
- A crash at lap 57 ended Neil Bonnett's season as the crash shattered his leg.
- A big chain reaction crash at lap 125 took out Geoff Bodine, Brett Bodine, Alan Kulwicki and Bobby Hillin Jr. among others.
- Jimmy Means, normally an independent driver, accepted the opportunity to run a one-off race with Hendrick Motorsports with sponsorship from Folgers; with Means starting the race in 5th position only to be taken out in a crash at lap 20 that also claimed the cars of Derrike Cope, Buddy Baker and Greg Sacks.

=== Round 27: AC Delco 500 ===
The AC Delco 500 was held October 25 at North Carolina Motor Speedway. Davey Allison won the pole.

Top Ten Results

1. #9 – Bill Elliott
2. #3 – Dale Earnhardt
3. #17 – Darrell Waltrip
4. #11 – Terry Labonte
5. #26 – Morgan Shepherd
6. #21 – Kyle Petty
7. #88 – Buddy Baker
8. #5 – Geoff Bodine (-2)
9. #55 – Phil Parsons (-2)
10. #75 – Joe Ruttman (-2)
- Dale Earnhardt clinched his 3rd NASCAR Winston Cup Championship with two races to go (he only needed a 19th place finish in this race to clinch the title). In the Bob Latford Winston Cup points system, a driver can clinch the championship with two races to go if he has a 370+ point lead over 2nd, and Earnhardt did just that by having a 515 point lead over Bill Elliott at the end of the race. Earnhardt would become the third driver in NASCAR history to clinch the Winston Cup Championship with two or more races to go, joining Richard Petty and Cale Yarborough, but as of 2018, Earnhardt is the only driver in NASCAR history to clinch the title twice with two races to go. He would accomplish it again in 1994 when he clinched his seventh and final championship with two races to go by 448 points over Rusty Wallace. In 1978, Yarborough clinched his third consecutive Winston Cup Championship with two races to go by 396 points over Bobby Allison, but in 1975, however, Petty clinched his sixth championship with four races to go because his point lead was 740+ over second. His margin was 827 points over James Hylton. Petty's championship win with four races to go is the earliest for a driver to clinch a championship in NASCAR history. Also as of 2018, this feat can never happen again due to several changes in the points system after 2003.

=== Round 28: Winston Western 500 ===
The final Winston Western 500 was held November 8 at Riverside International Raceway. Geoff Bodine won the pole.

Top Ten Results

1. #27 – Rusty Wallace
2. #35 – Benny Parsons
3. #21 – Kyle Petty
4. #43 – Richard Petty
5. #22 – Bobby Allison
6. #17 – Darrell Waltrip
7. #75 – Joe Ruttman
8. #11 – Terry Labonte
9. #71 – Dave Marcis
10. #5 – Geoff Bodine

Failed to qualify: Trevor Boys (No. 12), John Krebs (No. 66), Brad Noffsinger (No. 98), St. James Davis, Jack Sellers

=== Round 29: Atlanta Journal 500 ===
The Atlanta Journal 500 was held November 22 at Atlanta International Raceway. Bill Elliott won the pole.

Top Ten Results

1. #9 – Bill Elliott
2. #3 – Dale Earnhardt
3. #15 – Ricky Rudd
4. #22 – Bobby Allison
5. #28 – Davey Allison (-1)
6. #7 – Alan Kulwicki (-1)
7. #35 – Benny Parsons (-1)
8. #55 – Phil Parsons (-1)
9. #44 – Sterling Marlin (-1)
10. #88 – Buddy Baker (-1)
- This was the 1st time that Atlanta was the season finale (it was the season finale from 1987 to 2000).
- Dale Earnhardt officially won his third Winston Cup Championship by 489 points over Bill Elliott, the second largest point margin in Bob Latford's Winston Cup points system history. As of 2022, Richard Petty holds the record for the largest point margin, dating back to 1975, when he won his sixth championship by 722 points over Dave Marcis.

== Results and standings ==
=== Race results ===
No.	Race	Pole position	Most laps led	Winning driver	Manufacturer	Report
	Busch Clash	Bill Elliott	Bill Elliott	Bill Elliott	Ford	Report
	7-Eleven 125 #1	Bill Elliott	Unknown	Ken Schrader	Ford	Report
	7-Eleven 125 #2	Davey Allison	Benny Parsons	Benny Parsons	Chevrolet	Report
1	Daytona 500	Bill Elliott	Bill Elliott	Bill Elliott	Ford	Report
2	Goodwrench 500	Davey Allison	Dale Earnhardt	Dale Earnhardt	Chevrolet	Report
3	Miller High Life 400	Alan Kulwicki	Dale Earnhardt	Dale Earnhardt	Chevrolet	Report
4	Motorcraft Quality Parts 500	Dale Earnhardt	Dale Earnhardt	Ricky Rudd	Ford	Report
5	TranSouth 500	Ken Schrader	Dale Earnhardt	Dale Earnhardt	Chevrolet	Report
6	First Union 400	Bill Elliott	Dale Earnhardt	Dale Earnhardt	Chevrolet	Report
7	Valleydale Meats 500	Harry Gant	Bill Elliott	Dale Earnhardt	Chevrolet	Report
8	Sovran Bank 500	Morgan Shepherd	Dale Earnhardt	Dale Earnhardt	Chevrolet	Report
9	Winston 500	Bill Elliott	Davey Allison	Davey Allison	Ford	Report
	Winston Open	Brett Bodine	Buddy Baker	Buddy Baker	Oldsmobile	Report
	The Winston	Bill Elliott	Bill Elliott	Dale Earnhardt	Chevrolet	Report
10	Coca-Cola 600	Bill Elliott	Bill Elliott	Kyle Petty	Ford	Report
11	Budweiser 500	Bill Elliott	Davey Allison	Davey Allison	Ford	Report
12	Miller High Life 500	Terry Labonte	Tim Richmond	Tim Richmond	Chevrolet	Report
13	Budweiser 400	Terry Labonte	Tim Richmond	Tim Richmond	Chevrolet	Report
14	Miller American 400	Rusty Wallace	Dale Earnhardt	Dale Earnhardt	Chevrolet	Report
15	Pepsi Firecracker 400	Davey Allison	Davey Allison; Ken Schrader	Bobby Allison	Buick	Report
16	Summer 500	Tim Richmond	Dale Earnhardt	Dale Earnhardt	Chevrolet	Report
17	Talladega 500	Bill Elliott	Davey Allison	Bill Elliott	Ford	Report
18	Budweiser at The Glen	Terry Labonte	Rusty Wallace	Rusty Wallace	Pontiac	Report
19	Champion Spark Plug 400	Davey Allison	Dale Earnhardt	Bill Elliott	Ford	Report
20	Busch 500	Terry Labonte	Dale Earnhardt	Dale Earnhardt	Chevrolet	Report
21	Southern 500	Davey Allison	Dale Earnhardt	Dale Earnhardt	Chevrolet	Report
22	Wrangler Jeans Indigo 400	Alan Kulwicki	Dale Earnhardt	Dale Earnhardt	Chevrolet	Report
23	Delaware 500	Alan Kulwicki	Ricky Rudd	Ricky Rudd	Ford	Report
24	Goody's 500	Geoff Bodine	Dale Earnhardt	Darrell Waltrip	Chevrolet	Report
25	Holly Farms 400	Bill Elliott	Terry Labonte	Terry Labonte	Chevrolet	Report
26	Oakwood Homes 500	Bobby Allison	Bobby Allison	Bill Elliott	Ford	Report
27	AC Delco 500	Davey Allison	Bill Elliott	Bill Elliott	Ford	Report
28	Winston Western 500	Geoff Bodine	Geoff Bodine	Rusty Wallace	Pontiac	Report
29	Atlanta Journal 500	Bill Elliott	Bill Elliott	Bill Elliott	Ford	Report

=== Drivers' championship ===
(key) Bold – Pole position awarded by time. Italics – Pole position set by owner's points. * – Most laps led.

Pos	Driver	DAY	CAR	RCH	ATL	DAR	NWS	BRI	MAR	TAL	CLT	DOV	POC	RIV	MCH	DAY	POC	TAL	GLN	MCH	BRI	DAR	RCH	DOV	MAR	NWS	CLT	CAR	RIV	ATL	Pts
1	Dale Earnhardt	5	1*	1*	**16***	1*	1*	1	1*	4	20	4	5	7	1*	6	1*	3	8	2*	1*	1*	1	31	2*	2	12	2	30	2	4696
2	Bill Elliott	**1***	4	4	28	2	**10**	4*	6	**22**	**23***	**2**	2	5	34	12	32	**1**	28	1	9	8	4	4	11	**3**	1	1*	23	**1***	4207
3	Terry Labonte	18	8	5	4	32	8	9	5	2	6	3	**37**	**4**	28	10	6	6	**2**	33	**4**	5	8	32	3	1*	4	4	8	28	4007
4	Darrell Waltrip	8	7	20	6	10	21	12	21	11	5	7	13	30	7	4	19	4	11	17	21	10	2	10	1	12	9	3	6	18	3911
5	Rusty Wallace	41	6	3	3	20	9	16	2	6	10	17	40	41	**5**	8	14	8	1*	4	2	2	17	12	28	10	22	12	1	12	3818
6	Ricky Rudd	9	2	28	1	30	5	3	16	30	25	12	7	2	14	14	26	15	4	25	3	7	3	1*	21	13	11	31	31	3	3742
7	Kyle Petty	35	16	7	9	13	2	7	12	3	1	24	3	24	3	17	20	9	12	27	28	14	18	23	9	6	10	6	3	13	3737
8	Richard Petty	3	15	23	14	3	6	2	22	16	4	36	29	6	12	26	8	37	14	11	5	3	5	9	13	9	5	17	4	30	3708
9	Bobby Allison	6	13	9	19	28	14	23	8	39	22	25	6	8	27	1	27	12	9	7	22	26	12	7	8	17	**2***	38	5	4	3530
10	Ken Schrader	7	10	13	29	**5**	16	17	7	8	29	6	17	10	8	7	10	18	27	34	27	11	21	11	12	15	17	14	29	35	3405
11	Sterling Marlin	30	19	21	13	4	17	24	19	14	32	10	15	9	18	16	25	14	32	15	20	4	22	5	7	20	3	11	24	9	3381
12	Neil Bonnett	12	3	22	7	6	3	11	9	7	13	9	8	3	17	18	7	32	37	9	10	32	10	3	4	11	36				3352
13	Geoff Bodine	14	32	2	15	11	28	19	3	40	18	28	9	27	11	39	34	13	15	10	6	18	6	6	**20**	5	31	8	**10***	31	3328
14	Phil Parsons	11	11	15	27	9	7	20	4	31	8	22	11	11	21	15	39	29	7	14	19	12	20	29	16	14	27	9	13	8	3327
15	Alan Kulwicki	15	25	**6**	33	14	4	5	28	34	27	15	30	28	31	32	2	23	6	6	11	40	**23**	**14**	6	7	29	18	11	6	3238
16	Benny Parsons	2	34	10	2	21	15	28	26	12	26	5	33	34	9	35	4	30	5	18	26	31	16	16	23	19	38	15	2	7	3215
17	Morgan Shepherd	16	5	31	10	22	27	8	**17**	10	2	32	31	35	25	5	36	39	22	3	24	9	30	40	5	4	20	5	25	39	3099
18	Dave Marcis	34	35	8	31	33	26	27	23	13	14	8	27	16	15	3	9	22	3	35	18	16	7	15	27	30	18	22	9	32	3080
19	Bobby Hillin Jr.	13	14	11	24	23	13	26	15	5	34	26	14	13	6	13	15	40	29	13	29	6	15	39	22	8	28	33	34	14	3027
20	Michael Waltrip	22	17	12	39	19	24	13	10	25	11	21	16	32	39	19	37	17	16	20	14	19	19	18	18	16	35	19	26	38	2840
21	Davey Allison **(R)**	27	**9**	26	5	27				1*	16	1*	12		2	**20**	5	2*	17	**5**		**29**		2		26	19	**42**	14	5	2824
22	Harry Gant	31	29	25	34	7	11	**6**	27	29	24	30	32	25	13	9	30	31	18	26	8	39	25	25	14	31	33	13	28	24	2725
23	Jimmy Means	24	22	14	32	36	30	29	14	33	15	13	19	23	DNQ	29	38	36	19	37	13	22	9	22	30	21	40	20	27	29	2483
24	Buddy Baker	4	31		38	25				32	7	11	10		16	2	3	10	13	8		17		8	31		41	7		10	2373
25	Buddy Arrington			17					11		12	18	25		37	28	17		20	23	17	24	14	19	29	27	14	24	21	22	1885
26	Dale Jarrett **(R)**						12	10	29	28	38	35	35	18	20	23	12	21	36	39	12	15	27	38	10	18	34	16	17	36	1840
27	Steve Christman **(R)**	DNQ		29	22	39	31		25	19	41	37	26	DNQ	DNQ	DNQ	23	26	34	DNQ	15	21	11	17	19	29	15	32		DNQ	1727
28	Rick Wilson	37			11	34				20	30	29		14	30	30	40	16	21	12	7	28		27			30		18	27	1723
29	Cale Yarborough	10	28		8	15				37	42		4		33	24		5		40		13		36			24	37		40	1450
30	J. D. McDuffie	25	20	16	40	41	32	21	31	Wth	DNQ	23	28	37	DNQ	DNQ	DNQ	25	24	22	DNQ		DNQ	28	17	DNQ	DNQ	40		DNQ	1361
31	Lake Speed	26	12	DNQ	35	31				9	3				10	40		7		16		30					7			41	1345
32	Brett Bodine						RL				21	14	34	38	22	11	22	38		21		20		13			32	41		15	1271
33	Greg Sacks	20	30		37	26				26	36		36		29	25	35		Wth	19		38			24		42	27		26	1200
34	Eddie Bierschwale	36	18	18	42	16	18	25	24	18	28				19	33				DNQ		25		37			DNQ	23			1162
35	Rodney Combs **(R)**	19				37	20					20	20		23	31	16	19	23	31	23	27				DNQ	37				1098
36	Tim Richmond												1*	1*	4	22	**29**	11	10	29		Wth									1063
37	Derrike Cope **(R)**	33			36				13		37		38		41		31		31	38	16						39		20		797
38	Mark Stahl	38	33		30	DNQ				17	DNQ					37		33									23	28		21	687
39	Bobby Wawak	DNQ	27	32	DNQ	29				Wth	19		24		DNQ	DNQ				32		23					DNQ	36			638
40	D. K. Ulrich		26	30	23	18		15				34	DNQ										26								625
41	Ken Ragan	17			26					21										30							26			23	549
42	Connie Saylor	40			41	24				23	33				38	DNQ	18	DNQ		DNQ		34					16	25		DNQ	486
43	Jerry Cranmer **(R)**		23	24			22	22	20																						482
44	Chet Fillip	39	24							41	DNQ			21		21		20													480
45	Trevor Boys	23								Wth			18				11		38	DNQ		36	24	33		24	25	21	DNQ	DNQ	460
46	Mike Potter				25	DNQ		18				33	DNQ		DNQ		DNQ		30		DNQ	33		35							456
47	Slick Johnson			19		12	19	14	30	15															25	32					444
48	Ron Bouchard	32	36		12	8				38																					440
49	H. B. Bailey				18	17									40					DNQ		35					DNQ			19	428
50	A. J. Foyt	42			20											38		35									21			37	409
51	Larry Pearson						25				31																6			25	401
52	Charlie Rudolph											19	22		DNQ		13			36											382
53	Ernie Irvan																						29		15	22	8		19		324
54	Jim Sauter	DNQ									9				24					24							DNQ				320
55	Brad Teague										40					41					25						13			17	319
56	Ronnie Thomas	DNQ						30													30					25		26			319
57	David Simko	DNQ													26					28				30				35			295
58	Tommy Ellis	DNQ	38	27	17	40																									286
59	Hut Stricklin																									28		29		16	270
60	Chad Little													15															15		236
61	David Sosebee	28	39		21																										225
62	Randy Baker										17																DNQ			20	215
63	Jocko Maggiacomo	DNQ															24		35	DNQ									37		201
64	Ed Pimm	DNQ								27						34														42	185
65	Jim Robinson													36															12		182
66	Harry Goularte													20															32		170
67	Charlie Baker	DNQ	21		QL								DNQ														DNQ	DNQ		33	164
68	Jimmy Horton									Wth			21				33							QL						DNQ	164
69	Hershel McGriff													12															42		164
70	George Follmer													40															16		163
71	Ruben Garcia													19															39		152
72	Ron Shephard			DNQ								39	DNQ				21														146
73	Rick McCray													26															35		143
74	Dave Pletcher															36		27		DNQ											137
75	Bobby Gerhart												39		DNQ		28							DNQ		DNQ				DNQ	125
76	Bill Schmitt													33															36		119
77	Jerry Holden		42		DNQ							DNQ			DNQ			28													116
78	Jesse Samples Jr.		41				29				DNQ																				116
79	Jim Fitzgerald													17																	112
80	Jonathan Lee Edwards	DNQ				35																37					DNQ				110
81	James Hylton		37			38				Wth			DNQ																		101
82	Bobby Baker						23																								94
83	Rick Knoop									24									25					20							91
84	Rick Jeffrey														DNQ					DNQ				24						DNQ	91
85	Roy Smith													39															40		89
86	Tom Retsell																		26												85
87	D. Wayne Strout																						DNQ	26		DNQ		DNQ			85
88	Gary Fedewa											27			DNQ																82
89	Doug French																						28								79
90	John Krebs													29															DNQ		76
91	Tom Sneva	29																													76
92	Curtis Markham											38													26			30		34	73
93	Jim Bown												23	31																	70
94	Jerry Bowman											31																			70
95	Ken Bouchard														32																67
96	Patty Moise																		33												64
97	Kirk Bryant																										DNQ	34			61
98	Mark Gibson																							34							61
99	Jeff Swindell	DNQ																34													61
100	Phil Barkdoll	DNQ								35						DNQ											DNQ				58
101	Donny Paul															35															58
102	Butch Miller														36													DNQ		DNQ	46
103	Phil Good											DNQ							39				DNQ								46
104	Mark Martin										39																				46
105	Patrick Latimer		40																												43
106	Chuck Schroedel																		40												43
107	Joe Ruttman									36			QL	QL														10	7	11	
108	Larry Pollard											16				27							13			23					
109	Tony Spanos			DNQ				DNQ	18		DNQ					DNQ					DNQ						DNQ				
110	Larry Caudill																							21							
111	Ronnie Sanders	21								DNQ																					
112	Ron Esau													22																	
113	Irv Hoerr																												22		
114	Delma Cowart	DNQ								Wth						DNQ		24									DNQ			DNQ	
115	Rick Hendrick																												33		
116	Allan Grice										35																				
117	Tommy Kendall																												38		
118	Glen Steurer																												41		
119	Dick McCabe	DNQ																													
120	Joe Booher	DNQ																													
121	Grant Adcox	DNQ																													
122	Steve Moore	DNQ																													
123	Ralph Jones	DNQ																													
124	Blackie Wangerin	DNQ								DNQ						DNQ															
125	Donnie Allison	DNQ									DNQ																				
126	Eddie Drury			DNQ								DNQ											DNQ	Wth							
127	Clark James			DNQ																						DNQ					
128	Bill Hollar			DNQ																						DNQ					
129	Joe Millikan					DNQ																									
130	Graeme Crosby										DNQ																				
131	Johnny Coy Jr.											DNQ																			
132	Billy Fulcher											DNQ																			
133	Tommie Crozier												DNQ																		
134	Roman Calczynski													DNQ																	
135	Ray Kelly													DNQ																	
136	St. James Davis													DNQ															DNQ		
137	Jack Sellers													DNQ															DNQ		
138	Rick Hood														DNQ					DNQ											
139	Ed Sutton																DNQ														
140	Jerry Ward																							DNQ							
141	George Wiltshire																							DNQ							
142	Lynn Gibson																									DNQ					
143	Glenn Moffat																									DNQ					
144	Graham Taylor																									DNQ					
145	Joe Dan Bailey																									DNQ					
146	Ronnie Adams																									DNQ					
147	Kevin Evans																									DNQ					
148	Brandon Baker																									DNQ					
149	Philip Duffie																										DNQ			DNQ	
150	Reno Fontana																												DNQ		
151	Bob Howard																												DNQ		
152	Brad Noffsinger																												DNQ		
153	Doug Wolfgang						Wth																								
154	Robbie Faggart										Wth																				
155	Bob Keselowski														Wth																
156	Paul Newman																		Wth												
Pos	Driver	DAY	CAR	RCH	ATL	DAR	NWS	BRI	MAR	TAL	CLT	DOV	POC	RIV	MCH	DAY	POC	TAL	GLN	MCH	BRI	DAR	RCH	DOV	MAR	NWS	CLT	CAR	RIV	ATL	Pts

== Rookie of the Year ==
Davey Allison won the Rookie of the Year award in 1987, winning two races for Harry Ranier after making an aborted attempt at the award the previous season. He was followed by Dale Jarrett, who had two top-ten finishes, and Steve Christman, who did not race in NASCAR again following the season. The other contenders were Rodney Combs, Derrike Cope, and Jerry Cranmer, all running incomplete schedules.

== See also ==
- 1987 NASCAR Busch Series
- 1987 NASCAR Winston West Series
- 1987 NASCAR Busch Grand National North Series
