= 1987 Wrangler Jeans Indigo 400 =

22nd race of the 1987 NASCAR Winston Cup Series

Race details
- Race 22 of 29 in the 1987 NASCAR Winston Cup Series
- The 1987 Wrangler Jeans Indigo 400 program cover, featuring Richard Petty.
- Date: September 13, 1987
- Official name: 30th Annual Wrangler Jeans Indigo 400
- Location: Richmond, Virginia, Richmond Fairgrounds Raceway
- Course: Permanent racing facility
- Course length: 0.542 miles (0.872 km)
- Distance: 400 laps, 216.8 mi (348.905 km)
- Scheduled distance: 400 laps, 216.8 mi (348.905 km)
- Average speed: 67.074 miles per hour (107.945 km/h)
- Attendance: 30,000

Pole position
Driver	Alan Kulwicki	AK Racing
- Time: 20.746

Most laps led
Driver	Dale Earnhardt	Richard Childress Racing
- Laps: 220

Winner
No. 3	Dale Earnhardt	Richard Childress Racing

Television in the United States
- Network: SETN
- Announcers: Eli Gold, Jerry Punch

Radio in the United States
- Radio: Motor Racing Network

The 1987 Wrangler Jeans Indigo 400 was the 22nd stock car race of the 1987 NASCAR Winston Cup Series season and the 30th iteration of the event. The race was held on Sunday, September 13, 1987, before an audience of 30,000 in Richmond, Virginia, at Richmond Fairgrounds Raceway, a 0.542 miles (0.872 km) D-shaped oval. The race took the scheduled 400 laps to complete.

Coming back from a penalty and avoiding several wrecks, Richard Childress Racing's Dale Earnhardt managed to dominate the late stages of the race, leading 156 of the final 219 laps to take his 31st career NASCAR Winston Cup Series victory and his 11th and final victory of the season. With the victory, Earnhardt was able to increase his driver's championship lead over Bill Elliott to 608 points, a lead that was seen as virtually insurmountable with seven races left in the season. To fill out the top three, Hendrick Motorsports' Darrell Waltrip and Bud Moore Engineering's Ricky Rudd finished second and third, respectively.

== Background ==
Richmond International Raceway (RIR) is a 3/4-mile (1.2 km), D-shaped, asphalt race track located just outside Richmond, Virginia in Henrico County. It hosts the Monster Energy NASCAR Cup Series and Xfinity Series. Known as "America's premier short track", it formerly hosted a NASCAR Camping World Truck Series race, an IndyCar Series race, and two USAC sprint car races.

=== Entry list ===
- (R) denotes rookie driver.

#	Driver	Team	Make	Sponsor
3	Dale Earnhardt	Richard Childress Racing	Chevrolet	Wrangler
5	Geoff Bodine	Hendrick Motorsports	Chevrolet	Levi Garrett
6	D. K. Ulrich	U.S. Racing	Chevrolet	U.S. Racing
7	Alan Kulwicki	AK Racing	Ford	Zerex
8	Bobby Hillin Jr.	Stavola Brothers Racing	Buick	Miller American
9	Bill Elliott	Melling Racing	Ford	Coors
09	Doug French	Caragias Racing	Buick	Caragias Racing
11	Terry Labonte	Junior Johnson & Associates	Chevrolet	Budweiser
12	Larry Pollard	Hamby Racing	Oldsmobile	Hamby Racing
15	Ricky Rudd	Bud Moore Engineering	Ford	Motorcraft Quality Parts
17	Darrell Waltrip	Hendrick Motorsports	Chevrolet	Tide
18	Dale Jarrett (R)	Freedlander Motorsports	Chevrolet	Freedlander Financial
21	Kyle Petty	Wood Brothers Racing	Ford	Citgo
22	Bobby Allison	Stavola Brothers Racing	Buick	Miller American
26	Morgan Shepherd	King Racing	Buick	Quaker State
27	Rusty Wallace	Blue Max Racing	Pontiac	Kodiak
30	Michael Waltrip	Bahari Racing	Chevrolet	All Pro Auto Parts
33	Harry Gant	Mach 1 Racing	Chevrolet	Skoal Bandit
35	Benny Parsons	Hendrick Motorsports	Chevrolet	Folgers Decaf
43	Richard Petty	Petty Enterprises	Pontiac	STP
44	Sterling Marlin	Hagan Racing	Oldsmobile	Piedmont Airlines
52	Jimmy Means	Jimmy Means Racing	Pontiac	Eureka
55	Phil Parsons	Jackson Bros. Motorsports	Oldsmobile	Skoal Classic
56	Ernie Irvan	Reno Enterprises	Chevrolet	Dale Earnhardt Chevrolet
62	Steve Christman (R)	Winkle Motorsports	Pontiac	AC Spark Plug
64	Trevor Boys	Langley Racing	Ford	Sunny King Ford
67	Buddy Arrington	Arrington Racing	Ford	Pannill Sweatshirts
70	J. D. McDuffie	McDuffie Racing	Pontiac	Rumple Furniture
71	Dave Marcis	Marcis Auto Racing	Chevrolet	Lifebuoy
72	Eddie Drury	Drury Racing	Chevrolet	Drury Racing
75	Neil Bonnett	RahMoc Enterprises	Pontiac	Valvoline
76	Phil Good	Good Racing	Ford	Good Racing
90	Ken Schrader	Donlavey Racing	Ford	Red Baron Frozen Pizza
97	D. Wayne Strout	Strout Racing	Oldsmobile	Strout Racing

== Qualifying ==
Qualifying was split into two rounds. The first round was held on Friday, September 11, at 3:00 PM EST. Each driver had one lap to set a time. During the first round, the top 20 drivers in the round were guaranteed a starting spot in the race. If a driver was not able to guarantee a spot in the first round, they had the option to scrub their time from the first round and try and run a faster lap time in a second round qualifying run, held on Saturday, September 12, at 11:30 AM EST. As with the first round, each driver had one lap to set a time. For this specific race, positions 21-30 were decided on time, and depending on who needed it, a select amount of positions were given to cars who had not otherwise qualified but were high enough in owner's points; up to two were given.

Alan Kulwicki, driving for his own AK Racing team, managed to win the pole, setting a time of 20.746 and an average speed of 94.052 miles per hour (151.362 km/h) in the first round.

Four drivers failed to qualify.

=== Full qualifying results ===
Pos.	#	Driver	Team	Make	Time	Speed
1	7	Alan Kulwicki	AK Racing	Ford	20.746	94.052
2	17	Darrell Waltrip	Hendrick Motorsports	Chevrolet	20.761	93.984
3	11	Terry Labonte	Junior Johnson & Associates	Chevrolet	20.796	93.826
4	33	Harry Gant	Mach 1 Racing	Chevrolet	20.813	93.749
5	21	Kyle Petty	Wood Brothers Racing	Ford	20.835	93.650
6	15	Ricky Rudd	Bud Moore Engineering	Ford	20.864	93.520
7	30	Michael Waltrip	Bahari Racing	Chevrolet	20.901	93.354
8	3	Dale Earnhardt	Richard Childress Racing	Chevrolet	20.907	93.328
9	27	Rusty Wallace	Blue Max Racing	Pontiac	20.944	93.163
10	5	Geoff Bodine	Hendrick Motorsports	Chevrolet	20.947	93.149
11	26	Morgan Shepherd	King Racing	Buick	20.953	93.123
12	35	Benny Parsons	Hendrick Motorsports	Chevrolet	21.022	92.817
13	75	Neil Bonnett	RahMoc Enterprises	Pontiac	21.033	92.769
14	44	Sterling Marlin	Hagan Racing	Oldsmobile	21.048	92.702
15	22	Bobby Allison	Stavola Brothers Racing	Buick	21.053	92.680
16	9	Bill Elliott	Melling Racing	Ford	21.056	92.667
17	43	Richard Petty	Petty Enterprises	Pontiac	21.061	92.645
18	18	Dale Jarrett (R)	Freedlander Motorsports	Chevrolet	21.150	92.255
19	90	Ken Schrader	Donlavey Racing	Ford	21.151	92.251
20	56	Ernie Irvan	Reno Enterprises	Chevrolet	21.183	92.112
Failed to lock in Round 1
21	71	Dave Marcis	Marcis Auto Racing	Chevrolet	21.195	92.059
22	55	Phil Parsons	Jackson Bros. Motorsports	Oldsmobile	21.201	92.033
23	8	Bobby Hillin Jr.	Stavola Brothers Racing	Buick	21.247	91.834
24	62	Steve Christman (R)	Winkle Motorsports	Pontiac	21.287	91.662
25	52	Jimmy Means	Jimmy Means Racing	Pontiac	21.359	91.353
26	6	D. K. Ulrich	U.S. Racing	Chevrolet	21.367	91.318
27	67	Buddy Arrington	Arrington Racing	Ford	21.387	91.233
28	12	Larry Pollard	Hamby Racing	Oldsmobile	21.443	90.995
29	64	Trevor Boys	Langley Racing	Ford	21.462	90.914
30	09	Doug French	Caragias Racing	Buick	21.573	90.446
Failed to qualify
31	76	Phil Good	Good Racing	Ford	-*	-*
32	97	D. Wayne Strout	Strout Racing	Oldsmobile	-*	-*
33	70	J. D. McDuffie	McDuffie Racing	Pontiac	-*	-*
34	72	Eddie Drury	Drury Racing	Chevrolet	-*	-*
Official first round qualifying results
Official starting lineup

== Race results ==
Fin	St	#	Driver	Team	Make	Laps	Led	Status	Pts	Winnings
1	8	3	Dale Earnhardt	Richard Childress Racing	Chevrolet	400	220	running	185	$44,950
2	2	17	Darrell Waltrip	Hendrick Motorsports	Chevrolet	400	86	running	175	$22,680
3	6	15	Ricky Rudd	Bud Moore Engineering	Ford	400	0	running	165	$20,050
4	16	9	Bill Elliott	Melling Racing	Ford	400	0	running	160	$14,675
5	17	43	Richard Petty	Petty Enterprises	Pontiac	399	0	running	155	$10,180
6	10	5	Geoff Bodine	Hendrick Motorsports	Chevrolet	398	0	running	150	$9,170
7	21	71	Dave Marcis	Marcis Auto Racing	Chevrolet	398	0	running	146	$8,280
8	3	11	Terry Labonte	Junior Johnson & Associates	Chevrolet	398	1	running	147	$10,230
9	25	52	Jimmy Means	Jimmy Means Racing	Pontiac	397	21	running	143	$7,300
10	13	75	Neil Bonnett	RahMoc Enterprises	Pontiac	397	0	running	134	$6,930
11	24	62	Steve Christman (R)	Winkle Motorsports	Pontiac	391	0	running	130	$2,850
12	15	22	Bobby Allison	Stavola Brothers Racing	Buick	391	0	running	127	$7,575
13	28	12	Larry Pollard	Hamby Racing	Oldsmobile	391	0	running	0	$4,755
14	27	67	Buddy Arrington	Arrington Racing	Ford	386	0	running	121	$4,615
15	23	8	Bobby Hillin Jr.	Stavola Brothers Racing	Buick	386	0	running	118	$7,675
16	12	35	Benny Parsons	Hendrick Motorsports	Chevrolet	382	0	running	115	$9,430
17	9	27	Rusty Wallace	Blue Max Racing	Pontiac	373	56	crash	117	$8,155
18	5	21	Kyle Petty	Wood Brothers Racing	Ford	346	0	axle	109	$7,130
19	7	30	Michael Waltrip	Bahari Racing	Chevrolet	309	0	running	106	$4,090
20	22	55	Phil Parsons	Jackson Bros. Motorsports	Oldsmobile	294	15	crash	108	$2,565
21	19	90	Ken Schrader	Donlavey Racing	Ford	294	0	running	100	$3,790
22	14	44	Sterling Marlin	Hagan Racing	Oldsmobile	289	0	crash	97	$3,585
23	1	7	Alan Kulwicki	AK Racing	Ford	241	1	crash	99	$8,810
24	29	64	Trevor Boys	Langley Racing	Ford	222	0	engine	0	$3,215
25	4	33	Harry Gant	Mach 1 Racing	Chevrolet	140	0	crash	88	$3,320
26	26	6	D. K. Ulrich	U.S. Racing	Chevrolet	112	0	engine	85	$3,175
27	18	18	Dale Jarrett (R)	Freedlander Motorsports	Chevrolet	109	0	crash	82	$2,430
28	30	09	Doug French	Caragias Racing	Buick	75	0	crash	79	$895
29	20	56	Ernie Irvan	Reno Enterprises	Chevrolet	35	0	overheating	76	$860
30	11	26	Morgan Shepherd	King Racing	Buick	12	0	crash	73	$2,325
Failed to qualify
31		76	Phil Good	Good Racing	Ford					
32		97	D. Wayne Strout	Strout Racing	Oldsmobile					
33		70	J. D. McDuffie	McDuffie Racing	Pontiac					
34		72	Eddie Drury	Drury Racing	Chevrolet					
Official race results

== Standings after the race ==
Drivers' Championship standings

	Pos	Driver	Points
	1	Dale Earnhardt	3,706
	2	Bill Elliott	3,098 (-608)
	3	Terry Labonte	3,019 (-687)
	4	Rusty Wallace	2,942 (–764)
	5	Darrell Waltrip	2,898 (–808)
	6	Ricky Rudd	2,878 (–828)
	7	Neil Bonnett	2,842 (–864)
1	8	Richard Petty	2,808 (–898)
1	9	Kyle Petty	2,772 (–934)
	10	Ken Schrader	2,658 (–1,048)
Official driver's standings

- Note: Only the first 10 positions are included for the driver standings.

Previous race: 1987 Southern 500	NASCAR Winston Cup Series; 1987 season	Next race: 1987 Delaware 500
