= 1987 TranSouth 500 =

Fifth race of the 1987 NASCAR Winston Cup Series

Race details
- Race 5 of 29 in the 1987 NASCAR Winston Cup Series
- The 1987 TranSouth 500 program cover, featuring Dale Earnhardt.
- Date: March 29, 1987
- Official name: 31st Annual TranSouth 500
- Location: Darlington, South Carolina, Darlington Raceway
- Course: Permanent racing facility
- Course length: 1.366 miles (2.198 km)
- Distance: 367 laps, 501.322 mi (806.799 km)
- Scheduled distance: 367 laps, 501.322 mi (806.799 km)
- Average speed: 122.54 miles per hour (197.21 km/h)
- Attendance: 60,000

Pole position
Driver	Ken Schrader	Donlavey Racing
- Time: 31.048

Most laps led
Driver	Dale Earnhardt	Richard Childress Racing
- Laps: 239

Winner
No. 3	Dale Earnhardt	Richard Childress Racing

Television in the United States
- Network: ESPN
- Announcers: Larry Nuber, Jerry Punch

Radio in the United States
- Radio: Motor Racing Network

The 1987 TranSouth 500 was the fifth stock car race of the 1987 NASCAR Winston Cup Series season and the 31st iteration of the event. The race was held on Sunday, March 29, 1987, before an audience of 60,000 in Darlington, South Carolina, at Darlington Raceway, a 1.366 miles (2.198 km) permanent egg-shaped oval racetrack. The race took the scheduled 367 laps to complete.

Taking advantage of a misfortunate Bill Elliott, who ran out of gas on the final lap, Richard Childress Racing's Dale Earnhardt, who had been the dominant car of the race, passed Elliott with half a lap remaining to take his 23rd career NASCAR Winston Cup Series victory and his third victory of the season. To fill out the top three, the aforementioned Bill Elliott and owner-driver Richard Petty finished second and third, respectively.

== Background ==
The layout of Darlington Raceway, the venue where the race was held.

Darlington Raceway is a race track built for NASCAR racing located near Darlington, South Carolina. It is nicknamed "The Lady in Black" and "The Track Too Tough to Tame" by many NASCAR fans and drivers and advertised as "A NASCAR Tradition." It is of a unique, somewhat egg-shaped design, an oval with the ends of very different configurations, a condition which supposedly arose from the proximity of one end of the track to a minnow pond the owner refused to relocate. This situation makes it very challenging for the crews to set up their cars' handling in a way that is effective at both ends.

=== Entry list ===
- (R) denotes rookie driver.

#	Driver	Team	Make
1	Ron Bouchard	Ellington Racing	Chevrolet
3	Dale Earnhardt	Richard Childress Racing	Chevrolet
4	Rick Wilson	Morgan–McClure Motorsports	Oldsmobile
5	Geoff Bodine	Hendrick Motorsports	Chevrolet
6	D. K. Ulrich	U.S. Racing	Chevrolet
7	Alan Kulwicki	AK Racing	Ford
8	Bobby Hillin Jr.	Stavola Brothers Racing	Buick
9	Bill Elliott	Melling Racing	Ford
10	Rodney Combs	DiGard Motorsports	Chevrolet
11	Terry Labonte	Junior Johnson & Associates	Chevrolet
12	Slick Johnson	Hamby Racing	Chevrolet
15	Ricky Rudd	Bud Moore Engineering	Ford
17	Darrell Waltrip	Hendrick Motorsports	Chevrolet
18	Tommy Ellis	Freedlander Motorsports	Chevrolet
21	Kyle Petty	Wood Brothers Racing	Ford
22	Bobby Allison	Stavola Brothers Racing	Buick
26	Morgan Shepherd	King Racing	Buick
27	Rusty Wallace	Blue Max Racing	Pontiac
28	Davey Allison (R)	Ranier-Lundy Racing	Ford
29	Cale Yarborough	Cale Yarborough Motorsports	Oldsmobile
30	Michael Waltrip	Bahari Racing	Chevrolet
32	Jonathan Lee Edwards	Edwards Racing	Chevrolet
33	Harry Gant	Mach 1 Racing	Chevrolet
35	Benny Parsons	Hendrick Motorsports	Chevrolet
36	H. B. Bailey	Bailey Racing	Pontiac
37	Joe Millikan	Beahr Racing	Ford
43	Richard Petty	Petty Enterprises	Pontiac
44	Sterling Marlin	Hagan Racing	Oldsmobile
48	James Hylton	Hylton Motorsports	Chevrolet
50	Greg Sacks	Dingman Brothers Racing	Pontiac
52	Jimmy Means	Jimmy Means Racing	Pontiac
55	Phil Parsons	Jackson Bros. Motorsports	Oldsmobile
62	Steve Christman (R)	Winkle Motorsports	Pontiac
64	Connie Saylor	Langley Racing	Ford
67	Eddie Bierschwale	Arrington Racing	Ford
70	J. D. McDuffie	McDuffie Racing	Pontiac
71	Dave Marcis	Marcis Auto Racing	Chevrolet
75	Neil Bonnett	RahMoc Enterprises	Pontiac
77	Bobby Wawak	Ragan Racing	Ford
81	Mike Potter	Fillip Racing	Ford
82	Mark Stahl	Stahl Racing	Ford
83	Lake Speed	Speed Racing	Oldsmobile
88	Buddy Baker	Baker–Schiff Racing	Oldsmobile
90	Ken Schrader	Donlavey Racing	Ford

== Qualifying ==
Qualifying was split into two rounds. The first round was held on Thursday, March 26, at 3:00 PM EST. Each driver had one lap to set a time. During the first round, the top 20 drivers in the round were guaranteed a starting spot in the race. If a driver was not able to guarantee a spot in the first round, they had the option to scrub their time from the first round and try and run a faster lap time in a second round qualifying run, held on Friday, March 27, at 2:00 PM EST. As with the first round, each driver would have one lap to set a time. For this specific race, positions 21-40 would be decided on time, and depending on who needed it, a select amount of positions were given to cars who had not otherwise qualified but were high enough in owner's points; up to two were given.

Ken Schrader, driving for Donlavey Racing, managed to win the pole, setting a time of 31.048 and an average speed of 158.387 miles per hour (254.899 km/h) in the first round.

Three drivers failed to qualify.

=== Full qualifying results ===
Pos.	#	Driver	Team	Make	Time	Speed
1	90	Ken Schrader	Donlavey Racing	Ford	31.048	158.387
2	3	Dale Earnhardt	Richard Childress Racing	Chevrolet	31.110	158.071
3	9	Bill Elliott	Melling Racing	Ford	31.151	157.863
4	35	Benny Parsons	Hendrick Motorsports	Chevrolet	31.157	157.833
5	28	Davey Allison (R)	Ranier-Lundy Racing	Ford	31.165	157.792
6	27	Rusty Wallace	Blue Max Racing	Pontiac	31.318	157.022
7	5	Geoff Bodine	Hendrick Motorsports	Chevrolet	31.324	156.991
8	22	Bobby Allison	Stavola Brothers Racing	Buick	31.381	156.706
9	83	Lake Speed	Speed Racing	Oldsmobile	31.395	156.636
10	15	Ricky Rudd	Bud Moore Engineering	Ford	31.434	156.442
11	88	Buddy Baker	Baker–Schiff Racing	Oldsmobile	31.461	156.308
12	33	Harry Gant	Mach 1 Racing	Chevrolet	31.475	156.238
13	75	Neil Bonnett	RahMoc Enterprises	Pontiac	31.479	156.218
14	11	Terry Labonte	Junior Johnson & Associates	Chevrolet	31.488	156.174
15	55	Phil Parsons	Jackson Bros. Motorsports	Oldsmobile	31.572	155.758
16	44	Sterling Marlin	Hagan Racing	Oldsmobile	31.709	155.085
17	71	Dave Marcis	Marcis Auto Racing	Chevrolet	31.729	154.988
18	26	Morgan Shepherd	King Racing	Buick	31.740	154.934
19	17	Darrell Waltrip	Hendrick Motorsports	Chevrolet	31.762	154.827
20	8	Bobby Hillin Jr.	Stavola Brothers Racing	Buick	31.792	154.680
Failed to lock in Round 1
21	29	Cale Yarborough	Cale Yarborough Motorsports	Oldsmobile	31.644	155.404
22	4	Rick Wilson	Morgan–McClure Motorsports	Oldsmobile	31.808	154.603
23	21	Kyle Petty	Wood Brothers Racing	Ford	31.824	154.525
24	43	Richard Petty	Petty Enterprises	Pontiac	31.836	154.467
25	1	Ron Bouchard	Ellington Racing	Chevrolet	31.872	154.292
26	18	Tommy Ellis	Freedlander Motorsports	Chevrolet	31.938	153.973
27	50	Greg Sacks	Dingman Brothers Racing	Pontiac	32.005	153.651
28	67	Eddie Bierschwale	Arrington Racing	Ford	32.025	153.555
29	10	Rodney Combs	DiGard Motorsports	Chevrolet	32.057	153.402
30	30	Michael Waltrip	Bahari Racing	Chevrolet	32.096	153.215
31	52	Jimmy Means	Jimmy Means Racing	Pontiac	32.224	152.607
32	6	D. K. Ulrich	U.S. Racing	Chevrolet	32.286	152.314
33	64	Connie Saylor	Langley Racing	Ford	32.289	152.300
34	7	Alan Kulwicki	AK Racing	Ford	32.297	152.262
35	36	H. B. Bailey	Bailey Racing	Pontiac	32.306	152.219
36	12	Slick Johnson	Hamby Racing	Chevrolet	32.423	151.670
37	77	Bobby Wawak	Ragan Racing	Chevrolet	32.465	151.474
38	70	J. D. McDuffie	McDuffie Racing	Pontiac	32.469	151.455
39	62	Steve Christman (R)	Winkle Motorsports	Pontiac	32.641	150.657
40	32	Jonathan Lee Edwards	Edwards Racing	Chevrolet	32.707	150.353
Provisional
41	48	James Hylton	Hylton Motorsports	Chevrolet	32.785	149.995
Failed to qualify
42	81	Mike Potter	Fillip Racing	Ford	33.200	148.120
43	37	Joe Millikan	Beahr Racing	Ford	33.219	148.036
44	82	Mark Stahl	Stahl Racing	Ford	33.728	145.802
Official first round qualifying results
Official starting lineup

== Race results ==
Fin	St	#	Driver	Team	Make	Laps	Led	Status	Pts	Winnings
1	2	3	Dale Earnhardt	Richard Childress Racing	Chevrolet	367	239	running	185	$52,985
2	3	9	Bill Elliott	Melling Racing	Ford	367	41	running	175	$31,485
3	24	43	Richard Petty	Petty Enterprises	Pontiac	367	1	running	170	$20,450
4	16	44	Sterling Marlin	Hagan Racing	Oldsmobile	367	5	running	165	$17,105
5	1	90	Ken Schrader	Donlavey Racing	Ford	367	19	running	160	$16,650
6	13	75	Neil Bonnett	RahMoc Enterprises	Pontiac	367	7	running	155	$10,065
7	12	33	Harry Gant	Mach 1 Racing	Chevrolet	366	0	running	146	$9,295
8	25	1	Ron Bouchard	Ellington Racing	Chevrolet	366	0	running	142	$4,810
9	15	55	Phil Parsons	Jackson Bros. Motorsports	Oldsmobile	366	0	running	138	$4,305
10	19	17	Darrell Waltrip	Hendrick Motorsports	Chevrolet	366	1	running	139	$5,180
11	7	5	Geoff Bodine	Hendrick Motorsports	Chevrolet	364	0	running	130	$10,525
12	36	12	Slick Johnson	Hamby Racing	Chevrolet	363	0	running	127	$7,755
13	23	21	Kyle Petty	Wood Brothers Racing	Ford	362	0	running	124	$6,815
14	34	7	Alan Kulwicki	AK Racing	Ford	361	0	running	121	$7,375
15	21	29	Cale Yarborough	Cale Yarborough Motorsports	Oldsmobile	354	0	running	118	$3,715
16	28	67	Eddie Bierschwale	Arrington Racing	Ford	349	0	running	115	$5,800
17	35	36	H. B. Bailey	Bailey Racing	Pontiac	348	0	running	112	$2,485
18	32	6	D. K. Ulrich	U.S. Racing	Chevrolet	347	0	running	109	$5,420
19	30	30	Michael Waltrip	Bahari Racing	Chevrolet	338	0	running	106	$5,040
20	6	27	Rusty Wallace	Blue Max Racing	Pontiac	322	0	overheating	103	$10,075
21	4	35	Benny Parsons	Hendrick Motorsports	Chevrolet	314	0	running	100	$11,275
22	18	26	Morgan Shepherd	King Racing	Buick	312	0	running	97	$4,785
23	20	8	Bobby Hillin Jr.	Stavola Brothers Racing	Buick	307	0	overheating	94	$8,900
24	33	64	Connie Saylor	Langley Racing	Ford	291	0	running	91	$4,570
25	11	88	Buddy Baker	Baker–Schiff Racing	Oldsmobile	259	40	crash	93	$2,585
26	27	50	Greg Sacks	Dingman Brothers Racing	Pontiac	258	0	engine	85	$1,680
27	5	28	Davey Allison (R)	Ranier-Lundy Racing	Ford	214	0	crash	82	$2,375
28	8	22	Bobby Allison	Stavola Brothers Racing	Buick	214	1	crash	84	$8,580
29	37	77	Bobby Wawak	Ragan Racing	Chevrolet	168	0	crash	76	$1,535
30	10	15	Ricky Rudd	Bud Moore Engineering	Ford	144	12	crash	78	$9,885
31	9	83	Lake Speed	Speed Racing	Oldsmobile	144	0	crash	70	$1,445
32	14	11	Terry Labonte	Junior Johnson & Associates	Chevrolet	143	0	crash	67	$10,200
33	17	71	Dave Marcis	Marcis Auto Racing	Chevrolet	131	1	steering	69	$4,100
34	22	4	Rick Wilson	Morgan–McClure Motorsports	Oldsmobile	118	0	head gasket	61	$1,330
35	40	32	Jonathan Lee Edwards	Edwards Racing	Chevrolet	104	0	fuel pump	58	$1,300
36	31	52	Jimmy Means	Jimmy Means Racing	Pontiac	85	0	engine	55	$3,270
37	29	10	Rodney Combs	DiGard Motorsports	Chevrolet	38	0	ignition	52	$1,740
38	41	48	James Hylton	Hylton Motorsports	Chevrolet	14	0	ignition	49	$1,225
39	39	62	Steve Christman (R)	Winkle Motorsports	Pontiac	8	0	crash	46	$1,210
40	26	18	Tommy Ellis	Freedlander Motorsports	Chevrolet	3	0	quit	43	$1,180
41	38	70	J. D. McDuffie	McDuffie Racing	Pontiac	1	0	engine	40	$1,180
Official race results

== Standings after the race ==
Drivers' Championship standings

	Pos	Driver	Points
	1	Dale Earnhardt	840
	2	Bill Elliott	769 (-71)
4	3	Neil Bonnett	700 (-140)
1	4	Darrell Waltrip	690 (–150)
5	5	Richard Petty	678 (–162)
5	6	Ken Schrader	655 (–185)
4	7	Ricky Rudd	650 (–190)
2	8	Benny Parsons	650 (–190)
5	9	Terry Labonte	643 (–197)
1	10	Rusty Wallace	628 (–212)
Official driver's standings

- Note: Only the first 10 positions are included for the driver standings.

Previous race: 1987 Motorcraft Quality Parts 500	NASCAR Winston Cup Series; 1987 season	Next race: 1987 First Union 400
