= Jim Fitzgerald (racing driver) =

American racing driver

- Born: December 1, 1921; Pittsburgh, Pennsylvania, U.S.
- Died: November 8, 1987 (aged 65); St. Petersburg, Florida, U.S.
- Cause of death: Racing accident
- Achievements: 1970 SCCA D Production Champion; 1984 SCCA GT-1 Champion

NASCAR Cup Series career
- 2 races run over 2 years
- Best finish: 79th (1987)
- First race: 1986 Winston Western 500 (Riverside)
- Last race: 1987 Budweiser 400 (Riverside)
Wins	Top tens	Poles
0	0	0

James Joyce Fitzgerald (December 1, 1921 – November 8, 1987) was an American racing driver. He is the most successful driver in Sports Car Club of America history, with over 350 career wins. Fitzgerald was also at one time the oldest driver to run a NASCAR Winston Cup Series race, being 65 years old when he ran in the 1987 Budweiser 400 at Riverside International Raceway for Hendrick Motorsports.

== Career ==
Fitzgerald spent his early life as an engineer for Western Electric, specializing in missile systems, and began his racing career in 1957. Fitzgerald then ran Datsun 1500 Roadsters, followed by a 2000 Roadster when competing in the SCCA National Championship Runoffs. Fitzgerald won his first SCCA National Championship in D Production in 1970, defeating Carl Swanson after he lost a wheel. Fitzgerald won the GT-1 national championship in 1984, and would also become the winningest driver in SCCA history with over 350 wins in his career, along with winning the final National held at Virginia International Raceway.

After his retirement from Western Electric in 1980, Fitzgerald became an instructor at SCCA driving schools, which included helping NASCAR drivers prepare for the road courses Watkins Glen International and Sears Point Raceway. A resident of Clemmons, North Carolina, Fitzgerald befriended NASCAR team owners Richard Childress and Rick Hendrick in the process, eventually driving for the latter in the Winston Cup Series. He also became a friend and racing teammate to actor Paul Newman in the Trans-Am Series; Newman cast Fitzgerald as a crane operator in the movie Harry & Son, in a scene that was cut from the final release of the film.

Fitzgerald ran two races in the Winston Cup Series, both as a road course ringer at Riverside International Raceway, in 1986 with Bobby Wawak's team, and in 1987 with Hendrick Motorsports. In the 1986 Winston Western 500, Fitzgerald started 35th and finished 39th after completing 29 of 119 laps due to issues with the clutch. The following year, in the Budweiser 400, Fitzgerald started 37th and finished seventeenth, two laps down. The race made Fitzgerald the oldest driver to run a Cup race at the age of 65, a record that would stand until Morgan Shepherd ran the 2013 Camping World RV Sales 301 at the age of 71. Fitzgerald had planned to compete in additional Winston Cup Series races for Hendrick during the 1988 season.

== Death ==
Entering the Trans-Am Series race Grand Prix of St. Petersburg on November 8, 1987, the final race of the 1987 Trans-Am season, Fitzgerald was the oldest racer. On lap three, Fitzgerald crashed his Nissan 300ZX Turbo into a Jersey barrier in turn 1 at over 100 miles per hour (160 km/h), according to fellow competitor Paul Gentilozzi. Fitzgerald was extracted from the vehicle and transported to Bayfront Medical Center, where he was declared dead on arrival. Fitzgerald's teammate and friend, Paul Newman, had planned to continue competing in his honor when the race restarted, but suffered a mechanical problem. An autopsy eventually revealed that Fitzgerald had died from a broken neck.

In 1988, Road Atlanta dedicated the track's Jim Fitzgerald Memorial Park in Fitzgerald's honor.

In 2011, SCCA inducted Fitzgerald into the Hall of Fame.

== Motorsports career results ==
=== SCCA National Championship Runoffs ===
Year	Track	Car	Engine	Class	Finish	Start	Status
1984	Road Atlanta	Nissan 300ZX Turbo	Nissan	GT1	1	2	Running
1985	Road Atlanta	Nissan 300ZX Turbo	Nissan	GT1	2	2	Running
1986	Road Atlanta	Nissan 300ZX Turbo	Nissan	GT1	2	4	Running

=== NASCAR ===
(key) (Bold – Pole position awarded by qualifying time. Italics – Pole position earned by points standings or practice time. * – Most laps led.)

==== Winston Cup Series ====
NASCAR Winston Cup Series results
Year	Team	No.	Make	1	2	3	4	5	6	7	8	9	10	11	12	13	14	15	16	17	18	19	20	21	22	23	24	25	26	27	28	29	NWCC	Pts
1986	Wawak Racing	74	Chevy	DAY	RCH	CAR	ATL	BRI	DAR	NWS	MAR	TAL	DOV	CLT	RSD	POC	MCH	DAY	POC	TAL	GLN	MCH	BRI	DAR	RCH	DOV	MAR	NWS	CLT	CAR	ATL	RSD; 39	120th	46
1987	Hendrick Motorsports	51	Chevy	DAY	CAR	RCH	ATL	DAR	NWS	BRI	MAR	TAL	CLT	DOV	POC	RSD; 17	MCH	DAY	POC	TAL	GLN	MCH	BRI	DAR	RCH	DOV	MAR	NWS	CLT	CAR	RSD	ATL	79th	112
