= David Sosebee =

American racing driver (born 1955)

- Born: December 8, 1955 (age 70); Dawsonville, Georgia, U.S.

NASCAR Cup Series career
- 10 races run over 4 years
- Best finish: 61st (1987)
- First race: 1979 Gabriel 400 (Michigan)
- Last race: 1988 Miller High Life 400 (Michigan)
Wins	Top tens	Poles
0	0	0

David Sosebee (born December 8, 1955, in Dawsonville, Georgia) is an American retired NASCAR Winston Cup Series race car driver who competed from 1979 to 1988. He is the son of racer Gober Sosebee.

== Summary ==
Sosebee only failed to qualify for one race, the 1988 Atlanta Journal 500 that took place in Hampton, Georgia. While starting an average of 33rd place, his average finishers are in 31st place. He would participate in 1,673 laps of professional stock car racing while leading in none of them. His total career earnings added up to $35,210 ($95,851.65 when adjusted for inflation). Sosebee started racing at the age of 23 and stopped at the age of 32.

Sosebee performed best on restrictor plate tracks with his average finish of 28th place; his worst performances were on intermediate tracks; where he would finish 33rd place on average.

Sosebee competed in the first NASCAR race held outside North America, the 1988 Goodyear NASCAR 500 at the Calder Park Thunderdome in Australia, where he finished sixteenth, best among cars not running, after retiring with transmission issues 205 laps into the event. He returned to the track later in the year for the NASCAR Christmas 500, where he finished 26th.

== Motorsports career results ==
=== NASCAR ===
(key) (Bold – Pole position awarded by qualifying time. Italics – Pole position earned by points standings or practice time. * – Most laps led.)

==== Winston Cup Series ====
NASCAR Winston Cup Series results
Year	Team	No.	Make	1	2	3	4	5	6	7	8	9	10	11	12	13	14	15	16	17	18	19	20	21	22	23	24	25	26	27	28	29	30	31	NWCC	Pts	Ref
1979	Sosebee Racing	81	Chevy	RSD	DAY	CAR	RCH	ATL	NWS	BRI	DAR	MAR	TAL	NSV	DOV	CLT	TWS	RSD	MCH; 28	DAY	NSV	POC	TAL	MCH	BRI	DAR	RCH	DOV	MAR	CLT; 27	NWS	CAR	ATL; 33	ONT	80th	146	
1986	Sosebee Racing	91	Chevy	DAY	RCH	CAR	ATL	BRI	DAR; DNQ	NWS	MAR	TAL	DOV	CLT	RSD	POC	MCH	DAY	POC	TAL	GLN	MCH	BRI	DAR	RCH	DOV	MAR	NWS	CLT; 34	CAR	ATL; 36	RSD			90th	116	
1987	Hamby Racing	12	Chevy	DAY; 28	CAR; 39	RCH																													61st	225	
1987	Hamby Racing	12	Olds				ATL; 21	DAR	NWS	BRI	MAR	TAL	CLT	DOV	POC	RSD	MCH	DAY	POC	TAL	GLN	MCH	BRI	DAR	RCH	DOV	MAR	NWS	CLT	CAR	RSD	ATL			61st	225	
1988	LC Racing	92	Ford	DAY	RCH	CAR	ATL; 28	DAR	BRI	NWS	MAR	TAL	CLT	DOV	RSD	POC	MCH; 31	DAY	POC	TAL	GLN	MCH	BRI	DAR	RCH	DOV	MAR	CLT	NWS	CAR	PHO	ATL			75th	79	

===== Daytona 500 =====
Year	Team	Manufacturer	Start	Finish
1987	Hamby Racing	Chevrolet	39	28
