= 1987 Summer 500 =

16th race of the 1987 NASCAR Winston Cup Series

Race details
- Race 16 of 29 in the 1987 NASCAR Winston Cup Series
- The 1987 Summer 500 program cover, featuring Bill Elliott.
- Date: July 19, 1987
- Official name: 15th Annual Summer 500
- Location: Long Pond, Pennsylvania, Pocono Raceway
- Course: Permanent racing facility
- Course length: 2.5 miles (4.0 km)
- Distance: 200 laps, 500 mi (804.672 km)
- Scheduled distance: 200 laps, 500 mi (804.672 km)
- Average speed: 121.745 miles per hour (195.930 km/h)
- Attendance: 90,000

Pole position
Driver	Tim Richmond	Hendrick Motorsports
- Time: 57.700

Most laps led
Driver	Dale Earnhardt	Richard Childress Racing
- Laps: 85

Winner
No. 3	Dale Earnhardt	Richard Childress Racing

Television in the United States
- Network: SETN
- Announcers: Eli Gold, Jerry Punch

Radio in the United States
- Radio: Motor Racing Network

The 1987 Summer 500 was the 16th stock car race of the 1987 NASCAR Winston Cup Series season and the 15th iteration of the event. The race was held on Sunday, July 19, 1987, before an audience of 90,000 in Long Pond, Pennsylvania, at Pocono Raceway, a 2.5 miles (4.0 km) triangular permanent course. The race took the scheduled 200 laps to complete.

Heading into the final lap of the race, Richard Childress Racing's Dale Earnhardt and owner-driver Alan Kulwicki engaged in a battle for the victory. Earnhardt and Kulwicki went side-by-side heading into the second turn; Kulwicki over-drove the turn, leading to Earnhardt gaining the lead for the victory. The victory was Earnhardt's 28th career NASCAR Winston Cup Series victory and his eighth victory of the season. To fill out the top three, the aforementioned Alan Kulwicki and owner-driver Buddy Baker finished second and third, respectively.

== Background ==
The layout of Pocono International Raceway, the venue where the race was held.

The race was held at Pocono International Raceway, which is a three-turn superspeedway located in Long Pond, Pennsylvania. The track hosts two annual NASCAR Sprint Cup Series races, as well as one Xfinity Series and Camping World Truck Series event. Until 2019, the track also hosted an IndyCar Series race.

Pocono International Raceway is one of a very few NASCAR tracks not owned by either Speedway Motorsports, Inc. or International Speedway Corporation. It is operated by the Igdalsky siblings Brandon, Nicholas, and sister Ashley, and cousins Joseph IV and Chase Mattioli, all of whom are third-generation members of the family-owned Mattco Inc, started by Joseph II and Rose Mattioli.

Outside of the NASCAR races, the track is used throughout the year by the Sports Car Club of America (SCCA) and motorcycle clubs as well as racing schools and an IndyCar race. The triangular oval also has three separate infield sections of racetrack – North Course, East Course and South Course. Each of these infield sections use a separate portion of the tri-oval to complete the track. During regular non-race weekends, multiple clubs can use the track by running on different infield sections. Also some of the infield sections can be run in either direction, or multiple infield sections can be put together – such as running the North Course and the South Course and using the tri-oval to connect the two.

=== Entry list ===
- (R) denotes rookie driver.

#	Driver	Team	Make	Sponsor
1	Brett Bodine	Ellington Racing	Buick	Bull's-Eye Barbecue Sauce
3	Dale Earnhardt	Richard Childress Racing	Chevrolet	Wrangler
4	Rick Wilson	Morgan–McClure Motorsports	Oldsmobile	Kodak
04	Charlie Rudolph	Rudolph Racing	Chevrolet	Sunoco
5	Geoff Bodine	Hendrick Motorsports	Chevrolet	Levi Garrett
05	Ed Sutton	Wiltshire Racing	Oldsmobile	Wiltshire Racing
6	Connie Saylor	U.S. Racing	Chevrolet	U.S. Racing
7	Alan Kulwicki	AK Racing	Ford	Zerex
8	Bobby Hillin Jr.	Stavola Brothers Racing	Buick	Miller American
9	Bill Elliott	Melling Racing	Ford	Coors
11	Terry Labonte	Junior Johnson & Associates	Chevrolet	Budweiser
12	Trevor Boys	Hamby Racing	Chevrolet	Hamby Racing
15	Ricky Rudd	Bud Moore Engineering	Ford	Motorcraft Quality Parts
17	Darrell Waltrip	Hendrick Motorsports	Chevrolet	Tide
18	Dale Jarrett (R)	Freedlander Motorsports	Chevrolet	Freedlander Financial
19	Derrike Cope (R)	Stoke Racing	Chevrolet	Stoke Racing
21	Kyle Petty	Wood Brothers Racing	Ford	Citgo
22	Bobby Allison	Stavola Brothers Racing	Buick	Miller American
25	Tim Richmond	Hendrick Motorsports	Chevrolet	Folgers
26	Morgan Shepherd	King Racing	Buick	Quaker State
27	Rusty Wallace	Blue Max Racing	Pontiac	Kodiak
28	Davey Allison (R)	Ranier-Lundy Racing	Ford	Texaco, Havoline
30	Michael Waltrip	Bahari Racing	Chevrolet	All Pro Auto Parts
31	Ron Shephard	Ron Shephard Racing	Chevrolet	L. B. S. Graphics, National Parts Peddler
33	Harry Gant	Mach 1 Racing	Chevrolet	Skoal Bandit
35	Benny Parsons	Hendrick Motorsports	Chevrolet	Folgers
43	Richard Petty	Petty Enterprises	Pontiac	STP
44	Sterling Marlin	Hagan Racing	Oldsmobile	Piedmont Airlines
50	Greg Sacks	Dingman Brothers Racing	Pontiac	Valvoline
52	Jimmy Means	Jimmy Means Racing	Pontiac	Jimmy Means Racing
55	Phil Parsons	Jackson Bros. Motorsports	Oldsmobile	Copenhagen
62	Steve Christman (R)	Winkle Motorsports	Pontiac	AC Spark Plug
63	Jocko Maggiacomo	Linro Motorsports	Chevrolet	Linro Motorsports
64	Rodney Combs	Langley Racing	Ford	Sunny King Ford
67	Buddy Arrington	Arrington Racing	Ford	Pannill Sweatshirts
70	J. D. McDuffie	McDuffie Racing	Pontiac	Rumple Furniture
71	Dave Marcis	Marcis Auto Racing	Chevrolet	Lifebuoy
75	Neil Bonnett	RahMoc Enterprises	Pontiac	Valvoline
80	Jimmy Horton	S&H Racing	Ford	S&H Racing
81	Mike Potter	Fillip Racing	Ford	Fillip Racing
85	Bobby Gerhart	Bobby Gerhart Racing	Chevrolet	J. Omar Landis Enterprises
88	Buddy Baker	Baker–Schiff Racing	Oldsmobile	Crisco
90	Ken Schrader	Donlavey Racing	Ford	Red Baron Frozen Pizza

== Qualifying ==
Qualifying was split into two rounds. The first round was held on Saturday, July 18, at 10:00 AM EST. Each driver had one lap to set a time. During the first round, the top 20 drivers in the round were guaranteed a starting spot in the race. If a driver was not able to guarantee a spot in the first round, they had the option to scrub their time from the first round and try and run a faster lap time in a second round qualifying run, held on Saturday, at 3:00 PM EST. As with the first round, each driver had one lap to set a time. For this specific race, positions 21-40 were decided on time, and depending on who needed it, a select amount of positions were given to cars who had not otherwise qualified but were high enough in owner's points; up to two were given.

Tim Richmond, driving for Hendrick Motorsports, managed to win the pole, setting a time of 57.700 and an average speed of 155.979 miles per hour (251.024 km/h) in the first round.

Three drivers failed to qualify.

=== Full qualifying results ===
Pos.	#	Driver	Team	Make	Time	Speed
1	25	Tim Richmond	Hendrick Motorsports	Chevrolet	57.700	155.979
2	7	Alan Kulwicki	AK Racing	Ford	57.788	155.796
3	9	Bill Elliott	Melling Racing	Ford	57.824	155.645
4	26	Morgan Shepherd	King Racing	Buick	57.931	155.357
5	21	Kyle Petty	Wood Brothers Racing	Ford	58.046	155.049
6	28	Davey Allison (R)	Ranier-Lundy Racing	Ford	58.074	154.975
7	33	Harry Gant	Mach 1 Racing	Chevrolet	58.138	154.804
8	15	Ricky Rudd	Bud Moore Engineering	Ford	58.180	154.692
9	1	Brett Bodine	Ellington Racing	Chevrolet	58.260	154.480
10	11	Terry Labonte	Junior Johnson & Associates	Chevrolet	58.304	154.363
11	75	Neil Bonnett	RahMoc Enterprises	Pontiac	58.336	154.279
12	5	Geoff Bodine	Hendrick Motorsports	Chevrolet	58.366	154.199
13	88	Buddy Baker	Baker–Schiff Racing	Oldsmobile	58.391	154.133
14	27	Rusty Wallace	Blue Max Racing	Pontiac	58.399	154.112
15	35	Benny Parsons	Hendrick Motorsports	Chevrolet	58.410	154.083
16	3	Dale Earnhardt	Richard Childress Racing	Chevrolet	58.418	154.062
17	22	Bobby Allison	Stavola Brothers Racing	Buick	58.553	153.707
18	55	Phil Parsons	Jackson Bros. Motorsports	Oldsmobile	58.646	153.463
19	30	Michael Waltrip	Bahari Racing	Chevrolet	58.672	153.395
20	4	Rick Wilson	Morgan–McClure Motorsports	Oldsmobile	58.700	153.322
Failed to lock in Round 1
21	90	Ken Schrader	Donlavey Racing	Ford	58.641	153.466
22	43	Richard Petty	Petty Enterprises	Pontiac	58.743	153.210
23	44	Sterling Marlin	Hagan Racing	Oldsmobile	58.851	152.929
24	71	Dave Marcis	Marcis Auto Racing	Chevrolet	58.988	152.573
25	17	Darrell Waltrip	Hendrick Motorsports	Chevrolet	59.011	152.514
26	8	Bobby Hillin Jr.	Stavola Brothers Racing	Buick	59.023	152.483
27	50	Greg Sacks	Dingman Brothers Racing	Pontiac	59.095	152.297
28	18	Dale Jarrett (R)	Freedlander Motorsports	Chevrolet	59.198	152.032
29	62	Steve Christman (R)	Winkle Motorsports	Pontiac	59.713	150.721
30	19	Derrike Cope (R)	Stoke Racing	Chevrolet	59.722	150.698
31	67	Buddy Arrington	Arrington Racing	Ford	59.888	150.281
32	63	Jocko Maggiacomo	Linro Motorsports	Chevrolet	59.890	150.276
33	12	Trevor Boys	Hamby Racing	Chevrolet	59.914	150.215
34	52	Jimmy Means	Jimmy Means Racing	Chevrolet	59.921	150.198
35	04	Charlie Rudolph	Rudolph Racing	Chevrolet	59.922	150.195
36	64	Rodney Combs	Langley Racing	Ford	1:00.108	149.730
37	85	Bobby Gerhart	Bobby Gerhart Racing	Chevrolet	1:00.577	148.571
38	31	Ron Shephard	Ron Shephard Racing	Chevrolet	1:00.716	148.231
39	80	Jimmy Horton	S&H Racing	Ford	1:00.753	148.141
40	6	Connie Saylor	U.S. Racing	Chevrolet	1:01.379	146.640
Failed to qualify
41	70	J. D. McDuffie	McDuffie Racing	Pontiac	-*	-*
42	81	Mike Potter	Fillip Racing	Ford	-*	-*
43	05	Ed Sutton	Wiltshire Racing	Oldsmobile	-*	-*
Official starting lineup

== Race results ==
Fin	St	#	Driver	Team	Make	Laps	Led	Status	Pts	Winnings
1	16	3	Dale Earnhardt	Richard Childress Racing	Chevrolet	200	85	running	185	$55,875
2	2	7	Alan Kulwicki	AK Racing	Ford	200	1	running	175	$32,880
3	13	88	Buddy Baker	Baker–Schiff Racing	Oldsmobile	200	2	running	170	$18,100
4	15	35	Benny Parsons	Hendrick Motorsports	Chevrolet	200	1	running	165	$21,445
5	6	28	Davey Allison (R)	Ranier-Lundy Racing	Ford	200	0	running	155	$11,650
6	10	11	Terry Labonte	Junior Johnson & Associates	Chevrolet	200	11	running	155	$15,950
7	11	75	Neil Bonnett	RahMoc Enterprises	Pontiac	200	5	running	151	$10,420
8	22	43	Richard Petty	Petty Enterprises	Pontiac	199	0	running	142	$9,500
9	24	71	Dave Marcis	Marcis Auto Racing	Chevrolet	199	6	running	143	$8,970
10	21	90	Ken Schrader	Donlavey Racing	Ford	199	0	running	134	$12,065
11	33	12	Trevor Boys	Hamby Racing	Chevrolet	199	4	running	0	$8,050
12	28	18	Dale Jarrett (R)	Freedlander Motorsports	Chevrolet	198	0	running	127	$7,670
13	35	04	Charlie Rudolph	Rudolph Racing	Chevrolet	198	0	running	124	$3,775
14	14	27	Rusty Wallace	Blue Max Racing	Pontiac	197	22	running	126	$12,765
15	26	8	Bobby Hillin Jr.	Stavola Brothers Racing	Buick	196	0	engine	118	$10,640
16	36	64	Rodney Combs	Langley Racing	Ford	196	0	running	115	$6,590
17	31	67	Buddy Arrington	Arrington Racing	Ford	196	0	running	112	$6,275
18	40	6	Connie Saylor	U.S. Racing	Chevrolet	194	0	running	109	$6,010
19	25	17	Darrell Waltrip	Hendrick Motorsports	Chevrolet	190	0	running	106	$3,605
20	5	21	Kyle Petty	Wood Brothers Racing	Ford	185	9	running	108	$10,250
21	38	31	Ron Shephard	Ron Shephard Racing	Chevrolet	176	0	crash	100	$2,595
22	9	1	Brett Bodine	Ellington Racing	Chevrolet	174	2	engine	102	$2,490
23	29	62	Steve Christman (R)	Winkle Motorsports	Pontiac	164	0	engine	94	$2,385
24	32	63	Jocko Maggiacomo	Linro Motorsports	Chevrolet	156	0	engine	91	$2,330
25	23	44	Sterling Marlin	Hagan Racing	Oldsmobile	149	0	overheating	88	$5,140
26	8	15	Ricky Rudd	Bud Moore Engineering	Ford	142	4	engine	90	$10,620
27	17	22	Bobby Allison	Stavola Brothers Racing	Buick	130	8	engine	87	$9,165
28	37	85	Bobby Gerhart	Bobby Gerhart Racing	Chevrolet	126	0	engine	79	$2,110
29	1	25	Tim Richmond	Hendrick Motorsports	Chevrolet	120	14	engine	81	$5,555
30	7	33	Harry Gant	Mach 1 Racing	Chevrolet	83	0	crash	73	$4,755
31	30	19	Derrike Cope (R)	Stoke Racing	Chevrolet	76	0	engine	70	$1,945
32	3	9	Bill Elliott	Melling Racing	Ford	75	26	overheating	72	$10,985
33	39	80	Jimmy Horton	S&H Racing	Ford	60	0	oil pressure	64	$1,810
34	12	5	Geoff Bodine	Hendrick Motorsports	Chevrolet	50	0	steering	61	$8,755
35	27	50	Greg Sacks	Dingman Brothers Racing	Pontiac	50	0	engine	58	$1,700
36	4	26	Morgan Shepherd	King Racing	Buick	47	0	transmission	55	$4,380
37	19	30	Michael Waltrip	Bahari Racing	Chevrolet	37	0	crash	52	$3,615
38	34	52	Jimmy Means	Jimmy Means Racing	Chevrolet	17	0	oil leak	49	$3,585
39	18	55	Phil Parsons	Jackson Bros. Motorsports	Oldsmobile	16	0	engine	46	$1,555
40	20	4	Rick Wilson	Morgan–McClure Motorsports	Oldsmobile	11	0	engine	43	$1,525
Failed to qualify
41		70	J. D. McDuffie	McDuffie Racing	Pontiac					
42		81	Mike Potter	Fillip Racing	Ford					
43		05	Ed Sutton	Wiltshire Racing	Oldsmobile					
Official race results

== Standings after the race ==
Drivers' Championship standings

	Pos	Driver	Points
	1	Dale Earnhardt	2,654
1	2	Neil Bonnett	2,245 (-409)
1	3	Bill Elliott	2,214 (-440)
	4	Terry Labonte	2,163 (–491)
	5	Kyle Petty	2,111 (–543)
1	6	Ken Schrader	2,089 (–565)
1	7	Darrell Waltrip	2,072 (–582)
	8	Ricky Rudd	2,036 (–618)
	9	Richard Petty	2,015 (–639)
	10	Rusty Wallace	1,983 (–671)
Official driver's standings

- Note: Only the first 10 positions are included for the driver standings.

Previous race: 1987 Pepsi Firecracker 400	NASCAR Winston Cup Series; 1987 season	Next race: 1987 Talladega 500
