= 1987 Talladega 500 =

17th race of the 1987 NASCAR Winston Cup Series

Race details
- Race 17 of 29 in the 1987 NASCAR Winston Cup Series
- The 1987 Talladega 500 program cover, featuring Bobby Hillin Jr.
- Date: July 26, 1987
- Official name: 19th Annual Talladega 500
- Location: Lincoln, Alabama, Alabama International Motor Speedway
- Course: Permanent racing facility
- Course length: 4.28 km (2.66 miles)
- Distance: 188 laps, 500.08 mi (804.8 km)
- Scheduled distance: 188 laps, 500.08 mi (804.8 km)
- Average speed: 171.293 miles per hour (275.669 km/h)
- Attendance: 105,000

Pole position
Driver	Bill Elliott	Melling Racing
- Time: 46.981

Most laps led
Driver	Davey Allison	Ranier-Lundy Racing
- Laps: 77

Winner
No. 9	Bill Elliott	Melling Racing

Television in the United States
- Network: CBS
- Announcers: Ken Squier, Ned Jarrett

Radio in the United States
- Radio: Motor Racing Network

The 1987 Talladega 500 was the 17th stock car race of the 1987 NASCAR Winston Cup Series season and the 19th iteration of the event. The race was held on Sunday, July 26, 1987, before an audience of 105,000 in Lincoln, Alabama at Alabama International Motor Speedway, a 2.66 miles (4.28 km) permanent triangle-shaped superspeedway. The race took the scheduled 188 laps to complete.

By race's end, Melling Racing's Bill Elliott managed to fend off a late-race charge by Ranier-Lundy Racing's Davey Allison in the final laps of the race to take his 19th career NASCAR Winston Cup Series victory and his second victory of the season. To fill out the top three, the aforementioned Davey Allison and Richard Childress Racing's Dale Earnhardt finished second and third, respectively.

== Background ==
The layout of Alabama International Motor Speedway, the venue where the race was held.

Talladega Superspeedway, originally known as Alabama International Motor Superspeedway (AIMS), is a motorsports complex located north of Talladega, Alabama. It is located on the former Anniston Air Force Base in the small city of Lincoln. The track is a tri-oval and was constructed in the 1960s by the International Speedway Corporation, a business controlled by the France family. Talladega is most known for its steep banking and the unique location of the start/finish line that's located just past the exit to pit road. The track currently hosts the NASCAR series such as the NASCAR Cup Series, Xfinity Series and the Camping World Truck Series. Talladega is the longest NASCAR oval, a 2.66-mile-long (4.28 km) tri-oval like the Daytona International Speedway, which also is a 2.5-mile-long (4.0 km) tri-oval.

=== Entry list ===
- (R) denotes rookie driver.

#	Driver	Team	Make	Sponsor
0	Delma Cowart	H. L. Waters Racing	Chevrolet	Heyward Grooms Construction
1	Brett Bodine	Ellington Racing	Chevrolet	Bull's-Eye Barbecue Sauce
01	Dave Pletcher Sr.	Weaver Racing	Ford	Ernie Haire Ford
3	Dale Earnhardt	Richard Childress Racing	Chevrolet	Wrangler
4	Rick Wilson	Morgan–McClure Motorsports	Oldsmobile	Kodak
5	Geoff Bodine	Hendrick Motorsports	Chevrolet	Levi Garrett
6	Connie Saylor	U.S. Racing	Chevrolet	U.S. Racing
7	Alan Kulwicki	AK Racing	Ford	Zerex
8	Bobby Hillin Jr.	Stavola Brothers Racing	Buick	Miller American
9	Bill Elliott	Melling Racing	Ford	Coors
11	Terry Labonte	Junior Johnson & Associates	Chevrolet	Budweiser
12	Jeff Swindell	Hamby Racing	Chevrolet	Hamby Racing
14	A. J. Foyt	A. J. Foyt Racing	Oldsmobile	Copenhagen
15	Ricky Rudd	Bud Moore Engineering	Ford	Motorcraft Quality Parts
17	Darrell Waltrip	Hendrick Motorsports	Chevrolet	Tide
18	Dale Jarrett (R)	Freedlander Motorsports	Chevrolet	Coats & Clark
21	Kyle Petty	Wood Brothers Racing	Ford	Citgo
22	Bobby Allison	Stavola Brothers Racing	Buick	Miller American
25	Tim Richmond	Hendrick Motorsports	Chevrolet	Folgers
26	Morgan Shepherd	King Racing	Buick	Quaker State
27	Rusty Wallace	Blue Max Racing	Pontiac	Kodiak
28	Davey Allison (R)	Ranier-Lundy Racing	Ford	Texaco, Havoline
29	Cale Yarborough	Cale Yarborough Motorsports	Oldsmobile	Hardee's
30	Michael Waltrip	Bahari Racing	Chevrolet	All Pro Auto Parts
33	Harry Gant	Mach 1 Racing	Chevrolet	Skoal Bandit
35	Benny Parsons	Hendrick Motorsports	Chevrolet	Folgers Decaf
43	Richard Petty	Petty Enterprises	Pontiac	STP
44	Sterling Marlin	Hagan Racing	Oldsmobile	Piedmont Airlines
48	Jerry Holden	Hylton Motorsports	Chevrolet	Hylton Motorsports
52	Jimmy Means	Jimmy Means Racing	Pontiac	Eureka
55	Phil Parsons	Jackson Bros. Motorsports	Oldsmobile	Skoal Classic
62	Steve Christman (R)	Winkle Motorsports	Pontiac	AC Spark Plug
64	Rodney Combs	Langley Racing	Ford	Sunny King Ford
67	Chet Fillip	Arrington Racing	Ford	Pannill Sweatshirts
70	J. D. McDuffie	McDuffie Racing	Pontiac	Rumple Furniture
71	Dave Marcis	Marcis Auto Racing	Chevrolet	Lifebuoy
75	Neil Bonnett	RahMoc Enterprises	Pontiac	Valvoline
82	Mark Stahl	Stahl Racing	Ford	Auto Bell Car Wash
83	Lake Speed	Speed Racing	Oldsmobile	Wynn's, Kmart
88	Buddy Baker	Baker–Schiff Racing	Oldsmobile	Crisco
90	Ken Schrader	Donlavey Racing	Ford	Red Baron Frozen Pizza

== Qualifying ==
Qualifying was split into two rounds. The first round was held on Thursday, July 23, at 2:00 PM EST. Each driver had one lap to set a time. During the first round, the top 20 drivers in the round were guaranteed a starting spot in the race. If a driver was not able to guarantee a spot in the first round, they had the option to scrub their time from the first round and try and run a faster lap time in a second round qualifying run, held on Friday, July 24, at 2:00 PM EST. As with the first round, each driver had one lap to set a time. For this specific race, positions 21-40 were decided on time, and depending on who needed it, a select amount of positions were given to cars who had not otherwise qualified but were high enough in owner's points; up to two provisionals were given.

Bill Elliott, driving for Melling Racing, managed to win the pole, setting a time of 46.981 and an average speed of 203.827 miles per hour (328.028 km/h) in the first round.

Connie Saylor was the only driver to fail to qualify.

=== Full qualifying results ===
Pos.	#	Driver	Team	Make	Time	Speed
1	9	Bill Elliott	Melling Racing	Ford	46.981	203.827
2	3	Dale Earnhardt	Richard Childress Racing	Chevrolet	47.066	203.459
3	28	Davey Allison (R)	Ranier-Lundy Racing	Ford	47.154	203.079
4	17	Darrell Waltrip	Hendrick Motorsports	Chevrolet	47.295	202.474
5	11	Terry Labonte	Junior Johnson & Associates	Chevrolet	47.304	202.435
6	26	Morgan Shepherd	King Racing	Buick	47.347	202.251
7	22	Bobby Allison	Stavola Brothers Racing	Buick	47.352	202.230
8	21	Kyle Petty	Wood Brothers Racing	Ford	47.376	202.128
9	27	Rusty Wallace	Blue Max Racing	Pontiac	47.397	202.038
10	44	Sterling Marlin	Hagan Racing	Oldsmobile	47.471	201.723
11	5	Geoff Bodine	Hendrick Motorsports	Chevrolet	47.537	201.443
12	88	Buddy Baker	Baker–Schiff Racing	Oldsmobile	47.647	200.978
13	7	Alan Kulwicki	AK Racing	Ford	47.770	200.461
14	83	Lake Speed	Speed Racing	Oldsmobile	47.803	200.322
15	55	Phil Parsons	Jackson Bros. Motorsports	Oldsmobile	47.805	200.314
16	25	Tim Richmond	Hendrick Motorsports	Chevrolet	47.888	199.967
17	75	Neil Bonnett	RahMoc Enterprises	Pontiac	48.022	199.409
18	14	A. J. Foyt	A. J. Foyt Racing	Oldsmobile	48.055	199.272
19	35	Benny Parsons	Hendrick Motorsports	Chevrolet	48.055	199.272
20	8	Bobby Hillin Jr.	Stavola Brothers Racing	Buick	48.069	199.214
Failed to lock in Round 1
21	30	Michael Waltrip	Bahari Racing	Chevrolet	47.977	199.596
22	29	Cale Yarborough	Cale Yarborough Motorsports	Oldsmobile	48.049	199.297
23	1	Brett Bodine	Ellington Racing	Chevrolet	48.088	199.135
24	01	Dave Pletcher Sr.	Weaver Racing	Ford	48.098	199.094
25	71	Dave Marcis	Marcis Auto Racing	Chevrolet	48.114	199.027
26	90	Ken Schrader	Donlavey Racing	Ford	48.121	198.998
27	15	Ricky Rudd	Bud Moore Engineering	Ford	48.197	198.685
28	43	Richard Petty	Petty Enterprises	Pontiac	48.208	198.639
29	33	Harry Gant	Mach 1 Racing	Chevrolet	48.474	197.549
30	82	Mark Stahl	Stahl Racing	Ford	48.601	197.033
31	64	Rodney Combs	Langley Racing	Ford	48.689	196.677
32	4	Rick Wilson	Morgan–McClure Motorsports	Oldsmobile	48.796	196.246
33	12	Jeff Swindell	Hamby Racing	Chevrolet	49.206	194.610
34	67	Chet Fillip	Arrington Racing	Ford	49.288	194.287
35	70	J. D. McDuffie	McDuffie Racing	Pontiac	49.302	194.231
36	52	Jimmy Means	Jimmy Means Racing	Chevrolet	49.352	194.035
37	18	Dale Jarrett (R)	Freedlander Motorsports	Chevrolet	49.535	193.318
38	0	Delma Cowart	H. L. Waters Racing	Chevrolet	49.540	193.298
39	62	Steve Christman (R)	Winkle Motorsports	Pontiac	49.742	192.513
40	48	Jerry Holden	Hylton Motorsports	Chevrolet	49.748	192.490
Failed to qualify
41	6	Connie Saylor	U.S. Racing	Chevrolet	49.860	192.058
Official first round qualifying results
Official starting lineup

== Race results ==
Fin	St	#	Driver	Team	Make	Laps	Led	Status	Pts	Winnings
1	1	9	Bill Elliott	Melling Racing	Ford	188	72	running	180	$70,920
2	3	28	Davey Allison (R)	Ranier-Lundy Racing	Ford	188	77	running	180	$39,115
3	2	3	Dale Earnhardt	Richard Childress Racing	Chevrolet	188	8	running	170	$35,050
4	4	17	Darrell Waltrip	Hendrick Motorsports	Chevrolet	188	0	running	160	$19,120
5	22	29	Cale Yarborough	Cale Yarborough Motorsports	Oldsmobile	188	4	running	160	$13,465
6	5	11	Terry Labonte	Junior Johnson & Associates	Chevrolet	188	22	running	155	$19,445
7	14	83	Lake Speed	Speed Racing	Oldsmobile	188	0	running	146	$8,845
8	9	27	Rusty Wallace	Blue Max Racing	Pontiac	188	1	running	147	$14,645
9	8	21	Kyle Petty	Wood Brothers Racing	Ford	188	1	running	143	$12,695
10	12	88	Buddy Baker	Baker–Schiff Racing	Oldsmobile	188	0	running	134	$8,720
11	16	25	Tim Richmond	Hendrick Motorsports	Chevrolet	188	0	running	130	$5,065
12	7	22	Bobby Allison	Stavola Brothers Racing	Buick	188	0	running	127	$11,795
13	11	5	Geoff Bodine	Hendrick Motorsports	Chevrolet	187	0	running	124	$11,575
14	10	44	Sterling Marlin	Hagan Racing	Oldsmobile	187	0	running	121	$9,900
15	27	15	Ricky Rudd	Bud Moore Engineering	Ford	187	0	running	118	$12,975
16	32	4	Rick Wilson	Morgan–McClure Motorsports	Oldsmobile	187	0	running	115	$4,115
17	21	30	Michael Waltrip	Bahari Racing	Chevrolet	186	0	running	112	$8,930
18	26	90	Ken Schrader	Donlavey Racing	Ford	185	0	running	109	$7,910
19	31	64	Rodney Combs	Langley Racing	Ford	184	0	running	106	$7,690
20	34	67	Chet Fillip	Arrington Racing	Ford	184	0	running	103	$7,965
21	37	18	Dale Jarrett (R)	Freedlander Motorsports	Chevrolet	183	0	running	100	$7,210
22	25	71	Dave Marcis	Marcis Auto Racing	Chevrolet	183	2	running	102	$6,865
23	13	7	Alan Kulwicki	AK Racing	Ford	180	0	running	94	$7,445
24	38	0	Delma Cowart	H. L. Waters Racing	Chevrolet	180	0	running	0	$3,130
25	35	70	J. D. McDuffie	McDuffie Racing	Pontiac	177	0	running	88	$3,120
26	39	62	Steve Christman (R)	Winkle Motorsports	Pontiac	176	0	running	85	$2,955
27	24	01	Dave Pletcher Sr.	Weaver Racing	Ford	145	0	crash	82	$2,895
28	40	48	Jerry Holden	Hylton Motorsports	Chevrolet	133	0	engine	79	$2,850
29	15	55	Phil Parsons	Jackson Bros. Motorsports	Oldsmobile	132	0	engine	76	$2,765
30	19	35	Benny Parsons	Hendrick Motorsports	Chevrolet	131	0	engine	73	$11,905
31	29	33	Harry Gant	Mach 1 Racing	Chevrolet	124	0	engine	70	$5,690
32	17	75	Neil Bonnett	RahMoc Enterprises	Pontiac	116	0	running	67	$6,110
33	30	82	Mark Stahl	Stahl Racing	Ford	115	0	engine	64	$2,525
34	33	12	Jeff Swindell	Hamby Racing	Chevrolet	102	0	fatigue	61	$5,230
35	18	14	A. J. Foyt	A. J. Foyt Racing	Oldsmobile	91	1	handling	63	$2,505
36	36	52	Jimmy Means	Jimmy Means Racing	Chevrolet	60	0	engine	55	$5,120
37	28	43	Richard Petty	Petty Enterprises	Pontiac	47	0	engine	52	$5,040
38	23	1	Brett Bodine	Ellington Racing	Chevrolet	32	0	crash	49	$2,240
39	6	26	Morgan Shepherd	King Racing	Buick	10	0	engine	46	$4,180
40	20	8	Bobby Hillin Jr.	Stavola Brothers Racing	Buick	2	0	engine	43	$9,115
Failed to qualify
41		6	Connie Saylor	U.S. Racing	Chevrolet					
Official race results

== Standings after the race ==
Drivers' Championship standings

	Pos	Driver	Points
	1	Dale Earnhardt	2,824
1	2	Bill Elliott	2,394 (-430)
1	3	Terry Labonte	2,318 (-506)
2	4	Neil Bonnett	2,312 (–512)
	5	Kyle Petty	2,254 (–570)
1	6	Darrell Waltrip	2,232 (–592)
1	7	Ken Schrader	2,198 (–626)
	8	Ricky Rudd	2,154 (–670)
1	9	Rusty Wallace	2,130 (–694)
1	10	Richard Petty	2,067 (–757)
Official driver's standings

- Note: Only the first 10 positions are included for the driver standings.

Previous race: 1987 Summer 500	NASCAR Winston Cup Series; 1987 season	Next race: 1987 The Budweiser at The Glen
