= 1987 Miller American 400 =

14th race of the 1987 NASCAR Winston Cup Series

Race details
- Race 14 of 29 in the 1987 NASCAR Winston Cup Series
- The 1987 Miller American 400 program cover.
- Date: June 28, 1987
- Official name: 19th Annual Miller American 400
- Location: Brooklyn, Michigan, Michigan International Speedway
- Course: Permanent racing facility
- Course length: 2 miles (3.2 km)
- Distance: 200 laps, 400 mi (643.737 km)
- Scheduled distance: 200 laps, 400 mi (643.737 km)
- Average speed: 153.551 miles per hour (247.116 km/h)
- Attendance: 78,000

Pole position
Driver	Rusty Wallace	Blue Max Racing
- Time: 42.168

Most laps led
Driver	Dale Earnhardt	Richard Childress Racing
- Laps: 152

Winner
No. 3	Dale Earnhardt	Richard Childress Racing

Television in the United States
- Network: CBS
- Announcers: Ken Squier, Ned Jarrett, Chris Economaki

Radio in the United States
- Radio: Motor Racing Network

The 1987 Miller American 400 was the 14th stock car race of the 1987 NASCAR Winston Cup Series season and the 19th iteration of the event. The race was held on Sunday, June 28, 1987, before an audience of 78,000 in Brooklyn, Michigan, at Michigan International Speedway, a two-mile (3.2 km) moderate-banked D-shaped speedway. The race took the scheduled 200 laps to complete.

By race's end, Richard Childress Racing's Dale Earnhardt dominated a majority of the race, leading 154 laps en route to his 27th career NASCAR Winston Cup Series victory and his seventh victory of the season. With the victory, Earnhardt was able to increase his driver's championship lead over Bill Elliott by 304 points. To fill out the top three, Ranier-Lundy Racing's Davey Allison and Wood Brothers Racing's Kyle Petty finished second and third, respectively.

== Background ==
The layout of Michigan International Speedway, the venue where the race was held.

The race was held at Michigan International Speedway, a two-mile (3.2 km) moderate-banked D-shaped speedway located in Brooklyn, Michigan. The track is used primarily for NASCAR events. It is known as a "sister track" to Texas World Speedway as MIS's oval design was a direct basis of TWS, with moderate modifications to the banking in the corners, and was used as the basis of Auto Club Speedway. The track is owned by International Speedway Corporation. Michigan International Speedway is recognized as one of motorsports' premier facilities because of its wide racing surface and high banking (by open-wheel standards; the 18-degree banking is modest by stock car standards).

=== Entry list ===
- (R) denotes rookie driver.

#	Driver	Team	Make	Sponsor
1	Brett Bodine	Ellington Racing	Buick	Bull's-Eye Barbecue Sauce
3	Dale Earnhardt	Richard Childress Racing	Chevrolet	Wrangler
4	Rick Wilson	Morgan–McClure Motorsports	Oldsmobile	Kodak
04	Charlie Rudolph	Rudolph Racing	Chevrolet	Sunoco
5	Geoff Bodine	Hendrick Motorsports	Chevrolet	Levi Garrett
6	Connie Saylor	U.S. Racing	Chevrolet	Kroger
7	Alan Kulwicki	AK Racing	Ford	Zerex
8	Bobby Hillin Jr.	Stavola Brothers Racing	Buick	Miller American
08	Butch Miller	Throop Racing	Chevrolet	Throop Racing
9	Bill Elliott	Melling Racing	Ford	Coors
11	Terry Labonte	Junior Johnson & Associates	Chevrolet	Budweiser
15	Ricky Rudd	Bud Moore Engineering	Ford	Motorcraft Quality Parts
17	Darrell Waltrip	Hendrick Motorsports	Chevrolet	Tide
18	Dale Jarrett (R)	Freedlander Motorsports	Chevrolet	Freedlander Financial
19	Derrike Cope (R)	Stoke Racing	Chevrolet	Alugard
21	Kyle Petty	Wood Brothers Racing	Ford	Citgo
22	Bobby Allison	Stavola Brothers Racing	Buick	Miller American
25	Tim Richmond	Hendrick Motorsports	Chevrolet	Folgers
26	Morgan Shepherd	King Racing	Buick	Quaker State
27	Rusty Wallace	Blue Max Racing	Pontiac	Kodiak
28	Davey Allison (R)	Ranier-Lundy Racing	Ford	Texaco, Havoline
29	Cale Yarborough	Cale Yarborough Motorsports	Oldsmobile	Hardee's
30	Michael Waltrip	Bahari Racing	Chevrolet	All Pro Auto Parts
33	Harry Gant	Mach 1 Racing	Chevrolet	Skoal Bandit
35	Benny Parsons	Hendrick Motorsports	Chevrolet	Folgers
36	H. B. Bailey	Bailey Racing	Pontiac	Almeda Auto Parts
38	Rickey Hood	Hood Racing	Ford	Hood Racing
43	Richard Petty	Petty Enterprises	Pontiac	STP
44	Sterling Marlin	Hagan Racing	Oldsmobile	Piedmont Airlines
49	Bob Keselowski	Keselowski Racing	Chevrolet	Arnold Jerome Enterprises
50	Greg Sacks	Dingman Brothers Racing	Pontiac	Valvoline
51	David Simko	Simko Racing	Chevrolet	Mound Steel & Supply
52	Jimmy Means	Jimmy Means Racing	Pontiac	Jimmy Means Racing
55	Phil Parsons	Jackson Bros. Motorsports	Oldsmobile	Copenhagen
62	Steve Christman (R)	Winkle Motorsports	Pontiac	AC Spark Plug
64	Rodney Combs	Langley Racing	Ford	Sunny King Ford
67	Buddy Arrington	Arrington Racing	Ford	Pannill Sweatshirts
68	Jerry Holden	Holden Racing	Chevrolet	Altra-Dry
69	Donny Paul	Paul Racing	Chevrolet	Cyclo Automotive
70	J. D. McDuffie	McDuffie Racing	Pontiac	Rumple Furniture
71	Dave Marcis	Marcis Auto Racing	Chevrolet	Helen Rae Special
74	Bobby Wawak	Wawak Racing	Chevrolet	Wawak Racing
75	Neil Bonnett	RahMoc Enterprises	Pontiac	Valvoline
77	Eddie Bierschwale	Ragan Racing	Ford	Ragan Racing
80	Gary Fedewa	Burke Racing	Chevrolet	Burke Racing
81	Mike Potter	Fillip Racing	Ford	Fillip Racing
82	Rick Jeffrey	Jeffrey Racing	Chevrolet	Jeffrey Racing
83	Lake Speed	Speed Racing	Oldsmobile	Wynn's, Kmart
85	Bobby Gerhart	Bobby Gerhart Racing	Chevrolet	James Chevrolet
88	Buddy Baker	Baker–Schiff Racing	Oldsmobile	Crisco
89	Jim Sauter	Mueller Brothers Racing	Pontiac	Evinrude Outboard Motors
90	Ken Schrader	Donlavey Racing	Ford	Red Baron Frozen Pizza
91	Ken Bouchard	Sullivan Racing	Chevrolet	Sullivan Racing

== Qualifying ==
Qualifying was split into two rounds. The first round was held on Saturday, June 27, at 11:30 AM EST. Each driver had one lap to set a time. During the first round, the top 20 drivers in the round were guaranteed a starting spot in the race. If a driver was not able to guarantee a spot in the first round, they had the option to scrub their time from the first round and try and run a faster lap time in a second round qualifying run, held on Saturday, at 2:00 PM EST. As with the first round, each driver had one lap to set a time. For this specific race, positions 21-40 were decided on time, and depending on who needed it, a select amount of positions were given to cars who had not otherwise qualified but were high enough in owner's points; up to two were given.

Rusty Wallace, driving for Blue Max Racing, managed to win the pole, setting a time of 42.168 and an average speed of 170.746 miles per hour (274.789 km/h) in the first round.

12 drivers failed to qualify.

=== Full qualifying results ===
Pos.	#	Driver	Team	Make	Time	Speed
1	27	Rusty Wallace	Blue Max Racing	Pontiac	42.168	170.746
2	19	Derrike Cope (R)	Stoke Racing	Ford	42.275	170.313
3	90	Ken Schrader	Donlavey Racing	Ford	42.289	170.257
4	9	Bill Elliott	Melling Racing	Ford	42.330	170.092
5	11	Terry Labonte	Junior Johnson & Associates	Chevrolet	42.368	169.940
6	3	Dale Earnhardt	Richard Childress Racing	Chevrolet	42.374	169.916
7	22	Bobby Allison	Stavola Brothers Racing	Buick	42.394	169.835
8	28	Davey Allison (R)	Ranier-Lundy Racing	Ford	42.404	169.795
9	88	Buddy Baker	Baker–Schiff Racing	Oldsmobile	42.493	169.440
10	5	Geoff Bodine	Hendrick Motorsports	Chevrolet	42.510	169.372
11	8	Bobby Hillin Jr.	Stavola Brothers Racing	Buick	42.531	169.288
12	4	Rick Wilson	Morgan–McClure Motorsports	Oldsmobile	42.562	169.165
13	55	Phil Parsons	Jackson Bros. Motorsports	Oldsmobile	42.565	169.153
14	17	Darrell Waltrip	Hendrick Motorsports	Chevrolet	42.614	168.959
15	43	Richard Petty	Petty Enterprises	Pontiac	42.723	168.527
16	30	Michael Waltrip	Bahari Racing	Chevrolet	42.726	168.516
17	25	Tim Richmond	Hendrick Motorsports	Chevrolet	42.731	168.496
18	15	Ricky Rudd	Bud Moore Engineering	Ford	42.758	168.390
19	7	Alan Kulwicki	AK Racing	Ford	42.760	168.382
20	33	Harry Gant	Mach 1 Racing	Chevrolet	42.840	168.067
Failed to lock in Round 1
21	26	Morgan Shepherd	King Racing	Buick	42.395	169.831
22	35	Benny Parsons	Hendrick Motorsports	Chevrolet	42.704	168.602
23	21	Kyle Petty	Wood Brothers Racing	Ford	42.869	167.954
24	50	Greg Sacks	Dingman Brothers Racing	Pontiac	42.902	167.824
25	1	Brett Bodine	Ellington Racing	Chevrolet	42.910	167.793
26	29	Cale Yarborough	Cale Yarborough Motorsports	Oldsmobile	42.967	167.570
27	89	Jim Sauter	Mueller Brothers Racing	Pontiac	43.001	167.438
28	6	Connie Saylor	U.S. Racing	Chevrolet	43.033	167.313
29	71	Dave Marcis	Marcis Auto Racing	Chevrolet	43.065	167.189
30	83	Lake Speed	Speed Racing	Oldsmobile	43.192	166.698
31	69	Donny Paul	Paul Racing	Chevrolet	43.222	166.582
32	36	H. B. Bailey	Bailey Racing	Pontiac	43.249	166.478
33	67	Buddy Arrington	Arrington Racing	Ford	43.314	166.228
34	75	Neil Bonnett	RahMoc Enterprises	Pontiac	43.343	166.117
35	77	Eddie Bierschwale	Ragan Racing	Ford	43.398	165.906
36	91	Ken Bouchard	Sullivan Racing	Chevrolet	43.454	165.692
37	08	Butch Miller	Throop Racing	Chevrolet	43.468	165.639
38	18	Dale Jarrett (R)	Freedlander Motorsports	Chevrolet	43.600	165.138
39	51	David Simko	Simko Racing	Chevrolet	43.643	164.975
40	64	Rodney Combs	Langley Racing	Ford	43.801	164.380
41	44	Sterling Marlin	Hagan Racing	Oldsmobile	-	-
Failed to qualify (results unknown)
42	04	Charlie Rudolph	Rudolph Racing	Chevrolet	-*	-*
43	38	Rickey Hood	Hood Racing	Ford	-*	-*
44	49	Bob Keselowski	Keselowski Racing	Chevrolet	-*	-*
45	52	Jimmy Means	Jimmy Means Racing	Pontiac	-*	-*
46	62	Steve Christman (R)	Winkle Motorsports	Pontiac	-*	-*
47	68	Jerry Holden	Holden Racing	Chevrolet	-*	-*
48	70	J. D. McDuffie	McDuffie Racing	Pontiac	-*	-*
49	74	Bobby Wawak	Wawak Racing	Chevrolet	-*	-*
50	80	Gary Fedewa	Burke Racing	Chevrolet	-*	-*
51	81	Mike Potter	Fillip Racing	Ford	-*	-*
52	82	Rick Jeffrey	Jeffrey Racing	Chevrolet	-*	-*
53	85	Bobby Gerhart	Bobby Gerhart Racing	Chevrolet	-*	-*
Official starting lineup

== Race results ==
Fin	St	#	Driver	Team	Make	Laps	Led	Status	Pts	Winnings
1	6	3	Dale Earnhardt	Richard Childress Racing	Chevrolet	200	152	running	185	$60,250
2	8	28	Davey Allison (R)	Ranier-Lundy Racing	Ford	200	0	running	170	$27,575
3	23	21	Kyle Petty	Wood Brothers Racing	Ford	200	0	running	165	$26,025
4	17	25	Tim Richmond	Hendrick Motorsports	Chevrolet	200	7	running	165	$13,175
5	1	27	Rusty Wallace	Blue Max Racing	Pontiac	200	15	running	160	$25,150
6	11	8	Bobby Hillin Jr.	Stavola Brothers Racing	Buick	200	0	running	150	$16,100
7	14	17	Darrell Waltrip	Hendrick Motorsports	Chevrolet	199	0	running	146	$10,655
8	3	90	Ken Schrader	Donlavey Racing	Ford	199	3	running	147	$14,245
9	22	35	Benny Parsons	Hendrick Motorsports	Chevrolet	199	0	running	138	$16,500
10	30	83	Lake Speed	Speed Racing	Oldsmobile	199	0	running	134	$7,475
11	10	5	Geoff Bodine	Hendrick Motorsports	Chevrolet	199	0	running	130	$12,625
12	15	43	Richard Petty	Petty Enterprises	Pontiac	199	0	running	127	$9,425
13	20	33	Harry Gant	Mach 1 Racing	Chevrolet	199	0	running	124	$8,965
14	18	15	Ricky Rudd	Bud Moore Engineering	Ford	199	0	running	121	$12,950
15	29	71	Dave Marcis	Marcis Auto Racing	Chevrolet	199	0	running	118	$8,505
16	9	88	Buddy Baker	Baker–Schiff Racing	Oldsmobile	199	0	running	115	$3,975
17	34	75	Neil Bonnett	RahMoc Enterprises	Pontiac	198	1	running	117	$7,585
18	41	44	Sterling Marlin	Hagan Racing	Oldsmobile	198	0	running	109	$7,200
19	35	77	Eddie Bierschwale	Ragan Racing	Ford	197	0	running	0	$3,310
20	38	18	Dale Jarrett (R)	Freedlander Motorsports	Chevrolet	197	0	running	103	$7,060
21	13	55	Phil Parsons	Jackson Bros. Motorsports	Oldsmobile	196	0	running	100	$3,450
22	25	1	Brett Bodine	Ellington Racing	Chevrolet	196	0	running	97	$2,835
23	40	64	Rodney Combs	Langley Racing	Ford	196	0	running	94	$5,930
24	27	89	Jim Sauter	Mueller Brothers Racing	Pontiac	195	0	running	91	$2,615
25	21	26	Morgan Shepherd	King Racing	Buick	194	3	running	93	$5,650
26	39	51	David Simko	Simko Racing	Chevrolet	194	0	running	85	$2,420
27	7	22	Bobby Allison	Stavola Brothers Racing	Buick	193	0	running	82	$9,360
28	5	11	Terry Labonte	Junior Johnson & Associates	Chevrolet	192	0	running	79	$11,100
29	24	50	Greg Sacks	Dingman Brothers Racing	Pontiac	189	0	running	76	$2,230
30	12	4	Rick Wilson	Morgan–McClure Motorsports	Oldsmobile	169	0	engine	73	$2,180
31	19	7	Alan Kulwicki	AK Racing	Ford	163	0	engine	70	$5,900
32	36	91	Ken Bouchard	Sullivan Racing	Chevrolet	158	0	oil pressure	67	$2,075
33	26	29	Cale Yarborough	Cale Yarborough Motorsports	Oldsmobile	130	0	brakes	64	$2,025
34	4	9	Bill Elliott	Melling Racing	Ford	126	19	engine	66	$12,050
35	31	69	Donny Paul	Paul Racing	Chevrolet	104	0	engine	58	$1,915
36	37	08	Butch Miller	Throop Racing	Chevrolet	90	0	engine	0	$1,885
37	33	67	Buddy Arrington	Arrington Racing	Ford	83	0	engine	52	$4,650
38	28	6	Connie Saylor	U.S. Racing	Chevrolet	63	0	engine	0	$4,640
39	16	30	Michael Waltrip	Bahari Racing	Chevrolet	62	0	engine	46	$4,620
40	32	36	H. B. Bailey	Bailey Racing	Pontiac	32	0	crash	43	$1,875
41	2	19	Derrike Cope (R)	Stoke Racing	Ford	0	0	did not start	0	$0
Failed to qualify (results unknown)
42		04	Charlie Rudolph	Rudolph Racing	Chevrolet					
43		38	Rickey Hood	Hood Racing	Ford					
44		49	Bob Keselowski	Keselowski Racing	Chevrolet					
45		52	Jimmy Means	Jimmy Means Racing	Pontiac					
46		62	Steve Christman (R)	Winkle Motorsports	Pontiac					
47		68	Jerry Holden	Holden Racing	Chevrolet					
48		70	J. D. McDuffie	McDuffie Racing	Pontiac					
49		74	Bobby Wawak	Wawak Racing	Chevrolet					
50		80	Gary Fedewa	Burke Racing	Chevrolet					
51		81	Mike Potter	Fillip Racing	Ford					
52		82	Rick Jeffrey	Jeffrey Racing	Chevrolet					
53		85	Bobby Gerhart	Bobby Gerhart Racing	Chevrolet					
Official race results

== Standings after the race ==
Drivers' Championship standings

	Pos	Driver	Points
	1	Dale Earnhardt	2,314
	2	Bill Elliott	2,010 (-304)
	3	Neil Bonnett	1,985 (-329)
1	4	Kyle Petty	1,891 (–423)
1	5	Terry Labonte	1,869 (–445)
	6	Ricky Rudd	1,825 (–489)
1	7	Darrell Waltrip	1,801 (–513)
1	8	Ken Schrader	1,799 (–515)
2	9	Richard Petty	1,788 (–526)
1	10	Rusty Wallace	1,710 (–604)
Official driver's standings

- Note: Only the first 10 positions are included for the driver standings.

Previous race: 1987 Budweiser 400	NASCAR Winston Cup Series; 1987 season	Next race: 1987 Pepsi Firecracker 400
