= 1987 Pepsi Firecracker 400 =

15th race of the 1987 NASCAR Winston Cup Series

Race details
- Race 15 of 29 in the 1987 NASCAR Winston Cup Series
- The 1987 Pepsi Firecracker 400 program cover.
- Date: July 4, 1987
- Official name: 29th Annual Pepsi Firecracker 400
- Location: Daytona Beach, Florida, Daytona International Speedway
- Course: Permanent racing facility
- Course length: 4.0 km (2.5 miles)
- Distance: 160 laps, 400 mi (643.737 km)
- Scheduled distance: 160 laps, 400 mi (643.737 km)
- Average speed: 161.074 miles per hour (259.223 km/h)
- Attendance: 85,000

Pole position
Driver	Davey Allison	Ranier-Lundy Racing
- Time: 45.435

Most laps led
Driver	Ken Schrader; Davey Allison	Donlavey Racing; Ranier-Lundy Racing
- Laps: 32

Winner
No. 22	Bobby Allison	Stavola Brothers Racing

Television in the United States
- Network: ABC
- Announcers: Keith Jackson, Donnie Allison

Radio in the United States
- Radio: Motor Racing Network

The 1987 Pepsi Firecracker 400 was the 15th stock car race of the 1987 NASCAR Winston Cup Series season and the 29th iteration of the event. The race was held on Saturday, July 4, 1987, before an audience of 85,000 in Daytona Beach, Florida at Daytona International Speedway, a 2.5 miles (4.0 km) permanent triangular-shaped superspeedway. The race took the scheduled 160 laps to complete.

In what is considered to be one of the most confusing finishes in NASCAR history, Stavola Brothers Racing's Bobby Allison managed to pass 12 cars in the span of five laps heading into the final lap of the race. Mistakenly, Allison was scored a lap down by the time the final lap started both on the track and by commentators; as a result, drivers behind Allison at the time, which included owner-drivers Buddy Baker and Dave Marcis, let Allison increase his gap between them as most thought Allison was a lap down. By the time the error was realized, Allison had a four second lead over Baker, taking the victory while drivers behind them wrecked for what they thought was the presumed battle for the lead. The victory was Allison's 83rd career NASCAR Winston Cup Series victory and his only victory of the season. To fill out the top three, the aforementioned Baker and Marcis finished second and third, respectively.

== Background ==
The layout of Daytona International Speedway, the venue where the race was held.

Daytona International Speedway is one of three superspeedways to hold NASCAR races, the other two being Indianapolis Motor Speedway and Talladega Superspeedway. The standard track at Daytona International Speedway is a four-turn superspeedway that is 2.5 miles (4.0 km) long. The track's turns are banked at 31 degrees, while the front stretch, the location of the finish line, is banked at 18 degrees.

=== Entry list ===
- (R) denotes rookie driver.

#	Driver	Team	Make	Sponsor
0	Delma Cowart	H. L. Waters Racing	Chevrolet	Heyward Grooms Construction
1	Brett Bodine	Ellington Racing	Buick	Bull's-Eye Barbecue Sauce
01	Dave Pletcher Sr.	Weaver Racing	Ford	Ernie Haire Ford
3	Dale Earnhardt	Richard Childress Racing	Chevrolet	Wrangler
4	Rick Wilson	Morgan–McClure Motorsports	Oldsmobile	Kodak
5	Geoff Bodine	Hendrick Motorsports	Chevrolet	Levi Garrett
6	Connie Saylor	U.S. Racing	Chevrolet	Kroger
7	Alan Kulwicki	AK Racing	Ford	Zerex
8	Bobby Hillin Jr.	Stavola Brothers Racing	Buick	Miller American
9	Bill Elliott	Melling Racing	Ford	Coors
11	Terry Labonte	Junior Johnson & Associates	Chevrolet	Budweiser
12	Larry Pollard	Hamby Racing	Chevrolet	Hamby Racing
14	A. J. Foyt	A. J. Foyt Racing	Oldsmobile	Copenhagen
15	Ricky Rudd	Bud Moore Engineering	Ford	Motorcraft Quality Parts
17	Darrell Waltrip	Hendrick Motorsports	Chevrolet	Tide
18	Dale Jarrett (R)	Freedlander Motorsports	Chevrolet	Freedlander Financial
21	Kyle Petty	Wood Brothers Racing	Ford	Citgo
22	Bobby Allison	Stavola Brothers Racing	Buick	Miller American
25	Tim Richmond	Hendrick Motorsports	Chevrolet	Folgers
26	Morgan Shepherd	King Racing	Buick	Quaker State
27	Rusty Wallace	Blue Max Racing	Pontiac	Kodiak
28	Davey Allison (R)	Ranier-Lundy Racing	Ford	Texaco, Havoline
29	Cale Yarborough	Cale Yarborough Motorsports	Oldsmobile	Hardee's
30	Michael Waltrip	Bahari Racing	Chevrolet	All Pro Auto Parts
33	Harry Gant	Mach 1 Racing	Chevrolet	Skoal Bandit
35	Benny Parsons	Hendrick Motorsports	Chevrolet	Folgers
39	Blackie Wangerin	Wangerin Racing	Ford	Wangerin Racing
43	Richard Petty	Petty Enterprises	Pontiac	STP
44	Sterling Marlin	Hagan Racing	Oldsmobile	Piedmont Airlines
48	Tony Spanos	Hylton Motorsports	Chevrolet	Hylton Motorsports
50	Greg Sacks	Dingman Brothers Racing	Pontiac	Valvoline
52	Jimmy Means	Jimmy Means Racing	Pontiac	Jimmy Means Racing
55	Phil Parsons	Jackson Bros. Motorsports	Oldsmobile	Copenhagen
62	Steve Christman (R)	Winkle Motorsports	Pontiac	AC Spark Plug
64	Rodney Combs	Langley Racing	Ford	Sunny King Ford
67	Buddy Arrington	Arrington Racing	Ford	Pannill Sweatshirts
70	J. D. McDuffie	McDuffie Racing	Pontiac	Rumple Furniture
71	Dave Marcis	Marcis Auto Racing	Chevrolet	Lifebuoy
73	Phil Barkdoll	Barkdoll Racing	Chevrolet	Helen Rae Special
74	Bobby Wawak	Wawak Racing	Chevrolet	Wawak Racing
75	Neil Bonnett	RahMoc Enterprises	Pontiac	Valvoline
77	Eddie Bierschwale	Ragan Racing	Ford	Ragan Racing
81	Chet Fillip	Fillip Racing	Ford	Warr Valves
82	Mark Stahl	Stahl Racing	Ford	Auto Bell Car Wash
83	Lake Speed	Speed Racing	Oldsmobile	Wynn's, Kmart
88	Buddy Baker	Baker–Schiff Racing	Oldsmobile	Crisco
90	Ken Schrader	Donlavey Racing	Ford	Red Baron Frozen Pizza
98	Ed Pimm	Curb Racing	Buick	Sunoco
99	Brad Teague	Ball Motorsports	Chevrolet	Slender You Figure Salons

== Qualifying ==
Qualifying was split into two rounds. The first round was held on Thursday, July 2, at 10:00 AM EST. Each driver had one lap to set a time. During the first round, the top 20 drivers in the round were guaranteed a starting spot in the race. If a driver was not able to guarantee a spot in the first round, they had the option to scrub their time from the first round and try and run a faster lap time in a second round qualifying run, held on Friday, July 3, at 11:00 AM EST. As with the first round, each driver had one lap to set a time. For this specific race, positions 21-40 were decided on time, and depending on who needed it, a select amount of positions were given to cars who had not otherwise qualified but were high enough in owner's points; up to two provisionals were given.

Davey Allison, driving for Ranier-Lundy Racing, managed to win the pole, setting a time of 45.435 and an average speed of 198.085 miles per hour (318.787 km/h) in the first round.

Four drivers failed to qualify.

=== Full qualifying results ===
Pos.	#	Driver	Team	Make	Time	Speed
1	28	Davey Allison (R)	Ranier-Lundy Racing	Ford	45.435	198.085
2	9	Bill Elliott	Melling Racing	Ford	45.443	198.050
3	90	Ken Schrader	Donlavey Racing	Ford	45.545	197.607
4	26	Morgan Shepherd	King Racing	Buick	45.661	197.105
5	11	Terry Labonte	Junior Johnson & Associates	Chevrolet	45.762	196.670
6	27	Rusty Wallace	Blue Max Racing	Pontiac	45.849	196.297
7	1	Brett Bodine	Ellington Racing	Buick	45.932	195.942
8	14	A. J. Foyt	A. J. Foyt Racing	Oldsmobile	45.973	195.767
9	88	Buddy Baker	Baker–Schiff Racing	Oldsmobile	45.973	195.767
10	75	Neil Bonnett	RahMoc Enterprises	Pontiac	46.013	195.597
11	22	Bobby Allison	Stavola Brothers Racing	Buick	46.025	195.546
12	21	Kyle Petty	Wood Brothers Racing	Ford	46.035	195.503
13	3	Dale Earnhardt	Richard Childress Racing	Chevrolet	46.070	195.355
14	8	Bobby Hillin Jr.	Stavola Brothers Racing	Buick	46.093	195.257
15	7	Alan Kulwicki	AK Racing	Ford	46.094	195.253
16	33	Harry Gant	Mach 1 Racing	Chevrolet	46.144	195.042
17	15	Ricky Rudd	Bud Moore Engineering	Ford	46.181	194.885
18	44	Sterling Marlin	Hagan Racing	Oldsmobile	46.210	194.763
19	5	Geoff Bodine	Hendrick Motorsports	Chevrolet	46.294	194.410
20	30	Michael Waltrip	Bahari Racing	Chevrolet	46.309	194.347
Failed to lock in Round 1
21	43	Richard Petty	Petty Enterprises	Pontiac	46.407	193.936
22	83	Lake Speed	Speed Racing	Oldsmobile	46.434	193.823
23	25	Tim Richmond	Hendrick Motorsports	Chevrolet	46.462	193.707
24	99	Brad Teague	Ball Motorsports	Chevrolet	46.467	193.686
25	67	Buddy Arrington	Arrington Racing	Ford	46.504	193.532
26	17	Darrell Waltrip	Hendrick Motorsports	Chevrolet	46.537	193.395
27	29	Cale Yarborough	Cale Yarborough Motorsports	Oldsmobile	46.537	193.395
28	71	Dave Marcis	Marcis Auto Racing	Chevrolet	46.570	193.257
29	4	Rick Wilson	Morgan–McClure Motorsports	Oldsmobile	46.604	193.116
30	77	Eddie Bierschwale	Ragan Racing	Ford	46.613	193.079
31	82	Mark Stahl	Stahl Racing	Ford	46.658	192.893
32	12	Larry Pollard	Hamby Racing	Chevrolet	46.678	192.810
33	35	Benny Parsons	Hendrick Motorsports	Chevrolet	46.682	192.794
34	98	Ed Pimm	Curb Racing	Buick	46.712	192.670
35	64	Rodney Combs	Langley Racing	Ford	46.728	192.604
36	01	Dave Pletcher Sr.	Weaver Racing	Ford	46.777	192.402
37	50	Greg Sacks	Dingman Brothers Racing	Pontiac	46.873	192.008
38	81	Chet Fillip	Fillip Racing	Ford	46.947	191.706
39	52	Jimmy Means	Jimmy Means Racing	Chevrolet	46.959	191.657
40	55	Phil Parsons	Jackson Bros. Motorsports	Oldsmobile	47.024	191.392
Provisional
41	18	Dale Jarrett (R)	Freedlander Motorsports	Chevrolet	47.472	189.585
Failed to qualify
42	74	Bobby Wawak	Wawak Racing	Chevrolet	47.049	191.290
43	70	J. D. McDuffie	McDuffie Racing	Pontiac	47.576	189.171
44	48	Tony Spanos	Hylton Motorsports	Chevrolet	47.967	187.629
45	62	Steve Christman (R)	Winkle Motorsports	Pontiac	48.182	186.792
46	0	Delma Cowart	H. L. Waters Racing	Chevrolet	48.290	186.374
47	73	Phil Barkdoll	Barkdoll Racing	Chevrolet	48.301	186.332
48	39	Blackie Wangerin	Wangerin Racing	Ford	48.909	184.015
49	6	Connie Saylor	U.S. Racing	Chevrolet	-	-
Official first round qualifying results
Official starting lineup

== Race results ==
Fin	St	#	Driver	Team	Make	Laps	Led	Status	Pts	Winnings
1	11	22	Bobby Allison	Stavola Brothers Racing	Buick	160	2	running	180	$57,375
2	9	88	Buddy Baker	Baker–Schiff Racing	Oldsmobile	160	1	running	175	$30,800
3	28	71	Dave Marcis	Marcis Auto Racing	Chevrolet	160	23	running	170	$27,805
4	26	17	Darrell Waltrip	Hendrick Motorsports	Chevrolet	160	6	running	165	$17,470
5	4	26	Morgan Shepherd	King Racing	Buick	160	0	running	155	$17,130
6	13	3	Dale Earnhardt	Richard Childress Racing	Chevrolet	160	22	running	155	$22,160
7	3	90	Ken Schrader	Donlavey Racing	Ford	160	32	running	156	$15,850
8	6	27	Rusty Wallace	Blue Max Racing	Pontiac	160	5	running	147	$15,760
9	16	33	Harry Gant	Mach 1 Racing	Chevrolet	160	0	running	138	$10,315
10	5	11	Terry Labonte	Junior Johnson & Associates	Chevrolet	160	3	running	139	$16,135
11	7	1	Brett Bodine	Ellington Racing	Buick	160	1	running	135	$6,025
12	2	9	Bill Elliott	Melling Racing	Ford	160	30	running	132	$16,990
13	14	8	Bobby Hillin Jr.	Stavola Brothers Racing	Buick	159	0	running	124	$11,670
14	17	15	Ricky Rudd	Bud Moore Engineering	Ford	159	0	running	121	$12,855
15	40	55	Phil Parsons	Jackson Bros. Motorsports	Oldsmobile	159	0	running	118	$4,490
16	18	44	Sterling Marlin	Hagan Racing	Oldsmobile	159	0	running	115	$7,870
17	12	21	Kyle Petty	Wood Brothers Racing	Ford	158	0	running	112	$10,830
18	10	75	Neil Bonnett	RahMoc Enterprises	Pontiac	158	0	running	109	$7,305
19	20	30	Michael Waltrip	Bahari Racing	Chevrolet	158	0	running	106	$6,845
20	1	28	Davey Allison (R)	Ranier-Lundy Racing	Ford	157	32	running	113	$10,480
21	38	81	Chet Fillip	Fillip Racing	Ford	157	0	running	100	$3,130
22	23	25	Tim Richmond	Hendrick Motorsports	Chevrolet	157	3	running	102	$3,330
23	41	18	Dale Jarrett (R)	Freedlander Motorsports	Chevrolet	156	0	running	94	$6,110
24	27	29	Cale Yarborough	Cale Yarborough Motorsports	Oldsmobile	155	0	engine	91	$2,805
25	37	50	Greg Sacks	Dingman Brothers Racing	Pontiac	155	0	running	88	$2,805
26	21	43	Richard Petty	Petty Enterprises	Pontiac	155	0	running	85	$5,650
27	32	12	Larry Pollard	Hamby Racing	Chevrolet	155	0	running	0	$5,280
28	25	67	Buddy Arrington	Arrington Racing	Ford	154	0	running	79	$5,870
29	39	52	Jimmy Means	Jimmy Means Racing	Chevrolet	154	0	running	76	$5,060
30	29	4	Rick Wilson	Morgan–McClure Motorsports	Oldsmobile	152	0	crash	73	$3,955
31	35	64	Rodney Combs	Langley Racing	Ford	126	0	engine	70	$4,890
32	15	7	Alan Kulwicki	AK Racing	Ford	120	0	engine	67	$5,130
33	30	77	Eddie Bierschwale	Ragan Racing	Ford	117	0	running	64	$2,105
34	34	98	Ed Pimm	Curb Racing	Buick	110	0	engine	61	$2,080
35	33	35	Benny Parsons	Hendrick Motorsports	Chevrolet	109	0	fatigue	58	$11,255
36	36	01	Dave Pletcher Sr.	Weaver Racing	Ford	65	0	engine	55	$2,030
37	31	82	Mark Stahl	Stahl Racing	Ford	59	0	wheel bearing	52	$2,005
38	8	14	A. J. Foyt	A. J. Foyt Racing	Oldsmobile	28	0	transmission	49	$1,980
39	19	5	Geoff Bodine	Hendrick Motorsports	Chevrolet	17	0	overheating	46	$8,955
40	22	83	Lake Speed	Speed Racing	Oldsmobile	10	0	fuel pump	43	$1,930
41	24	99	Brad Teague	Ball Motorsports	Chevrolet	5	0	crash	40	$1,930
Failed to qualify
42		74	Bobby Wawak	Wawak Racing	Chevrolet					
43		70	J. D. McDuffie	McDuffie Racing	Pontiac					
44		48	Tony Spanos	Hylton Motorsports	Chevrolet					
45		62	Steve Christman (R)	Winkle Motorsports	Pontiac					
46		0	Delma Cowart	H. L. Waters Racing	Chevrolet					
47		73	Phil Barkdoll	Barkdoll Racing	Chevrolet					
48		39	Blackie Wangerin	Wangerin Racing	Ford					
49		6	Connie Saylor	U.S. Racing	Chevrolet					
Official race results

== Standings after the race ==
Drivers' Championship standings

	Pos	Driver	Points
	1	Dale Earnhardt	2,469
	2	Bill Elliott	2,142 (-327)
	3	Neil Bonnett	2,094 (-375)
1	4	Terry Labonte	2,008 (–461)
1	5	Kyle Petty	2,003 (–466)
1	6	Darrell Waltrip	1,966 (–503)
1	7	Ken Schrader	1,955 (–514)
2	8	Ricky Rudd	1,946 (–523)
	9	Richard Petty	1,873 (–596)
	10	Rusty Wallace	1,857 (–612)
Official driver's standings

- Note: Only the first 10 positions are included for the driver standings.

Previous race: 1987 Miller American 400	NASCAR Winston Cup Series; 1987 season	Next race: 1987 Summer 500
