= 1986 Firecracker 400 =

15th race of the 1986 NASCAR Winston Cup Series

1986 Pepsi Firecracker 400
Race details
- Race 15 of 29 in the 1986 NASCAR Winston Cup Series
- The 1986 Firecracker 400 program cover.
- Date: July 4, 1986
- Official name: 28th Annual Firecracker 400
- Location: Daytona Beach, Florida, Daytona International Speedway
- Course: Permanent racing facility
- Course length: 2.5 miles (4.0 km)
- Distance: 160 laps, 400 mi (643.737 km)
- Average speed: 131.916 miles per hour (212.298 km/h)
- Attendance: 65,000

Pole position
Driver	Cale Yarborough	Ranier-Lundy Racing
- Time: 44.222

Most laps led
Driver	Dale Earnhardt	Richard Childress Racing
- Laps: 69

Winner
No. 25	Tim Richmond	Hendrick Motorsports

Television in the United States
- Network: ABC
- Announcers: Al Trautwig, Sam Posey

Radio in the United States
- Radio: Motor Racing Network

The 1986 Firecracker 400 was the 15th stock car race of the 1986 NASCAR Winston Cup Series and the 28th iteration of the event. The race was held on Friday, July 4, 1986, before an audience of 65,000 in Daytona Beach, Florida at Daytona International Speedway, a 2.5 miles (4.0 km) permanent triangular-shaped superspeedway. The race took the scheduled 160 laps to complete.

With eight laps left in the race, Dale Earnhardt blew an engine in front of the leader, Buddy Baker. Although Baker was able to avoid the wreck, in the race back to the line, Hendrick Motorsports' Tim Richmond was able to take the lead at the time of caution. On the final restart with three laps left, Richmond was able to hold off the field, securing his seventh career NASCAR Winston Cup Series victory and his second victory of the season. To fill out the top three, Ellington Racing's Sterling Marlin and Stavola Brothers Racing's Bobby Hillin Jr. finished second and third, respectively.

== Background ==
The layout of Daytona International Speedway, the venue where the race was held.

Daytona International Speedway is one of three superspeedways to hold NASCAR races, the other two being Indianapolis Motor Speedway and Talladega Superspeedway. The standard track at Daytona International Speedway is a four-turn superspeedway that is 2.5 miles (4.0 km) long. The track's turns are banked at 31 degrees, while the front stretch, the location of the finish line, is banked at 18 degrees.

=== Entry list ===
- (R) denotes rookie driver.

#	Driver	Team	Make	Sponsor
0	Doug Heveron	H. L. Waters Racing	Chevrolet	Heyward Grooms Construction
1	Sterling Marlin	Ellington Racing	Chevrolet	Bull's-Eye Barbecue Sauce
2	Rodney Combs	Harrington Racing	Chevrolet	Soldier Seal, Gunk
3	Dale Earnhardt	Richard Childress Racing	Chevrolet	Wrangler
4	Rick Wilson	Morgan–McClure Motorsports	Oldsmobile	Kodak
5	Geoff Bodine	Hendrick Motorsports	Chevrolet	Levi Garrett
6	Jim Sauter	U.S. Racing	Chevrolet	Finky's
7	Kyle Petty	Wood Brothers Racing	Ford	7-Eleven
8	Bobby Hillin Jr.	Stavola Brothers Racing	Chevrolet	Miller American
9	Bill Elliott	Melling Racing	Ford	Coors
10	Greg Sacks	DiGard Motorsports	Chevrolet	TRW Automotive
11	Darrell Waltrip	Junior Johnson & Associates	Chevrolet	Budweiser
12	Neil Bonnett	Junior Johnson & Associates	Chevrolet	Budweiser
14	A. J. Foyt	A. J. Foyt Racing	Oldsmobile	Copenhagen
15	Ricky Rudd	Bud Moore Engineering	Ford	Motorcraft Quality Parts
17	Pancho Carter	Hamby Racing	Chevrolet	Kmart
18	Tommy Ellis	Freedlander Motorsports	Chevrolet	Freedlander Financial
20	Rick Newsom	Newsom Racing	Chevrolet	Newsom Racing
22	Bobby Allison	Stavola Brothers Racing	Buick	Miller American
23	Michael Waltrip (R)	Bahari Racing	Pontiac	Hawaiian Punch
25	Tim Richmond	Hendrick Motorsports	Chevrolet	Folgers
26	Joe Ruttman	King Racing	Buick	Quaker State
27	Rusty Wallace	Blue Max Racing	Pontiac	Alugard
28	Cale Yarborough	Ranier-Lundy Racing	Ford	Hardee's
29	Grant Adcox	Adcox Racing	Chevrolet	Adcox Racing
33	Harry Gant	Mach 1 Racing	Chevrolet	Skoal Bandit
35	Alan Kulwicki (R)	Terry Motorsports	Ford	Quincy's Steakhouse
39	Blackie Wangerin	Wangerin Racing	Ford	Wangerin Racing
41	Ronnie Thomas	Ronnie Thomas Racing	Chevrolet	Ronnie Thomas Racing
43	Richard Petty	Petty Enterprises	Pontiac	STP
44	Terry Labonte	Hagan Enterprises	Oldsmobile	Piedmont Airlines
47	Morgan Shepherd	Race Hill Farm Team	Chevrolet	Race Hill Farm Team
48	James Hylton	Hylton Motorsports	Chevrolet	Hylton Motorsports
52	Jimmy Means	Jimmy Means Racing	Pontiac	Jimmy Means Racing
54	Eddie Bierschwale	Gray Racing	Chevrolet	Kodak
55	Benny Parsons	Jackson Bros. Motorsports	Oldsmobile	Copenhagen
64	Connie Saylor	Langley Racing	Ford	Sunny King Ford
66	Phil Parsons	Jackson Bros. Motorsports	Oldsmobile	Skoal
67	Buddy Arrington	Arrington Racing	Ford	Pannill Sweatshirts
70	J. D. McDuffie	McDuffie Racing	Pontiac	Rumple Furniture
71	Dave Marcis	Marcis Auto Racing	Pontiac	Helen Rae Special
73	Phil Barkdoll	Barkdoll Racing	Ford	Helen Rae Special
75	Jody Ridley	RahMoc Enterprises	Pontiac	Nationwise Automotive
77	Ken Ragan	Ragan Racing	Chevrolet	McCord Gasket
81	Chet Fillip (R)	Fillip Racing	Ford	Circle Bar Truck Corral
88	Buddy Baker	Baker–Schiff Racing	Oldsmobile	Evinrude Outboard Motors
90	Ken Schrader	Donlavey Racing	Ford	Red Baron Frozen Pizza
98	Ron Bouchard	Curb Racing	Pontiac	Valvoline
99	Brad Teague	Ball Motorsports	Chevrolet	Ball Motorsports

== Qualifying ==
Qualifying was split into two rounds. The first round was held on Wednesday, July 2, at 10:00 AM EST. Each driver had one lap to set a time. During the first round, the top 20 drivers in the round were guaranteed a starting spot in the race. If a driver was not able to guarantee a spot in the first round, they had the option to scrub their time from the first round and try and run a faster lap time in a second round qualifying run, held on Thursday, July 3, at 10:00 AM EST. As with the first round, each driver had one lap to set a time. For this specific race, positions 21-40 were decided on time, and depending on who needed it, a select amount of positions were given to cars who had not otherwise qualified but were high enough in owner's points; up to two provisionals were given.

Cale Yarborough, driving for Ranier-Lundy Racing, won the pole, setting a time of 44.222 and an average speed of 203.519 miles per hour (327.532 km/h) in the first round.

Seven drivers failed to qualify.

=== Full qualifying results ===
Pos.	#	Driver	Team	Make	Time	Speed
1	28	Cale Yarborough	Ranier-Lundy Racing	Ford	44.222	203.519
2	9	Bill Elliott	Melling Racing	Ford	44.240	203.436
3	88	Buddy Baker	Baker–Schiff Racing	Oldsmobile	44.426	202.584
4	55	Benny Parsons	Jackson Bros. Motorsports	Oldsmobile	44.450	202.475
5	3	Dale Earnhardt	Richard Childress Racing	Chevrolet	44.526	202.129
6	22	Bobby Allison	Stavola Brothers Racing	Buick	44.619	201.708
7	47	Morgan Shepherd	Race Hill Farm Team	Buick	44.740	201.162
8	8	Bobby Hillin Jr.	Stavola Brothers Racing	Buick	44.748	201.126
9	25	Tim Richmond	Hendrick Motorsports	Chevrolet	44.867	200.593
10	18	Tommy Ellis	Freedlander Motorsports	Chevrolet	44.873	200.566
11	66	Phil Parsons	Jackson Bros. Motorsports	Oldsmobile	45.037	199.836
12	27	Rusty Wallace	Blue Max Racing	Pontiac	45.047	199.791
13	7	Kyle Petty	Wood Brothers Racing	Ford	45.112	199.503
14	44	Terry Labonte	Hagan Enterprises	Oldsmobile	45.137	199.393
15	14	A. J. Foyt	A. J. Foyt Racing	Oldsmobile	45.158	199.300
16	98	Ron Bouchard	Curb Racing	Pontiac	45.238	198.948
17	12	Neil Bonnett	Junior Johnson & Associates	Chevrolet	45.255	198.873
18	5	Geoff Bodine	Hendrick Motorsports	Chevrolet	45.310	198.632
19	43	Richard Petty	Petty Enterprises	Pontiac	45.357	198.426
20	2	Rodney Combs	Harrington Racing	Chevrolet	45.376	198.343
Failed to lock in Round 1
21	1	Sterling Marlin	Ellington Racing	Chevrolet	44.190	203.666
22	75	Jody Ridley	RahMoc Enterprises	Pontiac	44.755	201.095
23	11	Darrell Waltrip	Junior Johnson & Associates	Chevrolet	45.008	199.964
24	81	Chet Fillip (R)	Fillip Racing	Ford	45.027	199.880
25	4	Rick Wilson	Morgan–McClure Motorsports	Oldsmobile	45.030	199.867
26	33	Harry Gant	Mach 1 Racing	Chevrolet	45.152	199.327
27	17	Pancho Carter	Hamby Racing	Chevrolet	45.299	198.680
28	77	Ken Ragan	Ragan Racing	Chevrolet	45.315	198.610
29	26	Joe Ruttman	King Racing	Buick	45.377	198.338
30	71	Dave Marcis	Marcis Auto Racing	Pontiac	45.412	198.186
31	54	Eddie Bierschwale	Gray Racing	Chevrolet	45.432	198.098
32	35	Alan Kulwicki (R)	AK Racing	Ford	45.459	197.981
33	15	Ricky Rudd	Bud Moore Engineering	Ford	45.463	197.963
34	0	Doug Heveron	H. L. Waters Racing	Chevrolet	45.489	197.850
35	67	Buddy Arrington	Arrington Racing	Ford	45.554	197.568
36	10	Greg Sacks	DiGard Motorsports	Chevrolet	45.565	197.520
37	52	Jimmy Means	Jimmy Means Racing	Pontiac	45.607	197.338
38	90	Ken Schrader	Donlavey Racing	Ford	45.664	197.092
39	23	Michael Waltrip (R)	Bahari Racing	Pontiac	45.684	197.006
40	29	Grant Adcox	Adcox Racing	Chevrolet	45.687	196.993
Provisionals
41	6	Jim Sauter	U.S. Racing	Chevrolet	-*	-*
42	64	Connie Saylor	Langley Racing	Ford	-*	-*
Failed to qualify
43	73	Phil Barkdoll	Barkdoll Racing	Ford	-*	-*
44	48	James Hylton	Hylton Motorsports	Chevrolet	-*	-*
45	20	Rick Newsom	Newsom Racing	Chevrolet	-*	-*
46	99	Brad Teague	Ball Motorsports	Chevrolet	-*	-*
47	41	Ronnie Thomas	Ronnie Thomas Racing	Chevrolet	-*	-*
48	39	Blackie Wangerin	Wangerin Racing	Ford	-*	-*
49	70	J. D. McDuffie	McDuffie Racing	Pontiac	-*	-*
Official first round qualifying results
Official starting lineup

== Race results ==
Fin	St	#	Driver	team	Make	Laps	Led	Status	Pts	Winnings
1	9	25	Tim Richmond	Hendrick Motorsports	Chevrolet	160	18	running	180	$58,655
2	21	1	Sterling Marlin	Ellington Racing	Chevrolet	160	6	running	175	$37,700
3	8	8	Bobby Hillin Jr.	Stavola Brothers Racing	Buick	160	0	running	165	$24,545
4	23	11	Darrell Waltrip	Junior Johnson & Associates	Chevrolet	160	2	running	165	$24,750
5	13	7	Kyle Petty	Wood Brothers Racing	Ford	160	4	running	160	$19,725
6	33	15	Ricky Rudd	Bud Moore Engineering	Ford	160	0	running	150	$17,200
7	29	26	Joe Ruttman	King Racing	Buick	160	0	running	146	$12,300
8	12	27	Rusty Wallace	Blue Max Racing	Pontiac	160	0	running	142	$14,150
9	11	66	Phil Parsons	Jackson Bros. Motorsports	Oldsmobile	160	0	running	138	$7,600
10	32	35	Alan Kulwicki (R)	AK Racing	Ford	160	0	running	134	$7,600
11	17	12	Neil Bonnett	Junior Johnson & Associates	Chevrolet	160	1	running	135	$13,515
12	38	90	Ken Schrader	Donlavey Racing	Ford	160	0	running	127	$9,845
13	22	75	Jody Ridley	RahMoc Enterprises	Pontiac	160	0	running	124	$8,615
14	3	88	Buddy Baker	Baker–Schiff Racing	Oldsmobile	160	31	running	126	$6,645
15	6	22	Bobby Allison	Stavola Brothers Racing	Buick	159	3	running	123	$11,580
16	2	9	Bill Elliott	Melling Racing	Ford	159	1	running	120	$13,675
17	1	28	Cale Yarborough	Ranier-Lundy Racing	Ford	159	5	running	117	$6,975
18	39	23	Michael Waltrip (R)	Bahari Racing	Pontiac	159	0	running	109	$3,520
19	14	44	Terry Labonte	Hagan Enterprises	Oldsmobile	159	0	running	106	$10,320
20	30	71	Dave Marcis	Marcis Auto Racing	Pontiac	159	0	running	103	$8,455
21	25	4	Rick Wilson	Morgan–McClure Motorsports	Oldsmobile	158	0	running	100	$3,045
22	19	43	Richard Petty	Petty Enterprises	Pontiac	156	0	running	97	$6,595
23	41	6	Jim Sauter	U.S. Racing	Chevrolet	155	0	running	0	$6,210
24	37	52	Jimmy Means	Jimmy Means Racing	Pontiac	155	1	running	96	$5,950
25	35	67	Buddy Arrington (Note: Five laps into the race, Arrington was replaced by J. D. McDuffie. As Arrington started the race, he is credited with the finishing position.)	Arrington Racing	Ford	154	0	running	88	$5,790
26	40	29	Grant Adcox	Adcox Racing	Chevrolet	154	0	running	85	$2,195
27	5	3	Dale Earnhardt	Richard Childress Racing	Chevrolet	151	69	accident	92	$14,895
28	27	17	Pancho Carter	Hamby Racing	Chevrolet	150	0	running	79	$5,100
29	18	5	Geoff Bodine	Hendrick Motorsports	Chevrolet	147	16	engine	81	$9,995
30	42	64	Connie Saylor	Langley Racing	Ford	145	0	accident	0	$4,860
31	26	33	Harry Gant	Mach 1 Racing	Chevrolet	143	0	engine	70	$10,645
32	20	2	Rodney Combs	Harrington Racing	Chevrolet	130	0	brakes	67	$2,020
33	34	0	Doug Heveron	H. L. Waters Racing	Chevrolet	106	1	clutch	69	$2,045
34	28	77	Ken Ragan	Ragan Racing	Chevrolet	92	0	transmission	61	$1,970
35	31	54	Eddie Bierschwale	Gray Racing	Chevrolet	83	0	engine	58	$1,945
36	4	55	Benny Parsons	Jackson Bros. Motorsports	Oldsmobile	78	2	engine	60	$2,120
37	7	47	Morgan Shepherd	Race Hill Farm Team	Buick	50	0	handling	52	$1,895
38	10	18	Tommy Ellis	Freedlander Motorsports	Chevrolet	33	0	engine	49	$2,625
39	36	10	Greg Sacks	DiGard Motorsports	Chevrolet	33	0	accident	46	$1,845
40	24	81	Chet Fillip (R)	Fillip Racing	Ford	14	0	accident	43	$1,870
41	16	98	Ron Bouchard	Curb Racing	Pontiac	13	0	accident	40	$1,820
42	15	14	A. J. Foyt	A. J. Foyt Racing	Oldsmobile	2	0	engine	37	$1,820
Failed to qualify
43		73	Phil Barkdoll	Barkdoll Racing	Ford					
44		48	James Hylton	Hylton Motorsports	Chevrolet					
45		20	Rick Newsom	Newsom Racing	Chevrolet					
46		99	Brad Teague	Ball Motorsports	Chevrolet					
47		41	Ronnie Thomas	Ronnie Thomas Racing	Chevrolet					
48		39	Blackie Wangerin	Wangerin Racing	Ford					
49		70	J. D. McDuffie	McDuffie Racing	Pontiac					
Official race results

== Standings after the race ==
Drivers' Championship standings

	Pos	Driver	Points
	1	Dale Earnhardt	2,344
	2	Darrell Waltrip	2,166 (-178)
2	3	Tim Richmond	2,045 (-299)
1	4	Bill Elliott	2,037 (–307)
1	5	Bobby Allison	2,033 (–311)
	6	Rusty Wallace	1,998 (–346)
	7	Ricky Rudd	1,958 (–386)
1	8	Terry Labonte	1,859 (–485)
1	9	Harry Gant	1,858 (–486)
1	10	Bobby Hillin Jr.	1,815 (–529)
Official driver's standings

- Note: Only the first 10 positions are included for the driver standings.

== Notes ==
Previous race: 1986 Miller American 400	NASCAR Winston Cup Series; 1986 season	Next race: 1986 Summer 500
