= Rodney Combs =

American racing driver (born 1950)

- Born: March 27, 1950 (age 76); Cincinnati, Ohio, U.S.
- Achievements: 1980, 1991, 1992 Hillbilly 100 Winner
- Awards: National Dirt Late Model Hall of Fame (2001)

NASCAR Cup Series career
- 55 races run over 8 years
- Best finish: 35th (1987, 1988)
- First race: 1982 Atlanta Journal 500 (Atlanta)
- Last race: 1990 Atlanta Journal 500 (Atlanta)
Wins	Top tens	Poles
0	1	0

NASCAR O'Reilly Auto Parts Series career
- 116 races run over 9 years
- Best finish: 11th (1995)
- First race: 1982 Miller Time 300 (Charlotte)
- Last race: 1997 BellSouth Mobility/Opryland 320 (Nashville)
Wins	Top tens	Poles
0	14	0

NASCAR FedEx Freight Truck Series career
- 8 races run over 2 years
- Best finish: 34th (1995)
- First race: 1995 Sears Auto Center 125 (Milwaukee)
- Last race: 1996 Lowe's 250 (North Wilkesboro)
Wins	Top tens	Poles
0	2	0
- Statistics up to date as of April 20, 2013.

Rodney Combs (born March 27, 1950) is an American former stock car racing driver. He has not been in NASCAR since 1997, when he was released from his ride in the Busch Series. Combs entered NASCAR after many years on the open-wheel and short track circuit in the Midwest, racing with Mark Martin and Dick Trickle. Combs was a 2001 inductee in the National Dirt Late Model Hall of Fame.

== Racing career ==
=== Winston Cup Series ===
Combs made his debut in 1982, in the then Winston Cup Series. Driving the No. 5 for J.D. Stacy, Combs qualified the Stacy-Pak Buick to 28th on the starting position in the fall race at Atlanta, and finished in ninth place, leading five laps.

Combs was invited back by Stacy to drive the No. 12 Stroh's Buick in the 1983 fall race at Charlotte. Combs started 33rd and appeared to earn another top-ten, but extremely late in the going, Combs' car blew an engine, putting him to 22nd.

The next time Combs showed up was in 1984. This time, Combs was behind the No. 2 Red Roof Inns Buick owned by Robert Harrington. Combs made it into the August Michigan race with a 19th place qualifying effort. He completed all but eight laps en route to a 25th place finish.

Combs, who was still doing Midwest racing, disappeared back to those ranks for a year, and then returned with a five-race deal in 1986. Driving Harrington's No. 2 Solder Seal/Gunk Pontiac, Combs had a best of sixteenth at Charlotte and a nineteenth at Talladega, where he led four laps. However, Combs only finished the Charlotte race, falling out of the other four.

Combs drove for a number of teams in 1987, yet still could not crack the top ten. His best run was a 16th at Pocono, although he did have five other top-20s. He ran the majority of the races for Elmo Langley's #64 team, although he did have some runs with DiGard Motorsports and Roger Hamby. Overall, he had 14 starts in 1987, and earned a 35th-place position in points.

Combs ran nineteen races in 1988, the most active year of his career. Seventeen of them were for the No. 97 ACDelco team, while Combs competed in one race for Ken Allen and another for Richard Childress Racing. Despite all the starts, Combs had a worse year than in 1987, despite matching the 35th in points. His best finish was 11th at Bristol, but he only had one other top-twenty, a 14th at Michigan. Combs, however, did earn his first career top-10 starting spot, a 9th at Richmond. Combs' biggest issue was eleven DNFs, though to Combs' defense, all but one of them was mechanical. Combs competed in the 1988 NASCAR Christmas 500 at Australia's Calder Park Thunderdome, where he finished sixth.

In 1989, Combs only made nine starts and did not even crack the top-20. His best run was a 23rd at Darlington, driving for Lake Speed. Yet, Combs ran the majority of the races for the No. 89 Evinrude Pontiac. The best run for that team was a 27th at Phoenix. Combs also had three races in 1989 for Allen.

Combs made his last five career Cup starts in 1990. Combs ran all five races for the No. 89 team, but could only manage a best of 27th at Phoenix. In addition, Combs only finished two of the races. Overall in his Cup career, Combs had one top-ten finish and one top-ten start.

Combs competed in the 1990 NASCAR Christmas 400 at Calder Park, where he finished fourteenth.

=== Busch Series ===
Combs made his Busch debut in 1982, the same year he made his Cup debut. Driving for J.D. Stacy again, Combs drove the No. 4 Stacy Pontiac into the Charlotte field with a seventh place starting position. Like he would in his Cup debut, Combs came home with a 9th place showing.

Combs made another one-off start in 1983. Once again, Combs ran at Charlotte, where he qualified a fourth. This time, Combs could not improve on his first finish, but still came home with a tenth place showing.

Combs disappeared for three years, and was back in 1987, with a four-race deal with the #67 J&J Steel car. His best run once again came at Charlotte, adding another tenth place on. Also noteworthy was a start and finish of thirteenth at Darlington.

Combs next race came in 1990, driving for Ferree Racing at Charlotte. He started 26th, but finished 37th after his carburetor failed.

Combs finally made his first full season in NASCAR in 1993, driving the No. 1 Luxaire Ford for the full season, qualifying for all but one race. Combs earned three top-tens in 1993, with a career-best eighth at Milwaukee Mile and back-to-back tenths at Martinsville and Nazareth. Even more to Combs advantage, were a low DNF count of three, an impressive number for someone who is basically a rookie. Most impressive of all, by far, is his lowest finish. His lowest finish of the year was at Darlington, where he finished 26th. This contributed to Combs earning a fifteenth in points, despite missing one race. Lastly, Combs qualified well too, the best being a triplet of fourth-place starts, of which he converted into a tenth, twelfth and fifteenth-place finish in the race.

With an impressive season with a low-budget team, Combs was hired by Petty Enterprises to drive the No. 43 Black Flag/French's Pontiac the following year. Despite the famous ride, 1994 was a roller coaster. Combs did not make four of the 27 races, but matched his three top-tens of '93. Combs best runs were a pair of 9th at Martinsville and Myrtle Beach and a tenth at Bristol. Yet, Combs did have seven other top-twenties. However, in addition to poor qualifying results with the first year team, Combs' team had nine DNFs, a tough thing to overcome. (In Combs' defense, all but two were mechanical) This led to a poor 21st place showing in points.

Combs' best career year in any NASCAR series came in 1995, where he finished eleventh in points. This year, Combs made all the races, and this enabled him to once again earn three top-tens. Combs earned new career bests of sixth at Myrtle Beach and Atlanta, and tacked on a tenth at Dover International Speedway and a large sixteen other top-twenties to boot. Along with a lesser DNF count (four), Combs' team looked in good shape for 1996.

However, 1996 was not Combs' best year, and it began to lead to his departure from the sport. Combs made all but one start in 1996, and earned eighteenth in points, after another up-and-down year. Combs earned a pair of sixths as his only top-tens in 1996 at Daytona and Atlanta. (Combs would later prove to have a career best finish of sixth-four times) Combs did earn what would prove to be his best career start: a third at Myrtle Beach. However, on the flipside, Combs only earned nine top-twenties, down from nineteen in 1995, the primary reason for his points slide.

1997 was the end of Combs' career. Petty Enterprises sold the team to David Ridling. He only made five starts for the team before being released, the best being an eleventh place finish at Atlanta. He was replaced by Dennis Setzer and replaced Setzer in the No. 78 Mark III Financial Chevy. He ran a best of 20th at Richmond in three races for the team. Yet, after Nashville, Combs disappeared from the team and has not been racing in big-league NASCAR since.

=== Craftsman Truck Series ===
When racing for Petty Enterprises in 1995 and 1996, Combs made five starts in 1995 and one in 1996 for in the Truck Series. Combs made his series debut at Milwaukee, qualifying ninth and finishing tenth. Combs then came back at IRP, qualifying ninth and once again coming home with a top-ten: this time a solid fourth. Combs made three more starts in 1995, with finishes of eleventh, fourteenth and sixteenth. Combs also added on one more start in 1996. Driving at North Wilkesboro, Combs managed a career-best fourth place start. However, he came home with a career-worst finish of twentieth.

Combs has not raced in NASCAR since.

== Motorsports career results ==
=== NASCAR ===
(key) (Bold – Pole position awarded by qualifying time. Italics – Pole position earned by points standings or practice time. * – Most laps led.)

==== Winston Cup Series ====
NASCAR Winston Cup Series results
Year	Team	No.	Make	1	2	3	4	5	6	7	8	9	10	11	12	13	14	15	16	17	18	19	20	21	22	23	24	25	26	27	28	29	30	NWCC	Pts	Ref
1982	Jim Stacy Racing	5	Buick	DAY	RCH	BRI	ATL	CAR	DAR	NWS	MAR	TAL	NSV	DOV	CLT	POC	RSD	MCH	DAY	NSV	POC	TAL	MCH	BRI	DAR	RCH	DOV	NWS	CLT	MAR	CAR	ATL; 9	RSD	71st	143	
1983	Jim Stacy Racing	12	Buick	DAY	RCH	CAR	ATL	DAR	NWS	MAR	TAL	NSV	DOV	BRI	CLT	RSD	POC	MCH	DAY	NSV	POC	TAL	MCH	BRI	DAR	RCH	DOV	MAR	NWS	CLT; 22	CAR	ATL	RSD	87th	97	
1984	Harrington Racing	2	Buick	DAY	RCH	CAR	ATL	BRI	NWS	DAR	MAR	TAL	NSV	DOV	CLT	RSD	POC	MCH	DAY	NSV	POC	TAL	MCH; 25	BRI	DAR	RCH	DOV	MAR	CLT	NWS	CAR	ATL	RSD	NA	0	
1986	Harrington Racing	2	Chevy	DAY	RCH	CAR	ATL	BRI	DAR	NWS	MAR	TAL	DOV	CLT	RSD	POC	MCH	DAY; 32	POC	TAL; 19	GLN										ATL; 37	RSD		44th	421	
1986	Harrington Racing	2	Pontiac																			MCH; 29	BRI	DAR	RCH	DOV	MAR	NWS	CLT; 16	CAR				44th	421	
1987	DiGard Motorsports	10	Olds	DAY; 19	CAR	RCH	ATL																											35th	1098	
1987	DiGard Motorsports	10	Chevy					DAR; 37	NWS; 20	BRI	MAR	TAL	CLT																					35th	1098	
1987	Langley Racing	64	Ford											DOV; 20	POC; 20	RSD	MCH; 23	DAY; 31	POC; 16	TAL; 19	GLN; 23	MCH; 31	BRI; 23	DAR; 27	RCH	DOV	MAR	NWS						35th	1098	
1987	Hamby Motorsports	12	Chevy																										CLT; 37	CAR	RSD	ATL		35th	1098	
1988	Inglass Racing	0	Olds	DAY; Wth	RCH	CAR																												35th	1468	
1988	Winkle Motorsports	97	Buick				ATL; 27	DAR; 32	BRI; DNQ	NWS; 23	MAR; DNQ	TAL; 38	CLT; 32	DOV; 29	RSD	POC; 34	MCH; 30	DAY; 33	POC; 36	TAL; 29	GLN; 24	MCH; 14	BRI; 11	DAR; 21	RCH; 21	DOV; 40	MAR; DNQ							35th	1468	
1988	Richard Childress Racing	22	Chevy																									CLT; DNQ	NWS	CAR; 40	PHO			35th	1468	
1988	AAG Racing	34	Buick																													ATL; 29		35th	1468	
1989	Mueller Brothers Racing	89	Pontiac	DAY; 37									CLT; DNQ	DOV	SON	POC	MCH; 40	DAY	POC	TAL; DNQ	GLN	MCH; DNQ	BRI					CLT; 32	NWS	CAR	PHO; 27	ATL; 41		42nd	470	
1989	AAG Racing	34	Buick		CAR; 40	ATL	RCH; 32	DAR; 29	BRI	NWS	MAR	TAL; DNQ																						42nd	470	
1989	Speed Racing	83	Olds																					DAR; 23	RCH	DOV	MAR							42nd	470	
1990	Mueller Brothers Racing	89	Pontiac	DAY; DNQ	RCH	CAR	ATL	DAR	BRI	NWS	MAR	TAL	CLT; 33	DOV	SON	POC	MCH; 40	DAY	POC	TAL	GLN	MCH; 34	BRI	DAR	RCH	DOV	MAR	NWS	CLT; DNQ	CAR	PHO; 27	ATL; 30		46th	323	

===== Daytona 500 =====
Year	Team	Manufacturer	Start	Finish
1987	DiGard Motorsports	Oldsmobile	36	19
1988	Inglass Racing	Oldsmobile	Wth	
1989	Mueller Brothers Racing	Pontiac	30	37
1990	Mueller Brothers Racing	Pontiac	DNQ	

==== Busch Series ====
NASCAR Busch Series results
Year	Team	No.	Make	1	2	3	4	5	6	7	8	9	10	11	12	13	14	15	16	17	18	19	20	21	22	23	24	25	26	27	28	29	30	31	32	33	34	35	NBSC	Pts	Ref
1982	Jim Stacy Racing	4	Pontiac	DAY	RCH	BRI	MAR	DAR	HCY	SBO	CRW	RCH	LGY	DOV	HCY	CLT	ASH	HCY	SBO	CAR	CRW	SBO	HCY	LGY	IRP	BRI	HCY	RCH	MAR	CLT; 9	HCY	MAR							112th	138	
1983		89	Pontiac	DAY	RCH	CAR	HCY	MAR	NWS	SBO	GPS	LGY	DOV	BRI	CLT	SBO	HCY	ROU	SBO	ROU	CRW	ROU	SBO	HCY	LGY	IRP	GPS	BRI	HCY	DAR	RCH	NWS	SBO	MAR	ROU	CLT; 10	HCY	MAR	107th	134	
1987		67	Pontiac	DAY; 10	HCY	MAR	DAR; 13	BRI	LGY	SBO	CLT; 32	DOV; 28	IRP	ROU	JFC	OXF	SBO	HCY	RAL	LGY	ROU	BRI	JFC	DAR	RCH	DOV	MAR	CLT	CAR	MAR									41st	404	
1988		67	Pontiac	DAY; DNQ	HCY	CAR	MAR	DAR	BRI	LNG	NZH	SBO	NSV	CLT	DOV	ROU	LAN	LVL	MYB	OXF	SBO	HCY	LNG	IRP	ROU	BRI	DAR	RCH	DOV	MAR	CLT	CAR	MAR						NA	-	
1990	Ferree Racing	49	Pontiac	DAY	RCH	CAR	MAR	HCY	DAR	BRI	LAN	SBO	NZH	HCY	CLT; 37	DOV	ROU	VOL	MYB	OXF	NHA	SBO	DUB	IRP	ROU	BRI	DAR	RCH	DOV	MAR	CLT	NHA	CAR	MAR					117th	0	
1993	Rexrode Galiano Motorsports	1	Ford	DAY; 14	CAR; 23	RCH; 19	DAR; 18	BRI; 23	HCY; 21	ROU; 12	MAR; 10	NZH; 10	CLT; 19	DOV; 18	MYB; 22	GLN; 16	MLW; 8	TAL; 14	IRP; 25	MCH; 14	NHA; 11	BRI; 20	DAR; 26	RCH; DNQ	DOV; 25	ROU; 19	CLT; 19	MAR; 19	CAR; 15	HCY; 25	ATL; 14								15th	2969	
1994	Petty Enterprises	43	Pontiac	DAY; 11	CAR; 27	RCH; 38	ATL; 18	MAR; 9	DAR; 28	HCY; DNQ	BRI; 10	ROU; 28	NHA; 29	NZH; 38	CLT; 27	DOV; 14	MYB; 9	GLN; 11	MLW; 14	SBO; 13	TAL; 28	HCY; DNQ	IRP; 17	MCH; 39	BRI	DAR; 42	RCH; 35	DOV; 24	CLT; 32	MAR	CAR								21st	2131	
1995	Petty Enterprises	43	Pontiac	DAY; 16	CAR; 11	RCH; 20	ATL; 6	NSV; 16	DAR; 17	BRI; 19	HCY; 19	NHA; 12	NZH; 21	CLT; 41	DOV; 11	MYB; 6	GLN; 14	MLW; 23	TAL; 39	SBO; 13	IRP; 33	MCH; 17	BRI; 15	DAR; 20	RCH; 36	DOV; 10	CLT; 15	CAR; 17	HOM; 22										11th	2782	
1996	Petty Enterprises	43	Chevy	DAY; 6			ATL; 6		DAR; 34		HCY; 21	NZH; 17	CLT; 26			MYB; 22	GLN; 21	MLW; 28	NHA; 27	TAL; 35	IRP; 28	MCH; 20	BRI; 22	DAR; 17	RCH; 17	DOV; 12	CLT; DNQ	CAR; 34	HOM; 38										18th	2396	
1996	Petty Enterprises	43	Pontiac		CAR; DNQ	RCH; 11		NSV; 19		BRI; 28				DOV; 11	SBO; 24																								18th	2396	
1996	Ken Wilson	02	Chevy		CAR; 39																																		18th	2396	
1997	Ridling Motorsports	43	Chevy	DAY; 11	CAR; 15	RCH; 31	ATL; 33	LVS; 17																															45th	743	
1997	Mark III Racing	78	Chevy						DAR; 32	HCY; DNQ	TEX	BRI; 20	NSV; 28	TAL; DNQ	NHA	NZH	CLT	DOV	SBO	GLN	MLW	MYB	GTY	IRP	MCH	BRI	DAR	RCH	DOV	CLT	CAL	CAR	HOM						45th	743	

==== Craftsman Truck Series ====
NASCAR Craftsman Truck Series results
Year	Team	No.	Make	1	2	3	4	5	6	7	8	9	10	11	12	13	14	15	16	17	18	19	20	21	22	23	24	NCTC	Pts	Ref
1995	Petty Enterprises	43	Chevy	PHO	TUS	SGS	MMR	POR	EVG	I70	LVL	BRI	MLW; 10	CNS	HPT	IRP; 4	FLM	RCH; 16	MAR; 14	NWS; 11	SON	MMR	PHO					34th	660	
1996	Combs Racing	49	Chevy	HOM	PHO	POR	EVG	TUS	CNS	HPT	BRI	NZH	MLW	LVL	I70	IRP	FLM	GLN	NSV	RCH	NHA	MAR	NWS; 20	SON	MMR	PHO	LVS	104th	103	

=== ARCA Permatex SuperCar Series ===
(key) (Bold – Pole position awarded by qualifying time. Italics – Pole position earned by points standings or practice time. * – Most laps led.)

ARCA Permatex SuperCar Series results
Year	Team	No.	Make	1	2	3	4	5	6	7	8	9	10	11	12	13	14	15	16	17	18	19	APSC	Pts	Ref
1988		4	Olds	DAY; 18	ATL	TAL	FRS	PCS	ROC	POC	WIN	KIL	ACS	SLM	POC	TAL	DEL	FRS	ISF	DSF	SLM	ATL	96th	-	
