= Chet Fillip =

American racing driver

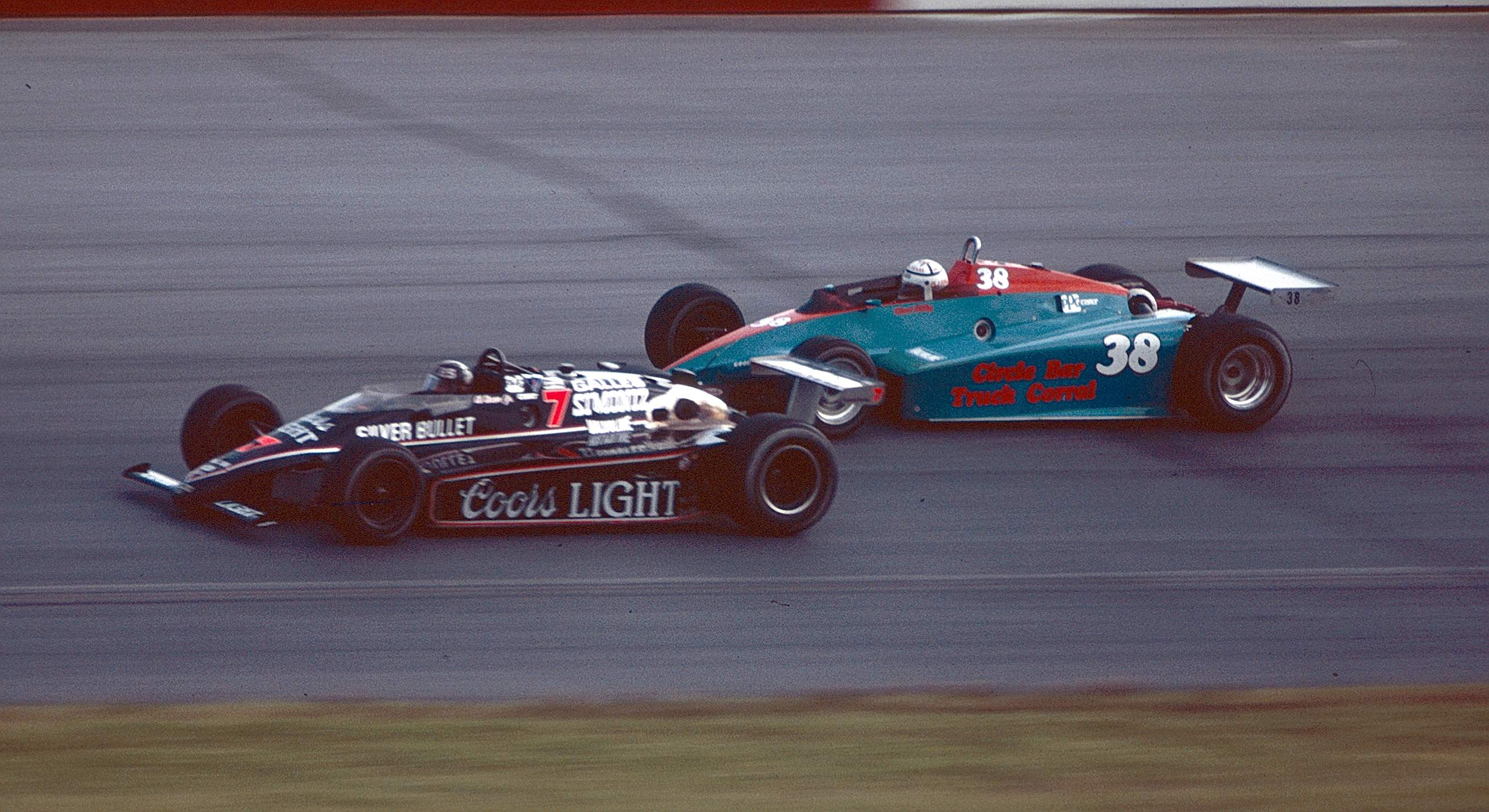
Fillip (right) racing against Al Unser Jr. in 1984

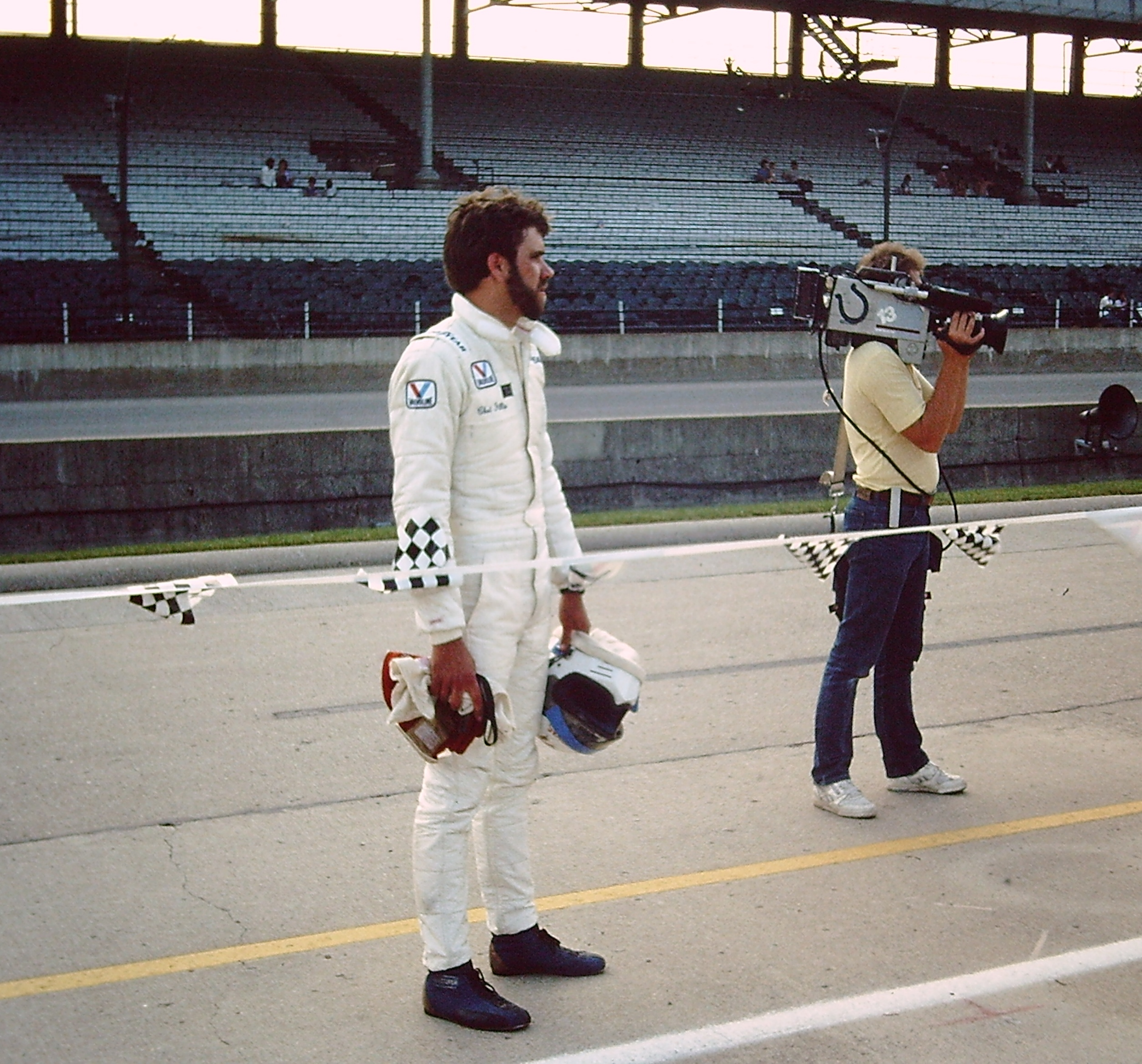
Fillip at the 1985 Indianapolis 500

Chet Fillip (born April 4, 1957), is an American former racing driver best known for driving in the CART series. Fillip raced stock cars and a modified during his teens and early twenties at Arena Park Raceway in Lubbock, Texas. His father Marvin Fillip also raced at this track. Chet raced in the CART series in the 1982–1985 seasons, with nine career starts, and started in the Indianapolis 500 in 1982 and 1983 (the Indianapolis 500 was sanctioned by USAC at the time, meaning that it is not counted among his CART starts). His best CART finish was in tenth position in 1985 at Milwaukee. At the end of the 1985 season, he switched to the NASCAR Winston Cup Series, where he continued racing through 1987, making 24 starts with a best finish of twelfth. After NASCAR, Fillip raced several years in USAC sprint cars, with eight victories including the prestigious Little 500 in 1999.

2006 saw the formation of a new racing series, the Premier Racing Association (PRA). The PRA used former pavement racing cars of the USAC Silver Crown Series which had switched to a different type of car more suitable for faster, larger tracks a mile or more in length. Fillip won the first championship of this series driving a car of his own design and manufacture. Though he won no races he finished no lower than sixth in any event while always running near the front. After at least 28 years driving everything from sports cars to Indy cars to stock cars, he won his first series championship.

With the reinstatement of the "classic" Silver Crown cars to all races on the schedule, Fillip now participates full-time in that series and won the race prior to the IndyCar Series event at Richmond International Raceway on June 28, 2008, at the age of 51.

Fillip lives in Avon, Indiana.

== Motorsports career results ==
=== American open-wheel racing ===
(key) (Races in bold indicate pole position)

==== CART PPG Indy Car World Series ====
CART PPG Indy Car World Series results
Year	Team	Chassis	Engine	1	2	3	4	5	6	7	8	9	10	11	12	13	14	15	16	Pos.	Pts	Ref
1982	Circle Bar Racing	Wildcat MK8	Cosworth DFX V8t	PHX	ATL	MIL	CLE	MCH	MIL	POC	RIV	ROA	MCH	PHX; 15						44th	1	
1983	Circle Bar Racing	Wildcat MK8	Cosworth DFX V8t	ATL; 19									MCH; 18	CPL	LAG	PHX				NC	0	
1983	Circle Bar Racing	Eagle CB1	Cosworth DFX V8t		INDY; 33	MIL	CLE	MCH	ROA	POC	RIV	MDO								NC	0	
1984	Circle Bar Racing	VDS Penske PC-10	Cosworth DFX V8t	LBH	PHX	INDY; DNQ	MIL	POR	MEA	CLE	MCH; 31	ROA	POC; 15	MDO; DNQ	SAN	MCH; 17	PHX	LAG	CPL	NC	0	
1985	Circle Bar Racing	Lola T900	Cosworth DFX V8t	LBH	INDY; DNQ	MIL; 10	POR	MEA	CLE; 18	MCH; 17	ROA	POC	MDO	SAN	MCH	LAG	PHX	MIA		37th	3	

===== Indianapolis 500 =====
Year	Chassis	Engine	Start	Finish	Team
1982	Wildcat	Cosworth	29	24	Circle Bar Racing
1983	Wildcat	Cosworth	32	33	Circle Bar Racing
1984	VDS Penske	Cosworth	DNQ		Circle Bar Racing
1985	Lola	Cosworth	DNQ		Circle Bar Racing

=== NASCAR ===
(key) (Bold – Pole position awarded by qualifying time. Italics – Pole position earned by points standings or practice time. * – Most laps led.)

==== Winston Cup Series ====
NASCAR Winston Cup Series results
Year	Team	No.	Make	1	2	3	4	5	6	7	8	9	10	11	12	13	14	15	16	17	18	19	20	21	22	23	24	25	26	27	28	29	NWCC	Pts	Ref
1985	Circle Bar Racing	31	Ford	DAY	RCH	CAR	ATL	BRI	DAR	NWS	MAR	TAL	DOV	CLT	RSD	POC	MCH	DAY	POC	TAL	MCH	BRI	DAR	RCH	DOV	MAR	NWS	CLT	CAR	ATL; 25	RSD		81st	88	
1986	Circle Bar Racing	81	Ford	DAY; DNQ	RCH	CAR	ATL; 36	BRI; 22	DAR	NWS; 23	MAR	TAL; 23	DOV	CLT; 37	RSD	POC; 20	MCH; 26	DAY; 40	POC; 12	TAL; 28	GLN; 22	MCH; 15	BRI; 25	DAR; 35	RCH	DOV; 23	MAR	NWS; 21	CLT; 38	CAR	ATL	RSD	32nd	1433	
1987	Fillip Racing	81	Ford	DAY; 39	CAR; 24	RCH	ATL	DAR	NWS	BRI	MAR	TAL; 41	CLT; DNQ	DOV	POC			DAY; 21	POC														44th	480	
1987	Arrington Racing	67	Ford													RSD; 21	MCH			TAL; 20	GLN	MCH	BRI	DAR	RCH	DOV	MAR	NWS	CLT	CAR	RSD	ATL	44th	480	

===== Daytona 500 =====
Year	Team	Manufacturer	Start	Finish
1986	Circle Bar Racing	Ford	DNQ	
1987	Fillip Racing	Ford	26	39
