= Connie Saylor =

American racing driver

- Born: June 3, 1940; Johnson City, Tennessee, U.S.
- Died: February 4, 1993 (aged 52); Bluff City, Tennessee, U.S.
- Cause of death: Cancer

NASCAR Cup Series career
- 58 races run over 11 years
- Best finish: 39th – 1981 NASCAR Winston Cup Series season
- First race: 1978 Atlanta 500 (Atlanta International Raceway)
- Last race: 1988 AC Delco 500 (North Carolina Motor Speedway)
Wins	Top tens	Poles
0	1	0

Conrad Saylor (June 3, 1940 – February 4, 1993) was an American journeyman NASCAR race car driver.

== Career ==
Saylor did one-off events in the Winston Cup Series during the 1980s and early 1990s, and also raced in ARCA and late model sportsman His most well-known moment came in the 1981 Twin 125s, qualifying races for the Daytona 500, in which he spun off turn two and flipped, sliding down the backstretch on his roof for about 1,000 feet (300 m). He was uninjured in the crash, and did not qualify for the race. He won a consolation race at Daytona in 1984.

In Winston Cup racing, Saylor picked up his best finish in his debut race, in 1978, eighth Race Graph.

== Personal life ==
Saylor was married to Shirley Nowlin and had two children, Tracy and Tim Saylor. He started a mining and industrial tire and wheel business in Johnson city, Tennessee, in 1977, which is still in operation by his family.

Saylor was from Johnson City, Tennessee. Saylor died at his home in Bluff City on February 4, 1993 after a battle with cancer.

== Motorsports career results ==
=== NASCAR ===
(key) (Bold – Pole position awarded by qualifying time. Italics – Pole position earned by points standings or practice time. * – Most laps led.)

==== Winston Cup Series ====
NASCAR Winston Cup Series results
Year	Team	No.	Make	1	2	3	4	5	6	7	8	9	10	11	12	13	14	15	16	17	18	19	20	21	22	23	24	25	26	27	28	29	30	31	NWCC	Pts	Ref
1978	GC Spencer Racing	49	Dodge	RSD	DAY	RCH	CAR	ATL; 8	BRI	DAR	NWS	MAR	TAL	DOV	CLT; 34	NSV	RSD	MCH	DAY	NSV	POC	TAL	MCH	BRI	DAR	RCH	DOV	MAR	NWS	CLT; 16	CAR	ATL	ONT		54th	318	
1979	GC Spencer Racing	49	Dodge	RSD	DAY; DNQ	CAR	RCH	ATL	NWS	BRI	DAR	MAR																							77th	170	
1979	GC Spencer Racing	6	Dodge										TAL; 18	NSV	DOV	CLT; 34	TWS	RSD	MCH	DAY	NSV	POC	TAL	MCH	BRI	DAR	RCH	DOV	MAR	CLT	NWS	CAR	ATL	ONT	77th	170	
1980	GC Spencer Racing	4	Chevy	RSD	DAY	RCH	CAR	ATL	BRI	DAR	NWS	MAR	TAL	NSV	DOV	CLT; 19	TWS	RSD	MCH	DAY; 39	NSV	POC	TAL	MCH	BRI	DAR; 14	RCH	DOV	NWS	MAR	CLT; 23	CAR	ATL; 27	ONT	67th	227	
1981	GC Spencer Racing	4	Olds	RSD	DAY; DNQ	RCH	CAR	ATL	BRI	NWS	DAR	MAR	TAL; 37	NSV	DOV	CLT; 12	TWS	RSD	MCH	DAY; 14	NSV	POC	TAL; 33	MCH	BRI	DAR; 40	RCH	DOV	MAR	NWS	CLT; 11	CAR	ATL; 12	RSD	39th	664	
1982	GC Spencer Racing	4	Olds	DAY; DNQ	RCH	BRI	ATL; 31	CAR	DAR	NWS	MAR	TAL	NSV	DOV	CLT; 15	POC	RSD	MCH	DAY; 39	NSV	POC	TAL; 37	MCH		DAR; 12	RCH	DOV	NWS	CLT; 39	MAR	CAR	ATL	RSD		49th	335	
1982	GC Spencer Racing	4	Buick																					BRI; 20											49th	335	
1983	GC Spencer Racing	4	Olds	DAY; DNQ	RCH	CAR	ATL	DAR	NWS	MAR																									101st	43	
1983	Morgan-McClure Motorsports	4	Olds								TAL; 40	NSV	DOV	BRI	CLT	RSD	POC	MCH																	101st	43	
1983	Ulrich Racing	6	Chevy																DAY; 18	NSV	POC	TAL	MCH	BRI	DAR	RCH	DOV	MAR	NWS	CLT	CAR	ATL	RSD		101st	43	
1984	Adcox Racing	29	Chevy	DAY; 22																															43rd	367	
1984	Lain Racing	37	Pontiac	DAY; DNQ	RCH	CAR; 33	ATL	BRI	NWS	DAR; 25	MAR	TAL	NSV	DOV	CLT; 39	RSD	POC				POC; 29	TAL	MCH	BRI											43rd	367	
1984	Lain Racing	37	Buick															MCH; DNQ																	43rd	367	
1984	U.S. Racing	6	Chevy																DAY; 27	NSV															43rd	367	
1984	Bahre Racing	23	Chevy																						DAR; 31	RCH	DOV	MAR	CLT; 34	NWS	CAR	ATL	RSD		43rd	367	
1985	Ball Motorsports	99	Chevy	DAY; DNQ	RCH	CAR	ATL	BRI	DAR; 35	NWS	MAR	TAL; 22	DOV	CLT; DNQ	RSD	POC	MCH	DAY; 40	POC	TAL; 41	MCH	BRI	DAR; DNQ	RCH	DOV	MAR	NWS	CLT	CAR	ATL; 35	RSD				49th	296	
1986	Ball Motorsports	99	Chevy	DAY; DNQ	RCH	CAR	ATL	BRI				TAL; 33	DOV																						59th	334	
1986	Langley Racing	64	Ford						DAR; 18	NWS	MAR							DAY; 30	POC	TAL; DNQ	GLN	MCH	BRI; DNQ	DAR; 26	RCH	DOV	MAR	NWS	CLT; 17	CAR	ATL; 30	RSD			59th	334	
1986	Spohn Racing	51	Ford											CLT; 28	RSD	POC	MCH																		59th	334	
1987	Langley Racing	64	Ford	DAY; 40	CAR	RCH	ATL; 41	DAR; 24	NWS	BRI	MAR	TAL; 23																							42nd	486	
1987	U.S. Racing	6	Chevy										CLT; 33	DOV	POC	RSD	MCH; 38	DAY; DNQ	POC; 18	TAL; DNQ	GLN	MCH; DNQ	BRI						CLT; 16	CAR; 25	RSD	ATL			42nd	486	
1987	U.S. Racing	6	Olds																					DAR; 34	RCH	DOV	MAR	NWS							42nd	486	
1988	Ball Motorsports	99	Chevy	DAY; 39	RCH	CAR	ATL	DAR	BRI	NWS	MAR	TAL; DNQ	CLT	DOV	RSD	POC	MCH	DAY	POC	TAL	GLN	MCH	BRI	DAR	RCH	DOV	MAR								68th	100	
1988	AAG Racing	34	Buick																									CLT; DNQ	NWS	CAR; 21	PHO	ATL			68th	100	
1989	Branch-Ragan Racing	77	Ford	DAY; DNQ	CAR	ATL	RCH	DAR	BRI	NWS	MAR	TAL	CLT	DOV	SON	POC	MCH	DAY	POC	TAL	GLN	MCH	BRI	DAR	RCH	DOV	MAR	CLT	NWS	CAR	PHO	ATL			NA	-	

===== Daytona 500 =====
Year	Team	Manufacturer	Start	Finish
1979	GC Spencer Racing	Dodge	DNQ	
1981	GC Spencer Racing	Oldsmobile	DNQ	
1982	GC Spencer Racing	Oldsmobile	DNQ	
1983	GC Spencer Racing	Oldsmobile	DNQ	
1984	Lain Racing	Pontiac	DNQ	
1984	Adcox Racing	Chevrolet	36	22
1985	Ball Motorsports	Chevrolet	DNQ	
1986	Ball Motorsports	Chevrolet	DNQ	
1987	Langley Racing	Ford	25	40
1988	Ball Motorsports	Chevrolet	30	39
1989	Branch-Ragan Racing	Ford	DNQ	

==== Busch Series ====
NASCAR Busch Series results
Year	Team	No.	Make	1	2	3	4	5	6	7	8	9	10	11	12	13	14	15	16	17	18	19	20	21	22	23	24	25	26	27	28	29	30	31	32	33	34	35	NBSC	Pts	Ref
1982		4	Pontiac	DAY; 29	RCH	BRI	MAR	DAR	HCY	SBO	CRW	RCH	LGY	DOV	HCY	CLT; 11	ASH	HCY	SBO	CAR	CRW	SBO	HCY	LGY	IRP	BRI	HCY	RCH	MAR	CLT	HCY	MAR							97th	206	
1983	Saylor Racing	93	Pontiac	DAY	RCH	CAR	HCY	MAR	NWS	SBO	GPS	LGY	DOV	BRI	CLT	SBO	HCY	ROU	SBO	ROU	CRW	ROU	SBO	HCY	LGY	IRP	GPS	BRI	HCY	DAR; 29	RCH	NWS	SBO	MAR	ROU	CLT	HCY	MAR	140th	76	
1984	Saylor Racing	93	Pontiac	DAY; 32	RCH	CAR	HCY	MAR	DAR	ROU	NSV	LGY	MLW	DOV	CLT	SBO	HCY	ROU	SBO	ROU	HCY	IRP	LGY	SBO	BRI	DAR	RCH	NWS	CLT	HCY	CAR	MAR							96th	67	

=== ARCA Permatex SuperCar Series ===
(key) (Bold – Pole position awarded by qualifying time. Italics – Pole position earned by points standings or practice time. * – Most laps led.)

ARCA Permatex SuperCar Series results
Year	Team	No.	Make	1	2	3	4	5	6	7	8	9	10	11	12	13	14	15	16	APSC	Pts	Ref
1980		2	Pontiac	DAY	NWS	FRS	FRS	MCH	TAL; 21	IMS	FRS	MCH								NA	0	
1984		9	Pontiac	DAY	ATL; 36															NA	0	
1984	Lain Racing	37	Pontiac			TAL; 9	CSP	SMS	FRS	MCS	LCS	IRP	TAL; 15	FRS	ISF	DSF	TOL	MGR		NA	0	
1985	Lain Racing	37	Pontiac	ATL; 21	DAY	ATL	TAL	ATL	SSP	IRP	CSP	FRS	IRP	OEF	ISF	DSF	TOL			120th	-	
1986		37	Chevy	ATL; 17	DAY	ATL	TAL	SIR	SSP	FRS	KIL	CSP								52nd	-	
1986	Langley Racing	64	Ford										TAL; 10	BLN	ISF	DSF	TOL	MCS		52nd	-	
1986	Ball Motorsports	98	Chevy																ATL; 18	52nd	-	
