= Motorcraft =

Ford-associated brand of vehicle parts and maintenance products

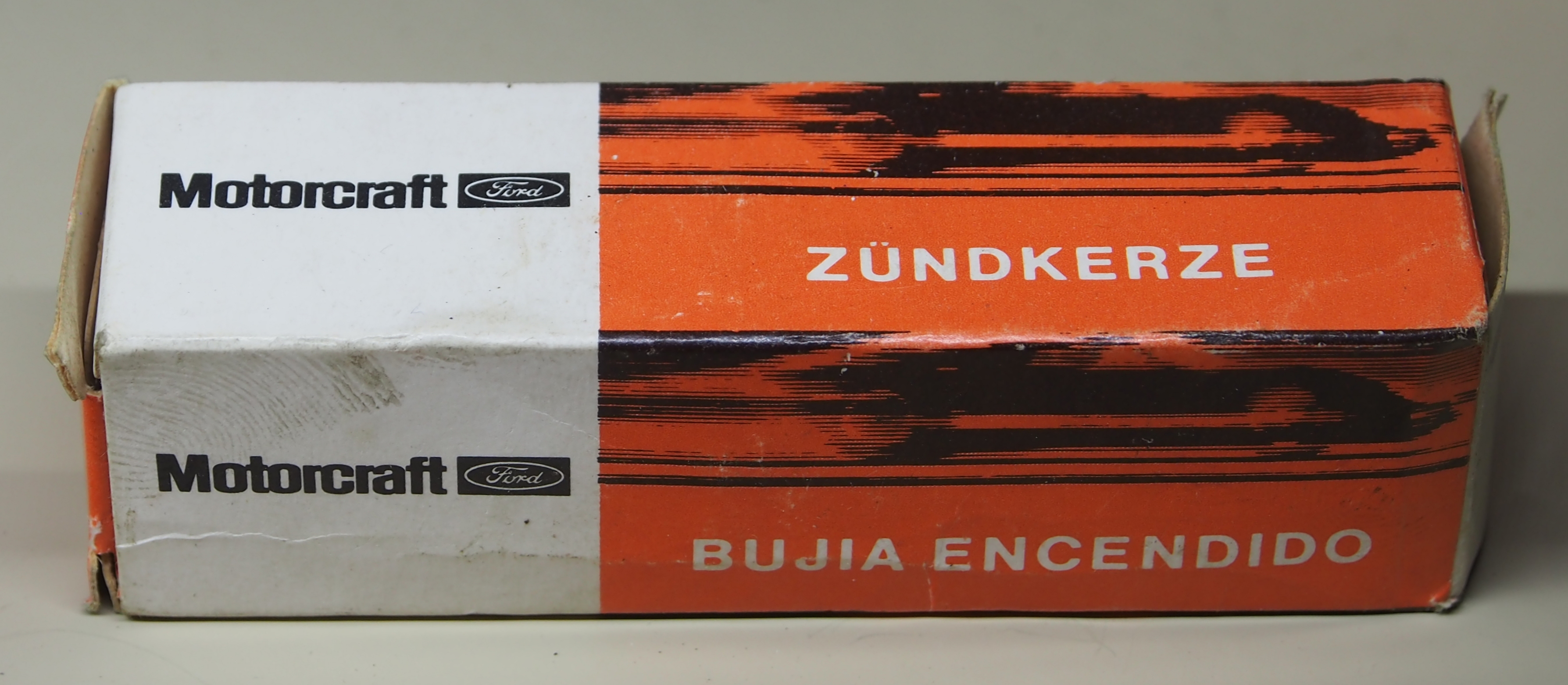
- Original Motorcraft packaging, showing the original logo (a motion blur of a Ford GT40 accelerating)
- Product type: Auto parts
- Current owner: Ford
- Produced by: Ford
- Country: U.S.
- Introduced: 1972; 54 years ago
- Related brands: MERCON; ACDelco; Mopar
- Markets: Global
- Website: motorcraft.com

Motorcraft is an auto part brand owned and operated by Ford Motor Company. Products under the "Motorcraft" brand include spark plugs, batteries, brakes, fuel filters, A/C condensers and accumulators, motor oil, automatic transmission fluid, among other goods.

== History ==
Ford launched this auto parts division in 1972 to provide replacement parts and original equipment parts. This brand replaced Autolite as Ford's official parts brand. Autolite has continued since and is still a brand name in use today. Motorcraft was originally launched in the 1950s and was temporarily discontinued after Ford had purchased the Autolite trade name and utilized it as their primary auto parts brand.

== Today ==
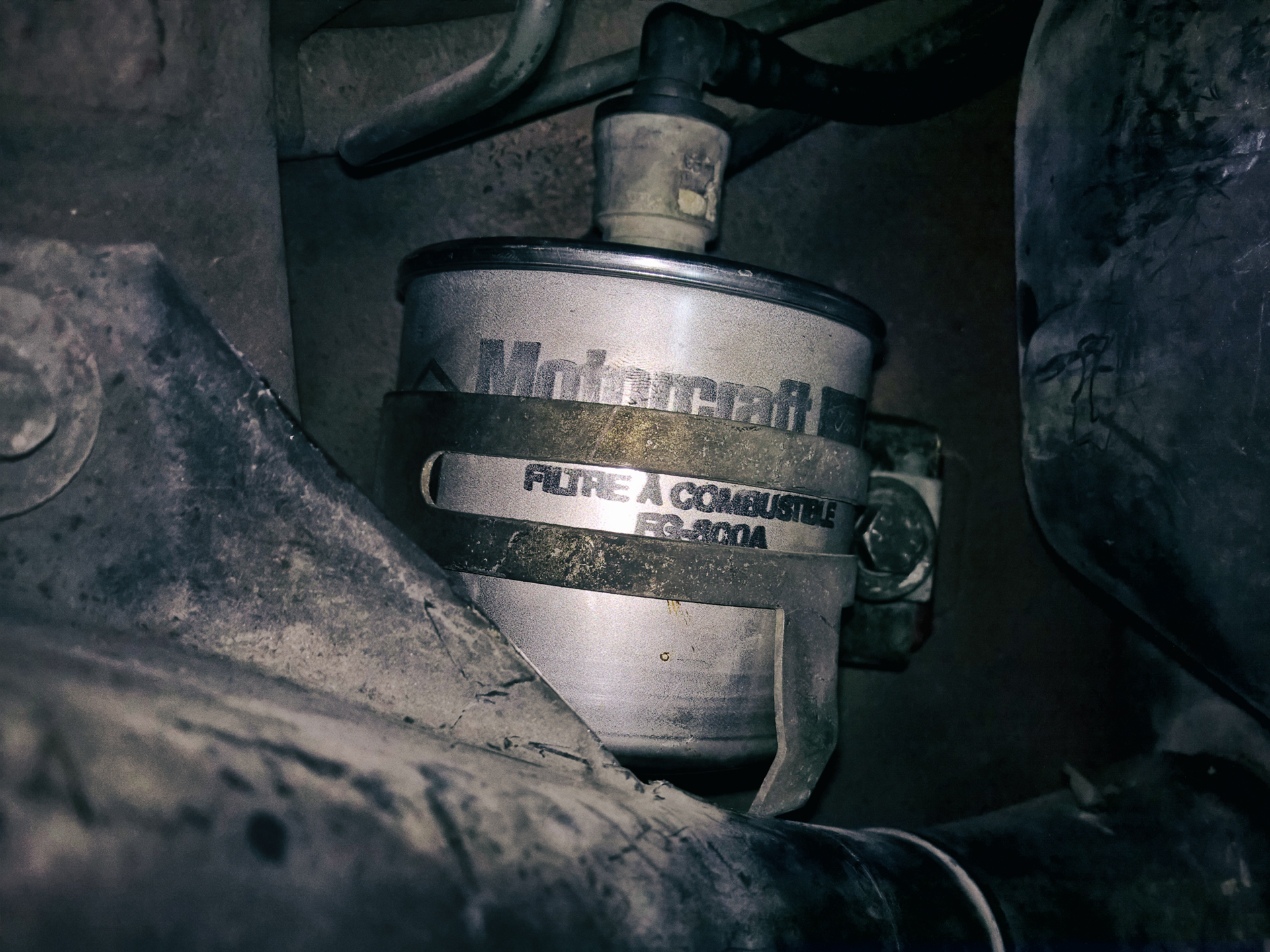
Motorcraft fuel filter

Today parts are designed and engineered to fit for installation on Lincoln, Mercury, and Ford vehicles. Some parts, such as Motorcraft's extensive list of oil filter applications, fit a wide variety of makes/models not built by Ford Motor Company.

Motorcraft products are sold through Ford and Lincoln-Mercury dealerships, as well as select auto parts stores.

Many times, Ford will approach a contract manufacturer of a particular product (many times a supplier to the company already) and work with them to create a version for sale under the Motorcraft name. These products must meet quality standards set by the Ford Motor Company to be considered for retail sale. Other brands such as Mazda use Motorcraft products in vehicles which both partner when producing. Although Motorcraft can only be contacted through the Ford website, Motorcraft parts and products can sometimes be used on other non-Ford vehicles.

== Motor oil ==
Motorcraft also sells motor oil for automotive use. As of the late 2000s, most of their oil is a synthetic blend or fully synthetic. Several weights are available, from 0W-20 all the way to 15W-40 for diesel engines.

== Automatic transmission fluid ==
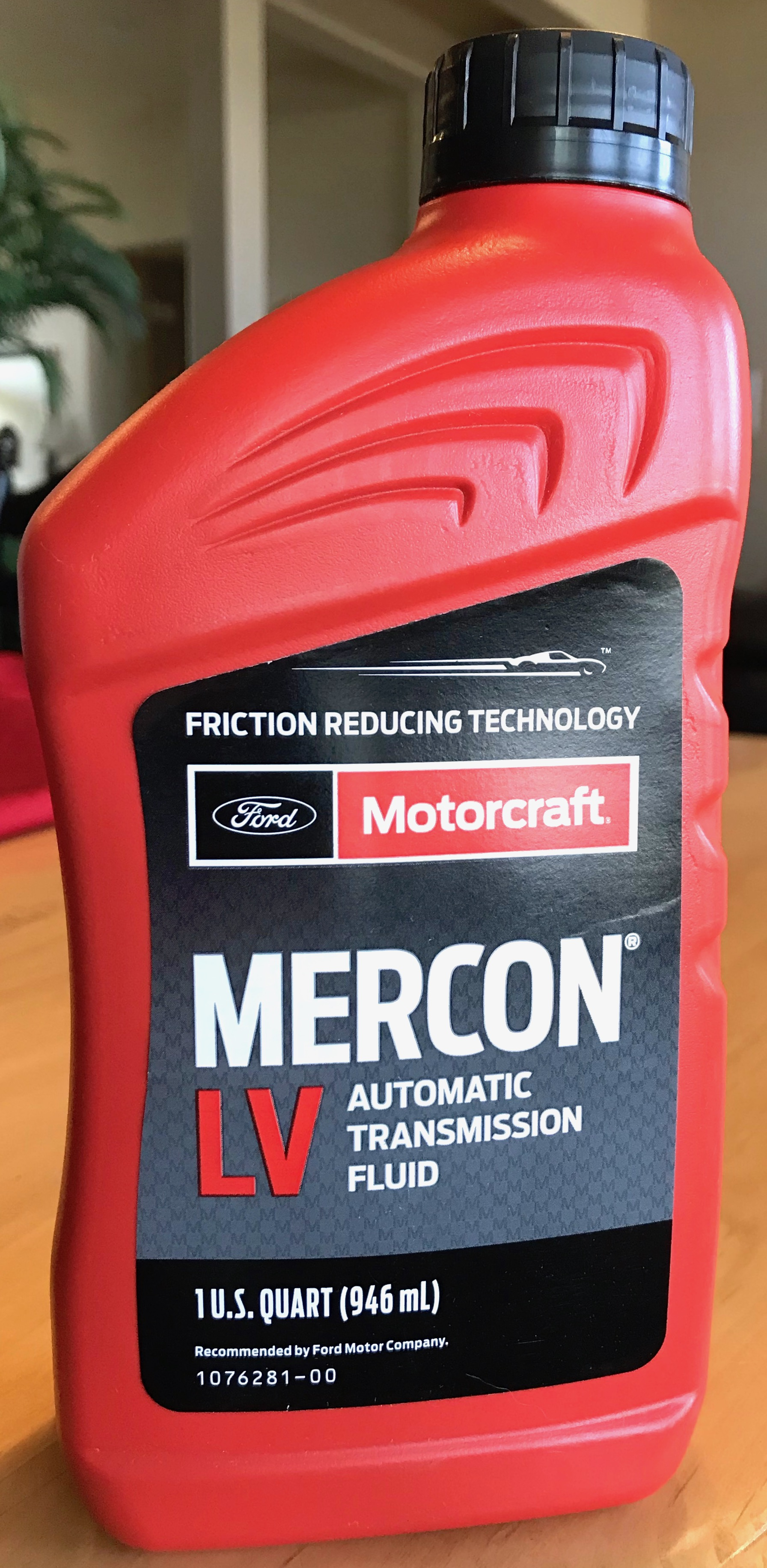
Bottle of automatic transmission fluid

Beginning in 1987, Motorcraft sold automatic transmission fluid under the MERCON brand name for automotive use. Motorcraft also sold automatic transmission fluid under the Motorcraft brand name from 1972 through 1987.

== See also ==
- Autolite (Ford's previous auto parts brand)
- MERCON (Ford's automatic transmission fluid)
- ACDelco (General Motors' auto parts brand)
- Mopar (Chrysler's auto parts brand)
- Denso (Japanese auto parts producer)
- Unipart (British Leyland/Rover Group auto parts brand)
