= Hoss Ellington =

American racing driver and team owner

- Born: Charles Everett Ellington; May 12, 1935; Raleigh, North Carolina, U.S.
- Died: May 31, 2014 (aged 79); Wilmington, North Carolina, U.S.
- Cause of death: Liver cancer

NASCAR Cup Series career
- 21 races run over 3 years
- Best finish: 30th (1969)
- First race: 1968 Dixie 500 (Atlanta)
- Last race: 1970 American 500 (Rockingham)
Wins	Top tens	Poles
0	4	0

Charles Everett "Hoss" Ellington (May 12, 1935 – May 31, 2014) was an American NASCAR driver and team owner. He married Betty Frances Hunt on April 17, 1959, at the Mount Pleasant Methodist Parsonage. They had three daughters: Monica Dale Ellington, Trellace Hunt Ellington, and Charla Frances Ellington. He made 31 starts as a driver between 1968 and 1970 in the Grand National Series, finishing in the top 10 four times, all in 1969. He later became a successful team owner, with five wins, four of them by Donnie Allison and the other one by David Pearson. His team also collected 52 top-fives and 92 top-ten finishes. He fielded cars for drivers such as Pearson, Fred Lorenzen, Cale Yarborough, A. J. Foyt, Donnie Allison, Kyle Petty, and Dale Jarrett, among others.

== Driver years ==
Born in Raleigh, North Carolina, Ellington made his NASCAR Grand National debut at the 1968 Dixie 500 at Atlanta Motor Speedway while driving his self-owned No. 61 Mercury; he finished in 31st place after suffering suspension failure after only 80 laps. He competed at two other races that year, at Darlington Raceway and Lowes Motor Speedway, finishing 17th and 34th, respectively. He ended up 61st in points.

In 1969, Ellington made his first start of the season at Rockingham, scoring his first career top ten with a tenth-place finish. He competed in 15 races, finishing in the top ten four times, including two career-best seventh-place finishes. In 1970, he made three more starts, at Charlotte, Darlington, and Rockingham, with a best finish of 13th that year. He then retired as a driver after the 1970 American 500 race in order to focus on being a team owner.

== Early years as a team owner ==
In 1972, Ellington began fielding cars as an owner for Fred Lorenzen. The car was numbered 28. Lorenzen ran seven races with the team. In Lorenzen's first start with the team, at Darlington, he finished 29th due to an engine failure. Lorenzen would later gather two top-fives and three top-tens, plus another top-five finish for Junie Donlavey. Later in the season, Ellington had Cale Yarborough run three races in the Ellington car, earning two top-tens, and John Sears ran one race for the team, finishing fifth. Between the three drivers, the team competed in 11 races, scoring three top-fives and six top-ten finishes.

In 1973, Ellington hired Ramo Stott, Charlie Glotzbach, and Gordon Johncock to drive for him, and the team again ran 11 races between the three drivers, but only scored one top-five and top-ten, with Johncock finishing fourth at the Firecracker 400 at Daytona. 1974 was much better for the team, with A. J. Foyt, Charlie Glotzbach, Bobby Isaac, and Sam McQuagg splitting up 15 races. Foyt and Glotzbach both scored a single top-five, Isaac finished in the top-ten three times with the team, and McQuagg scored two top-tens. The team scored two top-fives and seven top-tens in 15 races.

== Racing with Donnie Allison ==
1975 was when Donnie Allison made his first start with the team. He ran two races with Ellington, finishing third at Talladega in his first race with the team. A. J. Foyt ran seven races with Ellington, scoring an additional top five finish. Glotzbach, Isaac, and Johncock both returned for one race each, but the only top ten was with Glotzbach at Lowes Motor Speedway. The team competed in 12 races, and scored two top-fives and three top-tens. In 1976, Allison scored Ellington's first win as a team owner at Lowes Motor Speedway in the No. 1 car, a second team, as A. J. Foyt drove the familiar 28 in that race. Foyt also scored the first pole for the team in that year.

For 1977, Allison was hired as the sole driver for the team, with the main car renumbered No. 1. Allison repaid Ellington with three pole positions, as well as two wins and ten top-tens in 17 starts. He finished 24th in points despite running a partial schedule. 1978 was another successful year, with Allison winning at Atlanta and finishing 25th in points, again despite running a part-time schedule. The Atlanta win would be his last career win. Allison did not win at all in 1979, but he became a part of NASCAR history when he and Cale Yarborough crashed while racing for the lead on the last lap of the Daytona 500, when, after the wreck, Allison, Yarborough, and Allison's brother Bobby got into a fistfight in the grass infield in front of what was then the largest televised audience for a NASCAR race.

== Later years and end of team ==
Donnie Allison only drove three races for the team in 1980 before he left to join Kennie Childers's team. David Pearson ran nine races that year, winning once. It was the last win for both Pearson and Ellington's team. in 1981, Buddy Baker drove 15 races, scoring nine top-ten finishes and Pearson drove one race, finishing eighth. Four different drivers (Benny Parsons, Kyle Petty, Baker, and Allison) drove for Ellington. Of the 14 races the team ran, they only scored two top-ten finishes and one pole position, all by Baker. In 1983 and 1984, Lake Speed drove for the team. He ran 18 races in 1983 and 17 in 1984. Overall during Speed's time with Ellington, he scored four top-five finishes and 12 top-tens. Pearson returned for 8 races in 1985. Allison's nephew Davey ran 3 races, while Rick Wilson and Pancho Carter each ran one race. In 1986, Sterling Marlin ran a partial schedule for Ellington scoring two top-five finishes and four top-tens, including the Firecracker 400 where he led six laps and almost won, coming in second. In 1987, Brett Bodine and Ron Bouchard shared the car, with Bouchard scoring the only top-ten for the team all year. The team's last season was in 1988, when Dale Jarrett drove eight races for Ellington, with a best finish of 11th. In the team's last race the season finale at Atlanta, Jarrett qualified 34th, but finished 41st after crashing on the fifth lap. The team shut down after attempting to qualify for the 1989 Daytona 500 in an unsponsored Buick with driver Doug Heveron. Unfortunately, a blown engine on lap one of the Gatorade 125 Qualifying race forced the team to miss the race.

Ellington died on May 31, 2014, in Wilmington, North Carolina, after a lengthy illness.
