= 1987 Southern 500 =

21st race of the 1987 NASCAR Winston Cup Series

Race details
- Race 21 of 29 in the 1987 NASCAR Winston Cup Series
- The 1987 Southern 500 program cover, featuring Davey Allison, Kyle Petty, and Bill Elliott.
- Date: September 6, 1987
- Official name: 38th Annual Southern 500
- Location: Darlington Raceway, Darlington, South Carolina
- Course: Permanent racing facility
- Course length: 1.366 miles (2.198 km)
- Distance: 202 laps, 275.932 mi (444.070 km)
- Scheduled distance: 367 laps, 501.322 mi (806.800 km)
- Average speed: 115.520 miles per hour (185.911 km/h)
- Attendance: 75,000

Pole position
| Driver | Davey Allison | Ranier-Lundy Racing |
- Time: 31.276

Most laps led
| Driver | Dale Earnhardt | Richard Childress Racing |
- Laps: 109

Winner
| No. 3 | Dale Earnhardt | Richard Childress Racing |

Television in the United States
- Network: ESPN
- Announcers: Bob Jenkins, Chris Economaki

Radio in the United States
- Radio: Motor Racing Network

The 1987 Southern 500 was the 21st stock car race of the 1987 NASCAR Winston Cup Series season and the 38th iteration of the event. The race was held on Sunday, September 6, 1987, before an audience of 75,000 in Darlington, South Carolina, at Darlington Raceway, a 1.366-mile (2.198-kilometre) permanent egg-shaped oval racetrack. The race was shortened from its scheduled 367 laps to 202 laps due to rain.

Racing until the 198th lap, Richard Childress Racing's Dale Earnhardt managed to fend off challenges for the lead by owner-driver Richard Petty until a caution period was declared on lap 198. Four laps later, the race was red-flagged and not resumed, earning Earnhardt his 30th career NASCAR Winston Cup Series victory and his 10th victory of the season. To fill out the top three, Blue Max Racing's Rusty Wallace and Petty finished second and third, respectively.

== Background ==
The layout of Darlington Raceway, the venue where the race was held.

Darlington Raceway is a race track built for NASCAR racing located near Darlington, South Carolina. It is nicknamed "The Lady in Black" and "The Track Too Tough to Tame" by many NASCAR fans and drivers and advertised as "A NASCAR Tradition." It is of a unique, somewhat egg-shaped design, an oval with the ends of very different configurations, a condition which supposedly arose from the proximity of one end of the track to a minnow pond the owner refused to relocate. This situation makes it very challenging for the crews to set up their cars' handling in a way that is effective at both ends.

=== Entry list ===
- (R) denotes rookie driver.

| # | Driver | Team | Make | Sponsor |
|---|---|---|---|---|
| 1 | Brett Bodine | Ellington Racing | Chevrolet | Bull's-Eye Barbecue Sauce |
| 3 | Dale Earnhardt | Richard Childress Racing | Chevrolet | Wrangler |
| 4 | Rick Wilson | Morgan–McClure Motorsports | Oldsmobile | Kodak |
| 5 | Geoff Bodine | Hendrick Motorsports | Chevrolet | Levi Garrett |
| 6 | Derrike Cope (Note: Cope crashed the team's primary car during a preliminary practice session. As a result of the crash, Cope was replaced by Connie Saylor in the team's backup car.) (R) | U.S. Racing | Chevrolet | Slender You Figure Salons |
| 7 | Alan Kulwicki | AK Racing | Ford | Zerex |
| 8 | Bobby Hillin Jr. | Stavola Brothers Racing | Buick | Miller American |
| 9 | Bill Elliott | Melling Racing | Ford | Coors |
| 11 | Terry Labonte | Junior Johnson & Associates | Chevrolet | Budweiser |
| 12 | Trevor Boys | Hamby Racing | Chevrolet | Gorman's Esso Sales |
| 15 | Ricky Rudd | Bud Moore Engineering | Ford | Motorcraft Quality Parts |
| 17 | Darrell Waltrip | Hendrick Motorsports | Chevrolet | Tide |
| 18 | Dale Jarrett (R) | Freedlander Motorsports | Chevrolet | Freedlander Financial |
| 21 | Kyle Petty | Wood Brothers Racing | Ford | Citgo |
| 22 | Bobby Allison | Stavola Brothers Racing | Buick | Miller American |
| 25 | Tim Richmond (Note: Withdrew due to complications from a severe cold.) | Hendrick Motorsports | Chevrolet | Folgers |
| 26 | Morgan Shepherd | King Racing | Buick | Quaker State |
| 27 | Rusty Wallace | Blue Max Racing | Pontiac | Kodiak |
| 28 | Davey Allison (R) | Ranier-Lundy Racing | Ford | Texaco, Havoline |
| 29 | Cale Yarborough | Cale Yarborough Motorsports | Oldsmobile | Hardee's |
| 30 | Michael Waltrip | Bahari Racing | Chevrolet | All Pro Auto Parts |
| 32 | Jonathan Lee Edwards | Edwards Racing | Chevrolet | Edwards Racing |
| 33 | Harry Gant | Mach 1 Racing | Chevrolet | Skoal Bandit |
| 34 | Eddie Bierschwale | AAG Racing | Chevrolet | Allen's Glass |
| 35 | Benny Parsons | Hendrick Motorsports | Chevrolet | Folgers Decaf |
| 36 | H. B. Bailey | Bailey Racing | Pontiac | Almeda Auto Parts |
| 43 | Richard Petty | Petty Enterprises | Pontiac | STP |
| 44 | Sterling Marlin | Hagan Racing | Oldsmobile | Piedmont Airlines |
| 50 | Greg Sacks | Dingman Brothers Racing | Pontiac | Valvoline |
| 52 | Jimmy Means | Jimmy Means Racing | Pontiac | Eureka |
| 55 | Phil Parsons | Jackson Bros. Motorsports | Oldsmobile | Skoal Classic |
| 62 | Steve Christman (R) | Winkle Motorsports | Pontiac | AC Spark Plug |
| 64 | Rodney Combs | Langley Racing | Ford | Sunny King Ford |
| 67 | Buddy Arrington | Arrington Racing | Ford | Pannill Sweatshirts |
| 70 | J. D. McDuffie | McDuffie Racing | Pontiac | Rumple Furniture |
| 71 | Dave Marcis | Marcis Auto Racing | Chevrolet | Lifebuoy |
| 74 | Bobby Wawak | Wawak Racing | Chevrolet | Wawak Racing |
| 75 | Neil Bonnett | RahMoc Enterprises | Pontiac | Valvoline |
| 81 | Mike Potter | Fillip Racing | Chevrolet | Fillip Racing |
| 83 | Lake Speed | Speed Racing | Oldsmobile | Wynn's, Kmart |
| 88 | Buddy Baker | Baker–Schiff Racing | Oldsmobile | Crisco |
| 90 | Ken Schrader | Donlavey Racing | Ford | Red Baron Frozen Pizza |

== Qualifying ==
Qualifying was originally scheduled to be split into two rounds. The first round was held on Thursday, September 3, at 3:00 pm EST. Originally, the first 20 positions were going to be determined by first round qualifying, with positions 21–40 meant to be determined the following day on Friday, September 4. However, due to rain, the second round was cancelled. As a result, the rest of the starting lineup was set using the results from the first round. Depending on who needed it, a select amount of positions were given to cars who had not otherwise qualified but were high enough in owner's points; up to two were given.

Davey Allison, driving for Ranier-Lundy Racing, managed to win the pole, setting a time of 31.276 and an average speed of 157.232 miles per hour (253.040 km/h).

J. D. McDuffie was the only driver to fail to qualify, as he signed up later than U. S. Racing owner D. K. Ulrich. In the battle for the last position to qualify, four cars out of the 41-car entry list did not run laps during the first round. Two provisionals were given to Dale Jarrett and Brett Bodine for the 38th and 39th positions, leaving the 40th position to be determined by whichever car owner signed up for the race earlier. Due to Ulrich signing up earlier, his entry, driven by Connie Saylor, was given the 40th position.

=== Full qualifying results ===
| Pos. | # | Driver | Team | Make | Time | Speed |
|---|---|---|---|---|---|---|
| 1 | 28 | Davey Allison (R) | Ranier-Lundy Racing | Ford | 31.276 | 157.232 |
| 2 | 9 | Bill Elliott | Melling Racing | Ford | 31.425 | 156.487 |
| 3 | 11 | Terry Labonte | Junior Johnson & Associates | Chevrolet | 31.460 | 156.313 |
| 4 | 83 | Lake Speed | Speed Racing | Oldsmobile | 31.469 | 156.268 |
| 5 | 3 | Dale Earnhardt | Richard Childress Racing | Chevrolet | 31.547 | 155.882 |
| 6 | 7 | Alan Kulwicki | AK Racing | Ford | 31.762 | 154.827 |
| 7 | 17 | Darrell Waltrip | Hendrick Motorsports | Chevrolet | 31.889 | 154.210 |
| 8 | 4 | Rick Wilson | Morgan–McClure Motorsports | Oldsmobile | 31.893 | 154.191 |
| 9 | 35 | Benny Parsons | Hendrick Motorsports | Chevrolet | 31.919 | 154.065 |
| 10 | 33 | Harry Gant | Mach 1 Racing | Chevrolet | 31.919 | 154.065 |
| 11 | 22 | Bobby Allison | Stavola Brothers Racing | Buick | 31.945 | 153.940 |
| 12 | 15 | Ricky Rudd | Bud Moore Engineering | Ford | 31.956 | 153.887 |
| 13 | 50 | Greg Sacks | Dingman Brothers Racing | Pontiac | 32.013 | 153.613 |
| 14 | 43 | Richard Petty | Petty Enterprises | Pontiac | 32.065 | 153.363 |
| 15 | 26 | Morgan Shepherd | King Racing | Buick | 32.066 | 153.359 |
| 16 | 27 | Rusty Wallace | Blue Max Racing | Pontiac | 32.111 | 153.144 |
| 17 | 8 | Bobby Hillin Jr. | Stavola Brothers Racing | Buick | 32.121 | 153.096 |
| 18 | 90 | Ken Schrader | Donlavey Racing | Ford | 32.124 | 153.082 |
| 19 | 30 | Michael Waltrip | Bahari Racing | Chevrolet | 32.157 | 152.925 |
| 20 | 88 | Buddy Baker | Baker–Schiff Racing | Oldsmobile | 32.175 | 152.839 |
| 21 | 29 | Cale Yarborough | Cale Yarborough Motorsports | Oldsmobile | 32.193 | 152.754 |
| 22 | 55 | Phil Parsons | Jackson Bros. Motorsports | Oldsmobile | 32.265 | 152.413 |
| 23 | 75 | Neil Bonnett | RahMoc Enterprises | Pontiac | 32.312 | 152.191 |
| 24 | 44 | Sterling Marlin | Hagan Racing | Oldsmobile | 32.325 | 152.130 |
| 25 | 64 | Rodney Combs | Langley Racing | Ford | 32.378 | 151.881 |
| 26 | 21 | Kyle Petty | Wood Brothers Racing | Ford | 32.394 | 151.806 |
| 27 | 5 | Geoff Bodine | Hendrick Motorsports | Chevrolet | 32.404 | 151.759 |
| 28 | 71 | Dave Marcis | Marcis Auto Racing | Chevrolet | 32.484 | 151.385 |
| 29 | 52 | Jimmy Means | Jimmy Means Racing | Chevrolet | 32.497 | 151.325 |
| 30 | 12 | Trevor Boys | Hamby Racing | Oldsmobile | 32.515 | 151.241 |
| 31 | 34 | Eddie Bierschwale | AAG Racing | Chevrolet | 32.615 | 150.777 |
| 32 | 67 | Buddy Arrington | Arrington Racing | Ford | 32.631 | 150.703 |
| 33 | 36 | H. B. Bailey | Bailey Racing | Pontiac | 32.932 | 149.326 |
| 34 | 74 | Bobby Wawak | Wawak Racing | Chevrolet | 33.245 | 147.920 |
| 35 | 81 | Mike Potter | Fillip Racing | Ford | 33.552 | 146.567 |
| 36 | 32 | Jonathan Lee Edwards | Edwards Racing | Chevrolet | 33.605 | 146.335 |
| 37 | 62 | Steve Christman (R) | Winkle Motorsports | Pontiac | 33.615 | 146.292 |
Provisionals
| 38 | 18 | Dale Jarrett (R) | Freedlander Motorsports | Chevrolet | - | - |
| 39 | 1 | Brett Bodine | Ellington Racing | Chevrolet | - | - |
Qualified via earlier postmark entry sign-in time
| 40 | 6 | Connie Saylor | U.S. Racing | Oldsmobile | - | - |
Failed to qualify or withdrew
| 41 | 70 | J. D. McDuffie | McDuffie Racing | Pontiac | - | - |
| WD | 25 | Tim Richmond | Hendrick Motorsports | Chevrolet | - | - |
Official first round qualifying results
Official starting lineup

== Race results ==
| Fin | St | # | Driver | Team | Make | Laps | Led | Status | Pts | Winnings |
|---|---|---|---|---|---|---|---|---|---|---|
| 1 | 5 | 3 | Dale Earnhardt | Richard Childress Racing | Chevrolet | 202 | 109 | running | 185 | $64,650 |
| 2 | 16 | 27 | Rusty Wallace | Blue Max Racing | Pontiac | 202 | 0 | running | 170 | $33,695 |
| 3 | 14 | 43 | Richard Petty | Petty Enterprises | Pontiac | 202 | 2 | running | 170 | $22,530 |
| 4 | 24 | 44 | Sterling Marlin | Hagan Racing | Oldsmobile | 202 | 0 | running | 160 | $18,665 |
| 5 | 3 | 11 | Terry Labonte | Junior Johnson & Associates | Chevrolet | 202 | 0 | running | 155 | $19,945 |
| 6 | 17 | 8 | Bobby Hillin Jr. | Stavola Brothers Racing | Buick | 202 | 0 | running | 150 | $14,890 |
| 7 | 12 | 15 | Ricky Rudd | Bud Moore Engineering | Ford | 202 | 0 | running | 146 | $15,055 |
| 8 | 2 | 9 | Bill Elliott | Melling Racing | Ford | 202 | 1 | running | 147 | $15,215 |
| 9 | 15 | 26 | Morgan Shepherd | King Racing | Buick | 202 | 0 | running | 138 | $9,555 |
| 10 | 7 | 17 | Darrell Waltrip | Hendrick Motorsports | Chevrolet | 202 | 1 | running | 139 | $6,365 |
| 11 | 18 | 90 | Ken Schrader | Donlavey Racing | Ford | 202 | 0 | running | 130 | $9,765 |
| 12 | 22 | 55 | Phil Parsons | Jackson Bros. Motorsports | Oldsmobile | 202 | 0 | running | 127 | $4,535 |
| 13 | 21 | 29 | Cale Yarborough | Cale Yarborough Motorsports | Oldsmobile | 201 | 0 | running | 124 | $4,375 |
| 14 | 26 | 21 | Kyle Petty | Wood Brothers Racing | Ford | 200 | 0 | running | 121 | $11,215 |
| 15 | 38 | 18 | Dale Jarrett (R) | Freedlander Motorsports | Chevrolet | 200 | 0 | running | 118 | $9,110 |
| 16 | 28 | 71 | Dave Marcis | Marcis Auto Racing | Chevrolet | 200 | 0 | running | 115 | $7,750 |
| 17 | 20 | 88 | Buddy Baker | Baker–Schiff Racing | Oldsmobile | 199 | 0 | distributor | 112 | $3,755 |
| 18 | 27 | 5 | Geoff Bodine | Hendrick Motorsports | Chevrolet | 199 | 0 | running | 109 | $9,310 |
| 19 | 19 | 30 | Michael Waltrip | Bahari Racing | Chevrolet | 198 | 0 | running | 106 | $7,135 |
| 20 | 39 | 1 | Brett Bodine | Ellington Racing | Chevrolet | 195 | 0 | running | 103 | $3,855 |
| 21 | 37 | 62 | Steve Christman (R) | Winkle Motorsports | Pontiac | 195 | 0 | running | 100 | $3,050 |
| 22 | 29 | 52 | Jimmy Means | Jimmy Means Racing | Chevrolet | 195 | 0 | running | 97 | $6,365 |
| 23 | 34 | 74 | Bobby Wawak | Wawak Racing | Chevrolet | 194 | 0 | running | 94 | $2,850 |
| 24 | 32 | 67 | Buddy Arrington | Arrington Racing | Ford | 193 | 0 | running | 91 | $5,960 |
| 25 | 31 | 34 | Eddie Bierschwale | AAG Racing | Chevrolet | 192 | 0 | running | 88 | $2,760 |
| 26 | 11 | 22 | Bobby Allison | Stavola Brothers Racing | Buick | 185 | 0 | engine | 85 | $9,570 |
| 27 | 25 | 64 | Rodney Combs | Langley Racing | Ford | 185 | 0 | running | 82 | $5,525 |
| 28 | 8 | 4 | Rick Wilson | Morgan–McClure Motorsports | Oldsmobile | 176 | 0 | running | 79 | $2,385 |
| 29 | 1 | 28 | Davey Allison (R) | Ranier-Lundy Racing | Ford | 164 | 86 | accident | 81 | $6,545 |
| 30 | 4 | 83 | Lake Speed | Speed Racing | Oldsmobile | 163 | 0 | accident | 73 | $2,240 |
| 31 | 9 | 35 | Benny Parsons | Hendrick Motorsports | Chevrolet | 162 | 3 | accident | 75 | $12,290 |
| 32 | 23 | 75 | Neil Bonnett | RahMoc Enterprises | Pontiac | 156 | 0 | running | 67 | $4,805 |
| 33 | 35 | 81 | Mike Potter | Fillip Racing | Ford | 153 | 0 | accident | 64 | $1,975 |
| 34 | 40 | 6 | Connie Saylor | U.S. Racing | Oldsmobile | 140 | 0 | fatigue | 61 | $4,690 |
| 35 | 33 | 36 | H. B. Bailey | Bailey Racing | Pontiac | 133 | 0 | fatigue | 58 | $1,855 |
| 36 | 30 | 12 | Trevor Boys | Hamby Racing | Oldsmobile | 126 | 0 | accident | 0 | $4,560 |
| 37 | 36 | 32 | Jonathan Lee Edwards | Edwards Racing | Chevrolet | 122 | 0 | engine | 52 | $1,755 |
| 38 | 13 | 50 | Greg Sacks | Dingman Brothers Racing | Pontiac | 96 | 0 | engine | 49 | $1,705 |
| 39 | 10 | 33 | Harry Gant | Mach 1 Racing | Chevrolet | 85 | 0 | clutch | 46 | $4,395 |
| 40 | 6 | 7 | Alan Kulwicki | AK Racing | Ford | 77 | 0 | engine | 43 | $4,500 |
Failed to qualify or withdrew
| 41 | | 70 | J. D. McDuffie | McDuffie Racing | Pontiac | | | | | |
| WD | | 25 | Tim Richmond | Hendrick Motorsports | Chevrolet | | | | | |
Official race results

== Standings after the race ==
Drivers' Championship standings

| | Pos | Driver | Points |
|---|---|---|---|
| | 1 | Dale Earnhardt | 3,521 |
| | 2 | Bill Elliott | 2,938 (-583) |
| | 3 | Terry Labonte | 2,872 (-649) |
| | 4 | Rusty Wallace | 2,825 (–696) |
| 1 | 5 | Darrell Waltrip | 2,723 (–798) |
| 1 | 6 | Ricky Rudd | 2,713 (–808) |
| 2 | 7 | Neil Bonnett | 2,708 (–813) |
| | 8 | Kyle Petty | 2,663 (–858) |
| | 9 | Richard Petty | 2,653 (–868) |
| | 10 | Ken Schrader | 2,558 (–963) |
Official driver's standings

- Note: Only the first 10 positions are included for the driver standings.

== Notes ==
| Previous race: 1987 Busch 500 | NASCAR Winston Cup Series; 1987 season | Next race: 1987 Wrangler Jeans Indigo 400 |
