= IROC XVI =

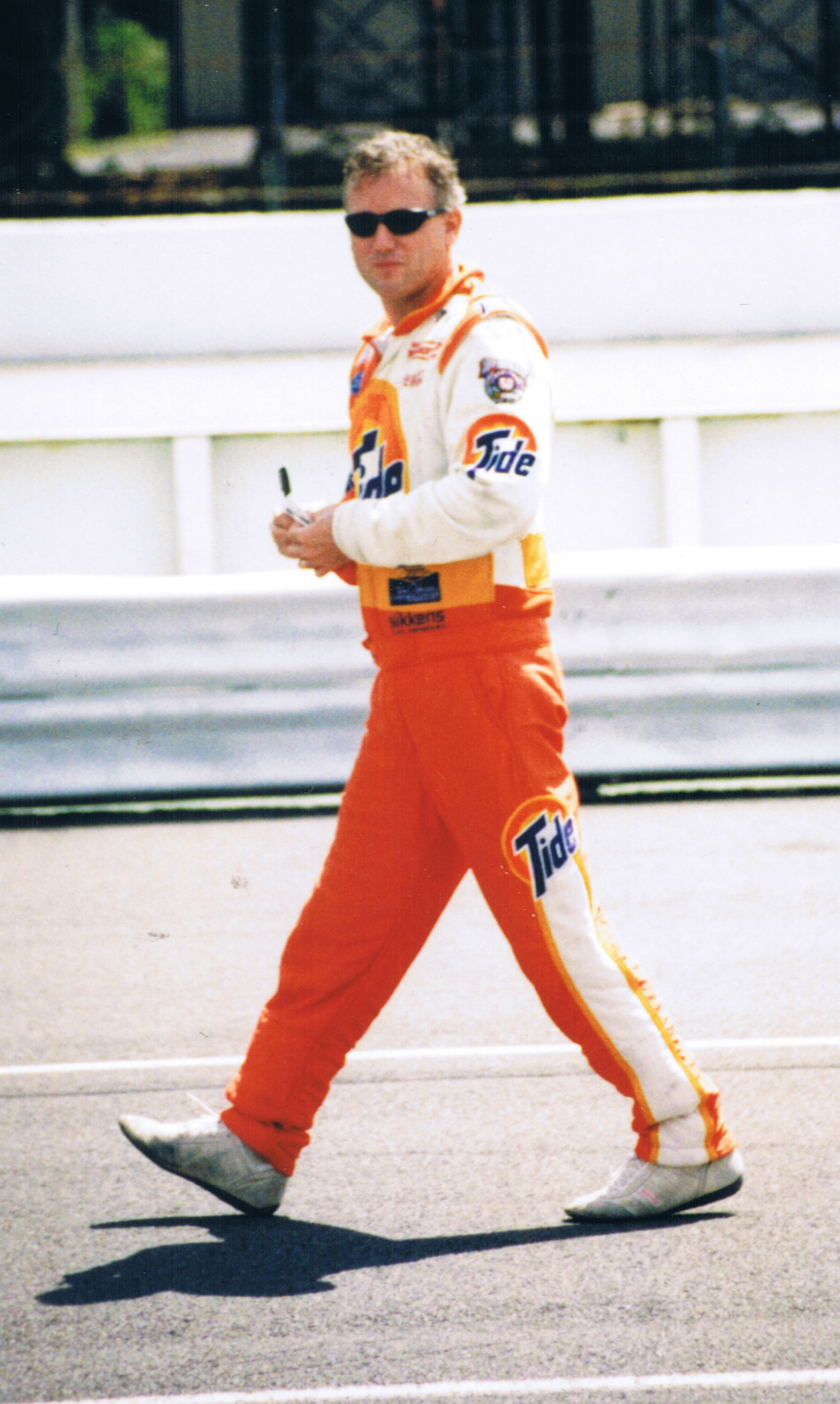
Ricky Rudd (seen in 1998), the IROC XVI champion

IROC XVI was the sixteenth year of IROC competition, which took place in 1992. It was the third year the Dodge Daytona was used in competition, and continued the format introduced in IROC VIII. Race one took place on the Daytona International Speedway, race two took place at Talladega Superspeedway, and races three and four ran at Michigan International Speedway. Ricky Rudd won the series championship and $175,000, despite not winning a race.

The roster of drivers and final points standings were as follows:

| Rank | Driver | Points | Winnings | Series |
|---|---|---|---|---|
| 1 | (United States) Ricky Rudd | 68.5 | $175,000 | NASCAR Winston Cup |
| 2 | (United States) Dale Earnhardt | 63 | $65,000 | NASCAR Winston Cup |
| 3 | (United States) Al Unser Jr. | 59 | $55,000 | CART |
| 4 | (United States) Rusty Wallace | 47 | $50,000 | NASCAR Winston Cup; Defending IROC Champion |
| 5 | (United States) Harry Gant | 46.5 | $45,000 | NASCAR Winston Cup |
| 6 | (Australia) Geoff Brabham | 46 | $40,000 | IMSA Camel GT |
| 7 | (United States) Davey Allison^{1} | 42 | $40,000 | NASCAR Winston Cup |
| 8 | (United States) Davy Jones | 33 | $40,000 | IMSA Camel GT |
| 9 | (United States) Scott Pruett^{2} | 27 | $40,000 | CART |
| 10 | (United States) Hurley Haywood^{2} | 27 | $40,000 | IMSA Camel GT |
| 11 | (United States) Pete Halsmer | 22 | $40,000 | IMSA Camel GT |
| 12 | (Netherlands) Arie Luyendyk | 21 | $40,000 | CART |

== Race results ==
=== Race One, Daytona International Speedway ===
Friday, February 14, 1992

| Finish | Grid | Car no. | Driver | Car Make | Car Color | Laps | Status | Laps Led | Points |
|---|---|---|---|---|---|---|---|---|---|
| 1 | 7 | 7 | (United States) Dale Earnhardt | Dodge Daytona | Powder Blue | 40 | 0:32:52 | 12 | 24** |
| 2 | 10 | 10 | (United States) Ricky Rudd ^{3} | Dodge Daytona | White | 40 | Running | 17 | 22* |
| 2 | 11 | 11 | (United States) Harry Gant ^{3} | Dodge Daytona | Red | 40 | Running | | 17 |
| 4 | 9 | 9 | (United States) Davey Allison | Dodge Daytona | Light Orange | 40 | Running | 3 | 12 |
| 5 | 8 | 8 | (United States) Hurley Haywood | Dodge Daytona | Gold | 40 | Running | | 10 |
| 6 | 4 | 4 | (United States) Al Unser Jr. | Dodge Daytona | Purple | 40 | Running | 7 | 11*** |
| 7 | 1 | 1 | (Australia) Geoff Brabham | Dodge Daytona | Lime | 40 | Running | | 8 |
| 8 | 2 | 2 | (United States) Rusty Wallace | Dodge Daytona | Blue | 40 | Running | 1 | 7 |
| 9 | 3 | 3 | (United States) Davey Jones | Dodge Daytona | Orange | 40 | Running | | 6 |
| 10 | 12 | 12 | (Netherlands) Arie Luyendyk | Dodge Daytona | Pink | 40 | Running | | 5 |
| 11 | 5 | 5 | (United States) Pete Halsmer | Dodge Daytona | Mint | 32 | Crash | | 4 |
| 12 | 6 | 6 | (United States) Scott Pruett | Dodge Daytona | Tan | 32 | Mechanical | | 3 |

one *: Bonus points for leading the most laps.
two **: Bonus points for leading the 2nd most laps.
three ***: Bonus points for leading the 3rd most laps.

Average speed: 182.556 mph
Cautions: 1 (Lap 33, Pete Halsmer crash)
Margin of victory: .5 cl
Lead changes: 18

=== Race Two, Talladega Superspeedway ===
Saturday, May 2, 1992

| Finish | Grid | Car no. | Driver | Car Make | Car Color | Laps | Status | Laps Led | Points |
|---|---|---|---|---|---|---|---|---|---|
| 1 | 8 | 4 | (United States) Davey Allison | Dodge Daytona | Silver | 38 | 0:31:38 | 9 | 24** |
| 2 | 11 | 1 | (United States) Dale Earnhardt | Dodge Daytona | Purple | 38 | Running | 9 | 20** |
| 3 | 10 | 2 | (United States) Ricky Rudd | Dodge Daytona | Lime | 38 | Running | | 14 |
| 4 | 3 | 9 | (United States) Davy Jones | Dodge Daytona | White | 38 | Running | | 12 |
| 5 | 9 | 3 | (United States) Harry Gant | Dodge Daytona | Mustard | 38 | Running | 5 | 10 |
| 6 | 4 | 8 | (United States) Rusty Wallace | Dodge Daytona | Black | 38 | Running | | 9 |
| 7 | 6 | 6 | (United States) Al Unser Jr. | Dodge Daytona | Gold | 38 | Running | 12 | 13* |
| 8 | 7 | 5 | (United States) Hurley Haywood | Dodge Daytona | Medium Blue | 38 | Running | | 7 |
| 9 | 5 | 7 | (Australia) Geoff Brabham | Dodge Daytona | Powder Blue | 38 | Running | | 6 |
| 10 | 1 | 12 | (United States) Scott Pruett | Dodge Daytona | Red | 38 | Running | 2 | 5 |
| 11 | 2 | 10 | (Netherlands) Arie Luyendyk | Dodge Daytona | Orange | 15 | Crash | | 4 |
| 12 | X | 11 | (United States) Pete Halsmer ^{4} | Dodge Daytona | Pink | 0 | Did Not Start, Injured | | 3 |

one *: Bonus points for leading the most laps.
two **: Bonus points for leading the 2nd most laps.
three ***: Bonus points for leading the 3rd most laps (did not occur in this race so not awarded).

Average speed: 191.722 mph
Cautions: 1 (Lap 15, Arie Luyendyk crash)
Margin of victory: .25 cl
Lead changes: 15

=== Race Three, Michigan International Speedway ===
Saturday, August 1, 1992

| Finish | Grid | Car no. | Driver | Car Make | Car Color | Laps | Status | Laps Led | Points |
|---|---|---|---|---|---|---|---|---|---|
| 1 | 4 | 9 | (Australia) Geoff Brabham | Dodge Daytona | Tan | 50 | 0:38:03 | 35 | 26* |
| 2 | 5 | 8 | (United States) Rusty Wallace | Dodge Daytona | Light Orange | 50 | Running | | 17 |
| 3 | 10 | 3 | (United States) Ricky Rudd | Dodge Daytona | Aqua | 50 | Running | 13 | 17** |
| 4 | 9 | 4 | (United States) Harry Gant | Dodge Daytona | Powder Blue | 50 | Running | | 12 |
| 5 | 11 | 1 | (United States) Dale Earnhardt | Dodge Daytona | Orange | 50 | Running | | 10 |
| 6 | 8 | 5 | (United States) Al Unser Jr. | Dodge Daytona | Blue | 50 | Running | | 9 |
| 7 | 7 | 6 | (United States) Davy Jones | Dodge Daytona | Yellow | 50 | Running | | 8 |
| 8 | 1 | 12 | (United States) Pete Halsmer | Dodge Daytona | Orange | 50 | Running | | 7 |
| 9 | 6 | 7 | (United States) Hurley Haywood | Dodge Daytona | Silver | 50 | Running | | 6 |
| 10 | 2 | 11 | (United States) Scott Pruett | Dodge Daytona | White | 50 | Running | 2 | 7*** |
| 11 | 3 | 10 | (Netherlands) Arie Luyendyk | Dodge Daytona | Black | 50 | Running | | 4 |
| 12 | 12 | 2 | (United States) Davey Allison ^{5} | Dodge Daytona | Red | 0 | Did Not Start, Injured | | 3 |

one *: Bonus points for leading the most laps.
two **: Bonus points for leading the 2nd most laps.
three ***: Bonus points for leading the 3rd most laps.

Average speed: 157.654 mph
Cautions: none
Margin of victory: 2.6 sec
Lead changes: 3

=== Race Four, Michigan International Speedway ===
Saturday, August 15, 1992

| Finish | Grid | Car no. | Driver | Car Make | Car Color | Laps | Status | Laps Led | Points |
|---|---|---|---|---|---|---|---|---|---|
| 1 | 6 | 7 | (United States) Al Unser Jr. | Dodge Daytona | Red | 50 | 0:37:47 | 49 | 26* |
| 2 | 10 | 2 | (United States) Ricky Rudd | Dodge Daytona | Bright Blue | 50 | Running | | 17 |
| 3 | 7 | 6 | (United States) Rusty Wallace | Dodge Daytona | Gold | 50 | Running | | 14 |
| 4 | 3 | 10 | (United States) Scott Pruett | Dodge Daytona | Lime | 50 | Running | | 12 |
| 5 | 11 | 1 | (United States) Dale Earnhardt | Dodge Daytona | Orange | 50 | Running | | 10 |
| 6 | 8 | 5 | (United States) Harry Gant | Dodge Daytona | Powder Blue | 50 | Running | | 9 |
| 7 | 2 | 11 | (United States) Pete Halsmer | Dodge Daytona | Bright Orange | 50 | Running | | 8 |
| 8 | 5 | 8 | (United States) Davy Jones | Dodge Daytona | Silver | 50 | Running | | 7 |
| 9 | 9 | 3 | (Australia) Geoff Brabham | Dodge Daytona | Rose | 50 | Running | | 6 |
| 10 | 1 | 12 | (Netherlands) Arie Luyendyk | Dodge Daytona | Yellow | 50 | Running | 1 | 8** |
| 11 | 4 | 9 | (United States) Hurley Haywood | Dodge Daytona | White | 50 | Running | | 4 |
| 12 | 12 | 4 | (United States) Davey Allison ^{5} | Dodge Daytona | Light Orange | 0 | Did Not Start, Injured | | 3 |

one *: Bonus points for leading the most laps.
two **: Bonus points for leading the 2nd most laps.
three ***: Bonus points for leading the 3rd most laps (did not occur in this race so not awarded).

Average speed: 158.8 mph
Cautions: none
Margin of victory: 1 cl
Lead changes: 1

== Notes ==
1. Davey Allison withdrew from the series due to injury after the first two races.
2. Scott Pruett and Hurley Haywood tied for ninth place in the final championship standings, but the position was awarded to Pruett due to a higher finishing position in the final race
3. Second place between Harry Gant and Ricky Rudd was declared a dead heat & both drives were awarded 2nd place points.
4. Pete Halsmer did not start race two due to injury, and received last place points.
5. Davey Allison withdrew from the series due to injury after the first two races, and was awarded last place points for the final two races.
