= 1987 Busch 500 =

20th race of the 1987 NASCAR Winston Cup Series

Race details
- Race 20 of 29 in the 1987 NASCAR Winston Cup Series
- The 1987 Busch 500 program cover, featuring Darrell Waltrip and Terry Labonte.
- Date: August 22, 1987
- Official name: 27th Annual Busch 500
- Location: Bristol, Tennessee, Bristol International Speedway
- Course: Permanent racing facility
- Course length: 0.533 miles (0.858 km)
- Distance: 500 laps, 266.5 mi (428.89 km)
- Scheduled distance: 500 laps, 266.5 mi (428.89 km)
- Average speed: 90.373 miles per hour (145.441 km/h)
- Attendance: 48,477

Pole position
Driver	Terry Labonte	Junior Johnson & Associates
- Time: 16.576

Most laps led
Driver	Dale Earnhardt	Richard Childress Racing
- Laps: 415

Winner
No. 3	Dale Earnhardt	Richard Childress Racing

Television in the United States
- Network: ESPN
- Announcers: Bob Jenkins, Larry Nuber

Radio in the United States
- Radio: Motor Racing Network

The 1987 Busch 500 was the 20th stock car race of the 1987 NASCAR Winston Cup Series season and the 27th iteration of the event. The race was held on Saturday, August 22, 1987, before an audience of 48,477 in Bristol, Tennessee, at Bristol International Speedway, a 0.533 miles (0.858 km) permanent oval-shaped racetrack. The race took the scheduled 500 laps to complete.

At race's end, Richard Childress Racing's Dale Earnhardt managed to dominate a majority of the race, leading 415 laps to take his 29th career NASCAR Winston Cup Series victory and his ninth victory of the season. With the victory, Earnhardt was able to increase his driver's championship lead over Bill Elliott to 545 points. To fill out the top three, Blue Max Racing's Rusty Wallace and Bud Moore Engineering's Ricky Rudd finished second and third, respectively.

== Background ==
The layout of Bristol Motor Speedway, the venue where the race was held.

The Bristol Motor Speedway, formerly known as Bristol International Raceway and Bristol Raceway, is a NASCAR short track venue located in Bristol, Tennessee. Constructed in 1960, it held its first NASCAR race on July 30, 1961. Despite its short length, Bristol is among the most popular tracks on the NASCAR schedule because of its distinct features, which include extraordinarily steep banking, an all concrete surface, two pit roads, and stadium-like seating. It has also been named one of the loudest NASCAR tracks.

=== Entry list ===
- (R) denotes rookie driver.

#	Driver	Team	Make	Sponsor
3	Dale Earnhardt	Richard Childress Racing	Chevrolet	Wrangler
4	Rick Wilson	Morgan–McClure Motorsports	Oldsmobile	Kodak
5	Geoff Bodine	Hendrick Motorsports	Chevrolet	Levi Garrett
6	Troy Beebe	U.S. Racing	Chevrolet	U.S. Racing
7	Alan Kulwicki	AK Racing	Ford	Zerex
8	Bobby Hillin Jr.	Stavola Brothers Racing	Buick	Miller American
9	Bill Elliott	Melling Racing	Ford	Coors
11	Terry Labonte	Junior Johnson & Associates	Chevrolet	Budweiser
12	Brad Teague	Hamby Racing	Chevrolet	Slender You Figure Salons
15	Ricky Rudd	Bud Moore Engineering	Ford	Motorcraft Quality Parts
17	Darrell Waltrip	Hendrick Motorsports	Chevrolet	Tide
18	Dale Jarrett (R)	Freedlander Motorsports	Chevrolet	Freedlander Financial
19	Derrike Cope (R)	Stoke Racing	Ford	Stoke Racing
21	Kyle Petty	Wood Brothers Racing	Ford	Citgo
22	Bobby Allison	Stavola Brothers Racing	Buick	Miller American
26	Morgan Shepherd	King Racing	Buick	Quaker State
27	Rusty Wallace	Blue Max Racing	Pontiac	Kodiak
30	Michael Waltrip	Bahari Racing	Chevrolet	All Pro Auto Parts
33	Harry Gant	Mach 1 Racing	Chevrolet	Skoal Bandit
35	Benny Parsons	Hendrick Motorsports	Chevrolet	Folgers Decaf
41	Ronnie Thomas	Ronnie Thomas Racing	Chevrolet	Busch Enterprises
43	Richard Petty	Petty Enterprises	Pontiac	STP
44	Sterling Marlin	Hagan Racing	Oldsmobile	Piedmont Airlines
48	Tony Spanos	Hylton Motorsports	Chevrolet	Hylton Motorsports
52	Jimmy Means	Jimmy Means Racing	Pontiac	Eureka
55	Phil Parsons	Jackson Bros. Motorsports	Oldsmobile	Skoal Classic
62	Steve Christman (R)	Winkle Motorsports	Pontiac	AC Spark Plug
64	Rodney Combs	Langley Racing	Ford	Sunny King Ford
67	Buddy Arrington	Arrington Racing	Ford	Pannill Sweatshirts
70	J. D. McDuffie	McDuffie Racing	Pontiac	Rumple Furniture
71	Dave Marcis	Marcis Auto Racing	Chevrolet	Lifebuoy
75	Neil Bonnett	RahMoc Enterprises	Pontiac	Valvoline
81	Mike Potter	Fillip Racing	Chevrolet	Fillip Racing
90	Ken Schrader	Donlavey Racing	Ford	Red Baron Frozen Pizza

== Qualifying ==
Qualifying was split into two rounds. The first round was held on Friday, August 21, at 7:35 p.m. EST. Each driver had one lap to set a time. During the first round, the top 15 drivers in the round were guaranteed a starting spot in the race. If a driver was not able to guarantee a spot in the first round, they had the option to scrub their time from the first round and try and run a faster lap time in a second round qualifying run, held on Saturday, August 22, at 1:00 p.m. EST. As with the first round, each driver had one lap to set a time. For this specific race, positions 16-30 were decided on time, and depending on who needed it, a select amount of positions were given to cars who had not otherwise qualified but were high enough in owner's points; up to two provisionals were given.

Terry Labonte, driving for Junior Johnson & Associates, managed to win the pole, setting a time of 16.576 and an average speed of 115.758 miles per hour (186.294 km/h) in the first round.

Four drivers failed to qualify.

=== Full qualifying results ===
Pos.	#	Driver	Team	Make	Time	Speed
1	11	Terry Labonte	Junior Johnson & Associates	Chevrolet	16.576	115.758
2	5	Geoff Bodine	Hendrick Motorsports	Chevrolet	16.729	114.699
3	90	Ken Schrader	Donlavey Racing	Ford	16.736	114.651
4	7	Alan Kulwicki	AK Racing	Ford	16.742	114.610
5	33	Harry Gant	Mach 1 Racing	Chevrolet	16.742	114.610
6	3	Dale Earnhardt	Richard Childress Racing	Chevrolet	16.765	114.453
7	15	Ricky Rudd	Bud Moore Engineering	Ford	16.777	114.371
8	27	Rusty Wallace	Blue Max Racing	Pontiac	16.797	114.235
9	17	Darrell Waltrip	Hendrick Motorsports	Chevrolet	16.811	114.140
10	71	Dave Marcis	Marcis Auto Racing	Chevrolet	16.845	113.909
11	44	Sterling Marlin	Hagan Racing	Oldsmobile	16.904	113.512
12	30	Michael Waltrip	Bahari Racing	Chevrolet	16.920	113.404
13	35	Benny Parsons	Hendrick Motorsports	Chevrolet	16.943	113.250
14	22	Bobby Allison	Stavola Brothers Racing	Buick	16.968	113.083
15	9	Bill Elliott	Melling Racing	Ford	16.979	113.010
Failed to lock in Round 1
16	4	Rick Wilson	Morgan–McClure Motorsports	Oldsmobile	16.989	112.944
17	21	Kyle Petty	Wood Brothers Racing	Ford	17.011	112.798
18	8	Bobby Hillin Jr.	Stavola Brothers Racing	Buick	17.047	112.559
19	75	Neil Bonnett	RahMoc Enterprises	Pontiac	17.069	112.414
20	43	Richard Petty	Petty Enterprises	Pontiac	17.101	112.204
21	26	Morgan Shepherd	King Racing	Buick	17.104	112.184
22	55	Phil Parsons	Jackson Bros. Motorsports	Oldsmobile	17.125	112.047
23	18	Dale Jarrett (R)	Freedlander Motorsports	Chevrolet	17.172	111.740
24	12	Brad Teague	Hamby Racing	Oldsmobile	17.249	111.241
25	52	Jimmy Means	Jimmy Means Racing	Pontiac	17.260	111.170
26	62	Steve Christman (R)	Winkle Motorsports	Pontiac	17.261	111.164
27	41	Ronnie Thomas	Ronnie Thomas Racing	Chevrolet	17.355	110.562
28	19	Derrike Cope (R)	Stoke Racing	Ford	17.442	110.010
29	67	Buddy Arrington	Arrington Racing	Ford	17.509	109.589
30	64	Rodney Combs	Langley Racing	Ford	17.574	109.184
Failed to qualify
31	6	Troy Beebe	U.S. Racing	Chevrolet	17.679	108.536
32	70	J. D. McDuffie	McDuffie Racing	Pontiac	17.791	107.852
33	48	Tony Spanos	Hylton Motorsports	Chevrolet	18.207	105.388
34	81	Mike Potter	Fillip Racing	Chevrolet	18.835	101.874
Official first round qualifying results
Official starting lineup

== Race results ==
Fin	St	#	Driver	Team	Make	Laps	Led	Status	Pts	Winnings
1	6	3	Dale Earnhardt	Richard Childress Racing	Chevrolet	500	415	running	185	$47,175
2	8	27	Rusty Wallace	Blue Max Racing	Pontiac	500	1	running	175	$26,300
3	7	15	Ricky Rudd	Bud Moore Engineering	Ford	500	0	running	165	$20,275
4	1	11	Terry Labonte	Junior Johnson & Associates	Chevrolet	500	56	running	165	$17,500
5	20	43	Richard Petty	Petty Enterprises	Pontiac	500	2	running	160	$10,030
6	2	5	Geoff Bodine	Hendrick Motorsports	Chevrolet	497	0	running	150	$9,725
7	16	4	Rick Wilson	Morgan–McClure Motorsports	Oldsmobile	496	0	running	146	$2,925
8	5	33	Harry Gant	Mach 1 Racing	Chevrolet	495	0	running	142	$6,255
9	15	9	Bill Elliott	Melling Racing	Ford	494	0	running	138	$9,725
10	19	75	Neil Bonnett	RahMoc Enterprises	Pontiac	494	0	running	134	$6,910
11	4	7	Alan Kulwicki	AK Racing	Ford	493	5	running	135	$6,325
12	23	18	Dale Jarrett (R)	Freedlander Motorsports	Chevrolet	491	0	running	127	$5,810
13	25	52	Jimmy Means	Jimmy Means Racing	Pontiac	486	0	running	124	$4,845
14	12	30	Michael Waltrip	Bahari Racing	Chevrolet	484	0	running	121	$4,635
15	26	62	Steve Christman (R)	Winkle Motorsports	Pontiac	482	0	running	118	$2,025
16	28	19	Derrike Cope (R)	Stoke Racing	Ford	482	0	running	115	$2,075
17	29	67	Buddy Arrington	Arrington Racing	Ford	468	0	running	112	$4,275
18	10	71	Dave Marcis	Marcis Auto Racing	Chevrolet	442	0	running	109	$4,115
19	22	55	Phil Parsons	Jackson Bros. Motorsports	Oldsmobile	415	0	running	106	$1,425
20	11	44	Sterling Marlin	Hagan Racing	Oldsmobile	405	0	crash	103	$4,155
21	9	17	Darrell Waltrip	Hendrick Motorsports	Chevrolet	403	1	running	105	$2,725
22	14	22	Bobby Allison	Stavola Brothers Racing	Buick	344	0	engine	97	$6,955
23	30	64	Rodney Combs	Langley Racing	Ford	315	0	engine	94	$3,415
24	21	26	Morgan Shepherd	King Racing	Buick	242	0	crash	91	$3,385
25	24	12	Brad Teague	Hamby Racing	Oldsmobile	216	0	oil pressure	0	$3,455
26	13	35	Benny Parsons	Hendrick Motorsports	Chevrolet	200	0	engine	85	$9,075
27	3	90	Ken Schrader	Donlavey Racing	Ford	179	20	crash	87	$3,455
28	17	21	Kyle Petty	Wood Brothers Racing	Ford	158	0	engine	79	$6,835
29	18	8	Bobby Hillin Jr.	Stavola Brothers Racing	Buick	118	0	engine	76	$6,815
30	27	41	Ronnie Thomas	Ronnie Thomas Racing	Chevrolet	16	0	overheating	73	$1,095
Failed to qualify
31		6	Troy Beebe	U.S. Racing	Chevrolet					
32		70	J. D. McDuffie	McDuffie Racing	Pontiac					
33		48	Tony Spanos	Hylton Motorsports	Chevrolet					
34		81	Mike Potter	Fillip Racing	Chevrolet					
Official race results

== Standings after the race ==
Drivers' Championship standings

	Pos	Driver	Points
	1	Dale Earnhardt	3,336
	2	Bill Elliott	2,791 (-545)
	3	Terry Labonte	2,717 (-619)
1	4	Rusty Wallace	2,655 (–681)
1	5	Neil Bonnett	2,641 (–695)
	6	Darrell Waltrip	2,584 (–752)
1	7	Ricky Rudd	2,567 (–769)
1	8	Kyle Petty	2,542 (–794)
1	9	Richard Petty	2,483 (–853)
1	10	Ken Schrader	2,428 (–908)
Official driver's standings

- Note: Only the first 10 positions are included for the driver standings.

Previous race: 1987 Champion Spark Plug 400	NASCAR Winston Cup Series; 1987 season	Next race: 1987 Southern 500
