= 1987 The Budweiser at The Glen =

18th race of 1987 NASCAR Winston Cup Series

Race details
- Race 18 of 29 in the 1987 NASCAR Winston Cup Series
- The 1987 The Budweiser at The Glen program cover.
- Date: August 10, 1987
- Official name: 2nd Annual The Budweiser at The Glen
- Location: Watkins Glen, New York, Watkins Glen International
- Course: Permanent racing facility
- Course length: 2.428 miles (3.907 km)
- Distance: 90 laps, 218.52 mi (351.673 km)
- Scheduled distance: 90 laps, 218.52 mi (351.673 km)
- Average speed: 90.682 miles per hour (145.939 km/h)
- Attendance: 35,000

Pole position
Driver	Terry Labonte	Junior Johnson & Associates
- Time: 1:14.102

Most laps led
Driver	Rusty Wallace	Blue Max Racing
- Laps: 63

Winner
No. 27	Rusty Wallace	Blue Max Racing

Television in the United States
- Network: ESPN
- Announcers: Bob Jenkins, Larry Nuber

Radio in the United States
- Radio: Motor Racing Network

The 1987 The Budweiser at The Glen was the 18th stock car race of the 1987 NASCAR Winston Cup Series season and the second iteration of the event. The race was originally scheduled to be held on Sunday, August 9, 1987, but was delayed until Monday, August 10, due to heavy rain. The race was held before an audience of 35,000 in Watkins Glen, New York, at the shortened layout of Watkins Glen International, a 2.428-mile (3.907 km) permanent road course layout.

By race's end, Blue Max Racing's Rusty Wallace, managing to retain the lead after a last-lap pit stop, dominated a majority of the race to take his third career NASCAR Winston Cup Series victory and his first victory of the season. To fill out the top three, Junior Johnson & Associates' Terry Labonte and owner-driver Dave Marcis finished second and third, respectively.

== Background ==
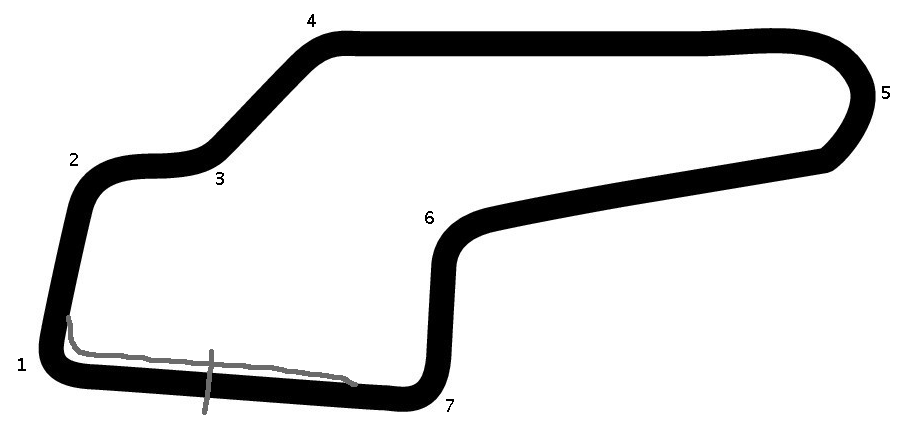
The layout of Watkins Glen International NASCAR used at the time.

Watkins Glen International (nicknamed "The Glen") is an automobile race track located in Watkins Glen, New York at the southern tip of Seneca Lake. It was long known around the world as the home of the Formula One United States Grand Prix, which it hosted for twenty consecutive years (1961–1980), but the site has been home to road racing of nearly every class, including the World Sportscar Championship, Trans-Am, Can-Am, NASCAR Sprint Cup Series, the International Motor Sports Association and the IndyCar Series.

Initially, public roads in the village were used for the race course. In 1956 a permanent circuit for the race was built. In 1968 the race was extended to six hours, becoming the 6 Hours of Watkins Glen. The circuit's current layout has more or less been the same since 1971, although a chicane was installed at the uphill Esses in 1975 to slow cars through these corners, where there was a fatality during practice at the 1973 United States Grand Prix. The chicane was removed in 1985, but another chicane called the "Inner Loop" was installed in 1992 after J. D. McDuffie's fatal accident during the previous year's NASCAR Winston Cup event.

The circuit is known as the Mecca of North American road racing and is a very popular venue among fans and drivers. The facility is currently owned by NASCAR.

=== Entry list ===
- (R) denotes rookie driver.

#	Driver	Team	Make
1	Chuck Schroedel	Gray Racing	Pontiac
3	Dale Earnhardt	Richard Childress Racing	Chevrolet
4	Rick Wilson	Morgan–McClure Motorsports	Oldsmobile
5	Geoff Bodine	Hendrick Motorsports	Chevrolet
6	Rick Knoop	U.S. Racing	Chevrolet
7	Alan Kulwicki	AK Racing	Ford
8	Bobby Hillin Jr.	Stavola Brothers Racing	Buick
9	Bill Elliott	Melling Racing	Ford
11	Terry Labonte	Junior Johnson & Associates	Chevrolet
12	Trevor Boys	Hamby Racing	Chevrolet
15	Ricky Rudd	Bud Moore Engineering	Ford
17	Darrell Waltrip	Hendrick Motorsports	Chevrolet
18	Dale Jarrett (R)	Freedlander Motorsports	Chevrolet
19	Derrike Cope (R)	Stoke Racing	Chevrolet
21	Kyle Petty	Wood Brothers Racing	Ford
22	Bobby Allison	Stavola Brothers Racing	Buick
25	Tim Richmond	Hendrick Motorsports	Chevrolet
26	Morgan Shepherd	King Racing	Buick
27	Rusty Wallace	Blue Max Racing	Pontiac
28	Davey Allison (R)	Ranier-Lundy Racing	Ford
30	Michael Waltrip	Bahari Racing	Chevrolet
33	Harry Gant	Mach 1 Racing	Chevrolet
35	Benny Parsons	Hendrick Motorsports	Chevrolet
43	Richard Petty	Petty Enterprises	Pontiac
44	Sterling Marlin	Hagan Racing	Oldsmobile
50	Greg Sacks (Note: Withdrew after a practice crash on Friday, August 7.)	Dingman Brothers Racing	Pontiac
51	Paul Newman (Note: Withdrew due to scheduling conflicts.)	Hendrick Motorsports	Chevrolet
52	Jimmy Means	Jimmy Means Racing	Pontiac
55	Phil Parsons	Jackson Bros. Motorsports	Oldsmobile
61	Mike Potter	Arrington Racing	Ford
62	Steve Christman (R)	Winkle Motorsports	Pontiac
63	Jocko Maggiacomo	Linro Motorsports	Chevrolet
64	Rodney Combs	Langley Racing	Ford
67	Buddy Arrington	Arrington Racing	Ford
70	J. D. McDuffie	McDuffie Racing	Pontiac
71	Dave Marcis	Marcis Auto Racing	Chevrolet
75	Neil Bonnett	RahMoc Enterprises	Pontiac
76	Phil Good	Good Racing	Ford
81	Tom Rotsell	Chilson Racing	Ford
88	Buddy Baker	Baker–Schiff Racing	Oldsmobile
89	Patty Moise	Reno Enterprises	Chevrolet
90	Ken Schrader	Donlavey Racing	Ford

== Qualifying ==
Qualifying was split into two rounds. The first round was held on Friday, August 7, at 1:00 PM EST. Each driver had one lap to set a time. During the first round, the top 20 drivers in the round were guaranteed a starting spot in the race. If a driver was not able to guarantee a spot in the first round, they had the option to scrub their time from the first round and try and run a faster lap time in a second round qualifying run, held on Saturday, August 8, at 11:00 AM EST. As with the first round, each driver had one lap to set a time. For this specific race, positions 21-40 were decided on time, and depending on who needed it, a select amount of positions were given to cars who had not otherwise qualified but were high enough in owner's points; up to two provisionals were given.

Terry Labonte, driving for Junior Johnson & Associates, managed to win the pole, setting a time of 1:14.102 and an average speed of 117.956 miles per hour (189.832 km/h) in the first round.

No drivers failed to qualify.

=== Full qualifying results ===
Pos.	#	Driver	Team	Make	Time	Speed
1	11	Terry Labonte	Junior Johnson & Associates	Chevrolet	1:14.102	117.956
2	27	Rusty Wallace	Blue Max Racing	Pontiac	1:14.251	117.720
3	5	Geoff Bodine	Hendrick Motorsports	Chevrolet	1:14.395	117.492
4	25	Tim Richmond	Hendrick Motorsports	Chevrolet	1:14.413	117.463
5	26	Morgan Shepherd	King Racing	Buick	1:14.599	117.170
6	55	Phil Parsons	Jackson Bros. Motorsports	Oldsmobile	1:14.636	117.112
7	15	Ricky Rudd	Bud Moore Engineering	Ford	1:14.687	117.032
8	17	Darrell Waltrip	Hendrick Motorsports	Chevrolet	1:14.764	116.912
9	9	Bill Elliott	Melling Racing	Ford	1:14.806	116.836
10	75	Neil Bonnett	RahMoc Enterprises	Pontiac	1:15.006	116.535
11	3	Dale Earnhardt	Richard Childress Racing	Chevrolet	1:15.119	116.359
12	30	Michael Waltrip	Bahari Racing	Chevrolet	1:15.356	115.993
13	44	Sterling Marlin	Hagan Racing	Oldsmobile	1:15.356	115.993
14	71	Dave Marcis	Marcis Auto Racing	Chevrolet	1:15.385	115.949
15	35	Benny Parsons	Hendrick Motorsports	Chevrolet	1:15.467	115.823
16	4	Rick Wilson	Morgan–McClure Motorsports	Oldsmobile	1:15.543	115.706
17	8	Bobby Hillin Jr.	Stavola Brothers Racing	Buick	1:15.636	115.456
18	33	Harry Gant	Mach 1 Racing	Chevrolet	1:15.709	115.453
19	7	Alan Kulwicki	AK Racing	Ford	1:15.741	115.404
20	18	Dale Jarrett (R)	Freedlander Motorsports	Chevrolet	1:16.025	114.973
Failed to lock in Round 1
21	22	Bobby Allison	Stavola Brothers Racing	Buick	1:15.234	116.182
22	43	Richard Petty	Petty Enterprises	Pontiac	1:16.096	114.865
23	90	Ken Schrader	Donlavey Racing	Ford	1:16.185	114.731
24	21	Kyle Petty	Wood Brothers Racing	Ford	1:16.357	114.473
25	19	Derrike Cope (R)	Stoke Racing	Chevrolet	1:16.502	114.256
26	63	Jocko Maggiacomo	Linro Motorsports	Chevrolet	1:17.114	113.349
27	88	Buddy Baker	Baker–Schiff Racing	Oldsmobile	1:17.978	112.093
28	62	Steve Christman (R)	Winkle Motorsports	Pontiac	1:18.582	111.232
29	52	Jimmy Means	Jimmy Means Racing	Pontiac	1:18.596	111.212
30	89	Patty Moise	Reno Enterprises	Chevrolet	1:18.839	110.869
31	70	J. D. McDuffie	McDuffie Racing	Pontiac	1:19.082	110.528
32	12	Trevor Boys	Hamby Racing	Chevrolet	1:19.130	110.461
33	28	Davey Allison (R)	Ranier-Lundy Racing	Ford	1:19.142	110.445
34	6	Rick Knoop	U.S. Racing	Chevrolet	1:19.403	110.081
35	81	Tom Rotsell	Chilson Racing	Ford	1:20.073	109.160
36	64	Rodney Combs	Langley Racing	Ford	1:20.324	108.819
37	67	Buddy Arrington	Arrington Racing	Ford	1:20.571	108.486
38	76	Phil Good	Good Racing	Ford	1:21.258	107.568
39	61	Mike Potter	Arrington Racing	Ford	1:22.515	105.930
40	1	Chuck Schroedel	Gray Racing	Pontiac	1:23.750	104.368
Withdrew
WD	50	Greg Sacks	Dingman Brothers Racing	Pontiac	-	-
WD	51	Paul Newman	Hendrick Motorsports	Chevrolet	-	-
Official first round qualifying results
Official starting lineup

== Race results ==
Fin	St	#	Driver	Team	Make	Laps	Led	Status	Pts	Winnings
1	2	27	Rusty Wallace	Blue Max Racing	Pontiac	90	63	running	185	$52,925
2	1	11	Terry Labonte	Junior Johnson & Associates	Chevrolet	90	0	running	170	$35,850
3	14	71	Dave Marcis	Marcis Auto Racing	Chevrolet	90	0	running	165	$23,880
4	7	15	Ricky Rudd	Bud Moore Engineering	Ford	90	0	running	160	$20,135
5	15	35	Benny Parsons	Hendrick Motorsports	Chevrolet	90	0	running	155	$19,655
6	19	7	Alan Kulwicki	AK Racing	Ford	90	0	running	150	$13,875
7	6	55	Phil Parsons	Jackson Bros. Motorsports	Oldsmobile	90	0	running	146	$6,120
8	11	3	Dale Earnhardt	Richard Childress Racing	Chevrolet	90	6	running	147	$17,005
9	21	22	Bobby Allison	Stavola Brothers Racing	Buick	90	0	running	138	$12,540
10	4	25	Tim Richmond	Hendrick Motorsports	Chevrolet	90	7	running	139	$5,960
11	8	17	Darrell Waltrip	Hendrick Motorsports	Chevrolet	90	0	running	130	$4,180
12	24	21	Kyle Petty	Wood Brothers Racing	Ford	90	0	running	127	$11,945
13	27	88	Buddy Baker	Baker–Schiff Racing	Oldsmobile	90	0	running	124	$3,715
14	22	43	Richard Petty	Petty Enterprises	Pontiac	90	0	running	121	$7,655
15	3	5	Geoff Bodine	Hendrick Motorsports	Chevrolet	90	10	running	123	$11,305
16	12	30	Michael Waltrip	Bahari Racing	Chevrolet	89	0	running	115	$8,205
17	33	28	Davey Allison (R)	Ranier-Lundy Racing	Ford	88	0	running	112	$3,775
18	18	33	Harry Gant	Mach 1 Racing	Chevrolet	88	0	running	109	$6,870
19	29	52	Jimmy Means	Jimmy Means Racing	Pontiac	88	0	running	106	$6,585
20	37	67	Buddy Arrington	Arrington Racing	Ford	88	0	running	103	$6,865
21	16	4	Rick Wilson	Morgan–McClure Motorsports	Oldsmobile	88	0	running	100	$2,505
22	5	26	Morgan Shepherd	King Racing	Buick	88	0	running	97	$5,810
23	36	64	Rodney Combs	Langley Racing	Ford	87	0	running	0	$5,490
24	31	70	J. D. McDuffie	McDuffie Racing	Pontiac	87	0	running	91	$2,225
25	34	6	Rick Knoop	U.S. Racing	Chevrolet	86	0	running	0	$5,310
26	35	81	Tom Rotsell	Chilson Racing	Ford	84	0	running	85	$2,110
27	23	90	Ken Schrader	Donlavey Racing	Ford	83	0	running	82	$4,830
28	9	9	Bill Elliott	Melling Racing	Ford	77	0	running	79	$10,600
29	17	8	Bobby Hillin Jr.	Stavola Brothers Racing	Buick	75	0	running	76	$9,695
30	39	61	Mike Potter	Arrington Racing	Ford	74	0	running	73	$1,890
31	25	19	Derrike Cope (R)	Stoke Racing	Chevrolet	65	0	transmission	70	$1,835
32	13	44	Sterling Marlin	Hagan Racing	Oldsmobile	64	0	running	67	$4,515
33	30	89	Patty Moise	Reno Enterprises	Chevrolet	53	0	crash	64	$1,690
34	28	62	Steve Christman (R)	Winkle Motorsports	Pontiac	52	0	crash	61	$1,635
35	26	63	Jocko Maggiacomo	Linro Motorsports	Chevrolet	51	0	engine	58	$1,580
36	20	18	Dale Jarrett (R)	Freedlander Motorsports	Chevrolet	42	0	transmission	55	$4,280
37	10	75	Neil Bonnett	RahMoc Enterprises	Pontiac	24	4	engine	57	$4,230
38	32	12	Trevor Boys	Hamby Racing	Chevrolet	17	0	engine	0	$3,465
39	38	76	Phil Good	Good Racing	Ford	10	0	transmission	46	$1,435
40	40	1	Chuck Schroedel	Gray Racing	Pontiac	8	0	engine	43	$1,375
Withdrew
WD		50	Greg Sacks	Dingman Brothers Racing	Pontiac					
WD		51	Paul Newman	Hendrick Motorsports	Chevrolet					
Official race results

== Standings after the race ==
Drivers' Championship standings

	Pos	Driver	Points
	1	Dale Earnhardt	2,971
1	2	Terry Labonte	2,488 (–483)
1	3	Bill Elliott	2,473 (–498)
1	4	Kyle Petty	2,381 (–590)
1	5	Neil Bonnett	2,369 (–602)
	6	Darrell Waltrip	2,362 (–609)
2	7	Rusty Wallace	2,315 (–656)
	8	Ricky Rudd	2,314 (–657)
2	9	Ken Schrader	2,280 (–691)
	10	Richard Petty	2,188 (–783)
Official driver's standings

- Note: Only the first 10 positions are included for the driver standings.

== Notes ==
Previous race: 1987 Talladega 500	NASCAR Winston Cup Series; 1987 season	Next race: 1987 Champion Spark Plug 400
