= 1987 Champion Spark Plug 400 =

19th race of the 1987 NASCAR Winston Cup Series

Race details
- Race 19 of 29 in the 1987 NASCAR Winston Cup Series
- The 1987 Champion Spark Plug 400 program cover.
- Date: August 16, 1987
- Official name: 18th Annual Champion Spark Plug 400
- Location: Brooklyn, Michigan, Michigan International Speedway
- Course: Permanent racing facility
- Course length: 2 miles (3.2 km)
- Distance: 200 laps, 400 mi (643.737 km)
- Scheduled distance: 200 laps, 400 mi (643.737 km)
- Average speed: 138.648 miles per hour (223.132 km/h)
- Attendance: 72,000

Pole position
Driver	Davey Allison	Ranier-Lundy Racing
- Time: 42.178

Most laps led
Driver	Dale Earnhardt	Richard Childress Racing
- Laps: 63

Winner
No. 9	Bill Elliott	Melling Racing

Television in the United States
- Network: ESPN
- Announcers: Bob Jenkins, Larry Nuber

Radio in the United States
- Radio: Motor Racing Network

The 1987 Champion Spark Plug 400 was the 19th stock car race of the 1987 NASCAR Winston Cup Series season and the 18th iteration of the event. The race was held on Sunday, August 16, 1987, before an audience of 72,000 in Brooklyn, Michigan, at Michigan International Speedway, a two-mile (3.2 km) moderate-banked D-shaped speedway. The race took the scheduled 200 laps to complete.

In the final laps of the race, Melling Racing's Bill Elliott was able to hold off a late-race charges by Richard Petty and Dale Earnhardt, holding off the field on the final restart with eight laps left to take his 20th career NASCAR Winston Cup Series victory and his third victory of the season. To fill out the top three, the aforementioned Dale Earnhardt and King Racing's Morgan Shepherd finished second and third, respectively.

== Background ==
The layout of Michigan International Speedway, the venue where the race was held.

The race was held at Michigan International Speedway, a two-mile (3.2 km) moderate-banked D-shaped speedway located in Brooklyn, Michigan. The track is used primarily for NASCAR events. It is known as a "sister track" to Texas World Speedway as MIS's oval design was a direct basis of TWS, with moderate modifications to the banking in the corners, and was used as the basis of Auto Club Speedway. The track is owned by International Speedway Corporation. Michigan International Speedway is recognized as one of motorsports' premier facilities because of its wide racing surface and high banking (by open-wheel standards; the 18-degree banking is modest by stock car standards).

=== Entry list ===
- (R) denotes rookie driver.

#	Driver	Team	Make	Sponsor
1	Brett Bodine	Ellington Racing	Chevrolet	Bull's-Eye Barbecue Sauce
01	Dave Pletcher Sr.	Weaver Racing	Ford	Ernie Haire Ford
3	Dale Earnhardt	Richard Childress Racing	Chevrolet	Wrangler
4	Rick Wilson	Morgan–McClure Motorsports	Oldsmobile	Kodak
04	Charlie Rudolph	Rudolph Racing	Chevrolet	Sunoco
5	Geoff Bodine	Hendrick Motorsports	Chevrolet	Levi Garrett
6	Connie Saylor	U.S. Racing	Chevrolet	U.S. Racing
7	Alan Kulwicki	AK Racing	Ford	Zerex
8	Bobby Hillin Jr.	Stavola Brothers Racing	Buick	Miller American
9	Bill Elliott	Melling Racing	Ford	Coors
11	Terry Labonte	Junior Johnson & Associates	Chevrolet	Budweiser
12	Trevor Boys	Hamby Racing	Chevrolet	Gorman's Esso Sales
15	Ricky Rudd	Bud Moore Engineering	Ford	Motorcraft Quality Parts
17	Darrell Waltrip	Hendrick Motorsports	Chevrolet	Tide
18	Dale Jarrett (R)	Freedlander Motorsports	Chevrolet	Freedlander Financial
19	Derrike Cope (R)	Stoke Racing	Ford	Stoke Racing
21	Kyle Petty	Wood Brothers Racing	Ford	Citgo
22	Bobby Allison	Stavola Brothers Racing	Buick	Miller American
25	Tim Richmond	Hendrick Motorsports	Chevrolet	Folgers
26	Morgan Shepherd	King Racing	Buick	Quaker State
27	Rusty Wallace	Blue Max Racing	Pontiac	Kodiak
28	Davey Allison (R)	Ranier-Lundy Racing	Ford	Texaco, Havoline
29	Cale Yarborough	Cale Yarborough Motorsports	Oldsmobile	Hardee's
30	Michael Waltrip	Bahari Racing	Chevrolet	All Pro Auto Parts
33	Harry Gant	Mach 1 Racing	Chevrolet	Skoal Bandit
35	Benny Parsons	Hendrick Motorsports	Chevrolet	Folgers Decaf
36	H. B. Bailey	Bailey Racing	Pontiac	Almeda Auto Parts
38	Rickey Hood	Hood Racing	Ford	Solar Sources
43	Richard Petty	Petty Enterprises	Pontiac	STP
44	Sterling Marlin	Hagan Racing	Oldsmobile	Piedmont Airlines
50	Greg Sacks	Dingman Brothers Racing	Pontiac	Valvoline
51	David Simko	Simko Racing	Chevrolet	Metro 25 Car Care Center
52	Jimmy Means	Jimmy Means Racing	Pontiac	Eureka
55	Phil Parsons	Jackson Bros. Motorsports	Oldsmobile	Skoal Classic
62	Steve Christman (R)	Winkle Motorsports	Pontiac	AC Spark Plug
63	Jocko Maggiacomo	Linro Motorsports	Chevrolet	Linro Motorsports
64	Rodney Combs	Langley Racing	Ford	Sunny King Ford
67	Buddy Arrington	Arrington Racing	Ford	Pannill Sweatshirts
69	Donny Paul	Paul Racing	Chevrolet	Cyclo Automotive Chemicals
70	J. D. McDuffie	McDuffie Racing	Pontiac	Rumple Furniture
71	Dave Marcis	Marcis Auto Racing	Chevrolet	Lifebuoy
74	Bobby Wawak	Wawak Racing	Chevrolet	Wawak Racing
75	Neil Bonnett	RahMoc Enterprises	Pontiac	Valvoline
77	Ken Ragan	Ragan Racing	Ford	Southlake Ford
80	Eddie Bierschwale	S&H Racing	Chevrolet	TRW Automotive
82	Rick Jeffrey	Jeffrey Racing	Chevrolet	Jeffrey Racing
83	Lake Speed	Speed Racing	Oldsmobile	Wynn's, Kmart
88	Buddy Baker	Baker–Schiff Racing	Oldsmobile	Crisco
89	Jim Sauter	Mueller Brothers Racing	Pontiac	Evinrude Outboard Motors
90	Ken Schrader	Donlavey Racing	Ford	Red Baron Frozen Pizza

== Qualifying ==
Qualifying was split into two rounds. The first round was held on Saturday, August 15, at 11:30 AM EST. Each driver had one lap to set a time. During the first round, the top 20 drivers in the round were guaranteed a starting spot in the race. If a driver was not able to guarantee a spot in the first round, they had the option to scrub their time from the first round and try and run a faster lap time in a second round qualifying run, held on Saturday, at 2:00 PM EST. As with the first round, each driver had one lap to set a time. For this specific race, positions 21-40 were decided on time, and depending on who needed it, a select amount of positions were given to cars who had not otherwise qualified but were high enough in owner's points; up to two provisionals were given.

Davey Allison, driving for Ranier-Lundy Racing, managed to win the pole, setting a time of 42.178 and an average speed of 170.705 miles per hour (274.723 km/h) in the first round.

Ten drivers failed to qualify. Two drivers who failed to qualify, Jocko Maggiacomo and Donny Paul, were both involved in qualifying crashes.

=== Full qualifying results ===
Pos.	#	Driver	Team	Make	Time	Speed
1	28	Davey Allison (R)	Ranier-Lundy Racing	Ford	42.178	170.705
2	7	Alan Kulwicki	AK Racing	Ford	42.236	170.471
3	9	Bill Elliott	Melling Racing	Ford	42.370	169.932
4	90	Ken Schrader	Donlavey Racing	Ford	42.488	169.460
5	1	Brett Bodine	Ellington Racing	Chevrolet	42.494	169.436
6	35	Benny Parsons	Hendrick Motorsports	Chevrolet	42.606	168.990
7	17	Darrell Waltrip	Hendrick Motorsports	Chevrolet	42.618	168.943
8	3	Dale Earnhardt	Richard Childress Racing	Chevrolet	42.684	168.681
9	11	Terry Labonte	Junior Johnson & Associates	Chevrolet	42.694	168.642
10	19	Derrike Cope (R)	Stoke Racing	Ford	42.696	168.634
11	43	Richard Petty	Petty Enterprises	Pontiac	42.746	168.437
12	33	Harry Gant	Mach 1 Racing	Chevrolet	42.754	168.405
13	4	Rick Wilson	Morgan–McClure Motorsports	Oldsmobile	42.796	168.240
14	83	Lake Speed	Speed Racing	Oldsmobile	42.826	168.122
15	26	Morgan Shepherd	King Racing	Buick	42.878	167.918
16	8	Bobby Hillin Jr.	Stavola Brothers Racing	Buick	42.887	167.883
17	89	Jim Sauter	Mueller Brothers Racing	Pontiac	42.903	167.820
18	21	Kyle Petty	Wood Brothers Racing	Ford	42.903	167.820
19	22	Bobby Allison	Stavola Brothers Racing	Buick	42.913	167.781
20	27	Rusty Wallace	Blue Max Racing	Pontiac	42.921	167.750
Failed to lock in Round 1
21	44	Sterling Marlin	Hagan Racing	Oldsmobile	42.878	167.918
22	5	Geoff Bodine	Hendrick Motorsports	Chevrolet	42.929	167.719
23	55	Phil Parsons	Jackson Bros. Motorsports	Oldsmobile	42.940	167.676
24	64	Rodney Combs	Langley Racing	Ford	42.942	167.668
25	25	Tim Richmond	Hendrick Motorsports	Chevrolet	42.948	167.645
26	77	Ken Ragan	Ragan Racing	Ford	42.963	167.586
27	15	Ricky Rudd	Bud Moore Engineering	Ford	43.062	167.201
28	30	Michael Waltrip	Bahari Racing	Chevrolet	43.073	167.158
29	71	Dave Marcis	Marcis Auto Racing	Chevrolet	43.085	167.112
30	75	Neil Bonnett	RahMoc Enterprises	Pontiac	43.106	167.030
31	88	Buddy Baker	Baker-Schiff Racing	Oldsmobile	43.188	166.713
32	29	Cale Yarborough	Cale Yarborough Motorsports	Oldsmobile	43.221	166.586
33	67	Buddy Arrington	Arrington Racing	Ford	43.354	166.075
34	51	David Simko	Simko Racing	Chevrolet	43.410	165.850
35	70	J. D. McDuffie	McDuffie Racing	Pontiac	43.427	165.795
36	52	Jimmy Means	Jimmy Means Racing	Chevrolet	43.510	165.479
37	18	Dale Jarrett (R)	Freedlander Motorsports	Chevrolet	43.512	165.472
38	04	Charlie Rudolph	Rudolph Racing	Chevrolet	43.547	165.339
39	74	Bobby Wawak	Wawak Racing	Chevrolet	43.645	164.967
40	50	Greg Sacks	Dingman Brothers Racing	Pontiac	43.676	164.850
Failed to qualify (results unknown)
41	01	Dave Pletcher Sr.	Weaver Racing	Ford	-*	-*
42	6	Connie Saylor	U.S. Racing	Chevrolet	-*	-*
43	12	Trevor Boys	Hamby Racing	Oldsmobile	-*	-*
44	36	H. B. Bailey	Bailey Racing	Pontiac	-*	-*
45	38	Rickey Hood	Hood Racing	Ford	-*	-*
46	62	Steve Christman (R)	Winkle Motorsports	Pontiac	-*	-*
47	80	Eddie Bierschwale	S&H Racing	Chevrolet	-*	-*
48	82	Rick Jeffrey	Jeffrey Racing	Chevrolet	-*	-*
49	63	Jocko Maggiacomo	Linro Motorsports	Chevrolet	-	-
50	69	Donny Paul	Paul Racing	Chevrolet	-	-
Official starting lineup

== Race results ==
Fin	St	#	Driver	Team	Make	Laps	Led	Status	Pts	Winnings
1	3	9	Bill Elliott	Melling Racing	Ford	200	16	running	180	$52,875
2	8	3	Dale Earnhardt	Richard Childress Racing	Chevrolet	200	63	running	180	$34,325
3	15	26	Morgan Shepherd	King Racing	Buick	200	1	running	170	$20,505
4	20	27	Rusty Wallace	Blue Max Racing	Pontiac	200	58	running	165	$20,650
5	1	28	Davey Allison (R)	Ranier-Lundy Racing	Ford	200	21	running	160	$13,500
6	2	7	Alan Kulwicki	AK Racing	Ford	200	0	running	150	$15,795
7	19	22	Bobby Allison	Stavola Brothers Racing	Buick	200	11	running	151	$14,290
8	31	88	Buddy Baker	Baker-Schiff Racing	Oldsmobile	200	0	running	142	$8,295
9	30	75	Neil Bonnett	RahMoc Enterprises	Pontiac	200	0	running	138	$10,310
10	22	5	Geoff Bodine	Hendrick Motorsports	Chevrolet	200	1	running	139	$13,955
11	11	43	Richard Petty	Petty Enterprises	Pontiac	199	28	crash	135	$9,990
12	13	4	Rick Wilson	Morgan–McClure Motorsports	Oldsmobile	199	0	running	127	$4,845
13	16	8	Bobby Hillin Jr.	Stavola Brothers Racing	Buick	199	0	running	124	$11,515
14	23	55	Phil Parsons	Jackson Bros. Motorsports	Oldsmobile	199	0	running	121	$4,185
15	21	44	Sterling Marlin	Hagan Racing	Oldsmobile	199	0	running	118	$8,665
16	14	83	Lake Speed	Speed Racing	Oldsmobile	199	0	running	115	$3,645
17	7	17	Darrell Waltrip	Hendrick Motorsports	Chevrolet	199	1	running	117	$5,270
18	6	35	Benny Parsons	Hendrick Motorsports	Chevrolet	199	0	running	109	$12,425
19	40	50	Greg Sacks	Dingman Brothers Racing	Pontiac	198	0	running	106	$3,015
20	28	30	Michael Waltrip	Bahari Racing	Chevrolet	198	0	running	103	$7,030
21	5	1	Brett Bodine	Ellington Racing	Chevrolet	196	0	running	100	$3,420
22	35	70	J. D. McDuffie	McDuffie Racing	Pontiac	195	0	running	97	$2,560
23	33	67	Buddy Arrington	Arrington Racing	Ford	194	0	running	94	$5,865
24	17	89	Jim Sauter	Mueller Brothers Racing	Pontiac	190	0	engine	91	$2,840
25	27	15	Ricky Rudd	Bud Moore Engineering	Ford	180	0	running	88	$11,485
26	12	33	Harry Gant	Mach 1 Racing	Chevrolet	179	0	engine	85	$5,360
27	18	21	Kyle Petty	Wood Brothers Racing	Ford	165	0	engine	82	$9,100
28	34	51	David Simko	Simko Racing	Chevrolet	164	0	engine	79	$2,045
29	25	25	Tim Richmond	Hendrick Motorsports	Chevrolet	149	0	engine	76	$1,990
30	26	77	Ken Ragan	Ragan Racing	Ford	146	0	crash	73	$1,930
31	24	64	Rodney Combs	Langley Racing	Ford	146	0	engine	70	$4,935
32	39	74	Bobby Wawak	Wawak Racing	Chevrolet	137	0	oil leak	67	$1,845
33	9	11	Terry Labonte	Junior Johnson & Associates	Chevrolet	129	0	water pump	64	$10,600
34	4	90	Ken Schrader	Donlavey Racing	Ford	89	0	engine	61	$4,630
35	29	71	Dave Marcis	Marcis Auto Racing	Chevrolet	77	0	engine	58	$4,465
36	38	04	Charlie Rudolph	Rudolph Racing	Chevrolet	68	0	transmission	55	$1,680
37	36	52	Jimmy Means	Jimmy Means Racing	Chevrolet	65	0	engine	52	$4,430
38	10	19	Derrike Cope (R)	Stoke Racing	Ford	43	0	engine	49	$1,670
39	37	18	Dale Jarrett (R)	Freedlander Motorsports	Chevrolet	25	0	engine	46	$4,400
40	32	29	Cale Yarborough	Cale Yarborough Motorsports	Oldsmobile	22	0	engine	43	$1,660
Failed to qualify (results unknown)
41		01	Dave Pletcher Sr.	Weaver Racing	Ford					
42		6	Connie Saylor	U.S. Racing	Chevrolet					
43		12	Trevor Boys	Hamby Racing	Oldsmobile					
44		36	H. B. Bailey	Bailey Racing	Pontiac					
45		38	Rickey Hood	Hood Racing	Ford					
46		62	Steve Christman (R)	Winkle Motorsports	Pontiac					
47		80	Eddie Bierschwale	S&H Racing	Chevrolet					
48		82	Rick Jeffrey	Jeffrey Racing	Chevrolet					
49		63	Jocko Maggiacomo	Linro Motorsports	Chevrolet					
50		69	Donny Paul	Paul Racing	Chevrolet					
Official race results

== Standings after the race ==
Drivers' Championship standings

	Pos	Driver	Points
	1	Dale Earnhardt	3,151
1	2	Bill Elliott	2,653 (-498)
1	3	Terry Labonte	2,552 (-599)
1	4	Neil Bonnett	2,507 (–644)
2	5	Rusty Wallace	2,480 (–671)
	6	Darrell Waltrip	2,479 (–672)
3	7	Kyle Petty	2,463 (–688)
	8	Ricky Rudd	2,402 (–749)
	9	Ken Schrader	2,341 (–810)
	10	Richard Petty	2,323 (–828)
Official driver's standings

- Note: Only the first 10 positions are included for the driver standings.

Previous race: 1987 The Budweiser at The Glen	NASCAR Winston Cup Series; 1987 season	Next race: 1987 Busch 500
