= Ricky Rudd =

American racing driver (born 1956)

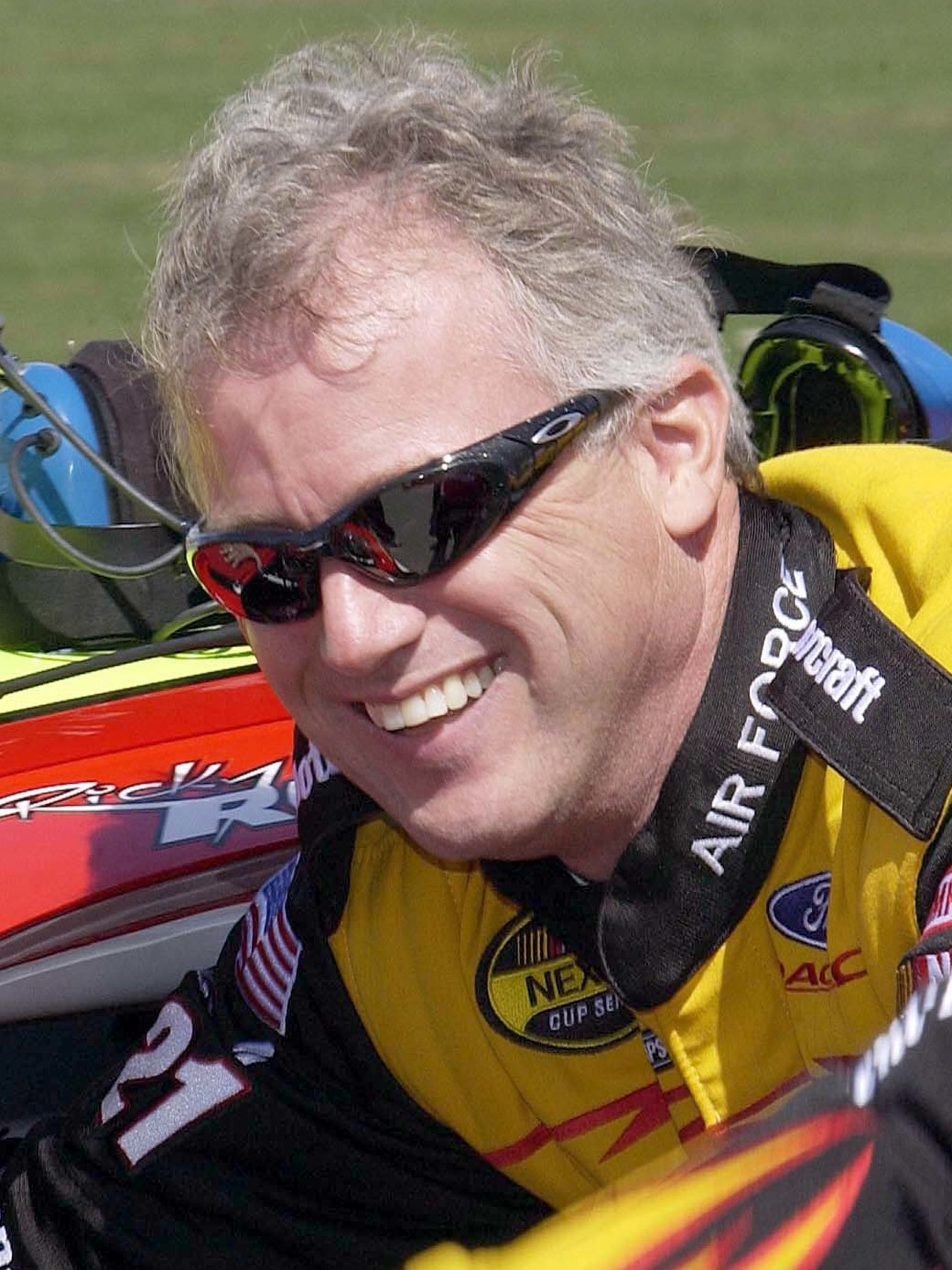
- Rudd at Daytona International Speedway in 2004
- Born: Richard Lee Rudd; September 12, 1956 (age 70); South Norfolk, Virginia, U.S.
- Achievements: 1992 IROC Champion; 1997 Brickyard 400 Winner; 2006 Dan Wheldon Cup (Robo-Pong 200) winner Most career starts in NASCAR Cup Series modern era (906)
- Awards: 1977 Winston Cup Series Rookie of the Year; Named one of NASCAR's 50 Greatest Drivers (1998); 2006 Virginian of the Year; Virginia Sports Hall of Fame (2007); Hampton Roads Sports Hall of Fame (2010); Named one of NASCAR's 75 Greatest Drivers (2023); NASCAR Hall of Fame (2025)

NASCAR Cup Series career
- 906 races run over 32 years
- Best finish: 2nd (1991)
- First race: 1975 Carolina 500 (Rockingham)
- Last race: 2007 Ford 400 (Homestead)
- First win: 1983 Budweiser 400 (Riverside)
- Last win: 2002 Dodge/Save Mart 350 (Sonoma)
Wins	Top tens	Poles
23	374	29

NASCAR O'Reilly Auto Parts Series career
- 3 races run over 1 year
- Best finish: 65th (1983)
- First race: 1983 Sportsman 200 (Dover)
- Last race: 1983 Miller Time 300 (Charlotte)
- First win: 1983 Sportsman 200 (Dover)
Wins	Top tens	Poles
1	1	0
- Statistics up to date as of February 16, 2015.

Richard Lee Rudd (born September 12, 1956), nicknamed "the Rooster", is an American former racing driver and racing team owner. He is the uncle of actor Skeet Ulrich and former NASCAR Busch Series driver Jason Rudd. He retired in 2007 with 23 career wins; twenty were done in a span from 1983 to 1998, where he won at least one race in sixteen consecutive seasons, a mark only surpassed by three other drivers. He was named the 2006 Virginian of the Year and was inducted into the Virginia Sports Hall of Fame in 2007. In October 2010, he was selected to the Hampton Roads Sports Hall of Fame, which honors those who have contributed to sports in southeastern Virginia.

== Career ==
=== Early life ===
Rudd was born in South Norfolk, Virginia (now Chesapeake), the son of Margaret (née McMannen) and Alvin R. Rudd Sr., the president of Al Rudd Auto Parts. He began racing as a teenager in karting and motocross, but did not attempt stock car racing until he was eighteen years old, when he made his NASCAR debut at Rockingham in 1975, driving the No. 10 Ford for family friend Bill Champion.

Qualifying 26th, Rudd finished in 11th place despite running 46 laps down. He then ran an additional three races for Champion, his best finish being a tenth at Bristol. He drove another four races in 1976 for his father, posting another tenth-place finish at the Firecracker 400. He went full-time in 1977, again driving the No. 22 for his father. He had ten top-ten finishes and was named Rookie of the Year. Rudd ran part-time the following season. Despite the abbreviated schedule, he earned four top-tens and finished 31st in points. In 1979, he signed with Junie Donlavey to pilot the No. 90 Truxmore car, garnering four top-fives and a ninth-place finish in the final points standings.

Rudd did not return to Donlavey in 1980, and started out in a part-time run for his dad and D. K. Ulrich. He finished the season in the No. 7 Sanyo car for Nelson Malloch, for whom he had one tenth-place finish.

=== 1981–1987 ===
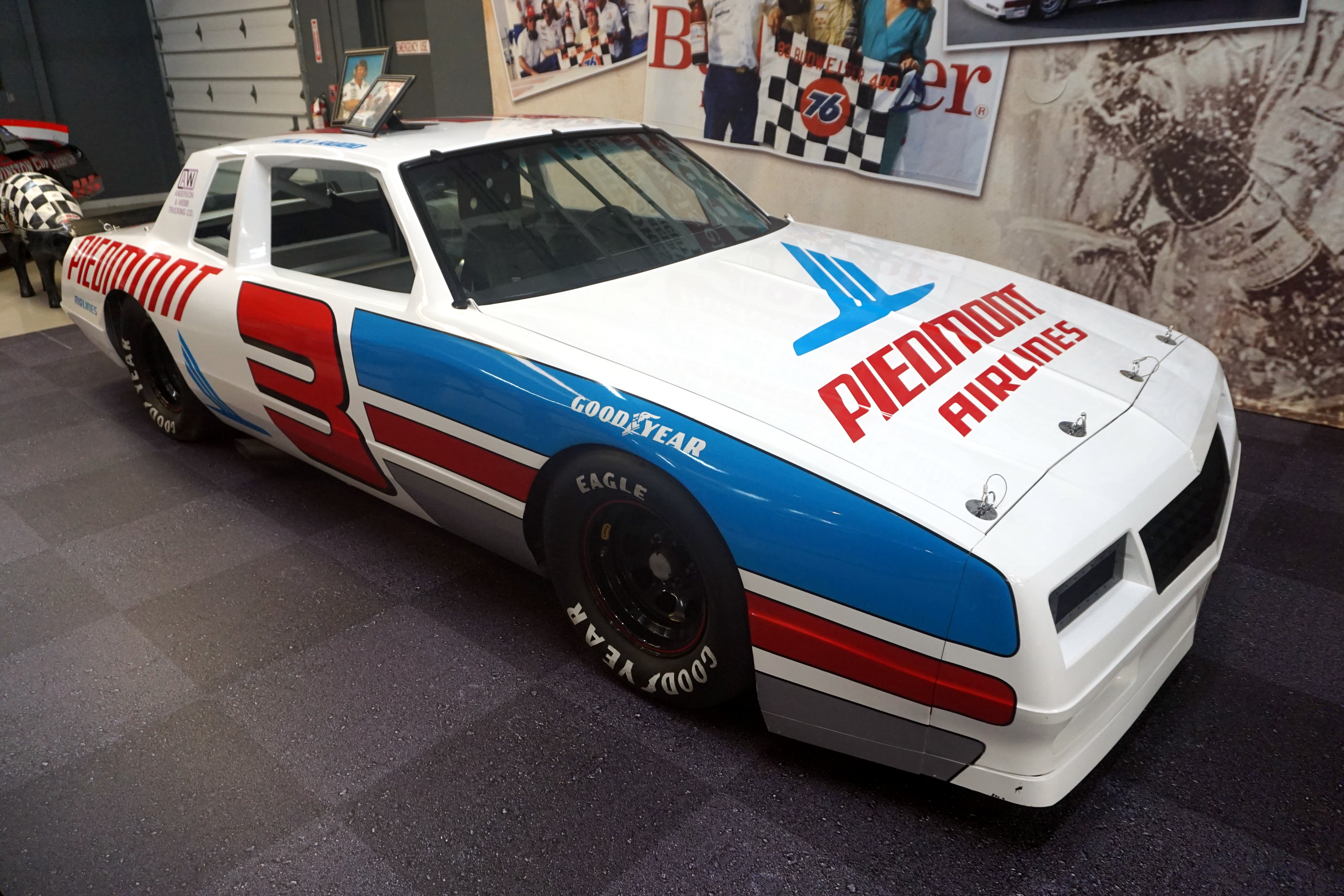
Ricky Rudd's 1983 Riverside International Raceway-winning No. 3 Piedmont Airlines Chevrolet Monte Carlo

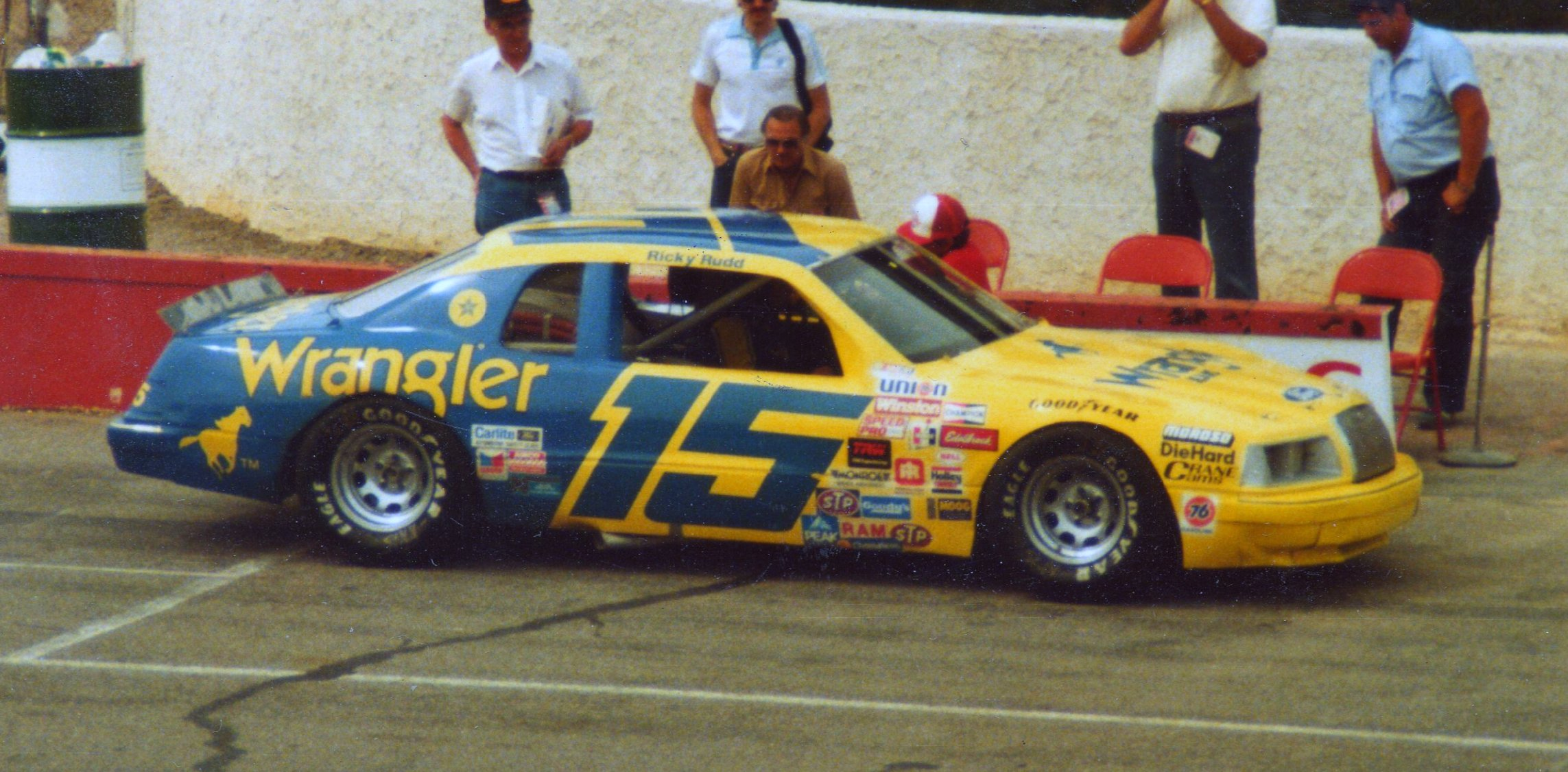
Rudd in 1984

In 1981, Rudd signed with DiGard Motorsports to drive the No. 88 car. Although he had no victories, he won his first three pole positions, and began his lengthy streak of consecutive race starts. In 1982, Rudd stepped into the No. 3 Pontiac for Richard Childress Racing. Rudd had six top-fives but dropped down to ninth in the points standings. In the 1983 Daytona 500, Rudd became the youngest pole winner in Daytona 500 history at the age of 26 and would hold that record until 2014 when it was broken by a 23-year-old Austin Dillon. He was able to get his first two career wins in 1983 at Riverside and Martinsville respectively, but he again finished ninth in points. He also ran the only three Busch Series races of his career that season, winning in his debut event at Dover Downs.

In 1984, Rudd and Dale Earnhardt swapped rides, with Rudd moving over to the No. 15 Ford for Bud Moore. The move came after Earnhardt signed with Childress, leaving Rudd disappointed and out of a ride until he drove for Moore. Rudd was involved in a horrific crash in the Busch Clash at Daytona, in which his car went airborne (in a crash that Ned Jarrett described as something like a "bucking horse") before suffering a concussion and a torn cartilage in his rib cage. His eyes were swollen so badly he taped his eyes open to be able to race in the Daytona 500, as well as a flak jacket for his rib injury. After learning of this long after the fact, NASCAR instituted the policy of examining all drivers involved in wrecks to ensure that they will be able to race safely the next week. He won his first race for this team in only his second start at Richmond and improved to seventh in points. He moved up one spot in points in the following season, and then a career-best fifth-place finish in 1986. Despite an additional two victories in 1987, Rudd left Moore Engineering at the end of the season.

=== 1988–1993 ===
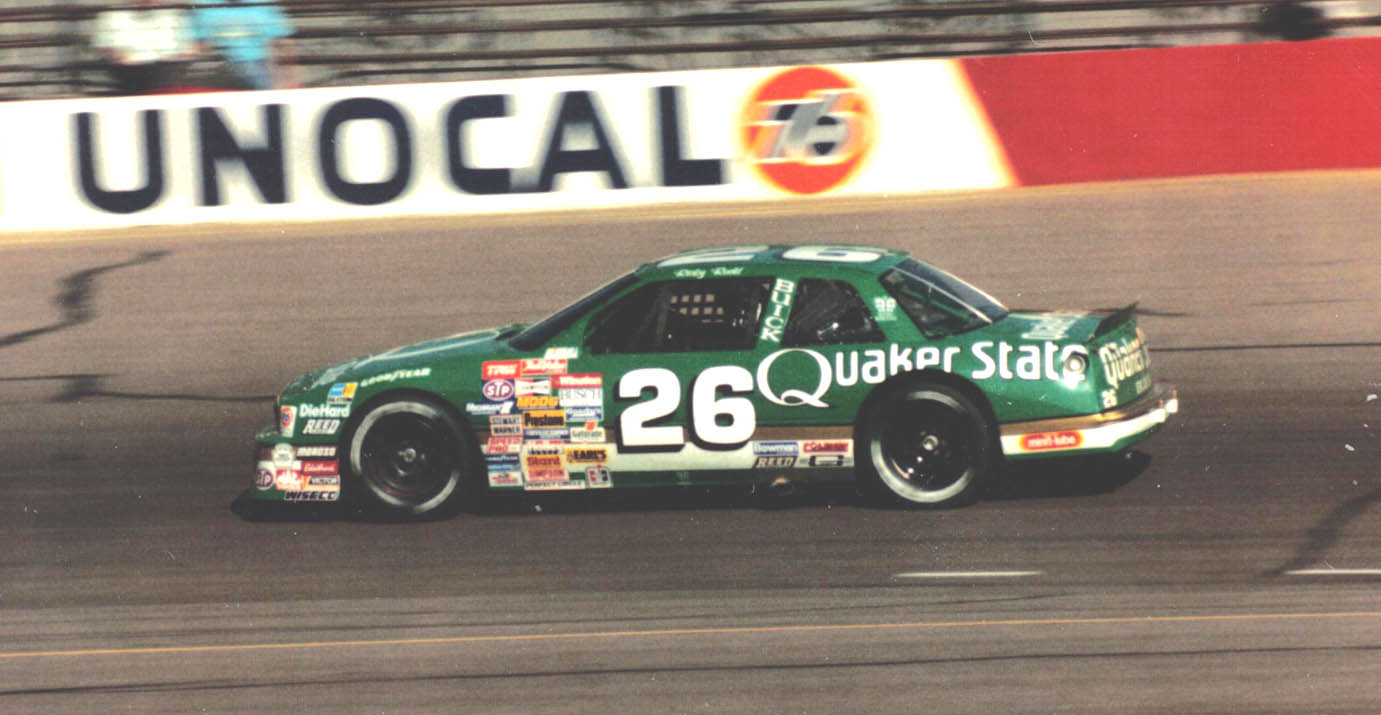
1989 No. 26 Buick Regal

Rudd joined King Racing beginning in 1988 in the No. 26 Buick Regal owned by drag racing legend Kenny Bernstein. He struggled with engine failures all season long and finished 11th in the point standings, his worst points finish in eight years. In addition, Rudd suffered a knee injury in a crash at The Winston. At North Wilkesboro, Rudd was fined $10,000 for actions detrimental to stock car racing after spinning Dale Earnhardt late in the race. After his only win of 1989, which came at the inaugural Sears Point event, Rudd departed the operation. He tangled with Earnhardt again at North Wilkesboro, as a last-lap altercation while fighting for the lead handed the win to Geoff Bodine. In 1990, Rudd signed with Hendrick Motorsports to drive the No. 5 Chevrolet Lumina. He was able to win Watkins Glen and finished seventh in points. However, he was involved in a fatal pit road accident in the season-finale at Atlanta, in which he spun into Bill Elliott's pit and accidentally crushed Elliott's tire changer Mike Rich, who died hours later in surgery. That fatal incident caused NASCAR to implement pit road speed limits at every NASCAR track, for all of the series.

In 1991, Rudd won his only race of the year at Darlington. Later in the year at Sonoma, Rudd was the center of controversy in one of the most bizarre finishes in NASCAR. Rudd started on pole at the race, and was offered a bonus paycheck with the winning money if he won the race. Rudd took the 2nd-place position with three laps left, and when the white flag was waved Rudd tapped Davey Allison to take the lead. When Rudd came back around to the finish line he waved to his pit crew but was shown a black flag for the tap. His win was taken away and given to Allison who refired to end up in second place. Rudd ended up in second place; Rick Hendrick, and crew chief Waddell Wilson unsuccessfully tried to appeal the penalties.

Rudd finished the year with a career-best second-place finish in points. The following season, he won Dover, but dropped to seventh in points. After finishing another three spots lower in points in 1993, he left Hendrick to start his own racing corporation Rudd Performance Motorsports.

=== 1994–1999 ===
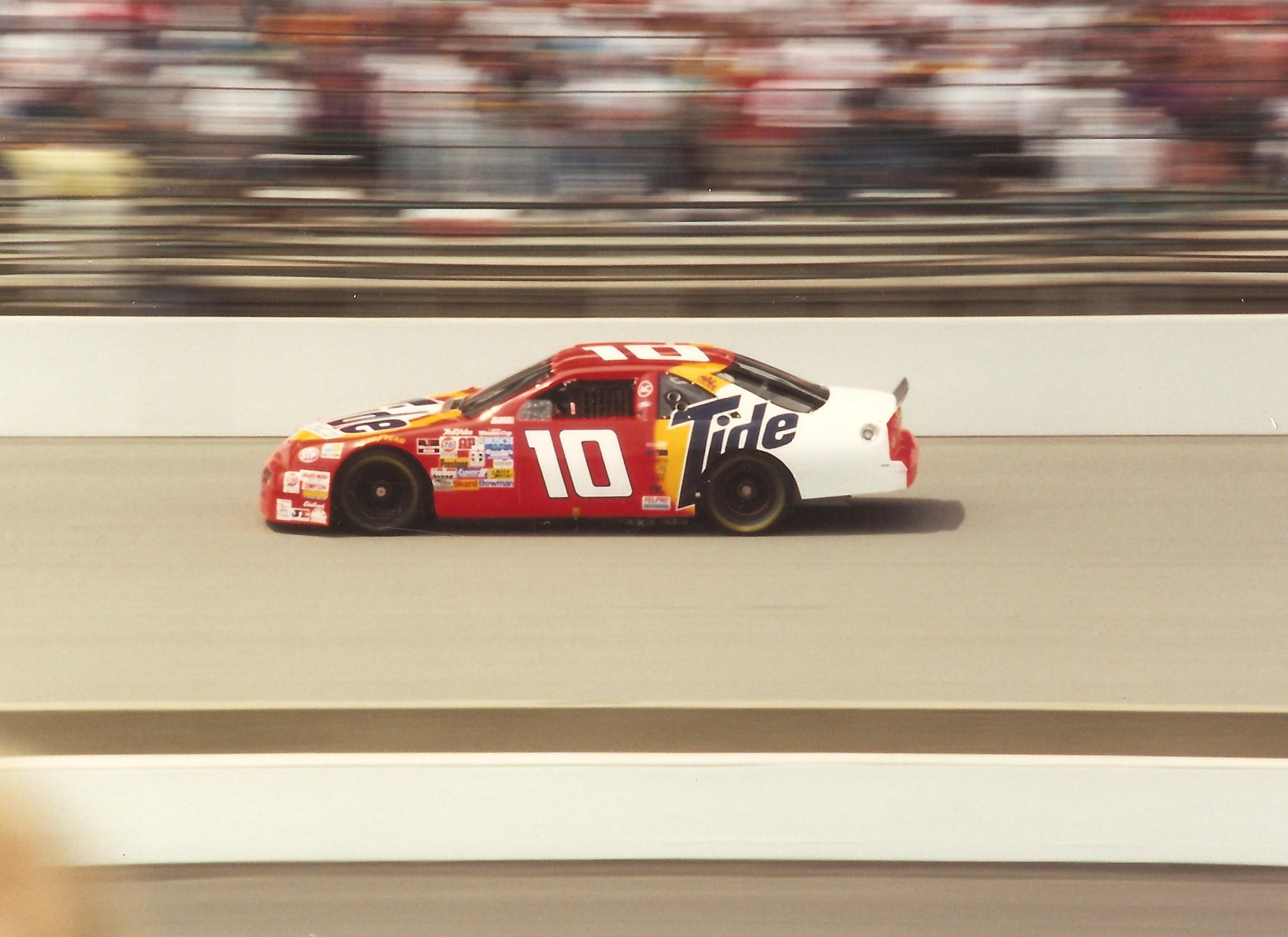
Rudd at 1994 Brickyard 400.

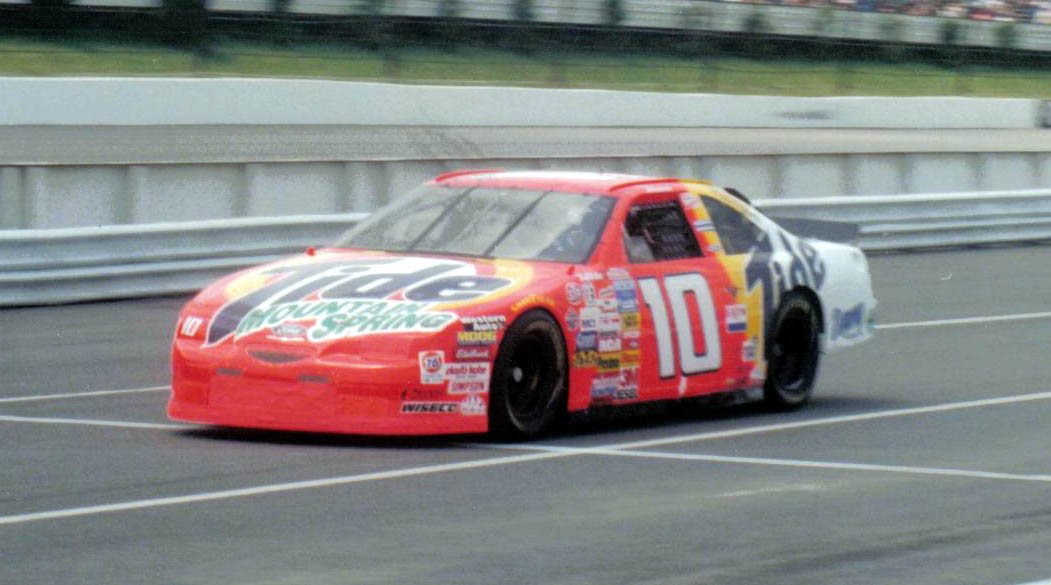
1997 Tide-sponsored racecar at Pocono

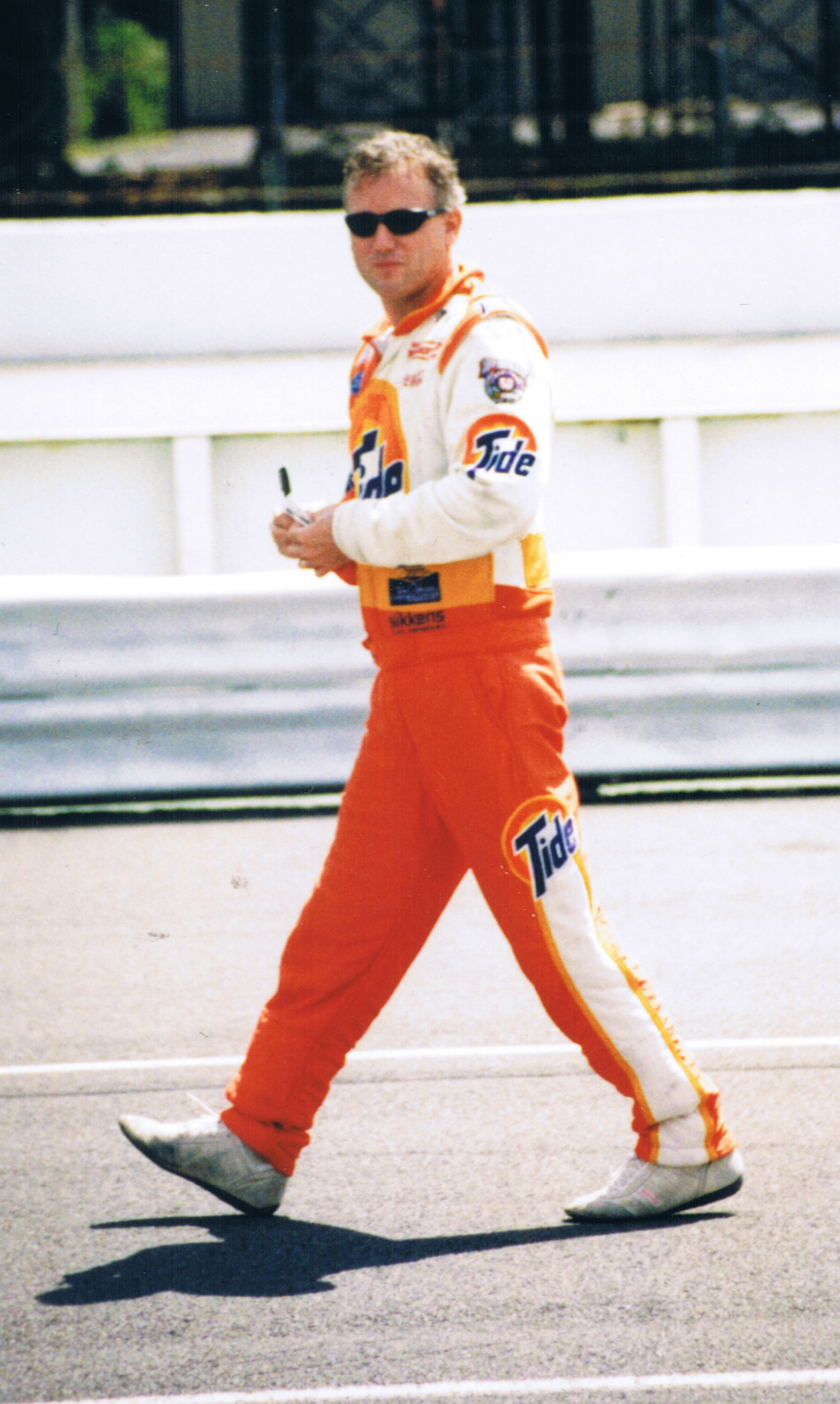
Ricky Rudd walks down pit road, before qualifying at Pocono Raceway 1998

Rudd took Tide and formed his own race team in 1994, Rudd Performance Motorsports, and drove the No. 10 Ford Thunderbird that season. His first win as an owner/driver came at New Hampshire, which led to a fifth-place points finish. 1995 saw his consecutive winning streak almost end before he won Phoenix, the second-to-last race of the season. He had another near miss in 1996, but won late in the year at Rockingham.

In 1997, Rudd had two wins, one in the Brickyard 400 and the other at Dover, making this his highest win total since 1987, but he dropped to 17th in points, making this the first time he finished outside of the top-ten in nine years. His only win in 1998 came at Martinsville, dealing with high air temperatures and a faulty cooling system. As a result, Rudd suffered burns and blisters over most of his body, and gave his victory lane interview lying on the ground breathing from an oxygen mask. This was the last win of his consecutive victory streak, as he struggled with mechanical failures and wrecks throughout the season. With sixteen winning seasons in a row, he nonetheless set a new record that stood until Kyle Busch surpassed it in 2021. The following year, Rudd failed to win a race, snapping a sixteen-season streak with at least one victory. When Tide left his team, Rudd chose to liquidate his equipment and close his team.

=== 2000–2005 ===
After many rumors and speculation, Rudd was hired to pilot the No. 28 Texaco/Havoline Ford Taurus for Robert Yates Racing in 2000. Although he still did not win any races that season, he did have two poles and moved to fifth in the points standings, a 26-spot improvement over the previous season. In 2001, Rudd got his first win in three years at Pocono, followed by another win at Richmond late in the season. He also matched a career-high fourteen top-five finishes. Rudd scored his final win at Sonoma in 2002, but dropped to tenth in points. Following the fall Richmond race, Rudd had a heated argument with RYR engine specialist Larry Lackey on pit road, with Lackey punching Rudd in the face and Rudd retaliating with a water bottle. Rudd was fined US$5,000 and placed on probation while Lackey was fined US$10,000 before resigning from his position at RYR. Rudd left RYR at the end of the 2002 season.

In 2003, Rudd signed to drive the No. 21 Ford for Wood Brothers Racing, replacing Elliott Sadler, who took over Rudd's seat at RYR. Rudd scored four top-fives and a 23rd-place finish in points that year. The following year, he won his final career pole at Talladega, but fell a spot in the standings. He was able to recover to earn nine top-tens in 2005 and improved to 21st in points. The closest he came to winning a race between 2003 and 2005 was at Sonoma in 2005, when he led several laps and finished 2nd to Tony Stewart after being passed by him with nine laps to go.

At the end of the 2005 season, Rudd left the No. 21 team and announced he would "take a break from racing", although he was not retiring. At the time he was known as NASCAR's "ironman", or record holder for most consecutive starts, ending at 788, and holding the record until it was surpassed by Jeff Gordon in 2015.

=== 2006–2007 ===
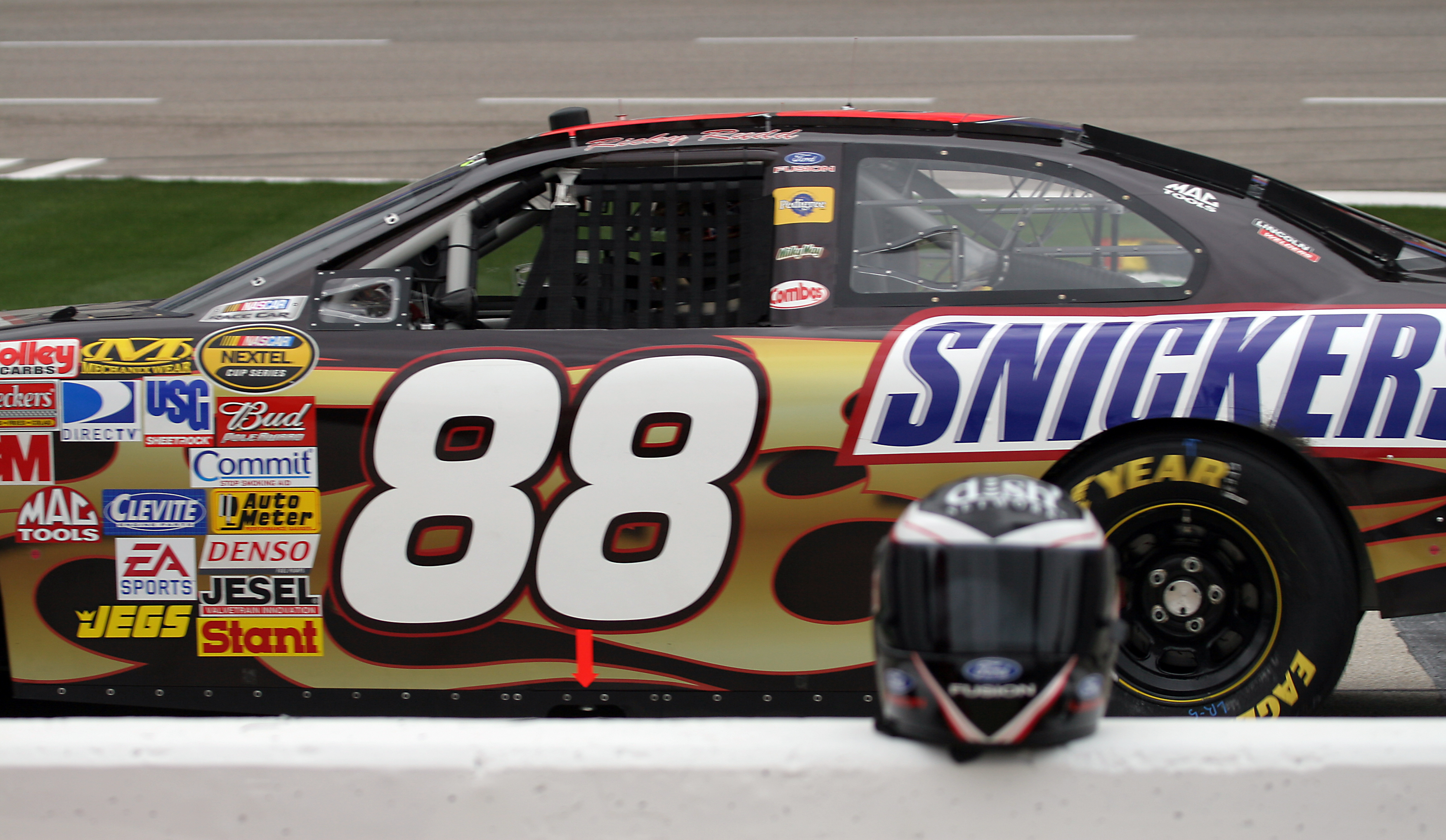
2007 car

Rudd spent most of 2006 out of racing, racing only at Dover, where he filled in for an ailing Tony Stewart. Late in the season, his return to Yates was announced, to drive the No. 88 Ford full-time. His best finish since his return to the sport was seventh in the Coca-Cola 600. Since he missed Richmond, it was the first time in his career where he did not make a start due to an injury. Kenny Wallace drove the No. 88 on an interim basis until Rudd healed, except at Talladega, where Mike Wallace drove the car. Rudd made his return at Charlotte, where he finished 11th. He finished his career with a 21st-place finish at the Ford 400 at Homestead.

== After racing ==
After the 2007 season, and a 32-year career, Rudd resides at his home in Cornelius, North Carolina. In 2007, Rudd was inducted into the 2007 Virginia Sports Hall of Fame and in 2010, he was selected to the Hampton Roads Sports Hall of Fame that honors those who have contributed to sports in southeastern Virginia. Rudd now lives what he calls "a very simple lifestyle" with his family. On February 7, 2012, Rudd signed to be an analyst for Speed Channel's weekend motor sports news program, SPEED Center. Following the announcement he said, "I'm really looking forward to the next chapter. It's going to be a lot of fun working with the gang at SPEED." In 2013, Rudd made appearances in Series Two of the TV show Dallas in scenes filmed at Texas Motor Speedway as the hired driver for Christopher Ewing's methane-powered race car.

On February 17, 2014, Rudd was inducted into the Daytona Beach Stock car Hall of Fame by Rotary International.

In 2025, Rudd was inducted into the NASCAR Hall of Fame.

Even though he retired from professional racing, Rudd still races go-karts at Trackhouse Motorplex in the Charlotte area.

== Motorsports career results ==
=== NASCAR ===
(key) (Bold – Pole position awarded by qualifying time. Italics – Pole position earned by points standings or practice time. * – Most laps led.)

==== Nextel Cup Series ====
NASCAR Nextel Cup Series results
Year	Team	No.	Make	1	2	3	4	5	6	7	8	9	10	11	12	13	14	15	16	17	18	19	20	21	22	23	24	25	26	27	28	29	30	31	32	33	34	35	36	NNCC	Pts	Ref
1975	Champion Racing	10	Ford	RSD	DAY	RCH	CAR; 11	BRI; 10	ATL; 25	NWS; 28	DAR	MAR	TAL	NSV	DOV	CLT	RSD	MCH	DAY	NSV	POC	TAL	MCH	DAR	DOV	NWS	MAR	CLT	RCH	CAR	BRI	ATL	ONT							47th	431	
1976	Rudd Racing Enterprises	22	Chevy	RSD	DAY; DNQ	CAR	RCH	BRI	ATL	NWS	DAR	MAR	TAL; 23	NSV	DOV; 33	CLT	RSD	MCH	DAY; 10	NSV	POC	TAL	MCH	BRI	DAR; DNQ	RCH	DOV	MAR	NWS	CLT; 16	CAR	ATL	ONT							53rd	407	
1977	Rudd Racing Enterprises	22	Chevy	RSD	DAY; 22		CAR; 19	ATL	NWS	DAR; 22	BRI; 10	MAR	TAL; 28	NSV; 10	DOV; 27	CLT; 17	RSD	MCH; 28	DAY; 36	NSV; 10	POC; 7	TAL; 4	MCH; 7	BRI; 16	DAR; 7	RCH; 11	DOV; 32	MAR; 27	NWS; 7	CLT; 24	CAR; 25	ATL; 8	ONT; 8							17th	2810	
1977	Rudd Racing Enterprises	22	Ford			RCH; 26																																		17th	2810	
1978	Rudd Racing Enterprises	22	Chevy	RSD	DAY; 37	RCH	CAR	ATL	BRI	DAR; 10	NWS	MAR			CLT; 28	NSV	RSD	MCH; 9			POC; 6	TAL; 39	MCH; 28	BRI	DAR; 36	RCH	DOV	MAR	NWS	CLT; 23	CAR; 25	ATL; 9	ONT; DNQ							31st	1260	
1978	Rudd Racing Enterprises	22	Buick										TAL; 27	DOV					DAY; 21	NSV																				31st	1260	
1979	Donlavey Racing	90	Mercury	RSD	DAY; 31			ATL; 9			DAR; 8		TAL; 27			CLT; 6	TWS; 28	RSD	MCH; 8	DAY; 13	NSV	POC; 5	TAL; 3	MCH; 7		DAR; 8				CLT; 11			ATL; 8	ONT; 10						9th	3642	
1979	Donlavey Racing	90	Ford			CAR; 34			NWS; 14	BRI; 10		MAR; 12		NSV; 10	DOV; 14												RCH; 3	DOV; 8	MAR; 6		NWS; 5	CAR; 20								9th	3642	
1979	Donlavey Racing	90	Chevy				RCH; 11																		BRI; 9															9th	3642	
1980	Ulrich Racing	40	Chevy	RSD	DAY	RCH	CAR; 12	ATL; 31	BRI	DAR; 19	NWS	MAR	TAL	NSV	DOV																									35th	1213	
1980	Al Rudd Auto	22	Chevy													CLT; 9	TWS	RSD	MCH; 32												CLT; 4	CAR	ATL	ONT						35th	1213	
1980	Nelson Malloch Racing	7	Olds																	DAY; 13			TAL; 20																	35th	1213	
1980	Nelson Malloch Racing	7	Chevy																		NSV; 28	POC; 10		MCH; 34	BRI; 28	DAR; 34	RCH	DOV	NWS	MAR										35th	1213	
1981	DiGard Motorsports	88	Chevy	RSD; 19																	NSV; 4	POC; 6		MCH; 3	BRI; 2	DAR; 23	RCH; 12	**DOV**; 5	MAR; 8	NWS; 25	CLT; 3	CAR; 18								6th	3988	
1981	DiGard Motorsports	88	Olds		DAY; 3	RCH; 2	CAR; 31		BRI; 2				TAL; 4				TWS; 24			DAY; 40																				6th	3988	
1981	DiGard Motorsports	88	Buick					ATL; 22		NWS; 6	DAR; 11	**MAR**; 3		**NSV**; 5*	DOV; 5	CLT; 4		RSD; 5	MCH; 30				TAL; 23										ATL; 38	RSD; 40						6th	3988	
1982	Richard Childress Racing	3	Pontiac	DAY; 35	RCH; 22	BRI; 27	ATL; 25	CAR; 15	DAR; 29	NWS; 9	MAR; 4	TAL; 24	NSV; 19	DOV; 22	CLT; 7	POC; 6	RSD; 29	MCH; 5	DAY; 7	NSV; 4	POC; 31	TAL; 9	MCH; 14	BRI; 7	DAR; 31	RCH; 4	**DOV**; 11	NWS; 25	CLT; 31	**MAR**; 2	CAR; 28	ATL; 7	RSD; 2							9th	3537	
1983	Richard Childress Racing	3	Chevy	**DAY**; 24	**RCH**; 28	**CAR**; 6	ATL; 10	DAR; 4	NWS; 27	**MAR**; 5	TAL; 8	NSV; 14	DOV; 24	BRI; 26	CLT; 32	RSD; 1*	POC; 31	MCH; 6	DAY; 21	NSV; 5	POC; 7	TAL; 16	MCH; 27	BRI; 14	DAR; 25	RCH; 2	DOV; 13	MAR; 1*	NWS; 6	CLT; 9	CAR; 3	ATL; 26	RSD; 37							9th	3693	
1984	Bud Moore Engineering	15	Ford	DAY; 7	RCH; 1	CAR; 7	ATL; 8	**BRI**; 6	**NWS**; 3*	DAR; 9	MAR; 18	TAL; 22	NSV; 4	**DOV**; 8	CLT; 11	RSD; 9	POC; 18	MCH; 40	DAY; 15	**NSV**; 16	POC; 39	TAL; 14	MCH; 12	BRI; 16	DAR; 5	RCH; 2	DOV; 3	MAR; 27	CLT; 8	NWS; 6	CAR; 23	ATL; 3	RSD; 15							7th	3918	
1985	Bud Moore Engineering	15	Ford	DAY; 5	RCH; 25	CAR; 32	ATL; 4	BRI; 2	DAR; 25	NWS; 4	MAR; 2	TAL; 5	DOV; 4	CLT; 13	RSD; 4	POC; 7	MCH; 7	DAY; 7	POC; 14	TAL; 18	MCH; 31	BRI; 9	DAR; 6	RCH; 5	DOV; 3	MAR; 4	NWS; 5	CLT; 15	CAR; 7	ATL; 31	RSD; 1									6th	3857	
1986	Bud Moore Engineering	15	Ford	DAY; 11	RCH; 30	CAR; 28	ATL; 26	BRI; 2	DAR; 26	NWS; 2	MAR; 1*	TAL; 36	**DOV**; 4	CLT; 8	RSD; 3	POC; 4	MCH; 10	DAY; 6	POC; 2	TAL; 3	GLN; 7	MCH; 21	BRI; 23	DAR; 6	RCH; 24*	DOV; 1*	MAR; 28	NWS; 7	CLT; 4	CAR; 2	ATL; 25	RSD; 19								5th	3823	
1987	Bud Moore Engineering	15	Ford	DAY; 9	CAR; 2	RCH; 28	ATL; 1	DAR; 30	NWS; 5	BRI; 3	MAR; 16	TAL; 30	CLT; 25	DOV; 12	POC; 7	RSD; 2	MCH; 14	DAY; 14	POC; 26	TAL; 15	GLN; 4	MCH; 25	BRI; 3	DAR; 7	RCH; 3	DOV; 1*	MAR; 21	NWS; 13	CLT; 11	CAR; 31	RSD; 31	ATL; 3								6th	3742	
1988	King Racing	26	Buick	DAY; 17	RCH; 2	CAR; 17	ATL; 24	DAR; 30	BRI; 20	NWS; 2	**MAR**; 18	TAL; 29	CLT; 7	DOV; 19	**RSD**; 3	POC; 30	MCH; 11	DAY; 22	POC; 12	TAL; 41	GLN; 1	MCH; 16	BRI; 16	DAR; 10	RCH; 26	DOV; 10	MAR; 24*	CLT; 8	NWS; 7*	CAR; 2	PHO; 26*	ATL; 4								11th	3547	
1989	King Racing	26	Buick	DAY; 19	CAR; 32	ATL; 24	RCH; 4	DAR; 12	BRI; 8	NWS; 6	MAR; 23	TAL; 31	CLT; 10	DOV; 6	SON; 1*	POC; 20	MCH; 4	DAY; 9	POC; 31	TAL; 17	GLN; 29	MCH; 8	BRI; 3	DAR; 3	RCH; 4	DOV; 5	MAR; 8	CLT; 21	NWS; 9	CAR; 28	PHO; 29	ATL; 14								8th	3608	
1990	Hendrick Motorsports	5	Chevy	DAY; 4	**RCH**; 3	CAR; 31	ATL; 27	DAR; 24	BRI; 3	NWS; 4	MAR; 23	TAL; 33	CLT; 28	DOV; 11	**SON**; 3	POC; 32	MCH; 9	DAY; 13	POC; 7	TAL; 5	GLN; 1	MCH; 5	BRI; 10	DAR; 7	RCH; 8	DOV; 32	MAR; 28*	NWS; 11	CLT; 6	CAR; 7	PHO; 32	ATL; 16								7th	3601	
1991	Hendrick Motorsports	5	Chevy	DAY; 9	RCH; 2*	CAR; 4	ATL; 6	DAR; 1	BRI; 5*	NWS; 11	MAR; 11	TAL; 13	CLT; 9	DOV; 10	**SON**; 2	POC; 20	MCH; 8	DAY; 9	POC; 20	TAL; 4	GLN; 2	MCH; 11	BRI; 5	DAR; 15	RCH; 5	DOV; 7	MAR; 8	NWS; 12	CLT; 32	CAR; 12	PHO; 11	ATL; 11								2nd	4092	
1992	Hendrick Motorsports	5	Chevy	DAY; 40	CAR; 28	RCH; 6	ATL; 12	DAR; 5	BRI; 6	NWS; 3	MAR; 23	TAL; 26	CLT; 9	DOV; 6	**SON**; 4	POC; 36	MCH; 5	DAY; 7	POC; 4	TAL; 4*	GLN; 13	MCH; 36	BRI; 8	DAR; 10	RCH; 6	DOV; 1	MAR; 10	NWS; 15	CLT; 5	CAR; 3	PHO; 30	ATL; 25								7th	3735	
1993	Hendrick Motorsports	5	Chevy	DAY; 30	CAR; 12	RCH; 15	ATL; 5	DAR; 19	BRI; 26	NWS; 7	MAR; 29	TAL; 41	SON; 3	CLT; 37	DOV; 35	POC; 9	MCH; 1	DAY; 4	NHA; 5	POC; 11	TAL; 24	GLN; 24	MCH; 35*	BRI; 22	DAR; 6	RCH; 4	DOV; 21	MAR; 4	NWS; 5	CLT; 8	CAR; 14	PHO; 6	ATL; 2							10th	3644	
1994	Rudd Performance Motorsports	10	Ford	DAY; 8	CAR; 11	RCH; 18	ATL; 9	DAR; 9	BRI; 32	NWS; 6	MAR; 12	TAL; 25	SON; 14	CLT; 6	DOV; 19	POC; 21	MCH; 4	DAY; 17	NHA; 1	POC; 6	TAL; 7	IND; 11	GLN; 5	MCH; 10	BRI; 12	DAR; 4	RCH; 5	DOV; 18	MAR; 25	NWS; 11	CLT; 29	**CAR**; 4	PHO; 7	ATL; 14						5th	4050	
1995	Rudd Performance Motorsports	10	Ford	DAY; 13	CAR; 4	RCH; 21	ATL; 8	DAR; 41	BRI; 5	NWS; 29	MAR; 30	TAL; 22	**SON**; 4	CLT; 5	DOV; 31	POC; 13	MCH; 38	DAY; 8	NHA; 5	POC; 3	TAL; 41	IND; 20	GLN; 4	MCH; 30	BRI; 36	DAR; 6	RCH; 8	DOV; 10	MAR; 27	NWS; 5	**CLT**; 4*	CAR; 13	PHO; 1	ATL; 10						9th	3734	
1996	Rudd Performance Motorsports	10	Ford	DAY; 9	CAR; 4	RCH; 9	ATL; 8	DAR; 9	BRI; 14	NWS; 15	MAR; 23	TAL; 28	SON; 7	CLT; 15	DOV; 8	POC; 2	MCH; 31	DAY; 33	NHA; 3	POC; 2	TAL; 37	IND; 6	GLN; 34	MCH; 8	BRI; 9	DAR; 16	RCH; 12	DOV; 34	MAR; 35	NWS; 7	CLT; 13	CAR; 1	PHO; 14	ATL; 8						6th	3845	
1997	Rudd Performance Motorsports	10	Ford	DAY; 9	CAR; 4	RCH; 6	ATL; 30	DAR; 23	TEX; 5	BRI; 27	MAR; 13	SON; 34	TAL; 11	CLT; 10	DOV; 1	POC; 21	MCH; 13	CAL; 3	DAY; 34	NHA; 9	POC; 36	IND; 1	GLN; 40	MCH; 29	BRI; 19	DAR; 5	RCH; 28	NHA; 42	DOV; 6	MAR; 13	CLT; 41	TAL; 34	CAR; 40	PHO; 36	ATL; 37					17th	3330	
1998	Rudd Performance Motorsports	10	Ford	DAY; 42	CAR; 43	LVS; 12	ATL; 23	DAR; 33	BRI; 30	TEX; 27	MAR; 14	TAL; 24	CAL; 11	CLT; 31	DOV; 6	RCH; 11	MCH; 37	POC; 41	SON; 28	NHA; 19	POC; 42	IND; 31	GLN; 14	MCH; 13	BRI; 9	NHA; 10	DAR; 22	RCH; 34	DOV; 13	MAR; 1	CLT; 37	TAL; 18	DAY; 27	PHO; 27	CAR; 10	ATL; 24				22nd	3131	
1999	Rudd Performance Motorsports	10	Ford	DAY; 30	**CAR**; 30	LVS; 43	ATL; 25	DAR; 27	TEX; 19	BRI; 38	MAR; 29	TAL; 19	CAL; 41	RCH; 36	CLT; 28	DOV; 14	MCH; 38	POC; 15	SON; 38	DAY; 13	NHA; 27	POC; 27	IND; 9	GLN; 32	MCH; 38	BRI; 3	DAR; 34	RCH; 27	NHA; 42	DOV; 37	MAR; 18	CLT; 38	TAL; 3	CAR; 19	PHO; 5	HOM; 41	ATL; 7			31st	2922	
2000	Yates Racing	28	Ford	DAY; 15	CAR; 6	**LVS**; 12	ATL; 11	DAR; 17	BRI; 14	TEX; 10	MAR; 22	TAL; 27	CAL; 4	RCH; 4	CLT; 17	DOV; 5	MCH; 12	POC; 3	SON; 5	DAY; 5	NHA; 10	POC; 38	**IND**; 21	GLN; 11	MCH; 2	BRI; 10	DAR; 8	RCH; 9	NHA; 3	DOV; 3	MAR; 4	CLT; 3*	TAL; 11	CAR; 3	PHO; 37	HOM; 6	ATL; 24			5th	4575	
2001	Yates Racing	28	Ford	DAY; 4	CAR; 39	LVS; 19	ATL; 6	DAR; 8	BRI; 10	TEX; 37	MAR; 2	TAL; 14	CAL; 6	RCH; 5	CLT; 7	DOV; 10	MCH; 2	**POC**; 1	SON; 4	DAY; 14	CHI; 3	NHA; 3	POC; 11	IND; 39	GLN; 4	MCH; 42	BRI; 4	DAR; 7	RCH; 1	DOV; 3	KAN; 3	CLT; 21	MAR; 39	TAL; 26	PHO; 3	CAR; 8	HOM; 21	ATL; 35	NHA; 13	4th	4706	
2002	Yates Racing	28	Ford	DAY; 38	CAR; 18	LVS; 13	ATL; 20	DAR; 12	BRI; 3	TEX; 4	MAR; 7	TAL; 14	CAL; 3	RCH; 39	CLT; 4	DOV; 19	POC; 17*	MCH; 8	SON; 1	DAY; 15	CHI; 19	NHA; 17	POC; 10	IND; 18	**GLN**; 5	MCH; 12	BRI; 39	DAR; 30	RCH; 7	NHA; 12	DOV; 14	KAN; 20	TAL; 3	CLT; 39	MAR; 3	ATL; 32	CAR; 20	PHO; 13	HOM; 19	10th	4323	
2003	Wood Brothers Racing	21	Ford	DAY; 15	CAR; 11	LVS; 19	ATL; 35	DAR; 15	BRI; 4	TEX; 26	TAL; 42	MAR; 11	CAL; 24	RCH; 34	CLT; 33	DOV; 17	POC; 37	MCH; 43	SON; 15	DAY; 3	CHI; 13	NHA; 12	POC; 39	IND; 38	GLN; 21	MCH; 29	BRI; 33	DAR; 16	RCH; 3	NHA; 2	DOV; 11	TAL; 36	KAN; 10	CLT; 23	MAR; 15	ATL; 31	PHO; 17	CAR; 40	HOM; 31	23rd	3521	
2004	Wood Brothers Racing	21	Ford	DAY; 18	CAR; 19	LVS; 28	ATL; 31	DAR; 33	BRI; 37	TEX; 22	MAR; 20	**TAL**; 17	CAL; 17	RCH; 11	CLT; 26	DOV; 30	POC; 19	MCH; 12	SON; 35	DAY; 17	CHI; 32	NHA; 39	POC; 12	IND; 28	GLN; 8	MCH; 24	BRI; 40	CAL; 17	RCH; 21	NHA; 37	DOV; 12	TAL; 12	KAN; 2	CLT; 16	MAR; 14	ATL; 12	PHO; 19	DAR; 16	HOM; 9	24th	3615	
2005	Wood Brothers Racing	21	Ford	DAY; 24	CAL; 41	LVS; 37	ATL; 33	BRI; 25	MAR; 7	TEX; 8	PHO; 34	TAL; 30	DAR; 13	RCH; 11	CLT; 35	DOV; 40	POC; 28	MCH; 33	SON; 2	DAY; 13	CHI; 7	NHA; 23	POC; 10	IND; 41	GLN; 16	MCH; 19	BRI; 4	CAL; 9	RCH; 38	NHA; 20	DOV; 12	TAL; 18	KAN; 9	CLT; 9	MAR; 11	ATL; 17	TEX; 13	PHO; 20	HOM; 37	21st	3667	
2006	Joe Gibbs Racing	20	Chevy	DAY	CAL	LVS	ATL	BRI	MAR	TEX	PHO	TAL	RCH	DAR	CLT	DOV; QL^{†}	POC	MCH	SON	DAY	CHI	NHA	POC	IND	GLN	MCH	BRI	CAL	RCH	NHA	DOV	KAN	TAL	CLT	MAR	ATL	TEX	PHO	HOM	NA	-	
2007	Yates Racing	88	Ford	DAY; 26	CAL; 27	LVS; 30	ATL; 26	BRI; 38	MAR; 13	TEX; 33	PHO; 26	TAL; 33	RCH; 37	DAR; 26	CLT; 7	DOV; 39	POC; 27	MCH; 22	SON; 11	NHA; 30	DAY; 31	CHI; 21	IND; 24	POC; 13	GLN; 38	MCH; 33	BRI; 38	CAL; 40	RCH	NHA	DOV	KAN	TAL	CLT; 11	MAR; 27	ATL; 17	TEX; 15	PHO; 35	HOM; 21	33rd	2622	
^{†} - Qualified for Tony Stewart

===== Daytona 500 =====
Year	Team	Manufacturer	Start	Finish
1976	Al Rudd Auto	Chevy	DNQ	
1977	Al Rudd Auto	Chevy	21	22
1978	Al Rudd Auto	Chevy	36	37
1979	Donlavey Racing	Mercury	11	31
1981	DiGard Motorsports	Olds	5	3
1982	Richard Childress Racing	Pontiac	16	35
1983	Richard Childress Racing	Chevy	**1**	24
1984	Bud Moore Engineering	Ford	14	7
1985	Bud Moore Engineering	Ford	9	5
1986	Bud Moore Engineering	Ford	22	11
1987	Bud Moore Engineering	Ford	31	9
1988	King Racing	Buick	27	17
1989	King Racing	Buick	36	19
1990	Hendrick Motorsports	Chevy	19	4
1991	Hendrick Motorsports	Chevy	9	9
1992	Hendrick Motorsports	Chevy	8	40
1993	Hendrick Motorsports	Chevy	12	30
1994	Rudd Performance Motorsports	Ford	20	8
1995	Rudd Performance Motorsports	Ford	18	13
1996	Rudd Performance Motorsports	Ford	10	9
1997	Rudd Performance Motorsports	Ford	13	9
1998	Rudd Performance Motorsports	Ford	40	42
1999	Rudd Performance Motorsports	Ford	29	30
2000	Yates Racing	Ford	2	15
2001	Yates Racing	Ford	30	4
2002	Yates Racing	Ford	9	38
2003	Wood Brothers Racing	Ford	5	15
2004	Wood Brothers Racing	Ford	16	18
2005	Wood Brothers Racing	Ford	11	24
2007	Yates Racing	Ford	2	26

==== Budweiser Late Model Sportsman Series ====
NASCAR Budweiser Late Model Sportsman Series results
Year	Team	No.	Make	1	2	3	4	5	6	7	8	9	10	11	12	13	14	15	16	17	18	19	20	21	22	23	24	25	26	27	28	29	30	31	32	33	34	35	NLMC	Pts	Ref
1983	Zervakis Racing Team	01	Olds	DAY	RCH	CAR	HCY	MAR	NWS	SBO	GPS	LGY	DOV; 1	BRI	CLT	SBO	HCY	ROU	SBO	ROU	CRW	ROU	SBO	HCY	LGY	IRP	GPS	BRI	HCY										65th	311	
1983	Zervakis Racing Team	01	Pontiac																											DAR; 31	RCH	NWS	SBO	MAR	ROU	CLT; 34	HCY	MAR	65th	311	

=== International Race of Champions ===
(key) (Bold – Pole position. * – Most laps led.)

International Race of Champions results
Year	Make	1	2	3	4	Pos.	Pts	Ref
1992	Dodge	DAY; 2*	TAL; 3	MCH; 3	MCH; 2	1st	68.5	
1993	Dodge	DAY; 5*	DAR; 5	TAL; 4	MCH; 7	4th	49	
1995	Dodge	**DAY**; 4	DAR; 11	TAL; 8	MCH; 10	10th	28	
1996	Pontiac	DAY	TAL	CLT	MCH; 10	NA	0	
2001	Pontiac	DAY; 2	TAL; 4	MCH; 10	IND; 6	6th	45	

Sporting positions
Preceded by Rusty Wallace	IROC Champion; IROC XVI (1992)	Succeeded by Davey Allison and Terry Labonte; Note: Allison died before the final race and was replaced by Labonte for that event.
Achievements
Preceded by Dale Jarrett	Brickyard 400 winner 1997	Succeeded by Jeff Gordon
Awards
Preceded by Skip Manning	NASCAR Winston Cup Series Rookie of the Year; 1977	Succeeded by Ronnie Thomas
