= 1993 Coca-Cola 600 =

11th race of the 1993 NASCAR Winston Cup Series

Race details
- Race 11 of 30 in the 1993 NASCAR Winston Cup Series
- The 1993 Coca-Cola 600 program cover, with artwork by NASCAR artist Sam Bass.
- Date: May 30, 1993
- Official name: 34th Annual Coca-Cola 600
- Location: Concord, North Carolina, Charlotte Motor Speedway
- Course: Permanent racing facility
- Course length: 1.5 miles (2.414 km)
- Distance: 400 laps, 600 mi (965.606 km)
- Average speed: 145.504 miles per hour (234.166 km/h)
- Attendance: 162,000

Pole position
Driver	Ken Schrader	Hendrick Motorsports
- Time: 30.448

Most laps led
Driver	Dale Earnhardt	Richard Childress Racing
- Laps: 152

Winner
No. 3	Dale Earnhardt	Richard Childress Racing

Television in the United States
- Network: TBS
- Announcers: Ken Squier, Neil Bonnett

Radio in the United States
- Radio: Performance Racing Network

The 1993 Coca-Cola 600 was the 11th stock car race of the 1993 NASCAR Winston Cup Series season and the 34th iteration of the event. The race was held on Sunday, May 30, 1993, before an audience of 162,000 in Concord, North Carolina, at Charlotte Motor Speedway, a 1.5 miles (2.4 km) permanent quad-oval. The race took the scheduled 400 laps to complete. At race's end, Richard Childress Racing driver Dale Earnhardt would manage to overcome two penalties throughout the race and come back to win his 55th career NASCAR Winston Cup Series victory and his second victory of the season. To fill out the top three, Hendrick Motorsports driver Jeff Gordon and Joe Gibbs Racing driver Dale Jarrett would finish second and third, respectively.

== Background ==
The layout of Charlotte Motor Speedway, the venue where the race was held.

Charlotte Motor Speedway is a motorsports complex located in Concord, North Carolina, United States 13 miles from Charlotte, North Carolina. The complex features a 1.5 miles (2.4 km) quad oval track that hosts NASCAR racing including the prestigious Coca-Cola 600 on Memorial Day weekend and the NEXTEL All-Star Challenge, as well as the UAW-GM Quality 500. The speedway was built in 1959 by Bruton Smith and is considered the home track for NASCAR with many race teams located in the Charlotte area. The track is owned and operated by Speedway Motorsports Inc. (SMI) with Marcus Smith (son of Bruton Smith) as track president.

=== Entry list ===
- (R) denotes rookie driver.

#	Driver	Team	Make
1	Rick Mast	Precision Products Racing	Ford
2	Rusty Wallace	Penske Racing South	Pontiac
3	Dale Earnhardt	Richard Childress Racing	Chevrolet
4	Ernie Irvan	Morgan–McClure Motorsports	Chevrolet
5	Ricky Rudd	Hendrick Motorsports	Chevrolet
6	Mark Martin	Roush Racing	Ford
7	Jimmy Hensley	AK Racing	Ford
8	Sterling Marlin	Stavola Brothers Racing	Ford
9	Chad Little	Melling Racing	Ford
11	Bill Elliott	Junior Johnson & Associates	Ford
12	Jimmy Spencer	Bobby Allison Motorsports	Ford
14	Terry Labonte	Hagan Racing	Chevrolet
15	Geoff Bodine	Bud Moore Engineering	Ford
16	Wally Dallenbach Jr.	Roush Racing	Ford
17	Darrell Waltrip	Darrell Waltrip Motorsports	Chevrolet
18	Dale Jarrett	Joe Gibbs Racing	Chevrolet
20	Joe Ruttman	Moroso Racing	Ford
21	Morgan Shepherd	Wood Brothers Racing	Ford
22	Bobby Labonte (R)	Bill Davis Racing	Ford
24	Jeff Gordon (R)	Hendrick Motorsports	Chevrolet
25	Ken Schrader	Hendrick Motorsports	Chevrolet
26	Brett Bodine	King Racing	Ford
27	Hut Stricklin	Junior Johnson & Associates	Ford
28	Davey Allison	Robert Yates Racing	Ford
30	Michael Waltrip	Bahari Racing	Pontiac
32	Jimmy Horton	Active Motorsports	Chevrolet
33	Harry Gant	Leo Jackson Motorsports	Chevrolet
38	Bobby Hamilton	Akins Motorsports	Ford
40	Kenny Wallace (R)	SABCO Racing	Pontiac
41	Phil Parsons	Larry Hedrick Motorsports	Chevrolet
42	Kyle Petty	SABCO Racing	Pontiac
44	Rick Wilson	Petty Enterprises	Pontiac
45	Rich Bickle	Terminal Trucking Motorsports	Ford
48	James Hylton	Hylton Motorsports	Pontiac
49	Stanley Smith	BS&S Motorsports	Chevrolet
52	Jimmy Means	Jimmy Means Racing	Ford
55	Ted Musgrave	RaDiUs Motorsports	Ford
64	Johnny Chapman	Bahre Racing	Chevrolet
65	Jerry O'Neil	O'Neil Racing	Oldsmobile
66	Mike Wallace	Owen Racing	Pontiac
68	Greg Sacks	TriStar Motorsports	Ford
71	Dave Marcis	Marcis Auto Racing	Chevrolet
75	Dick Trickle	Butch Mock Motorsports	Ford
83	Lake Speed	Speed Racing	Ford
84	Rick Crawford	Circle Bar Racing	Ford
85	Ken Bouchard	Mansion Motorsports	Ford
90	Bobby Hillin Jr.	Donlavey Racing	Ford
98	Derrike Cope	Cale Yarborough Motorsports	Ford

== Qualifying ==
Qualifying was split into two rounds. The first round was held on Wednesday, May 26, at 7:00 PM EST. Each driver would have one lap to set a time. During the first round, the top 25 drivers in the round would be guaranteed a starting spot in the race. If a driver was not able to guarantee a spot in the first round, they had the option to scrub their time from the first round and try and run a faster lap time in a second round qualifying run, held on Thursday, May 27, at 2:30 PM EST. As with the first round, each driver would have one lap to set a time. For this specific race, positions 26-40 would be decided on time, and depending on who needed it, a select amount of positions were given to cars who had not otherwise qualified but were high enough in owner's points; up to two were given. If needed, a past champion who did not qualify on either time or provisionals could use a champion's provisional, adding one more spot to the field.

Ken Schrader, driving for Hendrick Motorsports, won the pole, setting a time of 30.448 and an average speed of 177.352 mph (285.420 km/h) in the first round.

Seven drivers would fail to qualify.

=== Full qualifying results ===
Pos.	#	Driver	Team	Make	Time	Speed
1	25	Ken Schrader	Hendrick Motorsports	Chevrolet	30.448	177.352
2	26	Brett Bodine	King Racing	Ford	30.486	177.130
3	6	Mark Martin	Roush Racing	Ford	30.538	176.829
4	1	Rick Mast	Precision Products Racing	Ford	30.598	176.482
5	15	Geoff Bodine	Bud Moore Engineering	Ford	30.656	176.148
6	30	Michael Waltrip	Bahari Racing	Pontiac	30.667	176.085
7	8	Sterling Marlin	Stavola Brothers Racing	Ford	30.698	175.907
8	2	Rusty Wallace	Penske Racing South	Pontiac	30.702	175.884
9	44	Rick Wilson	Petty Enterprises	Pontiac	30.724	175.758
10	7	Jimmy Hensley	AK Racing	Ford	30.753	175.593
11	68	Greg Sacks	TriStar Motorsports	Ford	30.791	175.376
12	21	Morgan Shepherd	Wood Brothers Racing	Ford	30.808	175.279
13	22	Bobby Labonte (R)	Bill Davis Racing	Ford	30.866	174.950
14	3	Dale Earnhardt	Richard Childress Racing	Chevrolet	30.877	174.887
15	83	Lake Speed	Speed Racing	Ford	30.897	174.774
16	98	Derrike Cope	Cale Yarborough Motorsports	Ford	30.905	174.729
17	16	Wally Dallenbach Jr.	Roush Racing	Ford	30.909	174.706
18	55	Ted Musgrave	RaDiUs Motorsports	Ford	30.927	174.605
19	4	Ernie Irvan	Morgan–McClure Motorsports	Chevrolet	30.944	174.509
20	5	Ricky Rudd	Hendrick Motorsports	Chevrolet	30.977	174.323
Failed to lock in Round 1
21	24	Jeff Gordon (R)	Hendrick Motorsports	Chevrolet	30.996	174.216
22	41	Phil Parsons	Larry Hedrick Motorsports	Chevrolet	31.013	174.121
23	28	Davey Allison	Robert Yates Racing	Ford	31.025	174.053
24	40	Kenny Wallace (R)	SABCO Racing	Pontiac	31.048	173.924
25	33	Harry Gant	Leo Jackson Motorsports	Chevrolet	31.051	173.907
26	27	Hut Stricklin	Junior Johnson & Associates	Ford	31.110	173.578
27	12	Jimmy Spencer	Bobby Allison Motorsports	Ford	31.123	173.505
28	90	Bobby Hillin Jr.	Donlavey Racing	Ford	31.142	173.399
29	14	Terry Labonte	Hagan Racing	Chevrolet	31.161	173.294
30	11	Bill Elliott	Junior Johnson & Associates	Ford	31.175	173.216
31	17	Darrell Waltrip	Darrell Waltrip Motorsports	Chevrolet	31.186	173.155
32	18	Dale Jarrett	Joe Gibbs Racing	Chevrolet	31.252	172.789
33	52	Jimmy Means	Jimmy Means Racing	Ford	31.264	172.723
34	45	Rich Bickle	Terminal Trucking Motorsports	Ford	31.284	172.612
35	42	Kyle Petty	SABCO Racing	Pontiac	31.298	172.535
36	75	Dick Trickle	Butch Mock Motorsports	Ford	31.323	172.397
37	66	Mike Wallace	Owen Racing	Pontiac	31.402	171.964
38	9	Chad Little	Melling Racing	Ford	31.469	171.597
39	32	Jimmy Horton	Active Motorsports	Chevrolet	31.493	171.467
40	20	Joe Ruttman	Moroso Racing	Ford	31.533	171.249
Provisional
41	71	Dave Marcis	Marcis Auto Racing	Chevrolet	-*	-*
Failed to qualify
42	85	Ken Bouchard	Mansion Motorsports	Ford	-*	-*
43	48	James Hylton	Hylton Motorsports	Pontiac	-*	-*
44	84	Rick Crawford	Circle Bar Racing	Ford	-*	-*
45	38	Bobby Hamilton	Akins Motorsports	Ford	-*	-*
46	65	Jerry O'Neil	O'Neil Racing	Oldsmobile	-*	-*
47	49	Stanley Smith	BS&S Motorsports	Chevrolet	-*	-*
48	64	Johnny Chapman	Bahre Racing	Chevrolet	-*	-*
Official first round qualifying results
Official starting lineup

== Race results ==
Fin	St	#	Driver	Team	Make	Laps	Led	Status	Pts	Winnings
1	14	3	Dale Earnhardt	Richard Childress Racing	Chevrolet	400	152	running	185	$156,650
2	21	24	Jeff Gordon (R)	Hendrick Motorsports	Chevrolet	400	3	running	175	$79,050
3	32	18	Dale Jarrett	Joe Gibbs Racing	Chevrolet	400	114	running	170	$73,100
4	1	25	Ken Schrader	Hendrick Motorsports	Chevrolet	400	38	running	165	$91,550
5	19	4	Ernie Irvan	Morgan–McClure Motorsports	Chevrolet	400	42	running	160	$46,600
6	30	11	Bill Elliott	Junior Johnson & Associates	Ford	400	0	running	150	$35,300
7	27	12	Jimmy Spencer	Bobby Allison Motorsports	Ford	400	0	running	146	$28,700
8	13	22	Bobby Labonte (R)	Bill Davis Racing	Ford	400	4	running	147	$24,300
9	12	21	Morgan Shepherd	Wood Brothers Racing	Ford	399	5	running	143	$25,250
10	5	15	Geoff Bodine	Bud Moore Engineering	Ford	399	19	running	139	$32,600
11	31	17	Darrell Waltrip	Darrell Waltrip Motorsports	Chevrolet	399	0	running	130	$26,300
12	22	41	Phil Parsons	Larry Hedrick Motorsports	Chevrolet	398	0	running	127	$18,225
13	6	30	Michael Waltrip	Bahari Racing	Pontiac	398	0	running	124	$18,800
14	35	42	Kyle Petty	SABCO Racing	Pontiac	398	0	running	121	$21,700
15	10	7	Jimmy Hensley	AK Racing	Ford	398	0	running	118	$22,650
16	28	90	Bobby Hillin Jr.	Donlavey Racing	Ford	398	0	running	115	$11,570
17	11	68	Greg Sacks	TriStar Motorsports	Ford	398	0	running	112	$10,880
18	25	33	Harry Gant	Leo Jackson Motorsports	Chevrolet	398	0	running	109	$19,100
19	36	75	Dick Trickle	Butch Mock Motorsports	Ford	395	0	running	106	$9,500
20	26	27	Hut Stricklin	Junior Johnson & Associates	Ford	394	0	running	103	$14,750
21	34	45	Rich Bickle	Terminal Trucking Motorsports	Ford	393	1	running	105	$8,650
22	37	66	Mike Wallace	Owen Racing	Pontiac	392	0	running	97	$8,325
23	24	40	Kenny Wallace (R)	SABCO Racing	Pontiac	392	0	running	94	$10,000
24	7	8	Sterling Marlin	Stavola Brothers Racing	Ford	392	0	running	91	$13,200
25	39	32	Jimmy Horton	Active Motorsports	Chevrolet	388	0	running	88	$7,480
26	18	55	Ted Musgrave	RaDiUs Motorsports	Ford	376	0	running	85	$12,150
27	15	83	Lake Speed	Speed Racing	Ford	364	0	running	82	$7,150
28	3	6	Mark Martin	Roush Racing	Ford	355	22	engine	84	$20,710
29	8	2	Rusty Wallace	Penske Racing South	Pontiac	353	0	accident	76	$14,880
30	23	28	Davey Allison	Robert Yates Racing	Ford	342	0	running	73	$18,750
31	4	1	Rick Mast	Precision Products Racing	Ford	334	0	running	70	$13,900
32	9	44	Rick Wilson	Petty Enterprises	Pontiac	330	0	engine	67	$8,600
33	29	14	Terry Labonte	Hagan Racing	Chevrolet	273	0	engine	64	$11,050
34	38	9	Chad Little	Melling Racing	Ford	263	0	rotor	61	$6,900
35	40	20	Joe Ruttman	Moroso Racing	Ford	231	0	engine	58	$6,350
36	16	98	Derrike Cope	Cale Yarborough Motorsports	Ford	182	0	engine	55	$10,875
37	20	5	Ricky Rudd	Hendrick Motorsports	Chevrolet	164	0	engine	52	$11,310
38	33	52	Jimmy Means	Jimmy Means Racing	Ford	107	0	engine	49	$6,225
39	41	71	Dave Marcis	Marcis Auto Racing	Chevrolet	44	0	engine	46	$6,200
40	17	16	Wally Dallenbach Jr.	Roush Racing	Ford	28	0	engine	43	$10,700
41	2	26	Brett Bodine	King Racing	Ford	5	0	engine	40	$15,675
Official race results

== Standings after the race ==
Drivers' Championship standings

	Pos	Driver	Points
	1	Dale Earnhardt	1,711
	2	Rusty Wallace	1,582 (-129)
3	3	Dale Jarrett	1,503 (-208)
1	4	Geoff Bodine	1,491 (–220)
1	5	Kyle Petty	1,484 (–227)
3	6	Davey Allison	1,481 (–230)
1	7	Ernie Irvan	1,435 (–276)
1	8	Morgan Shepherd	1,430 (–281)
1	9	Jeff Gordon	1,382 (–329)
1	10	Ken Schrader	1,357 (–354)
Official driver's standings

- Note: Only the first 10 positions are included for the driver standings.

Previous race: 1993 Save Mart Supermarkets 300K	NASCAR Winston Cup Series; 1993 season	Next race: 1993 Budweiser 500
