= 1987 Delaware 500 =

23rd race of the 1987 NASCAR Winston Cup Series

Race details
- Race 23 of 29 in the 1987 NASCAR Winston Cup Series
- The 1987 Delaware 500 program cover.
- Date: September 20, 1987
- Official name: 17th Annual Delaware 500
- Location: Dover, Delaware, Dover Downs International Speedway
- Course: Permanent racing facility
- Course length: 1.6 km (1 miles)
- Distance: 500 laps, 500 mi (804.672 km)
- Scheduled distance: 500 laps, 500 mi (804.672 km)
- Average speed: 124.706 miles per hour (200.695 km/h)
- Attendance: 51,500

Pole position
Driver	Alan Kulwicki	AK Racing
- Time: 24.687

Most laps led
Driver	Ricky Rudd	Bud Moore Engineering
- Laps: 373

Winner
No. 15	Ricky Rudd	Bud Moore Engineering

Television in the United States
- Network: ESPN
- Announcers: Bob Jenkins, Larry Nuber

Radio in the United States
- Radio: Motor Racing Network

The 1987 Delaware 500 was the 23rd stock car race of the 1987 NASCAR Winston Cup Series season and the 17th iteration of the event. The race was held on Sunday, September 20, 1987, before an audience of 51,500 in Dover, Delaware at Dover Downs International Speedway, a 1-mile (1.6 km) permanent oval-shaped racetrack. The race took the scheduled 500 laps to complete.

By race's end, Bud Moore Engineering's Ricky Rudd managed to dominate a majority of the race, leading 373 laps en route to his eighth career NASCAR Winston Cup Series victory and his second and final victory of the season. To fill out the top three, Ranier-Lundy Racing's Davey Allison and RahMoc Enterprises' Neil Bonnett finished second and third, respectively.

== Background ==
The layout of Dover Downs International Speedway, the venue where the race was held.

Dover Downs International Speedway is an oval race track in Dover, Delaware, United States that has held at least two NASCAR races since it opened in 1969. In addition to NASCAR, the track also hosted USAC and the NTT IndyCar Series. The track features one layout, a 1-mile (1.6 km) concrete oval, with 24° banking in the turns and 9° banking on the straights. The speedway is owned and operated by Dover Motorsports.

The track, nicknamed "The Monster Mile", was built in 1969 by Melvin Joseph of Melvin L. Joseph Construction Company, Inc., with an asphalt surface, but was replaced with concrete in 1995. Six years later in 2001, the track's capacity moved to 135,000 seats, making the track have the largest capacity of sports venue in the mid-Atlantic. In 2002, the name changed to Dover International Speedway from Dover Downs International Speedway after Dover Downs Gaming and Entertainment split, making Dover Motorsports. From 2007 to 2009, the speedway worked on an improvement project called "The Monster Makeover", which expanded facilities at the track and beautified the track. After the 2014 season, the track's capacity was reduced to 95,500 seats.

=== Entry list ===
- (R) denotes rookie driver.

#	Driver	Team	Make	Sponsor
1	Brett Bodine	Ellington Racing	Chevrolet	Bull's-Eye Barbecue Sauce
3	Dale Earnhardt	Richard Childress Racing	Chevrolet	Wrangler
4	Rick Wilson	Morgan–McClure Motorsports	Oldsmobile	Kodak
5	Geoff Bodine	Hendrick Motorsports	Chevrolet	Levi Garrett
6	Rick Knoop	U.S. Racing	Chevrolet	U.S. Racing
7	Alan Kulwicki	AK Racing	Ford	Zerex
8	Bobby Hillin Jr.	Stavola Brothers Racing	Buick	Miller American
9	Bill Elliott	Melling Racing	Ford	Coors
11	Terry Labonte	Junior Johnson & Associates	Chevrolet	Budweiser
12	Larry Caudill	Hamby Racing	Chevrolet	Hamby Racing
15	Ricky Rudd	Bud Moore Engineering	Ford	Motorcraft Quality Parts
17	Darrell Waltrip	Hendrick Motorsports	Chevrolet	Tide
18	Dale Jarrett (R)	Freedlander Motorsports	Chevrolet	Freedlander Financial
21	Kyle Petty	Wood Brothers Racing	Ford	Citgo
22	Bobby Allison	Stavola Brothers Racing	Buick	Miller American
26	Morgan Shepherd	King Racing	Buick	Quaker State
27	Rusty Wallace	Blue Max Racing	Pontiac	Kodiak
28	Davey Allison (R)	Ranier-Lundy Racing	Ford	Texaco, Havoline
29	Cale Yarborough	Cale Yarborough Motorsports	Oldsmobile	Hardee's
30	Michael Waltrip	Bahari Racing	Chevrolet	All Pro Auto Parts
33	Harry Gant	Mach 1 Racing	Chevrolet	Skoal Bandit
35	Benny Parsons	Hendrick Motorsports	Chevrolet	Folgers Decaf
43	Richard Petty	Petty Enterprises	Pontiac	STP
44	Sterling Marlin	Hagan Racing	Oldsmobile	Piedmont Airlines
51	David Simko	Simko Racing	Chevrolet	Metro 25 Car Care Center
52	Jimmy Means	Jimmy Means Racing	Pontiac	Eureka
55	Phil Parsons	Jackson Bros. Motorsports	Oldsmobile	Skoal Classic
62	Steve Christman (R)	Winkle Motorsports	Pontiac	AC Spark Plug
64	Rodney Combs	Langley Racing	Ford	Sunny King Ford
67	Buddy Arrington	Arrington Racing	Ford	Pannill Sweatshirts
70	J. D. McDuffie	McDuffie Racing	Pontiac	Rumple Furniture
71	Dave Marcis	Marcis Auto Racing	Chevrolet	Lifebuoy
72	Eddie Drury (Note: Withdrew after crashing in first round qualifying.)	Drury Racing	Chevrolet	Drury Racing
75	Neil Bonnett	RahMoc Enterprises	Pontiac	Valvoline
80	Eddie Bierschwale	S&H Racing	Chevrolet	S&H Racing
81	Mike Potter	Fillip Racing	Ford	Fillip Racing
82	Rick Jeffrey	Jeffery Racing	Chevrolet	Jeffery Racing
88	Buddy Baker	Baker–Schiff Racing	Oldsmobile	Crisco
90	Ken Schrader	Donlavey Racing	Ford	Red Baron Frozen Pizza
97	D. Wayne Strout	Strout Racing	Oldsmobile	Strout Racing
98	Mark Gibson	Gibson Racing	Pontiac	Gibson Racing

== Qualifying ==
Qualifying was split into two rounds. The first round was held on Saturday, September 19, at 10:00 AM EST. Each driver had one lap to set a time. During the first round, the top 20 drivers in the round were guaranteed a starting spot in the race. If a driver was not able to guarantee a spot in the first round, they had the option to scrub their time from the first round and try and run a faster lap time in a second round qualifying run, held on Saturday, at 3:00 PM EST. As with the first round, each driver had one lap to set a time. For this specific race, positions 21-40 were decided on time, and depending on who needed it, a select amount of positions were given to cars who had not otherwise qualified but were high enough in owner's points; up to two were given.

Alan Kulwicki, driving for his own AK Racing team, managed to win the pole, setting a time of 24.687 and an average speed of 145.826 miles per hour (234.684 km/h) in the first round.

No drivers failed to qualify.

=== Full qualifying results ===
Pos.	#	Driver	Team	Make	Time	Speed
1	7	Alan Kulwicki	AK Racing	Ford	24.687	145.826
2	28	Davey Allison (R)	Ranier-Lundy Racing	Ford	24.749	145.460
3	11	Terry Labonte	Junior Johnson & Associates	Chevrolet	24.804	145.138
4	4	Rick Wilson	Morgan–McClure Motorsports	Oldsmobile	24.884	144.671
5	90	Ken Schrader	Donlavey Racing	Ford	24.931	144.399
6	5	Geoff Bodine	Hendrick Motorsports	Chevrolet	24.958	144.242
7	33	Harry Gant	Mach 1 Racing	Chevrolet	24.963	144.213
8	21	Kyle Petty	Wood Brothers Racing	Ford	25.020	143.885
9	9	Bill Elliott	Melling Racing	Ford	25.034	143.804
10	26	Morgan Shepherd	King Racing	Buick	25.039	143.776
11	44	Sterling Marlin	Hagan Racing	Oldsmobile	25.067	143.615
12	22	Bobby Allison	Stavola Brothers Racing	Buick	25.070	143.598
13	15	Ricky Rudd	Bud Moore Engineering	Ford	25.102	143.415
14	88	Buddy Baker	Baker–Schiff Racing	Oldsmobile	25.130	143.255
15	1	Brett Bodine	Ellington Racing	Chevrolet	25.185	142.942
16	52	Jimmy Means	Jimmy Means Racing	Pontiac	25.264	142.495
17	18	Dale Jarrett (R)	Freedlander Motorsports	Chevrolet	25.289	142.354
18	35	Benny Parsons	Hendrick Motorsports	Chevrolet	25.306	142.259
19	75	Neil Bonnett	RahMoc Enterprises	Pontiac	25.338	142.079
20	27	Rusty Wallace	Blue Max Racing	Pontiac	25.352	142.001
Failed to lock in Round 1
21	55	Phil Parsons	Jackson Bros. Motorsports	Oldsmobile	25.366	141.922
22	3	Dale Earnhardt	Richard Childress Racing	Chevrolet	25.372	141.889
23	17	Darrell Waltrip	Hendrick Motorsports	Chevrolet	25.380	141.844
24	64	Trevor Boys	Langley Racing	Ford	25.458	141.409
25	8	Bobby Hillin Jr.	Stavola Brothers Racing	Buick	25.505	141.149
26	43	Richard Petty	Petty Enterprises	Pontiac	25.589	140.685
27	71	Dave Marcis	Marcis Auto Racing	Chevrolet	25.592	140.669
28	81	Mike Potter	Fillip Racing	Ford	25.791	139.584
29	82	Rick Jeffrey	Jeffery Racing	Chevrolet	25.829	139.378
30	62	Steve Christman (R)	Winkle Motorsports	Pontiac	25.841	139.313
31	67	Buddy Arrington	Arrington Racing	Ford	25.874	139.136
32	98	Mark Gibson	Gibson Racing	Pontiac	25.891	139.044
33	12	Larry Caudill	Hamby Racing	Oldsmobile	25.893	139.034
34	51	David Simko	Simko Racing	Chevrolet	25.970	138.621
35	80	Eddie Bierschwale	S&H Racing	Chevrolet	26.000	138.462
36	6	Rick Knoop	U.S. Racing	Chevrolet	26.235	137.221
37	97	D. Wayne Strout	Strout Racing	Oldsmobile	26.362	136.560
38	70	J. D. McDuffie	McDuffie Racing	Pontiac	26.849	134.083
39	29	Cale Yarborough	Cale Yarborough Motorsports	Oldsmobile	25.210	142.800
40	30	Michael Waltrip	Bahari Racing	Chevrolet	25.238	142.642
Withdrew
WD	72	Eddie Drury	Drury Racing	Chevrolet	-	-
Official starting lineup

== Race results ==
Fin	St	#	Driver	Team	Make	Laps	Led	Status	Pts	Winnings
1	13	15	Ricky Rudd	Bud Moore Engineering	Ford	500	373	running	185	$54,550
2	2	28	Davey Allison (R)	Ranier-Lundy Racing	Ford	500	39	running	175	$25,875
3	19	75	Neil Bonnett	RahMoc Enterprises	Pontiac	500	0	running	165	$21,335
4	9	9	Bill Elliott	Melling Racing	Ford	500	1	running	165	$19,375
5	11	44	Sterling Marlin	Hagan Racing	Oldsmobile	500	6	running	160	$17,620
6	6	5	Geoff Bodine	Hendrick Motorsports	Chevrolet	498	0	running	150	$13,175
7	12	22	Bobby Allison	Stavola Brothers Racing	Buick	498	1	running	146	$12,440
8	14	88	Buddy Baker	Baker–Schiff Racing	Oldsmobile	498	0	running	142	$5,900
9	26	43	Richard Petty	Petty Enterprises	Pontiac	496	0	running	138	$8,575
10	23	17	Darrell Waltrip	Hendrick Motorsports	Chevrolet	495	0	running	134	$7,390
11	5	90	Ken Schrader	Donlavey Racing	Ford	495	0	running	130	$7,355
12	20	27	Rusty Wallace	Blue Max Racing	Pontiac	495	0	running	127	$10,900
13	15	1	Brett Bodine	Ellington Racing	Chevrolet	493	0	running	124	$2,650
14	1	7	Alan Kulwicki	AK Racing	Ford	493	25	running	126	$10,735
15	27	71	Dave Marcis	Marcis Auto Racing	Chevrolet	490	0	running	118	$6,275
16	18	35	Benny Parsons	Hendrick Motorsports	Chevrolet	489	0	running	115	$11,400
17	30	62	Steve Christman (R)	Winkle Motorsports	Pontiac	487	0	running	112	$2,650
18	40	30	Michael Waltrip	Bahari Racing	Chevrolet	486	0	running	109	$5,515
19	31	67	Buddy Arrington	Arrington Racing	Ford	479	0	running	106	$5,255
20	36	6	Rick Knoop	U.S. Racing	Chevrolet	470	0	running	0	$5,595
21	33	12	Larry Caudill	Hamby Racing	Oldsmobile	470	0	running	0	$4,725
22	16	52	Jimmy Means	Jimmy Means Racing	Pontiac	468	0	running	97	$4,665
23	8	21	Kyle Petty	Wood Brothers Racing	Ford	403	0	running	94	$8,850
24	29	82	Rick Jeffrey	Jeffery Racing	Chevrolet	391	0	clutch	91	$1,800
25	7	33	Harry Gant	Mach 1 Racing	Chevrolet	381	0	engine	88	$4,605
26	37	97	D. Wayne Strout	Strout Racing	Oldsmobile	381	0	fatigue	85	$1,700
27	4	4	Rick Wilson	Morgan–McClure Motorsports	Oldsmobile	356	0	distributor	82	$1,650
28	38	70	J. D. McDuffie	McDuffie Racing	Pontiac	335	0	engine	79	$1,600
29	21	55	Phil Parsons	Jackson Bros. Motorsports	Oldsmobile	328	0	running	76	$1,550
30	34	51	David Simko	Simko Racing	Chevrolet	308	0	clutch	73	$1,500
31	22	3	Dale Earnhardt	Richard Childress Racing	Chevrolet	304	18	engine	75	$12,700
32	3	11	Terry Labonte	Junior Johnson & Associates	Chevrolet	295	37	crash	72	$11,050
33	24	64	Trevor Boys	Langley Racing	Ford	281	0	engine	0	$4,085
34	32	98	Mark Gibson	Gibson Racing	Pontiac	204	0	axle	61	$1,300
35	28	81	Mike Potter	Fillip Racing	Ford	185	0	exhaust	58	$1,200
36	39	29	Cale Yarborough	Cale Yarborough Motorsports	Oldsmobile	117	0	engine	55	$1,175
37	35	80	Eddie Bierschwale	S&H Racing	Chevrolet	65	0	engine	52	$1,175
38	17	18	Dale Jarrett (R)	Freedlander Motorsports	Chevrolet	45	0	engine	49	$3,175
39	25	8	Bobby Hillin Jr.	Stavola Brothers Racing	Buick	45	0	crash	46	$8,150
40	10	26	Morgan Shepherd	King Racing	Buick	20	0	engine	43	$3,150
Withdrew
WD		72	Eddie Drury	Drury Racing	Chevrolet					
Official race results

== Standings after the race ==
Drivers' Championship standings

	Pos	Driver	Points
	1	Dale Earnhardt	3,781
	2	Bill Elliott	3,263 (-518)
	3	Terry Labonte	3,091 (-690)
	4	Rusty Wallace	3,069 (–712)
1	5	Ricky Rudd	3,063 (–718)
1	6	Darrell Waltrip	3,032 (–749)
	7	Neil Bonnett	3,007 (–774)
	8	Richard Petty	2,946 (–835)
	9	Kyle Petty	2,866 (–915)
	10	Ken Schrader	2,788 (–993)
Official driver's standings

- Note: Only the first 10 positions are included for the driver standings.

== Notes ==
Previous race: 1987 Wrangler Jeans Indigo 400	NASCAR Winston Cup Series; 1987 season	Next race: 1987 Goody's 500
