= Slick Johnson =

American stock car racing driver

- Born: Julius David Johnson III; February 23, 1948; Florence, South Carolina, U.S.
- Died: February 14, 1990 (aged 41); Daytona Beach, Florida, U.S.
- Cause of death: Basilar skull fracture and crushed chest caused by racing accident

NASCAR Cup Series career
- 68 races run over 8 years
- Best finish: 23rd (1980)
- First race: 1979 Carolina 500 (Rockingham)
- Last race: 1987 Holly Farms 400 (North Wilkesboro)
Wins	Top tens	Poles
0	7	0

NASCAR O'Reilly Auto Parts Series career
- 1 race run over 1 year
- Best finish: 138th (1983)
- First race: 1983 Mello Yello 300 (Charlotte)
Wins	Top tens	Poles
0	0	0

Julius David "Slick" Johnson III (February 23, 1948 – February 14, 1990) was an American stock car racing driver. A veteran of short track competition in the Carolinas, he competed in the NASCAR Winston Cup Series during the 1980s; his best finish in the series, second, came in a non-points consolation race at Daytona International Speedway. He was killed in a racing accident in an ARCA race at Daytona in 1990.

== Career ==
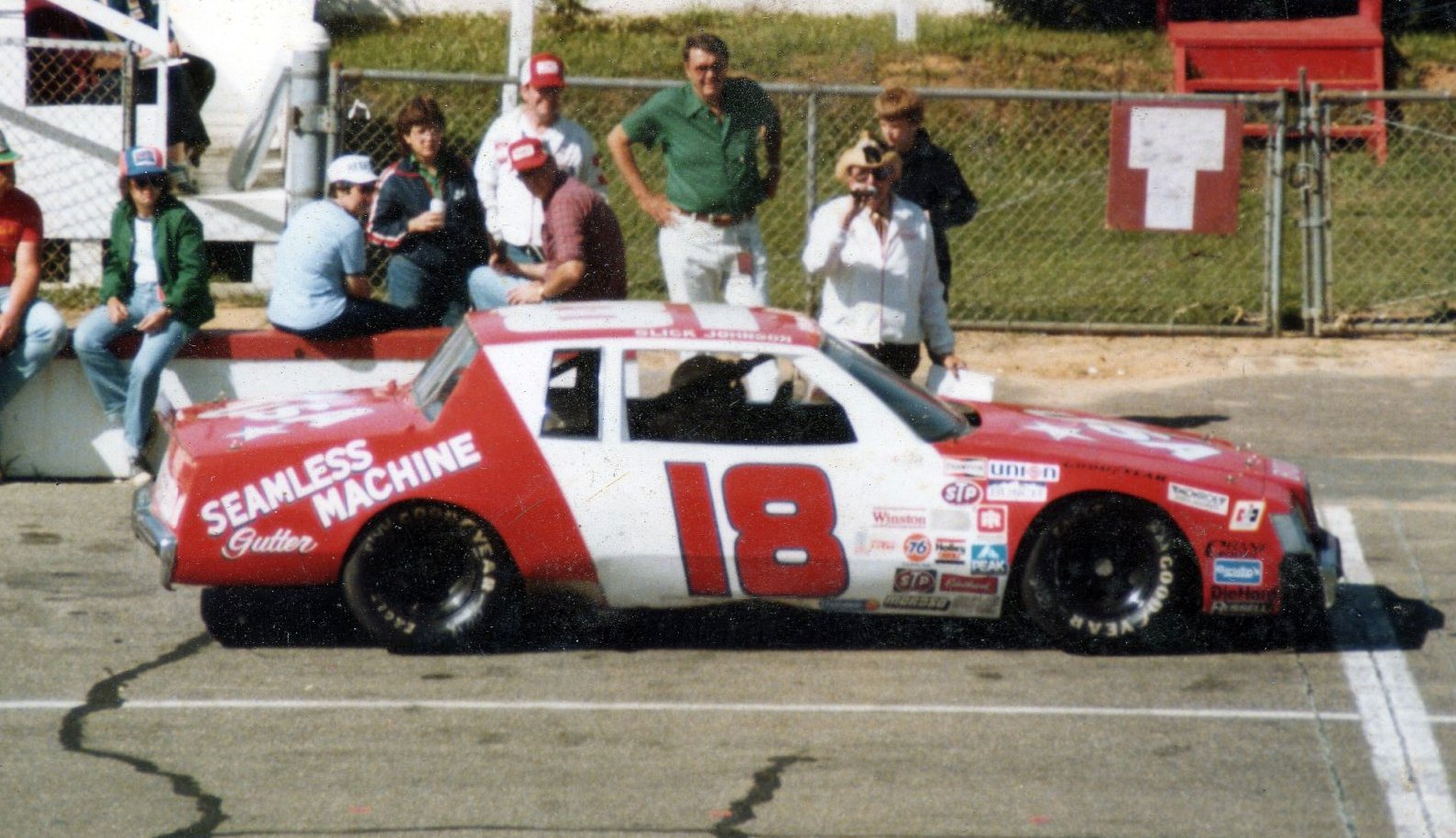
Johnson's 1983 Cup car

A native of Florence, South Carolina, Johnson started his racing career on dirt tracks at the age of sixteen; his racing career was interrupted due to his spending time in the military, however he returned to competition in 1968 at Cooper River Speedway; Johnson also competed at other tracks in the Carolinas during the late 1960s and 1970s including Sumter Speedway.

Moving up from local competition during the 1970s, Johnson made his first start in NASCAR Winston Cup Series competition in 1979 at North Carolina Motor Speedway in Rockingham, North Carolina, finishing 27th in his first race in the series. He would go on to compete in a total of 68 Winston Cup Series races between 1979 and 1987, posting a best finish of eighth on two occasions, both in 1980, at North Wilkesboro Speedway and at Rockingham. Johnson also finished second, to Tim Richmond, in a non-points consolation race for Daytona 500 non-qualifiers at Daytona International Speedway in 1982.

Johnson also competed in a single Budweiser Late Model Sportsman Series race in his career, at Charlotte Motor Speedway in 1983; he started nineteenth and finished 28th in the event.

He was not related to Jimmie Johnson, also Joe Lee Johnson and Junior Johnson

== Death ==
In 1988 at Charlotte Motor Speedway, Johnson was injured in a severe crash during a practice session. Following his recovery, Johnson returned to racing in the ARCA Permatex Super Car Series season-opening 200-mile race at Daytona International Speedway in 1990. Starting last in the forty-car field, Johnson was involved in a crash on the race's 76th lap that left him with a basal skull fracture and crushed chest; Johnson had been hit by three other cars during the course of the accident. Transported to Halifax Medical Center in critical condition, Johnson died three days later; he was the 23rd racing-related fatality at Daytona, and the first stock car driver to be killed since Joe Young in 1987.

The accident in which Johnson was involved, in which paramedic Mike Staley was also injured one lap later, was featured in an episode of Rescue 911 that aired on November 13, 1990 on CBS.

== Motorsports career results ==
=== NASCAR ===
(key) (Bold – Pole position awarded by qualifying time. Italics – Pole position earned by points standings or practice time. * – Most laps led.)

==== Winston Cup Series ====
NASCAR Winston Cup Series results
Year	Team	No.	Make	1	2	3	4	5	6	7	8	9	10	11	12	13	14	15	16	17	18	19	20	21	22	23	24	25	26	27	28	29	30	31	NWCC	Pts	Ref
1979	Satterfield Racing	87	Chevy	RSD	DAY	CAR; 27	RCH	ATL	NWS; 24	BRI	DAR	MAR	TAL	NSV	DOV	CLT	TWS	RSD	MCH	DAY	NSV	POC	TAL	MCH	BRI	DAR	RCH	DOV	MAR	CLT	NWS				42nd	431	
1979	Johnson Racing	51	Chevy																													CAR; 10	ATL; 13	ONT	42nd	431	
1980	Johnson Racing	53	Chevy	RSD	DAY; 14	RCH	CAR; 30	ATL; 10	BRI; 26	DAR; 25	NWS; 9	MAR; 9	TAL	NSV; 25	DOV	CLT; 32	TWS; 30	RSD	MCH	DAY	NSV; 13	POC; 31	TAL; 19	MCH	BRI	DAR; 15	RCH	DOV	NWS; 8	MAR; 24	CLT; 40	CAR; 8	ATL	ONT	23rd	1851	
1981	Johnson Racing	53	Chevy	RSD	DAY	RCH	CAR; 25	ATL; 34	BRI	NWS	DAR; 32	MAR	TAL	NSV	DOV	CLT	TWS	RSD	MCH	DAY	NSV	POC	TAL	MCH	BRI										65th	216	
1981	Ulrich Racing	40	Buick																							DAR; 35	RCH	DOV	MAR	NWS	CLT	CAR	ATL	RSD	65th	216	
1982	Hylton Motorsports	48	Buick	DAY; DNQ				CAR; 18	DAR; 26			TAL; 12																							29th	1261	
1982	Hylton Motorsports	48	Pontiac		RCH; 17	BRI; 21	ATL			NWS; 30	MAR; 10																								29th	1261	
1982	Ulrich Racing	40	Buick										NSV; 25	DOV; 16	CLT; 18	POC; 29	RSD	MCH; 30	DAY; 34	NSV; 28	POC	TAL; 32	MCH	BRI	DAR; 32	RCH	DOV	NWS	CLT; DNQ	MAR	CAR; 19	ATL	RSD		29th	1261	
1983	Billy Matthews Racing	42	Buick	DAY; DNQ																															38th	705	
1983	Satterfield Racing	18	Buick		RCH; 27	CAR; 23	ATL; 34	DAR; 29	NWS; 25	MAR; 28	TAL	NSV	DOV	BRI	CLT; 24	RSD	POC	MCH	DAY	NSV	POC; 37	TAL	MCH	BRI	DAR; 27	RCH	DOV	MAR	NWS	CLT					38th	705	
1983	Cronkrite Racing	96	Chevy																												CAR; 20	ATL	RSD		38th	705	
1984	Jimmy Means Racing	52	Pontiac	DAY	RCH	CAR	ATL	BRI	NWS	DAR	MAR	TAL	NSV	DOV	CLT	RSD	POC	MCH; DNQ	DAY	NSV	POC	TAL	MCH	BRI											NA	0	
1984	Satterfield Racing	18	Chevy																						DAR; 36	RCH	DOV	MAR	CLT	NWS	CAR	ATL	RSD		NA	0	
1985	Gray Racing	31	Chevy	DAY; 20	RCH																														48th	343	
1985	Spohn Racing	05	Ford			CAR; 15	ATL; 21	BRI	DAR; 36	NWS	MAR	TAL; DNQ	DOV	CLT; 17	RSD	POC	MCH	DAY	POC	TAL	MCH	BRI													48th	343	
1985	Spohn Racing	51	Ford																				DAR; 29	RCH	DOV	MAR	NWS	CLT	CAR						48th	343	
1985	Blue Max Racing	27	Pontiac																											ATL; QL^{†}	RSD				48th	343	
1986	Gray Racing	54	Chevy	DAY; QL^{‡}	RCH	CAR	ATL; QL^{‡}	BRI	DAR	NWS	MAR	TAL	DOV	CLT	RSD	POC	MCH	DAY	POC	TAL	GLN	MCH	BRI	DAR	RCH	DOV	MAR	NWS	CLT	CAR	ATL	RSD			NA	-	
1987	Hamby Motorsports	12	Olds	DAY	CAR	RCH; 19	ATL		NWS; 19		MAR; 30																MAR; 25								47th	444	
1987	Hamby Motorsports	12	Chevy					DAR; 12		BRI; 14		TAL; 15	CLT	DOV	POC	RSD	MCH	DAY	POC	TAL	GLN	MCH	BRI	DAR	RCH	DOV									47th	444	
1987	Fillip Racing	81	Ford																									NWS; 32	CLT	CAR	RSD	ATL			47th	444	
1988	Sadler Brothers Racing	95	Chevy	DAY	RCH	CAR	ATL	DAR	BRI	NWS	MAR	TAL	CLT	DOV	RSD	POC	MCH	DAY	POC	TAL; DNQ	GLN	MCH; DNQ	BRI	DAR; DNQ	RCH	DOV	MAR	CLT; DNQ	NWS	CAR	PHO	ATL			NA	-	
^{†} - Qualified but replaced by Tim Richmond · ^{‡} - Qualified but replaced by Eddie Bierschwale

===== Daytona 500 =====
Year	Team	Manufacturer	Start	Finish
1980	Johnson Racing	Chevrolet	39	14
1982	Hylton Motorsports	Buick	DNQ	
1983	Billy Matthews Racing	Buick	DNQ	
1985	Gray Racing	Chevrolet	40	20
1986	Gray Racing	Chevrolet	QL^{†}	
^{†} - Qualified but replaced by Eddie Bierschwale

==== Late Model Sportsman Series ====
NASCAR Late Model Sportsman Series results
Year	Team	No.	Make	1	2	3	4	5	6	7	8	9	10	11	12	13	14	15	16	17	18	19	20	21	22	23	24	25	26	27	28	29	30	31	32	33	34	35	NLMSC	Pts	Ref
1983		46	Buick	DAY	RCH	CAR	HCY	MAR	NWS	SBO	GPS	LGY	DOV	BRI	CLT; 28	SBO	HCY	ROU	SBO	ROU	CRW	ROU	SBO	HCY	LGY	IRP	GPS	BRI	HCY	DAR	RCH	NWS	SBO	MAR	ROU	CLT	HCY	MAR	138th	79	

=== ARCA Permatex SuperCar Series ===
(key) (Bold – Pole position awarded by qualifying time. Italics – Pole position earned by points standings or practice time. * – Most laps led.)

ARCA Permatex SuperCar Series results
Year	Team	No.	Make	1	2	3	4	5	6	7	8	9	10	11	12	13	14	15	16	17	18	19	20	APSC	Pts	Ref
1983	Satterfield Racing	81	Buick	DAY	NSV	TAL	LPR	LPR	ISF	IRP	SSP	FRS	BFS	WIN	LPR	POC	TAL; 8	MCS	FRS	MIL	DSF	ZAN	SND	NA	0	
1989	Sadler Brothers Racing	95	Chevy	DAY	ATL	KIL	TAL	FRS	POC	KIL	HAG	POC	TAL	DEL	FRS	ISF	TOL	DSF	SLM	ATL; 10				108th	-	
1990	Sadler Brothers Racing	95	Pontiac	DAY; 17	ATL	KIL	TAL	FRS	POC	KIL	TOL	HAG	POC	TAL	MCH	ISF	TOL	DSF	WIN	DEL	ATL			102nd	-	
