= 1987 Goody's 500 =

24th race of the 1987 NASCAR Winston Cup Series

Race details
- Race 24 of 29 in the 1987 NASCAR Winston Cup Series
- The 1987 Goody's 500 program cover, featuring Richard Petty.
- Date: September 27, 1987
- Official name: 39th Annual Goody's 500
- Location: Ridgeway, Virginia, Martinsville Speedway
- Course: Permanent racing facility
- Course length: 0.526 miles (0.847 km)
- Distance: 500 laps, 263 mi (423.257 km)
- Average speed: 76.41 miles per hour (122.97 km/h)
- Attendance: 41,000

Pole position
Driver	Geoff Bodine	Hendrick Motorsports
- Time: 20.759

Most laps led
Driver	Dale Earnhardt	Richard Childress Racing
- Laps: 170

Winner
No. 17	Darrell Waltrip	Hendrick Motorsports

Television in the United States
- Network: SETN
- Announcers: Eli Gold, Jerry Punch

Radio in the United States
- Radio: Motor Racing Network

The 1987 Goody's 500 was the 24th stock car race of the 1987 NASCAR Winston Cup Series season and the 39th iteration of the event. The race was held on Sunday, September 27, 1987, before an audience of 41,000 in Martinsville, Virginia at Martinsville Speedway, a 0.526 miles (0.847 km) permanent oval-shaped short track. The race took the scheduled 500 laps to complete.

Heading into the final lap of the race, the three cars of Hendrick Motorsports' Darrell Waltrip, Richard Childress Racing's Dale Earnhardt, and Junior Johnson & Associates' Terry Labonte engaged in a battle for the victory. Heading into the final two turns of the race, Waltrip bumped into the bumper of Labonte's car, sending Labonte out of control. Labonte hit Earnhardt's car, letting Waltrip pass the two of them to take his 71st career NASCAR Winston Cup Series victory and his only victory of the season. To fill out the top three, the aforementioned Earnhardt and Labonte finished second and third, respectively.

== Background ==
The layout of Martinsville Speedway, the venue where the race was held.

Martinsville Speedway is a NASCAR-owned stock car racing track located in Henry County, in Ridgeway, Virginia, just to the south of Martinsville. At 0.526 miles (0.847 km) in length, it is the shortest track in the NASCAR Cup Series. The track was also one of the first paved oval tracks in NASCAR, being built in 1947 by H. Clay Earles. It is also the only remaining race track that has been on the NASCAR circuit from its beginning in 1948.

=== Entry list ===
- (R) denotes rookie driver.

#	Driver	Team	Make	Sponsor
3	Dale Earnhardt	Richard Childress Racing	Chevrolet	Wrangler
5	Geoff Bodine	Hendrick Motorsports	Chevrolet	Levi Garrett
6	Ernie Irvan	U.S. Racing	Chevrolet	U.S. Racing
7	Alan Kulwicki	AK Racing	Ford	Zerex
8	Bobby Hillin Jr.	Stavola Brothers Racing	Buick	Miller American
9	Bill Elliott	Melling Racing	Ford	Coors
11	Terry Labonte	Junior Johnson & Associates	Chevrolet	Budweiser
12	Slick Johnson	Hamby Racing	Oldsmobile	Hamby Racing
15	Ricky Rudd	Bud Moore Engineering	Ford	Motorcraft Quality Parts
17	Darrell Waltrip	Hendrick Motorsports	Chevrolet	Tide
18	Dale Jarrett (R)	Freedlander Motorsports	Chevrolet	Freedlander Financial
21	Kyle Petty	Wood Brothers Racing	Ford	Citgo
22	Bobby Allison	Stavola Brothers Racing	Buick	Miller American
26	Morgan Shepherd	King Racing	Buick	Quaker State
27	Rusty Wallace	Blue Max Racing	Pontiac	Kodiak
30	Michael Waltrip	Bahari Racing	Chevrolet	All Pro Auto Parts
33	Harry Gant	Mach 1 Racing	Chevrolet	Skoal Bandit
35	Benny Parsons	Hendrick Motorsports	Chevrolet	Folgers Decaf
43	Richard Petty	Petty Enterprises	Pontiac	STP
44	Sterling Marlin	Hagan Racing	Oldsmobile	Piedmont Airlines
50	Greg Sacks	Dingman Brothers Racing	Pontiac	Valvoline
52	Jimmy Means	Jimmy Means Racing	Pontiac	Eureka
55	Phil Parsons	Jackson Bros. Motorsports	Oldsmobile	Skoal Classic
62	Steve Christman (R)	Winkle Motorsports	Pontiac	AC Spark Plug
64	Trevor Boys	Langley Racing	Ford	Sunny King Ford
67	Buddy Arrington	Arrington Racing	Ford	Pannill Sweatshirts
70	J. D. McDuffie	McDuffie Racing	Pontiac	Rumple Furniture
71	Dave Marcis	Marcis Auto Racing	Chevrolet	Lifebuoy
75	Neil Bonnett	RahMoc Enterprises	Pontiac	Valvoline
88	Bryan Baker (Note: Bryan was unable to qualify the car in qualifying. As Bryan was a rookie, he was not allowed to start the car with an owner's points provisional. As a result, his father, Buddy Baker, replaced him for the race.)	Baker–Schiff Racing	Oldsmobile	Crisco
90	Ken Schrader	Donlavey Racing	Ford	Red Baron Frozen Pizza

== Qualifying ==
Qualifying was split into two rounds. The first round was held on Thursday, September 24, at 2:00 PM EST. Each driver had one lap to set a time. During the first round, the top 20 drivers in the round were guaranteed a starting spot in the race. If a driver was not able to guarantee a spot in the first round, they had the option to scrub their time from the first round and try and run a faster lap time in a second round qualifying run, held on Friday, September 25, at 1:30 PM EST. As with the first round, each driver had one lap to set a time. For this specific race, positions 21-30 were decided on time, and depending on who needed it, a select amount of positions were given to cars who had not otherwise qualified but were high enough in owner's points; up to two were given.

Geoff Bodine, driving for Hendrick Motorsports, managed to win the pole, setting a time of 20.759 and an average speed of 91.218 miles per hour (146.801 km/h) in the first round.

No drivers failed to qualify.

=== Full qualifying results ===
Pos.	#	Driver	Team	Make	Time	Speed
1	5	Geoff Bodine	Hendrick Motorsports	Chevrolet	20.759	91.218
2	26	Morgan Shepherd	King Racing	Buick	20.837	90.877
3	11	Terry Labonte	Junior Johnson & Associates	Chevrolet	20.854	90.803
4	75	Neil Bonnett	RahMoc Enterprises	Pontiac	20.860	90.777
5	8	Bobby Hillin Jr.	Stavola Brothers Racing	Buick	20.880	90.690
6	21	Kyle Petty	Wood Brothers Racing	Ford	20.885	90.668
7	33	Harry Gant	Mach 1 Racing	Chevrolet	20.892	90.638
8	3	Dale Earnhardt	Richard Childress Racing	Chevrolet	20.902	90.594
9	71	Dave Marcis	Marcis Auto Racing	Chevrolet	20.917	90.529
10	18	Dale Jarrett (R)	Freedlander Motorsports	Chevrolet	20.929	90.477
11	90	Ken Schrader	Donlavey Racing	Ford	20.938	90.438
12	27	Rusty Wallace	Blue Max Racing	Pontiac	20.942	90.421
13	9	Bill Elliott	Melling Racing	Ford	20.945	90.408
14	17	Darrell Waltrip	Hendrick Motorsports	Chevrolet	20.954	90.369
15	15	Ricky Rudd	Bud Moore Engineering	Ford	20.961	90.339
16	43	Richard Petty	Petty Enterprises	Pontiac	20.991	90.210
17	22	Bobby Allison	Stavola Brothers Racing	Buick	21.024	90.068
18	35	Benny Parsons	Hendrick Motorsports	Chevrolet	21.068	89.880
19	50	Greg Sacks	Dingman Brothers Racing	Pontiac	21.075	89.851
20	30	Michael Waltrip	Bahari Racing	Chevrolet	21.076	89.846
Failed to lock in Round 1
21	55	Phil Parsons	Jackson Bros. Motorsports	Oldsmobile	21.099	89.748
22	7	Alan Kulwicki	AK Racing	Ford	21.121	89.655
23	44	Sterling Marlin	Hagan Racing	Oldsmobile	21.137	89.587
24	6	Ernie Irvan	U.S. Racing	Chevrolet	21.197	89.333
25	67	Buddy Arrington	Arrington Racing	Ford	21.215	89.258
26	64	Curtis Markham	Langley Racing	Ford	21.225	89.216
27	70	J. D. McDuffie	McDuffie Racing	Pontiac	21.297	88.914
28	62	Steve Christman (R)	Winkle Motorsports	Pontiac	21.362	88.643
29	12	Slick Johnson	Hamby Racing	Oldsmobile	21.404	88.469
30	52	Jimmy Means	Jimmy Means Racing	Pontiac	21.416	88.420
Provisional
31	88	Buddy Baker	Baker–Schiff Racing	Oldsmobile	-	-
Official first round qualifying results
Official starting lineup

== Race results ==
Fin	St	#	Driver	Team	Make	Laps	Led	Status	Pts	Winnings
1	14	17	Darrell Waltrip	Hendrick Motorsports	Chevrolet	500	138	running	180	$43,830
2	8	3	Dale Earnhardt	Richard Childress Racing	Chevrolet	500	170	running	180	$29,875
3	3	11	Terry Labonte	Junior Johnson & Associates	Chevrolet	500	119	running	170	$23,950
4	4	75	Neil Bonnett	RahMoc Enterprises	Pontiac	498	0	running	160	$13,005
5	2	26	Morgan Shepherd	King Racing	Buick	497	0	running	155	$12,335
6	22	7	Alan Kulwicki	AK Racing	Ford	497	0	running	150	$10,500
7	23	44	Sterling Marlin	Hagan Racing	Oldsmobile	496	0	running	146	$7,280
8	17	22	Bobby Allison	Stavola Brothers Racing	Buick	495	1	running	147	$8,550
9	6	21	Kyle Petty	Wood Brothers Racing	Ford	492	0	running	138	$9,000
10	10	18	Dale Jarrett (R)	Freedlander Motorsports	Chevrolet	492	0	running	134	$8,345
11	13	9	Bill Elliott	Melling Racing	Ford	491	0	running	130	$9,770
12	11	90	Ken Schrader	Donlavey Racing	Ford	491	0	running	127	$5,230
13	16	43	Richard Petty	Petty Enterprises	Pontiac	484	0	running	124	$4,720
14	7	33	Harry Gant	Mach 1 Racing	Chevrolet	478	0	oil pressure	121	$5,210
15	24	6	Ernie Irvan	U.S. Racing	Chevrolet	471	0	running	0	$4,600
16	21	55	Phil Parsons	Jackson Bros. Motorsports	Oldsmobile	469	0	running	115	$1,650
17	27	70	J. D. McDuffie	McDuffie Racing	Pontiac	458	0	running	112	$1,580
18	20	30	Michael Waltrip	Bahari Racing	Chevrolet	443	0	running	109	$3,745
19	28	62	Steve Christman (R)	Winkle Motorsports	Pontiac	426	0	running	106	$1,525
20	1	5	Geoff Bodine	Hendrick Motorsports	Chevrolet	392	71	running	108	$13,500
21	15	15	Ricky Rudd	Bud Moore Engineering	Ford	387	1	overheating	105	$8,800
22	5	8	Bobby Hillin Jr.	Stavola Brothers Racing	Buick	368	0	crash	97	$8,055
23	18	35	Benny Parsons	Hendrick Motorsports	Chevrolet	242	0	differential	94	$9,220
24	19	50	Greg Sacks	Dingman Brothers Racing	Pontiac	238	0	differential	91	$1,295
25	29	12	Slick Johnson	Hamby Racing	Oldsmobile	219	0	engine	0	$3,555
26	26	64	Curtis Markham	Langley Racing	Ford	203	0	overheating	0	$3,420
27	9	71	Dave Marcis	Marcis Auto Racing	Chevrolet	187	0	engine	82	$3,885
28	12	27	Rusty Wallace	Blue Max Racing	Pontiac	162	0	engine	79	$8,200
29	25	67	Buddy Arrington	Arrington Racing	Ford	87	0	overheating	76	$2,675
30	30	52	Jimmy Means	Jimmy Means Racing	Pontiac	70	0	crash	73	$2,660
31	31	88	Buddy Baker	Baker–Schiff Racing	Oldsmobile	39	0	brakes	70	$1,160
Official race results

== Standings after the race ==
Drivers' Championship standings

	Pos	Driver	Points
	1	Dale Earnhardt	3,961
	2	Bill Elliott	3,393 (-568)
	3	Terry Labonte	3,261 (-700)
2	4	Darrell Waltrip	3,212 (–749)
	5	Ricky Rudd	3,168 (–793)
1	6	Neil Bonnett	3,167 (–794)
3	7	Rusty Wallace	3,148 (–813)
	8	Richard Petty	3,070 (–891)
	9	Kyle Petty	3,004 (–957)
	10	Ken Schrader	2,915 (–1,046)
Official driver's standings

- Note: Only the first 10 positions are included for the driver standings.

== Notes ==
Previous race: 1987 Delaware 500	NASCAR Winston Cup Series; 1987 season	Next race: 1987 Holly Farms 400
