= 1987 Holly Farms 400 =

25th race of the 1987 NASCAR Winston Cup Series

Race details
- Race 25 of 29 in the 1987 NASCAR Winston Cup Series
- The 1987 Holly Farms 400 program cover, featuring Darrell Waltrip and Junior Johnson.
- Date: October 4, 1987
- Official name: 38th Annual Holly Farms 400
- Location: North Wilkesboro Speedway, North Wilkesboro, North Carolina
- Course: Permanent racing facility
- Course length: 0.625 miles (1.006 km)
- Distance: 400 laps, 250 mi (402.336 km)
- Average speed: 96.051 miles per hour (154.579 km/h)
- Attendance: 32,500

Pole position
Driver	Bill Elliott	Melling Racing
- Time: 19.532

Most laps led
Driver	Terry Labonte	Junior Johnson & Associates
- Laps: 207

Winner
No. 11	Terry Labonte	Junior Johnson & Associates

Television in the United States
- Network: ESPN
- Announcers: Bob Jenkins, Jerry Punch

Radio in the United States
- Radio: Motor Racing Network

The 1987 Holly Farms 400 was the 25th stock car race of the 1987 NASCAR Winston Cup Series season and the 38th iteration of the event. The race was held on Sunday, October 4, 1987, before an audience of 32,500 in North Wilkesboro, North Carolina at the North Wilkesboro Speedway, a 0.625 miles (1.006 km) oval short track. The race took the scheduled 400 laps to complete.

With the help of a final fast pit stop late in the race, Junior Johnson & Associates' Terry Labonte managed to pull away from second-place Dale Earnhardt, completing a dominant run where Labonte led the final 207 laps. The victory was Labonte's eighth career NASCAR Winston Cup Series victory and his only victory of the season.

Heading into the next four races of the season, Dale Earnhardt, who at this point had a 573 point lead in the driver's championship over Bill Elliott, was slated as the lock-in for the championship, only needing a 40th or better place finish in the next four races to clinch the championship.

== Background ==
The layout of North Wilkesboro Speedway, the venue where the race was held

North Wilkesboro Speedway is a short oval racetrack located on U.S. Route 421, about five miles east of the town of North Wilkesboro, North Carolina, or 80 miles north of Charlotte. It measures 0.625 mi (1.006 km) and features a unique uphill backstretch and downhill frontstretch. It has previously held races in NASCAR's top three series, including 93 Winston Cup Series races. The track, a NASCAR original, operated from 1949, NASCAR's inception, until the track's original closure in 1996. The speedway briefly reopened in 2010 and hosted several stock car series races before closing again in the spring of 2011. It was re-opened in August 2022 for grassroots racing.

=== Entry list ===
- (R) denotes rookie driver.

#	Driver	Team	Make	Sponsor
02	Jed Doggett	Doggett Racing	Pontiac	Doggett Racing
3	Dale Earnhardt	Richard Childress Racing	Chevrolet	Wrangler
04	Clark James	James Racing	Pontiac	James Racing
5	Geoff Bodine	Hendrick Motorsports	Chevrolet	Levi Garrett
6	Ernie Irvan	U.S. Racing	Chevrolet	U.S. Racing
7	Alan Kulwicki	AK Racing	Ford	Zerex
8	Bobby Hillin Jr.	Stavola Brothers Racing	Buick	Miller American
9	Bill Elliott	Melling Racing	Ford	Coors
11	Terry Labonte	Junior Johnson & Associates	Chevrolet	Budweiser
12	Larry Pollard	Hamby Racing	Chevrolet	Hamby Racing
15	Ricky Rudd	Bud Moore Engineering	Ford	Motorcraft Quality Parts
17	Darrell Waltrip	Hendrick Motorsports	Chevrolet	Tide
18	Dale Jarrett (R)	Freedlander Motorsports	Chevrolet	Coats & Clark
21	Kyle Petty	Wood Brothers Racing	Ford	Citgo
22	Bobby Allison	Stavola Brothers Racing	Buick	Miller American
26	Morgan Shepherd	King Racing	Buick	Quaker State
27	Rusty Wallace	Blue Max Racing	Pontiac	Kodiak
28	Davey Allison (R)	Ranier-Lundy Racing	Ford	Texaco, Havoline
30	Michael Waltrip	Bahari Racing	Chevrolet	All Pro Auto Parts
33	Harry Gant	Mach 1 Racing	Chevrolet	Skoal Bandit
35	Benny Parsons	Hendrick Motorsports	Chevrolet	Folgers Decaf
36	Joe Dan Bailey	Bailey Racing	Pontiac	Almeda Auto Parts
38	Ronnie Adams	Adams Racing	Chevrolet	Adams Racing
41	Ronnie Thomas	Ronnie Thomas Racing	Chevrolet	Busch Enterprises
43	Richard Petty	Petty Enterprises	Pontiac	STP
44	Sterling Marlin	Hagan Racing	Oldsmobile	Piedmont Airlines
46	Glenn Moffat	Moffat Racing	Chevrolet	Moffat Racing
52	Jimmy Means	Jimmy Means Racing	Pontiac	Eureka
54	Kevin Evans	Gray Racing	Chevrolet	Gray Racing
55	Phil Parsons	Jackson Bros. Motorsports	Oldsmobile	Skoal Classic
62	Steve Christman (R)	Winkle Motorsports	Pontiac	AC Spark Plug
64	Rodney Combs (Note: For unknown reasons, driver changed to Trevor Boys.)	Langley Racing	Ford	Sunny King Ford
67	Buddy Arrington	Arrington Racing	Ford	Pannill Sweatshirts
70	J. D. McDuffie	McDuffie Racing	Pontiac	Rumple Furniture
71	Dave Marcis	Marcis Auto Racing	Chevrolet	Lifebuoy
75	Neil Bonnett	RahMoc Enterprises	Pontiac	Valvoline
76	Hut Stricklin	Jaehne Motorsports	Oldsmobile	Jaehne Motorsports
76	Graham Taylor	Betty Taylor Racing	Ford	Betty Taylor Racing
81	Larry Caudill (Note: For unknown reasons, driver changed to Slick Johnson.)	Fillip Racing	Ford	Fillip Racing
85	Bobby Gerhart	Bobby Gerhart Racing	Chevrolet	J. Omar Landis Enterprises
88	Brandon Baker	Baker–Schiff Racing	Chevrolet	Crisco
90	Ken Schrader	Donlavey Racing	Ford	Red Baron Frozen Pizza
97	D. Wayne Strout	Strout Racing	Oldsmobile	Strout Racing
98	Lynn Gibson	Gibson Racing	Pontiac	Gibson Racing

== Qualifying ==
Qualifying was split into two rounds. The first round was held on Friday, October 2, at 4:30 PM EST. Each driver had one lap to set a time. During the first round, the top 10 drivers in the round were guaranteed a starting spot in the race. If a driver was not able to guarantee a spot in the first round, they had the option to scrub their time from the first round and try and run a faster lap time in a second round qualifying run, held on Saturday, October 3, at 12:15 PM EST. As with the first round, each driver had one lap to set a time. For this specific race, positions 11-30 were decided on time, and depending on who needed it, a select amount of positions were given to cars who had not otherwise qualified but were high enough in owner's points; up to two were given.

Bill Elliott, driving for Melling Racing, managed to win the pole, setting a time of 19.532 and an average speed of 115.196 miles per hour (185.390 km/h) in the first round.

12 drivers failed to qualify.

=== Full qualifying results ===
Pos.	#	Driver	Team	Make	Time	Speed
1	9	Bill Elliott	Melling Racing	Ford	19.532	115.196
2	17	Darrell Waltrip	Hendrick Motorsports	Chevrolet	19.565	115.001
3	35	Benny Parsons	Hendrick Motorsports	Chevrolet	19.585	114.884
4	11	Terry Labonte	Junior Johnson & Associates	Chevrolet	19.597	114.813
5	7	Alan Kulwicki	AK Racing	Ford	19.598	114.808
6	90	Ken Schrader	Donlavey Racing	Ford	19.659	114.451
7	30	Michael Waltrip	Bahari Racing	Chevrolet	19.696	114.236
8	22	Bobby Allison	Stavola Brothers Racing	Buick	19.727	114.057
9	26	Morgan Shepherd	King Racing	Buick	19.741	113.976
10	3	Dale Earnhardt	Richard Childress Racing	Chevrolet	19.745	113.953
Failed to lock in Round 1
11	21	Kyle Petty	Wood Brothers Racing	Ford	19.719	114.103
12	15	Ricky Rudd	Bud Moore Engineering	Ford	19.759	113.872
13	67	Buddy Arrington	Arrington Racing	Ford	19.784	113.728
14	18	Dale Jarrett (R)	Freedlander Motorsports	Chevrolet	19.791	113.688
15	75	Neil Bonnett	RahMoc Enterprises	Pontiac	19.801	113.631
16	44	Sterling Marlin	Hagan Racing	Oldsmobile	19.821	113.516
17	55	Phil Parsons	Jackson Bros. Motorsports	Oldsmobile	19.837	113.424
18	5	Geoff Bodine	Hendrick Motorsports	Chevrolet	19.852	113.339
19	43	Richard Petty	Petty Enterprises	Pontiac	19.858	113.304
20	27	Rusty Wallace	Blue Max Racing	Pontiac	19.858	113.304
21	71	Dave Marcis	Marcis Auto Racing	Chevrolet	19.870	113.236
22	28	Davey Allison	Ranier-Lundy Racing	Ford	19.883	113.162
23	33	Harry Gant	Mach 1 Racing	Chevrolet	19.894	113.099
24	76	Hut Stricklin	Jaehne Motorsports	Oldsmobile	19.975	112.641
25	6	Ernie Irvan	U.S. Racing	Chevrolet	20.007	112.461
26	12	Larry Pollard	Hamby Racing	Chevrolet	20.015	112.416
27	8	Bobby Hillin Jr.	Stavola Brothers Racing	Buick	20.035	112.303
28	52	Jimmy Means	Jimmy Means Racing	Pontiac	20.048	112.231
29	81	Larry Caudill	Fillip Racing	Ford	20.073	112.091
30	41	Ronnie Thomas	Ronnie Thomas Racing	Chevrolet	20.080	112.052
Provisionals
31	62	Steve Christman (R)	Winkle Motorsports	Pontiac	20.080	112.052
32	64	Trevor Boys	Langley Racing	Ford	20.097	111.957
Failed to qualify
33	85	Bobby Gerhart	Bobby Gerhart Racing	Chevrolet	20.193	111.425
34	04	Clark James	James Racing	Pontiac	20.293	110.876
35	54	Kevin Evans	Gray Racing	Chevrolet	20.316	110.750
36	36	Joe Dan Bailey	Bailey Racing	Pontiac	20.364	110.489
37	70	J. D. McDuffie	McDuffie Racing	Pontiac	20.484	109.842
38	97	D. Wayne Strout	Strout Racing	Oldsmobile	20.518	109.660
39	38	Ronnie Adams	Adams Racing	Chevrolet	20.959	107.352
40	88	Brandon Baker	Baker–Schiff Racing	Chevrolet	21.023	107.026
41	98	Lynn Gibson	Gibson Racing	Pontiac	21.188	106.192
42	76	Graham Taylor	Betty Taylor Racing	Ford	21.202	106.122
43	46	Glenn Moffat	Moffat Racing	Chevrolet	21.329	105.490
44	02	Jed Doggett	Doggett Racing	Pontiac	-	-
Official first round qualifying results
Official starting lineup

== Race results ==
Fin	St	#	Driver	Team	Make	Laps	Led	Status	Pts	Winnings
1	4	11	Terry Labonte	Junior Johnson & Associates	Chevrolet	400	207	running	185	$45,575
2	10	3	Dale Earnhardt	Richard Childress Racing	Chevrolet	400	137	running	175	$26,950
3	1	9	Bill Elliott	Melling Racing	Ford	399	39	running	170	$25,450
4	9	26	Morgan Shepherd	King Racing	Buick	398	0	running	160	$11,205
5	18	5	Geoff Bodine	Hendrick Motorsports	Chevrolet	398	11	running	160	$11,975
6	11	21	Kyle Petty	Wood Brothers Racing	Ford	398	0	running	150	$9,425
7	5	7	Alan Kulwicki	AK Racing	Ford	398	0	running	146	$9,305
8	27	8	Bobby Hillin Jr.	Stavola Brothers Racing	Buick	397	0	running	142	$7,980
9	19	43	Richard Petty	Petty Enterprises	Pontiac	397	0	running	138	$5,310
10	20	27	Rusty Wallace	Blue Max Racing	Pontiac	397	0	running	134	$9,975
11	15	75	Neil Bonnett	RahMoc Enterprises	Pontiac	397	0	running	130	$4,995
12	2	17	Darrell Waltrip	Hendrick Motorsports	Chevrolet	397	0	running	127	$3,325
13	12	15	Ricky Rudd	Bud Moore Engineering	Ford	397	0	running	124	$8,720
14	17	55	Phil Parsons	Jackson Bros. Motorsports	Oldsmobile	397	0	running	121	$2,565
15	6	90	Ken Schrader	Donlavey Racing	Ford	396	0	running	118	$4,910
16	7	30	Michael Waltrip	Bahari Racing	Chevrolet	395	0	running	115	$4,355
17	8	22	Bobby Allison	Stavola Brothers Racing	Buick	394	0	running	112	$7,170
18	14	18	Dale Jarrett (R)	Freedlander Motorsports	Chevrolet	394	0	running	109	$4,995
19	3	35	Benny Parsons	Hendrick Motorsports	Chevrolet	394	0	running	106	$9,320
20	16	44	Sterling Marlin	Hagan Racing	Oldsmobile	393	0	running	103	$4,610
21	28	52	Jimmy Means	Jimmy Means Racing	Pontiac	389	0	running	100	$3,830
22	25	6	Ernie Irvan	U.S. Racing	Chevrolet	387	0	running	0	$3,515
23	26	12	Larry Pollard	Hamby Racing	Chevrolet	386	0	running	0	$3,480
24	32	64	Trevor Boys	Langley Racing	Ford	386	0	running	0	$3,445
25	30	41	Ronnie Thomas	Ronnie Thomas Racing	Chevrolet	381	0	running	88	$1,300
26	22	28	Davey Allison	Ranier-Lundy Racing	Ford	367	0	running	85	$1,175
27	13	67	Buddy Arrington	Arrington Racing	Ford	265	0	engine	82	$3,410
28	24	76	Hut Stricklin	Jaehne Motorsports	Oldsmobile	207	0	crash	79	$1,925
29	31	62	Steve Christman (R)	Winkle Motorsports	Pontiac	202	0	engine	76	$1,100
30	21	71	Dave Marcis	Marcis Auto Racing	Chevrolet	198	6	engine	78	$2,625
31	23	33	Harry Gant	Mach 1 Racing	Chevrolet	24	0	differential	70	$2,575
32	29	81	Slick Johnson	Fillip Racing	Ford	11	0	engine	0	$1,125
Failed to qualify
33		85	Bobby Gerhart	Bobby Gerhart Racing	Chevrolet					
34		04	Clark James	James Racing	Pontiac					
35		54	Kevin Evans	Gray Racing	Chevrolet					
36		36	Joe Dan Bailey	Bailey Racing	Pontiac					
37		70	J. D. McDuffie	McDuffie Racing	Pontiac					
38		97	D. Wayne Strout	Strout Racing	Oldsmobile					
39		38	Ronnie Adams	Adams Racing	Chevrolet					
40		88	Brandon Baker	Baker–Schiff Racing	Chevrolet					
41		98	Lynn Gibson	Gibson Racing	Pontiac					
42		76	Graham Taylor	Betty Taylor Racing	Ford					
43		46	Glenn Moffat	Moffat Racing	Chevrolet					
44		02	Jed Doggett	Doggett Racing	Pontiac					
Official race results

== Standings after the race ==
Drivers' Championship standings

	Pos	Driver	Points
	1	Dale Earnhardt	4,136
	2	Bill Elliott	3,563 (-573)
	3	Terry Labonte	3,446 (-690)
	4	Darrell Waltrip	3,339 (–797)
1	5	Neil Bonnett	3,297 (–839)
1	6	Ricky Rudd	3,292 (–844)
	7	Rusty Wallace	3,282 (–854)
	8	Richard Petty	3,208 (–928)
	9	Kyle Petty	3,154 (–982)
	10	Ken Schrader	3,033 (–1,103)
Official driver's standings

- Note: Only the first 10 positions are included for the driver standings.

== Notes ==
Previous race: 1987 Goody's 500	NASCAR Winston Cup Series; 1987 season	Next race: 1987 Oakwood Homes 500
