= 1988 Pannill Sweatshirts 500 =

Eighth race of the 1988 NASCAR Winston Cup Series

Race details
- Race 8 of 29 in the 1988 NASCAR Winston Cup Series
- The 1988 Pannill Sweatshirts 500 program cover.
- Date: April 24, 1988
- Official name: 39th Annual Pannill Sweatshirts 500
- Location: Martinsville, Virginia, Martinsville Speedway
- Course: Permanent racing facility
- Course length: 0.526 miles (0.847 km)
- Distance: 500 laps, 263 mi (423.257 km)
- Average speed: 74.74 miles per hour (120.28 km/h)
- Attendance: 42,000

Pole position
Driver	Ricky Rudd	King Racing
- Time: 20.734

Most laps led
Driver	Dale Earnhardt	Richard Childress Racing
- Laps: 182

Winner
No. 3	Dale Earnhardt	Richard Childress Racing

Television in the United States
- Network: SETN
- Announcers: Eli Gold, Jerry Punch

Radio in the United States
- Radio: Motor Racing Network

The 1988 Pannill Sweatshirts 500 was the eighth stock car race of the 1988 NASCAR Winston Cup Series season and the 39th iteration of the event. The race was held on Sunday, April 24, 1988, before an audience of 42,000 in Martinsville, Virginia at Martinsville Speedway, a 0.526 miles (0.847 km) permanent oval-shaped short track. The race took the scheduled 500 laps to complete. At race's end, Richard Childress Racing driver Dale Earnhardt would manage to dominate the latter stages of the race, leading the final 182 laps to take his 33rd career NASCAR Winston Cup Series victory and his second victory of the season. To fill out the top three, Hagan Racing driver Sterling Marlin and Stavola Brothers Racing driver Bobby Hillin Jr. would finish second and third, respectively.

== Background ==
The layout of Martinsville Speedway, the venue where the race was held.

Martinsville Speedway is a NASCAR-owned stock car racing track located in Henry County, in Ridgeway, Virginia, just to the south of Martinsville. At 0.526 miles (0.847 km) in length, it is the shortest track in the NASCAR Cup Series. The track was also one of the first paved oval tracks in NASCAR, being built in 1947 by H. Clay Earles. It is also the only remaining race track that has been on the NASCAR circuit from its beginning in 1948.

=== Entry list ===
- (R) denotes rookie driver.

#	Driver	Team	Make	Sponsor
00	Gary Brooks	Brooks Racing	Chevrolet	Brooks Racing
2	Ernie Irvan (R)	U.S. Racing	Chevrolet	Kroger
3	Dale Earnhardt	Richard Childress Racing	Chevrolet	GM Goodwrench
4	Rick Wilson	Morgan–McClure Motorsports	Oldsmobile	Kodak
5	Geoff Bodine	Hendrick Motorsports	Chevrolet	Levi Garrett
6	Mark Martin	Roush Racing	Ford	Stroh's Light
7	Alan Kulwicki	AK Racing	Ford	Zerex
8	Bobby Hillin Jr.	Stavola Brothers Racing	Buick	Miller High Life
9	Bill Elliott	Melling Racing	Ford	Coors Light
10	Ken Bouchard (R)	Whitcomb Racing	Chevrolet	Whitcomb Racing
11	Terry Labonte	Junior Johnson & Associates	Chevrolet	Budweiser
12	Bobby Allison	Stavola Brothers Racing	Buick	Miller High Life
15	Brett Bodine	Bud Moore Engineering	Ford	Crisco
17	Darrell Waltrip	Hendrick Motorsports	Chevrolet	Tide
21	Kyle Petty	Wood Brothers Racing	Ford	Citgo
25	Ken Schrader	Hendrick Motorsports	Chevrolet	Folgers
26	Ricky Rudd	King Racing	Buick	Quaker State
27	Rusty Wallace	Blue Max Racing	Pontiac	Kodiak
28	Davey Allison	Ranier-Lundy Racing	Ford	Texaco, Havoline
29	Dale Jarrett	Cale Yarborough Motorsports	Oldsmobile	Hardee's
30	Michael Waltrip	Bahari Racing	Pontiac	Country Time
31	Brad Teague	Bob Clark Motorsports	Oldsmobile	Slender You Figure Salons
33	Harry Gant	Mach 1 Racing	Chevrolet	Skoal Bandit
43	Richard Petty	Petty Enterprises	Pontiac	STP
44	Sterling Marlin	Hagan Racing	Oldsmobile	Piedmont Airlines
52	Jimmy Means	Jimmy Means Racing	Chevrolet	Eureka
55	Phil Parsons	Jackson Bros. Motorsports	Oldsmobile	Skoal, Crown Central Petroleum
67	Jimmy Hensley	Arrington Racing	Chevrolet	Pannill Sweatshirts
68	Derrike Cope	Testa Racing	Ford	Purolator
71	Dave Marcis	Marcis Auto Racing	Chevrolet	Lifebuoy
75	Neil Bonnett	RahMoc Enterprises	Pontiac	Valvoline
83	Lake Speed	Speed Racing	Oldsmobile	Wynn's, Kmart
88	Buddy Baker	Baker–Schiff Racing	Oldsmobile	Red Baron Frozen Pizza
90	Benny Parsons	Donlavey Racing	Ford	Bull's-Eye Barbecue Sauce
97	Rodney Combs	Winkle Motorsports	Buick	AC Spark Plug
98	Brad Noffsinger (R)	Curb Racing	Buick	Sunoco

== Qualifying ==
Qualifying was split into two rounds. The first round was held on Thursday, April 21, at 2:00 pm EST. Each driver would have one lap to set a time. During the first round, the top 20 drivers in the round would be guaranteed a starting spot in the race. If a driver was not able to guarantee a spot in the first round, they had the option to scrub their time from the first round and try and run a faster lap time in a second round qualifying run, held on Friday, April 22, at 1:30 pm EST. As with the first round, each driver would have one lap to set a time. For this specific race, positions 21-30 would be decided on time, and depending on who needed it, a select amount of positions were given to cars who had not otherwise qualified but were high enough in owner's points; up to two were given.

Ricky Rudd, driving for King Racing, would win the pole, setting a time of 20.734 and an average speed of 91.328 miles per hour (146.978 km/h) in the first round.

Four drivers would fail to qualify.

=== Full qualifying results ===
Pos.	#	Driver	Team	Make	Time	Speed
1	26	Ricky Rudd	King Racing	Buick	20.734	91.328
2	27	Rusty Wallace	Blue Max Racing	Pontiac	20.787	91.095
3	33	Harry Gant	Mach 1 Racing	Chevrolet	20.799	91.043
4	6	Mark Martin	Roush Racing	Ford	20.814	90.977
5	5	Geoff Bodine	Hendrick Motorsports	Chevrolet	20.841	90.859
6	17	Darrell Waltrip	Hendrick Motorsports	Chevrolet	20.849	90.825
7	25	Ken Schrader	Hendrick Motorsports	Chevrolet	20.854	90.803
8	7	Alan Kulwicki	AK Racing	Ford	20.899	90.607
9	75	Neil Bonnett	RahMoc Enterprises	Pontiac	20.910	90.560
10	67	Jimmy Hensley	Arrington Racing	Ford	20.963	90.331
11	21	Kyle Petty	Wood Brothers Racing	Ford	20.969	90.305
12	90	Benny Parsons	Donlavey Racing	Ford	20.971	90.296
13	29	Dale Jarrett	Cale Yarborough Motorsports	Oldsmobile	20.972	90.292
14	3	Dale Earnhardt	Richard Childress Racing	Chevrolet	20.981	90.253
15	9	Bill Elliott	Melling Racing	Ford	20.983	90.244
16	4	Rick Wilson	Morgan–McClure Motorsports	Oldsmobile	20.993	90.201
17	11	Terry Labonte	Junior Johnson & Associates	Chevrolet	21.011	90.124
18	71	Dave Marcis	Marcis Auto Racing	Chevrolet	21.017	90.098
19	15	Brett Bodine	Bud Moore Engineering	Ford	21.019	90.090
20	12	Bobby Allison	Stavola Brothers Racing	Buick	21.027	90.056
Failed to lock in Round 1
21	44	Sterling Marlin	Hagan Racing	Oldsmobile	20.782	91.117
22	83	Lake Speed	Speed Racing	Oldsmobile	20.823	90.938
23	30	Michael Waltrip	Bahari Racing	Pontiac	20.835	90.886
24	88	Buddy Baker	Baker–Schiff Racing	Oldsmobile	20.906	90.577
25	31	Brad Teague	Bob Clark Motorsports	Oldsmobile	21.039	90.004
26	28	Davey Allison	Ranier-Lundy Racing	Ford	21.073	89.859
27	43	Richard Petty	Petty Enterprises	Pontiac	21.077	89.842
28	98	Brad Noffsinger (R)	Curb Racing	Buick	21.090	89.787
29	8	Bobby Hillin Jr.	Stavola Brothers Racing	Buick	21.092	89.778
30	10	Ken Bouchard (R)	Whitcomb Racing	Buick	21.123	89.646
Provisionals
31	55	Phil Parsons	Jackson Bros. Motorsports	Oldsmobile	21.189	89.367
32	68	Derrike Cope	Testa Racing	Ford	21.135	89.595
Failed to qualify
33	52	Jimmy Means	Jimmy Means Racing	Pontiac	21.180	89.405
34	2	Ernie Irvan (R)	U.S. Racing	Chevrolet	21.184	89.388
35	97	Rodney Combs	Winkle Motorsports	Buick	21.368	88.618
36	00	Gary Brooks	Brooks Racing	Chevrolet	21.646	87.480
Official first round qualifying results
Official starting lineup

== Race results ==
Fin	St	#	Driver	Team	Make	Laps	Led	Status	Pts	Winnings
1	14	3	Dale Earnhardt	Richard Childress Racing	Chevrolet	500	182	running	185	$53,550
2	21	44	Sterling Marlin	Hagan Racing	Oldsmobile	500	101	running	175	$29,975
3	29	8	Bobby Hillin Jr.	Stavola Brothers Racing	Buick	499	11	running	170	$20,775
4	17	11	Terry Labonte	Junior Johnson & Associates	Chevrolet	498	1	running	165	$14,550
5	6	17	Darrell Waltrip	Hendrick Motorsports	Chevrolet	498	0	running	155	$14,250
6	26	28	Davey Allison	Ranier-Lundy Racing	Ford	498	0	running	150	$12,600
7	24	88	Buddy Baker	Baker–Schiff Racing	Oldsmobile	498	1	running	151	$8,400
8	20	12	Bobby Allison	Stavola Brothers Racing	Buick	496	0	running	142	$9,000
9	31	55	Phil Parsons	Jackson Bros. Motorsports	Oldsmobile	495	0	running	138	$6,200
10	7	25	Ken Schrader	Hendrick Motorsports	Chevrolet	494	0	running	134	$10,650
11	15	9	Bill Elliott	Melling Racing	Ford	493	0	running	130	$10,470
12	18	71	Dave Marcis	Marcis Auto Racing	Chevrolet	491	0	running	127	$5,520
13	13	29	Dale Jarrett	Cale Yarborough Motorsports	Oldsmobile	491	0	running	124	$2,470
14	12	90	Benny Parsons	Donlavey Racing	Ford	491	0	running	121	$5,370
15	5	5	Geoff Bodine	Hendrick Motorsports	Chevrolet	488	0	running	118	$6,400
16	2	27	Rusty Wallace	Blue Max Racing	Pontiac	488	0	running	115	$12,350
17	11	21	Kyle Petty	Wood Brothers Racing	Ford	460	0	running	112	$6,780
18	1	26	Ricky Rudd	King Racing	Buick	446	37	engine	114	$8,555
19	25	31	Brad Teague	Bob Clark Motorsports	Oldsmobile	407	0	running	106	$1,725
20	8	7	Alan Kulwicki	AK Racing	Ford	392	0	engine	103	$5,850
21	28	98	Brad Noffsinger (R)	Curb Racing	Buick	368	0	engine	100	$2,850
22	23	30	Michael Waltrip	Bahari Racing	Pontiac	314	0	engine	97	$4,055
23	4	6	Mark Martin	Roush Racing	Ford	309	0	engine	94	$2,820
24	10	67	Jimmy Hensley	Arrington Racing	Ford	290	0	ignition	0	$4,245
25	16	4	Rick Wilson	Morgan–McClure Motorsports	Oldsmobile	243	0	engine	88	$2,375
26	3	33	Harry Gant	Mach 1 Racing	Chevrolet	208	167	engine	90	$7,175
27	19	15	Brett Bodine	Bud Moore Engineering	Ford	205	0	engine	82	$8,725
28	22	83	Lake Speed	Speed Racing	Oldsmobile	193	0	engine	79	$1,400
29	32	68	Derrike Cope	Testa Racing	Ford	122	0	overheating	76	$3,550
30	9	75	Neil Bonnett	RahMoc Enterprises	Pontiac	44	0	engine	73	$7,560
31	30	10	Ken Bouchard (R)	Whitcomb Racing	Buick	42	0	engine	70	$1,610
32	27	43	Richard Petty	Petty Enterprises	Pontiac	31	0	engine	67	$3,510
Failed to qualify
33		52	Jimmy Means	Jimmy Means Racing	Pontiac					
34		2	Ernie Irvan (R)	U.S. Racing	Chevrolet					
35		97	Rodney Combs	Winkle Motorsports	Buick					
36		00	Gary Brooks	Brooks Racing	Chevrolet					
Official race results

== Standings after the race ==
Drivers' Championship standings

	Pos	Driver	Points
	1	Dale Earnhardt	1,244
2	2	Sterling Marlin	1,167 (-77)
	3	Bill Elliott	1,129 (-115)
2	4	Rusty Wallace	1,121 (–123)
2	5	Terry Labonte	1,097 (–147)
	6	Bobby Allison	1,085 (–159)
2	7	Neil Bonnett	1,052 (–192)
3	8	Bobby Hillin Jr.	1,030 (–214)
1	9	Darrell Waltrip	1,027 (–217)
1	10	Ken Schrader	1,013 (–231)
Official driver's standings

- Note: Only the first 10 positions are included for the driver standings.

Previous race: 1988 First Union 400	NASCAR Winston Cup Series; 1988 season	Next race: 1988 Winston 500
