= Jimmy Means =

American race car driver and racing team owner

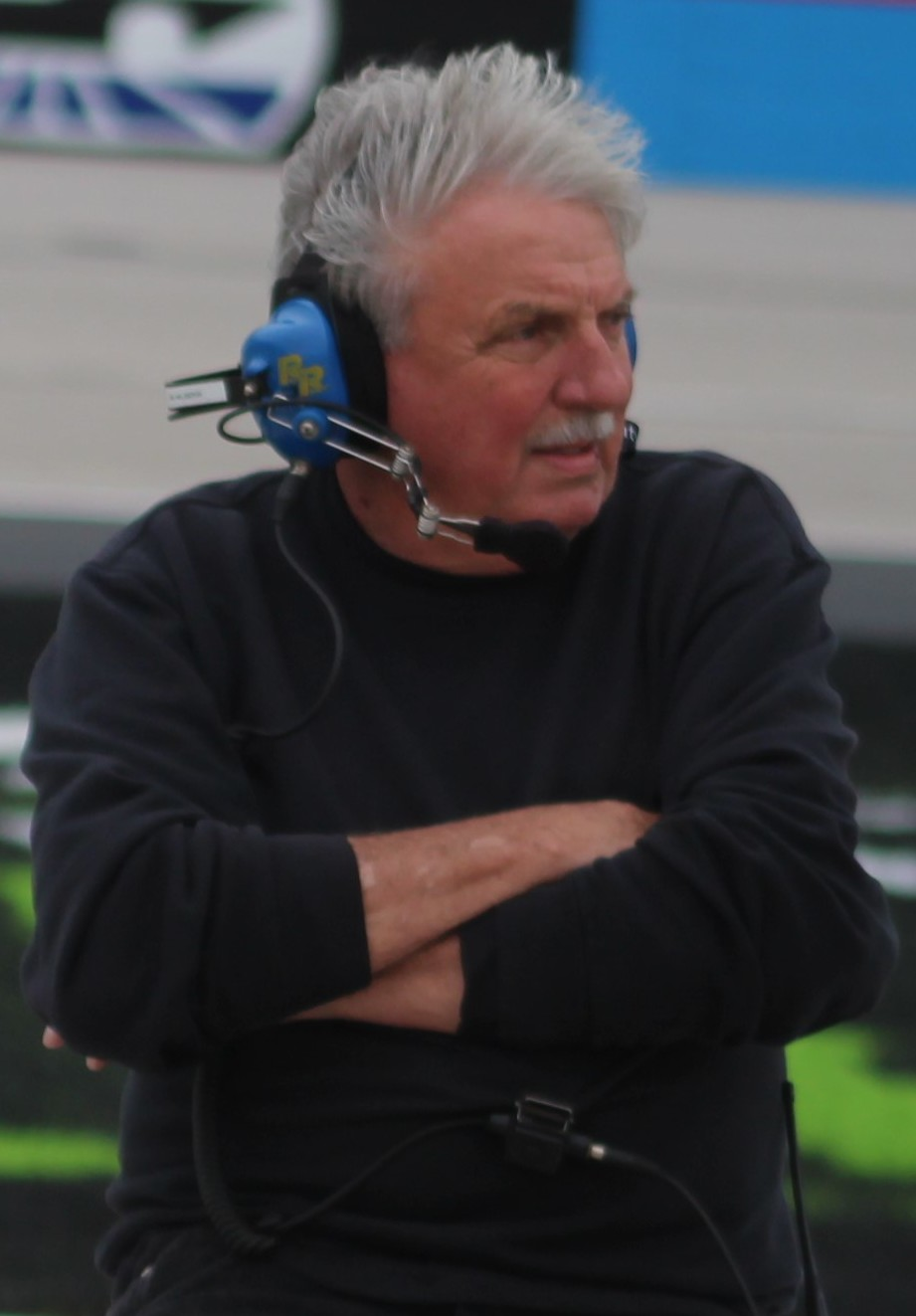
- Means at Texas Motor Speedway in 2019
- Born: James Bradford Means; May 29, 1950 (age 76); Texarkana, Arkansas, U.S.

NASCAR Cup Series career
- 455 races run over 18 years
- Best finish: 11th (1982)
- First race: 1976 Daytona 500 (Daytona)
- Last race: 1993 AC Delco 500 (Rockingham)
Wins	Top tens	Poles
0	17	0

NASCAR O'Reilly Auto Parts Series career
- 3 races run over 1 year
- Best finish: 65th (1989)
- First race: 1989 Goody's 300 (Daytona)
- Last race: 1989 Gatorade 200 (Darlington)
Wins	Top tens	Poles
0	1	0
- Statistics up to date as of December 25, 2012.

James Means (born May 29, 1950) is an American former racing driver and owner, who competed in the Winston Cup Series as an owner-driver. He is currently an adviser for Front Row Motorsports and a former owner of NASCAR Xfinity Series team Jimmy Means Racing.

Means competed in NASCAR for eighteen years in mostly his own equipment, posting seventeen career top-tens. He made three career Busch Series starts in 1989, finishing tenth at Darlington Raceway. Following his retirement, Means worked as a crew chief in NASCAR, working for Bud Moore Engineering and Moy Racing. Means was part the Alabama Gang which included Bobby Allison, Donnie Allison, Neil Bonnett and Red Farmer and later Davey Allison, Hut Stricklin, Steve Grissom and Mike Alexander.

Means' nickname "Smut" originated from his admiration for mechanic Smokey Yunick. Since the nickname "Smokey" was already taken in racing circles, Means' crew nicknamed him "Smut", the residue left behind by smoke.

Means is the father of crew chief and racing driver Brad Means.

== Local track career ==
Means won dozens of late model races in Alabama and Tennessee in the early 1970s, including track championships at Huntsville Speedway and the historic Nashville Speedway USA.

== Driving career ==
Means made his Cup debut in 1976 at the Daytona 500, driving the No. 5 Chevrolet for Bill Gray. He led one lap but finished 40th after an engine failure. He ran an additional eighteen races for Gray in the No. 52 car with sponsorship from WIXC, finishing in eleventh place twice. The following season, Means drove twenty-six races and had a career-best six top-ten finishes, but due to twelve DNFs, he finished nineteenth in points.

In 1978, Means began running as an independent driver, except for the Winston 500, where he drove for Bill Champion. He had two top-tens and improved three spots to finish sixteenth in points. He received new sponsorship from Mr. Transmission, but only had one top-ten in 1979, forcing him to fall to 23rd in points. After a sponsorship change to Thompson Industries for 1980, Means failed to finish higher than twelfth, but he was still able to move up to seventeenth in the standings. Broadway Motors became his new sponsor in 1981, and after two top-tens, he continued to move up to fourteenth in points. In 1982, he was able to garner an additional pair of ninth-place runs, and finished a career-best eleventh in points. It also marked the first time in his career he ran every race on the schedule.

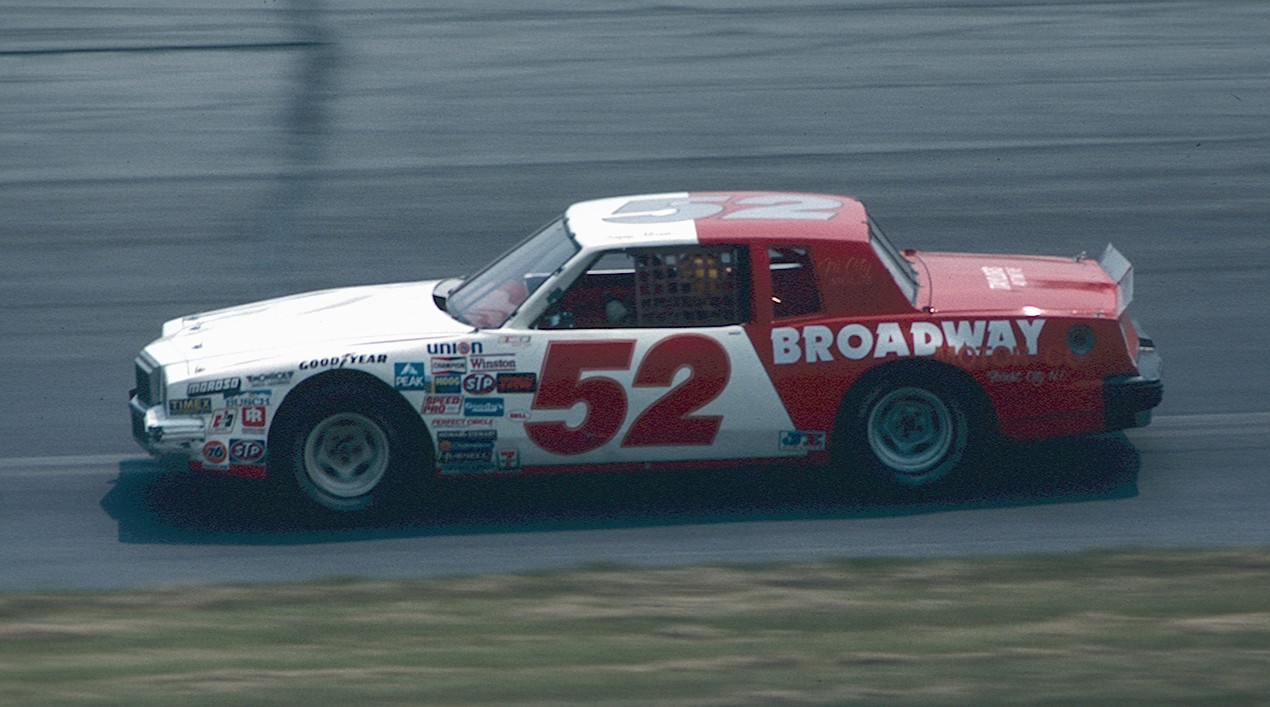
mid 1980s racecar

Means had the highest finish of his career in 1983, when he had a seventh-place run at Talladega. Combined with two other top-tens, he dropped seven spots in the standings. During the 1984, Means suffered injuries in a crash at Talladega Superspeedway, forcing him to miss several races. He did not have a top-ten finish over the next two years, and he lost his Broadway sponsorship, picking up funding from Voyles Auto Savage in late 1986. He also switched his manufacturer to Pontiac.

In 1987, Eureka Vacuum Cleaners became Means' new sponsor, and he had the last top-ten of his career at Richmond International Raceway. He dropped to what was at the time the lowest points finish of his career (30th) in 1988, and continued to struggle in 1989, failing to qualify for several races and dropping another spot in the standings despite a new sponsor in Alka-Seltzer. Means had already chosen to skip two races in favor of Bobby Hillin Jr. in 1991 after being involved with J. D. McDuffie's fatal crash; he continued to relinquish the ride to Mike Wallace at the end of the season.

Means competed in the 1988 NASCAR Christmas 500 at Australia's Calder Park Thunderdome, finishing 32nd and last due to an accident on the second lap.

After losing the Alka-Seltzer sponsorship, Means continued to drive a part-time schedule. After getting part-time funding from NAPA and Hurley Limo, Means ran eighteen races in 1993.

Means had planned to race again in 1994 for his own team. Speedweeks 1994 was marred by the deaths of fellow Alabama driver Neil Bonnett, and reigning Goody's Dash Series Champion Rodney Orr. The deaths of Bonnett and Orr convinced Means that he had no more reason to be racing. Means announced his retirement in the days following qualifying for the 1994 Daytona 500. He was winless in 455 starts.

In 1995, Means had a brief stint as team manager for the Bud Moore-owned, Lake Speed-driven No. 15 Ford Quality Care Thunderbird.

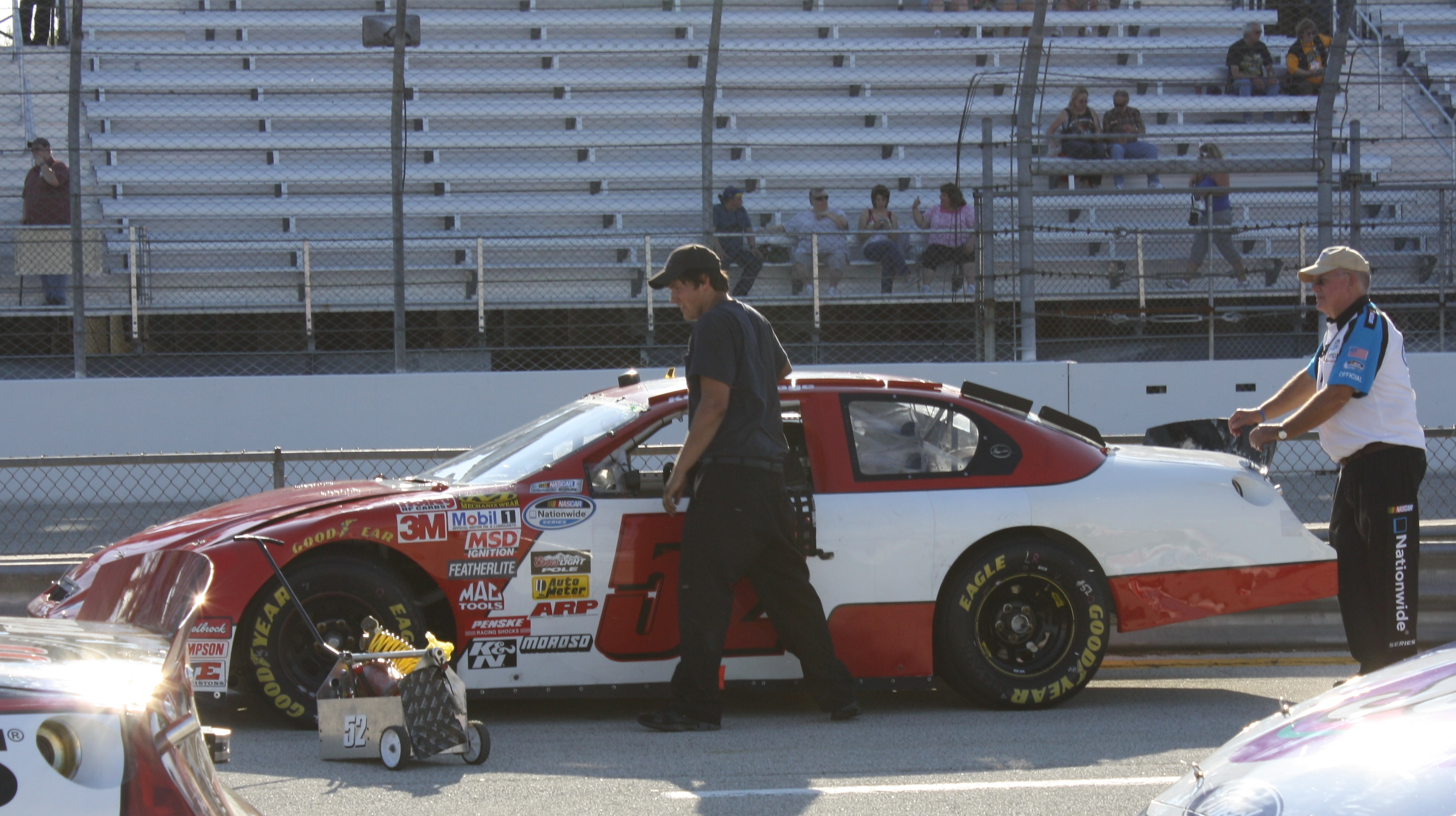
Means' 2009 Nationwide car

== Car owner ==
Means continued to own NASCAR cars through the 1990s and 2000s, primarily in the Busch Series (now Xfinity Series). In 2012, he was a part-owner of the new Hamilton Means Racing team, which fielded his traditional No. 52.

== Motorsports career results ==
=== NASCAR ===
(key) (Bold – Pole position awarded by qualifying time. Italics – Pole position earned by points standings or practice time. * – Most laps led)

==== Winston Cup Series ====
NASCAR Winston Cup Series results
Year	Team	No.	Make	1	2	3	4	5	6	7	8	9	10	11	12	13	14	15	16	17	18	19	20	21	22	23	24	25	26	27	28	29	30	31	NWCC	Pts	Ref
1976	Bill Gray	5	Chevy	RSD	DAY; 40	CAR	RCH	BRI																											24th	1752	
1976	Bill Gray	52	Chevy						ATL; 34	NWS	DAR	MAR	TAL; 31	NSV; 15	DOV	CLT; 39	RSD	MCH; 23	DAY; 11	NSV; 24	POC; 23	TAL; 11	MCH; 24	BRI; 19	DAR; 18	RCH; 24	DOV; 27	MAR; 20	NWS; 27	CLT	CAR; 23	ATL; 17	ONT; DNQ		24th	1752	
1977	Bill Gray	52	Chevy	RSD	DAY; 8	RCH; 29	CAR; 28	ATL; 20	NWS; 27	DAR; 20	BRI; 9	MAR; 8	TAL; 34	NSV; 9	DOV; 29	CLT; 19	RSD	MCH; 14	DAY; 20	NSV; 29	POC; 20		MCH; 17	BRI; 27	DAR	RCH; 10	DOV; 14	MAR; 9	NWS; 11	CLT; 28	CAR; 22	ATL; 40	ONT; DNQ		19th	2640	
1977	Osterlund Racing	98	Chevy																			TAL; 36													19th	2640	
1978	Jimmy Means Racing	52	Chevy	RSD	DAY; 35	RCH; 12	CAR; 10	ATL; 32	BRI; 23	DAR; 12	NWS; 14	MAR; 10		DOV; 17	CLT; 37	NSV; 30	RSD	MCH; 15	DAY; 13	NSV; 24	POC; 13	TAL; 32	MCH; 15	BRI; 19	DAR; 11	RCH; 13	DOV; 32	MAR; 23	NWS; 23	CLT	CAR; 13	ATL; 23	ONT; 22		16th	2756	
1978	Champion Racing	10	Ford										TAL; 26																						16th	2756	
1979	Jimmy Means Racing	52	Chevy	RSD	DAY; DNQ	CAR; 24	RCH; 27	ATL; 33	NWS; 30	BRI; 28	DAR; 30	MAR; 28	TAL; 12	NSV; 11	DOV; 31	CLT	TWS; 23	RSD; 31	MCH; 16	DAY; 22	NSV; 10	POC; 16	TAL; 13	MCH; 22	BRI; 19	DAR; 16	RCH; 20	DOV; 16	MAR; 17		NWS; 24	CAR; 31	ATL; 19	ONT	23rd	2575	
1979	Cunningham-Kelley Racing	14	Chevy																											CLT; 40					23rd	2575	
1980	Jimmy Means Racing	52	Chevy	RSD; 21		RCH; 30	CAR; 20	ATL; 12	BRI; 24	DAR; 28	NWS; 14	MAR; 12	TAL	NSV; 12	DOV; 27	CLT; 14	TWS; 19	RSD	MCH; 22		NSV; 16	POC; 14		MCH; 14	BRI; 22	DAR; 16	RCH; 13	DOV; 27	NWS; 12			CAR; 13	ATL; 20	ONT; 31	17th	2947	
1980	Jimmy Means Racing	52	Buick		DAY; 15															DAY; 26			TAL; 15												17th	2947	
1980	Price Racing	45	Chevy																											MAR; 30	CLT				17th	2947	
1981	Jimmy Means Racing	52	Chevy	RSD; 18					BRI; 14	NWS; 14				NSV; 14	DOV; 9															NWS; 9					14th	3142	
1981	Jimmy Means Racing	52	Pontiac		DAY; 21	RCH; 14	CAR; 29	ATL; 21			DAR; 23	MAR; 12	TAL; 27			CLT; 23	TWS; 19	RSD; 28	MCH; 28	DAY; 18		POC; 19	TAL; 16	MCH; 25	BRI; 12	DAR; 38	RCH; 16	DOV; 19	MAR; 15			CAR; 20	ATL; 35	RSD	14th	3142	
1981	Jimmy Means Racing	52	Buick																		NSV; 15														14th	3142	
1981	Negre Racing	8	Dodge																												CLT; 12				14th	3142	
1982	Jimmy Means Racing	52	Buick	DAY; 17			ATL; 16		DAR; 11	NWS; 18	MAR; 13	TAL; 9			CLT; 14	POC; 24	RSD; 18	MCH; 20	DAY; 21			TAL; 17	MCH; 11						CLT; 11						11th	3423	
1982	Jimmy Means Racing	52	Chevy		RCH; 18	BRI; 16														NSV; 14				BRI; 14		RCH; 19				MAR; 9	CAR; 15	ATL; 13			11th	3423	
1982	Jimmy Means Racing	52	Pontiac					CAR; 17					NSV; 23	DOV; 31							POC; 17				DAR; 23		DOV; 17	NWS; 14					RSD; 12		11th	3423	
1983	Jimmy Means Racing	52	Buick	DAY; 14			ATL; 32				TAL; 7				CLT; 38			MCH; 21	DAY; 36																18th	2983	
1983	Jimmy Means Racing	52	Chevy		RCH; 16				NWS; 14	MAR; 10		NSV; 12		BRI; 14		RSD; 18	POC; 20			NSV; 12				BRI; 26	DAR; 20	RCH; 24	DOV; 21	MAR; 15	NWS; 22	CLT; 23	CAR; 9	ATL; 18	RSD; 16		18th	2983	
1983	Jimmy Means Racing	52	Pontiac			CAR; 14		DAR; 12					DOV; 12								POC; 35	TAL	MCH												18th	2983	
1984	Jimmy Means Racing	52	Chevy	DAY; 17	RCH; 28				NWS; 25			TAL; 40	NSV; 22										MCH; 26			RCH; 18	DOV; 15								25th	2218	
1984	Jimmy Means Racing	52	Pontiac			CAR; 13	ATL	BRI; 17		DAR; 14	MAR			DOV; 16	CLT; 27	RSD	POC	MCH	DAY	NSV	POC; 25	TAL		BRI; 30	DAR; 18			MAR; 15	CLT; 19	NWS; 16	CAR; 18	ATL; 16	RSD; 21		25th	2218	
1985	Jimmy Means Racing	52	Chevy	DAY; 14	RCH; 21		ATL; 28	BRI; 12				TAL; 12			RSD; 37			DAY; 32					DAR; 27												23rd	2548	
1985	Jimmy Means Racing	52	Pontiac			CAR; 30			DAR; 15	NWS; 17	MAR; 14		DOV; 30	CLT; 32		POC; 22	MCH; 35		POC; 23	TAL; 42	MCH; 15	BRI; 27		RCH; 23	DOV; 13	MAR; 13	NWS; 21	CLT; 38	CAR; 18	ATL; 41	RSD; 20				23rd	2548	
1986	Jimmy Means Racing	52	Pontiac	DAY; 39	RCH; 11	CAR; 19	ATL; 41	BRI; DNQ	DAR; 25	NWS; 20	MAR; 12		DOV; 24	CLT; DNQ	RSD; 22	POC; 22	MCH; DNQ	DAY; 24	POC; 13	TAL; 15	GLN; 21	MCH; 25	BRI; 27	DAR; 15	RCH; 26	DOV; 24	MAR; 22	NWS; 27	CLT; 18	CAR; 22	ATL; 29	RSD; 17			22nd	2495	
1986	Jimmy Means Racing	52	Chevy									TAL; 16																							22nd	2495	
1987	Jimmy Means Racing	52	Pontiac	DAY; 24	CAR; 22	RCH; 14	ATL; 32	DAR; 36	NWS; 30	BRI; 29	MAR; 14	TAL; 33	CLT; 15	DOV; 13	POC; 19	RSD; 23	MCH; DNQ				GLN; 19		BRI; 13		RCH; 9	DOV; 22	MAR; 30	NWS; 21		CAR; 20	RSD; 27	ATL; 29			23rd	2483	
1987	Jimmy Means Racing	52	Chevy															DAY; 29	POC; 38	TAL; 36		MCH; 37		DAR; 22											23rd	2483	
1987	Hendrick Motorsports	52	Chevy																										CLT; 40						23rd	2483	
1988	Jimmy Means Racing	52	Chevy	DAY; 25	RCH; 24																														30th	2045	
1988	Jimmy Means Racing	52	Pontiac			CAR; 40	ATL; 42	DAR; 35	BRI; 32	NWS; 30	MAR; DNQ	TAL; 23	CLT; 12	DOV; 27	RSD; 43	POC; 20	MCH; 36	DAY; 27	POC; 39	TAL; 23	GLN; 14	MCH; 38	BRI; DNQ	DAR; 24	RCH; 29	DOV; 19	MAR; 23	CLT; 42	NWS; DNQ	CAR; 39	PHO; 24	ATL; 38			30th	2045	
1988	Donlavey Racing	90	Ford																										NWS; 24						30th	2045	
1989	Jimmy Means Racing	52	Pontiac	DAY; DNQ	CAR; 33	ATL; 18	RCH; DNQ	DAR; 38	BRI; DNQ	NWS; 32	MAR; DNQ	TAL; 41	CLT; 41	DOV; 24	SON; DNQ	POC; 29	MCH; 28	DAY; 12	POC; 24	TAL; 39	GLN; 33	MCH; 27	BRI; DNQ	DAR; 26	RCH; 19	DOV; 21	MAR; 31	CLT; 37	NWS; 22	CAR; 31	PHO; 25	ATL; DNQ			31st	1698	
1990	Jimmy Means Racing	52	Pontiac	DAY; 29	RCH; 18	CAR; 21	ATL; 31	DAR; 31	BRI; 29	NWS; 28	MAR; 19	TAL; 21	CLT; DNQ	DOV; 22	SON; DNQ	POC; 27	MCH; 39	DAY; 12	POC; 21	TAL; 30	GLN; 39	MCH; 27	BRI; 22	DAR; 36	RCH; 18	DOV; 24	MAR; 16	NWS; 30	CLT; 39	CAR; 28	PHO; 25	ATL; 28			29th	2271	
1991	Jimmy Means Racing	52	Pontiac	DAY; 39	RCH; 31	CAR; 27	ATL; 31	DAR; 23	BRI; DNQ	NWS; DNQ	MAR; DNQ	TAL; 20	CLT; 38	DOV	SON	POC; 26	MCH; 27	DAY; 26	POC; 21	TAL; 23	GLN; 39	MCH; 27	BRI; DNQ	DAR; 28	RCH; 35	DOV; 23	MAR; DNQ			CAR; 35	PHO	ATL			33rd	1562	
1991	Jimmy Means Racing	52	Olds																									NWS; 28	CLT; 24						33rd	1562	
1992	Jimmy Means Racing	52	Pontiac	DAY; DNQ	CAR; 33	RCH; 35	ATL; 38	DAR; 20	BRI	NWS; 32	MAR; 30	TAL; 34	CLT; 42	DOV; 31	SON	POC; 35	MCH; 23	DAY; 39	POC; 39	TAL; 32	GLN	MCH; 39	BRI; 24	DAR; 22	RCH; 29	DOV; 23	MAR; DNQ	NWS; DNQ	CLT; 38	CAR; 26	PHO				32nd	1531	
1992	Jimmy Means Racing	52	Ford																													ATL; 21			32nd	1531	
1993	Jimmy Means Racing	52	Ford	DAY	CAR	RCH	ATL; 22	DAR; 31	BRI; 16	NWS; 27	MAR; DNQ	TAL; 32	SON	CLT; 38	DOV; 26	POC; 22	MCH; 28	DAY; 36	NHA; 34	POC; DNQ	TAL; 25	GLN	MCH; 25	BRI; 18		RCH; 26	DOV; 17	MAR; DNQ	NWS; DNQ	CLT	CAR; 29	PHO	ATL; DNQ		36th	1471	
1993	Jimmy Means Racing	53	Ford																						DAR; 39										36th	1471	

===== Daytona 500 =====
Year	Team	Manufacturer	Start	Finish
1976	Bill Gray	Chevrolet	20	40
1977	Bill Gray	Chevrolet	23	8
1978	Jimmy Means Racing	Chevrolet	39	35
1979	Jimmy Means Racing	Chevrolet	DNQ	
1980	Jimmy Means Racing	Buick	26	15
1981	Jimmy Means Racing	Pontiac	26	21
1982	Jimmy Means Racing	Buick	40	17
1983	Jimmy Means Racing	Buick	42	14
1984	Jimmy Means Racing	Chevrolet	41	17
1985	Jimmy Means Racing	Chevrolet	25	14
1986	Jimmy Means Racing	Pontiac	42	39
1987	Jimmy Means Racing	Pontiac	40	24
1988	Jimmy Means Racing	Chevrolet	37	25
1989	Jimmy Means Racing	Pontiac	DNQ	
1990	Jimmy Means Racing	Pontiac	37	29
1991	Jimmy Means Racing	Pontiac	39	39
1992	Jimmy Means Racing	Pontiac	DNQ	

==== Busch Series ====
NASCAR Busch Series results
Year	Team	No.	Make	1	2	3	4	5	6	7	8	9	10	11	12	13	14	15	16	17	18	19	20	21	22	23	24	25	26	27	28	29	NBSC	Pts	Ref
1989	Mac Martin Racing	92	Pontiac	DAY; 30	CAR	MAR	HCY	DAR	BRI	NZH	SBO	LAN	NSV	CLT; 30	DOV	ROU	LVL	VOL	MYB	SBO	HCY	DUB	IRP	ROU	BRI	DAR; 10	RCH	DOV	MAR	CLT	CAR	MAR	65th	280	
