= Bobby Hillin Jr. =

American racing driver (born 1964)

- Born: Robert Keith Hillin Jr. June 5, 1964 (age 62); Midland, Texas, U.S.

NASCAR Cup Series career
- 334 races run over 17 years
- Best finish: 9th (1986)
- First race: 1982 Northwestern Bank 400 (North Wilkesboro)
- Last race: 2000 goracing.com 500 (Bristol)
- First win: 1986 Talladega 500 (Talladega)
Wins	Top tens	Poles
1	43	0

NASCAR O'Reilly Auto Parts Series career
- 115 races run over 14 years
- Best finish: 19th (1999)
- First race: 1986 All Pro 300 (Charlotte)
- Last race: 2009 O'Reilly Challenge (Texas)
- First win: 1988 Budweiser 200 (Dover)
- Last win: 1989 GM Parts 300 (Nazareth)
Wins	Top tens	Poles
2	25	0

Robert Keith Hillin Jr. (born June 5, 1964) is an American stock car racing driver. He is a former competitor in NASCAR's Winston Cup and Busch Series, and once held the record for being the youngest driver ever to win a Winston Cup Series event.

== Racing career ==
Born in Midland, Texas, Hillin grew up watching his father's racing team, Longhorn Racing, compete in United States Auto Club-sanctioned sprint and Indy car racing events. An all-district linebacker in high school, he began his stock car career at the age of thirteen and soon after won the track championship at Odessa Speedbowl in Odessa, Texas, and attended the Buck Baker Driving School at the age of sixteen.

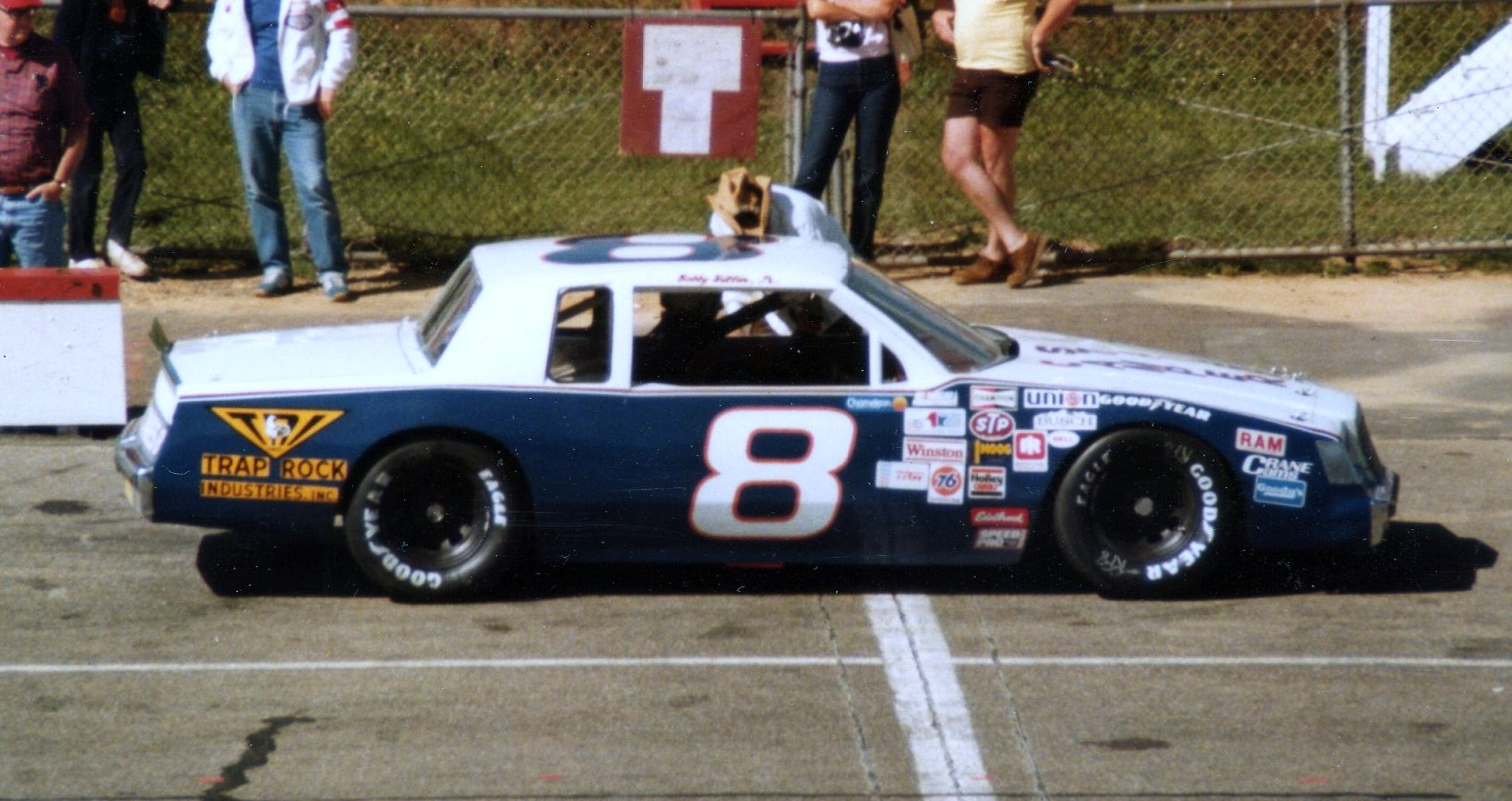
Hillin's 1984 Winston Cup car

Hillin made his debut in NASCAR Winston Cup Series competition at the age of seventeen, driving a car owned and sponsored by his family and crewed by Harry Hyde in the 1982 Northwestern Bank 400 at North Wilkesboro Speedway to a 21st-place finish. Hillin moved to North Carolina to further his career, continuing his education through correspondence courses; he graduated from high school the day before the 1983 Coca-Cola World 600; in 1984 he joined Stavola Brothers Racing, and in 1986 became the youngest winner in NASCAR's "modern era" when he won the Talladega 500 for the team, at the age of 22 years, 1 month and 22 days.

Despite the win, and two wins in the NASCAR Busch Series in 1988 and 1989 driving for Highline Racing, Hillin's career took a downturn; he would later say he was not mature enough to deal with the pressures of being a NASCAR winner. He left the Stavola Brothers team after the 1990 season; he started the 1991 season qualifying a backup car for Moroso Racing fastest in third-round time trials for the Daytona 500. A seventh-place finish in the 500 won Hillin the team's regular ride, however after ten races a lack of sponsorship forced the team to cut back its schedule, and Hillin was released; After two races with Jimmy Means Racing, Hillin was named as substitute driver for Kyle Petty, who had broken his leg earlier in the year in a wreck at Talladega; he drove eight races in the Team SABCO No. 42 before Petty returned.

Hillin then joined Team Ireland late in the 1991 season, and then for a partial season in 1992. When the team closed late in 1992 after being disqualified at the October Charlotte race, Hillin moved to Donlavey Racing, running the full 1993 season for the team. After three races in 1994, Hillin resigned from the team; Hillin ran a partial schedule the rest of the year for Charles Hardy Racing and Moroso Racing, then attempted two races early in 1995 for Moroso, before joining Jasper Motorsports twelve races into the 1995 season, replacing Davy Jones. Hillin remained with the team through 1996 and into 1997. Hillin also competed in the Suzuka Thunder Special, an exhibition race held at Suzuka Circuit in Japan following the 1996 season; he finished seventh in the event. He was released from the team after failing to qualify for the 1997 Coca-Cola 600; he continued to drive for the team through the Pocono 500 before being replaced by Morgan Shepherd. Later that year Hillin attempted three races for Triad Motorsports, failing to qualify for any; he would only drive one further Winston Cup race in his career, at Bristol Motor Speedway in 2000 for Melling Racing, substituting for an injured Stacy Compton.

Hillin restarted his own Busch Series team for the 1998 season, including five Major League Baseball players in the team's ownership; the team underperformed, and after the 2000 season he chose to go into semi-retirement, having decided to go into business in his native Texas. In 2008, Hillin returned briefly to competition, driving at Kansas Speedway in the Nationwide Series for MacDonald Motorsports; he drove one additional race for the team in the series at Texas Motor Speedway in 2009, but then retired for good from the sport.

== Personal life ==
Hillin is married to Jamie Patterson of Austin, Texas. He is currently the CEO of T-Rex Engineering & Construction, providing services to the Gulf of Mexico's oil drilling industry.

Hillin's oldest son, Luke Hillin, is Sr. Associate Athletic Director at the University of Tulsa.

== Motorsports career results ==
=== NASCAR ===
(key) (Bold – Pole position awarded by qualifying time. Italics – Pole position earned by points standings or practice time. * – Most laps led.)

==== Winston Cup Series ====
NASCAR Winston Cup Series results
Year	Team	No.	Make	1	2	3	4	5	6	7	8	9	10	11	12	13	14	15	16	17	18	19	20	21	22	23	24	25	26	27	28	29	30	31	32	33	34	NWCC	Pts	Ref
1982	Hillin Racing	8	Buick	DAY	RCH	BRI	ATL	CAR	DAR	NWS; 21	MAR	TAL	NSV	DOV	CLT	POC; 36	RSD	MCH; 16	DAY; 20	NSV	POC	TAL; 19	MCH	BRI	DAR	RCH	DOV	NWS	CLT	MAR	CAR	ATL	RSD					46th	379	
1983	Hillin Racing	8	Buick	DAY; DNQ	RCH	CAR; 25	ATL; 19	DAR; DNQ	NWS; 16	MAR	TAL	NSV	DOV	BRI	CLT; 11	RSD			DAY; 15	NSV	POC; 16	TAL; 13	MCH; 25	BRI	DAR; 41	RCH	DOV; 11	MAR	NWS	CLT; 36	CAR	ATL						37th	737	
1983	Hillin Racing	96	Buick														POC; 37	MCH																				37th	737	
1983	Ulrich Racing	6	Buick																														RSD; DNQ					37th	737	
1984	Stavola Brothers Racing	8	Chevy	DAY; 35	RCH	CAR	ATL; 37	BRI	NWS			TAL; 11	NSV		CLT; 33	RSD			DAY; 37	NSV	POC; 33	TAL; 15	MCH; 21	BRI	DAR; 23	RCH	DOV; DNQ	MAR	CLT; 15	NWS		ATL; 33	RSD					32nd	1477	
1984	Stavola Brothers Racing	8	Buick							DAR; 12	MAR			DOV; 25			POC; 16	MCH; 19													CAR; 12							32nd	1477	
1985	Stavola Brothers Racing	8	Chevy	DAY; 9	RCH; 11	CAR; 24	ATL; 12	BRI; 9	DAR; 20	NWS; 19	MAR; 18	TAL; 9	DOV; 12	CLT; 12	RSD; 17	POC; 18	MCH; 28	DAY; 15	POC; 29	TAL; 38	MCH; 26	BRI; 24	DAR; 13	RCH; 21	DOV; 23	MAR; 8	NWS; 17	CLT; 9	CAR; 25	ATL; 19	RSD; 13							15th	3091	
1986	Stavola Brothers Racing	8	Chevy	DAY; 4																																		9th	3546	
1986	Stavola Brothers Racing	8	Buick		RCH; 6	CAR; 39	ATL; 16	BRI; 28	DAR; 38	NWS; 13	MAR; 6	TAL; 4	DOV; 8	CLT; 15	RSD; 32	POC; 10	MCH; 7	DAY; 3	POC; 33	TAL; 1	GLN; 28	MCH; 13	BRI; 9	DAR; 7	RCH; 10	DOV; 9	MAR; 17	NWS; 15	CLT; 26	CAR; 11	ATL; 15	RSD; 6						9th	3546	
1987	Stavola Brothers Racing	8	Buick	DAY; 13	CAR; 14	RCH; 11	ATL; 24	DAR; 23	NWS; 13	BRI; 26	MAR; 15	TAL; 5	CLT; 34	DOV; 26	POC; 14	RSD; 13	MCH; 6	DAY; 13	POC; 15	TAL; 40	GLN; 29	MCH; 13	BRI; 29	DAR; 6	RCH; 15	DOV; 39	MAR; 22	NWS; 8	CLT; 28	CAR; 33	RSD; 34	ATL; 14						19th	3027	
1988	Stavola Brothers Racing	8	Buick	DAY; 13	RCH; 8	CAR; 21	ATL; 6	DAR; 17	BRI; 15	NWS; 18	MAR; 3	TAL; 13	CLT; 14	DOV; 17	RSD; 24	POC; 15	MCH; 12	DAY; 13	POC; 21	TAL; 17	GLN; 13	MCH; 37	BRI; 10	DAR; 30	RCH; 14	DOV; 21	MAR; 14	CLT; 6	NWS; 13	CAR; 23	PHO; 7	ATL; 9						12th	3446	
1989	Stavola Brothers Racing	8	Buick	DAY; 39	CAR; 15	ATL; 30	RCH; 15	DAR; 26	BRI; 27	NWS; DNQ	MAR; 21	TAL; 35	CLT; 9	DOV; 13	SON; 13	POC; 13	MCH; 20	DAY; 28	POC; 11	TAL; 29	GLN; 5	MCH; 14	BRI; 7	DAR; 8	RCH; 13	DOV; 15	MAR; 27	CLT; 9	NWS; 15	CAR; 8	PHO; 18	ATL; 7						16th	3139	
1990	Stavola Brothers Racing	8	Buick	DAY; 6	RCH; 31	CAR; 17	ATL; 16	DAR; 12	BRI; 21	NWS; 30	MAR; 21	TAL; 23	CLT; 34	DOV; 16	SON; 5	POC; 29	MCH; 28	DAY; 6	POC; 12	TAL; 10	GLN; 16	MCH; 21	BRI; 15	DAR; 31	RCH; 11	DOV; 14	MAR; 26	NWS; 14	CLT; 31	CAR; 14	PHO; 42	ATL; 22						19th	3048	
1991	Moroso Racing	27	Olds	DAY; 7																																		30th	2317	
1991	Moroso Racing	20	Olds		RCH; 20	CAR; 18	ATL; 21	DAR; 17	BRI; 15	NWS; 20	MAR; 17	TAL; 17	CLT; 19																									30th	2317	
1991	Jimmy Means Racing	52	Pontiac											DOV; 19	SON; 21																							30th	2317	
1991	Team SABCO	42	Pontiac													POC; 15	MCH; 15	DAY; 15	POC; 28	TAL; 11	GLN; 18	MCH; 33	BRI; 30	DAR	RCH	DOV	MAR	NWS										30th	2317	
1991	Team Ireland	53	Chevy																										CLT; 18	CAR; DNQ	PHO	ATL; 32						30th	2317	
1992	Team Ireland	31	Chevy	DAY; 38	CAR	RCH	ATL; 21	DAR; DNQ	BRI			TAL; 28	CLT; 13	DOV	SON	POC	MCH; 17	DAY; 25	POC; 25		GLN; 23	MCH; 26	BRI	DAR; 17	RCH	DOV	MAR	NWS	CLT; 40	CAR	PHO							34th	1135	
1992	Cale Yarborough Motorsports	66	Ford							NWS; 25	MAR																											34th	1135	
1992	Yates Racing	28	Ford																	TAL; QL^{†}																		34th	1135	
1992	Donlavey Racing	90	Ford																													ATL; 29						34th	1135	
1993	Donlavey Racing	90	Ford	DAY; 35	CAR; 19	RCH; 28	ATL; 15	DAR; 35	BRI; 33	NWS; 26	MAR; 23	TAL; 17	SON; 41	CLT; 16	DOV; 25	POC; 38	MCH; 33	DAY; 12	NHA; 20	POC; 20	TAL; 13	GLN; 35	MCH; 11	BRI; 12	DAR; 24	RCH; 27	DOV; 12	MAR; 22	NWS; 22	CLT; 20	CAR; 33	PHO; 18	ATL; 41					27th	2717	
1994	Donlavey Racing	90	Ford	DAY; 24	CAR; 33	RCH; 26	ATL	DAR	BRI	NWS	MAR	TAL	SON																									44th	749	
1994	Charles Hardy Racing	44	Ford											CLT; DNQ	DOV	POC	MCH; 14					IND; 21	GLN	MCH; 40	BRI	DAR	RCH	DOV			CLT; 15	CAR	PHO					44th	749	
1994	Moroso Racing	20	Ford															DAY; DNQ	NHA	POC	TAL; 23								MAR; DNQ	NWS				ATL; 43				44th	749	
1995	Moroso Racing	20	Ford	DAY; DNQ	CAR	RCH	ATL	DAR	BRI	NWS	MAR	TAL	SON	CLT; DNQ																								37th	1686	
1995	Jasper Motorsports	77	Ford												DOV; 42	POC; 23	MCH; 13	DAY; 28	NHA; 20	POC; 12	TAL; 16	IND; 39	GLN; 27	MCH; 39	BRI; DNQ	DAR; 13	RCH; 36	DOV; 13	MAR; DNQ	NWS; 24	CLT; 24	CAR; 21	PHO; 21	ATL; 9				37th	1686	
1996	Jasper Motorsports	77	Ford	DAY; DNQ	CAR; 18	RCH; 26	ATL; 28	DAR; 41	BRI; DNQ	NWS; DNQ	MAR; DNQ	TAL; DNQ	SON; 43	CLT; 26	DOV; 29	POC; 13	MCH; 14	DAY; 32	NHA; 21	POC; 38	TAL; 35	IND; 26	GLN; 29	MCH; 19	BRI; DNQ	DAR; 18	RCH; 32	DOV; 12	MAR; 24	NWS; 35	CLT; 36	CAR; 33	PHO; 39	ATL; 16				37th	2128	
1996	Bill Elliott Racing	94	Ford																						BRI; 22													37th	2128	
1997	Jasper Motorsports	77	Ford	DAY; 38	CAR; 42	RCH; 41	ATL; DNQ	DAR; 42	TEX; 42	BRI; DNQ	MAR; 33	SON; 35	TAL; 20	CLT; DNQ	DOV; 43	POC; 37	MCH	CAL	DAY	NHA																		47th	511	
1997	Triad Motorsports	78	Ford																		POC; DNQ	IND; DNQ	GLN; DNQ	MCH	BRI	DAR	RCH	NHA	DOV	MAR	CLT	TAL	CAR	PHO	ATL			47th	511	
2000	Melling Racing	9	Ford	DAY	CAR	LVS	ATL	DAR	BRI	TEX	MAR	TAL	CAL	RCH	CLT	DOV	MCH	POC	SON	DAY	NHA	POC	IND	GLN	MCH	BRI; 40	DAR	RCH	NHA	DOV	MAR	CLT	TAL	CAR	PHO	HOM	ATL	68th	43	
^{†} - Qualified for Davey Allison

===== Daytona 500 =====
Year	Team	Manufacturer	Start	Finish
1983	Hillin Racing	Buick	DNQ	
1984	Stavola Brothers Racing	Chevrolet	22	35
1985	Stavola Brothers Racing	Chevrolet	38	9
1986	Stavola Brothers Racing	Chevrolet	25	4
1987	Stavola Brothers Racing	Buick	21	13
1988	Stavola Brothers Racing	Buick	9	13
1989	Stavola Brothers Racing	Buick	26	39
1990	Stavola Brothers Racing	Buick	10	6
1991	Moroso Racing	Oldsmobile	36	7
1992	Team Ireland	Chevrolet	26	38
1993	Donlavey Racing	Ford	9	35
1994	Donlavey Racing	Ford	33	24
1995	Moroso Racing	Ford	DNQ	
1996	Jasper Motorsports	Ford	DNQ	
1997	Jasper Motorsports	Ford	31	38

==== Nationwide Series ====
NASCAR Nationwide Series results
Year	Team	No.	Make	1	2	3	4	5	6	7	8	9	10	11	12	13	14	15	16	17	18	19	20	21	22	23	24	25	26	27	28	29	30	31	32	33	34	35	NNSC	Pts	Ref
1986	Highline Racing	92	Buick	DAY	CAR	HCY	MAR	BRI	DAR	SBO	LGY	JFC	DOV	CLT	SBO	HCY	ROU	IRP	SBO	RAL	OXF	SBO	HCY	LGY	ROU	BRI	DAR	RCH	DOV	MAR	ROU	CLT; 28	CAR	MAR					87th	79	
1988	Highline Racing	81	Buick	DAY; 24	HCY	CAR; 4	MAR	DAR; 5	BRI	LNG	NZH; 23	SBO	NSV	CLT; 2	DOV; 1	ROU	LAN	LVL	MYB; 9	OXF	SBO	HCY	LNG	IRP; 30	ROU	BRI; 12	DAR; 31	RCH; 12	DOV; 4	MAR; 16	CLT; 3	CAR; 7	MAR; 10						21st	2105	
1989	Highline Racing	81	Buick	DAY; 14	CAR; 12	MAR	HCY	DAR; 21	BRI	NZH; 1	SBO	LAN; 10	NSV	CLT; 38	DOV; 16	ROU	LVL	VOL	MYB	SBO; 24	HCY	DUB	IRP; 36	ROU	BRI	DAR; 33	RCH; 10	DOV; 28	MAR	CLT; 34	CAR; 6	MAR							27th	1460	
1990	Highline Racing	42	Pontiac	DAY	RCH	CAR	MAR	HCY	DAR	BRI	LAN	SBO	NZH	HCY	CLT	DOV	ROU	VOL	MYB	OXF	NHA	SBO	DUB	IRP	ROU	BRI	DAR; 4	RCH	DOV	MAR	CLT	NHA	CAR; 10						60th	379	
1990	Highline Racing	81	Pontiac																															MAR; 26					60th	379	
1991	Roy Hill Racing	4	Chevy	DAY; 11	RCH	CAR; 39	MAR	VOL	HCY	DAR	BRI	LAN	SBO	NZH																									72nd	237	
1991	O3 Racing Enterprises	03	Chevy												CLT; 34	DOV	ROU	HCY	MYB	GLN	OXF	NHA	SBO	DUB	IRP	ROU	BRI	DAR	RCH	DOV	CLT	NHA	CAR	MAR					72nd	237	
1992	Shoemaker Racing	64	Pontiac	DAY	CAR	RCH	ATL	MAR	DAR	BRI	HCY	LAN	DUB	NZH	CLT	DOV	ROU	MYB	GLN	VOL	NHA; 20	TAL	IRP	ROU	MCH	NHA	BRI	DAR	RCH	DOV									74th	200	
1992	Allison Racing	28	Ford																												CLT; 22	MAR	CAR	HCY					74th	200	
1993	Hillin Racing	95	Ford	DAY	CAR	RCH	DAR	BRI	HCY	ROU	MAR	NZH	CLT	DOV	MYB	GLN	MLW	TAL	IRP	MCH	NHA	BRI	DAR	RCH	DOV	ROU	CLT; 40	MAR	CAR	HCY	ATL								109th	43	
1994	J&J Racing	99	Chevy	DAY	CAR	RCH	ATL	MAR	DAR	HCY	BRI	ROU	NHA	NZH	CLT	DOV	MYB	GLN	MLW	SBO	TAL	HCY	IRP	MCH	BRI	DAR; 34	RCH	DOV; 7	CLT; 28	MAR	CAR								66th	286	
1995	Moroso Racing	20	Ford	DAY; 26	CAR; 41	RCH; 21	ATL; 28	NSV; 24	DAR; 8	BRI; 28	HCY; DNQ	NHA	NZH	CLT	DOV	MYB	GLN	MLW	TAL	SBO	IRP	MCH	BRI	DAR	RCH	DOV	CLT	CAR	HOM										46th	616	
1997	Bobby Jones Enterprises	50	Pontiac	DAY	CAR	RCH	ATL	LVS	DAR	HCY	TEX	BRI	NSV	TAL	NHA	NZH	CLT	DOV	SBO	GLN	MLW	MYB	GTY; DNQ	IRP	MCH	BRI	DAR	RCH	DOV	CLT	CAL	CAR	HOM						N/A	-	
1998	Bobby Hillin Racing	8	Chevy	DAY; 38	CAR; DNQ	LVS; DNQ	NSV; 26	DAR; 19	BRI; 23	TEX; DNQ	HCY	TAL; 26	NHA	NZH	CLT; 9	DOV; 2	RCH; 19	PPR; 34	GLN; 36	MLW; 21	MYB; DNQ	CAL; 15	SBO; 32	IRP; 10	MCH; 7	BRI; 14	DAR; 29	RCH; 34	DOV; 17	CLT; DNQ	GTY; 17	CAR; 8	ATL; 30	HOM; 25					24th	2304	
1999	Bobby Hillin Racing	8	Chevy	DAY; 5	CAR; 34	LVS; DNQ	ATL; 19	DAR; 22	TEX; 34	NSV; 14	BRI; 13	TAL; 29	CAL; 24	NHA; 35	RCH; 12	NZH; 25	CLT; DNQ	DOV; 43	SBO; 16	GLN	MLW; 12	MYB; 15	PPR; 14	GTY; 18	IRP	MCH; DNQ	BRI; 10	DAR; 35	RCH; 21	DOV; 29	CLT; DNQ	CAR; 20	MEM; 19	PHO; 42	HOM; 23				19th	2517	
2000	Bobby Hillin Racing	8	Chevy	DAY; 33	CAR; 42	LVS; 32	ATL; 23	DAR; DNQ	BRI; DNQ	TEX; DNQ	NSV; 18	TAL; DNQ	CAL; DNQ	RCH; 13	NHA; 32	CLT; DNQ	DOV; DNQ	SBO; 9	MYB; 23	GLN; 29	MLW; 22	NZH; 24	PPR; 42	GTY; DNQ	IRP; 42	MCH	BRI	DAR	RCH	DOV	CLT	CAR	MEM	PHO	HOM				41st	1137	
2008	MacDonald Motorsports	81	Dodge	DAY	CAL	LVS	ATL	BRI	NSH	TEX	PHO	MXC	TAL	RCH	DAR	CLT	DOV	NSH	KEN	MLW	NHA	DAY	CHI	GTY	IRP	CGV	GLN	MCH	BRI	CAL	RCH	DOV	KAN; 36	CLT	MEM	TEX	PHO	HOM	137th	55	
2009	MacDonald Motorsports	81	Dodge	DAY	CAL	LVS	BRI	TEX	NSH	PHO	TAL	RCH	DAR	CLT	DOV	NSH	KEN	MLW	NHA	DAY	CHI	GTY	IRP	IOW	GLN	MCH	BRI	CGV	ATL	RCH	DOV	KAN	CAL	CLT	MEM	TEX; 23	PHO	HOM	134th	94	
