= 1988 Pepsi Firecracker 400 =

15th race of the 1988 NASCAR Winston Cup Series

Race details
- Race 15 of 29 in the 1988 NASCAR Winston Cup Series
- The 1988 Pepsi Firecracker 400 program cover, featuring Bobby Allison.
- Date: July 2, 1988
- Official name: 30th Annual Pepsi Firecracker 400
- Location: Daytona Beach, Florida, Daytona International Speedway
- Course: Permanent racing facility
- Course length: 4.0 km (2.5 miles)
- Distance: 160 laps, 400 mi (643.737 km)
- Scheduled distance: 160 laps, 400 mi (643.737 km)
- Average speed: 122.866 miles per hour (197.734 km/h)
- Attendance: 83,000

Pole position
Driver	Darrell Waltrip	Hendrick Motorsports
- Time: 46.435

Most laps led
Driver	Bill Elliott	Melling Racing
- Laps: 122

Winner
No. 9	Bill Elliott	Melling Racing

Television in the United States
- Network: ABC
- Announcers: Paul Page, Johnny Rutherford

Radio in the United States
- Radio: Motor Racing Network

The 1988 Pepsi Firecracker 400 was the 15th stock car race of the 1988 NASCAR Winston Cup Series season and the 30th iteration of the event. The race was held on Saturday, July 2, 1988, before an audience of 83,000 in Daytona Beach, Florida at Daytona International Speedway, a 2.5 miles (4.0 km) permanent triangular-shaped superspeedway. The race took the scheduled 160 laps to complete. In one of the closest finishes in NASCAR Winston Cup Series history, Melling Racing driver Bill Elliott was able to beat out Morgan–McClure Motorsports driver Rick Wilson by a distance of 3 feet (0.91 m) to take his 26th career NASCAR Winston Cup Series victory and his third victory of the season. To fill out the top three, Jackson Bros. Motorsports driver Phil Parsons would finish third.

== Background ==
The layout of Daytona International Speedway, the venue where the race was held.

Daytona International Speedway is one of three superspeedways to hold NASCAR races, the other two being Indianapolis Motor Speedway and Talladega Superspeedway. The standard track at Daytona International Speedway is a four-turn superspeedway that is 2.5 miles (4.0 km) long. The track's turns are banked at 31 degrees, while the front stretch, the location of the finish line, is banked at 18 degrees.

=== Entry list ===
- (R) denotes rookie driver.

#	Driver	Team	Make	Sponsor
0	Delma Cowart	H. L. Waters Racing	Chevrolet	Heywood Grooms Construction
1	Dale Jarrett	Ellington Racing	Buick	Port-A-Lube, Bud Light
2	Ernie Irvan (R)	U.S. Racing	Chevrolet	Kroger
3	Dale Earnhardt	Richard Childress Racing	Chevrolet	GM Goodwrench Service
4	Rick Wilson	Morgan–McClure Motorsports	Oldsmobile	Kodak
5	Geoff Bodine	Hendrick Motorsports	Chevrolet	Levi Garrett
6	Mark Martin	Roush Racing	Ford	Stroh Light
7	Alan Kulwicki	AK Racing	Ford	Zerex
07	Larry Moyer	Stark Racing	Pontiac	Hooters, Just Say No!
8	Bobby Hillin Jr.	Stavola Brothers Racing	Buick	Miller High Life
9	Bill Elliott	Melling Racing	Ford	Coors Light
10	Ken Bouchard (R)	Whitcomb Racing	Ford	Whitcomb Racing
11	Terry Labonte	Junior Johnson & Associates	Chevrolet	Budweiser
12	Mike Alexander	Stavola Brothers Racing	Buick	Miller High Life
14	A. J. Foyt	A. J. Foyt Racing	Oldsmobile	Copenhagen
15	Brett Bodine	Bud Moore Engineering	Ford	Crisco
17	Darrell Waltrip	Hendrick Motorsports	Chevrolet	Tide
21	Kyle Petty	Wood Brothers Racing	Ford	Citgo
23	Eddie Bierschwale	B&B Racing	Oldsmobile	Wayne Paging
25	Ken Schrader	Hendrick Motorsports	Chevrolet	Folgers
26	Ricky Rudd	King Racing	Buick	Quaker State
27	Rusty Wallace	Blue Max Racing	Pontiac	Kodiak
28	Davey Allison	Ranier-Lundy Racing	Ford	Havoline
29	Cale Yarborough	Cale Yarborough Motorsports	Oldsmobile	Hardee's
30	Michael Waltrip	Bahari Racing	Pontiac	Country Time
31	Joe Ruttman	Bob Clark Motorsports	Oldsmobile	Slender You Figure Salons
32	Philip Duffie	Duffie Racing	Buick	Bob Beard Buick
33	Morgan Shepherd	Mach 1 Racing	Chevrolet	Skoal Bandit
37	Patty Moise	Randy Hope Motorsports	Buick	Crisco Butter Flavor
38	Ricky Woodward	Wangerin Racing	Ford	Wangerin Racing
39	Blackie Wangerin	Wangerin Racing	Ford	Wangerin Racing
43	Richard Petty	Petty Enterprises	Pontiac	STP
44	Sterling Marlin	Hagan Racing	Oldsmobile	Piedmont Airlines
50	Greg Sacks	Dingman Brothers Racing	Pontiac	Dingman Brothers Racing
52	Jimmy Means	Jimmy Means Racing	Pontiac	Eureka
54	Ronnie Sanders	Gray Racing	Chevrolet	Gray Racing
55	Phil Parsons	Jackson Bros. Motorsports	Oldsmobile	Crown Central Petroleum, Skoal
59	Mark Gibson	Gibson Racing	Pontiac	Gibson Racing
67	Buddy Arrington	Arrington Racing	Ford	Pannill Sweatshirts
68	Derrike Cope	Testa Racing	Ford	Purolator Filters
71	Dave Marcis	Marcis Auto Racing	Chevrolet	Lifebuoy
73	Phil Barkdoll	Barkdoll Racing	Ford	Helen Rae Special
75	Neil Bonnett	RahMoc Enterprises	Pontiac	Valvoline
76	Hut Stricklin	Jaehne Motorsports	Pontiac	Jaehne Motorsports
77	Ken Ragan	Ragan Racing	Ford	Circle Bar Truck Stop, Bob Beard Ford
80	Jimmy Horton (R)	S&H Racing	Ford	S&H Racing
83	Lake Speed	Speed Racing	Oldsmobile	Wynn's, Kmart
86	Rick Jeffrey	Jeffrey Racing	Chevrolet	Slenderizers
88	Buddy Baker	Baker-Schiff Racing	Oldsmobile	Red Baron Frozen Pizza
90	Benny Parsons	Donlavey Racing	Ford	Bull's-Eye Barbecue Sauce
97	Rodney Combs	Winkle Motorsports	Buick	AC Spark Plug
98	Brad Noffsinger (R)	Curb Racing	Buick	Sunoco

== Qualifying ==
Qualifying was split into two rounds. The first round was held on Thursday, June 30, at 10:00 AM EST. Each driver would have one lap to set a time. During the first round, the top 20 drivers in the round would be guaranteed a starting spot in the race. If a driver was not able to guarantee a spot in the first round, they had the option to scrub their time from the first round and try and run a faster lap time in a second round qualifying run, held on Friday, July 1, at 11:00 AM EST. As with the first round, each driver would have one lap to set a time. For this specific race, positions 21-40 would be decided on time, and depending on who needed it, a select amount of positions were given to cars who had not otherwise qualified but were high enough in owner's points; up to two provisionals were given.

Darrell Waltrip, driving for Hendrick Motorsports, would win the pole, setting a time of 46.435 and an average speed of 193.819 miles per hour (311.921 km/h) in the first round.

Ten drivers would fail to qualify.

=== Full qualifying results ===
Pos.	#	Driver	Team	Make	Time	Speed
1	17	Darrell Waltrip	Hendrick Motorsports	Chevrolet	46.435	193.819
2	21	Kyle Petty	Wood Brothers Racing	Ford	46.959	191.657
3	28	Davey Allison	Ranier-Lundy Racing	Ford	47.072	191.196
4	25	Ken Schrader	Hendrick Motorsports	Chevrolet	47.102	191.075
5	75	Neil Bonnett	RahMoc Enterprises	Pontiac	47.145	190.900
6	55	Phil Parsons	Jackson Bros. Motorsports	Oldsmobile	47.157	190.852
7	44	Sterling Marlin	Hagan Racing	Oldsmobile	47.384	189.938
8	33	Morgan Shepherd	Mach 1 Racing	Chevrolet	47.388	189.921
9	88	Buddy Baker	Baker–Schiff Racing	Oldsmobile	47.465	189.613
10	5	Geoff Bodine	Hendrick Motorsports	Chevrolet	47.540	189.314
11	8	Bobby Hillin Jr.	Stavola Brothers Racing	Buick	47.548	189.282
12	26	Ricky Rudd	King Racing	Buick	47.671	188.794
13	31	Joe Ruttman	Bob Clark Motorsports	Oldsmobile	47.715	188.620
14	11	Terry Labonte	Junior Johnson & Associates	Chevrolet	47.718	188.608
15	12	Mike Alexander	Stavola Brothers Racing	Buick	47.734	188.545
16	52	Jimmy Means	Jimmy Means Racing	Pontiac	47.769	188.407
17	1	Dale Jarrett	Ellington Racing	Buick	47.802	188.277
18	14	A. J. Foyt	A. J. Foyt Racing	Oldsmobile	47.847	188.100
19	27	Rusty Wallace	Blue Max Racing	Pontiac	47.890	187.931
20	3	Dale Earnhardt	Richard Childress Racing	Chevrolet	47.890	187.931
Failed to lock in Round 1
21	7	Alan Kulwicki	AK Racing	Ford	48.012	187.453
22	6	Mark Martin	Roush Racing	Ford	48.020	187.422
23	67	Buddy Arrington	Arrington Racing	Chevrolet	48.114	187.056
24	23	Eddie Bierschwale	B&B Racing	Oldsmobile	48.131	186.990
25	29	Cale Yarborough	Cale Yarborough Motorsports	Oldsmobile	48.145	186.935
26	4	Rick Wilson	Morgan–McClure Motorsports	Oldsmobile	48.150	186.916
27	43	Richard Petty	Petty Enterprises	Pontiac	48.293	186.362
28	90	Benny Parsons	Donlavey Racing	Ford	48.364	186.089
29	10	Ken Bouchard (R)	Whitcomb Racing	Ford	48.416	185.889
30	30	Michael Waltrip	Bahari Racing	Pontiac	48.578	185.269
31	2	Ernie Irvan (R)	U.S. Racing	Chevrolet	48.586	185.239
32	50	Greg Sacks	Dingman Brothers Racing	Pontiac	48.629	185.075
33	37	Patty Moise	Randy Hope Motorsports	Buick	48.659	184.961
34	07	Larry Moyer	Stark Racing	Pontiac	48.670	184.919
35	68	Derrike Cope	Testa Racing	Ford	48.689	184.847
36	77	Ken Ragan	Ragan Racing	Ford	48.707	184.778
37	83	Lake Speed	Speed Racing	Oldsmobile	48.721	184.725
38	9	Bill Elliott	Melling Racing	Ford	48.780	184.502
39	71	Dave Marcis	Marcis Auto Racing	Chevrolet	48.781	184.498
40	86	Rick Jeffrey	Jeffrey Racing	Chevrolet	48.866	184.177
Provisionals
41	15	Brett Bodine	Bud Moore Engineering	Ford	48.922	183.966
42	97	Rodney Combs	Winkle Motorsports	Buick	48.974	183.771
Failed to qualify
43	80	Jimmy Horton (R)	S&H Racing	Ford	48.902	184.042
44	59	Mark Gibson	Gibson Racing	Pontiac	48.926	183.951
45	32	Philip Duffie	Duffie Racing	Buick	49.134	183.173
46	76	Hut Stricklin	Jaehne Motorsports	Pontiac	49.190	182.964
47	73	Phil Barkdoll	Barkdoll Racing	Ford	49.357	182.345
48	98	Brad Noffsinger (R)	Curb Racing	Buick	49.543	181.660
49	54	Ronnie Sanders	Gray Racing	Chevrolet	49.670	181.196
50	38	Ricky Woodward	Wangerin Racing	Ford	50.360	178.713
51	39	Blackie Wangerin	Wangerin Racing	Ford	50.454	178.380
52	0	Delma Cowart	H. L. Waters Racing	Chevrolet	51.264	175.562
Official first round qualifying results
Official starting lineup

== Race results ==
Fin	St	#	Driver	Team	Make	Laps	Led	Status	Pts	Winnings
1	38	9	Bill Elliott	Melling Racing	Ford	160	23	running	180	$63,500
2	26	4	Rick Wilson	Morgan–McClure Motorsports	Oldsmobile	160	19	running	175	$45,825
3	6	55	Phil Parsons	Jackson Bros. Motorsports	Oldsmobile	160	17	running	170	$22,250
4	20	3	Dale Earnhardt	Richard Childress Racing	Chevrolet	160	53	running	170	$22,825
5	1	17	Darrell Waltrip	Hendrick Motorsports	Chevrolet	160	13	running	160	$25,430
6	9	88	Buddy Baker	Baker–Schiff Racing	Oldsmobile	160	8	running	155	$14,185
7	8	33	Morgan Shepherd	Mach 1 Racing	Chevrolet	160	0	running	146	$12,835
8	4	25	Ken Schrader	Hendrick Motorsports	Chevrolet	160	10	running	147	$16,435
9	37	83	Lake Speed	Speed Racing	Oldsmobile	159	0	running	138	$8,660
10	32	50	Greg Sacks	Dingman Brothers Racing	Pontiac	159	0	running	134	$7,535
11	13	31	Joe Ruttman	Bob Clark Motorsports	Oldsmobile	159	0	running	130	$7,325
12	19	27	Rusty Wallace	Blue Max Racing	Pontiac	159	0	running	127	$13,940
13	11	8	Bobby Hillin Jr.	Stavola Brothers Racing	Buick	159	0	running	124	$8,720
14	17	1	Dale Jarrett	Ellington Racing	Buick	159	0	running	121	$4,705
15	15	12	Mike Alexander	Stavola Brothers Racing	Buick	159	0	running	0	$12,090
16	10	5	Geoff Bodine	Hendrick Motorsports	Chevrolet	159	0	running	115	$7,885
17	22	6	Mark Martin	Roush Racing	Ford	159	0	running	117	$5,380
18	5	75	Neil Bonnett	RahMoc Enterprises	Pontiac	159	0	running	109	$10,930
19	14	11	Terry Labonte	Junior Johnson & Associates	Chevrolet	159	0	running	106	$10,680
20	27	43	Richard Petty	Petty Enterprises	Pontiac	159	0	running	103	$7,230
21	30	30	Michael Waltrip	Bahari Racing	Pontiac	158	0	running	100	$6,380
22	12	26	Ricky Rudd	King Racing	Buick	158	2	running	102	$6,230
23	39	71	Dave Marcis	Marcis Auto Racing	Chevrolet	158	0	running	94	$6,005
24	2	21	Kyle Petty	Wood Brothers Racing	Ford	158	0	running	91	$10,555
25	31	2	Ernie Irvan (R)	U.S. Racing	Chevrolet	156	0	running	88	$3,805
26	33	37	Patty Moise	Randy Hope Motorsports	Buick	156	0	running	85	$2,905
27	16	52	Jimmy Means	Jimmy Means Racing	Pontiac	155	0	running	82	$5,480
28	23	67	Buddy Arrington	Arrington Racing	Chevrolet	153	0	running	79	$4,630
29	40	86	Rick Jeffrey	Jeffrey Racing	Chevrolet	152	0	running	76	$2,805
30	36	77	Ken Ragan	Ragan Racing	Ford	150	0	running	73	$2,980
31	24	23	Eddie Bierschwale	B&B Racing	Oldsmobile	150	0	running	70	$2,380
32	34	07	Larry Moyer	Stark Racing	Pontiac	148	0	running	67	$2,355
33	42	97	Rodney Combs	Winkle Motorsports	Buick	141	0	running	64	$2,330
34	7	44	Sterling Marlin	Hagan Racing	Oldsmobile	130	15	crash	66	$5,755
35	28	90	Benny Parsons	Donlavey Racing	Ford	123	0	running	58	$5,655
36	29	10	Ken Bouchard (R)	Whitcomb Racing	Ford	82	0	running	55	$2,355
37	18	14	A. J. Foyt	A. J. Foyt Racing	Oldsmobile	72	0	engine	52	$2,230
38	3	28	Davey Allison	Ranier-Lundy Racing	Ford	43	0	engine	49	$11,865
39	35	68	Derrike Cope	Testa Racing	Ford	2	0	crash	46	$4,840
40	21	7	Alan Kulwicki	AK Racing	Ford	1	0	engine	43	$4,790
41	25	29	Cale Yarborough	Cale Yarborough Motorsports	Oldsmobile	1	0	crash	40	$2,765
42	41	15	Brett Bodine	Bud Moore Engineering	Ford	1	0	crash	37	$10,765
Failed to qualify
43		80	Jimmy Horton (R)	S&H Racing	Ford					
44		59	Mark Gibson	Gibson Racing	Pontiac					
45		32	Philip Duffie	Duffie Racing	Buick					
46		76	Hut Stricklin	Jaehne Motorsports	Pontiac					
47		73	Phil Barkdoll	Barkdoll Racing	Ford					
48		98	Brad Noffsinger (R)	Curb Racing	Buick					
49		54	Ronnie Sanders	Gray Racing	Chevrolet					
50		38	Ricky Woodward	Wangerin Racing	Ford					
51		39	Blackie Wangerin	Wangerin Racing	Ford					
52		0	Delma Cowart	H. L. Waters Racing	Chevrolet					
Official race results

== Standings after the race ==
Drivers' Championship standings

	Pos	Driver	Points
	1	Rusty Wallace	2,272
	2	Dale Earnhardt	2,185 (-87)
	3	Bill Elliott	2,175 (-97)
	4	Terry Labonte	2,045 (–227)
	5	Ken Schrader	1,976 (–296)
2	6	Phil Parsons	1,932 (–340)
1	7	Geoff Bodine	1,929 (–343)
1	8	Darrell Waltrip	1,894 (–378)
2	9	Sterling Marlin	1,874 (–398)
	10	Bobby Hillin Jr.	1,847 (–425)
Official driver's standings

- Note: Only the first 10 positions are included for the driver standings.

Previous race: 1988 Miller High Life 400 (Michigan)	NASCAR Winston Cup Series; 1988 season	Next race: 1988 AC Spark Plug 500
