= 1989 Daytona 500 =

First race of the 1989 NASCAR Winston Cup Series

Race details
- Race 1 of 29 in the 1989 NASCAR Winston Cup Series
- The 1989 Daytona 500 program cover, featuring Bill Elliott.
- Date: February 19, 1989
- Official name: 31st Annual Daytona 500
- Location: Daytona Beach, Florida, Daytona International Speedway
- Course: Permanent racing facility
- Course length: 2.5 miles (4.0 km)
- Distance: 200 laps, 500 mi (804.672 km)
- Average speed: 148.466 miles per hour (238.933 km/h)
- Attendance: 150,000

Pole position
Driver	Ken Schrader	Hendrick Motorsports
- Time: 45.686

Most laps led
Driver	Ken Schrader	Hendrick Motorsports
- Laps: 114

Winner
No. 17	Darrell Waltrip	Hendrick Motorsports

Television in the United States
- Network: CBS
- Announcers: Ken Squier, Chris Economaki, Ned Jarrett

Radio in the United States
- Radio: Motor Racing Network

The 1989 Daytona 500 was the first stock car race of the 1989 NASCAR Winston Cup Series season and the 31st iteration of the event. The race was held on Sunday, February 19, 1989, before an audience of 150,000 in Daytona Beach, Florida at Daytona International Speedway, a 2.5 miles (4.0 km) permanent triangular-shaped superspeedway. The race took the scheduled 200 laps to complete. Gambling on fuel mileage, Hendrick Motorsports driver Darrell Waltrip would manage to run the last 53 laps on one tank of fuel to take his 74th career NASCAR Winston Cup Series victory, his first and only Daytona 500 victory, and his first victory of the season. To fill out the top three, Hendrick Motorsports driver Ken Schrader and Richard Childress Racing driver Dale Earnhardt would finish second and third, respectively.

== Background ==
The layout of Daytona International Speedway, the venue where the race was held.

Daytona International Speedway is one of three superspeedways to hold NASCAR races, the other two being Indianapolis Motor Speedway and Talladega Superspeedway. The standard track at Daytona International Speedway is a four-turn superspeedway that is 2.5 miles (4.0 km) long. The track's turns are banked at 31 degrees, while the front stretch, the location of the finish line, is banked at 18 degrees.

=== Entry list ===
- (R) denotes rookie driver.

#	Driver	Team	Make	Sponsor
0	Delma Cowart	H. L. Waters Racing	Chevrolet	J. W. Exley Lumber
1	Doug Heveron	Ellington Racing	Buick	Ellington Racing
2	Ernie Irvan	U.S. Racing	Pontiac	Kroger
3	Dale Earnhardt	Richard Childress Racing	Chevrolet	GM Goodwrench Service Plus
4	Rick Wilson	Morgan–McClure Motorsports	Oldsmobile	Kodak
5	Geoff Bodine	Hendrick Motorsports	Chevrolet	Levi Garrett
6	Mark Martin	Roush Racing	Ford	Stroh's Light
7	Alan Kulwicki	AK Racing	Ford	Zerex
8	Bobby Hillin Jr.	Stavola Brothers Racing	Buick	Miller High Life
9	Bill Elliott	Melling Racing	Ford	Coors Light
10	Ken Bouchard	Whitcomb Racing	Pontiac	Simoniz
11	Terry Labonte	Junior Johnson & Associates	Ford	Budweiser
14	A. J. Foyt	A. J. Foyt Racing	Oldsmobile	Copenhagen
15	Brett Bodine	Bud Moore Engineering	Ford	Motorcraft
16	Larry Pearson (R)	Pearson Racing	Buick	Chattanooga Chew
17	Darrell Waltrip	Hendrick Motorsports	Chevrolet	Tide
19	Ronnie Sanders	Gray Racing	Chevrolet	Hamby Chevrolet
21	Neil Bonnett	Wood Brothers Racing	Ford	Citgo
23	Eddie Bierschwale	B&B Racing	Oldsmobile	Peak Antifreeze
25	Ken Schrader	Hendrick Motorsports	Chevrolet	Folgers
26	Ricky Rudd	King Racing	Buick	Quaker State
27	Rusty Wallace	Blue Max Racing	Pontiac	Kodiak
28	Davey Allison	Robert Yates Racing	Ford	Texaco, Havoline
29	Dale Jarrett	Cale Yarborough Motorsports	Pontiac	Hardee's
30	Michael Waltrip	Bahari Racing	Pontiac	Country Time
31	Jim Sauter	Bob Clark Motorsports	Pontiac	Slender You Figure Salons
32	Philip Duffie	Duffie Racing	Buick	Bob Beard Buick
33	Harry Gant	Jackson Bros. Motorsports	Oldsmobile	Skoal Bandit
34	Charlie Glotzbach	AAG Racing	Buick	Allen's Glass
39	Ricky Woodward	Wangerin Racing	Ford	Moen Incorporated
40	Ben Hess (R)	Hess Racing	Oldsmobile	Hess Racing
41	Jim Bown	Bown Racing	Chevrolet	Rose Auto Wrecking
42	Kyle Petty	SABCO Racing	Pontiac	Peak Antifreeze
43	Richard Petty	Petty Enterprises	Pontiac	STP
45	Joe Ruttman	CalCar Motorsports	Pontiac	Schaefer Beer, Machinists Union
48	Mickey Gibbs (Note: In a practice session on Tuesday, February 14, Mickey Gibbs would crash his car beyond repair. As Winkle Motorsports did not have a backup car, the team withdrew, with Gibbs negotiating a deal to buy out Brad Teague's ride and qualifying time from Saturday, February 11, from team owner Buddy Arrington. In Gibbs' qualifying race, Gibbs would crash Arrington's car beyond repair, but was still able to qualify for the race using the speed that Teague had set. Negotiating a deal with an owner-driver who did not qualify for the race, Jimmy Means, Gibbs would agree to rent out Means' car in order to race the event.) (R)	Winkle Motorsports	Pontiac	GMAC
49	Tony Spanos	Hylton Motorsports	Buick	Hylton Motorsports
52	Jimmy Means	Jimmy Means Racing	Pontiac	Alka-Seltzer
55	Phil Parsons	Jackson Bros. Motorsports	Oldsmobile	Skoal, Crown Central Petroleum
57	Hut Stricklin (R)	Osterlund Racing	Pontiac	Heinz
59	Mark Gibson	Gibson Racing	Pontiac	Ingalls Construction
66	Rick Mast (R)	Mach 1 Racing	Chevrolet	Mach 1 Racing
67	Brad Teague	Arrington Racing	Pontiac	Arrington Racing
68	Derrike Cope	Testa Racing	Pontiac	Purolator
69	Lee Raymond	LC Racing	Ford	LC Racing
70	J. D. McDuffie	McDuffie Racing	Pontiac	Rumple Furniture
71	Dave Marcis	Marcis Auto Racing	Chevrolet	Lifebuoy
73	Phil Barkdoll	Barkdoll Racing	Oldsmobile	Barkdoll Racing
74	Randy LaJoie	Wawak Racing	Pontiac	Wawak Racing
75	Morgan Shepherd	RahMoc Enterprises	Pontiac	Valvoline
77	Connie Saylor	Ragan Racing	Ford	Ragan Racing
80	Jimmy Horton	S&H Racing	Pontiac	Miles Concrete
83	Lake Speed	Speed Racing	Oldsmobile	Kraft Dinner
84	Mike Alexander	Stavola Brothers Racing	Buick	Miller High Life
85	Bobby Gerhart	Bobby Gerhart Racing	Chevrolet	James Chevrolet
88	Greg Sacks	Baker–Schiff Racing	Pontiac	Crisco
89	Rodney Combs	Mueller Brothers Racing	Pontiac	Evinrude Outboard Motors
90	Chad Little (R)	Donlavey Racing	Ford	Purolator
93	Charlie Baker	Salmon Racing	Chevrolet	Salmon Racing
94	Sterling Marlin	Hagan Racing	Oldsmobile	Sunoco
95	Trevor Boys	Sadler Racing	Chevrolet	Sadler Racing

== Qualifying ==
Qualifying was set by the 1989 Twin 125 Qualifiers. The top two positions were set by qualifying speeds held for the Twin 125 Qualifiers held on Saturday, February 11, with the top two qualifiers in the session earning the top two positions for the Daytona 500. The rest of the starting was set in the Twin 125 Qualifiers, held on Thursday, February 16 during two races. The top 14 finishers in the first race, excluding the pole position winner, would set the inside row from rows two to 15, and the top 14 finishers in the second race, excluding the outside pole position winner, would set the outside row from rows two to 15. The remaining non-qualifiers would set positions 31-40 based on qualifying speeds from the first qualifying session held on Saturday. If needed, up to two extra provisionals were given to teams high enough in the previous season's owner's standings that did not qualify for the race by either qualifying speed or from the Twin 125 Qualifiers.

Ken Schrader, driving for Hendrick Motorsports, would win the pole, setting a time of 45.686 and an average speed of 196.996 miles per hour (317.034 km/h) in Saturday's session.

18 drivers would fail to qualify.

=== Full qualifying results ===
Pos.	#	Driver	Team	Make	Reason
1	25	Ken Schrader	Hendrick Motorsports	Chevrolet	Qualified on pole
2	17	Darrell Waltrip	Hendrick Motorsports	Chevrolet	Qualified on outside pole
3	75	Morgan Shepherd	RahMoc Enterprises	Pontiac	Second in Twin 125 #1
4	11	Terry Labonte	Junior Johnson & Associates	Ford	First in Twin 125 #2
5	6	Mark Martin	Roush Racing	Ford	Third in Twin 125 #1
6	94	Sterling Marlin	Hagan Racing	Oldsmobile	Second in Twin 125 #2
7	55	Phil Parsons	Jackson Bros. Motorsports	Oldsmobile	Fourth in Twin 125 #1
8	3	Dale Earnhardt	Richard Childress Racing	Chevrolet	Third in Twin 125 #2
9	7	Alan Kulwicki	AK Racing	Ford	Fifth in Twin 125 #1
10	5	Geoff Bodine	Hendrick Motorsports	Chevrolet	Fourth in Twin 125 #2
11	66	Rick Mast (R)	Mach 1 Racing	Chevrolet	Sixth in Twin 125 #1
12	33	Harry Gant	Jackson Bros. Motorsports	Oldsmobile	Fifth in Twin 125 #2
13	9	Bill Elliott	Melling Racing	Ford	Seventh in Twin 125 #1
14	16	Larry Pearson (R)	Pearson Racing	Buick	Sixth in Twin 125 #2
15	10	Ken Bouchard	Whitcomb Racing	Pontiac	Eighth in Twin 125 #1
16	28	Davey Allison	Robert Yates Racing	Ford	Seventh in Twin 125 #2
17	45	Joe Ruttman	CalCar Motorsports	Pontiac	Ninth in Twin 125 #1
18	15	Brett Bodine	Bud Moore Engineering	Ford	Ninth in Twin 125 #2
19	71	Dave Marcis	Marcis Auto Racing	Chevrolet	Tenth in Twin 125 #1
20	29	Dale Jarrett	Cale Yarborough Motorsports	Pontiac	Tenth in Twin 125 #2
21	69	Lee Raymond	LC Racing	Ford	11th in Twin 125 #1
22	84	Mike Alexander	Stavola Brothers Racing	Buick	11th in Twin 125 #2
23	30	Michael Waltrip	Bahari Racing	Pontiac	12th in Twin 125 #1
24	14	A. J. Foyt	A. J. Foyt Racing	Oldsmobile	12th in Twin 125 #2
25	93	Charlie Baker	Salmon Racing	Chevrolet	13th in Twin 125 #1
26	8	Bobby Hillin Jr.	Stavola Brothers Racing	Buick	13th in Twin 125 #2
27	19	Ronnie Sanders	Gray Racing	Chevrolet	14th in Twin 125 #1
28	90	Chad Little (R)	Donlavey Racing	Ford	14th in Twin 125 #2
29	70	J. D. McDuffie	McDuffie Racing	Pontiac	15th in Twin 125 #1
30	89	Rodney Combs	Mueller Brothers Racing	Pontiac	15th in Twin 125 #2
31	73	Phil Barkdoll	Barkdoll Racing	Oldsmobile	Speed provisional (191.906)
32	40	Ben Hess (R)	Hess Racing	Oldsmobile	Speed provisional (191.217)
33	2	Ernie Irvan	U.S. Racing	Pontiac	Speed provisional (190.585)
34	43	Richard Petty	Petty Enterprises	Pontiac	Owner's points provisional
35	27	Rusty Wallace	Blue Max Racing	Pontiac	Speed provisional (190.694)
36	26	Ricky Rudd	King Racing	Buick	Owner's points provisional
37	88	Greg Sacks	Baker–Schiff Racing	Pontiac	Speed provisional (190.521)
38	21	Neil Bonnett	Wood Brothers Racing	Ford	Speed provisional (194.611)
39	83	Lake Speed	Speed Racing	Oldsmobile	Speed provisional (192.230)
40	4	Rick Wilson	Morgan–McClure Motorsports	Oldsmobile	Speed provisional (192.287)
41	23	Eddie Bierschwale	B&B Racing	Oldsmobile	Speed provisional (191.583)
42	67	Mickey Gibbs (R)	Arrington Racing	Pontiac	Speed provisional (190.428)
Failed to qualify or withdrew
43	74	Randy LaJoie	Wawak Racing	Pontiac	16th in Twin 125 #1
44	42	Kyle Petty	SABCO Racing	Pontiac	17th in Twin 125 #2
45	57	Hut Stricklin (R)	Osterlund Racing	Pontiac	17th in Twin 125 #1
46	59	Mark Gibson	Gibson Racing	Pontiac	18th in Twin 125 #1
47	41	Jim Bown	Bown Racing	Chevrolet	18th in Twin 125 #2
48	77	Connie Saylor	Ragan Racing	Ford	19th in Twin 125 #2
49	80	Jimmy Horton	S&H Racing	Pontiac	19th in Twin 125 #1
50	52	Jimmy Means	Jimmy Means Racing	Pontiac	20th in Twin 125 #2
51	34	Charlie Glotzbach	AAG Racing	Buick	25th in Twin 125 #1
52	85	Bobby Gerhart	Bobby Gerhart Racing	Chevrolet	22nd in Twin 125 #2
53	49	Tony Spanos	Hylton Motorsports	Buick	26th in Twin 125 #1
54	31	Jim Sauter	Bob Clark Motorsports	Pontiac	23rd in Twin 125 #2
55	0	Delma Cowart	H. L. Waters Racing	Chevrolet	27th in Twin 125 #1
56	68	Derrike Cope	Testa Racing	Pontiac	24th in Twin 125 #2
57	32	Philip Duffie	Duffie Racing	Buick	25th in Twin 125 #2
58	95	Trevor Boys	Sadler Racing	Chevrolet	27th in Twin 125 #2
59	1	Doug Heveron	Ellington Racing	Buick	29th in Twin 125 #2
60	39	Ricky Woodward	Wangerin Racing	Ford	30th in Twin 125 #2
WD	48	Mickey Gibbs (R)	Winkle Motorsports	Pontiac	Lack of backup car
Official Twin 125 Qualifiers results
Official starting lineup

== Race results ==
Fin	St	#	Driver	Team	Make	Laps	Led	Status	Pts	Winnings
1	2	17	Darrell Waltrip	Hendrick Motorsports	Chevrolet	200	25	running	180	$184,900
2	1	25	Ken Schrader	Hendrick Motorsports	Chevrolet	200	114	running	180	$182,700
3	8	3	Dale Earnhardt	Richard Childress Racing	Chevrolet	200	3	running	170	$95,550
4	10	5	Geoff Bodine	Hendrick Motorsports	Chevrolet	200	9	running	165	$79,250
5	7	55	Phil Parsons	Jackson Bros. Motorsports	Oldsmobile	200	12	running	160	$70,325
6	11	66	Rick Mast (R)	Mach 1 Racing	Chevrolet	200	9	running	155	$52,525
7	9	7	Alan Kulwicki	AK Racing	Ford	200	6	running	151	$52,325
8	40	4	Rick Wilson	Morgan–McClure Motorsports	Oldsmobile	200	7	running	147	$47,325
9	4	11	Terry Labonte	Junior Johnson & Associates	Ford	200	3	running	143	$68,400
10	41	23	Eddie Bierschwale	B&B Racing	Oldsmobile	200	2	running	139	$31,725
11	6	94	Sterling Marlin	Hagan Racing	Oldsmobile	199	0	running	130	$47,325
12	12	33	Harry Gant	Jackson Bros. Motorsports	Oldsmobile	199	0	running	127	$30,000
13	17	45	Joe Ruttman	CalCar Motorsports	Pontiac	199	0	running	0	$24,505
14	14	16	Larry Pearson (R)	Pearson Racing	Buick	199	0	running	121	$23,915
15	3	75	Morgan Shepherd	RahMoc Enterprises	Pontiac	199	0	running	118	$44,900
16	15	10	Ken Bouchard	Whitcomb Racing	Pontiac	198	0	running	115	$23,180
17	34	43	Richard Petty	Petty Enterprises	Pontiac	198	0	running	112	$19,335
18	35	27	Rusty Wallace	Blue Max Racing	Pontiac	197	0	running	109	$24,790
19	36	26	Ricky Rudd	King Racing	Buick	197	2	running	111	$19,120
20	19	71	Dave Marcis	Marcis Auto Racing	Chevrolet	197	1	running	108	$20,785
21	23	30	Michael Waltrip	Bahari Racing	Pontiac	197	1	running	105	$18,825
22	32	40	Ben Hess (R)	Hess Racing	Oldsmobile	196	0	running	97	$14,300
23	37	88	Greg Sacks	Baker–Schiff Racing	Pontiac	196	0	running	94	$15,595
24	29	70	J. D. McDuffie	McDuffie Racing	Pontiac	193	0	running	91	$13,640
25	16	28	Davey Allison	Robert Yates Racing	Ford	193	0	running	88	$22,985
26	21	69	Lee Raymond	LC Racing	Ford	189	0	running	0	$13,530
27	22	84	Mike Alexander	Stavola Brothers Racing	Buick	188	0	running	82	$16,275
28	27	19	Ronnie Sanders	Gray Racing	Chevrolet	184	0	running	79	$12,570
29	18	15	Brett Bodine	Bud Moore Engineering	Ford	177	0	valve	76	$16,015
30	39	83	Lake Speed	Speed Racing	Oldsmobile	150	0	running	73	$14,010
31	31	73	Phil Barkdoll	Barkdoll Racing	Oldsmobile	143	2	accident	75	$10,855
32	20	29	Dale Jarrett	Cale Yarborough Motorsports	Pontiac	131	0	running	67	$15,000
33	5	6	Mark Martin	Roush Racing	Ford	110	0	accident	64	$23,445
34	42	67	Mickey Gibbs (R)	Arrington Racing	Pontiac	76	0	engine	61	$9,940
35	13	9	Bill Elliott	Melling Racing	Ford	72	0	accident	58	$24,310
36	28	90	Chad Little (R)	Donlavey Racing	Ford	72	0	accident	55	$11,605
37	30	89	Rodney Combs	Mueller Brothers Racing	Pontiac	72	0	accident	52	$10,650
38	24	14	A. J. Foyt	A. J. Foyt Racing	Oldsmobile	41	4	shocks	54	$11,970
39	26	8	Bobby Hillin Jr.	Stavola Brothers Racing	Buick	39	0	accident	46	$13,335
40	25	93	Charlie Baker	Salmon Racing	Chevrolet	39	0	accident	43	$10,450
41	33	2	Ernie Irvan	U.S. Racing	Pontiac	8	0	engine	40	$9,275
42	38	21	Neil Bonnett	Wood Brothers Racing	Ford	2	0	oil line	37	$11,800
Failed to qualify or withdrew
43		74	Randy LaJoie	Wawak Racing	Pontiac					
44		42	Kyle Petty	SABCO Racing	Pontiac					
45		57	Hut Stricklin (R)	Osterlund Racing	Pontiac					
46		59	Mark Gibson	Gibson Racing	Pontiac					
47		41	Jim Bown	Bown Racing	Chevrolet					
48		77	Connie Saylor	Ragan Racing	Ford					
49		80	Jimmy Horton	S&H Racing	Pontiac					
50		52	Jimmy Means	Jimmy Means Racing	Pontiac					
51		34	Charlie Glotzbach	AAG Racing	Buick					
52		85	Bobby Gerhart	Bobby Gerhart Racing	Chevrolet					
53		49	Tony Spanos	Hylton Motorsports	Buick					
54		31	Jim Sauter	Bob Clark Motorsports	Pontiac					
55		0	Delma Cowart	H. L. Waters Racing	Chevrolet					
56		68	Derrike Cope	Testa Racing	Pontiac					
57		32	Philip Duffie	Duffie Racing	Buick					
58		95	Trevor Boys	Sadler Racing	Chevrolet					
59		1	Doug Heveron	Ellington Racing	Buick					
60		39	Ricky Woodward	Wangerin Racing	Ford					
WD		48	Mickey Gibbs (R)	Winkle Motorsports	Pontiac					
Official race results

== Standings after the race ==
Drivers' Championship standings

Pos	Driver	Points
1	Darrell Waltrip	180 (1st)
2	Ken Schrader	180 (2nd)
3	Dale Earnhardt	170 (-10)
4	Geoff Bodine	165 (–15)
5	Phil Parsons	160 (–20)
6	Rick Mast	155 (–25)
7	Alan Kulwicki	151 (–29)
8	Rick Wilson	147 (–34)
9	Terry Labonte	143 (–37)
10	Eddie Bierschwale	139 (–41)
Official driver's standings

- Note: Only the first 10 positions are included for the driver standings.

== Notes ==
Previous race: 1988 Atlanta Journal 500	NASCAR Winston Cup Series; 1989 season	Next race: 1989 Goodwrench 500
