= Ricky Woodward =

American racing driver

- Born: December 1, 1953 (age 72); Martinez, Georgia, U.S.

ARCA Menards Series career
- 1 race run over 1 year
- Best finish: 20th-101st (points not recorded past 20th) (1988)
- First race: 1988 Talladega ARCA 500k (Talladega)
Wins	Top tens	Poles
0	0	0
- Statistics up to date as of December 31, 2024.

Ricky Woodward (born December 1, 1953) is an American former professional stock car racing driver who has previously competed in the ARCA Re/Max Series and the NASCAR Goody's Dash Series.

Blackstock has also competed in series such as the Stacker 2 Xtreme DirtCar Series, the Southern All Star Dirt Racing Series, the Carolina Clash Super Late Model Series, and the 602 Bandit Series.

== Motorsports career results ==
=== NASCAR ===
(key) (Bold - Pole position awarded by qualifying time. Italics - Pole position earned by points standings or practice time. * – Most laps led.)

==== Winston Cup Series ====
NASCAR Winston Cup Series results
Year	Team	No.	Make	1	2	3	4	5	6	7	8	9	10	11	12	13	14	15	16	17	18	19	20	21	22	23	24	25	26	27	28	29	NWCC	Pts	Ref
1988	N/A	N/A	N/A	DAY	RCH	CAR	ATL	DAR	BRI	NWS	MAR	TAL	CLT	DOV	RSD	POC	MCH	DAY; DNQ	POC	TAL	GLN	MCH	BRI	DAR; DNQ	RCH	DOV	MAR	CLT	NWS	CAR	PHO	ATL	N/A	0	
1989	Wangerin Racing	39	Ford	DAY; DNQ	CAR	ATL	RCH	DAR	BRI	NWS	MAR	TAL	CLT	DOV	SON	POC	MCH	DAY	POC	TAL	GLN	MCH	BRI	DAR	RCH	DOV	MAR	CLT	NWS	CAR	PHO	ATL	N/A	0	

===== Daytona 500 =====
Year	Team	Manufacturer	Start	Finish
1989	Wangerin Racing	Ford	DNQ	

==== Goody's Dash Series ====
NASCAR Goody's Dash Series results
Year	Team	No.	Make	1	2	3	4	5	6	7	8	9	10	11	12	13	14	15	16	17	18	NGDS	Pts	Ref
1999	N/A	20	Pontiac	DAY	HCY	CAR	CLT	BRI	LOU	SUM	GRE	ROU	STA	MYB	HCY	LAN	USA; 24	JAC	LAN			N/A	0	
2000	N/A	20	Pontiac	DAY	MON; 14	STA; 13	JAC; 16	CAR; 24	CLT; 38	SBO; 9	ROU; 18	LOU	SUM; 19	GRE; 27	SNM; 13	MYB; 24	BRI; 8	HCY; 16	JAC; 13	USA; 33	LAN	19th	1596	
2001	N/A	20	Pontiac	DAY; 41	ROU	DAR; 24	CLT; 30	LOU	JAC	KEN	SBO	DAY; 33	GRE; 28	SNM	NRV	MYB	BRI	ACE	JAC	USA	NSH; 24	38th	438	

=== ARCA Permatex SuperCar Series ===
(key) (Bold – Pole position awarded by qualifying time. Italics – Pole position earned by points standings or practice time. * – Most laps led.)

ARCA Permatex SuperCar Series results
Year	Team	No.	Make	1	2	3	4	5	6	7	8	9	10	11	12	13	14	15	16	17	18	19	APSSC	Pts	Ref
1988	Wangerin Racing	39	Ford	DAY	ATL	TAL; 24	FRS	PCS	ROC	POC	WIN	KIL	ACS	SLM	POC	TAL	DEL	FRS	ISF	DSF	SLM	ATL	N/A	0	
