= Ken Ragan =

American racing driver (born 1950)

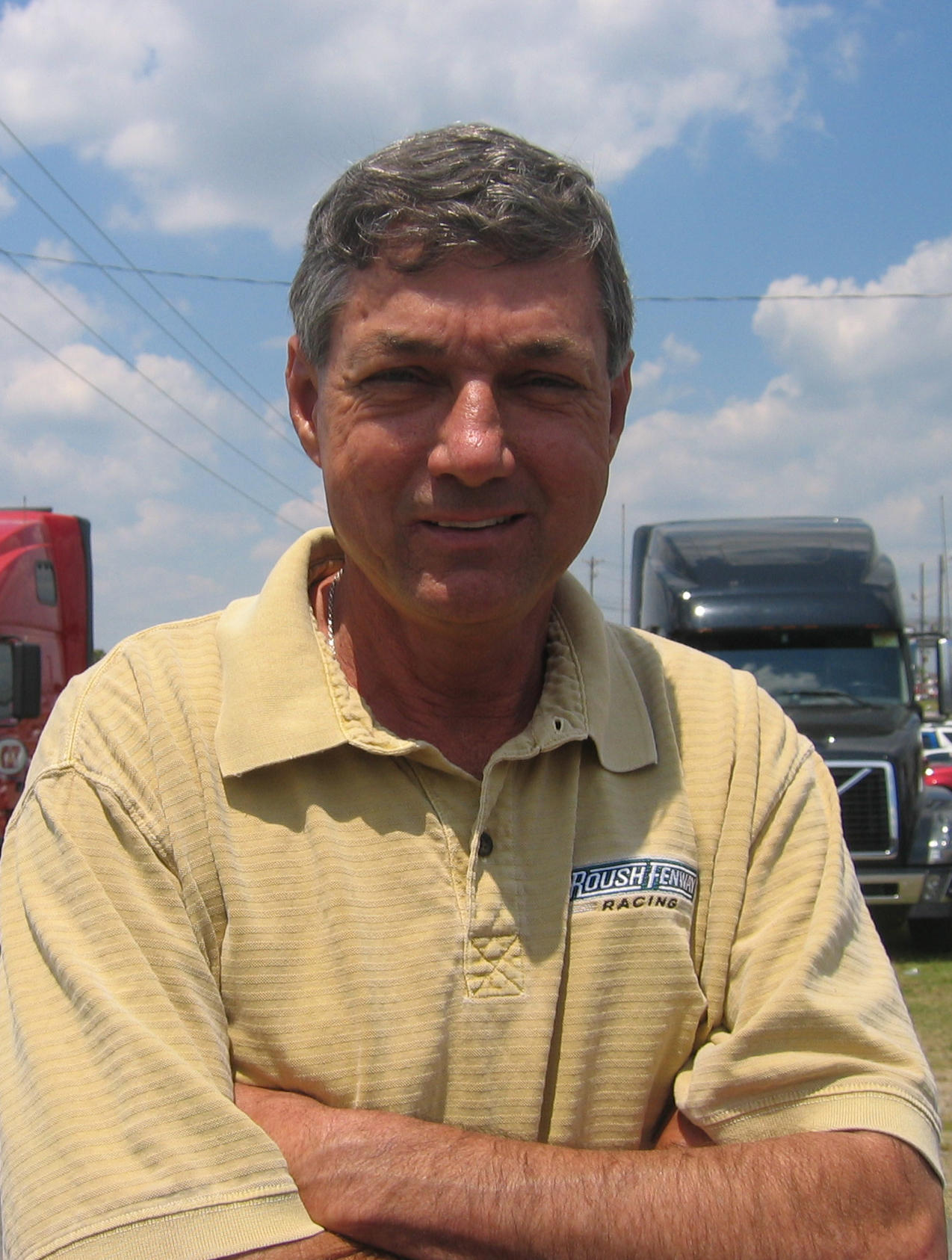
- Ragan in 2008
- Born: September 12, 1950 (age 76); Unadilla, Georgia, U.S.

NASCAR Cup Series career
- 50 races run over 8 years
- Best finish: 35th (1983)
- First race: 1983 Coca-Cola 500 (Atlanta)
- Last race: 1990 Champion Spark Plug 400 (Michigan)
Wins	Top tens	Poles
0	0	0

NASCAR O'Reilly Auto Parts Series career
- 5 races run over 2 years
- Best finish: 58th (1982)
- First race: 1982 TranSouth 200 (Darlington)
- Last race: 1983 Goody's 300 (Daytona)
Wins	Top tens	Poles
0	0	0

Kenneth Ragan (born September 12, 1950) is an American stock car racing driver. Now retired, he formerly competed in the NASCAR Winston Cup Series, and is the father of driver David Ragan.

== Career ==
Ragan made fifty Cup starts from 1982 to 1990, mostly for his brother Marvin, but also drove in the 1985 season for Roger Hamby. Ragan's best finish was an eleventh place that he recorded at Talladega Superspeedway in 1984. He also made five Busch Series starts in 1982 and 1983. Ragan's 1984 No. 77 Cup car is sometimes featured in stills from the 1984 Firecracker 400, as he was the lapped car directly ahead of Richard Petty and Cale Yarborough in their battle for victory. He was the last driver to win at Middle Georgia Raceway.

== Personal life ==
Ragan travels with his son to his races and has served as his manager. He formerly worked at David Ragan Ford, a car dealership owned for several years by his son in Perry, Georgia.

Ragan is a type 1 diabetic, which he was diagnosed with in the 1970s.

== Motorsports career results ==
=== NASCAR ===
(key) (Bold – Pole position awarded by qualifying time. Italics – Pole position earned by points standings or practice time. * – Most laps led.)

==== Winston Cup Series ====
NASCAR Winston Cup Series results
Year	Team	No.	Make	1	2	3	4	5	6	7	8	9	10	11	12	13	14	15	16	17	18	19	20	21	22	23	24	25	26	27	28	29	30	NWCC	Pts	Ref
1983	Branch-Ragan Racing	57	Buick	DAY	RCH	CAR	ATL; 27	DAR	NWS	MAR																								35th	836	
1983	Branch-Ragan Racing	77	Buick								TAL; 12	NSV	DOV	BRI																				35th	836	
1983	Branch-Ragan Racing	97	Buick												CLT; 17	RSD	POC	MCH																35th	836	
1983	Branch-Ragan Racing	77	Chevy																DAY; 12	NSV	POC	TAL; 14	MCH	BRI	DAR; 19	RCH	DOV	MAR	NWS	CLT; 38	CAR	ATL; 17	RSD	35th	836	
1984	Branch-Ragan Racing	77	Chevy	DAY; 14	RCH	CAR	ATL; 21	BRI	NWS	DAR	MAR	TAL	NSV	DOV	CLT; 19	RSD	POC	MCH; 26	DAY; 26	NSV	POC; 35	TAL; 11	MCH	BRI	DAR; 26	RCH	DOV	MAR	CLT; 36	NWS	CAR	ATL; 40	RSD	40th	873	
1985	Hamby Motorsports	17	Chevy	DAY; 21	RCH	CAR	ATL; 33	BRI	DAR; 37	NWS	MAR	TAL; INQ^{†}	DOV	CLT	RSD	POC	MCH	DAY	POC	TAL	MCH; 17	BRI	DAR; 20	RCH	DOV	MAR	NWS			ATL; 34	RSD			47th	356	
1985	DiGard Motorsports	10	Ford																									CLT; 28	CAR					47th	356	
1986	Adcox Racing	77	Chevy	DAY; 21	RCH	CAR	ATL	BRI	DAR	NWS	MAR	TAL; DNQ	DOV																					39th	627	
1986	Morris-Ragan	45	Pontiac											CLT; 41	RSD	POC	MCH																	39th	627	
1986	Branch-Ragan Racing	77	Chevy															DAY; 34	POC	TAL; 18	GLN	MCH; 17	BRI	DAR	RCH	DOV	MAR	NWS						39th	627	
1986	Branch-Ragan Racing	48	Chevy																										CLT; 23	CAR	ATL; 19	RSD		39th	627	
1987	Branch-Ragan Racing	77	Ford	DAY; 17	CAR	RCH	ATL; 26	DAR	NWS	BRI	MAR	TAL; 21	CLT	DOV	POC	RSD	MCH	DAY	POC	TAL	GLN	MCH; 30	BRI	DAR	RCH	DOV	MAR	NWS	CLT; 26	CAR	RSD	ATL; 23		41st	549	
1988	Branch-Ragan Racing	77	Ford	DAY; DNQ	RCH	CAR	ATL; 35	DAR	BRI	NWS	MAR	TAL; 41	CLT	DOV	RSD	POC	MCH	DAY; 30	POC	TAL; 30	GLN	MCH	BRI	DAR; 31	RCH	DOV	MAR	CLT	NWS	CAR	PHO	ATL		47th	314	
1989	Branch-Ragan Racing	77	Ford	DAY	CAR	ATL	RCH	DAR	BRI	NWS	MAR	TAL; DNQ	CLT	DOV	SON	POC	MCH	DAY	POC	TAL	GLN	MCH; 29	BRI	DAR	RCH	DOV	MAR	CLT; 27	NWS	CAR	PHO	ATL; 39		54th	204	
1990	Branch-Ragan Racing	77	Ford	DAY; DNQ	RCH	CAR	ATL; 36	DAR	BRI	NWS	MAR	TAL	CLT; 41	DOV	SON	POC	MCH; DNQ	DAY	POC; 24	TAL; DNQ	GLN	MCH; 37	BRI	DAR	RCH	DOV	MAR	NWS	CLT	CAR	PHO	ATL		55th	238	
1991	Branch-Ragan Racing	77	Ford	DAY	RCH	CAR	ATL	DAR	BRI	NWS	MAR	TAL; DNQ	CLT	DOV	SON	POC	MCH	DAY	POC	TAL	GLN	MCH	BRI	DAR	RCH	DOV	MAR	NWS	CLT	CAR	PHO	ATL		NA	-	
1993	Sadler Brothers Racing	95	Ford	DAY; DNQ	CAR	RCH	ATL	DAR	BRI	NWS	MAR	TAL	SON	CLT	DOV	POC	MCH	DAY	NHA	POC	TAL	GLN	MCH	BRI	DAR	RCH	DOV	MAR	NWS	CLT	CAR	PHO	ATL	NA	-	
^{†} – Qualified but replaced by Bosco Lowe

===== Daytona 500 =====
Year	Team	Manufacturer	Start	Finish
1984	Branch-Ragan Racing	Chevrolet	17	14
1985	Hamby Motorsports	Chevrolet	37	21
1986	Adcox Racing	Chevrolet	38	21
1987	Branch-Ragan Racing	Ford	24	17
1988	Branch-Ragan Racing	Ford	DNQ	
1990	Branch-Ragan Racing	Ford	DNQ	
1993	Sadler Brothers Racing	Ford	DNQ	

==== Late Model Sportsman Series ====
NASCAR Late Model Sportsman Series results
Year	Team	No.	Make	1	2	3	4	5	6	7	8	9	10	11	12	13	14	15	16	17	18	19	20	21	22	23	24	25	26	27	28	29	30	31	32	33	34	35	NLMSC	Pts	Ref
1982	Branch-Ragan Racing	57	Pontiac	DAY	RCH	BRI	MAR	DAR; 22	HCY	SBO	CRW	RCH	LGY	DOV	HCY	CLT; 33	ASH	HCY	SBO	CAR; 15	CRW	SBO	HCY	LGY	IRP	BRI	HCY	RCH	MAR	CLT; 11	HCY	MAR							58th	409	
1983	Branch-Ragan Racing	57	Pontiac	DAY; 26	RCH	CAR	HCY	MAR	NWS	SBO	GPS	LGY	DOV	BRI	CLT	SBO	HCY	ROU	SBO	ROU	CRW	ROU	SBO	HCY	LGY	IRP	GPS	BRI	HCY	DAR	RCH	NWS	SBO	MAR	ROU	CLT	HCY	MAR	133rd	85	

=== ARCA Permatex SuperCar Series ===
(key) (Bold – Pole position awarded by qualifying time. Italics – Pole position earned by points standings or practice time. * – Most laps led.)

ARCA Permatex SuperCar Series results
Year	Team	No.	Make	1	2	3	4	5	6	7	8	9	10	11	12	13	14	15	16	17	18	19	20	APSC	Pts	Ref
1982	Branch-Ragan Racing	57	Pontiac	NSV	DAY	TAL; 28	FRS	CMS	WIN	NSV	TAT	TAL; 10	FRS	BFS	MIL	SND								NA	0	
1983	Branch-Ragan Racing	57	Pontiac	DAY; 8	NSV	TAL	LPR	LPR	ISF	IRP	SSP	FRS	BFS	WIN	LPR	POC	TAL	MCS	FRS	MIL	DSF	ZAN	SND	NA	0	
1984	Branch-Ragan Racing	77	Chevy	DAY	ATL	TAL; 3	CSP	SMS	FRS	MCS	LCS	IRP												NA	0	
1984		9	Pontiac										TAL; 34	FRS	ISF	DSF		MGR; 16						NA	0	
1984		77	Pontiac														TOL; 16							NA	0	
1985		9	Pontiac	ATL; 38																				31st	-	
1985		77	Chevy		**DAY**; 4	ATL; 15																		31st	-	
1985		17	Chevy				TAL; 15*	ATL	SSP	IRP	CSP	FRS	IRP	OEF	ISF	DSF	TOL							31st	-	
1986		17	Pontiac	ATL; 20	DAY	ATL	TAL	SIR	SSP	FRS	KIL	CSP	TAL	BLN	ISF	DSF	TOL	MCS	ATL					107th	-	
1990	Branch-Ragan Racing	74	Ford	DAY; 5	ATL; 4	KIL; 15	TAL; 13	FRS	POC; 9	KIL	TOL	HAG	POC	TAL	MCH	ISF	TOL	DSF	WIN	DEL	ATL			36th	-	
1991	Kincaid Racing	47	Chevy	DAY; 8																				16th	1470	
1991	Sadler Brothers Racing	95	Chevy		ATL; 2		TAL; 3																	16th	1470	
1991	Sadler Brothers Racing	5	Buick			KIL; 14																		16th	1470	
1991	Sadler Brothers Racing	5	Pontiac					TOL; 21	FRS; 10	POC	MCH	KIL	FRS	DEL	POC	TAL	HPT	MCH	ISF	TOL	DSF	TWS		16th	1470	
1991	Craig Rubright	15	Olds																				ATL; 41	16th	1470	
