= 1987 Winston 500 =

Ninth race of the 1987 NASCAR Winston Cup Series

Race details
- Race 9 of 29 in the 1987 NASCAR Winston Cup Series
- The 1987 Winston 500 program cover, featuring Bobby Allison.
- Date: May 3, 1987
- Official name: 18th Annual Winston 500
- Location: Lincoln, Alabama, Alabama International Motor Speedway
- Course: Permanent racing facility
- Course length: 2.66 miles (4.28 km)
- Distance: 178 laps, 473.48 mi (761.992 km)
- Scheduled distance: 188 laps, 500.08 mi (804.801 km)
- Average speed: 154.228 miles per hour (248.206 km/h)
- Attendance: 135,000

Pole position
Driver	Bill Elliott	Melling Racing
- Time: 44.998

Most laps led
Driver	Davey Allison	Ranier-Lundy Racing
- Laps: 101

Winner
No. 28	Davey Allison	Ranier-Lundy Racing

Television in the United States
- Network: ESPN
- Announcers: Bob Jenkins, Larry Nuber

Radio in the United States
- Radio: Motor Racing Network

The 1987 Winston 500 was the ninth stock car race of the 1987 NASCAR Winston Cup Series season and the 18th iteration of the event. The race was held on Sunday, May 3, 1987, before an audience of 135,000 in Lincoln, Alabama at Alabama International Motor Speedway, a 2.66-mile (4.28-kilometre) permanent triangle-shaped superspeedway. The race was shortened from its scheduled 188 laps to 178 due to impending darkness that was caused by a lengthy red flag for debris cleanup and catch fence repairs for an earlier accident.

By race's end, Ranier-Lundy Racing's Davey Allison had managed to dominate a majority of the race, leading 101 laps when the race was called to take his first career NASCAR Winston Cup Series victory and his first victory of the season. To fill out the top three, Junior Johnson & Associates' Terry Labonte and Wood Brothers Racing's Kyle Petty finished second and third, respectively.

The race is considered to be one of the most influential races in terms of the advancement of auto racing safety. On the 21st lap of the race, Stavola Brothers Racing's Bobby Allison lost his engine, with pieces of his engine cutting his right rear tire at speeds of around 210 miles per hour (340 km/h). The car turned backwards and went airborne, hitting the wall and tearing down a wide stretch of protective fencing to protect fans from accidents. After the car hit the fence, the car was described to have spun "round-and-round like an insane top" per The Atlanta Constitution writer Bill Robinson, collecting other cars in the accident and the accident itself injuring four spectators; none of them seriously.

The nature of the crash became a source of controversy for NASCAR. In response, NASCAR implemented the mandatory restrictor plate by the start of the 1988 season, which restricted air intake to the engine, made cars considerably slower, and unintentionally ushered in the era of pack racing.

== Background ==
The layout of Alabama International Motor Speedway, the venue where the race was held.

Talladega Superspeedway, originally known as Alabama International Motor Superspeedway (AIMS), is a motorsports complex located north of Talladega, Alabama. It is located on the former Anniston Air Force Base in the small city of Lincoln. The track is a tri-oval and was constructed in the 1960s by the International Speedway Corporation, a business controlled by the France family. Talladega is most known for its steep banking and the unique location of the start/finish line that's located just past the exit to pit road. The track currently hosts the NASCAR series such as the NASCAR Cup Series, Xfinity Series and the Camping World Truck Series. Talladega is the longest NASCAR oval, a 2.66-mile-long (4.28 km) tri-oval like the Daytona International Speedway, which also is a 2.5-mile-long (4.0 km) tri-oval.

=== Entry list ===
- (R) denotes rookie driver.

#	Driver	Team	Make	Sponsor
1	Ron Bouchard	Ellington Racing	Buick	Bull's-Eye Barbecue Sauce
3	Dale Earnhardt	Richard Childress Racing	Chevrolet	Wrangler
4	Rick Wilson	Morgan–McClure Motorsports	Oldsmobile	Kodak
5	Geoff Bodine	Hendrick Motorsports	Chevrolet	Levi Garrett
6	Rick Knoop	U.S. Racing	Chevrolet	U.S. Racing
7	Alan Kulwicki	AK Racing	Ford	Zerex
8	Bobby Hillin Jr.	Stavola Brothers Racing	Buick	Miller American
9	Bill Elliott	Melling Racing	Ford	Coors
11	Terry Labonte	Junior Johnson & Associates	Chevrolet	Budweiser
12	Slick Johnson	Hamby Racing	Chevrolet	Hamby Racing
15	Ricky Rudd	Bud Moore Engineering	Ford	Motorcraft Quality Parts
17	Darrell Waltrip	Hendrick Motorsports	Chevrolet	Tide
18	Dale Jarrett (R)	Freedlander Motorsports	Chevrolet	Freedlander Financial
21	Kyle Petty	Wood Brothers Racing	Ford	Citgo
22	Bobby Allison	Stavola Brothers Racing	Buick	Miller American
26	Morgan Shepherd	King Racing	Buick	Quaker State
27	Rusty Wallace	Blue Max Racing	Pontiac	Kodiak
28	Davey Allison (R)	Ranier-Lundy Racing	Ford	Texaco, Havoline
29	Cale Yarborough	Cale Yarborough Motorsports	Oldsmobile	Hardee's
30	Michael Waltrip	Bahari Racing	Chevrolet	Bahari Racing
33	Harry Gant	Mach 1 Racing	Chevrolet	Skoal Bandit
35	Benny Parsons	Hendrick Motorsports	Chevrolet	Folgers
39	Blackie Wangerin	Wangerin Racing	Ford	Wangerin Racing
43	Richard Petty	Petty Enterprises	Pontiac	STP
44	Sterling Marlin	Hagan Racing	Oldsmobile	Piedmont Airlines
50	Greg Sacks	Dingman Brothers Racing	Pontiac	Valvoline
52	Jimmy Means	Jimmy Means Racing	Pontiac	In-Fisherman
55	Phil Parsons	Jackson Bros. Motorsports	Oldsmobile	Copenhagen
62	Steve Christman (R)	Winkle Motorsports	Pontiac	AC Spark Plug
64	Connie Saylor	Langley Racing	Ford	Sunny King Ford
67	Eddie Bierschwale	Arrington Racing	Ford	Pannill Sweatshirts
71	Dave Marcis	Marcis Auto Racing	Chevrolet	Lifebuoy
73	Phil Barkdoll	Barkdoll Racing	Chevrolet	Helen Rae Special
75	Neil Bonnett	RahMoc Enterprises	Pontiac	Valvoline
77	Ken Ragan	Ragan Racing	Ford	Southlake Ford
81	Chet Fillip	Fillip Racing	Ford	Warr Valves
82	Mark Stahl	Stahl Racing	Ford	Auto Bell Car Wash
83	Lake Speed	Speed Racing	Oldsmobile	Wynn's, Kmart
86	Ronnie Sanders	Moss Racing	Ford	Moss Racing
88	Buddy Baker	Baker–Schiff Racing	Oldsmobile	Crisco
90	Ken Schrader	Donlavey Racing	Ford	Red Baron Frozen Pizza
98	Ed Pimm	Curb Racing	Buick	CP-1 Oil Booster
99	Joe Ruttman	Ball Motorsports	Chevrolet	Ball Motorsports

== Qualifying ==
Qualifying was split into two rounds. The first round was held on Thursday, April 30, at 2:00 PM EST. Each driver had one lap to set a time. During the first round, the top 20 drivers in the round were guaranteed a starting spot in the race. If a driver was not able to guarantee a spot in the first round, they had the option to scrub their time from the first round and try and run a faster lap time in a second round qualifying run, held on Friday, May 1, at 2:00 PM EST. As with the first round, each driver had one lap to set a time. For this specific race, positions 21-40 were decided on time, and depending on who needed it, a select amount of positions were given to cars who had not otherwise qualified but were high enough in owner's points; up to two were given.

Bill Elliott, driving for Melling Racing, managed to win the pole, setting a time of 44.998 and an average speed of 212.809 miles per hour (342.483 km/h) in the first round. The lap set a new all-time record for the fastest recorded qualifying lap based on average speed; the record still stands as of March 2026.

Two drivers failed to qualify. One of the drivers who failed to qualify, Blackie Wangerin, crashed during his second-round qualifying run, crashing his only car in the process. The other driver, Ronnie Sanders, elected to stand on his time; the time was the slowest out of all drivers who ran a lap in both sessions and he did not have enough owner's points for a provisional.

=== Full qualifying results ===
Pos.	#	Driver	Team	Make	Time	Speed
1	9	Bill Elliott	Melling Racing	Ford	44.998	212.809
2	22	Bobby Allison	Stavola Brothers Racing	Buick	45.213	211.797
3	28	Davey Allison (R)	Ranier-Lundy Racing	Ford	45.468	210.610
4	17	Darrell Waltrip	Hendrick Motorsports	Chevrolet	45.498	210.471
5	3	Dale Earnhardt	Richard Childress Racing	Chevrolet	45.522	210.360
6	21	Kyle Petty	Wood Brothers Racing	Ford	45.525	210.346
7	44	Sterling Marlin	Hagan Racing	Oldsmobile	45.558	210.194
8	11	Terry Labonte	Junior Johnson & Associates	Chevrolet	45.578	210.101
9	55	Phil Parsons	Jackson Bros. Motorsports	Oldsmobile	45.608	209.963
10	83	Lake Speed	Speed Racing	Oldsmobile	45.608	209.963
11	5	Geoff Bodine	Hendrick Motorsports	Chevrolet	45.663	209.710
12	88	Buddy Baker	Baker–Schiff Racing	Oldsmobile	45.665	209.701
13	1	Ron Bouchard	Ellington Racing	Buick	45.838	208.910
14	27	Rusty Wallace	Blue Max Racing	Pontiac	45.983	208.251
15	90	Ken Schrader	Donlavey Racing	Ford	46.003	208.160
16	8	Bobby Hillin Jr.	Stavola Brothers Racing	Buick	46.007	208.142
17	15	Ricky Rudd	Bud Moore Engineering	Ford	46.008	208.138
18	29	Cale Yarborough	Cale Yarborough Motorsports	Oldsmobile	46.018	208.092
19	26	Morgan Shepherd	King Racing	Buick	46.076	207.831
20	35	Benny Parsons	Hendrick Motorsports	Chevrolet	46.114	207.659
Failed to lock in Round 1
21	75	Neil Bonnett	RahMoc Enterprises	Pontiac	46.171	207.403
22	50	Greg Sacks	Dingman Brothers Racing	Pontiac	46.206	207.246
23	99	Joe Ruttman	Ball Motorsports	Chevrolet	46.280	206.914
24	30	Michael Waltrip	Bahari Racing	Chevrolet	46.300	206.825
25	43	Richard Petty	Petty Enterprises	Pontiac	46.323	206.722
26	33	Harry Gant	Mach 1 Racing	Chevrolet	46.353	206.589
27	4	Rick Wilson	Morgan–McClure Motorsports	Oldsmobile	46.446	206.175
28	7	Alan Kulwicki	AK Racing	Ford	46.489	205.984
29	77	Ken Ragan	Ragan Racing	Ford	46.527	205.816
30	98	Ed Pimm	Curb Racing	Buick	46.635	205.339
31	81	Chet Fillip	Fillip Racing	Ford	46.645	205.295
32	64	Connie Saylor	Langley Racing	Ford	46.823	204.515
33	82	Mark Stahl	Stahl Racing	Ford	46.919	204.096
34	67	Eddie Bierschwale	Arrington Racing	Ford	46.939	204.009
35	71	Dave Marcis	Marcis Auto Racing	Chevrolet	47.224	202.778
36	12	Slick Johnson	Hamby Racing	Chevrolet	47.346	202.256
37	73	Phil Barkdoll	Barkdoll Racing	Chevrolet	47.480	201.685
38	18	Dale Jarrett (R)	Freedlander Motorsports	Chevrolet	47.542	201.422
39	6	Rick Knoop	U.S. Racing	Chevrolet	47.561	201.341
40	62	Steve Christman (R)	Winkle Motorsports	Pontiac	48.276	198.359
Provisional
41	52	Jimmy Means	Jimmy Means Racing	Pontiac	-	-
Failed to qualify
42	86	Ronnie Sanders	Moss Racing	Ford	49.142	194.864
43	39	Blackie Wangerin	Wangerin Racing	Ford	-	-
Official first round qualifying results
Official starting lineup

== Race results ==
Fin	St	#	Driver	Team	Make	Laps	Led	Status	Pts	Winnings
1	3	28	Davey Allison (R)	Ranier-Lundy Racing	Ford	178	101	running	185	$71,250
2	8	11	Terry Labonte	Junior Johnson & Associates	Chevrolet	178	7	running	175	$47,060
3	6	21	Kyle Petty	Wood Brothers Racing	Ford	178	0	running	165	$30,915
4	5	3	Dale Earnhardt	Richard Childress Racing	Chevrolet	178	10	running	165	$31,350
5	16	8	Bobby Hillin Jr.	Stavola Brothers Racing	Buick	178	0	running	155	$25,055
6	14	27	Rusty Wallace	Blue Max Racing	Pontiac	178	1	running	155	$21,325
7	21	75	Neil Bonnett	RahMoc Enterprises	Pontiac	178	2	running	151	$16,520
8	15	90	Ken Schrader	Donlavey Racing	Ford	178	4	running	147	$17,050
9	10	83	Lake Speed	Speed Racing	Oldsmobile	177	0	running	138	$9,575
10	19	26	Morgan Shepherd	King Racing	Buick	177	0	running	134	$13,965
11	4	17	Darrell Waltrip	Hendrick Motorsports	Chevrolet	177	0	running	130	$7,565
12	20	35	Benny Parsons	Hendrick Motorsports	Chevrolet	177	2	running	132	$16,315
13	35	71	Dave Marcis	Marcis Auto Racing	Chevrolet	177	0	running	124	$11,570
14	7	44	Sterling Marlin	Hagan Racing	Oldsmobile	176	0	running	121	$10,050
15	36	12	Slick Johnson	Hamby Racing	Chevrolet	175	2	running	123	$9,940
16	25	43	Richard Petty	Petty Enterprises	Pontiac	173	0	running	115	$9,030
17	33	82	Mark Stahl	Stahl Racing	Ford	173	0	running	112	$5,395
18	34	67	Eddie Bierschwale	Arrington Racing	Ford	172	0	running	109	$7,900
19	40	62	Steve Christman (R)	Winkle Motorsports	Pontiac	167	0	running	106	$4,495
20	27	4	Rick Wilson	Morgan–McClure Motorsports	Oldsmobile	165	0	overheating	103	$4,845
21	29	77	Ken Ragan	Ragan Racing	Ford	158	0	crash	100	$4,035
22	1	9	Bill Elliott	Melling Racing	Ford	150	48	engine	102	$16,685
23	32	64	Connie Saylor	Langley Racing	Ford	134	0	engine	94	$6,840
24	39	6	Rick Knoop	U.S. Racing	Chevrolet	130	0	wheel bearing	91	$6,470
25	24	30	Michael Waltrip	Bahari Racing	Chevrolet	125	0	clutch	88	$6,460
26	22	50	Greg Sacks	Dingman Brothers Racing	Pontiac	109	0	crash	0	$3,545
27	30	98	Ed Pimm	Curb Racing	Buick	103	1	engine	87	$3,495
28	38	18	Dale Jarrett (R)	Freedlander Motorsports	Chevrolet	96	0	engine	79	$6,200
29	26	33	Harry Gant	Mach 1 Racing	Chevrolet	90	0	crash	76	$6,130
30	17	15	Ricky Rudd	Bud Moore Engineering	Ford	89	0	crash	73	$11,745
31	9	55	Phil Parsons	Jackson Bros. Motorsports	Oldsmobile	84	0	running	70	$3,250
32	12	88	Buddy Baker	Baker–Schiff Racing	Oldsmobile	69	0	engine	67	$3,225
33	41	52	Jimmy Means	Jimmy Means Racing	Pontiac	61	0	wheel bearing	64	$5,200
34	28	7	Alan Kulwicki	AK Racing	Ford	30	0	engine	61	$6,175
35	37	73	Phil Barkdoll	Barkdoll Racing	Chevrolet	27	0	transmission	58	3,150
36	23	99	Joe Ruttman	Ball Motorsports	Chevrolet	27	0	transmission	0	$3,125
37	18	29	Cale Yarborough	Cale Yarborough Motorsports	Oldsmobile	22	0	crash	52	$3,100
38	13	1	Ron Bouchard	Ellington Racing	Buick	22	0	crash	49	$3,075
39	2	22	Bobby Allison	Stavola Brothers Racing	Buick	21	0	crash	46	$11,275
40	11	5	Geoff Bodine	Hendrick Motorsports	Chevrolet	11	0	engine	43	$10,000
41	31	81	Chet Fillip	Fillip Racing	Ford	3	0	engine	40	$3,000
Failed to qualify
42		86	Ronnie Sanders	Moss Racing	Ford					
43		39	Blackie Wangerin	Wangerin Racing	Ford					
Official race results

== Standings after the race ==
Drivers' Championship standings

	Pos	Driver	Points
	1	Dale Earnhardt	1,555
	2	Bill Elliott	1,335 (-220)
	3	Neil Bonnett	1,289 (-266)
1	4	Terry Labonte	1,253 (–302)
1	5	Richard Petty	1,220 (–335)
1	6	Rusty Wallace	1,216 (–339)
1	7	Kyle Petty	1,194 (–361)
1	8	Ken Schrader	1,175 (–380)
4	9	Ricky Rudd	1,158 (–397)
	10	Darrell Waltrip	1,152 (–403)
Official driver's standings

- Note: Only the first 10 positions are included for the driver standings.

Previous race: 1987 Sovran Bank 500	NASCAR Winston Cup Series; 1987 season	Next race: 1987 Coca-Cola 600
