= 1990 Daytona 500 =

First race of the 1990 NASCAR Winston Cup Series

Race details
- Race 1 of 29 in the 1990 NASCAR Winston Cup Series
- The 1990 Daytona 500 program cover, featuring Darrell Waltrip.
- Date: February 18, 1990
- Official name: 32nd Annual Daytona 500
- Location: Daytona Beach, Florida, Daytona International Speedway
- Course: Permanent racing facility
- Course length: 2.5 miles (4.0 km)
- Distance: 200 laps, 500 mi (804.672 km)
- Average speed: 165.761 miles per hour (266.766 km/h)
- Attendance: 150,000

Pole position
Driver	Ken Schrader	Hendrick Motorsports
- Time: 45.798

Most laps led
Driver	Dale Earnhardt	Richard Childress Racing
- Laps: 155

Winner
No. 10	Derrike Cope	Whitcomb Racing

Television in the United States
- Network: CBS
- Announcers: Ken Squier, Chris Economaki, Ned Jarrett

Radio in the United States
- Radio: Motor Racing Network

The 1990 Daytona 500 was the first stock car race of the 1990 NASCAR Winston Cup Series season and the 32nd iteration of the event. The race was held on Sunday, February 18, 1990, in Daytona Beach, Florida at Daytona International Speedway, a 2.5 miles (4.0 km) permanent triangular-shaped superspeedway. The race took the scheduled 200 laps to complete. On the final lap of the race, Whitcomb Racing driver Derrike Cope would manage to take advantage of a misfortunate Dale Earnhardt, when Earnhardt suffered a flat tire on the final turn of the race, allowing Cope to take the lead. The victory was Cope's first career NASCAR Winston Cup Series victory and his first victory of the season. To fill out the top three, Precision Products Racing driver Terry Labonte and Melling Racing driver Bill Elliott would finish second and third, respectively.

== Background ==
The layout of Daytona International Speedway, the venue where the race was held.

Daytona International Speedway is one of three superspeedways to hold NASCAR races, the other two being Indianapolis Motor Speedway and Talladega Superspeedway. The standard track at Daytona International Speedway is a four-turn superspeedway that is 2.5 miles (4.0 km) long. The track's turns are banked at 31 degrees, while the front stretch, the location of the finish line, is banked at 18 degrees.

=== Entry list ===
- (R) denotes rookie driver.

#	Driver	Team	Make
0	Delma Cowart	H. L. Waters Racing	Ford
1	Terry Labonte	Precision Products Racing	Oldsmobile
01	Mickey Gibbs	Gibbs Racing	Ford
2	Eddie Bierschwale	U.S. Racing	Pontiac
02	Rich Bickle	Bickle Racing	Oldsmobile
3	Dale Earnhardt	Richard Childress Racing	Chevrolet
4	Phil Parsons	Morgan–McClure Motorsports	Oldsmobile
5	Ricky Rudd	Hendrick Motorsports	Chevrolet
6	Mark Martin	Roush Racing	Ford
7	Alan Kulwicki	AK Racing	Ford
8	Bobby Hillin Jr.	Stavola Brothers Racing	Buick
9	Bill Elliott	Melling Racing	Ford
10	Derrike Cope	Whitcomb Racing	Chevrolet
11	Geoff Bodine	Junior Johnson & Associates	Ford
12	Mike Alexander	Bobby Allison Motorsports	Buick
13	Mike Potter	Mansion Motorsports	Chevrolet
14	A. J. Foyt	A. J. Foyt Racing	Oldsmobile
15	Morgan Shepherd	Bud Moore Engineering	Ford
16	Larry Pearson	Pearson Racing	Buick
17	Darrell Waltrip	Hendrick Motorsports	Chevrolet
19	Chad Little	Little Racing	Ford
20	Rob Moroso (R)	Moroso Racing	Oldsmobile
21	Neil Bonnett	Wood Brothers Racing	Ford
25	Ken Schrader	Hendrick Motorsports	Chevrolet
26	Brett Bodine	King Racing	Buick
27	Rusty Wallace	Blue Max Racing	Pontiac
28	Davey Allison	Robert Yates Racing	Ford
29	Joe Booher	Booher Racing	Pontiac
30	Michael Waltrip	Bahari Racing	Pontiac
32	Joe Ruttman	CalCar Motorsports	Pontiac
33	Harry Gant	Leo Jackson Motorsports	Oldsmobile
34	Charlie Glotzbach	AAG Racing	Pontiac
35	Bill Venturini	Venturini Motorsports	Chevrolet
37	Dennis Langston	Langston Motorsports	Ford
39	Blackie Wangerin	Wangerin Racing	Ford
42	Kyle Petty	SABCO Racing	Pontiac
43	Richard Petty	Petty Enterprises	Pontiac
44	Jim Sauter	Group 44	Pontiac
47	Jack Pennington (R)	Close Racing	Oldsmobile
48	Trevor Boys	Lusty Racing	Buick
52	Jimmy Means	Jimmy Means Racing	Pontiac
53	Jerry O'Neil (R)	Aroneck Racing	Oldsmobile
57	Jimmy Spencer	Osterlund Racing	Pontiac
59	Mark Gibson	CoHo Racing	Pontiac
66	Dick Trickle	Cale Yarborough Motorsports	Pontiac
68	Hut Stricklin	TriStar Motorsports	Chevrolet
70	J. D. McDuffie	McDuffie Racing	Pontiac
71	Dave Marcis	Marcis Auto Racing	Chevrolet
72	Stan Barrett	Barkdoll Racing	Oldsmobile
73	Phil Barkdoll	Barkdoll Racing	Oldsmobile
75	Rick Wilson	RahMoc Enterprises	Oldsmobile
77	Ken Ragan	Ragan Racing	Ford
80	Jimmy Horton	S&H Racing	Ford
82	Mark Stahl	Stahl Racing	Ford
83	Lake Speed	Speed Racing	Oldsmobile
85	Bobby Gerhart	Bobby Gerhart Racing	Chevrolet
89	Rodney Combs	Mueller Brothers Racing	Pontiac
90	Ernie Irvan	Donlavey Racing	Ford
94	Sterling Marlin	Hagan Racing	Oldsmobile
96	Philip Duffie	Duffie Racing	Buick
98	Butch Miller	Travis Carter Enterprises	Chevrolet

== Qualifying ==
Qualifying was set by the 1990 Twin 125 Qualifiers. The top two positions were set by qualifying speeds held for the Twin 125 Qualifiers held on Saturday, February 10, with the top two qualifiers in the session earning the top two positions for the Daytona 500. The rest of the starting was set in the Twin 125 Qualifiers, held on Thursday, February 15 during two races. The top 14 finishers in the first race, excluding the pole position winner, would set the inside row from rows two to 15, and the top 14 finishers in the second race, excluding the outside pole position winner, would set the outside row from rows two to 15. The remaining non-qualifiers would set positions 31-40 based on qualifying speeds from the first qualifying session held on Saturday. If needed, up to two extra provisionals were given to teams high enough in the previous season's owner's standings that did not qualify for the race by either qualifying speed or from the Twin 125 Qualifiers.

Ken Schrader, driving for Hendrick Motorsports, would win the pole, setting a time of 45.798 and an average speed of 196.515 miles per hour (316.260 km/h) in Saturday's session.

19 drivers would fail to qualify.

=== Full qualifying results ===
Pos.	#	Driver	Team	Make	Reason
1	25	Ken Schrader	Hendrick Motorsports	Chevrolet	Qualified on pole
2	3	Dale Earnhardt	Richard Childress Racing	Chevrolet	Qualified on outside pole
3	11	Geoff Bodine	Junior Johnson & Associates	Ford	First in Twin 125 #1
4	9	Bill Elliott	Melling Racing	Ford	Second in Twin 125 #2
5	33	Harry Gant	Leo Jackson Motorsports	Oldsmobile	Second in Twin 125 #1
6	57	Jimmy Spencer	Osterlund Racing	Pontiac	Third in Twin 125 #2
7	6	Mark Martin	Roush Racing	Ford	Third in Twin 125 #1
8	4	Phil Parsons	Morgan–McClure Motorsports	Oldsmobile	Fourth in Twin 125 #2
9	17	Darrell Waltrip	Hendrick Motorsports	Chevrolet	Fourth in Twin 125 #1
10	8	Bobby Hillin Jr.	Stavola Brothers Racing	Buick	Fifth in Twin 125 #2
11	43	Richard Petty	Petty Enterprises	Pontiac	Fifth in Twin 125 #1
12	10	Derrike Cope	Whitcomb Racing	Chevrolet	Sixth in Twin 125 #2
13	14	A. J. Foyt	A. J. Foyt Racing	Oldsmobile	Sixth in Twin 125 #1
14	83	Lake Speed	Speed Racing	Oldsmobile	Seventh in Twin 125 #2
15	12	Mike Alexander	Bobby Allison Motorsports	Buick	Eighth in Twin 125 #1
16	28	Davey Allison	Robert Yates Racing	Ford	Eighth in Twin 125 #2
17	98	Butch Miller	Travis Carter Enterprises	Chevrolet	Ninth in Twin 125 #1
18	90	Ernie Irvan	Donlavey Racing	Ford	Ninth in Twin 125 #2
19	5	Ricky Rudd	Hendrick Motorsports	Chevrolet	Tenth in Twin 125 #1
20	1	Terry Labonte	Precision Products Racing	Oldsmobile	Tenth in Twin 125 #2
21	94	Sterling Marlin	Hagan Racing	Oldsmobile	11th in Twin 125 #1
22	42	Kyle Petty	SABCO Racing	Pontiac	11th in Twin 125 #2
23	47	Jack Pennington (R)	Close Racing	Oldsmobile	12th in Twin 125 #1
24	30	Michael Waltrip	Bahari Racing	Pontiac	12th in Twin 125 #2
25	7	Alan Kulwicki	AK Racing	Ford	13th in Twin 125 #1
26	16	Larry Pearson	Pearson Racing	Buick	13th in Twin 125 #2
27	32	Joe Ruttman	CalCar Motorsports	Pontiac	14th in Twin 125 #1
28	75	Rick Wilson	RahMoc Enterprises	Oldsmobile	14th in Twin 125 #2
29	02	Rich Bickle	Bickle Racing	Oldsmobile	15th in Twin 125 #1
30	15	Morgan Shepherd	Bud Moore Engineering	Ford	15th in Twin 125 #2
31	21	Neil Bonnett	Wood Brothers Racing	Ford	Speed provisional (194.523)
32	66	Dick Trickle	Cale Yarborough Motorsports	Pontiac	Speed provisional (193.536)
33	26	Brett Bodine	King Racing	Buick	Speed provisional (193.473)
34	68	Hut Stricklin	TriStar Motorsports	Chevrolet	Speed provisional (193.175)
35	73	Phil Barkdoll	Barkdoll Racing	Oldsmobile	Speed provisional (192.761)
36	20	Rob Moroso (R)	Moroso Racing	Oldsmobile	Speed provisional (192.394)
37	52	Jimmy Means	Jimmy Means Racing	Pontiac	Speed provisional (192.217)
38	27	Rusty Wallace	Blue Max Racing	Pontiac	Speed provisional (190.267)
39	53	Jerry O'Neil (R)	Aroneck Racing	Oldsmobile	Speed provisional (189.601)
40	80	Jimmy Horton	S&H Racing	Ford	Speed provisional (189.601)
41	2	Eddie Bierschwale	U.S. Racing	Oldsmobile	Owner's points provisional
42	71	Dave Marcis	Marcis Auto Racing	Chevrolet	Owner's points provisional
Failed to qualify
43	72	Stan Barrett	Barkdoll Racing	Oldsmobile	16th in Twin 125 #1
44	35	Bill Venturini	Venturini Motorsports	Chevrolet	17th in Twin 125 #2
45	44	Jim Sauter	Group 44	Pontiac	17th in Twin 125 #1
46	01	Mickey Gibbs	Gibbs Racing	Ford	19th in Twin 125 #2
47	19	Chad Little	Little Racing	Ford	22nd in Twin 125 #1
48	48	Trevor Boys	Lusty Racing	Buick	21st in Twin 125 #2
49	85	Bobby Gerhart	Bobby Gerhart Racing	Chevrolet	23rd in Twin 125 #1
50	37	Dennis Langston	Langston Motorsports	Ford	23rd in Twin 125 #2
51	13	Mike Potter	Mansion Motorsports	Chevrolet	24th in Twin 125 #1
52	0	Delma Cowart	H. L. Waters Racing	Ford	24th in Twin 125 #2
53	96	Philip Duffie	Duffie Racing	Buick	25th in Twin 125 #1
54	70	J. D. McDuffie	McDuffie Racing	Pontiac	25th in Twin 125 #2
55	77	Ken Ragan	Ragan Racing	Ford	26th in Twin 125 #1
56	82	Mark Stahl	Stahl Racing	Ford	26th in Twin 125 #2
57	59	Mark Gibson	CoHo Racing	Pontiac	30th in Twin 125 #1
58	34	Charlie Glotzbach	AAG Racing	Pontiac	27th in Twin 125 #2
59	39	Blackie Wangerin	Wangerin Racing	Ford	28th in Twin 125 #2
60	89	Rodney Combs	Mueller Brothers Racing	Pontiac	30th in Twin 125 #2
61	29	Joe Booher	Booher Racing	Pontiac	31st in Twin 125 #2
Official Twin 125 Qualifiers results
Official starting lineup

== Race review ==
On the Busch Pole for the third year in a row, Ken Schrader quickly passed several cars at the start after beginning the race in his backup car due to a crash at the end of his Twin 125 qualifier. By the first caution flag, Schrader had driven up to second place. Geoff Bodine led the first lap of the race and the season. Two cars used to create film footage for the upcoming movie Days of Thunder, driven by Bobby Hamilton and Tommy Ellis, started the race in the last row, completing 100 miles before parking. Those cars were not listed in the official race results.

On Lap 27, Richard Petty (who started a promising 11th) spun ahead of Phil Parsons while running 13th. The spin left him with all four tires flat, meaning The King would need a wrecker to take him to the pits for new tires, and he would finish well down the order in 34th. During the yellow, Davey Allison (running 6th) pitted with the leaders and hit the pit wall. This was unnoticed by the television broadcast for several minutes; no injuries were reported but Mike Joy confirmed left front toe damage.

On Lap 43, an accident occurred between the tri-oval and Turn 1 involving Mike Alexander, Alan Kulwicki (who would continue), Phil Parsons, and 1989 NASCAR Busch Series champion and Winston Cup rookie Rob Moroso. Moroso said he touched Phil Parsons' left rear with his own right front after Parsons came down on him, and Parsons explained that he was attempting a pass on A. J. Foyt. After 58 laps, Schrader's run to the front was halted by an engine failure. Shortly after halfway, 1972 winner A. J. Foyt quit after experiencing a bizarre problem: In a mid-race interview with CBS's David Hobbs, Foyt claimed he had become intoxicated by fumes produced by his new racing helmet.

Dale Earnhardt dominated the race. He led 155 of the 200 laps, relinquishing the lead briefly to Bill Elliott, Mark Martin, Derrike Cope, Davey Allison, Geoff Bodine, Terry Labonte, and Bobby Hillin Jr. Daytona 500 rookies Jimmy Spencer and Jack Pennington led yellow flag laps early in the race.

Dale Earnhardt had the race in his grasp with a lead of more than 40 seconds with ten laps to go. On lap 193, Rick Wilson's car was experiencing engine trouble, and was reported to be leaking oil on the track. Geoff Bodine's car spun between turns 1 and 2, possibly due to the oil, which brought out the third and final caution of the day. Most of the leaders - including Earnhardt - ducked into the pits for tires and fuel. Earnhardt took on four fresh tires, as did Terry Labonte, Ricky Rudd and others. Geoff Bodine was able to change his flat-spotted tires and get back in the race, but not before he fell a lap down. Derrike Cope and Bobby Hillin Jr., however, stayed out during the caution, and cycled up to the front of the field. Cope's crew chief Buddy Parrott made the call to not pit and instead stay out on old tires, gambling on track position.

Seven cars were on the lead lap for the final restart. The top five were Derrike Cope, Bobby Hillin Jr., Dale Earnhardt, Terry Labonte, and Bill Elliott. As the cars were lining up for the restart, Earnhardt complained that Hillin bumped his left-rear fender. The green came back out with five laps to go. Earnhardt, with drafting help from Geoff Bodine, quickly dispatched of both Hillin and Cope simultaneously going into turn three. Earnhardt pulled out to a slight lead, with Cope (on old tires) tucking into second. Labonte passed Hillin for third.

Rick Wilson's sputtering engine finally let go, and a piece of the metal bell housing broke off and tumbled to a stop on the backstretch unnoticed. The white flag came out as the top four cars (Earnhardt, Cope, Labonte, Elliott) had broken away from the main draft. Going down the backstretch, with less than half a lap to go, Earnhardt ran over the bell housing debris and shredded the right rear tire. He held the wheel straight, let off the throttle and his car climbed up the banking of turn three. The pieces of the bell housing flew through the air, and ended up imbedded in Ricky Rudd's radiator. Spanaway, Washington's Derrike Cope dove under Earnhardt to shockingly take the lead in turn three. With only one turn remaining, Cope held off a last second challenge by Labonte and won his first ever Winston Cup victory. His previous best career finish was a 6th place at Charlotte in 1989. Earnhardt would manage to limp around to the finish line, and placed 5th. His crew later took the shredded tire and hung it on the wall of the race shop using the loss as motivation to win the 1990 Winston Cup championship. Meanwhile, Cope would become an overnight sensation appearing on The Late Show a week or so later to talk about his big win. Although it is considered one of the biggest upsets in NASCAR history, the ratings did not quite show it, as it drew a 7.3, the lowest in Daytona 500 history.

== Race results ==
Fin	St	#	Driver	Team	Make	Laps	Led	Status	Pts	Winnings
1	12	10	Derrike Cope	Whitcomb Racing	Chevrolet	200	5	running	180	$188,150
2	20	1	Terry Labonte	Precision Products Racing	Oldsmobile	200	7	running	175	$117,800
3	4	9	Bill Elliott	Melling Racing	Ford	200	1	running	170	$114,100
4	19	5	Ricky Rudd	Hendrick Motorsports	Chevrolet	200	1	running	165	$77,050
5	2	3	Dale Earnhardt	Richard Childress Racing	Chevrolet	200	155	running	165	$109,325
6	10	8	Bobby Hillin Jr.	Stavola Brothers Racing	Buick	200	4	running	155	$63,225
7	38	27	Rusty Wallace	Blue Max Racing	Pontiac	200	0	running	146	$59,682
8	24	30	Michael Waltrip	Bahari Racing	Pontiac	199	0	running	142	$46,200
9	3	11	Geoff Bodine	Junior Johnson & Associates	Ford	199	8	running	143	$80,950
10	30	15	Morgan Shepherd	Bud Moore Engineering	Ford	199	0	running	134	$44,125
11	31	21	Neil Bonnett	Wood Brothers Racing	Ford	199	0	running	130	$38,400
12	32	66	Dick Trickle	Cale Yarborough Motorsports	Pontiac	199	0	running	127	$36,200
13	18	90	Ernie Irvan	Donlavey Racing	Ford	199	0	running	124	$31,455
14	9	17	Darrell Waltrip	Hendrick Motorsports	Chevrolet	199	0	running	121	$49,340
15	6	57	Jimmy Spencer	Osterlund Racing	Pontiac	199	4	running	123	$41,050
16	14	83	Lake Speed	Speed Racing	Oldsmobile	199	3	running	120	$29,930
17	33	26	Brett Bodine	King Racing	Buick	199	0	running	112	$27,160
18	5	33	Harry Gant	Leo Jackson Motorsports	Oldsmobile	199	1	running	114	$58,990
19	21	94	Sterling Marlin	Hagan Racing	Oldsmobile	198	0	running	106	$26,070
20	16	28	Davey Allison	Robert Yates Racing	Ford	198	2	running	108	$31,935
21	7	6	Mark Martin	Roush Racing	Ford	198	3	running	105	$39,955
22	17	98	Butch Miller	Travis Carter Enterprises	Chevrolet	198	0	running	97	$22,100
23	42	71	Dave Marcis	Marcis Auto Racing	Chevrolet	197	0	running	94	$22,995
24	22	42	Kyle Petty	SABCO Racing	Pontiac	196	0	handling	91	$21,640
25	23	47	Jack Pennington (R)	Close Racing	Oldsmobile	196	6	running	93	$20,935
26	27	32	Joe Ruttman	CalCar Motorsports	Pontiac	196	0	running	85	$22,950
27	26	16	Larry Pearson	Pearson Racing	Buick	195	0	running	82	$22,275
28	29	02	Rich Bickle	Bickle Racing	Oldsmobile	195	0	running	79	$19,120
29	37	52	Jimmy Means	Jimmy Means Racing	Pontiac	195	0	running	76	$19,090
30	28	75	Rick Wilson	RahMoc Enterprises	Oldsmobile	193	0	engine	73	$21,260
31	39	53	Jerry O'Neil (R)	Aroneck Racing	Oldsmobile	193	0	running	70	$17,805
32	41	2	Eddie Bierschwale	U.S. Racing	Oldsmobile	191	0	running	67	$20,125
33	34	68	Hut Stricklin	TriStar Motorsports	Chevrolet	190	0	running	64	$18,195
34	11	43	Richard Petty	Petty Enterprises	Pontiac	183	0	running	61	$22,840
35	25	7	Alan Kulwicki	AK Racing	Ford	180	0	running	58	$19,835
36	13	14	A. J. Foyt	A. J. Foyt Racing	Oldsmobile	115	0	quit	55	$18,380
37	40	80	Jimmy Horton	S&H Racing	Ford	108	0	drivetrain	52	$16,800
38	36	20	Rob Moroso (R)	Moroso Racing	Oldsmobile	82	0	accident	49	$15,595
39	35	73	Phil Barkdoll	Barkdoll Racing	Oldsmobile	64	0	engine	46	$15,610
40	1	25	Ken Schrader	Hendrick Motorsports	Chevrolet	58	0	engine	43	$34,900
41	15	12	Mike Alexander	Bobby Allison Motorsports	Buick	42	0	accident	40	$17,750
42	8	4	Phil Parsons	Morgan–McClure Motorsports	Oldsmobile	41	0	accident	37	$25,100
Official race results

== Standings after the race ==
Drivers' Championship standings

Pos	Driver	Points
1	Derrike Cope	180
2	Terry Labonte	175 (-5)
3	Bill Elliott	170 (-10)
4	Ricky Rudd	165 (–15)
5	Dale Earnhardt	165 (–15)
6	Bobby Hillin Jr.	155 (–25)
7	Rusty Wallace	146 (–34)
8	Geoff Bodine	143 (–37)
9	Rusty Wallace	142 (–38)
10	Morgan Shepherd	134 (–46)
Official driver's standings

- Note: Only the first 10 positions are included for the driver standings.

Previous race: 1989 Atlanta Journal 500	NASCAR Winston Cup Series; 1990 season	Next race: 1990 Pontiac Excitement 400
