= 1991 Daytona 500 =

First race of the 1991 NASCAR Winston Cup Series

1991 Daytona 500 By STP
Race details
- Race 1 of 29 in the 1991 NASCAR Winston Cup Series
- The 1991 Daytona 500 program cover, featuring Richard Petty.
- Date: February 17, 1991
- Official name: 33rd Annual Daytona 500 By STP
- Location: Daytona Beach, Florida, Daytona International Speedway
- Course: Permanent racing facility
- Course length: 2.5 miles (4.0 km)
- Distance: 200 laps, 500 mi (804.672 km)
- Average speed: 148.148 miles per hour (238.421 km/h)
- Attendance: 145,000

Pole position
Driver	Davey Allison	Robert Yates Racing
- Time: 45.929

Most laps led
Driver	Kyle Petty	SABCO Racing
- Laps: 51

Winner
No. 4	Ernie Irvan	Morgan–McClure Motorsports

Television in the United States
- Network: CBS
- Announcers: Ken Squier, David Hobbs, Ned Jarrett
- Nielsen ratings: 7.6/20 share

Radio in the United States
- Radio: Motor Racing Network

The 1991 Daytona 500 By STP was the first stock car race of the 1991 NASCAR Winston Cup Series season and the 33rd iteration of the event. The race was held on Sunday, February 17, 1991, before an audience of 145,000 in Daytona Beach, Florida at Daytona International Speedway, a 2.5 miles (4.0 km) permanent triangular-shaped superspeedway. The race took the scheduled 200 laps to complete.

Following a period of three late-race cautions, Morgan–McClure Motorsports driver Ernie Irvan took the lead from Dale Earnhardt with six laps left in the race. With three laps to go, Earnhardt spun and collected Davey Allison and Kyle Petty, bringing out the final caution with two laps left. Coasting to the finish on fumes, Irvan was able to take his second career NASCAR Winston Cup Series victory, his first victory of the season, and his only Daytona 500 victory. To fill out the top three, Junior Johnson & Associates driver Sterling Marlin and RahMoc Enterprises driver Joe Ruttman finished second and third, respectively.

== Background ==
The layout of Daytona International Speedway, the venue where the race was held.

Daytona International Speedway is one of two superspeedways to hold NASCAR races, the other being Talladega Superspeedway. The standard track at Daytona International Speedway is a four-turn superspeedway that is 2.5 miles (4.0 km) long. The track's turns are banked at 31 degrees, while the front stretch, the location of the finish line, is banked at 18 degrees.

== Pit rules ==
This race began a series of changes to pit road procedure after the death of a Melling Racing rear tire changer in a pit road accident at Atlanta the previous November.

- Changing tires under caution was banned, under any circumstances. Any tire changed under caution (even if it was flat) resulted in a one-lap penalty.
- The signboard man was banned from standing in the pit lane. Instead, teams would utilize signboards on a long pole (i.e. the "lollipop") held by a crew member behind the wall.
- Each car was given a sticker based on their starting position. The sticker was placed on the steering wheel for easy reference. The pit stall selection was staggered to prevent drivers in neighboring stalls from pitting at the same time:
  - Cars starting in odd-numbered positions were given a blue sticker with a white 1 on it; their pit stalls were selected from the odd-numbered stalls.
  - Cars starting in even-numbered positions were given an orange sticker with a white 2 on it; their pit stalls were selected from the even-numbered stalls.
- After a restart from a caution, the pits would be closed. On the second green lap, a blue flag was waved at the entrance of pit road, allowing only the cars with the blue stickers (odd) to pit for tires. On the next time around, an orange flag would be waved, allowing the cars with orange stickers (even) to pit for tires.
- A new pit road speed limit was implemented at all times. During cautions, a second pace car was added, which would lead the cars entering the pits, and set the speed down the pit lane.
- Penalties were severe: a 1-lap penalty for changing tires during a caution or pitting with the wrong group (blue/orange). A 15-second penalty for overshooting the pit stall, or for crew members jumping over the wall too soon.

The new pit procedures changed the complexity of the race. Teams considered it too time-consuming to change four tires since it had to be done under green (at the time, a four-tire pit stop would take roughly 20–25 seconds). For an example of how the rules adversely affected the racing, Kyle Petty ran the entire 500 miles on the same left side tires. Bill Elliott suffered a flat tire early on, and was forced to limp around the track at a reduced pace for two laps before he was allowed to pit, effectively eliminating him from the competition.

By April, the rules were changed. At Bristol, the blue/orange procedure was used only for cautions. The pits were closed at the onset of caution, then opened after the pace car had picked up the leader and the field was sufficiently "packed-up" (that usually took one lap). Once the pits were opened, blue sticker cars would pit the first lap by, with orange sticker cars pitting the next time around. On the restarts, blue sticker cars started on the inside and orange sticker cars on the outside. Lapped cars went to the rear. The blue/orange rule was eliminated during green flag stops. By the next week at North Wilkesboro, the blue/orange rule was scrapped. In its place, once the pits were opened during a yellow, lead lap cars only were allowed to pit on the first lap under caution, while lapped cars had to wait until the second lap.

After a few weeks, the rules were relaxed further. The pit road speed limit and use of the "lollipop" style signboard were the significant changes made permanent (and remain to this day). The second pace car for the pit lane was eliminated. Drivers would be required to gauge their own pit lane speed (by monitoring their RPMs) and officials enforced the infractions with a system similar to VASCAR. The rule closing pit road when the caution comes out also remained in place, as well as only permitting lead lap cars to pit on the first caution lap (lapped cars on the second).

=== Entry list ===
- (R) denotes rookie driver.

#	Driver	Team	Make
0	Delma Cowart	H. L. Waters Racing	Ford
1	Rick Mast	Precision Products Racing	Oldsmobile
2	Rusty Wallace	Penske Racing South	Pontiac
3	Dale Earnhardt	Richard Childress Racing	Chevrolet
4	Ernie Irvan	Morgan–McClure Motorsports	Chevrolet
5	Ricky Rudd	Hendrick Motorsports	Chevrolet
6	Mark Martin	Roush Racing	Ford
7	Alan Kulwicki	AK Racing	Ford
8	Rick Wilson	Stavola Brothers Racing	Buick
9	Bill Elliott	Melling Racing	Ford
10	Derrike Cope	Whitcomb Racing	Chevrolet
11	Geoff Bodine	Junior Johnson & Associates	Ford
12	Hut Stricklin	Bobby Allison Motorsports	Buick
13	Brian Ross	Linro Motorsports	Buick
15	Morgan Shepherd	Bud Moore Engineering	Ford
17	Darrell Waltrip	Darrell Waltrip Motorsports	Chevrolet
18	Greg Sacks	Hendrick Motorsports	Chevrolet
19	Chad Little	Little Racing	Ford
20	Sammy Swindell	Moroso Racing	Oldsmobile
21	Dale Jarrett	Wood Brothers Racing	Ford
22	Sterling Marlin	Junior Johnson & Associates	Ford
23	Eddie Bierschwale	B&B Racing	Oldsmobile
24	Mickey Gibbs	Team III Racing	Pontiac
25	Ken Schrader	Hendrick Motorsports	Chevrolet
26	Brett Bodine	King Racing	Buick
27	Bobby Hillin Jr.	Moroso Racing	Oldsmobile
28	Davey Allison	Robert Yates Racing	Ford
30	Michael Waltrip	Bahari Racing	Pontiac
33	Harry Gant	Leo Jackson Motorsports	Oldsmobile
34	Gary Balough	AAG Racing	Chevrolet
35	Bill Venturini	Venturini Motorsports	Chevrolet
39	Blackie Wangerin	Wangerin Racing	Ford
42	Kyle Petty	SABCO Racing	Pontiac
43	Richard Petty	Petty Enterprises	Pontiac
45	Philip Duffie	Fulcher Racing	Oldsmobile
47	Rich Bickle	Close Racing	Oldsmobile
51	Jeff Purvis (R)	Phoenix Racing	Oldsmobile
52	Jimmy Means	Jimmy Means Racing	Pontiac
55	Ted Musgrave (R)	U.S. Racing	Pontiac
65	Dave Mader III	Folsom Racing	Chevrolet
66	Dick Trickle	Cale Yarborough Motorsports	Pontiac
68	Bobby Hamilton (R)	TriStar Motorsports	Oldsmobile
69	Dorsey Schroeder	LC Racing	Ford
70	J. D. McDuffie	McDuffie Racing	Pontiac
71	Dave Marcis	Marcis Auto Racing	Chevrolet
72	Chuck Bown	Tex Racing	Oldsmobile
73	Phil Barkdoll	Barkdoll Racing	Oldsmobile
75	Joe Ruttman	RahMoc Enterprises	Oldsmobile
80	Jimmy Horton	S&H Racing	Chevrolet
82	Mark Stahl	Stahl Racing	Ford
88	Buddy Baker	Osterlund Racing	Pontiac
89	Jim Sauter	Mueller Brothers Racing	Pontiac
90	Robby Gordon	Donlavey Racing	Ford
94	Terry Labonte	Hagan Racing	Oldsmobile
95	Rick Jeffrey	Sadler Brothers Racing	Chevrolet
96	Phil Parsons	Italian Connection Racing	Chevrolet
98	Jimmy Spencer	Travis Carter Enterprises	Chevrolet
99	Brad Teague	Ball Motorsports	Chevrolet

- A notable absentee was 1972 Daytona 500 winner A. J. Foyt. Foyt was badly injured in the Texaco-Havoline 200 IndyCar race at Road America in the fall of 1990. He suffered severe injuries to his feet and legs, and spent several months out of a racecar before returning to action at Indianapolis in May 1991. Foyt missed his first Daytona 500 since 1965.

== Qualifying ==
Qualifying was set by the 1991 Gatorade Twin 125 Qualifiers. The top two positions were set by qualifying speeds held for the Twin 125 Qualifiers held on Saturday, February 9, with the top two qualifiers in the session earning the top two positions for the Daytona 500. The rest of the starting was set in the Twin 125 Qualifiers, held on Thursday, February 14 during two races. The top 14 finishers in the first race, excluding the pole position winner, would set the inside row from rows two to 15, and the top 14 finishers in the second race, excluding the outside pole position winner, would set the outside row from rows two to 15. The remaining non-qualifiers would set positions 31-40 based on qualifying speeds from the first qualifying session held on Saturday. If needed, up to two extra provisionals were given to teams high enough in the previous season's owner's standings that did not qualify for the race by either qualifying speed or from the Twin 125 Qualifiers.

Davey Allison, driving for Robert Yates Racing, won the pole with a time of 45.929 and an average speed of 195.955 miles per hour (315.359 km/h) in Saturday's session.

16 drivers failed to qualify.

=== Full qualifying results ===
Pos.	#	Driver	Team	Make	Reason
1	28	Davey Allison	Robert Yates Racing	Ford	Qualified on pole
2	4	Ernie Irvan	Morgan–McClure Motorsports	Chevrolet	Qualified on outside pole
3	43	Richard Petty	Petty Enterprises	Pontiac	Second in Twin 125 #1
4	3	Dale Earnhardt	Richard Childress Racing	Chevrolet	First in Twin 125 #2
5	12	Hut Stricklin	Bobby Allison Motorsports	Buick	Third in Twin 125 #1
6	42	Kyle Petty	SABCO Racing	Pontiac	Third in Twin 125 #2
7	1	Rick Mast	Precision Products Racing	Oldsmobile	Fourth in Twin 125 #1
8	2	Rusty Wallace	Penske Racing South	Pontiac	Fourth in Twin 125 #2
9	5	Ricky Rudd	Hendrick Motorsports	Chevrolet	Fifth in Twin 125 #1
10	17	Darrell Waltrip	Hendrick Motorsports	Chevrolet	Fifth in Twin 125 #2
11	33	Harry Gant	Leo Jackson Motorsports	Oldsmobile	Sixth in Twin 125 #1
12	22	Sterling Marlin	Junior Johnson & Associates	Ford	Sixth in Twin 125 #2
13	30	Michael Waltrip	Bahari Racing	Pontiac	Seventh in Twin 125 #1
14	75	Joe Ruttman	RahMoc Enterprises	Oldsmobile	Seventh in Twin 125 #2
15	9	Bill Elliott	Melling Racing	Ford	Eighth in Twin 125 #1
16	88	Buddy Baker	Osterlund Racing	Pontiac	Eighth in Twin 125 #2
17	21	Dale Jarrett	Wood Brothers Racing	Ford	Ninth in Twin 125 #1
18	6	Mark Martin	Roush Racing	Ford	Ninth in Twin 125 #2
19	11	Geoff Bodine	Junior Johnson & Associates	Ford	Tenth in Twin 125 #1
20	68	Bobby Hamilton (R)	TriStar Motorsports	Oldsmobile	Tenth in Twin 125 #2
21	89	Jim Sauter	Mueller Brothers Racing	Pontiac	11th in Twin 125 #1
22	51	Jeff Purvis (R)	Phoenix Racing	Oldsmobile	11th in Twin 125 #2
23	98	Jimmy Spencer	Travis Carter Enterprises	Chevrolet	12th in Twin 125 #1
24	25	Ken Schrader	Hendrick Motorsports	Chevrolet	12th in Twin 125 #2
25	18	Greg Sacks	Hendrick Motorsports	Chevrolet	13th in Twin 125 #1
26	8	Rick Wilson	Stavola Brothers Racing	Buick	13th in Twin 125 #2
27	7	Alan Kulwicki	AK Racing	Ford	14th in Twin 125 #1
28	66	Dick Trickle	Cale Yarborough Motorsports	Pontiac	14th in Twin 125 #2
29	73	Phil Barkdoll	Barkdoll Racing	Oldsmobile	15th in Twin 125 #1
30	19	Chad Little	Little Racing	Ford	15th in Twin 125 #2
31	94	Terry Labonte	Hagan Racing	Oldsmobile	Speed provisional (193.228)
32	20	Sammy Swindell	Moroso Racing	Oldsmobile	Speed provisional (192.740)
33	10	Derrike Cope	Whitcomb Racing	Chevrolet	Speed provisional (192.336)
34	15	Morgan Shepherd	Bud Moore Engineering	Ford	Speed provisional (192.254)
35	90	Robby Gordon	Donlavey Racing	Ford	Speed provisional (192.238)
36	27	Bobby Hillin Jr.	Moroso Racing	Oldsmobile	Speed provisional (192.160)
37	55	Ted Musgrave (R)	U.S. Racing	Pontiac	Speed provisional (192.127)
38	24	Mickey Gibbs	Team III Racing	Pontiac	Speed provisional (192.053)
39	52	Jimmy Means	Jimmy Means Racing	Pontiac	Speed provisional (191.697)
40	23	Eddie Bierschwale	B&B Racing	Oldsmobile	Speed provisional (191.608)
41	26	Brett Bodine	King Racing	Buick	Owner's points provisional
42	71	Dave Marcis	Marcis Auto Racing	Chevrolet	Owner's points provisional
Failed to qualify
43	47	Rich Bickle	Close Racing	Oldsmobile	19th in Twin 125 #1
44	95	Rick Jeffrey	Sadler Brothers Racing	Chevrolet	19th in Twin 125 #2
45	13	Brian Ross	Linro Motorsports	Buick	20th in Twin 125 #1
46	34	Gary Balough	AAG Racing	Chevrolet	20th in Twin 125 #2
47	80	Jimmy Horton	S&H Racing	Chevrolet	21st in Twin 125 #1
48	70	J. D. McDuffie	McDuffie Racing	Pontiac	21st in Twin 125 #2
49	65	Dave Mader III	Folsom Racing	Chevrolet	22nd in Twin 125 #1
50	96	Phil Parsons	Italian Connection Racing	Chevrolet	22nd in Twin 125 #2
51	69	Dorsey Schroeder	LC Racing	Ford	23rd in Twin 125 #1
52	35	Bill Venturini	Venturini Motorsports	Chevrolet	23rd in Twin 125 #2
53	45	Philip Duffie	Fulcher Racing	Oldsmobile	25th in Twin 125 #1
54	72	Chuck Bown	Tex Racing	Oldsmobile	24th in Twin 125 #2
55	0	Delma Cowart	H. L. Waters Racing	Ford	28th in Twin 125 #1
56	99	Brad Teague	Ball Motorsports	Chevrolet	25th in Twin 125 #2
57	82	Mark Stahl	Stahl Racing	Ford	29th in Twin 125 #1
58	39	Blackie Wangerin	Wangerin Racing	Ford	28th in Twin 125 #2
Official Twin 125s Qualifiers results
Official starting lineup

== Race ==
=== The start ===
Davey Allison led the first lap, but was soon passed on lap two by Dale Earnhardt, who took the lead entering Turn 1. Shortly into the race, Earnhardt hit a seagull with the left-front corner of his car. This adversely affected his car's water temperature, raising it at one point to 240 °F or 116 °C. It forced Earnhardt's team to make emergency repairs under one of the many early cautions in the race.

=== Early yellows ===
Sprint car champion Sammy Swindell spun on the backstretch to bring out the first yellow flag. Five laps after the restart, Rick Wilson and Greg Sacks collided in Turn 1, ending Sacks' day. Just after the restart, Bill Elliott cut a tire, but had to wait for the proper lap for a pit stop. On lap 31, Jimmy Spencer's engine blew, filling the car with smoke. A fire also erupted just after Jimmy Spencer climbed out to catch his breath. Meanwhile, turn 4 was coated with oil, gathering Jeff Purvis, Jimmy Means, Phil Barkdoll, and again Sammy Swindell. Barkdoll would soon spin again in Turn 4, blowing out his windshield in the spin and nearly flipping. The windshield slid across the track and into Ken Schrader's bumper and air dam, puncturing the radiator and causing a lengthy repair that eliminated the three-time Daytona 500 polesitter from contention. 1990 Winston Cup runner-up Mark Martin moved through the field quickly in the early going, but was also eliminated from contention as the center section of the car's rear gearing sheared completely off the driveshaft, causing him to spend many laps behind the wall.

=== Long green flag run ===
On Lap 75, Geoff Bodine, Eddie Bierschwale and Phil Barkdoll ran three-wide coming out of turn 4. Bierschwale slid up the track and into Bodine's left-rear quarter panel, sending Bodine into a spin and into Jim Sauter, who was slowing to enter the pits. The caution flag came out and all four cars continued in the race. However, Bodine spent several laps in the pits because the rim of his left-rear wheel had been so badly warped in the collision that the crew could not remove the lug nuts to change the now flat left-rear tire. This incident effectively eliminated Bodine from contention and he later retired with an oil leak.

This would be the last caution flag for over 100 laps, and the new pit rules confused the running order during the long green flag run. The lead changed hands many times, as Dale Earnhardt, Joe Ruttman, Davey Allison, Sterling Marlin, Rick Mast, Kyle Petty, Ernie Irvan, and Darrell Waltrip had all pitted on varying laps.

=== Late-race drama ===
With 16 laps to go, Richard Petty and off-road racer Robby Gordon tangled on the backstretch. Polesitter and leader Davey Allison pitted with the leaders, allowing Rusty Wallace to take the lead. He was quickly shuffled off the lead on the restart, and was touched by Kyle Petty in Turn 4, which broke the car loose and sent him into a spin. Rick Mast narrowly avoided Wallace, but Darrell Waltrip, unsighted, collided with Wallace's left rear quarter panel, before Wallace slammed into the inside retaining wall, eliminating both cars. Seconds later, Derrike Cope lost control entering the tri-oval while trying to avoid Waltrip's damaged car. Cope spun across the infield and back across the track almost at the start/finish line and into the path of Hut Stricklin. With nowhere to go, Stricklin slammed nearly head-on into the rear of Cope's car, sending him bouncing off Harry Gant's car and down the straightaway with no brakes and virtually no steering. At the final restart on lap 193, the order was Earnhardt, Irvan, Petty, Ruttman, Marlin, Mast, and Allison, the only cars remaining on the lead lap. Leader Dale Earnhardt was passed by Ernie Irvan a lap after the green flag returned, and Davey Allison made up four positions in one lap to run third. Irvan began to pull away while Earnhardt spent several laps battling Davey Allison for 2nd. With 2 laps to go, Earnhardt got loose while running side by side under Allison exiting turn 2. The two cars tapped each other, pushing Allison into the outside wall briefly before the car spun into the infield towards Lake Lloyd, slamming into the earthen embankment as Allison had done early in the 1989 race. Earnhardt spun down the backstretch and into the path of Kyle Petty, who slammed into Earnhardt's right front fender, launching the car into the air briefly before it landed back on its wheels. Ernie Irvan coasted to the checkers to become the first Californian since Marvin Panch in 1961 to win the Daytona 500.

== Race results ==
Fin	St	#	Driver	Team	Make	Laps	Led	Status	Pts	Winnings
1	2	4	Ernie Irvan	Morgan–McClure Motorsports	Chevrolet	200	29	running	180	$233,000
2	12	22	Sterling Marlin	Junior Johnson & Associates	Ford	200	7	running	175	$133,925
3	14	75	Joe Ruttman	RahMoc Enterprises	Oldsmobile	200	11	running	170	$111,450
4	7	1	Rick Mast	Precision Products Racing	Oldsmobile	200	14	running	165	$100,900
5	4	3	Dale Earnhardt	Richard Childress Racing	Chevrolet	200	46	running	160	$113,850
6	17	21	Dale Jarrett	Wood Brothers Racing	Ford	199	0	running	150	$74,900
7	36	27	Bobby Hillin Jr.	Moroso Racing	Oldsmobile	199	0	running	146	$50,925
8	27	7	Alan Kulwicki	AK Racing	Ford	199	0	running	142	$52,450
9	9	5	Ricky Rudd	Hendrick Motorsports	Chevrolet	199	0	running	138	$52,600
10	20	68	Bobby Hamilton (R)	TriStar Motorsports	Oldsmobile	199	0	running	134	$43,500
11	28	66	Dick Trickle	Cale Yarborough Motorsports	Pontiac	199	0	running	130	$39,525
12	40	23	Eddie Bierschwale	B&B Racing	Oldsmobile	199	0	running	127	$31,550
13	31	94	Terry Labonte	Hagan Racing	Oldsmobile	198	0	running	124	$34,355
14	30	19	Chad Little	Little Racing	Ford	198	0	running	121	$29,540
15	1	28	Davey Allison	Robert Yates Racing	Ford	197	26	running	123	$77,350
16	6	42	Kyle Petty	SABCO Racing	Pontiac	197	51	accident	125	$41,580
17	38	24	Mickey Gibbs	Team III Racing	Pontiac	197	0	running	112	$24,560
18	35	90	Robby Gordon	Donlavey Racing	Ford	196	0	running	109	$23,740
19	3	43	Richard Petty	Petty Enterprises	Pontiac	195	0	running	106	$43,120
20	29	73	Phil Barkdoll	Barkdoll Racing	Oldsmobile	194	0	running	103	$24,160
21	18	6	Mark Martin	Roush Racing	Ford	193	0	running	100	$31,955
22	41	26	Brett Bodine	King Racing	Buick	193	0	running	97	$23,400
23	21	89	Jim Sauter	Mueller Brothers Racing	Pontiac	192	0	running	94	$21,845
24	10	17	Darrell Waltrip	Hendrick Motorsports	Chevrolet	190	13	accident	96	$25,540
25	11	33	Harry Gant	Leo Jackson Motorsports	Oldsmobile	190	0	accident	88	$26,385
26	33	10	Derrike Cope	Whitcomb Racing	Chevrolet	189	0	accident	85	$28,180
27	8	2	Rusty Wallace	Penske Racing South	Pontiac	188	3	accident	87	$26,425
28	15	9	Bill Elliott	Melling Racing	Ford	188	0	running	79	$28,670
29	5	12	Hut Stricklin	Bobby Allison Motorsports	Buick	185	0	accident	76	$33,865
30	37	55	Ted Musgrave (R)	U.S. Racing	Pontiac	180	0	running	73	$18,710
31	24	25	Ken Schrader	Hendrick Motorsports	Chevrolet	176	0	running	70	$22,330
32	19	11	Geoff Bodine	Junior Johnson & Associates	Ford	150	0	oil leak	67	$28,150
33	26	8	Rick Wilson	Stavola Brothers Racing	Buick	137	0	running	64	$21,545
34	34	15	Morgan Shepherd	Bud Moore Engineering	Ford	70	0	piston	61	$23,490
35	42	71	Dave Marcis	Marcis Auto Racing	Chevrolet	40	0	valve	58	$19,185
36	22	51	Jeff Purvis (R)	Phoenix Racing	Oldsmobile	37	0	overheating	55	$18,360
37	16	88	Buddy Baker	Osterlund Racing	Pontiac	35	0	engine	52	$18,800
38	13	30	Michael Waltrip	Bahari Racing	Pontiac	35	0	piston	49	$21,520
39	39	52	Jimmy Means	Jimmy Means Racing	Pontiac	29	0	accident	46	$17,660
40	23	98	Jimmy Spencer	Travis Carter Enterprises	Chevrolet	29	0	fire	43	$20,200
41	32	20	Sammy Swindell	Moroso Racing	Oldsmobile	28	0	accident	40	$16,500
42	25	18	Greg Sacks	Hendrick Motorsports	Chevrolet	20	0	accident	37	$17,450
Failed to qualify
43		47	Rich Bickle	Close Racing	Oldsmobile					
44		95	Rick Jeffrey	Sadler Brothers Racing	Chevrolet					
45		13	Brian Ross	Linro Motorsports	Buick					
46		34	Gary Balough	AAG Racing	Chevrolet					
47		80	Jimmy Horton	S&H Racing	Chevrolet					
48		70	J. D. McDuffie	McDuffie Racing	Pontiac					
49		65	Dave Mader III	Folsom Racing	Chevrolet					
50		96	Phil Parsons	Italian Connection Racing	Chevrolet					
51		69	Dorsey Schroeder	LC Racing	Ford					
52		35	Bill Venturini	Venturini Motorsports	Chevrolet					
53		45	Philip Duffie	Fulcher Racing	Oldsmobile					
54		72	Chuck Bown	Tex Racing	Oldsmobile					
55		0	Delma Cowart	H. L. Waters Racing	Ford					
56		99	Brad Teague	Ball Motorsports	Chevrolet					
57		82	Mark Stahl	Stahl Racing	Ford					
58		39	Blackie Wangerin	Wangerin Racing	Ford					
Official race results

== Standings after the race ==
Drivers' Championship standings

Pos	Driver	Points
1	Ernie Irvan	180
2	Sterling Marlin	175 (-5)
3	Joe Ruttman	170 (-10)
4	Rick Mast	165 (–15)
5	Dale Earnhardt	160 (–20)
6	Dale Jarrett	150 (–30)
7	Bobby Hillin Jr.	146 (–34)
8	Alan Kulwicki	142 (–38)
9	Ricky Rudd	138 (–42)
10	Bobby Hamilton	134 (–46)
Official driver's standings

- Note: Only the first 10 positions are included for the driver standings.

Previous race: 1990 Atlanta Journal 500	NASCAR Winston Cup Series; 1991 season	Next race: 1991 Pontiac Excitement 400
