= Blackie Wangerin =

Ervin "Blackie" Wangerin
- Born: April 4, 1935; Bloomington, Minnesota, U.S.
- Died: April 14, 2024 (aged 89); Daytona Beach, Florida, U.S.

NASCAR Cup Series career
- 27 races run over 9 years
- Best finish: 35th (1979)
- First race: 1971 Daytona 500 Qualifier #2 (Daytona)
- Last race: 1984 Warner W. Hodgdon Carolina 500 (Rockingham)
Wins	Top tens	Poles
0	0	0

Ervin "Blackie" Wangerin (April 4, 1935 – April 14, 2024) was an American NASCAR Winston Cup driver from Bloomington, Minnesota. In 1971, he attempted to qualify for the Daytona 500 but did not make it past the qualifying race. He returned to the series in 1977 and made at least one start every season thereafter until 1984. In 1978, he made ten starts with a best finish of fifteenth at Pocono Raceway and finished 37th in points. The following year he made seven starts with another best finish of fifteenth, this time at Charlotte Motor Speedway, and despite making three fewer starts, finished two places better in 35th. Wangerin never drove in more than three races in a season after that and made his final Cup start in the 1984 Warner W. Hodgdon Carolina 500 at Rockingham.

Wangerin's son Troy is also a stock car driver who as of 2009 participated part-time in the ARCA RE/MAX series.

Wangerin died in Daytona Beach, Florida on April 14, 2024, at the age of 89.

== Motorsports career results ==
=== NASCAR ===
(key) (Bold – Pole position awarded by qualifying time. Italics – Pole position earned by points standings or practice time. * – Most laps led.)

==== Grand National Series ====
NASCAR Grand National Series results
Year	Team	No.	Make	1	2	3	4	5	6	7	8	9	10	11	12	13	14	15	16	17	18	19	20	21	22	23	24	25	26	27	28	29	30	31	32	33	34	35	36	37	38	39	40	41	42	43	44	45	46	47	48	NGNC	Pts	Ref
1971	Wangerin Racing	38	Ford	RSD	DAY	DAY; 29	DAY; DNQ	ONT	RCH	CAR	HCY	BRI	ATL	CLB	GPS	SMR	NWS	MAR	DAR	SBO	TAL	ASH	KPT	CLT	DOV	MCH	RSD	HOU	GPS	DAY	BRI	AST	ISP	TRN	NSV	ATL	BGS	ONA	MCH	TAL	CLB	HCY	DAR	MAR	CLT	DOV	CAR	MGR	RCH	NWS	TWS	NA	0	

==== Winston Cup Series ====
NASCAR Winston Cup Series results
Year	Team	No.	Make	1	2	3	4	5	6	7	8	9	10	11	12	13	14	15	16	17	18	19	20	21	22	23	24	25	26	27	28	29	30	31	NWCC	Pts	Ref
1976	Wangerin Racing	39	Ford	RSD	DAY; DNQ	CAR	RCH	BRI	ATL	NWS	DAR	MAR	TAL	NSV	DOV	CLT	RSD	MCH	DAY	NSV	POC	TAL	MCH	BRI	DAR	RCH	DOV	MAR	NWS	CLT	CAR	ATL	ONT		NA	-	
1977	Wangerin Racing	39	Mercury	RSD	DAY; DNQ	RCH	CAR	ATL	NWS	DAR	BRI	MAR	TAL	NSV	DOV	CLT	RSD	MCH	DAY	NSV	POC	TAL	MCH	BRI	DAR	RCH	DOV	MAR	NWS	CLT	CAR	ATL; 24	ONT		NA	0	
1978	Wangerin Racing	39	Mercury	RSD	DAY; 36	RCH	CAR	ATL; 29	BRI	DAR; 19	NWS	MAR	TAL; 30	DOV	CLT	NSV	RSD	MCH; 32	DAY; 31	NSV	POC; 15	TAL; 40	MCH; 25	BRI	DAR; 33	RCH	DOV	MAR	NWS	CLT	CAR	ATL	ONT		37th	760	
1979	Wangerin Racing	39	Mercury	RSD	DAY; 20	CAR	RCH	ATL; 30	NWS	BRI	DAR	MAR	TAL; 28	NSV	DOV	CLT; 15	TWS	RSD	MCH	DAY; 24	NSV	POC	TAL; 37	MCH; 36	BRI	DAR	RCH	DOV	MAR	CLT	NWS	CAR	ATL	ONT	35th	571	
1980	Wangerin Racing	39	Mercury	RSD	DAY; DNQ	RCH	CAR	ATL	BRI	DAR	NWS	MAR	TAL	NSV	DOV	CLT; 13	TWS	RSD	MCH	DAY	NSV	POC	TAL	MCH	BRI	DAR; 37	RCH	DOV	NWS	MAR	CLT	CAR	ATL; 34	ONT	63rd	237	
1981	Wangerin Racing	39	Ford	RSD	DAY; 42	RCH	CAR	ATL	BRI	NWS	DAR	MAR	TAL	NSV	DOV	CLT	TWS	RSD	MCH	DAY	NSV	POC	TAL	MCH	BRI	DAR	RCH	DOV	MAR	NWS	CLT	CAR	ATL	RSD	104th	37	
1982	Wangerin Racing	39	Ford	DAY; DNQ	RCH	BRI	ATL	CAR	DAR	NWS	MAR	TAL	NSV	DOV	CLT	POC	RSD	MCH	DAY; 30	NSV	POC	TAL	MCH	BRI	DAR	RCH	DOV	NWS	CLT; DNQ	MAR	CAR	ATL	RSD		95th	73	
1983	Wangerin Racing	39	Ford	DAY; DNQ	RCH; DNQ	CAR	ATL	DAR	NWS	MAR	TAL	NSV	DOV	BRI	CLT	RSD	POC	MCH	DAY; 39	NSV	POC	TAL	MCH; DNQ	BRI	DAR	RCH	DOV	MAR	NWS	CLT	CAR; 34	ATL; 40	RSD		80th	-	
1984	Wangerin Racing	39	Ford	DAY; DNQ	RCH	CAR; 36	ATL	BRI	NWS	DAR	MAR	TAL	NSV	DOV	CLT	RSD	POC	MCH	DAY	NSV	POC	TAL; DNQ	MCH	BRI	DAR	RCH	DOV	MAR	CLT; DNQ	NWS	CAR	ATL	RSD		NA	0	
1985	Wangerin Racing	39	Ford	DAY	RCH	CAR	ATL	BRI	DAR	NWS	MAR	TAL; DNQ	DOV	CLT	RSD	POC	MCH	DAY	POC	TAL	MCH	BRI	DAR	RCH	DOV	MAR	NWS	CLT	CAR	ATL; DNQ	RSD				NA	-	
1986	Wangerin Racing	39	Ford	DAY; DNQ	RCH	CAR	ATL	BRI	DAR	NWS	MAR	TAL	DOV	CLT	RSD	POC	MCH	DAY; DNQ	POC	TAL	GLN	MCH	BRI	DAR	RCH	DOV	MAR	NWS	CLT	CAR	ATL	RSD			NA	-	
1987	Wangerin Racing	39	Ford	DAY; DNQ	CAR	RCH	ATL	DAR	NWS	BRI	MAR	TAL; DNQ	CLT	DOV	POC	RSD	MCH	DAY; DNQ	POC	TAL	GLN	MCH	BRI	DAR	RCH	DOV	MAR	NWS	CLT	CAR	RSD	ATL			NA	-	
1988	Wangerin Racing	39	Ford	DAY; DNQ	RCH	CAR	ATL	DAR	BRI	NWS	MAR	TAL	CLT	DOV	RSD	POC	MCH	DAY; DNQ	POC	TAL	GLN	MCH	BRI	DAR	RCH	DOV	MAR	CLT	NWS	CAR	PHO	ATL			NA	-	
1990	Wangerin Racing	39	Ford	DAY; DNQ	RCH	CAR	ATL	DAR	BRI	NWS	MAR	TAL	CLT	DOV	SON	POC	MCH	DAY	POC	TAL	GLN	MCH	BRI	DAR	RCH	DOV	MAR	NWS	CLT	CAR	PHO	ATL			NA	-	
1991	Wangerin Racing	39	Ford	DAY; DNQ	RCH	CAR	ATL	DAR	BRI	NWS	MAR	TAL	CLT	DOV	SON	POC	MCH	DAY	POC	TAL	GLN	MCH	BRI	DAR	RCH	DOV	MAR	NWS	CLT	CAR	PHO	ATL			NA	-	

===== Daytona 500 =====
Year	Team	Manufacturer	Start	Finish
1971	Wangerin Racing	Ford	DNQ	
1976	Wangerin Racing	Ford	DNQ	
1977	Wangerin Racing	Mercury	DNQ	
1978	Wangerin Racing	Mercury	29	36
1979	Wangerin Racing	Mercury	36	20
1980	Wangerin Racing	Mercury	DNQ	
1981	Wangerin Racing	Ford	30	42
1982	Wangerin Racing	Ford	DNQ	
1983	Wangerin Racing	Ford	DNQ	
1984	Wangerin Racing	Ford	DNQ	
1986	Wangerin Racing	Ford	DNQ	
1987	Wangerin Racing	Ford	DNQ	
1988	Wangerin Racing	Ford	DNQ	
1990	Wangerin Racing	Ford	DNQ	
1991	Wangerin Racing	Ford	DNQ	

=== ARCA Permatex SuperCar Series ===
(key) (Bold – Pole position awarded by qualifying time. Italics – Pole position earned by points standings or practice time. * – Most laps led.)

ARCA Permatex SuperCar Series results
Year	Team	No.	Make	1	2	3	4	5	6	7	8	9	10	11	12	13	14	15	16	17	18	19	20	21	22	23	24	25	26	27	28	APSC	Pts	Ref
1970	Wangerin Racing	03	Ford	TAL	DAY; 10																											NA	0	
1970	Wangerin Racing	39	Ford			TAL; 13	QCS	TOL	DSP; 6	LCF	SHA	TAL; 31	BLN	LCF	EXP	GSS	MAD	FMS; 26	FRS	TOL	SLM	QCS										NA	0	
1971	Wangerin Racing	39	Ford	SLM; 7	NSV	DAY; 23	SLM	QCS	TOL	FMS	NSV	QCS	MAD	WIR	IRP																	NA	0	
1971	Wangerin Racing	38	Ford													WIR; 19	TOL	SHA	BFS	FMS	CCF	FRS	TOL	NBS								NA	0	
1972	Wangerin Racing	39	Ford	SLM	DAY; 7	FMS	WIN	I70	SLM	QCS	LCF	ELD	IRP	NBS	WIN	TOL	SHA	SLM	FMS	TOL	CCF	FRS	QCS	NBS								NA	0	
1973	Wangerin Racing	39	Ford	TWS; 13	SLM																											NA	0	
1973		09	Ford			DAY; 28	FMS	SLM	TOL	QCS	SEL	LIN	CAR	LFS	MAD	TOL	MCS	BFS	NSV	QCS	TOL	SLM	HEI	SHA	FRS	FMS	BLN	MCS	LCS	TMS	NBS	NA	0	
1974	Wangerin Racing	39	Ford	SLM	DAY; 13	NSV	MCS	SLM	QCS	IRP	MIS	NSV	FRS	TOL	FMS																	NA	0	
1984	Wangerin Racing	39	Ford	DAY	ATL	TAL	CSP	SMS	FRS	MCS	LCS	IRP	TAL; 12	FRS	ISF	DSF	TOL	MGR														NA	0	
1991	Wangerin Racing	39	Ford	DAY	ATL	KIL	TAL	TOL	FRS	POC	MCH	KIL	FRS	DEL	POC	TAL	HPT	MCH; 21	ISF	TOL	DSF	TWS; 40	ATL									96th	-	
Results before 1985 may be incomplete.
