= 1988 Miller High Life 400 (Michigan) =

14th race of the 1988 NASCAR Winston Cup Series

Race details
- Race 14 of 29 in the 1988 NASCAR Winston Cup Series
- The 1988 Miller High Life 400 program cover, featuring Bobby Hillin Jr. and Bobby Allison. Artwork by NASCAR artist Sam Bass.
- Date: June 26, 1988
- Official name: 20th Annual Miller High Life 400
- Location: Brooklyn, Michigan, Michigan International Speedway
- Course: Permanent racing facility
- Course length: 2 miles (3.218 km)
- Distance: 200 laps, 400 mi (643.737 km)
- Average speed: 153.551 miles per hour (247.116 km/h)
- Attendance: 70,000

Pole position
Driver	Bill Elliott	Melling Racing
- Time: 41.694

Most laps led
Driver	Rusty Wallace	Blue Max Racing
- Laps: 106

Winner
No. 27	Rusty Wallace	Blue Max Racing

Television in the United States
- Network: CBS
- Announcers: Ken Squier, Ned Jarrett, Chris Economaki

Radio in the United States
- Radio: Motor Racing Network

The 1988 Miller High Life 400 was the 14th stock car race of the 1988 NASCAR Winston Cup Series season and the 20th iteration of the event. The race was held on Sunday, June 26, 1988, before an audience of 70,000 in Brooklyn, Michigan, at Michigan International Speedway, a two-mile (3.2 km) moderate-banked D-shaped speedway. The race took the scheduled 200 laps to complete. In the final 29 laps of the race, Blue Max Racing driver Rusty Wallace would manage to fend off against second-place driver, Melling Racing driver Bill Elliott, to take his sixth career NASCAR Winston Cup Series victory and his second victory of the season. To fill out the top three, the aforementioned Bill Elliott and Junior Johnson & Associates driver Terry Labonte would finish second and third, respectively.

== Background ==
The layout of Michigan International Speedway, the venue where the race was held.

The race was held at Michigan International Speedway, a two-mile (3.2 km) moderate-banked D-shaped speedway located in Brooklyn, Michigan. The track is used primarily for NASCAR events. It is known as a "sister track" to Texas World Speedway as MIS's oval design was a direct basis of TWS, with moderate modifications to the banking in the corners, and was used as the basis of Auto Club Speedway. The track is owned by International Speedway Corporation. Michigan International Speedway is recognized as one of motorsports' premier facilities because of its wide racing surface and high banking (by open-wheel standards; the 18-degree banking is modest by stock car standards).

=== Entry list ===
- (R) denotes rookie driver.

#	Driver	Team	Make	Sponsor
1	Dale Jarrett	Ellington Racing	Buick	Port-A-Lube, Bud Light
2	Ernie Irvan (R)	U.S. Racing	Chevrolet	Kroger
3	Dale Earnhardt	Richard Childress Racing	Chevrolet	GM Goodwrench Service
4	Rick Wilson	Morgan–McClure Motorsports	Oldsmobile	Kodak
5	Geoff Bodine	Hendrick Motorsports	Chevrolet	Levi Garrett
6	Mark Martin	Roush Racing	Ford	Stroh Light
7	Alan Kulwicki	AK Racing	Ford	Zerex
8	Bobby Hillin Jr.	Stavola Brothers Racing	Buick	Miller High Life
9	Bill Elliott	Melling Racing	Ford	Coors Light
10	Ken Bouchard (R)	Whitcomb Racing	Ford	Whitcomb Racing
11	Terry Labonte	Junior Johnson & Associates	Chevrolet	Budweiser
12	Bobby Allison	Stavola Brothers Racing	Buick	Miller High Life
15	Brett Bodine	Bud Moore Engineering	Ford	Crisco
17	Darrell Waltrip	Hendrick Motorsports	Chevrolet	Tide
21	Kyle Petty	Wood Brothers Racing	Ford	Citgo
23	Eddie Bierschwale	B&B Racing	Oldsmobile	Wayne Paging
25	Ken Schrader	Hendrick Motorsports	Chevrolet	Folgers
26	Ricky Rudd	King Racing	Buick	Quaker State
27	Rusty Wallace	Blue Max Racing	Pontiac	Kodiak
28	Davey Allison	Ranier-Lundy Racing	Ford	Havoline
29	Cale Yarborough	Cale Yarborough Motorsports	Oldsmobile	Hardee's
30	Michael Waltrip	Bahari Racing	Pontiac	Country Time
31	Joe Ruttman	Bob Clark Motorsports	Oldsmobile	Slender You Figure Salons
33	Morgan Shepherd	Mach 1 Racing	Chevrolet	Skoal Bandit
36	H. B. Bailey	Bailey Racing	Pontiac	Almeda Auto Parts
43	Richard Petty	Petty Enterprises	Pontiac	STP
44	Sterling Marlin	Hagan Racing	Oldsmobile	Piedmont Airlines
51	David Simko	Simko Racing	Pontiac	Tom Company
52	Jimmy Means	Jimmy Means Racing	Pontiac	Eureka
55	Phil Parsons	Jackson Bros. Motorsports	Oldsmobile	Crown, Skoal Classic
67	Buddy Arrington	Arrington Racing	Ford	Pannill Sweatshirts
68	Derrike Cope	Testa Racing	Ford	Purolator Filters
70	J. D. McDuffie	McDuffie Racing	Pontiac	Rumple Furniture
71	Dave Marcis	Marcis Auto Racing	Chevrolet	Lifebuoy
75	Neil Bonnett	RahMoc Enterprises	Pontiac	Valvoline
78	Jay Sommers	Sommers Racing	Chevrolet	Doe & Associates
80	Jimmy Horton (R)	S&H Racing	Ford	S&H Racing
83	Lake Speed	Speed Racing	Oldsmobile	Wynn's, Kmart
88	Buddy Baker	Baker-Schiff Racing	Oldsmobile	Red Baron Frozen Pizza
90	Benny Parsons	Donlavey Racing	Ford	Bull's-Eye Barbecue Sauce
92	David Sosebee	LC Racing	Ford	LC Racing
96	Dana Patten	Patten Racing	Buick	U.S. Chrome
97	Rodney Combs	Winkle Motorsports	Buick	AC Spark Plug
98	Brad Noffsinger (R)	Curb Racing	Buick	Sunoco
99	Connie Saylor	Ball Motorsports	Chevrolet	Ball Motorsports

== Qualifying ==
Qualifying was split into two rounds. The first round was held on Saturday, June 24, at 11:30 AM EST. Each driver would have one lap to set a time. During the first round, the top 20 drivers in the round would be guaranteed a starting spot in the race. If a driver was not able to guarantee a spot in the first round, they had the option to scrub their time from the first round and try and run a faster lap time in a second round qualifying run, held on Saturday, June 24, at 2:00 PM EST. As with the first round, each driver would have one lap to set a time. For this specific race, positions 21-40 would be decided on time, and depending on who needed it, a select amount of positions were given to cars who had not otherwise qualified but were high enough in owner's points; up to two were given.

Bill Elliott, driving for Melling Racing, would win the pole, setting a time of 41.694 and an average speed of 172.687 miles per hour (277.913 km/h) in the first round.

Four drivers would fail to qualify.

=== Full qualifying results ===
Pos.	#	Driver	Team	Make	Time	Speed
1	9	Bill Elliott	Melling Racing	Ford	41.694	172.687
2	5	Geoff Bodine	Hendrick Motorsports	Chevrolet	41.744	172.480
3	28	Davey Allison	Ranier-Lundy Racing	Ford	41.825	172.146
4	17	Darrell Waltrip	Hendrick Motorsports	Chevrolet	41.917	171.768
5	27	Rusty Wallace	Blue Max Racing	Pontiac	41.953	171.621
6	7	Alan Kulwicki	AK Racing	Ford	42.040	171.265
7	23	Eddie Bierschwale	B&B Racing	Oldsmobile	42.190	170.657
8	90	Benny Parsons	Donlavey Racing	Ford	42.203	170.604
9	3	Dale Earnhardt	Richard Childress Racing	Chevrolet	42.211	170.572
10	8	Bobby Hillin Jr.	Stavola Brothers Racing	Buick	42.283	170.281
11	25	Ken Schrader	Hendrick Motorsports	Chevrolet	42.284	170.277
12	12	Mike Alexander	Stavola Brothers Racing	Buick	42.344	170.036
13	6	Mark Martin	Roush Racing	Ford	42.348	170.020
14	97	Rodney Combs	Winkle Motorsports	Buick	42.375	169.912
15	44	Sterling Marlin	Hagan Racing	Oldsmobile	42.387	169.863
16	15	Brett Bodine	Bud Moore Engineering	Ford	42.397	169.823
17	21	Kyle Petty	Wood Brothers Racing	Ford	42.398	169.819
18	11	Terry Labonte	Junior Johnson & Associates	Chevrolet	42.409	169.775
19	4	Rick Wilson	Morgan–McClure Motorsports	Oldsmobile	42.465	169.551
20	75	Neil Bonnett	RahMoc Enterprises	Pontiac	42.478	169.500
Failed to lock in Round 1
21	88	Buddy Baker	Baker–Schiff Racing	Oldsmobile	42.500	169.412
22	83	Lake Speed	Speed Racing	Oldsmobile	42.543	169.241
23	33	Morgan Shepherd	Mach 1 Racing	Chevrolet	42.569	169.137
24	43	Richard Petty	Petty Enterprises	Pontiac	42.597	169.026
25	68	Derrike Cope	Testa Racing	Ford	42.598	169.022
26	31	Joe Ruttman	Bob Clark Motorsports	Oldsmobile	42.615	168.955
27	92	David Sosebee	LC Racing	Ford	42.625	168.915
28	29	Cale Yarborough	Cale Yarborough Motorsports	Oldsmobile	42.711	168.575
29	2	Ernie Irvan (R)	U.S. Racing	Chevrolet	42.733	168.488
30	67	Buddy Arrington	Arrington Racing	Ford	42.733	168.488
31	26	Ricky Rudd	King Racing	Buick	42.797	168.236
32	10	Ken Bouchard (R)	Whitcomb Racing	Ford	42.851	168.024
33	1	Dale Jarrett	Ellington Racing	Buick	42.869	167.954
34	30	Michael Waltrip	Bahari Racing	Pontiac	42.885	167.891
35	55	Phil Parsons	Jackson Bros. Motorsports	Oldsmobile	42.946	167.652
36	36	H. B. Bailey	Bailey Racing	Pontiac	42.978	167.528
37	96	Dana Patten	Patten Racing	Buick	42.999	167.446
38	51	David Simko	Simko Racing	Pontiac	43.018	167.372
39	71	Dave Marcis	Marcis Auto Racing	Chevrolet	43.030	167.325
40	52	Jimmy Means	Jimmy Means Racing	Pontiac	43.125	166.957
Provisional
41	98	Brad Noffsinger (R)	Curb Racing	Buick	43.158	166.829
Failed to qualify
42	80	Jimmy Horton (R)	S&H Racing	Ford	43.280	166.359
43	78	Jay Sommers	Sommers Racing	Chevrolet	43.647	164.960
44	70	J. D. McDuffie	McDuffie Racing	Pontiac	44.222	162.815
45	99	Connie Saylor	Ball Motorsports	Chevrolet	-	-
Official starting lineup

== Race results ==
Fin	St	#	Driver	Team	Make	Laps	Led	Status	Pts	Winnings
1	5	27	Rusty Wallace	Blue Max Racing	Pontiac	200	106	running	185	$64,100
2	1	9	Bill Elliott	Melling Racing	Ford	200	24	running	175	$42,875
3	18	11	Terry Labonte	Junior Johnson & Associates	Chevrolet	200	29	running	170	$28,075
4	9	3	Dale Earnhardt	Richard Childress Racing	Chevrolet	200	12	running	165	$26,175
5	2	5	Geoff Bodine	Hendrick Motorsports	Chevrolet	200	0	running	155	$20,325
6	11	25	Ken Schrader	Hendrick Motorsports	Chevrolet	200	3	running	155	$16,000
7	35	55	Phil Parsons	Jackson Bros. Motorsports	Oldsmobile	200	0	running	146	$14,150
8	4	17	Darrell Waltrip	Hendrick Motorsports	Chevrolet	199	1	running	147	$15,450
9	28	29	Cale Yarborough	Cale Yarborough Motorsports	Oldsmobile	199	1	running	143	$9,700
10	12	12	Mike Alexander	Stavola Brothers Racing	Buick	199	0	running	134	$15,950
11	31	26	Ricky Rudd	King Racing	Buick	199	0	running	130	$10,425
12	10	8	Bobby Hillin Jr.	Stavola Brothers Racing	Buick	199	0	running	127	$9,950
13	21	88	Buddy Baker	Baker–Schiff Racing	Oldsmobile	198	1	running	129	$9,500
14	13	6	Mark Martin	Roush Racing	Ford	198	0	running	121	$7,050
15	29	2	Ernie Irvan (R)	U.S. Racing	Chevrolet	198	0	running	118	$6,250
16	26	31	Joe Ruttman	Bob Clark Motorsports	Oldsmobile	198	0	running	115	$6,250
17	32	10	Ken Bouchard (R)	Whitcomb Racing	Ford	197	0	running	112	$4,675
18	39	71	Dave Marcis	Marcis Auto Racing	Chevrolet	197	0	running	109	$7,500
19	20	75	Neil Bonnett	RahMoc Enterprises	Pontiac	197	0	running	106	$10,985
20	41	98	Brad Noffsinger (R)	Curb Racing	Buick	196	0	running	103	$4,420
21	6	7	Alan Kulwicki	AK Racing	Ford	195	0	running	100	$6,725
22	37	96	Dana Patten	Patten Racing	Buick	194	0	running	97	$3,510
23	30	67	Buddy Arrington	Arrington Racing	Ford	188	0	running	94	$5,375
24	24	43	Richard Petty	Petty Enterprises	Pontiac	186	0	running	91	$6,265
25	33	1	Dale Jarrett	Ellington Racing	Buick	183	0	running	88	$3,255
26	7	23	Eddie Bierschwale	B&B Racing	Oldsmobile	174	0	cylinder	85	$3,070
27	16	15	Brett Bodine	Bud Moore Engineering	Ford	165	0	engine	82	$11,610
28	34	30	Michael Waltrip	Bahari Racing	Pontiac	158	0	engine	79	$5,900
29	22	83	Lake Speed	Speed Racing	Oldsmobile	128	0	crank	76	$3,715
30	14	97	Rodney Combs	Winkle Motorsports	Buick	126	0	engine	73	$2,805
31	27	92	David Sosebee	LC Racing	Ford	124	0	ignition	0	$2,750
32	25	68	Derrike Cope	Testa Racing	Ford	121	0	clutch	67	$5,410
33	17	21	Kyle Petty	Wood Brothers Racing	Ford	105	0	engine	64	$9,650
34	23	33	Morgan Shepherd	Mach 1 Racing	Chevrolet	83	0	engine	61	$5,275
35	3	28	Davey Allison	Ranier-Lundy Racing	Ford	70	23	engine	63	$12,440
36	40	52	Jimmy Means	Jimmy Means Racing	Pontiac	51	0	engine	55	$5,185
37	15	44	Sterling Marlin	Hagan Racing	Oldsmobile	41	0	engine	52	$5,150
38	8	90	Benny Parsons	Donlavey Racing	Ford	22	0	oil pump	49	$5,110
39	36	36	H. B. Bailey	Bailey Racing	Pontiac	21	0	oil leak	46	$2,470
40	38	51	David Simko	Simko Racing	Pontiac	9	0	engine	0	$2,450
41	19	4	Rick Wilson	Morgan–McClure Motorsports	Oldsmobile	2	0	engine	40	$3,050
Failed to qualify
42		80	Jimmy Horton (R)	S&H Racing	Ford					
43		78	Jay Sommers	Sommers Racing	Chevrolet					
44		70	J. D. McDuffie	McDuffie Racing	Pontiac					
45		99	Connie Saylor	Ball Motorsports	Chevrolet					
Official race results

== Standings after the race ==
Drivers' Championship standings

	Pos	Driver	Points
	1	Rusty Wallace	2,145
	2	Dale Earnhardt	2,015 (-130)
	3	Bill Elliott	1,995 (-150)
	4	Terry Labonte	1,939 (–206)
1	5	Ken Schrader	1,829 (–316)
1	6	Geoff Bodine	1,814 (–331)
2	7	Sterling Marlin	1,808 (–337)
1	8	Phil Parsons	1,762 (–383)
2	9	Darrell Waltrip	1,734 (–411)
	10	Bobby Hillin Jr.	1,723 (–422)
Official driver's standings

- Note: Only the first 10 positions are included for the driver standings.

Previous race: 1988 Miller High Life 500	NASCAR Winston Cup Series; 1988 season	Next race: 1988 Pepsi Firecracker 400
