= 1989 Goody's 500 =

24th race of the 1989 NASCAR Winston Cup Series

Race details
- Race 24 of 29 in the 1989 NASCAR Winston Cup Series
- The 1989 Goody's 500 program cover.
- Date: September 24, 1989
- Official name: 41st Annual Goody's 500
- Location: Ridgeway, Virginia, Martinsville Speedway
- Course: Permanent racing facility
- Course length: 0.526 miles (0.847 km)
- Distance: 500 laps, 263 mi (423.257 km)
- Scheduled distance: 500 laps, 263 mi (423.257 km)
- Average speed: 76.571 miles per hour (123.229 km/h)

Pole position
Driver	Jimmy Hensley	Richard Childress Racing
- Time: 20.602

Most laps led
Driver	Rusty Wallace	Blue Max Racing
- Laps: 198

Winner
No. 17	Darrell Waltrip	Hendrick Motorsports

Television in the United States
- Network: ESPN
- Announcers: Bob Jenkins, Ned Jarrett, Benny Parsons

Radio in the United States
- Radio: Motor Racing Network

The 1989 Goody's 500 was the 24th stock car race of the 1989 NASCAR Winston Cup Series season and the 41st iteration of the event. The race was held on Sunday, September 24, 1989, in Martinsville, Virginia at Martinsville Speedway, a 0.526 miles (0.847 km) permanent oval-shaped short track. The race took the scheduled 500 laps to complete. In the closing stages of the race, Hendrick Motorsports driver Darrell Waltrip would make a late-race charge to the front, passing for the lead with 47 laps left in the race. Afterwards, Jackson Bros. Motorsports driver Harry Gant would make an attempted charge before a caution came out with two laps left in the race, ending the race and handing Waltrip the victory. The victory was Waltrip's 79th career NASCAR Winston Cup Series victory and his sixth and final victory of the season. To fill out the top three, the aforementioned Harry Gant and Stavola Brothers Racing driver Dick Trickle would finish second and third, respectively.

== Background ==
The layout of Martinsville Speedway, the venue where the race was held.

Martinsville Speedway is a NASCAR-owned stock car racing track located in Henry County, in Ridgeway, Virginia, just to the south of Martinsville. At 0.526 miles (0.847 km) in length, it is the shortest track in the NASCAR Cup Series. The track was also one of the first paved oval tracks in NASCAR, being built in 1947 by H. Clay Earles. It is also the only remaining race track that has been on the NASCAR circuit from its beginning in 1948.

=== Entry list ===
- (R) denotes rookie driver.

#	Driver	Team	Make	Sponsor
2	Ernie Irvan	U.S. Racing	Pontiac	Kroger
3	Dale Earnhardt	Richard Childress Racing	Chevrolet	GM Goodwrench Service Plus
4	Rick Wilson	Morgan–McClure Motorsports	Oldsmobile	Kodak
5	Geoff Bodine	Hendrick Motorsports	Chevrolet	Levi Garrett
6	Mark Martin	Roush Racing	Ford	Stroh's Light
7	Alan Kulwicki	AK Racing	Ford	Zerex
8	Bobby Hillin Jr.	Stavola Brothers Racing	Buick	Miller High Life
9	Bill Elliott	Melling Racing	Ford	Coors Light
10	Derrike Cope	Whitcomb Racing	Pontiac	Purolator
11	Terry Labonte	Junior Johnson & Associates	Ford	Budweiser
15	Brett Bodine	Bud Moore Engineering	Ford	Motorcraft
16	Larry Pearson (R)	Pearson Racing	Buick	Chattanooga Chew
17	Darrell Waltrip	Hendrick Motorsports	Chevrolet	Tide
21	Tommy Ellis	Wood Brothers Racing	Ford	Citgo
25	Ken Schrader	Hendrick Motorsports	Chevrolet	Folgers
26	Ricky Rudd	King Racing	Buick	Quaker State
27	Rusty Wallace	Blue Max Racing	Pontiac	Kodiak
28	Davey Allison	Robert Yates Racing	Ford	Texaco, Havoline
29	Dale Jarrett	Cale Yarborough Motorsports	Pontiac	Hardee's
30	Michael Waltrip	Bahari Racing	Pontiac	Country Time
33	Harry Gant	Jackson Bros. Motorsports	Oldsmobile	Skoal Bandit
42	Kyle Petty	SABCO Racing	Pontiac	Peak Antifreeze
43	Richard Petty	Petty Enterprises	Pontiac	STP
48	Greg Sacks	Winkle Motorsports	Pontiac	Dinner Bell Foods
51	Butch Miller (R)	Miller Racing	Chevrolet	Miller Racing
52	Jimmy Means	Jimmy Means Racing	Pontiac	Alka-Seltzer
55	Phil Parsons	Jackson Bros. Motorsports	Oldsmobile	Skoal, Crown Central Petroleum
57	Hut Stricklin (R)	Osterlund Racing	Pontiac	Heinz
70	J. D. McDuffie	McDuffie Racing	Pontiac	Rumple Furniture
71	Dave Marcis	Marcis Auto Racing	Chevrolet	Lifebuoy
75	Morgan Shepherd	RahMoc Enterprises	Pontiac	Valvoline
83	Lake Speed	Speed Racing	Oldsmobile	Bull's-Eye Barbecue Sauce
84	Dick Trickle (R)	Stavola Brothers Racing	Buick	Miller High Life
88	Jimmy Spencer (R)	Baker–Schiff Racing	Pontiac	Crisco
94	Sterling Marlin	Hagan Racing	Oldsmobile	Sunoco

== Qualifying ==
Qualifying was split into two rounds. The first round was held on Friday, September 22, at 3:00 PM EST. Each driver would have one lap to set a time. During the first round, the top 20 drivers in the round would be guaranteed a starting spot in the race. If a driver was not able to guarantee a spot in the first round, they had the option to scrub their time from the first round and try and run a faster lap time in a second round qualifying run, held on Saturday, September 23, at 12:30 PM EST. As with the first round, each driver would have one lap to set a time. For this specific race, positions 21-30 would be decided on time, and depending on who needed it, a select amount of positions were given to cars who had not otherwise qualified but were high enough in owner's points; up to two were given.

Jimmy Hensley, who was replacing the regular driver for Richard Childress Racing, Dale Earnhardt, would win the pole, setting a time of 20.602 and an average speed of 91.913 miles per hour (147.920 km/h) in the first round.

Three drivers would fail to qualify.

=== Full qualifying results ===
Pos.	#	Driver	Team	Make	Time	Speed
1	3	Jimmy Hensley (Note: Jimmy Hensley would replace Dale Earnhardt in first-round qualifying due to traveling difficulties Earnhardt had experienced due to Hurricane Hugo.)	Richard Childress Racing	Chevrolet	20.602	91.913
2	17	Darrell Waltrip	Hendrick Motorsports	Chevrolet	20.620	91.833
3	5	Geoff Bodine	Hendrick Motorsports	Chevrolet	20.648	91.709
4	94	Sterling Marlin	Hagan Racing	Oldsmobile	20.738	91.311
5	84	Dick Trickle (R)	Stavola Brothers Racing	Buick	20.799	91.043
6	11	Terry Labonte	Junior Johnson & Associates	Ford	20.803	91.025
7	26	Ricky Rudd	King Racing	Buick	20.839	90.868
8	7	Alan Kulwicki	AK Racing	Ford	20.851	90.816
9	6	Mark Martin	Roush Racing	Ford	20.855	90.798
10	9	Bill Elliott	Melling Racing	Ford	20.858	90.785
11	42	Kyle Petty	SABCO Racing	Pontiac	20.872	90.724
12	16	Larry Pearson (R)	Pearson Racing	Buick	20.877	90.703
13	2	Ernie Irvan	U.S. Racing	Pontiac	20.892	90.638
14	75	Morgan Shepherd	RahMoc Enterprises	Pontiac	20.914	90.542
15	30	Michael Waltrip	Bahari Racing	Pontiac	20.935	90.451
16	15	Brett Bodine	Bud Moore Engineering	Ford	20.960	90.344
17	28	Davey Allison	Robert Yates Racing	Ford	20.977	90.270
18	52	Jimmy Means	Jimmy Means Racing	Pontiac	20.989	90.219
19	10	Derrike Cope	Whitcomb Racing	Pontiac	20.990	90.214
20	27	Rusty Wallace	Blue Max Racing	Pontiac	21.004	90.154
Failed to lock in Round 1
21	25	Ken Schrader (Note: Tommy Houston would replace Ken Schrader in first-round qualifying due to traveling difficulties Schrader had experienced due to Hurricane Hugo.)	Hendrick Motorsports	Chevrolet	20.855	90.798
22	4	Rick Wilson (Note: Brad Teague would replace Rick Wilson in first-round qualifying due to traveling difficulties Wilson had experienced due to Hurricane Hugo.)	Morgan–McClure Motorsports	Oldsmobile	21.017	90.098
23	48	Greg Sacks	Winkle Motorsports	Pontiac	21.038	90.009
24	33	Harry Gant	Jackson Bros. Motorsports	Oldsmobile	21.060	89.915
25	29	Dale Jarrett	Cale Yarborough Motorsports	Pontiac	21.067	89.885
26	21	Tommy Ellis	Wood Brothers Racing	Ford	21.074	89.855
27	8	Bobby Hillin Jr.	Stavola Brothers Racing	Buick	21.087	89.799
28	57	Hut Stricklin (R)	Osterlund Racing	Pontiac	21.176	89.422
29	51	Butch Miller (R)	Miller Racing	Chevrolet	21.189	89.367
30	43	Richard Petty	Petty Enterprises	Pontiac	21.237	89.165
Provisionals
31	83	Lake Speed	Speed Racing	Oldsmobile	21.247	89.123
32	55	Phil Parsons	Jackson Bros. Motorsports	Oldsmobile	21.367	88.623
Failed to qualify
33	88	Jimmy Spencer (R)	Baker–Schiff Racing	Pontiac	-*	-*
34	71	Dave Marcis	Marcis Auto Racing	Chevrolet	-*	-*
35	70	J. D. McDuffie	McDuffie Racing	Pontiac	-*	-*
Official first round qualifying results
Official starting lineup

== Race results ==
Fin	St	#	Driver	Team	Make	Laps	Led	Status	Pts	Winnings
1	2	17	Darrell Waltrip	Hendrick Motorsports	Chevrolet	500	118	running	180	$55,650
2	24	33	Harry Gant	Jackson Bros. Motorsports	Oldsmobile	500	0	running	170	$33,802
3	5	84	Dick Trickle (R)	Stavola Brothers Racing	Buick	500	1	running	170	$22,250
4	20	27	Rusty Wallace	Blue Max Racing	Pontiac	500	198	running	170	$18,875
5	25	29	Dale Jarrett	Cale Yarborough Motorsports	Pontiac	500	96	running	160	$15,125
6	13	2	Ernie Irvan	U.S. Racing	Pontiac	500	6	running	155	$7,275
7	16	15	Brett Bodine	Bud Moore Engineering	Ford	500	0	running	146	$7,700
8	7	26	Ricky Rudd	King Racing	Buick	499	0	running	142	$10,900
9	1	3	Dale Earnhardt	Richard Childress Racing	Chevrolet	499	74	running	143	$15,950
10	21	25	Ken Schrader	Hendrick Motorsports	Chevrolet	497	0	running	134	$11,700
11	6	11	Terry Labonte	Junior Johnson & Associates	Ford	496	0	running	130	$9,220
12	15	30	Michael Waltrip	Bahari Racing	Pontiac	495	0	running	127	$6,070
13	19	10	Derrike Cope	Whitcomb Racing	Pontiac	495	0	running	124	$4,120
14	32	55	Phil Parsons	Jackson Bros. Motorsports	Oldsmobile	494	0	running	121	$5,220
15	10	9	Bill Elliott	Melling Racing	Ford	494	0	running	118	$12,620
16	3	5	Geoff Bodine	Hendrick Motorsports	Chevrolet	493	0	running	115	$9,800
17	28	57	Hut Stricklin (R)	Osterlund Racing	Pontiac	490	0	running	112	$3,580
18	22	4	Rick Wilson	Morgan–McClure Motorsports	Oldsmobile	489	0	running	109	$4,705
19	23	48	Greg Sacks	Winkle Motorsports	Pontiac	486	0	running	106	$1,975
20	4	94	Sterling Marlin	Hagan Racing	Oldsmobile	438	0	running	103	$6,675
21	17	28	Davey Allison	Robert Yates Racing	Ford	429	0	running	100	$9,250
22	31	83	Lake Speed	Speed Racing	Oldsmobile	380	0	engine	97	$4,155
23	9	6	Mark Martin	Roush Racing	Ford	368	0	engine	94	$4,570
24	30	43	Richard Petty	Petty Enterprises	Pontiac	357	0	crash	91	$3,220
25	12	16	Larry Pearson (R)	Pearson Racing	Buick	356	0	running	88	$2,850
26	8	7	Alan Kulwicki	AK Racing	Ford	316	7	crash	90	$4,450
27	27	8	Bobby Hillin Jr.	Stavola Brothers Racing	Buick	306	0	overheating	82	$3,775
28	14	75	Morgan Shepherd	RahMoc Enterprises	Pontiac	288	0	rear end	79	$8,950
29	26	21	Tommy Ellis	Wood Brothers Racing	Ford	271	0	engine	0	$3,125
30	11	42	Kyle Petty	SABCO Racing	Pontiac	248	0	engine	73	$1,960
31	18	52	Jimmy Means	Jimmy Means Racing	Pontiac	80	0	engine	70	$1,810
32	29	51	Butch Miller (R)	Miller Racing	Chevrolet	44	0	rear end	67	$1,610
Failed to qualify
33		88	Jimmy Spencer (R)	Baker–Schiff Racing	Pontiac					
34		71	Dave Marcis	Marcis Auto Racing	Chevrolet					
35		70	J. D. McDuffie	McDuffie Racing	Pontiac					
Official race results

== Standings after the race ==
Drivers' Championship standings

	Pos	Driver	Points
	1	Dale Earnhardt	3,540
	2	Rusty Wallace	3,465 (-75)
	3	Mark Martin	3,285 (-255)
	4	Darrell Waltrip	3,252 (–288)
1	5	Ricky Rudd	3,079 (–461)
1	6	Bill Elliott	3,074 (–466)
	7	Ken Schrader	3,028 (–512)
	8	Davey Allison	2,992 (–548)
2	9	Harry Gant	2,940 (–600)
	10	Terry Labonte	2,935 (–605)
Official driver's standings

- Note: Only the first 10 positions are included for the driver standings.

== Notes ==
Previous race: 1989 Peak Performance 500	NASCAR Winston Cup Series; 1989 season	Next race: 1989 All Pro Auto Parts 500
