= 1989 Miller High Life 400 (Richmond) =

22nd race of the 1989 NASCAR Winston Cup Series

Race details
- Race 22 of 29 in the 1989 NASCAR Winston Cup Series
- The 1989 Miller Genuine Draft 400 program cover, featuring Bobby Allison. Artwork by NASCAR artist Sam Bass.
- Date: September 10, 1989
- Official name: 32nd Annual Miller High Life 400
- Location: Richmond, Virginia, Richmond International Raceway
- Course: Permanent racing facility
- Course length: 0.75 miles (1.21 km)
- Distance: 400 laps, 300 mi (482.803 km)
- Scheduled distance: 400 laps, 300 mi (482.803 km)
- Average speed: 88.38 miles per hour (142.23 km/h)
- Attendance: 60,000

Pole position
Driver	Bill Elliott	Melling Racing
- Time: 22.289

Most laps led
Driver	Rusty Wallace	Blue Max Racing
- Laps: 211

Winner
No. 27	Rusty Wallace	Blue Max Racing

Television in the United States
- Network: TBS
- Announcers: Ken Squier, Johnny Hayes, Chris Economaki

Radio in the United States
- Radio: Motor Racing Network

The 1989 Miller High Life 400 was the 22nd stock car race of the 1989 NASCAR Winston Cup Series season and the 32nd iteration of the event. The race was held on Sunday, September 10, 1989, before an audience of 60,000 in Richmond, Virginia, at Richmond International Raceway, a 0.75 miles (1.21 km) D-shaped oval. The race took the scheduled 400 laps to complete. Gambling on fuel strategy, Blue Max Racing driver Rusty Wallace would manage to run the last 129 laps of the race on one tank of fuel to take his 16th career NASCAR Winston Cup Series victory and his sixth and final victory of the season. To fill out the top three, Richard Childress Racing driver Dale Earnhardt and Hendrick Motorsports driver Geoff Bodine would finish second and third, respectively.

== Background ==
The layout of Richmond International Raceway, the venue where the race was at.

Richmond International Raceway (RIR) is a 3/4-mile (1.2 km), D-shaped, asphalt race track located just outside Richmond, Virginia in Henrico County. It hosts the Monster Energy NASCAR Cup Series and Xfinity Series. Known as "America's premier short track", it formerly hosted a NASCAR Camping World Truck Series race, an IndyCar Series race, and two USAC sprint car races.

=== Entry list ===
- (R) denotes rookie driver.

#	Driver	Team	Make	Sponsor
2	Ernie Irvan	U.S. Racing	Pontiac	Kroger
3	Dale Earnhardt	Richard Childress Racing	Chevrolet	GM Goodwrench Service Plus
4	Rick Wilson	Morgan–McClure Motorsports	Oldsmobile	Kodak
5	Geoff Bodine	Hendrick Motorsports	Chevrolet	Levi Garrett
6	Mark Martin	Roush Racing	Ford	Stroh's Light
7	Alan Kulwicki	AK Racing	Ford	Zerex
8	Bobby Hillin Jr.	Stavola Brothers Racing	Buick	Miller High Life
9	Bill Elliott	Melling Racing	Ford	Coors Light
10	Derrike Cope	Whitcomb Racing	Pontiac	Purolator
11	Terry Labonte	Junior Johnson & Associates	Ford	Budweiser
15	Brett Bodine	Bud Moore Engineering	Ford	Motorcraft
16	Larry Pearson (R)	Pearson Racing	Buick	Chattanooga Chew
17	Darrell Waltrip	Hendrick Motorsports	Chevrolet	Tide
21	Neil Bonnett	Wood Brothers Racing	Ford	Citgo
25	Ken Schrader	Hendrick Motorsports	Chevrolet	Folgers
26	Ricky Rudd	King Racing	Buick	Quaker State
27	Rusty Wallace	Blue Max Racing	Pontiac	Kodiak
28	Davey Allison	Robert Yates Racing	Ford	Texaco, Havoline
29	Dale Jarrett	Cale Yarborough Motorsports	Pontiac	Hardee's
30	Michael Waltrip	Bahari Racing	Pontiac	Country Time
33	Harry Gant	Jackson Bros. Motorsports	Oldsmobile	Skoal Bandit
40	Darin Brassfield	Brassfield Racing	Chevrolet	Dale Earnhardt Chevrolet
42	Kyle Petty	SABCO Racing	Pontiac	Peak Antifreeze
43	Richard Petty	Petty Enterprises	Pontiac	STP
48	Greg Sacks	Winkle Motorsports	Pontiac	Dinner Bell Foods
51	Butch Miller (R)	Miller Racing	Chevrolet	Miller Racing
52	Jimmy Means	Jimmy Means Racing	Pontiac	Alka-Seltzer
55	Phil Parsons	Jackson Bros. Motorsports	Oldsmobile	Skoal, Crown Central Petroleum
57	Hut Stricklin (R)	Osterlund Racing	Pontiac	Heinz
70	J. D. McDuffie	McDuffie Racing	Pontiac	Rumple Furniture
71	Dave Marcis	Marcis Auto Racing	Chevrolet	Lifebuoy
75	Morgan Shepherd	RahMoc Enterprises	Pontiac	Valvoline
83	Lake Speed	Speed Racing	Oldsmobile	Bull's-Eye Barbecue Sauce
84	Dick Trickle (R)	Stavola Brothers Racing	Buick	Miller High Life
88	Jimmy Spencer (R)	Baker–Schiff Racing	Pontiac	Crisco
90	Lennie Pond	Donlavey Racing	Ford	V8
94	Sterling Marlin	Hagan Racing	Oldsmobile	Sunoco

== Qualifying ==
Qualifying was split into two rounds. The first round was held on Thursday, September 8, at 3:00 PM EST. Each driver would have one lap to set a time. During the first round, the top 20 drivers in the round would be guaranteed a starting spot in the race. If a driver was not able to guarantee a spot in the first round, they had the option to scrub their time from the first round and try and run a faster lap time in a second round qualifying run, held on Friday, September 9, at 11:00 AM EST. As with the first round, each driver would have one lap to set a time. For this specific race, positions 21-34 would be decided on time, and depending on who needed it, a select amount of positions were given to cars who had not otherwise qualified but were high enough in owner's points; up to two were given.

Bill Elliott, driving for Melling Racing, would win the pole, setting a time of 22.289 and an average speed of 121.136 miles per hour (194.949 km/h) in the first round.

Greg Sacks was the only driver to fail to qualify.

=== Full qualifying results ===
Pos.	#	Driver	Team	Make	Time	Speed
1	9	Bill Elliott	Melling Racing	Ford	22.289	121.136
2	51	Butch Miller (R)	Miller Racing	Chevrolet	22.293	121.114
3	25	Ken Schrader	Hendrick Motorsports	Chevrolet	22.332	120.903
4	11	Terry Labonte	Junior Johnson & Associates	Ford	22.462	120.203
5	28	Davey Allison	Robert Yates Racing	Ford	22.474	120.139
6	27	Rusty Wallace	Blue Max Racing	Pontiac	22.478	120.117
7	26	Ricky Rudd	King Racing	Buick	22.478	120.117
8	3	Dale Earnhardt	Richard Childress Racing	Chevrolet	22.516	119.915
9	30	Michael Waltrip	Bahari Racing	Pontiac	22.518	119.904
10	6	Mark Martin	Roush Racing	Ford	22.544	119.766
11	94	Sterling Marlin	Hagan Racing	Oldsmobile	22.659	119.158
12	17	Darrell Waltrip	Hendrick Motorsports	Chevrolet	22.690	118.995
13	4	Rick Wilson	Morgan–McClure Motorsports	Oldsmobile	22.703	118.927
14	7	Alan Kulwicki	AK Racing	Ford	22.719	118.843
15	10	Derrike Cope	Whitcomb Racing	Pontiac	22.736	118.754
16	16	Larry Pearson (R)	Pearson Racing	Buick	22.740	118.734
17	2	Ernie Irvan	U.S. Racing	Pontiac	22.740	118.734
18	33	Harry Gant	Jackson Bros. Motorsports	Oldsmobile	22.777	118.541
19	5	Geoff Bodine	Hendrick Motorsports	Chevrolet	22.806	118.390
20	42	Kyle Petty	SABCO Racing	Pontiac	22.858	118.121
Failed to lock in Round 1
21	84	Dick Trickle (R)	Stavola Brothers Racing	Buick	22.485	120.080
22	57	Hut Stricklin (R)	Osterlund Racing	Pontiac	22.734	118.765
23	83	Lake Speed	Speed Racing	Oldsmobile	22.827	118.281
24	21	Neil Bonnett	Wood Brothers Racing	Ford	22.866	118.079
25	90	Lennie Pond	Donlavey Racing	Ford	22.875	118.033
26	29	Dale Jarrett	Cale Yarborough Motorsports	Pontiac	22.891	117.950
27	88	Jimmy Spencer (R)	Baker–Schiff Racing	Pontiac	22.913	117.837
28	55	Phil Parsons	Jackson Bros. Motorsports	Oldsmobile	22.931	117.745
29	52	Jimmy Means	Jimmy Means Racing	Pontiac	22.975	117.519
30	71	Dave Marcis	Marcis Auto Racing	Chevrolet	22.981	117.488
31	8	Bobby Hillin Jr.	Stavola Brothers Racing	Buick	23.026	117.259
32	70	J. D. McDuffie	McDuffie Racing	Pontiac	23.050	117.137
33	15	Brett Bodine	Bud Moore Engineering	Ford	23.062	117.076
34	75	Morgan Shepherd	RahMoc Enterprises	Pontiac	23.084	116.964
35	43	Richard Petty	Petty Enterprises	Pontiac	23.148	116.641
36	40	Darin Brassfield	Brassfield Racing	Chevrolet	23.299	115.885
Failed to qualify
37	48	Greg Sacks	Winkle Motorsports	Pontiac	-*	-*
Official first round qualifying results
Official starting lineup

== Race results ==
Fin	St	#	Driver	Team	Make	Laps	Led	Status	Pts	Winnings
1	6	27	Rusty Wallace	Blue Max Racing	Pontiac	400	211	running	185	$55,650
2	8	3	Dale Earnhardt	Richard Childress Racing	Chevrolet	400	135	running	175	$31,475
3	19	5	Geoff Bodine	Hendrick Motorsports	Chevrolet	400	0	running	165	$21,750
4	7	26	Ricky Rudd	King Racing	Buick	399	0	running	160	$16,450
5	18	33	Harry Gant	Jackson Bros. Motorsports	Oldsmobile	399	0	running	155	$15,175
6	12	17	Darrell Waltrip	Hendrick Motorsports	Chevrolet	399	0	running	150	$13,150
7	24	21	Neil Bonnett	Wood Brothers Racing	Ford	398	0	running	146	$9,475
8	21	84	Dick Trickle (R)	Stavola Brothers Racing	Buick	398	0	running	142	$9,425
9	22	57	Hut Stricklin (R)	Osterlund Racing	Pontiac	398	0	running	138	$6,100
10	5	28	Davey Allison	Robert Yates Racing	Ford	394	0	running	134	$13,450
11	25	90	Lennie Pond	Donlavey Racing	Ford	394	0	running	130	$3,475
12	4	11	Terry Labonte	Junior Johnson & Associates	Ford	391	7	running	132	$8,425
13	31	8	Bobby Hillin Jr.	Stavola Brothers Racing	Buick	383	0	running	124	$9,132
14	23	83	Lake Speed	Speed Racing	Oldsmobile	374	0	running	121	$6,425
15	14	7	Alan Kulwicki	AK Racing	Ford	372	0	running	118	$6,925
16	30	71	Dave Marcis	Marcis Auto Racing	Chevrolet	365	3	running	120	$7,975
17	10	6	Mark Martin	Roush Racing	Ford	353	0	running	112	$5,675
18	1	9	Bill Elliott	Melling Racing	Ford	334	41	drivetrain	114	$16,075
19	29	52	Jimmy Means	Jimmy Means Racing	Pontiac	324	0	fuel line	106	$2,775
20	16	16	Larry Pearson (R)	Pearson Racing	Buick	285	0	crash	103	$4,900
21	2	51	Butch Miller (R)	Miller Racing	Chevrolet	268	0	crash	100	$3,650
22	13	4	Rick Wilson	Morgan–McClure Motorsports	Oldsmobile	268	1	crash	102	$5,205
23	9	30	Michael Waltrip	Bahari Racing	Pontiac	265	0	engine	94	$5,000
24	3	25	Ken Schrader	Hendrick Motorsports	Chevrolet	226	0	crash	91	$7,675
25	15	10	Derrike Cope	Whitcomb Racing	Pontiac	202	0	engine	88	$3,600
26	17	2	Ernie Irvan	U.S. Racing	Pontiac	182	2	engine	90	$3,275
27	34	75	Morgan Shepherd	RahMoc Enterprises	Pontiac	165	0	crash	82	$9,225
28	11	94	Sterling Marlin	Hagan Racing	Oldsmobile	156	0	engine	79	$4,670
29	27	88	Jimmy Spencer (R)	Baker–Schiff Racing	Pontiac	139	0	crash	76	$4,615
30	36	40	Darin Brassfield	Brassfield Racing	Chevrolet	112	0	rear end	73	$2,495
31	32	70	J. D. McDuffie	McDuffie Racing	Pontiac	110	0	overheating	70	$2,365
32	20	42	Kyle Petty	SABCO Racing	Pontiac	76	0	crash	67	$2,335
33	35	43	Richard Petty	Petty Enterprises	Pontiac	76	0	clutch	64	$2,925
34	33	15	Brett Bodine	Bud Moore Engineering	Ford	35	0	water pump	61	$3,675
35	26	29	Dale Jarrett	Cale Yarborough Motorsports	Pontiac	17	0	crash	58	$3,675
36	28	55	Phil Parsons	Jackson Bros. Motorsports	Oldsmobile	8	0	crash	55	$3,675
Failed to qualify
37		48	Greg Sacks	Winkle Motorsports	Pontiac					
Official race results

== Standings after the race ==
Drivers' Championship standings

	Pos	Driver	Points
	1	Dale Earnhardt	3,212
	2	Rusty Wallace	3,149 (-63)
	3	Mark Martin	3,016 (-196)
	4	Darrell Waltrip	2,963 (–249)
1	5	Davey Allison	2,796 (–416)
1	6	Bill Elliott	2,796 (–416)
1	7	Ricky Rudd	2,782 (–430)
2	8	Geoff Bodine	2,726 (–486)
2	9	Ken Schrader	2,724 (–488)
1	10	Harry Gant	2,721 (–491)
Official driver's standings

- Note: Only the first 10 positions are included for the driver standings.

Previous race: 1989 Heinz Southern 500	NASCAR Winston Cup Series; 1989 season	Next race: 1989 Peak Performance 500
