= 1989 AC Spark Plug 500 =

16th race of the 1989 NASCAR Winston Cup Series

Race details
- Race 16 of 29 in the 1989 NASCAR Winston Cup Series
- The 1989 AC Spark Plug 500 program cover
- Date: July 23, 1989
- Official name: 17th Annual AC Spark Plug 500
- Location: Long Pond, Pennsylvania, Pocono Raceway
- Course: Permanent racing facility
- Course length: 2.5 miles (4.0 km)
- Distance: 200 laps, 500 mi (804.672 km)
- Scheduled distance: 200 laps, 500 mi (804.672 km)
- Average speed: 117.847 miles per hour (189.656 km/h)
- Attendance: 70,000

Pole position
Driver	Ken Schrader	Hendrick Motorsports
- Time: 57.031

Most laps led
Driver	Rusty Wallace	Blue Max Racing
- Laps: 68

Winner
No. 9	Bill Elliott	Melling Racing

Television in the United States
- Network: ESPN
- Announcers: Bob Jenkins, Benny Parsons, Ned Jarrett

Radio in the United States
- Radio: Motor Racing Network

The 1989 AC Spark Plug 500 was the 16th stock car race of the 1989 NASCAR Winston Cup Series season and the 17th iteration of the event. The race was held on Sunday, July 23, 1989, before an audience of 70,000 in Long Pond, Pennsylvania, at Pocono Raceway, a 2.5 miles (4.0 km) triangular permanent course. The race took the scheduled 200 laps to complete. In the final laps of the race, Melling Racing driver Bill Elliott would make a late-race charge, passing for the lead with six laps left in the race to take his 31st career NASCAR Winston Cup Series victory and his second victory of the season. To fill out the top three, Blue Max Racing driver Rusty Wallace and Roush Racing driver Mark Martin would finish second and third, respectively.

== Background ==
The layout of Pocono International Raceway, the venue where the race was held.

The race was held at Pocono International Raceway, which is a three-turn superspeedway located in Long Pond, Pennsylvania. The track hosts two annual NASCAR Sprint Cup Series races, as well as one Xfinity Series and Camping World Truck Series event. Until 2019, the track also hosted an IndyCar Series race.

Pocono International Raceway is one of a very few NASCAR tracks not owned by either Speedway Motorsports, Inc. or International Speedway Corporation. It is operated by the Igdalsky siblings Brandon, Nicholas, and sister Ashley, and cousins Joseph IV and Chase Mattioli, all of whom are third-generation members of the family-owned Mattco Inc, started by Joseph II and Rose Mattioli.

Outside of the NASCAR races, the track is used throughout the year by the Sports Car Club of America (SCCA) and motorcycle clubs as well as racing schools and an IndyCar race. The triangular oval also has three separate infield sections of racetrack – North Course, East Course and South Course. Each of these infield sections use a separate portion of the tri-oval to complete the track. During regular non-race weekends, multiple clubs can use the track by running on different infield sections. Also some of the infield sections can be run in either direction, or multiple infield sections can be put together – such as running the North Course and the South Course and using the tri-oval to connect the two.

=== Entry list ===
- (R) denotes rookie driver.

#	Driver	Team	Make	Sponsor
2	Ernie Irvan	U.S. Racing	Pontiac	Kroger
3	Dale Earnhardt	Richard Childress Racing	Chevrolet	GM Goodwrench Service Plus
4	Rick Wilson	Morgan–McClure Motorsports	Oldsmobile	Kodak
04	Bob Schacht	Hakes Racing	Ford	Hakes Racing
5	Geoff Bodine	Hendrick Motorsports	Chevrolet	Levi Garrett
6	Mark Martin	Roush Racing	Ford	Stroh's Light
06	Terry Byers	Byers Racing	Buick	Byers Racing
7	Alan Kulwicki	AK Racing	Ford	Zerex
8	Bobby Hillin Jr.	Stavola Brothers Racing	Buick	Miller High Life
9	Bill Elliott	Melling Racing	Ford	Coors Light
10	Derrike Cope	Whitcomb Racing	Pontiac	Purolator
11	Terry Labonte	Junior Johnson & Associates	Ford	Budweiser
13	Eddie Bierschwale	Rosenblum Racing	Chevrolet	Genesee Brewing Company
15	Brett Bodine	Bud Moore Engineering	Ford	Motorcraft
16	Larry Pearson (R)	Pearson Racing	Buick	Chattanooga Chew
17	Darrell Waltrip	Hendrick Motorsports	Chevrolet	Tide
21	Neil Bonnett	Wood Brothers Racing	Ford	Citgo
25	Ken Schrader	Hendrick Motorsports	Chevrolet	Folgers
26	Ricky Rudd	King Racing	Buick	Quaker State
27	Rusty Wallace	Blue Max Racing	Pontiac	Kodiak
28	Davey Allison	Robert Yates Racing	Ford	Texaco, Havoline
29	Dale Jarrett	Cale Yarborough Motorsports	Pontiac	Hardee's
30	Michael Waltrip	Bahari Racing	Pontiac	Country Time
33	Harry Gant	Jackson Bros. Motorsports	Oldsmobile	Skoal Bandit
38	Dick Johnson	Dick Johnson Racing	Ford	Redkote Steel Tubing
42	Kyle Petty	SABCO Racing	Pontiac	Peak Antifreeze
43	Richard Petty	Petty Enterprises	Pontiac	STP
44	Jim Sauter	Group 44	Pontiac	Group 44
48	Greg Sacks	Winkle Motorsports	Pontiac	Dinner Bell Foods
52	Jimmy Means	Jimmy Means Racing	Pontiac	Alka-Seltzer
55	Phil Parsons	Jackson Bros. Motorsports	Oldsmobile	Skoal, Crown Central Petroleum
57	Hut Stricklin (R)	Osterlund Racing	Pontiac	Heinz
62	Joe Ruttman	Douglas Smith Racing	Oldsmobile	Baja Boats
70	J. D. McDuffie	McDuffie Racing	Pontiac	Rumple Furniture
71	Dave Marcis	Marcis Auto Racing	Chevrolet	Lifebuoy
75	Morgan Shepherd	RahMoc Enterprises	Pontiac	Valvoline
80	Jimmy Horton	S&H Racing	Pontiac	S&H Racing
81	Mike Potter	Welch Racing	Ford	O. C. Welch Ford
83	Lake Speed	Speed Racing	Oldsmobile	Bull's-Eye Barbecue Sauce
84	Dick Trickle (R)	Stavola Brothers Racing	Buick	Miller High Life
88	Jimmy Spencer (R)	Baker–Schiff Racing	Pontiac	Crisco
93	Charlie Baker	Salmon Racing	Buick	Salmon Racing
94	Sterling Marlin	Hagan Racing	Oldsmobile	Sunoco
99	Norm Benning	O'Neil Racing	Chevrolet	O'Neil Racing

== Qualifying ==
Qualifying was originally scheduled to be split into two rounds. The first round was scheduled to be held on Friday, July 21, at 3:00 PM EST. However, due to fog, the first round was cancelled, and qualifying was condensed into one round, which was held on Saturday, July 22, at 8:00 AM EST. Each driver would have one lap to set a time. For this specific race, positions 1–40 would be decided on time, and depending on who needed it, a select amount of positions were given to cars who had not otherwise qualified but were high enough in owner's points; up to two provisionals were given.

Ken Schrader, driving for Hendrick Motorsports, would win the pole, setting a time of 57.031 and an average speed of 157.809 miles per hour (253.969 km/h).

Four drivers would fail to qualify.

=== Full qualifying results ===
Pos.	#	Driver	Team	Make	Time	Speed
1	25	Ken Schrader	Hendrick Motorsports	Chevrolet	57.031	157.809
2	5	Geoff Bodine	Hendrick Motorsports	Chevrolet	57.095	157.632
3	3	Dale Earnhardt	Richard Childress Racing	Chevrolet	57.174	157.414
4	7	Alan Kulwicki	AK Racing	Ford	57.223	157.279
5	15	Brett Bodine	RahMoc Enterprises	Ford	57.292	157.090
6	27	Rusty Wallace	Blue Max Racing	Pontiac	57.312	157.036
7	6	Mark Martin	Roush Racing	Ford	57.348	156.937
8	33	Harry Gant	Jackson Bros. Motorsports	Oldsmobile	57.447	156.666
9	94	Sterling Marlin	Hagan Racing	Oldsmobile	57.484	156.565
10	4	Rick Wilson	Morgan–McClure Motorsports	Oldsmobile	57.600	156.250
11	42	Kyle Petty	SABCO Racing	Pontiac	57.652	156.109
12	75	Morgan Shepherd	RahMoc Enterprises	Pontiac	57.675	156.047
13	16	Larry Pearson	Pearson Racing	Buick	57.680	156.033
14	9	Bill Elliott	Melling Racing	Ford	57.713	155.944
15	48	Greg Sacks	Winkle Motorsports	Pontiac	57.753	155.836
16	83	Lake Speed	Speed Racing	Oldsmobile	57.810	155.682
17	29	Dale Jarrett	Cale Yarborough Motorsports	Pontiac	57.812	155.677
18	26	Ricky Rudd	King Racing	Buick	57.834	155.618
19	21	Neil Bonnett	Wood Brothers Racing	Ford	57.876	155.505
20	10	Derrike Cope	Whitcomb Racing	Pontiac	57.915	155.400
21	88	Jimmy Spencer	Baker–Schiff Racing	Pontiac	57.974	155.242
22	11	Terry Labonte	Junior Johnson & Associates	Ford	58.037	155.073
23	28	Davey Allison	Robert Yates Racing	Ford	58.078	154.964
24	17	Darrell Waltrip	Hendrick Motorsports	Chevrolet	58.117	154.860
25	43	Richard Petty	Petty Enterprises	Pontiac	58.132	154.820
26	62	Joe Ruttman	Douglas Smith Racing	Oldsmobile	58.155	154.759
27	2	Ernie Irvan	U.S. Racing	Pontiac	58.179	154.695
28	30	Michael Waltrip	Bahari Racing	Pontiac	58.279	154.430
29	8	Bobby Hillin Jr.	Stavola Brothers Racing	Buick	58.313	154.340
30	44	Jim Sauter	Group 44	Pontiac	58.532	153.762
31	84	Dick Trickle	Stavola Brothers Racing	Buick	58.557	153.696
32	71	Dave Marcis	Marcis Auto Racing	Chevrolet	58.651	153.450
33	80	Jimmy Horton	S&H Racing	Pontiac	58.670	153.400
34	57	Hut Stricklin	Osterlund Racing	Pontiac	58.743	153.210
35	04	Bob Schacht	Hakes Racing	Ford	58.784	153.103
36	55	Phil Parsons	Jackson Bros. Motorsports	Oldsmobile	58.901	152.799
37	38	Dick Johnson	Dick Johnson Racing	Ford	58.998	152.548
38	13	Eddie Bierschwale	Rosenblum Racing	Chevrolet	59.085	152.323
39	06	Terry Byers	Byers Racing	Chevrolet	59.110	152.259
40	52	Jimmy Means	Jimmy Means Racing	Pontiac	59.331	151.691
Failed to qualify
41	93	Charlie Baker	Salmon Racing	Buick	-*	-*
42	70	J. D. McDuffie	McDuffie Racing	Pontiac	-*	-*
43	81	Mike Potter	Welch Racing	Ford	-*	-*
44	99	Norm Benning	O'Neil Racing	Chevrolet	-*	-*
Official starting lineup

== Race results ==
Fin	St	#	Driver	Team	Make	Laps	Led	Status	Pts	Winnings
1	14	9	Bill Elliott	Melling Racing	Ford	200	8	running	180	$58,400
2	6	27	Rusty Wallace	Blue Max Racing	Pontiac	200	68	running	180	$46,875
3	7	6	Mark Martin	Roush Racing	Ford	200	4	running	170	$26,300
4	24	17	Darrell Waltrip	Hendrick Motorsports	Chevrolet	200	19	running	165	$23,850
5	8	33	Harry Gant	Jackson Bros. Motorsports	Oldsmobile	200	0	running	155	$20,350
6	23	28	Davey Allison	Robert Yates Racing	Ford	200	1	running	155	$16,225
7	1	25	Ken Schrader	Hendrick Motorsports	Chevrolet	200	7	running	151	$16,050
8	12	75	Morgan Shepherd	RahMoc Enterprises	Pontiac	200	0	running	142	$13,925
9	3	3	Dale Earnhardt	Richard Childress Racing	Chevrolet	200	3	running	143	$14,275
10	5	15	Brett Bodine	RahMoc Enterprises	Ford	200	0	running	134	$12,250
11	29	8	Bobby Hillin Jr.	Stavola Brothers Racing	Buick	200	16	running	135	$8,950
12	36	55	Phil Parsons	Jackson Bros. Motorsports	Oldsmobile	200	0	running	127	$11,207
13	22	11	Terry Labonte	Junior Johnson & Associates	Ford	199	2	running	129	$12,850
14	11	42	Kyle Petty	SABCO Racing	Pontiac	199	16	running	126	$4,150
15	21	88	Jimmy Spencer	Baker–Schiff Racing	Pontiac	199	0	running	118	$9,400
16	30	44	Jim Sauter	Group 44	Pontiac	199	0	running	115	$3,850
17	2	5	Geoff Bodine	Hendrick Motorsports	Chevrolet	199	41	running	117	$12,750
18	17	29	Dale Jarrett	Cale Yarborough Motorsports	Pontiac	198	0	running	109	$7,550
19	32	71	Dave Marcis	Marcis Auto Racing	Chevrolet	198	5	running	111	$7,325
20	31	84	Dick Trickle	Stavola Brothers Racing	Buick	198	7	running	108	$8,175
21	39	06	Terry Byers	Byers Racing	Chevrolet	197	0	running	100	$3,175
22	37	38	Dick Johnson	Dick Johnson Racing	Ford	196	0	running	97	$3,075
23	19	21	Neil Bonnett	Wood Brothers Racing	Ford	195	3	running	99	$6,295
24	40	52	Jimmy Means	Jimmy Means Racing	Pontiac	195	0	running	91	$2,925
25	10	4	Rick Wilson	Morgan–McClure Motorsports	Oldsmobile	192	0	running	88	$6,100
26	27	2	Ernie Irvan	U.S. Racing	Pontiac	164	0	running	85	$3,825
27	35	04	Bob Schacht	Hakes Racing	Ford	139	0	engine	82	$2,775
28	28	30	Michael Waltrip	Bahari Racing	Pontiac	128	0	water pump	79	$6,675
29	16	83	Lake Speed	Speed Racing	Oldsmobile	127	0	crash	76	$5,525
30	15	48	Greg Sacks	Winkle Motorsports	Pontiac	114	0	crash	73	$3,425
31	18	26	Ricky Rudd	King Racing	Buick	111	0	engine	70	$9,575
32	38	13	Eddie Bierschwale	Rosenblum Racing	Chevrolet	83	0	crash	67	$2,575
33	33	80	Jimmy Horton	S&H Racing	Pontiac	71	0	crash	64	$3,175
34	26	62	Joe Ruttman	Douglas Smith Racing	Oldsmobile	60	0	engine	61	$2,400
35	20	10	Derrike Cope	Whitcomb Racing	Pontiac	56	0	engine	58	$3,100
36	9	94	Sterling Marlin	Hagan Racing	Oldsmobile	45	0	engine	55	$5,000
37	34	57	Hut Stricklin	Osterlund Racing	Pontiac	24	0	engine	52	$2,925
38	25	43	Richard Petty	Petty Enterprises	Pontiac	22	0	engne	49	$2,875
39	4	7	Alan Kulwicki	AK Racing	Ford	10	0	engine	46	$4,825
40	13	16	Larry Pearson	Pearson Racing	Buick	2	0	oil line	43	$2,740
Failed to qualify
41		93	Charlie Baker	Salmon Racing	Buick					
42		70	J. D. McDuffie	McDuffie Racing	Pontiac					
43		81	Mike Potter	Welch Racing	Ford					
44		99	Norm Benning	O'Neil Racing	Chevrolet					
Official race results

== Standings after the race ==
Drivers' Championship standings

	Pos	Driver	Points
	1	Dale Earnhardt	2,314
	2	Rusty Wallace	2,227 (-87)
	3	Darrell Waltrip	2,179 (-135)
1	4	Bill Elliott	2,153 (–161)
1	5	Mark Martin	2,148 (–166)
3	6	Davey Allison	2,016 (–298)
1	7	Geoff Bodine	1,996 (–318)
2	8	Sterling Marlin	1,995 (–319)
1	9	Terry Labonte	1,984 (–330)
1	10	Ken Schrader	1,971 (–343)
Official driver's standings

- Note: Only the first 10 positions are included for the driver standings.

Previous race: 1989 Pepsi 400	NASCAR Winston Cup Series; 1989 season	Next race: 1989 Talladega DieHard 500
