= 1988 First Union 400 =

Seventh race of the 1988 NASCAR Winston Cup Series

Race details
- Race 7 of 29 in the 1988 NASCAR Winston Cup Series
- The 1988 First Union 400 program cover, featuring Dale Earnhardt and Richard Childress.
- Date: April 17, 1988
- Official name: 38th Annual First Union 400
- Location: North Wilkesboro Speedway, North Wilkesboro, North Carolina
- Course: Permanent racing facility
- Course length: 1.006 km (0.625 miles)
- Distance: 400 laps, 250 mi (402.336 km)
- Scheduled distance: 400 laps, 250 mi (402.336 km)
- Average speed: 99.075 miles per hour (159.446 km/h)
- Attendance: 33,000

Pole position
Driver	Terry Labonte	Junior Johnson & Associates
- Time: 19.178

Most laps led
Driver	Dale Earnhardt	Richard Childress Racing
- Laps: 235

Winner
No. 11	Terry Labonte	Junior Johnson & Associates

Television in the United States
- Network: ESPN
- Announcers: Bob Jenkins, Ned Jarrett, Gary Nelson

Radio in the United States
- Radio: Motor Racing Network

The 1988 First Union 400 was the seventh stock car race of the 1988 NASCAR Winston Cup Series season and the 38th iteration of the event. The race was held on Sunday, April 17, 1988, before an audience of 33,000 in North Wilkesboro, North Carolina at the North Wilkesboro Speedway, a 0.625 miles (1.006 km) oval short track. The race took the scheduled 400 laps to complete. Taking advantage of a misfortunate Dale Earnhardt, who had suffered a leaking tire late in the race, Junior Johnson & Associates driver Terry Labonte would manage to pass for the lead with 13 laps left in the race, maintaining the lead to take the victory. The victory was Labonte's ninth career NASCAR Winston Cup Series victory and his only victory of the season. To fill out the top three, King Racing driver Ricky Rudd and the aforementioned Dale Earnhardt would finish second and third, respectively.

== Background ==
The layout of North Wilkesboro Speedway, the venue where the race was held

North Wilkesboro Speedway is a short oval racetrack located on U.S. Route 421, about five miles east of the town of North Wilkesboro, North Carolina, or 80 miles north of Charlotte. It measures 0.625 mi (1.006 km) and features a unique uphill backstretch and downhill frontstretch. It has previously held races in NASCAR's top three series, including 93 Winston Cup Series races. The track, a NASCAR original, operated from 1949, NASCAR's inception, until the track's original closure in 1996. The speedway briefly reopened in 2010 and hosted several stock car series races before closing again in the spring of 2011. It was re-opened in August 2022 for grassroots racing.

=== Entry list ===
- (R) denotes rookie driver.

#	Driver	Team	Make	Sponsor
00	Gary Brooks	Brooks Racing	Chevrolet	Brooks Racing
2	Ernie Irvan (R)	U.S. Racing	Chevrolet	Kroger
3	Dale Earnhardt	Richard Childress Racing	Chevrolet	GM Goodwrench
4	Rick Wilson	Morgan–McClure Motorsports	Oldsmobile	Kodak
04	Bill Meacham	Meacham Racing	Oldsmobile	Meacham Racing
5	Geoff Bodine	Hendrick Motorsports	Chevrolet	Levi Garrett
6	Mark Martin	Roush Racing	Ford	Stroh's Light
7	Alan Kulwicki	AK Racing	Ford	Zerex
8	Bobby Hillin Jr.	Stavola Brothers Racing	Buick	Miller High Life
9	Bill Elliott	Melling Racing	Ford	Coors Light
09	Doug French	Caragias Racing	Chevrolet	Caragias Racing
10	Ken Bouchard (R)	Whitcomb Racing	Chevrolet	Whitcomb Racing
11	Terry Labonte	Junior Johnson & Associates	Chevrolet	Budweiser
12	Bobby Allison	Stavola Brothers Racing	Buick	Miller High Life
15	Brett Bodine	Bud Moore Engineering	Ford	Crisco
17	Darrell Waltrip	Hendrick Motorsports	Chevrolet	Tide
20	Alan Russell	Russell Racing	Chevrolet	Russell Racing
21	Kyle Petty	Wood Brothers Racing	Ford	Citgo
25	Ken Schrader	Hendrick Motorsports	Chevrolet	Folgers
26	Ricky Rudd	King Racing	Buick	Quaker State
27	Rusty Wallace	Blue Max Racing	Pontiac	Kodiak
28	Davey Allison	Ranier-Lundy Racing	Ford	Texaco, Havoline
29	Dale Jarrett	Cale Yarborough Motorsports	Oldsmobile	Hardee's
30	Michael Waltrip	Bahari Racing	Pontiac	Country Time
31	Brad Teague	Bob Clark Motorsports	Oldsmobile	Slender You Figure Salons
33	Harry Gant	Mach 1 Racing	Chevrolet	Skoal Bandit
43	Richard Petty	Petty Enterprises	Pontiac	STP
44	Sterling Marlin	Hagan Racing	Oldsmobile	Piedmont Airlines
46	Glenn Moffat	Moffat Racing	Chevrolet	Moffat Racing
52	Jimmy Means	Jimmy Means Racing	Chevrolet	Eureka
55	Phil Parsons	Jackson Bros. Motorsports	Oldsmobile	Skoal, Crown Central Petroleum
67	Rick Jeffrey	Arrington Racing	Chevrolet	Pannill Sweatshirts
68	Derrike Cope	Testa Racing	Ford	Purolator
70	Jeff McDuffie	McDuffie Racing	Pontiac	Rumple Furniture
71	Dave Marcis	Marcis Auto Racing	Chevrolet	Lifebuoy
75	Neil Bonnett	RahMoc Enterprises	Pontiac	Valvoline
78	Jay Sommers	Sommers Racing	Chevrolet	Doe & Associates
83	Lake Speed	Speed Racing	Oldsmobile	Wynn's, Kmart
88	Buddy Baker	Baker–Schiff Racing	Oldsmobile	Red Baron Frozen Pizza
90	Benny Parsons	Donlavey Racing	Ford	Bull's-Eye Barbecue Sauce
97	Rodney Combs	Winkle Motorsports	Buick	AC Spark Plug
98	Brad Noffsinger (R)	Curb Racing	Buick	Sunoco

== Qualifying ==
Qualifying was split into two rounds. The first round was held on Friday, April 14, at 3:00 pm EST. Each driver would have one lap to set a time. During the first round, the top 10 drivers in the round would be guaranteed a starting spot in the race. If a driver was not able to guarantee a spot in the first round, they had the option to scrub their time from the first round and try and run a faster lap time in a second round qualifying run, held on Saturday, April 15, at 12:15 pm EST. As with the first round, each driver would have one lap to set a time. For this specific race, positions 11-30 would be decided on time, and depending on who needed it, a select amount of positions were given to cars who had not otherwise qualified but were high enough in owner's points; up to two were given.

Terry Labonte, driving for Junior Johnson & Associates, would win the pole, setting a time of 19.178 and an average speed of 117.322 miles per hour (188.811 km/h) in the first round.

Ten drivers would fail to qualify.

=== Full qualifying results ===
Pos.	#	Driver	Team	Make	Time	Speed
1	11	Terry Labonte	Junior Johnson & Associates	Chevrolet	19.178	117.322
2	9	Bill Elliott	Melling Racing	Ford	19.185	117.279
3	27	Rusty Wallace	Blue Max Racing	Pontiac	19.198	117.200
4	6	Mark Martin	Roush Racing	Ford	19.215	117.096
5	25	Ken Schrader	Hendrick Motorsports	Chevrolet	19.232	116.993
6	21	Kyle Petty	Wood Brothers Racing	Ford	19.262	116.810
7	26	Ricky Rudd	King Racing	Buick	19.266	116.786
8	75	Neil Bonnett	RahMoc Enterprises	Pontiac	19.268	116.774
9	43	Richard Petty	Petty Enterprises	Pontiac	19.272	116.750
10	3	Dale Earnhardt	Richard Childress Racing	Chevrolet	19.313	116.502
Failed to lock in Round 1
11	90	Benny Parsons	Donlavey Racing	Ford	19.331	116.393
12	55	Phil Parsons	Jackson Bros. Motorsports	Oldsmobile	19.343	116.321
13	5	Geoff Bodine	Hendrick Motorsports	Chevrolet	19.360	116.219
14	30	Michael Waltrip	Bahari Racing	Pontiac	19.365	116.189
15	33	Harry Gant	Mach 1 Racing	Chevrolet	19.379	116.105
16	7	Alan Kulwicki	AK Racing	Ford	19.392	116.027
17	15	Brett Bodine	Bud Moore Engineering	Ford	19.397	115.997
18	17	Darrell Waltrip	Hendrick Motorsports	Chevrolet	19.406	115.944
19	71	Dave Marcis	Marcis Auto Racing	Chevrolet	19.407	115.938
20	28	Davey Allison	Ranier-Lundy Racing	Ford	19.419	115.866
21	29	Dale Jarrett	Cale Yarborough Motorsports	Oldsmobile	19.425	115.830
22	44	Sterling Marlin	Hagan Racing	Oldsmobile	19.448	115.693
23	2	Ernie Irvan (R)	U.S. Racing	Pontiac	19.456	115.646
24	68	Derrike Cope	Testa Racing	Ford	19.482	115.491
25	97	Rodney Combs	Winkle Motorsports	Buick	19.503	115.367
26	83	Lake Speed	Speed Racing	Oldsmobile	19.510	115.325
27	12	Bobby Allison	Stavola Brothers Racing	Buick	19.514	115.302
28	4	Rick Wilson	Morgan–McClure Motorsports	Oldsmobile	19.562	115.019
29	52	Jimmy Means	Jimmy Means Racing	Pontiac	19.596	114.819
30	88	Buddy Baker	Baker–Schiff Racing	Oldsmobile	19.713	114.138
Provisionals
31	8	Bobby Hillin Jr.	Stavola Brothers Racing	Buick	-*	-*
32	10	Ken Bouchard (R)	Whitcomb Racing	Chevrolet	-*	-*
Failed to qualify
33	31	Brad Teague	Bob Clark Motorsports	Oldsmobile	-*	-*
34	98	Brad Noffsinger (R)	Curb Racing	Buick	-*	-*
35	78	Jay Sommers	Sommers Racing	Chevrolet	-*	-*
36	09	Doug French	Caragias Racing	Chevrolet	-*	-*
37	04	Bill Meacham	Meacham Racing	Oldsmobile	-*	-*
38	67	Rick Jeffrey	Arrington Racing	Chevrolet	-*	-*
39	46	Glenn Moffat	Moffat Racing	Chevrolet	-*	-*
40	70	Jeff McDuffie	McDuffie Racing	Pontiac	-*	-*
41	00	Gary Brooks	Brooks Racing	Chevrolet	-*	-*
42	20	Alan Russell	Russell Racing	Chevrolet	-*	-*
Official first round qualifying results
Official starting lineup

== Race results ==
Fin	St	#	Driver	Team	Make	Laps	Led	Status	Pts	Winnings
1	1	11	Terry Labonte	Junior Johnson & Associates	Chevrolet	400	142	running	180	$48,050
2	7	26	Ricky Rudd	King Racing	Buick	400	3	running	175	$21,025
3	10	3	Dale Earnhardt	Richard Childress Racing	Chevrolet	400	235	running	175	$22,115
4	3	27	Rusty Wallace	Blue Max Racing	Pontiac	400	0	running	160	$14,650
5	6	21	Kyle Petty	Wood Brothers Racing	Ford	400	0	running	155	$12,965
6	9	43	Richard Petty	Petty Enterprises	Pontiac	398	0	running	150	$9,560
7	12	55	Phil Parsons	Jackson Bros. Motorsports	Oldsmobile	398	0	running	146	$6,760
8	20	28	Davey Allison	Ranier-Lundy Racing	Ford	398	0	running	142	$10,715
9	13	5	Geoff Bodine	Hendrick Motorsports	Chevrolet	398	0	running	138	$5,610
10	2	9	Bill Elliott	Melling Racing	Ford	397	19	running	139	$12,010
11	5	25	Ken Schrader	Hendrick Motorsports	Chevrolet	397	0	running	130	$7,280
12	15	33	Harry Gant	Mach 1 Racing	Chevrolet	397	0	running	127	$5,105
13	17	15	Brett Bodine	Bud Moore Engineering	Ford	397	0	running	124	$9,130
14	18	17	Darrell Waltrip	Hendrick Motorsports	Chevrolet	396	0	running	121	$7,475
15	16	7	Alan Kulwicki	AK Racing	Ford	396	0	running	118	$5,330
16	22	44	Sterling Marlin	Hagan Racing	Oldsmobile	396	0	running	115	$4,580
17	11	90	Benny Parsons	Donlavey Racing	Ford	395	0	running	112	$4,455
18	31	8	Bobby Hillin Jr.	Stavola Brothers Racing	Buick	394	0	running	109	$5,380
19	8	75	Neil Bonnett	RahMoc Enterprises	Pontiac	394	1	running	111	$8,330
20	27	12	Bobby Allison	Stavola Brothers Racing	Buick	393	0	running	103	$8,805
21	21	29	Dale Jarrett	Cale Yarborough Motorsports	Oldsmobile	393	0	running	100	$1,510
22	24	68	Derrike Cope	Testa Racing	Ford	392	0	running	97	$3,785
23	25	97	Rodney Combs	Winkle Motorsports	Buick	391	0	running	94	$2,685
24	23	2	Ernie Irvan (R)	U.S. Racing	Pontiac	390	0	running	91	$2,860
25	19	71	Dave Marcis	Marcis Auto Racing	Chevrolet	388	0	running	88	$3,660
26	26	83	Lake Speed	Speed Racing	Oldsmobile	384	0	running	85	$1,485
27	32	10	Ken Bouchard (R)	Whitcomb Racing	Chevrolet	384	0	running	82	$1,660
28	28	4	Rick Wilson	Morgan–McClure Motorsports	Oldsmobile	381	0	running	79	$1,985
29	4	6	Mark Martin	Roush Racing	Ford	327	0	running	76	$1,335
30	29	52	Jimmy Means	Jimmy Means Racing	Pontiac	263	0	brakes	73	$2,760
31	30	88	Buddy Baker	Baker–Schiff Racing	Oldsmobile	130	0	rear end	70	$2,810
32	14	30	Michael Waltrip	Bahari Racing	Pontiac	24	0	engine	67	$4,760
Failed to qualify
33		31	Brad Teague	Bob Clark Motorsports	Oldsmobile					
34		98	Brad Noffsinger (R)	Curb Racing	Buick					
35		78	Jay Sommers	Sommers Racing	Chevrolet					
36		09	Doug French	Caragias Racing	Chevrolet					
37		04	Bill Meacham	Meacham Racing	Oldsmobile					
38		67	Rick Jeffrey	Arrington Racing	Chevrolet					
39		46	Glenn Moffat	Moffat Racing	Chevrolet					
40		70	Jeff McDuffie	McDuffie Racing	Pontiac					
41		00	Gary Brooks	Brooks Racing	Chevrolet					
42		20	Alan Russell	Russell Racing	Chevrolet					
Official race results

== Standings after the race ==
Drivers' Championship standings

	Pos	Driver	Points
	1	Dale Earnhardt	1,059
3	2	Rusty Wallace	1,006 (-53)
2	3	Bill Elliott	999 (-60)
2	4	Sterling Marlin	992 (–67)
2	5	Neil Bonnett	979 (–80)
	6	Bobby Allison	943 (–116)
	7	Terry Labonte	932 (–127)
3	8	Geoff Bodine	882 (–177)
1	9	Ken Schrader	879 (–180)
2	10	Darrell Waltrip	872 (–187)
Official driver's standings

- Note: Only the first 10 positions are included for the driver standings.

Previous race: 1988 Valleydale Meats 500	NASCAR Winston Cup Series; 1988 season	Next race: 1988 Pannill Sweatshirts 500
