= 1989 Peak Performance 500 =

23rd race of the 1989 NASCAR Winston Cup Series

Race details
- Race 23 of 29 in the 1989 NASCAR Winston Cup Series
- The 1989 Peak Performance 500 program cover, featuring Kyle Petty.
- Date: September 17, 1989
- Official name: 19th Annual Peak Performance 500
- Location: Dover, Delaware, Dover Downs International Speedway
- Course: Permanent racing facility
- Course length: 1 miles (1.6 km)
- Distance: 500 laps, 500 mi (804.672 km)
- Scheduled distance: 500 laps, 500 mi (804.672 km)
- Average speed: 122.909 miles per hour (197.803 km/h)
- Attendance: 64,000

Pole position
Driver	Davey Allison	Robert Yates Racing
- Time: 24.629

Most laps led
Driver	Dale Earnhardt	Richard Childress Racing
- Laps: 375

Winner
No. 3	Dale Earnhardt	Richard Childress Racing

Television in the United States
- Network: ESPN
- Announcers: Bob Jenkins, Benny Parsons, Ned Jarrett

Radio in the United States
- Radio: Motor Racing Network

The 1989 Peak Performance 500 was the 23rd stock car race of the 1989 NASCAR Winston Cup Series season and the 19th iteration of the event. The race was held on Sunday, September 17, 1989, before an audience of 64,000 in Dover, Delaware at Dover Downs International Speedway, a 1-mile (1.6 km) permanent oval-shaped racetrack. The race took the scheduled 500 laps to complete. At race's end, Richard Childress Racing driver Dale Earnhardt would manage to fend off Roush Racing driver Mark Martin in the final laps of the race, completing a dominant performance of the race. The victory was Earnhardt's 38th career NASCAR Winston Cup Series victory and his fourth victory of the season. To fill out the top three, the aforementioned Mark Martin and Hendrick Motorsports driver Ken Schrader would finish second and third, respectively.

== Background ==
The layout of Dover Downs International Speedway, the venue where the race was held.

Dover Downs International Speedway is an oval race track in Dover, Delaware, United States that has held at least two NASCAR races since it opened in 1969. In addition to NASCAR, the track also hosted USAC and the NTT IndyCar Series. The track features one layout, a 1-mile (1.6 km) concrete oval, with 24° banking in the turns and 9° banking on the straights. The speedway is owned and operated by Dover Motorsports.

The track, nicknamed "The Monster Mile", was built in 1969 by Melvin Joseph of Melvin L. Joseph Construction Company, Inc., with an asphalt surface, but was replaced with concrete in 1995. Six years later in 2001, the track's capacity moved to 135,000 seats, making the track have the largest capacity of sports venue in the mid-Atlantic. In 2002, the name changed to Dover International Speedway from Dover Downs International Speedway after Dover Downs Gaming and Entertainment split, making Dover Motorsports. From 2007 to 2009, the speedway worked on an improvement project called "The Monster Makeover", which expanded facilities at the track and beautified the track. After the 2014 season, the track's capacity was reduced to 95,500 seats.

=== Entry list ===
- (R) denotes rookie driver.

#	Driver	Team	Make	Sponsor
2	Ernie Irvan	U.S. Racing	Pontiac	Kroger
3	Dale Earnhardt	Richard Childress Racing	Chevrolet	GM Goodwrench Service Plus
4	Rick Wilson	Morgan–McClure Motorsports	Oldsmobile	Kodak
04	Andy Belmont	Hakes Racing	Ford	Ed Learn Ford
5	Geoff Bodine	Hendrick Motorsports	Chevrolet	Levi Garrett
6	Mark Martin	Roush Racing	Ford	Stroh's Light
7	Alan Kulwicki	AK Racing	Ford	Zerex
8	Bobby Hillin Jr.	Stavola Brothers Racing	Buick	Miller High Life
9	Bill Elliott	Melling Racing	Ford	Coors Light
10	Derrike Cope	Whitcomb Racing	Pontiac	Purolator
11	Terry Labonte	Junior Johnson & Associates	Ford	Budweiser
15	Brett Bodine	Bud Moore Engineering	Ford	Motorcraft
16	Larry Pearson (R)	Pearson Racing	Buick	Chattanooga Chew
17	Darrell Waltrip	Hendrick Motorsports	Chevrolet	Tide
21	Neil Bonnett	Wood Brothers Racing	Ford	Citgo
22	Rob Moroso	Moroso Racing	Oldsmobile	Prestone
25	Ken Schrader	Hendrick Motorsports	Chevrolet	Folgers
26	Ricky Rudd	King Racing	Buick	Quaker State
27	Rusty Wallace	Blue Max Racing	Pontiac	Kodiak
28	Davey Allison	Robert Yates Racing	Ford	Texaco, Havoline
29	Dale Jarrett	Cale Yarborough Motorsports	Pontiac	Hardee's
30	Michael Waltrip	Bahari Racing	Pontiac	Country Time
33	Harry Gant	Jackson Bros. Motorsports	Oldsmobile	Skoal Bandit
42	Kyle Petty	SABCO Racing	Pontiac	Peak Antifreeze
43	Richard Petty	Petty Enterprises	Pontiac	STP
44	Jim Sauter	Group 44	Pontiac	Group 44
49	James Hylton	Hylton Motorsports	Buick	Hylton Motorsports
52	Jimmy Means	Jimmy Means Racing	Pontiac	Alka-Seltzer
55	Phil Parsons	Jackson Bros. Motorsports	Oldsmobile	Skoal, Crown Central Petroleum
57	Hut Stricklin (R)	Osterlund Racing	Pontiac	Heinz
65	Tommie Crozier	Leonard Racing	Chevrolet	Universal Steel
70	J. D. McDuffie	McDuffie Racing	Pontiac	McDuffie Racing
71	Dave Marcis	Marcis Auto Racing	Chevrolet	Lifebuoy
75	Morgan Shepherd	RahMoc Enterprises	Pontiac	Valvoline
83	Lake Speed	Speed Racing	Oldsmobile	Bull's-Eye Barbecue Sauce
84	Dick Trickle (R)	Stavola Brothers Racing	Buick	Miller High Life
88	Jimmy Spencer (R)	Baker–Schiff Racing	Pontiac	Crisco
92	Jack Ely	North Star Racing	Buick	North Star Racing
94	Sterling Marlin	Hagan Racing	Oldsmobile	Sunoco
99	Norm Benning	O'Neil Racing	Chevrolet	O'Neil Racing

== Qualifying ==
Qualifying was split into two rounds. The first round was held on Friday, September 14, at 3:00 PM EST. Each driver would have one lap to set a time. During the first round, the top 20 drivers in the round would be guaranteed a starting spot in the race. If a driver was not able to guarantee a spot in the first round, they had the option to scrub their time from the first round and try and run a faster lap time in a second round qualifying run, held on Saturday, September 15, at 11:30 AM EST. As with the first round, each driver would have one lap to set a time. For this specific race, positions 21-40 would be decided on time, and depending on who needed it, a select amount of positions were given to cars who had not otherwise qualified but were high enough in owner's points; up to two provisionals were given.

Davey Allison, driving for Robert Yates Racing, would win the pole, setting a time of 24.629 and an average speed of 146.169 miles per hour (235.236 km/h) in the first round.

No drivers would fail to qualify.

=== Full qualifying results ===
Pos.	#	Driver	Team	Make	Time	Speed
1	28	Davey Allison	Robert Yates Racing	Ford	24.629	146.169
2	7	Alan Kulwicki	AK Racing	Ford	24.711	145.684
3	25	Ken Schrader	Hendrick Motorsports	Chevrolet	24.749	145.460
4	27	Rusty Wallace	Blue Max Racing	Pontiac	24.752	145.443
5	5	Geoff Bodine	Hendrick Motorsports	Chevrolet	24.778	145.290
6	84	Dick Trickle (R)	Stavola Brothers Racing	Buick	24.841	144.922
7	9	Bill Elliott	Melling Racing	Ford	24.884	144.671
8	16	Larry Pearson (R)	Pearson Racing	Buick	24.902	144.567
9	17	Darrell Waltrip	Hendrick Motorsports	Chevrolet	24.921	144.456
10	6	Mark Martin	Roush Racing	Ford	24.928	144.416
11	4	Rick Wilson	Morgan–McClure Motorsports	Oldsmobile	24.951	144.283
12	94	Sterling Marlin	Hagan Racing	Oldsmobile	24.958	144.242
13	33	Harry Gant	Jackson Bros. Motorsports	Oldsmobile	24.964	144.208
14	26	Ricky Rudd	King Racing	Buick	25.021	143.879
15	3	Dale Earnhardt	Richard Childress Racing	Chevrolet	25.037	143.787
16	30	Michael Waltrip	Bahari Racing	Pontiac	25.058	143.667
17	55	Phil Parsons	Jackson Bros. Motorsports	Oldsmobile	25.062	143.644
18	75	Morgan Shepherd	RahMoc Enterprises	Pontiac	25.063	143.638
19	10	Derrike Cope	Whitcomb Racing	Pontiac	25.073	143.581
20	42	Kyle Petty	SABCO Racing	Pontiac	25.083	143.524
Failed to lock in Round 1
21	22	Rob Moroso	Moroso Racing	Oldsmobile	24.839	144.933
22	15	Brett Bodine	Bud Moore Engineering	Ford	25.001	143.994
23	83	Lake Speed	Speed Racing	Oldsmobile	25.009	143.948
24	2	Ernie Irvan	U.S. Racing	Pontiac	25.103	143.409
25	11	Terry Labonte	Junior Johnson & Associates	Ford	25.175	142.999
26	21	Neil Bonnett	Wood Brothers Racing	Ford	25.244	142.608
27	88	Jimmy Spencer (R)	Baker–Schiff Racing	Pontiac	25.316	142.203
28	29	Dale Jarrett	Cale Yarborough Motorsports	Pontiac	25.328	142.135
29	57	Hut Stricklin (R)	Osterlund Racing	Pontiac	25.466	141.365
30	8	Bobby Hillin Jr.	Stavola Brothers Racing	Buick	25.471	141.337
31	71	Dave Marcis	Marcis Auto Racing	Chevrolet	25.498	141.188
32	43	Richard Petty	Petty Enterprises	Pontiac	25.584	140.713
33	44	Jim Sauter	Group 44	Pontiac	25.604	140.603
34	52	Jimmy Means	Jimmy Means Racing	Pontiac	25.680	140.187
35	04	Andy Belmont	Hakes Racing	Ford	26.315	136.804
36	99	Norm Benning	O'Neil Racing	Chevrolet	26.414	136.291
37	92	Jack Ely	North Star Racing	Buick	26.905	133.804
38	49	James Hylton	Hylton Motorsports	Buick	26.914	133.759
39	70	J. D. McDuffie	McDuffie Racing	Pontiac	27.125	132.719
40	65	Tommie Crozier	Leonard Racing	Chevrolet	27.764	129.664
Official first round qualifying results
Official starting lineup

== Race results ==
Fin	St	#	Driver	Team	Make	Laps	Led	Status	Pts	Winnings
1	15	3	Dale Earnhardt	Richard Childress Racing	Chevrolet	500	375	running	185	$59,950
2	10	6	Mark Martin	Roush Racing	Ford	500	34	running	175	$35,540
3	3	25	Ken Schrader	Hendrick Motorsports	Chevrolet	500	21	running	170	$25,875
4	7	9	Bill Elliott	Melling Racing	Ford	499	0	running	160	$23,125
5	14	26	Ricky Rudd	King Racing	Buick	498	0	running	155	$18,375
6	16	30	Michael Waltrip	Bahari Racing	Pontiac	498	0	running	150	$11,675
7	4	27	Rusty Wallace	Blue Max Racing	Pontiac	497	0	running	146	$16,475
8	19	10	Derrike Cope	Whitcomb Racing	Pontiac	497	2	running	147	$7,875
9	22	15	Brett Bodine	Bud Moore Engineering	Ford	497	0	running	138	$9,175
10	27	88	Jimmy Spencer (R)	Baker–Schiff Racing	Pontiac	496	0	running	134	$11,925
11	20	42	Kyle Petty	SABCO Racing	Pontiac	496	0	running	130	$4,025
12	33	44	Jim Sauter	Group 44	Pontiac	495	0	running	127	$6,082
13	17	55	Phil Parsons	Jackson Bros. Motorsports	Oldsmobile	494	0	running	124	$7,175
14	25	11	Terry Labonte	Junior Johnson & Associates	Ford	494	0	running	121	$10,025
15	30	8	Bobby Hillin Jr.	Stavola Brothers Racing	Buick	492	0	running	118	$7,525
16	18	75	Morgan Shepherd	RahMoc Enterprises	Pontiac	492	0	running	115	$10,800
17	12	94	Sterling Marlin	Hagan Racing	Oldsmobile	489	0	running	112	$6,350
18	9	17	Darrell Waltrip	Hendrick Motorsports	Chevrolet	484	0	running	109	$11,300
19	11	4	Rick Wilson	Morgan–McClure Motorsports	Oldsmobile	483	0	running	106	$5,950
20	29	57	Hut Stricklin (R)	Osterlund Racing	Pontiac	479	0	running	103	$4,875
21	34	52	Jimmy Means	Jimmy Means Racing	Pontiac	476	0	running	100	$2,550
22	31	71	Dave Marcis	Marcis Auto Racing	Chevrolet	475	0	running	97	$5,500
23	28	29	Dale Jarrett	Cale Yarborough Motorsports	Pontiac	472	0	engine	94	$5,400
24	1	28	Davey Allison	Robert Yates Racing	Ford	470	37	engine	96	$14,300
25	6	84	Dick Trickle (R)	Stavola Brothers Racing	Buick	451	15	crash	93	$6,075
26	26	21	Neil Bonnett	Wood Brothers Racing	Ford	449	0	crash	85	$5,050
27	5	5	Geoff Bodine	Hendrick Motorsports	Chevrolet	427	0	crash	82	$9,250
28	21	22	Rob Moroso	Moroso Racing	Oldsmobile	414	0	crash	79	$2,700
29	35	04	Andy Belmont	Hakes Racing	Ford	373	0	brakes	76	$2,150
30	32	43	Richard Petty	Petty Enterprises	Pontiac	351	0	fatigue	73	$2,850
31	36	99	Norm Benning	O'Neil Racing	Chevrolet	276	0	wheel bearing	70	$2,050
32	2	7	Alan Kulwicki	AK Racing	Ford	274	16	engine	72	$5,075
33	24	2	Ernie Irvan	U.S. Racing	Pontiac	266	0	ignition	64	$2,600
34	39	70	J. D. McDuffie	McDuffie Racing	Pontiac	237	0	engine	61	$1,900
35	37	92	Jack Ely	North Star Racing	Buick	204	0	rear end	58	$1,800
36	23	83	Lake Speed	Speed Racing	Oldsmobile	125	0	engine	55	$4,400
37	40	65	Tommie Crozier	Leonard Racing	Chevrolet	96	0	vibration	52	$1,750
38	13	33	Harry Gant	Jackson Bros. Motorsports	Oldsmobile	54	0	crank	49	$8,700
39	38	49	James Hylton	Hylton Motorsports	Buick	25	0	engine	46	$1,675
40	8	16	Larry Pearson (R)	Pearson Racing	Buick	1	0	engine	43	$2,250
Official race results

== Standings after the race ==
Drivers' Championship standings

	Pos	Driver	Points
	1	Dale Earnhardt	3,397
	2	Rusty Wallace	3,295 (-102)
	3	Mark Martin	3,191 (-206)
	4	Darrell Waltrip	3,072 (–325)
1	5	Bill Elliott	2,956 (–441)
1	6	Ricky Rudd	2,937 (–460)
2	7	Ken Schrader	2,894 (–503)
3	8	Davey Allison	2,892 (–505)
1	9	Geoff Bodine	2,808 (–589)
1	10	Terry Labonte	2,805 (–592)
Official driver's standings

- Note: Only the first 10 positions are included for the driver standings.

Previous race: 1989 Miller High Life 400 (Richmond)	NASCAR Winston Cup Series; 1989 season	Next race: 1989 Goody's 500
