= 1989 Talladega DieHard 500 =

17th race of the 1989 NASCAR Winston Cup Series

Race details
- Race 17 of 29 in the 1989 NASCAR Winston Cup Series
- The 1989 Talladega DieHard 500 program cover, featuring Ken Schrader.
- Date: July 30, 1989
- Official name: 21st Annual Talladega DieHard 500
- Location: Lincoln, Alabama, Alabama International Motor Speedway
- Course: Permanent racing facility
- Course length: 2.66 miles (4.28 km)
- Distance: 188 laps, 500.08 mi (804.8 km)
- Scheduled distance: 188 laps, 500.08 mi (804.8 km)
- Average speed: 157.354 miles per hour (253.237 km/h)
- Attendance: 90,000

Pole position
Driver	Mark Martin	Roush Racing
- Time: 49.158

Most laps led
Driver	Morgan Shepherd	RahMoc Enterprises
- Laps: 70

Winner
No. 11	Terry Labonte	Junior Johnson & Associates

Television in the United States
- Network: CBS
- Announcers: Ken Squier, Ned Jarrett, Chris Economaki

Radio in the United States
- Radio: Motor Racing Network

The 1989 Talladega DieHard 500 was the 17th stock car race of the 1989 NASCAR Winston Cup Series season and the 21st iteration of the event. The race was held on Sunday, July 30, 1989, before an audience of 90,000 in Lincoln, Alabama at Alabama International Motor Speedway, a 2.66 miles (4.28 km) permanent triangle-shaped superspeedway. The race took the scheduled 188 laps to complete. On the final restart with five laps left in the race, Junior Johnson & Associates driver Terry Labonte would manage to defend the field, mainly defending Hendrick Motorsports driver Darrell Waltrip to take his 11th career NASCAR Winston Cup Series victory and his second and final victory of the season. To fill out the top three, the aforementioned Darrell Waltrip and Roush Racing driver Mark Martin would finish second and third, respectively.

== Background ==
The layout of Talladega Superspeedway, the venue where the race was held.

Talladega Superspeedway, originally known as Alabama International Motor Superspeedway (AIMS), is a motorsports complex located north of Talladega, Alabama. It is located on the former Anniston Air Force Base in the small city of Lincoln. The track is a tri-oval and was constructed in the 1960s by the International Speedway Corporation, a business controlled by the France family. Talladega is most known for its steep banking and the unique location of the start/finish line that's located just past the exit to pit road. The track currently hosts the NASCAR series such as the NASCAR Cup Series, Xfinity Series and the Camping World Truck Series. Talladega is the longest NASCAR oval, a 2.66-mile-long (4.28 km) tri-oval like the Daytona International Speedway, which also is a 2.5-mile-long (4.0 km) tri-oval.

=== Entry list ===
- (R) denotes rookie driver.

#	Driver	Team	Make
2	Ernie Irvan	U.S. Racing	Pontiac
3	Dale Earnhardt	Richard Childress Racing	Chevrolet
4	Rick Wilson	Morgan–McClure Motorsports	Oldsmobile
5	Geoff Bodine	Hendrick Motorsports	Chevrolet
6	Mark Martin	Roush Racing	Ford
7	Alan Kulwicki	AK Racing	Ford
8	Bobby Hillin Jr.	Stavola Brothers Racing	Buick
9	Bill Elliott	Melling Racing	Ford
10	Derrike Cope	Whitcomb Racing	Pontiac
11	Terry Labonte	Junior Johnson & Associates	Ford
14	A. J. Foyt	A. J. Foyt Racing	Oldsmobile
15	Brett Bodine	Bud Moore Engineering	Ford
16	Larry Pearson (R)	Pearson Racing	Buick
17	Darrell Waltrip	Hendrick Motorsports	Chevrolet
19	Bill Ingram	Gray Racing	Oldsmobile
21	Neil Bonnett	Wood Brothers Racing	Ford
25	Ken Schrader	Hendrick Motorsports	Chevrolet
26	Ricky Rudd	King Racing	Buick
27	Rusty Wallace	Blue Max Racing	Pontiac
28	Davey Allison	Robert Yates Racing	Ford
29	Dale Jarrett	Cale Yarborough Motorsports	Pontiac
30	Michael Waltrip	Bahari Racing	Pontiac
33	Harry Gant	Jackson Bros. Motorsports	Oldsmobile
38	Dick Johnson	Dick Johnson Racing	Ford
42	Kyle Petty	SABCO Racing	Pontiac
43	Richard Petty	Petty Enterprises	Pontiac
45	Patty Moise	Moise Racing	Buick
50	Mickey Gibbs (R)	Dingman Brothers Racing	Pontiac
52	Jimmy Means	Jimmy Means Racing	Pontiac
55	Phil Parsons	Jackson Bros. Motorsports	Oldsmobile
57	Hut Stricklin (R)	Osterlund Racing	Pontiac
66	Rick Mast (R)	Mach 1 Racing	Chevrolet
71	Dave Marcis	Marcis Auto Racing	Chevrolet
73	Phil Barkdoll	Barkdoll Racing	Oldsmobile
75	Morgan Shepherd	RahMoc Enterprises	Pontiac
82	Mark Stahl	Stahl Racing	Ford
83	Joe Ruttman	Speed Racing	Oldsmobile
84	Dick Trickle (R)	Stavola Brothers Racing	Buick
88	Jimmy Spencer (R)	Baker–Schiff Racing	Pontiac
90	Stan Barrett	Donlavey Racing	Ford
94	Sterling Marlin	Hagan Racing	Oldsmobile

== Qualifying ==
Qualifying was split into two rounds. The first round was held on Thursday, July 27, at 2:00 PM EST. Each driver would have one lap to set a time. During the first round, the top 20 drivers in the round would be guaranteed a starting spot in the race. If a driver was not able to guarantee a spot in the first round, they had the option to scrub their time from the first round and try and run a faster lap time in a second round qualifying run, held on Friday, July 28, at 2:00 PM EST. As with the first round, each driver would have one lap to set a time. For this specific race, positions 21-40 would be decided on time, and depending on who needed it, a select amount of positions were given to cars who had not otherwise qualified but were high enough in owner's points; up to two were given.

Mark Martin, driving for Roush Racing, would win the pole, setting a time of 49.158 and an average speed of 194.800 miles per hour (313.500 km/h) in the first round.

No drivers would fail to qualify.

=== Full qualifying results ===
Pos.	#	Driver	Team	Make	Time	Speed
1	6	Mark Martin	Roush Racing	Ford	49.158	194.800
2	17	Darrell Waltrip	Hendrick Motorsports	Chevrolet	49.346	194.058
3	25	Ken Schrader	Hendrick Motorsports	Chevrolet	49.391	193.881
4	9	Bill Elliott	Melling Racing	Ford	49.581	193.139
5	11	Terry Labonte	Junior Johnson & Associates	Ford	49.613	193.014
6	33	Harry Gant	Jackson Bros. Motorsports	Oldsmobile	49.962	191.666
7	28	Davey Allison	Robert Yates Racing	Ford	49.971	191.631
8	75	Morgan Shepherd	RahMoc Enterprises	Pontiac	50.116	191.077
9	3	Dale Earnhardt	Richard Childress Racing	Chevrolet	50.300	190.378
10	42	Kyle Petty	SABCO Racing	Pontiac	50.427	189.898
11	55	Phil Parsons	Jackson Bros. Motorsports	Oldsmobile	50.459	189.778
12	7	Alan Kulwicki	AK Racing	Ford	50.490	189.661
13	94	Sterling Marlin	Hagan Racing	Oldsmobile	50.636	189.114
14	27	Rusty Wallace	Blue Max Racing	Pontiac	50.661	189.021
15	4	Rick Wilson	Morgan–McClure Motorsports	Oldsmobile	50.664	189.010
16	57	Hut Stricklin (R)	Osterlund Racing	Pontiac	50.666	189.002
17	30	Michael Waltrip	Bahari Racing	Pontiac	50.721	188.798
18	52	Jimmy Means	Jimmy Means Racing	Pontiac	50.729	188.768
19	73	Phil Barkdoll	Barkdoll Racing	Oldsmobile	50.786	188.556
20	10	Derrike Cope	Whitcomb Racing	Pontiac	50.977	187.849
Failed to lock in Round 1
21	21	Neil Bonnett	Wood Brothers Racing	Ford	51.005	187.746
22	14	A. J. Foyt	A. J. Foyt Racing	Oldsmobile	51.012	187.721
23	83	Joe Ruttman	Speed Racing	Oldsmobile	51.083	187.460
24	26	Ricky Rudd	King Racing	Buick	51.177	187.115
25	71	Dave Marcis	Marcis Auto Racing	Chevrolet	51.390	186.340
26	43	Richard Petty	Petty Enterprises	Pontiac	51.394	186.325
27	84	Dick Trickle (R)	Stavola Brothers Racing	Buick	51.399	186.307
28	5	Geoff Bodine	Hendrick Motorsports	Chevrolet	51.483	186.003
29	88	Jimmy Spencer (R)	Baker–Schiff Racing	Pontiac	51.519	185.873
30	19	Bill Ingram	Gray Racing	Oldsmobile	51.641	185.434
31	82	Mark Stahl	Stahl Racing	Ford	51.742	185.072
32	90	Stan Barrett	Donlavey Racing	Ford	51.751	185.040
33	2	Ernie Irvan	U.S. Racing	Pontiac	51.840	184.722
34	50	Mickey Gibbs (R)	Dingman Brothers Racing	Pontiac	51.860	184.651
35	38	Dick Johnson	Dick Johnson Racing	Ford	51.934	184.388
36	45	Patty Moise	Moise Racing	Buick	52.027	184.058
Provisional
37	66	Rick Mast (R)	Mach 1 Racing	Chevrolet	52.240	183.308
To the rear
38	8	Bobby Hillin Jr.	Stavola Brothers Racing	Buick	50.645	189.081
39	16	Larry Pearson (R)	Pearson Racing	Buick	50.723	188.790
40	15	Brett Bodine	Bud Moore Engineering	Ford	50.781	188.574
41	29	Dale Jarrett	Cale Yarborough Motorsports	Pontiac	51.263	186.801
Official first round qualifying results
Official starting lineup

== Race results ==
Fin	St	#	Driver	Team	Make	Laps	Led	Status	Pts	Winnings
1	5	11	Terry Labonte	Junior Johnson & Associates	Ford	188	25	running	180	$73,920
2	2	17	Darrell Waltrip	Hendrick Motorsports	Chevrolet	188	32	running	175	$47,965
3	1	6	Mark Martin	Roush Racing	Ford	188	7	running	170	$37,950
4	3	25	Ken Schrader	Hendrick Motorsports	Chevrolet	188	20	running	165	$28,400
5	15	4	Rick Wilson	Morgan–McClure Motorsports	Oldsmobile	188	0	running	155	$20,200
6	8	75	Morgan Shepherd	RahMoc Enterprises	Pontiac	188	70	running	160	$24,975
7	10	42	Kyle Petty	SABCO Racing	Pontiac	188	0	running	146	$9,250
8	6	33	Harry Gant	Jackson Bros. Motorsports	Oldsmobile	188	0	running	142	$14,850
9	7	28	Davey Allison	Robert Yates Racing	Ford	188	18	running	143	$17,070
10	21	21	Neil Bonnett	Wood Brothers Racing	Ford	188	0	running	134	$13,275
11	9	3	Dale Earnhardt	Richard Childress Racing	Chevrolet	188	0	running	130	$15,020
12	4	9	Bill Elliott	Melling Racing	Ford	187	8	running	132	$17,290
13	16	57	Hut Stricklin (R)	Osterlund Racing	Pontiac	187	0	running	124	$8,560
14	40	15	Brett Bodine	Bud Moore Engineering	Ford	187	0	running	121	$11,087
15	19	73	Phil Barkdoll	Barkdoll Racing	Oldsmobile	187	0	running	118	$6,015
16	27	84	Dick Trickle (R)	Stavola Brothers Racing	Buick	187	0	running	115	$9,395
17	24	26	Ricky Rudd	King Racing	Buick	187	0	running	112	$12,220
18	22	14	A. J. Foyt	A. J. Foyt Racing	Oldsmobile	187	0	running	109	$4,945
19	25	71	Dave Marcis	Marcis Auto Racing	Chevrolet	186	0	running	106	$8,665
20	33	2	Ernie Irvan	U.S. Racing	Pontiac	186	0	running	103	$7,125
21	26	43	Richard Petty	Petty Enterprises	Pontiac	186	0	running	100	$5,770
22	39	16	Larry Pearson (R)	Pearson Racing	Buick	186	0	running	97	$5,440
23	41	29	Dale Jarrett	Cale Yarborough Motorsports	Pontiac	184	0	running	94	$7,235
24	35	38	Dick Johnson	Dick Johnson Racing	Ford	182	0	running	91	$4,105
25	34	50	Mickey Gibbs (R)	Dingman Brothers Racing	Pontiac	182	0	running	88	$4,175
26	30	19	Bill Ingram	Gray Racing	Oldsmobile	181	0	running	85	$3,875
27	31	82	Mark Stahl	Stahl Racing	Ford	176	0	running	82	$3,785
28	13	94	Sterling Marlin	Hagan Racing	Oldsmobile	160	4	running	84	$6,885
29	38	8	Bobby Hillin Jr.	Stavola Brothers Racing	Buick	145	0	crash	76	$6,515
30	12	7	Alan Kulwicki	AK Racing	Ford	145	0	crash	73	$6,395
31	23	83	Joe Ruttman	Speed Racing	Oldsmobile	125	0	crash	0	$6,225
32	37	66	Rick Mast (R)	Mach 1 Racing	Chevrolet	33	0	transmission	67	$3,455
33	36	45	Patty Moise	Moise Racing	Buick	33	0	oil pressure	64	$3,485
34	32	90	Stan Barrett	Donlavey Racing	Ford	27	0	crash	0	$3,340
35	28	5	Geoff Bodine	Hendrick Motorsports	Chevrolet	26	0	crash	58	$10,330
36	17	30	Michael Waltrip	Bahari Racing	Pontiac	26	0	crash	55	$5,925
37	14	27	Rusty Wallace	Blue Max Racing	Pontiac	26	0	crash	52	$12,225
38	20	10	Derrike Cope	Whitcomb Racing	Pontiac	26	0	crash	49	$3,830
39	18	52	Jimmy Means	Jimmy Means Racing	Pontiac	26	4	crash	51	$4,145
40	29	88	Jimmy Spencer (R)	Baker–Schiff Racing	Pontiac	15	0	crash	43	$5,735
41	11	55	Phil Parsons	Jackson Bros. Motorsports	Oldsmobile	6	0	engine	40	$5,710
Official race results

== Standings after the race ==
Drivers' Championship standings

	Pos	Driver	Points
	1	Dale Earnhardt	2,444
1	2	Darrell Waltrip	2,354 (-90)
2	3	Mark Martin	2,318 (-126)
	4	Bill Elliott	2,285 (–159)
3	5	Rusty Wallace	2,279 (–165)
3	6	Terry Labonte	2,164 (–280)
1	7	Davey Allison	2,159 (–285)
2	8	Ken Schrader	2,136 (–308)
1	9	Sterling Marlin	2,079 (–365)
1	10	Ricky Rudd	2,069 (–375)
Official driver's standings

- Note: Only the first 10 positions are included for the driver standings.

Previous race: 1989 AC Spark Plug 500	NASCAR Winston Cup Series; 1989 season	Next race: 1989 The Budweiser at The Glen
