= 1963 Pickens 200 =

Auto race held at Greenville-Pickens Speedway in 1963

Race details
- Race 38 of 55 in the 1963 NASCAR Grand National Series season
- Date: July 30, 1963
- Official name: Pickens 200
- Location: Greenville-Pickens Speedway (Greenville, South Carolina)
- Course: Dirt oval
- Course length: 0.500 miles (0.805 km)
- Distance: 200 laps, 100.000 mi (160.934 km)
- Weather: Warm with temperatures of 80.1 °F (26.7 °C); wind speeds of 6 miles per hour (9.7 km/h)
- Average speed: 62.456 miles per hour (100.513 km/h)
- Attendance: 7,000

Pole position
Driver	Ned Jarrett	Charles Robinson

Most laps led
Driver	Ned Jarrett	Charles Robinson
- Laps: 112

Winner
No. 41	Richard Petty	Petty Enterprises

The 1963 Pickens 200 was a NASCAR Grand National Series event that was held on July 30, 1963, at Greenville-Pickens Speedway in Greenville, South Carolina.

The transition to purpose-built racecars began in the early 1960s and occurred gradually over that decade. Changes made to the sport by the late 1960s brought an end to the "strictly stock" vehicles of the 1950s.

== Race report ==
Three lead changes ended up circulating amongst three different race leaders. Herman Beam, Johnny Divers and Crawford Clements were three of the notable crew chiefs that witnessed the event.

Two cautions were initiated by NASCAR with the average speed of the competitors being 62.456 miles per hour (100.513 km/h). Pole position winner Ned Jarrett would earn the post with a speed of 65.526 miles per hour (105.454 km/h) on his 1963 Ford Galaxie before losing to Richard Petty driving his 1963 Plymouth Belvedere in the actual race. J. D. McDuffie would crash into the wall on his first lap in his 1961 Ford Galaxie vehicle; causing him to become the last-place finisher of the race. Frank Warren would make his NASCAR debut racing against Buck Baker, Neil Castles, Joe Weatherly, Wendell Scott (NASCAR's first African-American competitor), and Cale Yarborough.

This racing event took place on a dirt track oval with 200 laps being the pre-determined number of laps according to the NASCAR officials who sanctioned the event.

=== Qualifying ===
Grid	No.	Driver	Manufacturer	Owner
1	11	Ned Jarrett	'63 Ford	Charles Robinson
2	5	Billy Wade	'62 Dodge	Cotton Owens
3	32	Tiny Lund	'63 Ford	Dave Kent
4	6	David Pearson	'63 Dodge	Cotton Owens
5	87	Buck Baker	'63 Pontiac	Buck Baker
6	99	Bobby Isaac	'63 Ford	Bondy Long
7	41	Richard Petty	'63 Plymouth	Petty Enterprises
8	18	Stick Elliott	'62 Pontiac	Toy Bolton
9	48	Jack Smith	'63 Dodge	Jack Smith
10	75	Bunkie Blackburn	'62 Pontiac	Robert Smith
11	2	Fred Harb	'62 Pontiac	Cliff Stewart
12	05	Joe Weatherly	'62 Pontiac	Possum Jones
13	19	Cale Yarborough	'62 Ford	Herman Beam
14	1	E.J. Trivette	'62 Chevrolet	Jess Potter
15	54	Jimmy Pardue	'63 Ford	Pete Stewart
16	34	Wendell Scott	'62 Chevrolet	Wendell Scott
17	86	Neil Castles	'62 Chrysler	Buck Baker
18	89	Curtis Crider	'62 Pontiac	Joel Davis
19	56	Ed Livingston	'62 Ford	Mamie Reynolds
20	X	Frank Warren	'61 Pontiac	unknown
21	76	J.D. McDuffie	'61 Ford	J.D. McDuffie

== Timeline ==
Section reference:

- Start of race: Ned Jarrett started the race with the pole position while J.D. McDuffie's vehicle suffered from a terminal crash.
- Lap 10: Jack Smith's vehicle overheated, causing him to withdraw from the race.
- Lap 23: Bunkie Blackburn's engine came to a screeching halt; Billy Wade developed problems with his vehicle's differential.
- Lap 70: David Pearson takes over the lead from Ned Jarrett.
- Lap 71: Stick Elliott's V-gasket became problematic, causing him to leave the race.
- Lap 90: Curtis Crider's fuel pump developed problems, forcing him out of the race.
- Lap 106: Ned Jarrett takes over the lead from David Pearson.
- Lap 149: Richard Petty takes over the lead from Ned Jarrett.
- Lap 172: Neil Castles' vehicle had its spindle become problematic, forcing him to withdraw from the event.
- Finish: Richard Petty was officially declared the winner of the event.

== Finishing order ==
Section reference:

1. Richard Petty (No. 41)
2. Ned Jarrett (No. 11)
3. Buck Baker (No. 87)
4. Fred Harb (No. 2)
5. Bobby Isaac (No. 99)
6. David Pearson (No. 6)
7. Tiny Lund (No. 32)
8. Joe Weatherly (No.05)
9. Frank Warren (No. X)
10. Wendell Scott (No. 34)
11. Ed Livingston (No. 56)
12. Jimmy Pardue (No. 54)
13. E.J. Trivette (No. 1)
14. Neil Castles (No. 86)
15. Cale Yarborough (No. 19)
16. Curtis Crider (No. 89)
17. Stick Elliott (No. 18)
18. Billy Wade (No. 5)
19. Bunkie Blackburn (No. 75)
20. Jack Smith (No. 48)
21. J.D. McDuffie (No. 76)

Preceded by 1963 Volunteer 500	NASCAR Grand National Series Season; 1963	Succeeded by 1963 Nashville 400

Preceded by 1963 untitled race at Bridgehampton Raceway	Richard Petty's Career Wins; 1960-1984	Succeeded by 1963 Sandlapper 200
