= Jeff McDuffie =

American racing driver (1962–2024)

- Born: Jeffrey W. McDuffie Sr. March 31, 1962; Sanford, North Carolina, U.S.
- Died: October 25, 2024 (aged 62)

NASCAR Cup Series career
- 5 races run over 4 years
- Best finish: 53rd (1980)
- First race: 1980 Northwestern Bank 400 (North Wilkesboro)
- Last race: 1985 Nationwise 500 (Rockingham)
Wins	Top tens	Poles
0	0	0

Jeffrey W. McDuffie Sr. (born March 31, 1962 – October 25, 2024) was an American professional stock car racing driver who has previously competed in the NASCAR Winston Cup Series, where he ran five races from 1980 to 1988, getting a best finish of sixteenth at North Wilkesboro Speedway in 1982. He was the son of the late J. D. McDuffie, who also competed in the Cup Series.

McDuffie died in his sleep on October 25, 2024.

== Motorsports career results ==
=== NASCAR ===
(key) (Bold - Pole position awarded by qualifying time. Italics - Pole position earned by points standings or practice time. * – Most laps led.)

==== Winston Cup Series ====
NASCAR Winston Cup Series results
Year	Team	No.	Make	1	2	3	4	5	6	7	8	9	10	11	12	13	14	15	16	17	18	19	20	21	22	23	24	25	26	27	28	29	30	31	NWCC	Pts	Ref
1980	McDuffie Racing	07	Buick	RSD	DAY	RCH	CAR	ATL	BRI	DAR	NWS; 18	MAR	TAL	NSV	DOV	CLT	TWS	RSD	MCH	DAY	NSV	POC	TAL	MCH	BRI	DAR	RCH	DOV	NWS; 17	MAR	CLT	CAR; 19	ATL	ONT	53rd	327	
1982	McDuffie Racing	7	Pontiac	DAY	RCH	BRI	ATL	CAR	DAR	NWS	MAR	TAL	NSV	DOV	CLT	POC	RSD	MCH	DAY	NSV	POC	TAL	MCH	BRI	DAR	RCH	DOV	NWS; 16	CLT; DNQ	MAR	CAR	ATL	RSD		80th	115	
1985	McDuffie Racing	0	Pontiac	DAY	RCH	CAR	ATL	BRI	DAR	NWS	MAR	TAL	DOV	CLT	RSD	POC	MCH	DAY	POC	TAL	MCH	BRI	DAR	RCH	DOV	MAR	NWS	CLT	CAR; 23	ATL	RSD				N/A	0	
1988	McDuffie Racing	70	Pontiac	DAY	RCH	CAR	ATL	DAR	BRI	NWS; DNQ	MAR	TAL	CLT	DOV	RSD	POC	MCH	DAY	POC	TAL	GLN	MCH	BRI	DAR	RCH	DOV	MAR	CLT	NWS	CAR	PHO	ATL			N/A	0	
