= J. D. McDuffie =

American racing driver (1938–1991)

- McDuffie c. 1970
- Born: John Delphus McDuffie Jr. December 5, 1938; Upper Little River Township, North Carolina, U.S.
- Died: August 11, 1991 (aged 52); Watkins Glen, New York, U.S.
- Cause of death: Basilar skull fracture

NASCAR Cup Series career
- 653 races run over 27 years
- Best finish: 9th (1971)
- First race: 1963 Speedorama 200 (Myrtle Beach)
- Last race: 1991 Budweiser at The Glen (Watkins Glen)
Wins	Top tens	Poles
0	106	1

John Delphus McDuffie Jr. (December 5, 1938 – August 11, 1991) was an American racing driver. He competed in the NASCAR Winston Cup Series from 1963 to 1991, collecting 106 Top 10 finishes during his career, despite never finishing on the lead lap of any race in his career, and holding the record for the most starts in NASCAR's top level without a win with 653. He died in a racing accident during the Budweiser at The Glen at Watkins Glen International in 1991.

== Career ==
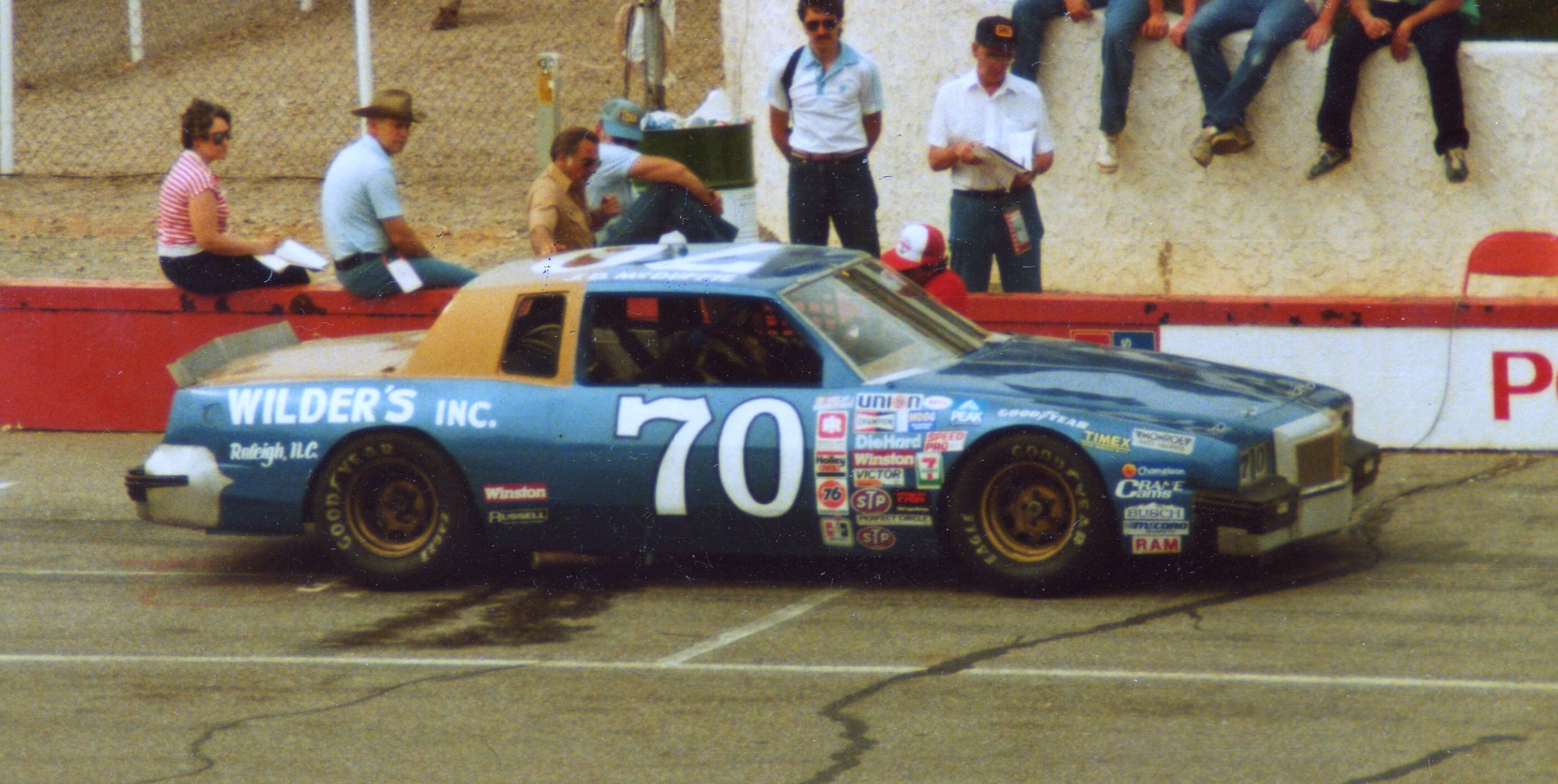
McDuffie's No. 70 at Pocono Raceway in 1984

After attending his first race in Bowman Gray Stadium at the age of ten, McDuffie was inspired by racers Curtis Turner, Glen Wood, Billy Myers, and others to become a race car driver.

McDuffie's racing career started in dirt track racing. He picked the No. 70 early on because it was easy to paint and easy to remember.

McDuffie won several small races throughout the Carolinas including a track championship at a small dirt track near Rockingham, North Carolina. He made his NASCAR Grand National (now NASCAR Cup Series) debut in 1963 at the Myrtle Beach Speedway near Myrtle Beach, South Carolina driving Curtis Turner’s old 1961 Ford. Though McDuffie was an expert dirt track racer, he never had similar success in NASCAR's premiership. His best NASCAR finish came at the Albany-Saratoga Speedway, in 1971, where he managed to finish third. Meanwhile, his first last-place finish came at the 1963 Pickens 200. In 1978, McDuffie won the pole position for the Delaware 500, his only pole position in Winston Cup competition. Normally a low-budget independent, McDuffie entered into a partnership with Donald Magnum and purchased a chassis from Richard Childress Racing. McDuffie in 1982 also made a start in the final race of the season at Riverside in Junior Johnson's second car, which was entered to protect Darrell Waltrip, who was on his way to winning that season's championship; If Waltrip had an accident in practice or qualifying, McDuffie could relinquish the second car to him and Waltrip would not jeopardize his championship hopes by missing the race.

In the 1988 Daytona 500 qualifying race, McDuffie received second- and third-degree burns in an accident after he raced without fireproof gloves (a practice no longer permitted in NASCAR) because they were stolen before the race.

One day before his fatal accident at Watkins Glen International, McDuffie won a celebrity race in Owego, New York, at the Shangri-La Speedway, not far from Watkins Glen.

McDuffie is still the record holder for the most starts in NASCAR's top touring series without recording a win. His 653 starts rank him 22nd all-time through the end of 2018. McDuffie held the series record for the most last-place finishes with 32 until Joe Nemechek surpassed him in 2014.

In 2016, Front Row Motorsports and Landon Cassill honored McDuffie with a tribute paint scheme during the throwback weekend at Darlington Raceway complete with sponsors that sponsored McDuffie's racing effort.

== Death ==
McDuffie was involved in an accident on the fifth lap of the 1991 Budweiser at The Glen race at Watkins Glen International. On the straight between the esses (Turns 2-3-4) and the Loop-Chute (Turn 5), at 170 mph, McDuffie collided with Jimmy Means after suffering a mechanical failure. McDuffie's left front wheel spindle broke off the car, causing him to lose brakes and hit Means in the right front. This left him no way of stopping the car or steering it; and to further complicate matters, there was no gravel trap in the corner that McDuffie was headed toward. As a result, McDuffie skidded across the grass and hit the Armco outside retaining wall and tire barrier with such force that the car rebounded into the air, rotated 180 degrees, and then came to rest upside-down. Means also crashed into the same corner but was able to slow his vehicle down before the impact; his car collided into the same section of retaining wall as McDuffie's car rotated in mid-air. Means, a fellow independent racer, suffered only minor cuts and bruises in the accident, and got out of his car to check on McDuffie.

After peering into McDuffie's car, Means began frantically signaling for assistance, later saying, "It was so bad that I just had to close my eyes." A host of medical personnel and track workers rushed to the scene. The race was delayed for one hour and forty-eight minutes as McDuffie was removed from his car and his Pontiac was removed from the infield. Also, the wall that McDuffie and Means struck had to be repaired. As the cars got back on the track and cruised under yellow flag conditions, the media attention turned to Chip Williams, NASCAR's PR director, who disclosed that McDuffie had died instantly from head and brain injuries. NASCAR declined to investigate the accident, and McDuffie's car left the track before the conclusion of the race.

McDuffie's basilar skull fracture was presumed to have been caused by rapid head movement to his right rather than an impact. McDuffie's family and crew members have long believed that his injuries were caused by a foreign object entering the vehicle. McDuffie's sponsor, Medford Speed, hired accident investigators, Phil Moser and Terry Shaw, to determine the cause of the fatal injuries. The investigation concluded that upon impact with the tire barrier, a tire from the barrier entered the cockpit through the passenger side window and struck McDuffie on the right side of his head near the jaw, causing his fatal head injuries. The report cited a "black tar-like substance" on the window and damage to McDuffie's helmet foam and microphone tab that was consistent with a tire from the barrier entering the car upon impact.

McDuffie's death led to changes at Watkins Glen and also influenced motorsport safety changes that would come to full fruition at the end of the decade. Six weeks earlier, Camel GT prototype driver Tommy Kendall had a hard crash in the same section during the Camel Continental VIII, when a wheel failed on his Pratt & Miller Intrepid RM-1-Chevrolet prototype, sliding into the barrier, breaking both his legs and sidelining him for the rest of the 1991 season, including the Winston Cup race, where he was set to substitute for Kyle Petty, injured at Talladega in May (Kendall had substituted for Petty at Sears Point earlier in the year). The track was then given a bus stop chicane placed slightly before the entrance of turn five, the section of track in question, and a gravel trap (since paved over after research into motorsport safety proved the advantage of a tarmac runoff), for the 1992 season.

Also, at the time, basilar skull fractures were the subject of developing research by Jim Downing and Bob Hubbard into a head and neck restraint for motorsport. Downing, a champion sports car racer, and his brother-in-law Hubbard, were in the process of developing the HANS device, which had just begun production. McDuffie's death was among the catalysts that led to increased funding by the automakers to continue research into basilar skull fractures as part of motorsport safety improvements, as adoption by sports car drivers of HANS had increased. By the end of the decade, following two CART fatalities in one season and three NASCAR fatalities in a span of five months, and then the start of the next decade with two more fatalities (including that of Dale Earnhardt, Sr.), and research into the head and neck restraints that had quickly been adopted, most motorsport sanctioning bodies mandated head and neck restraints worldwide.

McDuffie's widow, Ima Jean, unsuccessfully sued Watkins Glen for $4.25 million, claiming the barrier McDuffie hit was unsafe. The judge in that case ruled that McDuffie was familiar enough with the track to be aware of the dangers and that mechanical failure caused the accident. The cause of the mechanical failure was never explained as NASCAR did a very brief investigation and the wheel that broke off disappeared before it could be returned to the McDuffie family. From McDuffie's death in 1991 to 2001, notable stock car drivers such as Dale Earnhardt, Adam Petty, Blaise Alexander, and Kenny Irwin Jr. would also die from crashes that caused basilar skull fractures. Research into head and neck restraints would lead to the development of devices such as the HANS device and the Hutchens device. In modern times most motorsport sanctioning bodies worldwide (including NASCAR), mandate drivers to use head and neck restraints. However it wasn't until October 2001, more than ten years after McDuffie's death, that NASCAR mandated that all drivers wear head and neck restraints in the form of a HANS device or a Hutchens device. In January 2005 NASCAR banned the use of the Hutchens device and forced all drivers to use the HANS device instead.

== Personal life ==
McDuffie made Sanford, North Carolina home; the city supported him through struggles much like it did with hometown driver Herb Thomas. McDuffie married Ima Jean Wood in 1959 and together they had two children, Jeff and Linda.

McDuffie is buried at Buffalo Cemetery, Sanford, North Carolina. On August 8, 2021, Ima Jean died at age 83. On October 25, 2024, Jeff died at the age of 62.

He was not related to Paul McDuffie.

== Motorsports career results ==
=== NASCAR ===
(key) (Bold – Pole position awarded by qualifying time. Italics – Pole position earned by points standings or practice time. * – Most laps led.)

==== Grand National Series ====
NASCAR Grand National Series results
Year	Team	No.	Make	1	2	3	4	5	6	7	8	9	10	11	12	13	14	15	16	17	18	19	20	21	22	23	24	25	26	27	28	29	30	31	32	33	34	35	36	37	38	39	40	41	42	43	44	45	46	47	48	49	50	51	52	53	54	55	NGNC	Pts	Ref
1963	McDuffie Racing	X	Ford	BIR	GGS	THS	RSD	DAY	DAY	DAY	PIF	AWS	HBO	ATL	HCY	BRI	AUG	RCH	GPS	SBO	BGS	MAR	NWS	CLB	THS	DAR	ODS	RCH	CLT	BIR	ATL	DAY	MBS; 12	SVH	DTS; 12	BGS																							46th	2498	
1963	McDuffie Racing	76	Ford																																		ASH; 8	OBS	BRR	BRI; 19	GPS; 21	NSV	CLB; 14	AWS	PIF	BGS; 12	ONA	DAR	HCY; 8	RCH	MAR; 29	DTS; 12	NWS	THS; 10	CLT	SBO	HBO; 18	RSD	46th	2498	
1966	McDuffie Racing	70	Ford	AUG	RSD	DAY	DAY	DAY	CAR; 16	BRI; 17	ATL	HCY; 7	CLB; 14	GPS; 18	BGS; 10	NWS; 7	MAR; 25	DAR; DNQ	LGY	MGR	MON; 11	RCH; 13	CLT	DTS; 8	ASH; 8	PIF; 5	SMR; 21	AWS; 13	BLV; 14	GPS; 6	DAY; 21	ODS; 13	BRR; 17	OXF; 18	FON; 7	ISP; 21	BRI; 14	SMR; 19	NSV; 23	ATL; 22	CLB; 12	AWS; 24	BLV; 11	BGS; 8	DAR	HCY; 15	RCH; 24	HBO; 23	MAR; 22	NWS; DNQ	CLT	CAR; 26							27th	9572	
1967	McDuffie Racing	70	Ford	AUG; 18	RSD	DAY	DAY	DAY	AWS	BRI	GPS	BGS	ATL	CLB	HCY	NWS	MAR	SVH	RCH	DAR	BLV	LGY	CLT	ASH	MGR	SMR	BIR	CAR	GPS	MGY	DAY	TRN	OXF	FDA	ISP	BRI	SMR	NSV	ATL	BGS	CLB	SVH	DAR	HCY	RCH	BLV	HBO	MAR	NWS	CLT	CAR	AWS							NA	0	
1968	McDuffie Racing	70	Buick	MGR	MGY	RSD	DAY	BRI	RCH	ATL	HCY	GPS	CLB	NWS	MAR; 25	AUG; 16	AWS; 19	DAR	BLV; 15	LGY	CLT	ASH; 8	MGR; 9	SMR	BIR	CAR; 7	GPS; 6	DAY; 37	ISP; 19	OXF; 9	FDA; 15	TRN; 19	BRI; 10	SMR; 10	NSV; 11	ATL; 40	CLB; 15	BGS; 16	AWS; 25	SBO; 12	LGY; 11	DAR; 42	HCY; 18	RCH; 28	BLV; 8	HBO; 15	MAR; 16	NWS; 30	AUG; 9	CLT	CAR; 35	JFC; 13							24th	1370	
1969	McDuffie Racing	70	Buick	MGR; 30	MGY; 13	RSD; 29	DAY	DAY; 18	DAY; 39	CAR; 29	AUG; 22	BRI; 30	ATL; 16	CLB; 16	HCY; 10	GPS; 16	RCH; 6	NWS; 13	MAR; 14	AWS; 9	DAR; 25	BLV; 19	LGY; 11	CLT; 15	MGR; 10	SMR; 8	MCH; 13	KPT; 15	GPS; 6	NCF; 11		DOV; 12	TPN; 11	TRN; 26	BLV; 9	BRI; 9	NSV; 9	SMR; 13	ATL; 23	MCH; 28	SBO; 12	BGS; 8	AWS; 13	DAR; 25	HCY; 12	RCH; 25	TAL; DNQ	CLB; 7	MAR; DNQ			SVH; 10	AUG; 29		JFC; 13	MGR	TWS		14th	2741	
1969	E.C. Reid	09	Chevy																												DAY; 40																												14th	2741	
1969	Don Tarr	0	Chevy																																														MAR; 36					CAR; 20					14th	2741	
1969	GC Spencer Racing	8	Plymouth																																															NWS; 12									14th	2741	
1969	Langley Racing	84	Ford																																																CLT; 24								14th	2741	
1970	McDuffie Racing	70	Buick	RSD	DAY	DAY; 31	DAY; DNQ	RCH; 11	CAR; 13	SVH; 11	ATL; 30	BRI; 6		NWS; DNQ	CLB; 8	DAR	BLV; 10	LGY; 16		SMR; 11	MAR; 21	MCH	RSD	HCY	KPT; 7	GPS; 12									CLB; 23	ONA	MCH								NCF; 19														16th	2079	
1970	McDuffie Racing	70	Ford										TAL; DNQ														DAY; 16																																16th	2079	
1970	McDuffie Racing	70	Mercury																CLT; 21									AST; 23	TPN; 11	TRN; 23	BRI; 9	SMR; 21	NSV; 5					TAL; 41	BGS; 7	SBO; 7	DAR; 26	HCY; 11	RCH; 15	DOV; 25		NWS; 21	CLT; 15	MAR; 10	MGR	CAR; 18	LGY; 8								16th	2079	
1970	Ken Spikes	16	Chevy																															ATL; 39																									16th	2079	
1971	McDuffie Racing	70	Mercury	RSD; 15	DAY	DAY; 30	DAY; DNQ	ONT; 35									NWS; 20	MAR; 19	DAR; 7		TAL; 33	ASH; 7		CLT; 24	DOV; 12	MCH; 25	RSD; 14	HOU; 10	GPS; 24	DAY; 35	BRI; 9	AST; 3	ISP; 16	TRN; 17	NSV; 5	ATL; 17	BGS; 13	ONA; 12	MCH; 18	TAL; 21	CLB; 19	HCY	DAR; DNQ	MAR; 30		DOV; 26	CAR; 24				TWS; 19								9th	2862	
1971	McDuffie Racing	70	Buick						RCH; 20																																																		9th	2862	
1971	Lubinski Racing	88	Dodge							CAR; 14	HCY																																																9th	2862	
1971	McDuffie Racing	70	Chevy									BRI; 30	ATL; 25	CLB; 15	GPS	SMR; 18				SBO; 7			KPT; 24																									MGR; 7	RCH; 19	NWS; 15									9th	2862	
1971	Junior Fields	91	Chevy																																								DAR; 40																9th	2862	
1971	Williams Racing	47	Ford																																										CLT; 22														9th	2862	

==== Winston Cup Series ====
NASCAR Winston Cup Series results
Year	Team	No.	Make	1	2	3	4	5	6	7	8	9	10	11	12	13	14	15	16	17	18	19	20	21	22	23	24	25	26	27	28	29	30	31	NWCC	Pts	Ref
1972	McDuffie Racing	70	Chevy	RSD; 18	DAY; 24	RCH; 12	ONT; 23	CAR; DNQ	ATL; DNQ	BRI; 19	DAR; 19	NWS; 25	MAR; 13	TAL; 34	CLT; 33	DOV; 11	MCH; 16	RSD; 28	TWS; 27	DAY; 28		TRN; 16	ATL; DNQ	TAL; 36	MCH; 29	NSV; 10	DAR; DNQ		DOV; 24	MAR; 14	NWS; 23	CLT; DNQ	CAR; 24	TWS; 14	18th	5075.85	
1972	Don Tarr	70	Dodge																		BRI; 5														18th	5075.85	
1972	George Altheide	0	Dodge																								DAR; 15								18th	5075.85	
1972	Faustina Racing	5	Plymouth																									RCH; 30							18th	5075.85	
1973	McDuffie Racing	70	Chevy	RSD; 32	DAY; 26	RCH; 29	CAR; 29	BRI; 21	ATL	NWS; 23	DAR; 5	MAR; 13	TAL; 18	NSV; 9	CLT; 21	DOV; 19	TWS; 10	RSD; 12	MCH; 10	DAY; 40	BRI; 5	ATL; 7	TAL; 11	NSV; 18	DAR; 10	RCH; 29	DOV; 5	NWS; 10	MAR; 10	CLT; 29	CAR; 20				10th	5743.9	
1974	McDuffie Racing	70	Chevy	RSD; 22	DAY; 28	RCH; 7	CAR; 13	BRI; 12	ATL; 15	DAR; 30	NWS; 8	MAR; 9	TAL; 19	NSV; 7	DOV; 11	CLT; 10	RSD; 17	MCH; 17	DAY; 11	BRI; 11	NSV; 27	ATL; 19	POC; 25	TAL; 24	MCH; 13	DAR; 17	RCH; 8	DOV; 12	NWS; 23	MAR; 16	CLT; 21	CAR; 19	ONT; 10		12th	920.85	
1975	McDuffie Racing	70	Chevy	RSD; 14	DAY; 33	RCH	CAR	BRI	ATL	NWS; 13	DAR; 11	MAR; 28	TAL; 29	NSV; 11	DOV; 18	CLT; 11	RSD; 6	MCH; 18	DAY; 22	NSV; 9	POC; 27	TAL; 45	MCH; 28	DAR; 33	DOV; 8	NWS; 7	MAR; 30	CLT; 9	RCH; 5	CAR; 20	BRI; 30	ATL; 18	ONT; 21		18th	2745	
1976	McDuffie Racing	70	Chevy	RSD; 19	DAY; 7	CAR; 10	RCH; 21	BRI; 10	ATL; 27	NWS; 5	DAR; 27	MAR; 23	TAL; 27	NSV; 20	DOV; 15	CLT; 25	RSD; 14	MCH; 16	DAY; 24	NSV; 13	POC; 21	TAL; 7	MCH; 8	BRI; 23	DAR; 25	RCH; 11	DOV; 7	MAR; 21	NWS; 7	CLT; 23		ATL; 13	ONT; 11		12th	3400	
1976	Handy Racing	33	Chevy																												CAR; 26				12th	3400	
1977	McDuffie Racing	70	Chevy	RSD; 29	DAY; 13	RCH; 16	CAR; 15	ATL; 31	NWS; 22	DAR; 19	BRI; 20	MAR; 9	TAL; 26	NSV; 24	DOV; 13	CLT; 25	RSD; 33	MCH; 20	DAY; 24	NSV; 8	POC; 14	TAL; 8	MCH; 20	BRI; 18	DAR; 12	RCH; 13	DOV; 12	MAR; 17	NWS; 23	CLT; 15	CAR; 10	ATL; 27	ONT; 20		12th	3236	
1978	McDuffie Racing	70	Chevy	RSD; 28	DAY; 30	RCH; 27	CAR; 25	ATL; 16	BRI; 28	DAR; 11	NWS; 7	MAR; 26	TAL; 40	DOV; 34	CLT; 22	NSV; 12	RSD; 24	MCH; 13	DAY; 12	NSV; 5	POC; 10	TAL; 17	MCH; 7	BRI; 8	DAR; 20	RCH; 8	**DOV**; 33	MAR; 22	NWS; 11	CLT; 11	CAR; 12	ATL; 14	ONT; 26		11th	3255	
1979	McDuffie Racing	70	Chevy	RSD; 17		CAR; 25	RCH; 7		NWS; 6	BRI; 26	DAR; 19	MAR; 10	TAL; 31	NSV; 5	DOV; 13	CLT; 13	TWS; 14	RSD; 7	MCH; 14	DAY; 21	NSV; 8	POC; 13	TAL; 18	MCH; 9	BRI; 26	DAR; 18	RCH; 14	DOV; 27	MAR; 21	CLT; 22	NWS; 28	CAR; 25	ATL; 12	ONT; 31	13th	3473	
1979	McDuffie Racing	70	Olds		DAY; 25			ATL; 17																											13th	3473	
1980	McDuffie Racing	70	Chevy	RSD; 15		RCH; 9	CAR; 32	ATL; 9	BRI; 13	DAR; 22	NWS; 30	MAR; 30		NSV; 20	DOV; 33		TWS; 29	RSD; 9	MCH; 15		NSV; 11	POC; 36		MCH; 20	BRI; 11	DAR; 18	RCH; 29	DOV; 38	NWS; 24	MAR; 26	CLT; 20	CAR; 21	ATL; 17	ONT; 14	16th	2968	
1980	McDuffie Racing	70	Buick		DAY; DNQ								TAL; 41							DAY; 23			TAL; 25												16th	2968	
1980	Gray Racing	19	Buick		DAY; 27																														16th	2968	
1980	Ulrich Racing	40	Chevy													CLT; 30																			16th	2968	
1981	McDuffie Racing	70	Chevy	RSD; 23																															17th	2996	
1981	McDuffie Racing	70	Pontiac		DAY; 24	RCH; 10	CAR; 33	ATL; 11	BRI; 22	NWS; 16	DAR; 16	MAR; 30	TAL; 22	NSV; 16	DOV; 23	CLT; 13	TWS; 11	RSD; 12	MCH; 22	DAY; 12	NSV; 20	POC; 18	TAL	MCH; 16	BRI; 13	DAR; 21	RCH	DOV; 28	MAR	NWS; 12	CLT; 17	CAR; 30	ATL; 23	RSD; 11	17th	2996	
1982	McDuffie Racing	70	Pontiac	DAY; 13	RCH; 23	BRI; 19	ATL; 38	CAR; 10	DAR; 36	NWS; 20	MAR; 16	TAL; 18	NSV; 18	DOV; 27	CLT; 33	POC; 33	RSD; 25	MCH; 37	DAY; 11	NSV; 25	POC; 16	TAL; 22	MCH; 16	BRI; 22	DAR; 16	RCH; 30	DOV; 13	NWS; 30	CLT; 18	MAR; DNQ	CAR; 22	ATL; 30			19th	2886	
1982	Gordon Racing	24	Buick																											MAR; 15					19th	2886	
1982	Junior Johnson & Associates	70	Buick																														RSD; 18		19th	2886	
1983	McDuffie Racing	70	Pontiac	DAY; 29	RCH; 25	CAR; 30		DAR; 17	NWS; DNQ	MAR	TAL; DNQ	NSV; 18	DOV; 23	BRI; 24	CLT; 26	RSD; 24	POC; 19	MCH; 34	DAY	NSV; 17	POC; 25	TAL; 23	MCH; 32	BRI; 25	DAR; 37	RCH; 11	DOV; 36	MAR; 13	NWS; 26	CLT; DNQ	CAR; 14	ATL; 32	RSD; 30		26th	2197	
1983	Gray Racing	19	Buick				ATL; 36																												26th	2197	
1984	McDuffie Racing	70	Pontiac	DAY; DNQ	RCH; 23	CAR; 16	ATL	BRI; 21	NWS; 24	DAR	MAR	TAL	NSV; 26	DOV; 33	CLT	RSD	POC; 39	MCH; DNQ	DAY	NSV; DNQ	POC; 31	TAL; DNQ	MCH; DNQ	BRI; 12	DAR; 24	RCH; 28	DOV; 16	MAR; 25	CLT; DNQ	NWS; 30	CAR; 36	ATL; DNQ	RSD; 30		34th	1366	
1985	McDuffie Racing	70	Chevy	DAY; DNQ			ATL; 23											DAY; 20		TAL; 28		BRI; DNQ	DAR; DNQ						CAR; 26						27th	1853	
1985	McDuffie Racing	70	Pontiac		RCH; 20	CAR; 28		BRI; 27	DAR; 39	NWS; 24	MAR; 24	TAL; 15		CLT; 39	RSD; 42	POC; 25	MCH; 31				MCH; 29			RCH; 26		MAR; 15	NWS; DNQ	CLT		ATL; 27	RSD; 25				27th	1853	
1985	McDuffie Racing	70	Ford										DOV; 31						POC; 40																27th	1853	
1985	Beahr Racing	70	Ford																						DOV; 28										27th	1853	
1986	McDuffie Racing	70	Pontiac	DAY; DNQ	RCH; 16	CAR; 31	ATL	BRI; DNQ	DAR; 17	NWS; 28	MAR; 18	TAL; DNQ	DOV; 20	CLT; DNQ	RSD; 14	POC; 16	MCH; 35	DAY; DNQ	POC; 19	TAL; DNQ	GLN; 25	MCH; 31	BRI; 24	DAR; 34											26th	1825	
1986	Winkle Motorsports	70	Pontiac																						RCH; 28	DOV; 37	MAR; 20	NWS; 26	CLT; 20	CAR; 21	ATL; DNQ	RSD			26th	1825	
1987	Winkle Motorsports	70	Pontiac	DAY; 25	CAR; 20	RCH; 16																													30th	1361	
1987	McDuffie Racing	70	Pontiac				ATL; 40	DAR; 41	NWS; 32	BRI; 21	MAR; 31	TAL	CLT; DNQ	DOV; 23	POC; 28	RSD; 37	MCH; DNQ	DAY; DNQ	POC; DNQ	TAL; 25	GLN; 24	MCH; 22	BRI; DNQ	DAR	RCH; DNQ	DOV; 28	MAR; 17	NWS; DNQ	CLT; DNQ	CAR; 40	RSD	ATL; DNQ			30th	1361	
1988	McDuffie Racing	70	Pontiac	DAY; DNQ	RCH	CAR	ATL	DAR	BRI	NWS	MAR	TAL	CLT; DNQ	DOV; 25	RSD	POC; DNQ	MCH; DNQ	DAY	POC; DNQ	TAL; DNQ	GLN; 36	MCH; DNQ	BRI; DNQ	DAR	RCH; DNQ	DOV; DNQ	MAR; DNQ	CLT; DNQ	NWS; DNQ	CAR; DNQ	PHO	ATL			61st	148	
1989	McDuffie Racing	70	Pontiac	DAY; 24	CAR; 37	ATL; DNQ	RCH; DNQ	DAR; 31	BRI; DNQ	NWS; DNQ	MAR; DNQ	TAL; DNQ	CLT	DOV	SON	POC	MCH	DAY; DNQ	POC; DNQ	TAL; DNQ	GLN; 35	MCH; DNQ	BRI	DAR; 36	RCH; 31	DOV; 34	MAR; DNQ	CLT; DNQ	NWS	CAR; DNQ	PHO	ATL; DNQ			44th	457	
1990	McDuffie Racing	70	Pontiac	DAY; DNQ	RCH; DNQ	CAR; 35	ATL; DNQ	DAR; 35	BRI; 27	NWS; DNQ	MAR	TAL; DNQ	CLT; DNQ	DOV; 25	SON	POC; 28	MCH; 37	DAY; DNQ	POC; DNQ	TAL; DNQ	GLN; 22	MCH; DNQ	BRI; DNQ	DAR; DNQ	RCH; DNQ	DOV; 40	MAR; DNQ	NWS; DNQ	CLT; DNQ	CAR; DNQ	PHO	ATL			40th	557	
1991	McDuffie Racing	70	Pontiac	DAY; DNQ	RCH; DNQ	CAR; DNQ	ATL	DAR; 30	BRI; DNQ	NWS; DNQ	MAR; DNQ	TAL; DNQ	CLT; DNQ	DOV; 31	SON	POC; 34	MCH; DNQ	DAY; DNQ	POC; 25	TAL	GLN; 40	MCH	BRI	DAR	RCH	DOV	MAR	NWS	CLT	CAR	PHO	ATL			48th	335	

===== Daytona 500 =====
Year	Team	Manufacturer	Start	Finish
1969	McDuffie Racing	Buick	36	39
1970	McDuffie Racing	Buick	DNQ	
1971	McDuffie Racing	Mercury	DNQ	
1972	McDuffie Racing	Chevrolet	19	24
1973	McDuffie Racing	Chevrolet	22	26
1974	McDuffie Racing	Chevrolet	30	28
1975	McDuffie Racing	Chevrolet	14	33
1976	McDuffie Racing	Chevrolet	41	7
1977	McDuffie Racing	Chevrolet	24	13
1978	McDuffie Racing	Chevrolet	22	30
1979	McDuffie Racing	Oldsmobile	29	25
1980	McDuffie Racing	Buick	DNQ	
1980	Gray Racing	Buick	25	27
1981	McDuffie Racing	Pontiac	41	24
1982	McDuffie Racing	Pontiac	33	13
1983	McDuffie Racing	Pontiac	37	29
1984	McDuffie Racing	Pontiac	DNQ	
1985	McDuffie Racing	Chevrolet	DNQ	
1986	McDuffie Racing	Pontiac	DNQ	
1987	Winkle Motorsports	Pontiac	38	25
1988	McDuffie Racing	Pontiac	DNQ	
1989	McDuffie Racing	Pontiac	29	24
1990	McDuffie Racing	Pontiac	DNQ	
1991	McDuffie Racing	Pontiac	DNQ	

==== Busch Series ====
NASCAR Busch Series results
Year	Team	No.	Make	1	2	3	4	5	6	7	8	9	10	11	12	13	14	15	16	17	18	19	20	21	22	23	24	25	26	27	28	29	30	31	32	33	34	35	NBSC	Pts	Ref
1982	McDuffie Racing	70	Pontiac	DAY	RCH	BRI	MAR	DAR; 16	HCY	SBO	CRW	RCH	LGY	DOV; 16	HCY	CLT; 21	ASH	HCY	SBO	CAR; 21	CRW	SBO	HCY	LGY	IRP	BRI	HCY	RCH	MAR	CLT; 15	HCY	MAR							44th	548	
1983		03	Chevy	DAY; 19	RCH	CAR; 32	HCY	MAR	NWS	SBO	GPS	LGY	DOV; 15	BRI	CLT; 14	SBO	HCY	ROU	SBO	ROU	CRW	ROU	SBO	HCY	LGY	IRP	GPS	BRI	HCY										44th	542	
1983		03	Pontiac																											DAR; 11	RCH	NWS	SBO	MAR	ROU	CLT	HCY	MAR	44th	542	
1984		72	Olds	DAY	RCH	CAR	HCY	MAR	DAR	ROU	NSV	LGY	MLW	DOV	CLT; 8	SBO	HCY	ROU	SBO	ROU	HCY	IRP	LGY	SBO	BRI	DAR	RCH	NWS	CLT	HCY	CAR	MAR							112th	-	

=== ARCA Permatex SuperCar Series ===
(key) (Bold – Pole position awarded by qualifying time. Italics – Pole position earned by points standings or practice time. * – Most laps led.)

ARCA Permatex SuperCar Series results
Year	Team	No.	Make	1	2	3	4	5	6	7	8	9	10	11	12	13	14	15	16	17	18	19	20	APSC	Pts	Ref
1976		81	Dodge	SLM	DAY	QCS	FMS	TAL; 28	QCS	AVS	SLM	FRS	TOL	NSV	TOL	SLM								NA	0	
1983	McDuffie Racing	7	Pontiac	DAY	NSV	TAL; 34	LPR	LPR	ISF	IRP	SSP	FRS	BFS	WIN	LPR	POC	TAL	MCS	FRS	MIL	DSF	ZAN	SND	NA	0	
1984	McDuffie Racing	72	Olds	DAY	ATL	TAL	CSP	SMS	FRS	MCS	LCS	IRP	TAL; 21	FRS	ISF	DSF	TOL	MGR						NA	0	
1986	McDuffie Racing	77	Pontiac	ATL	DAY	ATL	TAL; 31	SIR	SSP	FRS	KIL	CSP												67th	-	
1986	McDuffie Racing	78	Pontiac										TAL; 6	BLN	ISF	DSF	TOL	MCS	ATL					67th	-	
1988	McDuffie Racing	79	Pontiac	DAY	ATL	TAL	FRS	PCS	ROC	POC	WIN	KIL	ACS	SLM	POC	TAL	DEL	FRS	ISF	DSF	SLM	ATL; 10		115th	-	
1989	McDuffie Racing	79	Pontiac	DAY; 41	ATL; 39	KIL	TAL	FRS	POC	KIL	HAG	POC	TAL	DEL	FRS	ISF	TOL	DSF	SLM	ATL				74th	-	
1990	McDuffie Racing	70	Pontiac	DAY	ATL	KIL	TAL	FRS	POC	KIL	TOL	HAG	POC	TAL; 16	MCH; 22	ISF	TOL	DSF	WIN	DEL	ATL			79th	-	
1991	McDuffie Racing	70	Pontiac	DAY	ATL	KIL	TAL; 25	TOL	FRS		MCH; 13	KIL	FRS	DEL	POC	TAL	HPT	MCH	ISF	TOL	DSF	TWS	ATL	62nd	-	
1991		08	Olds							POC; 19														62nd	-	
Results before 1979 may be incomplete.

== See also ==
- List of NASCAR fatalities

Preceded by Grant Adcox	NASCAR Winston Cup Series fatal accidents 1991	Succeeded by Neil Bonnett
