= McDuffie Racing =

NASCAR stock car racing team

- Owner: J. D. McDuffie
- Series: Winston Cup Series
- Race drivers: J. D. McDuffie; Jeff McDuffie; Glen McDuffie; Henley Gray; Charlie Baker; Larry Manning; Dick May; Rodney Bruce; Larry Esau; Tom Usry
- Manufacturer: Ford (1963–1967, 1970); Buick (1968–1970, 1980); Mercury (1970–1971); Chevrolet (1971–1981, 1985); Oldsmobile (1979); Pontiac (1981–1991)
- Opened: 1963
- Closed: 1991

Career
- Races competed: 639; JD McDuffie: 624; 9 others: 15
- Race victories: 0
- Pole positions: 1

McDuffie Racing was a stock car racing team owned by J. D. McDuffie that competed in the NASCAR Winston Cup Series from 1963 until McDuffie's death in 1991. J. D. McDuffie competed in the majority of the team's races; Jeff and Glen McDuffie, Henley Gray, Charlie Baker, Larry Manning, Dick May, Rodney Bruce, Larry Esau, and Tom Usry also competed for the team. The team ran the No. 76 in its inaugural season in 1963, however after two years of not competing switched to the No. 70 in 1966 and continued to use the number through the end of its existence. The team competed in a total of 639 races in the Winston Cup Series; although none of its drivers won a race with the team, they did record 11 top-five finishes, 105 top-tens, 354 top-20s, and one pole. The team also recorded 284 DNF's.

The team closed following the death of team owner and driver J. D. McDuffie in a racing accident at Watkins Glen International in 1991; four years later, the team's assets were auctioned off. Former driver and McDuffie's older brother Glen died in 2015.
