= Bob Whitcomb Racing =

American pro stock car racing team

- Owner(s): Bob Whitcomb
- Base: Charlotte, North Carolina
- Series: Winston Cup
- Race drivers: Ken Bouchard, Derrike Cope
- Manufacturer: Chevrolet; Ford; Pontiac
- Opened: 1988
- Closed: 1993

Career
- Debut: 1988 Daytona 500
- Latest race: 1992 Hooters 500
- Drivers' Championships: 0
- Race victories: 2

Bob Whitcomb Racing was an American professional stock car racing team that formerly competed in the NASCAR Winston Cup Series. As a successor to DiGard Motorsports, the team achieved its most prominent victory in the 1990 Daytona 500 with driver Derrike Cope. In the same year, they secured a second race win with Cope at the wheel. From at least 1989 until 1990, the team had a technical alliance with Hendrick Motorsports. The team shut down in 1993.

== Cup series ==
During the 1987–88 NASCAR offseason, Keene, New Hampshire businessman Bob Whitcomb bought the assets and the points for the DiGard Motorsports team and rechristened it "Bob Whitcomb Racing". Whitcomb earned his money in the concrete industry through his family's concrete and stone manufacturing business.

In 1988, Whitcomb hired fellow New Englander Ken Bouchard to pilot the No. 10 Ford, winning that season's Rookie of the Year award. The team eventually switched to Pontiac for the final three races of the season. Despite winning Rookie of the Year, Bouchard managed only one top 10 and failed to qualify for five races, including the Daytona 500. In 1989, Bouchard returned, and the team continued to drive Pontiacs.

Five races into the 1989 season, Bouchard was fired in favor of Derrike Cope, who had recently left Jim Testa's No. 68 car. Cope brought sponsorship from Purolator Filters to the team, who required that Cope be the driver if they were to sponsor the No. 10. Together, the team garnered four top-10 finishes in 1989 while also failing to finish nine races.

For the 1990 NASCAR Winston Cup Series season, Whitcomb Racing would switch from the Pontiac Grand Prix to the Chevrolet Lumina, receiving technical support from Hendrick Motorsports. They also bought engines from Hendrick. Cope and Purolator would both return to the team. 1990 would be the breakout season for both the team and Cope. After a strong Speedweeks, Cope was running in the second position behind Dale Earnhardt in the 1990 Daytona 500. On the final lap, Earnhardt would blow a tire, allowing Cope to slide under and score his first career win. Cope would win again later that season at Dover. These would be Cope's only victories in the Cup. In 1991, Purolator and Cope returned to the team. Cope posted two top-10 finishes and one top-5. Cope and Purolator again returned for the 1992 season. The team posted three top tens in the 1992 season. The team lost sponsorship from Purolator, and this effectively caused Bob Whitcomb to shut the team down two weeks before the 1993 Daytona 500 Speedweeks, leaving Cope without a ride. Cope was subsequently offered to drive the 98 for Cale Yarborough Motorsports, leaving Jimmy Hensley without a team for the start of the 1993 season.

The crew chief in 1990 was Buddy Parrott. In mid-1992, the single-car team switched crew chiefs, hiring Barry Dodson, formerly of Rusty Wallace's Penske team.

The team's assets went for sale in 1993, but Whitcomb would make one more attempt as an owner at Richmond in September 1994. Dirk Stephens would fail to qualify.

=== Car No. 10 results ===
NASCAR Winston Cup Series results
Year	Team	No.	Make	1	2	3	4	5	6	7	8	9	10	11	12	13	14	15	16	17	18	19	20	21	22	23	24	25	26	27	28	29	30	31	NWCC	Pts
1988	Ken Bouchard	10	Ford	DAY; DNQ	RCH; 23	CAR; 8	ATL; 16	DAR; 13	BRI; 21		MAR; 31	TAL; DNQ	CLT; 11	DOV; 14	RSD; DNQ	POC; 14	MCH; 17	DAY; 36	POC; 16	TAL; 35	GLN; 27	MCH; 25	BRI; DNQ	DAR; 18	RCH; 19	DOV; 25	MAR; 17	CLT; 33	NWS; 27						29th	2378
1988	Ken Bouchard	10	Chevy							NWS; 27																									29th	2378
1988	Ken Bouchard	10	Pontiac																											CAR; 18	PHO; 23	ATL; DNQ			29th	2378
1989	Ken Bouchard	10	Pontiac	DAY; 16	CAR; 38	ATL; 37	RCH; DNQ	DAR; 22	BRI	NWS	MAR																								29th	2316
1989	Derrike Cope	10	Pontiac									TAL; 30	CLT; 12	DOV; 28	SON	POC; 36	MCH; 9	DAY; 26	POC; 35	TAL; 38	GLN; 40	MCH; 6	BRI; 29	DAR; 25	RCH; 25	DOV; 8	MAR; 13	CLT; 6	NWS; 26	CAR; 11	PHO; 14	ATL; 12			29th	2316
1990	Derrike Cope	10	Chevy	DAY; 1	RCH; 29	CAR; 12	ATL; 29	DAR; 27	BRI; 32	NWS; 21	MAR; 17	TAL; 40	CLT; 9	DOV; 1	SON; 13	POC; 12	MCH; 12	DAY; 28	POC; 13	TAL; 7	GLN; 35	MCH; 19	BRI; 27	DAR; 9	RCH; 35	DOV; 13	MAR; 24	NWS; 22	CLT; 7	CAR; 33	PHO; 14	ATL; 12			19th	3140
1991	Derrike Cope	10	Chevy	DAY; 26	RCH; 32	CAR; 34	ATL; 11	DAR; 31	BRI; 32	NWS; 15	MAR; DNQ	TAL; 28	CLT; 12	DOV; 27	SON; 30	POC; 10	MCH; 41	DAY; 17	POC; 36	TAL; 35	GLN; 13	MCH; 34	BRI; 29	DAR; 4	RCH; 16	DOV; 36	MAR; 19	NWS; 30	CLT; 33	CAR; 15	PHO; 16	ATL; 24			30th	2516
1992	Derrike Cope	10	Chevy	DAY; 34	CAR; 19	RCH; 19	ATL; 14	DAR; 16	BRI; 10	NWS; 14	MAR; 22	TAL; 12	CLT; 17	DOV; 33	SON; 18	POC; 12	MCH; 22	DAY; 34	POC; 19	TAL; 22	GLN; 34	MCH; 33	BRI; 12	DAR; 12	RCH; 35	DOV; 9	MAR; 20	NWS; 22	CLT; 17	CAR; 14	PHO; 7	ATL; 15			21st	3033
1994	Dirk Stephens	51	Ford	DAY	CAR	RCH	ATL	DAR	BRI	NWS	MAR	TAL	SON	CLT	DOV	POC	MCH	DAY	NHA	POC	TAL	IND	GLN	MCH	BRI	DAR	RCH; DNQ	DOV	MAR	NWS	CLT	CAR	PHO	ATL	NR	0
