= 1987 Atlanta Journal 500 =

29th race of the 1987 NASCAR Winston Cup Series

Race details
- Race 29 of 29 in the 1987 NASCAR Winston Cup Series
- The 1987 Atlanta Journal 500 program cover, featuring Dale Earnhardt.
- Date: November 22, 1987
- Official name: 28th Annual Atlanta Journal 500
- Location: Hampton, Georgia, Atlanta International Raceway
- Course: Permanent racing facility
- Course length: 1.522 miles (2.449 km)
- Distance: 328 laps, 499.216 mi (803.41 km)
- Scheduled distance: 328 laps, 499.216 mi (803.41 km)
- Average speed: 139.047 miles per hour (223.774 km/h)
- Attendance: 70,000

Pole position
| Driver | Bill Elliott | Melling Racing |
- Time: 31.428

Most laps led
| Driver | Bill Elliott | Melling Racing |
- Laps: 168

Winner
| No. 9 | Bill Elliott | Melling Racing |

Television in the United States
- Network: ESPN
- Announcers: Bob Jenkins, Larry Nuber

Radio in the United States
- Radio: Motor Racing Network

The 1987 Atlanta Journal 500 was the 29th and final stock car race of the 1987 NASCAR Winston Cup Series season and the 28th iteration of the event. The race was held on Sunday, November 22, 1987, before an audience of 70,000 in Hampton, Georgia, at Atlanta International Raceway, a 1.522 miles (2.449 km) permanent asphalt quad-oval intermediate speedway. The race took the scheduled 328 laps to complete.

By race's end, Melling Racing's Bill Elliott, with the assistance of a makeshift pit crew, managed to dominate the late stages of the race, leading the final 82 laps to take his 23rd career NASCAR Winston Cup Series victory and his sixth and final victory of the season. To fill out the top three, Richard Childress Racing's Dale Earnhardt and Bud Moore Engineering's Ricky Rudd finished second and third, respectively.

== Background ==
The layout of Atlanta Motor Speedway, the circuit where the race was held.

Atlanta International Raceway is a 1.522-mile race track in Hampton, Georgia, United States, 20 miles (32 km) south of Atlanta. It has annually hosted NASCAR Winston Cup Series stock car races since its inauguration in 1960.

The venue was bought by Speedway Motorsports in 1990. In 1994, 46 condominiums were built over the northeastern side of the track. In 1997, to standardize the track with Speedway Motorsports' other two intermediate ovals, the entire track was almost completely rebuilt. The frontstretch and backstretch were swapped, and the configuration of the track was changed from oval to quad-oval, with a new official length of 1.54-mile (2.48 km) where before it was 1.522-mile (2.449 km). The project made the track one of the fastest on the NASCAR circuit.

=== Entry list ===
- (R) - denotes rookie driver.

| # | Driver | Team | Make | Sponsor |
|---|---|---|---|---|
| 1 | Brett Bodine | Ellington Racing | Chevrolet | Bull's-Eye Barbecue Sauce |
| 3 | Dale Earnhardt | Richard Childress Racing | Chevrolet | Wrangler |
| 4 | Rick Wilson | Morgan–McClure Motorsports | Oldsmobile | Kodak |
| 5 | Geoff Bodine | Hendrick Motorsports | Chevrolet | Levi Garrett |
| 6 | Larry Pollard | U.S. Racing | Chevrolet | U.S. Racing |
| 7 | Alan Kulwicki | AK Racing | Ford | Zerex |
| 8 | Bobby Hillin Jr. | Stavola Brothers Racing | Buick | Miller American |
| 08 | Butch Miller | Throop Racing | Chevrolet | Throop Racing |
| 9 | Bill Elliott | Melling Racing | Ford | Coors |
| 11 | Terry Labonte | Junior Johnson & Associates | Chevrolet | Budweiser |
| 12 | Trevor Boys | Hamby Racing | Chevrolet | Hamby Racing |
| 14 | A. J. Foyt | A. J. Foyt Racing | Oldsmobile | Copenhagen |
| 15 | Ricky Rudd | Bud Moore Engineering | Ford | Motorcraft Quality Parts |
| 16 | Larry Pearson | Pearson Racing | Chevrolet | Chattanooga Chew |
| 17 | Darrell Waltrip | Hendrick Motorsports | Chevrolet | Tide |
| 18 | Dale Jarrett (R) | Freedlander Motorsports | Chevrolet | Coats & Clark |
| 21 | Kyle Petty | Wood Brothers Racing | Ford | Citgo |
| 22 | Bobby Allison | Stavola Brothers Racing | Buick | Miller American |
| 26 | Morgan Shepherd | King Racing | Buick | Quaker State |
| 27 | Rusty Wallace | Blue Max Racing | Pontiac | Kodiak |
| 28 | Davey Allison (R) | Ranier-Lundy Racing | Ford | Texaco, Havoline |
| 29 | Cale Yarborough | Cale Yarborough Motorsports | Oldsmobile | Hardee's |
| 30 | Michael Waltrip | Bahari Racing | Chevrolet | All Pro Auto Parts |
| 31 | Brad Teague | Bob Clark Motorsports | Oldsmobile | Slender You Figure Salons |
| 33 | Harry Gant | Mach 1 Racing | Chevrolet | Skoal Bandit |
| 34 | Eddie Bierschwale | AAG Racing | Chevrolet | Allen's Glass |
| 35 | Benny Parsons | Hendrick Motorsports | Chevrolet | Folgers Decaf |
| 36 | H. B. Bailey | Bailey Racing | Pontiac | Almeda Auto Parts |
| 43 | Richard Petty | Petty Enterprises | Pontiac | STP |
| 44 | Sterling Marlin | Hagan Racing | Oldsmobile | Piedmont Airlines |
| 48 | Ron Esau | Hylton Motorsports | Chevrolet | Hylton Motorsports |
| 50 | Greg Sacks | Dingman Brothers Racing | Pontiac | Valvoline |
| 52 | Jimmy Means | Hendrick Motorsports | Chevrolet | Eureka |
| 55 | Phil Parsons | Jackson Bros. Motorsports | Oldsmobile | Skoal Classic |
| 62 | Steve Christman (R) | Winkle Motorsports | Pontiac | AC Spark Plug |
| 64 | Curtis Markham | Langley Racing | Ford | Sunny King Ford |
| 67 | Buddy Arrington | Arrington Racing | Ford | Pannill Sweatshirts |
| 70 | J. D. McDuffie | McDuffie Racing | Pontiac | Rumple Furniture |
| 71 | Dave Marcis | Marcis Auto Racing | Chevrolet | Lifebuoy |
| 75 | Joe Ruttman | RahMoc Enterprises | Pontiac | Valvoline |
| 76 | Hut Stricklin | Jaehne Motorsports | Oldsmobile | Jaehne Motorsports |
| 77 | Ken Ragan | Ragan Racing | Ford | Southlake Ford |
| 80 | Jimmy Horton | S&H Racing | Ford | S&H Racing |
| 82 | Mark Stahl | Stahl Racing | Ford | Auto Bell Car Wash |
| 83 | Lake Speed | Speed Racing | Oldsmobile | Kmart, Wynn's |
| 85 | Bobby Gerhart | Bobby Gerhart Racing | Chevrolet | J. Omar Landis Enterprises |
| 86 | Rick Jeffrey | Jeffrey Racing | Chevrolet | Jeffrey Racing |
| 87 | Randy Baker | Buck Baker Racing | Chevrolet | Sony |
| 88 | Buddy Baker | Baker–Schiff Racing | Oldsmobile | Crisco |
| 90 | Ken Schrader | Donlavey Racing | Ford | Red Baron Frozen Pizza |
| 91 | Philip Duffie | Duffie Racing | Chevrolet | Duffie Racing |
| 93 | Charlie Baker | Salmon Racing | Pontiac | Salmon Racing |
| 98 | Ed Pimm | Curb Racing | Buick | Sunoco |

== Qualifying ==
Qualifying was split into two rounds. The first round was held on Friday, November 20, at 2:00 p.m. EST. Each driver had one lap to set a time. During the first round, the top 20 drivers in the round were guaranteed a starting spot in the race. If a driver was not able to guarantee a spot in the first round, they had the option to scrub their time from the first round and try and run a faster lap time in a second round qualifying run, held on Saturday, November 21, at 10:30 a.m. EST. As with the first round, each driver had one lap to set a time. For this specific race, positions 21-40 were decided on time, and depending on who needed it, a select amount of positions were given to cars who had not otherwise qualified but were high enough in owner's points; up to two were given.

Bill Elliott, driving for Melling Racing, managed to win the pole, setting a time of 31.428 and an average speed of 174.341 miles per hour (280.575 km/h) in the first round.

11 drivers failed to qualify.

=== Full qualifying results ===
| Pos. | # | Driver | Team | Make | Time | Speed |
|---|---|---|---|---|---|---|
| 1 | 9 | Bill Elliott | Melling Racing | Ford | 31.428 | 174.341 |
| 2 | 3 | Dale Earnhardt | Richard Childress Racing | Chevrolet | 31.578 | 173.513 |
| 3 | 83 | Lake Speed | Speed Racing | Oldsmobile | 31.797 | 172.318 |
| 4 | 33 | Harry Gant | Mach 1 Racing | Chevrolet | 31.817 | 172.210 |
| 5 | 28 | Davey Allison (R) | Ranier-Lundy Racing | Ford | 31.838 | 172.096 |
| 6 | 29 | Cale Yarborough | Cale Yarborough Motorsports | Oldsmobile | 31.845 | 172.058 |
| 7 | 26 | Morgan Shepherd | King Racing | Buick | 31.857 | 171.994 |
| 8 | 4 | Rick Wilson | Morgan–McClure Motorsports | Oldsmobile | 31.913 | 171.692 |
| 9 | 90 | Ken Schrader | Donlavey Racing | Ford | 31.933 | 171.584 |
| 10 | 50 | Greg Sacks | Dingman Brothers Racing | Pontiac | 31.952 | 171.482 |
| 11 | 35 | Benny Parsons | Hendrick Motorsports | Chevrolet | 31.966 | 171.407 |
| 12 | 11 | Terry Labonte | Junior Johnson & Associates | Chevrolet | 31.969 | 171.391 |
| 13 | 7 | Alan Kulwicki | AK Racing | Ford | 32.041 | 171.006 |
| 14 | 15 | Ricky Rudd | Bud Moore Engineering | Ford | 32.054 | 170.937 |
| 15 | 22 | Bobby Allison | Stavola Brothers Racing | Buick | 32.060 | 170.905 |
| 16 | 27 | Rusty Wallace | Blue Max Racing | Pontiac | 32.077 | 170.814 |
| 17 | 5 | Geoff Bodine | Hendrick Motorsports | Chevrolet | 32.090 | 170.745 |
| 18 | 88 | Buddy Baker | Baker–Schiff Racing | Oldsmobile | 32.093 | 170.729 |
| 19 | 76 | Hut Stricklin | Jaehne Motorsports | Oldsmobile | 32.177 | 170.283 |
| 20 | 55 | Phil Parsons | Jackson Bros. Motorsports | Oldsmobile | 32.188 | 170.225 |
Failed to lock in Round 1
| 21 | 17 | Darrell Waltrip | Hendrick Motorsports | Chevrolet | 32.020 | 171.118 |
| 22 | 44 | Sterling Marlin | Hagan Racing | Oldsmobile | 32.057 | 170.921 |
| 23 | 77 | Ken Ragan | Ragan Racing | Ford | 32.228 | 170.014 |
| 24 | 31 | Brad Teague | Bob Clark Motorsports | Oldsmobile | 32.234 | 169.982 |
| 25 | 71 | Dave Marcis | Marcis Auto Racing | Chevrolet | 32.253 | 169.882 |
| 26 | 30 | Michael Waltrip | Bahari Racing | Chevrolet | 32.264 | 169.824 |
| 27 | 14 | A. J. Foyt | A. J. Foyt Racing | Oldsmobile | 32.267 | 169.808 |
| 28 | 1 | Brett Bodine | Ellington Racing | Chevrolet | 32.339 | 169.430 |
| 29 | 21 | Kyle Petty | Wood Brothers Racing | Ford | 32.370 | 169.268 |
| 30 | 43 | Richard Petty | Petty Enterprises | Pontiac | 32.397 | 169.127 |
| 31 | 75 | Joe Ruttman | RahMoc Enterprises | Pontiac | 32.414 | 169.038 |
| 32 | 16 | Larry Pearson | Pearson Racing | Chevrolet | 32.414 | 169.038 |
| 33 | 18 | Dale Jarrett (R) | Freedlander Motorsports | Chevrolet | 32.418 | 169.017 |
| 34 | 64 | Curtis Markham | Langley Racing | Ford | 32.435 | 168.929 |
| 35 | 52 | Jimmy Means | Jimmy Means Racing | Pontiac | 32.444 | 168.882 |
| 36 | 82 | Mark Stahl | Stahl Racing | Ford | 32.460 | 168.799 |
| 37 | 36 | H. B. Bailey | Bailey Racing | Pontiac | 32.495 | 168.617 |
| 38 | 87 | Randy Baker | Buck Baker Racing | Chevrolet | 32.498 | 168.601 |
| 39 | 98 | Ed Pimm | Curb Racing | Buick | 32.501 | 168.586 |
| 40 | 93 | Charlie Baker | McDuffie Racing | Pontiac | 32.550 | 168.332 |
Provisionals
| 41 | 8 | Bobby Hillin Jr. | Stavola Brothers Racing | Buick | 32.747 | 167.319 |
| 42 | 67 | Buddy Arrington | Arrington Racing | Ford | 32.643 | 167.852 |
Failed to qualify
| 43 | 6 | Larry Pollard | U.S. Racing | Chevrolet | -* | -* |
| 44 | 86 | Rick Jeffrey | Jeffrey Racing | Chevrolet | -* | -* |
| 45 | 70 | J. D. McDuffie | McDuffie Racing | Pontiac | -* | -* |
| 46 | 34 | Eddie Bierschwale | AAG Racing | Chevrolet | -* | -* |
| 47 | 12 | Trevor Boys | Hamby Racing | Ford | -* | -* |
| 48 | 91 | Philip Duffie | Duffie Racing | Chevrolet | -* | -* |
| 49 | 85 | Bobby Gerhart | Bobby Gerhart Racing | Chevrolet | -* | -* |
| 50 | 08 | Butch Miller | Throop Racing | Chevrolet | -* | -* |
| 51 | 48 | Ron Esau | Hylton Motorsports | Chevrolet | -* | -* |
| 52 | 80 | Jimmy Horton | S&H Racing | Ford | -* | -* |
| 53 | 62 | Steve Christman (R) | Winkle Motorsports | Pontiac | -* | -* |
Official first round qualifying results
Official starting lineup

== Race results ==
| Fin | St | # | Driver | Team | Make | Laps | Led | Status | Pts | Winnings |
|---|---|---|---|---|---|---|---|---|---|---|
| 1 | 1 | 9 | Bill Elliott | Melling Racing | Ford | 328 | 168 | running | 185 | $74,200 |
| 2 | 2 | 3 | Dale Earnhardt | Richard Childress Racing | Chevrolet | 328 | 133 | running | 175 | $35,350 |
| 3 | 14 | 15 | Ricky Rudd | Bud Moore Engineering | Ford | 328 | 19 | running | 170 | $22,585 |
| 4 | 15 | 22 | Bobby Allison | Stavola Brothers Racing | Buick | 328 | 0 | running | 160 | $16,725 |
| 5 | 5 | 28 | Davey Allison (R) | Ranier-Lundy Racing | Ford | 327 | 3 | running | 160 | $9,985 |
| 6 | 13 | 7 | Alan Kulwicki | AK Racing | Ford | 327 | 0 | running | 150 | $14,110 |
| 7 | 11 | 35 | Benny Parsons | Hendrick Motorsports | Chevrolet | 327 | 2 | running | 151 | $14,440 |
| 8 | 20 | 55 | Phil Parsons | Jackson Bros. Motorsports | Oldsmobile | 327 | 0 | running | 142 | $5,675 |
| 9 | 22 | 44 | Sterling Marlin | Hagan Racing | Oldsmobile | 327 | 0 | running | 138 | $8,605 |
| 10 | 18 | 88 | Buddy Baker | Baker–Schiff Racing | Oldsmobile | 327 | 0 | running | 134 | $5,080 |
| 11 | 31 | 75 | Joe Ruttman | RahMoc Enterprises | Pontiac | 327 | 0 | running | 0 | $7,375 |
| 12 | 16 | 27 | Rusty Wallace | Blue Max Racing | Pontiac | 326 | 0 | running | 127 | $10,965 |
| 13 | 29 | 21 | Kyle Petty | Wood Brothers Racing | Ford | 326 | 0 | running | 124 | $9,835 |
| 14 | 41 | 8 | Bobby Hillin Jr. | Stavola Brothers Racing | Buick | 325 | 0 | running | 121 | $9,700 |
| 15 | 28 | 1 | Brett Bodine | Ellington Racing | Chevrolet | 324 | 0 | running | 118 | $2,925 |
| 16 | 19 | 76 | Hut Stricklin | Jaehne Motorsports | Oldsmobile | 322 | 0 | running | 115 | $2,460 |
| 17 | 24 | 31 | Brad Teague | Bob Clark Motorsports | Oldsmobile | 320 | 0 | running | 112 | $2,345 |
| 18 | 21 | 17 | Darrell Waltrip | Hendrick Motorsports | Chevrolet | 317 | 1 | running | 114 | $6,300 |
| 19 | 37 | 36 | H. B. Bailey | Bailey Racing | Pontiac | 316 | 0 | running | 106 | $2,120 |
| 20 | 38 | 87 | Randy Baker | Buck Baker Racing | Chevrolet | 315 | 0 | running | 103 | $2,560 |
| 21 | 36 | 82 | Mark Stahl | Stahl Racing | Ford | 311 | 0 | running | 100 | $1,925 |
| 22 | 42 | 67 | Buddy Arrington | Arrington Racing | Ford | 311 | 0 | running | 97 | $5,795 |
| 23 | 23 | 77 | Ken Ragan | Ragan Racing | Ford | 281 | 0 | wheel bearing | 94 | $1,755 |
| 24 | 4 | 33 | Harry Gant | Mach 1 Racing | Chevrolet | 280 | 0 | engine | 91 | $5,505 |
| 25 | 32 | 16 | Larry Pearson | Pearson Racing | Chevrolet | 268 | 0 | crash | 88 | $1,605 |
| 26 | 10 | 50 | Greg Sacks | Dingman Brothers Racing | Pontiac | 220 | 1 | oil pan | 90 | $1,575 |
| 27 | 8 | 4 | Rick Wilson | Morgan–McClure Motorsports | Oldsmobile | 219 | 0 | crash | 82 | $1,525 |
| 28 | 12 | 11 | Terry Labonte | Junior Johnson & Associates | Chevrolet | 203 | 0 | flywheel | 79 | $10,295 |
| 29 | 35 | 52 | Jimmy Means | Jimmy Means Racing | Pontiac | 171 | 0 | vibration | 76 | $5,140 |
| 30 | 30 | 43 | Richard Petty | Petty Enterprises | Pontiac | 154 | 0 | crash | 73 | $5,600 |
| 31 | 17 | 5 | Geoff Bodine | Hendrick Motorsports | Chevrolet | 154 | 0 | crash | 70 | $8,410 |
| 32 | 25 | 71 | Dave Marcis | Marcis Auto Racing | Chevrolet | 150 | 0 | crank | 67 | $4,585 |
| 33 | 40 | 93 | Charlie Baker (Note: Baker was relieved by J. D. McDuffie on the 44th lap of the race. As Baker started the race, he is credited with the finish.) | McDuffie Racing | Pontiac | 147 | 0 | crash | 64 | $1,350 |
| 34 | 34 | 64 | Curtis Markham | Langley Racing | Ford | 126 | 0 | engine | 0 | $4,375 |
| 35 | 9 | 90 | Ken Schrader | Donlavey Racing | Ford | 110 | 1 | engine | 63 | $4,090 |
| 36 | 33 | 18 | Dale Jarrett (R) | Freedlander Motorsports | Chevrolet | 84 | 0 | clutch | 55 | $4,065 |
| 37 | 27 | 14 | A. J. Foyt | A. J. Foyt Racing | Oldsmobile | 76 | 0 | handling | 52 | $1,285 |
| 38 | 26 | 30 | Michael Waltrip | Bahari Racing | Chevrolet | 75 | 0 | engine | 49 | $4,025 |
| 39 | 7 | 26 | Morgan Shepherd | King Racing | Buick | 49 | 0 | engine | 46 | $3,990 |
| 40 | 6 | 29 | Cale Yarborough | Cale Yarborough Motorsports | Oldsmobile | 32 | 0 | crash | 43 | $1,235 |
| 41 | 3 | 83 | Lake Speed | Speed Racing | Oldsmobile | 32 | 0 | crash | 40 | $1,235 |
| 42 | 39 | 98 | Ed Pimm | Curb Racing | Buick | 30 | 0 | crash | 37 | $1,235 |
Failed to qualify
| 43 | | 6 | Larry Pollard | U.S. Racing | Chevrolet | | | | | |
| 44 | | 86 | Rick Jeffrey | Jeffrey Racing | Chevrolet | | | | | |
| 45 | | 70 | J. D. McDuffie | McDuffie Racing | Pontiac | | | | | |
| 46 | | 34 | Eddie Bierschwale | AAG Racing | Chevrolet | | | | | |
| 47 | | 12 | Trevor Boys | Hamby Racing | Ford | | | | | |
| 48 | | 91 | Philip Duffie | Duffie Racing | Chevrolet | | | | | |
| 49 | | 85 | Bobby Gerhart | Bobby Gerhart Racing | Chevrolet | | | | | |
| 50 | | 08 | Butch Miller | Throop Racing | Chevrolet | | | | | |
| 51 | | 48 | Ron Esau | Hylton Motorsports | Chevrolet | | | | | |
| 52 | | 80 | Jimmy Horton | S&H Racing | Ford | | | | | |
| 53 | | 62 | Steve Christman (R) | Winkle Motorsports | Pontiac | | | | | |
Official race results

== Standings after the race ==
Drivers' Championship standings

| | Pos | Driver | Points |
|---|---|---|---|
| | 1 | Dale Earnhardt | 4,696 |
| | 2 | Bill Elliott | 4,207 (-489) |
| | 3 | Terry Labonte | 4,002 (-694) |
| | 4 | Darrell Waltrip | 3,916 (–780) |
| | 5 | Rusty Wallace | 3,818 (–878) |
| 2 | 6 | Ricky Rudd | 3,742 (–954) |
| | 7 | Kyle Petty | 3,737 (–959) |
| 2 | 8 | Richard Petty | 3,708 (–988) |
| | 9 | Bobby Allison | 3,525 (–1,171) |
| 1 | 10 | Ken Schrader | 3,405 (–1,291) |
Official driver's standings

- Note: Only the first 10 positions are included for the driver standings.

== Notes ==
| Previous race: 1987 Winston Western 500 | NASCAR Winston Cup Series; 1987 season | Next race: 1988 Daytona 500 |
