= 1990 Pepsi 400 =

15th race of the 1990 NASCAR Winston Cup Series

Race details
- Race 15 of 29 in the 1990 NASCAR Winston Cup Series
- The 1990 Pepsi 400 program cover.
- Date: July 7, 1990
- Official name: 32nd Annual Pepsi 400
- Location: Daytona Beach, Florida, Daytona International Speedway
- Course: Permanent racing facility
- Course length: 2.5 miles (4.0 km)
- Distance: 160 laps, 400 mi (643.737 km)
- Scheduled distance: 160 laps, 400 mi (643.737 km)
- Average speed: 160.894 miles per hour (258.934 km/h)

Pole position
Driver	Greg Sacks	Hendrick Motorsports
- Time: 46.028

Most laps led
Driver	Dale Earnhardt	Richard Childress Racing
- Laps: 127

Winner
No. 3	Dale Earnhardt	Richard Childress Racing

Television in the United States
- Network: ESPN
- Announcers: Bob Jenkins, Benny Parsons, Ned Jarrett

Radio in the United States
- Radio: Motor Racing Network

The 1990 Pepsi 400 was the 15th stock car race of the 1990 NASCAR Winston Cup Series season and the 32nd iteration of the event. The race was held on Saturday, July 7, 1990, in Daytona Beach, Florida at Daytona International Speedway, a 2.5 miles (4.0 km) permanent triangular-shaped superspeedway. The race took the scheduled 160 laps to complete. In a three-lap shootout to the finish, Richard Childress Racing driver Dale Earnhardt would manage to defend the field to complete a dominant performance throughout the race, leading 127 laps. The victory was Earnhardt's 44th career NASCAR Winston Cup Series victory and his fifth victory of the season. To fill out the top three, owner-driver Alan Kulwicki and Hendrick Motorsports driver Ken Schrader would finish second and third, respectively.

Heading into lap two of the race, a 23-car crash would occur on the track's front-stretch after Derrike Cope's car would accidentally scuff into the right side of Greg Sacks's car, sending Sacks loose into Richard Petty's car, sending Petty's car directly crashing in front of the oncoming field, triggering a major pileup, commonly referred to in NASCAR as a big one.

== Background ==
The layout of Daytona International Speedway, the venue where the race was held.

Daytona International Speedway is one of three superspeedways to hold NASCAR races, the other two being Indianapolis Motor Speedway and Talladega Superspeedway. The standard track at Daytona International Speedway is a four-turn superspeedway that is 2.5 miles (4.0 km) long. The track's turns are banked at 31 degrees, while the front stretch, the location of the finish line, is banked at 18 degrees.

=== Entry list ===
- (R) denotes rookie driver.

#	Driver	Team	Make
1	Terry Labonte	Precision Products Racing	Oldsmobile
01	Mickey Gibbs	Gibbs Racing	Ford
2	Charlie Glotzbach	U.S. Racing	Pontiac
3	Dale Earnhardt	Richard Childress Racing	Chevrolet
4	Ernie Irvan	Morgan–McClure Motorsports	Oldsmobile
5	Ricky Rudd	Hendrick Motorsports	Chevrolet
6	Mark Martin	Roush Racing	Ford
06	Terry Byers	Byers Racing	Pontiac
7	Alan Kulwicki	AK Racing	Ford
8	Bobby Hillin Jr.	Stavola Brothers Racing	Buick
9	Bill Elliott	Melling Racing	Ford
10	Derrike Cope	Whitcomb Racing	Chevrolet
11	Geoff Bodine	Junior Johnson & Associates	Ford
12	Hut Stricklin	Bobby Allison Motorsports	Buick
14	A. J. Foyt	A. J. Foyt Racing	Oldsmobile
15	Morgan Shepherd	Bud Moore Engineering	Ford
17	Darrell Waltrip (Note: Driver changed to Jimmy Horton for the race due to Waltrip suffering injuries in a practice session on Friday.)	Hendrick Motorsports	Chevrolet
18	Greg Sacks	Hendrick Motorsports	Chevrolet
19	Chad Little	Little Racing	Ford
20	Rob Moroso (R)	Moroso Racing	Oldsmobile
21	Dale Jarrett	Wood Brothers Racing	Ford
25	Ken Schrader	Hendrick Motorsports	Chevrolet
26	Brett Bodine	King Racing	Buick
27	Rusty Wallace	Blue Max Racing	Pontiac
28	Davey Allison	Robert Yates Racing	Ford
30	Michael Waltrip	Bahari Racing	Pontiac
33	Harry Gant	Leo Jackson Motorsports	Oldsmobile
42	Kyle Petty	SABCO Racing	Pontiac
43	Richard Petty	Petty Enterprises	Pontiac
47	Jack Pennington (R)	Close Racing	Oldsmobile
52	Jimmy Means	Jimmy Means Racing	Pontiac
57	Jimmy Spencer	Osterlund Racing	Pontiac
66	Dick Trickle	Cale Yarborough Motorsports	Pontiac
70	J. D. McDuffie	McDuffie Racing	Pontiac
71	Dave Marcis	Marcis Auto Racing	Chevrolet
72	Tracy Leslie	Parker Racing	Oldsmobile
73	Phil Barkdoll	Barkdoll Racing	Oldsmobile
75	Rick Wilson	RahMoc Enterprises	Pontiac
82	Mark Stahl	Stahl Racing	Ford
90	Buddy Baker	Donlavey Racing	Ford
94	Sterling Marlin	Hagan Racing	Oldsmobile
96	Philip Duffie	Duffie Racing	Buick
98	Butch Miller	Travis Carter Enterprises	Chevrolet

== Qualifying ==
Qualifying was split into two rounds. The first round was held on Thursday, July 5, at 10:00 AM EST. Each driver would have one lap to set a time. During the first round, the top 20 drivers in the round would be guaranteed a starting spot in the race. If a driver was not able to guarantee a spot in the first round, they had the option to scrub their time from the first round and try and run a faster lap time in a second round qualifying run, held on Friday, July 6, at 11:00 AM EST. As with the first round, each driver would have one lap to set a time. For this specific race, positions 21-40 would be decided on time, and depending on who needed it, a select amount of positions were given to cars who had not otherwise qualified but were high enough in owner's points; up to two provisionals were given.

Greg Sacks, driving for Hendrick Motorsports, would win the pole, setting a time of 46.028 and an average speed of 195.533 miles per hour (314.680 km/h) in the first round.

Three drivers would fail to qualify.

=== Full qualifying results ===
Pos.	#	Driver	Team	Make	Time	Speed
1	18	Greg Sacks	Hendrick Motorsports	Chevrolet	46.028	195.533
2	6	Mark Martin	Roush Racing	Ford	46.069	195.359
3	3	Dale Earnhardt	Richard Childress Racing	Chevrolet	46.133	195.088
4	9	Bill Elliott	Melling Racing	Ford	46.168	194.940
5	17	Darrell Waltrip	Hendrick Motorsports	Chevrolet	46.393	193.995
6	25	Ken Schrader	Hendrick Motorsports	Chevrolet	46.395	193.986
7	43	Richard Petty	Petty Enterprises	Pontiac	46.474	193.657
8	1	Terry Labonte	Precision Products Racing	Oldsmobile	46.479	193.636
9	5	Ricky Rudd	Hendrick Motorsports	Chevrolet	46.497	193.561
10	42	Kyle Petty	SABCO Racing	Pontiac	46.537	193.395
11	20	Rob Moroso (R)	Moroso Racing	Oldsmobile	46.662	192.876
12	7	Alan Kulwicki	AK Racing	Ford	46.714	192.662
13	94	Sterling Marlin	Hagan Racing	Oldsmobile	46.735	192.575
14	4	Ernie Irvan	Morgan–McClure Motorsports	Oldsmobile	46.781	192.386
15	11	Geoff Bodine	Junior Johnson & Associates	Ford	46.795	192.328
16	33	Harry Gant	Leo Jackson Motorsports	Oldsmobile	46.818	192.234
17	28	Davey Allison	Robert Yates Racing	Ford	46.856	192.078
18	10	Derrike Cope	Whitcomb Racing	Chevrolet	46.972	191.604
19	14	A. J. Foyt	A. J. Foyt Racing	Oldsmobile	47.008	191.457
20	26	Brett Bodine	King Racing	Buick	47.020	191.408
Failed to lock in Round 1
21	12	Hut Stricklin	Bobby Allison Motorsports	Buick	47.072	191.196
22	52	Jimmy Means	Jimmy Means Racing	Pontiac	47.087	191.136
23	75	Rick Wilson	RahMoc Enterprises	Oldsmobile	47.102	191.075
24	21	Dale Jarrett	Wood Brothers Racing	Ford	47.156	190.856
25	27	Rusty Wallace	Blue Max Racing	Pontiac	47.196	190.694
26	73	Phil Barkdoll	Barkdoll Racing	Oldsmobile	47.222	190.589
27	30	Michael Waltrip	Bahari Racing	Pontiac	47.246	190.492
28	8	Bobby Hillin Jr.	Stavola Brothers Racing	Buick	47.252	190.468
29	01	Mickey Gibbs	Gibbs Racing	Ford	47.308	190.243
30	66	Dick Trickle	Cale Yarborough Motorsports	Pontiac	47.335	190.134
31	15	Morgan Shepherd	Bud Moore Engineering	Ford	47.347	190.086
32	19	Chad Little	Little Racing	Ford	47.399	189.877
33	57	Jimmy Spencer	Osterlund Racing	Pontiac	47.420	189.793
34	71	Dave Marcis	Marcis Auto Racing	Pontiac	47.426	189.769
35	90	Buddy Baker	Donlavey Racing	Ford	47.502	189.466
36	47	Jack Pennington (R)	Close Racing	Oldsmobile	47.582	189.147
37	98	Butch Miller	Travis Carter Enterprises	Chevrolet	47.739	188.525
38	2	Charlie Glotzbach	U.S. Racing	Pontiac	48.237	186.579
39	06	Terry Byers	Byers Racing	Pontiac	48.799	184.430
40	96	Philip Duffie	Duffie Racing	Buick	48.933	183.925
Failed to qualify
41	82	Mark Stahl	Stahl Racing	Ford	49.361	182.331
42	70	J. D. McDuffie	McDuffie Racing	Pontiac	49.781	180.792
43	72	Tracy Leslie	Parker Racing	Oldsmobile	-	-
Official first round qualifying results
Official starting lineup

== Race results ==
Fin	St	#	Driver	Team	Make	Laps	Led	Status	Pts	Winnings
1	3	3	Dale Earnhardt	Richard Childress Racing	Chevrolet	160	127	running	185	$72,850
2	12	7	Alan Kulwicki	AK Racing	Ford	160	1	running	175	$38,700
3	6	25	Ken Schrader	Hendrick Motorsports	Chevrolet	160	2	running	170	$31,400
4	8	1	Terry Labonte	Precision Products Racing	Oldsmobile	160	0	running	160	$23,450
5	13	94	Sterling Marlin	Hagan Racing	Oldsmobile	160	15	running	160	$21,250
6	28	8	Bobby Hillin Jr.	Stavola Brothers Racing	Buick	160	7	running	155	$16,832
7	16	33	Harry Gant	Leo Jackson Motorsports	Oldsmobile	160	1	running	151	$17,400
8	24	21	Dale Jarrett	Wood Brothers Racing	Ford	160	0	running	142	$13,500
9	11	20	Rob Moroso (R)	Moroso Racing	Oldsmobile	160	4	running	143	$11,000
10	10	42	Kyle Petty	SABCO Racing	Pontiac	159	0	running	134	$16,875
11	2	6	Mark Martin	Roush Racing	Ford	158	0	running	130	$14,490
12	22	52	Jimmy Means	Jimmy Means Racing	Pontiac	158	0	running	127	$7,300
13	9	5	Ricky Rudd	Hendrick Motorsports	Chevrolet	158	0	running	124	$10,135
14	25	27	Rusty Wallace	Blue Max Racing	Pontiac	158	0	running	121	$17,020
15	33	57	Jimmy Spencer	Osterlund Racing	Pontiac	157	3	running	123	$10,030
16	27	30	Michael Waltrip	Bahari Racing	Pontiac	155	0	running	115	$8,950
17	5	17	Jimmy Horton	Hendrick Motorsports	Chevrolet	155	0	running	112	$14,495
18	36	47	Jack Pennington (R)	Close Racing	Oldsmobile	152	0	running	109	$5,495
19	30	66	Dick Trickle	Cale Yarborough Motorsports	Pontiac	151	0	running	106	$9,125
20	34	71	Dave Marcis	Marcis Auto Racing	Pontiac	140	0	engine	103	$8,570
21	40	96	Philip Duffie	Duffie Racing	Buick	139	0	running	100	$4,710
22	20	26	Brett Bodine	King Racing	Buick	138	0	running	97	$7,515
23	37	98	Butch Miller	Travis Carter Enterprises	Chevrolet	134	0	running	94	$5,270
24	17	28	Davey Allison	Robert Yates Racing	Ford	133	0	running	91	$12,325
25	15	11	Geoff Bodine	Junior Johnson & Associates	Ford	119	0	running	88	$12,730
26	21	12	Hut Stricklin	Bobby Allison Motorsports	Buick	118	0	running	85	$4,860
27	32	19	Chad Little	Little Racing	Ford	114	0	running	82	$4,140
28	18	10	Derrike Cope	Whitcomb Racing	Chevrolet	100	0	running	79	$8,920
29	4	9	Bill Elliott	Melling Racing	Ford	95	0	running	76	$12,525
30	35	90	Buddy Baker	Donlavey Racing	Ford	71	0	accident	73	$3,730
31	26	73	Phil Barkdoll	Barkdoll Racing	Oldsmobile	17	0	accident	70	$3,675
32	29	01	Mickey Gibbs	Gibbs Racing	Ford	13	0	accident	67	$3,645
33	14	4	Ernie Irvan	Morgan–McClure Motorsports	Oldsmobile	6	0	accident	64	$6,310
34	31	15	Morgan Shepherd	Bud Moore Engineering	Ford	2	0	accident	61	$6,260
35	38	2	Charlie Glotzbach	U.S. Racing	Pontiac	2	0	accident	58	$6,205
36	7	43	Richard Petty	Petty Enterprises	Pontiac	1	0	accident	55	$4,900
37	1	18	Greg Sacks	Hendrick Motorsports	Chevrolet	1	0	accident	52	$6,995
38	19	14	A. J. Foyt	A. J. Foyt Racing	Oldsmobile	1	0	accident	49	$3,480
39	23	75	Rick Wilson	RahMoc Enterprises	Oldsmobile	1	0	accident	46	$6,060
40	39	06	Terry Byers	Byers Racing	Pontiac	1	0	accident	43	$3,505
Official race results

== Standings after the race ==
Drivers' Championship standings

	Pos	Driver	Points
	1	Mark Martin	2,221
3	2	Dale Earnhardt	2,158 (-63)
1	3	Rusty Wallace	2,096 (-125)
1	4	Geoff Bodine	2,072 (–149)
3	5	Morgan Shepherd	2,058 (–163)
	6	Kyle Petty	2,009 (–212)
2	7	Ken Schrader	1,990 (–291)
1	8	Ernie Irvan	1,860 (–361)
1	9	Bill Elliott	1,835 (–386)
2	10	Darrell Waltrip	1,777 (–444)
Official driver's standings

- Note: Only the first 10 positions are included for the driver standings.

== Notes ==
Previous race: 1990 Miller Genuine Draft 400 (Michigan)	NASCAR Winston Cup Series; 1990 season	Next race: 1990 AC Spark Plug 500
