= 1990 Heinz Southern 500 =

21st race of the 1990 NASCAR Winston Cup Series

Race details
- Race 21 of 29 in the 1990 NASCAR Winston Cup Series
- The 1990 Heinz Southern 500 program cover, featuring Dale Earnhardt.
- Date: September 2, 1990
- Official name: 41st Annual Heinz Southern 500
- Location: Darlington Raceway, Darlington, South Carolina
- Course: Permanent racing facility
- Course length: 1.366 miles (2.198 km)
- Distance: 367 laps, 501.322 mi (806.799 km)
- Average speed: 123.141 miles per hour (198.176 km/h)

Pole position
| Driver | Dale Earnhardt | Richard Childress Racing |
- Time: 31.036

Most laps led
| Driver | Dale Earnhardt | Richard Childress Racing |
- Laps: 99

Winner
| No. 3 | Dale Earnhardt | Richard Childress Racing |

Television in the United States
- Network: ESPN
- Announcers: Bob Jenkins, Ned Jarrett, Benny Parsons

Radio in the United States
- Radio: Motor Racing Network

The 1990 Heinz Southern 500 was the 21st stock car race of the 1990 NASCAR Winston Cup Series season and the 41st iteration of the event. The race was held on Sunday, September 2, 1990, in Darlington, South Carolina, at Darlington Raceway, a 1.366 miles (2.198 km) permanent egg-shaped oval racetrack. The race took the scheduled 367 laps to complete. At race's end, Richard Childress Racing driver Dale Earnhardt would manage to dominate the late stages of the race, leading the final 54 laps of the race to take his 46th career NASCAR Winston Cup Series victory and his seventh victory of the season. To fill out the top three, Morgan–McClure Motorsports driver Ernie Irvan and owner-driver Alan Kulwicki would finish second and third, respectively.

== Background ==
The layout of Darlington Raceway, the venue where the race was held.

Darlington Raceway is a race track built for NASCAR racing located near Darlington, South Carolina. It is nicknamed "The Lady in Black" and "The Track Too Tough to Tame" by many NASCAR fans and drivers and advertised as "A NASCAR Tradition." It is of a unique, somewhat egg-shaped design, an oval with the ends of very different configurations, a condition which supposedly arose from the proximity of one end of the track to a minnow pond the owner refused to relocate. This situation makes it very challenging for the crews to set up their cars' handling in a way that is effective at both ends.

=== Entry list ===
- (R) denotes rookie driver.

| # | Driver | Team | Make |
|---|---|---|---|
| 1 | Terry Labonte | Precision Products Racing | Oldsmobile |
| 2 | Charlie Glotzbach | U.S. Racing | Pontiac |
| 3 | Dale Earnhardt | Richard Childress Racing | Chevrolet |
| 4 | Ernie Irvan | Morgan–McClure Motorsports | Oldsmobile |
| 5 | Ricky Rudd | Hendrick Motorsports | Chevrolet |
| 6 | Mark Martin | Roush Racing | Ford |
| 7 | Alan Kulwicki | AK Racing | Ford |
| 8 | Bobby Hillin Jr. | Stavola Brothers Racing | Buick |
| 9 | Bill Elliott | Melling Racing | Ford |
| 10 | Derrike Cope | Whitcomb Racing | Chevrolet |
| 11 | Geoff Bodine | Junior Johnson & Associates | Ford |
| 12 | Hut Stricklin | Bobby Allison Motorsports | Buick |
| 15 | Morgan Shepherd | Bud Moore Engineering | Ford |
| 17 | Greg Sacks | Hendrick Motorsports | Chevrolet |
| 19 | Chad Little | Little Racing | Ford |
| 20 | Rob Moroso (R) | Moroso Racing | Oldsmobile |
| 21 | Dale Jarrett | Wood Brothers Racing | Ford |
| 22 | Rick Mast | U.S. Racing | Pontiac |
| 25 | Ken Schrader | Hendrick Motorsports | Chevrolet |
| 26 | Brett Bodine | King Racing | Buick |
| 27 | Rusty Wallace | Blue Max Racing | Pontiac |
| 28 | Davey Allison | Robert Yates Racing | Ford |
| 29 | Phil Parsons | Diamond Ridge Motorsports | Pontiac |
| 30 | Michael Waltrip | Bahari Racing | Pontiac |
| 33 | Harry Gant | Leo Jackson Motorsports | Oldsmobile |
| 36 | H. B. Bailey | Bailey Racing | Pontiac |
| 41 | Larry Pearson | Larry Hedrick Motorsports | Chevrolet |
| 42 | Kyle Petty | SABCO Racing | Pontiac |
| 43 | Richard Petty | Petty Enterprises | Pontiac |
| 47 | Jack Pennington (R) | Close Racing | Oldsmobile |
| 52 | Jimmy Means | Jimmy Means Racing | Pontiac |
| 57 | Jimmy Spencer | Osterlund Racing | Pontiac |
| 66 | Dick Trickle | Cale Yarborough Motorsports | Pontiac |
| 70 | J. D. McDuffie | McDuffie Racing | Pontiac |
| 71 | Dave Marcis | Marcis Auto Racing | Chevrolet |
| 75 | Rick Wilson | RahMoc Enterprises | Pontiac |
| 82 | Mark Stahl | Stahl Racing | Ford |
| 83 | Lake Speed | Speed Racing | Oldsmobile |
| 94 | Sterling Marlin | Hagan Racing | Oldsmobile |
| 96 | Philip Duffie | Duffie Racing | Buick |
| 98 | Butch Miller | Travis Carter Enterprises | Chevrolet |

== Qualifying ==
Qualifying was split into two rounds. The first round was held on Thursday, August 30, at 3:00 PM EST. Each driver would have one lap to set a time. During the first round, the top 20 drivers in the round would be guaranteed a starting spot in the race. If a driver was not able to guarantee a spot in the first round, they had the option to scrub their time from the first round and try and run a faster lap time in a second round qualifying run, held on Friday, August 31, at 2:00 PM EST. As with the first round, each driver would have one lap to set a time. For this specific race, positions 21-40 would be decided on time and depending on who needed it, a select amount of positions were given to cars who had not otherwise qualified on time but were high enough in owner's points; up to two provisionals were given.

Dale Earnhardt, driving for Richard Childress Racing, would win the pole, setting a time of 31.036 and an average speed of 158.448 miles per hour (254.997 km/h) in the first round.

J. D. McDuffie was the only driver to fail to qualify.

=== Full qualifying results ===
| Pos. | # | Driver | Team | Make | Time | Speed |
|---|---|---|---|---|---|---|
| 1 | 3 | Dale Earnhardt | Richard Childress Racing | Chevrolet | 31.036 | 158.448 |
| 2 | 9 | Bill Elliott | Melling Racing | Ford | 31.168 | 157.777 |
| 3 | 11 | Geoff Bodine | Junior Johnson & Associates | Ford | 31.184 | 157.696 |
| 4 | 27 | Rusty Wallace | Blue Max Racing | Pontiac | 31.222 | 157.504 |
| 5 | 5 | Ricky Rudd | Hendrick Motorsports | Chevrolet | 31.225 | 157.489 |
| 6 | 26 | Brett Bodine | King Racing | Buick | 31.236 | 157.434 |
| 7 | 33 | Harry Gant | Leo Jackson Motorsports | Oldsmobile | 31.279 | 157.217 |
| 8 | 7 | Alan Kulwicki | AK Racing | Ford | 31.288 | 157.172 |
| 9 | 10 | Derrike Cope | Whitcomb Racing | Chevrolet | 31.332 | 156.951 |
| 10 | 6 | Mark Martin | Roush Racing | Ford | 31.354 | 156.841 |
| 11 | 4 | Ernie Irvan | Morgan–McClure Motorsports | Chevrolet | 31.365 | 156.786 |
| 12 | 28 | Davey Allison | Robert Yates Racing | Ford | 31.368 | 156.771 |
| 13 | 42 | Kyle Petty | SABCO Racing | Pontiac | 31.469 | 156.268 |
| 14 | 15 | Morgan Shepherd | Bud Moore Engineering | Ford | 31.489 | 156.169 |
| 15 | 66 | Dick Trickle | Cale Yarborough Motorsports | Pontiac | 31.549 | 155.872 |
| 16 | 75 | Rick Wilson | RahMoc Enterprises | Oldsmobile | 31.606 | 155.591 |
| 17 | 71 | Dave Marcis | Marcis Auto Racing | Chevrolet | 31.619 | 155.527 |
| 18 | 21 | Dale Jarrett | Wood Brothers Racing | Ford | 31.639 | 155.428 |
| 19 | 22 | Rick Mast | U.S. Racing | Pontiac | 31.661 | 155.320 |
| 20 | 8 | Bobby Hillin Jr. | Stavola Brothers Racing | Buick | 31.663 | 155.311 |
Failed to lock in Round 1
| 21 | 25 | Ken Schrader | Hendrick Motorsports | Chevrolet | 31.560 | 155.817 |
| 22 | 20 | Rob Moroso (R) | Moroso Racing | Oldsmobile | 31.568 | 155.778 |
| 23 | 94 | Sterling Marlin | Hagan Racing | Oldsmobile | 31.678 | 155.237 |
| 24 | 1 | Terry Labonte | Precision Products Racing | Oldsmobile | 31.749 | 154.890 |
| 25 | 98 | Butch Miller | Travis Carter Enterprises | Chevrolet | 31.761 | 154.831 |
| 26 | 17 | Greg Sacks | Hendrick Motorsports | Chevrolet | 31.765 | 154.812 |
| 27 | 83 | Lake Speed | Speed Racing | Oldsmobile | 31.816 | 154.564 |
| 28 | 29 | Phil Parsons | Diamond Ridge Motorsports | Pontiac | 31.936 | 153.983 |
| 29 | 41 | Larry Pearson | Larry Hedrick Motorsports | Chevrolet | 31.938 | 153.973 |
| 30 | 30 | Michael Waltrip | Bahari Racing | Pontiac | 31.951 | 153.911 |
| 31 | 52 | Jimmy Means | Jimmy Means Racing | Pontiac | 32.056 | 153.407 |
| 32 | 47 | Jack Pennington (R) | Close Racing | Oldsmobile | 32.162 | 152.901 |
| 33 | 43 | Richard Petty | Petty Enterprises | Pontiac | 32.183 | 152.801 |
| 34 | 12 | Hut Stricklin | Bobby Allison Motorsports | Buick | 32.388 | 151.834 |
| 35 | 19 | Chad Little | Little Racing | Ford | 32.466 | 151.469 |
| 36 | 57 | Jimmy Spencer | Osterlund Racing | Pontiac | 32.488 | 151.367 |
| 37 | 36 | H. B. Bailey | Bailey Racing | Pontiac | 32.569 | 150.990 |
| 38 | 96 | Philip Duffie | Duffie Racing | Buick | 32.681 | 150.473 |
| 39 | 2 | Charlie Glotzbach | U.S. Racing | Pontiac | 32.794 | 149.954 |
| 40 | 82 | Mark Stahl | Stahl Racing | Ford | 32.908 | 149.435 |
Failed to qualify
| 41 | 70 | J. D. McDuffie | McDuffie Racing | Pontiac | -* | -* |
Official first round qualifying results
Official starting lineup

== Race results ==
| Fin | St | # | Driver | Team | Make | Laps | Led | Status | Pts | Winnings |
|---|---|---|---|---|---|---|---|---|---|---|
| 1 | 1 | 3 | Dale Earnhardt | Richard Childress Racing | Chevrolet | 367 | 99 | running | 185 | $210,350 |
| 2 | 11 | 4 | Ernie Irvan | Morgan–McClure Motorsports | Chevrolet | 367 | 70 | running | 175 | $35,900 |
| 3 | 8 | 7 | Alan Kulwicki | AK Racing | Ford | 367 | 0 | running | 165 | $23,340 |
| 4 | 2 | 9 | Bill Elliott | Melling Racing | Ford | 367 | 98 | running | 165 | $24,380 |
| 5 | 7 | 33 | Harry Gant | Leo Jackson Motorsports | Oldsmobile | 367 | 0 | running | 155 | $21,340 |
| 6 | 10 | 6 | Mark Martin | Roush Racing | Ford | 367 | 0 | running | 150 | $16,825 |
| 7 | 5 | 5 | Ricky Rudd | Hendrick Motorsports | Chevrolet | 367 | 6 | running | 151 | $12,755 |
| 8 | 3 | 11 | Geoff Bodine | Junior Johnson & Associates | Ford | 367 | 89 | running | 147 | $17,545 |
| 9 | 9 | 10 | Derrike Cope | Whitcomb Racing | Chevrolet | 366 | 0 | running | 138 | $12,105 |
| 10 | 6 | 26 | Brett Bodine | King Racing | Buick | 366 | 0 | running | 134 | $13,455 |
| 11 | 15 | 66 | Dick Trickle | Cale Yarborough Motorsports | Pontiac | 365 | 0 | running | 130 | $11,360 |
| 12 | 16 | 75 | Rick Wilson | RahMoc Enterprises | Oldsmobile | 365 | 0 | running | 127 | $10,025 |
| 13 | 22 | 20 | Rob Moroso (R) | Moroso Racing | Oldsmobile | 365 | 0 | running | 124 | $9,085 |
| 14 | 24 | 1 | Terry Labonte | Precision Products Racing | Oldsmobile | 365 | 0 | running | 121 | $9,475 |
| 15 | 12 | 28 | Davey Allison | Robert Yates Racing | Ford | 364 | 0 | running | 118 | $14,290 |
| 16 | 17 | 71 | Dave Marcis | Marcis Auto Racing | Chevrolet | 364 | 3 | running | 120 | $8,875 |
| 17 | 29 | 41 | Larry Pearson | Larry Hedrick Motorsports | Chevrolet | 363 | 0 | running | 112 | $5,415 |
| 18 | 23 | 94 | Sterling Marlin | Hagan Racing | Oldsmobile | 362 | 0 | transmission | 109 | $8,370 |
| 19 | 28 | 29 | Phil Parsons | Diamond Ridge Motorsports | Pontiac | 362 | 0 | running | 106 | $5,120 |
| 20 | 34 | 12 | Hut Stricklin | Bobby Allison Motorsports | Buick | 361 | 0 | running | 103 | $7,792 |
| 21 | 14 | 15 | Morgan Shepherd | Bud Moore Engineering | Ford | 358 | 0 | running | 100 | $7,645 |
| 22 | 32 | 47 | Jack Pennington (R) | Close Racing | Oldsmobile | 357 | 0 | running | 97 | $4,840 |
| 23 | 36 | 57 | Jimmy Spencer | Osterlund Racing | Pontiac | 355 | 0 | running | 94 | $7,345 |
| 24 | 19 | 22 | Rick Mast | U.S. Racing | Pontiac | 354 | 0 | running | 91 | $4,375 |
| 25 | 13 | 42 | Kyle Petty | SABCO Racing | Pontiac | 332 | 0 | running | 88 | $12,630 |
| 26 | 30 | 30 | Michael Waltrip | Bahari Racing | Pontiac | 272 | 0 | accident | 85 | $6,890 |
| 27 | 39 | 2 | Charlie Glotzbach | U.S. Racing | Pontiac | 255 | 0 | engine | 82 | $6,050 |
| 28 | 18 | 21 | Dale Jarrett | Wood Brothers Racing | Ford | 241 | 1 | accident | 84 | $6,655 |
| 29 | 25 | 98 | Butch Miller | Travis Carter Enterprises | Chevrolet | 239 | 1 | accident | 81 | $4,540 |
| 30 | 26 | 17 | Greg Sacks | Hendrick Motorsports | Chevrolet | 227 | 0 | accident | 73 | $12,810 |
| 31 | 20 | 8 | Bobby Hillin Jr. | Stavola Brothers Racing | Buick | 227 | 0 | accident | 70 | $6,315 |
| 32 | 27 | 83 | Lake Speed | Speed Racing | Oldsmobile | 175 | 0 | engine | 67 | $3,605 |
| 33 | 40 | 82 | Mark Stahl | Stahl Racing | Ford | 112 | 0 | handling | 64 | $3,550 |
| 34 | 33 | 43 | Richard Petty | Petty Enterprises | Pontiac | 93 | 0 | engine | 61 | $4,120 |
| 35 | 35 | 19 | Chad Little | Little Racing | Ford | 91 | 0 | accident | 58 | $3,420 |
| 36 | 31 | 52 | Jimmy Means | Jimmy Means Racing | Pontiac | 91 | 0 | accident | 55 | $3,975 |
| 37 | 38 | 96 | Philip Duffie | Duffie Racing | Buick | 52 | 0 | handling | 52 | $3,320 |
| 38 | 37 | 36 | H. B. Bailey | Bailey Racing | Pontiac | 39 | 0 | accident | 49 | $3,265 |
| 39 | 21 | 25 | Ken Schrader | Hendrick Motorsports | Chevrolet | 31 | 0 | accident | 46 | $10,710 |
| 40 | 4 | 27 | Rusty Wallace | Blue Max Racing | Pontiac | 14 | 0 | engine | 43 | $14,400 |
Official race results

== Standings after the race ==
Drivers' Championship standings

| | Pos | Driver | Points |
|---|---|---|---|
| | 1 | Mark Martin | 3,169 |
| | 2 | Dale Earnhardt | 3,143 (-26) |
| | 3 | Geoff Bodine | 2,982 (-187) |
| | 4 | Rusty Wallace | 2,792 (–377) |
| | 5 | Bill Elliott | 2,761 (–408) |
| 1 | 6 | Ricky Rudd | 2,695 (–474) |
| 1 | 7 | Morgan Shepherd | 2,661 (–508) |
| | 8 | Kyle Petty | 2,618 (–551) |
| 1 | 9 | Ken Schrader | 2,587 (–582) |
| 1 | 10 | Ernie Irvan | 2,534 (–635) |
Official driver's standings

- Note: Only the first 10 positions are included for the driver standings.

| Previous race: 1990 Busch 500 | NASCAR Winston Cup Series; 1990 season | Next race: 1990 Miller Genuine Draft 400 (Richmond) |
