= Randy Baker =

Racecar driver

- Born: May 14, 1958 (age 68); Charlotte, North Carolina, U.S.

NASCAR Cup Series career
- 14 races run over 9 years
- Best finish: 54th (1984)
- First race: 1982 Warner W. Hodgdon American 500 (Rockingham)
- Last race: 1996 NAPA 500 (Atlanta)
Wins	Top tens	Poles
0	0	0

NASCAR O'Reilly Auto Parts Series career
- 5 races run over 2 years
- Best finish: 68th (1989)
- First race: 1989 Gatorade 200 (Darlington)
- Last race: 1990 Champion 300 (Charlotte)
Wins	Top tens	Poles
0	0	0

Randy Baker (born May 14, 1958) is an American stock car racing driver. Son of Winston Cup champion Buck Baker, he competed in NASCAR's top divisions in the 1980s and 1990s, and currently operates a driving school.

== Career ==
Baker made his racing debut in 1976 at Thunder Valley Speedway in Leesville, South Carolina; he finished 10th in his first Limited Sportsman race. He made his debut in NASCAR's top series, then known as the Winston Cup Series, in 1982 at North Carolina Motor Speedway, finishing twentieth in a family-owned Pontiac. Baker would run in a total of fourteen Winston Cup races in his career, with a best finish of 17th at the 1987 Coca-Cola 600 Charlotte Motor Speedway. Baker also competed in five races in the NASCAR Busch Series, now the Xfinity Series, in 1989 and 1990, posting a best finish of 22nd at North Carolina Motor Speedway. Baker's final NASCAR start was at Atlanta Motor Speedway in the Winston Cup Series in November 1996; driving for Miles Motorsports, he completed 51 laps before crashing out of the race, finishing 41st.

Baker also competed in Automobile Racing Club of America competition; in 1986 he was injured in a crash at Daytona International Speedway in the Speedweeks ARCA 200.

Baker's last start in racing competition came in an ARCA event in 2008 at Kentucky Speedway; in 2009 he fielded a race team in ARCA for John Ferrier.

== Personal life ==
Baker is the son of two-time NASCAR Winston Cup Series champion Buck Baker and the brother of 1980 Daytona 500 winner Buddy Baker. He operates SpeedTech Racing Schools.

== Motorsports career results ==
=== NASCAR ===
(key) (Bold - Pole position awarded by qualifying time. Italics - Pole position earned by points standings or practice time. * – Most laps led.)

==== Winston Cup Series ====
NASCAR Winston Cup Series results
Year	Team	No.	Make	1	2	3	4	5	6	7	8	9	10	11	12	13	14	15	16	17	18	19	20	21	22	23	24	25	26	27	28	29	30	31	NWCC	Pts	Ref
1982	Buck Baker Racing	87	Pontiac	DAY	RCH	BRI	ATL	CAR	DAR	NWS	MAR	TAL	NSV	DOV	CLT	POC	RSD	MCH	DAY	NSV	POC	TAL	MCH	BRI	DAR	RCH	DOV	NWS	CLT	MAR	CAR; 20	ATL	RSD		84th	103	
1983				DAY	RCH	CAR	ATL	DAR	NWS	MAR	TAL	NSV	DOV	BRI	CLT	RSD	POC	MCH	DAY	NSV	POC	TAL	MCH	BRI	DAR	RCH	DOV	MAR	NWS	CLT; DNQ	CAR	ATL	RSD		NA	0	
1984	Buck Baker Racing	87	Buick	DAY; DNQ	RCH	CAR	ATL	BRI	NWS	DAR	MAR	TAL	NSV	DOV	CLT; 24	RSD	POC	MCH	DAY	NSV	POC	TAL; 39	MCH	BRI	DAR; 27	RCH	DOV	MAR	CLT	NWS	CAR	ATL	RSD		54th	219	
1985	Buck Baker Racing	87	Buick	DAY	RCH	CAR	ATL	BRI	DAR	NWS	MAR	TAL	DOV	CLT	RSD	POC	MCH	DAY; DNQ	POC	TAL	MCH	BRI	DAR	RCH	DOV	MAR	NWS; DNQ	CLT	CAR; 21	ATL	RSD				85th	100	
1986	Buck Baker Racing	87	Chevy	DAY	RCH	CAR	ATL	BRI	DAR	NWS	MAR	TAL	DOV	CLT	RSD	POC	MCH	DAY	POC	TAL	GLN	MCH	BRI	DAR	RCH	DOV	MAR	NWS	CLT; 42	CAR	ATL; 22	RSD			83rd	134	
1987	Buck Baker Racing	87	Chevy	DAY	CAR	RCH	ATL	DAR	NWS	BRI	MAR	TAL	CLT; 17	DOV	POC	RSD	MCH	DAY	POC	TAL	GLN	MCH	BRI	DAR	RCH	DOV	MAR	NWS	CLT; DNQ	CAR	RSD	ATL; 20			62nd	215	
1988	Buck Baker Racing	87	Olds	DAY	RCH	CAR	ATL	DAR	BRI	NWS	MAR	TAL	CLT	DOV	RSD	POC	MCH	DAY	POC	TAL	GLN	MCH	BRI	DAR; 36	RCH	DOV	MAR	CLT; DNQ	NWS	CAR	PHO	ATL			82nd	55	
1991	Buck Baker Racing	87	Chevy	DAY	RCH	CAR	ATL	DAR; 28	BRI	NWS	MAR	TAL	CLT	DOV	SON	POC	MCH	DAY	POC	TAL	GLN	MCH	BRI	DAR; 26	RCH	DOV	MAR	NWS	CLT; DNQ	CAR	PHO	ATL			58th	164	
1992	Buck Baker Racing	87	Chevy	DAY	CAR; 25	RCH	ATL	DAR; DNQ	BRI	NWS	MAR	TAL	CLT	DOV	SON	POC	MCH	DAY	POC	TAL	GLN	MCH	BRI	DAR	RCH	DOV	MAR	NWS	CLT	CAR	PHO	ATL			75th	88	
1996	Miles Motorsports	02	Chevy	DAY	CAR	RCH	ATL	DAR	BRI	NWS	MAR	TAL	SON	CLT	DOV	POC	MCH	DAY	NHA	POC	TAL	IND	GLN	MCH	BRI	DAR	RCH	DOV	MAR	NWS	CLT	CAR	PHO	ATL; 41	67th	40	

===== Daytona 500 =====
Year	Team	Manufacturer	Start	Finish
1984	Buck Baker Racing	Buick	DNQ	

==== Busch Series ====
NASCAR Busch Series results
Year	Team	No.	Make	1	2	3	4	5	6	7	8	9	10	11	12	13	14	15	16	17	18	19	20	21	22	23	24	25	26	27	28	29	30	31	NBSC	Pts	Ref
1989		13	Pontiac	DAY	CAR	MAR	HCY	DAR	BRI	NZH	SBO	LAN	NSV	CLT	DOV	ROU	LVL	VOL	MYB	SBO	HCY	DUB	IRP	ROU	BRI	DAR; 31	RCH	DOV	MAR	CLT; 33	CAR; 22	MAR			68th	231	
1990		88	Pontiac	DAY	RCH	CAR; 39	MAR	HCY	DAR	BRI	LAN	SBO	NZH	HCY	CLT; 42	DOV	ROU	VOL	MYB	OXF	NHA	SBO	DUB	IRP	ROU	BRI	DAR	RCH	DOV	MAR	CLT	NHA	CAR; DNQ	MAR	96th	83	
