= Mark Stahl =

American off-road and stock car racing driver (born 1951)

- Nationality: (United States) American
- Born: August 12, 1951 (age 75) San Diego, California, U.S.
- Retired: 2001

ARCA Re/MAX Series
- Years active: 1988–2001
- Car number: 32
- Starts: 48
- Wins: 0
- Poles: 0
- Best finish: 20th in 1998

Previous series
- 1981–1993 1981–1982: NASCAR Winston Cup Series; NASCAR Winston West Series

Championship titles
- 1978, 1980 1981, 2007, 2015, 2016: Baja 1000 Overall Winner; Baja 1000 Class Winner

NASCAR Cup Series career
- 30 races run over 13 years
- Best finish: 38th (1987)
- First race: 1981 Winston Western 500 (Riverside)
- Last race: 1991 AC Delco 500 (Rockingham)
Wins	Top tens	Poles
0	0	0

Mark Stahl (born August 12, 1951) is an American former professional off-road and stock car racing driver. He competed in the NASCAR Winston Cup Series and the ARCA Re/MAX Series, and is a four-time winner of the Baja 1000 off-road race, twice winning the event overall.

== Career ==
Born in San Diego, California, Stahl began his professional racing career in off-road racing; he scored overall wins in the Baja 1000 in his Chenowth VW in 1978 and 1980, and the car won just Class 1 (but not overall) in 1981. Stahl battled Frank "Scoop" Vessels for the win of the 1978 Baja 1000 and Vessels crossed the finish line three minutes ahead of Stahl - but had started nine minutes earlier - giving the victory to Stahl by six minutes.

Stahl moved to stock cars 1981, competing in the NASCAR Winston West Series; he competed in a majority of the races in 1982, finishing twelfth in points. Stahl also made his debut in the Winston Cup Series in 1981, driving in the Winston Western 500 at Riverside International Raceway, finishing 23rd.

Stahl competed in thirty races in the Winston Cup Series between 1981 and 1993; his best finish was sixteenth in 1986 at Darlington Raceway. He also failed to qualify for 34 additional events. In 1987, Stahl posted the fastest time in second-round qualifying for the 1987 Winston 500, becoming part of the fastest field in NASCAR history. He moved to South Carolina in 1991 to further his racing career. In 1990, Stahl acquired sponsorship from Hooters; his failing to qualify for the 1991 Motorcraft 500 at Atlanta International Raceway led to 1992 Winston Cup Series Champion Alan Kulwicki picking up the sponsorship for the event, and later receiving the sponsorship full-time. Stahl left NASCAR with more DNQs (34) than races run (30).

In 1988, Stahl made his debut in the Automobile Racing Club of America's Permatex SuperCar Series; he competed in 48 ARCA events between 1988 and 2001, posting a best finish of fourth at Talladega Superspeedway in 1997.

Following the 2001 racing season, Stahl retired from competition; in 2007, he came out of retirement to compete in the Baja 1000 once more, co-driving with Jim Christensen and winning the Touring Car class of the race. His 1977 Chenowth was restored by another driver for the 2011 NORRA Mexican 1000 vintage race and Stahl co-drove in the May event.

== Motorsports career results ==
=== NASCAR ===
(key) (Bold – Pole position awarded by qualifying time. Italics – Pole position earned by points standings or practice time. * – Most laps led.)

==== Winston Cup Series ====
NASCAR Winston Cup Series results
Year	Team	No.	Make	1	2	3	4	5	6	7	8	9	10	11	12	13	14	15	16	17	18	19	20	21	22	23	24	25	26	27	28	29	30	31	NWCC	Pts	Ref
1981	Stahl Racing	85	Ford	RSD	DAY	RCH	CAR	ATL	BRI	NWS	DAR	MAR	TAL	NSV	DOV	CLT	TWS	RSD	MCH	DAY	NSV	POC	TAL	MCH	BRI	DAR	RCH	DOV	MAR	NWS	CLT	CAR	ATL	RSD; 23	84th	94	
1982	Stahl Racing	85	Ford	DAY	RCH	BRI	ATL	CAR	DAR	NWS	MAR	TAL	NSV	DOV	CLT	POC	RSD; 22	MCH	DAY	NSV	POC	TAL	MCH	BRI	DAR	RCH	DOV	NWS	CLT	MAR	CAR	ATL			72nd	143	
1982	Langley Racing	64	Ford																														RSD; 39		72nd	143	
1983	Stahl Racing	82	Ford	DAY	RCH	CAR	ATL	DAR	NWS	MAR	TAL	NSV	DOV	BRI	CLT	RSD	POC	MCH	DAY	NSV	POC	TAL	MCH	BRI	DAR	RCH	DOV	MAR; 23	NWS; 23	CLT	CAR	ATL; DNQ	RSD		66th	188	
1984	Stahl Racing	82	Ford	DAY; DNQ	RCH	CAR; 18	ATL	BRI	NWS	DAR	MAR	TAL	NSV	DOV	CLT	RSD	POC	MCH	DAY	NSV	POC	TAL	MCH	BRI	DAR; DNQ	RCH	DOV	MAR	CLT; DNQ	NWS	CAR; 27	ATL; 38	RSD		52nd	240	
1985	Stahl Racing	82	Ford	DAY; DNQ	RCH	CAR	ATL	BRI	DAR	NWS	MAR	TAL; DNQ	DOV	CLT; 21	RSD	POC	MCH	DAY	POC	TAL	MCH	BRI	DAR	RCH	DOV	MAR	NWS	CLT	CAR	ATL	RSD				78th	100	
1986	Stahl Racing	82	Ford	DAY; DNQ	RCH	CAR	ATL	BRI	DAR; 16	NWS	MAR	TAL	DOV	CLT; DNQ	RSD	POC	MCH; DNQ	DAY	POC	TAL	GLN	MCH	BRI	DAR; 32	RCH	DOV	MAR	NWS	CLT; DNQ	CAR; 30	ATL; DNQ	RSD			62nd	255	
1987	Stahl Racing	82	Ford	DAY; 38	CAR; 33	RCH	ATL; 30	DAR; DNQ	NWS	BRI	MAR	TAL; 17	CLT; DNQ	DOV	POC	RSD	MCH	DAY; 37	POC	TAL; 33	GLN	MCH	BRI	DAR	RCH	DOV	MAR	NWS	CLT; 23	CAR; 28	RSD	ATL; 21			38th	687	
1988	Stahl Racing	82	Ford	DAY; DNQ	RCH	CAR; 37	ATL	DAR	BRI	NWS	MAR	TAL	CLT; DNQ	DOV	RSD	POC	MCH	DAY	POC	TAL	GLN	MCH	BRI	DAR	RCH	DOV	MAR	CLT	NWS	CAR	PHO	ATL			86th	52	
1989	Stahl Racing	82	Ford	DAY	CAR	ATL	RCH	DAR	BRI	NWS	MAR	TAL	CLT	DOV	SON	POC	MCH	DAY	POC	TAL; 27	GLN	MCH	BRI	DAR	RCH	DOV	MAR	CLT	NWS	CAR; DNQ	PHO	ATL			81st	82	
1990	Stahl Racing	82	Ford	DAY; DNQ	RCH	CAR; 24	ATL; 28	DAR; DNQ	BRI	NWS	MAR	TAL; DNQ	CLT; DNQ	DOV	SON	POC	MCH	DAY; DNQ	POC	TAL; 31	GLN	MCH	BRI	DAR; 33	RCH	DOV	MAR	NWS	CLT; 32	CAR; DNQ	PHO	ATL; DNQ			44th	371	
1991	Stahl Racing	82	Ford	DAY; DNQ	RCH; DNQ	CAR; DNQ	ATL; DNQ	DAR; DNQ	BRI	NWS	MAR	TAL	CLT; DNQ	DOV	SON	POC	MCH; DNQ	DAY	POC	TAL	GLN	MCH; DNQ	BRI	DAR; 37	RCH	DOV	MAR	NWS	CLT	CAR; 36	PHO	ATL			67th	107	
1992	Stahl Racing	82	Ford	DAY	CAR	RCH	ATL	DAR	BRI	NWS	MAR	TAL	CLT	DOV	SON	POC	MCH	DAY	POC	TAL	GLN	MCH	BRI	DAR	RCH	DOV	MAR	NWS	CLT; DNQ	CAR	PHO	ATL; DNQ			NA	0	
1993	Stahl Racing	82	Ford	DAY	CAR	RCH	ATL	DAR	BRI	NWS	MAR	TAL	SON	CLT	DOV	POC	MCH	DAY; DNQ	NHA	POC	TAL	GLN	MCH	BRI	DAR	RCH	DOV	MAR	NWS	CLT	CAR	PHO	ATL		NA	0	

=== ARCA Re/Max Series ===
(key) (Bold – Pole position awarded by qualifying time. Italics – Pole position earned by points standings or practice time. * – Most laps led.)

ARCA Re/Max Series results
Year	Team	No.	Make	1	2	3	4	5	6	7	8	9	10	11	12	13	14	15	16	17	18	19	20	21	22	23	24	25	ARMC	Pts	Ref
1988	Stahl Racing	82	Ford	DAY	ATL	TAL	FRS	PCS	ROC	POC	WIN	KIL	ACS	SLM	POC	TAL	DEL	FRS	ISF	DSF	SLM	ATL; 40							128th	-	
1989	Stahl Racing	82	Ford	DAY	ATL	KIL	TAL; 33	FRS	POC	KIL	HAG	POC	TAL	DEL	FRS	ISF	TOL	DSF	SLM	ATL									129th	-	
1994	Stahl Racing	32	Ford	DAY; 10	TAL; 12	FIF	LVL	KIL	TOL	FRS	MCH	DMS	POC	POC	KIL	FRS	INF	I70	ISF	DSF	TOL	SLM	WIN	ATL; 11					77th	775	
1995	Stahl Racing	32	Ford	DAY; 8	ATL; 32	TAL; 5	FIF	KIL	FRS	MCH	I80	MCS	FRS	POC	POC	KIL	FRS	SBS	LVL	ISF	DSF	SLM	WIN	ATL; 7					36th	930	
1996	Stahl Racing	32	Ford	DAY; 7	ATL; 18	SLM	TAL; 20	FIF	LVL	CLT; 33	CLT; 13	KIL	FRS	POC	MCH	FRS	TOL	POC	MCH	INF	SBS	ISF	DSF	KIL	SLM	WIN	CLT; 28	ATL; 7	35th	-	
1997	Stahl Racing	32	Ford	DAY; 5	ATL; 16	SLM	CLT; 19	CLT; 14	POC	MCH	SBS	TOL	KIL	FRS	MIN	POC	MCH	DSF	GTW	SLM	WIN	CLT; DNQ	TAL; 4	ISF	ATL; 21				41st	-	
1998	Stahl Racing	32	Ford	DAY; DNQ	ATL; 18	SLM	CLT	MEM	MCH; 28	POC; 36	SBS	TOL	PPR	POC; 7	KIL	FRS	ISF	ATL; 14	DSF	SLM	TEX; 11	WIN	CLT; 20	TAL; 8	ATL; 14				20th	1590	
1999	Stahl Racing	32	Ford	DAY; 9	ATL; 18	SLM	AND	CLT; 25	MCH; 19	POC; 24	TOL	SBS	BLN	POC; 17	KIL	FRS	FLM; 22	ISF	WIN	DSF	SLM	CLT; DNQ	TAL; 21	ATL; 25					29th	1195	
2000	Stahl Racing	32	Ford	DAY; 30	SLM	AND	CLT; DNQ	KIL	FRS	MCH; DNQ	POC; 26	TOL	KEN; 21	BLN	POC; 21	WIN	ISF	KEN; 20	DSF	SLM	CLT; DNQ	TAL; 21	ATL; 18						37th	900	
2001	Stahl Racing	32	Ford	DAY; 40	NSH	WIN	SLM	GTY	KEN	CLT	KAN	MCH	POC	MEM	GLN	KEN	MCH	POC	NSH	ISF	CHI	DSF	SLM	TOL	BLN	CLT	TAL	ATL	188th	30	
