= 1988 Southern 500 =

21st race of the 1988 NASCAR Winston Cup Series

Race details
- Race 21 of 29 in the 1988 NASCAR Winston Cup Series
- The 1988 Southern 500 program cover, featuring Dale Earnhardt.
- Date: September 4, 1988
- Official name: 39th Annual Southern 500
- Location: Darlington Raceway, Darlington, South Carolina
- Course: Permanent racing facility
- Course length: 1.366 miles (2.198 km)
- Distance: 367 laps, 501.322 mi (806.799 km)
- Average speed: 128.297 miles per hour (206.474 km/h)
- Attendance: 50,000

Pole position
Driver	Bill Elliott	Melling Racing
- Time: 30.577

Most laps led
Driver	Bill Elliott	Melling Racing
- Laps: 154

Winner
No. 9	Bill Elliott	Melling Racing

Television in the United States
- Network: ESPN
- Announcers: Bob Jenkins, Ned Jarrett, Gary Nelson

Radio in the United States
- Radio: Motor Racing Network

The 1988 Southern 500 was the 21st stock car race of the 1988 NASCAR Winston Cup Series season and the 39th iteration of the event. The race was held on Sunday, September 4, 1988, before an audience of 50,000 in Darlington, South Carolina, at Darlington Raceway, a 1.366 miles (2.198 km) permanent egg-shaped oval racetrack. The race took the scheduled 367 laps to complete. In the final laps of the race, Melling Racing's Bill Elliott would manage to fend off Blue Max Racing's Rusty Wallace to the finish to take his 28th career NASCAR Winston Cup Series victory and his fifth victory of the season. To fill out the top three, the aforementioned Rusty Wallace and Richard Childress Racing's Dale Earnhardt would finish second and third, respectively.

== Background ==
The layout of Darlington Raceway, the venue where the race was held.

Darlington Raceway is a race track built for NASCAR racing located near Darlington, South Carolina. It is nicknamed "The Lady in Black" and "The Track Too Tough to Tame" by many NASCAR fans and drivers and advertised as "A NASCAR Tradition." It is of a unique, somewhat egg-shaped design, an oval with the ends of very different configurations, a condition which supposedly arose from the proximity of one end of the track to a minnow pond the owner refused to relocate. This situation makes it very challenging for the crews to set up their cars' handling in a way that is effective at both ends.

=== Entry list ===
- (R) denotes rookie driver.

#	Driver	Team	Make
2	Ernie Irvan (R)	U.S. Racing	Chevrolet
3	Dale Earnhardt	Richard Childress Racing	Chevrolet
4	Rick Wilson	Morgan–McClure Motorsports	Oldsmobile
04	Hershel McGriff	McGriff Racing	Pontiac
5	Geoff Bodine	Hendrick Motorsports	Chevrolet
6	Mark Martin	Roush Racing	Ford
7	Alan Kulwicki	AK Racing	Ford
8	Bobby Hillin Jr.	Stavola Brothers Racing	Buick
9	Bill Elliott	Melling Racing	Ford
10	Ken Bouchard (R)	Whitcomb Racing	Ford
11	Terry Labonte	Junior Johnson & Associates	Chevrolet
12	Mike Alexander	Stavola Brothers Racing	Buick
15	Brett Bodine	Bud Moore Engineering	Ford
17	Darrell Waltrip	Hendrick Motorsports	Chevrolet
21	Kyle Petty	Wood Brothers Racing	Ford
23	Eddie Bierschwale	B&B Racing	Oldsmobile
25	Ken Schrader	Hendrick Motorsports	Chevrolet
26	Ricky Rudd	King Racing	Buick
27	Rusty Wallace	Blue Max Racing	Pontiac
28	Davey Allison	Ranier-Lundy Racing	Ford
29	Dale Jarrett	Cale Yarborough Motorsports	Oldsmobile
30	Michael Waltrip	Bahari Racing	Pontiac
31	Jim Sauter	Bob Clark Motorsports	Oldsmobile
32	Philip Duffie	Duffie Racing	Buick
33	Harry Gant	Mach 1 Racing	Chevrolet
36	H. B. Bailey	Bailey Racing	Pontiac
43	Richard Petty	Petty Enterprises	Pontiac
44	Sterling Marlin	Hagan Racing	Oldsmobile
52	Jimmy Means	Jimmy Means Racing	Pontiac
55	Phil Parsons	Jackson Bros. Motorsports	Oldsmobile
57	Morgan Shepherd	Osterlund Racing	Buick
68	Derrike Cope	Testa Racing	Ford
71	Dave Marcis	Marcis Auto Racing	Chevrolet
75	Neil Bonnett	RahMoc Enterprises	Pontiac
77	Ken Ragan	Ragan Racing	Ford
80	Jimmy Horton (R)	S&H Racing	Ford
83	Lake Speed	Speed Racing	Oldsmobile
87	Randy Baker	Buck Baker Racing	Oldsmobile
88	Rick Mast	Baker-Schiff Racing	Oldsmobile
90	Benny Parsons	Donlavey Racing	Ford
97	Rodney Combs	Winkle Motorsports	Buick
98	Brad Noffsinger (R)	Curb Racing	Buick

== Qualifying ==
Qualifying was split into two rounds. The first round was held on Thursday, September 1, at 3:00 PM EST. Each driver would have one lap to set a time. During the first round, the top 20 drivers in the round would be guaranteed a starting spot in the race. If a driver was not able to guarantee a spot in the first round, they had the option to scrub their time from the first round and try and run a faster lap time in a second round qualifying run, held on Friday, September 2, at 2:00 PM EST. As with the first round, each driver would have one lap to set a time. For this specific race, positions 21-40 would be decided on time and depending on who needed it, a select amount of positions were given to cars who had not otherwise qualified on time but were high enough in owner's points; up to two provisionals were given.

Bill Elliott, driving for Melling Racing, would win the pole, setting a time of 30.577 and an average speed of 160.827 miles per hour (258.826 km/h) in the first round.

Two drivers would fail to qualify.

=== Full qualifying results ===
Pos.	#	Driver	Team	Make	Time	Speed
1	9	Bill Elliott	Melling Racing	Ford	30.577	160.827
2	3	Dale Earnhardt	Richard Childress Racing	Chevrolet	30.697	160.198
3	7	Alan Kulwicki	AK Racing	Ford	30.704	160.162
4	5	Geoff Bodine	Hendrick Motorsports	Chevrolet	30.750	159.922
5	27	Rusty Wallace	Blue Max Racing	Pontiac	30.781	159.761
6	17	Darrell Waltrip	Hendrick Motorsports	Chevrolet	30.803	159.647
7	6	Mark Martin	Roush Racing	Ford	30.929	158.996
8	15	Brett Bodine	Bud Moore Engineering	Ford	30.989	158.689
9	33	Harry Gant	Mach 1 Racing	Chevrolet	31.007	158.596
10	57	Morgan Shepherd	Osterlund Racing	Buick	31.085	158.198
11	83	Lake Speed	Speed Racing	Oldsmobile	31.115	158.046
12	44	Sterling Marlin	Hagan Racing	Oldsmobile	31.124	158.000
13	97	Rodney Combs	Winkle Motorsports	Buick	31.145	157.894
14	30	Michael Waltrip	Bahari Racing	Pontiac	31.165	157.792
15	28	Davey Allison	Ranier-Lundy Racing	Ford	31.172	157.757
16	8	Bobby Hillin Jr.	Stavola Brothers Racing	Buick	31.190	157.666
17	2	Ernie Irvan (R)	U.S. Racing	Chevrolet	31.213	157.550
18	29	Dale Jarrett	Cale Yarborough Motorsports	Oldsmobile	31.222	157.504
19	4	Rick Wilson	Morgan–McClure Motorsports	Oldsmobile	31.247	157.378
20	77	Ken Ragan	Ragan Racing	Ford	31.251	157.358
Failed to lock in Round 1
21	55	Phil Parsons	Jackson Bros. Motorsports	Oldsmobile	31.256	157.333
22	88	Rick Mast	Baker–Schiff Racing	Oldsmobile	31.265	157.288
23	11	Terry Labonte	Junior Johnson & Associates	Chevrolet	31.296	157.132
24	75	Neil Bonnett	RahMoc Enterprises	Pontiac	31.328	156.971
25	25	Ken Schrader	Hendrick Motorsports	Chevrolet	31.333	156.946
26	43	Richard Petty	Petty Enterprises	Pontiac	31.343	156.896
27	90	Benny Parsons	Donlavey Racing	Ford	31.350	156.861
28	52	Jimmy Means	Jimmy Means Racing	Pontiac	31.391	156.656
29	26	Ricky Rudd	King Racing	Buick	31.415	156.537
30	12	Mike Alexander	Stavola Brothers Racing	Buick	31.419	156.517
31	68	Derrike Cope	Testa Racing	Ford	31.432	156.452
32	31	Jim Sauter	Bob Clark Motorsports	Oldsmobile	31.493	156.149
33	23	Eddie Bierschwale	B&B Racing	Oldsmobile	31.539	155.921
34	36	H. B. Bailey	Bailey Racing	Pontiac	31.582	155.709
35	21	Kyle Petty	Wood Brothers Racing	Ford	31.602	155.610
36	10	Ken Bouchard (R)	Whitcomb Racing	Ford	31.617	155.537
37	87	Randy Baker	Buck Baker Racing	Oldsmobile	31.733	154.968
38	71	Dave Marcis	Marcis Auto Racing	Chevrolet	31.748	154.896
39	32	Philip Duffie	Duffie Racing	Buick	31.886	154.224
40	80	Jimmy Horton (R)	S&H Racing	Ford	31.922	154.050
Failed to qualify
41	98	Brad Noffsinger (R)	Curb Racing	Buick	-*	-*
42	04	Hershel McGriff	McGriff Racing	Pontiac	32.292	152.285
Official first round qualifying results
Official starting lineup

== Race results ==
Fin	St	#	Driver	Team	Make	Laps	Led	Status	Pts	Winnings
1	1	9	Bill Elliott	Melling Racing	Ford	367	154	running	185	$75,800
2	5	27	Rusty Wallace	Blue Max Racing	Pontiac	367	50	running	175	$38,850
3	2	3	Dale Earnhardt	Richard Childress Racing	Chevrolet	367	85	running	170	$31,375
4	6	17	Darrell Waltrip	Hendrick Motorsports	Chevrolet	367	5	running	165	$19,850
5	12	44	Sterling Marlin	Hagan Racing	Oldsmobile	367	21	running	160	$21,130
6	21	55	Phil Parsons	Jackson Bros. Motorsports	Oldsmobile	366	0	running	150	$12,950
7	4	5	Geoff Bodine	Hendrick Motorsports	Chevrolet	366	7	running	151	$11,310
8	23	11	Terry Labonte	Junior Johnson & Associates	Chevrolet	366	0	running	142	$13,260
9	15	28	Davey Allison	Ranier-Lundy Racing	Ford	366	9	running	143	$15,105
10	29	26	Ricky Rudd	King Racing	Buick	366	6	running	139	$13,130
11	25	25	Ken Schrader	Hendrick Motorsports	Chevrolet	366	0	running	130	$10,980
12	11	83	Lake Speed	Speed Racing	Oldsmobile	366	0	running	127	$6,815
13	27	90	Benny Parsons	Donlavey Racing	Ford	365	25	running	129	$19,305
14	30	12	Mike Alexander	Stavola Brothers Racing	Buick	365	2	running	126	$11,495
15	3	7	Alan Kulwicki	AK Racing	Ford	365	0	running	118	$8,735
16	24	75	Neil Bonnett	RahMoc Enterprises	Pontiac	364	0	running	115	$11,195
17	8	15	Brett Bodine	Bud Moore Engineering	Ford	363	2	running	117	$12,635
18	36	10	Ken Bouchard (R)	Whitcomb Racing	Ford	360	0	running	109	$6,240
19	7	6	Mark Martin	Roush Racing	Ford	358	0	running	106	$5,040
20	17	2	Ernie Irvan (R)	U.S. Racing	Chevrolet	358	0	running	103	$4,985
21	13	97	Rodney Combs	Winkle Motorsports	Buick	357	0	running	100	$3,320
22	38	71	Dave Marcis	Marcis Auto Racing	Chevrolet	355	0	running	97	$6,320
23	32	31	Jim Sauter	Bob Clark Motorsports	Oldsmobile	351	0	running	0	$4,120
24	28	52	Jimmy Means	Jimmy Means Racing	Pontiac	350	0	running	91	$5,000
25	14	30	Michael Waltrip	Bahari Racing	Pontiac	343	0	running	88	$5,955
26	33	23	Eddie Bierschwale	B&B Racing	Oldsmobile	340	0	running	85	$2,815
27	34	36	H. B. Bailey	Bailey Racing	Pontiac	340	0	running	82	$2,725
28	35	21	Kyle Petty	Wood Brothers Racing	Ford	337	1	running	84	$9,630
29	39	32	Philip Duffie	Duffie Racing	Buick	332	0	running	76	$2,540
30	16	8	Bobby Hillin Jr.	Stavola Brothers Racing	Buick	317	0	oil pressure	73	$5,335
31	20	77	Ken Ragan	Ragan Racing	Ford	308	0	accident	70	$2,340
32	22	88	Rick Mast	Baker–Schiff Racing	Oldsmobile	305	0	running	0	$5,530
33	26	43	Richard Petty	Petty Enterprises	Pontiac	266	0	engine	64	$4,925
34	18	29	Dale Jarrett	Cale Yarborough Motorsports	Oldsmobile	239	0	engine	61	$2,850
35	31	68	Derrike Cope	Testa Racing	Ford	203	0	accident	58	$4,755
36	37	87	Randy Baker	Buck Baker Racing	Oldsmobile	135	0	engine	55	$2,055
37	40	80	Jimmy Horton (R)	S&H Racing	Ford	114	0	engine	52	$2,005
38	19	4	Rick Wilson	Morgan–McClure Motorsports	Oldsmobile	82	0	engine	49	$2,580
39	10	57	Morgan Shepherd	Osterlund Racing	Buick	53	0	engine	46	$1,910
40	9	33	Harry Gant	Mach 1 Racing	Chevrolet	50	0	engine	43	$4,450
Official race results

== Standings after the race ==
Drivers' Championship standings

	Pos	Driver	Points
	1	Bill Elliott	3,212
	2	Rusty Wallace	3,186 (-26)
	3	Dale Earnhardt	3,071 (-141)
	4	Ken Schrader	2,832 (–380)
	5	Terry Labonte	2,796 (–416)
	6	Geoff Bodine	2,791 (–421)
	7	Sterling Marlin	2,704 (–508)
1	8	Darrell Waltrip	2,669 (–543)
1	9	Phil Parsons	2,661 (–551)
1	10	Davey Allison	2,509 (–703)
Official driver's standings

- Note: Only the first 10 positions are included for the driver standings.

Previous race: 1988 Busch 500	NASCAR Winston Cup Series; 1988 season	Next race: 1988 Miller High Life 400 (Richmond)
