= Jimmy Horton =

American racing driver (born 1956)

- Born: James Horton III; July 3, 1956 (age 70) Folsom, New Jersey, U.S.

Modified racing career
- Debut season: 1972
- Car number: 43
- Wins: 457

Championship titles
- 1989 New York State Fair Champion; 2006 Race of Champions Dirt Modified Tour (South)

Awards
- 1990 EMPA Al Holbert National Driver of the Year

NASCAR Cup Series career
- 48 races run over 8 years
- Best finish: 36th (1990)
- First race: 1987 Miller High Life 500 (Pocono)
- Last race: 1995 UAW-GM Teamwork 500 (Pocono)
Wins	Top tens	Poles
0	0	0

NASCAR O'Reilly Auto Parts Series career
- 7 races run over 4 years
- Best finish: 47th (1987)
- First race: 1985 Goody's 300 (Daytona)
- Last race: 1989 Gatorade 200 (Darlington)
Wins	Top tens	Poles
0	0	0

ARCA Menards Series career
- 35 races run over 8 years
- First race: 1988 Daytona ARCA 200
- Last race: 1995 Atlanta Motor Speedway
- First win: 1990 Daytona ARCA 200
- Last win: 1995 Atlanta Motor Speedway
Wins	Top tens	Poles
8	15	4

James Horton III (born July 3, 1956) is an American businessman who owns a radiator and chassis shop after a Northeast Dirt Modified Hall of Fame career racing dirt modifieds. He raced in 48 NASCAR Winston Cup races in eight seasons. He was a regular on the ARCA circuit in the 1980s and 1990s. Horton has won many of the most noted races for dirt track modifieds in the Northeastern United States.

== Racing career ==
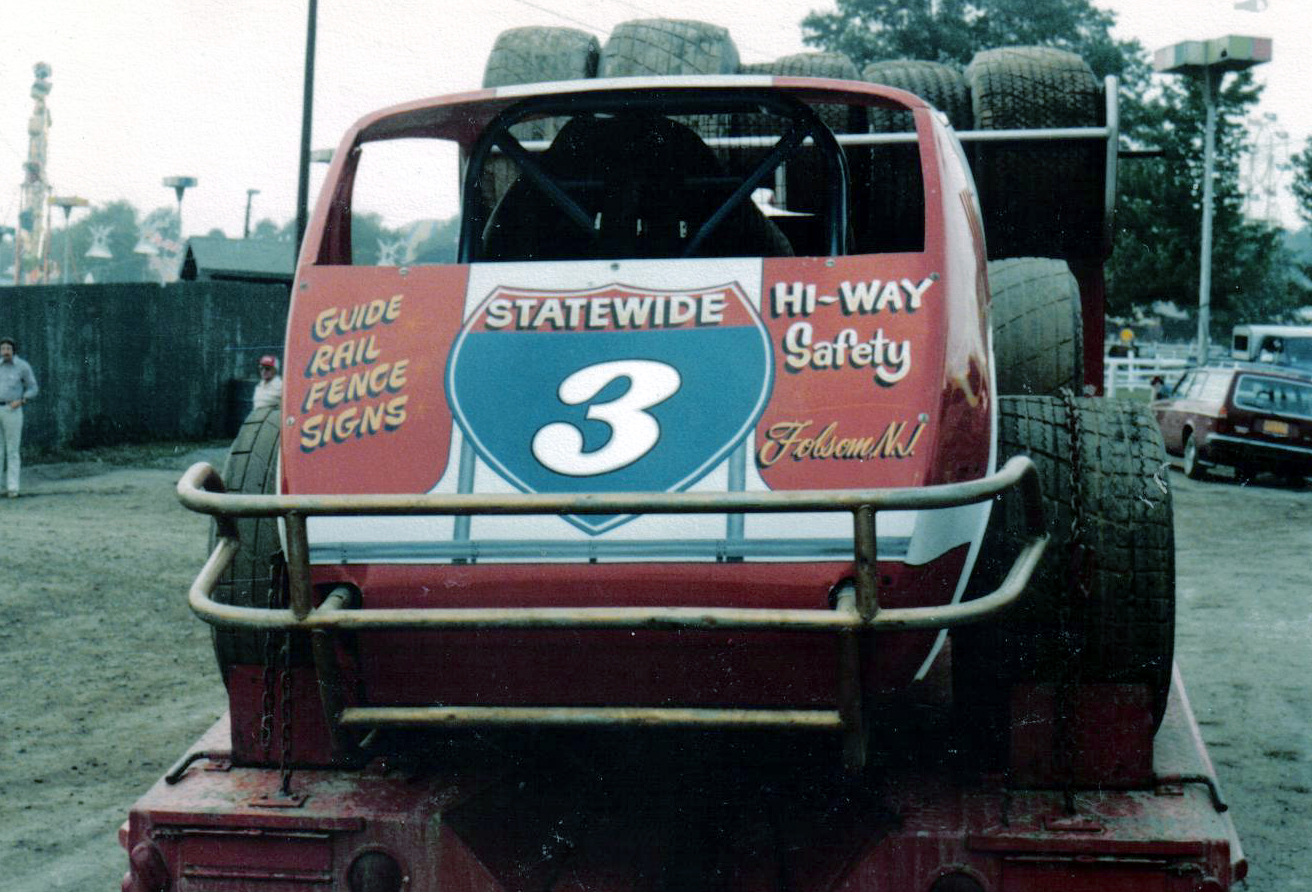
Horton's No. 3 dirt Modified

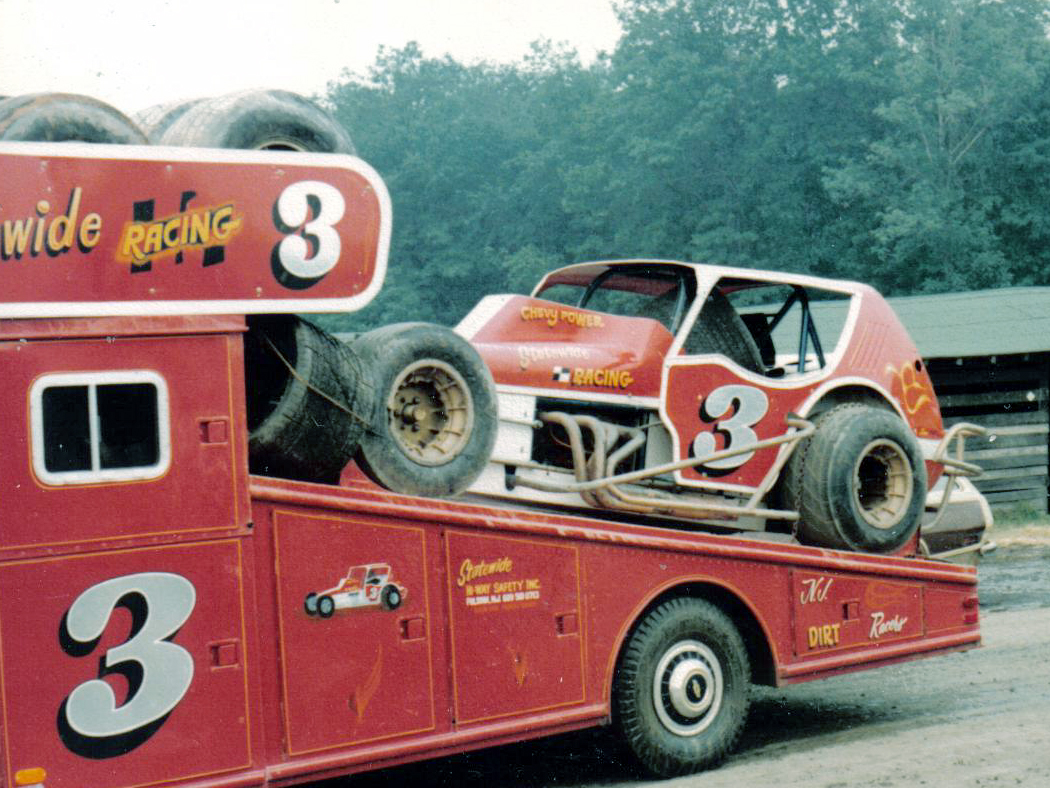
Horton's No. 3 dirt Modified

=== Local racer ===
Horton first became known as a modified racecar driver in the Northeastern United States. He began racing in a small block powered sportsman car owned by his father, in the early 1970s. He won the sportsman championship at Orange County Speedway in 1974.

Horton has won a plethora of modified and sportsman championships at numerous tracks. He was the 1976 Modified champion at Orange County driving his dad's No. 43 and won it again in 2017 driving the Halmar Racing No. 43. That season, he was involved in one of the rare dead heat modified feature wins along with fellow future NASCAR racer Tighe Scott. It was the first race of a twin 50 feature and it was too close to call. Scott and Horton's cars collided after the race. After 1976, he started racing in the No. 3 Statewide dirt modified. He won track championships at Bridgeport Speedway (NJ) in 1975, 1977, 1980, 1982, 1983, 1997, 1998, 2003 and, 2014. Horton won the most races on Bridgeport's 5/8 mile track (before it was reconfigured as a 4/10 mile in 2020). He is a two-time winner of the premier race in dirt modified racing, the Super DIRT Week 200 (1987 & 1994). He won the Eastern States 200 in his later career. He won modified track championships at New Egypt Speedway (NJ) in 2004 and 2006. He is still racing in weekly races at as of 2022.

Horton was inducted into the New York State Stock Car Association Hall of Fame in 2017, into the Northeast Dirt Modified Hall of Fame in 2024, and into the Eastern Motorsports Press Association Hall of Fame in 2025.

=== NASCAR ===
Horton made his first NASCAR start in the Busch Grand National series in 1985. He raced in seven Busch races in his career.

Most of Horton's career Winston Cup starts were at tracks in the Northeastern United States for underfunded teams, but he made two starts (and a relief driver appearance) at Hendrick Motorsports in 1990 when Darrell Waltrip was injured during final practice for the Firecracker 400. Horton's two starts for Hendrick were in the two July restrictor plate races—Daytona and Talladega, and also participated as a relief driver at the second Pocono race. Horton started 41st in the Firecracker (had to move to the rear of the field because of the driver change) at Daytona race, and finished 17th. He finished a career best 13th in the summer race at Talladega, the second of the two races in Hendrick's Tide No. 17 Chevrolet. (Greg Sacks drove the car, except for Sarel van der Merwe at Watkins Glen, until Darlington, when Waltrip was cleared to return.)

Horton was involved in a major crash during the 69th lap of the 1993 DieHard 500. Horton's car was clipped by Stanley Smith's car. Horton's car hit three other cars before it flew over the wall and landed on an access road outside of the track. Smith suffered near-fatal head injuries in the incident, while Horton walked out of the wreck virtually unscathed.

=== ARCA ===
Horton won numerous ARCA races, including the series premiere event, the Daytona ARCA 200, in 1990 and 1992. The 1992 victory was his seventh superspeedway victory, which at the time was the second most in series history. He used a NASCAR Chevrolet Lumina purchased from Darrell Waltrip for the victory. Horton escaped serious injury after a frightening crash at Atlanta in 1995. Horton's No. 52 AC Delco Chevrolet rolled over during a multi-car accident. His car was struck from the bottom while rolling by teammate Ed Dixon. Incredibly, neither driver was seriously injured.

== Personal life ==
On March 1, 2024, Horton acquired Art's Radiator and Welding in Flemington, New Jersey, a well known sponsor in dirt modifieds and chassis and automotive parts supplier, from the Lentini family.

His son Jimmy Horton IV (born March 2, 1987) raced Modifieds for his Grandfather at New Egypt Speedway (NJ) and Bridgeport Speedway (NJ).

== Motorsports career results ==
=== NASCAR ===
(key) (Bold – Pole position awarded by qualifying time. Italics – Pole position earned by points standings or practice time. * – Most laps led.)

==== Winston Cup Series ====
NASCAR Winston Cup Series results
Year	Team	No.	Make	1	2	3	4	5	6	7	8	9	10	11	12	13	14	15	16	17	18	19	20	21	22	23	24	25	26	27	28	29	30	31	32	33	NWCC	Pts	Ref
1987	S & H Racing	80	Ford	DAY	CAR	RCH	ATL	DAR	NWS	BRI	MAR	TAL	CLT	DOV	POC; 21	RSD	MCH	DAY	POC; 33	TAL	GLN	MCH	BRI	DAR	RCH	DOV	MAR	NWS	CLT	CAR	RSD	ATL; DNQ					67th	164	
1988	S & H Racing	80	Ford	DAY; DNQ	RCH	CAR	ATL; DNQ	DAR; 18	BRI	NWS	MAR	TAL; DNQ	CLT; 31	DOV; 34	RSD	POC; 18	MCH; DNQ	DAY; DNQ	POC; 29	TAL	GLN	MCH; DNQ	BRI	DAR; 37	RCH	DOV; 20	MAR	CLT	NWS	CAR; DNQ	PHO	ATL; 32					41st	647	
1989	S & H Racing	80	Pontiac	DAY; DNQ	CAR	ATL; 13	RCH	DAR; 32	BRI	NWS	MAR	TAL; DNQ	CLT	DOV; 31	SON	POC; 37	MCH	DAY	POC; 33	TAL	GLN	MCH	BRI	DAR	RCH	DOV	MAR	CLT	NWS	CAR	PHO	ATL					46th	377	
1990	S & H Racing	80	Ford	DAY; 37	RCH	CAR	ATL	DAR	BRI	NWS	MAR	TAL; DNQ	CLT; 23	DOV; 20	SON	POC; 39	MCH	DAY; DNQ																			36th	756	
1990	Hendrick Motorsports	17	Chevy															DAY; 17	POC	TAL; 13	GLN	MCH	BRI	DAR	RCH												36th	756	
1990	S & H Racing	80	Pontiac																							DOV; 30	MAR	NWS				ATL; 35					36th	756	
1990	Group 44	44	Pontiac																										CLT; 23	CAR	PHO						36th	756	
1991	S & H Racing	80	Chevy	DAY; DNQ	RCH	CAR																															NA	-	
1991	S & H Racing	80	Ford				ATL; DNQ	DAR	BRI	NWS	MAR	TAL	CLT	DOV; DNQ	SON	POC	MCH; DNQ	DAY; DNQ	POC	TAL	GLN	MCH	BRI	DAR	RCH	DOV; DNQ	MAR	NWS	CLT	CAR	PHO	ATL					NA	-	
1992	Active Motorsports	32	Chevy	DAY	CAR	RCH	ATL; 26	DAR	BRI	NWS; DNQ	MAR	TAL	CLT	DOV; 22	SON	POC; 34	MCH; 26	DAY	POC; 34	TAL	GLN	MCH; 38	BRI	DAR	RCH; 31	DOV	MAR; DNQ	NWS	CLT	CAR; 34	PHO	ATL; 24					39th	660	
1993	Active Motorsports	32	Chevy	DAY; 25	CAR	RCH; DNQ	ATL; 27	DAR	BRI	NWS; DNQ	MAR	TAL; 36	SON	CLT; 25		POC; 37	MCH; 41	DAY; 38	NHA	POC; 26	TAL; 39	GLN	MCH; 38	BRI	DAR		DOV; 22	MAR	NWS	CLT	CAR; 34	PHO	ATL; 38				38th	841	
1993	Hover Motorsports	80	Ford												DOV; DNQ											RCH; DNQ											38th	841	
1994	Hover Motorsports	80	Ford	DAY; 19	CAR	RCH	ATL; DNQ	DAR	BRI	NWS	MAR	TAL; DNQ	SON	CLT	DOV	POC	MCH; DNQ	DAY	NHA	POC	TAL	IND	GLN	MCH	BRI	DAR	RCH	DOV	MAR	NWS	CLT	CAR	PHO	ATL			62nd	106	
1995	Junior Johnson & Associates	27	Ford	DAY	CAR	RCH	ATL	DAR	BRI	NWS	MAR	TAL	SON	CLT	DOV	POC; 34	MCH	DAY	NHA	POC	TAL	IND	GLN	MCH	BRI	DAR	RCH	DOV	MAR	NWS	CLT	CAR	PHO				61st	61	
1995	Hendrick Motorsports	58	Chevy																															ATL; QL^{†}			61st	61	
1998	ISM Racing	35	Pontiac	DAY	CAR	LVS	ATL	DAR	BRI	TEX	MAR	TAL	CAL	CLT	DOV	RCH	MCH	POC	SON	NHA	POC; DNQ	IND	GLN	MCH	BRI	NHA	DAR	RCH	DOV	MAR	CLT	TAL	DAY	PHO	CAR	ATL	NA	-	
^{†} - Qualified but replaced by Jeff Purvis

===== Daytona 500 =====
Year	Team	Manufacturer	Start	Finish
1988	S & H Racing	Ford	DNQ	
1989	S & H Racing	Pontiac	DNQ	
1990	S & H Racing	Ford	40	37
1991	S & H Racing	Chevrolet	DNQ	
1993	Active Motorsports	Chevrolet	29	25
1994	Hover Motorsports	Ford	28	19

==== Busch Series ====
NASCAR Busch Series results
Year	Team	No.	Make	1	2	3	4	5	6	7	8	9	10	11	12	13	14	15	16	17	18	19	20	21	22	23	24	25	26	27	28	29	30	31	NBSC	Pts	Ref
1985	S & H Racing	85	Pontiac	DAY; 41	CAR	HCY	BRI	MAR	DAR	SBO	LGY	DOV	CLT	SBO	HCY	ROU	IRP	SBO	LGY	HCY	MLW	BRI	DAR	RCH	NWS	ROU	CLT	HCY	CAR	MAR					94th	40	
1986	S & H Racing	85	Pontiac	DAY; 15	CAR; 30	HCY	MAR	BRI	DAR	SBO	LGY	JFC	DOV	CLT	SBO	HCY	ROU	IRP	SBO	RAL	OXF	SBO	HCY	LGY	ROU	BRI	DAR	RCH	DOV	MAR	ROU	CLT	CAR	MAR	62nd	191	
1987	S & H Racing	85	Buick	DAY; 28	HCY	MAR	DAR; 30	BRI	LGY	SBO	CLT; 37	DOV	IRP	ROU	JFC	OXF	SBO	HCY	RAL	LGY	ROU	BRI	JFC	DAR	RCH	DOV	MAR	CLT	CAR	MAR					47th	204	
1988	S & H Racing	85	Buick	DAY; DNQ	HCY	CAR	MAR	DAR	BRI	LNG	NZH	SBO	NSV	CLT	DOV	ROU	LAN	LVL	MYB	OXF	SBO	HCY	LNG	IRP	ROU	BRI	DAR	RCH	DOV	MAR	CLT	CAR	MAR		NA	-	
1989	Ken Schrader Racing	52	Chevy	DAY	CAR	MAR	HCY	DAR	BRI	NZH	SBO	LAN	NSV	CLT	DOV	ROU	LVL	VOL	MYB	SBO	HCY	DUB	IRP	ROU	BRI	DAR; 16	RCH	DOV	MAR	CLT	CAR	MAR			99th	-	

=== ARCA Hooters SuperCar Series ===
(key) (Bold – Pole position awarded by qualifying time. Italics – Pole position earned by points standings or practice time. * – Most laps led.)

ARCA Hooters SuperCar Series results
Year	Team	No.	Make	1	2	3	4	5	6	7	8	9	10	11	12	13	14	15	16	17	18	19	20	21	AHSSC	Pts	Ref
1988	S & H Racing	80	Ford	DAY; 25	ATL	TAL	FRS	PCS	ROC	POC; 23	WIN	KIL	ACS	SLM	POC; 4	TAL	DEL	FRS	ISF	DSF	SLM	ATL; 7			42nd	-	
1989	S & H Racing	80	Pontiac	DAY; 5	ATL; 18	KIL	TAL; 31	FRS	POC; 24	KIL	HAG	POC; 34	TAL; DNQ	DEL	FRS	ISF	TOL	DSF	SLM	ATL; 8					28th	-	
1990	S & H Racing	80	Pontiac	DAY; 1	**ATL**; 1*	KIL	TAL; 1*	FRS	POC; 1	KIL	TOL	HAG	POC; 1	TAL; 36	MCH; 31	ISF	TOL	DSF	WIN	DEL	ATL; 33				21st	-	
1991	S & H Racing	80	Chevy	DAY; 4	ATL; 34	KIL																			61st	-	
1991	S & H Racing	80	Pontiac				TAL; 1*	TOL	FRS	POC	MCH	KIL	FRS	DEL	POC	TAL	HPT	MCH	ISF	TOL	DSF	TWS	ATL		61st	-	
1992	Active Motorsports	32	Chevy	DAY; 1	FIF	TWS	TAL; 38	TOL	KIL	POC	MCH	FRS	KIL	NSH	DEL	POC	HPT	FRS	ISF	TOL	DSF	TWS	SLM	ATL	94th	-	
1993	Active Motorsports	32	Chevy	DAY; 37	FIF	TWS	TAL	KIL	CMS	FRS	TOL	POC; 2	**MCH**; 27	FRS	POC; 19	KIL	ISF	DSF	TOL	SLM	WIN	ATL			44th	-	
1994	Ken Schrader Racing	52	Chevy	DAY	TAL; 4						MCH; 27	DMS	POC	POC	KIL	FRS	INF	I70	ISF	DSF	TOL	SLM	WIN	ATL; 2	53rd	1045	
1994	Ken Schrader Racing	52	Olds			FIF; 5	LVL	KIL	TOL	FRS															53rd	1045	
1995	Ken Schrader Racing	52	Chevy	DAY	**ATL**; 1	TAL; 39	FIF	KIL	FRS	**MCH**; 8	I80	MCS	FRS	POC	POC	KIL	FRS	SBS	LVL	ISF	DSF	SLM	WIN	ATL; 33	42nd	845	
