= 1983 World 600 =

Race details
- Race 12 of 30 in the 1983 NASCAR Winston Cup Series season
- 1983 World 600 program cover, featuring Stroker Ace and Pembrook Fenny from the film Stroker Ace, which would release later that year
- Date: May 29, 1983
- Official name: World 600
- Location: Charlotte Motor Speedway, Concord, North Carolina
- Course: Permanent racing facility
- Course length: 1.500 miles (2.414 km)
- Distance: 400 laps, 600 mi (965 km)
- Weather: Hot, humid, and partly cloudy with a high around 80.1 °F (26.7 °C); wind out of the ESE at 7.48 miles per hour (12.04 km/h)
- Average speed: 140.707 miles per hour (226.446 km/h)
- Attendance: 137,000

Pole position
Driver	Buddy Baker	Wood Brothers Racing

Most laps led
Driver	Bobby Allison	DiGard Motorsports
- Laps: 188

Winner
No. 75	Neil Bonnett	RahMoc Enterprises

Television in the United States
- Network: Mizlou
- Announcers: Ken Squier; Phil Parsons

The 1983 World 600, the 24th running of the event, was a NASCAR Winston Cup Series racing event that took place on May 29, 1983, at the Charlotte Motor Speedway (Concord, North Carolina, US).

== Background ==
The layout of Charlotte Motor Speedway, the venue where the race was held.

The race was held at Charlotte Motor Speedway, a 1.5-mile (2.4 km) quad-oval track located thirteen miles from Charlotte, North Carolina in Concord. The track sanctioned NASCAR Winston Cup Series events biannually during the 1983 season, with the other race being the Miller High Life 500. The track opened for the 1960 World 600, and was built by Bruton Smith and Curtis Turner.

== Summary ==
This event took four hours, fifteen minutes, and fifty-one seconds to complete. Five cautions were waved for twenty-eight laps. Neil Bonnett defeated Richard Petty by a margin of 0.8 seconds in front of 137,000 people. Notable speeds for this race were: 140.707 miles per hour (226.446 km/h) as the average speed and 162.841 miles per hour (262.067 km/h) as the pole position speed. Bonnett had previously won the 1982 running of the same event and would repeat his success. However, he would never win another World 600 race after this one. Canadian driver Trevor Boys started in 33rd and finished in 20th during this race in his #48 Chevrolet. Total winnings for this race were $407,190 ($1,316,259 when adjusted for inflation).

Jimmy Means was in the top 10 in points after this race. He was ahead in the point standings of NASCAR legends such as Ricky Rudd, Dave Marcis, Tim Richmond, Geoff Bodine, Kyle Petty, and Dale Earnhardt. Bobby Allison and Bill Elliott had a great race going for the lead until they were both swept up in the Sterlin Marlin, Slick Johnson spin out. There was some heavy rainfall after the race which did not affect the race.

Margaret Claud Padgett was the designated Miss Winston for this race in addition to every NASCAR Winston Cup Series racing event held from 1981 to 1985.

== Qualifying ==
Pos.	#	Driver	Make	Team/Owner	Time	Avg. Speed (mph)
1	21	Buddy Baker	Ford	Wood Brothers Racing		162.841
2	9	Bill Elliott	Ford	Melling Racing		
3	15	Dale Earnhardt	Ford	Bud Moore Engineering		
4	16	David Pearson	Chevrolet	Bobby Hawkins Racing		
5	75	Neil Bonnett	Chevrolet	RahMoc Enterprises		
6	98	Joe Ruttman	Chevrolet	Benfield Racing		
7	55	Benny Parsons	Buick	Johnny Hayes Racing		
8	33	Harry Gant	Buick	Mach 1 Racing		
9	3	Ricky Rudd	Chevrolet	Richard Childress Racing		
10	90	Dick Brooks	Ford	Donlavey Racing		
11	27	Tim Richmond	Pontiac	Blue Max Racing		
12	28	Cale Yarborough	Chevrolet	Ranier-Lundy Racing		
13	22	Bobby Allison	Buick	DiGard Motorsports		
14	11	Darrell Waltrip	Chevrolet	Junior Johnson & Associates		
15	44	Terry Labonte	Chevrolet	Hagan Racing		
16	88	Geoffrey Bodine	Pontiac	Cliff Stewart Racing		
17	43	Richard Petty	Pontiac	Petty Enterprises		
18	97	Ken Ragan	Buick	Branch-Ragan Racing		
19	67	Buddy Arrington	Chrysler	Arrington Racing		
20	01	Mark Martin	Chevrolet	Zervakis Racing		
21	7	Kyle Petty	Pontiac	Petty Enterprises		
22	2	Morgan Shepherd	Buick	Jim Stacy Racing		
23	77	Dean Combs	Buick	Irv Sanderson		
24	6	D.K. Ulrich	Chevrolet	Ulrich Racing		
25	64	Tommy Gale	Ford	Langley Racing		
26	18	Slick Johnson	Buick	Satterfield Racing		
27	47	Ron Bouchard	Buick	Race Hill Farm Team		
28	80	Bob Senneker	Pontiac	Terry Marra		
29	71	Dave Marcis	Chevrolet	Marcis Auto Racing		
30	17	Sterling Marlin	Chevrolet	Hamby Racing		
31	99	Philip Duffie	Buick	Philip Duffie		
32	1	Lake Speed	Chevrolet	Ellington Racing		
33	48	Trevor Boys	Chevrolet	James Hylton Motorsports		
34	24	Jim Vandiver	Chrysler	Gordon Racing		
35	32	Tommy Ellis	Buick	Terry Motorsports		
36	52	Jimmy Means	Buick	Jimmy Means Racing		
37	36	H.B. Bailey	Pontiac	Bailey Racing		
38	74	Bobby Wawak	Chevrolet	Wawak Racing		
39	70	J.D. McDuffie	Pontiac	McDuffie Racing		
40	8	Bobby Hillin, Jr.	Buick	Hillin Racing		
41	02	Rick Newsom	Chevrolet	Reeder Racing		151.647

Drivers that failed to qualify were: Ronnie Thomas (#41), Lennie Pond, Jody Ridley (#84) and Rick Baldwin (#04).

== Race results ==
Fin	St	#	Driver	Make	Team/Owner	Sponsor	Laps	Led	Status	Pts	Winnings
1	5	75	Neil Bonnett	Chevrolet	RahMoc Enterprises	Hodgdon	400	69	running	180	
2	17	43	Richard Petty	Pontiac	Petty Enterprises	STP	400	4	running	175	
3	13	22	Bobby Allison	Buick	DiGard Motorsports	Miller High Life	400	188	running	175	
4	14	11	Darrell Waltrip	Chevrolet	Junior Johnson & Associates	Pepsi Challenger	399	0	running	160	
5	3	15	Dale Earnhardt	Ford	Bud Moore Engineering	Wrangler	399	55	running	160	
6	32	1	Lake Speed	Chevrolet	Ellington Racing	UNO	398	0	running	150	
7	1	21	Buddy Baker	Ford	Wood Brothers Racing	Valvoline	398	0	running	146	
8	21	7	Kyle Petty	Pontiac	Petty Enterprises	7-Eleven	395	1	running	147	
9	22	2	Morgan Shepherd	Buick	Jim Stacy Racing	ACM Equipment Sales	392	0	running	138	
10	29	71	Dave Marcis	Chevrolet	Marcis Auto Racing	Transmissions Unlimited	390	0	running	134	
11	40	8	Bobby Hillin, Jr.	Buick	Hillin Racing	Danelle Jeans	388	0	running	130	
12	19	67	Buddy Arrington	Chrysler	Arrington Racing	Motorsports Designs	388	0	running	127	
13	23	77	Dean Combs	Buick	Irv Sanderson	Best Products	388	0	running	124	
14	6	98	Joe Ruttman	Chevrolet	Benfield Racing	Levi Garrett	388	0	running	121	
15	35	32	Tommy Ellis	Buick	Terry Motorsports	Big Daddy's	386	0	running	118	
16	2	9	Bill Elliott	Ford	Melling Racing	Melling Oil Pumps	384	47	running	120	
17	18	97	Ken Ragan	Buick	Branch-Ragan Racing	Clinomint	381	0	running	112	
18	38	74	Bobby Wawak	Chevrolet	Wawak Racing	Superior Piping	378	0	running	109	
19	30	17	Sterling Marlin	Chevrolet	Hamby Racing	Hesco Exhaust	377	0	running	106	
20	33	48	Trevor Boys	Chevrolet	James Hylton Motorsports	Hylton-McCaig	376	0	running	103	
21	34	24	Jim Vandiver	Chrysler	Gordon Racing	Western Carolina Forklift	369	0	running	100	
22	37	36	H.B. Bailey	Pontiac	Bailey Racing	Monroe RV	369	0	running	97	
23	24	6	D.K. Ulrich	Chevrolet	Ulrich Racing	Ulrich Racing	366	0	running	94	
24	26	18	Slick Johnson	Buick	Satterfield Racing	Leon Satterfield	359	0	running	91	
25	8	33	Harry Gant	Buick	Mach 1 Racing	Skoal Bandit	352	2	running	93	
26	39	70	J.D. McDuffie	Pontiac	McDuffie Racing	McDuffie Racing	344	0	running	85	
27	28	80	Bob Senneker	Pontiac	Terry Marra	Elk Vans	326	0	battery	82	
28	12	28	Cale Yarborough	Chevrolet	Ranier-Lundy Racing	Hardee's	321	31	engine	84	
29	20	01	Mark Martin	Chevrolet	Zervakis Racing	Activision	279	0	crash	76	
30	31	99	Philip Duffie	Buick	Philip Duffie	U.S. Duffie Sand & Gravel	277	0	overheating	73	
31	41	02	Rick Newsom	Chevrolet	Reeder Racing	Louise Smith Special	261	0	running	70	
32	9	3	Ricky Rudd	Chevrolet	Richard Childress Racing	Piedmont Airlines	245	0	running	67	
33	15	44	Terry Labonte	Chevrolet	Hagan Racing	Budweiser	231	3	oil pump	69	
34	7	55	Benny Parsons	Buick	Johnny Hayes Racing	Skoal	201	0	rear end	61	
35	25	64	Tommy Gale	Ford	Langley Racing	Sunny King Ford & Honda	94	0	engine	58	
36	16	88	Geoffrey Bodine	Pontiac	Cliff Stewart Racing	Gatorade	67	0	crash	55	
37	10	90	Dick Brooks	Ford	Donlavey Racing	Chameleon Sunglasses	67	0	crash	52	
38	36	52	Jimmy Means	Buick	Jimmy Means Racing	Broadway Motors	65	0	crash	49	
39	4	16	David Pearson	Chevrolet	Bobby Hawkins Racing	Chattanooga Chew	65	0	crash	46	
40	11	27	Tim Richmond	Pontiac	Blue Max Racing	Old Milwaukee	17	0	engine	43	
41	27	47	Ron Bouchard	Buick	Race Hill Farm Team	Race Hill Farm	14	0	oil seal	40	

== Standings after the race ==
Pos	Driver	Points	Differential
1	Bobby Allison	1881	0
2	Darrell Waltrip	1696	-185
3	Neil Bonnett	1681	-200
4	Bill Elliott	1675	-206
5	Harry Gant	1665	-216
6	Darrell Waltrip	1658	-223
7	Joe Ruttman	1647	-234
8	Terry Labonte	1421	-460
9	Dick Brooks	1416	-465
10	Jimmy Means	1381	-500

Preceded by 1983 Valleydale 500	NASCAR Winston Cup Series races 1983	Succeeded by 1983 Budweiser 400

Preceded by 1982	World 600 races 1983	Succeeded by 1984
