= Philip Duffie =

American racing driver

- Born: December 31, 1953 (age 72); Augusta, Georgia, U.S.

NASCAR Cup Series career
- 12 races run over 8 years
- Best finish: 40th (1982)
- First race: 1982 Winston 500 (Talladega)
- Last race: 1990 Heinz Southern 500 (Darlington)
Wins	Top tens	Poles
0	0	0

ARCA Menards Series career
- 3 races run over 2 years
- First race: 1985 Daytona ARCA 200 (Daytona)
- Last race: 1986 96 Rock 300 (Atlanta)
Wins	Top tens	Poles
0	1	0
- Statistics up to date as of November 1, 2024.

Philip Duffie (born December 31, 1953) is an American former professional stock car racing driver who has previously competed in the NASCAR Winston Cup Series, where he ran from 1982 to 1991 and achieved a best finish of sixteenth at Atlanta Motor Speedway in 1982.

Duffie has also competed in the ARCA Permatex SuperCar Series, the NASCAR Southeast Series, the American Challenge Series, and the Southern All Star Dirt Racing Series.

== Motorsports career results ==
=== NASCAR ===
(key) (Bold - Pole position awarded by qualifying time. Italics - Pole position earned by points standings or practice time. * – Most laps led.)

==== Winston Cup Series ====
NASCAR Winston Cup Series results
Year	Team	No.	Make	1	2	3	4	5	6	7	8	9	10	11	12	13	14	15	16	17	18	19	20	21	22	23	24	25	26	27	28	29	30	NWCC	Pts	Ref
1982	Duffie Racing	99	Buick	DAY	RCH	BRI	ATL	CAR	DAR	NWS	MAR	TAL; 17	NSV	DOV	CLT	POC	RSD	MCH	DAY; 18	NSV	POC	TAL; 23	MCH	BRI	DAR; 17	RCH	DOV	NWS	CLT; DNQ	MAR	CAR	ATL; 16	RSD	40th	542	
1983	Duffie Racing	99	Buick	DAY; DNQ	RCH	CAR	ATL	DAR	NWS	MAR	TAL; 38	NSV	DOV	BRI	CLT; 30	RSD	POC	MCH	DAY	NSV	POC	TAL	MCH	BRI	DAR; 34	RCH	DOV	MAR	NWS	CLT; 27	CAR	ATL	RSD	50th	265	
1984	Duffie Racing	99	Buick	DAY; DNQ	RCH	CAR	ATL	BRI	NWS	DAR	MAR	TAL	NSV	DOV	CLT	RSD	POC	MCH	DAY	NSV	POC	TAL	MCH	BRI	DAR	RCH	DOV	MAR	CLT	NWS	CAR	ATL	RSD	N/A	0	
1987	Duffie Racing	99	Buick	DAY	CAR	RCH	ATL	DAR	NWS	BRI	MAR	TAL	CLT	DOV	POC	RSD	MCH	DAY	POC	TAL	GLN	MCH	BRI	DAR	RCH	DOV	MAR	NWS	CLT; DNQ	CAR	RSD	ATL; DNQ		N/A	0	
1988	Duffie Racing	32	Buick	DAY	RCH	CAR	ATL	DAR	BRI	NWS	MAR	TAL	CLT	DOV	RSD	POC	MCH	DAY; DNQ	POC	TAL; DNQ	GLN	MCH	BRI	DAR; 29	RCH	DOV	MAR	CLT; DNQ	NWS	CAR; DNQ	PHO	ATL		77th	76	
1989	Duffie Racing	32	Buick	DAY; DNQ	CAR	ATL	RCH	DAR	BRI	NWS	MAR	TAL; DNQ	CLT	DOV	SON	POC	MCH	DAY	POC	TAL	GLN	MCH	BRI	DAR	RCH	DOV	MAR	CLT	NWS	CAR	PHO	ATL		N/A	0	
1990	Duffie Racing	32	Buick	DAY; DNQ	RCH	CAR	ATL	DAR	BRI	NWS	MAR	TAL	CLT	DOV	SON	POC	MCH	DAY; 21	POC	TAL	GLN	MCH	BRI	DAR; 37	RCH	DOV	MAR	NWS	CLT	CAR	PHO	ATL		68th	152	
1991	Fulcher Racing	45	Olds	DAY; DNQ	RCH	CAR	ATL	DAR	BRI	NWS	MAR	TAL	CLT	DOV	SON	POC	MCH	DAY	POC	TAL	GLN	MCH	BRI	DAR	RCH	DOV	MAR	NWS	CLT	CAR	PHO	ATL		N/A	0	

===== Daytona 500 =====
Year	Team	Manufacturer	Start	Finish
1983	Duffie Racing	Buick	DNQ	
1984	Duffie Racing	Buick	DNQ	
1989	Duffie Racing	Buick	DNQ	
1990	Duffie Racing	Buick	DNQ	
1991	Fulcher Racing	Oldsmobile	DNQ	

=== ARCA Permatex SuperCar Series ===
(key) (Bold – Pole position awarded by qualifying time. Italics – Pole position earned by points standings or practice time. * – Most laps led.)

ARCA Permatex SuperCar Series results
Year	Team	No.	Make	1	2	3	4	5	6	7	8	9	10	11	12	13	14	15	16	APSSC	Pts	Ref
1985	Philip Duffie	94	Buick	ATL	DAY; 13	ATL; 5	TAL	ATL	SSP	IRP	CSP	FRS	IRP	OEF	ISF	DSF	TOL			N/A	0	
1986	Philip Duffie	91	Buick	ATL	DAY	ATL	TAL	SIR	SSP	FRS	KIL	CSP	TAL	BLN	ISF	DSF	TOL	MCS	ATL; 37	N/A	0	
