= 1987 Winston Western 500 =

28th race of the 1987 NASCAR Winston Cup Series

Race details
- Race 28 of 29 in the 1987 NASCAR Winston Cup Series
- The 1987 Winston Western 500 program cover, featuring Tim Richmond and Dale Earnhardt.
- Date: November 8, 1987
- Official name: 27th Annual Winston Western 500
- Location: Riverside International Raceway, Riverside, California
- Course: Permanent racing facility
- Course length: 2.62 miles (4.216 km)
- Distance: 119 laps, 311.78 mi (501.761 km)
- Average speed: 98.035 miles per hour (157.772 km/h)
- Attendance: 64,500

Pole position
Driver	Geoff Bodine	Hendrick Motorsports
- Time: 1:19.977

Most laps led
Driver	Geoff Bodine	Hendrick Motorsports
- Laps: 92

Winner
No. 27	Rusty Wallace	Blue Max Racing

Television in the United States
- Network: TBS
- Announcers: Ken Squier, Buddy Baker, Johnny Hayes

Radio in the United States
- Radio: Motor Racing Network

The 1987 Winston Western 500 was the 28th and penultimate stock car race of the 1987 NASCAR Winston Cup Series season, the eighth and the final race of the 1987 NASCAR Winston West Series, and the 27th iteration of the event. The race was held on Sunday, November 8, 1987, before an audience of 64,500 in Riverside, California, at the short layout of Riverside International Raceway, a 2.62 miles (4.22 km) permanent road course layout at the track. The race took the scheduled 119 laps to complete.

Taking advantage of misfortune caused by an aggressive battle for the lead in the closing laps between Dale Earnhardt and Geoff Bodine, Blue Max Racing's Rusty Wallace was able to pull ahead when Bodine blew a tire and Earnhardt blew his engine. Wallace was able to score his fourth career NASCAR Winston Cup Series victory and his second and final victory of the season. To fill out the top three, Hendrick Motorsports' Benny Parsons and Wood Brothers Racing's Kyle Petty finished second and third, respectively.

== Background ==
The layout of Riverside International Raceway, the venue where the race was held.

Riverside International Raceway (sometimes known as Riverside, RIR, or Riverside Raceway) was a motorsports race track and road course established in the Edgemont area of Riverside County, California, just east of the city limits of Riverside and 50 mi (80 km) east of Los Angeles, in 1957. In 1984, the raceway became part of the newly incorporated city of Moreno Valley. Riverside was noted for its hot, dusty environment and for being somewhat of a complicated and dangerous track for drivers. It was also considered one of the finest tracks in the United States.

=== Entry list ===
- (R) denotes rookie driver.

#	Driver	Team	Make	Sponsor
2	St. James Davis	St. James Racing	Buick	St. James Racing
3	Dale Earnhardt	Richard Childress Racing	Chevrolet	Wrangler
4	Rick Wilson	Morgan–McClure Motorsports	Oldsmobile	Kodak
04	Hershel McGriff	Gary Smith Racing	Pontiac	Wershow–Ash–Lewis Auctioneers
5	Geoff Bodine	Hendrick Motorsports	Chevrolet	Levi Garrett
6	Ernie Irvan	U.S. Racing	Chevrolet	Dale Earnhardt Chevrolet
7	Alan Kulwicki	AK Racing	Ford	Zerex
8	Bobby Hillin Jr.	Stavola Brothers Racing	Buick	Miller American
9	Bill Elliott	Melling Racing	Ford	Coors
11	Terry Labonte	Junior Johnson & Associates	Chevrolet	Budweiser
12	Trevor Boys	Hamby Racing	Chevrolet	Hamby Racing
14	Harry Goularte	Goularte Racing	Chevrolet	Goularte Racing
15	Ricky Rudd	Bud Moore Engineering	Ford	Motorcraft Quality Parts
17	Darrell Waltrip	Hendrick Motorsports	Chevrolet	Tide
18	Dale Jarrett (R)	Freedlander Motorsports	Chevrolet	Coats & Clark
21	Kyle Petty	Wood Brothers Racing	Ford	Citgo
22	Bobby Allison	Stavola Brothers Racing	Buick	Miller American
25	Rick Hendrick	Hendrick Motorsports	Chevrolet	Folgers
26	Morgan Shepherd	King Racing	Buick	Quaker State
27	Rusty Wallace	Blue Max Racing	Pontiac	Kodiak
28	Davey Allison (R)	Ranier-Lundy Racing	Ford	Texaco. Havoline
29	George Follmer	Midgley Racing	Chevrolet	Budget Rent a Car
30	Michael Waltrip	Bahari Racing	Chevrolet	Bahari Racing
32	Ruben Garcia	Stoke Racing	Chevrolet	Suncrest Motorhomes
33	Harry Gant	Mach 1 Racing	Chevrolet	Skoal Bandit
35	Benny Parsons	Hendrick Motorsports	Chevrolet	Folgers Decaf
41	Jack Sellers	Vincent Racing	Chevrolet	Coca-Cola
43	Richard Petty	Petty Enterprises	Pontiac	STP
44	Sterling Marlin	Hagan Racing	Oldsmobile	Piedmont Airlines
52	Jimmy Means	Jimmy Means Racing	Pontiac	Eureka
55	Phil Parsons	Jackson Bros. Motorsports	Oldsmobile	Skoal Classic
63	Jocko Maggiacomo	Linro Motorsports	Chevrolet	Linro Motorsports
64	Rick McCray	Langley Racing	Chevrolet	Fluro-Cote
66	John Krebs	Krebs Racing	Oldsmobile	Skoal Classic
67	Buddy Arrington	Arrington Racing	Ford	Pannill Sweatshirts
71	Dave Marcis	Marcis Auto Racing	Chevrolet	Lifebuoy
73	Bill Schmitt	Schmitt Racing	Chevrolet	Tom Bell Chevrolet
75	Joe Ruttman	RahMoc Enterprises	Pontiac	Valvoline
76	Tommy Kendall	Spears Motorsports	Buick	Spears Manufacturing
78	Jim Robinson	Lois Williams Racing	Oldsmobile	Lois Williams Racing
79	Roy Smith	Razore Racing	Ford	Western Peterbilt
81	Glen Steurer	Steurer Racing	Chevrolet	Steurer Racing
88	Irv Hoerr	Baker–Schiff Racing	Oldsmobile	Bull Frog Knits
90	Ken Schrader	Donlavey Racing	Ford	Red Baron Frozen Pizza
93	Derrike Cope (R)	Stoke Racing	Chevrolet	Wholesale Truck Parts
95	Chad Little	George Jefferson Racing	Ford	Coors
98	Brad Noffsinger	Curb Racing	Pontiac	Curb Records

== Qualifying ==
Qualifying was split into two rounds. The first round was held on Friday, November 6, at 4:30 PM EST. Each driver had one lap to set a time. During the first round, the top 25 drivers in the round were guaranteed a starting spot in the race. If a driver was not able to guarantee a spot in the first round, they had the option to scrub their time from the first round and try and run a faster lap time in a second round qualifying run, held on Saturday, November 7, at 2:00 PM EST. As with the first round, each driver had one lap to set a time. For this specific race, positions 26-40 were decided on time, and depending on who needed it, a select amount of positions were given to cars who had not otherwise qualified but were high enough in owner's points; up to two provisionals were given.

Geoff Bodine, driving for Hendrick Motorsports, managed to win the pole, setting a time of 1:19.977 and an average speed of 117.934 miles per hour (189.796 km/h) in the first round.

Five drivers failed to qualify.

=== Full qualifying results ===
Pos.	#	Driver	Team	Make	Time	Speed
1	5	Geoff Bodine	Hendrick Motorsports	Chevrolet	1:19.977	117.934
2	15	Ricky Rudd	Bud Moore Engineering	Ford	1:20.139	117.696
3	27	Rusty Wallace	Blue Max Racing	Pontiac	1:20.296	117.465
4	11	Terry Labonte	Junior Johnson & Associates	Chevrolet	1:20.466	117.217
5	21	Kyle Petty	Wood Brothers Racing	Ford	1:20.611	117.006
6	9	Bill Elliott	Melling Racing	Ford	1:20.719	116.850
7	7	Alan Kulwicki	AK Racing	Ford	1:21.009	116.432
8	3	Dale Earnhardt	Richard Childress Racing	Chevrolet	1:21.383	115.896
9	30	Michael Waltrip	Bahari Racing	Chevrolet	1:21.407	115.862
10	35	Benny Parsons	Hendrick Motorsports	Chevrolet	1:21.577	115.621
11	22	Bobby Allison	Stavola Brothers Racing	Buick	1:21.634	115.540
12	93	Derrike Cope (R)	Stoke Racing	Chevrolet	1:21.656	115.509
13	78	Jim Robinson	Lois Williams Racing	Oldsmobile	1:21.708	115.435
14	33	Harry Gant	Mach 1 Racing	Chevrolet	1:21.711	115.431
15	8	Bobby Hillin Jr.	Stavola Brothers Racing	Buick	1:21.765	115.355
16	43	Richard Petty	Petty Enterprises	Pontiac	1:21.778	115.337
17	44	Sterling Marlin	Hagan Racing	Oldsmobile	1:21.799	115.307
18	88	Irv Hoerr	Baker–Schiff Racing	Oldsmobile	1:21.825	115.270
19	4	Rick Wilson	Morgan–McClure Motorsports	Oldsmobile	1:22.185	114.766
20	79	Roy Smith	Razore Racing	Ford	1:22.255	114.668
21	25	Rick Hendrick	Hendrick Motorsports	Chevrolet	1:22.258	114.664
22	71	Dave Marcis	Marcis Auto Racing	Chevrolet	1:22.513	114.309
23	75	Joe Ruttman	RahMoc Enterprises	Pontiac	1:22.693	114.060
24	29	George Follmer	Midgley Racing	Chevrolet	1:22.908	113.765
25	28	Davey Allison (R)	Ranier-Lundy Racing	Ford	1:22.992	113.650
Failed to lock in Round 1
26	26	Morgan Shepherd	King Racing	Buick	1:20.641	116.963
27	17	Darrell Waltrip	Hendrick Motorsports	Chevrolet	1:21.250	116.086
28	81	Glen Steurer	Steurer Racing	Chevrolet	1:22.176	114.778
29	64	Rick McCray	Langley Racing	Chevrolet	1:22.580	114.217
30	63	Jocko Maggiacomo	Linro Motorsports	Chevrolet	1:22.812	113.897
31	76	Tommy Kendall	Spears Motorsports	Buick	1:22.883	113.799
32	04	Hershel McGriff	Smith Racing	Pontiac	1:23.046	113.576
33	14	Harry Goularte	Goularte Racing	Chevrolet	1:23.063	113.552
34	6	Ernie Irvan	U.S. Racing	Chevrolet	1:23.107	113.492
35	73	Bill Schmitt	Schmitt Racing	Chevrolet	1:23.128	113.464
36	95	Chad Little	George Jefferson Racing	Ford	1:23.152	113.431
37	55	Phil Parsons	Jackson Bros. Motorsports	Oldsmobile	1:23.269	113.271
38	90	Ken Schrader	Donlavey Racing	Ford	1:23.299	113.231
39	18	Dale Jarrett (R)	Freedlander Motorsports	Chevrolet	1:23.304	113.224
40	52	Jimmy Means	Jimmy Means Racing	Pontiac	1:23.323	113.198
Winston Cup provisional
41	67	Buddy Arrington	Arrington Racing	Ford	1:23.845	112.493
Winston West provisional
42	32	Ruben Garcia	Stoke Racing	Chevrolet	1:23.391	113.106
Failed to qualify
43	12	Trevor Boys	Hamby Racing	Chevrolet	1:23.352	113.159
44	66	John Krebs	Krebs Racing	Oldsmobile	1:23.879	112.448
45	98	Brad Noffsinger	Curb Racing	Pontiac	1:26.247	109.360
46	2	St. James Davis	St. James Racing	Buick	1:29.126	105.828
47	41	Jack Sellers	Vincent Racing	Chevrolet	1:31.808	102.736
Official first round qualifying results
Official starting lineup

== Race results ==
Fin	St	#	Driver	Team	Make	Laps	Led	Status	Pts	Winnings
1	3	27	Rusty Wallace	Blue Max Racing	Pontiac	119	11	running	180	$47,725
2	10	35	Benny Parsons	Hendrick Motorsports	Chevrolet	119	0	running	170	$28,700
3	5	21	Kyle Petty	Wood Brothers Racing	Ford	119	0	running	165	$21,125
4	16	43	Richard Petty	Petty Enterprises	Pontiac	119	0	running	160	$13,780
5	11	22	Bobby Allison	Stavola Brothers Racing	Buick	119	0	running	155	$14,575
6	27	17	Darrell Waltrip	Hendrick Motorsports	Chevrolet	119	1	running	155	$6,745
7	23	75	Joe Ruttman	RahMoc Enterprises	Pontiac	119	0	running	0	$8,025
8	4	11	Terry Labonte	Junior Johnson & Associates	Chevrolet	119	1	running	147	$12,400
9	22	71	Dave Marcis	Marcis Auto Racing	Chevrolet	119	0	running	138	$9,415
10	1	5	Geoff Bodine	Hendrick Motorsports	Chevrolet	119	92	running	144	$18,275
11	7	7	Alan Kulwicki	AK Racing	Ford	119	0	running	130	$8,655
12	13	78	Jim Robinson	Lois Williams Racing	Oldsmobile	118	0	running	127	$4,785
13	37	55	Phil Parsons	Jackson Bros. Motorsports	Oldsmobile	118	0	running	124	$2,350
14	25	28	Davey Allison (R)	Ranier-Lundy Racing	Ford	118	0	running	121	$3,000
15	36	95	Chad Little	George Jefferson Racing	Ford	117	0	running	118	$4,775
16	24	29	George Follmer	Midgley Racing	Chevrolet	117	8	running	120	$2,005
17	39	18	Dale Jarrett (R)	Freedlander Motorsports	Chevrolet	116	0	running	112	$5,370
18	19	4	Rick Wilson	Morgan–McClure Motorsports	Oldsmobile	116	0	running	109	$1,905
19	34	6	Ernie Irvan	U.S. Racing	Chevrolet	116	0	running	106	$5,060
20	12	93	Derrike Cope (R)	Stoke Racing	Chevrolet	114	0	running	103	$2,355
21	41	67	Buddy Arrington	Arrington Racing	Ford	114	0	running	100	$4,800
22	18	88	Irv Hoerr	Baker–Schiff Racing	Oldsmobile	114	0	running	0	$1,705
23	6	9	Bill Elliott	Melling Racing	Ford	114	0	running	94	$10,255
24	17	44	Sterling Marlin	Hagan Racing	Oldsmobile	112	0	running	91	$4,380
25	26	26	Morgan Shepherd	King Racing	Buick	110	0	running	88	$4,920
26	9	30	Michael Waltrip	Bahari Racing	Chevrolet	109	0	running	85	$4,180
27	40	52	Jimmy Means	Jimmy Means Racing	Pontiac	108	0	running	82	$4,110
28	14	33	Harry Gant	Mach 1 Racing	Chevrolet	106	0	engine	79	$3,325
29	38	90	Ken Schrader	Donlavey Racing	Ford	102	0	clutch	76	$3,275
30	8	3	Dale Earnhardt	Richard Childress Racing	Chevrolet	93	1	engine	78	$11,975
31	2	15	Ricky Rudd	Bud Moore Engineering	Ford	90	5	engine	75	$9,600
32	33	14	Harry Goularte	Goularte Racing	Chevrolet	79	0	suspension	67	$1,675
33	21	25	Rick Hendrick	Hendrick Motorsports	Chevrolet	75	0	transmission	0	$1,150
34	15	8	Bobby Hillin Jr.	Stavola Brothers Racing	Buick	63	0	engine	61	$8,125
35	29	64	Rick McCray	Langley Racing	Chevrolet	63	0	suspension	58	$3,100
36	35	73	Bill Schmitt	Schmitt Racing	Chevrolet	36	0	clutch	55	$1,500
37	30	63	Jocko Maggiacomo	Linro Motorsports	Chevrolet	26	0	transmission	52	$975
38	31	76	Tommy Kendall	Spears Motorsports	Buick	26	0	oil pressure	0	$950
39	42	32	Ruben Garcia	Stoke Racing	Chevrolet	24	0	engine	46	$1,425
40	20	79	Roy Smith	Razore Racing	Ford	23	0	overheating	43	$1,425
41	28	81	Glen Steurer	Steurer Racing	Chevrolet	19	0	suspension	0	$925
42	32	04	Hershel McGriff	Smith Racing	Pontiac	7	0	engine	37	$2,525
Failed to qualify
43		12	Trevor Boys	Hamby Racing	Chevrolet					
44		66	John Krebs	Krebs Racing	Oldsmobile					
45		98	Brad Noffsinger	Curb Racing	Pontiac					
46		2	St. James Davis	St. James Racing	Buick					
47		41	Jack Sellers	Vincent Racing	Chevrolet					
Official race results

== Standings after the race ==
Drivers' Championship standings

	Pos	Driver	Points
	1	Dale Earnhardt	4,521
	2	Bill Elliott	4,022 (-499)
	3	Terry Labonte	3,923 (-598)
	4	Darrell Waltrip	3,802 (–719)
	5	Rusty Wallace	3,691 (–830)
1	6	Richard Petty	3,635 (–886)
1	7	Kyle Petty	3,613 (–908)
2	8	Ricky Rudd	3,572 (–949)
2	9	Bobby Allison	3,365 (–1,156)
1	10	Neil Bonnett	3,352 (–1,169)
Official driver's standings

- Note: Only the first 10 positions are included for the driver standings.

Previous race: 1987 AC Delco 500	NASCAR Winston Cup Series; 1987 season	Next race: 1987 Atlanta Journal 500

Previous race: 1987 American National Bank 200	NASCAR Winston West Series; 1987 season	Next race: 1988 7-Up 200
