= 1989 Coca-Cola 600 =

Tenth race of the 1989 NASCAR Winston Cup Series

Race details
- Race 10 of 29 in the 1989 NASCAR Winston Cup Series
- The 1989 Coca-Cola 600 program cover, featuring Darrell Waltrip, Richard Petty, and Fred Lorenzen. Artwork by NASCAR artist Sam Bass.
- Date: May 28, 1989
- Official name: 30th Annual Coca-Cola 600
- Location: Concord, North Carolina, Charlotte Motor Speedway
- Course: Permanent racing facility
- Course length: 1.5 miles (2.414 km)
- Distance: 400 laps, 600 mi (965.606 km)
- Average speed: 144.077 miles per hour (231.869 km/h)
- Attendance: 161,000

Pole position
Driver	Alan Kulwicki	AK Racing
- Time: 31.210

Most laps led
Driver	Alan Kulwicki	AK Racing
- Laps: 138

Winner
No. 17	Darrell Waltrip	Hendrick Motorsports

Television in the United States
- Network: TBS
- Announcers: Ken Squier, Johnny Hayes

Radio in the United States
- Radio: Performance Racing Network

The 1989 Coca-Cola 600 was the 10th stock car race of the 1989 NASCAR Winston Cup Series season and the 30th iteration of the event. The race was held on Sunday, May 28, 1989, before an audience of 161,000 in Concord, North Carolina, at Charlotte Motor Speedway, a 1.5 miles (2.4 km) permanent quad-oval. The race took the scheduled 400 laps to complete. With the help of a fast final pit stop, Hendrick Motorsports driver Darrell Waltrip would manage control the final laps of the race, leading the final 80 laps to take his 77th career NASCAR Winston Cup Series victory and his fourth victory of the season. To fill out the top three, Hagan Racing driver Sterling Marlin and Hendrick Motorsports driver Ken Schrader would finish second and third, respectively.

== Background ==
The layout of Charlotte Motor Speedway, the venue where the race was held.

Charlotte Motor Speedway is a motorsports complex located in Concord, North Carolina, United States 13 miles from Charlotte, North Carolina. The complex features a 1.5 miles (2.4 km) quad oval track that hosts NASCAR racing including the prestigious Coca-Cola 600 on Memorial Day weekend and the NEXTEL All-Star Challenge, as well as the UAW-GM Quality 500. The speedway was built in 1959 by Bruton Smith and is considered the home track for NASCAR with many race teams located in the Charlotte area. The track is owned and operated by Speedway Motorsports Inc. (SMI) with Marcus G. Smith (son of Bruton Smith) as track president.

=== Entry list ===
- (R) denotes rookie driver.

#	Driver	Team	Make	Sponsor
0	Delma Cowart	H. L. Waters Racing	Ford	H. L. Waters Racing
2	Ernie Irvan	U.S. Racing	Pontiac	Kroger
3	Dale Earnhardt	Richard Childress Racing	Chevrolet	GM Goodwrench Service Plus
4	Rick Wilson	Morgan–McClure Motorsports	Oldsmobile	Kodak
5	Geoff Bodine	Hendrick Motorsports	Chevrolet	Levi Garrett
6	Mark Martin	Roush Racing	Ford	Stroh's Light
06	Terry Byers	Byers Racing	Chevrolet	Byers Racing
7	Alan Kulwicki	AK Racing	Ford	Zerex
8	Bobby Hillin Jr.	Stavola Brothers Racing	Buick	Miller High Life
9	Bill Elliott	Melling Racing	Ford	Coors Light
10	Derrike Cope	Whitcomb Racing	Pontiac	Purolator
11	Terry Labonte	Junior Johnson & Associates	Ford	Budweiser
14	Tracy Leslie	A. J. Foyt Racing	Oldsmobile	Copenhagen
15	Brett Bodine	Bud Moore Engineering	Ford	Motorcraft
16	Larry Pearson (R)	Pearson Racing	Buick	Chattanooga Chew
17	Darrell Waltrip	Hendrick Motorsports	Chevrolet	Tide
18	Jim Bown	TriStar Motorsports	Pontiac	TriStar Motorsports
21	Neil Bonnett	Wood Brothers Racing	Ford	Citgo
23	Eddie Bierschwale	B&B Racing	Oldsmobile	B&B Racing
24	John McFadden	McFadden Racing	Pontiac	Alliance Training Centers
25	Ken Schrader	Hendrick Motorsports	Chevrolet	Folgers
26	Ricky Rudd	King Racing	Buick	Quaker State
27	Rusty Wallace	Blue Max Racing	Pontiac	Kodiak
28	Davey Allison	Robert Yates Racing	Ford	Texaco, Havoline
29	Dale Jarrett	Cale Yarborough Motorsports	Pontiac	Hardee's, Ghostbusters II
30	Michael Waltrip	Bahari Racing	Pontiac	Country Time
31	Jim Sauter	Bob Clark Motorsports	Pontiac	Slender You Figure Salons
33	Harry Gant	Jackson Bros. Motorsports	Oldsmobile	Skoal Bandit
34	Jimmy Spencer (R)	Frank Cicci Racing	Buick	Frank Cicci Racing
36	H. B. Bailey	Bailey Racing	Pontiac	Almeda Auto Parts
40	Ben Hess (R)	Hess Racing	Oldsmobile	Hess Racing
42	Kyle Petty	SABCO Racing	Pontiac	Peak Antifreeze
43	Richard Petty	Petty Enterprises	Pontiac	STP
47	Allan Grice	Allan Grice Racing	Pontiac	Foster's Lager
51	Butch Miller (R)	Miller Racing	Chevrolet	Fruit of the Loom
52	Jimmy Means	Jimmy Means Racing	Pontiac	Alka-Seltzer
53	Jerry O'Neil	Aroneck Racing	Chevrolet	Aroneck Racing
55	Phil Parsons	Jackson Bros. Motorsports	Oldsmobile	Skoal, Crown Central Petroleum
57	Hut Stricklin (R)	Osterlund Racing	Pontiac	Heinz
66	Rick Mast (R)	Mach 1 Racing	Chevrolet	Banquet Foods
71	Dave Marcis	Marcis Auto Racing	Chevrolet	Lifebuoy
73	Don Hume	Barkdoll Racing	Oldsmobile	Barkdoll Racing
75	Morgan Shepherd	RahMoc Enterprises	Pontiac	Valvoline
83	Lake Speed	Speed Racing	Oldsmobile	Bull's-Eye Barbecue Sauce
84	Dick Trickle (R)	Stavola Brothers Racing	Buick	Miller High Life
88	Greg Sacks	Baker–Schiff Racing	Pontiac	Crisco
89	Rodney Combs	Mueller Brothers Racing	Pontiac	Evinrude Outboard Motors
90	Chad Little (R)	Donlavey Racing	Ford	Donlavey Racing
93	Charlie Baker	Salmon Racing	Buick	Salmon Racing
94	Sterling Marlin	Hagan Racing	Oldsmobile	Sunoco
95	Slick Johnson	Sadler Brothers Racing	Chevrolet	Sadler Brothers Racing

== Qualifying ==
Qualifying was split into two rounds. The first round was held on Wednesday, May 24, at 3:00 PM EST. Each driver would have one lap to set a time. During the first round, the top 20 drivers in the round would be guaranteed a starting spot in the race. If a driver was not able to guarantee a spot in the first round, they had the option to scrub their time from the first round and try and run a faster lap time in a second round qualifying run, held on Thursday, May 25, at 2:00 PM EST. As with the first round, each driver would have one lap to set a time. For this specific race, positions 21-40 would be decided on time, and depending on who needed it, a select amount of positions were given to cars who had not otherwise qualified but were high enough in owner's points; up to two were given.

Alan Kulwicki, driving for his own AK Racing team, would win the pole, setting a time of 31.210 and an average speed of 173.021 miles per hour (278.450 km/h) in the first round.

Nine drivers would fail to qualify.

=== Full qualifying results ===
Pos.	#	Driver	Team	Make	Time	Speed
1	7	Alan Kulwicki	AK Racing	Ford	31.210	173.021
2	6	Mark Martin	Roush Racing	Ford	31.277	172.651
3	25	Ken Schrader	Hendrick Motorsports	Chevrolet	31.390	172.029
4	17	Darrell Waltrip	Hendrick Motorsports	Chevrolet	31.480	171.537
5	4	Rick Wilson	Morgan–McClure Motorsports	Oldsmobile	31.540	171.211
6	27	Rusty Wallace	Blue Max Racing	Pontiac	31.570	171.048
7	30	Michael Waltrip	Bahari Racing	Pontiac	31.586	170.962
8	33	Harry Gant	Jackson Bros. Motorsports	Oldsmobile	31.620	170.778
9	26	Ricky Rudd	King Racing	Buick	31.656	170.584
10	15	Brett Bodine	Bud Moore Engineering	Ford	31.726	170.207
11	43	Richard Petty	Petty Enterprises	Pontiac	31.785	169.891
12	11	Terry Labonte	Junior Johnson & Associates	Ford	31.803	169.795
13	5	Geoff Bodine	Hendrick Motorsports	Chevrolet	31.823	169.689
14	3	Dale Earnhardt	Richard Childress Racing	Chevrolet	31.836	169.619
15	9	Bill Elliott	Melling Racing	Ford	31.838	169.609
16	84	Dick Trickle (R)	Stavola Brothers Racing	Buick	31.840	169.603
17	28	Davey Allison	Robert Yates Racing	Ford	31.845	169.571
18	94	Sterling Marlin	Hagan Racing	Oldsmobile	31.884	169.364
19	88	Greg Sacks	Baker–Schiff Racing	Pontiac	31.885	169.359
20	83	Lake Speed	Speed Racing	Oldsmobile	31.887	169.348
Failed to lock in Round 1
21	16	Larry Pearson (R)	Pearson Racing	Buick	31.960	168.961
22	10	Derrike Cope	Whitcomb Racing	Pontiac	31.972	168.898
23	75	Morgan Shepherd	RahMoc Enterprises	Pontiac	31.988	168.813
24	29	Dale Jarrett	Cale Yarborough Motorsports	Pontiac	32.010	168.697
25	21	Neil Bonnett	Wood Brothers Racing	Ford	32.018	168.655
26	57	Hut Stricklin (R)	Osterlund Racing	Pontiac	32.023	168.629
27	8	Bobby Hillin Jr.	Stavola Brothers Racing	Buick	32.051	168.481
28	51	Butch Miller (R)	Miller Racing	Chevrolet	32.065	168.408
29	14	Tracy Leslie	A. J. Foyt Racing	Oldsmobile	32.075	168.355
30	40	Ben Hess (R)	Hess Racing	Oldsmobile	32.098	168.235
31	55	Phil Parsons	Jackson Bros. Motorsports	Oldsmobile	32.110	168.172
32	47	Allan Grice	Allan Grice Racing	Pontiac	32.134	168.046
33	42	Kyle Petty	SABCO Racing	Chevrolet	32.135	168.041
34	52	Jimmy Means	Jimmy Means Racing	Pontiac	32.166	167.879
35	06	Terry Byers	Byers Racing	Chevrolet	32.176	167.827
36	2	Ernie Irvan	U.S. Racing	Pontiac	32.178	167.817
37	53	Jerry O'Neil	Aroneck Racing	Chevrolet	32.195	167.728
38	31	Jim Sauter	Bob Clark Motorsports	Pontiac	32.201	167.697
39	90	Chad Little (R)	Donlavey Racing	Ford	32.212	167.639
40	23	Eddie Bierschwale	B&B Racing	Oldsmobile	32.255	167.416
Provisionals
41	66	Rick Mast (R)	Mach 1 Racing	Chevrolet	32.290	167.234
42	71	Dave Marcis	Marcis Auto Racing	Chevrolet	32.646	165.411
Failed to qualify
43	89	Rodney Combs	Mueller Brothers Racing	Pontiac	-*	-*
44	18	Jim Bown	TriStar Motorsports	Pontiac	-*	-*
45	34	Jimmy Spencer (R)	Frank Cicci Racing	Buick	-*	-*
46	95	Slick Johnson	Sadler Brothers Racing	Chevrolet	-*	-*
47	36	H. B. Bailey	Bailey Racing	Pontiac	-*	-*
48	93	Charlie Baker	Salmon Racing	Chevrolet	-*	-*
49	24	John McFadden	McFadden Racing	Pontiac	-*	-*
50	73	Don Hume	Barkdoll Racing	Oldsmobile	-*	-*
51	0	Delma Cowart	H. L. Waters Racing	Ford	-*	-*
Official first round qualifying results
Official starting lineup

== Race results ==
Fin	St	#	Driver	Team	Make	Laps	Led	Status	Pts	Winnings
1	4	17	Darrell Waltrip	Hendrick Motorsports	Chevrolet	400	87	running	180	$126,400
2	18	94	Sterling Marlin	Hagan Racing	Oldsmobile	400	17	running	175	$61,675
3	3	25	Ken Schrader	Hendrick Motorsports	Chevrolet	400	1	running	170	$44,275
4	13	5	Geoff Bodine	Hendrick Motorsports	Chevrolet	399	0	running	160	$30,950
5	15	9	Bill Elliott	Melling Racing	Ford	399	12	running	160	$32,305
6	2	6	Mark Martin	Roush Racing	Ford	399	53	running	155	$29,675
7	25	21	Neil Bonnett	Wood Brothers Racing	Ford	399	0	running	146	$17,800
8	10	15	Brett Bodine	Bud Moore Engineering	Ford	398	0	running	142	$16,900
9	27	8	Bobby Hillin Jr.	Stavola Brothers Racing	Buick	397	0	running	138	$15,200
10	9	26	Ricky Rudd	King Racing	Buick	397	0	running	134	$16,925
11	41	66	Rick Mast (R)	Mach 1 Racing	Chevrolet	396	0	running	130	$13,107
12	22	10	Derrike Cope	Whitcomb Racing	Pontiac	396	0	running	127	$8,500
13	31	55	Phil Parsons	Jackson Bros. Motorsports	Oldsmobile	395	0	running	124	$11,725
14	26	57	Hut Stricklin (R)	Osterlund Racing	Pontiac	395	0	running	121	$7,625
15	36	2	Ernie Irvan	U.S. Racing	Pontiac	394	0	running	118	$9,175
16	42	71	Dave Marcis	Marcis Auto Racing	Chevrolet	394	0	running	115	$9,650
17	33	42	Kyle Petty	SABCO Racing	Chevrolet	392	0	running	112	$6,000
18	39	90	Chad Little (R)	Donlavey Racing	Ford	392	0	running	109	$5,650
19	11	43	Richard Petty	Petty Enterprises	Pontiac	391	0	running	106	$6,400
20	30	40	Ben Hess (R)	Hess Racing	Oldsmobile	388	0	running	103	$5,775
21	35	06	Terry Byers	Byers Racing	Chevrolet	379	0	running	100	$4,700
22	21	16	Larry Pearson (R)	Pearson Racing	Buick	377	0	running	97	$5,450
23	1	7	Alan Kulwicki	AK Racing	Ford	371	138	engine	104	$58,500
24	20	83	Lake Speed	Speed Racing	Oldsmobile	364	0	running	91	$6,800
25	29	14	Tracy Leslie	A. J. Foyt Racing	Oldsmobile	360	0	crank	88	$3,925
26	37	53	Jerry O'Neil	Aroneck Racing	Chevrolet	353	0	running	85	$3,100
27	7	30	Michael Waltrip	Bahari Racing	Pontiac	333	0	engine	82	$6,150
28	24	29	Dale Jarrett	Cale Yarborough Motorsports	Pontiac	331	0	engine	79	$5,200
29	16	84	Dick Trickle (R)	Stavola Brothers Racing	Buick	330	0	oil line	76	$4,975
30	19	88	Greg Sacks	Baker–Schiff Racing	Pontiac	320	2	accident	78	$4,800
31	6	27	Rusty Wallace	Blue Max Racing	Pontiac	306	22	engine	75	$13,950
32	23	75	Morgan Shepherd	RahMoc Enterprises	Pontiac	303	0	engine	67	$10,000
33	17	28	Davey Allison	Robert Yates Racing	Ford	298	1	engine	69	$10,550
34	32	47	Allan Grice	Allan Grice Racing	Pontiac	294	0	engine	61	$1,900
35	5	4	Rick Wilson	Morgan–McClure Motorsports	Oldsmobile	292	15	running	63	$6,975
36	40	23	Eddie Bierschwale	B&B Racing	Oldsmobile	242	0	accident	55	$2,400
37	38	31	Jim Sauter	Bob Clark Motorsports	Pontiac	236	0	engine	52	$1,775
38	14	3	Dale Earnhardt	Richard Childress Racing	Chevrolet	223	2	engine	54	$10,750
39	12	11	Terry Labonte	Junior Johnson & Associates	Ford	186	0	engine	46	$8,725
40	8	33	Harry Gant	Jackson Bros. Motorsports	Oldsmobile	148	50	engine	48	$10,600
41	34	52	Jimmy Means	Jimmy Means Racing	Pontiac	113	0	engine	40	$1,700
42	28	51	Butch Miller (R)	Miller Racing	Chevrolet	24	0	wheel bearing	37	$2,200
Failed to qualify
43		89	Rodney Combs	Mueller Brothers Racing	Pontiac					
44		18	Jim Bown	TriStar Motorsports	Pontiac					
45		34	Jimmy Spencer (R)	Frank Cicci Racing	Buick					
46		95	Slick Johnson	Sadler Brothers Racing	Chevrolet					
47		36	H. B. Bailey	Bailey Racing	Pontiac					
48		93	Charlie Baker	Salmon Racing	Chevrolet					
49		24	John McFadden	McFadden Racing	Pontiac					
50		73	Don Hume	Barkdoll Racing	Oldsmobile					
51		0	Delma Cowart	H. L. Waters Racing	Ford					
Official race results

== Standings after the race ==
Drivers' Championship standings

	Pos	Driver	Points
1	1	Darrell Waltrip	1,479
1	2	Geoff Bodine	1,458 (-21)
2	3	Dale Earnhardt	1,430 (-49)
	4	Alan Kulwicki	1,375 (–104)
3	5	Sterling Marlin	1,374 (–105)
1	6	Mark Martin	1,368 (–111)
2	7	Rusty Wallace	1,313 (–166)
2	8	Davey Allison	1,291 (–188)
4	9	Ken Schrader	1,238 (–241)
4	10	Bill Elliott	1,211 (–268)
Official driver's standings

- Note: Only the first 10 positions are included for the driver standings.

Previous race: 1989 Winston 500	NASCAR Winston Cup Series; 1989 season	Next race: 1989 Budweiser 500
