= 1989 Pepsi 400 =

15th race of the 1989 NASCAR Winston Cup Series

Race details
- Race 15 of 29 in the 1989 NASCAR Winston Cup Series
- The 1989 Pepsi 400 program cover.
- Date: July 1, 1989
- Official name: 31st Annual Pepsi 400
- Location: Daytona Beach, Florida, Daytona International Speedway
- Course: Permanent racing facility
- Course length: 2.5 miles (4.0 km)
- Distance: 160 laps, 400 mi (643.737 km)
- Scheduled distance: 160 laps, 400 mi (643.737 km)
- Average speed: 132.207 miles per hour (212.767 km/h)
- Attendance: 95,000

Pole position
Driver	Mark Martin	Roush Racing
- Time: 46.909

Most laps led
Driver	Bill Elliott	Melling Racing
- Laps: 50

Winner
No. 28	Davey Allison	Robert Yates Racing

Television in the United States
- Network: ESPN
- Announcers: Bob Jenkins, Benny Parsons, Ned Jarrett

Radio in the United States
- Radio: Motor Racing Network

The 1989 Pepsi 400 was the 15th stock car race of the 1989 NASCAR Winston Cup Series season and the 31st iteration of the event. The race was held on Saturday, July 1, 1989, before an audience of 95,000 in Daytona Beach, Florida at Daytona International Speedway, a 2.5 miles (4.0 km) permanent triangular-shaped superspeedway. The race took the scheduled 160 laps to complete. In the final laps of the race, Robert Yates Racing driver Davey Allison would make a late-race charge to the front, passing for the lead with five laps left in the race to take his sixth career NASCAR Winston Cup Series victory and his second and final victory of the season. To fill out the top three, RahMoc Enterprises driver Morgan Shepherd and Jackson Bros. Motorsports driver Phil Parsons would finish second and third, respectively.

== Background ==
The layout of Daytona International Speedway, the venue where the race was held.

Daytona International Speedway is one of three superspeedways to hold NASCAR races, the other two being Indianapolis Motor Speedway and Talladega Superspeedway. The standard track at Daytona International Speedway is a four-turn superspeedway that is 2.5 miles (4.0 km) long. The track's turns are banked at 31 degrees, while the front stretch, the location of the finish line, is banked at 18 degrees.

=== Entry list ===
- (R) denotes rookie driver.

#	Driver	Team	Make	Sponsor
0	Delma Cowart	H. L. Waters Racing	Ford	H. L. Waters Racing
2	Ernie Irvan	U.S. Racing	Pontiac	Kroger
3	Dale Earnhardt	Richard Childress Racing	Chevrolet	GM Goodwrench Service Plus
4	Rick Wilson	Morgan–McClure Motorsports	Oldsmobile	Kodak
5	Geoff Bodine	Hendrick Motorsports	Chevrolet	Levi Garrett
6	Mark Martin	Roush Racing	Ford	Stroh's Light
06	Terry Byers	Byers Racing	Buick	Byers Racing
7	Alan Kulwicki	AK Racing	Ford	Zerex
8	Bobby Hillin Jr.	Stavola Brothers Racing	Buick	Miller High Life
9	Bill Elliott	Melling Racing	Ford	Coors Light
10	Derrike Cope	Whitcomb Racing	Pontiac	Purolator
11	Terry Labonte	Junior Johnson & Associates	Ford	Budweiser
14	A. J. Foyt	A. J. Foyt Racing	Oldsmobile	Copenhagen
15	Brett Bodine	Bud Moore Engineering	Ford	Motorcraft
16	Larry Pearson (R)	Pearson Racing	Buick	Chattanooga Chew
17	Darrell Waltrip	Hendrick Motorsports	Chevrolet	Tide
19	Bill Ingram	Gray Racing	Oldsmobile	Gray Racing
21	Neil Bonnett	Wood Brothers Racing	Ford	Citgo
22	Grant Adcox	Adcox Racing	Chevrolet	Herb Adcox Chevrolet
24	John McFadden	McFadden Racing	Pontiac	Alliance Training Centers
25	Ken Schrader	Hendrick Motorsports	Chevrolet	Folgers
26	Ricky Rudd	King Racing	Buick	Quaker State
27	Rusty Wallace	Blue Max Racing	Pontiac	Kodiak
28	Davey Allison	Robert Yates Racing	Ford	Texaco, Havoline
29	Dale Jarrett	Cale Yarborough Motorsports	Pontiac	Hardee's
30	Michael Waltrip	Bahari Racing	Pontiac	Country Time
33	Harry Gant	Jackson Bros. Motorsports	Oldsmobile	Skoal Bandit
42	Kyle Petty	SABCO Racing	Pontiac	Peak Antifreeze
43	Richard Petty	Petty Enterprises	Pontiac	STP
45	Patty Moise	Moise Racing	Buick	Amway Freedom Fuel Additive
50	Jim Sauter	Dingman Brothers Racing	Pontiac	Valvoline
52	Jimmy Means	Jimmy Means Racing	Pontiac	Alka-Seltzer
55	Phil Parsons	Jackson Bros. Motorsports	Oldsmobile	Skoal, Crown Central Petroleum
57	Hut Stricklin (R)	Osterlund Racing	Pontiac	Heinz
59	Mark Gibson	Collins Racing	Pontiac	Altman American Air Conditioning
70	J. D. McDuffie	McDuffie Racing	Pontiac	Rumple Furniture
71	Dave Marcis	Marcis Auto Racing	Chevrolet	Lifebuoy
73	Phil Barkdoll	Barkdoll Racing	Oldsmobile	Deery Brothers
75	Morgan Shepherd	RahMoc Enterprises	Pontiac	Valvoline
83	Lake Speed	Speed Racing	Oldsmobile	Bull's-Eye Barbecue Sauce
84	Dick Trickle (R)	Stavola Brothers Racing	Buick	Miller High Life
88	Jimmy Spencer (R)	Baker–Schiff Racing	Pontiac	Crisco
90	Stan Barrett	Donlavey Racing	Ford	Hawaiian Tropic
93	Charlie Baker	Salmon Racing	Buick	Salmon Racing
94	Sterling Marlin	Hagan Racing	Oldsmobile	Sunoco

== Qualifying ==
Qualifying was split into two rounds. The first round was held on Thursday, June 29, at 10:00 AM EST. Each driver would have one lap to set a time. During the first round, the top 20 drivers in the round would be guaranteed a starting spot in the race. If a driver was not able to guarantee a spot in the first round, they had the option to scrub their time from the first round and try and run a faster lap time in a second round qualifying run, held on Friday, June 30, at 11:00 AM EST. As with the first round, each driver would have one lap to set a time. For this specific race, positions 21-40 would be decided on time, and depending on who needed it, a select amount of positions were given to cars who had not otherwise qualified but were high enough in owner's points; up to two provisionals were given.

Mark Martin, driving for Roush Racing, would win the pole, setting a time of 46.909 and an average speed of 191.861 miles per hour (308.770 km/h) in the first round.

Five drivers would fail to qualify.

=== Full qualifying results ===
Pos.	#	Driver	Team	Make	Time	Speed
1	6	Mark Martin	Roush Racing	Ford	46.909	191.861
2	9	Bill Elliott	Melling Racing	Ford	47.114	191.026
3	33	Harry Gant	Jackson Bros. Motorsports	Oldsmobile	47.357	190.046
4	21	Neil Bonnett	Wood Brothers Racing	Ford	47.457	189.645
5	25	Ken Schrader	Hendrick Motorsports	Chevrolet	47.526	189.370
6	15	Brett Bodine	Bud Moore Engineering	Ford	47.541	189.310
7	4	Rick Wilson	Morgan–McClure Motorsports	Oldsmobile	47.574	189.179
8	28	Davey Allison	Robert Yates Racing	Ford	47.720	188.600
9	7	Alan Kulwicki	AK Racing	Ford	47.764	188.426
10	55	Phil Parsons	Jackson Bros. Motorsports	Oldsmobile	47.897	187.903
11	75	Morgan Shepherd	RahMoc Enterprises	Pontiac	47.973	187.606
12	5	Geoff Bodine	Hendrick Motorsports	Chevrolet	48.080	187.188
13	3	Dale Earnhardt	Richard Childress Racing	Chevrolet	48.124	187.017
14	17	Darrell Waltrip	Hendrick Motorsports	Chevrolet	48.156	186.893
15	30	Michael Waltrip	Bahari Racing	Pontiac	48.205	186.703
16	84	Dick Trickle (R)	Stavola Brothers Racing	Buick	48.243	186.556
17	11	Terry Labonte	Junior Johnson	Ford	48.268	186.459
18	10	Derrike Cope	Whitcomb Racing	Pontiac	48.318	186.266
19	14	A. J. Foyt	A. J. Foyt Racing	Oldsmobile	48.417	185.885
20	8	Bobby Hillin Jr.	Stavola Brothers Racing	Buick	48.451	185.755
Failed to lock in Round 1
21	73	Phil Barkdoll	Barkdoll Racing	Oldsmobile	48.454	185.743
22	94	Sterling Marlin	Hagan Racing	Oldsmobile	48.496	185.582
23	27	Rusty Wallace	Blue Max Racing	Pontiac	48.737	184.665
24	16	Larry Pearson (R)	Pearson Racing	Buick	48.756	184.593
25	83	Lake Speed	Speed Racing	Oldsmobile	48.789	184.468
26	43	Richard Petty	Petty Enterprises	Pontiac	48.968	183.793
27	90	Stan Barrett	Donlavey Racing	Ford	48.978	183.756
28	42	Kyle Petty	SABCO Racing	Pontiac	48.981	183.745
29	52	Jimmy Means	Jimmy Means Racing	Pontiac	48.999	183.677
30	29	Dale Jarrett	Cale Yarborough Motorsports	Pontiac	49.018	183.606
31	2	Ernie Irvan	U.S. Racing	Pontiac	49.042	183.516
32	88	Jimmy Spencer (R)	Baker–Schiff Racing	Pontiac	49.096	183.314
33	71	Dave Marcis	Marcis Auto Racing	Chevrolet	49.107	183.273
34	57	Hut Stricklin (R)	Osterlund Racing	Pontiac	49.360	182.334
35	45	Patty Moise	Moise Racing	Buick	49.388	182.231
36	24	John McFadden	McFadden Racing	Pontiac	49.429	182.079
37	22	Grant Adcox	Adcox Racing	Chevrolet	49.535	181.690
38	26	Ricky Rudd	King Racing	Buick	49.665	181.214
39	50	Jim Sauter	Dingman Brothers Racing	Pontiac	49.665	181.214
40	59	Mark Gibson	Collins Racing	Pontiac	49.746	180.919
Failed to qualify
41	19	Bill Ingram	Gray Racing	Oldsmobile	49.774	180.817
42	93	Charlie Baker	Salmon Racing	Buick	49.809	180.690
43	70	J. D. McDuffie	McDuffie Racing	Pontiac	50.259	179.072
44	06	Terry Byers	Byers Racing	Buick	50.732	177.403
45	0	Delma Cowart	H. L. Waters Racing	Ford	-	-
Official first round qualifying results
Official starting lineup

== Race results ==
Fin	St	#	Driver	Team	Make	Laps	Led	Status	Pts	Winnings
1	8	28	Davey Allison	Robert Yates Racing	Ford	160	19	running	180	$65,000
2	11	75	Morgan Shepherd	RahMoc Enterprises	Pontiac	160	4	running	175	$39,975
3	10	55	Phil Parsons	Jackson Bros. Motorsports	Oldsmobile	160	1	running	170	$27,700
4	2	9	Bill Elliott	Melling Racing	Ford	160	50	running	170	$27,750
5	9	7	Alan Kulwicki	AK Racing	Ford	160	0	running	155	$19,855
6	17	11	Terry Labonte	Junior Johnson	Ford	160	14	running	155	$17,460
7	22	94	Sterling Marlin	Hagan Racing	Oldsmobile	160	0	running	146	$15,485
8	16	84	Dick Trickle (R)	Stavola Brothers Racing	Buick	160	0	running	142	$13,085
9	38	26	Ricky Rudd	King Racing	Buick	160	0	running	138	$16,842
10	34	57	Hut Stricklin (R)	Osterlund Racing	Pontiac	160	0	running	134	$11,410
11	6	15	Brett Bodine	Bud Moore Engineering	Ford	160	0	running	130	$9,900
12	29	52	Jimmy Means	Jimmy Means Racing	Pontiac	160	0	running	127	$5,685
13	37	22	Grant Adcox	Adcox Racing	Chevrolet	160	0	running	124	$5,520
14	28	42	Kyle Petty	SABCO Racing	Pontiac	160	0	running	121	$5,205
15	21	73	Phil Barkdoll	Barkdoll Racing	Oldsmobile	159	0	running	118	$6,390
16	1	6	Mark Martin	Roush Racing	Ford	159	28	running	120	$13,085
17	23	27	Rusty Wallace	Blue Max Racing	Pontiac	159	0	running	112	$13,580
18	13	3	Dale Earnhardt	Richard Childress Racing	Chevrolet	158	33	running	114	$13,180
19	14	17	Darrell Waltrip	Hendrick Motorsports	Chevrolet	158	0	running	106	$12,780
20	26	43	Richard Petty	Petty Enterprises	Pontiac	158	0	running	103	$6,505
21	4	21	Neil Bonnett	Wood Brothers Racing	Ford	156	0	running	100	$7,295
22	12	5	Geoff Bodine	Hendrick Motorsports	Chevrolet	155	4	running	102	$10,800
23	31	2	Ernie Irvan	U.S. Racing	Pontiac	147	0	running	94	$4,755
24	25	83	Lake Speed	Speed Racing	Oldsmobile	143	0	crash	91	$6,660
25	33	71	Dave Marcis	Marcis Auto Racing	Chevrolet	143	0	crash	88	$6,565
26	18	10	Derrike Cope	Whitcomb Racing	Pontiac	143	0	crash	85	$4,195
27	32	88	Jimmy Spencer (R)	Baker–Schiff Racing	Pontiac	143	0	crash	82	$5,995
28	20	8	Bobby Hillin Jr.	Stavola Brothers Racing	Buick	140	2	crash	84	$5,830
29	7	4	Rick Wilson	Morgan–McClure Motorsports	Oldsmobile	109	4	crash	81	$5,710
30	24	16	Larry Pearson (R)	Pearson Racing	Buick	108	0	crash	73	$3,640
31	30	29	Dale Jarrett	Cale Yarborough Motorsports	Pontiac	108	0	crash	70	$5,510
32	3	33	Harry Gant	Jackson Bros. Motorsports	Oldsmobile	102	0	rear end	67	$10,105
33	40	59	Mark Gibson	Collins Racing	Pontiac	100	0	crash	64	$2,880
34	15	30	Michael Waltrip	Bahari Racing	Pontiac	89	0	crash	61	$5,405
35	19	14	A. J. Foyt	A. J. Foyt Racing	Oldsmobile	89	0	crash	58	$2,780
36	5	25	Ken Schrader	Hendrick Motorsports	Chevrolet	53	1	crash	60	$10,555
37	27	90	Stan Barrett	Donlavey Racing	Ford	36	0	driveshaft	0	$2,730
38	39	50	Jim Sauter	Dingman Brothers Racing	Pontiac	5	0	engine	49	$2,715
39	35	45	Patty Moise	Moise Racing	Buick	0	0	crash	46	$2,695
40	36	24	John McFadden	McFadden Racing	Pontiac	0	0	crash	43	$2,664
Failed to qualify
41		19	Bill Ingram	Gray Racing	Oldsmobile					
42		93	Charlie Baker	Salmon Racing	Buick					
43		70	J. D. McDuffie	McDuffie Racing	Pontiac					
44		06	Terry Byers	Byers Racing	Buick					
45		0	Delma Cowart	H. L. Waters Racing	Ford					
Official race results

== Standings after the race ==
Drivers' Championship standings

	Pos	Driver	Points
	1	Dale Earnhardt	2,171
	2	Rusty Wallace	2,047 (-124)
	3	Darrell Waltrip	2,014 (-157)
	4	Mark Martin	1,978 (–193)
	5	Bill Elliott	1,973 (–198)
	6	Sterling Marlin	1,940 (–231)
2	7	Ricky Rudd	1,887 (–284)
1	8	Geoff Bodine	1,879 (–292)
2	9	Davey Allison	1,861 (–310)
	10	Terry Labonte	1,855 (–316)
Official driver's standings

- Note: Only the first 10 positions are included for the driver standings.

Previous race: 1989 Miller High Life 400 (Michigan)	NASCAR Winston Cup Series; 1989 season	Next race: 1989 AC Spark Plug 500
