= 1988 Oakwood Homes 500 =

25th race of the 1988 NASCAR Winston Cup Series

Race details
- Race 25 of 29 in the 1988 NASCAR Winston Cup Series
- The 1988 Oakwood Homes 500 program cover, featuring Terry Labonte. Artwork by NASCAR artist Sam Bass.
- Date: October 9, 1988
- Official name: 29th Annual Oakwood Homes 500
- Location: Concord, North Carolina, Charlotte Motor Speedway
- Course: Permanent racing facility
- Course length: 2.41 km (1.5 miles)
- Distance: 334 laps, 501 mi (806.281 km)
- Scheduled distance: 334 laps, 501 mi (806.281 km)
- Average speed: 130.677 miles per hour (210.304 km/h)
- Attendance: 145,000

Pole position
Driver	Alan Kulwicki	AK Racing
- Time: 30.700

Most laps led
Driver	Dale Earnhardt	Richard Childress Racing
- Laps: 83

Winner
No. 27	Rusty Wallace	Blue Max Racing

Television in the United States
- Network: Score (tape-delayed)
- Announcers: Pat Patterson, Bob Latford

Radio in the United States
- Radio: Performance Racing Network

The 1988 Oakwood Homes 500 was the 25th stock car race of the 1988 NASCAR Winston Cup Series season and the 29th iteration of the event. The race was held on Sunday, October 9, 1988, before an audience of 145,000 in Concord, North Carolina, at Charlotte Motor Speedway, a 1.5 miles (2.4 km) permanent quad-oval. The race took the scheduled 334 laps to complete. Coming back from a two-lap deficit, Blue Max Racing's Rusty Wallace managed to defend a challenge from Hendrick Motorsports' Darrell Waltrip in the closing laps of the race to take his seventh career NASCAR Winston Cup Series victory and his third victory of the season. To fill out the top three, the aforementioned Darrell Waltrip and Bud Moore Engineering's Brett Bodine finished second and third, respectively.

== Background ==
The layout of Charlotte Motor Speedway, the venue where the race was held.

Charlotte Motor Speedway is a motorsports complex located in Concord, North Carolina, United States 13 miles from Charlotte, North Carolina. The complex features a 1.5 miles (2.4 km) quad oval track that hosts NASCAR racing including the prestigious Coca-Cola 600 on Memorial Day weekend and the NEXTEL All-Star Challenge, as well as the UAW-GM Quality 500. The speedway was built in 1959 by Bruton Smith and is considered the home track for NASCAR with many race teams located in the Charlotte area. The track is owned and operated by Speedway Motorsports Inc. (SMI) with Marcus G. Smith (son of Bruton Smith) as track president.

=== Entry list ===
- (R) denotes rookie driver.

#	Driver	Team	Make	Sponsor
0	Delma Cowart	H. L. Waters Racing	Chevrolet	Heyward Grooms Construction
00	Gary Brooks	Brooks Racing	Chevrolet	Brooks Racing
1	Dale Jarrett	Ellington Racing	Buick	Port-A-Lube
01	Mickey Gibbs	Gibbs Racing	Ford	Gibbs–West Tractor
2	Ernie Irvan (R)	U.S. Racing	Chevrolet	Kroger
3	Dale Earnhardt	Richard Childress Racing	Chevrolet	GM Goodwrench
03	Ronnie Silver	Bahari Racing	Pontiac	Country Time
03	Peter Sospenzo	Sospenzo Racing	Chevrolet	Sospenzo Racing
4	Rick Wilson	Morgan–McClure Motorsports	Oldsmobile	Kodak
5	Geoff Bodine	Hendrick Motorsports	Chevrolet	Levi Garrett
6	Mark Martin	Roush Racing	Ford	Stroh's Light
7	Alan Kulwicki	AK Racing	Ford	Zerex
8	Bobby Hillin Jr.	Stavola Brothers Racing	Buick	Miller High Life
9	Bill Elliott	Melling Racing	Ford	Coors Light
10	Ken Bouchard (R)	Whitcomb Racing	Ford	Whitcomb Racing
11	Terry Labonte	Junior Johnson & Associates	Chevrolet	Budweiser
12	Mike Alexander	Stavola Brothers Racing	Buick	Miller High Life
14	A. J. Foyt	A. J. Foyt Racing	Oldsmobile	Copenhagen
15	Brett Bodine	Bud Moore Engineering	Ford	Crisco
16	Larry Pearson	Pearson Racing	Chevrolet	Chattanooga Chew
17	Darrell Waltrip	Hendrick Motorsports	Chevrolet	Tide
19	Chad Little	Little Racing	Ford	Coors Extra Gold
21	Kyle Petty	Wood Brothers Racing	Ford	Citgo
22	Rodney Combs	Richard Childress Racing	Chevrolet	Richard Childress Racing
23	Eddie Bierschwale	B&B Racing	Oldsmobile	Wayne Paging
24	John McFadden	McFadden Racing	Chevrolet	Alliance Training Centers
25	Ken Schrader	Hendrick Motorsports	Chevrolet	Folgers
26	Ricky Rudd	King Racing	Buick	Quaker State
27	Rusty Wallace	Blue Max Racing	Pontiac	Kodiak
28	Davey Allison	Ranier-Lundy Racing	Ford	Texaco, Havoline
29	Cale Yarborough	Cale Yarborough Motorsports	Oldsmobile	Hardee's
30	Michael Waltrip	Bahari Racing	Pontiac	Country Time
31	Lee Faulk	Bob Clark Motorsports	Oldsmobile	Slender You Figure Salons
32	Philip Duffie	Duffie Racing	Buick	Bob Beard Buick
32	Johnny Rutherford	Bob Clark Motorsports	Oldsmobile	Slender You Figure Salons
33	Harry Gant	Mach 1 Racing	Chevrolet	Skoal Bandit
34	Connie Saylor	AAG Racing	Buick	Allen's Associated Glass
36	H. B. Bailey	Bailey Racing	Pontiac	Almeda Auto Parts
40	Ben Hess	Hess Racing	Oldsmobile	Hess Racing
43	Richard Petty	Petty Enterprises	Pontiac	STP
44	Sterling Marlin	Hagan Racing	Oldsmobile	Piedmont Airlines
47	Rob Moroso	Hendrick Motorsports	Chevrolet	Peak Antifreeze
50	Charlie Glotzbach	Dingman Brothers Racing	Pontiac	Dingman Brothers Racing
52	Jimmy Means	Jimmy Means Racing	Pontiac	Eureka
55	Phil Parsons	Jackson Bros. Motorsports	Oldsmobile	Skoal, Crown Central Petroleum
57	Morgan Shepherd	Osterlund Racing	Buick	Heinz
59	Mark Gibson	Gibson Racing	Pontiac	Gibson Racing
63	Jocko Maggiacomo	Linro Motorsports	Chevrolet	Linro Motorsports
64	Mike Potter	Potter Racing	Chevrolet	Eagle Engines
67	Brad Teague	Arrington Racing	Ford	Pannill Sweatshirts
68	Derrike Cope	Testa Racing	Ford	Purolator
70	J. D. McDuffie	McDuffie Racing	Pontiac	Rumple Furniture
71	Dave Marcis	Marcis Auto Racing	Chevrolet	Lifebuoy
73	Joe Ruttman	Barkdoll Racing	Chevrolet	Fab Detergent
74	Randy LaJoie	Wawak Racing	Chevrolet	Nelson Contracting
75	Neil Bonnett	RahMoc Enterprises	Pontiac	Valvoline
77	Ken Ragan (Note: During a shakedown run held on Wednesday, October 5, Ragan crashed after his car experienced a stuck throttle. As a result of the crash, Ragan suffered numerous bone fractures and was listed in critical condition after the accident. The team did not have a backup car or driver, so the team withdrew from the race.)	Ragan Racing	Ford	Bob Beard Ford
83	Lake Speed	Speed Racing	Oldsmobile	Wynn's, Kmart
87	Randy Baker	Buck Baker Racing	Oldsmobile	Sony Magnetic Tape
88	Greg Sacks	Baker-Schiff Racing	Oldsmobile	Red Baron Frozen Pizza
89	Jim Sauter	Mueller Brothers Racing	Pontiac	Evinrude Outboard Motors
90	Benny Parsons	Donlavey Racing	Ford	Bull's-Eye Barbecue Sauce
93	Troy Beebe	Midgley Racing	Pontiac	Taco Bell
95	Slick Johnson	Sadler Brothers Racing	Chevrolet	Sadler Brothers Racing
96	Dana Patten	Patten Racing	Buick	U.S. Chrome
97	Tommy Ellis	Winkle Motorsports	Buick	AC Spark Plug
98	Brad Noffsinger (R)	Curb Racing	Buick	Sunoco

== Qualifying ==
Qualifying was split into two rounds. The first round was held on Wednesday, October 5, at 3:00 PM EST. Each driver had one lap to set a time. During the first round, the top 20 drivers in the round would be guaranteed a starting spot in the race. If a driver was not able to guarantee a spot in the first round, they had the option to scrub their time from the first round and try and run a faster lap time in a second round qualifying run, held on Thursday, October 6, at 2:00 PM EST. As with the first round, each driver had one lap to set a time. For this specific race, positions 21-40 was decided on time, and depending on who needed it, a select amount of positions were given to cars who had not otherwise qualified but were high enough in owner's points; up to two were given.

Alan Kulwicki, driving for his own AK Racing team, managed to win the pole, setting a time of 30.700 and an average speed of 175.896 miles per hour (283.077 km/h) in the first round.

24 drivers failed to qualify.

=== Full qualifying results ===
Pos.	#	Driver	Team	Make	Time	Speed
1	7	Alan Kulwicki	AK Racing	Ford	30.700	175.896
2	9	Bill Elliott	Melling Racing	Ford	30.754	175.587
3	27	Rusty Wallace	Blue Max Racing	Pontiac	30.756	175.575
4	6	Mark Martin	Roush Racing	Ford	30.836	175.120
5	5	Geoff Bodine	Hendrick Motorsports	Chevrolet	30.917	174.661
6	12	Mike Alexander	Stavola Brothers Racing	Buick	30.992	174.239
7	25	Ken Schrader	Hendrick Motorsports	Chevrolet	31.064	173.835
8	33	Harry Gant	Mach 1 Racing	Chevrolet	31.074	173.779
9	44	Sterling Marlin	Hagan Racing	Oldsmobile	31.075	173.773
10	17	Darrell Waltrip	Hendrick Motorsports	Chevrolet	31.106	173.600
11	3	Dale Earnhardt	Richard Childress Racing	Chevrolet	31.119	173.527
12	30	Michael Waltrip	Bahari Racing	Pontiac	31.120	173.522
13	01	Mickey Gibbs	Gibbs Racing	Ford	31.172	173.232
14	28	Davey Allison	Ranier-Lundy Racing	Ford	31.177	173.205
15	68	Derrike Cope	Testa Racing	Ford	31.190	173.132
16	15	Brett Bodine	Bud Moore Engineering	Ford	31.240	172.855
17	88	Greg Sacks	Baker–Schiff Racing	Oldsmobile	31.335	172.331
18	55	Phil Parsons	Jackson Bros. Motorsports	Oldsmobile	31.339	172.309
19	83	Lake Speed	Speed Racing	Oldsmobile	31.372	172.128
20	29	Cale Yarborough	Cale Yarborough Motorsports	Oldsmobile	31.372	172.128
Failed to lock in the first round
21	14	A. J. Foyt	A. J. Foyt Racing	Oldsmobile	31.137	173.427
22	1	Dale Jarrett	Ellington Racing	Buick	31.331	172.353
23	21	Kyle Petty	Wood Brothers Racing	Ford	31.363	172.177
24	11	Terry Labonte	Junior Johnson & Associates	Chevrolet	31.384	172.062
25	71	Dave Marcis	Marcis Auto Racing	Chevrolet	31.397	171.991
26	73	Joe Ruttman	Barkdoll Racing	Chevrolet	31.413	171.903
27	90	Benny Parsons	Donlavey Racing	Ford	31.425	171.838
28	75	Neil Bonnett	RahMoc Enterprises	Pontiac	31.434	171.789
29	52	Jimmy Means	Jimmy Means Racing	Pontiac	31.436	171.778
30	4	Rick Wilson	Morgan–McClure Motorsports	Oldsmobile	31.449	171.707
31	89	Jim Sauter	Mueller Brothers Racing	Pontiac	31.466	171.614
32	8	Bobby Hillin Jr.	Stavola Brothers Racing	Buick	31.468	171.603
33	43	Richard Petty	Petty Enterprises	Pontiac	31.489	171.488
34	47	Rob Moroso	Hendrick Motorsports	Chevrolet	31.501	171.423
35	67	Brad Teague	Arrington Racing	Chevrolet	31.505	171.401
36	26	Ricky Rudd	King Racing	Buick	31.522	171.309
37	23	Eddie Bierschwale	B&B Racing	Oldsmobile	31.539	171.217
38	97	Tommy Ellis	Winkle Motorsports	Buick	31.543	171.195
39	57	Morgan Shepherd	Osterlund Racing	Buick	31.556	171.124
40	16	Larry Pearson	Pearson Racing	Chevrolet	31.588	170.951
Provisionals
41	10	Ken Bouchard (R)	Whitcomb Racing	Ford	-*	-*
42	31	Lee Faulk	Bob Clark Motorsports	Oldsmobile	33.470	161.339
Failed to qualify (results unknown)
43	0	Delma Cowart	H. L. Waters Racing	Chevrolet	-*	-*
44	00	Gary Brooks	Brooks Racing	Chevrolet	-*	-*
45	2	Ernie Irvan (R)	U.S. Racing	Chevrolet	-*	-*
46	03	Ronnie Silver	Bahari Racing	Pontiac	-*	-*
47	03	Peter Sospenzo	Sospenzo Racing	Chevrolet	-*	-*
48	19	Chad Little	Little Racing	Ford	-*	-*
49	22	Rodney Combs	Richard Childress Racing	Chevrolet	-*	-*
50	24	John McFadden	McFadden Racing	Chevrolet	-*	-*
51	32	Philip Duffie	Duffie Racing	Buick	-*	-*
52	32	Johnny Rutherford	Bob Clark Motorsports	Oldsmobile	-*	-*
53	34	Connie Saylor	AAG Racing	Buick	-*	-*
54	36	H. B. Bailey	Bailey Racing	Pontiac	-*	-*
55	40	Ben Hess	Hess Racing	Oldsmobile	-*	-*
56	50	Charlie Glotzbach	Dingman Brothers Racing	Pontiac	-*	-*
57	59	Mark Gibson	Gibson Racing	Pontiac	-*	-*
58	63	Jocko Maggiacomo	Linro Motorsports	Chevrolet	-*	-*
59	64	Mike Potter	Potter Racing	Chevrolet	-*	-*
60	70	J. D. McDuffie	McDuffie Racing	Pontiac	-*	-*
61	74	Randy LaJoie	Wawak Racing	Chevrolet	-*	-*
62	87	Randy Baker	Buck Baker Racing	Oldsmobile	-*	-*
63	93	Troy Beebe	Midgley Racing	Pontiac	-*	-*
64	95	Slick Johnson	Sadler Brothers Racing	Chevrolet	-*	-*
65	96	Dana Patten	Patten Racing	Buick	-*	-*
66	98	Brad Noffsinger (R)	Curb Racing	Buick	-*	-*
WD	77	Ken Ragan	Ragan Racing	Ford	-	-
Official first round qualifying results
Official starting lineup

== Race results ==
Fin	St	#	Driver	Team	Make	Laps	Led	Status	Pts	Winnings
1	3	27	Rusty Wallace	Blue Max Racing	Pontiac	334	35	running	180	$84,300
2	10	17	Darrell Waltrip	Hendrick Motorsports	Chevrolet	334	43	running	175	$54,525
3	16	15	Brett Bodine	Bud Moore Engineering	Ford	334	50	running	170	$43,350
4	2	9	Bill Elliott	Melling Racing	Ford	334	4	running	165	$35,900
5	9	44	Sterling Marlin	Hagan Racing	Oldsmobile	334	17	running	160	$28,200
6	32	8	Bobby Hillin Jr.	Stavola Brothers Racing	Buick	334	24	running	155	$20,740
7	7	25	Ken Schrader	Hendrick Motorsports	Chevrolet	334	1	running	151	$16,300
8	36	26	Ricky Rudd	King Racing	Buick	334	0	running	142	$13,825
9	4	6	Mark Martin	Roush Racing	Ford	334	0	running	138	$13,850
10	24	11	Terry Labonte	Junior Johnson & Associates	Chevrolet	334	1	running	139	$15,350
11	23	21	Kyle Petty	Wood Brothers Racing	Ford	333	0	running	130	$12,650
12	27	90	Benny Parsons	Donlavey Racing	Ford	332	13	running	132	$10,750
13	31	89	Jim Sauter	Mueller Brothers Racing	Pontiac	331	0	running	124	$4,650
14	34	47	Rob Moroso	Hendrick Motorsports	Chevrolet	331	0	running	121	$4,500
15	35	67	Brad Teague	Arrington Racing	Chevrolet	329	0	running	0	$6,850
16	39	57	Morgan Shepherd	Osterlund Racing	Buick	328	0	running	115	$4,100
17	11	3	Dale Earnhardt	Richard Childress Racing	Chevrolet	328	83	running	122	$24,300
18	28	75	Neil Bonnett	RahMoc Enterprises	Pontiac	327	0	running	109	$10,900
19	14	28	Davey Allison	Ranier-Lundy Racing	Ford	325	36	running	111	$24,000
20	42	31	Lee Faulk	Bob Clark Motorsports	Oldsmobile	324	0	running	103	$6,150
21	6	12	Mike Alexander	Stavola Brothers Racing	Buick	323	2	engine	105	$11,350
22	20	29	Cale Yarborough	Cale Yarborough Motorsports	Oldsmobile	323	0	running	97	$4,750
23	12	30	Michael Waltrip	Bahari Racing	Pontiac	278	0	crash	94	$6,250
24	8	33	Harry Gant	Mach 1 Racing	Chevrolet	250	3	engine	96	$6,250
25	30	4	Rick Wilson	Morgan–McClure Motorsports	Oldsmobile	236	0	engine	88	$3,450
26	25	71	Dave Marcis	Marcis Auto Racing	Chevrolet	207	0	crash	85	$5,100
27	18	55	Phil Parsons	Jackson Bros. Motorsports	Oldsmobile	207	0	crash	82	$4,900
28	1	7	Alan Kulwicki	AK Racing	Ford	193	0	crash	79	$24,650
29	17	88	Greg Sacks	Baker–Schiff Racing	Oldsmobile	191	0	crash	76	$4,425
30	38	97	Tommy Ellis	Winkle Motorsports	Buick	176	0	engine	0	$1,600
31	5	5	Geoff Bodine	Hendrick Motorsports	Chevrolet	129	21	engine	75	$8,990
32	15	68	Derrike Cope	Testa Racing	Ford	129	0	crank	67	$1,580
33	41	10	Ken Bouchard (R)	Whitcomb Racing	Ford	125	0	engine	64	$2,995
34	19	83	Lake Speed	Speed Racing	Oldsmobile	110	0	crash	61	$2,210
35	26	73	Joe Ruttman	Barkdoll Racing	Chevrolet	106	0	oil pressure	0	$1,550
36	21	14	A. J. Foyt	A. J. Foyt Racing	Oldsmobile	89	1	overheating	60	$2,240
37	22	1	Dale Jarrett	Ellington Racing	Buick	78	0	engine	52	$1,530
38	33	43	Richard Petty	Petty Enterprises	Pontiac	58	0	crash	49	$4,145
39	13	01	Mickey Gibbs	Gibbs Racing	Ford	41	0	transmission	46	$1,510
40	37	23	Eddie Bierschwale	B&B Racing	Oldsmobile	31	0	crash	43	$1,500
41	40	16	Larry Pearson	Pearson Racing	Chevrolet	9	0	oil pump	40	$1,500
42	29	52	Jimmy Means	Jimmy Means Racing	Pontiac	8	0	engine	37	$3,500
Failed to qualify (results unknown)
43		0	Delma Cowart	H. L. Waters Racing	Chevrolet					
44		00	Gary Brooks	Brooks Racing	Chevrolet					
45		2	Ernie Irvan (R)	U.S. Racing	Chevrolet					
46		03	Ronnie Silver	Bahari Racing	Pontiac					
47		03	Peter Sospenzo	Sospenzo Racing	Chevrolet					
48		19	Chad Little	Little Racing	Ford					
49		22	Rodney Combs	Richard Childress Racing	Chevrolet					
50		24	John McFadden	McFadden Racing	Chevrolet					
51		32	Philip Duffie	Duffie Racing	Buick					
52		32	Johnny Rutherford	Bob Clark Motorsports	Oldsmobile					
53		34	Connie Saylor	AAG Racing	Buick					
54		36	H. B. Bailey	Bailey Racing	Pontiac					
55		40	Ben Hess	Hess Racing	Oldsmobile					
56		50	Charlie Glotzbach	Dingman Brothers Racing	Pontiac					
57		59	Mark Gibson	Gibson Racing	Pontiac					
58		63	Jocko Maggiacomo	Linro Motorsports	Chevrolet					
59		64	Mike Potter	Potter Racing	Chevrolet					
60		70	J. D. McDuffie	McDuffie Racing	Pontiac					
61		74	Randy LaJoie	Wawak Racing	Chevrolet					
62		87	Randy Baker	Buck Baker Racing	Oldsmobile					
63		93	Troy Beebe	Midgley Racing	Pontiac					
64		95	Slick Johnson	Sadler Brothers Racing	Chevrolet					
65		96	Dana Patten	Patten Racing	Buick					
66		98	Brad Noffsinger (R)	Curb Racing	Buick					
WD		77	Ken Ragan	Ragan Racing	Ford					
Official race results

== Standings after the race ==
Drivers' Championship standings

	Pos	Driver	Points
	1	Bill Elliott	3,868
	2	Rusty Wallace	3,759 (-109)
	3	Dale Earnhardt	3,685 (-183)
	4	Terry Labonte	3,360 (–508)
1	5	Ken Schrader	3,310 (–558)
1	6	Darrell Waltrip	3,278 (–590)
2	7	Geoff Bodine	3,278 (–590)
	8	Sterling Marlin	3,168 (–700)
1	9	Davey Allison	3,074 (–794)
1	10	Phil Parsons	3,060 (–808)
Official driver's standings

- Note: Only the first 10 positions are included for the driver standings.

== Notes ==
Previous race: 1988 Goody's 500	NASCAR Winston Cup Series; 1988 season	Next race: 1988 Holly Farms 400
