= 1989 All Pro Auto Parts 500 =

25th race of the 1989 NASCAR Winston Cup Series

Race details
- Race 25 of 29 in the 1989 NASCAR Winston Cup Series
- The 1989 All Pro Auto Parts 500 program cover. Artwork by NASCAR artist Sam Bass.
- Date: October 8, 1989
- Official name: 30th Annual All Pro Auto Parts 500
- Location: Concord, North Carolina, Charlotte Motor Speedway
- Course: Permanent racing facility
- Course length: 1.5 miles (2.41 km)
- Distance: 334 laps, 501 mi (806.281 km)
- Scheduled distance: 334 laps, 501 mi (806.281 km)
- Average speed: 149.863 miles per hour (241.181 km/h)
- Attendance: 151,600

Pole position
Driver	Bill Elliott	Melling Racing
- Time: 31.020

Most laps led
Driver	Bill Elliott	Melling Racing
- Laps: 126

Winner
No. 25	Ken Schrader	Hendrick Motorsports

Television in the United States
- Network: TBS
- Announcers: Ken Squier, Johnny Hayes, Chris Economaki

Radio in the United States
- Radio: Performance Racing Network

The 1989 All Pro Auto Parts 500 was the 25th stock car race of the 1989 NASCAR Winston Cup Series season and the 30th iteration of the event. The race was held on Sunday, October 8, 1989, before an audience of 151,600 in Concord, North Carolina, at Charlotte Motor Speedway, a 1.5 miles (2.4 km) permanent quad-oval. The race took the scheduled 334 laps to complete. In the closing laps of the race, Hendrick Motorsports driver Ken Schrader would mount a late-race charge to the lead, passing for the lead with 15 laps left in the race to take his second career NASCAR Winston Cup Series victory and his only victory of the season. To fill out the top three, Jackson Bros. Motorsports driver Harry Gant and Roush Racing driver Mark Martin would finish second and third, respectively.

With an eighth-place finish from driver's championship contender Rusty Wallace and a last place finish from Dale Earnhardt, who finished the race 42nd after retiring from the race due to a broken camshaft, Wallace would manage to take over the driver's championship lead from Earnhardt with a 35-point lead.

== Background ==
The layout of Charlotte Motor Speedway, the venue where the race was held.

Charlotte Motor Speedway is a motorsports complex located in Concord, North Carolina, United States 13 miles from Charlotte, North Carolina. The complex features a 1.5 miles (2.4 km) quad oval track that hosts NASCAR racing including the prestigious Coca-Cola 600 on Memorial Day weekend and the NEXTEL All-Star Challenge, as well as the UAW-GM Quality 500. The speedway was built in 1959 by Bruton Smith and is considered the home track for NASCAR with many race teams located in the Charlotte area. The track is owned and operated by Speedway Motorsports Inc. (SMI) with Marcus G. Smith (son of Bruton Smith) as track president.

=== Entry list ===
- (R) denotes rookie driver.

#	Driver	Team	Make	Sponsor
2	Ernie Irvan	U.S. Racing	Pontiac	Kroger
02	Rich Bickle	Bickle Racing	Buick	Bickle Racing
3	Dale Earnhardt	Richard Childress Racing	Chevrolet	GM Goodwrench Service Plus
4	Rick Wilson	Morgan–McClure Motorsports	Oldsmobile	Kodak
5	Geoff Bodine	Hendrick Motorsports	Chevrolet	Levi Garrett
6	Mark Martin	Roush Racing	Ford	Stroh's Light
7	Alan Kulwicki	AK Racing	Ford	Zerex
8	Bobby Hillin Jr.	Stavola Brothers Racing	Buick	Miller High Life
9	Bill Elliott	Melling Racing	Ford	Coors Light
10	Derrike Cope	Whitcomb Racing	Pontiac	Purolator
11	Terry Labonte	Junior Johnson & Associates	Ford	Budweiser
14	A. J. Foyt	A. J. Foyt Racing	Oldsmobile	Copenhagen
15	Brett Bodine	Bud Moore Engineering	Ford	Motorcraft
16	Larry Pearson (R)	Pearson Racing	Buick	Chattanooga Chew
17	Darrell Waltrip	Hendrick Motorsports	Chevrolet	Tide
18	Brad Teague	TriStar Motorsports	Pontiac	Mello Yello
21	Tommy Ellis	Wood Brothers Racing	Ford	Citgo
23	Eddie Bierschwale	B&B Racing	Oldsmobile	Americraft
24	Robert Pressley	McFadden Racing	Chevrolet	Alliance Training Centers
25	Ken Schrader	Hendrick Motorsports	Chevrolet	Folgers
26	Ricky Rudd	King Racing	Buick	Quaker State
27	Rusty Wallace	Blue Max Racing	Pontiac	Kodiak
28	Davey Allison	Robert Yates Racing	Ford	Texaco, Havoline
29	Dale Jarrett	Cale Yarborough Motorsports	Pontiac	Hardee's
30	Michael Waltrip	Bahari Racing	Pontiac	Country Time
33	Harry Gant	Jackson Bros. Motorsports	Oldsmobile	Skoal Bandit
36	H. B. Bailey	Bailey Racing	Pontiac	Almeda Auto Parts
42	Kyle Petty	SABCO Racing	Pontiac	Peak Antifreeze
43	Richard Petty	Petty Enterprises	Pontiac	STP
44	Jim Sauter	Group 44	Pontiac	Group 44
47	Jack Pennington	Close Racing	Chevrolet	Sandlapper Fabrics
48	Greg Sacks	Winkle Motorsports	Pontiac	Dinner Bell Foods
49	James Hylton	Hylton Motorsports	Buick	Hylton Motorsports
50	Mickey Gibbs (R)	Dingman Brothers Racing	Pontiac	Valvoline
52	Jimmy Means	Jimmy Means Racing	Pontiac	Alka-Seltzer
53	Jerry O'Neil	Aroneck Racing	Oldsmobile	Aroneck Racing
55	Phil Parsons	Jackson Bros. Motorsports	Oldsmobile	Skoal, Crown Central Petroleum
57	Hut Stricklin (R)	Osterlund Racing	Pontiac	Heinz
66	Rick Mast (R)	Mach 1 Racing	Chevrolet	Winn-Dixie
70	J. D. McDuffie	McDuffie Racing	Pontiac	Rumple Furniture
71	Dave Marcis	Marcis Auto Racing	Chevrolet	Lifebuoy
75	Morgan Shepherd	RahMoc Enterprises	Pontiac	Valvoline
77	Ken Ragan	Ragan Racing	Ford	Jasper Engines & Transmissions
83	Lake Speed	Speed Racing	Oldsmobile	Bull's-Eye Barbecue Sauce
84	Dick Trickle (R)	Stavola Brothers Racing	Buick	Miller High Life
88	Jimmy Spencer (R)	Baker–Schiff Racing	Pontiac	Crisco
89	Rodney Combs	Mueller Brothers Racing	Pontiac	Evinrude Outboard Motors
90	Tracy Leslie	Donlavey Racing	Ford	Hawaiian Tropic
93	Charlie Baker	Salmon Racing	Buick	Salmon Racing
94	Sterling Marlin	Hagan Racing	Oldsmobile	Sunoco

== Qualifying ==
Qualifying was split into two rounds. The first round was held on Wednesday, October 4, at 2:00 PM EST. Each driver would have one lap to set a time. During the first round, the top 20 drivers in the round would be guaranteed a starting spot in the race. If a driver was not able to guarantee a spot in the first round, they had the option to scrub their time from the first round and try and run a faster lap time in a second round qualifying run, held on Thursday, October 5, at 2:00 PM EST. As with the first round, each driver would have one lap to set a time. For this specific race, positions 21-40 would be decided on time, and depending on who needed it, a select amount of positions were given to cars who had not otherwise qualified but were high enough in owner's points; up to two were given. If needed, a past champion who did not qualify on either time or provisionals could use a champion's provisional, adding one more spot to the field.

Bill Elliott, driving for Melling Racing, would win the pole, setting a time of 31.020 and an average speed of 174.081 miles per hour (280.156 km/h) in the first round.

Seven drivers would fail to qualify.

=== Full qualifying results ===
Pos.	#	Driver	Team	Make	Time	Speed
1	9	Bill Elliott	Melling Racing	Ford	31.020	174.081
2	25	Ken Schrader	Hendrick Motorsports	Chevrolet	31.202	173.066
3	6	Mark Martin	Roush Racing	Ford	31.257	172.761
4	17	Darrell Waltrip	Hendrick Motorsports	Chevrolet	31.270	172.689
5	28	Davey Allison	Robert Yates Racing	Ford	31.297	172.540
6	27	Rusty Wallace	Blue Max Racing	Pontiac	31.301	172.518
7	7	Alan Kulwicki	AK Racing	Ford	31.301	172.518
8	4	Rick Wilson	Morgan–McClure Motorsports	Oldsmobile	31.313	172.452
9	10	Derrike Cope	Whitcomb Racing	Pontiac	31.378	172.095
10	5	Geoff Bodine	Hendrick Motorsports	Chevrolet	31.430	171.810
11	94	Sterling Marlin	Hagan Racing	Oldsmobile	31.442	171.745
12	3	Dale Earnhardt	Richard Childress Racing	Chevrolet	31.447	171.717
13	15	Brett Bodine	Bud Moore Engineering	Ford	31.475	171.565
14	30	Michael Waltrip	Bahari Racing	Pontiac	31.516	171.342
15	33	Harry Gant	Jackson Bros. Motorsports	Oldsmobile	31.519	171.325
16	26	Ricky Rudd	King Racing	Buick	31.555	171.130
17	75	Morgan Shepherd	RahMoc Enterprises	Pontiac	31.563	171.086
18	11	Terry Labonte	Junior Johnson & Associates	Ford	31.582	170.983
19	21	Tommy Ellis	Wood Brothers Racing	Ford	31.639	170.675
20	83	Lake Speed	Speed Racing	Oldsmobile	31.640	170.670
Failed to lock in Round 1
21	18	Brad Teague	TriStar Motorsports	Pontiac	31.548	171.168
22	8	Bobby Hillin Jr.	Stavola Brothers Racing	Buick	31.562	171.092
23	57	Hut Stricklin (R)	Osterlund Racing	Pontiac	31.674	170.487
24	52	Jimmy Means	Jimmy Means Racing	Pontiac	31.732	170.175
25	2	Ernie Irvan	U.S. Racing	Pontiac	31.736	170.154
26	84	Dick Trickle (R)	Stavola Brothers Racing	Buick	31.750	170.079
27	43	Richard Petty	Petty Enterprises	Pontiac	31.758	170.036
28	16	Larry Pearson (R)	Pearson Racing	Buick	31.797	169.827
29	29	Dale Jarrett	Cale Yarborough Motorsports	Pontiac	31.811	169.753
30	66	Rick Mast (R)	Mach 1 Racing	Chevrolet	31.849	169.550
31	89	Rodney Combs	Mueller Brothers Racing	Pontiac	31.852	169.534
32	48	Greg Sacks	Winkle Motorsports	Pontiac	31.879	169.391
33	42	Kyle Petty	SABCO Racing	Pontiac	31.890	169.332
34	88	Jimmy Spencer (R)	Baker–Schiff Racing	Pontiac	31.897	169.295
35	50	Mickey Gibbs (R)	Dingman Brothers Racing	Pontiac	31.905	169.252
36	23	Eddie Bierschwale	B&B Racing	Oldsmobile	31.916	169.194
37	44	Jim Sauter	Group 44	Pontiac	31.919	169.178
38	77	Ken Ragan	Ragan Racing	Ford	31.929	169.125
39	53	Jerry O'Neil	Aroneck Racing	Oldsmobile	32.020	168.645
40	02	Rich Bickle	Bickle Racing	Buick	32.098	168.235
Provisionals
41	55	Phil Parsons	Jackson Bros. Motorsports	Oldsmobile	32.125	168.093
42	71	Dave Marcis	Marcis Auto Racing	Chevrolet	32.315	167.105
Failed to qualify
43	93	Charlie Baker	Salmon Racing	Buick	-*	-*
44	90	Tracy Leslie	Donlavey Racing	Ford	-*	-*
45	47	Jack Pennington	Close Racing	Chevrolet	-*	-*
46	24	Robert Pressley	McFadden Racing	Chevrolet	-*	-*
47	70	J. D. McDuffie	McDuffie Racing	Pontiac	-*	-*
48	36	H. B. Bailey	Bailey Racing	Pontiac	-*	-*
49	49	James Hylton	Hylton Motorsports	Buick	-*	-*
WD	14	A. J. Foyt (Note: Foyt would withdraw from the race after suffering severe bruises to his upper chest and neck due to crashing in a practice session on Tuesday, October 3.)	A. J. Foyt Racing	Oldsmobile	-*	-*
Official first round qualifying results
Official starting lineup

== Race results ==
Fin	St	#	Driver	Team	Make	Laps	Led	Status	Pts	Winnings
1	2	25	Ken Schrader	Hendrick Motorsports	Chevrolet	334	40	running	180	$91,700
2	15	33	Harry Gant	Jackson Bros. Motorsports	Oldsmobile	334	4	running	175	$50,375
3	3	6	Mark Martin	Roush Racing	Ford	334	107	running	170	$55,075
4	1	9	Bill Elliott	Melling Racing	Ford	334	126	running	170	$75,650
5	5	28	Davey Allison	Robert Yates Racing	Ford	334	1	running	160	$27,990
6	9	10	Derrike Cope	Whitcomb Racing	Pontiac	334	2	running	155	$16,775
7	11	94	Sterling Marlin	Hagan Racing	Oldsmobile	334	7	running	151	$15,750
8	6	27	Rusty Wallace	Blue Max Racing	Pontiac	333	45	running	147	$23,900
9	22	8	Bobby Hillin Jr.	Stavola Brothers Racing	Buick	332	0	running	138	$12,300
10	17	75	Morgan Shepherd	RahMoc Enterprises	Pontiac	332	0	running	134	$17,825
11	18	11	Terry Labonte	Junior Johnson & Associates	Ford	332	0	running	130	$13,450
12	13	15	Brett Bodine	Bud Moore Engineering	Ford	332	0	running	127	$9,770
13	30	66	Rick Mast (R)	Mach 1 Racing	Chevrolet	332	0	running	124	$6,070
14	4	17	Darrell Waltrip	Hendrick Motorsports	Chevrolet	331	0	out of gas	121	$16,000
15	28	16	Larry Pearson (R)	Pearson Racing	Buick	331	0	running	118	$7,350
16	34	88	Jimmy Spencer (R)	Baker–Schiff Racing	Pontiac	331	0	running	115	$8,160
17	14	30	Michael Waltrip	Bahari Racing	Pontiac	331	0	running	112	$7,760
18	19	21	Tommy Ellis	Wood Brothers Racing	Ford	331	0	running	0	$7,360
19	42	71	Dave Marcis	Marcis Auto Racing	Chevrolet	331	0	running	106	$9,617
20	41	55	Phil Parsons	Jackson Bros. Motorsports	Oldsmobile	331	0	running	103	$7,735
21	16	26	Ricky Rudd	King Racing	Buick	331	0	running	100	$10,480
22	10	5	Geoff Bodine	Hendrick Motorsports	Chevrolet	330	0	running	97	$10,480
23	23	57	Hut Stricklin (R)	Osterlund Racing	Pontiac	329	0	running	94	$3,830
24	29	29	Dale Jarrett	Cale Yarborough Motorsports	Pontiac	328	0	running	91	$5,450
25	36	23	Eddie Bierschwale	B&B Racing	Oldsmobile	324	0	running	88	$2,580
26	35	50	Mickey Gibbs (R)	Dingman Brothers Racing	Pontiac	323	0	running	85	$2,360
27	38	77	Ken Ragan	Ragan Racing	Ford	322	0	running	82	$2,240
28	7	7	Alan Kulwicki	AK Racing	Ford	278	0	engine	79	$5,970
29	33	42	Kyle Petty	SABCO Racing	Pontiac	269	0	engine	76	$2,000
30	26	84	Dick Trickle (R)	Stavola Brothers Racing	Buick	247	0	a frame	73	$4,610
31	21	18	Brad Teague	TriStar Motorsports	Pontiac	245	0	engine	0	$2,350
32	31	89	Rodney Combs	Mueller Brothers Racing	Pontiac	221	0	engine	67	$1,810
33	25	2	Ernie Irvan	U.S. Racing	Pontiac	184	0	crash	64	$2,455
34	27	43	Richard Petty	Petty Enterprises	Pontiac	142	0	engine	61	$2,410
35	32	48	Greg Sacks	Winkle Motorsports	Pontiac	128	2	transmission	63	$1,950
36	39	53	Jerry O'Neil	Aroneck Racing	Oldsmobile	85	0	crash	55	$1,740
37	24	52	Jimmy Means	Jimmy Means Racing	Pontiac	58	0	engine	52	$1,730
38	20	83	Lake Speed	Speed Racing	Oldsmobile	41	0	engine	49	$4,345
39	40	02	Rich Bickle	Bickle Racing	Buick	36	0	engine	46	$1,710
40	37	44	Jim Sauter	Group 44	Pontiac	32	0	engine	43	$1,700
41	8	4	Rick Wilson	Morgan–McClure Motorsports	Oldsmobile	25	0	engine	40	$4,800
42	12	3	Dale Earnhardt	Richard Childress Racing	Chevrolet	13	0	camshaft	37	$11,250
Failed to qualify
43		93	Charlie Baker	Salmon Racing	Buick					
44		90	Tracy Leslie	Donlavey Racing	Ford					
45		47	Jack Pennington	Close Racing	Chevrolet					
46		24	Robert Pressley	McFadden Racing	Chevrolet					
47		70	J. D. McDuffie	McDuffie Racing	Pontiac					
48		36	H. B. Bailey	Bailey Racing	Pontiac					
49		49	James Hylton	Hylton Motorsports	Buick					
WD		14	A. J. Foyt	A. J. Foyt Racing	Oldsmobile					
Official race results

== Standings after the race ==
Drivers' Championship standings

	Pos	Driver	Points
1	1	Rusty Wallace	3,612
1	2	Dale Earnhardt	3,577 (-35)
	3	Mark Martin	3,455 (-157)
	4	Darrell Waltrip	3,373 (–239)
1	5	Bill Elliott	3,244 (–368)
1	6	Ken Schrader	3,208 (–404)
2	7	Ricky Rudd	3,179 (–433)
	8	Davey Allison	3,152 (–460)
	9	Harry Gant	3,115 (–497)
	10	Terry Labonte	3,065 (–547)
Official driver's standings

- Note: Only the first 10 positions are included for the driver standings.

== Notes ==
Previous race: 1989 Goody's 500	NASCAR Winston Cup Series; 1989 season	Next race: 1989 Holly Farms 400
