= 1989 Heinz Southern 500 =

21st race of the 1989 NASCAR Winston Cup Series

Race details
- Race 21 of 29 in the 1989 NASCAR Winston Cup Series
- The 1989 Heinz Southern 500 program cover, featuring Darrell Waltrip.
- Date: September 3, 1989
- Official name: 40th Annual Heinz Southern 500
- Location: Darlington Raceway, Darlington, South Carolina
- Course: Permanent racing facility
- Course length: 1.366 miles (2.198 km)
- Distance: 367 laps, 501.322 mi (806.799 km)
- Average speed: 135.462 miles per hour (218.005 km/h)
- Attendance: 80,000

Pole position
Driver	Alan Kulwicki	AK Racing
- Time: 30.705

Most laps led
Driver	Dale Earnhardt	Richard Childress Racing
- Laps: 153

Winner
No. 3	Dale Earnhardt	Richard Childress Racing

Television in the United States
- Network: ESPN
- Announcers: Bob Jenkins, Ned Jarrett, Benny Parsons

Radio in the United States
- Radio: Motor Racing Network

The 1989 Heinz Southern 500 was the 21st stock car race of the 1989 NASCAR Winston Cup Series season and the 40th iteration of the event. The race was held on Sunday, September 3, 1989, before an audience of 80,000 in Darlington, South Carolina, at Darlington Raceway, a 1.366 miles (2.198 km) permanent egg-shaped oval racetrack. The race took the scheduled 367 laps to complete. At race's end, Richard Childress Racing driver Dale Earnhardt would dominate the late stages of the race, leading the final 63 laps of the race to take his 37th career NASCAR Winston Cup Series victory and his third victory of the season. To fill out the top three, Roush Racing driver Mark Martin and King Racing driver Ricky Rudd would finish second and third, respectively.

== Background ==
The layout of Darlington Raceway, the venue where the race was held.

Darlington Raceway is a race track built for NASCAR racing located near Darlington, South Carolina. It is nicknamed "The Lady in Black" and "The Track Too Tough to Tame" by many NASCAR fans and drivers and advertised as "A NASCAR Tradition." It is of a unique, somewhat egg-shaped design, an oval with the ends of very different configurations, a condition which supposedly arose from the proximity of one end of the track to a minnow pond the owner refused to relocate. This situation makes it very challenging for the crews to set up their cars' handling in a way that is effective at both ends.

=== Entry list ===
- (R) denotes rookie driver.

#	Driver	Team	Make	Sponsor
2	Ernie Irvan	U.S. Racing	Pontiac	Kroger
3	Dale Earnhardt	Richard Childress Racing	Chevrolet	GM Goodwrench Service Plus
4	Rick Wilson	Morgan–McClure Motorsports	Oldsmobile	Kodak
5	Geoff Bodine	Hendrick Motorsports	Chevrolet	Levi Garrett
6	Mark Martin	Roush Racing	Ford	Stroh's Light
7	Alan Kulwicki	AK Racing	Ford	Zerex
8	Bobby Hillin Jr.	Stavola Brothers Racing	Buick	Miller High Life
9	Bill Elliott	Melling Racing	Ford	Coors Light
10	Derrike Cope	Whitcomb Racing	Pontiac	Purolator
11	Terry Labonte	Junior Johnson & Associates	Ford	Budweiser
15	Brett Bodine	Bud Moore Engineering	Ford	Motorcraft
16	Larry Pearson (R)	Pearson Racing	Buick	Chattanooga Chew
17	Darrell Waltrip	Hendrick Motorsports	Chevrolet	Tide
21	Neil Bonnett	Wood Brothers Racing	Ford	Citgo
24	John McFadden	McFadden Racing	Chevrolet	Alliance Training Centers
25	Ken Schrader	Hendrick Motorsports	Chevrolet	Folgers
26	Ricky Rudd	King Racing	Buick	Quaker State
27	Rusty Wallace	Blue Max Racing	Pontiac	Kodiak
28	Davey Allison	Robert Yates Racing	Ford	Texaco, Havoline
29	Dale Jarrett	Cale Yarborough Motorsports	Pontiac	Hardee's
30	Michael Waltrip	Bahari Racing	Pontiac	Country Time
33	Harry Gant	Jackson Bros. Motorsports	Oldsmobile	Skoal Bandit
36	H. B. Bailey	Bailey Racing	Pontiac	Almeda Auto Parts
42	Kyle Petty	SABCO Racing	Pontiac	Peak Antifreeze
43	Richard Petty	Petty Enterprises	Pontiac	STP
48	Greg Sacks	Winkle Motorsports	Pontiac	Dinner Bell Foods
49	James Hylton	Hylton Motorsports	Buick	Hylton Motorsports
52	Jimmy Means	Jimmy Means Racing	Pontiac	Alka-Seltzer
55	Phil Parsons	Jackson Bros. Motorsports	Oldsmobile	Skoal, Crown Central Petroleum
57	Hut Stricklin (R)	Osterlund Racing	Pontiac	Heinz
62	Joe Ruttman	Douglas Smith Racing	Oldsmobile	Baja Boats
70	J. D. McDuffie	McDuffie Racing	Pontiac	Rumple Furniture
71	Dave Marcis	Marcis Auto Racing	Chevrolet	Lifebuoy
75	Morgan Shepherd	RahMoc Enterprises	Pontiac	Valvoline
81	Mike Potter	Welch Racing	Ford	O. C. Welch Ford
83	Rodney Combs	Speed Racing	Oldsmobile	Bull's-Eye Barbecue Sauce
84	Dick Trickle (R)	Stavola Brothers Racing	Buick	Miller High Life
88	Jimmy Spencer (R)	Baker–Schiff Racing	Pontiac	Crisco
94	Sterling Marlin	Hagan Racing	Oldsmobile	Sunoco

== Qualifying ==
Qualifying was split into two rounds. The first round was held on Thursday, August 31, at 3:00 PM EST. Each driver would have one lap to set a time. During the first round, the top 20 drivers in the round would be guaranteed a starting spot in the race. If a driver was not able to guarantee a spot in the first round, they had the option to scrub their time from the first round and try and run a faster lap time in a second round qualifying run, held on Friday, September 1, at 2:00 PM EST. As with the first round, each driver would have one lap to set a time. For this specific race, positions 21-40 would be decided on time and depending on who needed it, a select amount of positions were given to cars who had not otherwise qualified on time but were high enough in owner's points; up to two provisionals were given.

Alan Kulwicki, driving for his own AK Racing team, would win the pole, setting a time of 30.705 and an average speed of 160.156 miles per hour (257.746 km/h) in the first round.

No drivers would fail to qualify.

=== Full qualifying results ===
Pos.	#	Driver	Team	Make	Time	Speed
1	7	Alan Kulwicki	AK Racing	Ford	30.705	160.156
2	25	Ken Schrader	Hendrick Motorsports	Chevrolet	30.731	160.021
3	6	Mark Martin	Roush Racing	Ford	30.781	159.761
4	9	Bill Elliott	Melling Racing	Ford	30.797	159.678
5	27	Rusty Wallace	Blue Max Racing	Pontiac	30.799	159.668
6	33	Harry Gant	Jackson Bros. Motorsports	Oldsmobile	30.870	159.300
7	5	Geoff Bodine	Hendrick Motorsports	Chevrolet	30.874	159.280
8	26	Ricky Rudd	King Racing	Buick	31.005	158.607
9	17	Darrell Waltrip	Hendrick Motorsports	Chevrolet	31.030	158.479
10	3	Dale Earnhardt	Richard Childress Racing	Chevrolet	31.109	158.076
11	15	Brett Bodine	Bud Moore Engineering	Ford	31.128	157.980
12	10	Derrike Cope	Whitcomb Racing	Pontiac	31.266	157.283
13	4	Rick Wilson	Morgan–McClure Motorsports	Oldsmobile	31.272	157.252
14	84	Dick Trickle (R)	Stavola Brothers Racing	Buick	31.291	157.157
15	30	Michael Waltrip	Bahari Racing	Pontiac	31.299	157.117
16	94	Sterling Marlin	Hagan Racing	Oldsmobile	31.300	157.112
17	16	Larry Pearson (R)	Pearson Racing	Buick	31.310	157.062
18	8	Bobby Hillin Jr.	Stavola Brothers Racing	Buick	31.332	156.951
19	21	Neil Bonnett	Wood Brothers Racing	Ford	31.374	156.741
20	2	Ernie Irvan	U.S. Racing	Pontiac	31.394	156.640
Failed to lock in Round 1
21	83	Rodney Combs	Speed Racing	Oldsmobile	31.374	156.741
22	48	Greg Sacks	Winkle Motorsports	Pontiac	31.408	156.572
23	42	Kyle Petty	SABCO Racing	Pontiac	31.438	156.422
24	75	Morgan Shepherd	RahMoc Enterprises	Pontiac	31.452	156.353
25	28	Davey Allison	Robert Yates Racing	Ford	31.462	156.303
26	29	Dale Jarrett	Cale Yarborough Motorsports	Pontiac	31.486	156.184
27	88	Jimmy Spencer (R)	Baker–Schiff Racing	Pontiac	31.497	156.129
28	11	Terry Labonte	Junior Johnson & Associates	Ford	31.518	156.025
29	57	Hut Stricklin (R)	Osterlund Racing	Pontiac	31.654	155.355
30	71	Dave Marcis	Marcis Auto Racing	Chevrolet	31.798	154.651
31	55	Phil Parsons	Jackson Bros. Motorsports	Oldsmobile	31.835	154.471
32	62	Joe Ruttman	Douglas Smith Racing	Oldsmobile	32.067	153.354
33	43	Richard Petty	Petty Enterprises	Pontiac	32.108	153.158
34	52	Jimmy Means	Jimmy Means Racing	Pontiac	32.275	152.366
35	36	H. B. Bailey	Bailey Racing	Pontiac	32.514	151.246
36	70	J. D. McDuffie	McDuffie Racing	Pontiac	32.932	149.326
37	24	John McFadden	McFadden Racing	Chevrolet	32.934	149.317
38	81	Mike Potter	Welch Racing	Ford	34.029	144.512
39	49	James Hylton	Hylton Motorsports	Buick	34.688	141.767
Official first round qualifying results
Official starting lineup

== Race results ==
Fin	St	#	Driver	Team	Make	Laps	Led	Status	Pts	Winnings
1	10	3	Dale Earnhardt	Richard Childress Racing	Chevrolet	367	153	running	185	$71,150
2	3	6	Mark Martin	Roush Racing	Ford	367	0	running	170	$37,550
3	8	26	Ricky Rudd	King Racing	Buick	367	0	running	165	$26,865
4	5	27	Rusty Wallace	Blue Max Racing	Pontiac	367	94	running	165	$24,330
5	2	25	Ken Schrader	Hendrick Motorsports	Chevrolet	367	5	running	160	$20,390
6	6	33	Harry Gant	Jackson Bros. Motorsports	Oldsmobile	367	83	running	155	$17,000
7	4	9	Bill Elliott	Melling Racing	Ford	367	4	running	151	$18,430
8	18	8	Bobby Hillin Jr.	Stavola Brothers Racing	Buick	367	0	running	142	$11,195
9	24	75	Morgan Shepherd	RahMoc Enterprises	Pontiac	366	0	running	138	$16,287
10	16	94	Sterling Marlin	Hagan Racing	Oldsmobile	365	1	running	139	$12,430
11	13	4	Rick Wilson	Morgan–McClure Motorsports	Oldsmobile	365	0	running	130	$9,385
12	7	5	Geoff Bodine	Hendrick Motorsports	Chevrolet	365	0	running	127	$12,120
13	15	30	Michael Waltrip	Bahari Racing	Pontiac	364	0	running	124	$8,960
14	23	42	Kyle Petty	SABCO Racing	Pontiac	364	0	running	121	$4,840
15	19	21	Neil Bonnett	Wood Brothers Racing	Ford	363	1	running	123	$9,140
16	11	15	Brett Bodine	Bud Moore Engineering	Ford	363	0	running	115	$8,300
17	14	84	Dick Trickle (R)	Stavola Brothers Racing	Buick	363	0	running	112	$8,690
18	25	28	Davey Allison	Robert Yates Racing	Ford	362	0	running	109	$12,595
19	29	57	Hut Stricklin (R)	Osterlund Racing	Pontiac	362	0	running	106	$6,095
20	26	29	Dale Jarrett	Cale Yarborough Motorsports	Pontiac	361	0	running	103	$7,810
21	31	55	Phil Parsons	Jackson Bros. Motorsports	Oldsmobile	360	0	running	100	$6,645
22	9	17	Darrell Waltrip	Hendrick Motorsports	Chevrolet	359	3	running	102	$112,890
23	21	83	Rodney Combs	Speed Racing	Oldsmobile	351	0	running	0	$6,895
24	20	2	Ernie Irvan	U.S. Racing	Pontiac	325	0	running	91	$4,175
25	12	10	Derrike Cope	Whitcomb Racing	Pontiac	320	0	running	88	$4,105
26	34	52	Jimmy Means	Jimmy Means Racing	Pontiac	309	0	engine	85	$3,090
27	35	36	H. B. Bailey	Bailey Racing	Pontiac	295	0	running	82	$3,000
28	30	71	Dave Marcis	Marcis Auto Racing	Chevrolet	286	6	crash	84	$5,605
29	17	16	Larry Pearson (R)	Pearson Racing	Buick	225	0	engine	76	$3,490
30	32	62	Joe Ruttman	Douglas Smith Racing	Oldsmobile	224	0	water pump	73	$2,810
31	37	24	John McFadden	McFadden Racing	Chevrolet	213	0	vibration	70	$2,615
32	1	7	Alan Kulwicki	AK Racing	Ford	184	17	engine	72	$8,005
33	28	11	Terry Labonte	Junior Johnson & Associates	Ford	167	0	engine	64	$9,500
34	38	81	Mike Potter	Welch Racing	Ford	137	0	header	61	$2,455
35	33	43	Richard Petty	Petty Enterprises	Pontiac	91	0	engine	58	$2,995
36	36	70	J. D. McDuffie	McDuffie Racing	Pontiac	90	0	engine	55	$2,350
37	27	88	Jimmy Spencer (R)	Baker–Schiff Racing	Pontiac	80	0	crash	52	$4,870
38	22	48	Greg Sacks	Winkle Motorsports	Pontiac	21	0	crash	49	$2,215
39	39	49	James Hylton	Hylton Motorsports	Buick	13	0	engine	46	$2,100
Official race results

== Standings after the race ==
Drivers' Championship standings

	Pos	Driver	Points
	1	Dale Earnhardt	3,037
	2	Rusty Wallace	2,964 (-73)
	3	Mark Martin	2,904 (-133)
	4	Darrell Waltrip	2,813 (–224)
1	5	Bill Elliott	2,682 (–355)
1	6	Davey Allison	2,662 (–375)
1	7	Ken Schrader	2,633 (–404)
1	8	Ricky Rudd	2,622 (–415)
2	9	Harry Gant	2,566 (–471)
	10	Geoff Bodine	2,561 (–476)
Official driver's standings

- Note: Only the first 10 positions are included for the driver standings.

Previous race: 1989 Busch 500	NASCAR Winston Cup Series; 1989 season	Next race: 1989 Miller High Life 400 (Richmond)
