= Terry Byers =

Australian racing driver (born 1950)

- Born: January 23, 1950 (age 76); Wollongong, New South Wales, Australia

NASCAR Cup Series career
- 5 races run over 4 years
- Best finish: 49th (1989)
- First race: 1989 Coca-Cola 600 (Charlotte)
- Last race: 1990 Pepsi 400 (Daytona)
Wins	Top tens	Poles
0	0	0
- Statistics up to date as of November 19, 2024.

Terry Byers (born January 23, 1950) is an Australian former professional stock car racing driver who competed in five races in the NASCAR Winston Cup Series from 1989 to 1990, with a best finish of nineteenth at Pocono Raceway in 1989.

Byers also competed in the non-championship Goodyear NASCAR 500 at the Calder Park Thunderdome in 1988, where he finished in 25th due to a crash. Later in the year, he competed in the NASCAR Christmas 500 at the track, finishing sixteenth. He returned for the final running of the event in 1990, finishing tenth in the rain-shortened NASCAR Christmas 400. Byers intended to compete for Rookie of the Year in the Winston Cup Series in 1995, but only wound up attempting two races. He made his final Winston Cup attempt in 1996.

== Motorsports results ==
=== NASCAR ===
(key) (Bold - Pole position awarded by qualifying time. Italics - Pole position earned by points standings or practice time. * – Most laps led.)

==== Winston Cup Series ====
NASCAR Winston Cup Series results
Year	Team	No.	Make	1	2	3	4	5	6	7	8	9	10	11	12	13	14	15	16	17	18	19	20	21	22	23	24	25	26	27	28	29	30	31	NWCC	Pts	Ref
1989	Byers Racing	06	Chevy	DAY	CAR	ATL	RCH	DAR	BRI	NWS	MAR	TAL	CLT; 21	DOV	SON	POC; 19	MCH	DAY; DNQ	POC; 21																49th	306	
1989	Byers Racing	06	Buick																	TAL; DNQ	GLN	MCH	BRI	DAR	RCH	DOV	MAR	CLT	NWS	CAR	PHO	ATL			49th	306	
1990	Byers Racing	06	Pontiac	DAY	RCH	CAR	ATL	DAR	BRI	NWS	MAR	TAL	CLT; 40	DOV	SON	POC	MCH	DAY; 40	POC	TAL	GLN	MCH	BRI	DAR	RCH	DOV	MAR	NWS	CLT	CAR	PHO	ATL			103rd	43	
1995	Byers Racing	82	Ford	DAY; DNQ	CAR	RCH	ATL	DAR	BRI	NWS	MAR	TAL	SON	CLT	DOV	POC	MCH	DAY	NHA	POC; DNQ	TAL	IND	GLN	MCH	BRI	DAR	RCH	DOV	MAR	NWS	CLT	CAR	PHO	ATL	N/A	0	
1996	Byers Racing	82	Chevy	DAY	CAR	RCH	ATL	DAR	BRI	NWS	MAR	TAL	SON	CLT	DOV	POC	MCH	DAY	NHA	POC	TAL	IND	GLN	MCH	BRI	DAR	RCH	DOV	MAR	NWS	CLT	CAR; DNQ	PHO	ATL	N/A	0	

===== Daytona 500 =====
Year	Team	Manufacturer	Start	Finish
1995	Byers Racing	Ford	DNQ	
