= Peter Sospenzo =

American racing driver and crew chief

- Born: Peter J. Sospenzo; December 23, 1956 (age 69); Brooklyn, New York, U.S.

NASCAR O'Reilly Auto Parts Series career
- 1 race run over 1 year
- Best finish: 108th (1991)
- First race: 1991 Autolite 200 (Richmond)
Wins	Top tens	Poles
0	0	0

Peter J. Sospenzo (born December 23, 1956) is an American professional stock car racing driver and crew chief who works for Spire Motorsports on their Next Gen car implementation. He previously competed in the NASCAR Busch Grand National Series as a driver.

== Racing career ==
A former NASCAR Busch Series and ARCA Permatex SuperCar Series driver, Sospenzo began working as a crew chief in 1994 with Rich Bickle. From 1994 to 1997, he worked with Phil Parsons, Joe Ruttman, Lake Speed, Loy Allen Jr., Mike Wallace, and Gary Bradberry. He later joined Penske-Kranefuss Racing, taking over as Jeremy Mayfield's crew chief during the 1999 season after Paul Andrews was fired. In 2000, Sospenzo and Mayfield won two races, though the former was also subject to penalties during the year for various infractions. In May, he was fined following Mayfield's win at California Speedway for a roof height violation, followed by a four-race suspension for using illegal fuel additives during the Talladega Superspeedway race in April.

Sospenzo joined Hendrick Motorsports' No. 25, driven by Joe Nemechek late in the 2002 season. The following year, the two won at Richmond International Speedway; Nemechek rebounded from a pit miscommunication that dropped him to 25th by taking the lead late in the race and was declared the winner when the event was shortened by rain. With the Hendrick organization, Sospenzo later worked with Brian Vickers and Terry Labonte. He reunited with Nemechek at Ginn Racing in 2007, but was released when the team merged with Dale Earnhardt, Inc. in July.

After Ginn, Sospenzo joined Michael Waltrip Racing and Michael McDowell's No. 00 car, which was followed by leading Kevin Conway and David Gilliland at Front Row Motorsports. In 2014, he became Dave Blaney's crew chief at Randy Humphrey Racing. A stint at Team Xtreme Racing in 2015 saw his final race as a Cup crew chief—the 2015 Daytona 500 with Reed Sorenson—until 2018.

In 2018, Sospenzo joined Premium Motorsports; in addition to overseeing the team's No. 7, he led Stefan Parsons' NASCAR Camping World Truck Series debut with the team at Bristol Motor Speedway. The following year, he became the crew chief of Spire Motorsports' No. 77. In July, he won the rain-shortened Coke Zero Sugar 400 at Daytona with driver Justin Haley. In addition to being Haley and Spire's first Cup victories, it was Sospenzo's first since the coincidentally also-rain-shortened 2003 Richmond victory with Nemechek.

In 2021, Sospenzo was replaced by Kevin Bellicourt as the crew chief of the Spire Motorsports No. 77 car, and he became the crew chief for Rick Ware Racing's No. 52 car driven by Josh Bilicki. After the first ten races of the season, Sospenzo left RWR to return to Spire where he was tasked with helping the team prepare their Next Gen cars for 2022. He also served as the interim crew chief for the No. 77 at Sonoma and again at Bristol in September when Bellicourt was suspended.

== Motorsports career results ==
=== NASCAR ===
(key) (Bold – Pole position awarded by qualifying time. Italics – Pole position earned by points standings or practice time. * – Most laps led.)

==== Busch Series ====
NASCAR Busch Series results
Year	Team	No.	Make	1	2	3	4	5	6	7	8	9	10	11	12	13	14	15	16	17	18	19	20	21	22	23	24	25	26	27	28	29	30	31	NBSC	Pts	Ref
1991	Sospenzo Racing	03	Chevy	DAY	RCH	CAR	MAR	VOL	HCY	DAR	BRI	LAN	SBO	NZH	CLT	DOV	ROU	HCY	MYB	GLN	OXF	NHA; DNQ	SBO	DUB; DNQ	IRP	ROU; DNQ	BRI	DAR	RCH; 32	DOV	CLT; DNQ	NHA	CAR	MAR	108th	67	

==== Busch North Series ====
NASCAR Busch North Series results
Year	Team	No.	Make	1	2	3	4	5	6	7	8	9	10	11	12	13	14	15	16	17	18	19	20	21	22	23	24	NBNSC	Pts	Ref
1991	Sospenzo Racing	03	Chevy	DAY	RCH	CAR	NHA	OXF	NZH	MND	OXF	TMP	HOL	JEN	EPP	STA	OXF	NHA	FLE	OXF	TMP	NHA; 19	RPS	TMP	DOV	EPP	NHA	57th	106	

=== ARCA Permatex SuperCar Series ===
(key) (Bold – Pole position awarded by qualifying time. Italics – Pole position earned by points standings or practice time. * – Most laps led.)

ARCA Permatex SuperCar Series results
Year	Team	No.	Make	1	2	3	4	5	6	7	8	9	10	11	12	13	14	15	16	17	18	19	ASCSC	Pts	Ref
1987	Dale Earnhardt, Inc.	86	Chevy	DAY	ATL	TAL	DEL	ACS	TOL	ROC	POC	FRS	KIL	TAL	FRS	ISF	INF	DSF	SLM	ATL; 36			116th	-	
1988	Sospenzo Racing	03	Buick	DAY	ATL	TAL	FRS	PCS	ROC	POC	WIN	KIL	ACS	SLM	POC	TAL	DEL	FRS	ISF	DSF	SLM	ATL; 9	126th	-	
1989	Sospenzo Racing	03	Buick	DAY; DNQ	ATL; 33	KIL	TAL	FRS	POC	KIL	HAG	POC											82nd	-	
1989	Sospenzo Racing	03	Chevy										TAL; DNQ	DEL	FRS	ISF	TOL	DSF	SLM				82nd	-	
1989	Sospenzo Racing	08	Buick																	ATL; 38			82nd	-	
1990	Sospenzo Racing	08	Buick	DAY	ATL; 21	KIL	TAL; DNQ	FRS	POC	KIL	TOL	HAG	POC	TAL	MCH	ISF	TOL	DSF	WIN	DEL			84th	-	
1990	Sospenzo Racing	08	Chevy																		ATL; 30		84th	-	
