= Phil Barkdoll =

American racecar driver (1937–2025)

- Born: September 9, 1937; Garrison, Iowa, U.S.
- Died: September 2, 2025 (aged 87); Vinton, Iowa, U.S.

NASCAR Cup Series career
- 23 races run over 9 years
- Best finish: 45th (1989)
- First race: 1984 Winston 500 (Talladega)
- Last race: 1992 Pepsi 400 (Daytona)
Wins	Top tens	Poles
0	0	0
- Statistics up to date as of March 12, 2012.

Phillip Lyle Barkdoll (September 9, 1937 – September 2, 2025) was an American NASCAR owner/driver from Garrison, Iowa, who only ran at two tracks in his entire Winston Cup career, racing at Daytona International Speedway and Talladega Superspeedway, although he also made a few attempts at Charlotte Motor Speedway.

== NASCAR career ==
Barkdoll campaigned part-time on the NASCAR circuit from 1984 to 1997, relying on small sponsorships and free advertising to help pay for his racing. He has provided a ride for other drivers at other tracks. Barkdoll began racing in 1981, with his first race coming in the 1984 Winston 500. After starting sixteenth, Barkdoll finished 35th after losing an engine on the 60th lap. 1985 saw Barkdoll compete for his mother-in-law's race team, Helen Rae Motorsports, driving the No. 00 at both Talladega races, finishing 35th and 22nd, respectively.

In 1987, Barkdoll had a spectacular accident heading into the tri-oval on the fourth lap during one of the Twin 125 mile qualifying races for the Daytona 500. He got airborne, flipped across the track and into the fence before sliding to a halt on his wheels. In 1988, Barkdoll was involved in another spectacular accident at Daytona, this time in the Daytona 500 itself. Coming of turn four on the 106th circuit, he slightly tapped Richard Petty, which sent Petty tumbling down the track before being t-boned by Brett Bodine.

On the 144th lap of the 1989 Daytona 500, Barkdoll took yet another wild ride. Barkdoll's Oldsmobile slid into the dirt embankment on the backstretch, and ended up on its side.

In 1990, Barkdoll campaigned a second car which was driven by Stan Barrett (Stanton Barrett's father) for the Daytona 500 and Phil Parsons during the Winston 500 and the Winston. He competed in the NASCAR Christmas 400 at the Calder Park Thunderdome in Australia, finishing eighth.

Barkdoll had even more trouble at the 1991 Daytona 500, and he went for a spin off turn four and the car lifted off the ground and blew out the windshield. This time the car landed on all four wheels and Barkdoll finished 20th. Barkdoll's final Winston Cup points paying start came in 1992 in the Pepsi 400 at Daytona. He finished 28th, four laps off the pace.

In 1993, Barkdoll was diagnosed with cancer, and Stanley Smith drove his car in the Twin 125's at Daytona. Smith was eliminated in a first lap wreck with Steve Kinser, and did not make the field. Barkdoll would return from his absence in 1994, but would miss the 500. It was Barkdoll's first DNQ in the 500 since 1987. In 1995, Barkdoll had a strong run in the second qualifier in his No. 73 Ford, but it ended in a crash coming off turn two, resulting in another DNQ.

In 1997, Barkdoll returned to the 500 after skipping the race in 1996. He would qualify 25th fastest on pole qualifying day in his No. 73 Chevrolet. Barkdoll's speed was fast enough to earn the 38th starting position after he failed to finish in the top-fifteen of his Twin 125. However, SABCO Racing's No. 42 Bellsouth Chevrolet for Joe Nemechek failed to qualify for the race. SABCO team owner Felix Sabates worked a deal with Barkdoll and bought the 73 car for Nemechek, leaving Barkdoll on the sidelines, but richer as a result. Nemechek would crash late, finishing 27th. Barkdoll would attempt to qualify for Talladega later in the season, but would miss the field.

== Car owner ==
Barkdoll owned the car that he drove in most of the Winston Cup races that he competed in during his career (with the exception of the two races in 1985 that his car was owned by his mother-in-law, Helen Rae Smith, who also sponsored several cars that were known as the Helen Rae Special. In addition, he fielded cars for drivers such as Ken Bouchard, Jim Sauter, Mike Wallace, Joe Ruttman and Morgan Shepherd.

In 1998, Barkdoll fielded a car in the Daytona 500 supported by longtime sponsor X-1R Performance. Barkdoll would practice and qualify the car, but he would place Mike Wallace behind the wheel prior to the 125s. Wallace raced into the 500 and finished 23rd, one lap down. The following season, Barkdoll fielded his No. 73 with sponsorship from Three Stooges Beer at the Daytona 500 for the final time, driver Ken Bouchard was unable to qualify for the race.

== Death ==
Barkdoll died at his home in Vinton, Iowa, on September 2, 2025, one week before his 88th birthday.

== Motorsports career results ==
=== NASCAR ===
(key) (Bold – Pole position awarded by qualifying time. Italics – Pole position earned by points standings or practice time. * – Most laps led.)

==== Winston Cup Series ====
NASCAR Winston Cup Series results
Year	Team	No.	Make	1	2	3	4	5	6	7	8	9	10	11	12	13	14	15	16	17	18	19	20	21	22	23	24	25	26	27	28	29	30	31	32	NWCC	Pts	Ref
1984	Barkdoll Racing	38	Chevy	DAY	RCH	CAR	ATL	BRI	NWS	DAR	MAR	TAL; 35	NSV	DOV	CLT	RSD	POC	MCH	DAY	NSV	POC	TAL; 25	MCH	BRI	DAR	RCH	DOV	MAR	CLT	NWS	CAR	ATL	RSD			65th	146	
1985	Helen Rae Motorsports	00	Chevy	DAY	RCH	CAR	ATL	BRI	DAR	NWS	MAR	TAL; 35	DOV	CLT	RSD	POC	MCH	DAY	POC	TAL; 22	MCH	BRI	DAR	RCH	DOV	MAR	NWS	CLT	CAR	ATL	RSD					68th	155	
1986	Barkdoll Racing	73	Ford	DAY; DNQ	RCH	CAR	ATL	BRI	DAR	NWS	MAR	TAL; 28	DOV	CLT	RSD	POC	MCH	DAY; DNQ	POC	TAL; 33	GLN	MCH	BRI	DAR	RCH	DOV	MAR	NWS	CLT	CAR	ATL	RSD				103rd	84	
1987	Barkdoll Racing	73	Olds	DAY; DNQ	CAR	RCH	ATL	DAR	NWS	BRI	MAR																									100th	58	
1987	Barkdoll Racing	73	Chevy									TAL; 35	CLT	DOV	POC	RSD	MCH	DAY; DNQ	POC	TAL	GLN	MCH	BRI	DAR	RCH	DOV	MAR	NWS	CLT; DNQ	CAR	RSD	ATL				100th	58	
1988	Barkdoll Racing	73	Ford	DAY; 36	RCH	CAR	ATL	DAR	BRI	NWS	MAR							DAY; DNQ	POC																	52nd	210	
1988	Barkdoll Racing	73	Chevy									TAL; 31	CLT	DOV	RSD	POC	MCH			TAL; 26	GLN	MCH	BRI	DAR	RCH	DOV	MAR	CLT	NWS	CAR	PHO	ATL				52nd	210	
1989	Barkdoll Racing	73	Olds	DAY; 31	CAR	ATL	RCH	DAR	BRI	NWS	MAR	TAL; 32	CLT; DNQ	DOV	SON	POC	MCH	DAY; 15	POC	TAL; 15	GLN	MCH	BRI	DAR	RCH	DOV	MAR	CLT	NWS	CAR	PHO	ATL				45th	378	
1990	Barkdoll Racing	73	Olds	DAY; 39	RCH	CAR	ATL	DAR	BRI	NWS	MAR	TAL; 30	CLT	DOV	SON	POC	MCH	DAY; 31	POC	TAL	GLN	MCH	BRI	DAR	RCH	DOV	MAR	NWS	CLT	CAR	PHO	ATL				63rd	189	
1991	Barkdoll Racing	73	Olds	DAY; 20	RCH	CAR	ATL	DAR	BRI	NWS	MAR	TAL; 19	CLT	DOV	SON	POC	MCH	DAY; 35	POC	TAL; 22	GLN	MCH	BRI	DAR	RCH	DOV	MAR	NWS	CLT	CAR	PHO	ATL				46th	364	
1992	Barkdoll Racing	73	Olds	DAY; 17	CAR	RCH	ATL	DAR	BRI	NWS	MAR	TAL; DNQ	CLT; DNQ	DOV	SON	POC	MCH	DAY; 28	POC	TAL	GLN	MCH	BRI	DAR	RCH	DOV	MAR	NWS	CLT	CAR	PHO	ATL				55th	191	
1993	Barkdoll Racing	73	Olds	DAY	CAR	RCH	ATL	DAR	BRI	NWS	MAR	TAL; DNQ	SON	CLT	DOV	POC	MCH																			NA	-	
1993	Barkdoll Racing	73	Chevy															DAY; DNQ	NHA	POC	TAL	GLN	MCH	BRI	DAR	RCH	DOV	MAR	NWS	CLT	CAR	PHO	ATL			NA	-	
1994	Barkdoll Racing	73	Chevy	DAY; DNQ	CAR	RCH	ATL	DAR	BRI	NWS	MAR	TAL	SON	CLT	DOV	POC	MCH	DAY	NHA	POC	TAL	IND	GLN	MCH	BRI	DAR	RCH	DOV	MAR	NWS	CLT	CAR	PHO	ATL		NA	-	
1995	Barkdoll Racing	73	Ford	DAY; DNQ	CAR	RCH	ATL	DAR	BRI	NWS	MAR	TAL	SON	CLT	DOV	POC	MCH	DAY	NHA	POC	TAL	IND	GLN	MCH	BRI	DAR	RCH	DOV	MAR	NWS	CLT	CAR	PHO	ATL		NA	-	
1996	Barkdoll Racing	73	Chevy	DAY	CAR	RCH	ATL	DAR	BRI	NWS	MAR	TAL; DNQ	SON	CLT	DOV	POC	MCH	DAY	NHA	POC	TAL	IND	GLN	MCH	BRI	DAR	RCH	DOV	MAR	NWS	CLT	CAR	PHO	ATL		NA	-	
1997	Barkdoll Racing	73	Chevy	DAY; QL^{†}	CAR	RCH	ATL	DAR	TEX	BRI	MAR	SON	TAL; DNQ	CLT	DOV	POC	MCH	CAL	DAY	NHA	POC	IND	GLN	MCH	BRI	DAR	RCH	NHA	DOV	MAR	CLT	TAL	CAR	PHO	ATL	NA	-	
^{†} - Qualified but replaced by Joe Nemechek

===== Daytona 500 =====
Year	Team	Manufacturer	Start	Finish
1986	Barkdoll Racing	Ford	DNQ	
1987	Barkdoll Racing	Oldsmobile	DNQ	
1988	Barkdoll Racing	Ford	25	36
1989	Barkdoll Racing	Oldsmobile	31	31
1990	Barkdoll Racing	Oldsmobile	35	39
1991	Barkdoll Racing	Oldsmobile	29	20
1992	Barkdoll Racing	Oldsmobile	25	17
1994	Barkdoll Racing	Chevrolet	DNQ	
1995	Barkdoll Racing	Ford	DNQ	
1997	Barkdoll Racing	Chevrolet	QL^{†}	
^{†} - Qualified but replaced by Joe Nemechek

=== ARCA Hooters SuperCar Series ===
(key) (Bold – Pole position awarded by qualifying time. Italics – Pole position earned by points standings or practice time. * – Most laps led.)

ARCA Hooters SuperCar Series results
Year	Team	No.	Make	1	2	3	4	5	6	7	8	9	10	11	12	13	14	15	16	17	18	19	20	21	AHSSC	Pts	Ref
1982	Barkdoll Racing	00	Dodge	NSV	DAY; 11	TAL; 5	FRS	CMS	WIN	NSV	TAT	TAL; 11	FRS	BFS	MIL; 19	SND									17th	460	
1983	Barkdoll Racing	00	Dodge	DAY; 27	NSV	TAL; 12	LPR	LPR	ISF	IRP	SSP	FRS	BFS	WIN	LPR	POC									NA	0	
1983	Barkdoll Racing	38	Buick														TAL; 35	MCS	FRS	MIL	DSF	ZAN	SND		NA	0	
1994	Venturini Motorsports	35	Chevy	DAY	TAL	FIF	LVL	KIL	TOL	FRS	MCH	DMS; 18	POC	POC	KIL	FRS	INF	I70	ISF	DSF	TOL	SLM	WIN	ATL	110th	-	
Results before 1985 may be incomplete.
