= Charlie Baker (racing driver) =

American racing driver

Charlie Baker, born in 1952, is a NASCAR driver. He made twelve Winston Cup starts in his career, with a best finish of eighteenth.

Baker was better known as the most successful driver in GATR Big Rig racing history. Early in his career, driving the midnight blue No. 39 Kenworth, he entered the very first GATR race at Atlanta Motor Speedway in 1979. Baker may have been the only driver to take part in every GATR race, from 1979 until 1993.

NASCAR career
Year	Rank	Points	Starts	Wins	Top 5	Top 10	Avg. start	Avg. finish	Winnings (US$)
1990	77	95	2	0	0	0	37.0	38.5	5325
1989	56	171	3	0	0	0	34.3	35.3	16370
1988	87	49	1	0	0	0	40.0	38.0	1590
1987	68	164	2	0	0	0	38.5	27.0	3615
1986	93	109	1	0	0	0	34.0	18.0	2500
1982	112	0	3	0	0	0	28.6	22.6	5325
