= Bank of America 400 =

Auto race held at Charlotte, United States

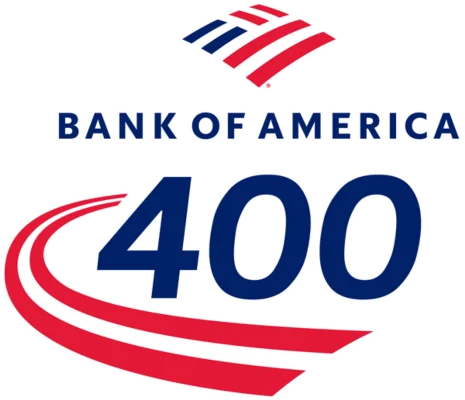

NASCAR Cup Series
- Venue: Charlotte Motor Speedway
- Location: Concord, North Carolina, United States
- Corporate sponsor: Bank of America
- First race: 1960
- Distance: 400.5 miles (644.542 km)
- Laps: 267; Stage 1: 80; Stage 2: 85; Final stage: 102
- Previous names: National 400 (1960–1965); National 500 (1966–1976, 1980–1982); NAPA National 500 (1977–1979); Miller High Life 500 (1983–1985); Oakwood Homes 500 (1986–1988); All Pro Auto Parts 500 (1989); Mello Yello 500 (1990–1994); UAW-GM Quality 500 (1995–2005); Bank of America 500 (2006–2008, 2010–2017); NASCAR Banking 500 only from Bank of America (2009); Alsco Uniforms 500 (2020)
- Most wins (driver): Jimmie Johnson (4)
- Most wins (team): Hendrick Motorsports (9)
- Most wins (manufacturer): Chevrolet (22)

Circuit information
- Surface: Asphalt
- Length: 1.5 mi (2.4 km)
- Turns: 4

The Bank of America 400 is a NASCAR Cup Series race held annually in the fall at Charlotte Motor Speedway in Concord, North Carolina, United States.

Held from 1960 to 2017, in 2020 in May, and in 2026 again in fall, it is held commonly in October. From 2018 to 2025, the race was replaced by a race on the "Roval" layout and was called the Bank of America Roval 400.

Chase Briscoe is the defending winner of the event, having won it in 2026.

== History ==
The race had been a Sunday afternoon event until 2002. That year, rain delayed the start by over 3 hours, causing much of the race to be run under the lights. Thanks in large part to the ratings boost NBC received in primetime hours, NASCAR made a decision to move the race date from Sunday afternoon to Saturday night from 2003 to 2016. NBC retained their rights to broadcast the race, which normally aired on TNT. With the move, then-Lowe's Motor Speedway became one of only two tracks in NASCAR to have two-night dates on the schedule.

In 2015 and 2016, the races on Saturday night were canceled due to bad weather, so they were run on Sunday afternoon. At the 2017 event, after rain caused the Xfinity Series event of the Saturday afternoon to be delayed by several hours, a decision was made to move the Cup race an hour back to a 1:00 PM local time start. The race eventually concluded successfully after 3 and a half hours without the occurrence of any rain delays.

Starting in 2018, the race was replaced by a 2.28 miles (3.67 km) road course configuration of the speedway, the Bank of America Roval 400, with a race distance of 400 kilometres (250 mi) over 109 laps.

Due to schedule changes resulting from the COVID-19 pandemic, Charlotte Motor Speedway hosted an additional 500-kilometer (312 mile) race in 2020 called the Alsco Uniforms 500 on the Wednesday following the Coca-Cola 600. It was run as a replacement for the Toyota/Save Mart 350 at Sonoma Raceway after the track announced that NASCAR had canceled its events at the road course due to the pandemic.

On February 3, 2026, despite the Roval layout being planned on the schedule, NASCAR announced that the fall Charlotte race would return to the oval layout.

== Past winners ==
| Year | Date | No. | Driver | Team | Manufacturer | Race Distance | | Race Time | Average Speed (mph) | Report | Ref |
| Year | Date | No. | Driver | Team | Manufacturer | Laps | Miles (km) | Race Time | Average Speed (mph) | Report | Ref |
|---|---|---|---|---|---|---|---|---|---|---|---|
| 1960 | October 16 | 21 | Speedy Thompson | Wood Brothers Racing | Ford | 267 | 400.5 (644.542) | 3:32:50 | 112.905 | Report | |
| 1961 | October 15 | 8 | Joe Weatherly | Bud Moore Engineering | Pontiac | 267 | 400.5 (644.542) | 3:20:20 | 119.95 | Report | |
| 1962 | October 14 | 3 | Junior Johnson | Ray Fox | Pontiac | 267 | 400.5 (644.542) | 3:01:42 | 132.085 | Report | |
| 1963 | October 13 | 3 | Junior Johnson | Ray Fox | Chevrolet | 267 | 400.5 (644.542) | 3:01:54 | 132.105 | Report | |
| 1964 | October 18 | 28 | Fred Lorenzen | Holman-Moody | Ford | 267 | 400.5 (644.542) | 2:58:35 | 134.475 | Report | |
| 1965 | October 17 | 28 | Fred Lorenzen | Holman-Moody | Ford | 267 | 400.5 (644.542) | 3:21:44 | 119.117 | Report | |
| 1966 | October 16 | 12 | Lee Roy Yarbrough | Jon Thorne | Dodge | 334 | 501 (806.281) | 3:49:55 | 130.576 | Report | |
| 1967 | October 15 | 3 | Buddy Baker | Ray Fox | Dodge | 334 | 501 (806.281) | 3:50:04 | 130.317 | Report | |
| 1968 | October 20 | 6 | Charlie Glotzbach | Cotton Owens | Dodge | 334 | 501 (806.281) | 3:42:08 | 135.234 | Report | |
| 1969 | October 12 | 27 | Donnie Allison | Banjo Matthews | Ford | 334 | 501 (806.281) | 3:48:32 | 131.271 | Report | |
| 1970 | October 11 | 98 | Lee Roy Yarbrough | Junior Johnson & Associates | Mercury | 334 | 501 (806.281) | 4:03:28 | 123.246 | Report | |
| 1971 | October 10 | 12 | Bobby Allison | Holman-Moody | Mercury | 238* | 357 (574.535) | 2:49:38 | 126.14 | Report | |
| 1972 | October 8 | 12 | Bobby Allison | Richard Howard | Chevrolet | 334 | 501 (806.281) | 3:45:37 | 133.234 | Report | |
| 1973 | October 7 | 11 | Cale Yarborough | Richard Howard | Chevrolet | 334 | 501 (806.281) | 3:26:58 | 145.24 | Report | |
| 1974 | October 6 | 21 | David Pearson | Wood Brothers Racing | Mercury | 334 | 501 (806.281) | 4:10:41 | 119.912 | Report | |
| 1975 | October 5 | 43 | Richard Petty | Petty Enterprises | Dodge | 334 | 501 (806.281) | 3:47:22 | 132.209 | Report | |
| 1976 | October 10 | 1 | Donnie Allison | Ellington Racing | Chevrolet | 334 | 501 (806.281) | 3:32:51 | 141.226 | Report | |
| 1977 | October 9 | 72 | Benny Parsons | L.G. DeWitt | Chevrolet | 334 | 501 (806.281) | 3:30:32 | 142.78 | Report | |
| 1978 | October 8 | 15 | Bobby Allison | Bud Moore Engineering | Ford | 334 | 501 (806.281) | 3:31:57 | 141.826 | Report | |
| 1979 | October 7 | 11 | Cale Yarborough | Junior Johnson & Associates | Chevrolet | 334 | 501 (806.281) | 3:43:53 | 134.266 | Report | |
| 1980 | October 5 | 2 | Dale Earnhardt | Rod Osterlund Racing | Chevrolet | 334 | 501 (806.281) | 3:42:18 | 135.243 | Report | |
| 1981 | October 11 | 11 | Darrell Waltrip | Junior Johnson & Associates | Buick | 334 | 501 (806.281) | 4:15:52 | 117.483 | Report | |
| 1982 | October 10 | 33 | Harry Gant | Mach 1 Racing | Buick | 334 | 501 (806.281) | 3:39:05 | 137.208 | Report | |
| 1983 | October 9 | 43 | Richard Petty | Petty Enterprises | Pontiac | 334 | 501 (806.281) | 3:34:43 | 139.998 | Report | |
| 1984 | October 7 | 9 | Bill Elliott | Melling Racing | Ford | 334 | 501 (806.281) | 3:24:41 | 148.861 | Report | |
| 1985 | October 6 | 28 | Cale Yarborough | Ranier-Lundy | Ford | 334 | 501 (806.281) | 3:39:48 | 136.761 | Report | |
| 1986 | October 5 | 3 | Dale Earnhardt | Richard Childress Racing | Chevrolet | 334 | 501 (806.281) | 3:47:02 | 132.403 | Report | |
| 1987 | October 11 | 9 | Bill Elliott | Melling Racing | Ford | 334 | 501 (806.281) | 3:54:02 | 128.443 | Report | |
| 1988 | October 9 | 27 | Rusty Wallace | Blue Max Racing | Pontiac | 334 | 501 (806.281) | 3:50:02 | 130.677 | Report | |
| 1989 | October 8 | 25 | Ken Schrader | Hendrick Motorsports | Chevrolet | 334 | 501 (806.281) | 3:20:35 | 149.863 | Report | |
| 1990 | October 7 | 28 | Davey Allison | Robert Yates Racing | Ford | 334 | 501 (806.281) | 3:38:44 | 137.428 | Report | |
| 1991 | October 6 | 11 | Geoffrey Bodine | Junior Johnson & Associates | Ford | 334 | 501 (806.281) | 3:36:17 | 138.984 | Report | |
| 1992 | October 11 | 6 | Mark Martin | Roush Racing | Ford | 334 | 501 (806.281) | 3:15:47 | 153.537 | Report | |
| 1993 | October 10 | 28 | Ernie Irvan | Robert Yates Racing | Ford | 334 | 501 (806.281) | 3:14:31 | 154.537 | Report | |
| 1994 | October 9 | 18 | Dale Jarrett | Joe Gibbs Racing | Chevrolet | 334 | 501 (806.281) | 3:26:00 | 145.922 | Report | |
| 1995 | October 8 | 6 | Mark Martin | Roush Racing | Ford | 334 | 501 (806.281) | 3:26:48 | 145.358 | Report | |
| 1996 | October 6 | 5 | Terry Labonte | Hendrick Motorsports | Chevrolet | 334 | 501 (806.281) | 3:30:00 | 143.143 | Report | |
| 1997 | October 5 | 88 | Dale Jarrett | Robert Yates Racing | Ford | 334 | 501 (806.281) | 3:28:17 | 144.323 | Report | |
| 1998 | October 4 | 6 | Mark Martin | Roush Racing | Ford | 334 | 501 (806.281) | 4:04:01 | 123.188 | Report | |
| 1999 | October 11* | 24 | Jeff Gordon | Hendrick Motorsports | Chevrolet | 334 | 501 (806.281) | 3:07:31 | 160.306 | Report | |
| 2000 | October 8 | 18 | Bobby Labonte | Joe Gibbs Racing | Pontiac | 334 | 501 (806.281) | 3:44:57 | 133.63 | Report | |
| 2001 | October 7 | 40 | Sterling Marlin | Chip Ganassi Racing | Dodge | 334 | 501 (806.281) | 3:36:15 | 139.006 | Report | |
| 2002 | October 13 | 40 | Jamie McMurray | Chip Ganassi Racing | Dodge | 334 | 501 (806.281) | 3:32:28 | 141.481 | Report | |
| 2003 | October 11 | 20 | Tony Stewart | Joe Gibbs Racing | Chevrolet | 334 | 501 (806.281) | 3:30:24 | 142.871 | Report | |
| 2004 | October 16 | 48 | Jimmie Johnson | Hendrick Motorsports | Chevrolet | 334 | 501 (806.281) | 3:50:51 | 130.214 | Report | |
| 2005 | October 15 | 48 | Jimmie Johnson | Hendrick Motorsports | Chevrolet | 336* | 504 (811.109) | 4:11:18 | 120.334 | Report | |
| 2006 | October 14 | 9 | Kasey Kahne | Evernham Motorsports | Dodge | 334 | 501 (806.281) | 3:47:29 | 132.142 | Report | |
| 2007 | October 13 | 24 | Jeff Gordon | Hendrick Motorsports | Chevrolet | 337* | 505.5 (813.523) | 4:00:58 | 125.868 | Report | |
| 2008 | October 11 | 31 | Jeff Burton | Richard Childress Racing | Chevrolet | 334 | 501 (806.281) | 3:44:50 | 133.699 | Report | |
| 2009 | October 17 | 48 | Jimmie Johnson | Hendrick Motorsports | Chevrolet | 334 | 501 (806.281) | 3:38:22 | 137.658 | Report | |
| 2010 | October 16 | 1 | Jamie McMurray | Earnhardt Ganassi Racing | Chevrolet | 334 | 501 (806.281) | 3:34:07 | 140.391 | Report | |
| 2011 | October 15 | 17 | Matt Kenseth | Roush Fenway Racing | Ford | 334 | 501 (806.281) | 3:25:37 | 146.194 | Report | |
| 2012 | October 13 | 15 | Clint Bowyer | Michael Waltrip Racing | Toyota | 334 | 501 (806.281) | 3:14:01 | 154.935 | Report | |
| 2013 | October 12 | 2 | Brad Keselowski | Penske Racing | Ford | 334 | 501 (806.281) | 3:09:53 | 158.308 | Report | |
| 2014 | October 11 | 4 | Kevin Harvick | Stewart–Haas Racing | Chevrolet | 334 | 501 (806.281) | 3:26:49 | 145.346 | Report | |
| 2015 | October 11* | 22 | Joey Logano | Team Penske | Ford | 334 | 501 (806.281) | 3:35:05 | 139.76 | Report | |
| 2016 | October 9* | 48 | Jimmie Johnson | Hendrick Motorsports | Chevrolet | 334 | 501 (806.281) | 3:42:47 | 134.929 | Report | |
| 2017 | October 8 | 78 | Martin Truex Jr. | Furniture Row Racing | Toyota | 337* | 505.5 (813.523) | 3:38:00 | 139.128 | Report | |
| 2018 – 2019 | Not held | | | | | | | | | | |
| 2020 | May 28* | 9 | Chase Elliott | Hendrick Motorsports | Chevrolet | 208 | 312 (502.008) | 2:29:23 | 125.315 | Report | |
| 2021 – 2025 | Not held | | | | | | | | | | |
| 2026 | October 11 | 19 | Chase Briscoe | Joe Gibbs Racing | Toyota | 267 | 400.5 (644.541) | 2:52:11 | 139.561 | Report | |
| 2027 | October 17 | | | | | | | | | Report | |

=== Notes ===
- 1971: Race was shortened due to rain.
- 1999: Race was postponed from Sunday to Monday due to rain.
- 2005, 2007 and 2017: The race was extended due to a NASCAR Overtime finish.
- 2015 and 2016: The race was postponed from Saturday night to Sunday afternoon due to rain.
- 2020: The race was moved from Wednesday to Thursday because of rain.

=== Multiple winners (drivers) ===
| # Wins | Driver | Years won |
|---|---|---|
| 4 | Jimmie Johnson | 2004–2005, 2009, 2016 |
| 3 | Bobby Allison | 1971–1972, 1978 |
| 3 | Cale Yarborough | 1973, 1979, 1985 |
| 3 | Mark Martin | 1992, 1995, 1998 |
| 2 | Junior Johnson | 1962–1963 |
| 2 | Fred Lorenzen | 1964–1965 |
| 2 | LeeRoy Yarbrough | 1966, 1970 |
| 2 | Donnie Allison | 1969, 1976 |
| 2 | Richard Petty | 1975, 1983 |
| 2 | Dale Earnhardt | 1980, 1986 |
| 2 | Bill Elliott | 1984, 1987 |
| 2 | Dale Jarrett | 1994, 1997 |
| 2 | Jeff Gordon | 1999, 2007 |
| 2 | Jamie McMurray | 2002, 2010 |

=== Multiple winners (teams) ===
| # Wins | Team | Years won |
|---|---|---|
| 9 | Hendrick Motorsports | 1989, 1996, 1999, 2004–2005, 2007, 2009, 2016, 2020 |
| 4 | Junior Johnson & Associates | 1970, 1979, 1981, 1991 |
| 4 | Roush Fenway Racing | 1992, 1995, 1998, 2011 |
| 4 | Joe Gibbs Racing | 1994, 2000, 2003, 2026 |
| 3 | Ray Fox | 1962–1963, 1967 |
| 3 | Holman-Moody | 1964–1965, 1971 |
| 3 | Chip Ganassi Racing | 2001–2002, 2010 |
| 3 | Robert Yates Racing | 1990, 1993, 1997 |
| 2 | Team Penske | 2013, 2015 |
| 2 | Wood Brothers Racing | 1960, 1974 |
| 2 | Bud Moore Engineering | 1961, 1978 |
| 2 | Richard Howard | 1972–1973 |
| 2 | Melling Racing | 1984, 1987 |
| 2 | Richard Childress Racing | 1986, 2008 |

=== Manufacturer wins ===
| # Wins | Manufacturer | Years won |
|---|---|---|
| 22 | Chevrolet | 1963, 1972–1973, 1976–1977, 1979–1980, 1986, 1989, 1994, 1996, 1999, 2003–2005, 2007–2010, 2014, 2016, 2020 |
| 18 | Ford | 1960, 1964–1965, 1969, 1978, 1984–1985, 1987, 1990–1993, 1995, 1997–1998, 2011, 2013, 2015 |
| 7 | Dodge | 1966–1968, 1975, 2001–2002, 2006 |
| 5 | Pontiac | 1961–1962, 1983, 1988, 2000 |
| 3 | Mercury | 1970–1971, 1974 |
| 3 | Toyota | 2012, 2017, 2026 |
| 2 | Buick | 1981–1982 |

== Notable races ==
- 1964: Fred Lorenzen took lead with two laps to go after Richard Petty, who led 188 laps, blew a tire and crashed. Paul Goldsmith led 71 laps before blowing his engine.
- 1965: Lorenzen won for the second straight year after a wild three-abreast battle with Curtis Turner and Dick Hutcherson for first. The race was a tragic affair as a massive crash claimed the life of Harold Kite.
- 1970: LeeRoy Yarbrough took what turned out to be his final Grand National win.
- 1971: Bobby Allison in the Holman-Moody Mercury battled Charlie Glotzbach, driving the Chevrolet Monte Carlo fielded by track president Richard Howard. Allison took the lead on Lap 177 and led when rain shortened the race at Lap 238. LeeRoy Yarbrough drove a second Howard Chevrolet, reuniting with team manager Junior Johnson, for whom Leeroy had driven earlier than the 1971 season.
- 1973: Controversies plagued the weekend. Charlie Glotzbach won the pole in Hoss Ellington's Chevrolet but NASCAR discovered a moveable restrictor-plate after qualifying and put Glotzbach to the back of the field. Buddy Baker was pulled out of the race 228 laps in by team owner Nord Krauskopf when NASCAR said it wanted to reinspect the #71 Dodge after the race. David Pearson and Glotzbach crashed 40 laps in, leaving Petty, Cale Yarborough, and Bobby Allison in charge. Yarborough and Petty put Allison three laps down en route to the 1-2 finish. But following the race controversy ensued over the post race inspection of the top three cars; Allison's Chevy cleared after one hour but six hours after the inspection NASCAR announced the results for Yarborough's #11 would receive further study, and Allison claimed to have seen Petty's team remove the air filter from the car before it could be inspected; track promoter Richard Howard threatened a lawsuit if the race results were changed. Allison claimed the top two finishers were illegal and threatened to sue NASCAR; Petty asserted only three of his engine's eight cylinders were checked; a later meeting between Allison and Bill France Jr. settled the controversy.
- 1974: The race set an event record for lead changes at 47. David Pearson lost two laps 150 miles in but made up the deficit and surged to the win. The race was marred by a ten-car crash in which Marty Robbins suffered serious facial injuries, a two-car crash involving Grant Adcox and Ramo Stott, and a pit fire in Richard Petty's pit.
- 1975: Petty took the win for a season sweep at Charlotte. The 500 was the final race for track under the promotion of Richard Howard as Bruton Smith would take control of the speedway the following January.
- 1976: Donnie Allison surprised the field by winning, his first Winston Cup win since 1971 and the first for team owner Hoss Ellington. The engine measured slightly over the 358 cubic inch limit; after a lengthy discussion, the engine was allowed to cool down and it measured below 358 cubic inches; Ellington quipped, "This one's legal. We left all the cheater stuff at Darlington."
- 1978: Bobby Allison broke out of a competitive race to winning handily. The lead changed 40 times. David Pearson won the pole, his 11th straight Charlotte pole.
- 1980: Dale Earnhardt edged Buddy Baker and Cale Yarborough and solidified his point lead over Yarborough with three races to go in the season. The win was Earnhardt's fifth of his second career Winston Cup season. The weekend was dominated by a controversy between Darrell Waltrip and the DiGard Racing team as Waltrip announced he was leaving the team after the season despite threats of legal action by team owners the Gardner brothers to retain him. Waltrip spun out after breaking a sway bar piece, then fell out with engine failure, angrily demanding afterward he needed to "get away from these Gardners."
- 1981: Darrell Waltrip's late-season victory surge included leading the final 61 laps of 1981 500. Bobby Allison finished second and after leading the series in August was now trailing by 58 laps. Harry Gant led Lap 3 before his engine erupted in the first turn.
- 1982 Gant broke through to his first superspeedway win as he edged Bill Elliott in a ten-lap showdown after Bobby Allison, who led 280 laps, blew his engine. A ten-car crash erupted when Dale Earnhardt hooked Richard Petty into a spin.
- 1983: The race was marred by controversy involving an outsized engine for race winner Richard Petty as well as suspicion about runner-up Darrell Waltrip; Petty was subsequently fined $35,000 and 104 NASCAR points.
- 1985: Cale Yarborough lost a lap on five separate occasions and made them up all five times for his final NASCAR win.
- 1993: Ernie Irvan led race-record 328 laps for his second win with Robert Yates. NASCAR shaved spoiler size to five inches and raised the front air dam a few inches out of concern for escalating track speeds and believing, following driver lobbying, that reducing downforce would force drivers to slow down for the turns. The change did not reduce speeds.
- 1994: Dale Jarrett stole the win after engine failure eliminated Geoff Bodine and a late crash eliminated Ricky Rudd and Jeff Gordon; the win was Jarrett's final win with Joe Gibbs Racing.
- 1996: Terry Labonte dominated and erased a point gap of over 100 to Jeff Gordon, who fell out with engine failure. The race was marred by a brutal multi-car crash involving Ernie Irvan when Irvan spun out and was center-punched by John Andretti.
- 2000: Bobby Labonte broke out of a fierce fight with Dale Earnhardt, Ricky Rudd, and Jeremy Mayfield to grab the win. The weekend was marred by a sudden shortage of tires available from Goodyear, but the race went with no problems with tires. The lead changed 46 times, the first Charlotte race to break 40 lead changes since 1988.
- 2002: Subbing for injured regular Sterling Marlin, Jamie McMurray grabbed his first win in his second career NASCAR start. A major crash erupted in the trioval and brought out a furious response from team owner Richard Childress.
- 2005: For weeks leading up to the race, and coming off the caution-filled Coca-Cola 600 that saw a NASCAR-record 22 cautions due to the levigating of the track's surface, they levigated the rest of the oval. This led to more grip and increased speeds that weighed heavy on the tread of the tires. During the race, drivers were on edge with tire issues that plagued the Xfinity event the night before and it continued in the Cup event. It was marred by 15 cautions that were mostly for someone having a right-front tire go down and slam straight into the wall on the right side every 25-30 laps no matter how much they backed down. Around lap 200 a competition caution was thrown, and there was worry that with all the tire issues, the race would be truncated, although it did go the distance. Jimmie Johnson started in the back, and despite a tire rub late in the race while taking the lead, held off Kurt Busch and Greg Biffle in an overtime finish to score his fourth-consecutive win at Charlotte with sweeps of the events in 2004 and 2005. He became the first driver to win four races in a row since Dale Earnhardt Jr. at Talladega Superspeedway.

| Previous race: South Point 400 | NASCAR Cup Series; Bank of America 400 | Next race: Freeway Insurance 500 |
