= John McFadden =

American racing driver

- Born: November 4, 1951 (age 75); Forest City, North Carolina, U.S.

NASCAR Cup Series career
- 11 races run over 7 years
- Best finish: 52nd (1992)
- First race: 1982 Valleydale 500 (Bristol)
- Last race: 1992 AC Delco 500 (Rockingham)
Wins	Top tens	Poles
0	0	0

NASCAR O'Reilly Auto Parts Series career
- 4 races run over 2 years
- Best finish: 92nd (1983)
- First race: 1982 Goody's 300 (Daytona)
- Last race: 1983 Miller Time 300 (Charlotte)
Wins	Top tens	Poles
0	0	0
- Statistics up to date as of April 17, 2023.

John McFadden (born November 4, 1951) is an American former professional stock car racing driver. McFadden competed in eleven total NASCAR Winston Cup Series races, four NASCAR Busch Series starts, and eleven ARCA starts. McFadden was noted in the 1992 NASCAR Winston Cup Series for entering races with low car counts in a backup car fielded by Jimmy Means, a precursor to the practice of start and park.

== Motorsports career results ==
=== NASCAR ===
(key) (Bold – Pole position awarded by qualifying time. Italics – Pole position earned by points standings or practice time. * – Most laps led.)

==== Winston Cup Series ====
NASCAR Winston Cup Series results
Year	Team	No.	Make	1	2	3	4	5	6	7	8	9	10	11	12	13	14	15	16	17	18	19	20	21	22	23	24	25	26	27	28	29	30	NWCC	Pts	Ref
1982	Will Cronkrite	86	Buick	DAY	RCH	BRI; 24	ATL	CAR	DAR	NWS	MAR	TAL	NSV	DOV	CLT	POC	RSD	MCH	DAY	NSV	POC	TAL	MCH	BRI	DAR	RCH	DOV	NWS						87th	91	
1982	John McFadden	45	Buick																										CLT; DNQ	MAR	CAR	ATL; DNQ	RSD	87th	91	
1983	John McFadden	45	Buick	DAY	RCH	CAR	ATL	DAR	NWS; DNQ	MAR	TAL	NSV	DOV	BRI	CLT	RSD	POC	MCH	DAY	NSV	POC	TAL	MCH	BRI; 29	DAR	RCH	DOV	MAR	NWS; 28	CLT	CAR; 35	ATL; DNQ	RSD	87th	213	
1984	John McFadden	45	Buick	DAY	RCH	CAR	ATL	BRI	NWS	DAR	MAR	TAL	NSV	DOV	CLT	RSD	POC	MCH; DNQ	DAY	NSV	POC	TAL	MCH	BRI; DNQ	DAR	RCH	DOV	MAR	CLT	NWS; DNQ	CAR	ATL	RSD	N/A	0	
1988	John McFadden	24	Chevy	DAY	RCH	CAR	ATL	DAR	BRI	NWS	MAR	TAL	CLT	DOV	RSD	POC	MCH	DAY	POC	TAL	GLN	MCH	BRI	DAR	RCH	DOV	MAR	CLT; DNQ	NWS	CAR	PHO	ATL		N/A	0	
1989	John McFadden	24	Chevy	DAY	CAR	ATL	RCH	DAR	BRI	NWS	MAR	TAL	CLT; DNQ	DOV	SON	POC	MCH							DAR; 31	RCH	DOV	MAR	CLT	NWS	CAR	PHO	ATL		67th	113	
1989	John McFadden	24	Pontiac															DAY; 40	POC	TAL	GLN	MCH	BRI											67th	113	
1992	Jimmy Means Racing	53	Pontiac	DAY	CAR; 40	RCH	ATL	DAR; 37	BRI	NWS	MAR	TAL; 40	CLT	DOV	SON	POC	MCH	DAY	POC	TAL	GLN	MCH	BRI	DAR; 38	RCH	DOV	MAR	NWS	CLT	CAR; 40	PHO	ATL		52nd	230	
1993	Jimmy Means Racing	62	Ford	DAY	CAR	RCH	ATL	DAR; DNQ	BRI	NWS	MAR	TAL	SON	CLT	DOV	POC	MCH	DAY	NHA	POC	TAL	GLN	MCH	BRI	DAR	RCH	DOV	MAR	NWS	CLT	CAR	PHO	ATL	N/A	0	

==== Budweiser Late Model Sportsman Series ====
NASCAR Budweiser Late Model Sportsman Series results
Year	Team	No.	Make	1	2	3	4	5	6	7	8	9	10	11	12	13	14	15	16	17	18	19	20	21	22	23	24	25	26	27	28	29	30	31	32	33	34	35	NBLMSSC	Pts	Ref
1982	info not available	82	Pontiac	DAY; 33	RCH	BRI; 29	MAR	DAR	HCY; DNQ	SBO	CRW	RCH	LGY	DOV	HCY	CLT	ASH	HCY	SBO	CAR	CRW	SBO	HCY	LGY	IRP	BRI	HCY	RCH	MAR	CLT	HCY	MAR							110th	140	
1983	info not available	58	Pontiac	DAY	RCH	CAR	HCY	MAR	NWS	SBO	GPS	LGY	DOV	BRI	CLT; 26	SBO	HCY	ROU	SBO	ROU	CRW	ROU	SBO	HCY	LGY	IRP	GPS	BRI	HCY	DAR	RCH	NWS	SBO	MAR	ROU	CLT; 17	HCY	MAR	126th	97	
