= 1986 TranSouth 500 =

Sixth race of the 1986 NASCAR Winston Cup Series

Race details
- Race 6 of 29 in the 1986 NASCAR Winston Cup Series
- The 1986 TranSouth 500 program cover, featuring Bill Elliott and Jack Ingram.
- Date: April 13, 1986
- Official name: 30th Annual TranSouth 500
- Location: Darlington, South Carolina, Darlington Raceway
- Course: Permanent racing facility
- Course length: 1.366 miles (2.198 km)
- Distance: 367 laps, 501.322 mi (806.799 km)
- Scheduled distance: 367 laps, 501.322 mi (806.799 km)
- Average speed: 128.994 miles per hour (207.596 km/h)

Pole position
Driver	Geoff Bodine	Hendrick Motorsports
- Time: 30.890

Most laps led
Driver	Dale Earnhardt	Richard Childress Racing
- Laps: 335

Winner
No. 3	Dale Earnhardt	Richard Childress Racing

Television in the United States
- Network: ESPN
- Announcers: Bob Jenkins, Jack Arute

Radio in the United States
- Radio: Motor Racing Network

The 1986 TranSouth 500 was the sixth stock car race of the 1986 NASCAR Winston Cup Series and the iteration of the event. The race was held on Sunday, April 13, 1986, in Darlington, South Carolina, at Darlington Raceway, a 1.366 miles (2.198 km) permanent egg-shaped oval racetrack. The race took 367 laps.

In a race of attrition, Richard Childress Racing's Dale Earnhardt held off Junior Johnson & Associates' Darrell Waltrip on the final restart with two laps left, completing a dominant performance where he led 335 of the total 367 laps. The victory was Earnhardt's 16th career NASCAR Winston Cup Series victory and his first victory of the season. To fill out the top three, the Waltrip and Stavola Brothers Racing's Bobby Allison finished second and third, respectively.

== Background ==
The layout of Darlington Raceway, the venue where the race was held.

Darlington Raceway is a race track built for NASCAR racing located near Darlington, South Carolina. It is nicknamed "The Lady in Black" and "The Track Too Tough to Tame" by many NASCAR fans and drivers and advertised as "A NASCAR Tradition." It is of a unique, somewhat egg-shaped design, an oval with the ends of very different configurations, a condition which supposedly arose from the proximity of one end of the track to a minnow pond the owner refused to relocate. This situation makes it very challenging for the crews to set up their cars' handling in a way that is effective at both ends.

=== Entry list ===
- (R) denotes rookie driver.

#	Driver	Team	Make
1	Sterling Marlin	Ellington Racing	Chevrolet
01	Earle Canavan	Canavan Racing	Pontiac
3	Dale Earnhardt	Richard Childress Racing	Chevrolet
4	Rick Wilson	Morgan–McClure Motorsports	Oldsmobile
5	Geoff Bodine	Hendrick Motorsports	Chevrolet
6	Trevor Boys	U.S. Racing	Chevrolet
7	Kyle Petty	Wood Brothers Racing	Ford
8	Bobby Hillin Jr.	Stavola Brothers Racing	Chevrolet
9	Bill Elliott	Melling Racing	Ford
11	Darrell Waltrip	Junior Johnson & Associates	Chevrolet
12	Neil Bonnett	Junior Johnson & Associates	Chevrolet
15	Ricky Rudd	Bud Moore Engineering	Ford
17	Doug Heveron	Hamby Racing	Chevrolet
18	Tommy Ellis	Freedlander Motorsports	Chevrolet
22	Bobby Allison	Stavola Brothers Racing	Buick
23	Michael Waltrip (R)	Bahari Racing	Pontiac
25	Tim Richmond	Hendrick Motorsports	Chevrolet
26	Joe Ruttman	King Racing	Buick
27	Rusty Wallace	Blue Max Racing	Pontiac
28	Cale Yarborough	Ranier-Lundy Racing	Ford
33	Harry Gant	Mach 1 Racing	Chevrolet
35	Alan Kulwicki (R)	AK Racing	Ford
36	H. B. Bailey	Bailey Racing	Pontiac
43	Richard Petty	Petty Enterprises	Pontiac
44	Terry Labonte	Hagan Enterprises	Oldsmobile
47	Morgan Shepherd	Race Hill Farm Team	Chevrolet
48	Ronnie Thomas	Hylton Motorsports	Chevrolet
52	Jimmy Means	Jimmy Means Racing	Pontiac
55	Benny Parsons	Jackson Bros. Motorsports	Oldsmobile
64	Connie Saylor	Langley Racing	Ford
66	Phil Parsons	Jackson Bros. Motorsports	Oldsmobile
67	Buddy Arrington	Arrington Racing	Ford
68	Mike Potter	Jimmy Walker Enterprises	Ford
70	J. D. McDuffie	McDuffie Racing	Pontiac
71	Dave Marcis	Marcis Auto Racing	Pontiac
74	Bobby Wawak	Wawak Racing	Chevrolet
75	Jody Ridley	RahMoc Enterprises	Pontiac
82	Mark Stahl	Stahl Racing	Ford
88	Buddy Baker	Baker–Schiff Racing	Oldsmobile
90	Ken Schrader	Donlavey Racing	Ford
91	David Sosebee	Sosebee Racing	Chevrolet
92	Jonathan Lee Edwards	Edwards Racing	Buick
94	Eddie Bierschwale	Eller Racing	Pontiac
95	Davey Allison	Sadler Brothers Racing	Chevrolet
98	Ron Bouchard	Curb Racing	Pontiac

== Qualifying ==
Qualifying was split into two rounds. The first round was held on Thursday, April 10, at 3:00 PM EST. Each driver had one lap to set a time. During the first round, the top 20 drivers in the round were guaranteed a starting spot in the race. If a driver was not able to guarantee a spot in the first round, they had the option to scrub their time from the first round and try and run a faster lap time in a second round qualifying run, held on Friday, April 11, at 2:00 PM EST. As with the first round, each driver had one lap to set a time. For this specific race, positions 21-40 were decided on time, and depending on who needed it, a select amount of positions were given to cars who had not otherwise qualified but were high enough in owner's points; up to two were given.

Geoff Bodine, driving for Hendrick Motorsports, won the pole, setting a time of 30.890 and an average speed of 159.197 mph (256.203 km/h) in the first round.

Five drivers failed to qualify.

=== Full qualifying results ===
Pos.	#	Driver	Team	Make	Time	Speed
1	5	Geoff Bodine	Hendrick Motorsports	Chevrolet	30.890	159.197
2	25	Tim Richmond	Hendrick Motorsports	Chevrolet	30.928	159.002
3	55	Benny Parsons	Jackson Bros. Motorsports	Oldsmobile	30.949	158.891
4	3	Dale Earnhardt	Richard Childress Racing	Chevrolet	31.009	158.586
5	12	Neil Bonnett	Junior Johnson & Associates	Chevrolet	31.215	157.540
6	26	Joe Ruttman	King Racing	Buick	31.380	156.711
7	1	Sterling Marlin	Ellington Racing	Chevrolet	31.404	156.592
8	15	Ricky Rudd	Bud Moore Engineering	Ford	31.418	156.522
9	33	Harry Gant	Mach 1 Racing	Chevrolet	31.451	156.358
10	11	Darrell Waltrip	Junior Johnson & Associates	Chevrolet	31.529	155.971
11	44	Terry Labonte	Hagan Enterprises	Oldsmobile	31.546	155.887
12	22	Bobby Allison	Stavola Brothers Racing	Buick	31.549	155.872
13	27	Rusty Wallace	Blue Max Racing	Pontiac	31.563	155.803
14	88	Buddy Baker	Baker–Schiff Racing	Chevrolet	31.567	155.783
15	47	Morgan Shepherd	Race Hill Farm Team	Buick	31.578	155.729
16	43	Richard Petty	Petty Enterprises	Pontiac	31.589	155.674
17	75	Jody Ridley	RahMoc Enterprises	Pontiac	31.707	155.095
18	8	Bobby Hillin Jr.	Stavola Brothers Racing	Buick	31.725	155.007
19	23	Michael Waltrip (R)	Bahari Racing	Pontiac	31.806	154.612
20	66	Phil Parsons	Jackson Bros. Motorsports	Pontiac	31.813	154.578
Failed to lock in the first round
21	9	Bill Elliott	Melling Racing	Ford	31.821	154.539
22	90	Ken Schrader	Donlavey Racing	Ford	31.927	154.026
23	28	Cale Yarborough	Ranier-Lundy Racing	Ford	31.942	153.954
24	98	Ron Bouchard	Curb Racing	Pontiac	32.052	153.426
25	4	Rick Wilson	Morgan–McClure Motorsports	Oldsmobile	32.139	153.010
26	95	Davey Allison	Sadler Brothers Racing	Chevrolet	32.158	152.920
27	7	Kyle Petty	Wood Brothers Racing	Ford	32.232	152.569
28	36	H. B. Bailey	Bailey Racing	Pontiac	32.253	152.470
29	35	Alan Kulwicki (R)	AK Racing	Ford	32.352	152.003
30	6	Trevor Boys	U.S. Racing	Chevrolet	32.399	151.782
31	52	Jimmy Means	Jimmy Means Racing	Pontiac	32.439	151.595
32	18	Tommy Ellis	Freedlander Motorsports	Oldsmobile	32.451	151.539
33	94	Eddie Bierschwale	Eller Racing	Pontiac	32.453	151.530
34	48	Ronnie Thomas	Hylton Motorsports	Chevrolet	32.462	151.488
35	71	Dave Marcis	Marcis Auto Racing	Chevrolet	32.637	150.676
36	17	Doug Heveron	Hamby Racing	Oldsmobile	32.717	150.307
37	64	Connie Saylor	Langley Racing	Ford	32.822	149.826
38	70	J. D. McDuffie	McDuffie Racing	Pontiac	32.937	149.303
39	74	Bobby Wawak	Wawak Racing	Buick	33.057	148.761
40	82	Mark Stahl	Stahl Racing	Ford	33.990	144.678
Failed to qualify (results unknown)
41	01	Earle Canavan	Canavan Racing	Pontiac	-*	-*
42	67	Buddy Arrington	Arrington Racing	Ford	-*	-*
43	68	Mike Potter	Walker Enterprises	Ford	-*	-*
44	91	David Sosebee	Sosebee Racing	Chevrolet	-*	-*
45	92	Jonathan Lee Edwards	Edwards Racing	Buick	-*	-*
Official first round qualifying results
Official starting lineup

== Race results ==
Fin	St	#	Driver	Team	Make	Laps	Led	Status	Pts	Winnings
1	4	3	Dale Earnhardt	Richard Childress Racing	Chevrolet	367	335	running	185	$52,250
2	10	11	Darrell Waltrip	Junior Johnson & Associates	Chevrolet	367	13	running	175	$31,600
3	12	22	Bobby Allison	Stavola Brothers Racing	Buick	366	1	running	170	$13,355
4	5	12	Neil Bonnett	Junior Johnson & Associates	Chevrolet	366	0	running	160	$16,480
5	2	25	Tim Richmond	Hendrick Motorsports	Chevrolet	364	5	running	160	$7,305
6	13	27	Rusty Wallace	Blue Max Racing	Pontiac	364	0	running	150	$12,575
7	16	43	Richard Petty	Petty Enterprises	Pontiac	364	0	running	146	$9,600
8	21	9	Bill Elliott	Melling Racing	Ford	362	0	running	142	$13,685
9	27	7	Kyle Petty	Wood Brothers Racing	Ford	361	0	running	138	$11,030
10	22	90	Ken Schrader	Donlavey Racing	Ford	356	0	running	134	$10,525
11	29	35	Alan Kulwicki (R)	AK Racing	Ford	344	0	running	130	$3,900
12	28	36	H. B. Bailey	Bailey Racing	Pontiac	343	0	running	127	$3,195
13	19	23	Michael Waltrip (R)	Bahari Racing	Pontiac	340	0	engine	124	$3,515
14	9	33	Harry Gant	Mach 1 Racing	Chevrolet	330	10	running	126	$11,435
15	25	4	Rick Wilson	Morgan–McClure Motorsports	Oldsmobile	329	0	running	118	$3,065
16	40	82	Mark Stahl	Stahl Racing	Ford	320	0	running	115	$2,520
17	38	70	J. D. McDuffie	McDuffie Racing	Pontiac	319	0	running	112	$6,585
18	37	64	Connie Saylor	Langley Racing	Ford	313	0	running	0	$6,365
19	39	74	Bobby Wawak	Wawak Racing	Buick	300	0	accident	106	$2,190
20	17	75	Jody Ridley	RahMoc Enterprises	Pontiac	292	0	running	103	$6,585
21	6	26	Joe Ruttman	King Racing	Buick	285	0	radiator	100	$1,995
22	23	28	Cale Yarborough	Ranier-Lundy Racing	Ford	267	0	engine	97	$2,535
23	15	47	Morgan Shepherd	Race Hill Farm Team	Buick	234	0	accident	94	$1,825
24	30	6	Trevor Boys	U.S. Racing	Chevrolet	227	0	brakes	91	$5,575
25	31	52	Jimmy Means	Jimmy Means Racing	Pontiac	212	0	accident	88	$5,435
26	8	15	Ricky Rudd	Bud Moore Engineering	Ford	207	1	accident	90	$9,605
27	35	71	Dave Marcis	Marcis Auto Racing	Chevrolet	201	1	water pump	87	$4,965
28	3	55	Benny Parsons	Jackson Bros. Motorsports	Oldsmobile	199	1	engine	84	$1,580
29	32	18	Tommy Ellis	Freedlander Motorsports	Oldsmobile	197	0	accident	76	$1,460
30	14	88	Buddy Baker	Baker–Schiff Racing	Chevrolet	149	0	valve	73	$1,420
31	20	66	Phil Parsons	Jackson Bros. Motorsports	Pontiac	147	0	accident	70	$1,380
32	11	44	Terry Labonte	Hagan Enterprises	Oldsmobile	146	0	timing chain	67	$8,090
33	7	1	Sterling Marlin	Ellington Racing	Chevrolet	140	0	engine	64	$1,300
34	33	94	Eddie Bierschwale	Eller Racing	Pontiac	130	0	a-frame	61	$1,265
35	36	17	Doug Heveron	Hamby Racing	Oldsmobile	111	0	engine	58	$4,440
36	34	48	Ronnie Thomas	Hylton Motorsports	Chevrolet	83	0	engine	55	$4,250
37	24	98	Ron Bouchard	Curb Racing	Pontiac	65	0	brakes	52	$3,950
38	18	8	Bobby Hillin Jr.	Stavola Brothers Racing	Buick	42	0	accident	49	$3,925
39	26	95	Davey Allison	Sadler Brothers Racing	Chevrolet	1	0	accident	46	$1,195
40	1	5	Geoff Bodine	Hendrick Motorsports	Chevrolet	1	0	camshaft	43	$11,005
Official race results

== Standings after the race ==
Drivers' Championship standings

	Pos	Driver	Points
	1	Darrell Waltrip	1,000
1	2	Dale Earnhardt	952 (-48)
1	3	Rusty Wallace	885 (-115)
2	4	Terry Labonte	861 (–139)
	5	Bill Elliott	832 (–168)
1	6	Kyle Petty	785 (–215)
2	7	Tim Richmond	773 (–227)
	8	Harry Gant	740 (–260)
1	9	Richard Petty	730 (–270)
3	10	Bobby Allison	726 (–273)
Official driver's standings

- Note: Only the first 10 positions are included for the driver standings.

Previous race: 1986 Valleydale 500	NASCAR Winston Cup Series; 1986 season	Next race: 1986 First Union 400
