= 1986 Valleydale 500 =

Fifth race of the 1986 NASCAR Winston Cup Series

Race details
- Race 5 of 29 in the 1986 NASCAR Winston Cup Series
- The 1986 Valleydale 500 program cover, featuring Dale Earnhardt.
- Date: April 6, 1986
- Official name: 26th Annual Valleydale 500
- Location: Bristol, Tennessee, Bristol International Raceway
- Course: Permanent racing facility
- Course length: 0.533 miles (0.858 km)
- Distance: 500 laps, 266.5 mi (428.89 km)
- Scheduled distance: 500 laps, 266.5 mi (428.89 km)
- Average speed: 89.747 miles per hour (144.434 km/h)
- Attendance: 34,200

Pole position
Driver	Geoff Bodine	Hendrick Motorsports
- Time: 16.707

Most laps led
Driver	Rusty Wallace	Blue Max Racing
- Laps: 174

Winner
No. 27	Rusty Wallace	Blue Max Racing

Television in the United States
- Network: ESPN
- Announcers: Bob Jenkins, Benny Parsons

Radio in the United States
- Radio: Motor Racing Network

The 1986 Valleydale 500 was the fifth stock car race of the 1986 NASCAR Winston Cup Series and the 26th iteration of the event. The race was held on Sunday, April 6, 1986, before an audience of 34,200 in Bristol, Tennessee, at Bristol International Raceway, a 0.533 miles (0.858 km) permanent oval-shaped racetrack.

By race's end, Blue Max Racing's Rusty Wallace managed to dominate the late stages of the race, leading the final 101 laps to take his first career NASCAR Winston Cup Series victory and his first victory of the season. To fill out the top three, Bud Moore Engineering's Ricky Rudd and Junior Johnson & Associates' Darrell Waltrip finished second and third, respectively.

== Background ==
The layout of Bristol International Raceway, the venue where the race was held.

The Bristol Motor Speedway, formerly known as Bristol International Raceway and Bristol Raceway, is a NASCAR short track venue located in Bristol, Tennessee. Constructed in 1960, it held its first NASCAR race on July 30, 1961. Despite its short length, Bristol is among the most popular tracks on the NASCAR schedule because of its distinct features, which include extraordinarily steep banking, an all concrete surface, two pit roads, and stadium-like seating. It has also been named one of the loudest NASCAR tracks.

=== Entry list ===
- (R) denotes rookie driver.

#	Driver	Team	Make	Sponsor
01	Earle Canavan	Canavan Racing	Pontiac	Gates Hydraulics
3	Dale Earnhardt	Richard Childress Racing	Chevrolet	Wrangler
4	Rick Wilson	Morgan–McClure Motorsports	Oldsmobile	Cap'n Coty's, Bewley Oldsmobile
5	Geoff Bodine	Hendrick Motorsports	Chevrolet	Levi Garrett
6	Trevor Boys	U.S. Racing	Chevrolet	U.S. Racing
7	Kyle Petty	Wood Brothers Racing	Ford	7-Eleven
8	Bobby Hillin Jr.	Stavola Brothers Racing	Chevrolet	Miller American
08	Butch Miller	Throop Racing	Buick	Classic Chevrolet
9	Bill Elliott	Melling Racing	Ford	Coors
11	Darrell Waltrip	Junior Johnson & Associates	Chevrolet	Budweiser
12	Neil Bonnett	Junior Johnson & Associates	Chevrolet	Budweiser
15	Ricky Rudd	Bud Moore Engineering	Ford	Motorcraft Quality Parts
17	Doug Heveron	Hamby Racing	Chevrolet	Protecta Truck Bed Liner
18	Tommy Ellis	Freedlander Motorsports	Chevrolet	Freedlander Financial
22	Bobby Allison	Stavola Brothers Racing	Buick	Miller American
23	Michael Waltrip (R)	Bahari Racing	Pontiac	Hawaiian Punch
25	Tim Richmond	Hendrick Motorsports	Chevrolet	Folgers
26	Joe Ruttman	King Racing	Buick	Quaker State
27	Rusty Wallace	Blue Max Racing	Pontiac	Alugard
30	Willy T. Ribbs	DiGard Motorsports	Pontiac	Red Roof Inn
33	Harry Gant	Mach 1 Racing	Chevrolet	Skoal Bandit
35	Alan Kulwicki (R)	AK Racing	Ford	Quincy's Steakhouse
41	Ronnie Thomas	Ronnie Thomas Racing	Chevrolet	Ronnie Thomas Racing
43	Richard Petty	Petty Enterprises	Pontiac	STP
44	Terry Labonte	Hagan Enterprises	Oldsmobile	Piedmont Airlines
48	James Hylton	Hylton Motorsports	Chevrolet	Hylton Motorsports
52	Jimmy Means	Jimmy Means Racing	Pontiac	Jimmy Means Racing
64	Morgan Shepherd	Langley Racing	Ford	Sunny King Ford
67	Buddy Arrington	Arrington Racing	Ford	Pannill Sweatshirts
70	J. D. McDuffie	McDuffie Racing	Pontiac	Rumple Furniture
71	Dave Marcis	Marcis Auto Racing	Pontiac	Helen Rae Special
75	Jody Ridley	RahMoc Enterprises	Ford	Nationwise Automotive
81	Chet Fillip (R)	Fillip Racing	Ford	Circle Bar Truck Corral
90	Ken Schrader	Donlavey Racing	Ford	Red Baron Frozen Pizza
92	Jonathan Lee Edwards	Edwards Racing	Chevrolet	Edwards Racing
94	Eddie Bierschwale	Eller Racing	Pontiac	Kodak Film
95	Davey Allison	Sadler Brothers Racing	Chevrolet	Sadler Brothers Racing
98	Ron Bouchard	Curb Racing	Pontiac	Valvoline

== Qualifying ==
Qualifying was split into two rounds. The first round was held on Friday, April 4, at 4:00 pm EST. Each driver would have one lap to set a time. During the first round, the top 15 drivers in the round would be guaranteed a starting spot in the race. If a driver was not able to guarantee a spot in the first round, they had the option to scrub their time from the first round and try and run a faster lap time in a second round qualifying run, held on Saturday, April 5, at 12:30 pm EST. As with the first round, each driver would have one lap to set a time. For this specific race, positions 16-30 would be decided on time, and depending on who needed it, a select amount of positions were given to cars who had not otherwise qualified but were high enough in owner's points; up to two were given.

Geoff Bodine, driving for Hendrick Motorsports, won the pole, setting a time of 16.707 and an average speed of 114.850 miles per hour (184.833 km/h) in the first round.

Six drivers failed to qualify.

=== Full qualifying results ===
Pos.	#	Driver	Team	Make	Time	Speed
1	5	Geoff Bodine	Hendrick Motorsports	Chevrolet	16.707	114.850
2	12	Neil Bonnett	Junior Johnson & Associates	Chevrolet	16.899	113.545
3	25	Tim Richmond	Hendrick Motorsports	Chevrolet	16.906	113.498
4	44	Terry Labonte	Hagan Enterprises	Oldsmobile	16.907	113.491
5	33	Harry Gant	Mach 1 Racing	Chevrolet	16.924	113.377
6	3	Dale Earnhardt	Richard Childress Racing	Chevrolet	16.942	113.257
7	11	Darrell Waltrip	Junior Johnson & Associates	Chevrolet	16.968	113.083
8	15	Ricky Rudd	Bud Moore Engineering	Ford	16.975	113.037
9	26	Joe Ruttman	King Racing	Buick	16.976	113.030
10	22	Bobby Allison	Stavola Brothers Racing	Buick	17.022	112.725
11	43	Richard Petty	Petty Enterprises	Pontiac	17.039	112.612
12	9	Bill Elliott	Melling Racing	Ford	17.064	112.447
13	4	Rick Wilson	Morgan–McClure Motorsports	Oldsmobile	17.064	112.447
14	27	Rusty Wallace	Blue Max Racing	Pontiac	17.064	112.447
15	71	Dave Marcis	Marcis Auto Racing	Chevrolet	17.103	112.191
Failed to lock in the first round
16	8	Bobby Hillin Jr.	Stavola Brothers Racing	Buick	17.107	112.165
17	7	Kyle Petty	Wood Brothers Racing	Ford	17.156	111.844
18	94	Eddie Bierschwale	Eller Racing	Pontiac	17.162	111.805
19	75	Jody Ridley	RahMoc Enterprises	Pontiac	17.174	111.727
20	90	Ken Schrader	Donlavey Racing	Ford	17.201	111.552
21	08	Butch Miller	Throop Racing	Buick	17.213	111.474
22	35	Alan Kulwicki (R)	AK Racing	Ford	17.235	111.332
23	17	Doug Heveron	Hamby Racing	Chevrolet	17.249	111.241
24	23	Michael Waltrip (R)	Bahari Racing	Buick	17.289	110.984
25	81	Chet Fillip (R)	Fillip Racing	Ford	17.340	110.657
26	98	Ron Bouchard	Curb Racing	Pontiac	17.348	110.606
27	41	Ronnie Thomas	Ronnie Thomas Racing	Chevrolet	17.370	110.466
28	18	Tommy Ellis	Freedlander Motorsports	Chevrolet	17.400	110.276
29	95	Davey Allison	Sadler Brothers Racing	Chevrolet	17.471	109.828
30	64	Morgan Shepherd	Langley Racing	Ford	17.536	109.421
Provisionals
31	67	Buddy Arrington	Arrington Racing	Ford	-*	-*
32	6	Trevor Boys	U.S. Racing	Chevrolet	-*	-*
Failed to qualify (results unknown)
33	01	Earle Canavan	Canavan Racing	Pontiac	-*	-*
34	30	Willy T. Ribbs	DiGard Motorsports	Pontiac	-*	-*
35	48	James Hylton	Hylton Motorsports	Chevrolet	-*	-*
36	52	Jimmy Means	Jimmy Means Racing	Pontiac	-*	-*
37	70	J. D. McDuffie	McDuffie Racing	Pontiac	-*	-*
38	92	Jonathan Lee Edwards	Edwards Racing	Chevrolet	-*	-*
Official first round qualifying results
Official starting lineup

== Race results ==
Fin	St	#	Driver	Team	Make	Laps	Led	Status	Pts	Winnings
1	14	27	Rusty Wallace	Blue Max Racing	Pontiac	500	174	running	185	$34,760
2	8	15	Ricky Rudd	Bud Moore Engineering	Ford	500	0	running	170	$20,125
3	7	11	Darrell Waltrip	Junior Johnson & Associates	Chevrolet	500	84	running	170	$17,825
4	5	33	Harry Gant	Mach 1 Racing	Chevrolet	499	0	running	160	$11,770
5	12	9	Bill Elliott	Melling Racing	Ford	499	0	running	155	$12,050
6	10	22	Bobby Allison	Stavola Brothers Racing	Buick	499	2	running	155	$2,900
7	4	44	Terry Labonte	Hagan Enterprises	Oldsmobile	498	47	running	151	$8,250
8	3	25	Tim Richmond	Hendrick Motorsports	Chevrolet	498	0	running	142	$2,550
9	17	7	Kyle Petty	Wood Brothers Racing	Ford	497	0	running	138	$7,750
10	6	3	Dale Earnhardt	Richard Childress Racing	Chevrolet	497	106	running	139	$10,650
11	28	18	Tommy Ellis	Freedlander Motorsports	Chevrolet	496	0	running	130	$1,750
12	13	4	Rick Wilson	Morgan–McClure Motorsports	Oldsmobile	494	0	running	127	$2,100
13	20	90	Ken Schrader	Donlavey Racing	Ford	492	0	running	124	$5,130
14	11	43	Richard Petty	Petty Enterprises	Pontiac	491	0	running	121	$4,760
15	22	35	Alan Kulwicki (R)	AK Racing	Ford	483	0	running	118	$2,000
16	21	08	Butch Miller	Throop Racing	Buick	482	0	running	0	$1,260
17	31	67	Buddy Arrington	Arrington Racing	Ford	477	0	running	112	$4,370
18	32	6	Trevor Boys	U.S. Racing	Chevrolet	466	0	running	109	$4,260
19	9	26	Joe Ruttman	King Racing	Buick	443	0	running	106	$1,140
20	29	95	Davey Allison	Sadler Brothers Racing	Chevrolet	441	0	running	103	$1,350
21	23	17	Doug Heveron	Hamby Racing	Chevrolet	351	0	engine	100	$4,030
22	25	81	Chet Fillip (R)	Fillip Racing	Ford	319	0	engine	97	$1,020
23	19	75	Jody Ridley	RahMoc Enterprises	Pontiac	256	0	engine	94	$3,840
24	1	5	Geoff Bodine	Hendrick Motorsports	Chevrolet	238	23	engine	96	$8,640
25	26	98	Ron Bouchard	Curb Racing	Pontiac	183	0	axle	88	$3,750
26	27	41	Ronnie Thomas	Ronnie Thomas Racing	Chevrolet	157	0	accident	85	$1,370
27	15	71	Dave Marcis	Marcis Auto Racing	Chevrolet	103	0	accident	82	$3,480
28	16	8	Bobby Hillin Jr.	Stavola Brothers Racing	Buick	103	1	accident	84	$3,790
29	18	94	Eddie Bierschwale	Eller Racing	Pontiac	102	0	accident	76	$780
30	2	12	Neil Bonnett	Junior Johnson & Associates	Chevrolet	74	63	accident	78	$8,350
31	30	64	Morgan Shepherd	Langley Racing	Ford	22	0	engine	70	$2,940
32	24	23	Michael Waltrip (R)	Bahari Racing	Buick	22	0	engine	67	$750
Failed to qualify (results unknown)
33		01	Earle Canavan	Canavan Racing	Pontiac					
34		30	Willy T. Ribbs	DiGard Motorsports	Pontiac					
35		48	James Hylton	Hylton Motorsports	Chevrolet					
36		52	Jimmy Means	Jimmy Means Racing	Pontiac					
37		70	J. D. McDuffie	McDuffie Racing	Pontiac					
38		92	Jonathan Lee Edwards	Edwards Racing	Chevrolet					
Official race results

== Standings after the race ==
Drivers' Championship standings

	Pos	Driver	Points
	1	Darrell Waltrip	825
	2	Terry Labonte	794 (-31)
	3	Dale Earnhardt	767 (-58)
1	4	Rusty Wallace	735 (–90)
1	5	Bill Elliott	690 (–135)
2	6	Geoff Bodine	670 (–155)
	7	Kyle Petty	647 (–178)
4	8	Harry Gant	614 (–211)
1	9	Tim Richmond	613 (–212)
1	10	Richard Petty	584 (–241)
Official driver's standings

- Note: Only the first 10 positions are included for the driver standings.

Previous race: 1986 Motorcraft 500	NASCAR Winston Cup Series; 1986 season	Next race: 1986 TranSouth 500
