= 1986 Motorcraft 500 =

Fourth race of the 1986 NASCAR Winston Cup Series

Race details
- Race 4 of 29 in the 1986 NASCAR Winston Cup Series
- The 1986 Motorcraft 500 program cover, featuring Bill Elliott.
- Date: March 16, 1986
- Official name: 27th Annual Motorcraft 500
- Location: Hampton, Georgia, Atlanta International Raceway
- Course: Permanent racing facility
- Course length: 1.522 miles (2.449 km)
- Distance: 328 laps, 499.216 mi (803.41 km)
- Scheduled distance: 328 laps, 499.216 mi (803.41 km)
- Average speed: 132.126 miles per hour (212.636 km/h)
- Attendance: 71,800

Pole position
Driver	Dale Earnhardt	Richard Childress Racing
- Time: 32.096

Most laps led
Driver	Dale Earnhardt	Richard Childress Racing
- Laps: 168

Winner
No. 47	Morgan Shepherd	Race Hill Farm Team

Television in the United States
- Network: ABC
- Announcers: Jim Lampley, Sam Posey

Radio in the United States
- Radio: Motor Racing Network

The 1986 Motorcraft 500 was the fourth stock car race of the 1986 NASCAR Winston Cup Series and the 27th iteration of the event. The race was held on Sunday, March 16, 1986, before an audience of 71,800 in Hampton, Georgia, at Atlanta International Raceway, a 1.522 miles (2.449 km) permanent asphalt quad-oval intermediate speedway.

Faced with a final restart with four laps left in the race, Race Hill Farm Team's Morgan Shepherd managed to hold off the dominant driver of the day, Richard Childress Racing's Dale Earnhardt in what was considered at the time to be a major upset. The victory was Shepherd's second career NASCAR Winston Cup Series victory and his only victory of the season. To fill out the top three, the aforementioned Earnhardt and Hagan Enterprises' Terry Labonte finished second and third, respectively.

== Background ==
The layout of Atlanta International Raceway, the circuit where the race was held.

Atlanta Motor Speedway (formerly Atlanta International Raceway) is a 1.522-mile race track in Hampton, Georgia, United States, 20 miles (32 km) south of Atlanta. It has annually hosted NASCAR Winston Cup Series stock car races since its inauguration in 1960.

The venue was bought by Speedway Motorsports in 1990. In 1994, 46 condominiums were built over the northeastern side of the track. In 1997, to standardize the track with Speedway Motorsports' other two intermediate ovals, the entire track was almost completely rebuilt. The frontstretch and backstretch were swapped, and the configuration of the track was changed from oval to quad-oval, with a new official length of 1.54-mile (2.48 km) where before it was 1.522-mile (2.449 km). The project made the track one of the fastest on the NASCAR circuit.

=== Entry list ===
- (R) - denotes rookie driver.

#	Driver	Team	Make	Sponsor
0	Delma Cowart	H. L. Waters Racing	Chevrolet	Heyward Grooms Construction, Carey Hillard's Restaurants
1	Sterling Marlin	Ellington Racing	Chevrolet	Bull's-Eye Barbecue Sauce
2	Kirk Bryant	Cliff Stewart Racing	Pontiac	Spectrum Furniture
3	Dale Earnhardt	Richard Childress Racing	Chevrolet	Wrangler
4	Rick Wilson	Morgan–McClure Motorsports	Oldsmobile	Cap'n Coty's
5	Geoff Bodine	Hendrick Motorsports	Chevrolet	Levi Garrett
6	Trevor Boys	U.S. Racing	Chevrolet	U.S. Racing
7	Kyle Petty	Wood Brothers Racing	Ford	7-Eleven
8	Bobby Hillin Jr.	Stavola Brothers Racing	Chevrolet	Miller American
9	Bill Elliott	Melling Racing	Ford	Coors
10	Greg Sacks	DiGard Motorsports	Pontiac	TRW Automotive
11	Darrell Waltrip	Junior Johnson & Associates	Chevrolet	Budweiser
12	Neil Bonnett	Junior Johnson & Associates	Chevrolet	Budweiser
14	A. J. Foyt	A. J. Foyt Racing	Oldsmobile	Copenhagen
15	Ricky Rudd	Bud Moore Engineering	Ford	Motorcraft Quality Parts
17	Doug Heveron	Hamby Racing	Chevrolet	Protecta Truck Bed Liner
18	Tommy Ellis	Freedlander Motorsports	Chevrolet	Freedlander Financial
22	Bobby Allison	Stavola Brothers Racing	Buick	Miller American
23	Michael Waltrip (R)	Bahari Racing	Pontiac	Hawaiian Punch
25	Tim Richmond	Hendrick Motorsports	Chevrolet	Folgers
26	Joe Ruttman	King Racing	Buick	Quaker State
27	Rusty Wallace	Blue Max Racing	Pontiac	Alugard
28	Cale Yarborough	Ranier-Lundy Racing	Ford	Hardee's
30	Willy T. Ribbs (Note: Withdrew after Ribbs' car failed to arrive in time for a mandatory technical inspection despite a two-hour extension. According to DiGard Motorsports, the team was stuck trying to repair the car that was supposed to race, which was wrecked by Ribbs during a test on February 27, 1986. The team was also struggling after the departure of master engine builder Robert Yates, who left the team on February 14.)	DiGard Motorsports	Ford	Red Roof Inn
33	Harry Gant	Mach 1 Racing	Chevrolet	Skoal Bandit
35	Alan Kulwicki (R)	AK Racing	Ford	Quincy's Steakhouse
36	H. B. Bailey	Bailey Racing	Pontiac	Almeda Auto Parts
38	Mike Laws	Laws Racing	Chevrolet	Laws Racing
43	Richard Petty	Petty Enterprises	Pontiac	STP
44	Terry Labonte	Hagan Enterprises	Oldsmobile	Piedmont Airlines
47	Morgan Shepherd	Race Hill Farm Team	Chevrolet	Race Hill Farm Team
52	Jimmy Means	Jimmy Means Racing	Pontiac	Jimmy Means Racing
54	Slick Johnson (Note: Driver changed to Eddie Bierschwale for the start of the race after Bierschwale and Kodak paid Johnson to drive Johnson's car when Bierschwale failed to qualify. Johnson later switched seats with Bierschwale during the race. As Bierschwale started the race, he is classified as the driver in the official results.)	Gray Racing	Chevrolet	Gray Racing
55	Benny Parsons	Jackson Bros. Motorsports	Oldsmobile	Copenhagen
57	Jody Ridley	RahMoc Enterprises	Ford	Nationwise Automotive
64	Pancho Carter	Langley Racing	Ford	Kmart
65	Joe Booher	Booher Racing	Buick	Booher Racing
66	Phil Parsons	Jackson Bros. Motorsports	Oldsmobile	Skoal
67	Buddy Arrington	Arrington Racing	Ford	Pannill Sweatshirts
71	Dave Marcis	Marcis Auto Racing	Pontiac	Helen Rae Special
74	Bobby Wawak	Wawak Racing	Chevrolet	Superior Piping
75	Lake Speed	RahMoc Enterprises	Pontiac	Nationwise Automotive
81	Chet Fillip (R)	Fillip Racing	Ford	Circle Bar Truck Corral
82	Mark Stahl	Stahl Racing	Ford	Auto Bell Car Wash
88	Buddy Baker	Baker–Schiff Racing	Oldsmobile	Crisco
90	Ken Schrader	Donlavey Racing	Ford	Red Baron Frozen Pizza
91	David Sosebee	Sosebee Racing	Chevrolet	Sosebee Racing
94	Eddie Bierschwale	Eller Racing	Pontiac	Kodak Film
98	Ron Bouchard	Curb Racing	Pontiac	Valvoline

== Qualifying ==
Qualifying was originally scheduled to be split into two rounds. The first round was scheduled to be held on Friday, March 14, at 1:00 PM EST. Originally, the first 20 positions were going to be determined by first round qualifying, with positions 21-40 meant to be determined later in the day at 2:00 PM EST. However, due to rain, the first round was cancelled. As a result, qualifying was both delayed for over two hours and condensed into one round for all starting grid spots in the race. Depending on who needed it, a select amount of positions were given to cars who had not otherwise qualified but were high enough in owner's points; up to two were given.

Dale Earnhardt, driving for Richard Childress Racing, won the pole, setting a time of 32.096 and an average speed of 170.713 miles per hour (274.736 km/h).

Six drivers failed to qualify.

=== Full qualifying results ===
Pos.	#	Driver	Team	Make	Time	Speed
1	3	Dale Earnhardt	Richard Childress Racing	Chevrolet	32.096	170.713
2	25	Tim Richmond	Hendrick Motorsports	Chevrolet	32.198	170.172
3	47	Morgan Shepherd	Race Hill Farm Team	Buick	32.260	169.845
4	10	Greg Sacks	DiGard Motorsports	Chevrolet	32.290	169.687
5	9	Bill Elliott	Melling Racing	Ford	32.317	169.545
6	28	Cale Yarborough	Ranier-Lundy Racing	Ford	32.373	169.252
7	27	Rusty Wallace	Blue Max Racing	Pontiac	32.382	169.205
8	5	Geoff Bodine	Hendrick Motorsports	Chevrolet	32.393	169.148
9	1	Sterling Marlin	Ellington Racing	Chevrolet	32.399	169.116
10	33	Harry Gant	Mach 1 Racing	Chevrolet	32.422	168.996
11	43	Richard Petty	Petty Enterprises	Pontiac	32.431	168.949
12	44	Terry Labonte	Hagan Enterprises	Oldsmobile	32.464	168.778
13	4	Rick Wilson	Morgan–McClure Motorsports	Oldsmobile	32.474	168.726
14	88	Buddy Baker	Baker–Schiff Racing	Oldsmobile	32.494	168.622
15	11	Darrell Waltrip	Junior Johnson & Associates	Chevrolet	32.521	168.482
16	55	Benny Parsons	Jackson Bros. Motorsports	Oldsmobile	32.545	168.358
17	22	Bobby Allison	Stavola Brothers Racing	Buick	32.653	167.801
18	66	Phil Parsons	Jackson Bros. Motorsports	Oldsmobile	32.670	167.713
19	12	Neil Bonnett	Junior Johnson & Associates	Chevrolet	32.837	166.861
20	57	Jody Ridley	RahMoc Enterprises	Ford	32.852	166.784
21	75	Lake Speed	RahMoc Enterprises	Pontiac	32.860	166.744
22	14	A. J. Foyt	A. J. Foyt Racing	Oldsmobile	32.954	166.268
23	15	Ricky Rudd	Bud Moore Engineering	Ford	32.981	166.132
24	90	Ken Schrader	Donlavey Racing	Ford	33.052	165.775
25	98	Ron Bouchard	Curb Racing	Pontiac	33.055	165.760
26	71	Dave Marcis	Marcis Auto Racing	Pontiac	33.077	165.650
27	67	Buddy Arrington	Arrington Racing	Ford	33.081	165.630
28	26	Joe Ruttman	King Racing	Buick	33.154	165.265
29	64	Pancho Carter	Langley Racing	Ford	33.163	165.220
30	2	Kirk Bryant	Cliff Stewart Racing	Pontiac	33.206	165.006
31	23	Michael Waltrip (R)	Bahari Racing	Pontiac	33.277	164.654
32	35	Alan Kulwicki (R)	AK Racing	Ford	33.319	164.446
33	81	Chet Fillip (R)	Fillip Racing	Ford	33.504	163.539
34	52	Jimmy Means	Jimmy Means Racing	Pontiac	33.516	163.480
35	17	Doug Heveron	Hamby Racing	Chevrolet	33.572	163.207
36	36	H. B. Bailey	Bailey Racing	Pontiac	33.592	163.110
37	54	Eddie Bierschwale	Gray Racing	Chevrolet	33.598	163.081
38	7	Kyle Petty	Wood Brothers Racing	Ford	33.646	162.848
39	6	Trevor Boys	U.S. Racing	Chevrolet	33.740	162.395
40	74	Bobby Wawak	Wawak Racing	Chevrolet	33.788	162.164
Provisionals
41	8	Bobby Hillin Jr.	Stavola Brothers Racing	Buick	-*	-*
42	18	Tommy Ellis	Freedlander Motorsports	Chevrolet	-*	-*
Failed to qualify or withdrew
43	94	Eddie Bierschwale	Eller Racing	Pontiac	-*	-*
44	65	Joe Booher	Booher Racing	Buick	-*	-*
45	0	Delma Cowart	H. L. Waters Racing	Chevrolet	-*	-*
46	38	Mike Laws	Laws Racing	Chevrolet	-*	-*
47	91	David Sosebee	Sosebee Racing	Chevrolet	-*	-*
48	82	Mark Stahl	Stahl Racing	Ford	-*	-*
WD	30	Willy T. Ribbs	DiGard Motorsports	Ford	-	-
Official starting lineup

== Race results ==
Fin	St	#	Driver	Team	Make	Laps	Led	Status	Pts	Winnings
1	3	47	Morgan Shepherd	Race Hill Farm Team	Buick	328	97	running	180	$62,350
2	1	3	Dale Earnhardt	Richard Childress Racing	Chevrolet	328	168	running	180	$51,300
3	12	44	Terry Labonte	Hagan Enterprises	Oldsmobile	328	0	running	165	$22,150
4	15	11	Darrell Waltrip	Junior Johnson & Associates	Chevrolet	328	6	running	165	$24,075
5	5	9	Bill Elliott	Melling Racing	Ford	328	2	running	160	$18,250
6	16	55	Benny Parsons	Jackson Bros. Motorsports	Oldsmobile	328	0	running	150	$6,675
7	2	25	Tim Richmond	Hendrick Motorsports	Chevrolet	328	19	running	151	$5,925
8	7	27	Rusty Wallace	Blue Max Racing	Pontiac	327	0	running	142	$12,930
9	17	22	Bobby Allison	Stavola Brothers Racing	Buick	327	0	running	138	$4,725
10	8	5	Geoff Bodine	Hendrick Motorsports	Chevrolet	327	0	running	134	$12,775
11	11	43	Richard Petty	Petty Enterprises	Pontiac	327	2	running	135	$8,220
12	10	33	Harry Gant	Mach 1 Racing	Chevrolet	326	34	running	132	$17,025
13	42	18	Tommy Ellis	Freedlander Motorsports	Chevrolet	326	0	running	124	$3,225
14	32	35	Alan Kulwicki (R)	AK Racing	Ford	325	0	running	121	$3,525
15	14	88	Buddy Baker	Baker–Schiff Racing	Oldsmobile	325	0	running	118	$3,165
16	41	8	Bobby Hillin Jr.	Stavola Brothers Racing	Buick	324	0	running	115	$6,900
17	22	14	A. J. Foyt	A. J. Foyt Racing	Oldsmobile	322	0	running	112	$2,600
18	18	66	Phil Parsons	Jackson Bros. Motorsports	Oldsmobile	322	0	running	109	$2,475
19	31	23	Michael Waltrip (R)	Bahari Racing	Pontiac	319	0	running	106	$2,775
20	27	67	Buddy Arrington	Arrington Racing	Ford	317	0	running	103	$6,415
21	24	90	Ken Schrader	Donlavey Racing	Ford	314	0	accident	100	$7,580
22	21	75	Lake Speed	RahMoc Enterprises	Pontiac	313	0	running	97	$5,860
23	40	74	Bobby Wawak	Wawak Racing	Chevrolet	308	0	running	94	$1,925
24	39	6	Trevor Boys	U.S. Racing	Chevrolet	303	0	running	91	$5,500
25	4	10	Greg Sacks	DiGard Motorsports	Chevrolet	301	0	running	88	$8,825
26	23	15	Ricky Rudd	Bud Moore Engineering	Ford	301	0	running	85	$9,695
27	6	28	Cale Yarborough	Ranier-Lundy Racing	Ford	300	0	oil line	82	$1,665
28	38	7	Kyle Petty	Wood Brothers Racing	Ford	289	0	running	79	$8,635
29	20	57	Jody Ridley	RahMoc Enterprises	Ford	268	0	valve	76	$1,605
30	37	54	Eddie Bierschwale	Gray Racing	Chevrolet	261	0	accident	73	$1,575
31	30	2	Kirk Bryant	Cliff Stewart Racing	Pontiac	254	0	accident	70	$5,465
32	9	1	Sterling Marlin	Ellington Racing	Chevrolet	220	0	valve	67	$1,525
33	26	71	Dave Marcis	Marcis Auto Racing	Pontiac	219	0	engine	64	$4,705
34	19	12	Neil Bonnett	Junior Johnson & Associates	Chevrolet	206	0	accident	61	$9,880
35	35	17	Doug Heveron	Hamby Racing	Chevrolet	182	0	running	58	$4,510
36	33	81	Chet Fillip (R)	Fillip Racing	Ford	175	0	valve	55	$1,450
37	36	36	H. B. Bailey	Bailey Racing	Pontiac	174	0	steering	52	$1,435
38	29	64	Pancho Carter	Langley Racing	Ford	157	0	clutch	49	$4,195
39	13	4	Rick Wilson	Morgan–McClure Motorsports	Oldsmobile	149	0	valve	46	$1,405
40	25	98	Ron Bouchard	Curb Racing	Pontiac	140	0	clutch	43	$4,155
41	34	52	Jimmy Means	Jimmy Means Racing	Pontiac	82	0	accident	40	$4,145
42	28	26	Joe Ruttman	King Racing	Buick	33	0	engine	37	$1,390
Failed to qualify or withdrew
43		94	Eddie Bierschwale	Eller Racing	Pontiac					
44		65	Joe Booher	Booher Racing	Buick					
45		0	Delma Cowart	H. L. Waters Racing	Chevrolet					
46		38	Mike Laws	Laws Racing	Chevrolet					
47		91	David Sosebee	Sosebee Racing	Chevrolet					
48		82	Mark Stahl	Stahl Racing	Ford					
WD		30	Willy T. Ribbs	DiGard Motorsports	Ford					
Official race results

== Standings after the race ==
Drivers' Championship standings

	Pos	Driver	Points
	1	Darrell Waltrip	655
	2	Terry Labonte	643 (-12)
	3	Dale Earnhardt	628 (-27)
	4	Geoff Bodine	574 (–81)
1	5	Rusty Wallace	550 (–105)
3	6	Bill Elliott	535 (–120)
2	7	Kyle Petty	509 (–146)
1	8	Lake Speed	482 (–173)
1	9	Bobby Hillin Jr.	476 (–179)
6	10	Tim Richmond	471 (–184)
Official driver's standings

- Note: Only the first 10 positions are included for the driver standings.

== Notes ==
Previous race: 1986 Goodwrench 500	NASCAR Winston Cup Series; 1986 season	Next race: 1986 Valleydale 500
