= 1986 Miller High Life 400 =

Second race of the 1986 NASCAR Winston Cup Series

Race details
- Race 2 of 29 in the 1986 NASCAR Winston Cup Series
- The 1986 Miller High Life 400 program cover, featuring Dale Earnhardt.
- Date: February 23, 1986
- Official name: 32nd Annual Miller High Life 400
- Location: Richmond, Virginia, Richmond Fairgrounds Raceway
- Course: Permanent racing facility
- Course length: 0.542 miles (0.872 km)
- Distance: 400 laps, 216.8 mi (348.905 km)
- Average speed: 71.078 miles per hour (114.389 km/h)
- Attendance: 30,000

Pole position
Driver	Geoff Bodine	Hendrick Motorsports
- Time: Set by 1986 owner's points

Most laps led
Driver	Dale Earnhardt	Richard Childress Racing
- Laps: 299

Winner
No. 7	Kyle Petty	Wood Brothers Racing

Television in the United States
- Network: TBS
- Announcers: Ken Squier, Benny Parsons

Radio in the United States
- Radio: Motor Racing Network

The 1986 Miller High Life 400 was the second stock car race of the 1986 NASCAR Winston Cup Series and the 32nd iteration of the event. The race was held on Sunday, February 23, 1986, before an audience of 30,000 in Richmond, Virginia, at Richmond Fairgrounds Raceway, a 0.542 miles (0.872 km) D-shaped oval. The race took the scheduled 400 laps to complete.

In what is considered to be one of the most controversial finishes in NASCAR history, Junior Johnson & Associates' Darrell Waltrip and Richard Childress Racing's Dale Earnhardt engaged in a battle for the victory. With four laps left, Waltrip made a pass on Earnhardt in the second turn, passing him on the left. However, Waltrip did not fully clear Earnhardt by the third turn. In the third turn, Earnhardt spun out Waltrip, sending the two into a crash that included numerous other cars behind them. As a result, the next driver behind the two who managed to avoid the wreck, Wood Brothers Racing's Kyle Petty, was declared the winner in improbable fashion. The victory was Petty's first career NASCAR Winston Cup Series victory and his only victory of the season. To fill out the top three, King Racing's Joe Ruttman and the aforementioned Earnhardt finished second and third, respectively.

== Background ==
Richmond International Raceway (RIR) is a 3/4-mile (1.2 km), D-shaped, asphalt race track located just outside Richmond, Virginia in Henrico County. It hosts the Monster Energy NASCAR Cup Series and Xfinity Series. Known as "America's premier short track", it formerly hosted a NASCAR Camping World Truck Series race, an IndyCar Series race, and two USAC sprint car races.

=== Entry list ===
- (R) denotes rookie driver.

#	Driver	Team	Make	Sponsor
2	Kirk Bryant	Cliff Stewart Racing	Pontiac	Spectrum Furniture
3	Dale Earnhardt	Richard Childress Racing	Chevrolet	Wrangler
5	Geoff Bodine	Hendrick Motorsports	Chevrolet	Levi Garrett
6	Trevor Boys	U.S. Racing	Chevrolet	U.S. Racing
7	Kyle Petty	Wood Brothers Racing	Ford	7-Eleven
8	Bobby Hillin Jr.	Stavola Brothers Racing	Buick	Miller American
9	Bill Elliott	Melling Racing	Ford	Coors
10	Greg Sacks	DiGard Motorsports	Pontiac	TRW Automotive
11	Darrell Waltrip	Junior Johnson & Associates	Chevrolet	Budweiser
12	Neil Bonnett	Junior Johnson & Associates	Chevrolet	Budweiser
15	Ricky Rudd	Bud Moore Engineering	Ford	Motorcraft Quality Parts
17	Phil Parsons	Hamby Racing	Chevrolet	Skoal
18	Tommy Ellis	Freedlander Motorsports	Chevrolet	Freedlander Financial
22	Bobby Allison	Stavola Brothers Racing	Buick	Miller American
23	Michael Waltrip (R)	Bahari Racing	Pontiac	Hawaiian Punch
25	Tim Richmond	Hendrick Motorsports	Chevrolet	Folgers
26	Joe Ruttman	King Racing	Buick	Quaker State
27	Rusty Wallace	Blue Max Racing	Pontiac	Alugard
32	Alan Kulwicki (R)	Terry Racing	Ford	Quincy's Steakhouse
33	Harry Gant	Mach 1 Racing	Chevrolet	Skoal Bandit
41	Ronnie Thomas	Ronnie Thomas Racing	Chevrolet	Ronnie Thomas Racing
43	Richard Petty	Petty Enterprises	Pontiac	STP
44	Terry Labonte	Hagan Enterprises	Oldsmobile	Piedmont Airlines
48	Ron Esau (Note: Driver changed to Eddie Bierschwale for the race after Bierschwale and Kodak paid owner James Hylton to drive Esau's car. Bierschwale had failed to qualify with a lack of owner's points.)	Hylton Motorsports	Chevrolet	Hylton Motorsports
52	Jimmy Means	Jimmy Means Racing	Pontiac	Jimmy Means Racing
64	Doug Heveron	Langley Racing	Ford	Hesco Exhaust Systems
67	Buddy Arrington	Arrington Racing	Ford	Pannill Sweatshirts
70	J. D. McDuffie	McDuffie Racing	Pontiac	Rumple Furniture
71	Dave Marcis	Marcis Auto Racing	Pontiac	Helen Rae Special
75	Lake Speed	RahMoc Enterprises	Pontiac	Nationwise Automotive
90	Ken Schrader	Donlavey Racing	Ford	Red Baron Frozen Pizza
92	Jonathan Lee Edwards	Edwards Racing	Buick	Edwards Racing
94	Eddie Bierschwale	Eller Racing	Pontiac	Kodak Film
95	Davey Allison	Sadler Brothers Racing	Chevrolet	Sadler Brothers Racing
98	Ron Bouchard	Curb Racing	Pontiac	Valvoline

== Qualifying ==
Qualifying was scheduled to be split into two rounds, with the first round scheduled to be held on Friday, February 21, at 3:00 PM EST, and the second round scheduled to be held on Saturday, February 22, at 11:30 AM EST. The first round would have set positions 1-20, while the second round would have set positions 21-30 for drivers who had not locked in during the first round. However, the first round was immediately cancelled due to mist. The second round was then attempted to be run, but was then also cancelled after 23 cars made runs due to rain.

As a result of qualifying being cancelled, the starting lineup was set by a rained-out procedure. Positions 1-18 were given based on the current 1986 owner's points, positions 19-20 were given to winners in the 1985 NASCAR Winston Cup Series who had not qualified by owner's points, and positions 21-30 were given to the teams who had both had their entry blanks received by NASCAR and had checked in at the NASCAR on-track check-in hauler the earliest. In addition, one provisional was given out of the maximum two allowable. As a result of this system, Hendrick Motorsports' Geoff Bodine won the pole. Four drivers failed to qualify.

=== Full starting lineup ===
Pos.	#	Driver	Team	Make
1	5	Geoff Bodine	Hendrick Motorsports	Chevrolet
2	44	Terry Labonte	Hagan Enterprises	Oldsmobile
3	11	Darrell Waltrip	Junior Johnson & Associates	Chevrolet
4	8	Bobby Hillin Jr.	Stavola Brothers Racing	Buick
5	98	Ron Bouchard	Curb Racing	Pontiac
6	27	Rusty Wallace	Blue Max Racing	Pontiac
7	75	Lake Speed	RahMoc Enterprises	Pontiac
8	15	Ricky Rudd	Bud Moore Engineering	Ford
9	9	Bill Elliott	Melling Racing	Ford
10	3	Dale Earnhardt	Richard Childress Racing	Chevrolet
11	17	Phil Parsons	Hamby Racing	Oldsmobile
12	7	Kyle Petty	Wood Brothers Racing	Ford
13	18	Tommy Ellis	Freedlander Motorsports	Chevrolet
14	6	Trevor Boys	U.S. Racing	Buick
15	25	Tim Richmond	Hendrick Motorsports	Chevrolet
16	67	Buddy Arrington	Arrington Racing	Ford
17	26	Joe Ruttman	King Racing	Buick
18	33	Harry Gant	Mach 1 Racing	Chevrolet
Qualified via winning in the 1985 season
19	12	Neil Bonnett	Junior Johnson & Associates	Chevrolet
20	10	Greg Sacks	DiGard Motorsports	Pontiac
Qualified via earliest entry blank and check in at the NASCAR hauler
21	23	Michael Waltrip (R)	Bahari Racing	Pontiac
22	64	Doug Heveron	Langley Racing	Ford
23	22	Bobby Allison	Stavola Brothers Racing	Buick
24	71	Dave Marcis	Marcis Auto Racing	Chevrolet
25	2	Kirk Bryant	Cliff Stewart Racing	Pontiac
26	70	J. D. McDuffie	McDuffie Racing	Pontiac
27	43	Richard Petty	Petty Enterprises	Pontiac
28	95	Davey Allison	Sadler Brothers Racing	Chevrolet
29	90	Ken Schrader	Donlavey Racing	Ford
30	52	Jimmy Means	Jimmy Means Racing	Pontiac
Provisional
31	48	Ron Esau	Hylton Motorsports	Chevrolet
Failed to qualify
32	32	Alan Kulwicki (R)	Terry Racing	Ford
33	41	Ronnie Thomas	Ronnie Thomas Racing	Chevrolet
34	92	Jonathan Lee Edwards	Edwards Racing	Buick
35	94	Eddie Bierschwale	Eller Racing	Pontiac
Official starting lineup

== Race results ==
Fin	St	#	Driver	Team	Make	Laps	Led	Status	Pts	Winnings
1	12	7	Kyle Petty	Wood Brothers Racing	Ford	400	4	running	180	$37,880
2	17	26	Joe Ruttman	King Racing	Buick	400	21	running	175	$16,215
3	10	3	Dale Earnhardt	Richard Childress Racing	Chevrolet	400	299	running	175	$19,310
4	23	22	Bobby Allison	Stavola Brothers Racing	Buick	399	0	running	160	$6,275
5	3	11	Darrell Waltrip	Junior Johnson & Associates	Chevrolet	398	1	crash	160	$14,295
6	4	8	Bobby Hillin Jr.	Stavola Brothers Racing	Buick	398	0	running	150	$7,240
7	19	12	Neil Bonnett	Junior Johnson & Associates	Chevrolet	398	0	running	146	$10,055
8	1	5	Geoff Bodine	Hendrick Motorsports	Chevrolet	397	59	crash	147	$8,435
9	24	71	Dave Marcis	Marcis Auto Racing	Chevrolet	397	12	running	143	$5,890
10	6	27	Rusty Wallace	Blue Max Racing	Pontiac	395	1	running	139	$6,530
11	30	52	Jimmy Means	Jimmy Means Racing	Pontiac	395	3	running	135	$6,510
12	28	95	Davey Allison	Sadler Brothers Racing	Chevrolet	395	0	running	127	$1,860
13	22	64	Doug Heveron	Langley Racing	Ford	391	0	running	0	$4,760
14	16	67	Buddy Arrington	Arrington Racing	Ford	389	0	running	121	$4,580
15	2	44	Terry Labonte	Hagan Enterprises	Oldsmobile	389	0	running	118	$7,550
16	26	70	J. D. McDuffie	McDuffie Racing	Pontiac	387	0	running	115	$4,325
17	7	75	Lake Speed	RahMoc Enterprises	Pontiac	382	0	running	112	$4,145
18	5	98	Ron Bouchard	Curb Racing	Pontiac	380	0	running	109	$3,915
19	20	10	Greg Sacks	DiGard Motorsports	Pontiac	369	0	running	106	$7,100
20	27	43	Richard Petty	Petty Enterprises	Pontiac	363	0	running	103	$1,615
21	9	9	Bill Elliott	Melling Racing	Ford	353	0	running	100	$9,730
22	15	25	Tim Richmond	Hendrick Motorsports	Chevrolet	352	0	running	97	$1,295
23	29	90	Ken Schrader	Donlavey Racing	Ford	329	0	running	94	$4,450
24	13	18	Tommy Ellis	Freedlander Motorsports	Chevrolet	317	0	running	91	$1,225
25	21	23	Michael Waltrip (R)	Bahari Racing	Pontiac	313	0	head gasket	88	$1,790
26	14	6	Trevor Boys	U.S. Racing	Buick	279	0	crash	85	$3,335
27	25	2	Kirk Bryant	Cliff Stewart Racing	Pontiac	88	0	crash	82	$3,300
28	18	33	Harry Gant	Mach 1 Racing	Chevrolet	29	0	overheating	79	$8,385
29	11	17	Phil Parsons	Hamby Racing	Oldsmobile	17	0	crash	76	$3,210
30	8	15	Ricky Rudd	Bud Moore Engineering	Ford	17	0	crash	73	$7,715
31	31	48	Eddie Bierschwale	Hylton Motorsports	Chevrolet	2	0	engine	70	$2,515
Failed to qualify
32		32	Alan Kulwicki (R)	Terry Racing	Ford					
33		41	Ronnie Thomas	Ronnie Thomas Racing	Chevrolet					
34		92	Jonathan Lee Edwards	Edwards Racing	Buick					
35		94	Eddie Bierschwale	Eller Racing	Pontiac					
Official race results

== Standings after the race ==
Drivers' Championship standings

	Pos	Driver	Points
	1	Geoff Bodine	332
1	2	Darrell Waltrip	330 (-2)
1	3	Bobby Hillin Jr.	315 (-17)
10	4	Dale Earnhardt	301 (–31)
11	5	Kyle Petty	295 (–37)
5	6	Terry Labonte	293 (–39)
2	7	Rusty Wallace	281 (–51)
2	8	Ron Bouchard	259 (–73)
20	9	Joe Ruttman	254 (–78)
	10	Lake Speed	246 (–86)
Official driver's standings

- Note: Only the first 10 positions are included for the driver standings.

== Notes ==
Previous race: 1986 Daytona 500	NASCAR Winston Cup Series; 1986 season	Next race: 1986 Goodwrench 500
