= 1986 Goodwrench 500 =

Third race of the 1986 NASCAR Winston Cup Series

Race details
- Race 3 of 29 in the 1986 NASCAR Winston Cup Series
- The 1986 GM Goodwrench 500 program cover, featuring Dale Earnhardt.
- Date: March 2, 1986
- Official name: 21st Annual Goodwrench 500
- Location: Rockingham, North Carolina, North Carolina Motor Speedway
- Course: Permanent racing facility
- Course length: 1.017 miles (1.637 km)
- Distance: 492 laps, 500.364 mi (805.257 km)
- Average speed: 120.488 miles per hour (193.907 km/h)
- Attendance: 47,500

Pole position
Driver	Terry Labonte	Hagan Enterprises
- Time: 25.017

Most laps led
Driver	Terry Labonte	Hagan Enterprises
- Laps: 306

Winner
No. 44	Terry Labonte	Hagan Enterprises

Television in the United States
- Network: SETN
- Announcers: Mike Joy, Benny Parsons

Radio in the United States
- Radio: Motor Racing Network

The 1986 Goodwrench 500 was the third stock car race of the 1986 NASCAR Winston Cup Series season and the 21st iteration of the event. The race was held on Sunday, March 2, 1986, before an audience of 47,500 in Rockingham, North Carolina, at North Carolina Motor Speedway, a 1.017 miles (1.637 km) permanent high-banked racetrack. The race took the scheduled 492 laps to complete.

By race's end, Hagan Enterprises' Terry Labonte managed to dominate a majority of the race, leading 306 laps and defending a late race charge by Mach 1 Racing's Harry Gant to take his fifth career NASCAR Winston Cup Series victory and his only victory of the season. To fill out the top three, the aforementioned Harry Gant and owner-driver Richard Petty finished second and third, respectively.

== Background ==
The layout of North Carolina Motor Speedway, the venue where the race was held.

North Carolina Motor Speedway was opened as a flat, one-mile oval on October 31, 1965. In 1969, the track was extensively reconfigured to a high-banked, D-shaped oval just over one mile in length. In 1997, North Carolina Motor Speedway merged with Penske Motorsports, and was renamed North Carolina Speedway. Shortly thereafter, the infield was reconfigured, and competition on the infield road course, mostly by the SCCA, was discontinued. Currently, the track is home to the Fast Track High Performance Driving School.

=== Entry list ===
- (R) denotes rookie driver.

#	Driver	Team	Make
01	Earle Canavan	Canavan Racing	Pontiac
2	Kirk Bryant	Cliff Stewart Racing	Pontiac
3	Dale Earnhardt	Richard Childress Racing	Chevrolet
5	Geoff Bodine	Hendrick Motorsports	Chevrolet
6	Trevor Boys	U.S. Racing	Chevrolet
7	Kyle Petty	Wood Brothers Racing	Ford
8	Bobby Hillin Jr.	Stavola Brothers Racing	Buick
9	Bill Elliott	Melling Racing	Ford
10	Greg Sacks	DiGard Motorsports	Pontiac
11	Darrell Waltrip	Junior Johnson & Associates	Chevrolet
12	Neil Bonnett	Junior Johnson & Associates	Chevrolet
15	Ricky Rudd	Bud Moore Engineering	Ford
17	Phil Parsons	Hamby Racing	Chevrolet
18	Tommy Ellis	Freedlander Motorsports	Chevrolet
20	Rick Newsom	Newsom Racing	Buick
22	Bobby Allison	Stavola Brothers Racing	Buick
23	Michael Waltrip (R)	Bahari Racing	Pontiac
25	Tim Richmond	Hendrick Motorsports	Chevrolet
26	Joe Ruttman	King Racing	Buick
27	Rusty Wallace	Blue Max Racing	Pontiac
28	Cale Yarborough	Ranier-Lundy Racing	Ford
32	Alan Kulwicki (R)	Terry Racing	Ford
33	Harry Gant	Mach 1 Racing	Chevrolet
41	Ronnie Thomas	Ronnie Thomas Racing	Chevrolet
43	Richard Petty	Petty Enterprises	Pontiac
44	Terry Labonte	Hagan Enterprises	Oldsmobile
47	Morgan Shepherd	Race Hill Farm Team	Buick
48	Wayne Slark	Hylton Motorsports	Chevrolet
52	Jimmy Means	Jimmy Means Racing	Pontiac
64	Pancho Carter	Langley Racing	Ford
67	Buddy Arrington	Arrington Racing	Ford
70	J. D. McDuffie	McDuffie Racing	Pontiac
71	Dave Marcis	Marcis Auto Racing	Pontiac
74	Bobby Wawak	Wawak Racing	Chevrolet
75	Lake Speed	RahMoc Enterprises	Pontiac
90	Ken Schrader	Donlavey Racing	Ford
92	Jonathan Lee Edwards	Edwards Racing	Buick
94	Eddie Bierschwale	Eller Racing	Pontiac
95	Davey Allison	Sadler Brothers Racing	Chevrolet
98	Ron Bouchard	Curb Racing	Pontiac

== Qualifying ==
Qualifying was split into two rounds. The first round was held on Thursday, February 27, at 2:30 PM EST. Each driver had one lap to set a time. During the first round, the top 20 drivers in the round were guaranteed a starting spot in the race. If a driver was not able to guarantee a spot in the first round, they had the option to scrub their time from the first round and try and run a faster lap time in a second round qualifying run, held on Friday, February 28, at 2:00 PM EST. As with the first round, each driver had one lap to set a time. For this specific race, positions 21-30 were decided on time, and depending on who needed it, a select amount of positions were given to cars who had not otherwise qualified but were high enough in owner's points in the previous season; up to two were given.

Terry Labonte, driving for Hagan Enterprises, managed to win the pole, setting a time of 25.017 and an average speed of 146.348 mph (235.524 km/h) in the first round.

No drivers failed to qualify.

=== Full qualifying results ===
Pos.	#	Driver	Team	Make	Time	Speed
1	44	Terry Labonte	Hagan Enterprises	Oldsmobile	25.017	146.348
2	25	Tim Richmond	Hendrick Motorsports	Chevrolet	25.117	145.766
3	5	Geoff Bodine	Hendrick Motorsports	Chevrolet	25.264	144.918
4	11	Darrell Waltrip	Junior Johnson & Associates	Chevrolet	25.310	144.654
5	3	Dale Earnhardt	Richard Childress Racing	Chevrolet	25.337	144.500
6	22	Bobby Allison	Stavola Brothers Racing	Buick	25.401	144.136
7	33	Harry Gant	Mach 1 Racing	Chevrolet	25.420	144.028
8	90	Ken Schrader	Donlavey Racing	Ford	25.493	143.616
9	9	Bill Elliott	Melling Racing	Ford	25.532	143.397
10	28	Cale Yarborough	Ranier-Lundy Racing	Ford	25.554	143.273
11	71	Dave Marcis	Marcis Auto Racing	Chevrolet	25.574	143.161
12	7	Kyle Petty	Wood Brothers Racing	Ford	25.611	142.954
13	43	Richard Petty	Petty Enterprises	Pontiac	25.627	142.865
14	15	Ricky Rudd	Bud Moore Engineering	Ford	25.677	142.587
15	75	Lake Speed	RahMoc Enterprises	Pontiac	25.699	142.465
16	18	Tommy Ellis	Freedlander Motorsports	Chevrolet	25.706	142.426
17	23	Michael Waltrip (R)	Bahari Racing	Pontiac	25.796	141.929
18	12	Neil Bonnett	Junior Johnson & Associates	Chevrolet	25.822	141.786
19	2	Kirk Bryant	Cliff Stewart Racing	Pontiac	25.908	141.315
20	27	Rusty Wallace	Blue Max Racing	Pontiac	25.926	141.217
Failed to lock in Round 1
21	26	Joe Ruttman	King Racing	Buick	25.367	144.329
22	47	Morgan Shepherd	Race Hill Farm Team	Buick	25.373	144.295
23	10	Greg Sacks	DiGard Motorsports	Pontiac	25.572	143.172
24	8	Bobby Hillin Jr.	Stavola Brothers Racing	Buick	25.649	142.742
25	94	Eddie Bierschwale	Eller Racing	Pontiac	25.839	141.693
26	95	Davey Allison	Sadler Brothers Racing	Chevrolet	25.946	141.108
27	32	Alan Kulwicki (R)	Terry Racing	Ford	26.041	140.594
28	17	Phil Parsons	Hamby Racing	Oldsmobile	26.120	140.168
29	64	Pancho Carter	Langley Racing	Ford	26.197	139.756
30	98	Ron Bouchard	Curb Racing	Buick	26.200	139.740
31	6	Trevor Boys	U.S. Racing	Chevrolet	26.376	138.810
32	74	Bobby Wawak	Wawak Racing	Chevrolet	26.505	138.132
33	52	Jimmy Means	Jimmy Means Racing	Pontiac	26.507	138.122
34	67	Buddy Arrington	Arrington Racing	Ford	26.529	138.007
35	01	Earle Canavan	Canavan Racing	Pontiac	26.687	137.190
36	92	Jonathan Lee Edwards	Edwards Racing	Chevrolet	26.755	136.842
37	41	Ronnie Thomas	Ronnie Thomas Racing	Chevrolet	26.808	136.571
38	70	J. D. McDuffie	McDuffie Racing	Pontiac	26.898	136.114
39	48	Wayne Slark	Hylton Motorsports	Chevrolet	26.972	135.741
40	20	Rick Newsom	Newsom Racing	Buick	27.039	135.404
Official first round qualifying results
Official starting lineup

== Race results ==
Fin	St	#	Driver	Team	Make	Laps	Led	Status	Pts	Winnings
1	1	44	Terry Labonte	Hagan Enterprises	Oldsmobile	492	306	running	185	$44,550
2	7	33	Harry Gant	Mach 1 Racing	Chevrolet	492	0	running	170	$28,110
3	13	43	Richard Petty	Petty Enterprises	Pontiac	492	59	running	170	$15,970
4	22	47	Morgan Shepherd	Race Hill Farm Team	Buick	491	0	running	160	$9,255
5	4	11	Darrell Waltrip	Junior Johnson & Associates	Chevrolet	491	1	running	160	$18,615
6	10	28	Cale Yarborough	Ranier-Lundy Racing	Ford	490	0	running	150	$5,410
7	9	9	Bill Elliott	Melling Racing	Ford	490	0	running	146	$15,560
8	5	3	Dale Earnhardt	Richard Childress Racing	Chevrolet	490	69	running	147	$19,510
9	18	12	Neil Bonnett	Junior Johnson & Associates	Chevrolet	490	2	running	143	$12,710
10	15	75	Lake Speed	RahMoc Enterprises	Pontiac	489	4	running	139	$9,965
11	12	7	Kyle Petty	Wood Brothers Racing	Ford	489	1	running	135	$10,870
12	20	27	Rusty Wallace	Blue Max Racing	Pontiac	487	0	running	127	$8,165
13	30	98	Ron Bouchard	Curb Racing	Buick	486	0	running	124	$7,645
14	16	18	Tommy Ellis	Freedlander Motorsports	Chevrolet	485	0	running	121	$3,270
15	27	32	Alan Kulwicki (R)	Terry Racing	Ford	483	0	running	118	$3,870
16	2	25	Tim Richmond	Hendrick Motorsports	Chevrolet	478	0	running	115	$3,170
17	34	67	Buddy Arrington	Arrington Racing	Ford	477	0	running	112	$6,835
18	19	2	Kirk Bryant	Cliff Stewart Racing	Pontiac	476	0	running	109	$6,575
19	33	52	Jimmy Means	Jimmy Means Racing	Pontiac	476	0	running	106	$6,305
20	3	5	Geoff Bodine	Hendrick Motorsports	Chevrolet	459	46	engine	108	$10,470
21	17	23	Michael Waltrip (R)	Bahari Racing	Pontiac	457	0	running	100	$2,165
22	8	90	Ken Schrader	Donlavey Racing	Ford	457	0	running	97	$6,765
23	29	64	Pancho Carter	Langley Racing	Ford	436	0	running	94	$5,430
24	36	92	Jonathan Lee Edwards	Edwards Racing	Chevrolet	432	0	running	91	$2,440
25	26	95	Davey Allison	Sadler Brothers Racing	Chevrolet	410	0	rear end	88	$1,965
26	37	41	Ronnie Thomas	Ronnie Thomas Racing	Chevrolet	356	0	rear end	85	$1,815
27	11	71	Dave Marcis	Marcis Auto Racing	Chevrolet	352	2	engine	87	$4,970
28	14	15	Ricky Rudd	Bud Moore Engineering	Ford	315	0	engine	79	$9,715
29	25	94	Eddie Bierschwale	Eller Racing	Pontiac	231	0	crash	76	$1,665
30	28	17	Phil Parsons	Hamby Racing	Oldsmobile	228	0	engine	73	$4,660
31	38	70	J. D. McDuffie	McDuffie Racing	Pontiac	170	0	engine	70	$4,300
32	35	01	Earle Canavan	Canavan Racing	Pontiac	165	0	engine	67	$1,475
33	21	26	Joe Ruttman	King Racing	Buick	117	0	overheating	64	$2,000
34	6	22	Bobby Allison	Stavola Brothers Racing	Buick	117	2	ignition	66	$1,375
35	31	6	Trevor Boys	U.S. Racing	Chevrolet	101	0	brakes	58	$4,090
36	39	48	Wayne Slark	Hylton Motorsports	Chevrolet	96	0	crash	55	$4,055
37	23	10	Greg Sacks	DiGard Motorsports	Pontiac	81	0	handling	52	$8,300
38	32	74	Bobby Wawak	Wawak Racing	Chevrolet	47	0	engine	49	$1,250
39	24	8	Bobby Hillin Jr.	Stavola Brothers Racing	Buick	41	0	crash	46	$3,960
40	40	20	Rick Newsom	Newsom Racing	Buick	39	0	crash	43	$1,205
Official race results

== Standings after the race ==
Drivers' Championship standings

	Pos	Driver	Points
1	1	Darrell Waltrip	490
4	2	Terry Labonte	478 (-12)
1	3	Dale Earnhardt	448 (-42)
3	4	Geoff Bodine	440 (–50)
	5	Kyle Petty	430 (–60)
1	6	Rusty Wallace	408 (–82)
3	7	Lake Speed	385 (–105)
	8	Ron Bouchard	383 (–107)
2	9	Bill Elliott	375 (–115)
7	10	Bobby Hillin Jr.	361 (–129)
Official driver's standings

- Note: Only the first 10 positions are included for the driver standings.

Previous race: 1986 Miller High Life 400	NASCAR Winston Cup Series; 1986 season	Next race: 1986 Motorcraft 500
