= Sadler Brothers Racing =

Former American stock car team

- Owner(s): Earl Sadler, Check Sadler
- Base: Nashville, Tennessee
- Series: NASCAR Winston Cup Series, NASCAR Nationwide Series, ARCA Re/Max Series
- Race drivers: Sterling Marlin, Mike Alexander, Davey Allison, Jeremy Mayfield, Gary Bradberry
- Manufacturer: Chevrolet; Dodge; Ford
- Opened: 1984
- Closed: 2008

Career
- Drivers' Championships: 0
- Race victories: 0

Sadler Brothers Racing is a former American stock car racing team that ran from 1984 to 2008. It primarily fielded the No. 95 car in the NASCAR Winston Cup Series, the NASCAR Nationwide Series, and the ARCA Re/Max Series, and was owned by Earl Sadler and his son, Check Sadler. While the team did not win a race in either the Cup Series or Nationwide Series, they did win three races in ARCA competition, with Jeremy Mayfield winning at Flat Rock Speedway in 1993, and David Keith winning at Daytona International Speedway and Talladega Superspeedway in 2000.

Earl died on December 24, 2009, at the age of 87, while Check died at the age of 65 on October 2, 2015.

== Motorsports results ==
=== Winston Cup ===
==== Car No. 95 results ====
Year	Driver	No.	Make	1	2	3	4	5	6	7	8	9	10	11	12	13	14	15	16	17	18	19	20	21	22	23	24	25	26	27	28	29	30	31	32	33	34	35	36	Owners	Pts
1984	Sterling Marlin	95	Chevy	DAY	RCH	CAR	ATL	BRI	NWS	DAR	MAR	TAL; 12	NSV; 18	DOV	CLT; 29	RSD	POC; 33	MCH	DAY; 33	NSV	POC	TAL; 32	MCH; 32		DAR; 39	RCH	DOV	MAR	CLT; 35	NWS	CAR	ATL; 9	RSD								
1984	Sterling Marlin	95	Olds																					BRI; 8																	
1985	Sterling Marlin	95	Chevy	DAY; 16	RCH	CAR	ATL; 25	BRI; 22	DAR	NWS	MAR	TAL; 25	DOV	CLT; 34	RSD	POC	MCH	DAY; 33	POC	TAL; 12																					
1985	Mike Alexander	95	Chevy																		MCH; 13	BRI; 26	DAR	RCH	DOV	MAR	NWS; 26	CLT; 18	CAR	ATL	RSD										
1986	Davey Allison	95	Chevy	DAY; DNQ	RCH; 12	CAR; 25	ATL	BRI; 20	DAR; 39	NWS	MAR																														
1986	Davey Allison	95	Buick									TAL; DNQ	DOV	CLT	RSD	POC	MCH	DAY	POC	TAL	GLN	MCH	BRI	DAR	RCH	DOV	MAR	NWS	CLT	CAR	ATL	RSD									
1988	Trevor Boys	95	Chevy	DAY; 19	RCH	CAR	ATL	DAR	BRI	NWS	MAR	TAL; DNQ	CLT	DOV	RSD	POC	MCH	DAY	POC																						
1988	Slick Johnson	95	Chevy																	TAL; DNQ	GLN	MCH; DNQ	BRI	DAR; DNQ	RCH	DOV	MAR	CLT; DNQ	NWS	CAR	PHO	ATL									
1989	Trevor Boys	95	Chevy	DAY; DNQ	CAR	ATL	RCH	DAR	BRI	NWS	MAR	TAL	CLT	DOV	SON	POC	MCH	DAY	POC	TAL	GLN	MCH	BRI	DAR	RCH	DOV	MAR	CLT	NWS	CAR	PHO	ATL									
1991	Rick Jeffrey	95	Chevy	DAY; DNQ	RCH	CAR	ATL	DAR	BRI	NWS	MAR	TAL	CLT	DOV	SON	POC	MCH																								
1991	Kerry Teague	95	Chevy															DAY; DNQ	POC																						
1991	Kerry Teague	95	Olds																										CLT; 37	CAR	PHO										
1991	Eddie Bierschwale	95	Chevy																	TAL; 27	GLN	MCH	BRI	DAR	RCH	DOV	MAR	NWS				ATL; 27									
1992	Bob Schacht	95	Olds	DAY; 42	CAR	RCH	ATL; DNQ	DAR; 19	BRI	NWS	MAR	TAL; 30																													
1992	Bob Schacht	95	Chevy										CLT; 31	DOV	SON	POC	MCH	DAY	POC	TAL	GLN	MCH	BRI	DAR	RCH	DOV	MAR	NWS	CLT	CAR	PHO	ATL									
1993	Ken Ragan	95	Ford	DAY; DNQ	CAR	RCH	ATL	DAR	BRI	NWS	MAR	TAL	SON	CLT	DOV	POC	MCH																								
1993	Jeremy Mayfield	95	Ford															DAY; DNQ	NHA	POC	TAL	GLN	MCH; DNQ	BRI	DAR	RCH	DOV	MAR	NWS	CLT; 29	CAR	PHO	ATL; DNQ								
1994	Jeremy Mayfield	95	Ford	DAY; 30	CAR; DNQ	RCH; 27	ATL; DNQ	DAR	BRI; DNQ	NWS; 30	MAR	TAL; 37	SON	CLT	DOV	POC	MCH	DAY	NHA																						
1994	Ben Hess	95	Ford																		TAL; DNQ	IND; DNQ	GLN	MCH							CLT; DNQ	CAR	PHO	ATL							
1994	Jeff Green	95	Ford																						BRI; DNQ	DAR	RCH; 36	DOV	MAR	NWS; 29											
1995	Doug Heveron	95	Ford	DAY; DNQ	CAR	RCH	ATL	DAR	BRI	NWS	MAR	TAL	SON	CLT	DOV	POC	MCH	DAY	NHA	POC	TAL																				
1995	Loy Allen Jr.	95	Ford																			IND; DNQ	GLN	MCH; DNQ																	
1995	Joe Ruttman	95	Ford																						BRI; DNQ	DAR	RCH	DOV	MAR	NWS	CLT	CAR	PHO	ATL							
1996	Chuck Bown	95	Ford	DAY; DNQ	CAR	RCH	ATL; 40	DAR; DNQ	BRI; DNQ	NWS	MAR	TAL; 25	SON	CLT; 42																											
1996	Gary Bradberry	95	Ford												DOV; 38	POC	MCH	DAY; 35	NHA	POC	TAL; 23	IND; 29	GLN	MCH	BRI; 30	DAR; 35	RCH; DNQ	DOV; 37	MAR; DNQ	NWS; DNQ	CLT; DNQ	CAR; 27	PHO	ATL; 38							
1997	Gary Bradberry	95	Chevy	DAY; DNQ	CAR; DNQ	RCH																																			
1997	Ed Berrier	95	Chevy				ATL; DNQ	DAR	TEX; DNQ	BRI; 23	MAR	SON		CLT; DNQ	DOV; DNQ	POC	MCH; DNQ	CAL	DAY	NHA	POC	IND; 27	GLN	MCH	BRI; 28	DAR	RCH	NHA	DOV	MAR	CLT	TAL; DNQ	CAR; DNQ	PHO	ATL; DNQ						
1997	Ed Berrier	95	Ford										TAL; DNQ																												
1998	Andy Hillenburg	95	Chevy	DAY; 29	CAR	LVS	ATL; DNQ	DAR	BRI	TEX; DNQ	MAR	TAL	CAL	CLT; DNQ	DOV	RCH	MCH	POC	SON	NHA	POC																				
1998	Randy MacDonald	95	Chevy																			IND; DNQ	GLN	MCH	BRI	NHA	DAR	RCH	DOV	MAR	CLT	TAL	DAY	PHO	CAR	ATL					
2000	David Keith	95	Ford	DAY	CAR	LVS	ATL	DAR	BRI	TEX	MAR	TAL	CAL	RCH	CLT	DOV	MCH	POC	SON	DAY	NHA	POC	IND; DNQ	GLN	MCH; DNQ	BRI	DAR	RCH	NHA	DOV	MAR	CLT	TAL	CAR	PHO	HOM	ATL				
2001	Ed Berrier	95	Ford	DAY	CAR	LVS	ATL	DAR	BRI	TEX	MAR	TAL	CAL	RCH	CLT	DOV	MCH	POC	SON	DAY	CHI	NHA	POC	IND; DNQ	GLN	MCH	BRI	DAR	RCH	DOV	KAN	CLT	MAR	TAL	PHO	CAR	HOM	ATL	NHA		
