= Eddie Bierschwale =

American racecar driver

- Born: June 29, 1959 (age 67); San Antonio, Texas, U.S.

NASCAR Cup Series career
- 117 races run over 10 years
- Best finish: 24th - 1985
- First race: 1983 Coca-Cola 500 (Atlanta)
- Last race: 1992 Hooters 500 (Atlanta)
Wins	Top tens	Poles
0	1	0
- Statistics up to date as of July 24, 2012.

Edward Alan Bierschwale (born June 29, 1959) is an American former NASCAR Winston Cup driver from San Antonio, Texas. He made his Cup debut in 1983 in a car owned by his father Don. In 1985, he got a full-season ride with D.K. Ulrich and stayed with the team until the end of the 1986 season when he was let go. After bouncing from team to team in 1987, he returned to his father's team in 1988 and participated in a partial schedule with them until he retired from racing in 1992. His best Cup finish was a tenth in the 1989 Daytona 500 (he started the car, but jumped out of the car in favor of Kyle Petty, who had failed to qualify for the race in his No. 42). Bierschwale is also the driver who famously served as a relief driver for Richard Petty’s No. 43 ride in the 1992 Pepsi 400, as Petty was suffering from the effects of the hot weather in Daytona Beach, Florida that day, rendering him unable to finish. He often raced in the No. 23.

== Biographical ==
His father Don was a funeral director who started a racing team with a co-founder. The team was B-B Racing.

== Motorsports career results ==
=== NASCAR ===
(key) (Bold – Pole position awarded by qualifying time. Italics – Pole position earned by points standings or practice time. * – Most laps led.)

==== Winston Cup Series ====
NASCAR Winston Cup Series results
Year	Team	No.	Make	1	2	3	4	5	6	7	8	9	10	11	12	13	14	15	16	17	18	19	20	21	22	23	24	25	26	27	28	29	30	NWCC	Pts	Ref
1983	B & B Racing	03	Buick	DAY	RCH	CAR	ATL; 26	DAR	NWS	MAR	TAL	NSV	DOV	BRI	CLT	RSD	POC	MCH; DNQ	DAY	NSV	POC	TAL	MCH; 26	BRI	DAR	RCH	DOV	MAR	NWS	CLT	CAR	ATL; 34	RSD	51st	231	
1984	B & B Racing	03	Chevy	DAY	RCH	CAR	ATL	BRI	NWS	DAR	MAR	TAL	NSV	DOV	CLT	RSD	POC	MCH	DAY	NSV	POC	TAL; 31	MCH	BRI	DAR	RCH	DOV	MAR	CLT	NWS	CAR			66th	146	
1984	B & B Racing	03	Buick																													ATL; 29	RSD	66th	146	
1985	U.S. Racing	6	Chevy	DAY; DNQ	RCH	CAR; 23	ATL; 15	BRI; 15	DAR; 19	NWS; 29	MAR; 20	TAL; 19	DOV; 32	CLT; 19	RSD; 18	POC; 34	MCH; 29	DAY; 31	POC; 17	TAL; 34	MCH; 21	BRI; 20	DAR; 32	RCH; 29	DOV; 27	MAR; 18	NWS; 19	CLT; 21	CAR; 17	ATL; 24	RSD; 32			24th	2396	
1986	C & M Motorsports	94	Pontiac	DAY; DNQ	RCH; DNQ	CAR; 29	ATL; DNQ	BRI; 29	DAR; 34	NWS; DNQ	MAR																							25th	1860	
1986	Gray Racing	54	Chevy	DAY; 31			ATL; 30					TAL; 30	DOV					DAY; 35		TAL; 39														25th	1860	
1986	Hylton Motorsports	48	Chevy		RCH; 31																													25th	1860	
1986	Ingle Racing	32	Chevy											CLT; 29	RSD																			25th	1860	
1986	Langley Racing	64	Ford													POC; 32	MCH; 27		POC; 15		GLN; 30	MCH; 16												25th	1860	
1986	Hamby Motorsports	17	Olds																				BRI; 18						CLT; 24	CAR; 16	ATL; 23	RSD; DNQ		25th	1860	
1986	Hamby Motorsports	17	Chevy																					DAR; 25	RCH; 11	DOV; 25	MAR; 24	NWS; 20						25th	1860	
1987	Arrington Racing	67	Ford	DAY; 36	CAR; 18	RCH; 18	ATL; 42	DAR; 16	NWS; DNQ	BRI; 25	MAR; 24	TAL; 18																						34th	1162	
1987	Fillip Racing	81	Ford						NWS; 18																									34th	1162	
1987	Branch-Ragan Racing	77	Ford										CLT; 28	DOV	POC	RSD	MCH; 19	DAY; 33	POC	TAL	GLN													34th	1162	
1987	S & H Racing	80	Chevy																			MCH; DNQ	BRI			DOV; 37	MAR	NWS	CLT; DNQ	CAR; 23	RSD	ATL		34th	1162	
1987	AAG Racing	34	Chevy																					DAR; 25	RCH									34th	1162	
1988	B & B Racing	23	Olds	DAY; 28	RCH		ATL; 17	DAR; 14	BRI	NWS	MAR	TAL; 39	CLT; 28	DOV; 40	RSD	POC; 29	MCH; 26	DAY; 31	POC; 38	TAL; 31	GLN	MCH; 24	BRI	DAR; 26	RCH; 27	DOV; 26	MAR	CLT; 40	NWS	CAR; 33	PHO; 40	ATL; 24		34th	1481	
1988	B & B Racing	23	Chevy			CAR; 32																												34th	1481	
1989	B & B Racing	23	Olds	DAY; 10	CAR; 26	ATL; 23	RCH; 31	DAR; 21	BRI; 19	NWS; 18	MAR; DNQ	TAL; 39	CLT; 36	DOV; 27	SON; 34	POC	MCH; 29	DAY				MCH; 28	BRI	DAR	RCH	DOV	MAR	CLT; 25	NWS	CAR	PHO	ATL; DNQ		36th	1306	
1989	Linro Motorsports	13	Chevy																POC; 32	TAL														36th	1306	
1989	Speed Racing	83	Olds																		GLN; 38													36th	1306	
1990	U.S. Racing	2	Olds	DAY; 32	RCH	CAR	ATL	DAR	BRI	NWS	MAR	TAL	CLT	DOV	SON	POC																		54th	240	
1990	B & B Racing	23	Olds														MCH; 29	DAY	POC	TAL	GLN	MCH	BRI	DAR	RCH	DOV	MAR	NWS	CLT; 22	CAR	PHO	ATL		54th	240	
1991	B & B Racing	23	Olds	DAY; 12	RCH	CAR	ATL	DAR	BRI	NWS	MAR	TAL	CLT; 24	DOV	SON	POC	MCH; 38	DAY; DNQ	POC							DOV; DNQ	MAR	NWS	CLT	CAR	PHO			42nd	431	
1991	Sadler Brothers Racing	95	Chevy																	TAL; 27	GLN	MCH	BRI	DAR	RCH							ATL; 27		42nd	431	
1992	B & B Racing	23	Olds	DAY; DNQ	CAR	RCH	ATL; 40	DAR; DNQ	BRI	NWS	MAR; DNQ	TAL; DNQ	CLT; DNQ	DOV	SON	POC	MCH	DAY; 38	POC	TAL	GLN	MCH; 28	BRI	DAR	RCH	DOV	MAR	NWS	CLT	CAR	PHO	ATL; 19		47th	277	
1993	B & B Racing	23	Olds	DAY; DNQ	CAR	RCH	ATL	DAR	BRI	NWS	MAR	TAL	SON	CLT	DOV	POC	MCH	DAY; DNQ	NHA	POC	TAL	GLN	MCH	BRI	DAR	RCH	DOV	MAR	NWS	CLT	CAR	PHO	ATL	NA	-	

===== Daytona 500 =====
Year	Team	Manufacturer	Start	Finish
1985	U.S. Racing	Chevrolet	DNQ	
1986	C & M Motorsports	Pontiac	DNQ	
1986	Gray Racing	Chevrolet	30	31
1987	Arrington Racing	Ford	34	36
1988	B & B Racing	Oldsmobile	23	28
1989	B & B Racing	Oldsmobile	41	10
1990	U.S. Racing	Oldsmobile	41	32
1991	B & B Racing	Oldsmobile	40	12
1992	B & B Racing	Oldsmobile	DNQ	
1993	B & B Racing	Oldsmobile	DNQ	

=== ARCA Hooters SuperCar Series ===
(key) (Bold – Pole position awarded by qualifying time. Italics – Pole position earned by points standings or practice time. * – Most laps led.)

ARCA Hooters SuperCar Series results
Year	Team	No.	Make	1	2	3	4	5	6	7	8	9	10	11	12	13	14	15	16	17	18	19	20	21	AHSSC	Pts	Ref
1991		12	Olds	DAY	ATL	KIL	TAL	TOL	FRS	POC	MCH	KIL	FRS	DEL	POC	TAL	HPT	MCH	ISF	TOL	DSF	TWS; 3			71st	-	
1991	B & B Racing	23	Olds																				ATL; 14		71st	-	
1992	B & B Racing	23	Olds	DAY	FIF	TWS; 1*	TAL	TOL	KIL	POC	MCH	FRS	KIL	NSH	DEL	POC	HPT	FRS	ISF	TOL	DSF	TWS; 32	SLM	ATL	78th	-	
1993	B & B Racing	23	Olds	DAY	FIF	TWS; 29	TAL	KIL	CMS	FRS	TOL	POC	MCH	FRS	POC	KIL	ISF	DSF	TOL	SLM	WIN				66th	-	
1993	Bobby Jones Racing	50	Ford																			ATL; 29			66th	-	
