= Trevor Boys =

Canadian racing driver (1957–2023)

Trevor W. Boys
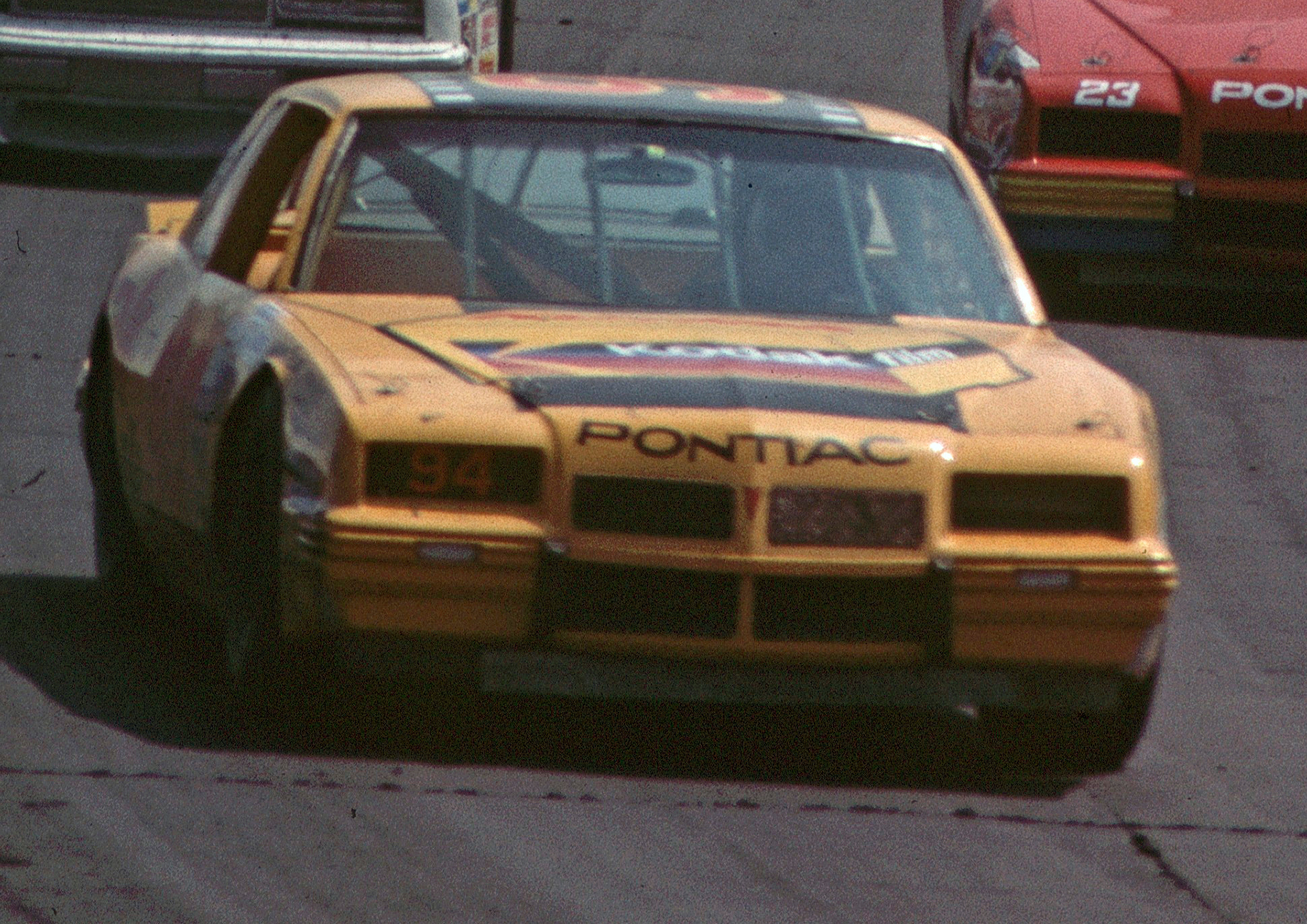
- Boys racing in 1986
- Born: November 3, 1957; Calgary, Alberta, Canada
- Died: February 2, 2023 (aged 65); Calgary, Alberta, Canada

NASCAR Cup Series career
- 102 races run over 9 years
- Best finish: 17th (1984)
- First race: 1982 Winston Western 500 (Riverside)
- Last race: 1993 Champion Spark Plug 500 (Pocono)
Wins	Top tens	Poles
0	2	0

NASCAR O'Reilly Auto Parts Series career
- 3 races run over 2 years
- 2008 position: 130th
- Best finish: 120th (2007)
- First race: 2007 AT&T 250 (Milwaukee)
- Last race: 2008 NAPA Auto Parts 200 Presented by Dodge (Montreal)
Wins	Top tens	Poles
0	0	0

NASCAR FedEx Freight Truck Series career
- 6 races run over 2 years
- 2009 position: 104th
- Best finish: 49th (2003)
- First race: 2003 Lucas Oil 250 (Mesa Marin)
- Last race: 2009 Las Vegas 350 (Las Vegas)
Wins	Top tens	Poles
0	0	0
- Statistics up to date as of May 4, 2020.

Trevor Boys (November 3, 1957 – February 2, 2023) was a Canadian race car driver.

== Career ==
Boys raced in 102 Winston Cup races from 1982 to 1993, posting two top-ten finishes, and ran six races in the Craftsman Truck Series in 2003, his best finish in that series being a 22nd at Memphis Motorsports Park.

Boys competed in the 1988 NASCAR Christmas 500 at Calder Park Thunderdome in Australia, finishing in fourth.

In October 2006, Boys attempted to start racing again with a team called H&K Motorsports. The team was a co-owned business with Eddie Kucharski. Boys made two NASCAR Busch Series starts in 2007, both for Randy MacDonald. He started fortieth at Milwaukee and finished nine laps down in 29th. His final NASCAR start was at the race in Montreal at the Circuit Gilles Villeneuve. He started 41st and finished 35th with transmission troubles on the road course.

== Motorsports career results ==
=== NASCAR ===
(key) (Bold – Pole position awarded by qualifying time. Italics – Pole position earned by points standings or practice time. * – Most laps led.)

==== Sprint Cup Series ====
NASCAR Sprint Cup Series results
Year	Team	No.	Make	1	2	3	4	5	6	7	8	9	10	11	12	13	14	15	16	17	18	19	20	21	22	23	24	25	26	27	28	29	30	31	32	33	34	35	36	NSCC	Pts	Ref
1982	Boys Racing	84	Pontiac	DAY	RCH	BRI	ATL	CAR	DAR	NWS	MAR	TAL	NSV	DOV	CLT	POC	RSD	MCH	DAY	NSV	POC	TAL	MCH	BRI	DAR	RCH	DOV	NWS	CLT	MAR	CAR	ATL	RSD; 22							86th	97	
1983	Hylton Motorsports	49	Chevy	DAY	RCH	CAR	ATL	DAR	NWS	MAR; 29	TAL																													25th	2293	
1983	Hylton Motorsports	48	Chevy									NSV; 19	DOV; 32	BRI; 22	CLT; 20	RSD; 32	POC; 14	MCH; 18	DAY; 17	NSV; 13	POC; 14	TAL; 17	MCH; 19	BRI; 17	DAR; 28	RCH; 9	DOV; 31	MAR; 11	NWS; 19	CLT; 16	CAR; 32	ATL; 11	RSD; 24							25th	2293	
1984	Hylton Motorsports	48	Chevy	DAY; 41	RCH; 26	CAR; 19	ATL; 15	BRI; 16	NWS; 17	DAR; 16	MAR; 22	TAL; 18	NSV; 17	DOV; 19	CLT; 35	RSD; 13	POC; 32	MCH; 37	DAY; 16	NSV; 22	POC; 13	TAL; 24	MCH; 27	BRI; 18	DAR; 11	RCH; 27	DOV; 10	MAR; 26	CLT; 12	NWS; 27	CAR; 11	ATL; 23	RSD; 12							17th	3040	
1985	Benfield Racing	98	Chevy	DAY; 27	RCH; 24	CAR; 39	ATL	BRI	DAR; 29	NWS	MAR	TAL; 39	DOV	CLT; 41	RSD	POC																								28th	1461	
1985	Hylton Motorsports	49	Chevy														MCH; 24	DAY; 26	POC; 20	TAL; 32	MCH; 30	BRI; 17	DAR; 31	RCH	DOV; 34	MAR; 12	NWS; 22	CLT; 23	CAR; 20	ATL; 37										28th	1461	
1985	Boys Racing	24	Chevy																												RSD; 40									28th	1461	
1986	U.S. Racing	6	Chevy	DAY; 18		CAR; 35	ATL; 24	BRI; 18	DAR; 24	NWS; 30	MAR; 14	TAL; 38																												34th	1064	
1986	U.S. Racing	6	Buick		RCH; 26																																			34th	1064	
1986	C & M Motorsports	94	Pontiac										DOV; 13	CLT; 25	RSD; 34	POC	MCH	DAY	POC	TAL	GLN	MCH	BRI	DAR	RCH	DOV	MAR													34th	1064	
1986	Hylton Motorsports	48	Chevy																									NWS; 29	CLT											34th	1064	
1986	DiGard Motorsports	10	Chevy																											CAR; 37	ATL	RSD								34th	1064	
1987	U.S. Racing	6	Chevy	DAY; 23	CAR	RCH	ATL	DAR	NWS	BRI	MAR	TAL	CLT	DOV																										45th	460	
1987	Andrew Scott	08	Chevy												POC; 18	RSD	MCH	DAY																						45th	460	
1987	Hamby Motorsports	12	Chevy																POC; 11	TAL	GLN; 38																			45th	460	
1987	Hamby Motorsports	12	Olds																			MCH; DNQ	BRI	DAR; 36						CAR; 21	RSD; DNQ	ATL; DNQ								45th	460	
1987	Langley Racing	64	Ford																						RCH; 24	DOV; 33	MAR	NWS; 24	CLT; 25											45th	460	
1988	Sadler Brothers Racing	95	Chevy	DAY; 19	RCH	CAR	ATL	DAR	BRI	NWS	MAR	TAL; DNQ	CLT	DOV	RSD	POC	MCH	DAY	POC	TAL	GLN	MCH	BRI	DAR	RCH	DOV	MAR	CLT	NWS	CAR										65th		
1988	Boys Racing	69	Olds																												PHO; 20	ATL								65th		
1989	Sadler Brothers Racing	95	Chevy	DAY; DNQ	CAR	ATL	RCH	DAR	BRI	NWS	MAR	TAL	CLT	DOV	SON																									NA	0	
1989	Hylton Motorsports	49	Buick													POC; 31	MCH	DAY	POC	TAL	GLN	MCH	BRI	DAR	RCH	DOV	MAR	CLT	NWS	CAR	PHO	ATL								NA	0	
1990	Lusty Racing	48	Buick	DAY; DNQ	RCH	CAR	ATL	DAR	BRI	NWS	MAR	TAL	CLT	DOV	SON	POC	MCH	DAY	POC	TAL	GLN	MCH	BRI	DAR	RCH	DOV	MAR	NWS	CLT	CAR	PHO	ATL								NA	-	
1993	Hylton Motorsports	48	Pontiac	DAY	CAR	RCH	ATL	DAR	BRI	NWS	MAR	TAL	SON	CLT	DOV	POC; 35	MCH; DNQ	DAY	NHA	POC	TAL	GLN	MCH	BRI	DAR; DNQ	RCH	DOV; DNQ	MAR	NWS	CLT	CAR	PHO	ATL							79th	63	
1994	Hylton Motorsports	48	Pontiac	DAY; DNQ	CAR	RCH	ATL	DAR	BRI	NWS	MAR	TAL	SON	CLT	DOV	POC	MCH	DAY	NHA	POC	TAL	IND	GLN	MCH	BRI	DAR	RCH	DOV	MAR	NWS	CLT	CAR	PHO	ATL						NA	-	
2009	Boys Will Be Boys Racing	06	Dodge	DAY	CAL	LVS	ATL	BRI	MAR	TEX	PHO; DNQ	TAL	RCH; DNQ	DAR	CLT	DOV	POC	MCH	SON	NHA	DAY	CHI	IND	POC	GLN	MCH	BRI	ATL	RCH	NHA	DOV	KAN	CAL	CLT	MAR	TAL	TEX	PHO	HOM	NA	-	

===== Daytona 500 =====
Year	Team	Manufacturer	Start	Finish
1984	Hylton Motorsports	Chevy	35	41
1985	Benfield Racing	Chevy	35	27
1986	U.S. Racing	Chevy	19	18
1987	U.S. Racing	Chevy	28	23
1988	Sadler Brothers Racing	Chevy	28	19
1989	Sadler Brothers Racing	Chevy	DNQ	
1990	Lusty Racing	Buick	DNQ	
1994	Hylton Motorsports	Pontiac	DNQ	

==== Nationwide Series ====
NASCAR Nationwide Series results
Year	Team	No.	Make	1	2	3	4	5	6	7	8	9	10	11	12	13	14	15	16	17	18	19	20	21	22	23	24	25	26	27	28	29	30	31	32	33	34	35	NNSC	Pts	Ref
2006	Buddie Boys	08	Chevy	DAY	CAL	MXC	LVS	ATL	BRI	TEX	NSH	PHO	TAL	RCH	DAR	CLT	DOV	NSH	KEN	MLW	DAY	CHI	NHA	MAR	GTY	IRP	GLN	MCH	BRI	CAL	RCH	DOV	KAN	CLT	MEM	TEX	PHO	HOM; DNQ	NA	-	
2007	MacDonald Motorsports	71	Chevy	DAY	CAL	MXC	LVS	ATL	BRI	NSH	TEX	PHO	TAL	RCH	DAR	CLT	DOV	NSH	KEN	MLW; 29	NHA	DAY	CHI	GTY	IRP	CGV; 35	GLN	MCH	BRI	CAL	RCH	DOV	KAN	CLT	MEM	TEX	PHO	HOM	120th	134	
2008	JD Motorsports	01	Chevy	DAY	CAL	LVS	ATL	BRI	NSH	TEX	PHO	MXC	TAL	RCH	DAR	CLT	DOV	NSH	KEN	MLW	NHA	DAY	CHI	GTY	IRP	CGV; 34	GLN	MCH	BRI	CAL	RCH	DOV	KAN	CLT	MEM	TEX	PHO	HOM	130th	61	

==== Camping World Truck Series ====
NASCAR Camping World Truck Series results
Year	Team	No.	Make	1	2	3	4	5	6	7	8	9	10	11	12	13	14	15	16	17	18	19	20	21	22	23	24	25	NCWTC	Pts	Ref
2003	Troxell Racing	93	Chevy	DAY	DAR	MMR; 36	MAR	CLT	DOV	TEX																			49th	471	
2003	Ron Rhodes Racing	36	Dodge								MEM; 22	MLW; DNQ										CAL; 29	LVS; DNQ	SBO	TEX	MAR	PHO	HOM	49th	471	
2003	MLB Motorsports	66	Dodge									MLW; 26	KAN; 24	KEN; 32	GTW	MCH	IRP	NSH	BRI	RCH	NHA								49th	471	
2009	Tagsby Racing	65	Chevy	DAY	CAL	ATL	MAR	KAN	CLT	DOV	TEX	MCH; 27	MLW	MEM; 31	KEN	IRP	NSH	BRI	CHI	IOW	GTW	NHA							104th	70	
2009	Lafferty Motorsports	89	Chevy																				LVS; 35	MAR	TAL	TEX	PHO	HOM	104th	70	

=== ARCA Hooters SuperCar Series ===
(key) (Bold – Pole position awarded by qualifying time. Italics – Pole position earned by points standings or practice time. * – Most laps led.)

ARCA Hooters SuperCar Series results
Year	Team	No.	Make	1	2	3	4	5	6	7	8	9	10	11	12	13	14	15	16	17	18	19	20	21	AHSSC	Pts	Ref
1985	Buddie Boys Racing	8	Chevrolet	ATL	DAY	ATL	TAL	ATL; 11	SSP	IRP	CSP	FRS	IRP	OEF	ISF	DSF	TOL								78th	-	
1986	Buddie Boys Racing	48	Chevrolet	ATL	DAY	ATL	TAL	SIR	SSP	FRS	KIL	CSP	TAL	BLN	ISF	DSF	TOL	OWO	ATL; DNQ						NA	-	
1987	Hamby Motorsports	72	Olds	DAY	ATL	TAL	DEL	ACS	TOL	ROC	POC	FRS	KIL	TAL	FRS	ISF	INF	DSF	SLM	ATL; 22					88th	-	
1988	Boys Racing	69	Olds	DAY	ATL	TAL	FRS	PCS	ROC	POC	WIN	KIL	ACS	SLM	POC	TAL	DEL	FRS	ISF	DSF	SLM	ATL; 25			92nd	-	
1989	Hylton Motorsports	48	Buick	DAY	ATL; 2	KIL	TAL	FRS	POC	KIL	HAG	POC	TAL	DEL	FRS	ISF	TOL	DSF	SLM	ATL					91st	-	
1993	Hylton Motorsports	48	Pontiac	DAY	FIF	TWS	TAL	KIL	CMS	FRS	TOL	POC	MCH	FRS	POC	KIL	ISF	DSF	TOL	SLM	WIN	ATL; 25			101st	-	
1994	Hylton Motorsports	48	Pontiac	DAY; DNQ	TAL	FIF	LVL	KIL	TOL	FRS	MCH	DMS	POC	POC	KIL	FRS	INF	I70	ISF	DSF	TOL	SLM	WIN	ATL	NA	-	

== Death ==
Boys died on February 2, 2023, at the age of 65.
