= Mach 1 Racing =

Auto-racing company

- Owner(s): Hal Needham; Burt Reynolds
- Series: NASCAR Winston Cup Series
- Race drivers: Stan Barrett; Harry Gant; Morgan Shepherd
- Manufacturer: Buick
- Opened: 1981
- Closed: 1989

Career
- Race victories: 9

Mach 1 Racing was a NASCAR Winston Cup Series team. It was owned by Hollywood stuntman Hal Needham and actor Burt Reynolds.

The team made its debut in 1981, fielding the No. 22 Skoal Pontiac driven by Stan Barrett. Barrett ran ten races for the team that season, his best finish coming at Talladega Superspeedway, where he finished 9th. Midseason, Mach 1 created a second car, the No. 33, driven by Harry Gant. Gant did not win that season, but he won three poles and had thirteen top-tens, finishing third in points.

In 1982, Gant drove the No. 33 Buick full-time with sponsorship from 7-Eleven/Skoal. He won at Martinsville and Charlotte and finished fourth in points. After just one win the following season, the team switched to Chevrolet, and Gant won three races, finishing a career best second in points. He followed that season up with another three wins in 1985.

For the next three years, Gant and Mach 1 failed to visit victory lane. Midway into the 1988 season, Gant suffered injuries at the Coca-Cola 600. Morgan Shepherd filled in for him, and had one top-five and two top-tens. After Gant finished 27th in the final standings, he left the team for Jackson Bros. Motorsports, taking Skoal and No. 33 with him.

In 1989, Needham sold the team to Bill Edwards, a North Carolina businessman, switched to the No. 66 and signed rookie driver Rick Mast. In their first race together, the Daytona 500, Mast drove the unsponsored car to a sixth-place finish, an accomplishment he later said was the one he was the most proud of. Mast and Mach 1 ran twelve more races together that season, they were unable to duplicate that effort. Edwards closed the team and sold it to their crew chief, Travis Carter. Travis Carter Motorsports entered NASCAR competition in the 1990 Daytona 500.

== Car No. 22 results ==
Year	Driver	No.	Make	1	2	3	4	5	6	7	8	9	10	11	12	13	14	15	16	17	18	19	20	21	22	23	24	25	26	27	28	29	30	31	Owners	Pts
1981	Stan Barrett	22	Pontiac	RSD	DAY; 13	RCH	CAR; 36	ATL; 16	BRI	NWS	DAR	MAR	TAL; 35	NSV	DOV	CLT; 32	TWS	RSD; 11	MCH; 18	DAY; 26	NSV	POC; 14	TAL; 9	MCH	BRI	DAR	RCH	DOV	MAR	NWS	CLT	CAR	ATL	RSD		

== Car No. 33 results ==
Year	Driver	No.	Make	1	2	3	4	5	6	7	8	9	10	11	12	13	14	15	16	17	18	19	20	21	22	23	24	25	26	27	28	29	30	31	Owners	Pts
1981	Harry Gant	33	Pontiac	RSD	DAY	RCH	CAR	ATL	BRI	NWS	DAR; 2	MAR	TAL; 34	NSV			TWS; 10		MCH; 2		NSV; 8	POC; 4		MCH; 4	BRI; 11	DAR; 14	RCH; 2	DOV; 23	MAR; 2*	NWS; 24	CLT; 41	CAR; 3	ATL; 20	RSD; 8		
1981	Harry Gant	33	Chevy												DOV; 16	CLT; 2		RSD; 31																		
1981	Harry Gant	33	Buick																	DAY; 2			TAL; 4													
1982	Harry Gant	33	Buick	DAY; 7	RCH; 30	BRI; 6	ATL; 5	CAR; 8	DAR; 19	NWS; 6	MAR; 1*	TAL; 14	NSV; 29		CLT; 13	POC; 4	RSD; 35	MCH; 10	DAY; 24	NSV; 3	POC; 22	TAL; 38	MCH; 3	BRI; 3	DAR; 11	RCH; 7	DOV; 12	NWS; 2	CLT; 1	MAR; 8	CAR; 32	ATL; 2	RSD; 26			
1982	Harry Gant	33	Pontiac											DOV; 30																						
1983	Harry Gant	33	Buick	DAY; 37	RCH; 5	CAR; 5	ATL; 11	DAR; 1	NWS; 3	MAR; 2	TAL; 4	NSV; 3	DOV; 9	BRI; 27	CLT; 25	RSD; 3	POC; 18	MCH; 8	DAY; 11	NSV; 8	POC; 5	TAL; 5	MCH; 30	BRI; 6	DAR; 22	RCH; 20	DOV; 17	MAR; 8	NWS; 9	CLT; 29	CAR; 23	ATL; 37	RSD; 31			
1984	Harry Gant	33	Chevy	DAY; 6	RCH; 8	CAR; 24	ATL; 6	BRI; 23	NWS; 2	DAR; 6	MAR; 13	TAL; 2	NSV; 16	DOV; 27*	CLT; 4	RSD; 29	POC; 2	MCH; 4	DAY; 2	NSV; 9	POC; 1*	TAL; 7	MCH; 4	BRI; 5	DAR; 1*	RCH; 9	DOV; 1*	MAR; 4	CLT; 4	NWS; 2	CAR; 2*	ATL; 26	RSD; 8			
1985	Harry Gant	33	Chevy	DAY; 26	RCH; 5	CAR; 2*	ATL; 24	BRI; 20	DAR; 14	NWS; 10	MAR; 1*	TAL; 38	DOV; 2	CLT; 2	RSD; 2	POC; 2	MCH; 16	DAY; 24	POC; 5	TAL; 7	MCH; 3	BRI; 6	DAR; 21	RCH; 6	DOV; 1*	MAR; 3	NWS; 1*	CLT; 24*	CAR; 3	ATL; 8	RSD; 4					
1986	Harry Gant	33	Chevy	DAY; 30	RCH; 28	CAR; 2	ATL; 12	BRI; 4	DAR; 14	NWS; 7	MAR; 25	TAL; 21	DOV; 14*	CLT; 4	RSD; 9	POC; 26	MCH; 2*	DAY; 31	POC; 30	TAL; 22	GLN; 34	MCH; 8	BRI; 5	DAR; 27	RCH; 7	DOV; 35	MAR; 3	NWS; 5	CLT; 2	CAR; 4	ATL; 28	RSD; 37				
1987	Harry Gant	33	Chevy	DAY; 31	CAR; 29	RCH; 25	ATL; 34	DAR; 7	NWS; 11	BRI; 6	MAR; 27	TAL; 29	CLT; 24	DOV; 30	POC; 32	RSD; 25	MCH; 13	DAY; 9	POC; 30	TAL; 31	GLN; 18	MCH; 26	BRI; 8	DAR; 39	RCH; 25	DOV; 25	MAR; 14	NWS; 31	CLT; 33	CAR; 13	RSD; 28	ATL; 24				
1988	Harry Gant	33	Chevy	DAY; 29	RCH; 28	CAR; 28	ATL; 21	DAR; 38	BRI; 18	NWS; 12	MAR; 26	TAL; 36	CLT; 30						POC; 10	TAL; 16	GLN; 31	MCH; 21	BRI; 6	DAR; 40	RCH; 32	DOV; 11	MAR; 30	CLT; 24	NWS; 30	CAR; 7	PHO; 12	ATL; 30				
1988	Morgan Shepherd	33	Chevy											DOV; 2	RSD; 42	POC; 16	MCH; 34	DAY; 7																		

== Car No. 66 results ==
Year	Driver	No.	Make	1	2	3	4	5	6	7	8	9	10	11	12	13	14	15	16	17	18	19	20	21	22	23	24	25	26	27	28	29	Owners	Pts
1989	Rick Mast	66	Chevy	DAY; 6	CAR; 21	ATL; 25	RCH; 16	DAR; 34	BRI; 14	NWS; 25	MAR; 32	TAL; DNQ	CLT; 11	DOV	SON	POC	MCH	DAY	POC	TAL; 32	GLN	MCH	BRI; 13	DAR	RCH	DOV	MAR	CLT; 13	NWS	CAR	PHO	ATL; 31		
