= Tommy Ellis =

American racing driver (born 1947)

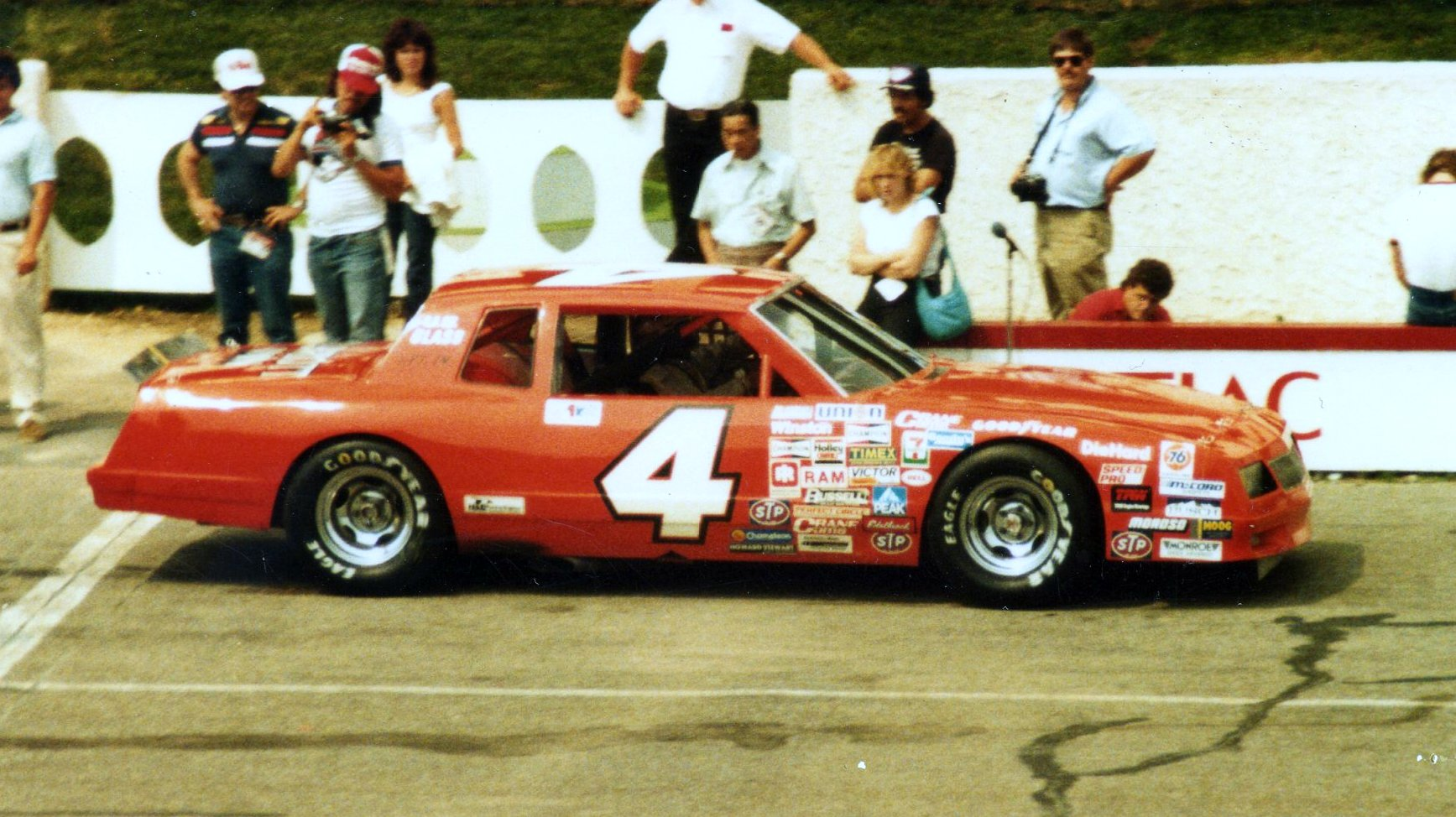
- Ellis' 1984 car at Pocono Raceway
- Born: August 8, 1947 (age 79); Richmond, Virginia, U.S.
- Achievements: 1981 NASCAR Late Model Sportsman Series Champion; 1988 NASCAR Busch Series champion

NASCAR Cup Series career
- 78 races run over 12 years
- Best finish: 23rd (1986)
- First race: 1976 Delaware 500 (Dover)
- Last race: 1991 Budweiser 500 (Dover)
Wins	Top tens	Poles
0	6	0

NASCAR O'Reilly Auto Parts Series career
- 235 races run over 14 years
- Best finish: 1st (1988)
- First race: 1982 Goody's 300 (Daytona)
- Last race: 1995 Detroit Gasket 200 (Michigan)
- First win: 1982 Gene Lovelace 200 (Langley Field)
- Last win: 1990 Budweiser 300 (Loudon)
Wins	Top tens	Poles
22	108	28
- Statistics up to date as of March 4, 2012.

Tommy Ellis (born August 8, 1947) is an American former stock car racing driver who competed in the 1970s and 1980s. Often referred to as "Terrible" Tommy Ellis for his rough tactics, he won the last national late model sportsman championship in 1981, the final year before the format changed from "points chasing" late model sportsman racing at various short tracks across the country (now known as the Whelen All-American Series) to the current touring format, currently known as the O'Reilly Auto Parts Series, the next year. He won the then-called Busch Series championship in 1988.

== Racing career ==
Ellis's success (twelve poles and eight wins) in the first two seasons of the Busch Series earned him a shot at a Winston Cup ride. Driving for most of three seasons in the Chevrolet camp, his best finish was an eighth at Dover in 1986. He was also considered an excellent sub-driver in the Cup Series, filling in for Neil Bonnett in 1989 and replacing a suspended Geoff Bodine at Junior Johnson Motorsports two years later.

After his release from Freedlander Racing in 1986, Ellis returned to the Busch Series with J&J Racing. Between 1988 and 1990 Ellis won nine poles and seven races. He was the Busch Series champion in 1988 in an unsponsored Buick. In 1991, he competed in the Winston at Charlotte Motor Speedway, replacing Bodine.

Ellis' Busch Series career totals are 28 poles (second all-time behind Mark Martin) and 22 wins (tied for thirteenth all-time with Sam Ard).

Ellis' last Busch Series start was in 1995.

Ellis was a stunt driver for the film Days of Thunder along with Bobby Hamilton and drove race cars numbered 51 and 18 in selected races.

== Legal troubles ==
In 2010, Ellis and his wife Brenda were sentenced to eighteen months in prison after pleading guilty to federal tax-evasion charges. They had underreported the income generated by their car-wash business by over $300,000 between 2003 and 2007.

== Motorsports career results ==
=== NASCAR ===
(key) (Bold – Pole position awarded by qualifying time. Italics – Pole position earned by points standings or practice time. * – Most laps led.)

==== Winston Cup Series ====
NASCAR Winston Cup Series results
Year	Team	No.	Make	1	2	3	4	5	6	7	8	9	10	11	12	13	14	15	16	17	18	19	20	21	22	23	24	25	26	27	28	29	30	31	NWCC	Pts	Ref
1976	Champion Racing	10	Ford	RSD	DAY	CAR	RCH	BRI	ATL	NWS	DAR	MAR	TAL	NSV	DOV	CLT	RSD	MCH	DAY	NSV	POC	TAL	MCH	BRI	DAR	RCH	DOV; 21	MAR	NWS	CLT	CAR	ATL	ONT		92nd	100	
1981	Ellis Racing	55	Chevy	RSD	DAY	RCH	CAR	ATL	BRI	NWS	DAR	MAR	TAL	NSV	DOV	CLT	TWS	RSD	MCH	DAY	NSV	POC	TAL	MCH	BRI	DAR	RCH; 26	DOV	MAR; 30	NWS	CLT; 4	CAR	ATL; 33	RSD	62nd	392	
1982	Gordon Racing	24	Buick	DAY; DNQ																															75th	260	
1982	Ellis Racing	12	Chevy		RCH; 11	BRI	ATL	CAR	DAR	NWS	MAR	TAL	NSV	DOV	CLT	POC	RSD	MCH	DAY	NSV	POC	TAL	MCH	BRI	DAR	RCH; 11	DOV	NWS	CLT	MAR	CAR	ATL	RSD		75th	260	
1983	Terry Motorsports	32	Buick	DAY	RCH	CAR	ATL	DAR	NWS	MAR	TAL	NSV	DOV	BRI	CLT; 15	RSD	POC	MCH	DAY	NSV	POC	TAL	MCH	BRI	DAR	RCH	DOV	MAR	NWS	CLT	CAR	ATL	RSD		NA	-	
1984	Morgan–McClure Motorsports	4	Chevy	DAY	RCH	CAR	ATL	BRI; 28	NWS; 29	DAR; 23	MAR; 29	TAL; 13	NSV; 14	DOV	CLT; 14	RSD	POC	MCH; 38	DAY; 14	NSV; 11	POC; 34	TAL; 9	MCH; 36	BRI; 28	DAR; 19	RCH; 15	DOV; 34	MAR; 17	CLT; 33	NWS; 14	CAR	ATL	RSD		31st	1738	
1985	Freedlander Motorsports	18	Chevy	DAY	RCH	CAR	ATL	BRI	DAR	NWS	MAR	TAL	DOV	CLT; 20	RSD	POC	MCH; 21	DAY; 17	POC; 36	TAL; 30	MCH	BRI; 30	DAR; 33	RCH; 10	DOV; 26	MAR; 30	NWS; 11	CLT; 40	CAR; 30	ATL; 36	RSD				34th	1100	
1986	Freedlander Motorsports	18	Chevy	DAY; 19	RCH; 24	CAR; 14	ATL; 13	BRI; 11	DAR; 29	NWS	MAR; 24	TAL; 32	DOV; 9	CLT; 35	RSD	POC; 15	MCH; 14	DAY; 38	POC; 9	TAL; 34	GLN	MCH; 39	BRI; 12	DAR	RCH; 21	DOV; 8	MAR; 26	NWS; 13	CLT; 31	CAR; 35	ATL; 12	RSD			23rd	2393	
1987	Freedlander Motorsports	18	Chevy	DAY; DNQ	CAR; 38	RCH; 27	ATL; 17	DAR; 40	NWS	BRI	MAR	TAL	CLT	DOV	POC	RSD	MCH	DAY	POC	TAL	GLN	MCH	BRI	DAR	RCH	DOV	MAR	NWS	CLT	CAR	RSD	ATL			58th	286	
1988	Donlavey Racing	90	Ford	DAY	RCH	CAR	ATL	DAR	BRI	NWS	MAR	TAL	CLT	DOV	RSD	POC	MCH	DAY	POC	TAL	GLN	MCH	BRI; DNQ	DAR	RCH	DOV	MAR								91st	37	
1988	Winkle Motorsports	97	Buick																									CLT; 30	NWS	CAR	PHO	ATL; 42			91st	37	
1989	Wood Brothers Racing	1	Ford	DAY	CAR	ATL	RCH	DAR	BRI	NWS	MAR	TAL	CLT	DOV	SON	POC	MCH	DAY	POC	TAL	GLN	MCH	BRI; DNQ	DAR	RCH	DOV									66th	115	
1989	Wood Brothers Racing	21	Ford																								MAR; 29	CLT; 18	NWS; 16	CAR					66th	115	
1989	Hendrick Motorsports	18	Chevy																												PHO; DNQ	ATL			66th	115	
1990	Speed Racing	83	Olds	DAY	RCH; DNQ	CAR	ATL	DAR	BRI	NWS	MAR	TAL	CLT	DOV	SON	POC	MCH	DAY	POC	TAL	GLN	MCH	BRI	DAR	RCH	DOV; 31	MAR	NWS	CLT	CAR	PHO	ATL			106th	-	
1991	Junior Johnson & Associates	97	Ford	DAY	RCH	CAR	ATL	DAR	BRI	NWS	MAR	TAL	CLT; 16	DOV; 21	SON	POC	MCH	DAY	POC	TAL	GLN	MCH	BRI	DAR	RCH	DOV	MAR	NWS	CLT	CAR	PHO	ATL			70th	100	

===== Daytona 500 =====
Year	Team	Manufacturer	Start	Finish
1982	Gordon Racing	Buick	DNQ	
1986	Freelander Motorsports	Chevy	21	19
1987	Freelander Motorsports	Chevy	DNQ	

==== Busch Series ====
NASCAR Busch Series results
Year	Team	No.	Make	1	2	3	4	5	6	7	8	9	10	11	12	13	14	15	16	17	18	19	20	21	22	23	24	25	26	27	28	29	30	31	32	33	34	35	NBSC	Pts	Ref
1982	Ellis Racing	12	Pontiac	DAY; 22	RCH; 25		MAR; 33	DAR; 15	HCY; 20	SBO; 14	CRW; 11	RCH; 3	LGY; 16	DOV; 4	HCY; 10	CLT; 4	ASH; 2	**HCY**; 2	SBO; 16	CAR; 29	CRW; 7	SBO; 3	**HCY**; 2	**LGY**; 1	IRP; 2		HCY; 7	**RCH**; 15	MAR; 4	CLT; 38	HCY; 2	MAR; 25							3rd	3873	
1982	Ellis Racing	36	Pontiac			BRI; 3																				BRI; 4													3rd	3873	
1983	Ellis Racing	12	Pontiac	DAY; 7	RCH; 16	CAR; 11	**HCY**; 1*	MAR; 9	**NWS**; 13	**SBO**; 1	GPS; 24	**LGY**; 19	DOV; 8	BRI; 3	CLT; 34	SBO; 1*	**HCY**; 1*	ROU; 2	SBO; 1*	ROU; 16	CRW; 20	ROU; 6*	SBO; 1*	HCY; 3	LGY; 3	IRP; 5	GPS; 14	BRI; 3	**HCY**; 4*	DAR; 7	**RCH**; 2*	NWS; 1	SBO; 4	MAR; 25	ROU; 16*	CLT; 12	HCY; 19	MAR; 31	4th	4929	
1984	Ellis Racing	12	Olds	DAY; 35																																			24th	1440	
1984	Ellis Racing	12	Pontiac		**RCH**; 15	CAR; 27	**HCY**; 6	**MAR**; 29	DAR; 15	ROU; 2*	NSV	LGY	MLW	DOV	CLT	SBO; 23	HCY	ROU	SBO; 25	ROU; 12*	HCY	IRP	LGY	SBO; 3			**RCH**; 1*	NWS	CLT; 26	HCY	CAR	MAR							24th	1440	
1984	Ellis Racing	36	Pontiac																						BRI; 18	DAR													24th	1440	
1985	Ellis Racing	12	Olds	DAY; 10	CAR; 29				DAR; 22			DOV; 2	CLT; 9														CLT; 26	HCY	CAR										16th	2065	
1985	Ellis Racing	12	Pontiac			**HCY**; 23	**BRI**; 15	MAR; 3		SBO; 25	**LGY**; 1*			SBO; 1*	HCY	ROU	IRP	SBO	LGY; 1*	HCY	MLW	BRI	DAR	RCH; 1*	NWS	ROU				MAR; 1*									16th	2065	
1986	Ellis Racing	12	Pontiac	DAY; 31	CAR	HCY	MAR	BRI	DAR	SBO	LGY	JFC	DOV	CLT	SBO	HCY	ROU	IRP	SBO	RAL	OXF	SBO	HCY	LGY	ROU	BRI	DAR	RCH; 26	DOV	MAR	ROU	CLT	CAR	MAR					67th	155	
1987	Falk Racing	04	Pontiac	DAY	HCY	MAR; 30	DAR	BRI	LGY	SBO; 1	CLT			ROU; 21	JFC	OXF									RCH; 32														30th	1362	
1987	J&J Racing	58	Buick									DOV; 22												DAR; 11		DOV; 37		CLT; 19	CAR; 22										30th	1362	
1987	J&J Racing	58	Chevy										IRP; 27																										30th	1362	
1987	J&J Racing	58	Pontiac														SBO; 6	HCY	RAL	LGY; 26	ROU; 20	BRI	JFC				MAR; 28			MAR; 32									30th	1362	
1988	J&J Racing	99	Buick	DAY; 18	HCY; 4	CAR; 6	MAR; 22	DAR; 14	BRI; 2	**LNG**; 1*	NZH; 10	SBO; 3	NSV; 20	CLT; 12	DOV; 6	ROU; 6	LAN; 17	LVL; 1	MYB; 25*	OXF; 7	SBO; 2	HCY; 3	**LNG**; 1*	IRP; 3	ROU; 7	**BRI**; 24	DAR; 14	RCH; 4	DOV; 2	**MAR**; 15*	CLT; 6	CAR; 9	MAR; 3						1st	4281	
1989	J&J Racing	99	Buick	DAY; 39	CAR; 3	MAR; 1	HCY; 2	DAR; 16	BRI; 29	NZH; 2	SBO; 1*	LAN; 6	NSV; 7	CLT; 34	DOV; 5	ROU; 16	LVL; 21	VOL; 2	MYB; 9	SBO; 2	HCY; 1*	DUB; 12	IRP; 15	ROU; 3	BRI; 8	DAR; 6	**RCH**; 2	DOV; 12	MAR; 29	CLT; 16	CAR; 10	MAR; 10							3rd	3945	
1990	J&J Racing	99	Buick	DAY; 35	RCH; 10	CAR; 6	**MAR**; 9*	HCY; 2	DAR; 18	BRI; 21	LAN; 3	SBO; 15	NZH; 20	HCY; 14	CLT; 5	DOV; 33	ROU; 15	VOL; 14	**MYB**; 7*	OXF; 15	NHA; 1*	SBO; 7	DUB; 18	IRP; 16	ROU; 9	BRI; 9	DAR; 11	RCH; 15	**DOV**; 27	MAR; 27	CLT; 28	NHA; 5	CAR; 8	MAR; 12					6th	3829	
1991	Speedway Motorsports	56	Buick	DAY; 13	RCH; 30	CAR; 16	MAR; 23	VOL; 29	HCY; DNQ	DAR; 31	BRI	LAN	SBO	NZH	CLT	DOV	ROU	HCY	MYB	GLN	OXF																		33rd	1253	
1991	Ellis Racing	12	Buick																			NHA; 43	SBO	DUB	IRP	ROU	BRI	DAR	RCH; 18	DOV; 7	CLT; 4	NHA; 13	CAR; 40						33rd	1253	
1991	Ellis Racing	12	Chevy																															MAR; 26					33rd	1253	
1992	Ellis Racing	14	Chevy	DAY; DNQ	CAR	RCH; 20	ATL	MAR; 13	DAR	BRI	HCY	LAN	DUB	NZH	CLT						NHA; 33	TAL	IRP	ROU	MCH														43rd	841	
1992	Ellis Racing	14	Buick													DOV; 22	ROU																						43rd	841	
1992	Ellis Racing	23	Olds															MYB; 29	GLN	VOL																			43rd	841	
1992	Ellis Racing	12	Chevy																							NHA; 30	BRI	DAR	RCH; 35			MAR; 30	CAR						43rd	841	
1992	Ellis Racing	12	Buick																											DOV; 23	CLT								43rd	841	
1992	Ellis Racing	77	Chevy																															HCY; 28					43rd	841	
1993	Key Motorsports	05	Chevy	DAY	CAR	RCH	DAR	BRI	HCY	ROU	MAR	NZH	CLT	DOV	MYB	GLN	MLW	TAL	IRP	MCH	NHA	BRI	DAR	RCH	DOV	ROU	CLT	MAR; DNQ	CAR; DNQ	HCY; 5	ATL								76th	155	
1994	Key Motorsports	05	Chevy	DAY	CAR	RCH	ATL	MAR; 10	DAR	HCY; 30	BRI	ROU; 6	NHA	NZH	CLT; 16	DOV; 41	MYB; 34	GLN	MLW	SBO; 28	TAL	HCY	IRP	MCH	BRI	DAR	RCH; 38	DOV; 37	CLT	MAR	CAR								46th	753	
1995	Bobby Jones Racing	50	Ford	DAY	CAR	RCH	ATL	NSV	DAR	BRI	HCY	NHA	NZH	CLT	DOV	MYB	GLN	MLW	TAL	SBO	IRP; 17	MCH; 34	BRI	DAR	RCH	DOV	CLT	CAR	HOM										77th	173	

=== ARCA Permatex SuperCar Series ===
(key) (Bold – Pole position awarded by qualifying time. Italics – Pole position earned by points standings or practice time. * – Most laps led.)

ARCA Permatex SuperCar Series results
Year	Team	No.	Make	1	2	3	4	5	6	7	8	9	10	11	12	13	14	15	16	17	18	19	APSSC	Pts	Ref
1988	Hendrick Motorsports	18	Chevy	DAY	ATL	TAL	FRS	PCS	ROC	POC	WIN	KIL	ACS	SLM	POC	TAL	DEL	FRS	ISF	DSF	SLM	ATL; 2	102nd	-	

Preceded by Larry Pearson	NASCAR Busch Series Champion; 1988	Succeeded by Rob Moroso
