= 1989 Holly Farms 400 =

26th race of the 1989 NASCAR Winston Cup Series

Race details
- Race 26 of 29 in the 1989 NASCAR Winston Cup Series
- The 1989 Holly Farms 400 program cover, featuring Rusty Wallace.
- Date: October 15, 1989
- Official name: 40th Annual Holly Farms 400
- Location: North Wilkesboro Speedway, North Wilkesboro, North Carolina
- Course: Permanent racing facility
- Course length: 0.625 miles (1.006 km)
- Distance: 400 laps, 250 mi (402.336 km)
- Average speed: 90.269 miles per hour (145.274 km/h)

Pole position
Driver	Dale Earnhardt	Richard Childress Racing
- Time: Set by 1989 owner's points

Most laps led
Driver	Dale Earnhardt	Richard Childress Racing
- Laps: 343

Winner
No. 5	Geoff Bodine	Hendrick Motorsports

Television in the United States
- Network: ESPN
- Announcers: Bob Jenkins, Ned Jarrett, Benny Parsons

Radio in the United States
- Radio: Motor Racing Network

The 1989 Holly Farms 400 was the 26th stock car race of the 1989 NASCAR Winston Cup Series season and the 40th iteration of the event. The race was originally scheduled to be held on Sunday, October 1, 1989, but due to rain throughout the race's weekend, the race was postponed until Sunday, October 15. The race was held in North Wilkesboro, North Carolina at the North Wilkesboro Speedway, a 0.625 miles (1.006 km) oval short track. The race took the scheduled 400 laps to complete. On the final lap of the race, a battle between Richard Childress Racing driver Dale Earnhardt and King Racing driver Ricky Rudd that had been culminating since the final restart of the race on lap 398 came to a head. Heading into the first turn, Rudd would dive-bomb Earnhardt, which led Rudd into Earnhardt's car, spinning both cars. As a result of the spin, the third place driver at the time, Hendrick Motorsports driver Geoff Bodine, would manage to avoid the wreck and take the victory. The victory was Bodine's seventh career NASCAR Winston Cup Series victory and his only victory of the season. This would also prove to be Bodine's final win with Hendrick as Bofine would join Junior Johnson for 1990. Rudd and Earnhardt would finish ninth and tenth, respectively.

In the driver's championship points battle, leader Rusty Wallace was able to increase his lead over Earnhardt by two points to make his lead over Earnhardt 37 points with three races left in the season. Had Earnhardt either won or taken second in the race, Earnhardt would have retaken the driver's championship lead from Wallace.

== Background ==
The layout of North Wilkesboro Speedway, the venue where the race was held

North Wilkesboro Speedway is a short oval racetrack located on U.S. Route 421, about five miles east of the town of North Wilkesboro, North Carolina, or 80 miles north of Charlotte. It measures 0.625 mi (1.006 km) and features a unique uphill backstretch and downhill frontstretch. It has previously held races in NASCAR's top three series, including 93 Winston Cup Series races. The track, a NASCAR original, operated from 1949, NASCAR's inception, until the track's original closure in 1996. The speedway briefly reopened in 2010 and hosted several stock car series races before closing again in the spring of 2011. It was re-opened in August 2022 for grassroots racing.

=== Entry list ===
- (R) denotes rookie driver.

#	Driver	Team	Make	Sponsor
2	Ernie Irvan	U.S. Racing	Pontiac	Kroger
3	Dale Earnhardt	Richard Childress Racing	Chevrolet	GM Goodwrench Service Plus
4	Rick Wilson	Morgan–McClure Motorsports	Oldsmobile	Kodak
5	Geoff Bodine	Hendrick Motorsports	Chevrolet	Levi Garrett
6	Mark Martin	Roush Racing	Ford	Stroh's Light
7	Alan Kulwicki	AK Racing	Ford	Zerex
8	Bobby Hillin Jr.	Stavola Brothers Racing	Buick	Miller High Life
9	Bill Elliott	Melling Racing	Ford	Coors Light
10	Derrike Cope	Whitcomb Racing	Pontiac	Purolator
11	Terry Labonte	Junior Johnson & Associates	Ford	Budweiser
15	Brett Bodine	Bud Moore Engineering	Ford	Motorcraft
16	Larry Pearson (R)	Pearson Racing	Buick	Chattanooga Chew
17	Darrell Waltrip	Hendrick Motorsports	Chevrolet	Tide
21	Tommy Ellis	Wood Brothers Racing	Ford	Citgo
25	Ken Schrader	Hendrick Motorsports	Chevrolet	Folgers
26	Ricky Rudd	King Racing	Buick	Quaker State
27	Rusty Wallace	Blue Max Racing	Pontiac	Kodiak
28	Davey Allison	Robert Yates Racing	Ford	Texaco, Havoline
29	Dale Jarrett	Cale Yarborough Motorsports	Pontiac	Hardee's
30	Michael Waltrip	Bahari Racing	Pontiac	Country Time
33	Harry Gant	Jackson Bros. Motorsports	Oldsmobile	Skoal Bandit
42	Kyle Petty	SABCO Racing	Pontiac	Peak Antifreeze
43	Richard Petty	Petty Enterprises	Pontiac	STP
49	James Hylton	Hylton Motorsports	Buick	Hylton Motorsports
52	Jimmy Means	Jimmy Means Racing	Pontiac	Alka-Seltzer
55	Phil Parsons	Jackson Bros. Motorsports	Oldsmobile	Skoal, Crown Central Petroleum
57	Hut Stricklin (R)	Osterlund Racing	Pontiac	Heinz
62	Joe Ruttman	Douglas Smith Racing	Oldsmobile	Baja Boats
70	J. D. McDuffie	McDuffie Racing	Pontiac	Rumple Furniture
71	Dave Marcis	Marcis Auto Racing	Chevrolet	Lifebuoy
73	Dale Fischlein	Barkdoll Racing	Oldsmobile	Barkdoll Racing
75	Morgan Shepherd	RahMoc Enterprises	Pontiac	Valvoline
83	Lake Speed	Speed Racing	Oldsmobile	Bull's-Eye Barbecue Sauce
84	Dick Trickle (R)	Stavola Brothers Racing	Buick	Miller High Life
88	Jimmy Spencer (R)	Baker–Schiff Racing	Pontiac	Crisco
94	Sterling Marlin	Hagan Racing	Oldsmobile	Sunoco

== Qualifying ==
Qualifying was originally scheduled to be split into two rounds. The first round was scheduled to be run on Friday, September 29, at 3:00 PM EST. 31 cars would manage to set times in the session before the session was stopped due to rain. Originally, qualifying would have been condensed into one round and ran the next day on Saturday, September 30. However, due to persistent rain, qualifying was cancelled and the lineup was set by the current 1989 owner's points. As a result, Richard Childress Racing driver Dale Earnhardt would win the pole.

Four drivers would fail to qualify.

=== Full qualifying results ===
Pos.	#	Driver	Team	Make
1	3	Dale Earnhardt	Richard Childress Racing	Chevrolet
2	27	Rusty Wallace	Blue Max Racing	Pontiac
3	6	Mark Martin	Roush Racing	Ford
4	17	Darrell Waltrip	Hendrick Motorsports	Chevrolet
5	26	Ricky Rudd	King Racing	Buick
6	9	Bill Elliott	Melling Racing	Ford
7	25	Ken Schrader	Hendrick Motorsports	Chevrolet
8	28	Davey Allison	Robert Yates Racing	Ford
9	11	Terry Labonte	Junior Johnson & Associates	Ford
10	33	Harry Gant	Jackson Bros. Motorsports	Oldsmobile
11	5	Geoff Bodine	Hendrick Motorsports	Chevrolet
12	94	Sterling Marlin	Hagan Racing	Oldsmobile
13	75	Morgan Shepherd	RahMoc Enterprises	Pontiac
14	4	Rick Wilson	Morgan–McClure Motorsports	Oldsmobile
15	21	Tommy Ellis	Wood Brothers Racing	Ford
16	84	Dick Trickle (R)	Stavola Brothers Racing	Buick
17	7	Alan Kulwicki	AK Racing	Ford
18	30	Michael Waltrip	Bahari Racing	Pontiac
19	15	Brett Bodine	Bud Moore Engineering	Ford
20	8	Bobby Hillin Jr.	Stavola Brothers Racing	Buick
21	83	Lake Speed	Speed Racing	Oldsmobile
22	55	Phil Parsons	Jackson Bros. Motorsports	Oldsmobile
23	2	Ernie Irvan	U.S. Racing	Pontiac
24	16	Larry Pearson (R)	Pearson Racing	Buick
25	29	Dale Jarrett	Cale Yarborough Motorsports	Pontiac
26	57	Hut Stricklin (R)	Osterlund Racing	Pontiac
27	71	Dave Marcis	Marcis Auto Racing	Chevrolet
28	88	Jimmy Spencer (R)	Baker–Schiff Racing	Pontiac
29	43	Richard Petty	Petty Enterprises	Pontiac
30	10	Derrike Cope	Whitcomb Racing	Pontiac
Provisionals
31	42	Kyle Petty	SABCO Racing	Pontiac
32	52	Jimmy Means	Jimmy Means Racing	Pontiac
Failed to qualify
33	70	J. D. McDuffie	McDuffie Racing	Pontiac
34	62	Joe Ruttman	Douglas Smith Racing	Oldsmobile
35	49	James Hylton	Hylton Motorsports	Buick
36	73	Dale Fischlein	Barkdoll Racing	Oldsmobile
Official interrupted first round qualifying results
Official starting lineup

== Race results ==
Fin	St	#	Driver	Team	Make	Laps	Led	Status	Pts	Winnings
1	11	5	Geoff Bodine	Hendrick Motorsports	Chevrolet	400	1	running	180	$47,800
2	3	6	Mark Martin	Roush Racing	Ford	400	51	running	175	$28,075
3	9	11	Terry Labonte	Junior Johnson & Associates	Ford	400	0	running	165	$18,300
4	10	33	Harry Gant	Jackson Bros. Motorsports	Oldsmobile	400	0	running	160	$12,775
5	13	75	Morgan Shepherd	RahMoc Enterprises	Pontiac	400	0	running	155	$15,200
6	6	9	Bill Elliott	Melling Racing	Ford	400	0	running	150	$13,570
7	2	27	Rusty Wallace	Blue Max Racing	Pontiac	400	0	running	146	$11,880
8	23	2	Ernie Irvan	U.S. Racing	Pontiac	400	5	running	147	$6,792
9	5	26	Ricky Rudd	King Racing	Buick	400	0	running	138	$8,630
10	1	3	Dale Earnhardt	Richard Childress Racing	Chevrolet	400	343	running	144	$15,155
11	17	7	Alan Kulwicki	AK Racing	Ford	398	0	running	130	$5,875
12	16	84	Dick Trickle (R)	Stavola Brothers Racing	Buick	398	0	running	127	$6,275
13	7	25	Ken Schrader	Hendrick Motorsports	Chevrolet	397	0	running	124	$7,150
14	27	71	Dave Marcis	Marcis Auto Racing	Chevrolet	396	0	running	121	$5,295
15	20	8	Bobby Hillin Jr.	Stavola Brothers Racing	Buick	395	0	running	118	$5,650
16	15	21	Tommy Ellis	Wood Brothers Racing	Ford	394	0	running	115	$4,900
17	19	15	Brett Bodine	Bud Moore Engineering	Ford	394	0	running	112	$4,775
18	28	88	Jimmy Spencer (R)	Baker–Schiff Racing	Pontiac	393	0	running	109	$4,900
19	12	94	Sterling Marlin	Hagan Racing	Oldsmobile	391	0	running	106	$4,425
20	4	17	Darrell Waltrip	Hendrick Motorsports	Chevrolet	388	0	running	103	$10,125
21	8	28	Davey Allison	Robert Yates Racing	Ford	379	0	running	100	$8,930
22	32	52	Jimmy Means	Jimmy Means Racing	Pontiac	373	0	running	97	$1,805
23	18	30	Michael Waltrip	Bahari Racing	Pontiac	368	0	running	94	$4,130
24	24	16	Larry Pearson (R)	Pearson Racing	Buick	312	0	running	91	$2,555
25	21	83	Lake Speed	Speed Racing	Oldsmobile	304	0	running	88	$4,025
26	30	10	Derrike Cope	Whitcomb Racing	Pontiac	296	0	running	85	$2,380
27	25	29	Dale Jarrett	Cale Yarborough Motorsports	Pontiac	218	0	overheating	82	$3,830
28	22	55	Phil Parsons	Jackson Bros. Motorsports	Oldsmobile	199	0	crash	79	$3,755
29	14	4	Rick Wilson	Morgan–McClure Motorsports	Oldsmobile	181	0	ignition	76	$2,130
30	26	57	Hut Stricklin (R)	Osterlund Racing	Pontiac	177	0	running	73	$1,630
31	31	42	Kyle Petty	SABCO Racing	Pontiac	124	0	distributor	70	$1,580
32	29	43	Richard Petty	Petty Enterprises	Pontiac	124	0	crash	67	$2,330
Failed to qualify
33		70	J. D. McDuffie	McDuffie Racing	Pontiac					
34		62	Joe Ruttman	Douglas Smith Racing	Oldsmobile					
35		49	James Hylton	Hylton Motorsports	Buick					
36		73	Dale Fischlein	Barkdoll Racing	Oldsmobile					
Official race results

== Standings after the race ==
Drivers' Championship standings

	Pos	Driver	Points
	1	Rusty Wallace	3,758
	2	Dale Earnhardt	3,721 (-37)
	3	Mark Martin	3,630 (-128)
	4	Darrell Waltrip	3,476 (–282)
	5	Bill Elliott	3,394 (–364)
	6	Ken Schrader	3,332 (–426)
	7	Ricky Rudd	3,317 (–441)
1	8	Harry Gant	3,275 (–483)
1	9	Davey Allison	3,252 (–506)
	10	Terry Labonte	3,230 (–528)
Official driver's standings

- Note: Only the first 10 positions are included for the driver standings.

Previous race: 1989 All Pro Auto Parts 500	NASCAR Winston Cup Series; 1989 season	Next race: 1989 AC Delco 500
