= Melling Racing =

Former NASCAR team

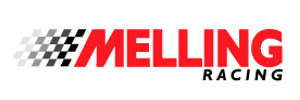
- Owners: Harry Melling (1982–1999); Mark Melling (1999–2002)
- Base: Concord, North Carolina; Dawsonville, Georgia
- Series: Winston Cup
- Race drivers: Bill Elliott; Jerry Nadeau; Lake Speed; Stacy Compton
- Manufacturer: Ford (1982–2000); Dodge (2001–2002)
- Opened: 1982
- Closed: 2003

Career
- Debut: 1982 Daytona 500 (Daytona)
- Latest race: 2002 Pepsi 400 by Farmer Jack (Michigan International Speedway)
- Races competed: 545
- Drivers' Championships: 1
- Race victories: 34
- Pole positions: 41

Melling Racing was a Championship-winning NASCAR Winston Cup Series race team owned by Harry Melling and his son Mark Melling. Harry Melling ran the team from its inception in 1982, to mid-1999. When Harry died after a heart attack in mid-1999, his son Mark then took over Melling Racing until the team closed in 2003. The team was most notable for fielding cars for Bill Elliott in the 1980s, where he won the 1985 Southern 500 at Darlington to claim the first ever Winston Million bonus, claiming the fastest qualifying lap in NASCAR history at Talladega Superspeedway with a lap of 212.809 mph in 1987, and winning the 1988 Winston Cup championship. Melling won 34 career NASCAR Winston Cup races, all of them with Bill Elliott.

== History ==
=== Car Nos. 9 and 92 history ===
==== Bill Elliott and success (1982–1991) ====
In 1982 the team became Melling Racing after Harry Melling bought the team from George Elliott on December 1, 1981, Melling first became involved in NASCAR when his company Melling Tool sponsored Benny Parsons in 1979. Melling Racing ran 21 races with Bill Elliott in 1982 and had nine top-tens and won the pole for the Champion Spark Plug 400.

In 1983, Elliott won his first race in the season finale at Riverside International Raceway and finished third in points. The following season, Coors became the team's new sponsor and Melling Racing responded with three wins with Elliott and another third-place points finish. 1985 was a phenomenal year for Elliott and Melling, marking a season-and-career-high 11 poles and 11 wins, with 7 of those 11 wins coming from the pole, as well as over $2 million in earnings. During the 1984 Winston Cup Awards Ceremony, RJ Reynolds and Winston announced that starting in 1985, if a driver won 3 of the 4 crown jewel events in the same year, they would receive a million dollar bonus from the company. The 4 events are the Daytona 500, Winston 500, Coca-Cola 600, and the Southern 500. Most drivers thought it would be impossible to do so, but Bill Elliott would accomplish that feat in 1985. Elliott won the Daytona 500, Winston 500 (where he lost 2 laps, but made both laps up under green and eventually won the race), and the Southern 500. Elliott won the Winston Million in its very first year running, earning him the nickname "Million Dollar Bill". The only major of the four he did not win in 1985 was the Coca-Cola 600 (a driver needed only to win a "small slam" of the four majors to win the bonus; Elliott, since he retired in 2013, would not finish a Career Grand Slam). Elliott is one of only 2 drivers to win the bonus, with the other driver being Jeff Gordon, who won the Winston Million in its final running in 1997. The winning of the bonus was the rise of Bill Elliott being NASCAR's Most Popular Driver. With his win at Darlington, along with the Winston Million bonus, Elliott had 10 races won so far, but in the next 4 races after Darlington however, he would struggle and finish poorly. He did not finish in the top 10 since the Darlington win. Elliott was in jeopardy of not winning the championship. Elliott would finally overcome his slump, and he won his 11th and final race of the season in the November race at Atlanta, putting him back in the championship hunt. With the win at Atlanta, Bill Elliott would set a NASCAR modern era record for completing the season sweep at 4 different tracks in a season: Pocono, Michigan, Darlington, & Atlanta. The next race after the Atlanta win would be the final race of 1985. Elliott went into Riverside 2nd in points, only 20 points behind Darrell Waltrip, giving him a shot to rebound for the championship after a string of poor finishes in 4 of the last 5 races. During the race however, Elliott would suffer early transmission problems, and it would unfortunately cost him the championship. He finished the race in 31st. Waltrip finished in 7th, gaining 81 points on Elliott. Darrell Waltrip clinched his 3rd and final Winston Cup title, having won only 3 races to Bill Elliott's 11. Elliott would officially lose the championship by 101 points. This would be the 1st time in Bob Latford's Winston Cup points system that a driver winning 10 or more races in a season failed to win the championship due to poor finishes and lack of consistency in the final stretch of the season. The team would slip to 4th in points in 1986 and won only two races, both coming at Michigan. Even though both wins were at Michigan, Bill Elliott would become the 1st driver in NASCAR history to win 4 straight superspeedway races at one track, doing so at Michigan with season sweeps in 1985 and 1986. Elliott and Melling rallied back in 1987 by winning 6 races, and starting off the year by winning the Daytona 500 for the 2nd time. During the season in May, Bill Elliott would run the fastest qualifying lap in NASCAR history at Talladega Superspeedway for the Winston 500 with a lap of 212.809 mph. Due to NASCAR mandating restrictor plates the following year to keep the drivers from going over 200 mph, this record will never be matched. They would finish the year 2nd in points to Dale Earnhardt, who scored 11 wins, by 489 points. Bill Elliott and Melling Racing would finally win the NASCAR Winston Cup Series championship in 1988 after winning 6 races for the 2nd straight season and scoring 22 top-ten finishes. Elliott won the title by only 24 points over Rusty Wallace, who also won 6 races.

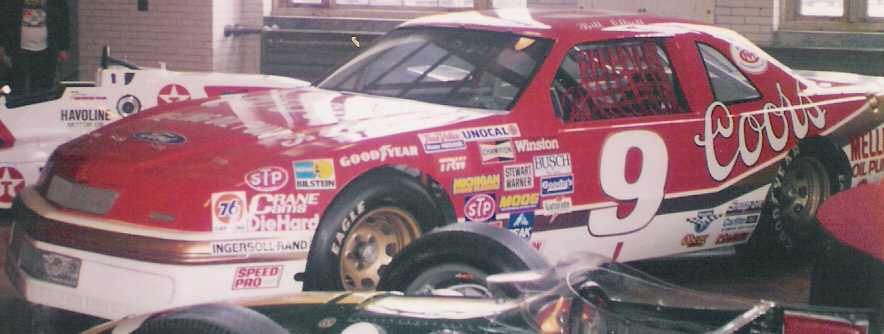
Melling Racing car that set the record for the fastest recorded time in a stock car - 212.809 mph at Talladega Superspeedway

The team was unable to defend its championship in 1989 after Elliott was injured early in the season and Jody Ridley served as a substitute driver. Elliott still managed to win three races that year, but the defending Winston Cup champions fell to 6th in points. In 1990, Elliott had only one victory, winning at Dover, but rebounded to finish 4th in points. In 1991, there would be a bit of a change in the team's identity: the sponsorship would change from Coors to Coors Light, and the colors would also change from the team's iconic red to blue. They would only win one race that season, the Pepsi 400 at Daytona. Bill Elliott had a very rough year, and fell to a disappointing 11th in points, causing him and Coors to part ways with Melling at the end of the 1991 season. The 1991 Pepsi 400 at Daytona would be the only race in his career that Bill Elliott won in a car that was not painted red. The Pepsi 400 would also be the team's 34th and final career Winston Cup win. Overall, Melling Racing won 34 races in 9 seasons, along with winning the 1985 Winston Million, setting the fastest qualifying lap ever in 1987 at Talladega, and winning the 1988 NASCAR Winston Cup championship, all of those accomplishments with only Bill Elliott. The prime years would unfortunately come to an end for the team. Elliott however, would still be successful in the years to come.

==== Struggles, Harry Melling's death, and closing (1992–2003) ====
Without sponsorship, Melling ran Phil Parsons for the first two races in the 1992 season and had a top-ten finish at the Daytona 500. After that, the team ran a part-time schedule with Dorsey Schroeder, Dave Mader III, and Bill Schmitt driving, before Chad Little finished the season. The team continued running a part-time schedule with Little and Greg Sacks driving at the beginning of the season, along with P. J. Jones in the second half of the season. After Joe Ruttman drove at Daytona, Rich Bickle drove for ten races and had only one top-20 finish, causing him to be replaced by Parsons later on. The team finally got a new sponsor in Spam when Lake Speed signed with the team in 1995. He had two top-ten finishes and finished 23rd in points running a full-time schedule. After only one top-ten in 1996, Spam left the team.

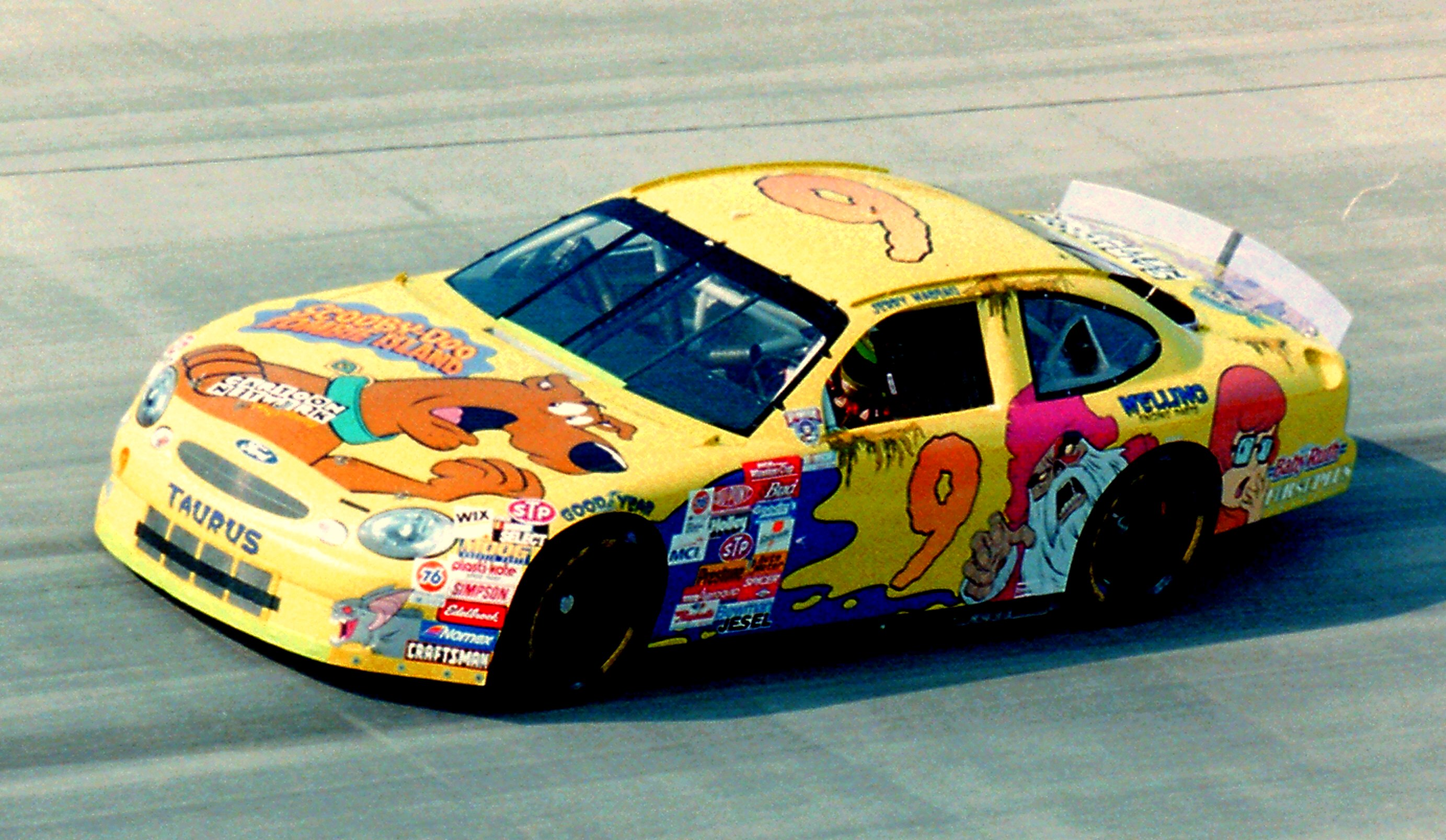
Nadeau in the Melling Racing No. 9 at Dover, 1998

Due to a lack of sponsorship, the team skipped races, and ran a total of 26 events with Speed driving 25 and Jeff Davis running at Sears Point. Melling was able to return full-time in 1998 when Cartoon Network became the team's new sponsor. While practicing at Sears Point, Speed was involved a wreck and had to be replaced by Butch Gilliland that weekend while he recuperated. After returning for a final race at New Hampshire, Speed retired from driving and was replaced immediately by rookie Jerry Nadeau, who had a best finish of 15th at Watkins Glen International. Nadeau returned for the 1999 season, with Turner Broadcasting taking a larger role in its sponsorship duties, advertising TBS, Dinner and a Movie, WCW, and the Atlanta Braves in addition to their Cartoon Network sponsorship. Midway through the season, Harry Melling died due to a heart attack, and his son Mark took over ownership of the team. At Watkins Glen that season, Nadeau gave Melling Racing its first top-five since 1991 with a fifth-place finish, but left after the following week to replace Ernie Irvan at MB2 Motorsports. For the rest of the season, Bickle, Steve Grissom, and Stacy Compton all shared the ride.

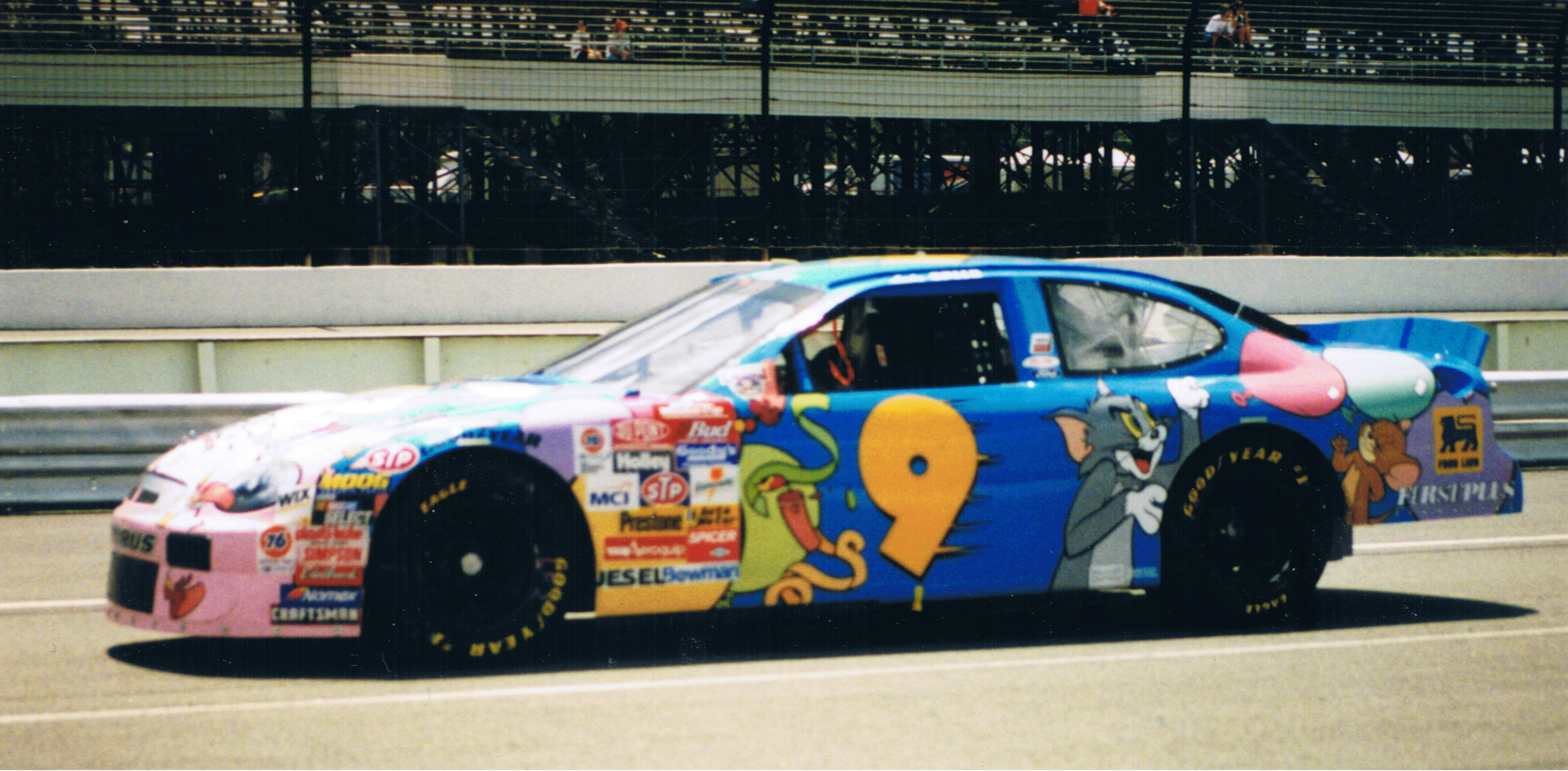
Lake Speed in the Cartoon Network No. 9 Ford, about to qualify for the Pocono Raceway Winston Cup Race, June 1998.

Compton was hired as the driver for 2000 with Kodiak/Tobacco replacing Cartoon and Turner as the sponsor. In his rookie season, Compton was unable to finish higher than 16th, had to miss the goracing.com 500 due to injuries, and was replaced by Bobby Hillin Jr. for that race. In 2001, Melling yielded the No. 9 to Evernham Motorsports, who would be fielding entries for, Bill Elliott. When Ray Evernham took possession of the number 9 from Melling, Elliott asked him for that number out of respect for his old team. In exchange, Melling Racing switched to the No. 92 and ran Dodge Intrepids with engine support from Evernham. Compton also received new crew chief Chad Knaus, leading to the departure of Jerry Pitts. Compton qualified on the outside pole at the season-opening Daytona 500, started on the front row with Elliott, who won the pole, and finished 10th in the race. Compton won 2 poles in 2001, both at Talladega. After finishing 33rd in points at the end of the season, Compton, Kodiak, and Knaus left Melling. In a twist of fate for the team, Elliott won at Homestead in November 2001, driving the number 9 car, but this time, with Evernham Motorsports. It was the 9 car's first since he and Melling Racing took the No. 9 to victory lane at the Pepsi 400 in 1991.

Melling began the 2002 season at Daytona with Robert Pressley driving, finishing 22nd in the Brand Source Dodge after a late race engine failure. The team did not run until the summer Michigan race with Compton finishing 30th. The team's final attempt came at Talladega with Pressley, but they did not qualify. In the team's final race, Stacy Compton led three laps.

At the end of the 2002 season, Melling Racing closed its doors for good and eventually sold its shop and equipment to Arnold Motorsports in 2003.

== Team results ==
Year	Driver	No.	Make	1	2	3	4	5	6	7	8	9	10	11	12	13	14	15	16	17	18	19	20	21	22	23	24	25	26	27	28	29	30	31	32	33	34	35	36	Owners	Pts
1982	Bill Elliott	9	Ford	DAY; 5	RCH; 12	BRI	ATL; 21	CAR; 23	DAR; 3	NWS	MAR	TAL; 26	NSV; 11	DOV	CLT; 2	POC; 19	RSD	MCH; 3	DAY; 2	NSV; 21	POC; 30	TAL; 6	MCH; 27	BRI	DAR; 4	RCH	DOV; 3	NWS	CLT; 2	MAR	CAR; 12	ATL; 24	RSD; 25							25th	2558
1983	Bill Elliott	9	Ford	DAY; 2	RCH; 6	CAR; 2	ATL; 30	DAR; 5	NWS; 21	MAR; 21	TAL; 5	NSV; 5	DOV; 4	BRI; 8	CLT; 16	RSD; 2	POC; 6	MCH; 25	DAY; 7	NSV; 7	POC; 6	TAL; 8	MCH; 3	BRI; 27	DAR; 2	RCH; 4	DOV; 8	MAR; 14	NWS; 4	CLT; 8	CAR; 21	ATL; 6	RSD; 1							3rd	4279
1984	Bill Elliott	9	Ford	DAY; 5	RCH; 4	CAR; 8	ATL; 11	BRI; 9	NWS; 10	DAR; 3	MAR; 7	TAL; 9	NSV; 20	DOV; 4	CLT; 28	RSD; 10	POC; 4	MCH; 1	DAY; 6	NSV; 7	POC; 3	TAL; 10	MCH; 3	BRI; 6	DAR; 15	RCH; 24	DOV; 32	MAR; 3	CLT; 1	NWS; 8	CAR; 1	ATL; 2	RSD; 4							3rd	4377
1985	Bill Elliott	9	Ford	DAY; 1^{*}	RCH; 22	CAR; 29	ATL; 1^{*}	BRI; 11	DAR; 1^{*}	NWS; 6	MAR; 13	TAL; 1	DOV; 1^{*}	CLT; 18	RSD; 6	POC; 1	MCH; 1^{*}	DAY; 2^{*}	POC; 1	TAL; 4^{*}	MCH; 1	BRI; 5	DAR; 1	RCH; 12	DOV; 20	MAR; 17	NWS; 30	CLT; 2	CAR; 4	ATL; 1^{*}	RSD; 31									2nd	4191
1986	Bill Elliott	9	Ford	DAY; 13	RCH; 21	CAR; 7	ATL; 5	BRI; 5	DAR; 8	NWS; 9	MAR; 31	TAL; 24^{*}	DOV; 7	CLT; 6^{*}	RSD; 11	POC; 5	MCH; 1	DAY; 16	POC; 35	TAL; 27	GLN; 4	MCH; 1^{*}	BRI; 19	DAR; 3	RCH; 9	DOV; 27	MAR; 11	NWS; 16	CLT; 7	CAR; 7	ATL; 3	RSD; 23								4th	3844
1987	Bill Elliott	9	Ford	DAY; 1^{*}	CAR; 4	RCH; 4	ATL; 28	DAR; 2	NWS; 10	BRI; 4^{*}	MAR; 6	TAL; 22	CLT; 23^{*}	DOV; 2	POC; 2	RSD; 5	MCH; 34	DAY; 12	POC; 32	TAL; 1	GLN; 28	MCH; 1	BRI; 9	DAR; 8	RCH; 4	DOV; 4	MAR; 11	NWS; 3	CLT; 1	CAR; 1^{*}	RSD; 23	ATL; 1^{*}								2nd	4207
1988	Bill Elliott	9	Ford	DAY; 12	RCH; 12	CAR; 6	ATL; 19	DAR; 4	BRI; 1	NWS; 10	MAR; 11	TAL; 7	CLT; 19	DOV; 1^{*}	RSD; 16	POC; 10	MCH; 2	DAY; 1	POC; 1^{*}	TAL; 8	GLN; 3	MCH; 3	BRI; 2	DAR; 1^{*}	RCH; 7	DOV; 1^{*}	MAR; 6	CLT; 4	NWS; 5	CAR; 4^{*}	PHO; 4	ATL; 11								1st	4488
1989	Bill Elliott	9	Ford	DAY; 35	CAR; 19	ATL; 11	RCH; 10	DAR; 6	BRI; 9	NWS; 22	MAR; 20	TAL; 11	CLT; 5	DOV; 8	SON; 3	POC; 21	MCH; 1	DAY; 4^{*}	POC; 1	TAL; 12	GLN; 18	MCH; 39	BRI; 24	DAR; 7	RCH; 18	DOV; 4	MAR; 15	CLT; 4^{*}	NWS; 6	CAR; 15	PHO; 1	ATL; 27								6th	3774
1990	Bill Elliott	9	Ford	DAY; 3	RCH; 4	CAR; 33	ATL; 12	DAR; 7	BRI; 17	NWS; 18	MAR; 10	TAL; 22	CLT; 2	DOV; 8	SON; 21	POC; 16	MCH; 25^{*}	DAY; 29	POC; 2	TAL; 2	GLN; 12	MCH; 4	BRI; 13	DAR; 4	RCH; 4	DOV; 1^{*}	MAR; 8	NWS; 4	CLT; 15^{*}	CAR; 2	PHO; 5	ATL; 15^{*}								4th	3999
1991	Bill Elliott	9	Ford	DAY; 28	RCH; 30	CAR; 5	ATL; 2^{*}	DAR; 12	BRI; 28	NWS; 8	MAR; 26	TAL; 8	CLT; 26	DOV; 13	SON; 20	POC; 36	MCH; 11	DAY; 1	POC; 9	TAL; 2	GLN; 7	MCH; 5	BRI; 21	DAR; 18	RCH; 9	DOV; 11	MAR; 27	NWS; 24	CLT; 11	CAR; 10	PHO; 25	ATL; 3								11th	3535
1992	Phil Parsons	9	Ford	DAY; 10	CAR; 30	RCH																																		30th	1881
1992	Dorsey Schroeder	9	Ford				ATL; 35																																	30th	1881
1992	Dave Mader III	9	Ford					DAR; 34	BRI; 16	NWS; DNQ	MAR; 21	TAL; 18	CLT; 39																											30th	1881
1992	Chad Little	9	Ford											DOV; 26	SON	POC; 37	MCH; 21	DAY; 24	POC; 17	TAL; 8	GLN	MCH; 17	BRI	DAR; 34	RCH; 27	DOV; 29	MAR	NWS	CLT; 33	CAR; 24	PHO	ATL; 17								30th	1881
1993	Chad Little	9	Ford	DAY; 24	CAR	RCH								CLT; 34																										38th	942
1993	Greg Sacks	9	Ford				ATL; 23	DAR	BRI	NWS																														38th	942
1993	P. J. Jones	9	Ford								MAR; DNQ	TAL; DNQ	SON; 25		DOV; 34	POC	MCH; 38	DAY; 30	NHA	POC	TAL	GLN; 8	MCH; 26	BRI; DNQ	DAR	RCH	DOV; DNQ	MAR	NWS	CLT	CAR	PHO	ATL; DNQ							38th	942
1994	Joe Ruttman	9	Ford	DAY; 18																																				42nd	1103
1994	Rich Bickle	9	Ford		CAR; 41	CAR	ATL; 37	DAR; 23	BRI	NWS; DNQ	MAR	TAL; DNQ	SON	CLT; 34	DOV	POC; 28	MCH; 30	DAY; 20	NHA; 21	POC; 34	TAL	IND; 29	GLN																	42nd	1103
1994	Phil Parsons	9	Ford																					MCH; 31	BRI	DAR; 15	RCH; DNQ	DOV	MAR	NWS; 36	CLT; DNQ	CAR	PHO	ATL						42nd	1103
1995	Lake Speed	9	Ford	DAY; 14	CAR; 32	RCH; 14	ATL; 15	DAR; 29	BRI; 17	NWS; 25	MAR; 26	TAL; 16	SON; 40	CLT; 8	DOV; 34	POC; 28	MCH; 11	DAY; 21	NHA; 24	POC; 22	TAL; 35	IND; 34	GLN; 20	MCH; 17	BRI; 29	DAR; 9	RCH; 21	DOV; 32	MAR; 20	NWS; 35	CLT; 21	CAR; 24	PHO; 22	ATL; 19						23rd	2921
1996	Lake Speed	9	Ford	DAY; 14	CAR; 25	RCH; 18	ATL; 41	DAR; 25	BRI; 35	NWS; 35	MAR; 11	TAL; 42	SON; 16	CLT; 35	DOV; 26	POC; 34	MCH; 19	DAY; 29	NHA; 24	POC; 8	TAL; 30	IND; 13	GLN; 17	MCH; 32	BRI; 16	DAR; 10	RCH; 31	DOV; 13	MAR; 28	NWS; 25	CLT; 12	CAR; 35	PHO; 28	ATL; 19						23rd	2834
1997	Lake Speed	9	Ford	DAY; 24	CAR; 15	RCH; 12	ATL; 22	DAR; 36	TEX; 16	BRI; 36	MAR; 25		TAL; 21	CLT; 24	DOV	POC	MCH; 11	CAL; 20	DAY; 29	NHA	POC	IND; 12	GLN	MCH; 21	BRI; 29	DAR; 18	RCH; 36	NHA; 18	DOV	MAR; 14	CLT; 38	TAL; 36	CAR; 17	PHO; 37	ATL; 26					35th	2301
1997	Jeff Davis	9	Ford									SON; 37																												35th	2301
1998	Lake Speed	9	Ford	DAY; 17	CAR; 27	LVS; 32	ATL; 28	DAR; 25	BRI; 31	TEX; 20	MAR; 20	TAL; 25	CAL; 32	CLT; 27	DOV; 36	RCH; 26	MCH; 25	POC; 25		NHA; 41																				34th	2130
1998	Butch Gilliland	9	Ford																SON; 24																					34th	2130
1998	Jerry Nadeau	9	Ford																		POC; 26	IND; 26	GLN; 15	MCH; 30	BRI; 32	NHA; 29	DAR; 32	RCH; 23	DOV; 36	MAR; 35	CLT; 35	TAL; 42	DAY; 19	PHO; 39	CAR; 24	ATL; 37				34th	2130
1999	Jerry Nadeau	9	Ford	DAY; 11	CAR; 31	LVS; 31	ATL; 27	DAR; 40	TEX; 24	BRI; 42	MAR; 32	TAL; 8	CAL; 20	RCH; 21	CLT; 20	DOV; 30	MCH; 26	POC; 23	SON; 34	DAY; 37	NHA; 36	POC; 38	IND; 31	GLN; 5	MCH; 29															34th	2686
1999	Steve Grissom	9	Ford																							BRI; 39	DAR; 39	RCH; 30												34th	2686
1999	Rich Bickle	9	Ford																										NHA; 20	DOV; 36	MAR; 37	CLT; 39	TAL; 41							34th	2686
1999	Stacy Compton	9	Ford																															CAR; 36	PHO; 39	HOM; 30	ATL; DNQ			34th	2686
2000	Stacy Compton	9	Ford	DAY; 26	CAR; 34	LVS; 32	ATL; 35	DAR; 29	BRI; 28	TEX; 36	MAR; 39	TAL; 33	CAL; 28	RCH; 22	CLT; 33	DOV; 30	MCH; 42	POC; 37	SON; 31	DAY; 39	NHA; 29	POC; 35	IND; 37	GLN; 29	MCH; DNQ		DAR; DNQ	RCH; 24	NHA; 16	DOV; 29	MAR; 39	CLT; DNQ	TAL; 23	CAR; DNQ	PHO; DNQ	HOM; 38	ATL; DNQ			38th	1857
2000	Bobby Hillin Jr.	9	Ford																							BRI; 40														38th	1857
2001	Stacy Compton	92	Dodge	DAY; 10	CAR; 41	LVS; 27	ATL; 24	DAR; 43	BRI; 11	TEX; 15	MAR; 15	TAL; 43	CAL; 38	RCH; 29	CLT; 34	DOV; 32	MCH; DNQ	POC; 23	SON; 24	DAY; 32	CHI; 26	NHA; 31	POC; 32	IND; 33	GLN; 20	MCH; 21	BRI; DNQ	DAR; 42	RCH; 22	DOV; 24	KAN; 34	CLT; 32	MAR; 16	TAL; 11	PHO; 21	CAR; 36	HOM; 43	ATL; 18	NHA; 34	33rd	2752
2002	Robert Pressley	92	Dodge	DAY; 22	CAR	LVS	ATL	DAR	BRI	TEX	MAR	TAL	CAL	RCH	CLT	DOV	POC	MCH	SON	DAY	CHI	NHA	POC	IND	GLN								TAL; DNQ	CLT	MAR	ATL	CAR	PHO	HOM	67th	97
2002	Stacy Compton	92	Dodge																							MCH; 30	BRI	DAR	RCH	NHA	DOV	KAN								67th	97
