= Ronnie Hopkins =

American racing driver

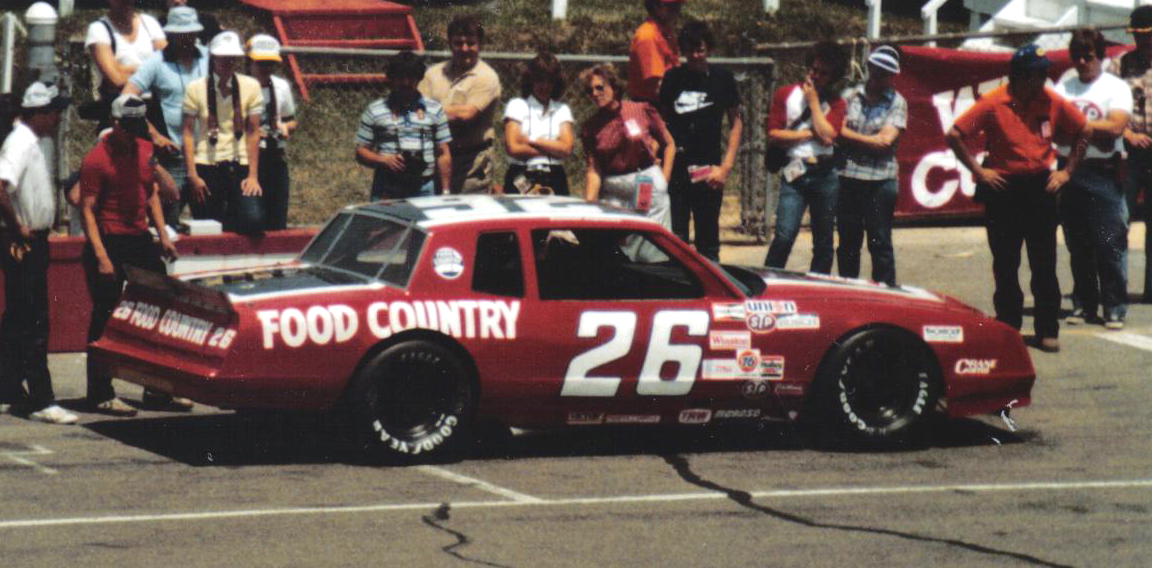
- Hopkins' car in 1983
- Born: March 9, 1962 (age 64); Greenville, South Carolina, U.S.

NASCAR Cup Series career
- 13 races run over 1 year
- 1983 position: 31st
- Best finish: 31st (1983)
- First race: 1983 Daytona 500 (Daytona)
- Last race: 1983 Southern 500 (Darlington)
Wins	Top tens	Poles
0	0	0

NASCAR O'Reilly Auto Parts Series career
- 4 races run over 1 year
- Best finish: 57th (1982)
- First race: 1982 Spring 220 (Richmond)
- Last race: 1982 Autumn 150 (Martinsville)
Wins	Top tens	Poles
0	0	0

Ronnie Hopkins (born March 9, 1962) is an American former professional stock car racing driver. He has raced in the NASCAR Winston Cup Series and the NASCAR Budweiser Late Model Sportsman Series.

== Motorsports career results ==
=== NASCAR ===
(key) (Bold – Pole position awarded by qualifying time. Italics – Pole position earned by points standings or practice time. * – Most laps led.)

==== Winston Cup Series ====
NASCAR Winston Cup Series results
Year	Team	No.	Make	1	2	3	4	5	6	7	8	9	10	11	12	13	14	15	16	17	18	19	20	21	22	23	24	25	26	27	28	29	30	NWCC	Pts	Ref
1983	Henderson Motorsports	26	Buick	DAY; 19	RCH	CAR; 17	ATL; 21	DAR; 30	NWS; 24	MAR; 30	TAL	NSV; 29	DOV; 26	BRI; 17	CLT	RSD	POC; 26	MCH; 17	DAY	NSV	POC	TAL	MCH	BRI; 28	DAR; 40	RCH	DOV	MAR	NWS	CLT	CAR	ATL	RSD	31st	1147	

==== Budweiser Late Model Sportsman Series ====
NASCAR Budweiser Late Model Sportsman Series results
Year	Team	No.	Make	1	2	3	4	5	6	7	8	9	10	11	12	13	14	15	16	17	18	19	20	21	22	23	24	25	26	27	28	29	NBLMSSC	Pts	Ref
1982		55	Pontiac	DAY	RCH	BRI	MAR	DAR	HCY	SBO	CRW	RCH; 23	LGY	DOV	HCY	CLT	ASH	HCY; 20	SBO	CAR	CRW	SBO	HCY	LGY	IRP	BRI; 22	HCY	RCH	MAR; 15	CLT	HCY	MAR	57th	412	
