= Jody Ridley =

American racing driver (born 1942)

- Born: May 19, 1942 (age 84); Chatsworth, Georgia, U.S.
- Achievements: 1991, 1992, 1993 Slim Jim All Pro Series Champion; 1987, 1988, 1990 All Pro Super Series Champion; 1985 Snowball Derby Winner; 1993 Myrtle Beach 400 Winner
- Awards: 1980 NASCAR Winston Cup Series Rookie of the Year; 1991, 1992, 1993 Slim Jim All Pro Series Most Popular Driver; Georgia Racing Hall of Fame Inductee (2007)

NASCAR Cup Series career
- 140 races run over 11 years
- Best finish: 5th (1981)
- First race: 1973 Dixie 500 (Atlanta)
- Last race: 1989 Daytona 500 (Daytona)
- First win: 1981 Mason-Dixon 500 (Dover)
Wins	Top tens	Poles
1	56	0

NASCAR O'Reilly Auto Parts Series career
- 3 races run over 2 years
- Best finish: 75th (1982)
- First race: 1982 Goody's 300 (Daytona)
- Last race: 1985 Winn-Dixie 300 (Charlotte)
Wins	Top tens	Poles
0	2	0
- Statistics up to date as of March 25, 2013.

Murphy Jody Ridley (born May 19, 1942) is an American former NASCAR driver. He won the 1980 NASCAR Winston Cup Rookie of the Year award and one race at Dover International Speedway the next year, the only Cup victory for Donlavey Racing.

Ridley's career statistics include 140 career starts, one win, seven top-fives, 56 top-tens, and two top-ten points finishes (fifth in 1981, and seventh in 1980).

Ridley now resides in Chatsworth, Georgia. He was inducted in the Georgia Racing Hall of Fame in 2007.

== Early life ==
Born in Chatsworth, Georgia, and raised in Dalton, Ridley was a fan of cars from a young age. In 1967, he purchased Joe Lee Johnson's 1963 Ford Mustang at the age of 25. At that time, he had only been racing and affiliated with NASCAR for a year, joining the professional leagues in 1966. 1967 would be the beginning of Ridley's career, participating in many NASCAR races throughout Georgia, such as in Lakewood, Trenton, and Byron.

== Motorsports career results ==
=== NASCAR ===
(key) (Bold – Pole position awarded by qualifying time. Italics – Pole position earned by points standings or practice time. * – Most laps led.)

==== Winston Cup Series ====
NASCAR Winston Cup Series results
Year	Team	No.	Make	1	2	3	4	5	6	7	8	9	10	11	12	13	14	15	16	17	18	19	20	21	22	23	24	25	26	27	28	29	30	31	NWCC	Pts	Ref
1973	Donlavey Racing	90	Mercury	RSD	DAY	RCH	CAR	BRI	ATL	NWS	DAR	MAR	TAL	NSV	CLT	DOV	TWS	RSD	MCH	DAY	BRI	ATL; 5	TAL; 37	NSV	DAR	RCH	DOV	NWS	MAR	CLT					59th	-	
1973	Elliott Racing	09	Ford																												CAR; 31				59th	-	
1974	Donlavey Racing	90	Ford	RSD	DAY	RCH	CAR	BRI	ATL; 33	DAR	NWS	MAR	TAL	NSV	DOV	CLT	RSD	MCH	DAY	BRI	NSV	ATL	POC	TAL	MCH	DAR	RCH	DOV	NWS	MAR	CLT	CAR; 30	ONT		88th	3.17	
1975	Donlavey Racing	93	Ford	RSD	DAY	RCH	CAR	BRI	ATL; 29	NWS	DAR	MAR	TAL																			ATL; 11	ONT		NA	0	
1975	Arrington Racing	6	Dodge											NSV; 27	DOV	CLT	RSD	MCH	DAY	NSV	POC	TAL	MCH	DAR	DOV	NWS	MAR	CLT	RCH	CAR	BRI				NA	0	
1977	Makar Enterprises	84	Mercury	RSD	DAY	RCH	CAR	ATL; 14	NWS	DAR	BRI	MAR	TAL	NSV	DOV	CLT	RSD	MCH	DAY	NSV	POC	TAL	MCH	BRI	DAR	RCH	DOV	MAR	NWS	CLT	CAR	ATL	ONT		87th	121	
1979	Donlavey Racing	77	Mercury	RSD	DAY	CAR	RCH	ATL	NWS	BRI	DAR	MAR	TAL	NSV	DOV	CLT	TWS	RSD	MCH	DAY	NSV	POC	TAL; 5	MCH	BRI	DAR	RCH	DOV	MAR	CLT; 26	NWS	CAR	ATL; 10	ONT	47th	374	
1980	Donlavey Racing	90	Ford	RSD; 16		RCH; 18	CAR; 29		BRI; 11	DAR; 10	NWS; 7	MAR; 7		NSV; 8	DOV; 6		TWS; 26	RSD; 11	MCH; 6		NSV; 8	POC; 18				DAR; 30	RCH; 5	DOV; 9	NWS; 9	MAR; 9		CAR; 5	ATL; 6	ONT; 18	7th	3972	
1980	Donlavey Racing	90	Mercury		DAY; 10			ATL; 6					TAL; 10			CLT; 12				DAY; 7			TAL; 30	MCH; 18	BRI; 12						CLT; 8				7th	3972	
1981	Donlavey Racing	90	Ford	RSD; 7	DAY; 7	RCH; 8		ATL; 6	BRI; 6	NWS; 28	DAR; 7	MAR; 6	TAL; 31	NSV; 25	DOV; 1	CLT; 20	TWS; 6	RSD; 7	MCH; 4	DAY; 38	NSV; 10	POC; 15	TAL; 8	MCH; 12	BRI; 20	DAR; 12	RCH; 9	DOV; 11	MAR; 21	NWS; 7	CLT; 15	CAR; 10	ATL; 5	RSD; 9	5th	4002	
1981	Miller Racing	79	Olds				CAR; 17																												5th	4002	
1982	Donlavey Racing	90	Ford	DAY; 9	RCH; 13	BRI; 20	ATL; 17	CAR; 33	DAR; 22	NWS; 17	MAR; 12	TAL; 38	NSV; 13	DOV; 17	CLT; 6	POC; 9	RSD; 7	MCH; 27	DAY; 15	NSV; 8	POC; 36	TAL; 14	MCH; 26	BRI; 8	DAR; 28	RCH; 25	DOV; 25	NWS; 9	CLT; 7	MAR; 7	CAR; 31	ATL; 28	RSD; 9		13th	3333	
1983	Robert McEntyre Racing	84	Buick	DAY; 10	RCH	CAR	ATL; 17	DAR; 27	NWS	MAR	TAL; 32	NSV	DOV	BRI	CLT; DNQ	RSD	POC	MCH	DAY; 8	NSV	POC														32nd	1050	
1983	Robert McEntyre Racing	84	Chevy																			TAL; 31	MCH; 15	BRI	DAR; 33	RCH	DOV	MAR	NWS	CLT; 12	CAR	ATL; 10	RSD		32nd	1050	
1984	Robert McEntyre Racing	84	Chevy	DAY; 10	RCH	CAR	ATL; 27	BRI	NWS	DAR; 36	MAR	TAL; 16	NSV	DOV	CLT; 8	RSD	POC	MCH; 35	DAY; 19	NSV; 28	POC	TAL; 34	MCH; 14	BRI	DAR; 16	RCH	DOV; 29	MAR	CLT; 7	NWS	CAR	ATL; 32	RSD		14th	1288	
1985	Helen Rae Motorsports	00	Chevy	DAY; DNQ	RCH	CAR	ATL	BRI	DAR	NWS	MAR	TAL	DOV	CLT	RSD	POC	MCH	DAY	POC	TAL	MCH	BRI	DAR	RCH	DOV	MAR	NWS	CLT	CAR	ATL	RSD				NA	-	
1986	RahMoc Enterprises	57	Ford	DAY; 12	RCH	CAR	ATL; 29																												33rd	1213	
1986	RahMoc Enterprises	75	Pontiac					BRI; 23	DAR; 20	NWS; 15	MAR; 10	TAL; 42	DOV; 18	CLT; 21	RSD	POC; 11	MCH; 34	DAY; 13	POC	TAL	GLN	MCH	BRI	DAR	RCH	DOV	MAR	NWS	CLT	CAR	ATL	RSD			33rd	1213	
1989	Melling Racing	9	Ford	DAY; RL^{†}	CAR	ATL	RCH	DAR	BRI	NWS	MAR	TAL	CLT	DOV	SON	POC	MCH	DAY	POC	TAL	GLN	MCH	BRI	DAR	RCH	DOV	MAR	CLT	NWS	CAR	PHO	ATL			NA	NA	
^{†} – Relieved Bill Elliott during race

===== Daytona 500 =====
Year	Team	Manufacturer	Start	Finish
1980	Donlavey Racing	Mercury	27	10
1981	Donlavey Racing	Ford	27	7
1982	Donlavey Racing	Ford	23	9
1983	Robert McEntyre Racing	Buick	18	10
1984	Robert McEntyre Racing	Chevrolet	33	10
1985	Helen Rae Motorsports	Chevrolet	DNQ	
1986	RahMoc Enterprises	Ford	33	12
1989	Melling Racing	Ford	RL^{†}	

==== Busch Series ====
NASCAR Busch Series results
Year	Team	No.	Make	1	2	3	4	5	6	7	8	9	10	11	12	13	14	15	16	17	18	19	20	21	22	23	24	25	26	27	28	29	NBSC	Pts	Ref
1982		98	Pontiac	DAY; 2	RCH	BRI	MAR	DAR; 2	HCY	SBO	CRW	RCH	LGY	DOV	HCY	CLT	ASH	HCY	SBO	CAR	CRW	SBO	HCY	LGY	IRP	BRI	HCY	RCH	MAR	CLT	HCY	MAR	75th	340	
1985	Dale Earnhardt, Inc.	8	Pontiac	DAY	CAR	HCY	BRI	MAR	DAR	SBO	LGY	DOV	CLT; 29	SBO	HCY	ROU	IRP	SBO	LGY	HCY	MLW	BRI	DAR	RCH	NWS	ROU	CLT	HCY	CAR	MAR			86th	76	

Achievements
Preceded by Butch Lindley	Snowball Derby Winner; 1985	Succeeded by Gary Balough
Awards
Preceded by Dale Earnhardt	NASCAR Winston Cup Series Rookie of the Year; 1980	Succeeded by Ron Bouchard
