= Laurent Rioux =

Canadian racing driver (born 1943)

- Born: January 1, 1943 (age 83); Montreal, Quebec, Canada

NASCAR Cup Series career
- 3 races run over 2 years
- Best finish: 1983 Budweiser 500 (Dover Downs)
- First race: 1984 Warner W. Hodgdon Carolina 500 (Rockingham)
| Wins | Top tens | Poles |
|---|---|---|
| 0 | 0 | 0 |

Laurent Rioux (born January 1, 1943) is a Canadian former racing driver from Montreal, Quebec who made three NASCAR Winston Cup Series starts in 1983 and 1984. His best finish in a points race was seventeenth in the 1983 Goody's 500 at Martinsville Speedway. He failed to qualify for the Daytona 500 both times he attempted it (in 1983 and 1984), but finished second in the consolation race in 1984.

Rioux also made fifteen Busch North Series starts from 1979 to 1981.

== Motorsports career results ==
=== NASCAR ===
(key) (Bold – Pole position awarded by qualifying time. Italics – Pole position earned by points standings or practice time. * – Most laps led.)

==== Winston Cup Series ====
NASCAR Winston Cup Series results
| Year | Team | No. | Make | 1 | 2 | 3 | 4 | 5 | 6 | 7 | 8 | 9 | 10 | 11 | 12 | 13 | 14 | 15 | 16 | 17 | 18 | 19 | 20 | 21 | 22 | 23 | 24 | 25 | 26 | 27 | 28 | 29 | 30 | NWCC | Pts | Ref |
|---|---|---|---|---|---|---|---|---|---|---|---|---|---|---|---|---|---|---|---|---|---|---|---|---|---|---|---|---|---|---|---|---|---|---|---|---|
| 1983 | Rioux Racing | 38 | Chevy | DAY; DNQ | RCH | CAR | ATL | DAR | NWS | MAR | TAL | NSV | DOV | BRI | CLT | RSD | POC | MCH | DAY | NSV | POC | TAL | MCH | BRI | DAR | RCH | DOV; 19 | MAR; 17 | NWS | CLT; DNQ | CAR | ATL | RSD | NA | – | |
| 1984 | Rioux Racing | 68 | Chevy | DAY; DNQ | RCH | CAR; 20 | ATL | BRI | NWS | DAR | MAR | TAL | NSV | DOV | CLT | RSD | POC | MCH | DAY | NSV | POC | TAL | MCH | BRI | DAR | RCH | DOV | MAR | CLT | NWS | CAR | ATL | RSD | NA | – | |

===== Daytona 500 =====
| Year | Team | Manufacturer | Start | Finish |
|---|---|---|---|---|
| 1983 | Rioux Racing | Chevrolet | DNQ | |
| 1984 | Rioux Racing | Chevrolet | DNQ | |
