= Tommy Gale (racing driver) =

Racecar driver from Pennsylvania

- Born: September 10, 1934; McKeesport, Pennsylvania, U.S.
- Died: September 30, 1999 (aged 65)

NASCAR Cup Series career
- 246 races run over 17 years
- Best finish: 15th – 1981
- First race: 1968 American 500 (Rockingham)
- Last race: 1986 Winston 500 (Talladega)
Wins	Top tens	Poles
0	4	0

Tommy Gale (September 10, 1934 – September 30, 1999) was an American NASCAR Winston Cup Series race car driver from McKeesport, Pennsylvania who raced from 1968 to 1986. He ended up becoming one of the runners-up for the 1977 NASCAR Rookie of the Year award.

== Career ==
Gale started as a NASCAR Cup Series rookie when he was 34 years old and competed until his retirement at the age of 51. Leading only three laps of his 60,655-lap spanning career, Gale managed to make $683,965 in total winnings ($2,008,913.59 when adjusted for inflation). While starting in 27th place on average, his average finishes were 22nd place after competing in a grueling 75,239.7 miles or 121,086.6 kilometres of top-level professional stock car racing.

Gale's only three DNQs came at the 1972 Miller High Life 500, the 1973 Daytona 500 and at the 1984 Talladega 500.

Gale's strongest performances are on short oval tracks where he finished an average of twentieth place. His weakness would be found on road courses; where a finish of 28th place would be expected out of Gale. His primary vehicle throughout his career was the No. 64 Ford machine owned by fellow NASCAR driver Elmo Langley.

== Post-NASCAR career ==
After Gale retired from NASCAR, he decided to focus on his son and started a trucking business in Elizabeth, Pennsylvania; which is near his hometown of McKeesport.

== Motorsports results ==
=== NASCAR ===
(key) (Bold – Pole position awarded by qualifying time. Italics – Pole position earned by points standings or practice time. * – Most laps led.)

==== Grand National Series ====
NASCAR Grand National Series results
Year	Team	No.	Make	1	2	3	4	5	6	7	8	9	10	11	12	13	14	15	16	17	18	19	20	21	22	23	24	25	26	27	28	29	30	31	32	33	34	35	36	37	38	39	40	41	42	43	44	45	46	47	48	49	50	51	52	53	54	NGNC	Pts	Ref
1968	Lyle Stelter	56	Mercury	MGR	MGY	RSD	DAY	BRI	RCH	ATL	HCY	GPS	CLB	NWS	MAR	AUG	AWS	DAR	BLV	LGY	CLT	ASH	MGR	SMR	BIR	CAR	GPS	DAY	ISP	OXF	FDA	TRN	BRI	SMR	NSV	ATL	CLB	BGS	AWS	SBO	LGY	DAR	HCY	RCH	BLV	HBO	MAR	NWS	AUG	CLT	CAR; 30	JFC						N/A	0	
1969	Don Culpepper	76	Ford	MGR	MGY	RSD	DAY	DAY; 12	DAY	CAR	AUG	BRI	ATL	CLB	HCY	GPS	RCH	NWS	MAR	AWS	DAR	BLV	LGY	CLT	MGR	SMR	MCH	KPT	GPS	NCF	DAY	DOV	TPN	TRN	BLV	BRI	NSV	SMR	ATL	MCH	SBO	BGS	AWS	DAR	HCY	RCH	TAL	CLB	MAR	NWS	CLT	SVH	AUG	CAR	JFC	MGR	TWS	90th	39	
1970	Walt Valerio	03	Ford	RSD	DAY; 15	DAY																																																				52nd	271	
1970	Walt Valerio	03	Mercury				DAY; 31	RCH	CAR	SVH	ATL	BRI	TAL	NWS	CLB	DAR	BLV	LGY	CLT	SMR	MAR	MCH; 36	RSD	HCY	KPT	GPS	DAY	AST	TPN	TRN; 10	BRI	SMR	NSV	ATL	CLB	ONA	MCH	TAL	BGS	SBO	DAR	HCY	RCH	DOV; 27	NCF	NWS	CLT	MAR	MGR	CAR	LGY							52nd	271	
1971	Larry Jackson	03	Mercury	RSD	DAY	DAY; 9	DAY; 21	ONT	RCH	CAR	HCY	BRI	ATL; 22	CLB	GPS	SMR	NWS	MAR	DAR	SBO	TAL; 37	ASH	KPT	CLT	DOV	MCH; 18	RSD	HOU	GPS	DAY	BRI	AST	ISP	TRN; 24	NSV	ATL	BGS	ONA		TAL; 14	CLB	HCY	DAR	MAR	CLT	DOV; 23	CAR	MGR	RCH	NWS	TWS							41st	729	
1971	Richard Giachetti	44	Ford																																				MCH; 11																			41st	729	

==== Winston Cup Series ====
NASCAR Winston Cup Series results
Year	Team	No.	Make	1	2	3	4	5	6	7	8	9	10	11	12	13	14	15	16	17	18	19	20	21	22	23	24	25	26	27	28	29	30	31	NWCC	Pts	Ref
1972	Frank Vasko	03	Mercury	RSD	DAY; 11	RCH	ONT; DNQ	CAR	ATL; 27	BRI	DAR	NWS	MAR	TAL	CLT	DOV								TAL; 28	MCH	NSV	DAR; 16	RCH	DOV	MAR	NWS	CLT; 23	CAR; 39	TWS	41st	1298	
1972	Richard Giachetti	44	Ford														MCH; DNQ	RSD	TWS	DAY	BRI	TRN	ATL												41st	1298	
1973	Frank Vasko	03	Mercury	RSD	DAY; DNQ	RCH	CAR	BRI	ATL	NWS	DAR	MAR																							57th	N/A	
1973	Gale Racing	03	Mercury										TAL; 13	NSV	CLT	DOV	TWS	RSD				ATL; 37	TAL; 48	NSV	DAR; 36	RCH	DOV	NWS	MAR	CLT	CAR				57th	N/A	
1973	Gale Racing	03	Chevy																MCH; 25	DAY	BRI														57th	N/A	
1975	Langley Racing	64	Ford	RSD	DAY; 23	RCH	CAR	BRI	ATL	NWS	DAR	MAR	TAL	NSV	DOV	CLT	RSD	MCH																	46th	437	
1975	Champion Racing	10	Ford																DAY; 18	NSV	POC; 28	TAL	MCH	DAR; 22	DOV; 35	NWS	MAR	CLT	RCH	CAR	BRI	ATL	ONT		46th	437	
1976	Langley Racing	64	Ford	RSD	DAY; DNQ	CAR; 15	RCH	BRI	ATL; 35	NWS	DAR; 22	MAR	TAL; 18	NSV	DOV; 37	CLT	RSD	MCH; 21			POC; 34	TAL; 40	MCH	BRI	DAR	RCH	DOV; 25	MAR	NWS	CLT	CAR; 24	ATL	ONT; 17		33rd	1005	
1976	Henley Gray	19	Chevy																DAY; 29	NSV															33rd	1005	
1977	Langley Racing	64	Ford	RSD	DAY; DNQ	RCH	CAR; 21	ATL; 22	NWS	DAR; 21	BRI	MAR; 23	TAL; 15	NSV	DOV; 18	CLT; 37	RSD	MCH; 23	DAY; 38	NSV	POC; 25	TAL; 14	MCH; 32	BRI	DAR; 18	RCH; 24	DOV; 26	MAR	NWS	CLT; 21	CAR; 15	ATL	ONT; 22		26th	1689	
1978	Langley Racing	64	Ford	RSD	DAY; 25	RCH; 23	CAR; 14	ATL; 22	BRI; 22	DAR; 21	NWS; 27	MAR; 17	TAL; 16	DOV; 18	CLT; 24	NSV	RSD	MCH; 21	DAY; 15	NSV	POC; 16	TAL; 20	MCH; 16	BRI; 21	DAR; 13	RCH; 24	DOV; 17	MAR; 27	NWS; 17	CLT; 31	CAR; 18	ATL; DNQ	ONT; 17		20th	2639	
1978	Bobby Wawak	74	Chevy																													ATL; 31			20th	2639	
1979	Langley Racing	64	Ford	RSD	DAY; DNQ	CAR; 13	RCH; 22	ATL; 21	NWS; 20	BRI; 18	DAR; 34	MAR; 16	TAL; 7	NSV; 13	DOV; 19	CLT; 20	TWS; 20	RSD	MCH; 33	DAY; 27	NSV; 28	POC; 19	TAL; 36	MCH; 14	BRI; 15	DAR; 21	RCH; 24	DOV; 15	MAR; 22	CLT; 21	NWS; 27	CAR; 12	ATL; 22	ONT; 34	18th	2795	
1980	Langley Racing	64	Ford	RSD	DAY; 20	RCH; 21	CAR; 26	ATL; 18	BRI; 17	DAR; 15	NWS; 29	MAR; 29	TAL; 16	NSV; 15	DOV; 12	CLT; 33	TWS; 25	RSD		DAY; 28	NSV; 18	POC; 19	TAL; 29	MCH; 22	BRI; 13	DAR; 31	RCH; 19	DOV; 36	NWS; 20	MAR; 11	CLT; 22	CAR; 20	ATL; 15	ONT; 16	18th	2885	
1980	Ulrich Racing	40	Chevy																MCH; 19																18th	2885	
1981	Langley Racing	64	Ford	RSD	DAY; 17		CAR; 19	ATL; 18	BRI; 15	NWS; 19	DAR; 18		TAL; 11	NSV; 17		CLT; 17	TWS; 12		MCH; 36	DAY; 19	NSV; 21	POC; 31	TAL; 18	MCH; 21	BRI; 15	DAR; 29	RCH; 17	DOV; 24	MAR; 13	NWS; 14	CLT; 22	CAR; 13	ATL; 22	RSD; 26	15th	3140	
1981	Junior Miller	79	Olds			RCH; 18																													15th	3140	
1981	Ulrich Racing	40	Buick									MAR; 18			DOV; 14			RSD; 30																	15th	3140	
1982	Langley Racing	64	Ford	DAY; 16	RCH; 21	BRI; 17	ATL; 37	CAR; 12	DAR; 11	NWS; DNQ	MAR	TAL; 16	NSV; 16	DOV; 13	CLT; DNQ	POC; 18	RSD; Wth	MCH; 18	DAY; 14	NSV; 18	POC; 23	TAL; 29	MCH; 20	BRI; 19	DAR; 25	RCH; 21	DOV; 14	NWS; 19	CLT; 36	MAR; 17	CAR; 16	ATL; 26	RSD		21st	2698	
1982	Hylton Racing	48	Buick												CLT; 23																				21st	2698	
1983	Langley Racing	64	Ford	DAY; 27	RCH; DNQ	CAR; 21	ATL; 23	DAR; 14	NWS; 19	MAR; 22	TAL; 13	NSV; 28	DOV; 27	BRI; 20	CLT; 35	RSD	POC; 25	MCH; 26	DAY; 23	NSV; 28	POC; 24	TAL; 39	MCH; 28	BRI; 23	DAR; 29	RCH; 30		MAR; 19	NWS; 24	CLT; 31	CAR; 10	ATL; 19	RSD		23rd	2507	
1983	Bud Reeder	02	Pontiac		RCH; 32																						DOV; 28								23rd	2507	
1984	Langley Racing	64	Ford	DAY; 32	RCH	CAR; 30	ATL; 24	BRI; 20	NWS; 23	DAR; 18	MAR	TAL; 19	NSV; 27	DOV; 23	CLT; 25	RSD	POC; 27	MCH; 33	DAY; 24	NSV	POC; 36	TAL; DNQ	MCH	BRI; 11	DAR; 22	RCH	DOV	MAR	CLT	NWS	CAR	ATL	RSD		33rd	1426	
1986	Langley Racing	64	Ford	DAY	RCH	CAR	ATL	BRI	DAR	NWS	MAR	TAL; 25	DOV	CLT	RSD	POC	MCH	DAY	POC	TAL	GLN	MCH	BRI	DAR	RCH	DOV	MAR	NWS	CLT	CAR	ATL	RSD			N/A	0	

===== Daytona 500 =====
Year	Team	Manufacturer	Start	Finish
1970	Walt Valerio	Mercury	29	31
1971	Larry Jackson	Mercury	20	21
1972	Frank Vasco	Mercury	26	11
1973	Frank Vasco	Mercury	DNQ	
1975	Langley Racing	Ford	24	23
1976	Langley Racing	Ford	DNQ	
1977	Langley Racing	Ford	DNQ	
1978	Langley Racing	Ford	38	25
1979	Langley Racing	Ford	DNQ	
1980	Langley Racing	Ford	29	20
1981	Langley Racing	Ford	28	17
1982	Langley Racing	Ford	42	16
1983	Langley Racing	Ford	25	27
1984	Langley Racing	Ford	30	32
