= Nashville 200 =

There have been three NASCAR races named Nashville 200:

- Nashville 200 (Grand National), a Grand National Division race held at Nashville Speedway in 1958
- Nashville 200 (Busch), a Busch Series race held at Nashville Fairgrounds Speedway in April 1984
- Nashville 200 (spring), a Camping World Truck Series race held at Nashville Superspeedway in April 2010
- Nashville 200 (fall), a Camping World Truck Series race held at Nashville Superspeedway in August 2010
