= 1983 NASCAR Winston Cup Series =

American motorsport season

Seasons
- ← 1982 1984 →

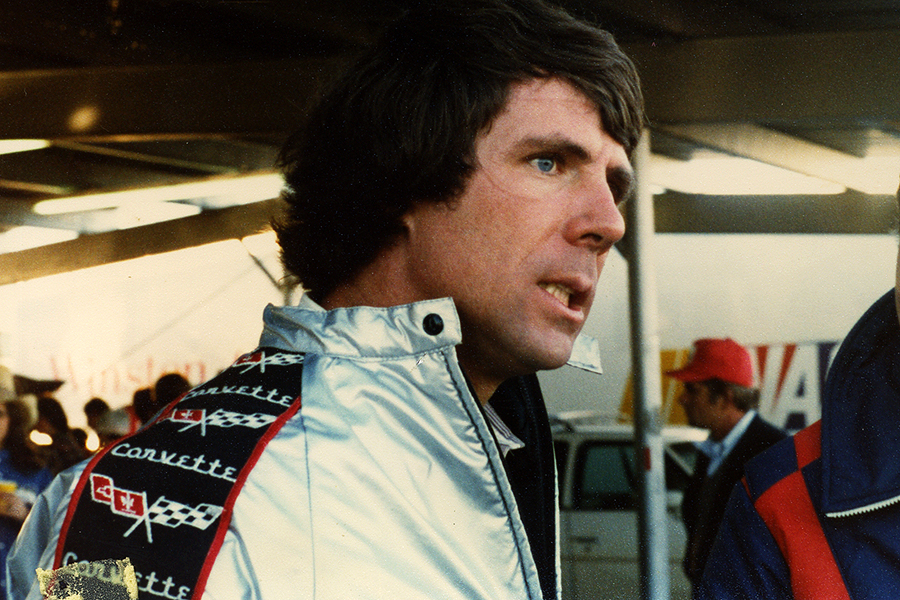
Darrell Waltrip, finished second in points.

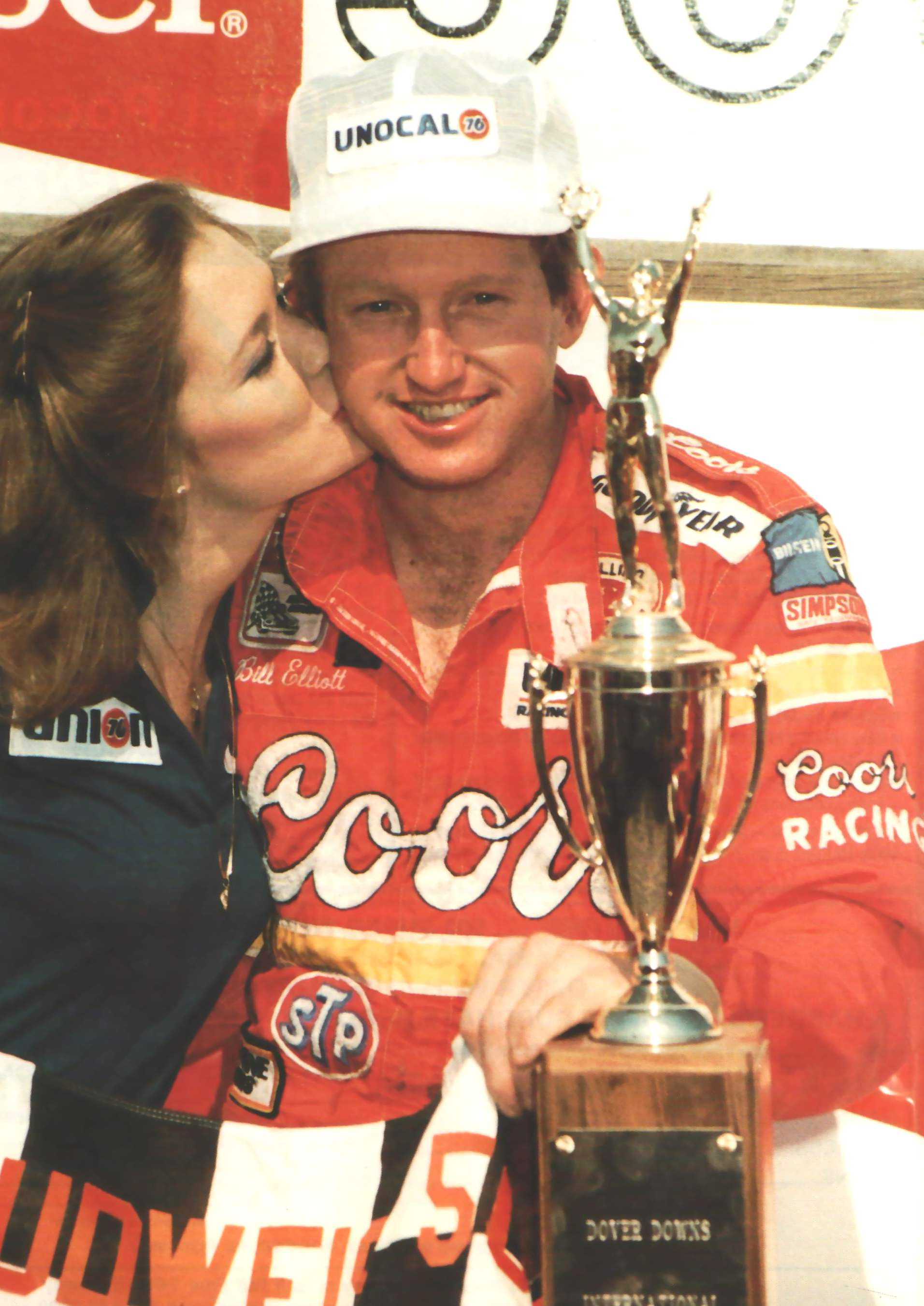
Bill Elliott, future champion, finished third in the standings.

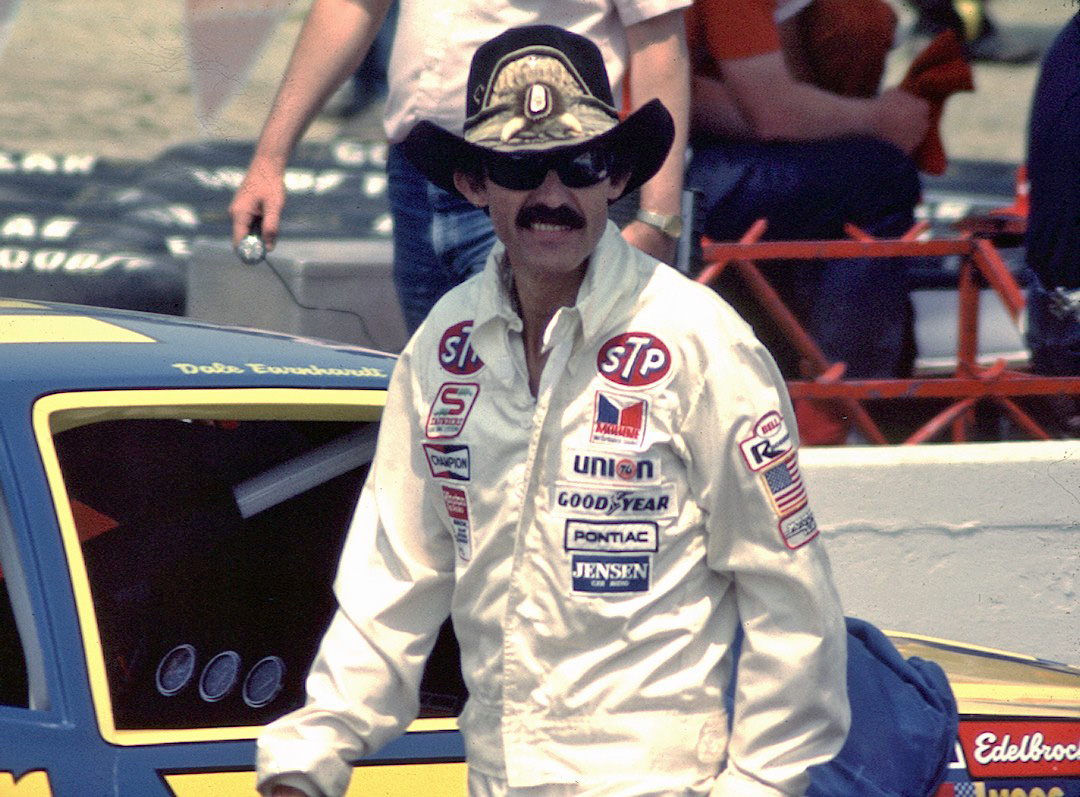
Richard Petty, the seven time champion finished fourth in the standings.

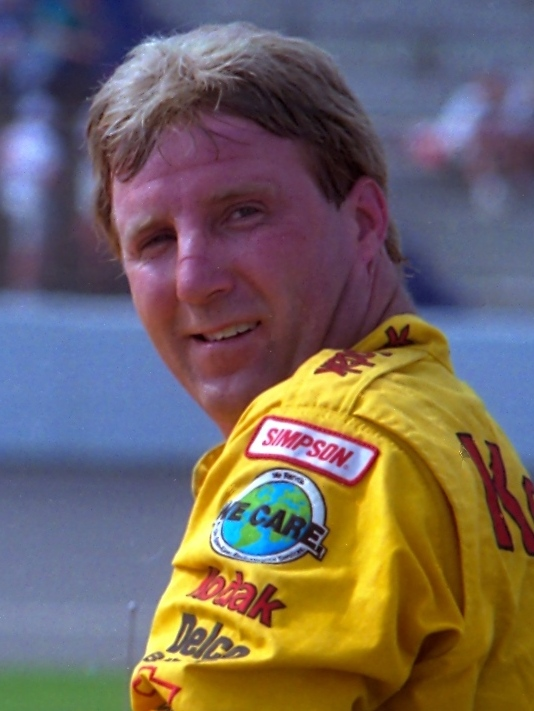
Sterling Marlin, the 1983 NASCAR Winston Cup Rookie of the Year.

The 1983 NASCAR Winston Cup Series was the 35th season of professional stock car racing in the United States and the 12th modern-era Cup series season. The season began on Sunday, February 20 and ended on Sunday, November 20. Bobby Allison was crowned Winston Cup champion at the end of the season finishing 47 points ahead of Darrell Waltrip.

== Teams and drivers ==
Team	Make	No.	Driver	Car Owner	Crew Chief
Arrington Racing	Chrysler Imperial; Dodge Mirada	67	Buddy Arrington	Buddy Arrington	
Benfield Racing	Buick Regal	98	Joe Ruttman	Ron Benfield	Buddy Parrott
Blue Max Racing	Pontiac Grand Prix; Pontiac LeMans	27	Tim Richmond	Raymond Beadle	Tim Brewer
Bobby Hawkins Racing	Chevrolet Monte Carlo	16	David Pearson	Bobby Hawkins	
Bud Moore Engineering	Ford Thunderbird	15	Dale Earnhardt	Bud Moore	Bud Moore
Cliff Stewart Racing	Pontiac Grand Prix	88	Geoff Bodine	Cliff Stewart	
DiGard Motorsports	Chevrolet Monte Carlo; Buick Regal	22	Bobby Allison	Bill Gardner	Gary Nelson
Donlavey Racing	Ford Thunderbird	90	Dick Brooks	Junie Donlavey	
Ellington Racing	Chevrolet Monte Carlo	1	Lake Speed	Hoss Ellington	Runt Pittman
Hagan Racing	Chevrolet Monte Carlo	44	Terry Labonte	Billy Hagan	Dale Inman
Hamby Motorsports	Pontiac Grand Prix	17	Sterling Marlin (R)	Roger Hamby	
Henderson Motorsports	Chevrolet Monte Carlo; Buick Regal	26	Ronnie Hopkins (R)	Charlie Henderson	
Hillin Racing	Buick Regal	8	Bobby Hillin Jr. (R)	Bobby Hillin Sr.	Harry Hyde
Hylton Racing	Chevrolet Monte Carlo	48	Trevor Boys (R)/James Hylton	James Hylton	
Jim Stacy Racing	Buick Regal	2	Morgan Shepherd	Jim Stacy	
Johnny Hayes Racing	Buick Regal; Chevrolet Monte Carlo	55	Benny Parsons	Johnny Hayes	Cliff Champion
Junior Johnson & Associates	Chevrolet Monte Carlo	11	Darrell Waltrip	Junior Johnson	Jeff Hammond
Langley Racing	Ford Thunderbird	64	Tommy Gale	Elmo Langley	
Mach 1 Racing	Buick Regal	33	Harry Gant	Hal Needham	Travis Carter
Marcis Auto Racing	Chevrolet Monte Carlo	71	Dave Marcis	Dave Marcis	
McDuffie Racing	Pontiac Grand Prix	70	J. D. McDuffie	J. D. McDuffie	
Means Racing	Chevrolet Monte Carlo	52	Jimmy Means	Jimmy Means	
Melling Racing	Ford Thunderbird	9	Bill Elliott	Harry Melling	Ernie Elliott
Morgan-McClure Motorsports	Chevrolet Monte Carlo	4	Mark Martin	Larry McClure	
Petty Enterprises	Pontiac Grand Prix	7	Kyle Petty	Richard Petty	Maurice Petty
Petty Enterprises	Pontiac Grand Prix	43	Richard Petty	Richard Petty	Robin Pemberton
Race Hill Farm Team	Buick Regal	47	Ron Bouchard	Jack Beebe	David Ifft
RahMoc Enterprises	Chevrolet Monte Carlo	75	Neil Bonnett	Bob Rahilly	Bob Rahilly
Ranier-Lundy Racing	Chevrolet Monte Carlo	28	Cale Yarborough	Harry Ranier	Waddell Wilson
Richard Childress Racing	Chevrolet Monte Carlo	3	Ricky Rudd	Richard Childress	Kirk Shelmerdine
Robert McEntyre Racing	Buick Regal; Chevrolet Monte Carlo	84	Jody Ridley	Robert McEntyre	
Thomas Racing	Pontiac Grand Prix	41	Ronnie Thomas	Ronnie Thomas	
Ulrich Racing	Buick Regal	6	D. K. Ulrich	D. K. Ulrich	
Wood Brothers Racing	Ford Thunderbird	21	Buddy Baker	Glen Wood	Leonard Wood

== Schedule ==
No.	Race title	Track	Date
	Busch Clash	Daytona International Speedway, Daytona Beach	February 13–14*
	UNO Twin 125 Qualifiers	Daytona International Speedway, Daytona Beach	February 17
	Daytona 500 Consolation Race	Daytona International Speedway, Daytona Beach	February 18
1	Daytona 500	Daytona International Speedway, Daytona Beach	February 20
2	Richmond 400	Richmond Fairgrounds Raceway, Richmond	February 27
3	Hodgdon Carolina 500	North Carolina Motor Speedway, Rockingham	March 6 & 13
4	Coca-Cola 500	Atlanta International Raceway, Hampton	March 27
5	TranSouth 500	Darlington Raceway, Darlington	April 10
6	Northwestern Bank 400	North Wilkesboro Speedway, North Wilkesboro	April 17
7	Virginia National Bank 500	Martinsville Speedway, Ridgeway	April 24
8	Winston 500	Alabama International Motor Speedway, Talladega	May 1
9	Marty Robbins 420	Nashville Speedway, Nashville	May 8
10	Mason-Dixon 500	Dover Downs International Speedway, Dover	May 15
11	Valleydale 500	Bristol International Raceway, Bristol	May 22
12	World 600	Charlotte Motor Speedway, Concord	May 29
13	Budweiser 400	Riverside International Raceway, Riverside	June 5
14	Van Scoy Diamond Mine 500	Pocono International Raceway, Long Pond	June 12
15	Gabriel 400	Michigan International Speedway, Brooklyn	June 19
16	Firecracker 400	Daytona International Speedway, Daytona Beach	July 4
17	Busch Nashville 420	Nashville Speedway, Nashville	July 16
18	Like Cola 500	Pocono International Raceway, Long Pond	July 24
19	Talladega 500	Alabama International Motor Speedway, Talladega	July 31
20	Champion Spark Plug 400	Michigan International Speedway, Brooklyn	August 21
21	Busch 500	Bristol International Raceway, Bristol	August 27
22	Southern 500	Darlington Raceway, Darlington	September 5
23	Wrangler Sanfor-Set 400	Richmond Fairgrounds Raceway, Richmond	September 11
24	Budweiser 500	Dover Downs International Speedway, Dover	September 18
25	Goody's 500	Martinsville Speedway, Ridgeway	September 25
26	Holly Farms 400	North Wilkesboro Speedway, North Wilkesboro	October 2
27	Miller High Life 500	Charlotte Motor Speedway, Concord	October 9
28	Warner W. Hodgdon American 500	North Carolina Motor Speedway, Rockingham	October 30
29	Atlanta Journal 500	Atlanta International Raceway, Hampton	November 6
30	Winston Western 500	Riverside International Raceway, Riverside	November 20

- The Busch Clash was scheduled for Sunday, February 13 but rain forced the race to be postponed until Monday, February 14.

== Season Results ==
=== Races ===
Rd.	Race Name	Pole position	Most laps led	Winning driver	Winning manufacturer	Report
NC	Busch Clash	Bill Elliott	Darrell Waltrip	Neil Bonnett	Chevrolet Monte Carlo	Report
NC	First UNO Twin 125 Qualifier	Ricky Rudd		Dale Earnhardt	Ford Thunderbird	Report
NC	Second UNO Twin 125 Qualifier	Geoff Bodine		Neil Bonnett	Chevrolet Monte Carlo	Report
NC	Daytona 500 Consolation Race	Darryl Sage	Blackie Wangerin	Blackie Wangerin	Ford Thunderbird	Report
1	**Daytona 500**	Ricky Rudd	Joe Ruttman	Cale Yarborough	Pontiac LeMans	Report
2	Richmond 400	Ricky Rudd	Joe Ruttman	Bobby Allison	Chevrolet Monte Carlo	Report
3	Warner W. Hodgdon Carolina 500	Ricky Rudd	Cale Yarborough	Richard Petty	Pontiac Grand Prix	Report
4	Coca-Cola 500	Geoff Bodine	Neil Bonnett	Cale Yarborough	Chevrolet Monte Carlo	Report
5	TranSouth 500	Tim Richmond	Geoff Bodine	Harry Gant	Buick Regal	Report
6	Northwestern Bank 400	Neil Bonnett	Darrell Waltrip	Darrell Waltrip	Chevrolet Monte Carlo	Report
7	Virginia National Bank 500	Ricky Rudd	Darrell Waltrip	Darrell Waltrip	Chevrolet Monte Carlo	Report
8	**Winston 500**	Cale Yarborough	Richard Petty	Richard Petty	Pontiac Grand Prix	Report
9	Marty Robbins 420	Darrell Waltrip	Darrell Waltrip	Darrell Waltrip	Chevrolet Monte Carlo	Report
10	Mason-Dixon 500	Joe Ruttman	Bobby Allison	Bobby Allison	Buick Regal	Report
11	Valleydale 500	Neil Bonnett	Darrell Waltrip	Darrell Waltrip	Chevrolet Monte Carlo	Report
12	**World 600**	Buddy Baker	Bobby Allison	Neil Bonnett	Chevrolet Monte Carlo	Report
13	Budweiser 400	Darrell Waltrip	Ricky Rudd	Ricky Rudd	Chevrolet Monte Carlo	Report
14	Van Scoy Diamond Mine 500	Darrell Waltrip	Bobby Allison	Bobby Allison	Buick Regal	Report
15	Gabriel 400	Terry Labonte	Terry Labonte	Cale Yarborough	Chevrolet Monte Carlo	Report
16	Firecracker 400	Cale Yarborough	Buddy Baker	Buddy Baker	Ford Thunderbird	Report
17	Busch Nashville 420	Ron Bouchard	Dale Earnhardt	Dale Earnhardt	Ford Thunderbird	Report
18	Like Cola 500	Tim Richmond	Bobby Allison	Tim Richmond	Pontiac LeMans	Report
19	Talladega 500	Cale Yarborough	Dale Earnhardt; Tim Richmond	Dale Earnhardt	Ford Thunderbird	Report
20	Champion Spark Plug 400	Terry Labonte	Cale Yarborough	Cale Yarborough	Ford Thunderbird	Report
21	Busch 500	Joe Ruttman	Darrell Waltrip	Darrell Waltrip	Chevrolet Monte Carlo	Report
22	**Southern 500**	Neil Bonnett	Bobby Allison	Bobby Allison	Buick Regal	Report
23	Wrangler Sanfor-Set 400	Darrell Waltrip	Bobby Allison	Bobby Allison	Buick Regal	Report
24	Budweiser 500	Terry Labonte	Bobby Allison	Bobby Allison	Buick Regal	Report
25	Goody's 500	Darrell Waltrip	Ricky Rudd	Ricky Rudd	Chevrolet Monte Carlo	Report
26	Holly Farms 400	Darrell Waltrip	Darrell Waltrip	Darrell Waltrip	Chevrolet Monte Carlo	Report
27	Miller High Life 500	Tim Richmond	Tim Richmond	Richard Petty	Pontiac Grand Prix	Report
28	Warner W. Hodgdon American 500	Neil Bonnett	Tim Richmond	Terry Labonte	Chevrolet Monte Carlo	Report
29	Atlanta Journal 500	Tim Richmond	Bobby Allison	Neil Bonnett	Chevrolet Monte Carlo	Report
30	Winston Western 500	Darrell Waltrip	Darrell Waltrip	Bill Elliott	Ford Thunderbird	Report

- **Bold** indicates a NASCAR Crown Jewel race.
- The Busch 500 was shortened to 419 of 500 laps due to rain.

== Final Points Standings ==
(key) Bold – Pole position awarded by time. Italics – Pole position set by final practice results or 1982 Owner's points. * – Most laps led.

Pos.	Driver	DAY	RCH	CAR	ATL	DAR	NWS	MAR	TAL	NSV	DOV	BRI	CLT	RIV	POC	MCH	DAY	NSV	POC	TAL	MCH	BRI	DAR	RCH	DOV	MAR	NWS	CLT	CAR	ATL	RIV	Pts
1	Bobby Allison	9	1	10	25	8	2	3	10	2	1*	2	3*	22	1*	2	14	4	3*	9	34	3	1*	1*	1*	2	3	7	16	3*	9	4667
2	Darrell Waltrip	36	29	3	40	2	1*	1*	33	1*	2	1*	4	**7**	**2**	4	20	2	2	2	2	1*	3	**3**	5	**3**	**1***	2	5	9	**6***	4620
3	Bill Elliott	2	6	2	30	5	21	21	5	5	4	8	16	2	6	25	7	7	6	8	3	27	2	4	8	14	4	8	21	6	1	4279
4	Richard Petty	38	8	1	5	25	10	17	1*	6	7	5	2	10	3	11	33	19	10	4	6	9	12	6	9	9	12	1	26	5	10	4042
5	Terry Labonte	6	22	24	8	36	6	6	6	8	31	6	33	31	9	**5**	5	11	12	29	**4**	5	5	5	**4**	24	5	4	1	4	7	4004
6	Neil Bonnett	22	3	12	2	7	**4**	16	15	13	28	**4**	1	13	7	31	28	6	4	35	35	10	4	8	7	6	13	26	**4**	1	3	3842
7	Harry Gant	37	5	5	11	1	3	2	4	3	9	27	25	3	18	8	11	8	5	5	30	6	22	20	17	8	9	29	23	37	31	3790
8	Dale Earnhardt	35	2	33	33	13	29	26	24	24	8	9	5	4	8	15	9	1	35	1*	7	2	11	22	35	4	2	14	17	33	4	3732
9	Ricky Rudd	**24**	**28**	**6**	10	4	27	**5**	8	14	24	26	32	1	31	6	21	5	7	16	27	14	25	2	13	1	6	9	3	26	37	3693
10	Tim Richmond	41	17	7	9	35	28	15	27	10	30	10	40	28	4	3	31	3	**1***	3*	5	22	26	23	3	26	10	**5**	2	**29**	5	3612
11	Dave Marcis	32	9	34	13	33	9	19	9	27	16	12	10	12	11	30	13	9	8	32	11	20	14	18	22	28	25	17	7	13	12	3361
12	Joe Ruttman	4*	7	29	4	20	7	4	11	7	**3**	23	14	34	10	33	37	22	9	15	24	**18**	38	27	20	7	14	13	30	30	41	3342
13	Kyle Petty	33	14	15	35	31	30	11	30	17	11	11	8	6	13	16	30	20	11	11	14	11	35	12	26	12	16	18	24	20	13	3261
14	Dick Brooks	5	13	8	6	19	20	8	14	25	15	21	37	5	28	12	32	14	15	7	21	21	31	13	32	16	15	37	18	31	34	3230
15	Buddy Arrington	16	20	22	16	23	15	9	23	16	19	16	12	17	17	29	34	24	32	18	23	13	18	14	23	10	18	34	12	14	23	3158
16	Ron Bouchard	26	12	20	12	18	11	7	20	9	34	7	41		34	28	4	**27**	13	12	12	7	32	25	16		7	15	6	23	11	3113
17	Geoff Bodine	30	4	19	**41**	9	5	25	21	20	35	25	36	29	30	9	6	16	39	6	36	4	13	21	2	5	11	28	33			3019
18	Jimmy Means	14	16	14	32	12	14	10	7	12	12	14	38	18	20	21	36	12	35			26	20	24	21	15	22	23	9	18	16	2983
19	Sterling Marlin **(R)**	34	18	13	31	11	22	12	41	11	10	18	19	25	29	20	16	15	18	21	29	15	24	26	27	27	17	40	15	16	17	2980
20	Morgan Shepherd	DNQ	31			26		32	17	4	6	3	9	8	15	10	2	10	19	27	37	8	9	16	6	29	8	25	27	7	33	2733
21	Buddy Baker	3	10	32	3	32		31	25		5		**7**			7	1			28	10		6	7	25	22		6	29	2	20	2621
22	Ronnie Thomas	17	23	27	24	24	17	18	35	15	25	15	DNQ	33	21	24	24	23	20	20	DNQ	12	30	17	24	21	21		19	DNQ	27	2515
23	Tommy Gale	27	32	21	23	14	19	22	13	28	27	20	35		25	26	23	28	24	38	28	23	29	30	28	19	24	31	10	19		2507
24	D. K. Ulrich			18		10	13	13			18	13	23	16	16	22		30	17		33		16	10	12	18	20	20	11	21	26	2400
25	Trevor Boys **(R)**							29		19	32	22	20	32	14	18	17	13	14	17	19	17	28	9	31	11	19	16	32	11	24	2293
26	J. D. McDuffie	29	25	30	36	17	DNQ		DNQ	18	23	24	26	24	19	34		17	25	23	32	25	37	11	36	13	26	DNQ	14	32	30	2197
27	Lake Speed	25	15	4	15	28	8	23	3				6		12	19	29			26	8		15					11	28	12		2114
28	Cale Yarborough	1		9	1	6			**29**		22		28		27	1	**40**			**24**	1		7					10	36	23		1960
29	Benny Parsons	42			14	34			2		29		34		5	13	26		31	22	13		8					3		25	2	1657
30	Mark Martin	28	24	11	7	3	26	27	36	21			29			27	19			10	18		17					33		DNQ		1627
31	Ronnie Hopkins **(R)**	19		17	21	30	24	30		29	26	17			26	17						28	40									1147
32	Jody Ridley	10			17	27			32				DNQ				8			31	15		33					12		10		1050
33	David Pearson	8				22			31				39			35	3			25	9		10					39				943
34	Lennie Pond	12		31			12	14	19				DNQ				10				22		39	28					8			887
35	Ken Ragan **(R)**				27				12				17				12			14			19					38		17		836
36	Bobby Wawak	DNQ	DNQ	16	18	16	DNQ		DNQ				18			37	27		27	34	DNQ	DNQ	21									825
37	Bobby Hillin Jr. **(R)**	DNQ		25	19	DNQ	16						11		37		15		16	13	25		41		11			36			DNQ	737
38	Slick Johnson	DNQ	27	23	34	29	25	28					24						37				27						20			905
39	Mike Potter	DNQ				DNQ						28			22	DNQ			21	30	DNQ	24	36	19		20	29		31	22		662
40	Cecil Gordon		DNQ				DNQ		16		21				23		22		23	33					15							649
41	Rick Newsom	DNQ	DNQ	28		DNQ	DNQ	20	DNQ	23	14	19	31																			573
42	Dean Combs												13								20				33			32		8		500
43	Phil Parsons	13							28												31							19		28		458
44	Bob Senneker				28								27			14					16									15		436
45	Jerry Bowman	DNQ	DNQ								13				36				28						30				25			419
46	Clark Dwyer	21					DNQ		39								25		40		DNQ				10							411
47	Greg Sacks																38		29		17							30		38		359
48	Rick McCray						23	24						27																	39	313
49	Delma Cowart	31															35											35		24		277
50	Philip Duffie	DNQ							38				30										34					27				265
51	Eddie Bierschwale				26											DNQ					26									34		231
52	Jim Robinson													11																	21	230
53	Hershel McGriff													26																	8	227
54	Dean Roper	15							18																							227
55	Sumner McKnight													15																	19	224
56	Butch Lindley		11																							25						223
57	John McFadden						DNQ																29					28		35		213
58	Doug Wheeler													21																	18	209
59	Glenn Francis													14																	28	200
60	Jocko Maggiacomo	DNQ									36				35				26													198
61	H. B. Bailey				22								22			DNQ					DNQ											194
62	Bob Riley														32				38						29							192
63	Don Waterman													20																	25	191
64	Dick May					21					33					DNQ			33				23							22		191
65	Steve Moore	DNQ							22							23																191
66	Mark Stahl																									23	23			DNQ		188
67	Bill Schmitt													9																	40	181
68	Jim Sauter	18	19	26	29																							21				176
69	Rick Baldwin	20								42			DNQ				36												13	27		174
70	Randy Becker													36																	15	173
71	Scott Miller													30																	22	170
72	John Callis										20				33				DNQ											DNQ		167
73	Travis Tiller	DNQ				15			DNQ											39								DNQ		DNQ		164
74	Jim Bown													23																	35	152
75	Tom Sneva	7														32																146
76	A. J. Foyt	11			38				34								Wth															130
77	Pat Mintey													37																	29	128
78	Joe Fields		26																					15	14							121
79	Tommy Ellis												15																			118
80	Blackie Wangerin	DNQ	DNQ														39				DNQ								34			115
81	Jimmy Ingalls										17														18					DNQ		112
82	Bobby Gerhart														38				34													110
83	Ron Esau													35																	38	107
84	Bob Kennedy													19																	DNQ	106
85	Darryl Sage	DNQ	DNQ		20					26								26														103
86	Steve Gray									22					24			21														100
87	Rodney Combs	Wth																										22				97
88	Jim Vandiver				39								21																			88
89	Jimmy Walker		DNQ															29	DNQ								27					82
90	Ed Baugess						DNQ																				30			DNQ		73
91	Dave Dion		30				DNQ																									73
92	John Krebs																														32	67
93	Natz Peters																				DNQ				34					DNQ		61
94	Ernie Cline			35																												58
95	Grant Adcox																			36												55
96	Glenn Jarrett															DNQ			36													55
97	Roy Smith																														36	55
98	David Simko	DNQ			37											DNQ					DNQ											52
99	Rick Wilson								37																							52
100	Bosco Lowe	39																										DNQ				46
101	Connie Saylor	DNQ							40								18															43
102	Dick Skillen	DNQ																		40												43
103	Elliott Forbes-Robinson	40																														43
104	Jimmy Insolo																														42	37
105	Al Elmore																	18	22	19	DNQ	16										
106	Don Satterfield								DNQ									25				19		29								
107	Laurent Rioux	DNQ																							19	17		DNQ				
108	James Hylton	23	21																													
109	Donnie Allison																													36	14	
110	Joe Millikan	DNQ					18																									
111	John Anderson																											24				
112	Lowell Cowell	DNQ							26																							
113	Billie Harvey																			37	DNQ											
114	Joe Booher	DNQ														DNQ					DNQ									39		
115	Bruce Jacobi	DNQ																														
116	Ronnie Sanders	DNQ																														
117	Ferrel Harris	DNQ																														
118	Alan West	DNQ																														
119	Mike Kempton	DNQ																														
120	Rusty Wallace	DNQ																														
121	Ralph Jones	DNQ																														
122	Bill Scott	DNQ				DNQ			DNQ																							
123	Ken Kalla	DNQ							DNQ																							
124	Jim Hurlbert	Wth														DNQ																
125	Jeff Halverson																				DNQ											
126	Maurice Randall																				DNQ											
127	Randy Baker																											DNQ				
128	Wayne Peterson																												DNQ	DNQ		
129	John Ingalls																													DNQ		
130	Dennis DeVea																													DNQ		
131	Jim Southard																													DNQ		
132	Graham Duxbury																													DNQ		
133	John Haver	Wth																												DNQ		
134	Mark Perry																														DNQ	
134	St. James Davis																														DNQ	
135	Steve Pfeifer																														DNQ	
136	Harry Goularte																														DNQ	
137	Dan Noble																														DNQ	
138	Tony Settember																														DNQ	
139	Al Loquasto	Wth																														
140	Chet Fillip	Wth																														
141	Howard Mark	Wth																														
142	Mike Alexander																									Wth						
Pos.	Driver	DAY	RCH	CAR	ATL	DAR	NWS	MAR	TAL	NSV	DOV	BRI	CLT	RIV	POC	MCH	DAY	NSV	POC	TAL	MCH	BRI	DAR	RCH	DOV	MAR	NWS	CLT	CAR	ATL	RIV	Pts

== Rookie of the year ==
Sterling Marlin was named NASCAR Rookie of the Year. He beat Trevor Boys, Bobby Hillin Jr., Ronnie Hopkins, and Ken Ragan for the award. Of the drivers that competed for the award, only Marlin ran all 30 races. The closest a driver got to competing in all 30 races was Trevor Boys competing in 23 races (skipped rounds 1–6, and 8).

== See also ==
- 1983 NASCAR Budweiser Late Model Sportsman Series
- 1983 NASCAR Winston West Series
