= Rioux (disambiguation) =

Rioux may refer to:

- Rioux, French commune in Charente-Maritime
- Rioux-Martin, French commune in Charente
- Christien Rioux, computer security specialist
- Erin Rioux, a NYC-based musician
- Geneviève Rioux (b. 1961), Canadian actress
- Gerry Rioux (b. 1959), Canadian hockey player
- Jean-Antoine Rioux (1925–2017), French parasitologist
- Jean-Pierre Rioux (1939–2024), French historian
- Johnny Rioux (b. 1974), American musician
- Laurent Rioux, Canadian NASCAR driver
- Olivier Rioux (b. 2006), Canadian basketball player
- Pierre Rioux (b. 1962), Canadian hockey player
