= Harry Melling (NASCAR owner) =

American businessman and stock car team owner

Harry Melling (June 13, 1945 – May 29, 1999) was the team owner of Melling Racing, which won the 1988 NASCAR Winston Cup Series championship with Bill Elliott.

== Background ==
Melling graduated from Ferris State University. Melling succeeded his father Benjamin as President of The Melling Tool Company in 1975, and subsequently now owned by his son Mark, with his son Brendan now in the family succession plan. Melling Tool is a maker of automotive products. Melling also owned Treetops Sylvan Resort in Gaylord, Michigan, turning a small local ski hill into a national skiing and golfing destination, which was sold by the family after his death.

== NASCAR team owner ==
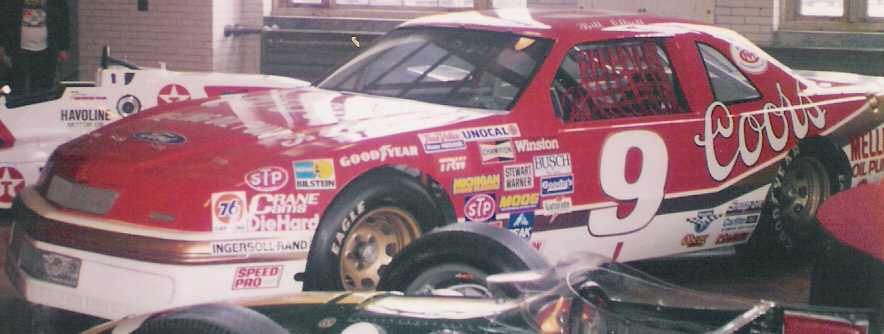
Melling Racing car that set the record for the fastest recorded time in a stock car - 212.809 mph (342.483 km/h) at Talladega Superspeedway

Melling's first involvement in NASCAR began in 1979 as a primary sponsor for Benny Parsons. Melling Racing won the NASCAR Winston Cup points championship with Bill Elliott.

== Death ==
Melling died of a heart attack at his golf course in Gaylord, Michigan, at age 53. At the Michigan race two weeks later, which is usually the team's homecoming, the team raced a red and white Cartoon Network (the sponsor in the 1999 season) with the team's driver Jerry Nadeau. On the decklid, a decal said "To Harry! We miss you". Harry's favorite colors were red and white, and semi-served as a team throwback. His son, Mark ran his team for a few more years.

== Awards ==
- Posthumously inducted in the Michigan Motor Sports Hall of Fame (2004)
- Melling was named one of NASCAR's "40 most important people in NASCAR history" by Winston Cup Scene, an industry NASCAR magazine, in 1997.
