= 1983 Daytona 500 =

Auto race held at Daytona International Speedway in 1983

Race details
- Race 1 of 30 in the 1983 NASCAR Winston Cup Series season
- 1983 Daytona 500 program cover
- Date: February 20, 1983
- Location: Daytona International Speedway, Daytona Beach, Florida
- Course: Permanent racing facility 2.5 mi (4.02336 km)
- Distance: 200 laps, 500 mi (804.672 km)
- Weather: Temperatures of 70 °F (21 °C); wind speeds of 13 miles per hour (21 km/h)
- Average speed: 155.979 miles per hour (251.024 km/h)
- Attendance: 115,000

Pole position
Driver	Ricky Rudd	Richard Childress Racing

Qualifying race winners
Duel 1 Winner	Dale Earnhardt	Bud Moore Engineering
Duel 2 Winner	Neil Bonnett	RahMoc Enterprises

Most laps led
Driver	Joe Ruttman	Benfield Racing
- Laps: 57

Winner
No. 28	Cale Yarborough	Ranier-Lundy

Television in the United States
- Network: CBS
- Announcers: Ken Squier and David Hobbs
- Nielsen ratings: 8.7/26 (11 million viewers)

The 1983 Daytona 500, the 25th running of the event, was held February 20 at Daytona International Speedway in Daytona Beach, Florida as the first race of the 1983 NASCAR Winston Cup season.

== Summary ==
Cale Yarborough was the first driver to run a qualifying lap of more than 200 miles per hour (320 km/h) at Daytona in his #28 Chevrolet Monte Carlo. However, on his second of two qualifying laps, Yarborough crashed and flipped his car in turn four. The car was destroyed in the crash, and Ranier-Lundy did not have a back up car for Yarborough to race. Thus, the team had to scramble to find a replacement and eventually found a Hardee’s restaurant displaying a Pontiac LeMans painted like the #28 and used for promotional purposes; that car was brought to Daytona and restored to racing condition, with Yarborough starting it from the eighth position.

Ricky Rudd wound up with the pole, driving Richard Childress' Chevrolet in what would become a breakthrough season for the longtime independent driver Childress. The early laps were a battle between Geoff Bodine, Richard Petty, Dale Earnhardt, Kyle Petty, and a resurgent Dick Brooks. Richard broke away from the field before his engine failed after 47 laps and the race became a showdown between Bodine, Yarborough, Joe Ruttman, Brooks, Neil Bonnett, Buddy Baker, and Bill Elliott, while former Talladega 500 winner Ron Bouchard was also in contention.

On Lap 63, the engine on the Bud Moore Engineering Ford driven by Earnhardt failed. As the race went on the lead bounced back and forth, and Bobby Allison, who'd lost a lap, crowded the leaders most of the day. Past halfway Kyle Petty blew his engine and a tire issue dropped Bonnett off the lead lap; when Mark Martin hit the wall Ruttman swerved to stop Bonnett from getting his lap back as they raced through a group of lapped cars. Bonnett got his lap back later but blew his engine in the final twenty laps while Brooks cut a tire and lost a lap.

On the final lap, Baker led Yarborough, Ruttman, and Elliott. Cale stormed past Baker on the backstretch and Ruttman drafted into second; Baker dove under Ruttman and Elliott snookered them both on the high side in a three-abreast photo finish for second. The win was Cale's third in the 500 and was also the first time that an in-car camera of a car went into victory lane before a national CBS Sports audience.

=== Waltrip-Brooks incident ===
With Brooks as the leader, the field slowed down coming back to the yellow. Two cars, though, tried to get their lap back by beating the leader back to the finish line, a practice banned subsequently in 2003 - Lake Speed passed Brooks in Turn Four and then moved into his path; Brooks braked and Darrell Waltrip spun to avoid hitting Brooks; Waltrip's Chevrolet struck the inside guardrail and flew backward back onto the racetrack, nearly collecting Yarborough, Bodine, and Ruttman.

Waltrip suffered a concussion, resulting in an overnight hospitalization. He returned the next week at Richmond, since prohibited after a 2014 rule change mandating drivers take a concussion test which he would have failed, as NASCAR, like most motorsport following the rule change, requires drivers sit out considerable time after a concussion and not be allowed to race until the driver clears a concussion test. Waltrip admitted in his biography DW: A Lifetime Going Round in Circles (published in 2002) that it was a life-changing crash: when he heard drivers and fans joking that the crash would "knock him conscious" or "finally shut him up", he realized for the first time how unpopular he was and resolved to clean up his image. Waltrip often referenced the crash when asked to be a keynote speaker at national events. The family now believes this severe concussion and not sitting out races is related to his 2026 diagnosis of frontaltemporal brain disorder and the family's belief he suffers from chronic traumatic encephalopathy.

The practice of allowing lapped cars to attempt passing the leader at the finish line when taking the caution was prohibited after the 2003 Sylvania 300 at Loudon, NH when after Dale Jarrett crashed and numerous cars nearly struck Jarrett's disabled car on the race to gain a lap back, leading to the development of the current beneficiary rule. The concussion protocol was adopted in 2014 after Dale Earnhardt Jr. took himself out of two races in the 2012 season after two concussions—one in August (Kansas tire test) and in October (Talladega race crash).

=== Did not qualify ===
Drivers who failed to qualify for this event included Blackie Wangerin, Joe Millikan, Connie Saylor, Morgan Shepherd, Rusty Wallace and David Simko.

Because of the format of the Daytona 500, heat races were established. The qualifying races were marred by two serious crashes on the backstretch. Bruce Jacobi was killed in a Lap 6 crash of in the first of two 50-lap qualifying races, flipping violently on the backstretch as the roll cage filed. Although he survived the initial impact, he suffered brain stem injuries and was comatose until his death in 1987. On Lap 27 of the second race, Rusty Wallace and Rick Wilson made contact on the backstretch, and Wallace's car violently flipped on the backstretch. Wallace was injured, but survived and the next year began a full-time career that led him to the NASCAR Hall of Fame.

== Finishing Order ==
Pos	Grid	No.	Driver	Car Make	Laps	Status	Laps led	Points
1	8	28	Cale Yarborough	Pontiac LeMans	200	Running	23	180
2	17	9	Bill Elliott	Ford Thunderbird	200	Running	6	175
3	5	21	Buddy Baker	Ford Thunderbird	200	Running	35	170
4	11	98	Joe Ruttman	Chevrolet Monte Carlo	200	Running	57	170
5	10	90	Dick Brooks	Ford Thunderbird	199	Running	15	160
6	41	44	Terry Labonte	Chevrolet Monte Carlo	199	Running	0	150
7	22	53	Tom Sneva	Chevrolet Monte Carlo	199	Running	0	146
8	15	16	David Pearson	Chevrolet Monte Carlo	198	Running	0	142
9	35	22	Bobby Allison	Chevrolet Monte Carlo	198	Running	0	138
10	18	84	Jody Ridley	Buick Regal	197	Running	0	134
11	9	14	A. J. Foyt	Chevrolet Monte Carlo	197	Running	0	130
12	39	51	Lennie Pond	Buick Regal	197	Running	0	127
13	32	66	Phil Parsons	Buick Regal	196	Running	0	124
14	42	52	Jimmy Means	Buick Regal	196	Running	0	121
15	27	89	Dean Roper	Pontiac Grand Prix	194	Running	0	118
16	34	67	Buddy Arrington	Chrysler Imperial	194	Running	0	115
17	36	41	Ronnie Thomas	Pontiac Grand Prix	192	Running	0	112
18	20	6	Jim Sauter	Chevrolet Monte Carlo	191	Running	0	109
19	28	26	Ronnie Hopkins	Buick Regal	191	Running	0	106
20	30	04	Rick Baldwin	Dodge Mirada	188	Running	0	103
21	40	10	Clark Dwyer	Chevrolet Monte Carlo	188	Running	0	100
22	4	75	Neil Bonnett	Chevrolet Monte Carlo	187	Running	9	102
23	29	48	James Hylton	Chevrolet Monte Carlo	184	Running	0	94
24	1	3	Ricky Rudd	Chevrolet Monte Carlo	182	Camshaft	1	96
25	16	1	Lake Speed	Chevrolet Monte Carlo	178	Engine	0	88
26	23	47	Ron Bouchard	Buick Regal	162	Engine	0	85
27	25	64	Tommy Gale	Ford Thunderbird	149	Engine	0	82
28	12	2	Mark Martin	Buick Regal	136	Crash	0	79
29	37	70	J. D. McDuffie	Pontiac Grand Prix	132	Engine	0	76
30	2	88	Geoffrey Bodine	Pontiac Grand Prix	106	Engine	14	78
31	38	0	Delma Cowart	Buick Regal	102	Crash	0	70
32	21	71	Dave Marcis	Chevrolet Monte Carlo	100	Piston	0	67
33	7	7	Kyle Petty	Pontiac Grand Prix	99	Engine	9	69
34	33	17	Sterling Marlin	Chevrolet Monte Carlo	69	Piston	0	61
35	3	15	Dale Earnhardt	Ford Thunderbird	63	Engine	2	63
36	31	11	Darrell Waltrip	Chevrolet Monte Carlo	62	Crash	0	55
37	13	33	Harry Gant	Buick Regal	56	Engine	0	52
38	6	43	Richard Petty	Pontiac Grand Prix	47	Engine	29	54
39	26	32	Bosco Lowe	Buick Regal	36	Crash	0	46
40	19	23	Elliott Forbes-Robinson	Buick Regal	36	Engine	0	43
41	24	27	Tim Richmond	Pontiac LeMans	24	Engine	0	40
42	14	55	Benny Parsons	Buick Regal	8	Push Rod	0	37

Preceded by 1982 Winston Western 500	NASCAR Winston Cup Series Season; 1982-83	Succeeded by 1983 Richmond 400
