= 1983 Talladega 500 =

Race details
- Race 19 of 30 in the 1983 NASCAR Winston Cup Series season
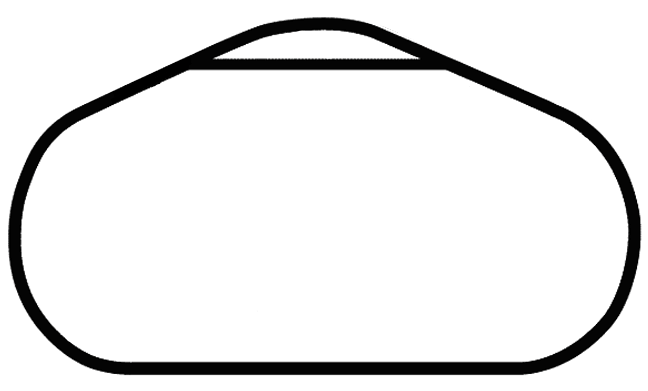
- Layout of Talladega Superspeedway
- Date: July 31, 1983
- Official name: Talladega 500
- Location: Alabama International Motor Speedway, Talladega, Alabama
- Course: Permanent racing facility
- Course length: 4.280 km (2.660 miles)
- Distance: 188 laps, 500.1 mi (804.8 km)
- Weather: Cloudy, 81 °F (27 °C), 70% humidity, 20% chance of precipitation, wind from the NW at 12 mph (19 km/h)
- Average speed: 170.611 miles per hour (274.572 km/h)
- Attendance: 95,000

Pole position
Driver	Cale Yarborough	Harry Ranier

Most laps led
Driver	Dale Earnhardt; Tim Richmond	Bud Moore; Raymond Beadle
- Laps: 41

Winner
No. 15	Dale Earnhardt	Bud Moore

Television in the United States
- Network: CBS
- Announcers: Ken Squier; Ned Jarrett

Radio in the United States
- Radio: MRN
- Booth announcers: Barney Hall; Eli Gold
- Turn announcers: Dave DeSpain (1 & 2); Mike Garrell (Backstretch); Dave Sutherland (3 & 4)

The 1983 Talladega 500 was a NASCAR Winston Cup Series event on July 31, 1983, at Alabama International Motor Speedway in Talladega, Alabama.

== Background ==
Talladega Superspeedway, originally known as Alabama International Motor Superspeedway (AIMS), is a motorsports complex located north of Talladega, Alabama. It is located on the former Anniston Air Force Base in the small city of Lincoln. The track is a Tri-oval and was constructed by International Speedway Corporation, a business controlled by the France Family, in the 1960s. Talladega is most known for its steep banking and the unique location of the start/finish line - located just past the exit to pit road. The track currently hosts the NASCAR series such as the Sprint Cup Series, Xfinity Series, and the Camping World Truck Series. Talladega Superspeedway is the longest NASCAR oval with a length of 2.66 miles (4.28 km), and the track at its peak had a seating capacity of 175,000 spectators.

== Qualifying ==
=== Qualifying results ===
Pos	No.	Driver	Team	Manufacturer	Speed
1	28	Cale Yarborough			201.744
2	9	Bill Elliott		Ford	199.675
3	55	Benny Parsons		Chevrolet	
4	15	Dale Earnhardt	Bud Moore Engineering	Ford	199.309
5	90	Dick Brooks			
6	21	Buddy Baker			
7	44	Terry Labonte			
8	4	Mark Martin			
9	88	Geoff Bodine			
10	11	Darrell Waltrip	Junior Johnson & Associates	Chevrolet	198.322
11	1	Lake Speed			
12	43	Richard Petty	Petty Enterprises	Pontiac	196.737
13	7	Kyle Petty			
14	75	Neil Bonnett			
15	16	David Pearson			
16	29	Grant Adcox			
17	3	Ricky Rudd			
18	27	Tim Richmond	Blue Max Racing	Pontiac	196.145
19	47	Ron Bouchard			
20	84	Jody Ridley			
21	98	Joe Ruttman			
22	17	Sterling Marlin			
23	33	Harry Gant	Mach 1 Racing	Buick	195.090
24	22	Bobby Allison		Buick	
25	67	Buddy Arrington		Chrysler	
26	48	Trevor Boys			
27	74	Bobby Wawak			
28	24	Cecil Gordon			
29	77	Ken Ragan			
30	31	Billie Harvey			
31	8	Bobby Hillin Jr.			
32	2	Morgan Sheperd			
33	6	Al Elmore			
34	64	Tommy Gale			
35	76	Mike Potter			
36	71	Dave Marcis			
37	41	Ronnie Thomas			
38	70	J.D. McDuffie			
39	78	Dick Skillen			
40	46	Travis Tiller			

== Race ==
Forty drivers made the grid; Trevor Boys was the only driver not to be born in the United States. The race lasted almost three hours for the scheduled 188 laps. Dick Skillen was the last-place finisher due to a crash on the first lap with Travis Tiller, Tommy Gale, Billie Harvey, Grant Adcox, and Neil Bonnett. J.D. McDuffie was the lowest-finishing driver to finish the race; he was 44 laps behind the leaders. 95,000 people attended this race. Neil Bonnett driving in relief for Tim Richmond was leading the race with 12 laps to go when he pitted for fuel only. The car stalled and it took long enough to get it re-fired that Earnhardt and Waltrip were able to get by.

Cale Yarborough would qualify for the pole position with a speed of 201.744 miles per hour (324.675 km/h). Dale Earnhardt would defeat Darrell Waltrip by four car lengths in this race; securing his last victory for an owner other than Richard Childress. Harvey and Tiller would retire from NASCAR after this race. Individual earnings for each driver ranged from the winner's share of $46,950 ($148,222.7 when adjusted for inflation) to the last-place finisher's share of $1,450 ($4,577.7 when adjusted for inflation). The total prize purse was $316,700 ($999,832.38 when adjusted for inflation).

=== Race results ===
Pos	Grid	No.	Driver	Team	Manufacturer	Laps	Points
1	4	15	Dale Earnhardt	Bud Moore Engineering	Ford	188	185
2	10	11	Darrell Waltrip	Junior Johnson & Associates	Chevrolet	188	175
3	18	27	Neil Bonnett†	Blue Max Racing	Pontiac	188	175
4	12	43	Richard Petty	Petty Enterprises	Pontiac	188	165
5	23	33	Harry Gant	Mach 1 Racing	Buick	188	155
6	9	88	Geoff Bodine	Cliff Stewart Racing	Pontiac	188	155
7	5	90	Dick Brooks	Donlavey Racing	Ford	187	146
8	2	9	Bill Elliott	Melling Racing	Ford	187	142
9	24	22	Bobby Allison	DiGard Motorsport	Buick	186	143
10	8	4	Mark Martin	Morgan-McClure Motorsports	Chevrolet	186	143
11							
12							
13							
14							
15							
16							
17							
18							
19							
20							
21							
22							
23							
24							
25							
26							
27							
28							
29							
30							
31							
32							
33							
34							
35							
36							
37							
38							
39							
40							

† Bonnett crashed his car on lap 2, but drove Richmond's car after Richmond retired due to debris in his eyes

=== Race summary ===
- Lead changes: 46 among different drivers
- Cautions/Laps: 2 for 16
- Red flags: 0
- Time of race: 2 hours, 55 minutes and 52 seconds
- Average speed: 170.611 miles per hour (274.572 km/h)

== Media ==
=== Television ===
CBS Television
Booth announcers	Pit reporters
Lap-by-lap: Ken Squier; Color-commentator: Ned Jarrett	Larry Nuber; Mike Joy

=== Radio ===
MRN Radio
Booth announcers	Turn announcers	Pit reporters
Lead announcer: Barney Hall; Announcer: Eli Gold	Turns 1 & 2: Dave DeSpain; Backstretch: Mark Garrell; Turns 3 & 4: Dave Sutherland	Jerry Punch; Bill Bowser

== Standings after the race ==
Drivers' Championship standings

	Pos	Driver	Points	Differential
	1	Bobby Allison	2947	0
	2	Darrell Waltrip	2777	-170
1	3	Harry Gant	2678	-269
1	4	Bill Elliott	2677	-270
	5	Richard Petty	2604	-343
	6	Neil Bonnett	2483	-464
1	7	Joe Ruttman	2326	-621
2	8	Dale Earnhardt	2309	-638
	9	Ricky Rudd	2303	-644
3	10	Terry Labonte	2302	-645

Manufacturers' Championship standings

Pos	Manufacturer	Points

- Note: Only the first 10 positions are included for the driver standings.

Preceded by 1983 Like Cola 500	NASCAR Winston Cup Series Season; 1983	Succeeded by 1983 Champion Spark Plug 400

Preceded by 1982	Talladega 500 races 1983	Succeeded by 1984
