= 1983 Winston 500 =

Auto race held at Alabama International Motor Speedway in 1983

Race details
- Race 8 of 30 in the 1983 NASCAR Winston Cup Series season
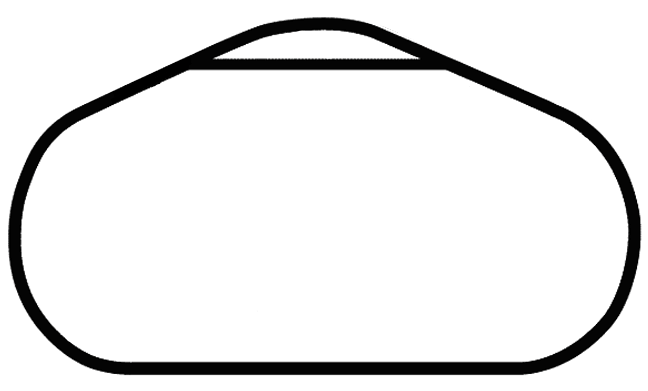
- Layout of Talladega Superspeedway
- Date: May 1, 1983
- Official name: Winston 500
- Location: Alabama International Motor Speedway, Talladega, Alabama
- Course: Permanent racing facility
- Course length: 4.280 km (2.660 miles)
- Distance: 188 laps, 500.1 mi (804.8 km)
- Weather: Warm with temperatures of 84.9 °F (29.4 °C); wind speeds of 11.8 miles per hour (19.0 km/h)
- Average speed: 153.936 miles per hour (247.736 km/h)
- Attendance: 110,000

Pole position
| Driver | Cale Yarborough | Ranier Racing |

Most laps led
| Driver | Richard Petty | Petty Enterprises |
- Laps: 52

Winner
| No. 43 | Richard Petty | Petty Enterprises |

Television in the United States
- Network: NBC
- Announcers: Paul Page; Johnny Rutherford

Radio in the United States
- Radio: MRN
- Booth announcers: Barney Hall; Mike Joy
- Turn announcers: Eli Gold (1 & 2); Dave DeSpain (Backstretch); Dave Sutherland (3 & 4)

The 1983 Winston 500 was a NASCAR Winston Cup Series event that took place on May 1, 1983, at Alabama International Motor Speedway (now Talladega Superspeedway) in Talladega, Alabama.

== Background ==
Talladega Superspeedway, originally known as Alabama International Motor Superspeedway (AIMS), is a motorsports complex located north of Talladega, Alabama. It is located on the former Anniston Air Force Base in the small city of Lincoln. The track is a Tri-oval and was constructed by International Speedway Corporation, a business controlled by the France Family, in the 1960s. Talladega is most known for its steep banking and the unique location of the start/finish line - located just past the exit to pit road. The track currently hosts the NASCAR series such as the Monster Energy Cup Series, Xfinity Series, and the Camping World Truck Series. Talladega Superspeedway is the longest NASCAR oval with a length of 2.66 miles (4.28 km), and the track at its peak had a seating capacity of 175,000 spectators.

== Qualifying ==
=== Qualifying results ===
| Pos | No. | Driver | Team | Manufacturer | Speed |
|---|---|---|---|---|---|
| 1 | 28 | Cale Yarborough | Ranier-Lundy Racing | Chevrolet | 202.650 |
| 2 | 98 | Joe Ruttman | Benfield Racing | Chevrolet | |
| 3 | 88 | Geoff Bodine | Cliff Stewart Racing | Pontiac | |
| 4 | 3 | Ricky Rudd | Richard Childress Racing | Chevrolet | |
| 5 | 75 | Neil Bonnett | RahMoc Enterprises | Chevrolet | |
| 6 | 9 | Bill Elliott | Melling Racing | Ford | 200.318 |
| 7 | 44 | Terry Labonte | Hagan Racing | Chevrolet | |
| 8 | 27 | Tim Richmond | Blue Max Racing | Pontiac | |
| 9 | 66 | Phil Parsons | Johnny Hayes Racing | Pontiac | |
| 10 | 1 | Lake Speed | Ellington Racing | Chevrolet | 198.479 |
| 11 | 21 | Buddy Baker | Wood Brothers | Ford | |
| 12 | 55 | Benny Parsons | Johnny Hayes Racing | Buick | 198.076 |
| 13 | 14 | AJ Foyt | AJ Foyt Enterprises | Chevrolet | |
| 14 | 11 | Darrell Waltrip | Junior Johnson & Associates | Chevrolet | |
| 15 | 43 | Richard Petty | Petty Enterprises | Pontiac | 197.488 |
| 16 | 16 | David Pearson | Bobby Hawkins Racing | Chevrolet | |
| 17 | 15 | Dale Earnhardt | Bud Moore Engineering | Ford | |
| 18 | 7 | Kyle Petty | Petty Enterprises | Pontiac | |
| 19 | 22 | Bobby Allison | DiGard Motorsports | Buick | |
| 20 | 90 | Dick Brooks | Donlavey Racing | Ford | |
| 21 | 33 | Harry Gant | Mach 1 Racing | Buick | 196.338 |
| 22 | 17 | Sterling Marlin | Hamby Racing | Chevrolet | |
| 23 | 47 | Ron Bouchard | Race Hill Farm Team | Buick | |
| 24 | 48 | Lennie Pond | Hylton Motorsports | Chevrolet | |
| 25 | 6 | Mark Martin | Ulrich Racing | Chevrolet | |
| 26 | 10 | Clark Dwyer | Hamby Racing | Chevrolet | |
| 27 | 2 | Morgan Shepherd | Jim Stacy Racing | Buick | |
| 28 | 24 | Cecil Gordon | Gordon Racing | Chrysler | |
| 29 | 84 | Jody Ridley | Robert McEntyre Racing | Buick | |
| 30 | 89 | Dean Roper | Mueller Brothers | Pontiac | |
| 31 | 64 | Tommy Gale | Langley Racing | Ford | |
| 32 | 71 | Dave Marcis | Marcis Auto Racing | Chevrolet | |
| 33 | 4 | Connie Saylor | Morgan-McClure Motorsports | Oldsmobile | |
| 34 | 62 | Rick Wilson | Wilson Racing | Buick | |
| 35 | 96 | Rick Baldwin | Will Cronkrite Racing | Buick | |
| 36 | 77 | Ken Ragan | Branch-Ragan Racing | Buick | |
| 37 | 76 | Lowell Cowell | Potter Racing | Oldsmobile | |
| 38 | 73 | Steve Moore | Steve Moore Racing | Pontiac | |
| 39 | 99 | Philip Duffie | Duffie Racing | Buick | |
| 40 | 67 | Buddy Arrington | Arrington Racing | Chrysler | |
| 41 | 52 | Jimmy Means | Means Racing | Buick | |
| 42 | 41 | Ronnie Thomas | Thomas Racing | Pontiac | |

== Race ==
There were 42 American-born drivers on the grid, representing manufacturers Pontiac, Buick, Chevrolet, and Ford. Cale Yarborough qualified for the pole position with a speed of 202.650 miles per hour (326.134 km/h). Richard Petty defeated Benny Parsons by two car lengths after three hours and fourteen minutes to earn his 197th career win. Seven cautions for 42 laps were witnessed by 110,000 spectators in addition to 27 lead changes. The average speed of the race was 153.936 miles per hour (247.736 km/h). There was a major incident involving Phil Parsons and ten other drivers. Two photographers managed to get Parsons out of the wreck. The entire race purse was $361,820 ($1,142,277.71 when adjusted for inflation).

Harry Gant finished 4th and took the points lead from Bobby Allison as a result of the 31-point swing. Neil Bonnett came in third in points and maintained that position although he lost ground as a result of the issues that left him with a 15th-place finish, seven laps down.

Dale Earnhardt was driving a Ford Thunderbird for team owner Bud Moore this year. Lowell Cowell would retire from NASCAR after this race.

=== Race results ===
| Pos | Grid | No. | Driver | Team | Manufacturer | Laps | Points |
|---|---|---|---|---|---|---|---|
| 1 | 15 | 43 | Richard Petty | Petty Enterprises | Pontiac | 188 | 185 |
| 2 | 12 | 55 | Benny Parsons | Johnny Hayes Racing | Buick | 188 | 175 |
| 3 | 10 | 1 | Lake Speed | Ellington Racing | Chevrolet | 188 | 170 |
| 4 | 21 | 33 | Harry Gant | Mach 1 Racing | Buick | 188 | 165 |
| 5 | 6 | 9 | Bill Elliott | Melling Racing | Ford | 188 | 160 |
| 6 | 7 | 44 | Terry Labonte | | Chevrolet | | |
| 7 | 41 | 52 | Jimmy Means | | Buick | | |
| 8 | | 3 | Ricky Rudd | Richard Childress Racing | Chevrolet | | |
| 9 | | | Dave Marcis | | | | |
| 10 | | 22 | Bobby Allison | DiGard Racing | | | |
| 11 | | | Joe Ruttman | | | | |
| 12 | | | Ken Ragan | | | | |
| 13 | | | Tommy Gale | | | | |
| 14 | | | Dick Brooks | | | | |
| 15 | | 75 | Neil Bonnett | RahMoc Racing | | | |
| 16 | | | Cecil Gordon | | | | |
| 17 | | | Morgan Shepherd | | | | |
| 18 | | | Dean Roper | | | | |
| 19 | | | Lennie Pond | | | | |
| 20 | | | Ron Bouchard | | | | |
| 21 | | | Geoff Bodine | | | | |
| 22 | | | Steve Moore | | | | |
| 23 | | | Buddy Arrington | | | | |
| 24 | | 15 | Dale Earnhardt | Bud Moore Engineering | Ford | | |
| 25 | | 21 | Buddy Baker | Wood Brothers Racing | Ford | | |
| 26 | | | Lowell Cowell | | | | |
| 27 | | 27 | Tim Richmond | Blue Max Racing | Pontiac | | |
| 28 | 9 | 66 | Phil Parsons | | | | |
| 29 | | 28 | Cale Yarborough | Ranier Racing | Chevrolet | | |
| 30 | 18 | 7 | Kyle Petty | Petty Enterprises | Pontiac | 71 | 73 |
| 31 | | | David Pearson | | | | |
| 32 | | | Jody Ridley | | | | |
| 33 | | 11 | Darrell Waltrip | Junior Johnson & Associates | Chevrolet | | |
| 34 | | 14 | A.J. Foyt | A.J. Foyt Racing | Oldsmobile | | |
| 35 | | | Ronnie Thomas | | | | |
| 36 | | | Mark Martin | | | | |
| 37 | | | Rick Wilson | | | | |
| 38 | | | Philip Duffie | | | | |
| 39 | 26 | 10 | Clark Dwyer | Hamby Motorsports | Chevrolet | 30 | 46 |
| 40 | 33 | 4 | Connie Saylor | Morgan-McClure Motorsports | Oldsmobile | 22 | 43 |
| 41 | 22 | 17 | Sterling Marlin (R) | Hamby Motorsports | Pontiac | 20 | 40 |
| 42 | 35 | 96 | Rick Baldwin | | Buick | 7 | 37 |

=== Race summary ===
- Lead changes: 27 among different drivers
- Cautions/Laps: 7 for 43
- Red flags: 0
- Time of race: 3 hours, 14 minutes and 55 seconds
- Average speed: 153.936 miles per hour (247.736 km/h)

== Media ==
=== Television ===
The television coverage of this race was (on NBC) on a tape-delayed broadcast.

NBC Television
| Booth announcers | Pit reporters |
|---|---|
| Lap-by-lap: Paul Page; Color-commentator: Johnny Rutherford | |

=== Radio ===
MRN Radio
| Booth announcers | Turn announcers | Pit reporters |
|---|---|---|
| Lead announcer: Barney Hall; Announcer: Mike Joy | Turns 1 & 2: Eli Gold; Backstretch: Dave DeSpain; Turns 3 & 4: Dave Sutherland | Ned Jarrett; Jerry Punch |

== Standings after the race ==
Drivers' Championship standings

| | Pos | Driver | Points | Differential |
|---|---|---|---|---|
| 1 | 1 | Harry Gant | 1187 | 0 |
| 1 | 2 | Bobby Allison | 1171 | -16 |
| | 3 | Neil Bonnett | 1133 | -54 |
| | 4 | Joe Ruttman | 1116 | -71 |
| 1 | 5 | Bill Elliott | 1093 | -94 |
| 2 | 6 | Richard Petty | 1065 | -122 |
| 2 | 7 | Dick Brooks | 1058 | -129 |
| 1 | 8 | Ricky Rudd | 1013 | -174 |
| 1 | 9 | Terry Labonte | 985 | -202 |
| 4 | 10 | Lake Speed | 969 | -218 |

Manufacturers' Championship standings

| Pos | Manufacturer | Points |

- Note: Only the first 10 positions are included for the driver standings.

| Preceded by 1983 Virginia National Bank 500 | NASCAR Winston Cup Series Season; 1983 | Succeeded by 1983 Marty Robbins 420 |

| Preceded by 1983 Warner W. Hodgdon Carolina 500 | Richard Petty's Career Wins; 1960-1984 | Succeeded by 1983 Miller High Life 500 |

| Preceded by 1982 | Winston 500 races 1983 | Succeeded by 1984 |
