= 1983 Miller High Life 500 =

Auto race held at Charlotte Motor Speedway in 1983

Race details
- Race 27 of 30 in the 1983 NASCAR Winston Cup Series season
- Layout of Charlotte Motor Speedway
- Date: October 9, 1983
- Official name: Miller High Life 500
- Location: Charlotte Motor Speedway, Concord, North Carolina
- Course: Permanent racing facility
- Course length: 1.500 miles (2.414 km)
- Distance: 334 laps, 500 mi (804.672 km)
- Weather: Temperatures of 73 °F (23 °C); wind speeds of 10.1 miles per hour (16.3 km/h)
- Average speed: 139.998 miles per hour (225.305 km/h)
- Attendance: 118,000

Pole position
Driver	Tim Richmond	Blue Max Racing

Most laps led
Driver	Tim Richmond	Blue Max Racing
- Laps: 99

Winner
No. 43	Richard Petty	Petty Enterprises

Television in the United States
- Network: Mizlou
- Announcers: Ken Squier; Donnie Allison

The 1983 Miller High Life 500 was a NASCAR Winston Cup Series race that took place at Charlotte Motor Speedway in Concord, North Carolina on October 9, 1983.

== Background ==
The race was held in Concord, North Carolina at Charlotte Motor Speedway, a 1.5-mile (2.4 km) quad-oval paved track. The race was the second to be held at the track during the 1983 Winston Cup Series, with the other being the 1983 World 600. Bruton Smith and Curtis Turner began building the track in 1959, and despite numerous delays, the track was finished in 1960 for the inaugural World 600.

== Race report ==
There were 40 drivers on the grid; 39 of them American while Trevor Boys was Canadian. Sterling Marlin finished last due to an engine failure on lap 53. Richard Petty defeated Darrell Waltrip by 3.1 seconds in front of 118,000 spectators in a time of three hours and thirty-four minutes; it was Winston Cup win number 198 in is career. There were 30 different lead changes and eight caution periods for 35 laps.

Tim Richmond won the pole position with a speed of 163.073 miles per hour (262.441 km/h) in qualifying while the average race speed was 139.998 miles per hour (225.305 km/h). Richmond led 99 laps in the race and finished in fifth place.

J.D. McDuffie would fail to qualify for this race along with Laurent Rioux (#38), Bosco Lowe, Randy Baker and Travis Tiller.

Following the last caution flag and pit stops of the race, Darrell Waltrip, driving Junior Johnson's #11 Chevy led the race over Tim Richmond in the #27 Raymond Beadle Pontiac after the restart with 23 laps to go. Richard Petty was in third place. With less than ten laps to go Waltrip's car noticeably slowed and appeared to wiggle slightly exiting turn two and allowed Petty to duck below for the lead and race win. Cale Yarborough in the #28 Ranier Racing Chevy was two laps down and also passed Waltrip and was on Petty's rear bumper at the checkered.

During victory lane celebrations a NASCAR official noticed that Petty's race car had left side tires mounted on the right side of the car, which was a violation of the rules. NASCAR sent Petty's Pontiac into the inspection area for a complete detailed inspection.

After a four-hour inspection of the Petty Enterprises race car, NASCAR determined the engine in Petty's car was over the limit in cubic inches as specified in the rule book. The Petty team was penalized 104 points and fined $35,000 for the rule violations involving the tires and engine. The engine was determined to be 381.983 cubic inches (6,259.58 cc), well over the specifications in the NASCAR rulebook for 1983 which stipulated a maximum of 358 cubic inches (5,870 cc).

Petty co-crew chiefs, Robin Pemberton and Larry Pollard, stated that during the last pit stop of the race they put softer compound bias-ply tires designed for the left side of the cars on the right side of Petty's race car. The softer left side tires provided more traction when attached to the right side of a stock car and worked best when used during cool cloudy weather days which prevents the softer tires from quickly wearing out if mounted on the right side of the cars.

NASCAR allowed the win to stand. NASCAR stated that they wanted fans to leave the track knowing who won the race.

Ironically, ten years earlier at this race the winning Chevy of Cale Yarborough (owned by Junior Johnson) and Richard Petty's second place Dodge were both submitted to long inspections after the race for allegedly having oversized engines. NASCAR admitted in the days after the 1973 race controversy that their pre-race inspection system needed to be improved.

The total amount of prize money was $352,430, and was one of the top paying races of the 1983 season.

=== Top 10 finishers ===
Pos	Grid	No.	Driver	Manufacturer	Laps	Laps led	Points	Time/Status
1	20	43	Richard Petty	Pontiac	334	23	76	3:34:43
2	6	11	Darrell Waltrip	Chevrolet	334	18	175	+3.4 seconds
3	2	55	Benny Parsons	Chevrolet	334	52	170	Lead lap under green flag
4	5	44	Terry Labonte	Chevrolet	334	31	165	Lead lap under green flag
5	1	27	Tim Richmond	Pontiac	334	99	165	Lead lap under green flag
6	3	21	Buddy Baker	Ford	334	37	155	Lead lap under green flag
7	25	22	Bobby Allison	Buick	334	3	151	Lead lap under green flag
8	7	9	Bill Elliott	Ford	334	43	147	Lead lap under green flag
9	13	3	Ricky Rudd	Chevrolet	333	1	143	+1 lap
10	11	28	Cale Yarborough	Chevrolet	333	10	139	+1 lap

== Standings after the race ==
Pos	Driver	Points	Differential
1	Bobby Allison	4229	0
2	Darrell Waltrip	4162	-67
3	Bill Elliott	3849	-380
4	Richard Petty	3658	-571
5	Harry Gant	3574	-655
6 ▲	Terry Labonte	3513	-716
7 ▼	Neil Bonnett	3497	-732
8 ▲	Ricky Rudd	3381	-848
8	Dale Earnhardt	3381	-848
10 ▲	Tim Richmond	3176	-1053

Preceded by 1983 Holly Farms 400	NASCAR Winston Cup Series races 1983	Succeeded by 1983 Warner W. Hodgdon American 500

Preceded by 1983 Winston 500	Richard Petty's Career Wins; 1960–1984	Succeeded by 1984 Budweiser 500

Preceded by 1982	National 500 races 1983	Succeeded by 1984
