= 1983 Warner W. Hodgdon Carolina 500 =

Auto race held at North Carolina Motor Speedway in 1983

Race details
- Race 3 of 30 in the 1983 NASCAR Winston Cup Series season
- Layout of Rockingham Speedway
- Date: March 13, 1983
- Official name: Carolina 500
- Location: North Carolina Motor Speedway, Rockingham, North Carolina
- Course: Permanent racing facility
- Course length: 1.636 km (1.017 miles)
- Distance: 492 laps, 500 mi (804 km)
- Weather: Temperatures of 70 °F (21 °C); wind speeds of 11.8 miles per hour (19.0 km/h)
- Average speed: 113.055 miles per hour (181.944 km/h)
- Attendance: 37,000

Pole position
Driver	Ricky Rudd	Richard Childress Racing

Most laps led
Driver	Cale Yarborough	Ranier-Lundy Racing
- Laps: 161

Winner
No. 43	Richard Petty	Petty Enterprises

Television in the United States
- Network: ESPN
- Announcers: Bob Jenkins; Larry Nuber

The 1983 Warner W. Hodgdon Carolina 500 was a NASCAR Winston Cup Series race that was scheduled to be held on Sunday, March 6, 1983, at North Carolina Motor Speedway in Rockingham, North Carolina. The race started on its scheduled date but the overcast skies opened up with steady rain soon after 100 laps were completed, forcing the race to be stopped for the day. The race concluded one week later on March 13, a pleasant sunny day.

Several hard crashes during the race sidelined drivers; Joe Ruttman crashed his #98 Buick going into turn three, sending the windshield flying out of his car and over the outer wall. Geoff Bodine in Pontiac #50 had a fast car and led many laps, but crashed out while attempting to lap Cale Yarborough's #28 Chevy. With 42 laps to go Yarborough and Neil Bonnett in the #75 Chevy, who had been swapping the lead between them, tangled and crashed entering turn one when Bonnett ducked below Yarborough. Both cars spun and Yarborough slid back into the outside wall. The 28 car was heavily damaged in the rear and shortened by nearly five feet but limped home for a 9th-place finish, 6 laps down. Bonnett dropped out with damage from the wreck with 9 laps to go and finished 12th. Richard Petty barely held off a hard-charging Bill Elliott in a close side by side fight to the checkered flag.

== Race report ==
This 492-lap event lasted for four hours and twenty-five minutes; drivers at this event managed to average speeds up to 113.055 miles per hour (181.944 km/h). At the start of the race were 35 American-born drivers; Ernie Cline was the last-place finisher due to a crash on lap 2. Crashes and engine problems would take out more than a dozen drivers; with Neil Bonnett being the highest-finishing driver not to complete the race. Ruttman slammed the outside wall after spinning in oil. He spun backward and his left rear slammed the wall and Ruttman bounced off nearly getting airborne, almost flipping. His day would ultimately end on lap 176.

Richard Petty would end up beating Bill Elliott by half a car length in one of the closest finishes at the speedway. Petty would acquire his only win in a race televised by ESPN. This event was Richard Petty's 196th win in the NASCAR Winston Cup Series in addition to his 900th Winston Cup Series start. The event was marred by 1.1 inches (28 mm) of rainfall forcing the race to be postponed for a week.

The leaders for the first 100 laps of the race would be Ricky Rudd, Dale Earnhardt, Cale Yarborough, Neil Bonnett, and Dick Brooks while the leaders during the last 100 laps would be Neil Bonnett, Darrell Waltrip, Richard Petty, and Bill Elliott. With 15 laps to go, Neil Bonnett and Cale Yarborough crashed in Turn 1 while racing for the lead.

Ricky Rudd won the pole position with a speed of 143.413 miles per hour or 230.801 kilometres per hour. Out of Ricky Rudd's three poles to start 1983 this was the only one that netted him a good finish, he did not finish at Daytona or Richmond but brought the #3 Chevrolet home with a top-10 finish here. A crowd of 37,000 NASCAR fans attended. 94 of 492 laps were run under caution.

Joe Ruttman would lose his championship lead to Bill Elliott after this event.

Individual winnings for this event ranged from the winner's share of $24,150 ($76,242 when adjusted for inflation) to the last-place finisher's purse of $910 ($2,873 when adjusted for inflation). The total prize purse offered was $199,065 ($628,455 when adjusted for inflation).

=== Timeline ===
Section reference:

- Start: The race started with a green/yellow flag and Ricky Rudd having the pole position.
- Lap 39: First caution due to Dave Marcis' engine failure; ended on lap 48.
- Lap 73: Second caution due to Dale Earnhardt's accident; ended on lap 77.
- Lap 111: Third caution due to Buddy Baker spinning his tires; ended on lap 118.
- Lap 139: Fourth caution due to rain; ended on lap 149.
- Lap 179: Fifth caution due to a 3-car accident; ended on lap 190.
- Lap 271: Sixth caution due to debris; caution ended on lap 274.
- Lap 403: Seventh caution due to Geoffrey Bodine's accident; ended on lap 413.
- Lap 452: Eighth caution due to a 2-car accident; ended on lap 459.
- Lap 477: Ninth caution due to Tommy Gale's accident; ended on lap 479.
- Finish: Richard Petty was officially declared the winner of the race.

=== Top 10 finishers ===
Pos	Grid	No.	Driver	Manufacturer	Laps	Laps led	Points	Time/Status
1	12	43	Richard Petty	Pontiac	492	48	180	4:25:30
2	6	9	Bill Elliott	Ford	492	10	175	+0.5 car lengths
3	11	11	Darrell Waltrip	Chevrolet	492	3	170	Lead lap under green flag
4	17	1	Lake Speed	Chevrolet	489	0	160	+3 laps
5	7	33	Harry Gant	Buick	489	0	155	+3 laps
6	1	3	Ricky Rudd	Chevrolet	489	30	155	+3 laps
7	13	27	Tim Richmond	Pontiac	488	2	151	+4 laps
8	19	60	Dick Brooks	Ford	486	1	147	+6 laps
9	5	28	Cale Yarborough	Chevrolet	486	161	148	+6 laps
10	3	22	Bobby Allison	Chevrolet	484	21	139	+8 laps

== Standings after the race ==
Pos	Driver	Points	Differential
1 ▲	Bill Elliott	500	0
2 ▲	Bobby Allison	457	-43
3 ▲	Dick Brooks	431	-69
4 ▲	Neil Bonnett	404	-96
5 ▼	Joe Ruttman	402	-98
6 ▲	Richard Petty	376	-124
7 ▼	Buddy Baker	371	-129
8 ▲	Harry Gant	367	-133
9 ▲	Lake Speed	366	-134
10	Jimmy Means	357	-143

Preceded by 1983 Richmond 400	NASCAR Winston Cup Season; 1983	Succeeded by 1983 Coca-Cola 500
Preceded by 1981 Champion Spark Plug 400	Richard Petty's Career Wins; 1960-1984	Succeeded by 1983 Winston 500
