= NASCAR Cup Series at Nashville Fairgrounds Speedway =

NASCAR Winston Cup Series
- Venue: Nashville International Raceway
- Location: Nashville, Tennessee

Circuit information
- Surface: Asphalt
- Length: 0.959 km (0.596 mi)

Stock car races in the NASCAR Winston Cup Series were held at the Nashville International Raceway in Nashville, Tennessee from 1958 to 1984.

== July race ==
Pepsi 420
- Venue: Nashville International Raceway
- Location: Nashville, Tennessee
- Corporate sponsor: Pepsi
- First race: 1958
- Last race: 1984
- Distance: 250.32 miles (402.9 km)
- Laps: 420
- Previous names: Nashville 200 (1958); Nashville 300 (1959); Nashville 400 (1960, 1963–1969); Nashville 500 (1961–1962); Nashville 420 (1970–1978); Busch Nashville 420 (1979–1983); Pepsi 420 (1984)

The Pepsi 420 was a NASCAR Winston Cup Series stock car race held at Fairgrounds Speedway from 1958 to 1984.

=== Past winners ===
Year	Date	No.	Driver	Team	Manufacturer	Race Distance		Race Time	Average Speed (mph)	Report	Ref
Year	Date	No.	Driver	Team	Manufacturer	Laps	Miles (km)	Race Time	Average Speed (mph)	Report	Ref
1958	August 10	72	Joe Weatherly	Holman-Moody	Ford	200	100 (160.934)	1:41:14	59.269	Report	
1959	August 9	77	Joe Lee Johnson	Joe Lee Johnson	Chevrolet	300	150 (241.401)	2:22:05	63.343	Report	
1960	August 7	73	Johnny Beauchamp	Dale Swanson	Chevrolet	333*	166.5 (267.955)	2:55:22	56.966	Report	
1961	August 6	44	Jim Paschal	Julian Petty	Pontiac	403*	201.5 (324.282)	3:34:09	56.455	Report	
1962	August 5	42	Jim Paschal	Petty Enterprises	Plymouth	500	250 (402.336)	3:52:41	64.489	Report	
1963	August 4	42	Jim Paschal	Petty Enterprises	Plymouth	350*	175 (281.635)	2:54:38	60.126	Report	
1964	August 2	43	Richard Petty	Petty Enterprises	Plymouth	400	200 (321.868)	2:43:55	73.208	Report	
1965	July 31	43	Richard Petty	Petty Enterprises	Plymouth	400	200 (321.868)	2:45:47	72.383	Report	
1966	July 30	43	Richard Petty	Petty Enterprises	Plymouth	400	200 (321.868)	2:47:11	71.77	Report	
1967	July 29	43	Richard Petty	Petty Enterprises	Plymouth	400	200 (321.868)	2:49:20	70.866	Report	
1968	July 27	17	David Pearson	Holman-Moody	Ford	301*	150.5 (242.206)	2:03:44	72.98	Report	
1969	July 26	43	Richard Petty	Petty Enterprises	Ford	400	200 (321.868)	2:32:24	78.74	Report	
1970	July 25	71	Bobby Isaac	Nord Krauskopf	Dodge	420	250.32 (402.85)	2:50:47	87.943	Report	
1971	July 24	43	Richard Petty	Petty Enterprises	Plymouth	420	250.32 (402.85)	2:47:30	89.667	Report	
1972	August 27	12	Bobby Allison	Richard Howard	Chevrolet	420	250.32 (402.85)	2:42:14	92.578	Report	
1973	August 25	71	Buddy Baker	Nord Krauskopf	Dodge	420	250.32 (402.85)	2:48:12	89.31	Report	
1974	July 20	11	Cale Yarborough	Junior Johnson & Associates	Chevrolet	420	250.32 (402.85)	3:10:40	76.368	Report	
1975	July 20	11	Cale Yarborough	Junior Johnson & Associates	Chevrolet	420	250.32 (402.85)	2:47:16	89.792	Report	
1976	July 17	72	Benny Parsons	L.G. DeWitt	Chevrolet	420	250.32 (402.85)	2:52:49	86.908	Report	
1977	July 16	88	Darrell Waltrip	DiGard Motorsports	Chevrolet	420	250.32 (402.85)	3:10:09	78.999	Report	
1978	July 15	11	Cale Yarborough	Junior Johnson & Associates	Oldsmobile	420	250.32 (402.85)	2:48:54	88.924	Report	
1979	July 14	88	Darrell Waltrip	DiGard Motorsports	Chevrolet	420	250.32 (402.85)	2:42:51	92.227	Report	
1980	July 12	2	Dale Earnhardt	Rod Osterlund Racing	Chevrolet	420	250.32 (402.85)	2:40:05	93.821	Report	
1981	July 11	11	Darrell Waltrip	Junior Johnson & Associates	Buick	420	250.32 (402.85)	2:48:47	90.052	Report	
1982	July 10	11	Darrell Waltrip	Junior Johnson & Associates	Buick	420	250.32 (402.85)	2:53:35	86.524	Report	
1983	July 16	15	Dale Earnhardt	Bud Moore Engineering	Ford	420	250.32 (402.85)	2:55:12	85.726	Report	
1984	July 14	5	Geoffrey Bodine	All-Star Racing	Chevrolet	420	250.32 (402.85)	3:05:38	80.908	Report	

- 1960, 1961, & 1968: Race shortened due to rain.
- 1963: Race shortened due to impending darkness.

=== Multiple winners (drivers) ===
# Wins	Manufacturer	Years won
6	Richard Petty	1964, 1965, 1966, 1967, 1969, 1971
4	Darrell Waltrip	1975, 1979, 1981, 1982
3	Jim Paschal	1961, 1962, 1963
3	Cale Yarborough	1974, 1977, 1978
2	Dale Earnhardt	1980, 1983

=== Multiple winners (manufacturers) ===
# Wins	Manufacturer	Years won
10	Chevrolet	1959, 1960, 1972, 1974, 1975, 1976, 1977, 1979, 1980, 1984
7	Plymouth	1962, 1963, 1964, 1965, 1966, 1967, 1971
4	Ford	1958, 1968, 1969, 1983
2	Dodge	1970, 1973
2	Buick	1981, 1982

== May race ==
Coors 420
- Venue: Nashville International Raceway, Nashville, Tennessee
- Corporate sponsor: Coors
- First race: 1959
- Last race: 1984
- Distance: 250.32 miles (402.9 km)
- Laps: 420
- Previous names: Music City 200 (1959, 1964–1965); Music City USA 420 (1973–1978, 1980); Sun-Drop Music City USA 420 (1979); Melling Tool 420 (1981); Cracker Barrel Country Store 420 (1982); Marty Robbins 420 (1983); Coors 420 (1984)

The Coors 420 was a NASCAR Winston Cup Series stock car race held at Nashville International Raceway. It was held annually from 1959 to 1984.

=== Past winners ===
Year	Date	No.	Driver	Team	Manufacturer	Race Distance		Race Time	Average Speed (mph)	Report	Ref
Year	Date	No.	Driver	Team	Manufacturer	Laps	Miles (km)	Race Time	Average Speed (mph)	Report	Ref
1959	May 24	4	Rex White	Rex White	Chevrolet	200	100 (160.934)	1:24:30	71.006	Report	
1960 – 1963	Not held										
1964	June 14	43	Richard Petty	Petty Enterprises	Plymouth	200	100 (160.934)	1:18:26	76.498	Report	
1965	June 3	29	Dick Hutcherson	Holman-Moody	Ford	200	100 (160.934)	1:24:03	71.386	Report	
1966 – 1972	Not held										
1973	May 12	11	Cale Yarborough	Richard Howard	Chevrolet	420	250.32 (402.85)	2:34:48	98.419	Report	
1974	May 11	43	Richard Petty	Petty Enterprises	Dodge	400*	238.4 (383.667)	3:06:31	82.24	Report	
1975	May 10	17	Darrell Waltrip	Darrell Waltrip	Chevrolet	420	250.32 (402.85)	2:39:45	94.107	Report	
1976	May 8	11	Cale Yarborough	Junior Johnson & Associates	Chevrolet	420	250.32 (402.85)	2:57:43	84.512	Report	
1977	May 7	72	Benny Parsons	L. G. DeWitt	Chevrolet	420	250.32 (402.85)	2:51:40	87.49	Report	
1978	June 3	11	Cale Yarborough	Junior Johnson & Associates	Oldsmobile	420	250.32 (402.85)	2:51:34	87.541	Report	
1979	May 12	11	Cale Yarborough	Junior Johnson & Associates	Oldsmobile	420	250.32 (402.85)	2:49:25	88.652	Report	
1980	May 10	43	Richard Petty	Petty Enterprises	Chevrolet	420	250.32 (402.85)	2:47:52	89.471	Report	
1981	May 9	15	Benny Parsons	Bud Moore Engineering	Ford	420	250.32 (402.85)	2:47:02	89.756	Report	
1982	May 8	11	Darrell Waltrip	Junior Johnson & Associates	Buick	420	250.32 (402.85)	2:59:52	83.502	Report	
1983	May 7	11	Darrell Waltrip	Junior Johnson & Associates	Chevrolet	420	250.32 (402.85)	3:32:23	70.717	Report	
1984	May 12	11	Darrell Waltrip	Junior Johnson & Associates	Chevrolet	420	250.32 (402.85)	2:55:15	85.702	Report	

*1974: Race shortened due to energy crisis.

=== Multiple winners (drivers) ===
# Wins	Driver	Years won
4	Cale Yarborough	1973, 1976, 1978, 1979
4	Darrell Waltrip	1975, 1982, 1983, 1984
3	Richard Petty	1964, 1974, 1980
2	Benny Parsons	1977, 1981

=== Multiple winners (manufacturers) ===
# Wins	Manufacturer	Years won
8	Chevrolet	1959, 1973, 1975, 1976, 1977, 1980, 1983, 1984
2	Oldsmobile	1978, 1979
2	Ford	1965, 1981
