= Delma Cowart =

American racing driver (1941–2021)

Clinton “Delma” Cowart
- Born: July 6, 1941; Savannah, Georgia, U.S.
- Died: November 10, 2021 (aged 80); Savannah, Georgia, U.S.

NASCAR Cup Series career
- 21 races run over 11 years
- Best finish: 44th (1982)
- First race: 1981 Atlanta Journal 500 (Atlanta)
- Last race: 1992 DieHard 500 (Talladega)
Wins	Top tens	Poles
0	0	0

NASCAR O'Reilly Auto Parts Series career
- 1 race run over 1 year
- Best finish: 135th (1982)
- First race: 1982 Goody's 300 (Daytona)
Wins	Top tens	Poles
0	0	0

Clinton “Delma” Cowart (July 6, 1941 – November 10, 2021) was an American stock car racing driver. While never achieving much success, Cowart became known by fans and broadcasters as the "clown prince of racing" in the 1980s and 1990s. His jovial nature made him a favorite among competitors.

== Racing career ==
Cowart began competing in NASCAR in the Late Model Sportsman Division, now the NASCAR Xfinity Series. His notoriety in that series came in 1979 Permatex 300 at Daytona. On lap four, Joe Frasson had wrecked and was sitting in the middle of the race track. Cowart hit Frasson at nearly full speed igniting Frasson's fuel tank into a ball of fire. Neither Frasson or Cowart were injured in the crash although Don Williams was critically injured trying to avoid the accident. When changes to the structure of the late model series were made, Cowart decided that the rising expenses in that series would make it just as economically feasible to race in the Winston Cup Series.

Cowart made his first start in NASCAR by qualifying for the 1981 Atlanta Journal 500 with owner Heyward Grooms. That day he finished 18th. In 1982, Cowart earned his best career finish, in the Firecracker 400 at Daytona, scoring seventeenth.

A superspeedway driver, Cowart qualified for the Daytona 500 four times, each time throwing an extravagant party for members of the NASCAR community in celebration.

Cowart's primary career was installing pools and septic tanks in the Savannah, Georgia area. He used his day job to advance his racing, once trading Junior Johnson's engine builder a swimming pool for a racing engine.

=== Tracks ===
Cowart's main tracks were Daytona International Speedway or Talladega Superspeedway, but he did run in the 1992 race at Rockingham, North Carolina. Cowart also tried, but failed, to make the 1994 Brickyard 400.

=== Numbers ===
Cowart mainly ran the No. 0 during his time in the Cup Series, but he also ran the No. 49 at Daytona in 1987 (also a DNQ). Cowart repeatedly joked that he was the only driver whose car number matched his chance of winning. The inspiration for the number use was from Billy Preston's song, Nothing From Nothing. The song was a favorite of Cowart's.

Cowart also ran the No. 37 at Daytona in 1982 in what is now the O'Reilly Auto Parts Series.

=== 1992 Daytona 500 ===
Cowart made the 1992 Daytona 500 and made his trademark quote, "I ain't never won a race, though I ain't lost a party." An accident-filled qualifying race allowed Cowart to finish thirteenth and advance to the Daytona 500. "When we made the race," Cowart said, "I went out and hired a team physician. I figured we needed a team physician. I figured we needed one for all the physical requirements of our fine crew. What does the doctor specialize in? He's a veterinarian, because all we've got on our crew is a bunch of dogs!" A legendary party ensued at a Daytona area hotel. "I don't think he showed back up at the track until Sunday," Benny Parsons recalled.

The Daytona 500 that year was plagued by accidents, allowing Cowart to finish 25th, earning a career high $23,285. With the money, he bought a big screen TV and travelled to the following race at Rockingham, finishing 35th there.

=== Final years ===
Cowart tried to make the Daytona 500 from 1993 to 1997, but failed each time. His last race was the 1997 Winston Open, but he was flagged shortly after the start. Delma Cowart Racing brought two race cars to Charlotte Motor Speedway that weekend. One was for the ARCA race as the newer Penske Ford that Cowart had bought was for the Cup race. The Cup engine developed a problem so the team decided to make an engine change. The problems that followed were that the clutch components, some of the brackets, etc., were different from what Delma had as backup parts. Once the ARCA race had completed the team worked feverishly on the Cup car to make the race.

It was about 4:00 pm when the team started making the engine change as well as trying make all of the pieces fit together; by the time the car was ready it was roughly 6:00 pm. The green flag was to drop at 7:30 pm. The car had yet to pass inspection. A little after 6:00 pm, the team started the car and found that there was a transmission problem. The team now had a decision to make: to quit or keep on working. The team decided to go and make the transmission swap. Later on, the command to start engines went out. At that time, Cowart was still in the garage area and he started his. He left the garage area and entered the track only to see the black flag displayed. A few caution laps were made and then Cowart decided to pull off. At that time, the NASCAR officials were present in the garage area as Cowart and his crew chief had a meeting in the NASCAR trailer.

In later years, Cowart was featured in a Growing Bolder interview. When asked to as why he did what he did, he said, "Look, it wasn't a points race, just a money race, and the crew worked so hard, I wasn't about to let them down."

In early 1998, at age 56, Cowart announced his retirement at Whiskey Pete's, a saloon in Holly Hill, Florida. "I'm a dinosaur," Cowart said "There ain't no room for guys like me no more. To me, racing was a hobby. Now, you gotta have money."

== Personal life ==
Delma has a nephew Robbie Cowart who competes in Dirt Late Model competition and also competed in ARCA Menards Series competition from 1988 to 2004 across eighteen starts.

Cowart died on November 10, 2021, at the age of 80.

== Motorsports career results ==
=== NASCAR ===
(key) (Bold – Pole position awarded by qualifying time. Italics – Pole position earned by points standings or practice time. * – Most laps led.)

==== Winston Cup Series ====
NASCAR Winston Cup Series results
Year	Team	No.	Make	1	2	3	4	5	6	7	8	9	10	11	12	13	14	15	16	17	18	19	20	21	22	23	24	25	26	27	28	29	30	31	32	NWCC	Pts	Ref
1981	Heyward Grooms	0	Buick	RSD	DAY	RCH	CAR	ATL	BRI	NWS	DAR	MAR	TAL	NSV	DOV	CLT	TWS	RSD	MCH	DAY	NSV	POC	TAL	MCH	BRI	DAR	RCH	DOV	MAR	NWS	CLT	CAR	ATL; 18	RSD		NA	-	
1982	Heyward Grooms	0	Buick	DAY; 33	RCH	BRI									CLT; 32	POC	RSD	MCH																		44th	410	
1982	H. L. Waters Racing	0	Buick				ATL; 23	CAR	DAR	NWS	MAR	TAL	NSV	DOV					DAY; 17	NSV	POC	TAL; 30	MCH	BRI	DAR	RCH	DOV	NWS	CLT; DNQ	MAR	CAR	ATL	RSD			44th	410	
1983	H. L. Waters Racing	0	Buick	DAY; 31	RCH	CAR	ATL	DAR	NWS	MAR	TAL	NSV	DOV	BRI	CLT	RSD	POC	MCH	DAY; 35	NSV	POC	TAL	MCH	BRI	DAR	RCH	DOV	MAR	NWS			ATL; 24	RSD			49th	277	
1983	H. L. Waters Racing	0	Chevy																											CLT; 35	CAR					49th	277	
1984	H. L. Waters Racing	0	Chevy	DAY; DNQ	RCH	CAR																TAL; DNQ	MCH; DNQ	BRI	DAR	RCH	DOV	MAR	CLT	NWS	CAR	ATL	RSD			64th	152	
1984	H. L. Waters Racing	0	Buick				ATL; 36	BRI	NWS	DAR	MAR	TAL	NSV	DOV	CLT; 22	RSD	POC	MCH	DAY	NSV	POC															64th	152	
1985	H. L. Waters Racing	0	Chevy	DAY; 40	RCH	CAR	ATL; DNQ	BRI	DAR	NWS	MAR	TAL; DNQ	DOV	CLT; DNQ	RSD	POC	MCH	DAY; DNQ	POC	TAL; 37	MCH	BRI	DAR	RCH	DOV	MAR	NWS	CLT	CAR	ATL	RSD					80th	95	
1986	H. L. Waters Racing	0	Chevy	DAY; DNQ	RCH	CAR	ATL	BRI	DAR	NWS	MAR	TAL; 19	DOV	CLT; DNQ	RSD	POC	MCH	DAY	POC	TAL; 29	GLN	MCH	BRI	DAR	RCH	DOV	MAR	NWS	CLT; 39	CAR	ATL; DNQ	RSD				60th	-	
1987	H. L. Waters Racing	49	Chevy	DAY; DNQ	CAR	RCH	ATL	DAR	NWS	BRI	MAR	TAL	CLT	DOV	POC	RSD	MCH																			107th	-	
1987	H. L. Waters Racing	0	Chevy															DAY; DNQ	POC	TAL; 24	GLN	MCH	BRI	DAR	RCH	DOV	MAR	NWS	CLT; DNQ	CAR	RSD	ATL; DNQ				107th	-	
1988	H. L. Waters Racing	0	Chevy	DAY; DNQ	RCH	CAR	ATL	DAR	BRI	NWS	MAR	TAL	CLT	DOV	RSD	POC	MCH	DAY; DNQ	POC	TAL; DNQ	GLN	MCH	BRI	DAR	RCH	DOV	MAR	CLT	NWS	CAR	PHO	ATL				NA	-	
1989	H. L. Waters Racing	0	Chevy	DAY; DNQ	CAR	ATL	RCH	DAR	BRI	NWS	MAR	TAL; DNQ	CLT; DNQ	DOV	SON	POC	MCH	DAY; DNQ	POC	TAL	GLN	MCH	BRI	DAR	RCH	DOV	MAR	CLT	NWS	CAR	PHO	ATL				NA	-	
1990	H. L. Waters Racing	0	Ford	DAY; DNQ	RCH	CAR	ATL; DNQ	DAR	BRI	NWS	MAR	TAL	CLT; DNQ	DOV	SON	POC	MCH	DAY	POC	TAL; DNQ	GLN	MCH	BRI	DAR	RCH	DOV	MAR	NWS	CLT; DNQ	CAR; DNQ	PHO	ATL				NA	-	
1991	H. L. Waters Racing	0	Ford	DAY; DNQ	RCH	CAR	ATL	DAR	BRI	NWS	MAR	TAL	CLT	DOV	SON	POC	MCH	DAY; DNQ	POC	TAL; DNQ	GLN	MCH	BRI	DAR	RCH	DOV	MAR	NWS	CLT; DNQ	CAR	PHO	ATL; DNQ				NA	-	
1992	H. L. Waters Racing	0	Ford	DAY; 25	CAR; 35	RCH	ATL	DAR	BRI	NWS	MAR	TAL; DNQ	CLT; DNQ	DOV	SON	POC	MCH	DAY; DNQ	POC; DNQ	TAL; 37	GLN	MCH; DNQ	BRI	DAR	RCH	DOV	MAR	NWS	CLT	CAR	PHO	ATL				54th	198	
1993	H. L. Waters Racing	0	Ford	DAY; DNQ	CAR	RCH	ATL	DAR	BRI	NWS	MAR	TAL; DNQ	SON	CLT	DOV	POC	MCH	DAY; DNQ	NHA	POC	TAL	GLN	MCH	BRI	DAR	RCH	DOV	MAR	NWS	CLT	CAR	PHO	ATL			NA	-	
1994	H. L. Waters Racing	0	Ford	DAY; DNQ	CAR	RCH	ATL	DAR	BRI	NWS	MAR	TAL; DNQ	SON	CLT	DOV	POC	MCH	DAY; DNQ	NHA	POC	TAL; DNQ	IND; DNQ	GLN	MCH	BRI	DAR	RCH	DOV	MAR	NWS	CLT; DNQ	CAR	PHO	ATL		NA	-	
1995	H. L. Waters Racing	0	Ford	DAY; DNQ	CAR	RCH	ATL	DAR	BRI	NWS	MAR	TAL; DNQ	SON	CLT	DOV	POC	MCH	DAY; DNQ	NHA	POC	TAL; DNQ	IND	GLN	MCH	BRI	DAR	RCH	DOV	MAR	NWS	CLT; DNQ	CAR	PHO	ATL; DNQ		NA	-	
1996	H. L. Waters Racing	0	Ford	DAY; DNQ	CAR	RCH	ATL	DAR	BRI	NWS	MAR	TAL; DNQ	SON	CLT; DNQ	DOV	POC	MCH	DAY	NHA	POC	TAL	IND	GLN	MCH	BRI	DAR	RCH	DOV	MAR	NWS	CLT; DNQ	CAR	PHO	ATL		NA	-	
1997	H. L. Waters Racing	0	Ford	DAY; DNQ	CAR	RCH	ATL	DAR	TEX	BRI	MAR	SON	TAL	CLT	DOV	POC	MCH	CAL	DAY	NHA	POC	IND	GLN	MCH	BRI	DAR	RCH	NHA	DOV	MAR	CLT	TAL	CAR	PHO	ATL	NA	-	

===== Daytona 500 =====
Year	Team	Manufacturer	Start	Finish
1982	Heyward Grooms	Buick	37	33
1983	H. L. Waters Racing	Buick	38	31
1984	H. L. Waters Racing	Chevrolet	DNQ	
1985	H. L. Waters Racing	Chevrolet	30	40
1986	H. L. Waters Racing	Chevrolet	DNQ	
1987	H. L. Waters Racing	Chevrolet	DNQ	
1988	H. L. Waters Racing	Chevrolet	DNQ	
1989	H. L. Waters Racing	Chevrolet	DNQ	
1990	H. L. Waters Racing	Ford	DNQ	
1991	H. L. Waters Racing	Ford	DNQ	
1992	H. L. Waters Racing	Ford	27	25
1993	H. L. Waters Racing	Ford	DNQ	
1994	H. L. Waters Racing	Ford	DNQ	
1995	H. L. Waters Racing	Ford	DNQ	
1996	H. L. Waters Racing	Ford	DNQ	
1997	H. L. Waters Racing	Ford	DNQ	

==== Budweiser Late Model Sportsman Series ====
NASCAR Budweiser Late Model Sportsman Series results
Year	Team	No.	Make	1	2	3	4	5	6	7	8	9	10	11	12	13	14	15	16	17	18	19	20	21	22	23	24	25	26	27	28	29	NBLMSS	Pts	Ref
1982	Heyward Grooms	37	Chevy	DAY; 17	RCH	BRI	MAR	DAR	HCY	SBO	CRW	RCH	LGY	DOV	HCY	CLT	ASH	HCY	SBO	CAR	CRW	SBO	HCY	LGY	IRP	BRI	HCY	RCH	MAR	CLT	HCY	MAR	135th	112	

=== ARCA Bondo/Mar-Hyde Series ===
(key) (Bold – Pole position awarded by qualifying time. Italics – Pole position earned by points standings or practice time. * – Most laps led.)

ARCA Bondo/Mar-Hyde Series results
Year	Team	No.	Make	1	2	3	4	5	6	7	8	9	10	11	12	13	14	15	16	17	18	19	20	21	22	23	24	25	ABMHSC	Pts	Ref
1987		00	Chevy	DAY; 11	ATL	TAL	DEL	ACS	TOL	ROC	POC	FRS	KIL	TAL	FRS	ISF	INF	DSF	SLM	ATL									92nd	-	
1990	H. L. Waters Racing	0	Ford	DAY	ATL	KIL	TAL	FRS	POC	KIL	TOL	HAG	POC	TAL; 14	MCH	ISF	TOL	DSF	WIN	DEL	ATL								90th	-	
1991	H. L. Waters Racing	0	Ford	DAY	ATL	KIL	TAL	TOL	FRS	POC	MCH	KIL	FRS	DEL	POC	TAL; 10	HPT	MCH	ISF	TOL	DSF								72nd	-	
1991	H. L. Waters Racing	00	Ford																			TWS; 10	ATL						72nd	-	
1994	H. L. Waters Racing	0	Ford	DAY; DNQ	TAL	FIF	LVL	KIL	TOL	FRS	MCH	DMS	POC	POC	KIL	FRS	INF	I70	ISF	DSF	TOL	SLM	WIN	ATL					NA	-	
1995	H. L. Waters Racing	0	Ford	DAY; 16	ATL; 16	TAL; 14	FIF	KIL	FRS	MCH	I80	MCS	FRS	POC	POC	KIL	FRS	SBS	LVL	ISF	DSF	SLM	WIN	ATL; 16					41st	860	
1996	H. L. Waters Racing	0	Ford	DAY; 25	ATL	SLM	TAL; 27	FIF	LVL	CLT; 16	CLT; 11	KIL	FRS	POC	MCH	FRS	TOL	POC	MCH	INF	SBS	ISF	DSF	KIL	SLM	WIN	CLT; 20	ATL; 31	38th	-	
1997	H. L. Waters Racing	8	Ford	DAY	ATL	SLM	CLT	CLT	POC	MCH	SBS	TOL	KIL	FRS	MIN	POC	MCH	DSF	GTW	SLM	WIN	CLT	TAL; DNQ	ISF					NA	-	
1997	H. L. Waters Racing	0	Ford																						ATL; DNQ				NA	-	
