= Clark Dwyer =

American racing driver (born 1964)

- Born: January 12, 1964 (age 62); Littleton, Colorado, U.S.

NASCAR Cup Series career
- 59 races run over 4 years
- Best finish: 22nd (1985)
- First race: 1983 Daytona 500 (Daytona)
- Last race: 1985 Winston Western 500 (Riverside)
Wins	Top tens	Poles
0	1	0
- Statistics up to date as of October 30, 2024.

Clark Dwyer (born January 12, 1964) is an American former professional stock car racing driver who competed in the NASCAR Winston Cup Series from 1983 to 1986, where he achieved a best finish of tenth at Dover Motor Speedway in 1983.

Dwyer also competed in series such as the NASCAR Winston West Series, the ASA National Tour, and the ARTGO Challenge Series.

== Motorsports career results ==
=== NASCAR ===
(key) (Bold - Pole position awarded by qualifying time. Italics - Pole position earned by points standings or practice time. * – Most laps led.)

==== Winston Cup Series ====
NASCAR Winston Cup Series results
Year	Team	No.	Make	1	2	3	4	5	6	7	8	9	10	11	12	13	14	15	16	17	18	19	20	21	22	23	24	25	26	27	28	29	30	NWCC	Pts	Ref
1983	Hamby Motorsports	10	Chevy	DAY; 21	RCH	CAR	ATL	DAR	NWS; DNQ	MAR	TAL; 39	NSV	DOV	BRI	CLT	RSD	POC	MCH	DAY; 25	NSV	POC; 40	TAL	MCH; DNQ	BRI	DAR	RCH	DOV; 10	MAR	NWS	CLT	CAR	ATL	RSD	46th	411	
1984	Hamby Motorsports	17	Chevy	DAY; 20		CAR; 12		BRI; 18				TAL; 29		DOV; 22	CLT; 23			MCH; 39	DAY; 25	NSV; 24		TAL; 28												23rd	2374	
1984	Hamby Motorsports	17	Pontiac		RCH; 27		ATL; 40		NWS; 16	DAR; 15	MAR; 21		NSV; 25			RSD; 17	POC; 25				POC; 15										CAR; 38	ATL		23rd	2374	
1984	U.S. Racing	6	Chevy																				MCH; 40		DAR; 20	RCH; 26								23rd	2374	
1984	U.S. Racing	6	Buick																					BRI; 15										23rd	2374	
1984	Langley Racing	64	Ford																								DOV; 18	MAR	CLT	NWS				23rd	2374	
1984	Langley Racing	64	Pontiac																														RSD; 25	23rd	2374	
1985	Langley Racing	64	Ford	DAY; 18	RCH; 18	CAR; 37	ATL; 20	BRI; 14	DAR; 26	NWS; 18	MAR; 17	TAL; 23	DOV; 28	CLT; 23	RSD; 16	POC; 20	MCH; 25	DAY; 25	POC; 16	TAL; 20	MCH; 34	BRI; 18	DAR; 26	RCH; 24	DOV; 30	MAR; 19	NWS; 18	CLT; 16	CAR; 24	ATL; 40	RSD; 28			22nd	2641	
1986	Arrington Racing	76	Ford	DAY; DNQ	RCH	CAR	ATL	BRI	DAR	NWS	MAR	TAL	DOV	CLT; DNQ	RSD	POC	MCH	DAY	POC	TAL	GLN	MCH	BRI	DAR	RCH	DOV	MAR	NWS	CLT	CAR	ATL	RSD		N/A	0	

===== Daytona 500 =====
Year	Team	Manufacturer	Start	Finish
1983	Hamby Motorsports	Chevrolet	40	21
1984	Hamby Motorsports	Chevrolet	37	20
1985	Langley Racing	Ford	39	18
1986	Arrington Racing	Ford	DNQ	

==== Winston West Series ====
NASCAR Winston West Series results
Year	Team	No.	Make	1	2	3	4	5	6	7	8	9	10	11	12	13	Pos.	Pts	Ref
1982	Hamby Motorsports	1	Pontiac	MMR	S99	AAS	RSD	POR	WSP	SHA	EVG	SON	CDR	RSD	RSD	PHO; 11	N/A	40	
