= Terry Schoonover =

American stock car racing driver (1951–1984)

- Born: December 26, 1951
- Died: November 11, 1984 (aged 32); Hampton, Georgia, US
- Cause of death: Racing accident

NASCAR Cup Series career
- 2 races run over 1 year
- Best finish: 85th (1984)
- First race: 1984 Warner W. Hodgdon American 500 (Rockingham)
- Last race: 1984 Atlanta Journal 500 (Atlanta)
Wins	Top tens	Poles
0	0	0

Terrance Lynn Schoonover (December 26, 1951 – November 11, 1984) was an American stock car racing driver. A competitor in the NASCAR Winston Cup Series, he was killed in an accident in a race of 1984 at Atlanta International Raceway.

== Career ==
Schoonover began racing at the age of sixteen in drag racing and later moved to racing on dirt tracks in West Palm Beach, Florida.

After graduating from the Buck Baker Driving School, Schoonover served as a driving instructor at the school for a year. He would soon reach an agreement with Restore Auto Care Products to sponsor a limited NASCAR Winston Cup Series campaign in 1984 and a full-time campaign in 1985, driving a car he co-owned with his girlfriend Barbara Pike.

Schoonover made his Winston Cup debut at Rockingham Speedway in 1984, driving his own No. 42 Chevrolet home to a 21st place finish. The next race, at Atlanta International Raceway, on lap 129, Schoonover was involved in an accident where he hit the outside wall, then slid into the infield and struck a dirt embankment head on at a fairly high speed. The safety crew had to cut the roof of his car and roll it back in order to extricate him from the car, and he was eventually airlifted from the speedway to a local hospital where he died of massive head and internal injuries. His death was the first fatality at the Atlanta track.

== Motorsports career results ==
=== NASCAR ===
(key) (Bold – Pole position awarded by qualifying time. Italics – Pole position earned by points standings or practice time. * – Most laps led.)

==== Winston Cup Series ====
NASCAR Winston Cup Series results
Year	Team	No.	Make	1	2	3	4	5	6	7	8	9	10	11	12	13	14	15	16	17	18	19	20	21	22	23	24	25	26	27	28	29	30	NWCC	Pts
1984	Terry Schoonover	42	Chevy	DAY	RCH	CAR	ATL	BRI	NWS	DAR	MAR	TAL	NSV	DOV	CLT	RSD	POC	MCH	DAY	NSV	POC	TAL	MCH	BRI	DAR	RCH	DOV	MAR	CLT	NWS	CAR; 21	ATL; 34	RSD	85th	0

Preceded by Bruce Jacobi	NASCAR Sprint Cup Series fatal accidents 1984	Succeeded by Rick Baldwin
