= 1983 Like Cola 500 =

Auto race held at Pocono International Raceway in 1983

Coordinates: 41.05539°N 75.51152°W

Race details
- Race 18 of 30 in the 1983 NASCAR Winston Cup Series season
- 1983 Like Cola 500 program cover
- Date: July 24, 1983
- Official name: Like Cola 500
- Location: Pocono International Raceway, Long Pond, Pennsylvania
- Course: Permanent racing facility
- Course length: 2.500 miles (3.400 km)
- Distance: 200 laps, 501.0 mi (804 km)
- Weather: Mild with temperatures of 75.9 °F (24.4 °C); wind speeds of 8 miles per hour (13 km/h)
- Average speed: 114.818 mph (184.782 km/h)
- Attendance: 65,000

Pole position
Driver	Tim Richmond	Blue Max Racing
- Time: 59.218 seconds

Most laps led
Driver	Bobby Allison	DiGard Motorsports
- Laps: 56

Winner
No. 27	Tim Richmond	Blue Max Racing

Television in the United States
- Network: Mizlou
- Announcers: Ken Squier; Buddy Baker

The 1983 Like Cola 500, the 10th running of the event, was a NASCAR Winston Cup Series racing event held on July 24, 1983, at Pocono International Raceway in Long Pond, Pennsylvania.

Like Cola, the sponsor of the race, was an unsuccessful cola soft drink that was distributed and sold through the United States of America from 1982 to approximately 1985.

During the early 1980s, the NASCAR Winston Cup Series was plagued with top teams running big engines and finishing in third place to avoid inspection. Only manual transmission vehicles were allowed to participate in this race; a policy that NASCAR has retained to the present day.

The layout of Pocono Raceway, where the race was held.

== Background ==
Pocono Raceway is one of six superspeedways to hold NASCAR races; the others are Daytona International Speedway, Michigan International Speedway, Auto Club Speedway, Indianapolis Motor Speedway and Talladega Superspeedway. The standard track at Pocono Raceway is a three-turn superspeedway that is 2.5 miles (4.0 km) long. The track's turns are banked differently; the first is banked at 14°, the second turn at 8° and the final turn with 6°. However, each of the three straightaways are banked at 2°.

== Race report ==
Out of the 42 drivers who tried to qualify for this event; 40 managed to qualify. John Callis and Jimmy Walker are the two drivers who failed to qualify for the race. John Callis would never return to NASCAR after failing to qualify for this race. With the exception of Canadian-born Trevor Boys, the grid was born in the United States of America. Clark Dwyer managed to receive the last-place finish due to an oil pressure issue on lap 6 in this 200-lap extravaganza. Pontiac and Buick vehicles made up the majority of the racing grid. Bobby Wawak would be the lowest-finishing driver to complete the event while Morgan Shepherd's attempt at a "top ten" finish would be sabotaged by a problematic engine on lap 193.

While Tim Richmond and Darrell Waltrip would dominate the opening laps of this event, the closing laps would see Bill Elliott, Dave Marcis and Tim Richmond exchange the first-place position during the closing laps. Richmond would eventually best Waltrip by almost two seconds in front of a live audience of 65,000 spectators driving in a used Pontiac LeMans machine as opposed to the newer Pontiac Grand Prix model. Other notable drivers in this event included Kyle Petty, J.D. McDuffie, Sterling Marlin, Benny Parsons and Buddy Arrington. Bobby Gerhart and Glenn Jarrett managed to collide into each other in a manner that would rip the entire rear end off of Gerhart's vehicle on lap 25.

The average speeds for this vehicles in this event was 114.818 miles per hour (184.782 km/h) while pole position winner Tim Richmond was practically sailing through the turns at speeds up to 151.981 miles per hour (244.590 km/h) during the solo qualifying runs. Individual race earnings varied from the winner's portion of $27,430 ($88,669 when adjusted for inflation) to the last-place finisher's portion of $1,100 ($3,556 when adjusted for inflation). NASCAR officials authorized a grand total of $246,500 to be awarded to all qualifying drivers for this racing event ($796,822 when adjusted for inflation). After this event, the racing never got super-competitive at Pocono Raceway until the July 1995 running of the Miller Genuine Draft 500.

Glenn Jarrett would retire from NASCAR Cup Series racing after racing here. Notable crew chiefs who were in attendance for this race were Darrell Bryant, Joey Arrington, Elmo Langley, Dale Inman, Robin Pemberton, Bud Moore and Kirk Shelmerdine.

The most dominant drivers in the NASCAR Winston Cup Series during the 1980s were Bill Elliott, Darrell Waltrip, Terry Labonte, Bobby Allison, and Dale Earnhardt. During the early 1980s, the NASCAR Winston Cup Series was plagued with top teams running big engines and finishing in third place to avoid inspection.

=== Qualifying ===
Grid	No.	Driver	Manufacturer	Speed	Qualifying time	Owner
1	27	Tim Richmond	Pontiac	151.981	59.218	Raymond Beadle
2	33	Harry Gant	Buick	150.809	59.678	Hal Needham
3	11	Darrell Waltrip	Chevrolet	150.499	59.801	Junior Johnson
4	75	Neil Bonnett	Chevrolet	150.471	59.812	RahMoc Enterprises
5	44	Terry Labonte	Chevrolet	150.461	59.816	Billy Hagan
6	3	Ricky Rudd	Chevrolet	149.778	1:00.089	Richard Childress
7	55	Benny Parsons	Chevrolet	149.358	1:00.258	Johnny Hayes
8	9	Bill Elliott	Ford	149.293	1:00.284	Harry Melling
9	43	Richard Petty	Pontiac	148.984	1:00.409	Petty Enterprises
10	15	Dale Earnhardt	Ford	148.733	1:00.511	Bud Moore
11	88	Geoff Bodine	Pontiac	148.692	1:00.528	
12	22	Bobby Allison	Buick	148.588	1:00.570	
13	98	Joe Ruttman	Buick	148.446	1:00.628	
14	7	Kyle Petty	Pontiac	148.432	1:00.634	
15	47	Ron Bouchard	Buick	147.614	1:00.970	
16	90	Dick Brooks	Ford	147.196	1:01.143	
17	48	Trevor Boys	Chevrolet	147.150	1:01.162	
18	2	Morgan Shepherd	Buick	147.020	1:01.216	
19	71	Dave Marcis	Chevrolet	146.000	1:01.644	
20	17	Sterling Marlin	Pontiac	145.337	1:01.925	
21	5	Greg Sacks	Chevrolet	147.481	1:01.025	
22	8	Bobby Hillin, Jr.	Buick	144.550	1:02.262	
23	67	Buddy Arrington	Dodge	144.316	1:02.363	
24	64	Tommy Gale	Ford	143.938	1:02.527	
25	74	Bobby Wawak	Buick	143.816	1:02.580	
26	19	Bobby Gerhart	Buick	143.239	1:02.832	
27	02	D.K. Ulrich	Pontiac	143.087	1:02.899	
28	52	Jimmy Means	Pontiac	142.939	1:02.964	
29	18	Slick Johnson	Buick	142.898	1:02.982	
30	6	Al Elmore	Buick	142.360	1:03.220	
31	76	Mike Potter	Oldsmobile	142.333	1:03.232	
32	60	Bob Riley	Pontiac	142.310	1:03.242	
33	41	Ronnie Thomas	Pontiac	142.265	1:03.262	
34	10	Clark Dwyer	Chevrolet	142.135	1:03.320	
35	65	Glenn Jarrett	Ford	141.936	1:03.409	
36	24	Cecil Gordon	Chrysler	141.168	1:03.754	
37	58	Jerry Bowman	Ford	141.015	1:03.823	
38	63	Jocko Maggiacomo	Oldsmobile	140.988	1:03.835	
39	70	J.D. McDuffie	Pontiac	140.974	1:03.923	
40	13	Dick May	Buick	139.392	1:04.566	

== Race ==
Fin	St	#	Driver	Sponsor	Make	Team/Owner	Laps	Led	Status	Pts	Winnings
1	1	27	Tim Richmond	Old Milwaukee	Pontiac	Blue Max Racing	200	39	running	180	$27,430
2	3	11	Darrell Waltrip	Pepsi Challenger	Chevrolet	Junior Johnson & Associates	200	50	running	175	$23,375
3	12	22	Bobby Allison	Miller High Life	Buick	DiGard Motorsports	200	56	running	175	$21,950
4	4	75	Neil Bonnett	Hodgdon	Chevrolet	RahMoc Enterprises	200	25	running	165	$16,525
5	2	33	Harry Gant	Skoal Bandit	Buick	Mach 1 Racing	200	15	running	160	$14,700
6	8	9	Bill Elliott	Melling Oil Pumps	Ford	Melling Racing	200	2	running	155	$9,630
7	6	3	Ricky Rudd	Piedmont Airlines	Chevrolet	Richard Childress Racing	200	0	running	146	$7,460
8	19	71	Dave Marcis	Fun Seasons	Chevrolet	Marcis Auto Racing	200	3	running	147	$11,500
9	13	98	Joe Ruttman	Levi Garrett	Buick	Benfield Racing	200	0	running	138	$6,350
10	9	43	Richard Petty	STP	Pontiac	Petty Enterprises	200	5	running	139	$9,750
11	14	7	Kyle Petty	7-Eleven	Pontiac	Petty Enterprises	199	0	running	130	$5,880
12	5	44	Terry Labonte	Budweiser	Chevrolet	Hagan Racing	199	2	running	132	$6,370
13	15	47	Ron Bouchard	Race Hill Farm	Buick	Race Hill Farm Team	198	0	running	124	$5,260
14	17	48	Trevor Boys	Hylton-McCaig	Chevrolet	James Hylton Motorsports	197	0	running	121	$5,450
15	16	90	Dick Brooks	Chameleon Sunglasses	Ford	Donlavey Racing	196	0	running	118	$4,740
16	22	8	Bobby Hillin, Jr.	Trap Rock, Camper Stores	Buick	Hillin Racing	196	0	running	115	$2,500
17	27	02	D.K. Ulrich	Reeder Racing	Pontiac	Reeder Racing	195	0	running	112	$4,380
18	20	17	Sterling Marlin	Hesco Exhaust	Pontiac	Hamby Racing	195	0	running	109	$3,990
19	18	2	Morgan Shepherd	ACM Equipment Sales	Buick	Jim Stacy Racing	193	0	engine	106	$9,800
20	33	41	Ronnie Thomas	Yopaka Kennels	Pontiac	Ronnie Thomas	193	1	running	108	$2,100
21	31	76	Mike Potter	Cam Farm	Oldsmobile	Mike Potter	192	0	running	100	$2,000
22	30	6	Al Elmore	Ulrich Racing	Buick	Ulrich Racing	191	0	running	97	$3,580
23	36	24	Cecil Gordon	Boat Exchange	Chrysler	Gordon Racing	189	0	running	94	$1,850
24	24	64	Tommy Gale	Sunny King Ford & Honda	Ford	Elmo Langley	188	0	running	91	$3,470
25	39	70	J.D. McDuffie	McDuffie Racing	Pontiac	McDuffie Racing	183	0	running	88	$4,410
26	38	63	Jocko Maggiacomo	Tele-Video	Oldsmobile	Linro Motorsports	182	0	running	85	$1,700
27	25	74	Bobby Wawak	Superior Piping	Buick	Wawak Racing	175	0	running	82	$1,650
28	37	58	Jerry Bowman	Bel Air Datsun	Ford	Jerry Bowman	152	0	oil pressure	79	$1,600
29	21	5	Greg Sacks	Sacks & Sons	Chevrolet	Sacks & Sons	128	0	crash	76	$2,050
30	10	15	Dale Earnhardt	Wrangler	Ford	Bud Moore Engineering	71	0	engine	73	$8,500
31	7	55	Benny Parsons	Copenhagen	Chevrolet	Johnny Hayes Racing	71	2	engine	75	$1,450
32	23	67	Buddy Arrington	Arrington Racing	Dodge	Arrington Racing	62	0	crank	67	$2,400
33	40	13	Dick May	Halverson Racing	Buick	Halverson Racing	34	0	rear end	64	$1,350
34	26	19	Bobby Gerhart	Gray Racing	Buick	Gray Racing	25	0	crash	61	$1,300
35	28	52	Jimmy Means	Broadway Motors	Pontiac	Jimmy Means Racing	25	0	crash	58	$2,250
36	35	65	Glenn Jarrett	Spohn's Body Shop	Ford	Spohn Racing	24	0	crash	55	$1,200
37	29	18	Slick Johnson	Satterfield Racing	Buick	Satterfield Racing	21	0	engine	52	$1,175
38	32	60	Bob Riley	Riley Racing	Pontiac	Riley Racing	10	0	engine	49	$1,150
39	11	88	Geoffrey Bodine	Gatorade	Pontiac	Cliff Stewart Racing	7	0	engine	46	$3,125
40	34	10	Clark Dwyer	Kings Inn	Chevrolet	Roger Hamby	6	0	oil pressure	43	$1,100
Failed to qualify
		56	John Callis		Chevrolet	John Callis					
		96	Jimmy Walker		Ford	Will Cronkrite					

== Standings after the race ==
Pos	Driver	Points	Differential
1	Bobby Allison	2804	0
2	Darrell Waltrip	2602	-202
3	Bill Elliott	2535	-269
4	Harry Gant	2523	-281
5	Richard Petty	2439	-365
6	Neil Bonnett	2425	-379
7	Terry Labonte	2221	-583
8	Joe Ruttman	2208	-596
9 ▲	Ricky Rudd	2188	-616
10 ▼	Dale Earnhardt	2124	-680

Preceded by 1983 Busch Nashville 420	NASCAR Winston Cup Series Season; 1983	Succeeded by 1983 Talladega 500
