= 1984 NASCAR Winston Cup Series =

American motorsport season

Seasons
- ← 1983 1985 →

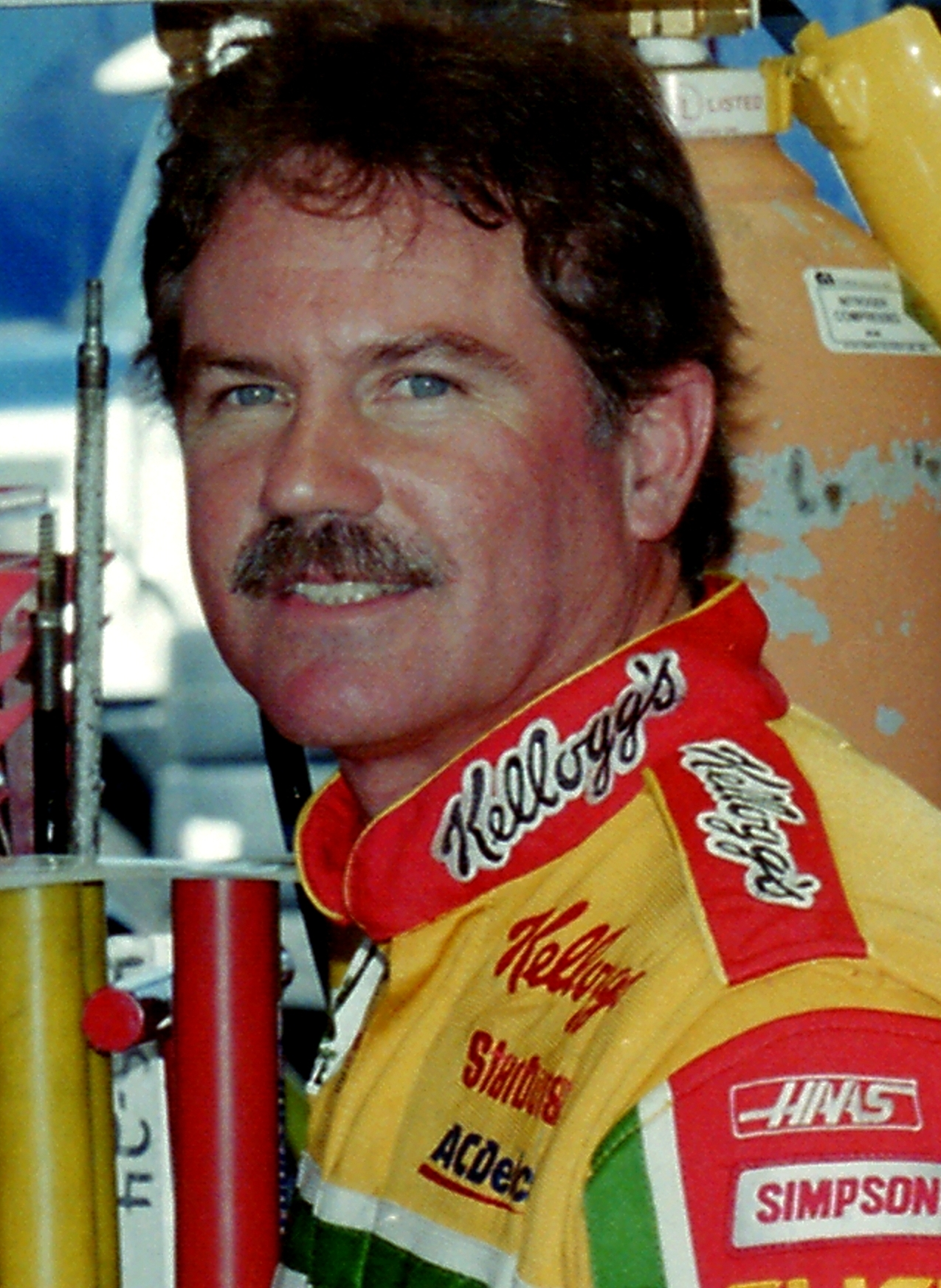
Terry Labonte won his first Winston Cup

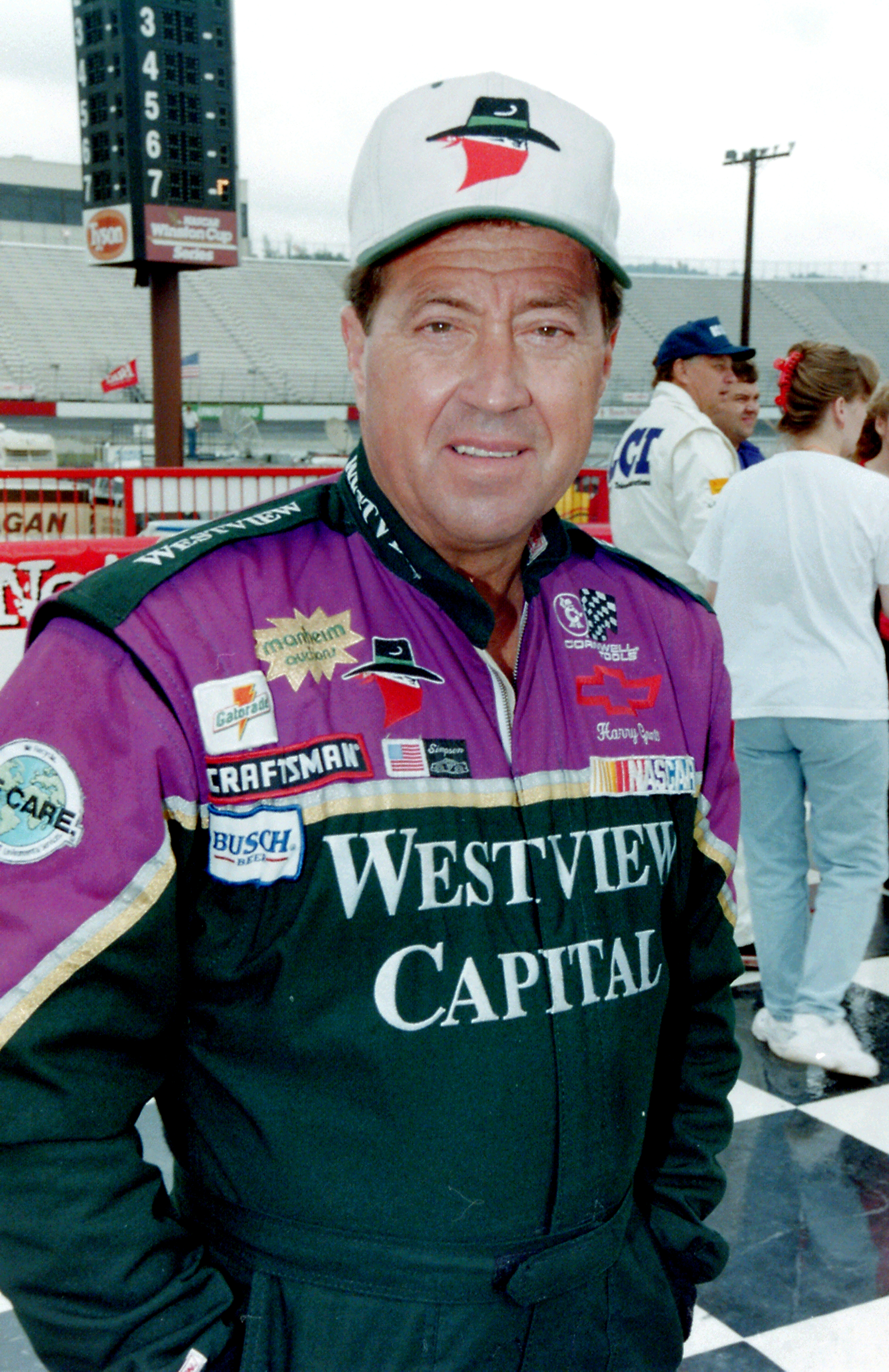
Harry Gant finished in second place

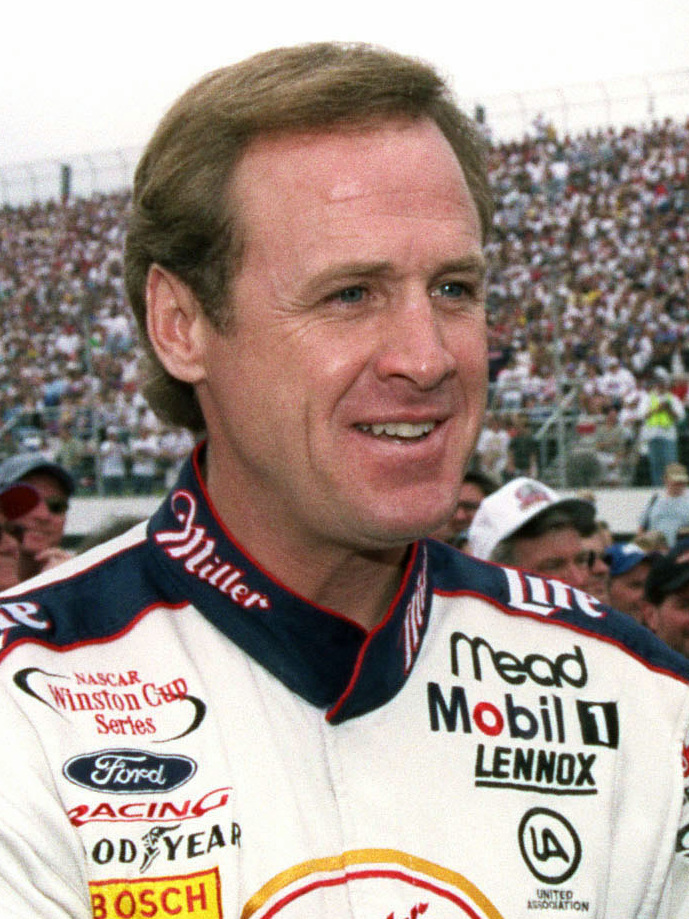
Rusty Wallace won Rookie of the Year

The 1984 NASCAR Winston Cup Series was the 36th season of professional stock car racing in the United States and the 13th modern-era Cup series season. It began on Sunday, February 19 and ended on Sunday, November 18. Terry Labonte was crowned champion at the end of the season. This was the final year for Chrysler until Dodge returned in 2001.

== Teams and drivers ==
=== Complete schedule ===
Manufacturer	Team	No.	Race Driver	Crew Chief
Buick	Race Hill Farm Team	47	Ron Bouchard	Jack Beebe
Chevrolet	All-Star Racing	5	Geoff Bodine	Harry Hyde
Chevrolet	Benfield Racing	98	Joe Ruttman 25	Kenny Wallace
Chevrolet	Benfield Racing	98	L. D. Ottinger 2	Kenny Wallace
Chevrolet	Benfield Racing	98	Morgan Shepherd 3	Kenny Wallace
Chevrolet	Hagan Racing	44	Terry Labonte	Dale Inman
Chevrolet	Hylton Motorsports	48	Trevor Boys	Steve Terry
Chevrolet	Junior Johnson & Associates	11	Darrell Waltrip	Jeff Hammond
Chevrolet	Junior Johnson & Associates	12	Neil Bonnett	Doug Richert
Chevrolet	Mach 1 Racing	33	Harry Gant	Travis Carter
Chevrolet	Richard Childress Racing	3	Dale Earnhardt	Kirk Shelmerdine
Ford	Bud Moore Engineering	15	Ricky Rudd	Bud Moore
Ford	Donlavey Racing	90	Dick Brooks	Junie Donlavey
Ford	Melling Racing	9	Bill Elliott	Ernie Elliott
Ford	Petty Enterprises	7	Kyle Petty	Mike Beam
Pontiac	Blue Max Racing	27	Tim Richmond	Tim Brewer
Pontiac	Cliff Stewart Racing	88	Rusty Wallace (R)	Darrell Bryant
Pontiac	Curb Racing	43	Richard Petty	Buddy Parrott
Chevrolet 3 Buick 27	DiGard Motorsports	22	Bobby Allison	Gary Nelson
Ford 29 Pontiac 1	Langley Racing	64	Tommy Gale 17	
Ford 29 Pontiac 1	Langley Racing	64	Jimmy Hensley 4	
Ford 29 Pontiac 1	Langley Racing	64	Gary Mayeda 1	
Ford 29 Pontiac 1	Langley Racing	64	Ken Schrader 5	
Ford 29 Pontiac 1	Langley Racing	64	Clark Dwyer (R) 2	
Ford 29 Pontiac 1	Langley Racing	64	Joe Millikan 1	
Pontiac 29 Chevrolet 1	RahMoc Enterprises	75	Dave Marcis	Butch Mock

=== Limited schedule ===
Manufacturer	Team	No.	Race Driver	Crew Chief	Round(s)
Chevrolet	Bobby Hawkins Racing	16	David Pearson	Ricky Pearson	11
Chevrolet	Branch-Ragan Racing	77	Ken Ragan	Marvin Ragan	10
Chevrolet	Ellington Racing	1	Lake Speed	Runt Pittman	17
Chevrolet	Hamby Racing	10	Sterling Marlin		1
Chevrolet	Heveron Racing	01	Doug Heveron (R)		16
Chevrolet	Johnny Hayes Racing	55	Benny Parsons	Cliff Champion	14
Chevrolet	Johnny Hayes Racing	66	Phil Parsons	Larry Pollard	23
Chevrolet	Morgan-McClure Motorsports	4	Lennie Pond	Tony Glover	4
Chevrolet	Morgan-McClure Motorsports	4	Tommy Ellis (R)	Tony Glover	20
Chevrolet	Morgan-McClure Motorsports	4	Joe Ruttman	Tony Glover	3
Chevrolet	Ranier-Lundy Racing	28	Cale Yarborough	Waddell Wilson	16
Chevrolet	Robert McEntyre Racing	84	Jody Ridley		14
Chevrolet	Sacks & Sons	51	Greg Sacks		29
Chevrolet	Thomas Racing	41	Ronnie Thomas		27
Chevrolet	Thomas Racing	41	Buddy Arrington		1
Ford	Wood Brothers Racing	21	Buddy Baker	Len Wood	21
Ford	Wood Brothers Racing	21	Bobby Rahal	Len Wood	1
Oldsmobile	Marcis Auto Racing	71	Mike Alexander		19
Oldsmobile	Marcis Auto Racing	71	Lennie Pond		7
Pontiac	McDuffie Racing	70	J. D. McDuffie		23
Chevrolet 12 Buick 5	Stavola Brothers Racing	8	Bobby Hillin Jr.	Jake Elder	17
Chevrolet 14 Buick 11	Ulrich Racing	6	Jim Sauter		4
Chevrolet 14 Buick 11	Ulrich Racing	6	D. K. Ulrich		9
Chevrolet 14 Buick 11	Ulrich Racing	6	Connie Saylor		1
Chevrolet 14 Buick 11	Ulrich Racing	6	Morgan Shepherd		2
Chevrolet 14 Buick 11	Ulrich Racing	6	Jimmy Ingalls		3
Chevrolet 14 Buick 11	Ulrich Racing	6	Clark Dwyer (R)		4
Chevrolet 15 Pontiac 13	Hamby Racing	17	Clark Dwyer (R)		20
Chevrolet 15 Pontiac 13	Hamby Racing	17	Morgan Shepherd		6
Chevrolet 15 Pontiac 13	Hamby Racing	17	Lake Speed		2
Chevrolet 9 Pontiac 20	Jimmy Means Racing	52	Jimmy Means		22
Chevrolet 9 Pontiac 20	Jimmy Means Racing	52	Roy Smith		1
Chevrolet 9 Pontiac 20	Jimmy Means Racing	52	Bobby Wawak		1
Chevrolet 9 Pontiac 20	Jimmy Means Racing	52	Slick Johnson		1
Chevrolet 9 Pontiac 20	Jimmy Means Racing	52	Dale Jarrett		1
Chevrolet 9 Pontiac 20	Jimmy Means Racing	52	Sterling Marlin		1
Chevrolet 9 Pontiac 20	Jimmy Means Racing	52	Morgan Shepherd		1
Chevrolet 1 Pontiac 1 Buick 4	Wawak Racing	74	Bobby Wawak		5
Chevrolet 1 Pontiac 1 Buick 4	Wawak Racing	74	Bob Riley		1
Chevrolet 10 Oldsmobile 1	Sadler Brothers Racing	95	Sterling Marlin		11
Chrysler 17 Dodge 12	Arrington Racing	67	Buddy Arrington	Joey Arrington	29
Oldsmobile 7 Chevrolet 6	Irv Sanderson Racing	97	Dean Combs (R)		13

== Schedule ==
No.	Race title	Track	Date
NC	Busch Clash	Daytona International Speedway, Daytona Beach	February 12
NC	UNO Twin 125 Qualifiers	Daytona International Speedway, Daytona Beach	February 16
NC	Daytona 500 Consolation Race	Daytona International Speedway, Daytona Beach	February 17
1	**Daytona 500**	Daytona International Speedway, Daytona Beach	February 19
2	Richmond 400	Richmond Fairgrounds Raceway, Richmond	February 26
3	Carolina 500	North Carolina Motor Speedway, Rockingham	March 4
4	Coca-Cola 500	Atlanta International Raceway, Hampton	March 18
5	Valleydale 500	Bristol International Raceway, Bristol	April 1
6	Northwestern Bank 400	North Wilkesboro Speedway, North Wilkesboro	April 8
7	TranSouth 500	Darlington Raceway, Darlington	April 15
8	Sovran Bank 500	Martinsville Speedway, Ridgeway	April 29
9	**Winston 500**	Alabama International Motor Speedway, Talladega	May 6
10	Coors 420	Nashville Speedway, Nashville	May 12
11	Budweiser 500	Dover Downs International Speedway, Dover	May 20
12	**World 600**	Charlotte Motor Speedway, Concord	May 27
13	Budweiser 400	Riverside International Raceway, Riverside	June 3
14	Van Scoy Diamond Mine 500	Pocono International Raceway, Long Pond	June 10
15	Miller High Life 400	Michigan International Speedway, Brooklyn	June 17
16	Firecracker 400	Daytona International Speedway, Daytona Beach	July 4
17	Pepsi 420	Nashville Speedway, Nashville	July 14
18	Like Cola 500	Pocono International Raceway, Long Pond	July 22
19	Talladega 500	Alabama International Motor Speedway, Talladega	July 29
20	Champion Spark Plug 400	Michigan International Speedway, Brooklyn	August 12
21	Busch 500	Bristol International Raceway, Bristol	August 25
22	**Southern 500**	Darlington Raceway, Darlington	September 2
23	Wrangler Sanfor-Set 400	Richmond Fairgrounds Raceway, Richmond	September 9
24	Delaware 500	Dover Downs International Speedway, Dover	September 16
25	Goody's 500	Martinsville Speedway, Ridgeway	September 23
26	Miller High Life 500	Charlotte Motor Speedway, Concord	October 7
27	Holly Farms 400	North Wilkesboro Speedway, North Wilkesboro	October 14
28	Warner W. Hodgdon American 500	North Carolina Motor Speedway, Rockingham	October 21
29	Atlanta Journal 500	Atlanta International Raceway, Hampton	November 11^{1}
30	Winston Western 500	Riverside International Raceway, Riverside	November 18

1. Originally scheduled for November 4, but postponed due to rain.

Bold denotes NASCAR Crown Jewel event

== Races ==
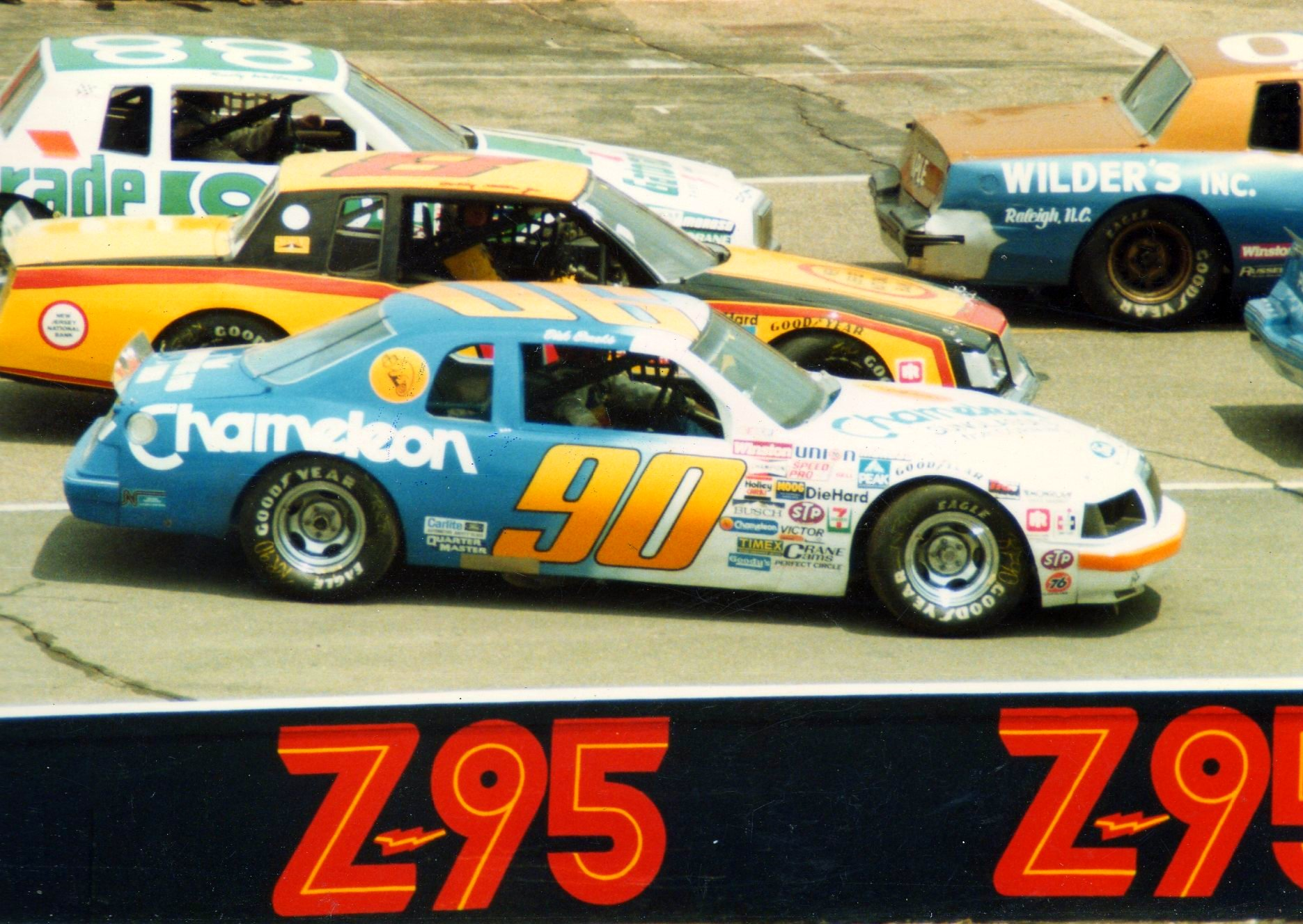
Several cars at Pocono, including #90 Dick Brooks

=== Daytona 500 ===
The 26th running of the Daytona 500 was run on February 19 at Daytona International Speedway. Cale Yarborough completed a lap of 201.848 mph (324.828 km/h) to win the pole, officially breaking the 200 mph barrier at Daytona. He drafted past Darrell Waltrip on the final lap, winning for the second year in a row, and fourth time in his career.

Top ten results:

1. #28 - Cale Yarborough
2. #3 - Dale Earnhardt
3. #11 - Darrell Waltrip
4. #12 - Neil Bonnett
5. #9 - Bill Elliott
6. #33 - Harry Gant
7. #15 - Ricky Rudd
8. #5 - Geoff Bodine
9. #16 - David Pearson
10. #84 - Jody Ridley
- Richard Petty, making his debut with Curb Racing, stormed from 34th to lead over 20 laps before a camshaft broke.

=== Richmond 400 ===
The Richmond 400 was held on February 26 at Richmond Fairgrounds Speedway. Darrell Waltrip won the pole.

Top ten results:

1. #15 - Ricky Rudd*
2. #11 - Darrell Waltrip
3. #44 - Terry Labonte
4. #9 - Bill Elliott
5. #12 - Neil Bonnett
6. #3 - Dale Earnhardt
7. #27 - Tim Richmond
8. #33 - Harry Gant
9. #5 - Geoff Bodine
10. #98 - Joe Ruttman
- Rudd's victory came while still dealing with swelling in his face from his accident in the Busch Clash.

=== Carolina 500 ===
The Carolina 500 was held on March 4 at North Carolina Motor Speedway. Harry Gant won the pole.

Top ten results:

1. #22 - Bobby Allison
2. #44 - Terry Labonte
3. #1 - Lake Speed
4. #43 - Richard Petty
5. #21 - Buddy Baker
6. #5 - Geoff Bodine
7. #9 - Bill Elliott
8. #75 - Dave Marcis
9. #11 - Darrell Waltrip
- A four-car crash on Lap 372 damaged the guardrail, resulting in a 30-minute delay to repair it.
- Before the race, controversy erupted between the track and sponsor Warner Hodgdon over late payment of sponsorship fees. The fees were paid in full March 19.

=== Atlanta 500 ===
The Atlanta 500 was held on March 18 at Atlanta International Speedway. Buddy Baker won the pole. Benny Parsons fought off Dale Earnhardt and Cale Yarborough in a three-car race.

Top ten results:

1. #55 - Benny Parsons*
2. #3 - Dale Earnhardt
3. #28 - Cale Yarborough
4. #43 - Richard Petty
5. #22 - Bobby Allison
6. #33 - Harry Gant
7. #44 - Terry Labonte
8. #15 - Ricky Rudd
9. #1 - Lake Speed
10. #11 - Darrell Waltrip*
- This was Parsons' final career Winston Cup Series victory.
- Darrell Waltrip was dropped from 5th to 10th after the race when NASCAR ruled that he made an illegal pass to get a lap back late in the race.

=== Valleydale 500 ===
The Vallydale 500 was held on April 1 at Bristol International Raceway. Ricky Rudd won the pole. Darrell Waltrip passed Tim Richmond with 44 laps to go for the victory.

Top ten results:

1. #11 - Darrell Waltrip*
2. #44 - Terry Labonte
3. #47 - Ron Bouchard
4. #75 - Dave Marcis
5. #27 - Tim Richmond
6. #15 - Ricky Rudd
7. #3 - Dale Earnhardt
8. #43 - Richard Petty
9. #9 - Bill Elliott
10. #98 - Joe Ruttman
- This was Waltrip's seventh consecutive Bristol victory.
- Bobby Allison, who led 190 laps to Waltrip's 205, faltered with 57 laps to go and finished 19th.
- Dale Jarrett made his Winston Cup debut in this race, driving the #02 Chevrolet for Emanuel Zervakis. Jarrett started 24th and finished 14th.

=== Northwestern Bank 400 ===
The Northwestern Bank 400 was held on April 8 at North Wilkesboro Speedway. Ricky Rudd won the pole. Rudd led 290 laps but faltered in the final 28 laps, handing Tim Richmond the victory, what would be his last driving for Raymond Beadle.

Top ten results:

1. #27 - Tim Richmond
2. #33 - Harry Gant
3. #15 - Ricky Rudd
4. #44 - Terry Labonte
5. #7 - Kyle Petty
6. #11 - Darrell Waltrip
7. #47 - Ron Bouchard
8. #3 - Dale Earnhardt
9. #12 - Neil Bonnett
10. #9 - Bill Elliott

=== TranSouth 500 ===
The TranSouth 500 was held on April 8 at Darlington Raceway. Benny Parsons won the pole.

Top ten results:

1. #11 - Darrell Waltrip*
2. #44 - Terry Labonte
3. #9 - Bill Elliott
4. #28 - Cale Yarborough
5. #3 - Dale Earnhardt
6. #33 - Harry Gant
7. #43 - Richard Petty
8. #66 - Phil Parsons
9. #15 - Ricky Rudd
10. #12 - Neil Bonnett
- This was Waltrip's fourth Spring Darlington victory.
- This race was permeated by two thunderstorms and multiple crashes, including two multi-car wrecks.

=== Sovran Bank 500 ===
The Sovran Bank 500 was held on April 29 at Martinsville Speedway. Joe Ruttman won the pole. Ricky Rudd led 121 laps and Bobby Allison led 266 laps, but both were knocked out of contention in the final 60 laps, allowing Geoff Bodine to score the victory.

Top ten results:

1. #5 - Geoff Bodine*
2. #47 - Ron Bouchard
3. #11 - Darrell Waltrip
4. #22 - Bobby Allison
5. #12 - Neil Bonnett
6. #98 - Joe Ruttman
7. #9 - Bill Elliott
8. #7 - Kyle Petty
9. #3 - Dale Earnhardt
10. #21 - Buddy Baker
- This was Bodine's first Winston Cup Series victory, and the first Cup Series victory for Charlotte car dealer Rick Hendrick as team owner.
- Bodine's victory also saved All-Star Racing from shutting down as they were able to secure sponsorship from Northwestern Security Life for the rest of the season.

=== Winston 500 ===
The Winston 500 was held on May 6 at Alabama International Motor Speedway. Cale Yarborough won the pole.

Top ten results:

1. #28 - Cale Yarborough
2. #33 - Harry Gant
3. #21 - Buddy Baker
4. #22 - Bobby Allison
5. #55 - Benny Parsons
6. #43 - Richard Petty
7. #66 - Phil Parsons
8. #75 - Dave Marcis
9. #9 - Bill Elliott
10. #47 - Ron Bouchard
- This race saw a record-breaking 75 lead changes, making it the most competitive race in Winston Cup history at the time. This record would stand until Talladega in May 2010, with had 88 lead changes.

=== Coors 420 ===
The Coors 420 was held on May 12 at Nashville Fairgrounds Speedway. Darrell Waltrip won the pole. This race ended in controversial fashion. After a crash on lap 418, Waltrip led laps 418 and 419 but Junior Johnson teammate Neil Bonnett passed him on the final lap under yellow. Dick Beaty of NASCAR initially ruled Bonnett the race winner, but the following Monday, NASCAR reversed the decision since the yellow had flown before the last lap pass, declaring Waltrip the winner.

Top ten results:

1. #11 - Darrell Waltrip
2. #12 - Neil Bonnett
3. #5 - Geoff Bodine
4. #15 - Ricky Rudd
5. #47 - Ron Bouchard
6. #88 - Rusty Wallace
7. #43 - Richard Petty
8. #44 - Terry Labonte
9. #90 - Dick Brooks
10. #75 - Dave Marcis

=== Budweiser 500 ===
The Budweiser 500 was held on May 20 at Dover Downs International Speedway. Ricky Rudd won the pole. Richard Petty held off Bill Elliott, Tim Richmond, and Harry Gant to score his 199th Winston Cup victory. Gant led 218 laps but fell out while running in the top five 108 laps from the end, while Elliott cut a tire while running second with 40 to go. It was Petty's first win not with Petty Enterprises since driving a Don Robertson Plymouth to two wins in 1970.

Top ten results:

1. #43 - Richard Petty*
2. #27 - Tim Richmond
3. #44 - Terry Labonte
4. #9 - Bill Elliott
5. #3 - Dale Earnhardt
6. #11 - Darrell Waltrip
7. #21 - Buddy Baker
8. #15 - Ricky Rudd
9. #47 - Ron Bouchard
10. #5 - Geoff Bodine
- This was Petty's first victory at Dover since 1979.
- This was Petty's first Cup Series victory not with Petty Enterprises since winning two races in 1970 driving for Don Robertson.

=== World 600 ===
The World 600 was held on May 27 at Charlotte Motor Speedway. Harry Gant won the pole. Cale Yarborough's engine failure sealed a victory for Bobby Allison.

Top ten results:

1. #22 - Bobby Allison*
2. #3 - Dale Earnhardt
3. #47 - Ron Bouchard
4. #33 - Harry Gant
5. #5 - Geoff Bodine
6. #1 - Lake Speed
7. #21 - Buddy Baker
8. #84 - Jody Ridley
9. #16 - David Pearson
10. #27 - Tim Richmond
- This would be Allison's final victory driving for DiGard Motorsports.

=== Budweiser 400 ===
The Budweiser 400 was held on June 3 at Riverside International Raceway. Terry Labonte passed Bobby Allison and led the final 23 laps for his first victory of the season.

Top ten results:

1. #44 - Terry Labonte
2. #12 - Neil Bonnett
3. #22 - Bobby Allison
4. #5 - Geoff Bodine
5. #3 - Dale Earnhardt
6. #27 - Tim Richmond
7. #98 - Joe Ruttman
8. #7 - Kyle Petty
9. #15 - Ricky Rudd
10. #9 - Bill Elliott

=== Van Scoy Diamond Mine 500 ===
The Van Scoy Diamond Mine 500 was held on June 10 at Pocono International Raceway. David Pearson drove Neil Bonnett's Chevrolet in qualifying and won the pole. Pearson also relieved Bonnett in the race and finished 14th.

Top ten results:

1. #28 - Cale Yarborough
2. #33 - Harry Gant
3. #44 - Terry Labonte
4. #9 - Bill Elliott
5. #27 - Tim Richmond
6. #11 - Darrell Waltrip
7. #22 - Bobby Allison
8. #3 - Dale Earnhardt
9. #55 - Benny Parsons
10. #1 - Lake Speed

=== Michigan 400 ===
The Michigan 400 was held on June 17 at Michigan International Speedway. Bill Elliott won the pole.

Top ten results:

1. #9 - Bill Elliott*
2. #3 - Dale Earnhardt
3. #11 - Darrell Waltrip
4. #33 - Harry Gant
5. #1 - Lake Speed
6. #22 - Bobby Allison
7. #5 - Geoff Bodine
8. #98 - Joe Ruttman
9. #16 - David Pearson
10. #21 - Buddy Baker
- This was Elliott's first superspeedway victory.

=== Firecracker 400 ===
The Firecracker 400 was held on July 4 at Daytona International Speedway. Cale Yarborough won the pole. When the caution came out with two laps to go, Richard Petty edged out Cale Yarborough at the line by about 8 inches to score his 200th and final Winston Cup Series victory.

Top ten results:

1. #43 - Richard Petty
2. #33 - Harry Gant
3. #28 - Cale Yarborough*
4. #22 - Bobby Allison
5. #55 - Benny Parsons
6. #9 - Bill Elliott
7. #44 - Terry Labonte
8. #3 - Dale Earnhardt
9. #12 - Neil Bonnett
10. #98 - Joe Ruttman
- This race was attended by acting U.S. president Ronald Reagan, who gave the command to start the race, and visited the broadcast booth to do play-by-play commentary on MRN.
- After taking the race-ending caution, Yarborough lost track of the number of laps remaining, and pulled off the track one lap early, ultimately costing him 2nd-place. Yarborough admitted after the race "my brain blew up."

=== Pepsi 420 ===
The Pepsi 420 was held on July 14 at Nashville Fairgrounds Speedway. Ricky Rudd won the pole. Geoff Bodine led 327 of 420 laps to the victory.

Top ten results:

1. #5 - Geoff Bodine
2. #11 - Darrell Waltrip
3. #3 - Dale Earnhardt
4. #47 - Ron Bouchard
5. #22 - Bobby Allison
6. #44 - Terry Labonte
7. #9 - Bill Elliott
8. #98 - Joe Ruttman
9. #33 - Harry Gant
10. #12 - Neil Bonnett
- This was the last Cup Series race to be held at Nashville Fairgrounds Speedway, and the last Cup race in the Nashville, Tennessee area until 2020 at Nashville Superspeedway.
- Richard Petty started third but fell out after 212 laps with engine failure; it was his first race having to get engines from suppliers other than the DiGard team after the Gardners ended their engine deal with Curb Motorsports.

=== Like Cola 500 ===
The Like Cola 500 was held on July 22 at Pocono International Raceway. Bill Elliott won the pole. Harry Gant past Elliott on the opening lap and edged Cale Yarborough and Elliott at the stripe after leading 107 laps.

Top ten results:

1. #33 - Harry Gant
2. #28 - Cale Yarborough
3. #9 - Bill Elliott
4. #44 - Terry Labonte
5. #55 - Benny Parsons
6. #88 - Rusty Wallace
7. #47 - Ron Bouchard
8. #7 - Kyle Petty
9. #27 - Tim Richmond
10. #3 - Dale Earnhardt

=== Talladega 500 ===
The Talladega 500 was held on July 29 at Alabama International Motor Speedway. Cale Yarborough won the pole. Dale Earnhardt fought off a ten car pack, passing Terry Labonte on the last lap to win his second consecutive Talladega 500.

Top ten results:

1. #3 - Dale Earnhardt*
2. #21 - Buddy Baker
3. #44 - Terry Labonte
4. #22 - Bobby Allison
5. #28 - Cale Yarborough
6. #11 - Darrell Waltrip
7. #33 - Harry Gant
8. #1 - Lake Speed
9. #4 - Tommy Ellis
10. #9 - Bill Elliott
- This was Earnhardt's first Cup Series victory driving for Richard Childress.
- This race featured 68 lead changes among 16 drivers.

=== Champion Spark Plug 400 ===
The Champion Spark Plug 400 was held on August 12 at Michigan International Speedway. Bill Elliott won the pole.

Top ten results:

1. #11 - Darrell Waltrip
2. #44 - Terry Labonte
3. #9 - Bill Elliott
4. #33 - Harry Gant
5. #28 - Cale Yarborough
6. #55 - Benny Parsons
7. #3 - Dale Earnhardt
8. #21 - Buddy Baker
9. #43 - Richard Petty
10. #47 - Ron Bouchard

=== Busch 500 ===
The Busch 500 was held on August 25 at Bristol International Raceway. Geoff Bodine won the pole.

Top ten results:

1. #44 - Terry Labonte*
2. #22 - Bobby Allison
3. #90 - Dick Brooks
4. #75 - Dave Marcis
5. #33 - Harry Gant
6. #9 - Bill Elliott
7. #71 - Mike Alexander
8. #95 - Sterling Marlin
9. #51 - Greg Sacks
10. #3 - Dale Earnhardt
- Labonte's victory allowed him to pass Dale Earnhardt for the points lead, which he would hold for the rest of the season.
- Darrell Waltrip led 144 laps but suffered issues after halfway and finished 21st, ending his chances of an eighth consecutive Bristol victory.

=== Southern 500 ===
The Southern 500 was held on September 2 at Darlington Raceway. Harry Gant won the pole. Amid numerous crashes, Gant led 277 laps to an easy victory.

Top ten results:

1. #33 - Harry Gant*
2. #27 - Tim Richmond
3. #21 - Buddy Baker
4. #88 - Rusty Wallace
5. #15 - Ricky Rudd
6. #90 - Dick Brooks
7. #66 - Phil Parsons
8. #44 - Terry Labonte
9. #55 - Benny Parsons
10. #22 - Bobby Allison
- Gant's victory moved him to 2nd in points behind Terry Labonte.
- Dale Earnhardt suffered a blown engine and finished 38th, dropping him from 2nd to 4th in the points standings.

=== Capital City 400 ===
The Capitol City 400 was held on September 9 at Richmond Fairgrounds Raceway. Darrell Waltrip won the pole.

Top ten results:

1. #11 - Darrell Waltrip
2. #15 - Ricky Rudd
3. #3 - Dale Earnhardt*
4. #5 - Geoff Bodine
5. #43 - Richard Petty
6. #7 - Kyle Petty
7. #12 - Neil Bonnett
8. #44 - Terry Labonte
9. #33 - Harry Gant
10. #90 - Dick Brooks
- Earnhardt's 3rd-place finish moved him back up to 2nd in points behind Labonte.

=== Delaware 500 ===
The Delaware 500 was held on September 16 at Dover Downs International Speedway. Terry Labonte won the pole. Harry Gant and Labonte combined to lead 385 of 500 laps.

Top ten results:

1. #33 - Harry Gant
2. #44 - Terry Labonte
3. #15 - Ricky Rudd
4. #75 - Dave Marcis
5. #3 - Dale Earnhardt
6. #12 - Neil Bonnett
7. #90 - Dick Brooks
8. #47 - Ron Bouchard
9. #5 - Geoff Bodine
10. #48 - Trevor Boys

=== Goody's 500 ===
The Goody's 500 was held on September 23 at Martinsville Speedway. Geoff Bodine won the pole. Darrell Waltrip led 313 laps en route to victory, but was still 215 points out of the lead following this race.

Top ten results:

1. #11 - Darrell Waltrip
2. #44 - Terry Labonte*
3. #9 - Bill Elliott
4. #33 - Harry Gant
5. #12 - Neil Bonnett
6. #21 - Buddy Baker
7. #75 - Dave Marcis
8. #43 - Richard Petty
9. #71 - Lennie Pond
10. #7 - Kyle Petty
- Terry Labonte's 2nd-place finish extended his points lead to 91 points over Harry Gant.

=== Miller High Life 500 ===
The Miller High Life 500 was held on October 7 at Charlotte Motor Speedway. Benny Parsons won the pole. Parsons and Bill Elliott combined to lead 284 of 334 laps.

Top ten results:

1. #9 - Bill Elliott
2. #55 - Benny Parsons
3. #28 - Cale Yarborough
4. #33 - Harry Gant
5. #44 - Terry Labonte
6. #5 - Geoff Bodine
7. #84 - Jody Ridley
8. #15 - Ricky Rudd
9. #43 - Richard Petty
10. #22 - Bobby Allison

=== Holly Farms 400 ===
The Holly Farms 400 was held on October 14 at North Wilkesboro Speedway. Darrell Waltrip won the pole. Both of Junior Johnson's Chevrolets led 305 of 400 laps.

Top ten results:

1. #11 - Darrell Waltrip*
2. #33 - Harry Gant*
3. #22 - Bobby Allison
4. #12 - Neil Bonnett
5. #88 - Rusty Wallace
6. #15 - Ricky Rudd
7. #3 - Dale Earnhardt
8. #9 - Bill Elliott
9. #44 - Terry Labonte
10. #21 - Buddy Baker
- This was Waltrip seventh victory of 1984, but inconsistency effectively took him out of the championship fight.
- Gant's 2nd-place finish allowed him to close in on Terry Labonte's championship lead, reducing it to 59 points.

=== Warner W. Hodgdon American 500 ===
The Warner W. Hodgdon American 500 was held on October 21 at North Carolina Motor Speedway. Geoff Bodine won the pole. Bill Elliott and Harry Gant combined to lead 299 laps, with Elliott beating Gant in a photo finish.

Top ten results:

1. #9 - Bill Elliott
2. #33 - Harry Gant
3. #44 - Terry Labonte
4. #11 - Darrell Waltrip
5. #22 - Bobby Allison
6. #98 - Morgan Shepherd
7. #21 - Buddy Baker
8. #27 - Tim Richmond
9. #75 - Dave Marcis
10. #71 - Lennie Pond
- This was the third consecutive race where Gant finished ahead of Labonte, further reducing Labonte's championship lead to just 49 points ahead of Gant.

=== Atlanta Journal 500 ===
The Atlanta Journal 500 was held on November 11 at Atlanta International Raceway. Bill Elliott won the pole. Tragedy struck this race when Terry Schoonover, making his second Cup Series start, was killed after crashing in the backstretch on lap 122.

Top ten results:

1. #3 - Dale Earnhardt
2. #9 - Bill Elliott
3. #15 - Ricky Rudd
4. #55 - Benny Parsons
5. #22 - Bobby Allison
6. #11 - Darrell Waltrip
7. #1 - Lake Speed
8. #43 - Richard Petty
9. #95 - Sterling Marlin
10. #75 - Dave Marcis
- Both Terry Labonte and Harry Gant fell out with engine failures, with Labonte holding a 42-point lead over Gant going into the season finale.

=== Winston Western 500 ===
The Winston Western 500 was held on November 18 at Riverside International Raceway. Points leader Terry Labonte won the pole and finished 3rd, clinching the 1984 Winston Cup championship by 65 points over Harry Gant, who finished 8th.

Top ten results:

1. #5 - Geoff Bodine*
2. #27 - Tim Richmond
3. #44 - Terry Labonte
4. #9 - Bill Elliott
5. #55 - Benny Parsons
6. #12 - Neil Bonnett
7. #22 - Bobby Allison
8. #33 - Harry Gant
9. #04 - Hershel McGriff
10. #4 - Joe Ruttman
- Race winner Geoff Bodine referenced budding rumors about Riverside's future when he said he was glad to have won as "they're going to tear this place down."
- Open-wheel driver Bobby Rahal made his only NASCAR start in this race, driving the #21 Wood Brothers Racing Ford. Rahal would drop out of the race on lap 44 due to mechanical problems.

== Race results ==
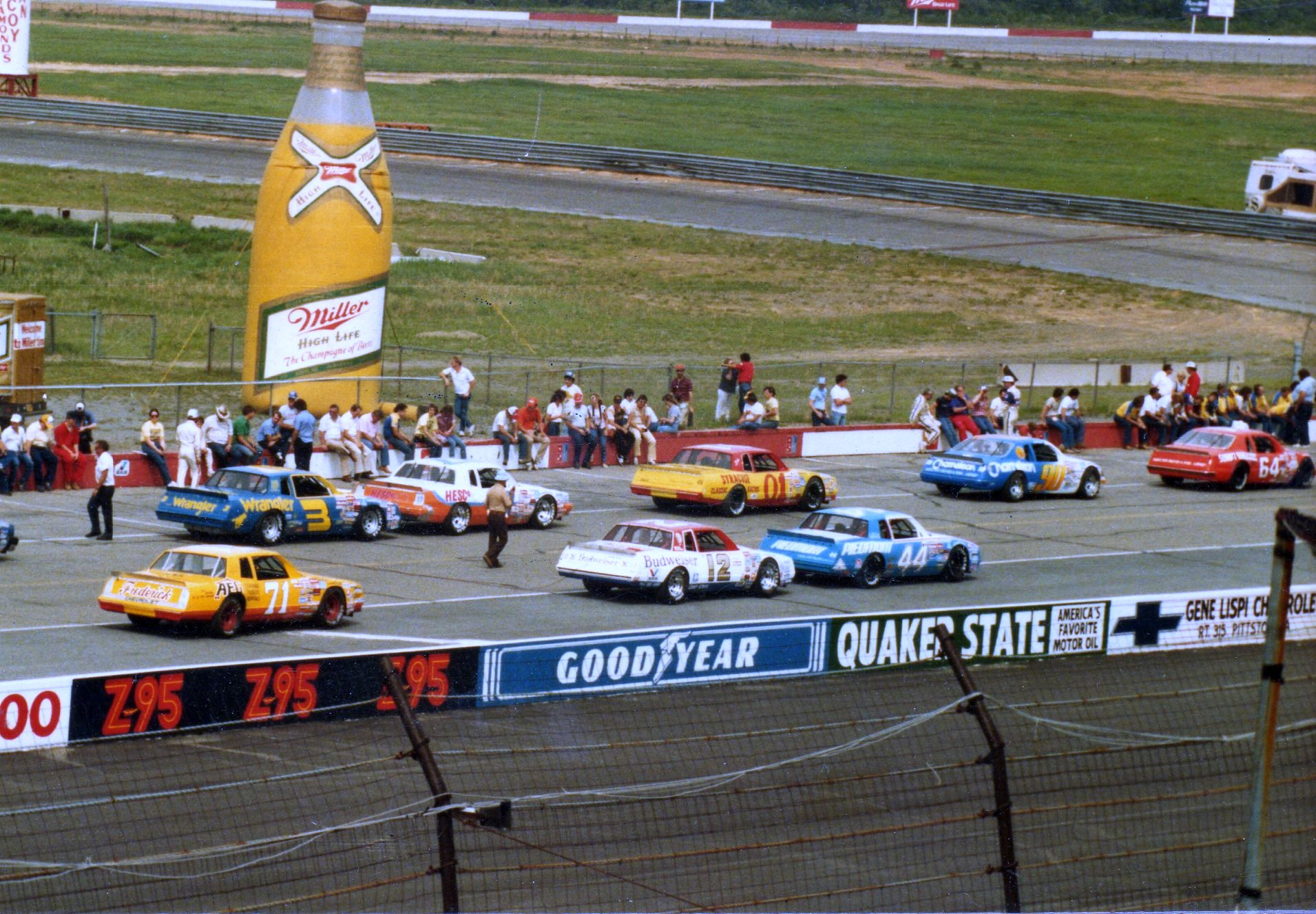
Cup cars at Van Scoy Diamond Mine 500 at Pocono

Rd.	Date	Event	Circuit	Winner
**NC**	February 9	Busch Clash	Daytona International Speedway	Neil Bonnett
**NC**	February 16	UNO Twin 125 #1	Daytona International Speedway	Cale Yarborough
**NC**	February 16	UNO Twin 125 #2	Daytona International Speedway	Bobby Allison
**NC**	February 17	Daytona 500 Consolation Race	Daytona International Speedway	Connie Saylor
1	February 19	**Daytona 500**	Daytona International Speedway	Cale Yarborough
2	February 26	Miller High Life 400	Richmond Fairgrounds Raceway	Ricky Rudd
3	March 4	Hodgdon Carolina 500	North Carolina Motor Speedway	Bobby Allison
4	March 18	Coca-Cola 500	Atlanta International Raceway	Benny Parsons
5	April 1	Valleydale 500	Bristol International Raceway	Darrell Waltrip
6	April 8	Northwestern Bank 400	North Wilkesboro Speedway	Tim Richmond
7	April 15	TranSouth 500	Darlington International Raceway	Darrell Waltrip
8	April 29	Sovran Bank 500	Martinsville Speedway	Geoff Bodine
9	May 6	**Winston 500**	Alabama International Motor Speedway	Cale Yarborough
10	May 12	Coors 420	Nashville Speedway	Darrell Waltrip
11	May 20	Mason-Dixon 500	Dover Downs International Speedway	Richard Petty
12	May 27	**World 600**	Charlotte Motor Speedway	Bobby Allison
13	June 5	Budweiser 400	Riverside International Raceway	Terry Labonte
14	June 10	Van Scoy Diamond Mine 500	Pocono Raceway	Cale Yarborough
15	June 17	Miller 400	Michigan International Speedway	Bill Elliott
16	July 4	Firecracker 400	Daytona International Speedway	Richard Petty
17	July 14	Pepsi 420	Nashville Speedway	Geoff Bodine
18	July 22	Like Cola 500	Pocono Raceway	Harry Gant
19	July 29	Talladega 500	Alabama International Motor Speedway	Dale Earnhardt
20	August 12	Champion Spark Plug 400	Michigan International Speedway	Darrell Waltrip
21	August 25	Busch 500	Bristol International Raceway	Terry Labonte
22	September 2	**Southern 500**	Darlington International Raceway	Harry Gant
23	September 9	Wrangler SanforSet 400	Richmond Fairgrounds Raceway	Darrell Waltrip
24	September 16	Delaware 500	Dover Downs International Speedway	Harry Gant
25	September 23	Goody's 500	Martinsville Speedway	Darrell Waltrip
26	October 7	Miller 500	Charlotte Motor Speedway	Bill Elliott
27	October 14	Holly Farms 400	North Wilkesboro Speedway	Darrell Waltrip
28	October 21	Hodgdon American 500	North Carolina Motor Speedway	Bill Elliott
29	November 11	Atlanta Journal 500	Atlanta International Raceway	Dale Earnhardt
30	November 18	Winston Western 500	Riverside International Raceway	Geoff Bodine

Bold denotes NASCAR Crown Jewel event.

== Full Drivers' Championship ==
(key) Bold – Pole position awarded by time. Italics – Pole position set by owner's points. * – Most laps led.

Pos	Driver	DAY	RCH	CAR	ATL	BRI	NWS	DAR	MAR	TAL	NSV	DOV	CLT	RIV	POC	MCH	DAY	NSV	POC	TAL	MCH	BRI	DAR	RCH	DOV	MAR	CLT	NWS	CAR	ATL	RIV	Pts
1	Terry Labonte	12	3	2	7	2	4	2	24	25	8	3	30	**1***	3	31	7	6	4	3	2*	1*	8	8	2	2	5	9	3	30	**3**	4508
2	Harry Gant	6	8	24	6	23	2	6	13	2	16	27*	**4**	29	2	4	2	9	1*	7	4	5	**1***	9	1*	4	4	2	2*	26	8	4443
3	Bill Elliott	5	4	8	11	9	10	3	7	9	20	4	28	10	4	**1**	6	7	**3**	10	**3**	6	15	24	32	3	1	8	1	**2**	4	4377
4	Dale Earnhardt	2	6	14	2	7	8	5	9	27	19	5	2	5	8	2	8	3	10	1	7	10	38	3	5	12	39	7	13	1	11	4265
5	Darrell Waltrip	3	**2***	10	10	1*	6	1*	3	38	**1**	6	26	11	6	3	31	2	22	6	1	21*	40	**1***	11	1*	27	**1***	4	6	34	4230
6	Bobby Allison	34	30	1	5	19	22	20	4*	4	12	12	1*	3	7	6	4	5	28	4	11	2	10	25	36	23	10	3	5	5	7*	4094
7	Ricky Rudd	7	1	7	8	**6**	**3***	9	18	22	4	**8**	11	9	18	40	15	**16**	39	14	12	16	5	2	3	27	8	6	23	3	15	3918
8	Neil Bonnett	4	5	28	33	11	9	10	5	23	2*	15	12	2	**14**	17	9	10	19	19	13	23	30	7	6	5	16	4	33	21	6	3802
9	Geoff Bodine	8	9	6	13	25	14	35	1	34	3	10	5	4	36	7	12	1*	12	26	34	**22**	12	4	9	**28**	6	23	**19**	24*	1	3734
10	Richard Petty	31	15	4	4	8	12	7	12	6	7	1	34	23	13	34	1	25	27	23	9	17	29	5	37	8	9	18	15	8	14	3643
11	Ron Bouchard	27	29	21	12	3	7	17	2	10	5	9	3	19	19	20	34	4	7	16	10	14	33	13	8	19	11	28	14	12	35	3609
12	Tim Richmond	33	7	27	34	5	1	34	23	26	28	2	10	6	5	16	11	14	9	33	15	25	2	20	28	21	30	13	8	13	2	3505
13	Dave Marcis	42	11	9	18	4	13	13	19	8	10	20	36	34	15	21	18	23	26	13	19	4	21	16	4	7	24	26	9	10	20	3416
14	Rusty Wallace **(R)**	30	16	26	19	12	28	30	15	31	6	11	15	20	17	14	20	18	6	12	35	20	4	11	30	13	14	5	26	15	26	3316
15	Dick Brooks	26	19	23*	14	30	11	31	11	30	9	35	13	12	20	11	38	27	11	35	18	3	6	10	7	11	13	11	30	17	24	3265
16	Kyle Petty	40	17	31	38	26	5	24	8	15	11	13	37	8	12	12	30	15	8	22	17	24	32	6	14	10	17	20	24	22	28	3159
17	Trevor Boys	41	26	19	15	16	17	16	22	18	17	19	35	13	32	37	16	22	13	24	27	18	11	27	10	26	12	27	11	23	12	3040
18	Joe Ruttman	28	10	17	28	10	30	19	**6**	21	15	14	41	7	11	8	10	8	14	37	20	29	13	30	33	29	40		34	35	10	2945
19	Greg Sacks **(R)**	18	24	34	16		18	21	17	14	29	24	38	32	22	32	39	29	24	29	22	9	37	21	25	30	18	24	35	31	16	2545
20	Buddy Arrington	25		15	20	22	20	11	25	24	21	32	32	21	23	18	36	17	16	21	31	13	28	23	17	18	DNQ	29	20	DNQ	DNQ	2504
21	Buddy Baker	38		5	**23**			33	10	3		7	7		35	10	41			2*	8		3	19	26	6	29	10	7	20		2477
22	Cale Yarborough	**1***	14		3			4		**1**			21		1*	13*	**3***		2	**5**	5		17	14			3			11		2448
23	Clark Dwyer **(R)**	20	27	12	40	18	16	15	21	29	25	22	23	17	25	39	25	24	15	28	40	15	20	26	18				38		25	2374
24	Phil Parsons **(R)**	11	18		29	13	15	8	16	7			31		21	15	13	13	17	20	29	26	7			20	31	15		28	41	2290
25	Jimmy Means	17	28	13		17	25	14		40	22	16	27						25		26	30	18	18	15	15	19	16	18	16	21	2218
26	Lake Speed	37	12	3	9			22		33		21	6		10	5	42			8	16		14				32	25	29	7	17	2023
27	Benny Parsons	29			1*			**27**		5*			42		9	28	5		5	Wth	6		9				**2***			4	5	1865
28	Mike Alexander	21	21	11	31	29	21	32	31	17	13		16	31		23	22	12		17	24	7	34									1862
29	Morgan Shepherd		13			27		26	26			36	17			22	40	26		30	28	19	35	12	22	24	23		6	14	22	1811
30	Ronnie Thomas	24	31	32	25	15	26	28	30	20	23	30		DNQ	24	25	29	21	40	27	23	27	DNQ	DNQ	35	16	DNQ	QL		DNQ	DNQ	1775
31	Tommy Ellis					28	29	23	29	13	14		14			38	14	11	34	9	36	28	19	15	34	17	33	14				1738
32	Bobby Hillin Jr.	35			37			12		11		25	33		16	19	37		33	15	21		23		DNQ		15		12	33		1477
33	Tommy Gale	32		30	24	20	23	18		19	27	23	25		27	33	24		36	DNQ		11	22									1426
34	J. D. McDuffie	DNQ	23	16		21	24				26	33			39	DNQ		DNQ	31	DNQ	DNQ	12	24	28	16	25	DNQ	30	36	DNQ	30	1366
35	Jody Ridley	10			27			36		16			8			35	19	28		34	14		16		29		7			32		1288
36	Doug Heveron	23	DNQ		30	14			28	36			40		26	30	28		21		37		DNQ		13	14	37			18	23	1265
37	Sterling Marlin	15		35						12	18		29		33		33	30		32	32	8	39				35			9		1207
38	Lennie Pond	13	20	25	39			38																17	12	9	25	12	10	37		923
39	Dean Combs	19	25		32		31		27			29	18			36	32				38			DNQ			28			36		903
40	Ken Ragan	14			21								19			26	26		35	11			26				36			40		873
41	David Pearson	9	32					37		32			9		QL	9	17				39		41				38			25		812
42	D. K. Ulrich			22		24	19	29			24	17		18	37	29																810
43	Connie Saylor	22		33				25					39			DNQ	27		29				31				34					367
44	Jerry Bowman	DNQ										18			38				30						38				32			362
45	Elliott Forbes-Robinson	DNQ								39						24				38							20			19		349
46	Jeff Hooker																	20			30			DNQ				21	39			322
47	Bobby Wawak	DNQ													28	DNQ			32								22		28			307
48	Dick May											28													19				16			300
49	Dean Roper	16								28							21															294
50	Bobby Gerhart														34				38		DNQ			DNQ	39			19				262
51	Jim Southard	DNQ										31			31			DNQ	20						20		DNQ		DNQ			243
52	Mark Stahl	DNQ		18																			DNQ				DNQ		27	38		240
53	Ken Schrader																	19			33						26	17		27		228
54	Randy Baker	DNQ											24							39			27									219
55	Jim Robinson													14																	29	197
56	Sumner McKnight													25																	19	194
57	Derrike Cope													15										29							18	194
58	H. B. Bailey				22											DNQ					DNQ		25									185
59	Bill Schmitt													39																	13	170
60	Steve Moore	DNQ														DNQ	35			18												167
61	Harry Goularte													22																	31	167
62	Ron Esau													27																	27	164
63	Joe Fields		DNQ									26												DNQ	31							155
64	Delma Cowart	DNQ			36								22							DNQ	DNQ											152
65	Phil Barkdoll									35										25												146
66	Eddie Bierschwale																			31										29		146
67	Hershel McGriff													35																	9	143
68	Jimmy Ingalls																		37						40			DNQ	22			140
69	Jim Bown													28																	36	139
70	Ruben Garcia													33																	32	131
71	Rick McCray													30																	37	125
72	Dale Jarrett								14								23												37			121
73	Scott Miller													36																	33	119
74	Glenn Francis													16																	DNQ	115
75	Joe Millikan																												17	DNQ	38	112
76	A. J. Foyt	39			35															36											41	101
77	L. D. Ottinger																										21	22				97
78	John Krebs													40																	39	89
79	Bob Fox																											DNQ	25			88
80	Tommie Crozier																	DNQ				DNQ			27							82
81	Brent Elliott						27																	DNQ				DNQ	DNQ			82
82	Rick Newsom	DNQ		29												DNQ							DNQ				DNQ					76
83	Steve Gray														30																	73
84	Buddie Boys																	DNQ							DNQ			DNQ	31			70
85	Terry Schoonover																												21	34		61
86	Jerry Churchill	DNQ										34				DNQ																61
87	Dick Trickle	36																														55
88	Jim Sauter	DNQ			17					37			20																			52
89	Jerry Jolly													38																		49
90	Bob Penrod																													39		46
91	Grant Adcox	DNQ																		40												43
92	Bobby Rahal																														40	43
93	Donny Paul	DNQ														DNQ					DNQ						41					40
94	Jimmy Hensley		22						20															22		22						
95	Gene Coyle																		18						21							
96	Laurent Rioux	DNQ		20																												
97	Johnny Coy Jr.																								23							
98	Charles Poalillo																		23													
99	Phil Good																								24				DNQ			
100	Kevin Terris													24																		
101	Rodney Combs																				25											
102	Don Hume				26																											
103	Roy Smith													26																		
104	David Simko	DNQ														27																
105	Bob Riley														29																	
106	Maurice Randall										30					DNQ		DNQ			DNQ				DNQ			DNQ	DNQ			
107	Sam Ard																									31						
108	Slick Johnson															DNQ							36									
109	Blackie Wangerin	DNQ		36																DNQ							DNQ					
110	Gary Mayeda													37																		
111	Mike Potter															DNQ						DNQ							40			
112	Tom Sneva	DNQ																														
113	Wayne Peterson	DNQ																														
114	Randy LaJoie	DNQ																														
115	Joe Booher	DNQ																														
116	Ronnie Sanders	DNQ																														
117	Jim Hurlbert	DNQ																														
118	Ramo Stott	DNQ																														
119	Natz Peters	DNQ																														
120	Jocko Maggiacomo	DNQ																														
121	Ralph Jones	DNQ																														
122	Lowell Cowell	DNQ																														
123	Jack Ingram	DNQ																														
124	Philip Duffie	DNQ																														
125	Louie Littlepage		DNQ																				DNQ	DNQ								
126	Robert Ingram		DNQ																					DNQ								
127	Don Puskarich													DNQ																		
128	Doug Wheeler															DNQ																
129	Bill Simpson															DNQ																
130	John McFadden															DNQ						DNQ						DNQ				
131	Jimmy Walker																	DNQ														
132	Keith Davis																		DNQ													
133	Jim Hull																				DNQ											
134	John Ingalls																				DNQ											
135	Don Satterfield																					DNQ										
136	Buddy Fox																										DNQ					
137	Jonathan Lee Edwards																										DNQ					
138	St. James Davis																														DNQ	
139	Bill Osborne																														DNQ	
140	Pat Mintey																														DNQ	
141	Bob Kennedy																														DNQ	
142	Scott Autrey																														DNQ	
143	John Soares Jr.																														DNQ	
Pos	Driver	DAY	RCH	CAR	ATL	BRI	NWS	DAR	MAR	TAL	NSV	DOV	CLT	RIV	POC	MCH	DAY	NSV	POC	TAL	MCH	BRI	DAR	RCH	DOV	MAR	CLT	NWS	CAR	ATL	RIV	Pts

== Rookie of the year ==
Rusty Wallace, a future hall of famer (see Class of 2013 hall of fame), beat out Dean Combs, Clark Dwyer, Tommy Ellis, Doug Heveron, Phil Parsons, and Greg Sacks to win the award in 1984. Only Wallace competed in all 30 races. Combs competed in 12 races. Dwyer competed in 26 races (he skipped rounds 25-27). Ellis competed in 20 races (he skipped rounds 1-4, 11, 13-14, and 28-30). Heveron competed in 16 races (he failed to qualify for the spring Richmond race and the Southern 500). Parsons competed in 23 races (He skipped rounds 3-4, 10-11, 13, 23-24, and 28). Sacks competed in 29 races only skipping the spring Bristol race.

== See also ==
- 1984 NASCAR Busch Series
- 1984 NASCAR Winston West Series
