= 1984 Talladega 500 =

Auto race held at Talladega Superspeedway in 1984

Race details
- Race 19 of 30 in the 1984 NASCAR Winston Cup Series season
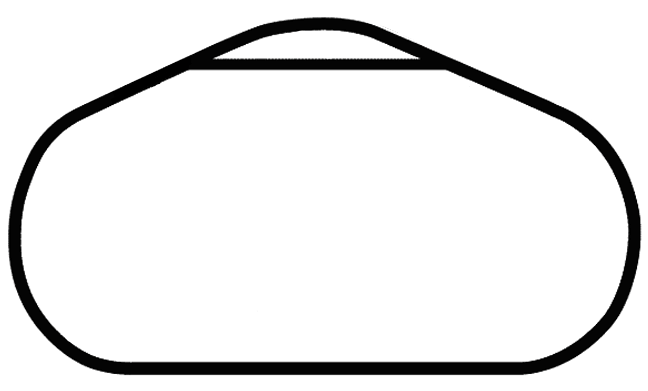
- Layout of Talladega Superspeedway
- Date: July 29, 1984
- Official name: Talladega 500
- Location: Alabama International Motor Speedway, Talladega, Alabama
- Course: Permanent racing facility
- Course length: 4.280 km (2.660 miles)
- Distance: 188 laps, 500.1 mi (804.8 km)
- Weather: Temperatures of 84 °F (29 °C); wind speeds of 8 miles per hour (13 km/h)
- Average speed: 155.485 mph (250.229 km/h)
- Attendance: 94,000

Pole position
Driver	Cale Yarborough	Ranier-Lundy Racing

Most laps led
Driver	Buddy Baker	Wood Brothers Racing
- Laps: 41

Winner
No. 3	Dale Earnhardt	Richard Childress Racing

Television in the United States
- Network: CBS
- Announcers: Ken Squier; Ned Jarrett; Benny Parsons

The 1984 Talladega 500 was a NASCAR Winston Cup Series race held at Talladega Superspeedway on July 29, 1984.

It was the 19th of 30 races for the 1984 Winston Cup Grand National season and was telecast live flag to flag on the CBS television network. Cale Yarborough, the winner of that season's Daytona 500, Winston 500 earlier that season at Talladega, and Van Scoy Diamond 500 at Pocono won the pole at a speed of 202.474 mph. Bill Elliott qualified second.

== Background ==
Talladega Superspeedway, originally known as Alabama International Motor Superspeedway (AIMS), is a motorsports complex located north of Talladega, Alabama. It is located on the former Anniston Air Force Base in the small city of Lincoln. The track is a Tri-oval and was constructed by International Speedway Corporation, a business controlled by the France Family, in the 1960s. Talladega is most known for its steep banking and the unique location of the start/finish line - located just past the exit to pit road. The track currently hosts the NASCAR series such as the Monster Energy Cup Series, Xfinity Series, and the Camping World Truck Series. Talladega Superspeedway is the longest NASCAR oval with a length of 2.66 miles (4.28 km), and the track at its peak had a seating capacity of 175,000 spectators.

== Race report ==
Four drivers failed to qualify for: Delma Cowart, J.D. McDuffie, Blackie Wangerin and Tommy Gale. The top ten starters were Dale Earnhardt, Terry Labonte, Tommy Ellis, Buddy Baker, Darrell Waltrip, Neil Bonnett, Ron Bouchard, and rookie Rusty Wallace. Richard Petty, who'd won the Firecracker 400 earlier that month, qualified 11th following word that the Smithsonian Institution wanted to put on permanent display the racecar (a 1984 Pontiac Grand Prix stock car under the ownership of Curb Motorsports) with which he'd won his 200th victory at the Firecracker 400 at Daytona.

Benny Parsons had qualified ninth for the race but crashed hard in practice and was not medically cleared to race, so he was brought up to the CBS Sports broadcast booth alongside Ken Squier and Ned Jarrett for the telecast. Working pit road was veteran MRN Radio broadcaster Mike Joy and National Speed Sport News editor Chris Economaki; Economaki also hosted a short feature (aired during a lengthy caution period) on the nearby Talladega Short Track and its participants' thoughts on someday racing at the superspeedway.

The race became one of the most competitive in racing history, as the lead changed 68 times among 16 drivers. Earnhardt, driving a Chevrolet Monte Carlo for Richard Childress, had taken the lead in Winston Cup points at that point of the season but had not won a race. He took the lead on the opening lap and was soon challenged by Yarborough, Baker, Bobby Allison, Petty, and Labonte. Petty passed Yarborough and Earnhardt on Lap 31 but Earnhardt beat him to the stripe; soon after Elliott Forbes-Robinson crashed and Petty's transmission broke on the subsequent pitstop.

Lap 157 provided the most serious accident of the day when Trevor Boys, racing in the top ten with Ellis, was clipped off Turn Four, spun, and flipped onto his roof at the pit road entrance before tumbling into the tri-oval grass. Boys climbed out of the car uninjured; the only bad thing that happened is that he had to tie his shoe.

Earnhardt intentionally dragged the brake entering turn 1 on the final lap, got a massive run and slingshotted past Terry Labonte on the backstretch to take the win.

Notable crew chiefs in this race were Kenny Wallace, Junie Donlavey, Darrell Bryant, Joey Arrington, Cecil Gordon, Dale Inman, Travis Carter, Waddell Wilson, Tim Brewer, Bud Moore, Jeff Hammond, Jake Elder, Harry Hyde and Kirk Shelmerdine.

=== Qualifying ===
Grid	No.	Driver	Manufacturer
1	28	Cale Yarborough	Chevrolet
2	9	Bill Elliott	Ford
3	3	Dale Earnhardt	Chevrolet
4	44	Terry Labonte	Chevrolet
5	4	Tommy Ellis	Chevrolet
6	21	Buddy Baker	Ford
7	11	Darrell Waltrip	Chevrolet
8	12	Neil Bonnett	Chevrolet
9	47	Ron Bouchard	Buick
10	88	Rusty Wallace	Pontiac
11	43	Richard Petty	Pontiac
12	75	Dave Marcis	Pontiac
13	84	Jody Ridley	Chevrolet
14	33	Harry Gant	Chevrolet
15	1	Lake Speed	Chevrolet
16	22	Bobby Allison	Buick
17	66	Phil Parsons	Chevrolet
18	90	Dick Brooks	Ford
19	14	A.J. Foyt	Oldsmobile
20	95	Sterling Marlin	Chevrolet
21	38	Phil Barkdoll	Chevrolet
22	51	Greg Sacks	Chevrolet
23	27	Tim Richmond	Pontiac
24	15	Ricky Rudd	Ford
25	67	Buddy Arrington	Chrysler
26	7	Kyle Petty	Ford
27	98	Joe Ruttman	Chevrolet
28	5	Geoff Bodine	Chevrolet
29	48	Trevor Boys	Chevrolet
30	41	Ronnie Thomas	Chevrolet
31	29	Grant Adcox	Chevrolet
32	8	Bobby Hillin, Jr.	Chevrolet
33	71	Mike Alexander	Oldsmobile
34	87	Randy Baker	Buick
35	77	Ken Ragan	Chevrolet
36	52	Morgan Shepherd	Chevrolet
37	17	Clark Dwyer	Chevrolet
38	03	Eddie Bierschwale	Chevrolet
39	2	Elliot Forbes-Robinson	Chevrolet
40	73	Steve Moore	Chevrolet

=== Finish ===
The finish shook into an eleven-car battle; Bouchard ran out of gas with three laps to go and Labonte held the lead; his crew chief Dale Inman radioed Labonte to get out of the lead with two to go fearing a last-lap pass, but by this point Harry Gant had raced into contention and was battling Earnhardt and Baker for second.

Earnhardt broke away to a ten-length win with Baker edging Labonte for second and Allison edging Yarborough for fourth. It was the second year in a row that he won the race and he won both races with last lap passes. He became the first driver to win back to back Talladega 500s (he also completed the feat in 1990-1991 and he won back to back Winston 500's in 1999-2000). The prior year he won in a Ford driving for Bud Moore. This was his first win with Richard Childress driving a Chevrolet.

Earnhardt led thirteen times for 40 laps. Six of the ten positions behind Earnhardt were decided by photo finishes at the line. Also, Earnhardt started the race in third, led the first lap and the last.

Individual paychecks for each driver ranged from the winner's share of $47,100 ($142,552 when adjusted for inflation) to the last-place finisher's share of $1,800 ($5,448 when adjusted for inflation) from a total purse of $352,500. ($1,066,871 when adjusted for inflation).

Ken Ragan received his only lead lap finish of his career at this race.

== Top 20 finishers ==
Pos	No.	Driver	Manufacturer	Laps	Laps led	Time/Status
1	3	Dale Earnhardt	Chevrolet	188	40	3:12:04
2	21	Buddy Baker	Ford	188	41	+1.66 seconds
3	44	Terry Labonte	Chevrolet	188	19	Lead lap under green flag
4	22	Bobby Allison	Buick	188	16	Lead lap under green flag
5	28	Cale Yarborough	Chevrolet	188	34	Lead lap under green flag
6	11	Darrell Waltrip	Chevrolet	188	1	Lead lap under green flag
7	33	Harry Gant	Chevrolet	188	2	Lead lap under green flag
8	1	Lake Speed	Chevrolet	188	0	Lead lap under green flag
9	4	Tommy Ellis	Chevrolet	188	1	Lead lap under green flag
10	9	Bill Elliott	Ford	188	6	Lead lap under green flag
11	77	Ken Ragan	Chevrolet	188	1	Lead lap under green flag
12	88	Rusty Wallace	Pontiac	188	0	Lead lap under green flag
13	75	Dave Marcis	Pontiac	188	4	Lead lap under green flag
14	15	Ricky Rudd	Ford	188	0	Lead lap under green flag
15	8	Bobby Hillin, Jr.	Chevrolet	188	0	Lead lap under green flag
16	47	Ron Bouchard	Buick	187	9	+1 lap
17	71	Mike Alexander	Oldsmobile	185	0	+3 laps
18	73	Steve Moore	Chevrolet	184	0	+4 laps
19	12	Neil Bonnett	Chevrolet	178	1	+10 laps
20	66	Phil Parsons	Chevrolet	164	0	+24 laps

== Standings after the race ==
Pos	Driver	Points	Differential
1	Dale Earnhardt	2848	0
2 ▲	Terry Labonte	2778	-70
3 ▼	Bill Elliott	2764	-84
4	Darrell Waltrip	2734	-114
5	Harry Gant	2703	-145
6	Bobby Allison	2619	-229
7	Neil Bonnett	2456	-392
8	Geoff Bodine	2426	-422
9	Ricky Rudd	2425	-423
10	Ron Bouchard	2392	-456

Preceded by 1984 Like Cola 500	NASCAR Winston Cup Series Season; 1984	Succeeded by 1984 Champion Spark Plug 400

Preceded by 1983	Talladega 500 races 1984	Succeeded by 1985
