= 1985 Daytona 500 =

Auto race held at Daytona International Speedway in 1985

Race details
- Race 1 of 28 in the 1985 NASCAR Winston Cup Series season
- 1985 Daytona 500 program cover
- Date: February 17, 1985
- Location: Daytona International Speedway; Daytona Beach, Florida, U.S.
- Course: Permanent racing facility 2.5 mi (4.023 km)
- Distance: 200 laps, 500 mi (804.672 km)
- Weather: Temperatures of 73 °F (23 °C); wind speeds of 14 mph (23 km/h)
- Average speed: 172.265 mph (277.234 km/h)

Pole position
Driver	Bill Elliott 43.878 seconds 205.114 mph (330.099 km/h)	Melling Racing

Qualifying race winners
Duel 1 Winner	Bill Elliott	Melling Racing
Duel 2 Winner	Cale Yarborough	Ranier-Lundy

Most laps led
Driver	Bill Elliott	Melling Racing
- Laps: 136

Winner
No. 9	Bill Elliott	Melling Racing

Television in the United States
- Network: CBS
- Announcers: Host: Chris Economaki; Lap-by-lap: Ken Squier; Driver analyst: David Hobbs; Driver analyst: Ned Jarrett; Pit reporter: Chris Economaki; Pit reporter: Mike Joy
- Nielsen ratings: 8.3/23 (9.8 million viewers)

The 1985 Daytona 500, the 27th running of the event, was held on February 17, 1985, at Daytona International Speedway, in Daytona Beach, Florida.

== Race report ==
Bill Elliott won the pole at a then-record speed of 205.114 mph. After a mediocre run in the Busch Clash, Elliott nearly lapped the field in his 125-mile qualifying race, then thoroughly dominated the Daytona 500, leading 136 of the 200 laps in his #9 Coors/Melling Ford Thunderbird. The race restarted on the last lap after a Neil Bonnett spin out with less than four laps to go; Bonnett got out of his car and was credited for a 10th-place finish. The race saw a number of engine problems, which knocked many of the contenders, including former Daytona 500 winners David Pearson, A. J. Foyt, Benny Parsons, Bobby Allison, and two-time defending race winner Cale Yarborough, who was trying to win his third straight Daytona 500 victory.

The only car that could consistently run with Elliott was Cale Yarborough, and when his engine went up in smoke on lap 62 the race was for all intents and purposes over. Hendrick Motorsports landed its first big-time full-season sponsorship for 1985 with Levi Garrett chewing tobacco coming aboard to sponsor the #5 Chevrolet of Geoff Bodine. The car's first points race in its new yellow-and-white paint scheme saw Bodine post a solid top-10 run, kicking off a several-year partnership.

There were 12 cars that were knocked out just from engine problems; with a lot of big names affected (Neil Bonnett, who somehow finished 10th even with a blown engine; defending champion Terry Labonte; both Parsons brothers; Kyle Petty; Harry Gant; David Pearson; Bobby Allison and 2-time defending Daytona 500 champion Cale Yarborough among them).

== Qualifying ==
=== Qualifying results ===
Pos	No.	Driver	Team	Manufacturer	Speed
1	9	Bill Elliott	Harry Melling	Ford Thunderbird	205.114
2	28	Cale Yarborough	Harry Ranier	Ford Thunderbird	203.814
3	11	Darrell Waltrip	Junior Johnson	Chevrolet Monte Carlo	
4	21	David Pearson	Hoss Ellington	Chevrolet Monte Carlo	
5	55	Benny Parsons	Leo/Richard Jackson	Chevrolet Monte Carlo	
6	7	Kyle Petty	Wood Brothers	Ford Thunderbird	
7	88	Buddy Baker	Buddy Baker/Danny Schiff	Oldsmobile Cutlass	
8	43	Richard Petty	Mike Curb	Pontiac Grand Prix	
9	15	Ricky Rudd	Bud Moore	Ford Thunderbird	
10	33	Harry Gant	Hal Needham	Chevrolet Monte Carlo	
11	1	Dick Brooks	Petty Enterprises	Ford Thunderbird	
12	66	Phil Parsons	Leo/Richard Jackson	Chevrolet Monte Carlo	
13	51	Greg Sacks	Arnie Sacks	Chevrolet Monte Carlo	
14	75	Lake Speed	RahMoc Enterprises	Pontiac Grand Prix	
15	47	Ron Bouchard	Jack Beebe	Buick Regal	
16	14	A. J. Foyt	A. J. Foyt	Oldsmobile Cutlass	
17	5	Geoff Bodine	Rick Hendrick	Chevrolet Monte Carlo	
18	3	Dale Earnhardt	Richard Childress	Chevrolet Monte Carlo	
19	12	Neil Bonnett	Junior Johnson	Chevrolet Monte Carlo	
20	95	Sterling Marlin	Sadler Brothers	Chevrolet Monte Carlo	
21	71	Dave Marcis	Dave Marcis	Chevrolet Monte Carlo	
22	2	Rusty Wallace	Cliff Stewart	Pontiac Grand Prix	
23	10	Doug Heveron	Tom Heveron	Chevrolet Monte Carlo	
24	90	Ken Schrader	Junie Donlavey	Ford Thunderbird	
25	52	Jimmy Means	Jimmy Means	Chevrolet Monte Carlo	
26	74	Bobby Wawak	Bobby Wawak	Chevrolet Monte Carlo	
27	48	Lennie Pond	James Hylton	Chevrolet Monte Carlo	
28	89	Jim Sauter	Mueller Brothers	Pontiac Grand Prix	
29	84	Mike Alexander	Sims Brothers	Chevrolet Monte Carlo	
30	0	Delma Cowart	H.L. Waters	Chevrolet Monte Carlo	
31	44	Terry Labonte	Billy Hagan	Chevrolet Monte Carlo	
32	4	Joe Ruttman	Larry McClure	Chevrolet Monte Carlo	
33	27	Tim Richmond	Raymond Beadle	Pontiac Grand Prix	
34	22	Bobby Allison	DiGard	Buick Regal	
35	98	Trevor Boys	Ron Benfield	Chevrolet Monte Carlo	
36	67	Morgan Shepherd	Buddy Arrington	Chrysler Imperial	
37	17	Ken Ragan	Roger Hamby	Chevrolet Monte Carlo	
38	8	Bobby Hillin Jr.	Stavola Brothers	Chevrolet Monte Carlo	
39	64	Clark Dwyer	Elmo Langley	Ford Thunderbird	
40	31	Slick Johnson	Henley Gray	Chevrolet Monte Carlo	

=== Failed to qualify ===
Car #	Driver	Car Make
00	Jody Ridley	Chevrolet Monte Carlo
05	Dean Roper	Ford Thunderbird
6	Eddie Bierschwale	Chevrolet Monte Carlo
06	Joe Thurman	Chevrolet Monte Carlo
07	Randy LaJoie	Chevrolet Monte Carlo
08	Craig Spetman	Chevrolet Monte Carlo
19	Bob Park	Pontiac Grand Prix
20	Rick Newsom	Chevrolet Monte Carlo
37	Satch Worley	Chevrolet Monte Carlo
41	Glenn Jarrett	Chevrolet Monte Carlo
42	Tom Sneva	Pontiac Grand Prix
53	Donny Paul	Chevrolet Monte Carlo
65	Joey Sonntag	Chevrolet Monte Carlo
70	J.D. McDuffie	Chevrolet Monte Carlo
77	Davey Allison (R)	Chevrolet Monte Carlo
79	Dick Skillen	Chevrolet Monte Carlo
82	Mark Stahl	Ford Thunderbird
99	Connie Saylor	Chevrolet Monte Carlo

== Finishing Order ==
Pos	Grid	No.	Driver	Car Make	Laps	Status	Laps led	Points
1	1	9	Bill Elliott	Ford Thunderbird	200	2:54:09	136	185 (10)
2	14	75	Lake Speed	Pontiac Grand Prix	200	+0.94 seconds	2	175 (5)
3	3	11	Darrell Waltrip	Chevrolet Monte Carlo	199	Flagged		165
4	7	88	Buddy Baker	Oldsmobile Cutlass	199	Flagged		160
5	9	15	Ricky Rudd	Ford Thunderbird	199	Flagged		155
6	13	51	Greg Sacks	Chevrolet Monte Carlo	199	Flagged	2	155 (5)
7	17	5	Geoffrey Bodine	Chevrolet Monte Carlo	198	Flagged		146
8	22	2	Rusty Wallace	Pontiac Grand Prix	197	Flagged		142
9	38	8	Bobby Hillin Jr.	Chevrolet Monte Carlo	197	Flagged		138
10	19	12	Neil Bonnett	Chevrolet Monte Carlo	195	Engine	22	139 (5)
11	24	90	Ken Schrader	Ford Thunderbird	195	Flagged		130
12	29	84	Mike Alexander	Chevrolet Monte Carlo	194	Flagged		127
13	26	74	Bobby Wawak	Chevrolet Monte Carlo	192	Flagged		124
14	25	52	Jimmy Means	Chevrolet Monte Carlo	192	Flagged		121
15	36	67	Morgan Shepherd	Chrysler Imperial	190	Flagged		118
16	20	95	Sterling Marlin	Chevrolet Monte Carlo	188	Oil pump		115
17	32	4	Joe Ruttman	Chevrolet Monte Carlo	185	Transmission		112
18	39	64	Clark Dwyer	Ford Thunderbird	182	Flagged		109
19	27	48	Lennie Pond	Chevrolet Monte Carlo	178	Crash		106
20	40	31	Slick Johnson	Chevrolet Monte Carlo	175	Flagged		103
21	37	17	Ken Ragan	Chevrolet Monte Carlo	172	Flagged		100
22	11	1	Dick Brooks	Ford Thunderbird	171	Wheel		97
23	28	89	Jim Sauter	Pontiac Grand Prix	161	Flagged		94
24	21	71	Dave Marcis	Chevrolet Monte Carlo	156	Clutch		91
25	31	44	Terry Labonte	Chevrolet Monte Carlo	154	Engine	2	93 (5)
26	10	33	Harry Gant	Chevrolet Monte Carlo	124	Engine	1	90 (5)
27	35	98	Trevor Boys	Chevrolet Monte Carlo	103	Rear end		82
28	4	21	David Pearson	Chevrolet Monte Carlo	98	Engine		79
29	12	66	Phil Parsons	Chevrolet Monte Carlo	91	Engine		76
30	16	14	A. J. Foyt	Oldsmobile Cutlass	90	Engine		73
31	5	55	Benny Parsons	Chevrolet Monte Carlo	84	Engine		70
32	18	3	Dale Earnhardt	Chevrolet Monte Carlo	84	Engine		67
33	34	22	Bobby Allison	Buick Regal	82	Engine	1	69 (5)
34	8	43	Richard Petty (W)	Pontiac Grand Prix	80	Clutch	2	66 (5)
35	33	27	Tim Richmond	Pontiac Grand Prix	66	Crash		58
36	2	28	Cale Yarborough	Ford Thunderbird	62	Engine	32	60 (5)
37	6	7	Kyle Petty	Ford Thunderbird	58	Engine		52
38	15	47	Ron Bouchard	Buick Regal	45	Camshaft		49
39	23	10	Doug Heveron	Chevrolet Monte Carlo	44	Engine		46
40	30	0	Delma Cowart	Chevrolet Monte Carlo	38	Oil leak		43

(5) Indicates 5 bonus points added to normal race points scored for leading 1 lap
(10) Indicates 10 bonus points added to normal race points scored for leading 1 lap & leading the most laps

=== Cautions ===
5 for 18 laps

From Lap	To Lap	Number of laps	Reason
72	77	6	Car #27 accident, backstretch
162	164	3	Car #71 stalled, turn 4
174	176	3	Car #1 accident, turn 2
192	194	3	Car #48 spin, frontstretch
197	199	3	Car #12 engine

=== Lap Leader Breakdown ===
Lead changes: 22

Driver	From Lap	To Lap	Number of Laps
Bill Elliott	1	2	2
Cale Yarborough	3	4	2
Bill Elliott	5	14	10
Cale Yarborough	15	24	10
Bill Elliott	25	35	11
Richard Petty	36	37	2
Greg Sacks	38	38	1
Terry Labonte	39	40	1
Cale Yarborough	41	60	20
Bill Elliott	61	72	12
Bobby Allison	73	73	1
Bill Elliott	74	107	34
Neil Bonnett	108	110	3
Harry Gant	111	111	1
Greg Sacks	112	112	1
Bill Elliott	113	144	32
Lake Speed	145	146	2
Neil Bonnett	147	154	8
Bill Elliott	155	165	11
Neil Bonnett	166	173	8
Bill Elliott	174	191	18
Neil Bonnett	192	194	3
Bill Elliott	195	200	6

== Notes ==
- This was Chrysler's last entry in the Daytona 500 as Mopar disappeared from the sport (Cup racing) completely until 2001. Morgan Shepherd drove Buddy Arrington's Chrysler's Imperial to a solid 15th place finish. Until 2016, this was the last Daytona 500 with a field of 40 cars.
- First Daytona 500 Start: Ken Schrader.
- Last Daytona 500 Starts: Bobby Wawak, Clark Dwyer, Lennie Pond, Slick Johnson, Dick Brooks, and David Pearson.

== Standings after the race ==
Pos	Driver	Points	Difference
1	Bill Elliott	185	0
2	Lake Speed	175	-10
3	Darrell Waltrip	165	-20
4	Buddy Baker	160	-25
5	Ricky Rudd	155	-30
5	Greg Sacks	155	-30
7	Geoffrey Bodine	146	-39
8	Rusty Wallace	142	-43
9	Neil Bonnett	139	-46
10	Bobby Hillin Jr.	138	-47
