= 1984 Winston 500 =

Auto race held at Talladega Superspeedway in 1984

Race details
- Race 9 of 30 in the 1984 NASCAR Winston Cup Series season
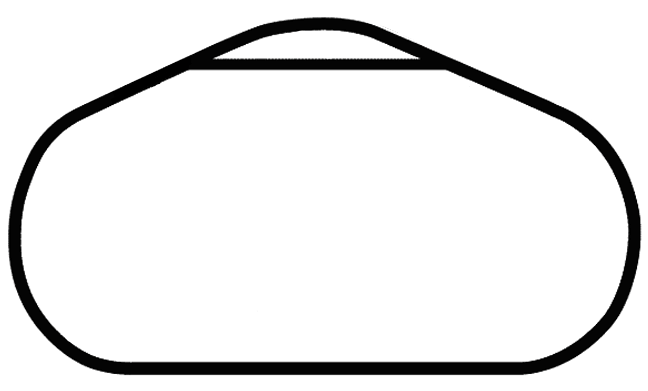
- Layout of Talladega Superspeedway
- Date: May 6, 1984
- Official name: Winston 500
- Location: Alabama International Motor Speedway, Talladega, Alabama
- Course: Permanent racing facility
- Course length: 2.660 miles (4.280 km)
- Distance: 188 laps, 500.1 mi (804.8 km)
- Weather: Very hot with temperatures of 88 °F (31 °C); wind speeds of 8.8 miles per hour (14.2 km/h)
- Average speed: 172.988 mph (278.397 km/h)
- Attendance: 115,000

Pole position
Driver	Cale Yarborough	Ranier-Lundy Racing

Most laps led
Driver	Benny Parsons	Johnny Hayes
- Laps: 56

Winner
No. 28	Cale Yarborough	Ranier-Lundy Racing

Television in the United States
- Network: NBC
- Announcers: Paul Page; Gary Gerould; Johnny Rutherford

The 1984 Winston 500 was a NASCAR Winston Cup Series racing event that took place on May 6, 1984, at Alabama International Motor Speedway in Talladega, Alabama.

== Background ==
Talladega Superspeedway, originally known as Alabama International Motor Superspeedway (AIMS), is a motorsports complex located north of Talladega, Alabama. It is located on the former Anniston Air Force Base in the small city of Lincoln. The track is a Tri-oval and was constructed by International Speedway Corporation, a business controlled by the France Family, in the 1960s. Talladega is most known for its steep banking and the unique location of the start/finish line - located just past the exit to pit road. The track currently hosts the NASCAR series such as the Monster Energy Cup Series, Xfinity Series, and the Camping World Truck Series. Talladega Superspeedway is the longest NASCAR oval with a length of 2.66 miles (4.28 km), and the track at its peak had a seating capacity of 175,000 spectators.

== Race report ==
Forty drivers competed in this 188-lap race; 39 of them were born in the United States while Trevor Boys was born in Canada. The pole position was won by Yarborough with a speed of 202.692 miles per hour (326.201 km/h); one of the times where the qualifying speed exceeded 200 miles per hour (320 km/h). This race featured 75 lead changes and laps exceeding 200 mph with unrestricted engines. The NBC TV coverage featured Bruce Jenner (now Caitlyn Jenner) as the pit reporter.

Notable crew chiefs in this race were Kenny Wallace, Junie Donlavey, Darrell Bryant, Joey Arrington, Cecil Gordon, Dale Inman, Waddell Wilson, Jake Elder, Harry Hyde, and Kirk Shelmerdine.

The average speed of the race was 172.988 miles per hour (278.397 km/h). Four cautions covered 17 laps. Chevrolet was the manufacturer for the majority of the grid. Cale Yarborough defeated Harry Gant by two car lengths after nearly three hours of racing in front of more than 110000 spectators; marking the 80th race win in Yarborough's NASCAR Winston Cup Series career. 75 lead changes occurred; the most ever in NASCAR Cup Series history.

It would exceed the record set by the 1978 Talladega 500 for the number of leader changes in the race. This record would eventually be broken at the 2010 Aaron's 499 and be tied at the 2011 Aaron's 499.

Jimmy Means suffered an oil pressure problem on the sixth lap and ended up in last place. Bill Elliott, Terry Labonte, Dale Earnhardt, Rusty Wallace, and David Pearson all took turns leading. Phil Barkdoll would make his NASCAR debut in this race.

=== Qualifying ===
Grid	No.	Driver	Manufacturer	Owner
1	28	Cale Yarborough	Chevrolet	Harry Ranier
2	9	Bill Elliott	Ford	Harry Melling
3	44	Terry Labonte	Chevrolet	Bill Hagan
4	55	Benny Parsons	Chevrolet	Johnny Hayes
5	3	Dale Earnhardt	Chevrolet	Richard Childress
6	16	David Pearson	Chevrolet	Bobby Hawkins
7	21	Buddy Baker	Ford	Wood Brothers
8	5	Geoffrey Bodine	Chevrolet	Rick Hendrick
9	11	Darrell Waltrip	Chevrolet	Junior Johnson
10	15	Ricky Rudd	Ford	Bud Moore
11	33	Harry Gant	Chevrolet	Hal Needham
12	1	Lake Speed	Chevrolet	Hoss Ellington
13	43	Richard Petty	Pontiac	Mike Curb
14	22	Bobby Allison	Buick	DiGard Racing
15	12	Neil Bonnett	Chevrolet	Junior Johnson
16	38	Phil Barkdoll	Chevrolet	Phil Barkdoll
17	17	Clark Dwyer	Chevrolet	Roger Hamby
18	8	Bobby Hillin Jr.	Chevrolet	Stavola Brothers
19	47	Ron Bouchard	Buick	Jack Beebe
20	84	Jody Ridley	Chevrolet	Robert McEntyre
21	66	Phil Parsons	Chevrolet	Johnny Hayes
22	4	Tommy Ellis	Chevrolet	Larry McClure
23	75	Dave Marcis	Pontiac	RahMoc Enterprises
24	98	Joe Ruttman	Chevrolet	Ron Benfield
25	90	Dick Brooks	Ford	Junie Donlavey

== Top 20 finishers ==
Pos	No.	Driver	Manufacturer	Laps	Laps led	Time/Status
1	28	Cale Yarborough	Chevrolet	188	19	2:53:27
2	33	Harry Gant	Chevrolet	188	14	+2 car lengths
3	21	Buddy Baker	Ford	188	43	Lead lap under green flag
4	22	Bobby Allison	Buick	188	13	Lead lap under green flag
5	55	Benny Parsons	Chevrolet	188	56	Lead lap under green flag
6	43	Richard Petty	Pontiac	187	18	+1 lap
7	66	Phil Parsons	Chevrolet	187	4	+1 lap
8	75	Dave Marcis	Pontiac	187	0	+1 lap
9	9	Bill Elliott	Ford	187	1	+1 lap
10	47	Ron Bouchard	Buick	186	3	+2 laps
11	8	Bobby Hillin Jr.	Chevrolet	186	0	+2 laps
12	95	Sterling Marlin	Chevrolet	186	0	+2 laps
13	4	Tommy Ellis	Chevrolet	185	0	+3 laps
14	51	Greg Sacks	Chevrolet	185	0	+3 laps
15	7	Kyle Petty	Ford	184	0	+4 laps
16	84	Jody Ridley	Chevrolet	182	0	+6 laps
17	71	Mike Alexander	Oldsmobile	181	0	+7 laps
18	48	Trevor Boys	Chevrolet	179	0	+9 laps
19	64	Tommy Gale	Ford	177	0	+11 laps
20	41	Ronnie Thomas	Chevrolet	177	0	+11 laps

== Standings after the race ==
Pos	Driver	Points	Differential
1	Darrell Waltrip	1357	0
2 ▲	Bill Elliott	1328	-29
3 ▼	Terry Labonte	1327	-30
4 ▼	Dale Earnhardt	1299	-58
5 ▼	Ricky Rudd	1293	-64
6	Harry Gant	1266	-91
7	Richard Petty	1215	-142
8	Neil Bonnett	1129	-228
9	Bobby Allison	1125	-232
10	Ron Bouchard	1122	-235

Preceded by 1984 Sovran Bank 500	NASCAR Winston Cup Series Season; 1984	Succeeded by 1984 Coors 420

Preceded by 1983	Winston 500 races 1984	Succeeded by 1985
