= 1984 World 600 =

Auto race held at Charlotte Motor Speedway in 1984

Race details
- Race 12 of 30 in the 1984 NASCAR Winston Cup Series season
- Layout of Charlotte Motor Speedway
- Date: May 27, 1984
- Official name: World 600
- Location: Charlotte Motor Speedway, Concord, North Carolina
- Course: Permanent racing facility
- Course length: 1.500 miles (2.414 km)
- Distance: 400 laps, 600 mi (965 km)
- Weather: Very hot with temperatures of 87.1 °F (30.6 °C); wind speeds of 11.1 miles per hour (17.9 km/h)
- Average speed: 129.707 miles per hour (208.743 km/h)
- Attendance: 149,000

Pole position
Driver	Harry Gant	Mach 1 Racing

Most laps led
Driver	Bobby Allison	DiGard Motorsports
- Laps: 156

Winner
No. 22	Bobby Allison	DiGard Motorsports

Television in the United States
- Network: Mizlou
- Announcers: Mike Joy; Donnie Allison

The 1984 World 600, the 25th running of the event, was a NASCAR Winston Cup Series racing event that took place on May 27, 1984. A souvenir program from this race cost $4 ($12.4 when adjusted for inflation).

== Background ==
Charlotte Motor Speedway was designed and built by Bruton Smith and partner and driver Curtis Turner in 1959. The first World 600 NASCAR race was held at the 1.5 mi (2.4 km) speedway on June 19, 1960. On December 8, 1961, the speedway filed bankruptcy notice. Judge J.B. Craven of US District Court for Western North Carolina reorganized it under Chapter 10 of the Bankruptcy Act; Judge Craven appointed Robert "Red" Robinson as the track's trustee until March 1962. At that point, a committee of major stockholders in the speedway was assembled, headed by A.C. Goines and furniture store owner Richard Howard. Goines, Howard, and Robinson worked to secure loans and other monies to keep the speedway afloat.

By April 1963 some $750,000 was paid to twenty secured creditors and the track emerged from bankruptcy; Judge Craven appointed Goines as speedway president and Howard as assistant general manager of the speedway, handling its day-to-day operations. By 1964 Howard become the track's general manager, and on June 1, 1967, the speedway's mortgage was paid in full; a public burning of the mortgage was held at the speedway two weeks later.

Smith departed from the speedway in 1962 to pursue other business interests, primarily in banking and auto dealerships from his new home of Rockford, IL. He became quite successful and began buying out shares of stock in the speedway. By 1974 Smith was more heavily involved in the speedway, to where Richard Howard by 1975 stated, "I haven't been running the speedway. It's being run from Illinois." In 1975 Smith had become the majority stockholder, regaining control of its day-to-day operations. Smith hired H.A. "Humpy" Wheeler as general manager in October 1975, and on January 29, 1976, Richard Howard resigned as president and GM of the speedway.

== Race report ==
The actor Burt Young (Paulie from the popular Rocky film series) was the official starter. There were 42 drivers on the grid; Benny Parsons received the last-place finish due to an ignition issue on the sixth lap out of the 400. Racing legend David Pearson was the lowest earner in this race, making $800 for his ninth-place finish. The next lowest earner was Doug Heveron, who was paid $1,275 for being 248 laps behind in 40th.

Trevor Boys was the only driver not American-born. Notable drivers that competed included: Terry Labonte, Sterling Marlin, Bill Elliott, Darrell Waltrip, Cale Yarborough, and Rusty Wallace. Harry Gant would earn the pole position for this race with a speed of 162.496 miles per hour (261.512 km/h). Nearly 150000 fans would see Bobby Allison defeat Dale Earnhardt after five caution periods; marking the last win for the G-body Buick Regal in a NASCAR Winston Cup Series race. The entire race lasted more than four and a half hours. Twenty-two different changes in the first-place position were observed during the race.

There was rain between lap 248 and 256 which was caused by a cold front which attempted to simmer down the very hot temperatures during the race; it subsided until lap 281. There WERE officially 48 caution laps during the race; with most of them being caused by accidents and engine failures caused by the constant pressures of high-speed racing.

Kyle Petty and his father Richard also competed at this race. The younger Petty charged from 41st starting position to seventh in the races first 100 miles but dropped out on lap 193 due to a blown engine. Senator Jesse Helms was a genuine fan of Richard Petty and had the opportunity to meet him during the event.

Allison would end up in a slump and not win another race until the 1986 Winston 500 at Alabama International Motor Speedway in Talladega, Alabama.

=== Top 10 finishers ===
Pos	Grid	No.	Driver	Manufacturer	Laps	Laps led	Points	Time/Status
1	16	22	Bobby Allison	Buick	400	156	185	4:38:34
2	19	3	Dale Earnhardt	Chevrolet	400	91	175	+17 seconds
3	18	47	Ron Bouchard	Buick	399	0	165	+1 lap
4	1	33	Harry Gant	Chevrolet	399	1	165	+1 lap
5	13	5	Geoffrey Bodine	Chevrolet	399	0	155	+1 lap
6	17	1	Lake Speed	Chevrolet	398	0	150	+2 laps
7	6	21	Buddy Baker	Ford	398	0	146	+2 laps
8	3	84	Jody Ridley	Chevrolet	398	0	142	+2 laps
9	5	16	David Pearson	Chevrolet	397	0	138	+3 laps
10	21	27	Tim Richmond	Pontiac	396	0	134	+4 laps

== Standings after the race ==
Pos	Driver	Points	Differential
1	Darrell Waltrip	1777	0
2 ▲	Dale Earnhardt	1735	-42
3	Ricky Rudd	1730	-47
4 ▼	Terry Labonte	1712	-65
5 ▼	Bill Elliott	1675	-102
6 ▲	Harry Gant	1638	-139
7 ▼	Richard Petty	1607	-170
8 ▲	Ron Bouchard	1580	-197
9 ▲	Bobby Allison	1569	-208
10 ▼	Neil Bonnett	1554	-223

Preceded by 1984 Budweiser 500	NASCAR Winston Cup Series races 1984	Succeeded by 1984 Budweiser 400

Preceded by 1983	World 600 races 1984	Succeeded by none
