= Dale Inman =

NASCAR crew chief

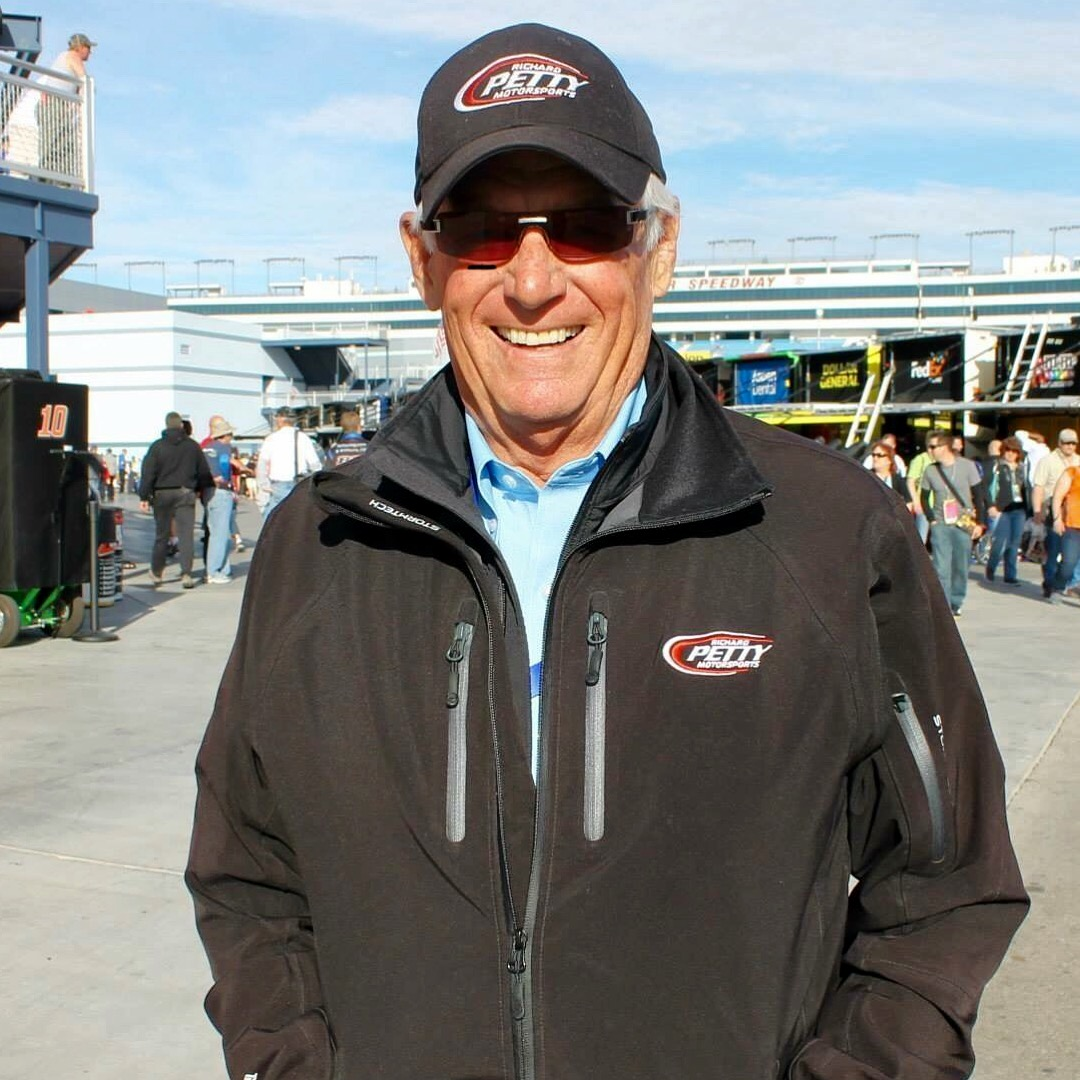
- Inman at Las Vegas Motor Speedway in 2014

Personal information
- Born: August 19, 1936 (age 89) Level Cross, North Carolina, U.S.
- Home town: Level Cross, North Carolina, U.S.
- Occupation: Crew chief
- Years active: 1950s–1998
- Employer(s): Petty Enterprises; Hagan Racing
- Spouse: Mary
- Children: 2
- Relative(s): Richard Petty (second cousin); Maurice Petty (second cousin)

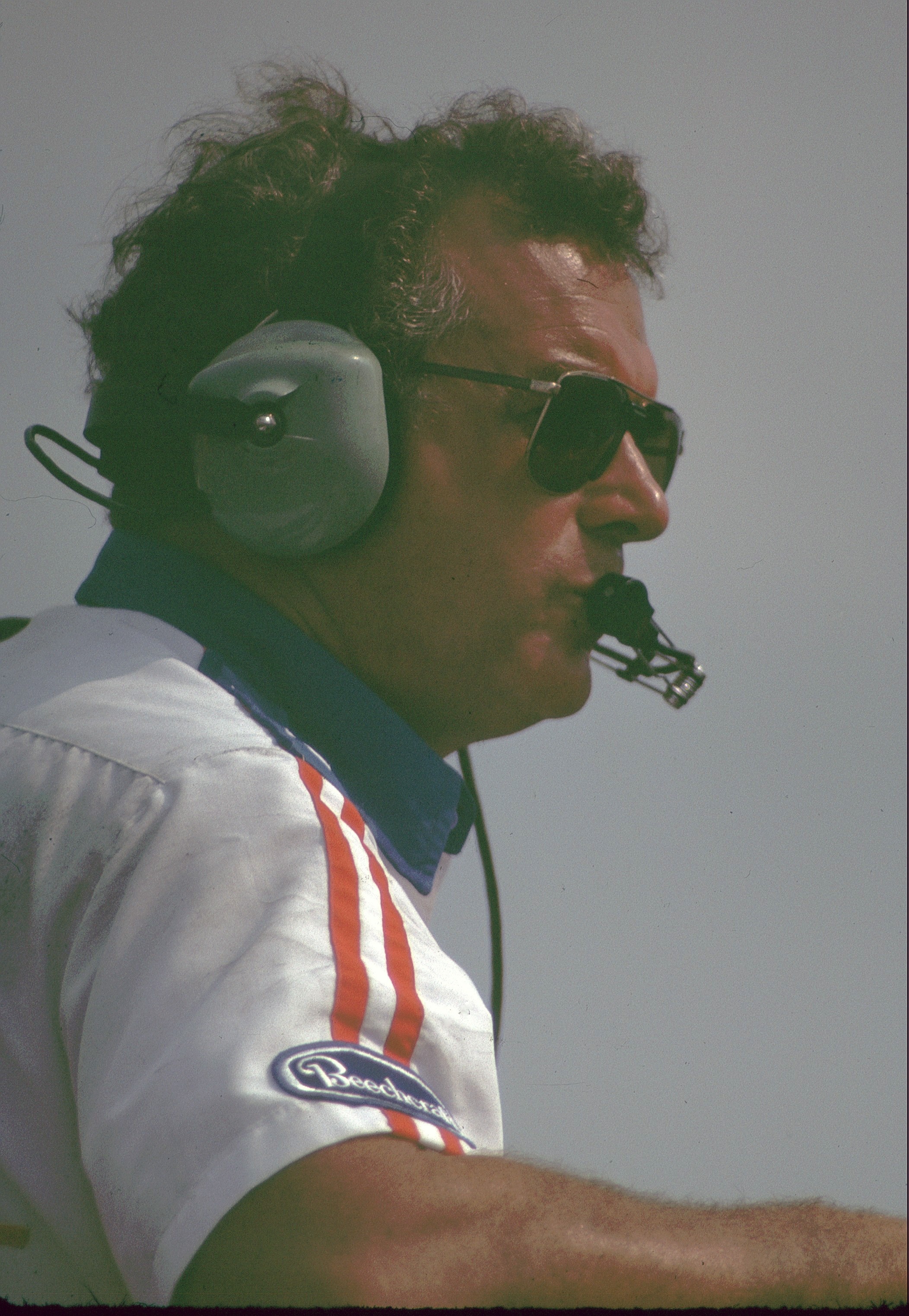
Inman in the pits

Dale Inman (born August 19, 1936) is a retired NASCAR Grand National/Winston Cup Series crew chief. He is best known for being the crew chief of Richard Petty at Petty Enterprises during three decades. They won 188 races and seven championships together (1964, 1967, 1971, 1972, 1974, 1975, and 1979). Inman spent most of his career working for Petty Enterprises. He also was the crew chief for Terry Labonte's 1984 championship with Hagan Racing. NASCAR.com contributor Rick Houston said that if the best crew chief was "settled on statistics and statistics alone, Dale Inman is the greatest crew chief of all time." He is credited for starting the main duties of the position, including preparation, and driver-pit communication. Inman has the most victories as a NASCAR crew chief at 193, 188 of which were with Richard Petty. Inman won five additional races from 1982 to 1984 with Tim Richmond and Terry Labonte.

== Career ==
Inman grew up playing with his second cousins Richard and Maurice Petty. The Petty brothers were the son of Lee Petty, who finished in the Top 5 points in NASCAR's stock car division every year from its formation in 1949 until 1959 and won the 1954, 1958, and 1959 championships. The teenage boys would attend some races and work on Lee's car after school and on weekends. Richard started racing in the late 1950s with Maurice and Inman as part of his pit crew, as they were too young to be his crew chief. In 1960, Petty won his first NASCAR race. By this time, Maurice and Inman had become NASCAR mechanics. Maurice had been the mechanic and crew chief at the races. Petty Enterprises had him start concentrating on engine building for the team, and Inman became the crew chief at the races. Petty described him as the sport's first official crew chief.

In 1967, Petty won a NASCAR-record ten straight races and 27 races during that season with Inman as his crew chief. All 27 victories were in the same car that they built in 1966. He departed the team days after winning the 1981 Daytona 500. While being interviewed after winning the race, he told CBS reporter Ned Jarrett that he would soon be leaving the team. Inman had been crew chief for 188 of Petty's 193 victories up to that point.

Inman was hired by Rod Osterlund to be the crew chief for 1980 champion Dale Earnhardt. That June, Osterlund sold the team to J. D. Stacy and Earnhardt quit Stacy's team in August. He stayed with the team and was the crew chief for Joe Ruttman and Tim Richmond, winning two races with Richmond in 1982. For 1983 and 1984, he was hired by Billy Hagan to join Terry Labonte's team. They combined to win three races and the 1984 championship.

Inman returned to Petty Enterprises in 1986 to oversee the business side. In an interview, he said, "This is my homecoming and this is where I belong. Damn, I am happy." He served as Petty’s crew chief for three more seasons (1986–1988) and continued in his role helping Richard Petty until Petty retired in 1992. After his retirement, Inman helped Petty Enterprises drivers Rick Wilson, John Andretti, and Bobby Hamilton.

Inman retired from NASCAR in 1998, having won 193 races and eight championships. He continued as a consultant for Petty Enterprises for a while afterward. Away from racing, Inman has helped the Victory Junction Gang Camp get started. In 2008, he helped unveil the first artifact at the NASCAR Hall of Fame, which was the Plymouth Belvedere that Petty drove to 27 wins in 1967.

== Awards ==
In 2006, a national motorsports media group poll named Ray Evernham as the top NASCAR crew chief of all-time and Inman placed a close second even though he had more first place votes than Evernham. When asked, Inman said, "I'm not even sure I should be ranked. I think I was second [in the poll], and I'm honored [for] that." He said that the best crew chief that he ever saw was Leonard Wood from the Wood Brothers and Waddell Wilson was also good.

Inman's contributions to racing led to him receiving the North Carolina Auto Racing Hall of Fame's first Golden Wrench award on May 25, 2000. In 2008, he was received the Smokey Yunick Award.

On June 14, 2011, Inman was selected to the 2012 class of the NASCAR Hall of Fame.

== Personal life ==
As of 2000, Inman was married to his wife Mary for over 40 years. They had two children, and four grandchildren.
