= Darrell Bryant =

Racecar driver from North Carolina

- Born: October 6, 1940 (age 86); Thomasville, North Carolina, U.S.

NASCAR Cup Series career
- 18 races run over 4 years
- Best finish: 47th - 1976 NASCAR Winston Cup Series season
- First race: 1964 Volunteer 500 (Bristol International Speedway)
- Last race: 1976 Southern 500 (Darlington Raceway)
Wins	Top tens	Poles
0	2	0

Darrell Bryant (born October 6, 1940) is an American former NASCAR Winston Cup Series driver whose claim to fame was his two "top-ten" finishes in addition to racing 2389 laps - for a distance of 2,489.9 miles (4,007.1 km). Bryant has driven for Chevrolet, Dodge, Oldsmobile, and Mercury during his driving career.

== Career ==
Bryant's average start was 24th place while his average finish is 25th. Earning only $14,075 in total race winnings ($79,634.87 when inflation is taken into effect), Bryant would not become one of the multimillionaires that are present in today's NASCAR. Wade Younts, Curtis Crider, and Buddy Arrington were a few of the people who employed Bryant during his NASCAR Grand National Series career. Bryant's ultimate retirement from motorsports as a driver came on September 6, 1976 when he finished an agonizing 40th place the 1976 Southern 500 in Darlington, South Carolina driving for former NASCAR team owner Cliff Stewart.

Bryant would later become a crew chief and lead drivers like Terry Labonte and Lake Speed to race victories during the 1980s. Bryant's most recent NASCAR-related job was being the crew chief of the late Tony Roper during the 2000 NASCAR Busch Series season. After Roper died from a severe neck injury sustained from a racing crash in his No. 50 Chevrolet Monte Carlo machine, Bryant has never worked in NASCAR ever again.
