= Morgan Shepherd =

American racing driver (born 1941)

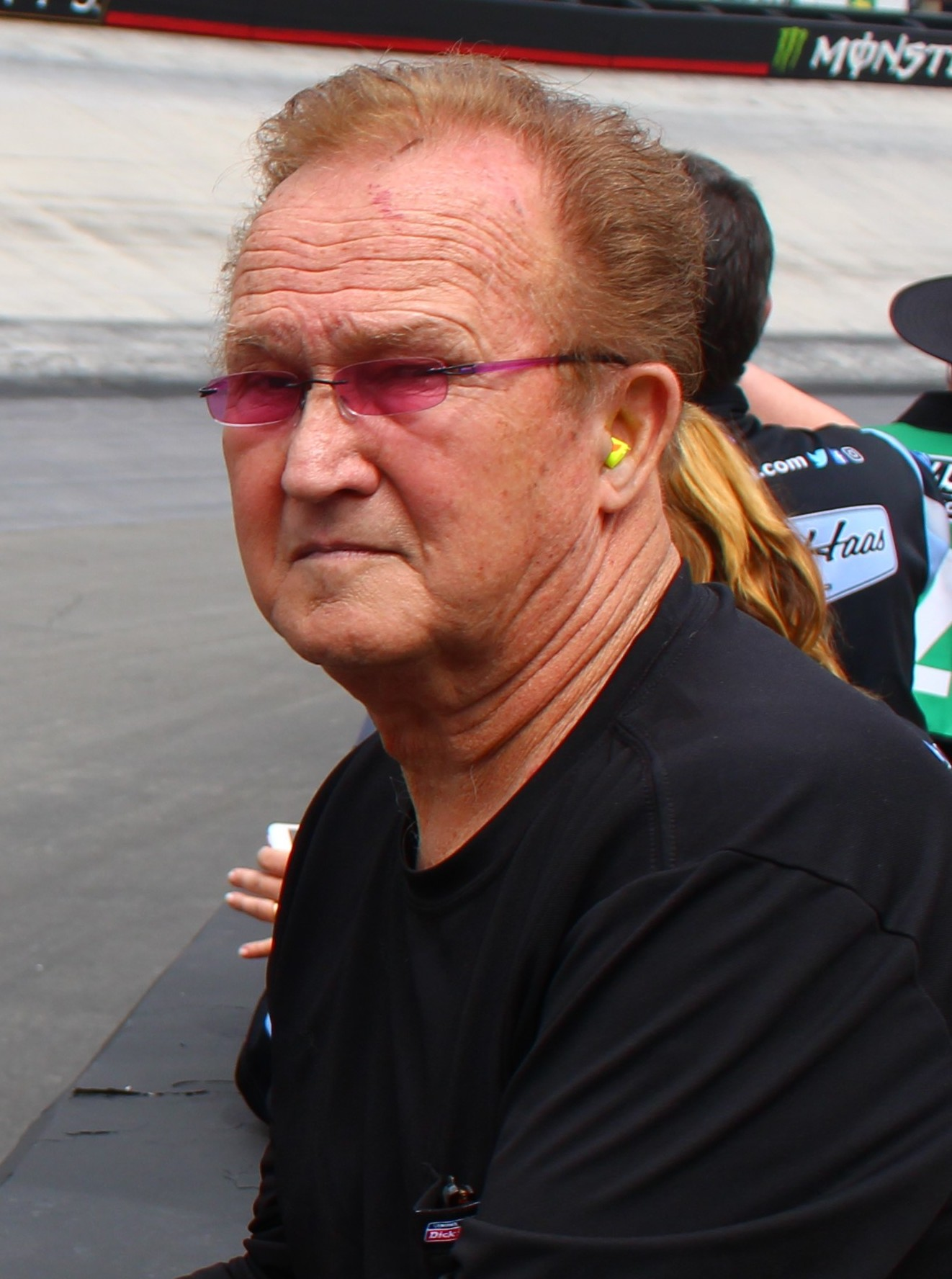
- Shepherd at Bristol Motor Speedway in 2019
- Born: Clay Morgan Shepherd; October 12, 1941 (age 85); Ferguson, North Carolina, U.S.
- Achievements: 1980 NASCAR Late Model Sportsman Division Champion; Oldest driver to start a NASCAR Cup Series race (72 years, 9 months, and 1 day)
- Awards: 2005 NMPA Man of the Year

NASCAR Cup Series career
- 517 races run over 29 years
- 2014 position: 72nd
- Best finish: 5th (1990)
- First race: 1970 Hickory 276 (Hickory)
- Last race: 2014 Camping World RV Sales 301 (New Hampshire)
- First win: 1981 Virginia 500 (Martinsville)
- Last win: 1993 Motorcraft Quality Parts 500 (Atlanta)
Wins	Top tens	Poles
4	168	7

NASCAR O'Reilly Auto Parts Series career
- 453 races run over 33 years
- 2019 position: 61st
- Best finish: 11th (1982)
- First race: 1982 Mountain Dew 300 (Hickory)
- Last race: 2019 Indiana 250 (Indianapolis)
- First win: 1982 Sunkist 200 (Hickory)
- Last win: 1988 Kroger 200 (IRP)
Wins	Top tens	Poles
15	67	6

NASCAR FedEx Freight Truck Series career
- 57 races run over 8 years
- 2015 position: 102nd
- Best finish: 24th (2002)
- First race: 1997 NAPA Autocare 200 (Nazareth)
- Last race: 2015 Hyundai Construction Equipment 200 (Atlanta)
Wins	Top tens	Poles
0	0	0
- Statistics up to date as of November 18, 2019.

Clay Morgan Shepherd (born October 12, 1941) is an American former professional stock car racing driver and team owner. He last competed part-time in the NASCAR Xfinity Series, driving the No. 89 Chevrolet Camaro for Shepherd Racing Ventures. He is a born again Christian who serves as a lay minister to the racing community. He competed in NASCAR for over 50 years, having one of the longest careers in the sport.

Shepherd became the second-oldest race winner (after Harry Gant) in 1993, when he won the spring race at Atlanta at the age of 51 years, four months, and 27 days. He holds the record for oldest driver to start a race in NASCAR's top three series at age 77, as well as oldest starter in the NASCAR Cup Series race at the 2014 Camping World RV Sales 301 at age 72.

== Racing career ==
=== Career before NASCAR ===
Shepherd's racing career began in 1967 when he started racing Late models at Hickory Motor Speedway nearby his home. Shepherd proved to be fast but he crashed out quite often in his early days. In 1968, Shepherd started racing full-time at a Hobby division in Hickory, driving a 1955 Chevy. In 1969, Shepherd won 21 out of 29 races. Shepherd drove the same car this time with a 1957 Chevy body on the car. After winning seven races early in the year he wrecked, which almost destroyed his car. Shepherd did not win another race that year after putting a 1966 Chevy body on the car. Shepherd later sold this car to Harry Gant.

Shepherd's career was on its way in 1970. He built his own cars and raced at several different racetracks in the Southeast. Personal problems during the seventies slowed down Shepherd's career. In a religious experience, Shepherd accepted Christ as his personal savior. He was looking to get control of his life, and his career got back on track in 1975. Shepherd took every racing opportunity he was offered and drove for seventeen different car owners during 1975. He finished second in the NASCAR Sportsman national championship to L. D. Ottinger. At last, Shepherd got his big break in 1978 after he met Cliff Stewart, who owned a western North Carolina furniture factory. With Stewart as his owner, Shepherd won the 1980 NASCAR Sportsman Series (now known as the O'Reilly Auto Parts Series). During this year, Shepherd won nine races and finished second 21 times. The Shepherd-Stewart combo moved to what was then the Winston Cup Series for the 1981 season.

=== Winston Cup Series ===
==== Early days ====
Shepherd made his Winston Cup Series debut in 1970 at Hickory Motor Speedway, driving the No. 93 Chevy for Bill Flowers. He started tenth but finished nineteenth out of twenty-two cars due to rear-end failure. Shepherd made two more starts for Flowers that year but failed to finish in both of them. His best finish that year was a fourteenth place at Hickory.

Shepherd would not return to the Cup Series until 1977, driving a Mercury for Jim Makar. He first attempted the Daytona 500 that year but he failed to make the race. Later that year Shepherd took his first top-ten finish at Dover International Speedway. He also ran two additional races at Charlotte Motor Speedway and Atlanta Motor Speedway. Shepherd stayed with Makar for the 1978 season, qualifying for his first Daytona 500. Shepherd started the race in 37th place but only finished 40th when his engine failed after only eight laps. He only ran one additional race that season, finishing twelfth at Charlotte. Shepherd only attempted the Daytona 500 with Makar in 1979, but failed to make the race.

==== Full-time Cup Series switch ====
Shepherd moved to the Winston Cup Series full-time in 1981, driving the No. 5 Pontiac for Cliff Stewart. They missed the first two races of the season, Riverside and the Daytona 500. Shepherd took pole position in his first race for Stewart at Richmond, finishing the race in fourth position. A few races later, Shepherd won his first Winston Cup race at Martinsville. The win marked the first win for Pontiac in eighteen years. Shepherd dominated the race and led a total of 203 laps. Shepherd left Stewart's team after the Talladega 500 after he had a falling out with his team. For the next race at Michigan, Shepherd drove for Bud Reeder his team. Shepherd qualified in the fourteenth position but retired from the race after he crashed on lap twenty. For the next couple of races, Shepherd drove for Cecil Gordon and his team, finishing in the top-ten at North Wilkesboro and Charlotte. During the last part of the season, Shepherd also drove some races for Ron Benfield. Shepherd finished thirteenth in points with ten top-ten finishes.

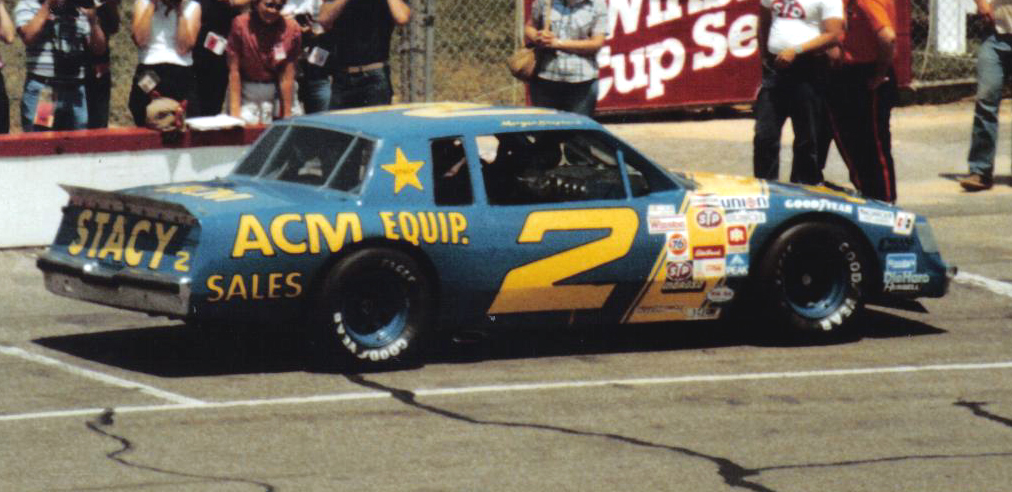
Driving for Jim Stacy in 1983.

Shepherd moved to Benfield's team full-time in 1982, driving the No. 98 Buick. Although Shepherd did not win a race that season, he scored six top-five finishes with a best finish of third at Bristol early in the season. Shepherd also won the pole at Nashville and Atlanta, respectively, but retired from both those races with engine troubles. Shepherd finished tenth in points that season with a total of thirteen top-ten finishes.

Shepherd started the 1983 season without a full-time ride. He tried to qualify for the Daytona 500 driving for Bud Reeder; however, he failed to make the race. Shepherd then drove the Richmond 400 for Wayne Beahr but did not finish the race. Shepherd returned to Cecil Gordon for the TranSouth 500 and later drove the Virginia National Bank 500 for Emanuel Zervakis. After that race, Shepherd drove for Jim Stacy's team for the rest of the season. Shepherd scored thirteen top-ten finishes during the rest of the season, with a best finish of second at Firecracker 400. His abbreviated season dropped Shepherd to twentieth in the final points standings.

==== Going from ride to ride ====
For the next couple of years, Shepherd did not have a full-time ride and practically picked up whatever he could find. Shepherd started off his 1984 season at Richmond driving the No. 2 Buick for Robert Harrington. Shepherd drove two races for Charlie Henderson early in the season. He also drove four races for Dick Bahre his team, with a best finish of seventeenth at the 1984 World 600. Shepherd made one start for Phil Barkdoll at Michigan finishing the race in the 22nd position. After driving the No. 6 Buick for D. K. Ulrich and the No. 52 Chevy for Jimmy Means, Shepherd drove six races for Roger Hamby. Shepherd had two top twenty finished for Hamby, with a best finish of twelfth at Richmond. Shepherd made another start for Ulrich at Charlotte, before rounding off the season driving the No. 98 Chevy for Ron Benfield. Shepherd scored his only top ten finish that season at Rockingham, finishing in sixth position.

Shepherd finished his first Daytona 500 in 1985, driving the No. 67 Chrysler for Buddy Arrington. Shepherd spent the rest of the season going from ride to ride. He returned to the team of Dick Bahre, driving the No. 23 Chevy at Rockingham. He also made a start for Petty Enterprises at the TranSouth 500. Shepherd fielded his own car at Talladega, finishing the race in thirteenth place. Shepherd made four races for Bobby Hawkins, with a best finish of fifth at Atlanta. He made most of his starts that season for Helen Rae Smith, but failed to finish all of those seven races.

Shepherd moved to the team of Jack Beebe in 1986, driving on a part-time basis. He had a good start to the season, finishing fourth at the 1986 Goodwrench 500. At the next race in Atlanta, Shepherd led 97 laps and held off Dale Earnhardt to win his second career Winston Cup race. Shepherd got very emotional at the final laps of the race. "I was trying not to cry. I knew I had to keep my self-control because we were so close to finally winning a big one, a major race. My racing career was nearly gone just a year before, and I was getting ready to win a big one." Shepherd made ten more starts for Beebe that season, scoring four top-ten finishes. After making several starts for RahMoc Enterprises mid-season, he moved to the team full-time after the Southern 500. Shepherd scored two additional top-ten finishes for RahMoc Enterprises and finished the season eighteenth in points.

==== Late 1980s and early 1990s ====
Shepherd joined King Racing for the 1987 season, driving the No. 26 Quaker State Buick Lesabre owned by drag racing legend Kenny Bernstein. It was the first time in Shepherd's Cup career that he competed in every scheduled event. Shepherd scored eleven top-ten finishes; seven of those were in the top five. He also scored his fourth career pole at Martinsville. He led the early part of that race but retired after engine problems. His best finish of the season was at the Coca-Cola 600, where Shepherd finished second to Kyle Petty.

Shepherd switched to Tom Winkle's team for the 1988 season. Shepherd had a good start to the season, with a pole at Richmond and a top-ten at Rockingham. However, after that race Shepherd started racing for his own team, driving a Buick. After failing to finish a race with his own team he moved to Mach 1 Racing, replacing the injured Harry Gant. Shepherd led 110 laps at Dover, eventually finishing second to Bill Elliott. After Gant returned Shepherd again replaced an injured driver, this time Neil Bonnett at RahMoc Enterprises. In his first race for this team, at Pocono, Shepherd took his second pole of the year. After posting two top-tens in the No. 88 Oldsmobile for Buddy Baker, Shepherd finished out the year in his own No. 57, before his team was purchased by RahMoc for the season finale. Shepherd competed in the 1988 NASCAR Christmas 500 at the Calder Park Thunderdome in Australia, starting second and scoring the win by four seconds over Sterling Marlin, the only other car on the lead lap.

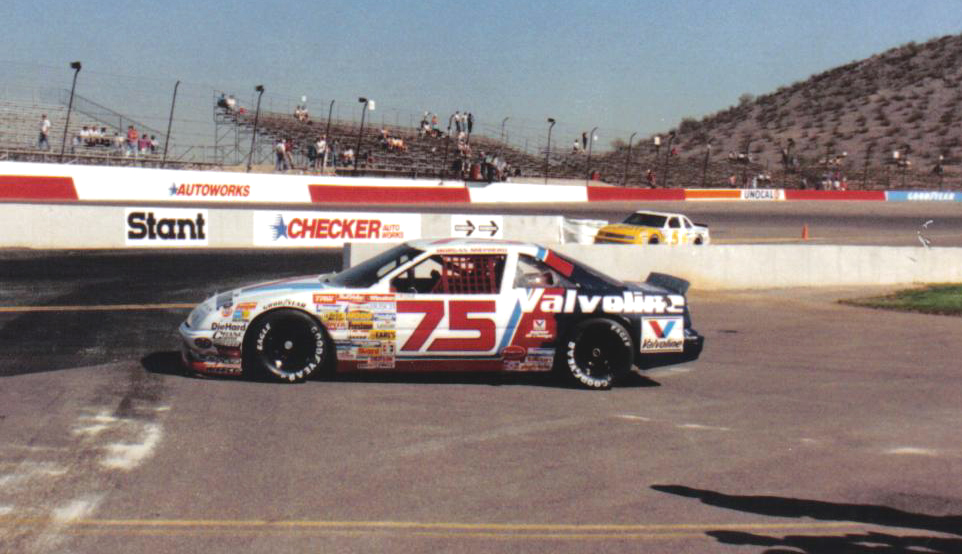
Shepherd driving for RahMoc Enterprises during the 1989 season.

Shepherd returned to RahMoc for the 1989 season. Shepherd scored thirteen top-ten finishes during the season. He led the most laps at the Talladega DieHard 500 but eventually finished the race in sixth place. Shepherd took his final career pole at Watkins Glen. He led the early parts of that race but lost his chance of winning the race after contact with Geoff Bodine. Shepherd's best finish of the season was two second-place finishes at the Pepsi 400 and the Champion Spark Plug 400. It was only the second time in his career Shepherd competed in every scheduled event. He finished thirteenth in the final points standings.

Shepherd moved to Bud Moore Engineering for the 1990 season, driving the No. 15 Ford. He had a great start to the season finishing in the top ten in each of the first eleven races. Shepherd took the championship lead for the first (and only) time in his career after the Budweiser 500. He had a difficult midseason, losing the points lead and dropping to tenth in the standings after the Tyson Holly Farms 400. Shepherd ended his season on a high after winning his third career race at the season finale at Atlanta. He finished fifth in the final points standings, which would turn out to be a career-high.

Shepherd stayed with Bud Moore for the 1991 season, but had a more up and down season than the year before. Although he scored fourteen top-ten finishes, he could not compete for regular top-five finishes during the season. His best finish of the season was two third-place finishes late in the season. He had his best run of the season at North Wilkesboro, where Shepherd led a total of 41 laps and just missed out on the win. Shepherd dropped to twelfth in the final points standings. After the season Shepherd left Bud Moore Engineering and moved to the Wood Brothers for the 1992 season.

==== Wood Brothers Racing ====
Shepherd joined Wood Brothers Racing in 1992, driving the No. 21 Citgo Ford. He came short of winning the Daytona 500, finishing second to Davey Allison. Even though Shepherd scored eleven top-ten finishes during the season he dropped to fourteenth in the final points standings. Shepherd had a good run at Dover early in the season, where he led 52 laps, but he dropped back at the end of the race.

"Morgan's a much better driver than he gets credit for," says famed car owner Leonard Wood. "I thought he did a great job for us. The thing about him was the longer the race went green the better he looked. He was tough. And he was a great chassis (setup) guy."

— Leonard Wood, speaking about Shepherd.

Shepherd improved to seventh in points in 1993. Shepherd scored a total of fifteen top-ten finishes during the season. He became the second-oldest race winner when he won the spring race at Atlanta at the age of 51 years, four months, and 27 days. Shepherd took the race lead with twelve laps to go and cruised across the finish line. It turned out to be Shepherd's final Winston Cup Series win. The Wood Brothers would not return to Victory Lane until Elliott Sadler won the Food City 500 in 2001.

Shepherd continued his good run for the Wood Brothers in 1994. He equaled his career-best top-tens in one season with sixteen, nine of those were top-five finishes. Shepherd came close to winning his fourth race at Atlanta, but just came short and finished second to Ernie Irvan. Shepherd also came close to winning the Mello Yello 500 at the end of the season but was passed by Dale Jarrett during the last four laps of the race. Shepherd finished sixth in the final points standings with a career-best 4029 points in a season.

Shepherd stayed with the Wood Brothers for the 1995 season. He had a decent season but dropped to eleventh in the points standings. Shepherd scored ten top-ten finishes during the season. He had his best run at Loudon, where Shepherd finished second to Jeff Gordon. After the 1995 season, Shepherd was replaced by Michael Waltrip, as Citgo wanted a younger driver. At that time Shepherd was 53 years old.

==== Late 1990s and career decline ====
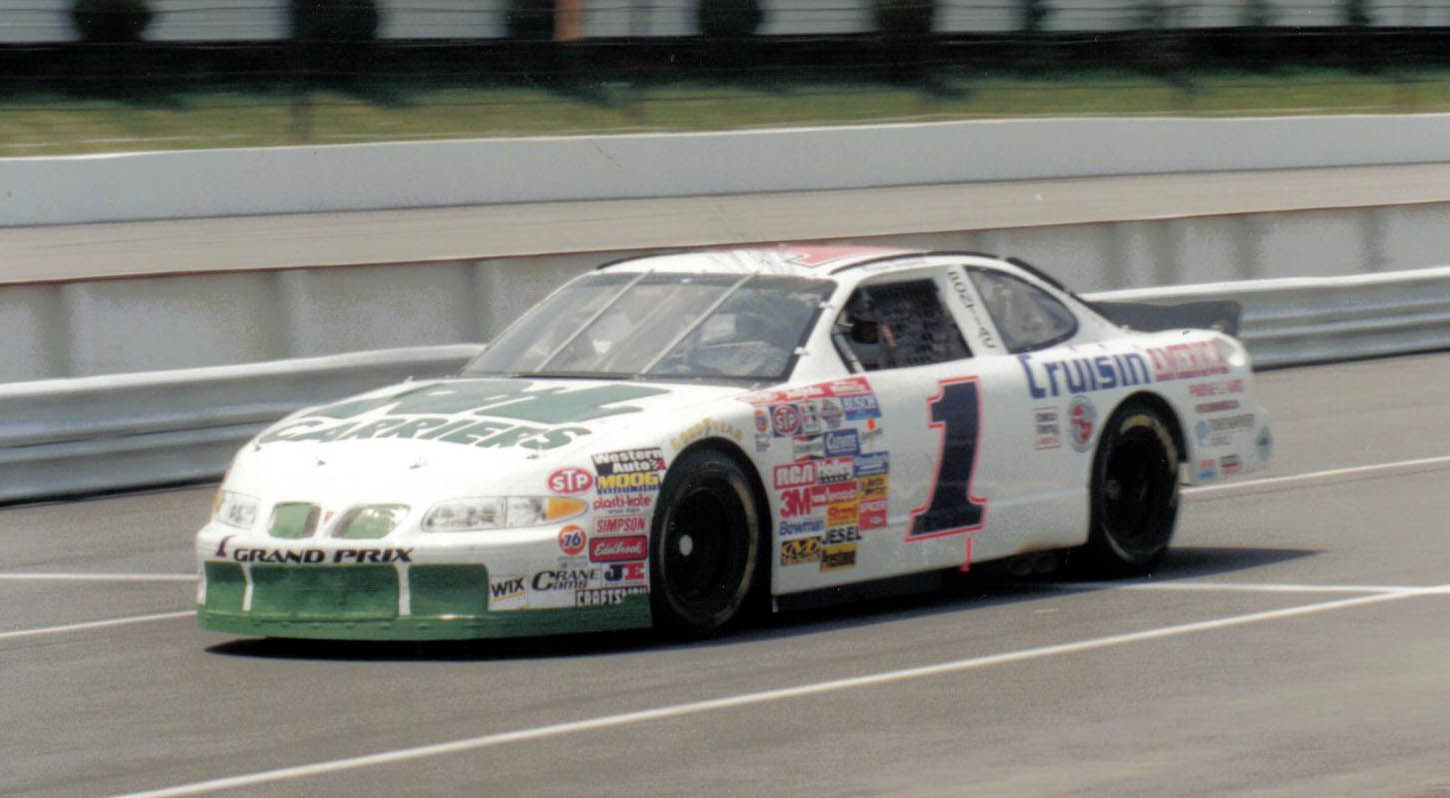
1997 R+L Carriers car.

Shepherd signed for Butch Mock Motorsports to drive for them in the 1996 season, driving their No. 75 Ford with sponsorship from Remington Arms. Shepherd scored five top-tens during the season, with a best finish of fifth at the Brickyard 400. He also had a good run going at the Miller 400, where Shepherd led 44 laps in the early part of the race. Shepherd finished nineteenth in the final points standings. Despite a solid season, Shepherd decided to leave the No. 75 team at the end of the season. 1996 would also turn out to be Shepherd's last season where he competed in every scheduled event.

Shepherd moved to Precision Products Racing for the 1997 season, driving the No. 1 Pontiac. Shepherd finished tenth at the Goodwrench Service 400, scoring his first top-ten of the year. He had his best run of the season in Atlanta. Shepherd looked strong all race and was a contender for the win, but eventually he finished the race in third place. This was Shepherd's last top-five finish in Winston Cup competition. Shepherd finished ninth at the Coca-Cola 600. This would turn out to be Shepherd's last top ten finish in Cup racing. After the Pocono 500, Shepherd left Precision Products Racing and switched to Jasper Motorsports, driving their No. 77 Ford. Shepherd struggled at Jasper Motorsports and only managed to qualify for five of the eleven races he entered with the team. After failing to qualify for the Exide NASCAR Select Batteries 400, he departed and rejoined PPR, now with R+L Carriers sponsorship. His best finish for the rest of the season was a twelfth place at Talladega Superspeedway.

After beginning 1998 without a ride, Shepherd brought out his own team to attempt the races at Rockingham, Atlanta and Darlington, but his No. 05 Pontiac failed to qualify in all three races. In the following race at Bristol, Shepherd drove the No. 46 First Union Chevy for Team SABCO, finishing 24th, before substituting for Mike Skinner for two races, finishing eleventh at Martinsville. Shepherd also had a good run at Talladega, where he qualified in fifth place. After another race for SABCO and a one-off deal for Stavola Brothers Racing at Michigan International Speedway, where he finished 43rd, Shepherd spent most of the season with LJ Racing, his best finish fifteenth at the Brickyard 400. He left the team late in the season and closed the year in the No. 8 Chevy for the Stavola Brothers. Shepherd had a good run and was running in the top ten, until he made contact with Jeff Gordon and wrecked, finishing 39th.

Shepherd attempted the 1999 Daytona 500 for Pinnacle Motorsports, but he failed to make the race. He made his only Cup start that season the following week at North Carolina in the No. 90 Ford Taurus for Donlavey Racing, where he started 39th and finished 32nd, five laps down. In May 1999, Shepherd announced he was partnering with Rhea Fain to field the No. 05 Wendy's Pontiac. After the team failed to qualify for the Coca-Cola 600, the partnership dissolved, and Shepherd failed in each of his attempts to qualify for a Cup race that season.

Shepherd only attempted one race in 2000, driving the No. 80 Ford for Hover Motorsports in the season finale at Atlanta. He failed to make the race as Shepherd set the 49th-fastest time in qualifying. Shepherd returned to Hover Motorsports for the 2001 Daytona 500, but failed to qualify. Shepherd also attempted the season finale at Loudon driving for his own team, but he failed to make the race.

==== Cup return with his own team ====
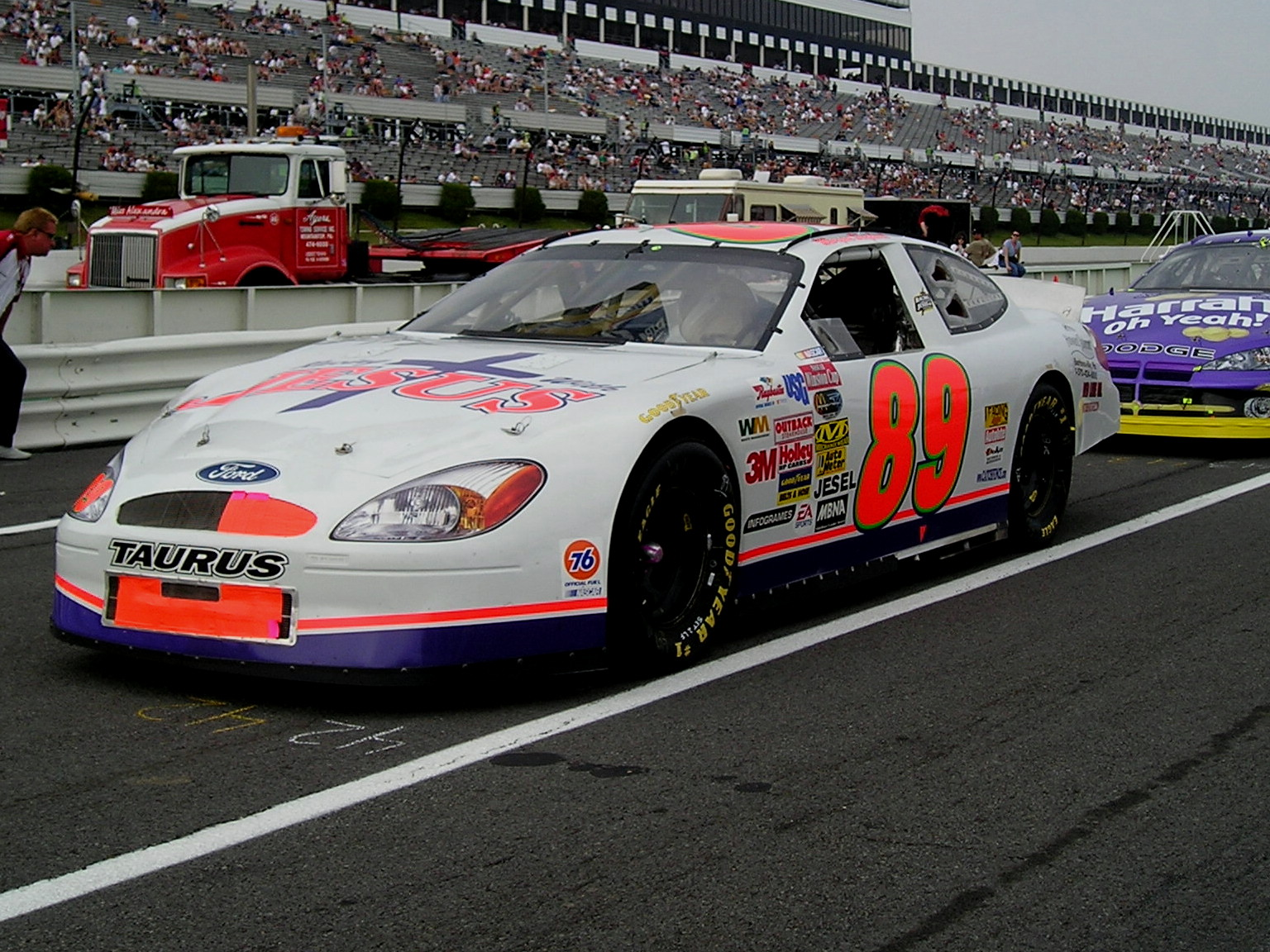
Shepherd at Pocono in 2003.

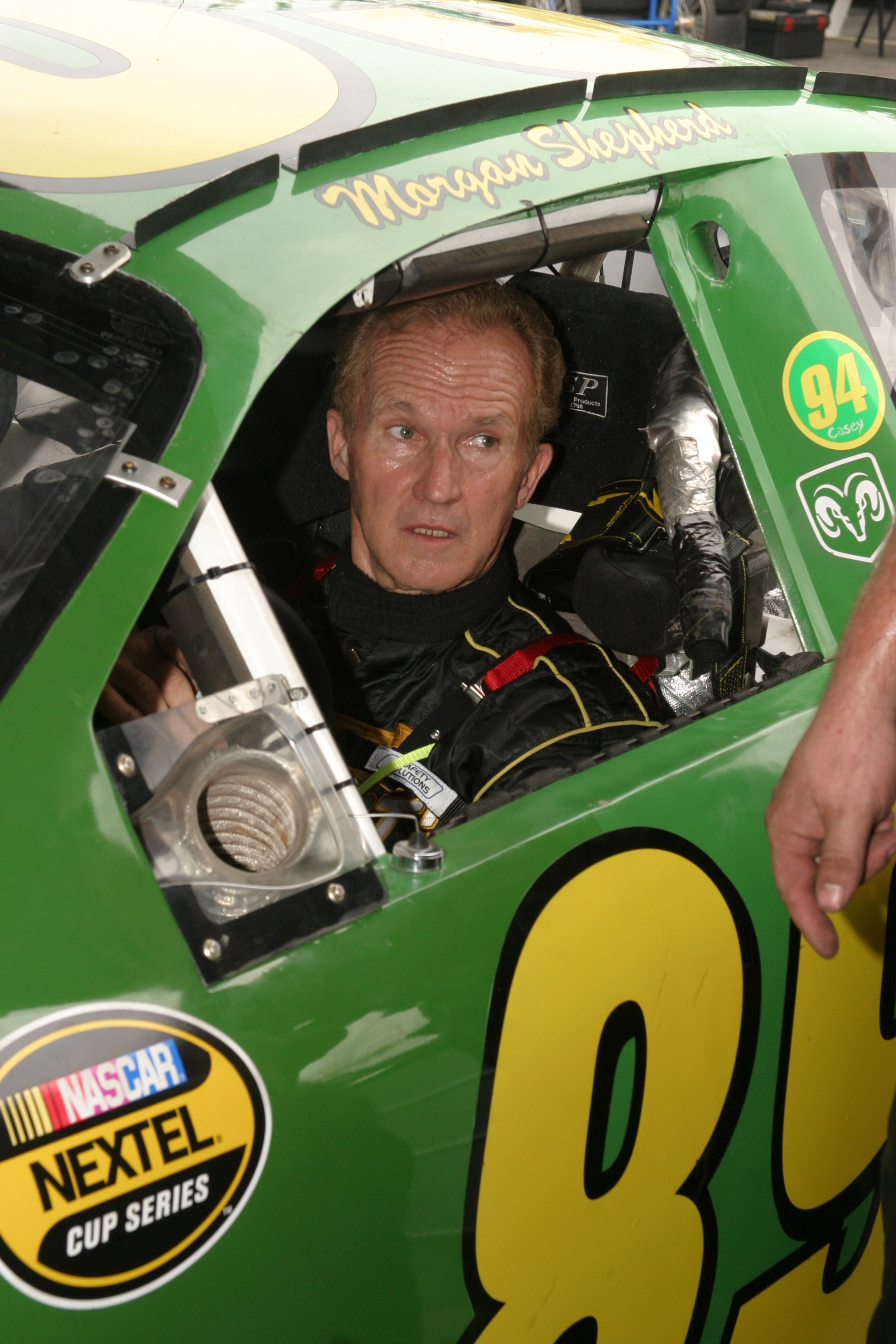
Shepherd in 2004.

Shepherd started racing for his own team on a part-time basis in 2002, driving the No. 89 Ford. He attempted his first race at Loudon, qualifying in 43rd position. Shepherd finished the race in fortieth position. As his team practically received no sponsorship money, Shepherd was unable to compete for full races and he often had to park early to save money and resources. At the next race in Pocono, Shepherd qualified 43rd and finished 42nd, after leading during a rain delay. He made six more attempts in the No. 89 and qualified for three of them, with his best finish of 40th at Kansas. Shepherd also made two additional starts for Ware Racing Enterprises, but he failed to make the race at Dover and Talladega.

Shepherd had to cut back on his Cup schedule in 2003 and only attempted seven races that year. He started his season at the Pocono 500, but was the slowest car in qualifying and did not make the race. Shepherd did make the race at the New England 300 where he parked after 43 laps and finished in last position. He qualified in 42nd place at the next race in Pocono, but only run for 44 laps and finished in 43rd. Shepherd attempted four additional races that season but failed to make any of those races.

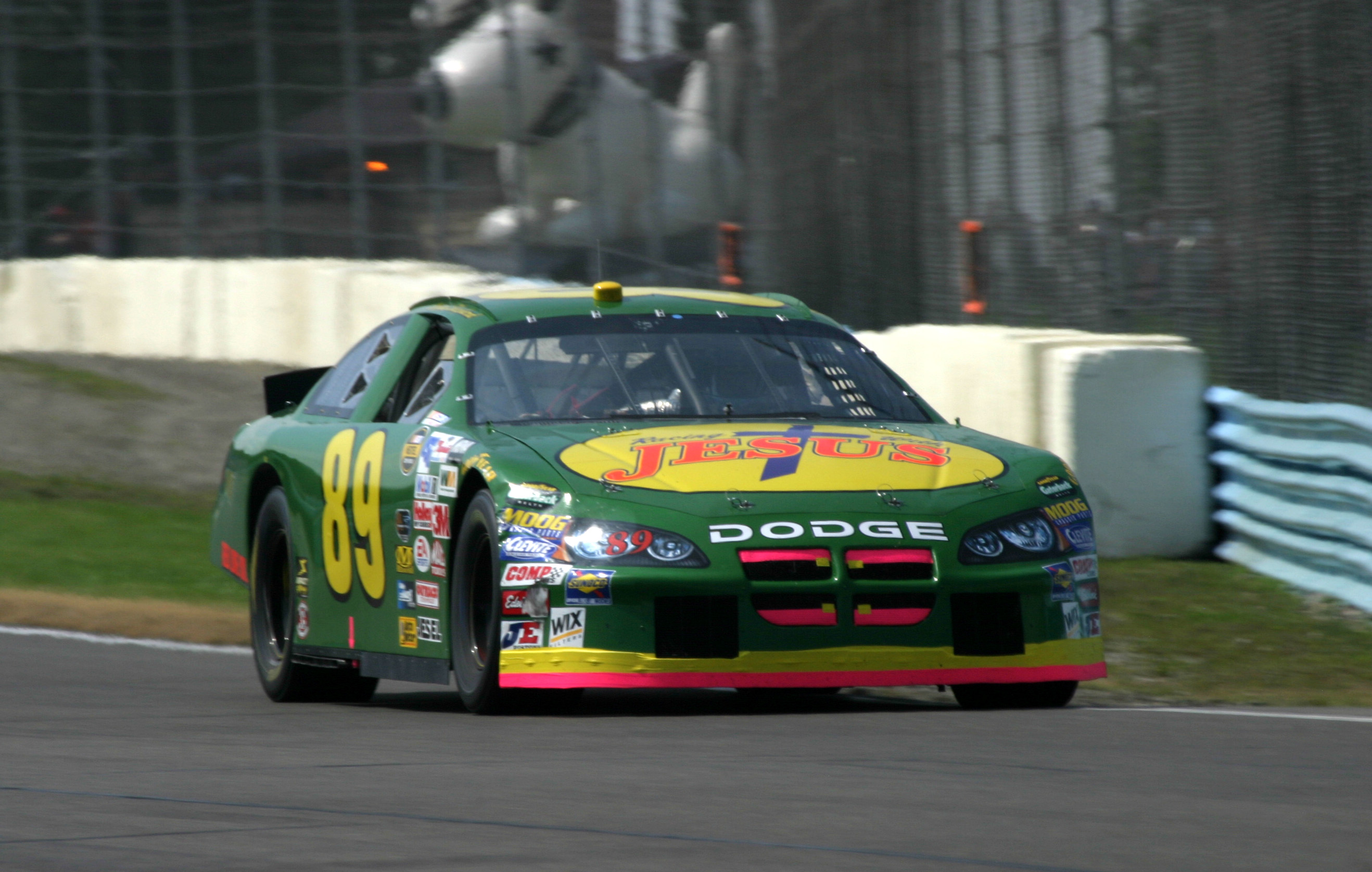
Shepherd at Watkins Glen in 2004.

For the 2004 season, Shepherd Racing Ventures switched to Dodge. The team increased their schedule, attempting 32 of the 36 races. Shepherd had a good start to the season, qualifying for the first race he attempted at Las Vegas. The No. 89 team did not have sufficient sponsorship money to complete the races, so Shepherd sometimes had to park his car early to save money. Shepherd had his best run at the spring race of Martinsville, finishing in 32nd position. Shepherd last finished a Cup race in 1999. Shepherd also ran the full race at the summer Daytona race, finishing in 33rd place. Shepherd qualified for nineteen races that year. Shepherd started his five-hundredth Cup start at the Siemens 300 at the New Hampshire International Speedway. He qualified in 41st position and finished in fortieth place after running 192 of the 300 laps. He finished 42nd in the final points standings.

As Shepherd and his team received almost no money from sponsors whatsoever, they had to cut back on their 2005 schedule. Shepherd attempted to qualify for the 2005 Daytona 500 but missed the race after he was caught up in a wreck during the Gatorade Duels. This was a big blow to Shepherd's season as he needed the prize money to compete in all the races. Shepherd qualified for the next race he entered at Las Vegas. This was a much-needed break as his team needed the prize money to keep racing. Shepherd eventually managed to qualify for four of the 21 races he entered that season. He finished 63rd in the 2005 points standings.

Shepherd's struggles continued in 2006. His team had to cut on their schedule and only entered fifteen races that year. Shepherd failed to qualify for the first nine races he entered in 2006. He made his first race of the year at the Chevy Rock & Roll 400, where he finished 43rd. The following week, he qualified for the Sylvania 300 and finished 42nd. Shepherd failed to make any additional races for the rest of the year. He finished 66th in the final points standings. Shepherd shut down his Cup team after the season and moved to the Busch Series for 2007.

==== Oldest driver to start Sprint Cup race ====
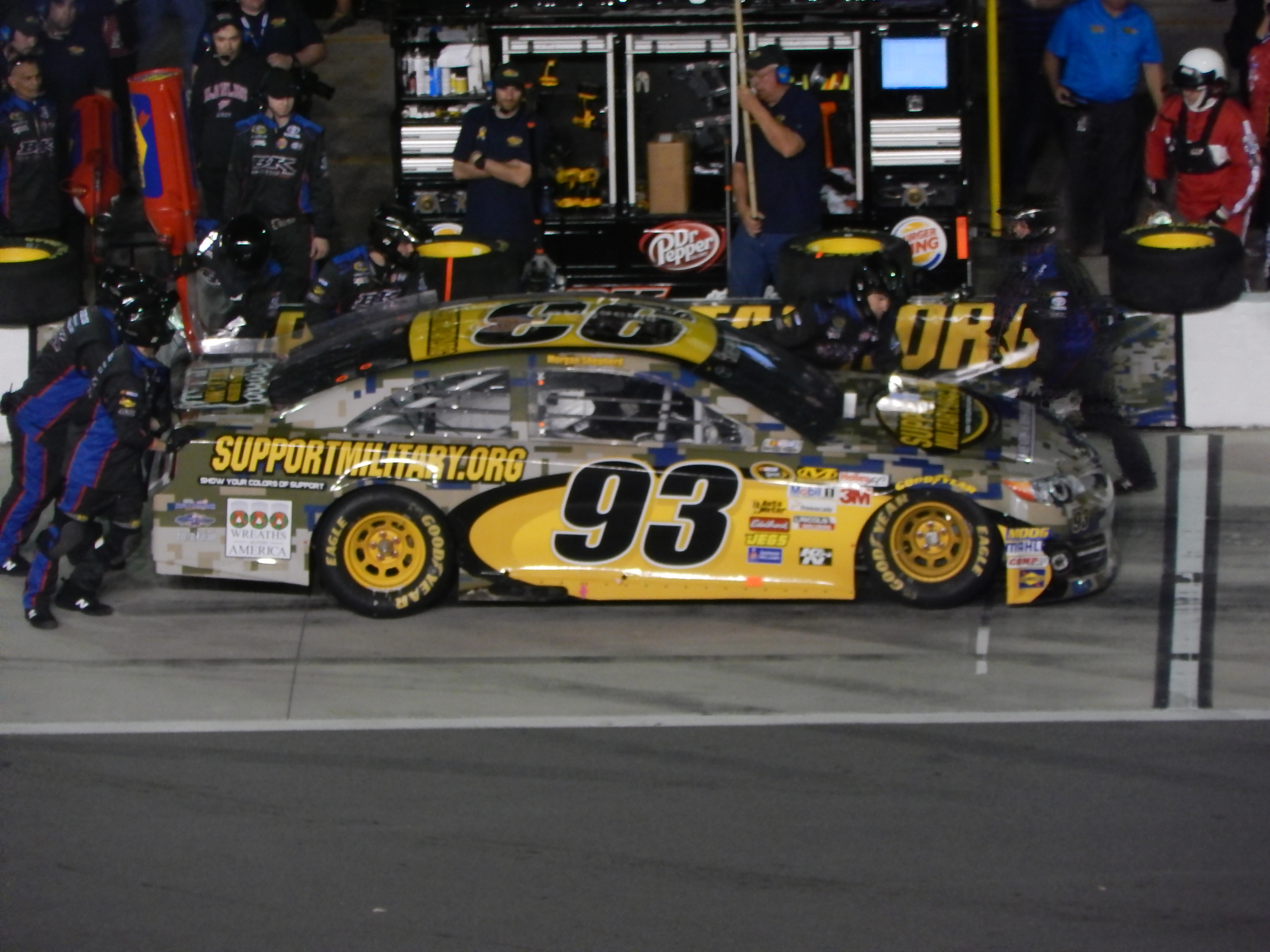
Shepherd at the 2014 Budweiser Duels.

Shepherd ran the Camping World RV Sales 301 at New Hampshire Motor Speedway for Brian Keselowski Motorsports, his first Sprint Cup race since 2006, becoming the oldest driver to race in the Sprint Cup at an age of 71 years, nine months and two days, and breaking the previous record held by Jim Fitzgerald, who ran at Riverside International Raceway in 1987 at age 65. Shepherd started 41st and finished in the same spot in a start-and-park effort, completing 92 of 301 laps.

Shepherd attempted to make the 2014 Daytona 500 in the No. 93 for BK Racing in collaboration with MacDonald Motorsports, but failed to qualify. Had he made the race, he would have been the oldest driver in Daytona 500 history. At the following race at Phoenix, Shepherd drove Joe Nemechek's No. 87 Toyota, extending his record as the oldest driver to compete in a Cup Series race.

Shepherd also ran the 2014 Camping World RV Sales 301 for Circle Sport Racing. He was the subject of a Joey Logano complaint when the 24-year old Logano was involved in an accident with Shepherd. Logano argued, "I feel like there should be a driving test before you get out in a Cup car to make sure you know how to drive before you drive one ... If you're ten laps down, what are you even doing?" NASCAR defended Shepherd, saying his speed was monitored and he ran at a reasonable pace. Logano was credited with a 40th-place finish while Shepherd, who was the last car running, albeit 27 laps behind the leaders, finished 39th. Shepherd had last finished a Cup race at the 2004 Pepsi 400.

=== Xfinity Series ===
==== Driving for Ed Whitaker and Lindy White ====
Shepherd made his Busch Series debut at Hickory Motor Speedway in 1982, the series' inaugural season. That year, he drove twelve races for Ed Whitaker. At Hickory, Shepherd won his first race in only his second start in the series. Later that season, he won at Indianapolis Raceway Park. Shepherd scored a total of eight top-five finishes that season, also earning the pole position twice. Despite only starting twelve of the twenty-nine races in the schedule, Shepherd finished eleventh in the final points standings for that year.

In 1983, Shepherd drove eighteen races for Whitaker, winning at Bristol and Richmond International Raceway, but dropping to eighteenth in the final standings. Additionally, Shepherd started from the pole at Charlotte. For 1984 Shepherd moved to Lindy White Racing. Shepherd finished in the top-ten six times that season, winning a total of three races at Bristol, Indianapolis Raceway Park, and Martinsville. He stayed with Lindy White for 1985 but had a difficult season. Due to mechanical problems Shepherd only finished three of the eleven races he started that season.

Shepherd had his best Busch series season in 1986, winning four races, all of them for Whitaker. He won at Martinsville, Bristol, Dover and Rockingham. Shepherd also made his first start for his own team at Martinsville, but retired at lap 133 due to steering problems.

==== Driving for his own team ====
Shepherd continued to enter his own car for the 1987 season, driving the No. 97 Buick. He started the year with a fifth-place finish at Daytona. A few races later at Bristol, Shepherd won his first race of the season. At Oxford, he drove the No. 68 Pontiac for Dale Shaw. Shepherd dominated the early part of the race but retired from the race on 101 after an axle broke on the car. At Road Atlanta, Shepherd scored his second win of the season. It was the only time in his career that he won on a road course. At Darlington Shepherd led 42 laps but finished second to Harry Gant. Shepherd won final race of the season at Rockingham after a photo finish with Geoff Bodine. Shepherd struggled in the 1988 season as his team was afflicted by mechanical issues and crashes throughout the year; An engine failure at Daytona after Shepherd led the early laps, retiring from the lead at Darlington after transmission problems, a crash at Nazareth after leading 31 laps and another engine failure at Dover after Shepherd had led the early part of that race. The highlight of the season was a lone win at Indianapolis Raceway Park after Shepherd took the lead with seven laps to go. It was the final Busch win of Shepherd's career.

Shepherd cut back on his Busch schedule in 1989, only running two races in his No. 97. He also made two starts for David Pearson, winning the pole at Bristol. Shepherd dominated the early part of that race but retired halfway through the race after having handling issues. In 1990, Shepherd made three starts in his No. 97 Ford with a best finish of third at Rockingham. He also made nine starts for Mike Swaim finishing fourth at Nazareth and Loudon. For 1991, Shepherd increased his schedule to sixteen races with sponsorship from Texas Pete Sauces. His season, however, was plagued by mechanical problems and Shepherd only finished four races, with a best of fifth at Richmond.

After he ran three races in his No. 97 Ford in 1992, Shepherd renumbered his car to match the No. 21 he drove for the Wood Brothers in the Cup series. Shepherd had a good run going at Loudon but retired after 203 laps. His best finish of the season was a third-place at Charlotte. Shepherd continued to race his No. 21 Ford till the 1995 season. He struggled to get results and could only score three top-ten finishes in sixteen races.

==== Substitute driver ====
Shepherd made two starts for Bobby Jones Racing in the 1996 season, but he failed to finish any of those races. Shepherd returned to Jones for two races in 1997 with a best finish of sixteenth at Bristol. Shepherd also entered his own car for two races but only managed to qualify for the race at Michigan. In 1998 Shepherd made one start for Mac Martin at Fort Worth. Shepherd also entered his own car for two races but failed to qualify for both of those races.

For 1999, partnered with Bruce Hanusosky to form High Tech Performance. The team planned to run at least fifteen races but after Shepherd failed to qualify for the first two attempts the partnership dissolved. Later that season Shepherd made two attempts for Ed Whitaker but he failed to qualify for those races as well. Shepherd joined Xpress Motorsports for the race at Rockingham and qualified in the eleventh position. In the race, Shepherd scored his most recent top-ten finish with a tenth place finish. For the next two seasons, Shepherd attempted occasional races with different owners but he failed to make any of those races.

Shepherd joined Davis Motorsports for the 2003 season, driving their No. 0 and No. 70 Chevy. Shepherd qualified for ten of twelve races he entered with the team. His best finish was an eleventh place finish at Talladega. Later in the season, Shepherd partnered with Dayne Miller. Shepherd only qualified for four of the ten races he entered with Miller. In 2004 Shepherd made nine attempts with a bunch of different teams. Shepherd only qualified for two races and he failed to finish any of those. In 2006, Shepherd returned to Davis Motorsports and made five starts in a start and park effort.

==== Forming his own team ====
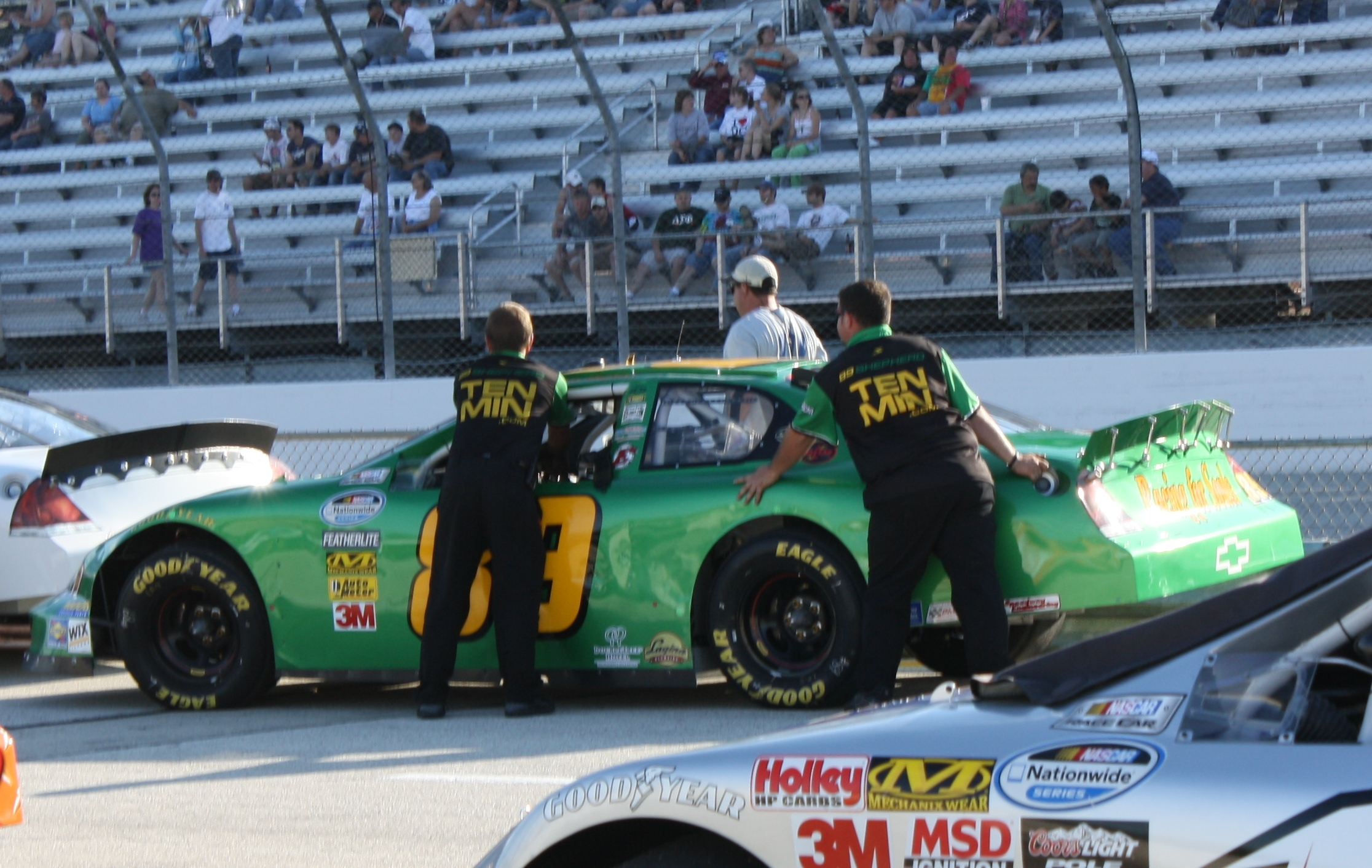
Shepherd's No. 89 pushed off after failing to qualify at Milwaukee in 2009

After several years of competing part-time for several teams, Shepherd began fielding his No. 89 in 2007. Shepherd would start and park the majority of the schedule but did qualify for sixteen of the twenty races he attempted in his self owned Dodge. He also ran five races for JD Motorsports. For 2008, Shepherd announced intentions to run the full Nationwide Series schedule for the first time in his career. While he would miss the opening race at Daytona, Shepherd would rebound, making the next 7 races before missing the race at Mexico City. The following week at Talladega, Shepherd would finish thirteenth, his best finish in the series since 2003. It would also elevate the No. 89 team to the top-thirty in points, locking them into the races. Unfortunately, 2008 would end on a sour note, with Shepherd and team missing four of the final five races of the season.

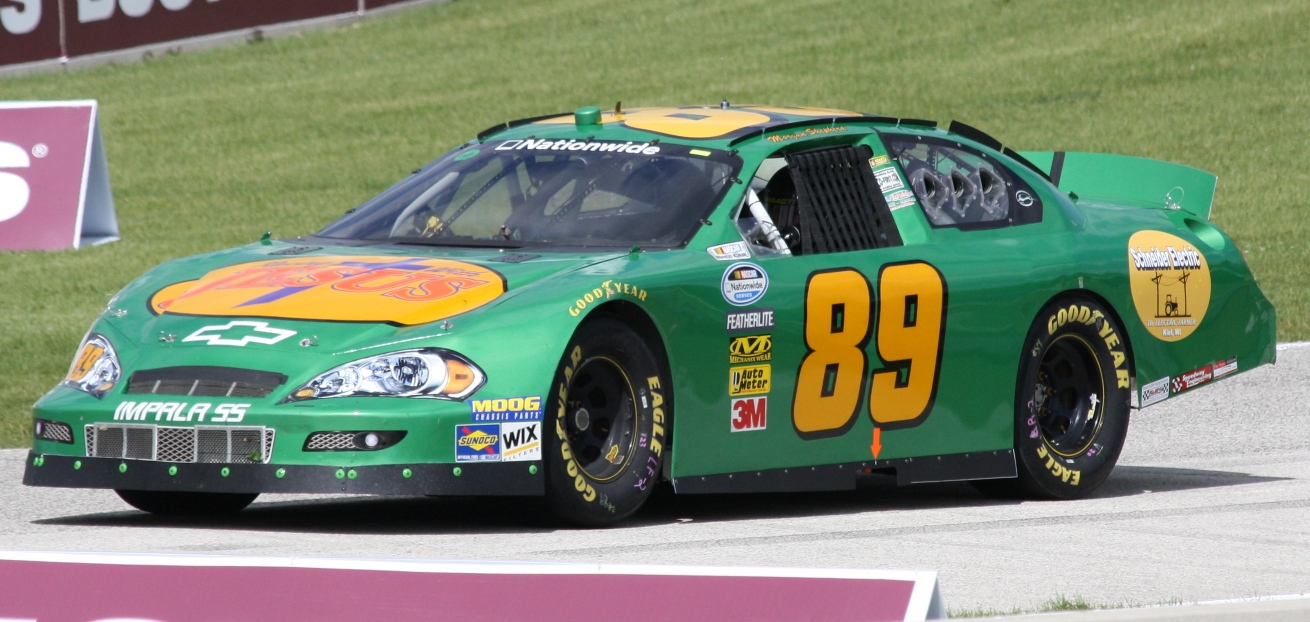
2010 Nationwide car at Road America.

2009 would see a big change come to the team, with Shepherd leaving Dodge, who he had been with primarily since 2004, and joining Chevrolet. At Daytona, Shepherd would secure a starting spot in the race, his first Daytona February start in the series since 1994. The first half of 2009 would see Shepherd only miss races, and score a best finish of thirteenth at Las Vegas. The second half of the season would once again prove difficult, missing eleven races. 2010 would start with mixed results, a strong showing at Daytona was followed by two straight DNQs. Shepherd and his team would receive a big break. Following the release of John Wes Townley from Richard Childress Racing, Zaxby's, which is owned by Townley's father, cut back sponsorship of the No. 21 team. Childress would make a deal with Shepherd and his team, Faith Motorsports. The alliance would run as Shepherd Racing Ventures and would allow Shepherd to drive the 21 car to keep it up in owner points, as well as run full-time with limited sponsorship from Zaxby's. The 89 Faith Motorsports Chevy would run as a start and park effort when Shepherd was behind the 21.

For 2011, the 89 would return full-time under the Shepherd Racing Ventures moniker, with the RCR/SVR 21 becoming the 89. This would guarantee the 89 into the first five races of the season. 2011 would be one of his strongest seasons, running all 33 races, as well as having sponsorship for the majority of the season. However, Shepherd and team's success would turn sour late in the season, as mechanical failures and accidents would plague Shepherd. During the 2011 Wypall 200 at Phoenix, Shepherd was en route to his best finish of the season. However, he was caught up in a late incident.

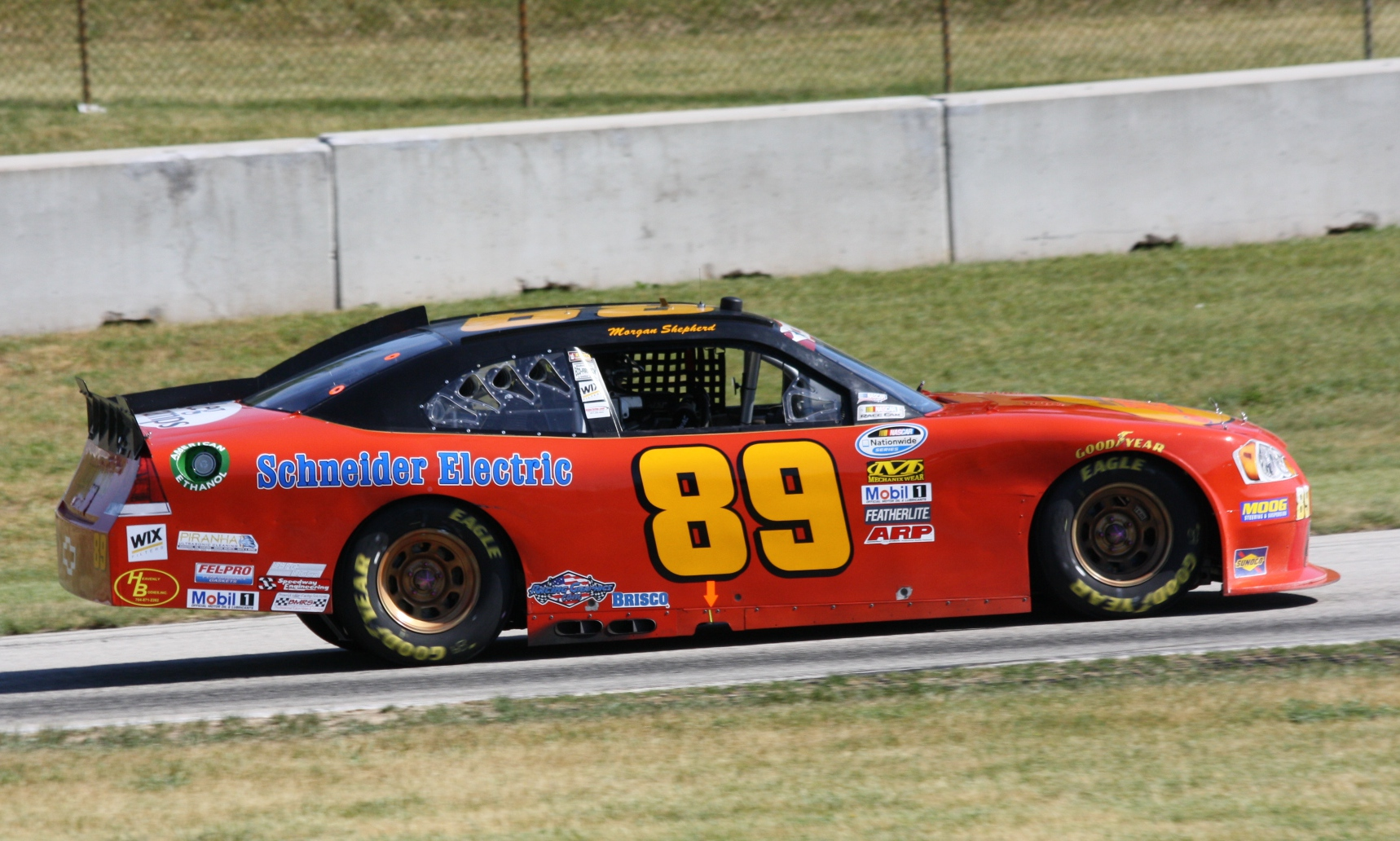
Shepherd at Road America in 2012

The 2012 season turned out to be a real struggle for Shepherd. The team lacked owner points and Shepherd had to qualify on time for the races. Because of that, they missed ten races. The team also lacked sponsorship and in most races the team only had one set of tires and could only run the race for as long as that set of tires lasted. Shepherd only finished two races that season. He did become the oldest driver to lead a Nationwide Series race when he led three laps at Richmond. Shepherd dropped to 29th in the final point standings.

Shepherd's struggles continued in 2013. Before the start of the season NASCAR cut the Nationwide field to forty cars. This was a big blow to Shepherd and his team as it was now even harder to qualify for the races. After failing to qualify for the first two races he attempted that season, Shepherd announced that the lack of sponsorship forced him to scale back on his schedule. He stated that he did not know if or when he would be attending another race event in 2013 due to non-funding. Shepherd returned at Richmond, but again failed to make the race. Shepherd did qualify for the next race at Talladega, but retired on lap 72 because of a fuel pressure problem. He would qualify for seven additional races that season, finishing only once at the fall race at Dover.

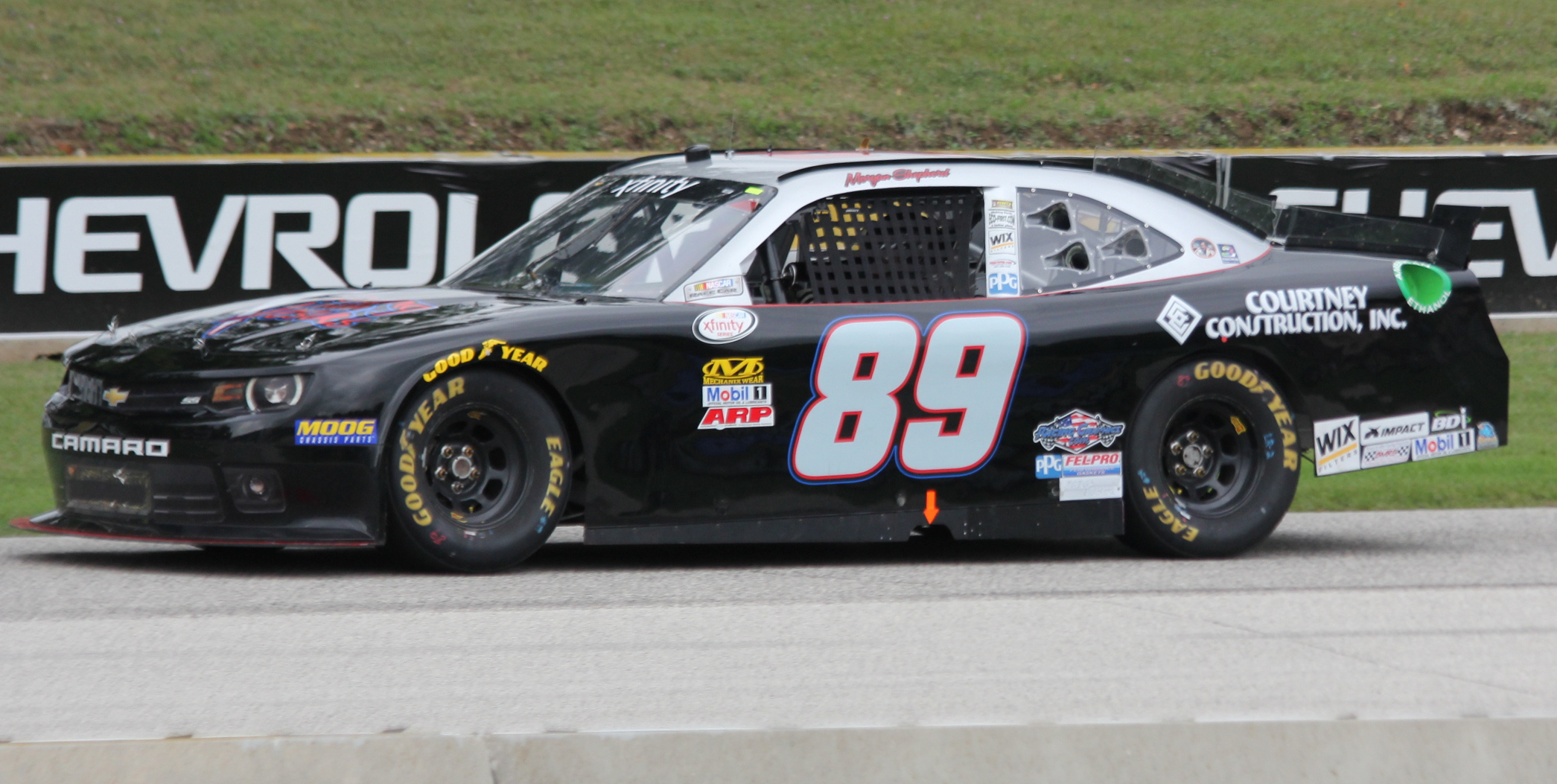
Shepherd at Road America in 2015

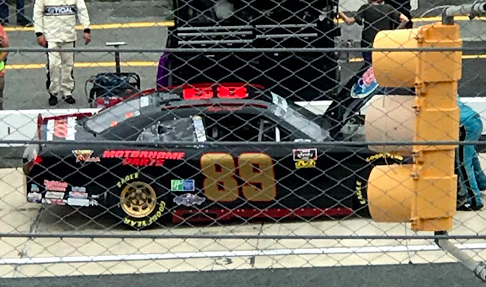
Shepherd on pit road at the Xfinity Series race at Dover International Speedway in 2018

Shepherd became the oldest driver to lead a Nationwide Series race at the age of seventy when he led three laps in the 2012 Virginia 529 College Savings 250 at Richmond International Raceway. Shepherd extended this record when he led one lap in the 2016 Sparks Energy 300 at Talladega Superspeedway. Shepherd was 74 during this race, he again extended the record when he led during the 2016 Subway Firecracker 250 at Daytona. The record was extended once more during the 2017 VFW Sport Clips Help a Hero 200 at the Darlington Raceway at age 75.

== Personal life ==
According to Shepherd, he had a spiritual awakening on February 23, 1975. After years of extramarital affairs and excessive drinking, he was returning from Speedweeks when he discovered that his third wife had left him. Following a week of partying, Shepherd awoke that Sunday and vowed to change his life for the better, explaining in a 2005 interview, "When I got done praying, I'm not kidding you, I felt like I could jump straight through the roof. It was like a load was taken off of me and life has not been the same since."

Shepherd has been married to his wife, Cindy since 1994. He has six children and ten grandchildren. When not at the race track, Shepherd is involved in several religious causes, and also hosts a charity event for disabled Americans during the offseason.

In November 2020, Shepherd revealed that he had been diagnosed with Parkinson's disease.

== Motorsports career results ==
=== NASCAR ===
(key) (Bold – Pole position awarded by qualifying time. Italics – Pole position earned by points standings or practice time. * – Most laps led.)

==== Grand National Series ====
NASCAR Grand National Series results
Year	Team	No.	Make	1	2	3	4	5	6	7	8	9	10	11	12	13	14	15	16	17	18	19	20	21	22	23	24	25	26	27	28	29	30	31	32	33	34	35	36	37	38	39	40	41	42	43	44	45	46	47	48	NGNC	Pts	Ref
1970	Bill Flowers Racing	93	Chevy	RSD	DAY	DAY	DAY	RCH	CAR	SVH	ATL	BRI	TAL	NWS	CLB	DAR	BLV	LGY	CLT	SMR	MAR	MCH	RSD	HCY; 19	KPT	GPS	DAY	AST	TPN	TRN	BRI	SMR	NSV	ATL	CLB	ONA	MCH	TAL	BGS	SBO	DAR	HCY; 14	RCH	DOV	NCF	NWS	CLT	MAR	MGR; 20	CAR	LGY	90th	69	

==== Sprint Cup Series ====
NASCAR Sprint Cup Series results
Year	Team	No.	Make	1	2	3	4	5	6	7	8	9	10	11	12	13	14	15	16	17	18	19	20	21	22	23	24	25	26	27	28	29	30	31	32	33	34	35	36	NSCC	Pts	Ref
1977	Makar Racing	84	Mercury	RSD	DAY; DNQ	RCH	CAR	ATL	NWS	DAR	BRI	MAR	TAL	NSV	DOV; 10	CLT; 13	RSD	MCH	DAY	NSV	POC	TAL	MCH	BRI	DAR	RCH	DOV	MAR	NWS	CLT	CAR	ATL; 33	ONT							54th	322	
1978	Makar Racing	84	Mercury	RSD	DAY; 40	RCH	CAR	ATL	BRI	DAR	NWS	MAR	TAL	DOV	CLT; 12	NSV	RSD	MCH	DAY	NSV	POC	TAL	MCH	BRI	DAR	RCH	DOV	MAR	NWS	CLT	CAR	ATL	ONT							76th	170	
1979	Makar Racing	84	Mercury	RSD	DAY; DNQ	CAR	RCH	ATL	NWS	BRI	DAR	MAR	TAL	NSV	DOV	CLT	TWS	RSD	MCH	DAY	NSV	POC	TAL	MCH	BRI	DAR	RCH	DOV	MAR	CLT	NWS	CAR	ATL	ONT						NA	-	
1981	Cliff Stewart Racing	5	Pontiac	RSD	DAY	**RCH**; 4	CAR; 28	ATL; 8	BRI; 4	NWS; 9	DAR; 34	MAR; 1	TAL; 23	NSV; 8	DOV; 6	CLT; 6	TWS; 31	RSD; 21	MCH; 15	DAY; 20	NSV; 13	POC; 29	TAL; 36																	13th	3261	
1981	Martin-Reeder Racing	02	Buick																					MCH; 34																13th	3261	
1981	Gordon Racing	24	Buick																						BRI; 19	DAR; 16	RCH; 29	DOV; 12		NWS; 6	CLT; 8			RSD; 13						13th	3261	
1981	Benfield Racing	98	Pontiac																										MAR; 28											13th	3261	
1981	Benfield Racing	96	Buick																													CAR; 27	ATL; 31							13th	3261	
1982	Benfield Racing	98	Buick	DAY; 19	RCH; 10	BRI; 3	ATL; 6	CAR; 5	DAR; 30	NWS; 7	MAR; 26	TAL; 5	NSV; 15	DOV; 7	CLT; 19	POC; 35	RSD	MCH; 8	DAY; 4	**NSV**; 26	POC; 28	TAL; 8	MCH; 32	BRI; 5	DAR; 36	RCH; 12	DOV; 24	NWS; 13	CLT; 30	MAR; 18	CAR; 5	**ATL**; 25	RSD; 8							10th	3451	
1983	Reeder Racing	02	Chevy	DAY; DNQ																																				20th	2733	
1983	Beahr Racing	35	Ford		RCH; 31	CAR	ATL																																	20th	2733	
1983	Gordon Racing	24	Chrysler					DAR; 26	NWS																															20th	2733	
1983	Zervakis Racing Team	01	Buick							MAR; 32																														20th	2733	
1983	Jim Stacy Racing	2	Buick								TAL; 17	NSV; 4	DOV; 6	BRI; 3	CLT; 9	RSD; 8	POC; 15	MCH; 10	DAY; 2	NSV; 10	POC; 19	TAL; 27	MCH; 37	BRI; 8	DAR; 9	RCH; 16	DOV; 6	MAR; 29	NWS; 8	CLT; 25	CAR; 27	ATL; 7	RSD; 33							20th	2733	
1984	Harrington Racing	2	Buick	DAY	RCH; 13	CAR	ATL																																	29th	1811	
1984	Henderson Motorsports	26	Buick					BRI; 27	NWS		MAR; 26	TAL	NSV																											29th	1811	
1984	Bahre Racing	23	Chevy							DAR; 26				DOV; 36	CLT; 17	RSD	POC		DAY; 40																					29th	1811	
1984	Barkdoll Racing	38	Chevy															MCH; 22																						29th	1811	
1984	U.S. Racing	6	Buick																	NSV; 26	POC																			29th	1811	
1984	Jimmy Means Racing	52	Chevy																			TAL; 30																		29th	1811	
1984	Hamby Motorsports	17	Chevy																				MCH; 28	BRI; 19	DAR; 35		DOV; 22													29th	1811	
1984	Hamby Motorsports	17	Pontiac																							RCH; 12		MAR; 24												29th	1811	
1984	U.S. Racing	6	Chevy																										CLT; 23	NWS										29th	1811	
1984	Benfield Racing	98	Chevy																												CAR; 6	ATL; 14	RSD; 22							29th	1811	
1985	Arrington Racing	67	Chrysler	DAY; 15	RCH																																			31st	1406	
1985	Bahre Racing	23	Chevy			CAR; 38	ATL	BRI																																31st	1406	
1985	Petty Enterprises	1	Ford						DAR; 18	NWS																														31st	1406	
1985	Bobby Hawkins Racing	16	Chevy								MAR; 27												DAR; 37					CLT; 7		ATL; 5	RSD									31st	1406	
1985	Shepherd Racing	38	Chevy									TAL; 13	DOV																											31st	1406	
1985	Helen Rae Motorsports	00	Chevy											CLT; 25	RSD	POC	MCH	DAY; 39	POC	TAL	MCH; 35	BRI		RCH; 30	DOV; 22	MAR; 29	NWS; 27													31st	1406	
1985	Beahr Racing	35	Ford																										CAR; 39											31st	1406	
1986	Race Hill Farm Team	47	Chevy	DAY; 22	RCH																																			18th	2896	
1986	Race Hill Farm Team	47	Buick			CAR; 4	ATL; 1		DAR; 23			TAL; 6	DOV	CLT; 9		POC; 18	MCH; 29	DAY; 37	POC; 32	TAL; 6		MCH; 36		DAR; 4																18th	2896	
1986	Langley Racing	64	Ford					BRI; 31																																18th	2896	
1986	Hylton Motorsports	48	Chevy							NWS; 19																														18th	2896	
1986	C & M Motorsports	94	Pontiac								MAR; 19																													18th	2896	
1986	RahMoc Enterprises	75	Pontiac												RSD; 27						GLN; 11		BRI; 22		RCH; 3	DOV; 10	MAR; 29	NWS; 25	CLT; 32	CAR; 24*	ATL; 27	RSD; 38								18th	2896	
1987	King Racing	26	Buick	DAY; 16	CAR; 5	RCH; 31	ATL; 10	DAR; 22	NWS; 27	BRI; 8	**MAR**; 17	TAL; 10	CLT; 2	DOV; 32	POC; 31	RSD; 35	MCH; 25	DAY; 5	POC; 36	TAL; 39	GLN; 22	MCH; 3	BRI; 24	DAR; 9	RCH; 30	DOV; 40	MAR; 5	NWS; 4	CLT; 20	CAR; 5	RSD; 25	ATL; 39								17th	3099	
1988	Winkle Motorsports	97	Buick	DAY; 42	**RCH**; 16	CAR; 7																																		28th	2193	
1988	Shepherd Racing	47	Buick				ATL; 30	DAR; 39	BRI	NWS	MAR	TAL	CLT; 26																											28th	2193	
1988	Mach 1 Racing	33	Chevy											DOV; 2	RSD; 42	POC; 16	MCH; 34	DAY; 7																						28th	2193	
1988	RahMoc Enterprises	75	Pontiac																**POC**; 6	TAL; 40																				28th	2193	
1988	Baker-Schiff Racing	88	Olds																		GLN; 7	MCH; 4				DOV; 29														28th	2193	
1988	Shepherd Racing	57	Buick																				BRI; DNQ	DAR; 39	RCH; 31		MAR; 31	CLT; 16	NWS; 22	CAR; 14	PHO									28th	2193	
1988	RahMoc Enterprises	57	Pontiac																													ATL; 40								28th	2193	
1989	RahMoc Enterprises	75	Pontiac	DAY; 15	CAR; 27	ATL; 10	RCH; 33	DAR; 16	BRI; 26	NWS; 17	MAR; 18	TAL; 4	CLT; 32	DOV; 33	SON; 7	POC; 5	MCH; 35	DAY; 2	POC; 8	TAL; 6*	**GLN**; 6*	MCH; 2	BRI; 26	DAR; 9	RCH; 27	DOV; 16	MAR; 28	CLT; 10	NWS; 5	CAR; 36	PHO; 12	ATL; 8								13th	3403	
1990	Bud Moore Engineering	15	Ford	DAY; 10	RCH; 7	CAR; 7	ATL; 2	DAR; 5	BRI; 8	NWS; 5	MAR; 3	TAL; 8	CLT; 8	DOV; 6	SON; 29	POC; 11	MCH; 13	DAY; 34	POC; 36	TAL; 26	GLN; 6	MCH; 9	BRI; 31	DAR; 21	RCH; 30	DOV; 25	MAR; 25	NWS; 12	CLT; 2	CAR; 12	PHO; 3	ATL; 1								5th	3689	
1991	Bud Moore Engineering	15	Ford	DAY; 34	RCH; 8	CAR; 10	ATL; 4	DAR; 8	BRI; 10	NWS; 4	MAR; 30	TAL; 14	CLT; 14	DOV; 8	SON; 42	POC; 9	MCH; 9	DAY; 20	POC; 34	TAL; 14	GLN; 36	MCH; 26	BRI; 6	DAR; 19	RCH; 23	DOV; 3	MAR; 11	NWS; 3	CLT; 28	CAR; 17	PHO; 10	ATL; 6								12th	3438	
1992	Wood Brothers Racing	21	Ford	DAY; 2	CAR; 13	RCH; 10	ATL; 10	DAR; 13	BRI; 7	NWS; 12	MAR; 6	TAL; 9	CLT; 29	DOV; 10	SON; 29	POC; 25	MCH; 12	DAY; 19	POC; 15	TAL; 13	GLN; 2	MCH; 10	BRI; 13	DAR; 31	RCH; 7	DOV; 5	MAR; 21	NWS; 17	CLT; 13	CAR; 13	PHO; 38	ATL; 11								14th	3549	
1993	Wood Brothers Racing	21	Ford	DAY; 7	CAR; 35	RCH; 14	ATL; 1	DAR; 10	BRI; 7	NWS; 8	MAR; 19	TAL; 15	SON; 14	CLT; 9	DOV; 9	POC; 7	MCH; 7	DAY; 14	NHA; 14	POC; 4	TAL; 7	GLN; 28	MCH; 2	BRI; 13	DAR; 8	RCH; 30	DOV; 9	MAR; 9	NWS; 32	CLT; 14	CAR; 11	PHO; 11	ATL; 32							7th	3807	
1994	Wood Brothers Racing	21	Ford	DAY; 5	CAR; 16	RCH; 15	ATL; 2	DAR; 32	BRI; 18	NWS; 22	MAR; 5	TAL; 9	SON; 7	CLT; 28	DOV; 25	POC; 4	MCH; 5	DAY; 9	NHA; 6	POC; 5	TAL; 15	IND; 10	GLN; 16	MCH; 26	BRI; 18	DAR; 3	RCH; 14	DOV; 10	MAR; 15	NWS; 30	CLT; 2	CAR; 3	PHO; 12	ATL; 6						6th	4029	
1995	Wood Brothers Racing	21	Ford	DAY; 10	CAR; 34	RCH; 15	ATL; 6	DAR; 8	BRI; 20	NWS; 19	MAR; 31	TAL; 3	SON; 15	CLT; 11	DOV; 26	POC; 7	MCH; 5	DAY; 24	NHA; 2	POC; 24	TAL; 4	IND; 10	GLN; 30	MCH; 16	BRI; 17	DAR; 11	RCH; 27	DOV; 33	MAR; 19	NWS; 23	CLT; 14	CAR; 18	PHO; 7	ATL; 22						11th	3618	
1996	Butch Mock Motorsports	75	Ford	DAY; 31	CAR; 37	RCH; 32	ATL; 30	DAR; 8	BRI; 30	NWS; 27	MAR; 20	TAL; 43	SON; 24	CLT; 29	DOV; 32	POC; 6	MCH; 11	DAY; 15	NHA; 22	POC; 17	TAL; 14	IND; 5	GLN; 9	MCH; 11	BRI; 19	DAR; 24	RCH; 23	DOV; 18	MAR; 6	NWS; 14	CLT; 23	CAR; 29	PHO; 17	ATL; 28						19th	3133	
1997	Precision Products Racing	1	Pontiac	DAY; 29	CAR; 10	RCH; 43	ATL; 3	DAR; 12	TEX; 24	BRI; 28	MAR; 35	SON; 23	TAL; 28	CLT; 9	DOV; 38	POC; 12													DOV; 31	MAR; DNQ	CLT; 22	TAL; 12	CAR; 34	PHO; DNQ	ATL; 27					38th	2033	
1997	Jasper Motorsports	77	Ford														MCH; DNQ	CAL; 24	DAY; 32	NHA; 37	POC; 27	IND; DNQ	GLN; DNQ	MCH; 40	BRI; DNQ	DAR; DNQ	RCH; DNQ	NHA												38th	2033	
1998	Shepherd Racing	05	Pontiac	DAY	CAR; DNQ	LVS	ATL; DNQ	DAR; DNQ																																47th	843	
1998	Team SABCO	46	Chevy						BRI; 24	TEX			CAL; 24	CLT; DNQ	DOV; DNQ	RCH																								47th	843	
1998	Richard Childress Racing	31	Chevy								MAR; 11	TAL; 35																												47th	843	
1998	Stavola Brothers Racing	8	Chevy														MCH; 43	POC	SON	NHA																ATL; 39				47th	843	
1998	LJ Racing	91	Chevy																		POC; 40	IND; 15	GLN; 43	MCH; 42	BRI; 29	NHA; 26	DAR; DNQ	RCH												47th	843	
1998	American Equipment Racing	96	Chevy																										DOV; DNQ	MAR	CLT	TAL	DAY	PHO	CAR					47th	843	
1999	Pinnacle Motorsports	81	Ford	DAY; DNQ																																				65th	67	
1999	Donlavey Racing	90	Ford		CAR; 32		ATL; DNQ	DAR	TEX	BRI	MAR; DNQ	TAL	CAL	RCH																										65th	67	
1999	Zali Racing	92	Ford			LVS; DNQ																																		65th	67	
1999	Shepherd Racing	05	Pontiac												CLT; DNQ	DOV	MCH	POC	SON	DAY	NHA		IND; DNQ	GLN	MCH	BRI	DAR	RCH	NHA	DOV	MAR; DNQ	CLT	TAL	CAR	PHO	HOM	ATL; DNQ			65th	67	
1999	LJ Racing	91	Chevy																			POC; DNQ																		65th	67	
2000	Hover Motorsports	80	Ford	DAY	CAR	LVS	ATL	DAR	BRI	TEX	MAR	TAL	CAL	RCH	CLT	DOV	MCH	POC	SON	DAY	NHA	POC	IND	GLN	MCH	BRI	DAR	RCH	NHA	DOV	MAR	CLT	TAL	CAR	PHO	HOM	ATL; DNQ			NA	-	
2001	Hover Motorsports	80	Ford	DAY; DNQ	CAR	LVS	ATL	DAR	BRI	TEX	MAR	TAL	CAL	RCH	CLT	DOV	MCH	POC	SON	DAY	CHI	NHA	POC	IND	GLN	MCH	BRI	DAR	RCH	DOV	KAN	CLT	MAR	TAL	PHO	CAR	HOM	ATL		NA	-	
2001	Shepherd Racing Ventures	89	Ford																																				NHA; DNQ	NA	-	
2002	Shepherd Racing Ventures	89	Ford	DAY	CAR	LVS	ATL	DAR	BRI	TEX	MAR; Wth	TAL	CAL	RCH	CLT	DOV	POC	MCH; Wth	SON	DAY	CHI	NHA; 40	POC; 42	IND; Wth	GLN	MCH; Wth	BRI; DNQ	DAR; 43	RCH; Wth	NHA; 41		KAN; 40		CLT; Wth	MAR; DNQ	ATL; Wth	CAR	PHO; DNQ	HOM	55th	202	
2002	Ware Racing Enterprises	51	Dodge																												DOV; DNQ		TAL; DNQ							55th	202	
2003	Shepherd Racing Ventures	89	Ford	DAY	CAR	LVS	ATL	DAR	BRI	TEX	TAL	MAR	CAL	RCH	CLT	DOV	POC; DNQ	MCH	SON	DAY	CHI	NHA; 43	POC; 43	IND; Wth	GLN	MCH; Wth	BRI; DNQ	DAR	RCH	NHA; DNQ	DOV; DNQ	TAL; Wth	KAN	CLT	MAR; DNQ	ATL; Wth	PHO	CAR	HOM	69th	68	
2004	Shepherd Racing Ventures	89	Dodge	DAY	CAR; Wth	LVS; 42	ATL; DNQ	DAR; 38	BRI; DNQ	TEX; DNQ	MAR; 32	TAL; 41	CAL; 36	RCH; 39	CLT; DNQ	DOV; 42	POC; 38	MCH; 40	SON; DNQ	DAY; 33	CHI; Wth	NHA; 40	POC; 37	IND; DNQ	GLN; 38	MCH; 34	BRI; 41	CAL; DNQ	RCH; DNQ	NHA; 40	DOV; 34	TAL; Wth	KAN; DNQ	CLT; DNQ	MAR; DNQ	ATL; DNQ	PHO; 41	DAR; 43	HOM; DNQ	42nd	925	
2005	Shepherd Racing Ventures	89	Dodge	DAY; DNQ	CAL; Wth	LVS; 40	ATL; DNQ	BRI	MAR; Wth	TEX	PHO	TAL	DAR; DNQ	RCH; 42	CLT	DOV	POC; 42	MCH; DNQ	SON	DAY; Wth	CHI	NHA; 41	POC; DNQ	IND; DNQ	GLN; Wth	MCH; DNQ	BRI; DNQ	CAL	RCH; DNQ	NHA; DNQ	DOV; DNQ	TAL; DNQ	KAN	CLT	MAR; DNQ	ATL; DNQ	TEX	PHO; DNQ	HOM; DNQ	63rd	162	
2006	Shepherd Racing Ventures	89	Dodge	DAY; DNQ	CAL; DNQ	LVS; DNQ	ATL; Wth	BRI; DNQ	MAR; DNQ	TEX	PHO; DNQ	TAL; DNQ	RCH	DAR	CLT	DOV	POC	MCH	SON	DAY	CHI	NHA; DNQ	POC	IND	GLN	MCH	BRI; DNQ	CAL	RCH; 43	NHA; 42	DOV; DNQ	KAN	TAL	CLT; DNQ	MAR; DNQ	ATL	TEX	PHO; DNQ	HOM; Wth	66th	71	
2013	Brian Keselowski Motorsports	52	Toyota	DAY	PHO	LVS	BRI	CAL	MAR	TEX	KAN	RCH	TAL	DAR	CLT	DOV	POC	MCH	SON	KEN	DAY	NHA; 41	IND	POC	GLN	MCH	BRI	ATL	RCH	CHI	NHA	DOV	KAN	CLT	TAL	MAR	TEX	PHO	HOM	76th	0^{1}	
2014	BK Racing	93	Toyota	DAY; DNQ																																				72nd	0^{1}	
2014	Identity Ventures Racing	87	Toyota		PHO; 43	LVS	BRI	CAL	MAR	TEX	DAR	RCH	TAL	KAN	CLT	DOV	POC	MCH	SON	KEN	DAY																			72nd	0^{1}	
2014	Circle Sport	33	Chevy																			NHA; 39	IND	POC	GLN	MCH	BRI	ATL	RCH	CHI	NHA	DOV	KAN	CLT	TAL	MAR	TEX	PHO	HOM	72nd	0^{1}	

===== Daytona 500 =====
Year	Team	Manufacturer	Start	Finish
1977	Makar Racing	Mercury	DNQ	
1978	Makar Racing	Mercury	37	40
1979	Makar Racing	Mercury	DNQ	
1982	Benfield Racing	Buick	24	19
1983	Reeder Racing	Chevrolet	DNQ	
1985	Arrington Racing	Chrysler	36	15
1986	Race Hill Farm Team	Chevrolet	39	22
1987	King Racing	Buick	35	16
1988	Winkle Motorsports	Buick	11	42
1989	RahMoc Enterprises	Pontiac	3	15
1990	Bud Moore Engineering	Ford	30	10
1991	Bud Moore Engineering	Ford	34	34
1992	Wood Brothers Racing	Ford	4	2
1993	Wood Brothers Racing	Ford	32	7
1994	Wood Brothers Racing	Ford	12	5
1995	Wood Brothers Racing	Ford	30	10
1996	Butch Mock Motorsports	Ford	12	31
1997	Precision Products Racing	Pontiac	42	29
1999	Pinnacle Motorsports	Ford	DNQ	
2001	Hover Motorsports	Ford	DNQ	
2005	Shepherd Racing Ventures	Dodge	DNQ	
2006	Shepherd Racing Ventures	Dodge	DNQ	
2014	BK Racing	Toyota	DNQ	

==== Xfinity Series ====
NASCAR Xfinity Series results
Year	Team	No.	Make	1	2	3	4	5	6	7	8	9	10	11	12	13	14	15	16	17	18	19	20	21	22	23	24	25	26	27	28	29	30	31	32	33	34	35	NXSC	Pts	Ref
1982	Whitaker Racing	7	Olds	DAY	RCH	BRI	MAR	DAR	HCY; 16	SBO	CRW	RCH	LGY	DOV	**HCY**; 1	CLT; 3	ASH; 5	HCY	SBO	CAR; 30	CRW; 3	SBO	HCY	LGY	IRP; 1		HCY; 4	RCH; 2											11th	1692	
1982	Whitaker Racing	98	Olds																							**BRI**; 3*			MAR; 21										11th	1692	
1982	Whitaker Racing	7	Pontiac																											CLT; 33	HCY	MAR							11th	1692	
1983	Whitaker Racing	7	Olds	DAY; 5*				MAR; 2	NWS; 3		GPS; 6	LGY	DOV; 25	BRI; 1*	**CLT**; 39	SBO	HCY	ROU	SBO; 4	ROU	CRW	ROU	SBO	HCY	LGY	IRP; 8*	GPS	BRI; 4	HCY	DAR	RCH; 1	NWS	SBO	MAR; 2	ROU	CLT; 23*	HCY; 8*	MAR	18th	2512	
1983	Whitaker Racing	98	Olds		RCH; 18																																		18th	2512	
1983	Whitaker Racing	52	Pontiac			CAR; 26																																	18th	2512	
1983	Whitaker Racing	7	Pontiac				HCY; 2			SBO; 7*																													18th	2512	
1984	Whitaker Racing	7	Olds	DAY	RCH	CAR; 7	HCY																																22nd	1630	
1984	Lindy White Racing	1	Pontiac					MAR; 27		ROU; 23	NSV	LGY	MLW			SBO; 22	HCY	ROU	SBO; 22	ROU	HCY	IRP; 1*	LGY	SBO	**BRI**; 1*	DAR	RCH; 21	NWS		HCY; 19		MAR; 1*							22nd	1630	
1984	Lindy White Racing	1	Olds						DAR; 34					DOV; 16	CLT; 5														CLT; 7		CAR; 32								22nd	1630	
1985		84	Pontiac	DAY; 5																																			27th	1068	
1985	Beauregard Racing	39	Pontiac		CAR; 24																																		27th	1068	
1985	Lindy White Racing	1	Pontiac			HCY; 22		MAR; 5																															27th	1068	
1985	Lindy White Racing	1	Buick				BRI; 26						CLT; 42	SBO	HCY	ROU	IRP; 9	SBO; 23	LGY	HCY	MLW	BRI	DAR	RCH	NWS	ROU													27th	1068	
1985		06	Pontiac						DAR; 31	SBO	LGY	DOV																											27th	1068	
1985	Whitaker Racing	7	Olds																								CLT; 29	HCY	CAR; 31	MAR									27th	1068	
1986	Whitaker Racing	7	Pontiac	DAY; 8	CAR; 34	HCY	MAR; 1	BRI; 1*																															24th	1640	
1986	Whitaker Racing	77	Buick						DAR; 34	SBO	LGY	JFC	DOV	CLT; 35	SBO	HCY	ROU	IRP; 27	SBO	RAL	OXF; 39	SBO	HCY	LGY	ROU	BRI; 16	DAR; 2	RCH	**DOV**; 1*			CLT; 31	CAR; 1*	MAR					24th	1640	
1986	Shepherd Racing	17	Buick																											MAR; 16	ROU								24th	1640	
1987	Shepherd Racing	77	Buick	DAY; 5	HCY	MAR																																	24th	1689	
1987	Shepherd Racing	97	Buick				DAR; 10	BRI; 1	LGY	SBO	CLT; 9	DOV; 4	IRP	ROU	JFC				RAL; 1	LGY	ROU	BRI; 28	JFC	DAR; 2	RCH; 23	DOV; 20		CLT; 38	CAR; 1	MAR									24th	1689	
1987	Shaw Racing	68	Pontiac													OXF; 39	SBO	HCY																					24th	1689	
1987	Burnette Racing	09	Olds																								MAR; 32												24th	1689	
1988	Shepherd Racing	97	Buick	DAY; 44	HCY; 24	CAR; 8	MAR	DAR; 32			NZH; 28	SBO	NSV	CLT; 8	DOV; 29	ROU	LAN	LVL	MYB; 30					IRP; 1	ROU	BRI	DAR; 5	RCH; 32	DOV; 3	MAR	CLT; 42								28th	2193	
1988	Sweeney Racing	05	Chevy						BRI; 29	LNG																													28th	2193	
1988	Shaw Racing	68	Pontiac																	OXF; 17	SBO	HCY	LNG																28th	2193	
1988	Shepherd Racing	97	Chevy																													CAR; 16							28th	2193	
1988	Hensley Racing	63	Chevy																														MAR; 6						28th	2193	
1989	Shepherd Racing	97	Chevy	DAY; 15	CAR	MAR	HCY	DAR	BRI	NZH	SBO	LAN	NSV	CLT	DOV	ROU	LVL	VOL	MYB	SBO	HCY	DUB																	52nd	478	
1989	Pearson Racing	90	Buick																				IRP; 10	ROU	**BRI**; 27														52nd	478	
1989	Shepherd Racing	97	Pontiac																							DAR; 38	RCH	DOV	MAR										52nd	478	
1989	Edwards Racing	09	Ford																											CLT; 37	CAR; 40								52nd	478	
1989	Huffman Racing	77	Buick																													MAR; 6							52nd	478	
1990	Shepherd Racing	97	Ford	DAY; 44	RCH	CAR	MAR																								CLT; 36	NHA	CAR; 3						34th	1171	
1990	Huffman Racing	77	Olds					HCY; 24	DAR	BRI	LAN	SBO																											34th	1171	
1990	Falcon Racing	9	Chevy										NZH; 4	HCY	CLT; 39	DOV; 35	ROU	VOL	MYB; 29		NHA; 4	SBO	DUB	IRP; 26	ROU	BRI	DAR; 6	RCH	DOV	MAR				MAR; 31					34th	1171	
1990	Falcon Racing	18	Chevy																	OXF; 36																			34th	1171	
1991	Shepherd Racing	97	Ford	DAY; 7	RCH; 6	CAR; 29	MAR	VOL	HCY	DAR; 35	BRI; 31	LAN	SBO	NZH; 35	CLT; 30	DOV; 28	ROU	HCY	MYB	GLN; 26	OXF	NHA; 39	SBO	DUB	IRP; 32	ROU	BRI; 27	DAR; 35	RCH; 5	DOV	CLT; 41	NHA	CAR; 36	MAR					32nd	1298	
1992	Shepherd Racing	97	Ford	DAY; 43	CAR	RCH	ATL; 5	MAR	DAR; 28	BRI	HCY	LAN	DUB	NZH																									37th	1103	
1992	Shepherd Racing	21	Ford												CLT; 3	DOV	ROU	MYB	GLN	VOL	NHA; 28	TAL	IRP; 6	ROU	MCH; 33	NHA; 43	BRI; 14	DAR; 7	RCH	DOV; Wth	CLT; 29	MAR	CAR	HCY					37th	1103	
1993	Shepherd Racing	21	Ford	DAY	CAR	RCH	DAR	BRI	HCY	ROU	MAR	NZH	CLT	DOV	MYB	GLN	MLW	TAL	IRP	MCH; 25	NHA	BRI	DAR	RCH	DOV	ROU	CLT	MAR	CAR	HCY	ATL								96th	88	
1994	Shepherd Racing	21	Ford	DAY; 7	CAR; 13	RCH	ATL; DNQ	MAR	DAR; 19	HCY	BRI; 25	ROU	NHA	NZH	CLT; 39	DOV	MYB	GLN	MLW	SBO	TAL; 17	HCY	IRP	MCH	BRI	DAR; 19	RCH; 37	DOV	CLT; DNQ	MAR	CAR								45th	780	
1995	Shepherd Racing	21	Ford	DAY	CAR; 5	RCH; 37	ATL; 15	NSV	DAR; 36	BRI	HCY	NHA	NZH	CLT; 36	DOV	MYB	GLN	MLW	TAL	SBO	IRP	MCH; 11	BRI	DAR	RCH	DOV	CLT; 6	CAR; DNQ	HOM										45th	715	
1996	Bobby Jones Racing	50	Ford	DAY	CAR	RCH	ATL	NSV	DAR	BRI	HCY	NZH	CLT	DOV	SBO	MYB	GLN	MLW	NHA	TAL	IRP	MCH; 41	BRI; 36	DAR	RCH	DOV	CLT	CAR	HOM										83rd	95	
1997	Bobby Jones Racing	50	Pontiac	DAY	CAR	RCH	ATL	LVS	DAR	HCY	TEX	BRI; 16	NSV	TAL	NHA	NZH	CLT; 40	DOV	SBO	GLN	MLW	MYB	GTY	IRP															115th	43	
1997	Shepherd Racing	07	Pontiac																						MCH; 32	BRI	DAR	RCH	DOV										115th	43	
1997	Shepherd Racing	07	Chevy																											CLT; DNQ	CAL	CAR	HOM						115th	43	
1998	Martin Motorsports	92	Chevy	DAY	CAR	LVS	NSV	DAR	BRI	TEX; 32	HCY	TAL	NHA	NZH	CLT	DOV	RCH	PPR	GLN	MLW	MYB	CAL	SBO	IRP	MCH	BRI	DAR	RCH	DOV	CLT	GTY	CAR							111th	67	
1998	Shepherd Racing	07	Pontiac																														ATL; DNQ	HOM; DNQ					111th	67	
1999	High Tech Performance	07	Chevy	DAY; DNQ	CAR	LVS; DNQ	ATL	DAR	TEX	NSV	BRI	TAL	CAL	NHA	RCH	NZH	CLT	DOV	SBO	GLN	MLW	MYB	PPR	GTY	IRP	MCH	BRI	DAR	RCH	DOV									94th	134	
1999	Whitaker Racing	7	Chevy																												CLT; DNQ								94th	134	
1999	Xpress Motorsports	61	Pontiac																													CAR; 10	MEM	PHO					94th	134	
1999	Whitaker Racing	76	Chevy																																HOM; DNQ				94th	134	
2000	Emerald Performance Group	19	Chevy	DAY	CAR	LVS	ATL	DAR; DNQ	BRI	TEX	NSV	TAL	CAL	RCH	NHA	CLT	DOV	SBO	MYB	GLN	MLW	NZH	PPR	GTY	IRP														NA	-	
2000	Jarrett/Favre Motorsports	11	Chevy																							MCH; DNQ	BRI	DAR	RCH	DOV	CLT	CAR	MEM	PHO	HOM				NA	-	
2001	Kimberlee Smith	89	Ford	DAY	CAR	LVS	ATL	DAR	BRI	TEX	NSH	TAL	CAL	RCH	NHA	NZH	CLT	DOV	KEN	MLW	GLN	CHI	GTY	PPR	IRP	MCH	BRI	DAR	RCH	DOV	KAN	CLT	MEM	PHO	CAR	HOM; DNQ			NA	-	
2003	Davis Motorsports	0	Chevy	DAY	CAR; 40	LVS; DNQ	DAR; 27	BRI; 39	TEX; 33	TAL; 11	NSH	CAL; 41	RCH; 35	GTY	NZH	CLT; DNQ																							53rd	727	
2003	Davis Motorsports	70	Chevy														DOV; 38	NSH	KEN; 42	MLW; DNQ	DAY	CHI	NHA; 37	PPR	IRP	MCH	BRI												53rd	727	
2003	Victory in Jesus Racing	89	Ford																									DAR; 42	RCH; DNQ	DOV; DNQ		CLT; 40	MEM			CAR; DNQ			53rd	727	
2003	Victory in Jesus Racing	9	Ford																												KAN; DNQ			ATL; 41	PHO; 40		HOM; DNQ		53rd	727	
2004	Ware Racing Enterprises	57	Dodge	DAY	CAR	LVS	DAR	BRI; 40	TEX																														117th	104	
2004	Shepherd Racing Ventures	89	Ford							NSH; DNQ	TAL	CAL	GTY																										117th	104	
2004	Ware Racing Enterprises	51	Ford											RCH; 34	NZH																								117th	104	
2004	PF2 Motorsports	94	Chevy													CLT; DNQ	DOV	NSH	KEN	MLW	DAY	CHI	NHA	PPR	IRP	MCH													117th	104	
2004	Ware Racing Enterprises	51	Dodge																								BRI; DNQ												117th	104	
2004	Ware Racing Enterprises	57	Chevy																									CAL; DNQ	RCH										117th	104	
2004	MacDonald Motorsports	71	Chevy																											DOV; DNQ									117th	104	
2004	Davis Motorsports	0	Chevy																												KAN; DNQ								117th	104	
2004	Shepherd Racing Ventures	89	Dodge																													CLT; DNQ	MEM	ATL	PHO	DAR	HOM		117th	104	
2006	Davis Motorsports	0	Chevy	DAY	CAL	MXC	LVS	ATL	BRI	TEX	NSH	PHO	TAL	RCH	DAR; DNQ	CLT; 41	DOV; 43	NSH; 40	KEN; 42	MLW	DAY	CHI				IRP; 41	GLN	MCH	BRI	CAL	RCH	DOV	KAN	CLT	MEM	TEX	PHO		95th	194	
2006	Day Enterprise Racing	05	Chevy																				NHA; 42	MAR	GTY														95th	194	
2006	Jay Robinson Racing	49	Ford																																			HOM; DNQ	95th	194	
2007	D.D.L. Motorsports	01	Chevy	DAY	CAL; 41	MXC	LVS	ATL	BRI	NSH; 42	TEX	PHO; 40	TAL; 42	RCH	DAR; 43	CLT																							51st	829	
2007	Faith Motorsports	89	Dodge														DOV; 38	NSH; 41	KEN; 42	MLW	NHA; 42	DAY	CHI; 42	GTY; 39	IRP; 40	CGV; 38	GLN; 39	MCH; 41	BRI; 43	CAL; 39	RCH; DNQ	DOV; 38	KAN; DNQ	CLT; 43	MEM; DNQ	TEX; 39	PHO; DNQ	HOM; 41	51st	829	
2008	Faith Motorsports	89	Dodge	DAY; DNQ	CAL; 37	LVS; 40	ATL; 41	BRI; 37	NSH; 38	TEX; 42	PHO; 34	MXC; DNQ	TAL; 13	RCH; 28	DAR; 16	CLT; 37	DOV; 22	NSH; 24	KEN; 43	MLW; 37	NHA; 25	DAY; 31	CHI; DNQ	GTY; 37	IRP; 37			MCH; 26	BRI; DNQ	CAL; 34	RCH; 36	DOV; 22	KAN; 24	CLT; DNQ	MEM; 37	TEX; DNQ	PHO; DNQ	HOM; DNQ	29th	1844	
2008	Faith Motorsports	89	Chevy																							CGV; 37	GLN; 24												29th	1844	
2009	Faith Motorsports	89	Chevy	DAY; 39	CAL; 19	LVS; 13	BRI; 34	TEX; 28	NSH; 31	PHO; 35	TAL; 23	RCH; 36	DAR; 31	CLT; DNQ	DOV; 22	NSH; 17	KEN; 25	MLW; DNQ	NHA; DNQ	DAY; 32	CHI; DNQ	GTY; DNQ	IRP; 17	IOW; 19	GLN; 21	MCH; DNQ	BRI; DNQ	CGV; DNQ	ATL; DNQ	RCH; DNQ	DOV; 21	KAN; DNQ	CAL; 33	CLT; DNQ	MEM; 34	TEX; 32	PHO; DNQ	HOM; DNQ	30th	1742	
2010	Faith Motorsports	89	Chevy	DAY; 22	CAL; DNQ	LVS; DNQ	BRI; 35	NSH; 40	PHO; 39	TEX; DNQ	TAL; 30	RCH; 36	DAR; DNQ	DOV; 37	CLT; 36	NSH; 35	KEN; 37	ROA; 19	NHA; 22	DAY; 40							BRI; DNQ			RCH; 41				CLT; DNQ		TEX; DNQ			28th	1865	
2010	Shepherd Racing Ventures with Richard Childress Racing	21	Chevy																		CHI; 25	GTY; 21	IRP; 23	IOW; 35	GLN; 32	MCH; 37		CGV; 35	ATL		DOV; 30	KAN; 37	CAL; 28		GTY; 18		PHO; 31	HOM; 26	28th	1865	
2011	Faith Motorsports	89	Chevy	DAY; 26	PHO; 33	LVS; 18	BRI; 31	CAL; 23	TEX; 37	TAL; 30	NSH; 28	RCH; 28	DAR; 22	DOV; 26	IOW; 20	CLT; 24	CHI; 25	MCH; 34	ROA; 35	DAY; 38	KEN; 34	NHA; 21	NSH; 32	IRP; 32	IOW; 32	GLN; 34	CGV; 42	BRI; 34	ATL; 25	RCH; 24	CHI; 28	DOV; 25	KAN; 27	CLT; 25	TEX; 28	PHO; 28	HOM; 43		21st	504	
2012	Shepherd Racing Ventures	89	Chevy	DAY; DNQ	PHO; 38	LVS; 22	BRI; DNQ	CAL; 34	TEX; DNQ	RCH; 36	TAL; 35	DAR; 22	IOW; 31	CLT; 37	DOV; 29	MCH; 33	ROA; 36	KEN; 35	DAY	NHA; 32	CHI; 34	IND; DNQ	IOW; 35	GLN; 33	CGV	BRI; DNQ	ATL; 34	RCH; DNQ	CHI; 32	KEN; 31	DOV; DNQ	CLT; DNQ	KAN; 32	TEX; DNQ	PHO; 35	HOM; DNQ			29th	239	
2013	Shepherd Racing Ventures	89	Dodge	DAY; DNQ	PHO	LVS					TAL; 35	DAR	CLT						DAY; 40																				52nd	64	
2013	Shepherd Racing Ventures	89	Chevy				BRI; DNQ	CAL	TEX	RCH; DNQ				DOV; 36	IOW; DNQ	MCH	ROA	KEN; 35		NHA; DNQ	CHI	IND; DNQ	IOW; 35	GLN; 35	MOH	BRI; DNQ	ATL; 36	RCH; DNQ	CHI; DNQ	KEN	DOV; 27	KAN	CLT	TEX; DNQ	PHO; DNQ	HOM			52nd	64	
2014	Shepherd Racing Ventures	89	Chevy	DAY	PHO	LVS	BRI	CAL	TEX	DAR	RCH	TAL	IOW	CLT	DOV; 37	MCH; DNQ	ROA	KEN	DAY	NHA	CHI	IND	IOW; 36	GLN	MOH	BRI; 39	ATL; 35	RCH; 36	CHI; DNQ	KEN; 36	DOV; 35	KAN; DNQ	CLT; DNQ	TEX; DNQ	PHO; 37	HOM			47th	54	
2015	Shepherd Racing Ventures	89	Chevy	DAY	ATL; 40	LVS; 37	PHO; DNQ	CAL	TEX	BRI; 38	RCH; DNQ	TAL	IOW	CLT	DOV; 39	MCH	CHI; 37	DAY; 39	KEN; 38	NHA; 36	IND; 38	IOW; 37	GLN; DNQ	MOH; 37	BRI; 38	ROA; 39	DAR; 35	RCH; DNQ	CHI; DNQ	KEN; 33	DOV; 33	CLT; 37	KAN; 35	TEX; 35	PHO; DNQ	HOM; DNQ			34th	134	
2015	Shepherd Racing Ventures	40	Chevy																				GLN; 38																34th	134	
2016	Shepherd Racing Ventures	89	Chevy	DAY; 36	ATL; 37	LVS; 39	PHO; 39	CAL; DNQ	TEX	BRI; DNQ	RCH; 39	TAL; 39	DOV; 36	CLT; DNQ	POC; 35	MCH; 36	IOW; 37	DAY; 35	KEN; 37	NHA; 39	IND; 37	IOW; 36	GLN	MOH	BRI; 39	ROA; 37	DAR; 34	RCH; DNQ	CHI; 34	KEN; 38	DOV; 34	CLT; 39	KAN; DNQ	TEX; 39	PHO; DNQ	HOM; DNQ			36th	94	
2017	Shepherd Racing Ventures	89	Chevy	DAY; DNQ	ATL; DNQ	LVS; DNQ	PHO; 36	CAL	TEX	BRI; 39	RCH; DNQ	TAL; 35	CLT	DOV; 38	POC; 38	MCH; 40	IOW; 39	DAY	KEN; DNQ	NHA; 37	IND; 39	IOW; 38	GLN	MOH; 40	BRI; DNQ	ROA	DAR; 37	RCH; DNQ	CHI; 38	KEN; 37	DOV; 32	CLT; 38	KAN; 37	TEX; 39	PHO; 34	HOM; DNQ			56th	26	
2018	Shepherd Racing Ventures	89	Chevy	DAY; DNQ	ATL; 38	LVS; 37	PHO; 37	CAL; 38	TEX; 38	BRI; DNQ	RCH; 39	TAL; DNQ	DOV; 38	CLT; DNQ	POC; DNQ	MCH; 38	IOW; 39	CHI; DNQ	DAY	KEN; 38	NHA; 39	IOW; 38	GLN	MOH; 38	BRI; 39	ROA	DAR; 38	IND; 32	LVS	RCH; 40	CLT	DOV; 38	KAN; DNQ	TEX; 39	PHO; 39	HOM			60th	24	
2019	Shepherd Racing Ventures	89	Chevy	DAY	ATL; 35	LVS; 33	PHO; 34	CAL; 31	TEX; DNQ	BRI; 35	RCH; Wth	TAL	DOV; 35	CLT	POC; 35	MCH	IOW; 35	CHI; DNQ	DAY	KEN; 34	NHA	IOW; 36	GLN	MOH	BRI; DNQ	ROA	DAR; 37	IND; 36	LVS	RCH	CLT	DOV	KAN	TEX	PHO	HOM			61st	29	

==== Camping World Truck Series ====
NASCAR Camping World Truck Series results
Year	Team	No.	Make	1	2	3	4	5	6	7	8	9	10	11	12	13	14	15	16	17	18	19	20	21	22	23	24	25	26	NCWTC	Pts	Ref
1997	Mike Colabucci	13	Chevy	WDW	TUS	HOM	PHO	POR	EVG	I70	NHA	TEX	BRI	NZH; 28	MLW	LVL	CNS	HPT	IRP	FLM	NSV	GLN	RCH	MAR	SON	MMR	CAL	PHO	LVS	118th	79	
2000	Conely Racing	7	Chevy	DAY; 32	HOM; 17	PHO	MMR	MAR	PIR																					47th	465	
2000	Team 23 Racing	23	Chevy							GTY; DNQ	MEM	PPR	EVG	TEX	KEN	GLN	MLW	NHA	NZH	MCH	IRP; DNQ									47th	465	
2000	Black Tip Racing	69	Chevy																			NSV; 32	CIC							47th	465	
2000	Hover Motorsports	80	Ford																					RCH; DNQ	DOV; DNQ	TEX; DNQ	CAL			47th	465	
2001	Genzman Racing	21	Ford	DAY; 11	HOM	MMR																								26th	1146	
2001	Shepherd Racing	21	Ford				MAR; 36	GTY	DAR; 21	PPR	DOV; 24	TEX; 21	MEM; 29	MLW	KAN; 32	KEN; 31	NHA; 17	IRP; 33	NSH; 26	CIC; 33	NZH; 28	RCH; 21	SBO; 27	TEX	LVS	PHO; 30	CAL			26th	1146	
2002	Shepherd Racing	21	Ford	DAY; DNQ	DAR; 34	MAR; 33	GTY; 36	PPR; 34	DOV; 32	TEX; 31	MEM; 35	MLW		KEN; DNQ		MCH	IRP	NSH; 35	RCH; 17	TEX	SBO	LVS; 29	CAL; 28	PHO; 33	HOM; 32					24th	974	
2002	Ware Racing Enterprises	81	Dodge										KAN; 32																	24th	974	
2002	Ware Racing Enterprises	51	Dodge												NHA; 30															24th	974	
2003	Shepherd Racing	21	Ford	DAY; 26	DAR; 24	MMR	MAR; 35	CLT; 29	DOV; 26	TEX	MEM; 33	MLW; 33	KAN; 34	KEN; 28	GTY	MCH	IRP; 34	NSH; 25	BRI; 29	RCH	NHA; 33	CAL	LVS	SBO	TEX	MAR; 29	PHO; 36	HOM; 36		28th	991	
2004	RAW Racing	72	Chevy	DAY	ATL	MAR; QL^{†}	MFD	CLT	DOV	TEX	MEM	MLW	KAN	KEN	GTW	MCH	IRP	NSH	BRI	RCH	NHA	LVS	CAL	TEX	MAR	PHO	DAR	HOM		NA	-	
2007	Key Motorsports	44	Chevy	DAY	CAL; 34	ATL; 33	MAR	KAN	CLT	MFD																				73rd	201	
2007	Green Light Racing	06	Chevy								DOV; 29	TEX	MCH	MLW	MEM	KEN	IRP	NSH	BRI	GTY	NHA	LVS	TAL	MAR	ATL	TEX	PHO	HOM		73rd	201	
2008	Key Motorsports	44	Chevy	DAY	CAL; 34	ATL	MAR	KAN	CLT	MFD	DOV	TEX	MCH	MLW	MEM	KEN	IRP	NSH	BRI	GTY	NHA	LVS	TAL	MAR	ATL	TEX	PHO	HOM		118th	0	
2013	Norm Benning Racing	75	Chevy	DAY	MAR	CAR	KAN	CLT	DOV	TEX	KEN	IOW	ELD	POC	MCH	BRI	MSP	IOW	CHI	LVS	TAL	MAR	TEX; 34	PHO	HOM					114th	0^{1}	
2015	MAKE Motorsports	1	Chevy	DAY	ATL; 27	MAR	KAN	CLT	DOV	TEX	GTW	IOW	KEN	ELD	POC	MCH	BRI	MSP	CHI	NHA	LVS	TAL	MAR	TEX	PHO	HOM				102nd	0^{1}	
^{†} - Qualified for Dana White

^{*} Season still in progress
^{1} Ineligible for series points

==== Daytona Dash Series ====
Daytona Dash Series results
Year	Team	No.	Make	1	2	3	4	5	6	7	8	9	10	11	12	13	14	NDDS	Pts	Ref
1985	N/A	44	Chevy	DAY	LAN	GRE	CLT	ODS	LAN	BIR	MMS	ROU; 1	SBO	STH	ODS	HCY	CLT; 4	49th	160	

=== ARCA Bondo/Mar-Hyde Series ===
(key) (Bold – Pole position awarded by qualifying time. Italics – Pole position earned by points standings or practice time. * – Most laps led.)

ARCA Bondo/Mar-Hyde Series results
Year	Team	No.	Make	1	2	3	4	5	6	7	8	9	10	11	12	13	14	15	16	17	18	19	20	ABSC	Pts	Ref
1985	Lindy White Racing	1	Buick	ATL	DAY	ATL	TAL	ATL	SSP	IRP; 9	CSP	FRS	IRP	OEF	ISF	DSF	TOL							122nd	-	
2000	Hover Motorsports	80	Ford	DAY	SLM	AND	CLT; 39	KIL	FRS	MCH; 36	POC; 7	TOL	KEN	BLN	POC; 6	WIN	ISF	KEN	DSF	SLM	CLT; DNQ	TAL	ATL; 28	47th	595	

Sporting positions
Preceded by Gene Glover	NASCAR Late Model Sportsman Division Champion; 1980	Succeeded by Tommy Ellis
