= Ed Whitaker =

American stock car racing team owner

- Born: June 27, 1939
- Died: August 22, 2014 (aged 75); Bristol, Virginia, U.S.
- Occupation: NASCAR team owner

Charles Edward (Ed) Whitaker (June 27, 1939 – August 22, 2014) was an American stock car team owner. A native of Bristol, Virginia, he fielded a team in the NASCAR Busch Series for 20 seasons, with drivers including Dale Earnhardt Jr., Mark Martin, Alan Kulwicki, and Davey Allison. Whitaker's team scored 28 wins in the series, with 20 of them by Harry Gant. Whitaker also fielded a car for six races in the Winston Cup Series between 1978 and 1980 with driver John Utsman.
