= 1995 Slick 50 300 =

16th race of the 1995 NASCAR Winston Cup Series

Race details
- Race 16 of 31 in the 1995 NASCAR Winston Cup Series
- The 1995 Slick 50 300 program cover, featuring Ricky Rudd.
- Date: July 9, 1995
- Official name: 3rd Annual Slick 50 300
- Location: Loudon, New Hampshire, New Hampshire International Speedway
- Course: Permanent racing facility
- Course length: 1.058 miles (1.704 km)
- Distance: 300 laps, 317.4 mi (510.805 km)
- Scheduled distance: 300 laps, 317.4 mi (510.805 km)
- Average speed: 107.029 miles per hour (172.246 km/h)

Pole position
Driver	Mark Martin	Roush Racing
- Time: 29.568

Most laps led
Driver	Jeff Gordon	Hendrick Motorsports
- Laps: 126

Winner
No. 28	Jeff Gordon	Hendrick Motorsports

Television in the United States
- Network: TNN
- Announcers: Mike Joy, Buddy Baker, Dick Berggren

Radio in the United States
- Radio: Motor Racing Network

The 1995 Slick 50 300 was the 16th stock car race of the 1995 NASCAR Winston Cup Series and the third iteration of the event. The race was held on Sunday, July 9, 1995, in Loudon, New Hampshire, at New Hampshire International Speedway, a 1.058-mile (1.703 km) permanent, oval-shaped, low-banked racetrack. The race took the scheduled 300 laps to complete. At race's end, Hendrick Motorsports driver Jeff Gordon would manage to dominate the late stages of the race to take his seventh career NASCAR Winston Cup Series victory and his fifth victory of the season. To fill out the top three, Wood Brothers Racing driver Morgan Shepherd and Roush Racing driver Mark Martin would finish second and third, respectively.

== Background ==
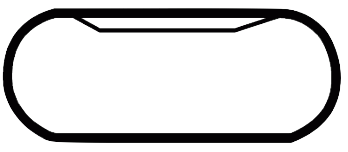
The layout of New Hampshire International Speedway, the venue where the race was held.

New Hampshire International Speedway is a 1.058-mile (1.703 km) oval speedway located in Loudon, New Hampshire which has hosted NASCAR racing annually since the early 1990s, as well as an IndyCar weekend and the oldest motorcycle race in North America, the Loudon Classic. Nicknamed "The Magic Mile", the speedway is often converted into a 1.6-mile (2.6 km) road course, which includes much of the oval. The track was originally the site of Bryar Motorsports Park before being purchased and redeveloped by Bob Bahre. The track is currently one of eight major NASCAR tracks owned and operated by Speedway Motorsports.

=== Entry list ===
- (R) denotes rookie driver.

#	Driver	Team	Make
1	Rick Mast	Precision Products Racing	Pontiac
2	Rusty Wallace	Penske Racing South	Ford
3	Dale Earnhardt	Richard Childress Racing	Chevrolet
4	Sterling Marlin	Morgan–McClure Motorsports	Chevrolet
5	Terry Labonte	Hendrick Motorsports	Chevrolet
6	Mark Martin	Roush Racing	Ford
7	Geoff Bodine	Geoff Bodine Racing	Ford
8	Jeff Burton	Stavola Brothers Racing	Ford
9	Lake Speed	Melling Racing	Ford
10	Ricky Rudd	Rudd Performance Motorsports	Ford
11	Brett Bodine	Junior Johnson & Associates	Ford
12	Derrike Cope	Bobby Allison Motorsports	Ford
15	Dick Trickle	Bud Moore Engineering	Ford
16	Ted Musgrave	Roush Racing	Ford
17	Darrell Waltrip	Darrell Waltrip Motorsports	Chevrolet
18	Bobby Labonte	Joe Gibbs Racing	Chevrolet
21	Morgan Shepherd	Wood Brothers Racing	Ford
22	Jimmy Hensley	Bill Davis Racing	Pontiac
23	Jimmy Spencer	Haas-Carter Motorsports	Ford
24	Jeff Gordon	Hendrick Motorsports	Chevrolet
25	Ken Schrader	Hendrick Motorsports	Chevrolet
26	Hut Stricklin	King Racing	Ford
27	Elton Sawyer	Junior Johnson & Associates	Ford
28	Dale Jarrett	Robert Yates Racing	Ford
29	Steve Grissom	Diamond Ridge Motorsports	Chevrolet
30	Michael Waltrip	Bahari Racing	Pontiac
31	Ward Burton	A.G. Dillard Motorsports	Chevrolet
32	Chuck Bown	Active Motorsports	Chevrolet
33	Robert Pressley (R)	Leo Jackson Motorsports	Chevrolet
37	John Andretti	Kranefuss-Haas Racing	Ford
40	Rich Bickle	Dick Brooks Racing	Pontiac
41	Ricky Craven (R)	Larry Hedrick Motorsports	Chevrolet
42	Kyle Petty	Team SABCO	Pontiac
43	Bobby Hamilton	Petty Enterprises	Pontiac
49	Eric Smith	Smith Racing	Ford
71	Dave Marcis	Marcis Auto Racing	Chevrolet
75	Todd Bodine	Butch Mock Motorsports	Ford
77	Bobby Hillin Jr.	Jasper Motorsports	Ford
87	Joe Nemechek	NEMCO Motorsports	Chevrolet
90	Mike Wallace	Donlavey Racing	Ford
94	Bill Elliott	Elliott-Hardy Racing	Ford
98	Jeremy Mayfield	Cale Yarborough Motorsports	Ford

== Qualifying ==
Qualifying was split into two rounds. The first round was held on Friday, July 7, at 4:00 PM EST. Each driver would have one lap to set a time. During the first round, the top 20 drivers in the round would be guaranteed a starting spot in the race. If a driver was not able to guarantee a spot in the first round, they had the option to scrub their time from the first round and try and run a faster lap time in a second round qualifying run, held on Saturday, July 8, at 11:00 AM EST. As with the first round, each driver would have one lap to set a time. For this specific race, positions 21-38 would be decided on time, and depending on who needed it, a select amount of positions were given to cars who had not otherwise qualified but were high enough in owner's points.

Mark Martin, driving for Roush Racing, would win the pole, setting a time of 29.568 and an average speed of 128.815 miles per hour (207.308 km/h).

Eric Smith was the only driver to fail to qualify.

=== Full qualifying results ===
Pos.	#	Driver	Team	Make	Time	Speed
1	6	Mark Martin	Roush Racing	Ford	29.568	128.815
2	33	Robert Pressley (R)	Leo Jackson Motorsports	Chevrolet	29.707	128.212
3	87	Joe Nemechek	NEMCO Motorsports	Chevrolet	29.745	128.048
4	94	Bill Elliott	Elliott-Hardy Racing	Ford	29.828	127.692
5	18	Bobby Labonte	Joe Gibbs Racing	Chevrolet	29.851	127.594
6	1	Rick Mast	Precision Products Racing	Ford	29.851	127.594
7	10	Ricky Rudd	Rudd Performance Motorsports	Ford	29.882	127.461
8	42	Kyle Petty	Team SABCO	Pontiac	29.893	127.414
9	30	Michael Waltrip	Bahari Racing	Pontiac	29.898	127.393
10	25	Ken Schrader	Hendrick Motorsports	Chevrolet	29.899	127.389
11	21	Morgan Shepherd	Wood Brothers Racing	Ford	29.928	127.265
12	15	Dick Trickle	Bud Moore Engineering	Ford	29.981	127.040
13	5	Terry Labonte	Hendrick Motorsports	Chevrolet	29.982	127.036
14	28	Dale Jarrett	Robert Yates Racing	Ford	29.984	127.028
15	98	Jeremy Mayfield	Cale Yarborough Motorsports	Ford	29.996	126.977
16	26	Hut Stricklin	King Racing	Ford	29.997	126.973
17	16	Ted Musgrave	Roush Racing	Ford	30.002	126.952
18	3	Dale Earnhardt	Richard Childress Racing	Chevrolet	30.006	126.935
19	41	Ricky Craven (R)	Larry Hedrick Motorsports	Chevrolet	30.039	126.795
20	2	Rusty Wallace	Penske Racing South	Ford	30.043	126.778
Failed to lock in Round 1
21	24	Jeff Gordon	Hendrick Motorsports	Chevrolet	29.907	127.355
22	7	Geoff Bodine	Geoff Bodine Racing	Ford	30.044	126.774
23	12	Derrike Cope	Bobby Allison Motorsports	Ford	30.047	126.761
24	71	Dave Marcis	Marcis Auto Racing	Chevrolet	30.054	126.732
25	27	Elton Sawyer	Junior Johnson & Associates	Ford	30.057	126.719
26	43	Bobby Hamilton	Petty Enterprises	Pontiac	30.077	126.635
27	31	Ward Burton	A.G. Dillard Motorsports	Chevrolet	30.090	126.580
28	75	Todd Bodine	Butch Mock Motorsports	Ford	30.103	126.526
29	37	John Andretti	Kranefuss-Haas Racing	Ford	30.122	126.446
30	8	Jeff Burton	Stavola Brothers Racing	Ford	30.144	126.354
31	4	Sterling Marlin	Morgan–McClure Motorsports	Chevrolet	30.149	126.333
32	17	Darrell Waltrip	Darrell Waltrip Motorsports	Chevrolet	30.178	126.211
33	40	Rich Bickle	Dick Brooks Racing	Pontiac	30.178	126.211
34	29	Steve Grissom	Diamond Ridge Motorsports	Chevrolet	30.198	126.128
35	90	Mike Wallace	Donlavey Racing	Ford	30.267	125.840
36	9	Lake Speed	Melling Racing	Ford	30.286	125.761
37	77	Bobby Hillin Jr.	Jasper Motorsports	Ford	30.297	125.715
38	22	Jimmy Hensley	Bill Davis Racing	Pontiac	30.383	125.360
Provisionals
39	11	Brett Bodine	Junior Johnson & Associates	Ford	-*	-*
40	23	Jimmy Spencer	Travis Carter Enterprises	Ford	-*	-*
41	32	Chuck Bown	Active Motorsports	Chevrolet	-*	-*
Failed to qualify
42	49	Eric Smith	Smith Racing	Ford	-*	-*
Official first round qualifying results
Official starting lineup

== Race results ==
Fin	St	#	Driver	Team	Make	Laps	Led	Status	Pts	Winnings
1	21	24	Jeff Gordon	Hendrick Motorsports	Chevrolet	300	126	running	185	$160,300
2	11	21	Morgan Shepherd	Wood Brothers Racing	Ford	300	0	running	170	$61,500
3	1	6	Mark Martin	Roush Racing	Ford	300	124	running	170	$54,650
4	13	5	Terry Labonte	Hendrick Motorsports	Chevrolet	300	3	running	165	$37,925
5	7	10	Ricky Rudd	Rudd Performance Motorsports	Ford	300	0	running	155	$35,125
6	20	2	Rusty Wallace	Penske Racing South	Ford	300	1	running	155	$30,925
7	23	12	Derrike Cope	Bobby Allison Motorsports	Ford	300	0	running	146	$26,125
8	17	16	Ted Musgrave	Roush Racing	Ford	300	0	running	142	$24,525
9	31	4	Sterling Marlin	Morgan–McClure Motorsports	Chevrolet	300	0	running	138	$27,925
10	10	25	Ken Schrader	Hendrick Motorsports	Chevrolet	300	0	running	134	$28,025
11	6	1	Rick Mast	Precision Products Racing	Ford	300	0	running	130	$24,025
12	40	23	Jimmy Spencer	Travis Carter Enterprises	Ford	300	0	running	127	$20,825
13	2	33	Robert Pressley (R)	Leo Jackson Motorsports	Chevrolet	300	0	running	124	$27,125
14	9	30	Michael Waltrip	Bahari Racing	Pontiac	300	18	running	126	$23,425
15	5	18	Bobby Labonte	Joe Gibbs Racing	Chevrolet	299	2	running	123	$28,425
16	26	43	Bobby Hamilton	Petty Enterprises	Pontiac	299	0	running	115	$17,775
17	32	17	Darrell Waltrip	Darrell Waltrip Motorsports	Chevrolet	299	0	running	112	$22,575
18	4	94	Bill Elliott	Elliott-Hardy Racing	Ford	299	0	running	109	$17,375
19	3	87	Joe Nemechek	NEMCO Motorsports	Chevrolet	299	0	running	106	$15,175
20	37	77	Bobby Hillin Jr.	Jasper Motorsports	Ford	299	0	running	103	$15,325
21	39	11	Brett Bodine	Junior Johnson & Associates	Ford	299	0	running	100	$26,450
22	18	3	Dale Earnhardt	Richard Childress Racing	Chevrolet	298	24	running	102	$43,350
23	25	27	Elton Sawyer	Junior Johnson & Associates	Ford	298	0	running	94	$21,250
24	36	9	Lake Speed	Melling Racing	Ford	298	0	running	91	$16,650
25	30	8	Jeff Burton	Stavola Brothers Racing	Ford	298	0	running	88	$21,650
26	15	98	Jeremy Mayfield	Cale Yarborough Motorsports	Ford	297	0	running	85	$16,250
27	16	26	Hut Stricklin	King Racing	Ford	297	0	running	82	$17,825
28	34	29	Steve Grissom	Diamond Ridge Motorsports	Chevrolet	297	0	running	79	$15,925
29	24	71	Dave Marcis	Marcis Auto Racing	Chevrolet	297	0	running	76	$15,725
30	14	28	Dale Jarrett	Robert Yates Racing	Ford	296	0	running	73	$26,925
31	19	41	Ricky Craven (R)	Larry Hedrick Motorsports	Chevrolet	296	0	running	70	$15,925
32	35	90	Mike Wallace	Donlavey Racing	Ford	294	0	running	67	$15,325
33	29	37	John Andretti	Kranefuss-Haas Racing	Ford	292	2	brakes	69	$14,725
34	12	15	Dick Trickle	Bud Moore Engineering	Ford	283	0	running	61	$17,125
35	22	7	Geoff Bodine	Geoff Bodine Racing	Ford	265	0	crash	58	$27,625
36	28	75	Todd Bodine	Butch Mock Motorsports	Ford	199	0	vibration	55	$16,925
37	8	42	Kyle Petty	Team SABCO	Pontiac	194	0	engine	52	$26,825
38	33	40	Rich Bickle	Dick Brooks Racing	Pontiac	189	0	engine	49	$26,575
39	27	31	Ward Burton	A.G. Dillard Motorsports	Chevrolet	162	0	crash	46	$11,575
40	41	32	Chuck Bown	Active Motorsports	Chevrolet	98	0	engine	43	$11,575
41	38	22	Jimmy Hensley	Bill Davis Racing	Pontiac	34	0	crash	40	$16,575
Official race results

Previous race: 1995 Pepsi 400	NASCAR Winston Cup Series; 1995 season	Next race: 1995 Miller Genuine Draft 500 (Pocono)
