= 1995 NASCAR Winston Cup Series =

American motorsport season

Seasons
- ← 1994 1996 →

The 1995 NASCAR Winston Cup Series was the 47th season of professional stock car racing in the United States and the 24th modern-era Cup series season. The season began on February 12 in Daytona Beach and concluded on November 12 at the Atlanta Motor Speedway. Jeff Gordon of Hendrick Motorsports won his first career championship.

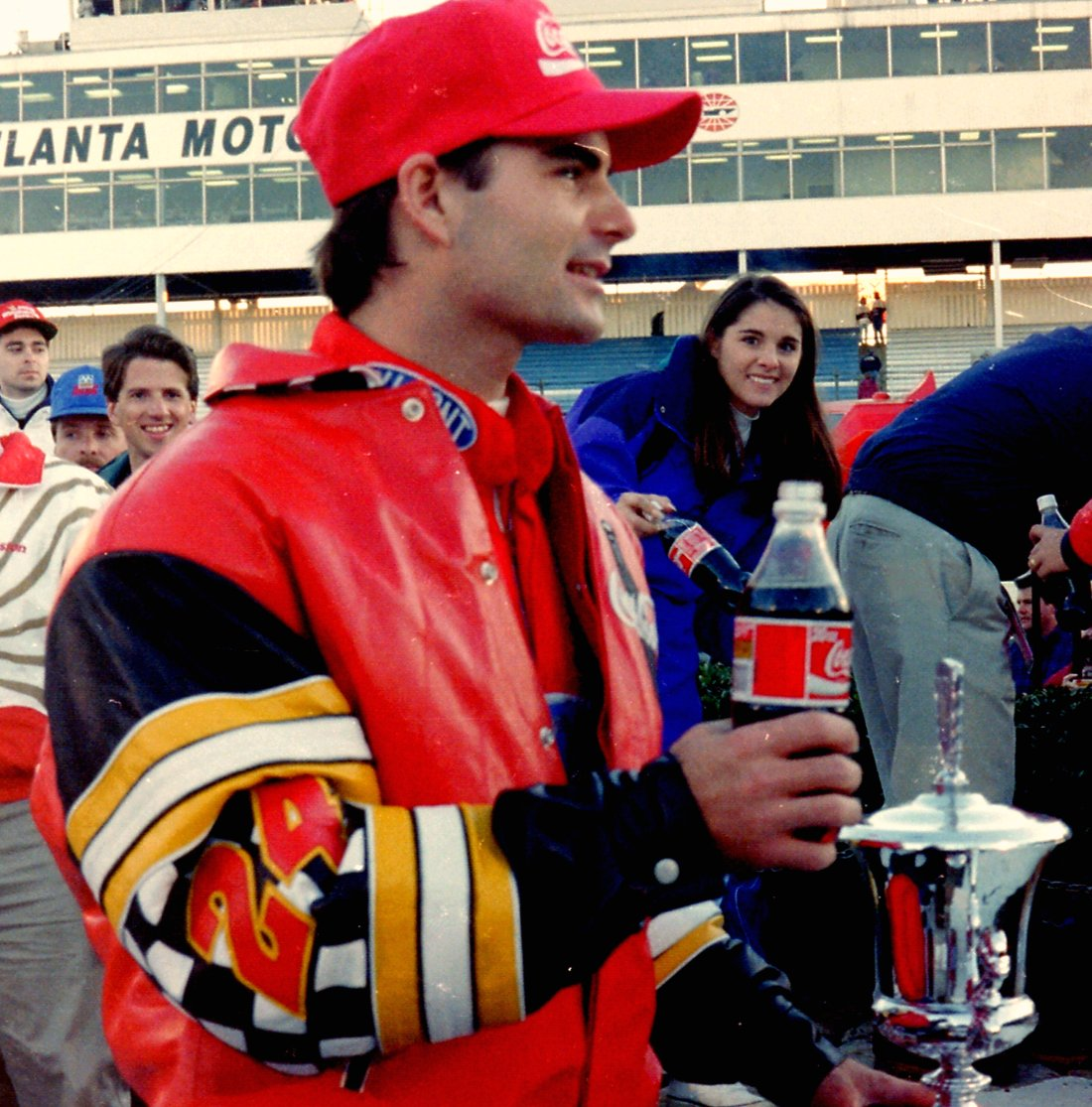
The 1995 Winston Cup Champion Jeff Gordon

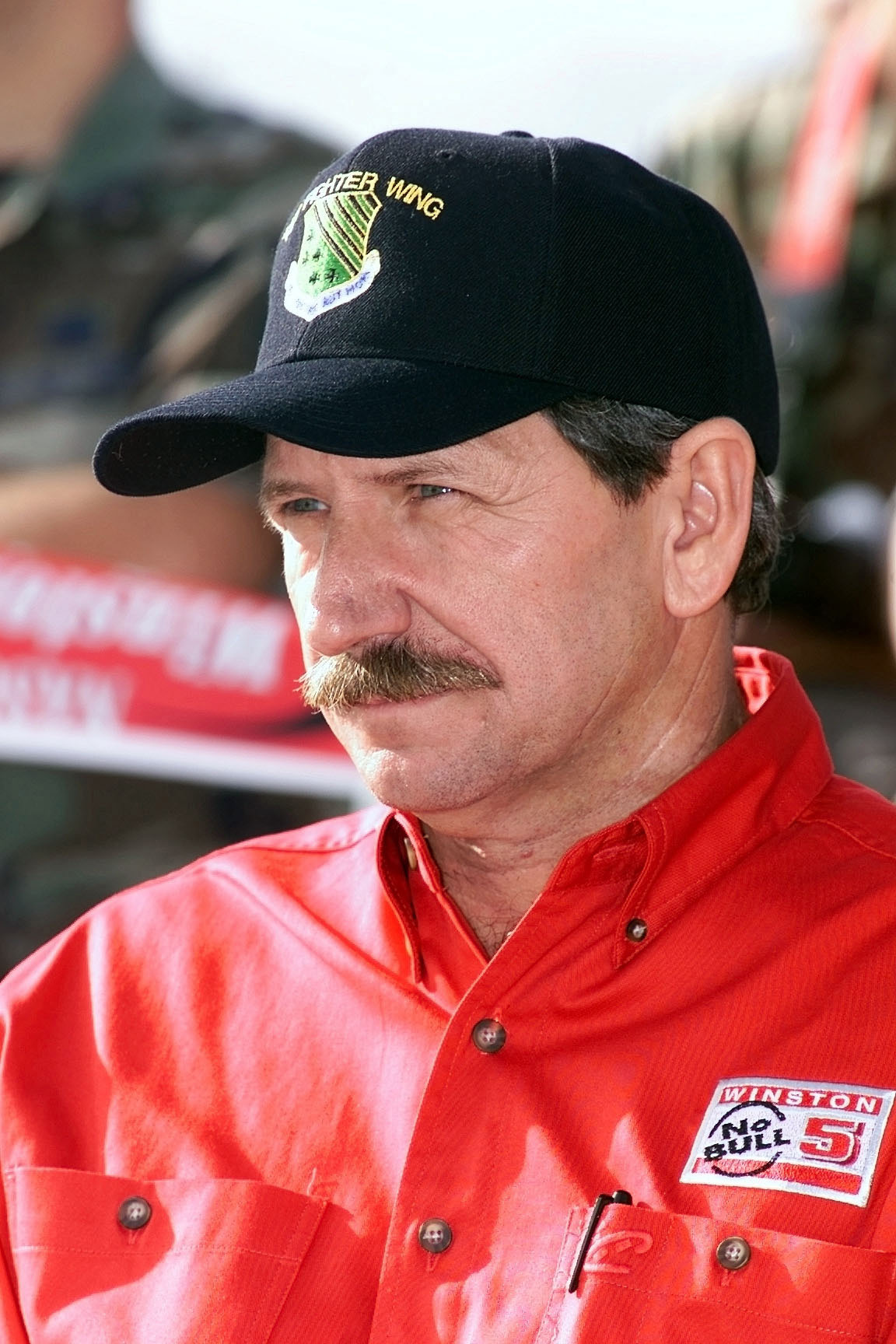
Dale Earnhardt finished second behind Gordon by 34 points.

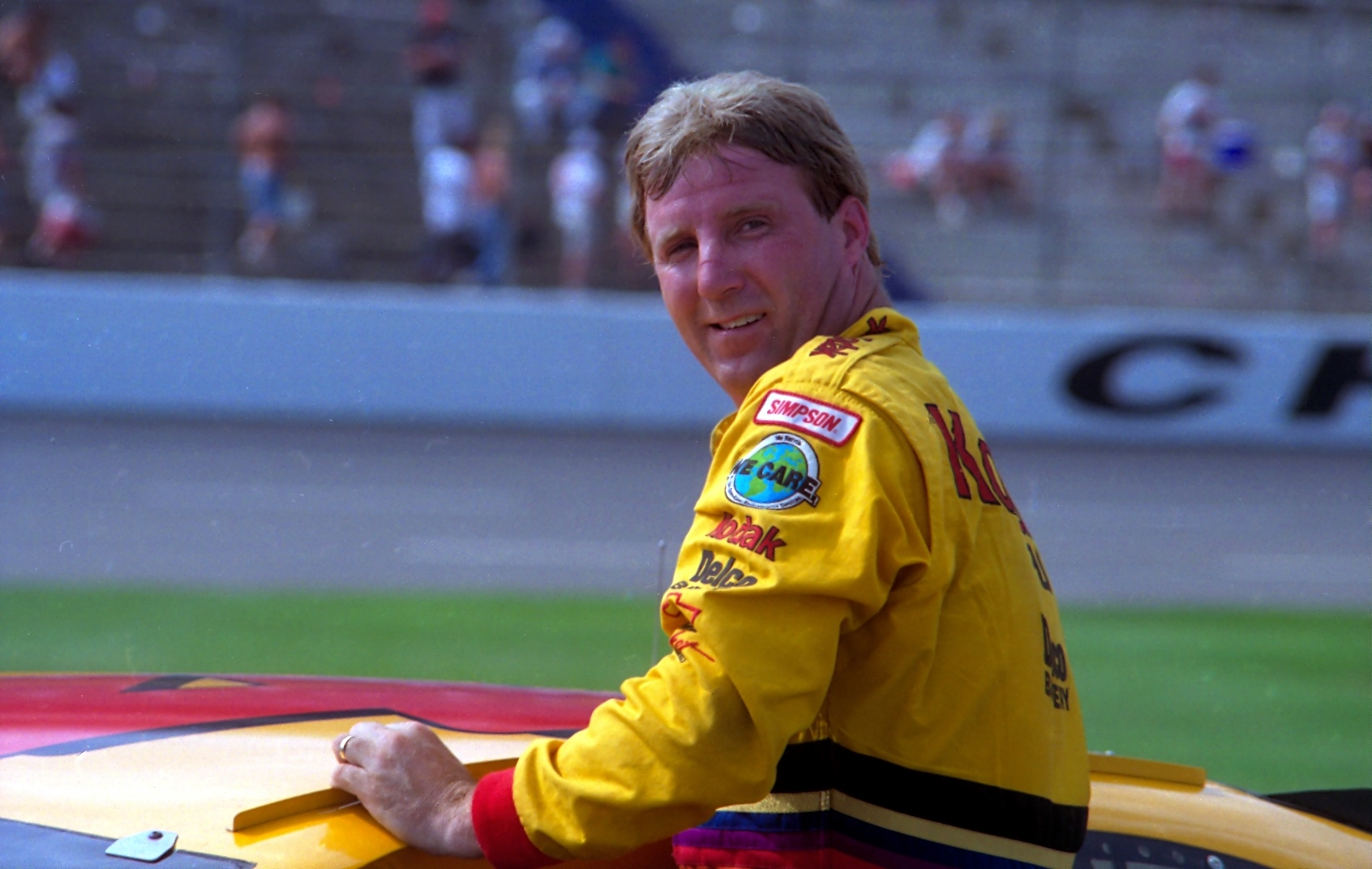
Sterling Marlin finished third in the championship.

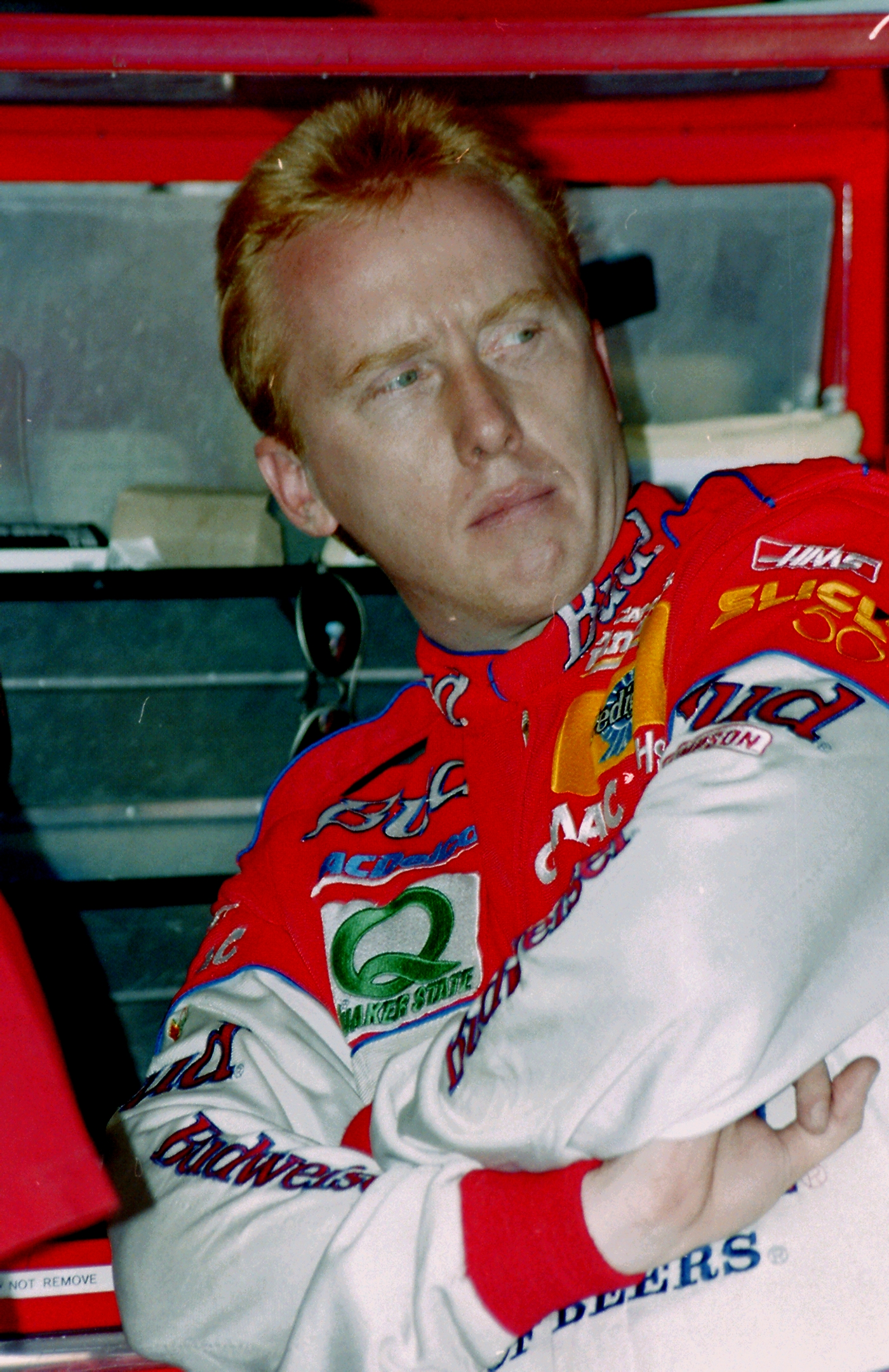
Ricky Craven, the Winston Cup Rookie of the Year.

== Overview ==
The major story heading into the 1995 season was Dale Earnhardt's attempt to make history. After winning his seventh Winston Cup Championship in 1994, Earnhardt tied Richard Petty's record for Cup Championships. Going into the 1995 season, Earnhardt had won four of the last five Winston Cup points titles, and was considered the favorite to win his eighth in 1995. Mark Martin, who finished second in the points to Earnhardt, was still considered a strong contender for the title. Former Winston Cup Champions Terry Labonte, Bill Elliott and Rusty Wallace were in the mix as well.

As the season progressed, the race for the series championship became a battle between the seven-time Winston Cup Champ Earnhardt, veteran journeyman and back-to-back Daytona 500 winner Sterling Marlin and the ascending Jeff Gordon. The majority of the spotlight soon shifted on the 24-year-old Gordon. Gordon, who had won two of 1994’s biggest races (Coca-Cola 600 and the Inaugural Brickyard 400), visited victory lane in three of the first six races of 1995. Gordon would become the most consistent driver of the season. During one stretch of the season, he rattled off 14 straight top ten finishes, winning four times during that stretch. Despite a late season challenge by Earnhardt, Gordon would win the season's championship by 34 points. In doing so, he became the youngest Winston Cup Champion of the modern era (post 1971). Gordon made light of this at the season ending banquet, toasting Earnhardt with a glass of milk instead of champagne.

However, there were several other major stories in 1995.

- 1995 saw the Lumina, which had been Chevrolet's official car in NASCAR since the 1989 Winston 500, being replaced by the new Chevrolet Monte Carlo. The Monte Carlo would prove to be the dominant car in 1995, winning 21 of the season's 31 races. After winning each of the season's first seven races, NASCAR gave advantages to the two other makes: Ford and Pontiac.
- In contrast to its GM counterpart, Pontiac continued to struggle. The manufacturer won only twice in 1995, and did not have a single driver in the top ten in points (12th place Michael Waltrip was the highest).
- Goodyear was the sole tire supplier in 1995, after winning the "tire war" against Hoosier. Despite three wins in 1994 with driver/owner Geoff Bodine, Hoosier decided to leave NASCAR after the 1994 season. Its reasoning, according to Hoosier president Bob Newton, was "to concentrate our efforts in short track racing, which remains our bread and butter."

== 1995 changes ==
- Robert Yates Racing: After a practice crash at Michigan International Speedway in August 1994, Ernie Irvan spent the rest of the 1994 season recuperating from his injuries. While Irvan continued to make great progress in his recovery, it was becoming clear that he would have to sit out the 1995 season. Thus, RYR began to search for a new driver to take over the #28 Ford. After securing a buyout from his contract at Joe Gibbs Racing, it was announced that Dale Jarrett would be the driver for 1995.
- Joe Gibbs Racing: After the departure of Dale Jarrett, Joe Gibbs Racing was forced to find a new driver for the #18 Chevy. With encouragement from General Motors, JGR signed Bobby Labonte, who left Bill Davis Racing,
- Elliott-Hardy Racing: After struggling the last two years driving for Junior Johnson, Bill Elliott formed his own team for 1995, sharing ownership with Georgia businessman Charles Hardy. Elliott would reunite with brothers Ernie and Dan, with whom he had great success during his time at Melling Racing. Elliott selected 94 as the number for his Ford and McDonald's as his sponsor. The number had been used by Bill's nephew Casey Elliott, before Casey was diagnosed with cancer (Casey would ultimately lose his battle with the disease in 1996).
- Junior Johnson: For 1995, Johnson was forced to look for new drivers and sponsors for both of his cars. Budweiser, the long time sponsor of the #11, left to sponsor the #25 at Hendrick Motorsports and Bill Elliott took the sponsor of the #27, McDonald's, to his new team. For the #11 team, Johnson replaced driver Elliott with Brett Bodine and got sponsorship from Lowe's. For the #27 car, sophomore Loy Allen Jr. took over for Jimmy Spencer with sponsorship from Hooters. Before the April Bristol race, Allen left the team. Various drivers drove the #27 for the rest of 1995; the majority of starts went to veteran Busch Series driver Elton Sawyer.
- King Racing: Bodine would be replaced by sprint car legend Steve Kinser. Kinser, who had won 14 World of Outlaws championships, had limited exposure to stock car racing; his only experience had been in the IROC series. After failing to qualify for the spring races at Bristol and North Wilkesboro, Kinser and the team mutually split. Kinser returned to the WoO series, while Hut Stricklin was hired to replace him in the 26 car.
- Larry Hedrick Motorsports: LHM was left without a driver and sponsor for 1995. Former Busch Grand National Series Champion Joe Nemechek left to start his own team, Rookie Ricky Craven would drive the #41 Chevy. Craven won the Rookie of the Year award in 1995.
- Diamond Ridge Motorsports: Former Busch Grand National champ Steve Grissom would return for a second Cup season.
- NEMCO Motorsports: As he had done en route to the 1992 Busch Grand National Series Championship, Joe Nemechek formed his own team in 1995.
- Leo Jackson Motorsports: Harry Gant called it a career after the 1994 season. BGN series regular Robert Pressley would replace Gant in the Skoal Bandit Chevy, and would also compete for Rookie of the Year for 1995.
- Bill Davis Racing: BDR found itself in a similar position to many teams, needing to replace both a driver (Bobby Labonte) and a sponsor. BDR hoped to find success with manufacturer Pontiac with driver Randy LaJoie. However, the combo experienced lackluster results, and LaJoie was fired in July. After going through several drivers, Davis settled on Ward Burton, who had been let go from the Alan Dillard Jr. owned team earlier in the year. Burton shocked the stock car world by winning his first career Cup Series race at the North Carolina Motor Speedway in October. LaJoie would also find success, winning the Busch Grand National Title in 1996 and 1997.
- Melling Racing: After running part-time for the last three seasons, Melling returned to full-time competition in 1995. Mississippian Lake Speed was hired to be driver and general manager of the team.
- Bud Moore: After Lake Speed left the team at the end of 1994, Bud Moore hired short track legend (and Sportscenter favorite) Dick Trickle to drive the #15 Ford.
- Travis Carter Motorsports: After struggling during the 1994 season, the team parted ways with driver Hut Stricklin. He would be replaced by Jimmy Spencer, who had won two races driving for Junior Johnson in 1994.
- Petty Enterprises: John Andretti, who had replaced Wally Dallenbach Jr. midway through 1994, did not return in 1995. Replacing Andretti would be Tennessee driver Bobby Hamilton.
- SABCO Racing: After Hamilton left for Petty Enterprises, owner Felix Sabates hired Greg Sacks to drive the #40 Pontiac. After a dismal 14-race stint, Sacks was let go. Several drivers took the reins of the #40, with most of the duties going to Rich Bickle. Sabates' other car, the #42 driven by Kyle Petty, had new colors for 1995.
- Jasper Motorsports: Owner D. K. Ulrich hired veteran open wheel and sports car driver Davy Jones to pilot the #77 Ford. Bobby Hillin Jr. replaced Jones beginning at the June Dover race.
- Kranefuss-Haas Racing: After racing part-time in 1994, the team co-owned by Michael Kranefuss and Carl Haas went full-time in 1995. Former CART driver John Andretti was selected to drive the #37 Ford.

== Teams and drivers ==
=== Complete schedule ===
Manufacturer	Team	No.	Race Driver	Crew Chief
Chevrolet	DarWal Inc.	17	Darrell Waltrip	Pete Peterson
Chevrolet	Diamond Ridge Motorsports	29	Steve Grissom	Bryant Frazier
Chevrolet	Hendrick Motorsports	5	Terry Labonte	Gary DeHart
Chevrolet	Hendrick Motorsports	24	Jeff Gordon	Ray Evernham
Chevrolet	Hendrick Motorsports	25	Ken Schrader	Ken Howes
Chevrolet	Joe Gibbs Racing	18	Bobby Labonte	Jimmy Makar
Chevrolet	Larry Hedrick Motorsports	41	Ricky Craven (R)	Rick Ren
Chevrolet	Leo Jackson Motorsports	33	Robert Pressley (R)	Charley Pressley
Chevrolet	Marcis Auto Racing	71	Dave Marcis	Bob Marcis
Chevrolet	Morgan-McClure Motorsports	4	Sterling Marlin	Tony Glover
Chevrolet	NEMCO Motorsports	87	Joe Nemechek	Mike Boerschinger
Chevrolet	Richard Childress Racing	3	Dale Earnhardt	Andy Petree
Ford	Bobby Allison Motorsports	12	Derrike Cope	Jimmy Fennig
Ford	Bud Moore Engineering	15	Dick Trickle	Donnie Wingo
Ford	Butch Mock Motorsports	75	Todd Bodine	Troy Selberg
Ford	Cale Yarborough Motorsports	98	Jeremy Mayfield	Tony Furr
Ford	Donlavey Racing	90	Mike Wallace	Junie Donlavey
Ford	Elliott-Hardy Racing	94	Bill Elliott	Tony Gibson 20; Mike Beam 11
Ford	Geoff Bodine Racing	7	Geoff Bodine	Paul Andrews
Ford	Jasper Motorsports	77	Davy Jones (R) 11	Paul Wise
Ford	Jasper Motorsports	77	Bobby Hillin Jr. 20	Paul Wise
Ford	Junior Johnson & Associates	11	Brett Bodine	Dean Combs
Ford	Junior Johnson & Associates	27	Loy Allen Jr. 6	Mike Hill
Ford	Junior Johnson & Associates	27	Jeff Purvis 1	Mike Hill
Ford	Junior Johnson & Associates	27	Elton Sawyer 22	Mike Hill
Ford	Junior Johnson & Associates	27	Jimmy Horton 1	Mike Hill
Ford	Junior Johnson & Associates	27	Greg Sacks 1	Mike Hill
Ford	King Racing	26	Steve Kinser (R) 7	Richard Broome
Ford	King Racing	26	Hut Stricklin 24	Richard Broome
Ford	Kranefuss-Haas Racing	37	John Andretti	Tim Brewer
Ford	Melling Racing	9	Lake Speed	Peter Sospenzo
Ford	Penske Racing South	2	Rusty Wallace	Robin Pemberton
Ford	Precision Products Racing	1	Rick Mast	Kevin Hamlin
Ford	Robert Yates Racing	28	Dale Jarrett	Larry McReynolds
Ford	Roush Racing	6	Mark Martin	Steve Hmiel
Ford	Roush Racing	16	Ted Musgrave	Howard Comstock
Ford	Rudd Performance Motorsports	10	Ricky Rudd	Bill Ingle
Ford	Travis Carter Enterprises	23	Jimmy Spencer	Cecil Gordon
Ford	Stavola Brothers Racing	8	Jeff Burton	Donnie Richeson
Ford	Wood Brothers Racing	21	Morgan Shepherd	Eddie Wood
Pontiac	Bahari Racing	30	Michael Waltrip	Doug Hewitt
Pontiac	Bill Davis Racing	22	Randy LaJoie (R) 14	Chris Hussey
Pontiac	Bill Davis Racing	22	Jimmy Hensley 6	Chris Hussey
Pontiac	Bill Davis Racing	22	Wally Dallenbach Jr. 1	Chris Hussey
Pontiac	Bill Davis Racing	22	Ward Burton 10	Chris Hussey
Pontiac	Dick Brooks Racing	40	Greg Sacks 14	Jeff Hammond
Pontiac	Dick Brooks Racing	40	Andy Hillenburg 1	Jeff Hammond
Pontiac	Dick Brooks Racing	40	Rich Bickle 10	Jeff Hammond
Pontiac	Dick Brooks Racing	40	Randy LaJoie (R) 1	Jeff Hammond
Pontiac	Dick Brooks Racing	40	Butch Leitzinger 1	Jeff Hammond
Pontiac	Dick Brooks Racing	40	Shane Hall 4	Jeff Hammond
Pontiac	Petty Enterprises	43	Bobby Hamilton	Robbie Loomis
Pontiac	Team SABCO	42	Kyle Petty	Keith Simmons

=== Limited schedule ===
Manufacturer	Team	No.	Race driver	Crew chief	Round(s)
Chevrolet	Active Motorsports	32	Mike Chase	Doug Williams	1
Chevrolet	Active Motorsports	32	Jimmy Hensley	Doug Williams	4
Chevrolet	Active Motorsports	32	Chuck Bown	Doug Williams	11
Chevrolet	Active Motorsports	32	Greg Sacks	Doug Williams	8
Chevrolet	Active Motorsports	32	Ed Berrier	Doug Williams	2
Chevrolet	Active Motorsports	32	Michael Ritch	Doug Williams	1
Chevrolet	A. G. Dillard Motorsports	31	Ward Burton	Philippe Lopez	21
Chevrolet	A. G. Dillard Motorsports	31	Greg Sacks	Philippe Lopez	4
Chevrolet	A. G. Dillard Motorsports	31	Jimmy Hensley	Philippe Lopez	3
Chevrolet	A. G. Dillard Motorsports	31	Gary Bradberry (R)	Philippe Lopez	2
Chevrolet	Canaska Racing	68	Ron Fellows		1
Chevrolet	Hendrick Motorsports	58	Jeff Purvis	Phil Hammer	1
Chevrolet	Hendrick Motorsports	59	Jack Sprague		1
Chevrolet	JTC Racing	45	Ron Hornaday Jr.		1
Chevrolet	O'Neil Racing	65	Steve Seligman		5
Chevrolet	Parker Racing	72	Tracy Leslie		1
Chevrolet	Phoenix Racing	44	Jeff Purvis	Marc Reno	11
Chevrolet	Phoenix Racing	51	Kerry Teague		1
Chevrolet	Marcis Auto Racing	72	Jim Sauter		1
Chevrolet	Russell Racing	70	Alan Russell		1
Chevrolet	Skillen Racing	14	Richard Brickhouse		1
Chevrolet	Waters Racing	79	Doug French		2
Chevrolet	Bradberry Racing	93	Gary Bradberry (R)		3
Chevrolet	Bradberry Racing	88	Gary Bradberry (R)		1
Ford	Robert Yates Racing	88	Ernie Irvan	Todd Parrott	4
Ford	A. J. Foyt Enterprises	50	A. J. Foyt		2
Ford	Barkdoll Racing	73	Phil Barkdoll		1
Ford	Bill Strait Motorsports	68	Bob Strait		1
Ford	Byers Racing	82	Terry Byers (R)		2
Ford	CPR Motorsports	99	Shawna Robinson		1
Ford	Cunningham Racing	67	Ken Bouchard		2
Ford	FILMAR Racing	81	Kenny Wallace	Gil Martin	20
Ford	H. L. Waters Racing	0	Delma Cowart		6
Ford	Hover Motorsports	80	Joe Ruttman		2
Ford	H. S. Die Racing Team	02	Tim Steele		1
Ford	Mark Rypien Motorsports	97	Chad Little	Gary Cogswell	5
Ford	Petty Brothers Racing	53	Ritchie Petty		2
Ford	Means Racing	52	Gary Bradberry (R)		4
Ford	Means Racing	52	Brad Teague		3
Ford	Means Racing	52	Randy MacDonald		1
Ford	Means Racing	62	Ronnie Sanders		1
Ford	Moroso Racing	20	Bobby Hillin Jr.		2
Ford	Norm Benning Racing	84	Norm Benning		1
Ford	Phoenix Air Racing	61	David Murry		1
Ford	RaDiUs Motorsports	66	Ben Hess	Sandy Jones	4
Ford	RaDiUs Motorsports	66	Butch Miller	Sandy Jones	1
Ford	RaDiUs Motorsports	67		Sandy Jones	
Ford	RaDiUs Motorsports	67	Terry Fisher		1
Ford	RaDiUs Motorsports	67	Johnny Chapman		1
Ford	RaDiUs Motorsports	76	Johnny Chapman		1
Ford	Sadler Brothers Racing	95	Doug Heveron		1
Ford	Sadler Brothers Racing	95	Jimmy Hensley		1
Ford	Sadler Brothers Racing	95	Loy Allen Jr.		2
Ford	Smith Racing	49	Eric Smith		5
Ford	Johnson Standridge Racing	47	Billy Standridge		8
Ford	Johnson Standridge Racing	66	Billy Standridge		5
Ford	Triad Motorsports	78	Jay Hedgecock	Tex Powell	6
Ford	Triad Motorsports	78	Pancho Carter	Tex Powell	3
Ford	Triad Motorsports	78	Hut Stricklin	Tex Powell	1
Ford	TriStar Motorsports	19	Phil Parsons		4
Ford	TriStar Motorsports	19	Loy Allen Jr.		11
Ford	Ultra Motorsports	08	Mike Bliss		1
Pontiac	Hagan Racing	14	Randy MacDonald		2
Pontiac	Hylton Motorsports	48	James Hylton		2
Pontiac	Virtue Racing	99	Danny Sullivan		1

== Schedule ==
No.	Race title	Track	Date	Network
	Busch Clash	Daytona International Speedway, Daytona Beach	February 12	CBS
	Gatorade Twin 125s	Daytona International Speedway, Daytona Beach	February 16	CBS
1	Daytona 500	Daytona International Speedway, Daytona Beach	February 19	CBS
2	Goodwrench 500	North Carolina Motor Speedway, Rockingham	February 26	TNN
3	Pontiac Excitement 400	Richmond International Raceway, Richmond	March 5	TBS
4	Purolator 500	Atlanta Motor Speedway, Hampton	March 12	ABC
5	TranSouth Financial 400	Darlington Raceway, Darlington	March 26	ESPN
6	Food City 500	Bristol International Raceway, Bristol	April 2	ESPN
7	First Union 400	North Wilkesboro Speedway, North Wilkesboro	April 9	ESPN
8	Hanes 500	Martinsville Speedway, Ridgeway	April 23	ESPN
9	Winston Select 500	Talladega Superspeedway, Talladega	April 30	ESPN
10	Save Mart Supermarkets 300	Sears Point Raceway, Sonoma	May 7	ESPN
	Winston Open	Charlotte Motor Speedway, Concord	May 20	TNN
	The Winston Select	Charlotte Motor Speedway, Concord	May 20	TNN
11	Coca-Cola 600	Charlotte Motor Speedway, Concord	May 28	TBS
12	Miller Genuine Draft 500	Dover Downs International Speedway, Dover	June 4	TNN
13	UAW-GM Teamwork 500	Pocono International Raceway, Long Pond	June 11	TNN
14	Miller Genuine Draft 400	Michigan International Speedway, Brooklyn	June 18	CBS
15	Pepsi 400	Daytona International Speedway, Daytona Beach	July 1	ESPN
16	Slick 50 300	New Hampshire International Speedway, Loudon	July 9	TNN
17	Miller Genuine Draft 500	Pocono International Raceway, Long Pond	July 16	TBS
18	DieHard 500	Talladega Superspeedway, Talladega	July 23	CBS
19	Brickyard 400	Indianapolis Motor Speedway, Speedway	August 5	ESPN
20	The Bud at The Glen	Watkins Glen International, Watkins Glen	August 13	ESPN
21	GM Goodwrench 400	Michigan International Speedway, Brooklyn	August 20	ESPN
22	Goody's 500	Bristol International Raceway, Bristol	August 26	ESPN
23	Mountain Dew Southern 500	Darlington Raceway, Darlington	September 3	ESPN
24	Miller Genuine Draft 400	Richmond International Raceway, Richmond	September 9	TBS
25	MBNA 500	Dover Downs International Speedway, Dover	September 17	TNN
26	Goody's 500	Martinsville Speedway, Ridgeway	September 24	ESPN
27	Tyson Holly Farms 400	North Wilkesboro Speedway, North Wilkesboro	October 1	ESPN
28	UAW-GM Quality 500	Charlotte Motor Speedway, Concord	October 8	TBS
29	AC Delco 400	North Carolina Motor Speedway, Rockingham	October 22	TNN
30	Dura Lube 500	Phoenix International Raceway, Phoenix	October 29	TNN
31	NAPA 500	Atlanta Motor Speedway, Hampton	November 12	ESPN

== Races ==
No.	Race	Pole position	Most laps led	Winning driver	Manufacturer
	Busch Clash	Geoff Bodine	Dale Earnhardt	Dale Earnhardt	Chevrolet
	Gatorade Twin 125 #1	Dale Jarrett	Sterling Marlin	Sterling Marlin	Chevrolet
	Gatorade Twin 125 #2	Dale Earnhardt	Dale Earnhardt	Dale Earnhardt	Chevrolet
1	Daytona 500	Dale Jarrett	Sterling Marlin	Sterling Marlin	Chevrolet
2	Goodwrench 500	Jeff Gordon	Jeff Gordon	Jeff Gordon	Chevrolet
3	Pontiac Excitement 400	Jeff Gordon	Rusty Wallace	Terry Labonte	Chevrolet
4	Purolator 500	Dale Earnhardt	Jeff Gordon	Jeff Gordon	Chevrolet
5	TranSouth Financial 400	Jeff Gordon	Jeff Gordon	Sterling Marlin	Chevrolet
6	Food City 500	Mark Martin	Jeff Gordon	Jeff Gordon	Chevrolet
7	First Union 400	Jeff Gordon	Dale Earnhardt	Dale Earnhardt	Chevrolet
8	Hanes 500	Bobby Labonte	Rusty Wallace	Rusty Wallace	Ford
9	Winston Select 500	Terry Labonte	Mark Martin	Mark Martin	Ford
10	Save Mart Supermarkets 300	Ricky Rudd	Mark Martin	Dale Earnhardt	Chevrolet
	Winston Open	Michael Waltrip	Todd Bodine	Todd Bodine	Ford
	The Winston Select	Bobby Labonte	Jeff Gordon	Jeff Gordon	Chevrolet
11	Coca-Cola 600	Jeff Gordon	Ken Schrader	Bobby Labonte	Chevrolet
12	Miller Genuine Draft 500	Jeff Gordon	Kyle Petty	Kyle Petty	Pontiac
13	UAW-GM Teamwork 500	Ken Schrader	Jeff Gordon	Terry Labonte	Chevrolet
14	Miller Genuine Draft 400	Jeff Gordon	Jeff Gordon	Bobby Labonte	Chevrolet
15	Pepsi 400	Dale Earnhardt	Jeff Gordon; Sterling Marlin	Jeff Gordon	Chevrolet
16	Slick 50 300	Mark Martin	Jeff Gordon	Jeff Gordon	Chevrolet
17	Miller Genuine Draft 500	Bill Elliott	Rusty Wallace	Dale Jarrett	Ford
18	DieHard 500	Sterling Marlin	Jeff Gordon	Sterling Marlin	Chevrolet
19	Brickyard 400	Jeff Gordon	Bill Elliott	Dale Earnhardt	Chevrolet
20	The Bud at The Glen	Mark Martin	Mark Martin	Mark Martin	Ford
21	GM Goodwrench Dealer 400	Bobby Labonte	Jeff Gordon	Bobby Labonte	Chevrolet
22	Goody's 500	Mark Martin	Dale Jarrett	Terry Labonte	Chevrolet
23	Mountain Dew Southern 500	John Andretti	Dale Earnhardt	Jeff Gordon	Chevrolet
24	Miller Genuine Draft 400	Dale Earnhardt	Rusty Wallace	Rusty Wallace	Ford
25	MBNA 500	Rick Mast	Jeff Gordon	Jeff Gordon	Chevrolet
26	Goody's 500	Jeff Gordon	Dale Earnhardt	Dale Earnhardt	Chevrolet
27	Tyson Holly Farms 400	Ted Musgrave	Mark Martin	Mark Martin	Ford
28	UAW-GM Quality 500	Ricky Rudd	Ricky Rudd	Mark Martin	Ford
29	AC Delco 400	Hut Stricklin	Rick Mast	Ward Burton	Pontiac
30	Dura Lube 500	Bill Elliott	Ernie Irvan	Ricky Rudd	Ford
31	NAPA 500	Darrell Waltrip	Dale Earnhardt	Dale Earnhardt	Chevrolet

=== Busch Clash ===
The 1995 Busch Clash, kicked off the season on February 12, at Daytona International Speedway. Geoff Bodine drew the pole. Dale Earnhardt would dominate, leading 18 of 20 laps to collect his 6th Clash win.

Top ten results

1. #3 - Dale Earnhardt
2. #4 - Sterling Marlin
3. #94 - Bill Elliott
4. #24 - Jeff Gordon
5. #75 - Todd Bodine
6. #10 - Ricky Rudd
7. #16 - Ted Musgrave
8. #2 - Rusty Wallace
9. #23 - Jimmy Spencer
10. #1 - Rick Mast
- As an exhibition race, no points are awarded. The race was between 1994 Winston Cup pole winners. In addition, the driver who collected the most poles in the 1994 Busch Season would also win an invitation to compete. David Green would win the Busch Series invitation, driving the #95 Busch Beer Chevrolet owned by Ken Schrader.

=== Gatorade 125s ===
The Gatorade 125s, the qualifying races for the Daytona 500, were held on Thursday, February 16, at Daytona International Speedway. The lineups for the 125s were determined by qualifying the previous Sunday. The first race would consist of drivers who qualified in odd-numbered positions (1st, 3rd, 5th, etc.), while the second race would be formed from even-numbered qualifiers. As the fastest driver, Dale Jarrett would start from the pole in the first race, and second-fastest driver Dale Earnhardt would lead the field in the second race.

Top ten results (Race 1)

1. #4 - Sterling Marlin
2. #17 - Darrell Waltrip
3. #28 - Dale Jarrett
4. #2 - Rusty Wallace
5. #25 - Ken Schrader
6. #5 - Terry Labonte
7. #42 - Kyle Petty
8. #30 - Michael Waltrip
9. #15 - Dick Trickle
10. #71 - Dave Marcis

Top ten results (Race 2)

1. #3 - Dale Earnhardt
2. #24 - Jeff Gordon
3. #6 - Mark Martin
4. #75 - Todd Bodine
5. #94 - Bill Elliott
6. #16 - Ted Musgrave
7. #41 - Ricky Craven
8. #9 - Lake Speed
9. #10 - Ricky Rudd
10. #18 - Bobby Labonte

=== Daytona 500 ===
The 1995 Daytona 500 was held February 19 at Daytona International Speedway. Dale Jarrett won his first career Winston Cup pole.

Top ten results

1. #4 - Sterling Marlin*
2. #3 - Dale Earnhardt
3. #6 - Mark Martin
4. #16 - Ted Musgrave
5. #28 - Dale Jarrett
6. #30 - Michael Waltrip
7. #29 - Steve Grissom
8. #5 - Terry Labonte
9. #25 - Ken Schrader
10. #21 - Morgan Shepherd

Failed to qualify: #20 - Bobby Hillin Jr., #40 - Greg Sacks, #14 - Randy MacDonald, #95 - Doug Heveron, #82 - Terry Byers, #52 - Gary Bradberry, #62 - Ronnie Sanders, #81 - Kenny Wallace, #73 - Phil Barkdoll, #99 - Shawna Robinson, #72 - Jim Sauter, #51 - Kerry Teague, #97 - Chad Little, #68 - Bob Strait, #23 - Jimmy Spencer, #0 - Delma Cowart, #47 - Billy Standridge, #67 - Ken Bouchard, #48 - James Hylton, #53 - Ritchie Petty, #32 - Mike Chase, #65 - Steve Seligman

- As of 2026, Sterling Marlin is the only driver in NASCAR history to score his first two career Cup Series victories in the Daytona 500.
- Marlin became the third driver to win back-to-back Daytona 500s, joining Richard Petty and Cale Yarborough, and the last driver to accomplish it until Denny Hamlin in 2020.

=== Goodwrench 500 ===
The Goodwrench 500 was held February 26 at North Carolina Speedway. Jeff Gordon won the pole.

Top ten results

1. #24 - Jeff Gordon
2. #18 - Bobby Labonte
3. #3 - Dale Earnhardt
4. #10 - Ricky Rudd
5. #28 - Dale Jarrett, -1 lap
6. #29 - Steve Grissom, -1 lap
7. #6 - Mark Martin, -2 laps
8. #12 - Derrike Cope, -3 laps
9. #31 - Ward Burton, -3 laps
10. #42 - Kyle Petty, -3 laps

Failed to qualify (in order of speeds): #66 - Ben Hess, #52 - Gary Bradberry, #48 - James Hylton, #47 - Billy Standridge, #19 - Phil Parsons

- This was the last 500-mile race at Rockingham.
- Ernie Irvan returned to a NASCAR event for the first time since his near-fatal accident at Michigan in August 1994, serving as a color analyst for TNN's live flag to flag coverage.

=== Pontiac Excitement 400 ===
The Pontiac Excitement 400 was held March 5 at Richmond International Raceway. Jeff Gordon won the pole.

Top ten results

1. #5 - Terry Labonte
2. #3 - Dale Earnhardt
3. #2 - Rusty Wallace
4. #25 - Ken Schrader
5. #4 - Sterling Marlin
6. #12 - Derrike Cope
7. #17 - Darrell Waltrip
8. #6 - Mark Martin, -1 lap
9. #43 - Bobby Hamilton, -1 lap
10. #37 - John Andretti, -1 lap

Failed to qualify: #32 - Jimmy Hensley, #81 - Kenny Wallace, #47 - Billy Standridge, #78 - Jay Hedgecock, #29 - Steve Grissom*, #52 - Gary Bradberry, #66 - Ben Hess, #49 - Eric Smith, #77 - Davy Jones

- Steve Grissom entered this race 5th in points after back-to-back top 10s, but failed to qualify based on points from 1994.

=== Purolator 500 ===
The Purolator 500 was held March 12 at Atlanta Motor Speedway. Dale Earnhardt won the pole.

Top ten results

1. #24 - Jeff Gordon
2. #18 - Bobby Labonte
3. #5 - Terry Labonte
4. #3 - Dale Earnhardt
5. #28 - Dale Jarrett, -1 lap
6. #21 - Morgan Shepherd, -1 lap
7. #4 - Sterling Marlin, -1 lap
8. #10 - Ricky Rudd, -1 lap
9. #6 - Mark Martin, -2 laps
10. #2 - Rusty Wallace, -2 laps

Failed to qualify: #31 - Ward Burton, #52 - Gary Bradberry, #27 - Loy Allen Jr., #67 - Ken Bouchard, #76 - Johnny Chapman, #66 - Ben Hess, #81 - Kenny Wallace, #78 - Pancho Carter

- Before the field took the green flag, Mike Wallace got turned into the inside wall on the frontstretch, damaging his car before the race began. Wallace completed only 33 laps, finishing 40th due to engine failure from the crash.

=== TranSouth Financial 400 ===
The TranSouth Financial 400 was held March 26 at Darlington Raceway. Jeff Gordon won the pole.

Top ten results

1. #4 - Sterling Marlin
2. #3 - Dale Earnhardt
3. #16 - Ted Musgrave
4. #75 - Todd Bodine
5. #12 - Derrike Cope
6. #29 - Steve Grissom
7. #30 - Michael Waltrip
8. #21 - Morgan Shepherd
9. #43 - Bobby Hamilton
10. #37 - John Andretti, -1 lap

Failed to qualify: #81 - Kenny Wallace, #52 - Brad Teague, #19 - Phil Parsons

- Jeff Gordon, who led most laps, crashed out on lap 201 and finished 32nd.
- This was Sterling Marlin's first victory on a non-restrictor plate track.

=== Food City 500 ===
The Food City 500 was held April 2 at Bristol International Raceway. Mark Martin won the pole.

Top ten results

1. #24 - Jeff Gordon
2. #2 - Rusty Wallace
3. #17 - Darrell Waltrip*
4. #43 - Bobby Hamilton
5. #10 - Ricky Rudd
6. #28 - Dale Jarrett
7. #5 - Terry Labonte, -1 lap
8. #6 - Mark Martin, -1 lap
9. #4 - Sterling Marlin, -1 lap
10. #33 - Robert Pressley, -2 laps

Failed to qualify: #98 - Jeremy Mayfield, #87 - Joe Nemechek, #26 - Steve Kinser, #47 - Billy Standridge, #78 - Hut Stricklin, #66 - Butch Miller, #52 - Brad Teague, #27 - Loy Allen Jr., #90 - Mike Wallace

- This was the last ever Top 3 finish for Darrell Waltrip.

=== First Union 400 ===
The First Union 400 was held April 9 at North Wilkesboro Speedway. Jeff Gordon won the pole.

Top ten results

1. #3 - Dale Earnhardt
2. #24 - Jeff Gordon
3. #6 - Mark Martin
4. #2 - Rusty Wallace*
5. #29 - Steve Grissom*
6. #16 - Ted Musgrave, -1 lap
7. #4 - Sterling Marlin, -1 lap
8. #1 - Rick Mast, -1 lap
9. #11 - Brett Bodine, -1 lap
10. #17 - Darrell Waltrip, -2 laps

Failed to qualify: #98 - Jeremy Mayfield, #81 - Kenny Wallace, #32 - Chuck Bown, #78 - Jay Hedgecock, #77 - Davy Jones, #47 - Billy Standridge, #27 - Jeff Purvis, #26 - Steve Kinser, #52 - Randy MacDonald

- Steve Grissom re-entered the top 10 in points after his DNQ at Richmond.
- Sprint car legend Steve Kinser made his final career NASCAR start in this race, as he would be fired from King Racing after five finishes of 27th or worse.
- This was Rusty Wallace's 23nd consecutive Top-10 finish on a short track, breaking the Modern Era record held by Cale Yarborough.

=== Hanes 500 ===
The Hanes 500 was held April 23 at Martinsville Speedway. Bobby Labonte won the pole.

Top ten results

1. #2 - Rusty Wallace*
2. #16 - Ted Musgrave
3. #24 - Jeff Gordon
4. #17 - Darrell Waltrip
5. #6 - Mark Martin
6. #25 - Ken Schrader
7. #28 - Dale Jarrett
8. #43 - Bobby Hamilton
9. #42 - Kyle Petty, -1 lap
10. #18 - Bobby Labonte, -1 lap

Failed to qualify: #75 - Todd Bodine, #23 - Jimmy Spencer, #32 - Chuck Bown, #78 - Jay Hedgecock, #8 - Jeff Burton, #22 - Randy LaJoie, #77 - Davy Jones

- This race was shortened to 356 laps due to a combination of a long red flag for rain, and darkness.
- Along with the victory, this would be the 24th and final consecutive short track top-10 finish for Rusty Wallace, a Modern Era record that still stands today.

=== Winston Select 500 ===
The Winston Select 500 was held April 30 at Talladega Superspeedway. Terry Labonte won the pole.

Top ten results

1. #6 - Mark Martin
2. #24 - Jeff Gordon
3. #21 - Morgan Shepherd
4. #17 - Darrell Waltrip
5. #18 - Bobby Labonte
6. #94 - Bill Elliott
7. #7 - Geoff Bodine
8. #75 - Todd Bodine
9. #23 - Jimmy Spencer
10. #19 - Loy Allen Jr.*

Failed to qualify: #53 - Ritchie Petty, #47 - Billy Standridge, #87 - Joe Nemechek, #65 - Steve Seligman, #0 - Delma Cowart

- This was Loy Allen Jr.'s only top 10 finish in NASCAR Winston Cup Series racing.
- Dale Earnhardt was leading the race with two laps to go, but was passed by Mark Martin in the tri-oval coming to the white flag and spun around by Morgan Shepherd exiting turn 2 on the last lap. The car lifted over a foot but roof flaps prevented the car getting airborne. Earnhardt managed to save the car and drove it to a 21st-place finish.

=== Save Mart Supermarkets 300 ===
The Save Mart Supermarkets 300 was held May 7 at Sears Point Raceway. Ricky Rudd won the pole.

Top ten results

1. #3 - Dale Earnhardt*
2. #6 - Mark Martin
3. #24 - Jeff Gordon
4. #10 - Ricky Rudd
5. #5 - Terry Labonte
6. #16 - Ted Musgrave
7. #4 - Sterling Marlin
8. #75 - Todd Bodine
9. #25 - Ken Schrader
10. #30 - Michael Waltrip

Failed to qualify: #40 - Greg Sacks, #98 - Jeremy Mayfield, #27 - Elton Sawyer, #00w - Scott Gaylord, #64 - Garrett Evans, #22w - St. James Davis, #19 - Ernie Cope

- This was Dale Earnhardt's only career road course victory in Winston Cup competition. Coming to the white flag, Mark Martin hit oil and Earnhardt drove by him, took the lead and held off Martin for the victory.
- Dale Jarrett's car got up on its side in a crash on lap 62 trying to avoid a wreck between Rusty Wallace and Davy Jones. The marshals pushed him back on all four wheels, and he finished the race on the lead lap in 23rd.

=== Winston Select ===
The Winston Select was a non-points exhibition race held May 20th at Charlotte Motor Speedway. Michael Waltrip won the pole for the Winston Select Open, while Bobby Labonte won the pole for the main race.

Top ten results (Open)

1. #75 - Todd Bodine
2. #25 - Ken Schrader
3. #33 - Robert Pressley
4. #90 - Mike Wallace
5. #9 - Lake Speed
6. #41 - Ricky Craven
7. #8 - Jeff Burton
8. #43 - Bobby Hamilton
9. #15 - Dick Trickle
10. #30 - Michael Waltrip
- The top-5 finishers of the Open transferred to the main Winston Select race.

Top ten results

1. #24 - Jeff Gordon
2. #4 - Sterling Marlin
3. #10 - Ricky Rudd
4. #2 - Rusty Wallace
5. #7 - Geoff Bodine
6. #94 - Bill Elliott
7. #90 - Mike Wallace
8. #23 - Jimmy Spencer
9. #11 - Brett Bodine
- Darrell Waltrip suffered three broken ribs in a crash on lap 60 after contact with Dale Earnhardt. Waltrip would need help from relief drivers for the next several races.
- Instead of his standard black paint scheme, Dale Earnhardt ran a unique silver #3 Chevy in this race to commemorate the 25th anniversary of Winston's title sponsorship of the Cup Series. It is considered to be one of the first "special" paint schemes in NASCAR, and is believed to have started the tradition of NASCAR teams running unique schemes in special events.

=== Coca-Cola 600 ===
The Coca-Cola 600 was held May 28 at Charlotte Motor Speedway. Jeff Gordon won the pole.

Top ten results

1. #18 - Bobby Labonte*
2. #5 - Terry Labonte
3. #30 - Michael Waltrip
4. #4 - Sterling Marlin, -1 lap
5. #10 - Ricky Rudd, -1 lap
6. #3 - Dale Earnhardt, -1 lap
7. #26 - Hut Stricklin, -1 lap
8. #9 - Lake Speed, -2 laps
9. #43 - Bobby Hamilton, -2 laps
10. #41 - Ricky Craven, -3 laps

Failed to qualify: #40 - Greg Sacks, #20 - Bobby Hillin Jr., #95 - Jimmy Hensley, #77 - Davy Jones, #44 - Jeff Purvis, #67 - Johnny Chapman

- This was Bobby Labonte's first NASCAR Winston Cup victory.
- Jimmy Hensley relieved Darrell Waltrip during this race because of the injuries that Waltrip suffered the previous Saturday night during The Winston.

=== Miller Genuine Draft 500 ===
The Miller Genuine Draft 500 was held June 4 at Dover Downs International Speedway. Jeff Gordon won the pole.

Top ten results

1. #42 - Kyle Petty*
2. #18 - Bobby Labonte
3. #16 - Ted Musgrave
4. #26 - Hut Stricklin
5. #3 - Dale Earnhardt
6. #24 - Jeff Gordon, -1 lap
7. #4 - Sterling Marlin, -1 lap
8. #30 - Michael Waltrip, -1 lap
9. #2 - Rusty Wallace, -1 lap
10. #87 - Joe Nemechek, -1 lap

Failed to qualify: #79 - Doug French, #19 - Loy Allen Jr.

- This would be Kyle Petty's eighth and final career Cup Series victory. It would also be the last victory for Team SABCO until September 1999.
- This was the first race at Dover after the track's surface had been changed from asphalt to concrete.

=== UAW-GM Teamwork 500 ===
The UAW-GM Teamwork 500 was held June 11 at Pocono Raceway. Ken Schrader won the pole.

Top ten results

1. #5 - Terry Labonte
2. #16 - Ted Musgrave
3. #25 - Ken Schrader
4. #4 - Sterling Marlin
5. #26 - Hut Stricklin
6. #94 - Bill Elliott
7. #21 - Morgan Shepherd
8. #3 - Dale Earnhardt
9. #30 - Michael Waltrip
10. #11 - Brett Bodine

Failed to qualify: #79 - Doug French

- Jimmy Horton, driving the #27 Ford in place of Elton Sawyer, climbed out of the car in the first half after being overcome by fumes. Jimmy Spencer, who had parked his #23 Ford earlier because of engine problems, took over in relief. Spencer took the #27 to a 34th-place finish, 8 laps down.

=== Miller Genuine Draft 400 ===
The Miller Genuine Draft 400 was held June 18 at Michigan International Speedway. Jeff Gordon won the pole.

Top ten results

1. #18 - Bobby Labonte
2. #24 - Jeff Gordon
3. #2 - Rusty Wallace
4. #37 - John Andretti
5. #21 - Morgan Shepherd
6. #28 - Dale Jarrett
7. #4 - Sterling Marlin
8. #6 - Mark Martin
9. #5 - Terry Labonte
10. #16 - Ted Musgrave

Failed to qualify: #88 - Gary Bradberry, #40 - Greg Sacks

- Late in the race, Lake Speed pinched Michael Waltrip into the wall, leading to a confrontation on pit road after the race. Waltrip ended up throwing a couple of punches through the driver's side window of Speed's Ford. Waltrip would be fined $10,000 by NASCAR for the incident.

=== Pepsi 400 ===
The Pepsi 400 was held July 1 at Daytona International Speedway. Dale Earnhardt won the pole.

Top ten results

1. #24 - Jeff Gordon
2. #4 - Sterling Marlin
3. #3 - Dale Earnhardt
4. #6 - Mark Martin
5. #16 - Ted Musgrave
6. #25 - Ken Schrader
7. #42 - Kyle Petty
8. #10 - Ricky Rudd
9. #23 - Jimmy Spencer
10. #94 - Bill Elliott

Failed to qualify: #81 - Kenny Wallace, #0 - Delma Cowart, #65 - Steve Seligman

- The race ended on an unusual 1 lap shootout.

=== Slick 50 300 ===
The Slick 50 300 was held July 9 at New Hampshire International Speedway. Mark Martin won the pole.

Top ten results

1. #24 - Jeff Gordon*
2. #21 - Morgan Shepherd
3. #6 - Mark Martin
4. #5 - Terry Labonte
5. #10 - Ricky Rudd
6. #2 - Rusty Wallace
7. #12 - Derrike Cope
8. #16 - Ted Musgrave
9. #4 - Sterling Marlin
10. #25 - Ken Schrader

Failed to qualify: #49 - Eric Smith

- Jeff Gordon took the championship lead from Sterling Marlin after this race, and would hold it for the rest of the season.

=== Miller Genuine Draft 500 ===
The Miller Genuine Draft 500 was held July 16 at Pocono Raceway. Bill Elliott won the pole.

Top ten results

1. #28 - Dale Jarrett*
2. #24 - Jeff Gordon
3. #10 - Ricky Rudd
4. #16 - Ted Musgrave
5. #94 - Bill Elliott
6. #7 - Geoff Bodine
7. #6 - Mark Martin
8. #98 - Jeremy Mayfield
9. #87 - Joe Nemechek
10. #15 - Dick Trickle

Failed to qualify: #14 - Randy MacDonald, #82 - Terry Byers

- This was Dale Jarrett's first victory with Robert Yates Racing.

=== DieHard 500 ===
The DieHard 500 was held July 23 at Talladega Superspeedway. Sterling Marlin won the pole.

Top ten results

1. #4 - Sterling Marlin
2. #28 - Dale Jarrett
3. #3 - Dale Earnhardt
4. #21 - Morgan Shepherd
5. #94 - Bill Elliott
6. #42 - Kyle Petty
7. #6 - Mark Martin
8. #24 - Jeff Gordon
9. #30 - Michael Waltrip
10. #23 - Jimmy Spencer, -1 lap

Failed to qualify: #22 - Jimmy Hensley, #0 - Delma Cowart, #65 - Steve Seligman

- Air temperatures during this event reached as high as 103 °F, making it one of the hottest races in Cup Series history.
- There were only two caution flags during the race. The first was for debris on the track on lap 111, the second for "The Big One", a 13-car accident on lap 139 that featured Ken Schrader's car flipping end-over-end in the infield grass on the backstretch after contact from Jeff Gordon. Schrader was not injured.
- Gordon was very distraught, even in tears, over Schrader's crash because of the contact that started it. The team brought Schrader over and had him get on Gordon's radio after leaving the infield care center to tell him that he was okay.

=== Brickyard 400 ===
The second Brickyard 400 was held August 5 at Indianapolis Motor Speedway. Jeff Gordon won the pole.

Top ten results

1. #3 - Dale Earnhardt
2. #2 - Rusty Wallace
3. #28 - Dale Jarrett
4. #94 - Bill Elliott
5. #6 - Mark Martin
6. #24 - Jeff Gordon
7. #4 - Sterling Marlin
8. #1 - Rick Mast
9. #18 - Bobby Labonte
10. #21 - Morgan Shepherd

Failed to qualify: #44 - Jeff Purvis, #95 - Loy Allen Jr., #66 - Billy Standridge, #78 - Pancho Carter, #71 - Dave Marcis, #65 - Steve Seligman, #50 - A. J. Foyt, #80 - Joe Ruttman, #99 - Danny Sullivan* - Withdrew

- Danny Sullivan's entry was withdrawn after his career-ending crash in the Marlboro 500 at Michigan.

=== The Bud at The Glen ===
The Bud at The Glen was held August 13 at Watkins Glen International. Mark Martin won the pole.

Top ten results

1. #6 - Mark Martin*
2. #22 - Wally Dallenbach Jr.*
3. #24 - Jeff Gordon
4. #10 - Ricky Rudd
5. #5 - Terry Labonte
6. #18 - Bobby Labonte
7. #37 - John Andretti
8. #17 - Darrell Waltrip
9. #7 - Geoff Bodine
10. #41 - Ricky Craven

Failed to qualify: #61 - David Murry, #90 - Mike Wallace, #49 - Eric Smith

- During pre-race ceremonies, all drivers participated in unity for a parade lap to show support for series sponsor R. J. Reynolds. Each driver rode in the back of a pickup truck holding an American flag visible to all spectators. This was done in protest to President Bill Clinton's executive order earlier in the week targeting tobacco advertising at sporting events.
- This was Mark Martin's third consecutive victory from the pole at Watkins Glen.
- Wally Dallenbach Jr. finished 2nd in a one-race deal with Bill Davis Racing. Dallenbach was leading by almost 10 seconds late in the race, but was chased down and passed by Mark Martin.
- Canadian road racing specialist Ron Fellows made his first Cup start in this race, driving the #68 for Canaska Motorsports.
- During a rain delay; Mark Martin and Dale Earnhardt were granted the opportunity to run NASCAR's first test of rain tires, running a total of 16 laps during the test period. NASCAR would not use rain tires for a race until the 2020 Bank of America Roval 400.

=== GM Goodwrench 400 ===
The GM Goodwrench 400 was held August 20 at Michigan International Speedway. Bobby Labonte won the pole.

Top ten results

1. #18 - Bobby Labonte
2. #5 - Terry Labonte
3. #24 - Jeff Gordon
4. #4 - Sterling Marlin
5. #2 - Rusty Wallace
6. #31 - Ward Burton*
7. #41 - Ricky Craven
8. #43 - Bobby Hamilton
9. #94 - Bill Elliott, -1 lap
10. #26 - Hut Stricklin, -1 lap

Failed to qualify: #40 - Rich Bickle, #72 - Tracy Leslie, #02 - Tim Steele, #95 - Loy Allen Jr.

- This was Ward Burton's last race in the #31 Chevrolet for A. G. Dillard Motorsports. Starting at Bristol next week, Burton would drive the #22 Pontiac for Bill Davis Racing.

=== Goody's 500 ===
The Goody's 500 was held August 26 at Bristol International Raceway. Mark Martin won the pole.

Top ten results

1. #5 - Terry Labonte*
2. #3 - Dale Earnhardt*
3. #28 - Dale Jarrett
4. #17 - Darrell Waltrip
5. #6 - Mark Martin
6. #24 - Jeff Gordon
7. #4 - Sterling Marlin
8. #90 - Mike Wallace
9. #8 - Jeff Burton
10. #12 - Derrike Cope, -1 lap

Failed to qualify: #42 - Kyle Petty, #95 - Joe Ruttman, #81 - Kenny Wallace, #32 - Jimmy Hensley, #77 - Bobby Hillin Jr., #75 - Todd Bodine, #27 - Elton Sawyer

- This race started roughly an hour and a half to two hours behind schedule due to persistent rains from Tropical Storm Jerry, which had made landfall to the south earlier in the week.
- This race is known for its chaotic finish between Dale Earnhardt and Terry Labonte. After Earnhardt managed to run down Labonte in the closing laps, both cars made contact in turn 4 on the last lap. Labonte crashed into the outside wall, but slid across the finish line first to claim the victory.
- Rusty Wallace finished 21st in this race due to crashing on lap 32 after contact from Dale Earnhardt, ending Wallace's streak of 24 consecutive top-10s on short tracks. Earnhardt was sent to the rear of the field after the incident. This resulted in a fight breaking out between Wallace and Earnhardt after the race where Wallace threw a water bottle at Earnhardt.
- Bobby Hamilton was given a 5 lap penalty for rough driving for wrecking Brett Bodine twice within 20 laps.

=== Mountain Dew Southern 500 ===
The Mountain Dew Southern 500 was held September 3 at Darlington Raceway. John Andretti won the pole.

Top ten results

1. #24 - Jeff Gordon
2. #3 - Dale Earnhardt
3. #2 - Rusty Wallace
4. #22 - Ward Burton
5. #30 - Michael Waltrip
6. #10 - Ricky Rudd
7. #26 - Hut Stricklin
8. #18 - Bobby Labonte
9. #9 - Lake Speed
10. #4 - Sterling Marlin

Failed to qualify: #66 - Billy Standridge, #52 - Brad Teague, #88 - Gary Bradberry

=== Miller Genuine Draft 400 ===
The Miller Genuine Draft 400 was held September 9 at Richmond International Raceway. Dale Earnhardt won the pole.

Top ten results

1. #2 - Rusty Wallace
2. #5 - Terry Labonte
3. #3 - Dale Earnhardt
4. #28 - Dale Jarrett
5. #43 - Bobby Hamilton
6. #24 - Jeff Gordon
7. #37 - John Andretti, -1 lap
8. #10 - Ricky Rudd, -1 lap
9. #25 - Ken Schrader, -1 lap
10. #16 - Ted Musgrave, -1 lap

Failed to qualify: #32 - Ed Berrier, #78 - Jay Hedgecock, #40 - Shane Hall, #29 - Steve Grissom, #90 - Mike Wallace, #49 - Eric Smith

=== MBNA 500 ===
The MBNA 500 was held September 17 at Dover Downs International Speedway. Rick Mast won the pole.

Top ten results

1. #24 - Jeff Gordon
2. #43 - Bobby Hamilton
3. #2 - Rusty Wallace
4. #87 - Joe Nemechek
5. #3 - Dale Earnhardt
6. #4 - Sterling Marlin
7. #12 - Derrike Cope, -1 lap
8. #6 - Mark Martin, -1 lap
9. #18 - Bobby Labonte, -2 laps
10. #10 - Ricky Rudd, -2 laps

Failed to qualify: #66 - Billy Standridge, #67 - Terry Fisher, #31 - Greg Sacks

=== Goody's 500 ===
The Goody's 500 was held September 24 at Martinsville Speedway. Due to qualifying getting rained-out, the starting lineup was decided by points positions. Championship leader Jeff Gordon started on the pole.

Top ten results

1. #3 - Dale Earnhardt
2. #5 - Terry Labonte
3. #2 - Rusty Wallace
4. #43 - Bobby Hamilton
5. #7 - Geoff Bodine
6. #94 - Bill Elliott
7. #24 - Jeff Gordon
8. #17 - Darrell Waltrip
9. #12 - Derrike Cope
10. #28 - Dale Jarrett

Failed to qualify: #31 - Jimmy Hensley, #32 - Greg Sacks, #40 - Rich Bickle, #71 - Dave Marcis, #77 - Bobby Hillin Jr., #81 - Kenny Wallace

=== Tyson Holly Farms 400 ===
The Tyson Holly Farms 400 was held October 1 at North Wilkesboro Speedway. Ted Musgrave won the pole.

Top ten results

1. #6 - Mark Martin
2. #2 - Rusty Wallace
3. #24 - Jeff Gordon
4. #5 - Terry Labonte
5. #10 - Ricky Rudd
6. #88 - Ernie Irvan*
7. #28 - Dale Jarrett
8. #25 - Ken Schrader, -1 lap
9. #3 - Dale Earnhardt, -1 lap
10. #94 - Bill Elliott, -1 lap

Failed to qualify: #75 - Todd Bodine, #32 - Greg Sacks, #98 - Jeremy Mayfield, #22 - Ward Burton, #8 - Jeff Burton, #90 - Mike Wallace, #78 - Jay Hedgecock

- Ernie Irvan made his long-awaited return to Cup Series racing in this event, driving a second Robert Yates Racing entry. This would be the first of four Cup races Irvan would enter in 1995 to re-acclimate himself to racing before returning to full-time competition in 1996.
- All 36 cars starting the race finished the event within ten laps of the winner. It was the first race since 1959 that an entire starting field finished the race, with no drivers scoring a DNF.

=== UAW-GM Quality 500 ===
The UAW-GM Quality 500 was held October 8 at Charlotte Motor Speedway. Ricky Rudd won the pole.

Top ten results

1. #6 - Mark Martin
2. #3 - Dale Earnhardt*
3. #5 - Terry Labonte
4. #10 - Ricky Rudd
5. #28 - Dale Jarrett
6. #4 - Sterling Marlin
7. #22 - Ward Burton
8. #18 - Bobby Labonte
9. #2 - Rusty Wallace
10. #43 - Bobby Hamilton

Failed to qualify: #97 - Chad Little, #81 - Kenny Wallace, #44 - Jeff Purvis, #0 - Delma Cowart, #66 - Billy Standridge

- Dale Earnhardt took the Past Champion's Provisional to get into this race. Within 70 laps, he was 2nd.

=== AC Delco 400 ===
The AC Delco 400 was held October 22 at North Carolina Speedway. Hut Stricklin won the pole.

Top ten results

1. #22 - Ward Burton*
2. #2 - Rusty Wallace
3. #6 - Mark Martin
4. #5 - Terry Labonte
5. #8 - Jeff Burton
6. #4 - Sterling Marlin
7. #3 - Dale Earnhardt
8. #41 - Ricky Craven
9. #87 - Joe Nemechek
10. #94 - Bill Elliott

Failed to qualify: #71 - Dave Marcis, #88 - Ernie Irvan, #19 - Loy Allen Jr., #78 - Jay Hedgecock, #84 - Norm Benning, #70 - Alan Russell, #14 - Richard Brickhouse

- This was the first Cup Series victory for Ward Burton, and for Bill Davis Racing. It would also be their last victory until March 2000.
- This race featured an unusual 10+ lap long caution due to an error by NASCAR officials pertaining to Dale Earnhardt's car. On a green flag pit stop, Earnhardt's crew changed 4 tires like any other stop. However, one of the lugnuts on the left front tire was not painted red like the rest, making it appear that it was missing. As a result, an official called Earnhardt's car back to the pits to fix the problem that didn't actually exist. NASCAR then threw the caution in order to essentially put Earnhardt back where he was before the officials' error occurred, which was more or less unprecedented.

=== Dura Lube 500 ===
The Dura Lube 500 was held October 29 at Phoenix International Raceway. Bill Elliott won the pole.

Top ten results

1. #10 - Ricky Rudd*
2. #12 - Derrike Cope
3. #3 - Dale Earnhardt
4. #2 - Rusty Wallace
5. #24 - Jeff Gordon*
6. #16 - Ted Musgrave
7. #21 - Morgan Shepherd
8. #6 - Mark Martin
9. #1 - Rick Mast
10. #25 - Ken Schrader

Failed to qualify: #50 - A. J. Foyt, #97 - Chad Little, #08 - Mike Bliss, #40 - Shane Hall, #00w - Scott Gaylord, #58w - Wayne Jacks, #7w - L. J. Pryor, #36w - Rich Woodland Jr.

- This victory extended Ricky Rudd's streak of consecutive race-winning seasons to 13, dating back to 1983.
- Championship leader Jeff Gordon left Phoenix with a 147-point lead over Dale Earnhardt.

=== NAPA 500 ===
The NAPA 500 was held November 12 at Atlanta Motor Speedway. The #17 of Darrell Waltrip won the pole, the final one of his career, and his first since 1992.

Top ten results

1. #3 - Dale Earnhardt*
2. #4 - Sterling Marlin
3. #2 - Rusty Wallace
4. #94 - Bill Elliott
5. #22 - Ward Burton
6. #23 - Jimmy Spencer
7. #88 - Ernie Irvan, -1 lap
8. #18 - Bobby Labonte, -1 lap
9. #77 - Bobby Hillin Jr., -1 lap
10. #10 - Ricky Rudd, -1 lap

Failed to qualify: #66 - Billy Standridge, #44 - Jeff Purvis*, #59 - Jack Sprague*, #90 - Mike Wallace, #40 - Shane Hall, #0 - Delma Cowart, #49 - Eric Smith

- Despite finishing 14 laps down in 32nd place, Jeff Gordon won the 1995 Winston Cup championship by 34 points over Dale Earnhardt. Gordon entered the race needing to finish 41st or better to win the championship. As a result, he took it easy during the race. At one point, the team did a pit stop with Ray Evernham, Gordon's crew chief, serving as a tire changer.
- Dale Earnhardt, who was 2nd in points, dominated the race, leading 268 of the 328 laps, while Gordon only led one lap during green flag pit stops. Earnhardt gained a total of 113 points on Gordon in this event, but Gordon still won by 34 points, denying Earnhardt of a record-tying 3rd consecutive Cup championship, and a record-breaking 8th Cup championship overall.
- For this race, Hendrick Motorsports entered two extra cars in the event, the #58 of Jimmy Horton, and the #59 of Jack Sprague, for insurance purposes. If problems were to befall Jeff Gordon's car, one car would immediately pull off the track and retire from the race. Horton qualified 34th while Sprague failed to qualify. The day before the Cup race, Horton suffered serious injuries after a violent crash in the ARCA Bondo Mar-Hyde Series support race. Jeff Purvis, who failed to qualify for Phoenix Racing, was then hired to sub for Horton in the #58 and drove the car to a 26th-place finish, 8 laps down.
- Final race for King Racing, owned by drag racing legend Kenny Bernstein.
- Last career pole for Darrell Waltrip.
- Final race for Junior Johnson & Associates; as Johnson would sell the #11 team to its driver, Brett Bodine, while the #27 team would go to attorney David Blair.

== Final points standings ==
(key) Bold - Pole position awarded by time. Italics - Pole position set by owner's points standings. *- Most laps led.

Pos	Driver	DAY	CAR	RCH	ATL	DAR	BRI	NWS	MAR	TAL	SON	CLT	DOV	POC	MCH	DAY	NHA	POC	TAL	IND	GLN	MCH	BRI	DAR	RCH	DOV	MAR	NWS	CLT	CAR	PHO	ATL	Points
1	Jeff Gordon	22	**1***	**36**	1*	**32***	1*	**2**	3	2	3	**33**	**6**	16*	**2***	1*	1*	2	8*	**6**	3	3*	6	1	6	1*	7	3	30	20	5	32	4614
2	Dale Earnhardt	2	3	2	**4**	2	25	1*	29	21	1	6	5	8	35	**3**	22	20	3	1	23	35	2	2*	**3**	5	1*	9	2	7	3	1*	4580
3	Sterling Marlin	1*	12	5	7	1	9	7	13	39	7	4	7	4	7	2*	9	18	**1**	7	21	4	7	10	33	6	23	15	6	6	12	2	4361
4	Mark Martin	3	7	8	9	37	**8***	3	5	1*	2*	28	35	11	8	4	**3***	7	7	5	**1***	38	**5**	33	15	8	12	1*	1	3	8	17	4320
5	Rusty Wallace	34	24	3*	10	23	2	4	1*	20	20	34	9	17	3	27	6	16*	30	2	26	5	21	3	1*	3	3	2	9	2	4	3	4240
6	Terry Labonte	8	26	1	3	34	7	16	36	**26**	5	2	37	1	9	19	4	14	33	13	5	2	1	19	2	15	2	4	3	4	13	13	4146
7	Ted Musgrave	4	33	13	19	3	18	6	2	11	6	15	3	2	10	5	8	4	11	16	13	28	13	22	10	11	29	**20**	19	22	6	27	3949
8	Bill Elliott	23	11	16	26	17	14	28	12	6	19	39	15	6	14	10	18	**5**	5	4*	11	9	23	41	14	18	6	10	20	10	**14**	4	3746
9	Ricky Rudd	13	4	21	8	41	5	29	30	22	**4**	5	31	13	38	8	5	3	41	20	4	30	36	6	8	10	27	5	**4***	13	1	10	3734
10	Bobby Labonte	30	2	30	2	27	32	15	**10**	5	13	1	2	27	1	41	15	35	31	9	6	**1**	11	8	17	9	14	18	8	40	37	8	3718
11	Morgan Shepherd	10	34	15	6	8	20	19	31	3	15	11	26	7	5	24	2	24	4	10	30	16	17	11	27	33	19	23	14	18	7	22	3618
12	Michael Waltrip	6	17	23	35	7	22	22	15	12	10	3	8	9	12	15	14	21	9	14	14	11	15	5	28	29	25	12	17	38	34	12	3601
13	Dale Jarrett	**5**	5	25	5	38	6	11	7	19	23	32	40	38	6	42	30	1	2	3	17	33	3*	28	4	30	10	7	5	23	11	31	3584
14	Bobby Hamilton	18	36	9	17	9	4	13	8	15	14	9	24	15	25	40	16	19	21	11	33	8	20	14	5	2	4	16	10	30	31	25	3576
15	Derrike Cope	31	8	6	13	5	13	30	28	42	12	19	12	20	19	13	7	39	15	40	15	34	10	15	34	7	9	13	11	19	2	35	3384
16	Geoff Bodine	20	21	11	30	13	23	14	35	7	22	26	27	14	21	14	35	6	24	15	9	27	12	35	19	24	5	11	16	15	16	11	3357
17	Ken Schrader	9	39	4	27	11	26	12	6	40	9	30*	11	**3**	27	6	10	40	32	19	36	26	14	23	9	12	32	8	35	33	10	42	3221
18	John Andretti	27	13	10	20	10	19	17	32	41	11	17	39	30	4	33	33	38	34	12	7	37	19	**12**	7	39	13	17	13	25	15	15	3140
19	Darrell Waltrip	32	38	7	34	21	3	10	4	4	35	18	20	42	26	34	17	36	43	17	8	15	4	40	22	36	8	14	34	12	38	**16**	3078
20	Brett Bodine	25	14	18	23	12	27	9	11	30	29	35	21	10	40	20	21	15	28	24	16	36	28	31	16	17	22	22	27	27	17	20	2988
21	Rick Mast	21	35	34	11	26	15	8	34	28	16	14	13	21	34	26	11	13	17	8	37	31	26	26	12	**28**	28	26	36	34*	9	21	2984
22	Ward Burton	15	9	22	DNQ	25	21	24	25	32	21	41	38	19	18	35	39	11	20	35	19	6	34	4	11	21	21	DNQ	7	1	42	5	2926
23	Lake Speed	14	32	14	15	29	17	25	26	16	40	8	34	28	11	21	24	22	35	34	20	17	29	9	21	32	20	35	21	24	22	19	2921
24	Ricky Craven **(R)**	16	16	38	12	42	29	33	18	17	25	10	22	26	33	22	31	25	26	31	10	7	32	18	29	22	35	21	25	8	24	30	2883
25	Dick Trickle	11	22	12	22	28	30	32	24	38	24	16	32	22	16	12	34	10	38	18	28	13	35	36	18	23	15	19	32	16	29	23	2875
26	Jimmy Spencer	DNQ	30	24	32	36	16	27	DNQ	9	17	27	29	41	30	9	12	17	10	23	18	14	18	29	31	16	18	36	12	26	33	6	2809
27	Steve Grissom	7	6	DNQ	18	6	11	5	20	37	26	13	16	18	20	43	28	31	25	30	22	29	22	27	DNQ	25	26	31	41	14	32	39	2757
28	Joe Nemechek	42	29	32	16	33	DNQ	20	14	DNQ	37	20	10	12	28	38	19	9	23	27	31	32	16	25	26	4	30	32	22	9	18	14	2742
29	Robert Pressley **(R)**	26	42	35	31	30	10	18	17	18	30	24	19	37	17	11	13	34	27	28	34	18	24	17	30	14	34	33	42	29	19	41	2663
30	Kyle Petty	12	10	33	14	35	35	31	9	31	28	29	1*	39	42	7	37	28	6	25	39	42	DNQ	24	25	26	11	30	15	32	39	33	2638
31	Jeremy Mayfield	35	18	17	36	31	DNQ	DNQ	16	14	DNQ	22	17	25	22	32	26	8	13	29	25	12	30	30	23	19	16	DNQ	29	11	20	18	2637
32	Jeff Burton	24	19	31	33	19	28	26	DNQ	25	18	40	25	36	31	18	25	27	22	38	38	23	9	16	13	20	31	DNQ	31	5	23	36	2556
33	Todd Bodine	37	31	37	21	4	33	21	DNQ	8	8	38	30	24	29	23	36	23	29	21	32	19	DNQ	42	24	37	24	DNQ	26	17	25	40	2372
34	Mike Wallace	39	15	26	40	15	DNQ	36	27	23	34	12	14	32	32	37	32	26	12	26	DNQ	20	8	39	DNQ	31	17	DNQ	23	39	36	DNQ	2178
35	Dave Marcis	36	23	20	28	24	34	34	23	34	27	37	36	31	15	25	29	33	19	DNQ	24	25	27	37	35	27	DNQ	28	40	DNQ	28	37	2126
36	Hut Stricklin						DNQ		33	24	33	7	4	5	37	16	27	41	36	22	40	10	33	7	32	38	36	25	18	**28**	35	38	2082
37	Bobby Hillin Jr.	DNQ										DNQ	42	23	13	28	20	12	16	39	27	39	DNQ	13	36	13	DNQ	24	24	21	21	9	1686
38	Elton Sawyer								20	27	DNQ	25	41		23		23	29	14	41	29	21	DNQ	32	38	40	33	34	28	31	30	28	1499
39	Greg Sacks	DNQ	41	19	29	22	36	35	22	35	DNQ	DNQ	28	33	DNQ	17				33		40	25	38	37	DNQ	DNQ	DNQ	33	37	43	34	1349
40	Randy LaJoie **(R)**	29	25	27	39	16	12	23	DNQ	13	32	23	23	40	41				40														1133
41	Loy Allen Jr.	17	28	29	DNQ	18				10		36	DNQ			31			39	DNQ		DNQ		34					37	DNQ		24	890
42	Kenny Wallace	DNQ	20	DNQ	DNQ	DNQ		DNQ	21	36		31	18		36	DNQ		37		36		24	DNQ		20		DNQ		DNQ		26		878
43	Chuck Bown					39	31	DNQ	DNQ			21	33	29	24	29	40		37														618
44	Jimmy Hensley		40	DNQ	38							DNQ				30	41	32	DNQ	32		22	DNQ				DNQ	29	39				558
45	Rich Bickle																38	30		37		DNQ	31	21		35	DNQ	27	38				538
46	Davy Jones **(R)**	33	37	DNQ	24	20	24	DNQ	DNQ	33	36	DNQ																					520
47	Jeff Purvis	38			37			DNQ		29		DNQ				39			42	DNQ									DNQ			26	391
48	Ernie Irvan																											6		DNQ	40*	7	354
49	Steve Kinser **(R)**	40	27	28	41	40	DNQ	DNQ																									287
50	Wally Dallenbach Jr.										39										2												221
51	Billy Standridge	DNQ	DNQ	DNQ	25	14	DNQ	DNQ		DNQ										DNQ				DNQ		DNQ			DNQ			DNQ	209
52	Gary Bradberry **(R)**	DNQ	DNQ	DNQ	DNQ										DNQ							41		DNQ					43	35		29	208
53	Chad Little	DNQ										42							18										DNQ		DNQ		146
54	Butch Leitzinger																				12												127
55	Doug George										31																				41		110
56	Joe Ruttman	19																		DNQ			DNQ										106
57	Ed Berrier																							20	DNQ								103
58	Ron Hornaday Jr.																														27		82
59	Ben Hess	28	DNQ	DNQ	DNQ																												79
60	Phil Parsons	41	DNQ		42	DNQ																											77
61	Jimmy Horton													34																		QL	61
62	Michael Ritch																									34							61
63	Pancho Carter				DNQ									35						DNQ													58
64	Ron Fellows																				35												58
65	Shane Hall																								DNQ					36	DNQ	DNQ	55
66	Andy Hillenburg															36																	55
67	Terry Fisher										38															DNQ							49
68	Ken Pederson										41																						40
69	Butch Gilliland										42																						37
70	Dan Obrist										43																						34
71	Ernie Cope										DNQ																				44		31
72	Mike Chase **(R)**	DNQ																															
73	Doug Heveron	DNQ																															
74	Ronnie Sanders	DNQ																															
75	Phil Barkdoll	DNQ																															
76	Shawna Robinson	DNQ																															
77	Jim Sauter	DNQ																															
78	Kerry Teague	DNQ																															
79	Bob Strait	DNQ																															
80	James Hylton	DNQ	DNQ																														
81	Ken Bouchard	DNQ			DNQ																												
82	Randy MacDonald	DNQ						DNQ										DNQ															
83	Ritchie Petty	DNQ								DNQ																							
84	Steve Seligman	DNQ								DNQ						DNQ			DNQ	DNQ													
85	Delma Cowart	DNQ								DNQ						DNQ			DNQ										DNQ			DNQ	
86	Terry Byers **(R)**	DNQ																DNQ															
87	Jay Hedgecock			DNQ				DNQ	DNQ																DNQ			DNQ		DNQ			
88	Eric Smith			DNQ													DNQ				DNQ				DNQ							DNQ	
89	Johnny Chapman				DNQ							DNQ																					
90	Brad Teague					DNQ	DNQ																	DNQ									
91	Butch Miller						DNQ																										
92	Garrett Evans										DNQ																						
93	St. James Davis										DNQ																						
94	Joe Heath										DNQ																						
95	Scott Gaylord										DNQ																				DNQ		
96	Doug French												DNQ	DNQ																			
97	A. J. Foyt																			DNQ											DNQ		
98	David Murry																				DNQ												
99	Tracy Leslie																					DNQ											
100	Tim Steele																					DNQ											
101	Richard Brickhouse																													DNQ			
102	Norm Benning																													DNQ			
103	Alan Russell																													DNQ			
104	Mike Bliss																														DNQ		
105	Wayne Jacks																														DNQ		
106	Rich Woodland Jr.																														DNQ		
107	L. J. Pryor																														DNQ		
108	Jack Sprague																															DNQ	
109	Danny Sullivan																			Wth													
110	Scott Brayton																			Wth													
111	David Green						RL																										
Pos	Driver	DAY	CAR	RCH	ATL	DAR	BRI	NWS	MAR	TAL	SON	CLT	DOV	POC	MCH	DAY	NHA	POC	TAL	IND	GLN	MCH	BRI	DAR	RCH	DOV	MAR	NWS	CLT	CAR	PHO	ATL	Points

== Rookie of the Year ==
29-year-old Ricky Craven from Newburgh, Maine received the 1995 Rookie of the Year award. Craven took the #41 Chevy owned by Sue and Larry Hedrick to four top-tens and finished 24th in the points. Runner-up was Craven's former Busch Series opponent Robert Pressley, posting one top-ten in the Leo Jackson Motorsports Chevy. The next runner-up, Randy LaJoie, began the year in the 22 car, but struggled and was released midway through the year. Steve Kinser and Davy Jones, a pair of open-wheel veterans who struggled in their transition to stock cars, were both released from their rides before the season reached the one-third point, while Mike Chase was released by his team after failing to qualify for the Daytona 500. Gary Bradberry and Terry Byers filed for Rookie of the Year contention but only ran limited schedules.

== See also ==
- 1994–95 NASCAR SuperTruck Series exhibition races
- 1995 NASCAR Busch Series
- 1995 NASCAR SuperTruck Series
- 1995 NASCAR Winston West Series
