= 1995 MBNA 500 =

25th race of the 1995 NASCAR Winston Cup Series

Race details
- Race 25 of 31 in the 1995 NASCAR Winston Cup Series
- The 1995 Miller 500 program cover.
- Date: September 17, 1995
- Official name: 27th Annual MBNA 500
- Location: Dover, Delaware, Dover International Speedway
- Course: Permanent racing facility
- Course length: 1 miles (1.6 km)
- Distance: 500 laps, 500 mi (804.672 km)
- Scheduled distance: 500 laps, 500 mi (804.672 km)
- Average speed: 124.74 miles per hour (200.75 km/h)

Pole position
Driver	Rick Mast	Precision Products Racing
- Time: 23.461

Most laps led
Driver	Jeff Gordon	Hendrick Motorsports
- Laps: 400

Winner
No. 24	Jeff Gordon	Hendrick Motorsports

Television in the United States
- Network: TNN
- Announcers: Mike Joy, Dick Berggren, Buddy Baker

Radio in the United States
- Radio: Motor Racing Network

The 1995 MBNA 500 was the 25th stock car race of the 1995 NASCAR Winston Cup Series and the 27th iteration of the event. The race was held on Sunday, September 17, 1995, in Dover, Delaware at Dover International Speedway, a 1-mile (1.6 km) permanent oval-shaped racetrack. The race took the scheduled 500 laps to complete. At race's end, Hendrick Motorsports driver Jeff Gordon would manage to dominate the race to take his ninth career NASCAR Winston Cup Series victory and his seventh and final victory of the season. To fill out the top three, Petty Enterprises driver Bobby Hamilton and Penske Racing South driver Rusty Wallace would finish second and third, respectively.

== Background ==
The layout of Dover International Speedway, the venue where the race was held.

Dover International Speedway is an oval race track in Dover, Delaware, United States that has held at least two NASCAR races since it opened in 1969. In addition to NASCAR, the track also hosted USAC and the NTT IndyCar Series. The track features one layout, a 1-mile (1.6 km) concrete oval, with 24° banking in the turns and 9° banking on the straights. The speedway is owned and operated by Dover Motorsports.

The track, nicknamed "The Monster Mile", was built in 1969 by Melvin Joseph of Melvin L. Joseph Construction Company, Inc., with an asphalt surface, but was replaced with concrete in 1995. Six years later in 2001, the track's capacity moved to 135,000 seats, making the track have the largest capacity of sports venue in the mid-Atlantic. In 2002, the name changed to Dover International Speedway from Dover Downs International Speedway after Dover Downs Gaming and Entertainment split, making Dover Motorsports. From 2007 to 2009, the speedway worked on an improvement project called "The Monster Makeover", which expanded facilities at the track and beautified the track. After the 2014 season, the track's capacity was reduced to 95,500 seats.

=== Entry list ===
- (R) denotes rookie driver.

#	Driver	Team	Make
1	Rick Mast	Precision Products Racing	Pontiac
2	Rusty Wallace	Penske Racing South	Ford
3	Dale Earnhardt	Richard Childress Racing	Chevrolet
4	Sterling Marlin	Morgan–McClure Motorsports	Chevrolet
5	Terry Labonte	Hendrick Motorsports	Chevrolet
6	Mark Martin	Roush Racing	Ford
7	Geoff Bodine	Geoff Bodine Racing	Ford
8	Jeff Burton	Stavola Brothers Racing	Ford
9	Lake Speed	Melling Racing	Ford
10	Ricky Rudd	Rudd Performance Motorsports	Ford
11	Brett Bodine	Junior Johnson & Associates	Ford
12	Derrike Cope	Bobby Allison Motorsports	Ford
15	Dick Trickle	Bud Moore Engineering	Ford
16	Ted Musgrave	Roush Racing	Ford
17	Darrell Waltrip	Darrell Waltrip Motorsports	Chevrolet
18	Bobby Labonte	Joe Gibbs Racing	Chevrolet
21	Morgan Shepherd	Wood Brothers Racing	Ford
22	Ward Burton	Bill Davis Racing	Pontiac
23	Jimmy Spencer	Haas-Carter Motorsports	Ford
24	Jeff Gordon	Hendrick Motorsports	Chevrolet
25	Ken Schrader	Hendrick Motorsports	Chevrolet
26	Hut Stricklin	King Racing	Ford
27	Elton Sawyer	Junior Johnson & Associates	Ford
28	Dale Jarrett	Robert Yates Racing	Ford
29	Steve Grissom	Diamond Ridge Motorsports	Chevrolet
30	Michael Waltrip	Bahari Racing	Pontiac
31	Greg Sacks	A.G. Dillard Motorsports	Chevrolet
32	Michael Ritch	Active Motorsports	Chevrolet
33	Robert Pressley (R)	Leo Jackson Motorsports	Chevrolet
37	John Andretti	Kranefuss-Haas Racing	Ford
40	Rich Bickle	Dick Brooks Racing	Pontiac
41	Ricky Craven (R)	Larry Hedrick Motorsports	Chevrolet
42	Kyle Petty	Team SABCO	Pontiac
43	Bobby Hamilton	Petty Enterprises	Pontiac
66	Billy Standridge	Johnson Standridge Racing	Ford
67	Terry Fisher	RaDiUs Motorsports	Ford
71	Dave Marcis	Marcis Auto Racing	Chevrolet
75	Todd Bodine	Butch Mock Motorsports	Ford
77	Bobby Hillin Jr.	Jasper Motorsports	Ford
87	Joe Nemechek	NEMCO Motorsports	Chevrolet
90	Mike Wallace	Donlavey Racing	Ford
94	Bill Elliott	Elliott-Hardy Racing	Ford
98	Jeremy Mayfield	Cale Yarborough Motorsports	Ford

== Qualifying ==
Qualifying was split into two rounds. The first round was held on Friday, September 15, at 3:00 PM EST. Each driver would have one lap to set a time. During the first round, the top 25 drivers in the round would be guaranteed a starting spot in the race. If a driver was not able to guarantee a spot in the first round, they had the option to scrub their time from the first round and try and run a faster lap time in a second round qualifying run, held on Saturday, September 16, at 11:45 AM EST. As with the first round, each driver would have one lap to set a time. For this specific race, positions 26-38 would be decided on time, and depending on who needed it, a select amount of positions were given to cars who had not otherwise qualified but were high enough in owner's points; which was usually four. If needed, a past champion who did not qualify on either time or provisionals could use a champion's provisional, adding one more spot to the field.

Rick Mast, driving for Precision Products Racing, would win the pole, setting a time of 23.461 and an average speed of 153.446 miles per hour (246.947 km/h) in the first round.

Three drivers would fail to qualify.

=== Full qualifying results ===
Pos.	#	Driver	Team	Make	Time	Speed
1	1	Rick Mast	Precision Products Racing	Ford	23.461	153.446
2	24	Jeff Gordon	Hendrick Motorsports	Chevrolet	23.502	153.178
3	42	Kyle Petty	Team SABCO	Pontiac	23.555	152.834
4	18	Bobby Labonte	Joe Gibbs Racing	Chevrolet	23.558	152.814
5	22	Ward Burton	Bill Davis Racing	Pontiac	23.559	152.808
6	10	Ricky Rudd	Rudd Performance Motorsports	Ford	23.576	152.698
7	2	Rusty Wallace	Penske Racing South	Ford	23.587	152.626
8	26	Hut Stricklin	King Racing	Ford	23.631	152.342
9	37	John Andretti	Kranefuss-Haas Racing	Ford	23.690	151.963
10	98	Jeremy Mayfield	Cale Yarborough Motorsports	Ford	23.690	151.963
11	75	Todd Bodine	Butch Mock Motorsports	Ford	23.698	151.912
12	33	Robert Pressley (R)	Leo Jackson Motorsports	Chevrolet	23.703	151.880
13	16	Ted Musgrave	Roush Racing	Ford	23.717	151.790
14	29	Steve Grissom	Diamond Ridge Motorsports	Chevrolet	23.725	151.739
15	15	Dick Trickle	Bud Moore Engineering	Ford	23.729	151.713
16	6	Mark Martin	Roush Racing	Ford	23.734	151.681
17	94	Bill Elliott	Elliott-Hardy Racing	Ford	23.735	151.675
18	12	Derrike Cope	Bobby Allison Motorsports	Ford	23.749	151.585
19	17	Darrell Waltrip	Darrell Waltrip Motorsports	Chevrolet	23.755	151.547
20	5	Terry Labonte	Hendrick Motorsports	Chevrolet	23.757	151.534
21	40	Rich Bickle	Dick Brooks Racing	Pontiac	23.767	151.471
22	41	Ricky Craven (R)	Larry Hedrick Motorsports	Chevrolet	23.777	151.407
23	77	Bobby Hillin Jr.	Jasper Motorsports	Ford	23.778	151.400
24	87	Joe Nemechek	NEMCO Motorsports	Chevrolet	23.784	151.362
25	8	Jeff Burton	Stavola Brothers Racing	Ford	23.788	151.337
Failed to lock in Round 1
26	28	Dale Jarrett	Robert Yates Racing	Ford	23.571	152.730
27	9	Lake Speed	Melling Racing	Ford	23.592	152.594
28	3	Dale Earnhardt	Richard Childress Racing	Chevrolet	23.648	152.233
29	4	Sterling Marlin	Morgan–McClure Motorsports	Chevrolet	23.657	152.175
30	30	Michael Waltrip	Bahari Racing	Pontiac	23.677	152.046
31	21	Morgan Shepherd	Wood Brothers Racing	Ford	23.727	151.726
32	43	Bobby Hamilton	Petty Enterprises	Pontiac	23.729	151.713
33	27	Elton Sawyer	Junior Johnson & Associates	Ford	23.730	151.707
34	23	Jimmy Spencer	Travis Carter Enterprises	Ford	23.760	151.515
35	71	Dave Marcis	Marcis Auto Racing	Chevrolet	23.788	151.337
36	25	Ken Schrader	Hendrick Motorsports	Chevrolet	23.806	151.222
37	11	Brett Bodine	Junior Johnson & Associates	Ford	23.826	151.095
38	90	Mike Wallace	Donlavey Racing	Ford	23.836	151.032
Provisionals
39	7	Geoff Bodine	Geoff Bodine Racing	Ford	-*	-*
40	32	Michael Ritch	Active Motorsports	Chevrolet	-*	-*
Failed to qualify
41	66	Billy Standridge	Johnson Standridge Racing	Ford	-*	-*
42	67	Terry Fisher	RaDiUs Motorsports	Ford	-*	-*
43	31	Greg Sacks	A.G. Dillard Motorsports	Chevrolet	-*	-*
Official first round qualifying results
Official starting lineup

== Race results ==
Fin	St	#	Driver	Team	Make	Laps	Led	Status	Pts	Winnings
1	2	24	Jeff Gordon	Hendrick Motorsports	Chevrolet	500	400	running	185	$74,655
2	32	43	Bobby Hamilton	Petty Enterprises	Pontiac	500	83	running	175	$62,505
3	7	2	Rusty Wallace	Penske Racing South	Ford	500	0	running	165	$46,905
4	24	87	Joe Nemechek	NEMCO Motorsports	Chevrolet	500	0	running	160	$34,465
5	28	3	Dale Earnhardt	Richard Childress Racing	Chevrolet	500	0	running	155	$40,970
6	29	4	Sterling Marlin	Morgan–McClure Motorsports	Chevrolet	500	0	running	150	$31,515
7	18	12	Derrike Cope	Bobby Allison Motorsports	Ford	499	1	running	151	$22,155
8	16	6	Mark Martin	Roush Racing	Ford	499	0	running	142	$31,065
9	4	18	Bobby Labonte	Joe Gibbs Racing	Chevrolet	498	0	running	138	$29,415
10	6	10	Ricky Rudd	Rudd Performance Motorsports	Ford	498	0	running	134	$33,665
11	13	16	Ted Musgrave	Roush Racing	Ford	498	0	running	130	$24,665
12	36	25	Ken Schrader	Hendrick Motorsports	Chevrolet	498	0	running	127	$24,065
13	23	77	Bobby Hillin Jr.	Jasper Motorsports	Ford	497	0	running	124	$14,465
14	12	33	Robert Pressley (R)	Leo Jackson Motorsports	Chevrolet	495	11	running	126	$24,365
15	20	5	Terry Labonte	Hendrick Motorsports	Chevrolet	495	0	running	118	$29,865
16	34	23	Jimmy Spencer	Travis Carter Enterprises	Ford	495	0	running	115	$17,815
17	37	11	Brett Bodine	Junior Johnson & Associates	Ford	494	0	running	112	$26,615
18	17	94	Bill Elliott	Elliott-Hardy Racing	Ford	494	0	running	109	$17,500
19	10	98	Jeremy Mayfield	Cale Yarborough Motorsports	Ford	493	0	running	106	$17,215
20	25	8	Jeff Burton	Stavola Brothers Racing	Ford	493	0	running	103	$23,815
21	5	22	Ward Burton	Bill Davis Racing	Pontiac	493	0	running	100	$21,915
22	22	41	Ricky Craven (R)	Larry Hedrick Motorsports	Chevrolet	492	0	running	97	$17,265
23	15	15	Dick Trickle	Bud Moore Engineering	Ford	492	0	running	94	$21,615
24	39	7	Geoff Bodine	Geoff Bodine Racing	Ford	491	0	running	91	$27,765
25	14	29	Steve Grissom	Diamond Ridge Motorsports	Chevrolet	491	0	running	88	$16,615
26	3	42	Kyle Petty	Team SABCO	Pontiac	490	0	running	85	$21,365
27	35	71	Dave Marcis	Marcis Auto Racing	Chevrolet	482	0	running	82	$16,115
28	1	1	Rick Mast	Precision Products Racing	Ford	439	3	engine	84	$26,965
29	30	30	Michael Waltrip	Bahari Racing	Pontiac	425	1	running	81	$20,915
30	26	28	Dale Jarrett	Robert Yates Racing	Ford	410	1	crash	78	$29,765
31	38	90	Mike Wallace	Donlavey Racing	Ford	403	0	crash	70	$12,815
32	27	9	Lake Speed	Melling Racing	Ford	267	0	handling	67	$15,255
33	31	21	Morgan Shepherd	Wood Brothers Racing	Ford	262	0	engine	64	$17,705
34	40	32	Michael Ritch	Active Motorsports	Chevrolet	226	0	engine	61	$12,655
35	21	40	Rich Bickle	Dick Brooks Racing	Pontiac	218	0	engine	58	$17,605
36	19	17	Darrell Waltrip	Darrell Waltrip Motorsports	Chevrolet	148	0	handling	55	$17,430
37	11	75	Todd Bodine	Butch Mock Motorsports	Ford	53	0	crash	52	$17,430
38	8	26	Hut Stricklin	King Racing	Ford	48	0	crash	49	$17,430
39	9	37	John Andretti	Kranefuss-Haas Racing	Ford	39	0	crash	46	$12,430
40	33	27	Elton Sawyer	Junior Johnson & Associates	Ford	10	0	crash	43	$20,430
Official race results

Previous race: 1995 Miller Genuine Draft 400 (Richmond)	NASCAR Winston Cup Series; 1995 season	Next race: 1995 Goody's 500 (Martinsville)
