= 1995 TranSouth Financial 400 =

Fifth race of the 1995 NASCAR Winston Cup Series

Race details
- Race 5 of 31 in the 1995 NASCAR Winston Cup Series
- The 1995 TranSouth Financial 400 program cover, featuring Dale Earnhardt and Mark Martin.
- Date: March 26, 1995
- Official name: 39th Annual TranSouth Financial 400
- Location: Darlington, South Carolina, Darlington Raceway
- Course: Permanent racing facility
- Course length: 1.366 miles (2.198 km)
- Distance: 293 laps, 400.238 mi (644.12 km)
- Scheduled distance: 293 laps, 400.238 mi (644.12 km)
- Average speed: 111.392 miles per hour (179.268 km/h)

Pole position
Driver	Jeff Gordon	Hendrick Motorsports
- Time: 28.786

Most laps led
Driver	Jeff Gordon	Hendrick Motorsports
- Laps: 156

Winner
No. 4	Sterling Marlin	Morgan-McClure Motorsports

Television in the United States
- Network: ESPN
- Announcers: Bob Jenkins, Ned Jarrett, Benny Parsons

Radio in the United States
- Radio: Motor Racing Network

The 1995 TranSouth Financial 400 was the fifth stock car race of the 1995 NASCAR Winston Cup Series and the 39th iteration of the event. The race was held on Sunday, March 26, 1995, in Darlington, South Carolina, at Darlington Raceway, a 1.366 miles (2.198 km) permanent egg-shaped oval racetrack. The race took the scheduled 293 laps to complete. In a wreck-filled race, Morgan–McClure Motorsports driver Sterling Marlin would manage to make a late-race pass for the lead with 12 to go to take his third career NASCAR Winston Cup Series victory and his second victory of the season. To fill out the top three, Richard Childress Racing driver Dale Earnhardt and Roush Racing driver Ted Musgrave would finish second and third, respectively.

== Background ==
The layout of Darlington Raceway, the venue where the race was held.

Darlington Raceway is a race track built for NASCAR racing located near Darlington, South Carolina. It is nicknamed "The Lady in Black" and "The Track Too Tough to Tame" by many NASCAR fans and drivers and advertised as "A NASCAR Tradition." It is of a unique, somewhat egg-shaped design, an oval with the ends of very different configurations, a condition which supposedly arose from the proximity of one end of the track to a minnow pond the owner refused to relocate. This situation makes it very challenging for the crews to set up their cars' handling in a way that is effective at both ends.

=== Entry list ===
- (R) denotes rookie driver.

#	Driver	Team	Make
1	Rick Mast	Precision Products Racing	Pontiac
2	Rusty Wallace	Penske Racing South	Ford
3	Dale Earnhardt	Richard Childress Racing	Chevrolet
4	Sterling Marlin	Morgan–McClure Motorsports	Chevrolet
5	Terry Labonte	Hendrick Motorsports	Chevrolet
6	Mark Martin	Roush Racing	Ford
7	Geoff Bodine	Geoff Bodine Racing	Ford
8	Jeff Burton	Stavola Brothers Racing	Ford
9	Lake Speed	Melling Racing	Ford
10	Ricky Rudd	Rudd Performance Motorsports	Ford
11	Brett Bodine	Brett Bodine Racing	Ford
12	Derrike Cope	Bobby Allison Motorsports	Ford
15	Dick Trickle	Bud Moore Engineering	Ford
16	Ted Musgrave	Roush Racing	Ford
17	Darrell Waltrip	Darrell Waltrip Motorsports	Chevrolet
18	Bobby Labonte	Joe Gibbs Racing	Chevrolet
19	Phil Parsons	TriStar Motorsports	Ford
21	Morgan Shepherd	Wood Brothers Racing	Ford
22	Randy LaJoie (R)	Bill Davis Racing	Pontiac
23	Jimmy Spencer	Haas-Carter Motorsports	Ford
24	Jeff Gordon	Hendrick Motorsports	Chevrolet
25	Ken Schrader	Hendrick Motorsports	Chevrolet
26	Steve Kinser	King Racing	Ford
27	Loy Allen Jr.	Junior Johnson & Associates	Ford
28	Dale Jarrett	Robert Yates Racing	Ford
29	Steve Grissom	Diamond Ridge Motorsports	Chevrolet
30	Michael Waltrip	Bahari Racing	Pontiac
31	Ward Burton	A.G. Dillard Motorsports	Chevrolet
32	Chuck Bown	Active Motorsports	Chevrolet
33	Robert Pressley (R)	Leo Jackson Motorsports	Chevrolet
37	John Andretti	Kranefuss-Haas Racing	Ford
40	Greg Sacks	Dick Brooks Racing	Pontiac
41	Ricky Craven (R)	Larry Hedrick Motorsports	Chevrolet
42	Kyle Petty	Team SABCO	Pontiac
43	Bobby Hamilton	Petty Enterprises	Pontiac
47	Billy Standridge	Standridge Motorsports	Ford
52	Brad Teague	Jimmy Means Racing	Ford
71	Dave Marcis	Marcis Auto Racing	Chevrolet
75	Todd Bodine	Butch Mock Motorsports	Ford
77	Davy Jones (R)	Jasper Motorsports	Ford
81	Kenny Wallace	FILMAR Racing	Ford
87	Joe Nemechek	NEMCO Motorsports	Chevrolet
90	Mike Wallace	Donlavey Racing	Ford
94	Bill Elliott	Elliott-Hardy Racing	Ford
98	Jeremy Mayfield	Cale Yarborough Motorsports	Ford

== Qualifying ==
Qualifying was split into two rounds. The first round was held on Friday, March 24, at 2:30 PM EST. Each driver would have one lap to set a time. During the first round, the top 20 drivers in the round would be guaranteed a starting spot in the race. If a driver was not able to guarantee a spot in the first round, they had the option to scrub their time from the first round and try and run a faster lap time in a second round qualifying run, held on Saturday, March 25, at 10:00 AM EST. As with the first round, each driver would have one lap to set a time. For this specific race, positions 20-38 would be decided on time, and depending on who needed it, a select amount of positions were given to cars who had not otherwise qualified but were high enough in owner's points; which was usually four. If needed, a past champion who did not qualify on either time or provisionals could use a champion's provisional, adding one more spot to the field.

Jeff Gordon, driving for Hendrick Motorsports, won the pole, setting a time of 28.786 and an average speed of 170.833 mph (274.929 km/h) in the first round.

Three drivers would fail to qualify: Kenny Wallace, Brad Teague, and Phil Parsons.

=== Full qualifying results ===
Pos.	#	Driver	Team	Make	Time	Speed
1	24	Jeff Gordon	Hendrick Motorsports	Chevrolet	28.786	170.833
2	5	Terry Labonte	Hendrick Motorsports	Chevrolet	28.952	169.854
3	25	Ken Schrader	Hendrick Motorsports	Chevrolet	28.967	169.766
4	10	Ricky Rudd	Rudd Performance Motorsports	Ford	29.001	169.567
5	4	Sterling Marlin	Morgan–McClure Motorsports	Chevrolet	29.025	169.426
6	17	Darrell Waltrip	Darrell Waltrip Motorsports	Chevrolet	29.190	168.469
7	31	Ward Burton	A.G. Dillard Motorsports	Chevrolet	29.218	168.307
8	2	Rusty Wallace	Penske Racing South	Ford	29.228	168.250
9	33	Robert Pressley (R)	Leo Jackson Motorsports	Chevrolet	29.242	168.169
10	87	Joe Nemechek	NEMCO Motorsports	Chevrolet	29.275	167.980
11	18	Bobby Labonte	Joe Gibbs Racing	Chevrolet	29.278	167.962
12	6	Mark Martin	Roush Racing	Ford	29.298	167.848
13	12	Derrike Cope	Bobby Allison Motorsports	Ford	29.331	167.659
14	41	Ricky Craven (R)	Larry Hedrick Motorsports	Chevrolet	29.333	167.647
15	37	John Andretti	Kranefuss-Haas Racing	Ford	29.380	167.379
16	21	Morgan Shepherd	Wood Brothers Racing	Ford	29.401	167.260
17	94	Bill Elliott	Elliott-Hardy Racing	Ford	29.414	167.186
18	16	Ted Musgrave	Roush Racing	Ford	29.430	167.095
19	15	Dick Trickle	Bud Moore Engineering	Ford	29.436	167.061
20	8	Jeff Burton	Stavola Brothers Racing	Ford	29.444	167.015
Failed to lock in Round 1
21	11	Brett Bodine	Brett Bodine Racing	Ford	29.187	168.486
22	9	Lake Speed	Melling Racing	Ford	29.188	168.480
23	3	Dale Earnhardt	Richard Childress Racing	Chevrolet	29.204	168.388
24	29	Steve Grissom	Diamond Ridge Motorsports	Chevrolet	29.207	168.371
25	43	Bobby Hamilton	Petty Enterprises	Pontiac	29.372	167.425
26	28	Dale Jarrett	Robert Yates Racing	Ford	29.387	167.339
27	7	Geoff Bodine	Geoff Bodine Racing	Ford	29.434	167.072
28	30	Michael Waltrip	Bahari Racing	Pontiac	29.467	166.885
29	23	Jimmy Spencer	Travis Carter Enterprises	Ford	29.518	166.597
30	40	Greg Sacks	Dick Brooks Racing	Pontiac	29.525	166.557
31	75	Todd Bodine	Butch Mock Motorsports	Ford	29.542	166.461
32	26	Steve Kinser	King Racing	Ford	29.567	166.321
33	22	Randy LaJoie (R)	Bill Davis Racing	Pontiac	29.584	166.225
34	77	Davy Jones (R)	Jasper Motorsports	Ford	29.614	166.057
35	98	Jeremy Mayfield	Cale Yarborough Motorsports	Ford	29.632	165.956
36	47	Billy Standridge	Standridge Motorsports	Ford	29.635	165.939
37	32	Chuck Bown	Active Motorsports	Chevrolet	29.651	165.849
38	42	Kyle Petty	Team SABCO	Pontiac	29.690	165.632
Provisionals
39	1	Rick Mast	Precision Products Racing	Ford	-*	-*
40	71	Dave Marcis	Marcis Auto Racing	Chevrolet	-*	-*
41	90	Mike Wallace	Donlavey Racing	Ford	-*	-*
42	27	Loy Allen Jr.	Junior Johnson & Associates	Ford	-*	-*
Failed to qualify
43	81	Kenny Wallace	FILMAR Racing	Ford	-*	-*
44	52	Brad Teague	Jimmy Means Racing	Ford	-*	-*
45	19	Phil Parsons	TriStar Motorsports	Ford	-*	-*
Official first round qualifying results
Official starting lineup

== Race results ==
Fin	St	#	Driver	Team	Make	Laps	Led	Status	Pts	Winnings
1	5	4	Sterling Marlin	Morgan–McClure Motorsports	Chevrolet	293	43	running	180	$86,185
2	23	3	Dale Earnhardt	Richard Childress Racing	Chevrolet	293	37	running	175	$54,355
3	18	16	Ted Musgrave	Roush Racing	Ford	293	21	running	170	$43,565
4	31	75	Todd Bodine	Butch Mock Motorsports	Ford	293	0	running	160	$36,570
5	13	12	Derrike Cope	Bobby Allison Motorsports	Ford	293	0	running	155	$22,950
6	24	29	Steve Grissom	Diamond Ridge Motorsports	Chevrolet	293	4	running	155	$18,600
7	28	30	Michael Waltrip	Bahari Racing	Pontiac	293	1	running	151	$22,720
8	16	21	Morgan Shepherd	Wood Brothers Racing	Ford	293	1	running	147	$21,990
9	25	43	Bobby Hamilton	Petty Enterprises	Pontiac	293	0	running	138	$16,385
10	15	37	John Andretti	Kranefuss-Haas Racing	Ford	292	0	running	134	$13,980
11	3	25	Ken Schrader	Hendrick Motorsports	Chevrolet	291	0	running	130	$20,500
12	21	11	Brett Bodine	Brett Bodine Racing	Ford	290	0	running	127	$24,820
13	27	7	Geoff Bodine	Geoff Bodine Racing	Ford	288	8	running	129	$25,610
14	36	47	Billy Standridge	Standridge Motorsports	Ford	287	0	running	121	$10,805
15	41	90	Mike Wallace	Donlavey Racing	Ford	287	0	running	118	$15,000
16	33	22	Randy LaJoie (R)	Bill Davis Racing	Pontiac	285	0	running	115	$20,630
17	17	94	Bill Elliott	Elliott-Hardy Racing	Ford	272	0	running	112	$10,275
18	42	27	Loy Allen Jr.	Junior Johnson & Associates	Ford	249	0	running	109	$18,140
19	20	8	Jeff Burton	Stavola Brothers Racing	Ford	242	2	running	111	$18,595
20	34	77	Davy Jones (R)	Jasper Motorsports	Ford	241	0	running	103	$15,065
21	6	17	Darrell Waltrip	Darrell Waltrip Motorsports	Chevrolet	239	0	running	100	$18,095
22	30	40	Greg Sacks	Dick Brooks Racing	Pontiac	236	0	running	97	$17,875
23	8	2	Rusty Wallace	Penske Racing South	Ford	235	0	running	94	$24,630
24	40	71	Dave Marcis	Marcis Auto Racing	Chevrolet	228	0	running	91	$9,310
25	7	31	Ward Burton	A.G. Dillard Motorsports	Chevrolet	227	0	running	88	$9,390
26	39	1	Rick Mast	Precision Products Racing	Ford	216	0	crash	85	$17,275
27	11	18	Bobby Labonte	Joe Gibbs Racing	Chevrolet	216	0	crash	82	$17,110
28	19	15	Dick Trickle	Bud Moore Engineering	Ford	216	0	crash	79	$16,950
29	22	9	Lake Speed	Melling Racing	Ford	216	0	running	76	$8,890
30	9	33	Robert Pressley (R)	Leo Jackson Motorsports	Chevrolet	212	0	running	73	$16,805
31	35	98	Jeremy Mayfield	Cale Yarborough Motorsports	Ford	203	18	running	75	$11,745
32	1	24	Jeff Gordon	Hendrick Motorsports	Chevrolet	200	156	crash	77	$20,875
33	10	87	Joe Nemechek	NEMCO Motorsports	Chevrolet	197	0	running	64	$8,650
34	2	5	Terry Labonte	Hendrick Motorsports	Chevrolet	193	0	running	61	$23,565
35	38	42	Kyle Petty	Team SABCO	Pontiac	190	0	crash	58	$13,580
36	29	23	Jimmy Spencer	Travis Carter Enterprises	Ford	183	2	running	60	$8,545
37	12	6	Mark Martin	Roush Racing	Ford	157	0	running	52	$22,531
38	26	28	Dale Jarrett	Robert Yates Racing	Ford	133	0	transmission	49	$22,809
39	37	32	Chuck Bown	Active Motorsports	Chevrolet	113	0	oil leak	46	$8,409
40	32	26	Steve Kinser	King Racing	Ford	95	0	engine	43	$13,409
41	4	10	Ricky Rudd	Rudd Performance Motorsports	Ford	74	0	crash	40	$21,409
42	14	41	Ricky Craven (R)	Larry Hedrick Motorsports	Chevrolet	47	0	rocker arm	37	$8,409
Official race results

Previous race: 1995 Purolator 500	NASCAR Winston Cup Series; 1995 season	Next race: 1995 Food City 500
