= 1995 Goody's 500 (Martinsville) =

26th race of the 1995 NASCAR Winston Cup Series

Race details
- Race 26 of 31 in the 1995 NASCAR Winston Cup Series
- The 1995 Goody's 500 program cover, featuring Rusty Wallace and Dale Earnhardt.
- Date: September 24, 1995
- Official name: 47th Annual Goody's 500
- Location: Ridgeway, Virginia, Martinsville Speedway
- Course: Permanent racing facility
- Course length: 0.526 miles (0.847 km)
- Distance: 500 laps, 263 mi (423.257 km)
- Scheduled distance: 500 laps, 263 mi (423.257 km)
- Average speed: 73.946 miles per hour (119.005 km/h)

Pole position
Driver	Jeff Gordon	Hendrick Motorsports
- Time: Set by 1995 owner's points

Most laps led
Driver	Dale Earnhardt	Richard Childress Racing
- Laps: 253

Winner
No. 3	Dale Earnhardt	Richard Childress Racing

Television in the United States
- Network: ESPN
- Announcers: Bob Jenkins, Ned Jarrett, Benny Parsons

Radio in the United States
- Radio: Motor Racing Network

The 1995 Goody's 500 was the 26th stock car race of the 1995 NASCAR Winston Cup Series and the 47th iteration of the event. The race was held on Sunday, September 24, 1995, in Martinsville, Virginia at Martinsville Speedway, a 0.526 miles (0.847 km) permanent oval-shaped short track. The race took the scheduled 500 laps to complete. In the final laps of the race, Richard Childress Racing driver Dale Earnhardt would make a late race pass on Penske Racing South driver Rusty Wallace with eight to go to take his 67th career NASCAR Winston Cup Series victory and his fourth victory of the season, while in the process cutting down his points deficit down to 275 points with points leader Jeff Gordon. To fill out the top three, Hendrick Motorsports driver Terry Labonte and the aforementioned Wallace would finish second and third, respectively.

== Background ==
The layout of Martinsville Speedway, the venue where the race was held.

Martinsville Speedway is a NASCAR-owned stock car racing track located in Henry County, in Ridgeway, Virginia, just to the south of Martinsville. At 0.526 miles (0.847 km) in length, it is the shortest track in the NASCAR Cup Series. The track was also one of the first paved oval tracks in NASCAR, being built in 1947 by H. Clay Earles. It is also the only remaining race track that has been on the NASCAR circuit from its beginning in 1948.

=== Entry list ===
- (R) denotes rookie driver.

#	Driver	Team	Make
1	Rick Mast	Precision Products Racing	Pontiac
2	Rusty Wallace	Penske Racing South	Ford
3	Dale Earnhardt	Richard Childress Racing	Chevrolet
4	Sterling Marlin	Morgan–McClure Motorsports	Chevrolet
5	Terry Labonte	Hendrick Motorsports	Chevrolet
6	Mark Martin	Roush Racing	Ford
7	Geoff Bodine	Geoff Bodine Racing	Ford
8	Jeff Burton	Stavola Brothers Racing	Ford
9	Lake Speed	Melling Racing	Ford
10	Ricky Rudd	Rudd Performance Motorsports	Ford
11	Brett Bodine	Junior Johnson & Associates	Ford
12	Derrike Cope	Bobby Allison Motorsports	Ford
15	Dick Trickle	Bud Moore Engineering	Ford
16	Ted Musgrave	Roush Racing	Ford
17	Darrell Waltrip	Darrell Waltrip Motorsports	Chevrolet
18	Bobby Labonte	Joe Gibbs Racing	Chevrolet
21	Morgan Shepherd	Wood Brothers Racing	Ford
22	Ward Burton	Bill Davis Racing	Pontiac
23	Jimmy Spencer	Haas-Carter Motorsports	Ford
24	Jeff Gordon	Hendrick Motorsports	Chevrolet
25	Ken Schrader	Hendrick Motorsports	Chevrolet
26	Hut Stricklin	King Racing	Ford
27	Elton Sawyer	Junior Johnson & Associates	Ford
28	Dale Jarrett	Robert Yates Racing	Ford
29	Steve Grissom	Diamond Ridge Motorsports	Chevrolet
30	Michael Waltrip	Bahari Racing	Pontiac
31	Jimmy Hensley	A.G. Dillard Motorsports	Chevrolet
32	Greg Sacks	Active Motorsports	Chevrolet
33	Robert Pressley (R)	Leo Jackson Motorsports	Chevrolet
37	John Andretti	Kranefuss-Haas Racing	Ford
40	Rich Bickle	Dick Brooks Racing	Pontiac
41	Ricky Craven (R)	Larry Hedrick Motorsports	Chevrolet
42	Kyle Petty	Team SABCO	Pontiac
43	Bobby Hamilton	Petty Enterprises	Pontiac
71	Dave Marcis	Marcis Auto Racing	Chevrolet
75	Todd Bodine	Butch Mock Motorsports	Ford
77	Bobby Hillin Jr.	Jasper Motorsports	Ford
81	Kenny Wallace	FILMAR Racing	Ford
87	Joe Nemechek	NEMCO Motorsports	Chevrolet
90	Mike Wallace	Donlavey Racing	Ford
94	Bill Elliott	Elliott-Hardy Racing	Ford
98	Jeremy Mayfield	Cale Yarborough Motorsports	Ford

== Qualifying ==
Two round of qualifying were scheduled to be held on Friday, September 22, and Saturday, September 23. However, Friday's sessions were cancelled due to rain, with both rounds then scheduled to commence on Saturday. However, Saturday's sessions would also be cancelled due to rain, leaving qualifying to be determined by a system of owner's points and postmarks on entry list blanks. The top 30 positions would be determined by the current 1995 owner's points, while the final six spots would be determined by a system of provisionals that included past winners, and finally postmarks. As a result, Hendrick Motorsports driver Jeff Gordon would win the pole.

Six drivers would fail to qualify.

=== Full qualifying results ===
Pos.	#	Driver	Team	Make
1	24	Jeff Gordon	Hendrick Motorsports	Chevrolet
2	3	Dale Earnhardt	Richard Childress Racing	Chevrolet
3	4	Sterling Marlin	Morgan–McClure Motorsports	Chevrolet
4	6	Mark Martin	Roush Racing	Ford
5	16	Ted Musgrave	Roush Racing	Ford
6	2	Rusty Wallace	Penske Racing South	Ford
7	5	Terry Labonte	Hendrick Motorsports	Chevrolet
8	18	Bobby Labonte	Joe Gibbs Racing	Chevrolet
9	30	Michael Waltrip	Bahari Racing	Pontiac
10	21	Morgan Shepherd	Wood Brothers Racing	Ford
11	94	Bill Elliott	Elliott-Hardy Racing	Ford
12	43	Bobby Hamilton	Petty Enterprises	Pontiac
13	10	Ricky Rudd	Rudd Performance Motorsports	Ford
14	28	Dale Jarrett	Robert Yates Racing	Ford
15	25	Ken Schrader	Hendrick Motorsports	Chevrolet
16	12	Derrike Cope	Bobby Allison Motorsports	Ford
17	7	Geoff Bodine	Geoff Bodine Racing	Ford
18	1	Rick Mast	Precision Products Racing	Ford
19	37	John Andretti	Kranefuss-Haas Racing	Ford
20	17	Darrell Waltrip	Darrell Waltrip Motorsports	Chevrolet
21	11	Brett Bodine	Junior Johnson & Associates	Ford
22	9	Lake Speed	Melling Racing	Ford
23	29	Steve Grissom	Diamond Ridge Motorsports	Chevrolet
24	41	Ricky Craven (R)	Larry Hedrick Motorsports	Chevrolet
25	15	Dick Trickle	Bud Moore Engineering	Ford
26	33	Robert Pressley (R)	Leo Jackson Motorsports	Chevrolet
27	23	Jimmy Spencer	Travis Carter Enterprises	Ford
28	42	Kyle Petty	Team SABCO	Pontiac
29	87	Joe Nemechek	NEMCO Motorsports	Chevrolet
30	8	Jeff Burton	Stavola Brothers Racing	Ford
Provisionals
31	27	Elton Sawyer	Junior Johnson & Associates	Ford
32	22	Ward Burton	Bill Davis Racing	Pontiac
33	98	Jeremy Mayfield	Cale Yarborough Motorsports	Ford
34	75	Todd Bodine	Butch Mock Motorsports	Ford
35	26	Hut Stricklin	King Racing	Ford
36	90	Mike Wallace	Donlavey Racing	Ford
Failed to qualify
37	31	Jimmy Hensley	A.G. Dillard Motorsports	Chevrolet
38	32	Greg Sacks	Active Motorsports	Chevrolet
39	40	Rich Bickle	Dick Brooks Racing	Pontiac
40	71	Dave Marcis	Marcis Auto Racing	Chevrolet
41	77	Bobby Hillin Jr.	Jasper Motorsports	Ford
42	81	Kenny Wallace	FILMAR Racing	Ford
Official starting lineup

== Race results ==
Fin	St	#	Driver	Team	Make	Laps	Led	Status	Pts	Winnings
1	2	3	Dale Earnhardt	Richard Childress Racing	Chevrolet	500	253	running	185	$78,150
2	7	5	Terry Labonte	Hendrick Motorsports	Chevrolet	500	164	running	175	$45,600
3	6	2	Rusty Wallace	Penske Racing South	Ford	500	53	running	170	$42,400
4	12	43	Bobby Hamilton	Petty Enterprises	Pontiac	500	0	running	160	$24,450
5	17	7	Geoff Bodine	Geoff Bodine Racing	Ford	500	0	running	155	$32,100
6	11	94	Bill Elliott	Elliott-Hardy Racing	Ford	500	0	running	150	$17,600
7	1	24	Jeff Gordon	Hendrick Motorsports	Chevrolet	500	3	running	151	$25,150
8	20	17	Darrell Waltrip	Darrell Waltrip Motorsports	Chevrolet	500	0	running	142	$21,050
9	16	12	Derrike Cope	Bobby Allison Motorsports	Ford	500	0	running	138	$15,350
10	14	28	Dale Jarrett	Robert Yates Racing	Ford	500	11	running	139	$27,050
11	28	42	Kyle Petty	Team SABCO	Pontiac	500	0	running	130	$18,685
12	4	6	Mark Martin	Roush Racing	Ford	499	0	running	127	$22,900
13	19	37	John Andretti	Kranefuss-Haas Racing	Ford	499	0	running	124	$12,900
14	8	18	Bobby Labonte	Joe Gibbs Racing	Chevrolet	499	0	running	121	$21,600
15	25	15	Dick Trickle	Bud Moore Engineering	Ford	498	0	running	118	$18,700
16	33	98	Jeremy Mayfield	Cale Yarborough Motorsports	Ford	497	0	running	115	$12,400
17	36	90	Mike Wallace	Donlavey Racing	Ford	497	0	running	112	$14,100
18	27	23	Jimmy Spencer	Travis Carter Enterprises	Ford	496	0	running	109	$11,605
19	10	21	Morgan Shepherd	Wood Brothers Racing	Ford	494	0	running	106	$15,950
20	22	9	Lake Speed	Melling Racing	Ford	494	0	running	103	$12,500
21	32	22	Ward Burton	Bill Davis Racing	Pontiac	494	0	running	100	$15,550
22	21	11	Brett Bodine	Junior Johnson & Associates	Ford	491	0	running	97	$20,050
23	3	4	Sterling Marlin	Morgan–McClure Motorsports	Chevrolet	484	0	brakes	94	$21,000
24	34	75	Todd Bodine	Butch Mock Motorsports	Ford	479	0	running	91	$15,250
25	9	30	Michael Waltrip	Bahari Racing	Pontiac	475	1	running	93	$15,250
26	23	29	Steve Grissom	Diamond Ridge Motorsports	Chevrolet	458	13	running	90	$9,850
27	13	10	Ricky Rudd	Rudd Performance Motorsports	Ford	450	0	running	82	$19,700
28	18	1	Rick Mast	Precision Products Racing	Ford	450	0	running	79	$14,600
29	5	16	Ted Musgrave	Roush Racing	Ford	434	0	running	76	$14,500
30	29	87	Joe Nemechek	NEMCO Motorsports	Chevrolet	429	0	running	73	$8,950
31	30	8	Jeff Burton	Stavola Brothers Racing	Ford	401	0	crash	70	$11,450
32	15	25	Ken Schrader	Hendrick Motorsports	Chevrolet	386	0	running	67	$11,450
33	31	27	Elton Sawyer	Junior Johnson & Associates	Ford	378	0	rear end	64	$11,450
34	26	33	Robert Pressley (R)	Leo Jackson Motorsports	Chevrolet	368	0	crash	61	$13,050
35	24	41	Ricky Craven (R)	Larry Hedrick Motorsports	Chevrolet	324	2	engine	63	$6,950
36	35	26	Hut Stricklin	King Racing	Ford	202	0	brakes	55	$11,450
Official race results

Previous race: 1995 MBNA 500	NASCAR Winston Cup Series; 1995 season	Next race: 1995 Tyson Holly Farms 400
