= Eric Smith (racing driver) =

American racing driver

- Born: May 6, 1967 (age 59); Bloomington, Illinois, U.S.

ARCA Menards Series career
- 123 races run over 20 years
- Best finish: 11th (1994)
- First race: 1983 DuQuoin 100 (DuQuoin)
- Last race: 2002 Federated Auto Parts 100 (DuQuoin)
- First win: 1995 Engineered Components 200 (Owosso)
- Last win: 1995 Kil-Kare ARCA 150 (Kil-Kare)
Wins	Top tens	Poles
2	48	2
- Statistics up to date as of December 17, 2024.

Eric Smith (born May 6, 1967) is an American former professional stock car racing driver who has previously competed in the ARCA Re/Max Series from 1983 to 2003.

Smith has also previously competed in series such as the USAC Stock Car Series, the World of Outlaws Late Model Series, the UMP DIRTcar Summer Nationals, and the Monster Midwest Series.

== Motorsports results ==
=== ARCA Re/Max Series ===
(key) (Bold – Pole position awarded by qualifying time. Italics – Pole position earned by points standings or practice time. * – Most laps led. ** – All laps led.)

ARCA Re/Max Series results
Year	Team	No.	Make	1	2	3	4	5	6	7	8	9	10	11	12	13	14	15	16	17	18	19	20	21	22	23	24	25	ARMSC	Pts	Ref
1983	Smith Racing	53	Ford	DAY	NSV	TAL	LPR	LPR	ISF	IRP	SSP	FRS	BFS	WIN	LPR	POC	TAL	MCS	FRS	MIL	DSF; 28	ZAN	SND						N/A	0	
1984	Smith Racing	51	Ford	DAY	ATL	TAL	CSP	SMS	FRS	MCS	LCS	IRP; 21	TAL	FRS	ISF; DNQ	DSF	TOL	MGR											N/A	0	
1985	N/A	61	Ford	ATL	DAY	ATL	TAL	ATL	SSP	IRP	CSP	FRS	IRP	OEF	ISF; 32	DSF	TOL												N/A	0	
1987	Southtown Motorsports	9	Ford	DAY	ATL	TAL	DEL	ACS	TOL	ROC	POC	FRS	KIL	TAL	FRS	ISF; 25	INF; 28	DSF; 16	SLM; 15	ATL									N/A	0	
1988	Southtown Motorsports	9	Ford	DAY	ATL	TAL	FRS; 14	PCS; 11	ROC; 19	POC	WIN; 20	KIL; 18	ACS; 12	SLM; 17	POC	TAL	DEL; 25	FRS; 23	ISF; 27	DSF; 28	SLM; 11	ATL							N/A	0	
1989	Southtown Motorsports	9	Ford	DAY	ATL	KIL	TAL	FRS	POC	KIL	HAG	POC	TAL	DEL	FRS	ISF; DNQ	TOL	DSF; DNQ	SLM; 13	ATL									N/A	0	
1990	Southtown Motorsports	9	Ford	DAY	ATL	KIL; 14	TAL	FRS; 23	POC	KIL; 19	TOL; 16	HAG	POC	TAL	MCH	ISF; 9	TOL	DSF; 26	WIN	DEL	ATL								N/A	0	
1991	Southtown Motorsports	9	Ford	DAY	ATL	KIL	TAL	TOL	FRS	POC	MCH	KIL	FRS	DEL	POC	TAL	HPT	MCH	ISF; 24	TOL	DSF; 12	TWS	ATL						N/A	0	
1992	Southtown Motorsports	9	Ford	DAY	FIF	TWS	TAL	TOL; 8	KIL	POC	MCH	FRS; 24	KIL	NSH; 10	DEL; 8	POC	HPT; 19	FRS	ISF; 10	TOL; 17	DSF; 39	TWS	SLM; 21	ATL					22nd	1445	
1993	Southtown Motorsports	9	Ford	DAY	FIF; 8	TWS	TAL	KIL	CMS	FRS; 12	TOL; 10	POC	MCH; 33	FRS; 7	POC; 34	KIL; 8	ISF; 14	DSF; 27	TOL; 25	SLM; 12	WIN; 7	ATL							14th	2145	
1994	Southtown Motorsports	9	Ford	DAY	TAL	FIF; 4	LVL; 21	KIL; 11	TOL; 9	FRS; 10	MCH	DMS; 6	POC	POC	KIL; 4	FRS; 7	INF; 12	I70; 9	ISF; 11	DSF; 8	TOL; 12	SLM; 14	WIN; 12	ATL					11th	3295	
1995	Southtown Motorsports	9	Ford	DAY	ATL	TAL	FIF	KIL; 2	FRS; 20	MCH	I80; 7	MCS; 1	FRS; 10	POC	POC	KIL; 1*	FRS; 18	SBS; 4	LVL; 19	ISF; 33	DSF; 34	SLM; 4	WIN; 28	ATL					14th	2500	
1996	Southtown Motorsports	09	Ford	DAY	ATL	SLM; 25	TAL	FIF	LVL	CLT	CLT																		15th	1750	
1996	Southtown Motorsports	9	Ford									**KIL**; 7	FRS; 8	POC	MCH	FRS; 16	TOL; 23	POC	MCH	INF; 5	SBS; 15	ISF; 9	DSF; 24	KIL; 7	SLM; 16	WIN	CLT	ATL	15th	1750	
1997	Southtown Motorsports	9	Ford	DAY	ATL	SLM; 16	CLT	CLT	POC	MCH	SBS; 23	TOL; 10	KIL; 4	FRS; 7	MIN; 24	POC	MCH	DSF; 4	GTW	SLM; 7	WIN; 6	CLT	TAL	ISF; 31	ATL				17th	1735	
1998	Southtown Motorsports	9	Ford	DAY	ATL	SLM; 6	CLT	MEM; 28	MCH	POC	SBS; 25	TOL; 20	PPR	POC	**KIL**; 2	FRS; 26	ISF; 27	ATL	DSF; 6	SLM; 30	TEX	WIN; 22	CLT	TAL	ATL				N/A	0	
1999	Southtown Motorsports	9	Ford	DAY	ATL	SLM	AND; DNQ	CLT	MCH	POC	TOL; 20	SBS; 10	BLN; 27	POC	KIL; 2	FRS; 21	FLM	ISF; 7	WIN	DSF; 13	SLM; 7	CLT	TAL	ATL					25th	1385	
2000	Southtown Motorsports	9	Ford	DAY	SLM	AND	CLT	KIL; 3	FRS; 3	MCH	POC	TOL; 9	KEN	BLN; 6	POC	WIN	ISF; 31	KEN	DSF; 30	SLM	CLT	TAL	ATL						33rd	1015	
2001	Southtown Motorsports	9	Ford	DAY	NSH	WIN	SLM	GTY	KEN	CLT	KAN	MCH	POC	MEM	GLN	KEN	MCH	POC	NSH	ISF; 7	CHI	DSF; 19	SLM	TOL	BLN	CLT	TAL	ATL	89th	330	
2002	Southtown Motorsports	9	Ford	DAY	ATL	NSH	SLM	KEN	CLT	KAN	POC	MCH	TOL	SBO	KEN	BLN	POC	NSH	ISF; 13	WIN	DSF; 30	CHI	SLM	TAL	CLT				105th	245	
2003	Southtown Motorsports	9	Ford	DAY	ATL	NSH	SLM	TOL	KEN	CLT	BLN	KAN	MCH	LER	POC	POC	NSH	ISF; DNQ	WIN	DSF	CHI	SLM	TAL	CLT	SBO				N/A	0	
