= Kenny Wallace =

American racing driver (born 1963)

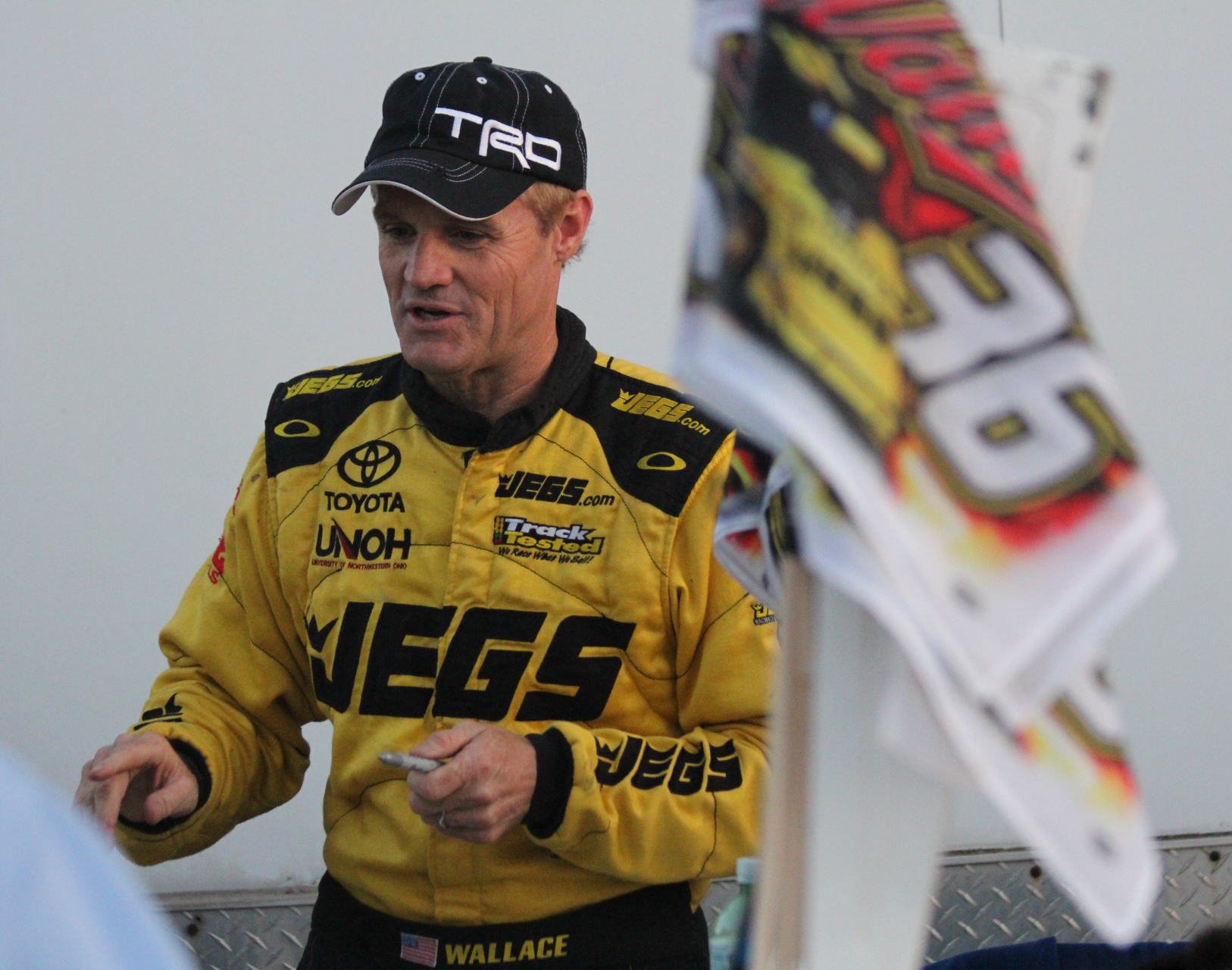
- Wallace signing autographs in 2014
- Born: August 23, 1963 (age 63); St. Louis, Missouri, U.S.
- Achievements: 2012 DIRTcar Summit Racing Equipment Modified Nationals Champion; 2021 Wild Card 25 Winner; 2005 Prelude to the Dream Winner; 2018 IWK 250 Winner
- Awards: 1986 American Speed Association Rookie of the Year; 1989 NASCAR Busch Series Rookie of the Year; 1991, 1994, 2006 NASCAR Busch Series Most Popular Driver; Missouri Sports Hall of Fame (2023)

NASCAR Cup Series career
- 344 races run over 18 years
- 2008 position: 61st
- Best finish: 22nd (1999)
- First race: 1990 First Union 400 (North Wilkesboro)
- Last race: 2008 AMP Energy 500 (Talladega)
Wins	Top tens	Poles
0	27	3

NASCAR O'Reilly Auto Parts Series career
- 547 races run over 26 years
- 2015 position: 51st
- Best finish: 2nd (1991)
- First race: 1988 Advance Auto 150 (Martinsville)
- Last race: 2015 U.S. Cellular 250 (Iowa)
- First win: 1991 Spring 200 (Volusia County)
- Last win: 2001 Sam's Club 200 (Rockingham)
Wins	Top tens	Poles
9	173	10

NASCAR FedEx Freight Truck Series career
- 13 races run over 5 years
- 2013 position: 99th
- Best finish: 34th (1996)
- First race: 1995 Goody's 150 (Martinsville)
- Last race: 2013 EnjoyIllinois.com 225 (Joliet)
Wins	Top tens	Poles
0	4	0

NASCAR Canada Series career
- 1 race run over 1 year
- Best finish: 62nd (2003)
- First race: 2003 Canada Day Shootout (Cayuga)
Wins	Top tens	Poles
0	0	0
- Statistics up to date as of August 1, 2015.

Kenneth Lee Wallace (born August 23, 1963) is an American race car driver and former reporter for Fox NASCAR. He retired from NASCAR in 2015 after driving in the national series since 1988. In a career spanning 25 years in NASCAR, Wallace had nine wins, all occurring in the NASCAR O'Reilly Auto Parts Series. Now retired from NASCAR competition, he continues to race on local dirt tracks across the country as a hobby.

== Early life ==
Wallace is the youngest of three brothers Rusty and Mike, born to Russ and Judy Wallace. Russ was a prolific race winner himself, which made him unpopular with fans. Wallace earned his nickname, "Herman," early in life when Lake Hill Speedway promoter Bob Mueller made note of Wallace's boisterous behavior when taking up for his father, likening him to the mischievous cartoon character Herman the German. Wallace who was hyperactive as a child has been diagnosed with ADHD. He went to Fox High School in Arnold, Missouri.

== Motorsports career ==
Wallace began his racing career by working as a mechanic on his father's race cars and brother's team. He entered his first race, the Illinois Street Stock State Championship, in 1982, winning the event. In 1984, Wallace worked as a mechanic for Benfield Racing and Joe Ruttman, eventually being promoted to crew chief after Jake Elder left the team. He would continue to work as crew chief until the late 1980s before transitioning to a full time driver. Wallace later commented on his struggle going from a mechanic to driver stating:

Going from a mechanic to a race car driver was pretty difficult, I ended up calling a man named John Childs, who owned some tire stores in the O'Fallon area. John helped me financially and so did our motor man, Don Kirn. Racing cars is super expensive, and I could have never done it by myself.

Wallace entered the American Speed Association in 1986, achieving Rookie of the Year honors in the series after finishing 11th in the standings with seven top-tens. During the 1987 seasons he finished in tenth once again securing seven top-tens, he raced his final full year in the ASA in 1988 where he finished 7th with ten top-tens.

=== Early Busch career ===
In September 1988, Dale Earnhardt gave Wallace the seat for his first-ever NASCAR start, in which he finished eleventh in the Busch Series race at Martinsville Speedway, driving the No. 8 GM Goodwrench Chevrolet. The following year, he raced the full Busch Series schedule in a car owned by brother Rusty Wallace, sponsored by Cox Treated Lumber earning the 1989 Rookie of the Year award and finishing sixth in driver point standings with sixteen top-tens and three poles. In 1990, he made his Winston Cup debut at North Wilkesboro Speedway in the No. 36 Pontiac for Randy Cox, finishing 26th after a late-race crash, setting up the controversial finish, which saw Brett Bodine win. He finished seventh in the Busch Series, finishing the year with fourteen top-tens and one pole win. The following season, he won his first two career races at Volusia County and New Hampshire, and finished a career-best second in the Busch points behind champion Bobby Labonte. He also subbed for Kyle Petty in two races in the Cup series at Charlotte and Dover. At the Pyroil 500, he competed against his brothers Mike and Rusty, marking the first time since Bob, Fonty, and Tim Flock raced that three brothers competed in the same race. In 1992, Dirt Devil became his sponsor and he won his third career Busch race at Martinsville, but several mechanical problems dropped him down to sixth in points.

=== 1993–2000 ===
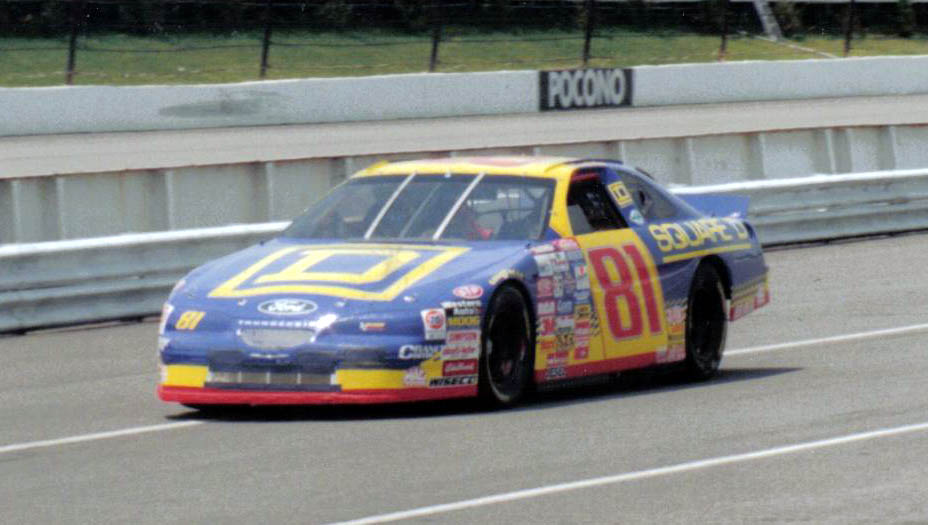
Wallace driving for FILMAR Racing at Pocono Raceway in 1997.

In 1993, Wallace moved up to the Winston Cup Series full-time, driving the No. 40 Dirt Devil Pontiac Grand Prix for SABCO Racing. The team got a considerable amount of television time as the team was featured on the TV show What Would You Do?. He had three top-tens and finished 23rd in points, but lost his ride at the end of the season. He returned to the Busch Series to drive the No. 8 TIC Financial Systems Ford for FILMAR Racing. He earned three wins at Bristol, Richmond and Martinsville he finished fourth in points. Towards the end of the season, he was hired by Robert Yates Racing to replace an injured Ernie Irvan in the Cup series. In twelve races, he finished in the top-ten three times. In 1995, Wallace and FILMAR split time between the Cup and Busch Series. Wallace had one win with the Red Dog Ford in the Busch Series at Richmond, and made eleven starts in the Cup Series in the No. 81 car.

Wallace and FILMAR began racing in Cup full-time 1996 with funding from Square D. They had two top-ten finishes and finished 28th in points. That year he also claimed one Busch Series win at Richmond. The following season, he won two poles, at Bristol and Martinsville respectively, but fell five spots in the standings. Despite seven top-tens in 1998, Wallace and Square D left FILMAR to drive Andy Petree Racing's new No. 55 entry. Wallace finished in the top-ten five times and had a career-best 22nd-place finish in points. After only one top-ten in 2000 and a 26th place finish in the points, he departed the team. The sole top-ten came in his second-place finish to Dale Earnhardt in the 2000 Winston 500, which was Earnhardt's 76th and final victory. Wallace pushed Earnhardt to the front in four laps to the lead.

=== 2001–2015 ===
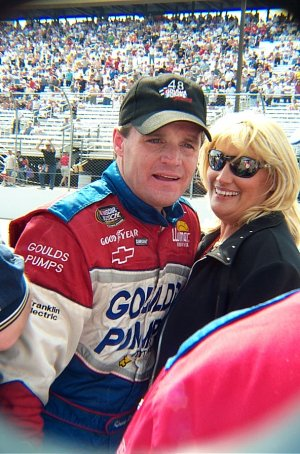
Wallace and his wife Kim in 2001

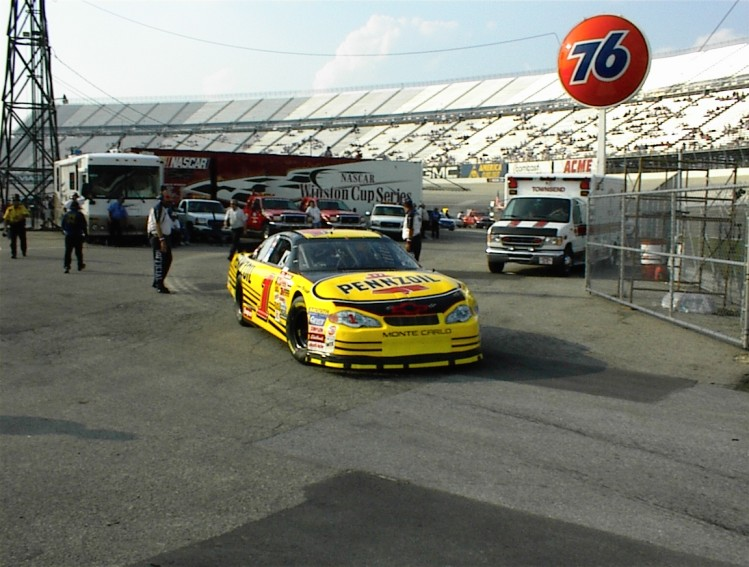
Wallace's 2001 Cup car, subbing for Steve Park

In 2001, Wallace signed with the unsponsored Eel River Racing team, and also was hired to drive the No. 48 Goulds Pumps Chevy in the Busch Series full-time for Innovative Motorsports. After several DNQ's, Wallace resigned from the team to concentrate on his Busch ride. He won his first race in seven years at North Carolina Speedway and finished 10th in points with seven top-fives and thirteen top-tens. He also filled in for Steve Park in the Cup Series, winning one pole and nailing down two top-tens, including a second place finish at Rockingham Speedway, tying a career best. He did not win in 2002, but moved up to seventh in the Busch series standings with thirteen top-tens in the No. 48 Chevrolet now sponsored by Stacker 2. He replaced Kevin Harvick in Richard Childress Racing's No. 29 car at Martinsville after the latter was suspended for deliberately wrecking another driver in the Truck Series race the day before. He was hired late in the season by Bill Davis Racing to replace Hut Stricklin in the No. 23 Hills Brothers Coffee Dodge, and was hired to drive the car full-time in 2003, bringing his Stacker 2 sponsorship with him while also driving a single race in the Busch Series for Michael Waltrip at Gateway, his hometown track in St. Louis. After one top-ten finish, Wallace and the team moved down to the Busch Series in 2004, garnering ten top-tens for a 10th place finish. He also drove in the Cup Series five times for Michael Waltrip Racing.

In 2005, Davis Racing closed its Busch team, allowing Wallace and sponsor Stacker 2 to join ppc Racing's No. 22 Ford, earning five top-fives and eleven top-tens. During that season Wallace's team lost sponsorship when Stacker 2 backed out of NASCAR, and drove for the rest of his time with ppc Racing driving the No. 22 AutoZone Ford. He finished the 2005 season in seventh with five top-fives and eleven top-tens. He began driving for Furniture Row Racing in the Cup Series that season, and ran seventeen races with them in 2006. After four top-tens in 2006, Furniture Row began racing full-time in Cup, so Wallace left ppc.

Despite getting voted into the All-Star Race at Charlotte, Wallace was unable to keep the No. 78 in the top-35 in owner's points, and left the team in August. On August 22, 2007, he filled in for Kyle Petty in the No. 45 Wells Fargo Dodge at Bristol. Shortly after that drove as a sub for an injured Ricky Rudd in the No. 88 Snickers Ford Fusion until Rudd returned.

Wallace attempted to qualify for the 2008 Daytona 500 in a second car for Furniture Row Racing—the No. 87 Denver Mattress Chevrolet. This car was entered as a safety net for the team's primary driver Joe Nemechek in the 78, should his car not make the race. Nemechek locked the 78 in on pole day, giving Wallace the opportunity to race. Wallace finished eighth in the first Duel at Daytona, making the 50th Daytona 500. Wallace was black flagged in the 500 for failure to maintain the NASCAR-required speed, allowing him to finished dead-last. Wallace drove for Armando Fitz early in the 2008 NASCAR Nationwide Series season before switching to the No. 28 for Jay Robinson. Between the 2008, 2009, and 2010 seasons, Wallace finished in the top-ten three times. He left Jay Robinson and joined RAB Racing, driving without a paycheck in exchange for getting to drive competitive equipment. Wallace recorded eleven top-ten finishes in 2011, with a best finish of fifth at Richmond, he finished seventh in the standings. In October, he announced that he would return to the team in 2012. However, Wallace only ran the first five races before sponsorship issues forced him to move to a partial schedule. In addition to driving both RAB's Nos. 09 and 99, Wallace also drove at Indianapolis with Benny Gordon's SR^{2} Motorsports team and finished nineteenth.

In January 2012, RAB Racing announced that Wallace would be attempting to qualify for the 2012 Daytona 500, driving the No. 09 American Ethanol Toyota Camry. The team suffered fuel pump issues in the Gatorade Duel and failed to qualify for the race.

In July 2012, Wallace was guaranteed a ride for one race in the No. 22 Penske Racing Nationwide car, but Sam Hornish Jr. was given the ride. In 2012, Wallace won the DIRTcar Summit Racing Equipment Modified Nationals Championship, a moment that he has called the highlight of his racing career. During the season, he won two races and secured seven top-fives and ten top-tens. In 2013 Wallace finished in fourth place with one win and nine top-tens.

In 2013, Wallace ran the inaugural Mudsummer Classic at Eldora Speedway and after winning the fourth heat race, he finished seventeenth after starting fourth in the event. He also ran at Chicagoland Speedway in the Truck Series, as well as running a limited schedule in the Nationwide Series for RAB Racing; at the Chicagoland Nationwide race, he made his nine-hundredth start in NASCAR's top three divisions. In late September, he qualified Brian Vickers' Sprint Cup Series car at New Hampshire Motor Speedway, due to a scheduling conflict; Vickers drove in the race and finished seventh.

In early 2015, Wallace competed in the Chili Bowl Midget Nationals for Loyet Motorsports. Also in 2015, Kenny's brother, Mike Wallace, had open heart surgery. Kenny was announced as his replacement in the Winn-Dixie 300 at Talladega, driving the No. 26 Xfinity Series Toyota for JGL Racing. Wallace was involved in a late-race accident and finished 38th. He joined RAB Racing for the Iowa race in June with the sponsorship from U.S. Cellular, finishing a respectable 23rd after starting from the rear of the field. He also announced that he would run his final NASCAR race at Iowa with Joe Gibbs Racing in August. He finished fifteenth in his final NASCAR start.

Wallace's 547 starts were the most in Xfinity Series history until Jeremy Clements surpassed him in 2026.

=== 2016–present ===
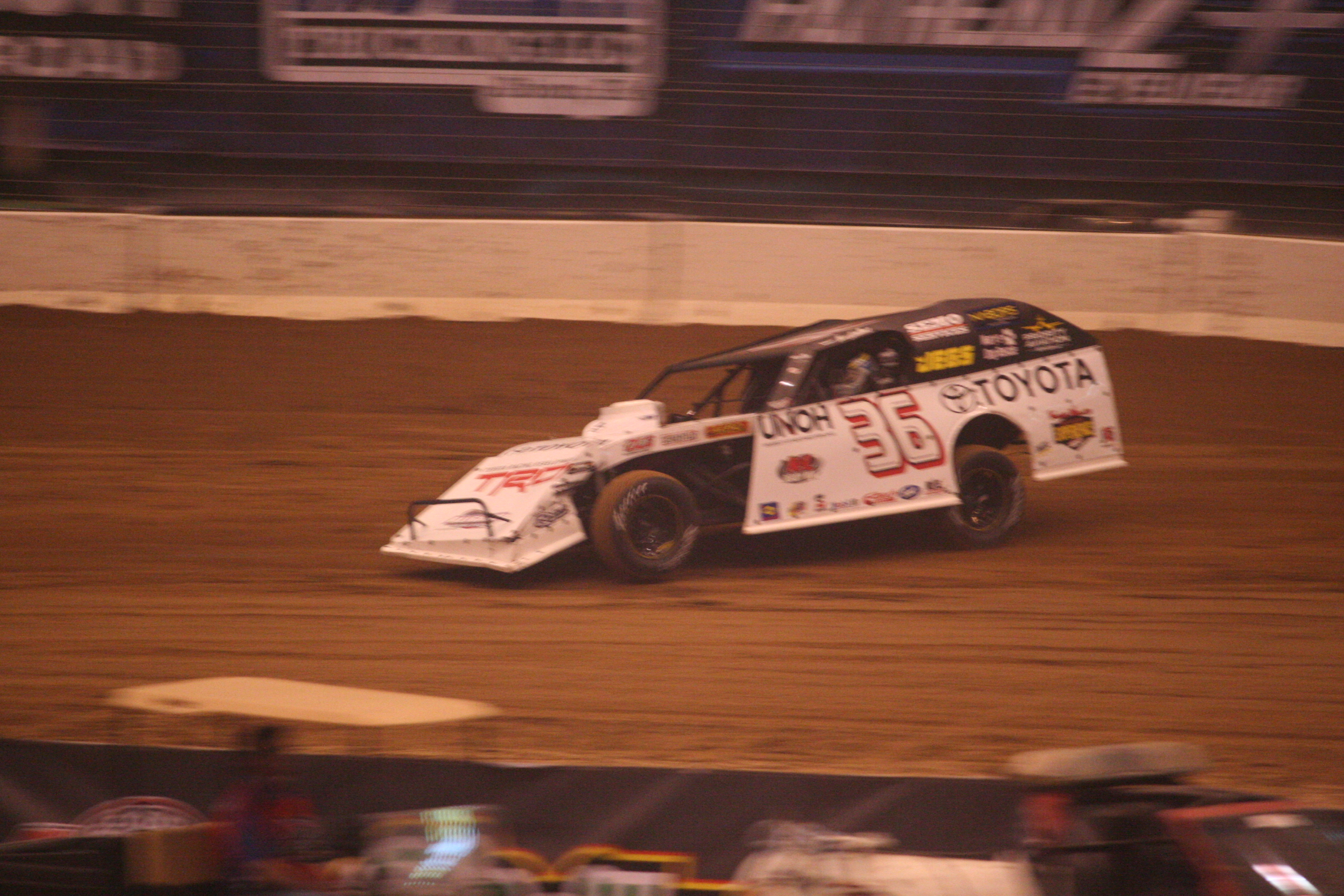
Wallace competing at the 2018 Gateway Dirt Nationals driving a dirt modified car

Though his NASCAR driving career came to an end, Wallace continues to race on dirt tracks in his UMPDirtCar modified. In August 2016, he ran the Stadium Super Trucks race at the Charlotte Dirt Track, driving the No. 36 Safecraft Safety Equipment truck. He finished eighth in the event. He went on to finish the season in second place behind Nick Hoffman. Wallace finished in fourth place back to back years in DIRTcar Summit Racing Equipment Modified Nationals in 2016 and 2017, winning one race each year with eight top-fives as well.

In 2018, Wallace won the prestigious IWK 250 after Cassius Clark, Dave O'Blenis, and J.R. Fitzpatrick were disqualified for illegal carburetors.

In 2022, Wallace announced that it would be his final year of full-time racing and would race around 50 times in the DIRTcar UMP Modified field and the DIRTcar Nationals. Wallace won back to back Missouri / Illinois regional championships in 2022 and 2023.

In 2025, Wallace won seven races, and had thirty top-fives. He also won his third Missouri / Illinois regional championship, his second I-55 Speedway championship and finished fifth in the DIRTcar UMP.

== Broadcasting and other ventures ==
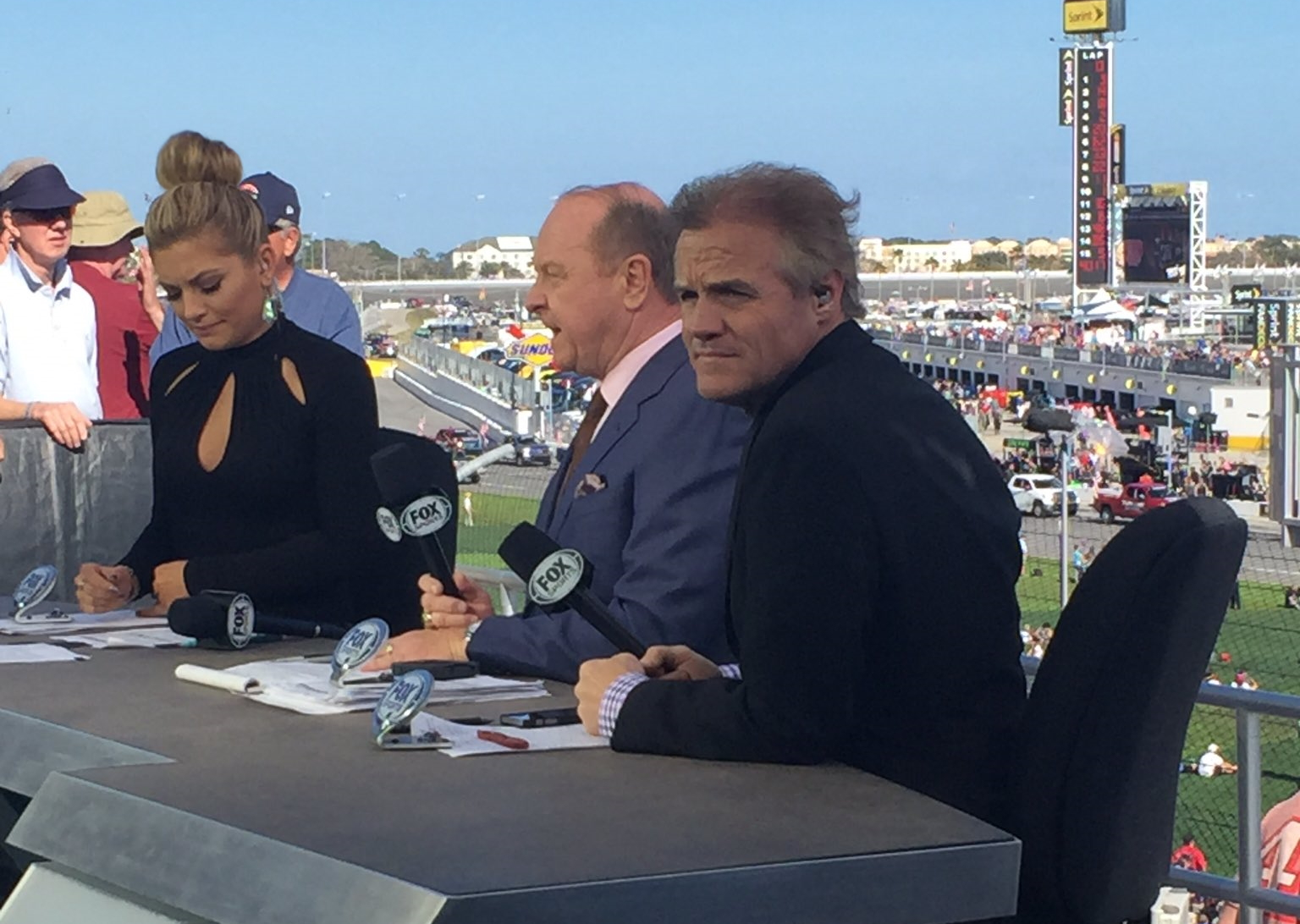
Wallace while working for Fox Sports at Daytona International Speedway in 2016

In 2005, as part of Speed Channel's NASCAR coverage, Wallace co-hosted the popular pre-race program NASCAR RaceDay alongside John Roberts, offering analysis and interviews ahead of races. In 2023 Wallace and Robert's reunited to cover several races during that years NASCAR cup series season.

Following his retirement from NASCAR in 2015 Wallace worked as a reporter for Fox Sports serving as a reporter during NASCAR events till 2017. He also occasionally served as a broadcaster for NASCAR Truck Series events. Wallace later explained why he left the job in 2023, claiming that he did not enjoy spending so much time in airports while traveling for the job.

From 2015 to 2017, Wallace worked for SiriusXM NASCAR Radio as co-host of The Late Shift alongside former NHL player Colton Parayko.

Wallace started a personal YouTube channel in 2021, where he talks about motorsports. As of 2026, he has amassed over 158 thousand subscribers. He is known for his expansive and comedic personality which he displays during videos.

Since 2024, Wallace has also co-hosted the Herm & Schrader podcast alongside Ken Schrader. Produced by Dirty Mo Media, the podcast cover spersonal racing stories and conducts interviews with active racers.

== Personal life ==
Wallace is a member of a large racing family. Wallace's father, Russ, was a prolific winner on Midwestern short tracks in the 1960s and 1970s. Kenny and his older brothers, Rusty Wallace and Mike Wallace, followed in their father's footsteps. Rusty is the 1989 NASCAR Winston Cup Series champion and winner of 55 Cup Series races. Mike is a winner of four Nationwide Series and five Camping World Truck Series races. Rusty's son, Steve Wallace, is a former Nationwide Series driver, and Mike's daughter, Chrissy Wallace, has participated in multiple Nationwide Series and Camping World Truck Series races.

Living outside of St. Louis, Missouri, Wallace is married to Kim and has three daughters, Brooke, Brandy, and Brittany. He became a grandfather on May 19, 2016. Wallace is a fan of the St. Louis Cardinals. He has also become a motivational speaker.

During his early Cup days, Wallace had a go-kart track in his backyard that hosted races for other Cup drivers. The track was eventually razed when Wallace didn't have insurance to cover injuries sustained at the track.

In 2023 Wallace was inducted into the Missouri Sports Hall of Fame, joining his brother Rusty who was inducted in 1998.

== Motorsports career results ==
=== NASCAR ===
(key) (Bold – Pole position awarded by qualifying time. Italics – Pole position earned by points standings or practice time. * – Most laps led.)

==== Cup Series ====
NASCAR Cup Series results
Year	Team	No.	Make	1	2	3	4	5	6	7	8	9	10	11	12	13	14	15	16	17	18	19	20	21	22	23	24	25	26	27	28	29	30	31	32	33	34	35	36	NSCC	Pts	Ref
1990	Randy Hope Motorsports	99	Pontiac	DAY	RCH	CAR	ATL; DNQ	DAR	BRI																															81st	85	
1990	Randy Hope Motorsports	36	Pontiac							NWS; 26	MAR	TAL	CLT	DOV	SON	POC	MCH	DAY	POC	TAL	GLN	MCH	BRI	DAR	RCH	DOV	MAR	NWS	CLT	CAR	PHO	ATL								81st	85	
1991	Team SABCO	42	Pontiac	DAY	RCH	CAR	ATL	DAR	BRI	NWS	MAR	TAL	CLT; 13	DOV; 26	SON	POC	MCH	DAY	POC	TAL	GLN	MCH	BRI	DAR																44th	412	
1991	Team III Racing	24	Pontiac																						RCH; 31	DOV	MAR	NWS	CLT	CAR	PHO; 43	ATL; 23								44th	412	
1992	Rusty Wallace Racing	24	Pontiac	DAY	CAR	RCH	ATL	DAR; DNQ	BRI	NWS	MAR	TAL	CLT	DOV	SON	POC	MCH	DAY	POC	TAL	GLN	MCH	BRI	DAR	RCH	DOV	MAR	NWS	CLT	CAR	PHO	ATL								NA	-	
1993	Team SABCO	40	Pontiac	DAY; 23	CAR; 23	RCH; 26	ATL; 16	DAR; 32	BRI; 13	NWS; 15	MAR; 24	TAL; 14	SON; 36	CLT; 23	DOV; 13	POC; 15	MCH; 29	DAY; 28	NHA; 21	POC; 23	TAL; 35	GLN; 9	MCH; 23	BRI; 9	DAR; 10	RCH; 32	DOV; 16	MAR; 15	NWS; 27	CLT; 35	CAR; 37	PHO; 17	ATL; 30							23rd	2893	
1994	FILMAR Racing	81	Ford	DAY	CAR	RCH	ATL	DAR	BRI	NWS	MAR	TAL	SON	CLT	DOV	POC	MCH; 19	DAY	NHA	POC																				40th	1413	
1994	Charles Hardy Racing	44	Ford																		TAL; 9	IND	GLN	MCH																40th	1413	
1994	Robert Yates Racing	28	Ford																						BRI; 13	DAR; 11	RCH; 32	DOV; 20	MAR; 4	NWS; 10	CLT; 14	CAR; 15	PHO; 18	ATL; 25						40th	1413	
1995	FILMAR Racing	81	Ford	DAY; DNQ	CAR; 20	RCH; DNQ	ATL; DNQ	DAR; DNQ	BRI	NWS; DNQ	MAR; 21	TAL; 36	SON	CLT; 31	DOV; 18	POC	MCH; 36	DAY; DNQ	NHA	POC; 37	TAL	IND; 36	GLN	MCH; 24	BRI; DNQ	DAR	RCH; 20	DOV	MAR; DNQ	NWS	CLT; DNQ	CAR	PHO; 26	ATL						42nd	878	
1996	FILMAR Racing	81	Ford	DAY; 21	CAR; 7	RCH; 15	ATL; 37	DAR; 17	BRI; 34	NWS; 18	MAR; 14	TAL; 14	SON; 27	CLT; 32	DOV; 20	POC; 37	MCH; 33	DAY; 38	NHA; 19	POC; 36	TAL; 20	IND; 33	GLN; 31	MCH; 37	BRI; 15	DAR; 13	RCH; 38	DOV; 20	MAR; 10	NWS; 15	CLT; 30	CAR; 19	PHO; 37	ATL; DNQ						28th	2694	
1997	FILMAR Racing	81	Ford	DAY; 22	CAR; 41	RCH; 40	ATL; 29	DAR; 14	TEX; 13	BRI; 41	**MAR**; 6	SON; 36	TAL; 26	CLT; 39	DOV; 27	POC; 34	MCH; 43	CAL; DNQ	DAY; 11	NHA; 19	POC; 34	IND; 30	GLN; 27	MCH; 32	**BRI**; 39	DAR; 24	RCH; 24	NHA; 27	DOV; 38	MAR; 6	CLT; 28	TAL; 15	CAR; 37	PHO; 35	ATL; 30					33rd	2462	
1998	FILMAR Racing	81	Ford	DAY; DNQ	CAR; 38	LVS; 42	ATL; 7	DAR; 9	BRI; 42	TEX; 34	MAR; 22	TAL; 7	CAL; 19	CLT; 25	DOV; 40	RCH; 23	MCH; 39	POC; 39	SON; 22	NHA; 10	POC; 35	IND; 43	GLN; 26	MCH; DNQ	BRI; 42	NHA; 6	DAR; 10	RCH; 11	DOV; 43	MAR; 43	CLT; 16	TAL; 40	DAY; 35	PHO; 8	CAR; 16	ATL; 34				31st	2615	
1999	Andy Petree Racing	55	Chevy	DAY; 42	CAR; 13	LVS; 40	ATL; 29	DAR; 23	TEX; 39	BRI; 16	MAR; 6	TAL; 7	CAL; 27	RCH; 41	CLT; 12	DOV; 39	MCH; 21	POC; 25	SON; 14	DAY; 15	NHA; 2	POC; 37	IND; 39	GLN; 19	MCH; 27	BRI; 11	DAR; 35	RCH; 12	NHA; 34	DOV; 43	MAR; 5	CLT; 30	TAL; 5	CAR; 16	PHO; 18	HOM; 15	ATL; 34			22nd	3210	
2000	Andy Petree Racing	55	Chevy	DAY; 29	CAR; 24	LVS; 39	ATL; 37	DAR; 35	BRI; 20	TEX; 21	MAR; 42	TAL; 40	CAL; 36	RCH; 20	CLT; 27	DOV; 18	MCH; 31	POC; 23	SON; 13	DAY; 19	NHA; 26	POC; 21	IND; 29	GLN; 14	MCH; 30	BRI; 26	DAR; 35	RCH; 14	NHA; 43	DOV; 15	MAR; 22	CLT; 37	TAL; 2	CAR; 43	PHO; 19	HOM; 24	ATL; 23			26th	2874	
2001	Eel River Racing	27	Pontiac	DAY; 25	CAR; 42	LVS; 31	ATL; 29	DAR; 31	BRI; 38	TEX; 25	MAR; 37	TAL; DNQ	CAL; 37	RCH; 40	CLT; 40	DOV; 27	MCH; DNQ	POC; DNQ	SON; DNQ	DAY	CHI	NHA	POC	IND	GLN	MCH	BRI													39th	2054	
2001	Dale Earnhardt, Inc.	1	Chevy																									DAR; 41	RCH; 21	DOV; 22	KAN; 17	CLT; 23	MAR; 20	TAL; 6	PHO; 11	**CAR**; 2	HOM; 14	ATL; 28	NHA; 25	39th	2054	
2002	Dale Earnhardt, Inc.	1	Chevy	DAY; 30	CAR; 10	LVS; 27	ATL; 22	DAR	BRI	TEX																														39th	1868	
2002	Richard Childress Racing	29	Chevy								MAR; 32																													39th	1868	
2002	Michael Waltrip Racing	98	Chevy									TAL; 21	CAL	RCH	CLT	DOV	POC	MCH	SON																					39th	1868	
2002	Innovative Motorsports	98	Chevy																	DAY; 42	CHI; 29	NHA	POC	IND; 32	GLN; 36	MCH	BRI													39th	1868	
2002	Bill Davis Racing	23	Dodge																									DAR; 25	RCH; 14	NHA; 18	DOV; 27	KAN; 16		CLT; 25	MAR	ATL; 36	CAR; 13	PHO; 11	HOM; 23	39th	1868	
2002	Andy Petree Racing	33	Chevy																														TAL; 33							39th	1868	
2003	Bill Davis Racing	23	Dodge	DAY; 16	CAR; 38	LVS; 30	ATL; 26	DAR; 23	BRI; 10	TEX; 23	TAL; 17	MAR; 12	CAL; 22	RCH; 29	CLT; 42	DOV; 23	POC; 29	MCH; 25	SON; 29	DAY; 15	CHI; 24	NHA; 38	POC; 32	IND; 24	GLN; 34	MCH; 42	BRI; 15	DAR; 24	RCH; 23	NHA; 36	DOV; 28	TAL; 20	KAN; 31	CLT; 32	MAR; 16	ATL; 30	PHO; 25	CAR; 31	HOM; 22	30th	3061	
2004	Michael Waltrip Racing	00	Chevy	DAY	CAR	LVS	ATL	DAR	BRI	TEX	MAR	TAL; 37	CAL	RCH	CLT	DOV	POC	MCH	SON	DAY; DNQ	CHI	NHA	POC	IND; 34	GLN	MCH; DNQ	BRI; 25	CAL	RCH	NHA	DOV			CLT; DNQ	MAR	ATL; DNQ	PHO	DAR	HOM; 22	50th	365	
2004	Dale Earnhardt, Inc.	1	Chevy																													TAL; 32	KAN							50th	365	
2005	Michael Waltrip Racing	00	Chevy	DAY; 40	CAL	LVS	ATL	BRI	MAR	TEX	PHO	TAL; DNQ	DAR; 27	RCH	CLT	DOV	POC	MCH	SON					IND; DNQ	GLN	MCH	BRI	CAL	RCH	NHA										52nd	376	
2005	Bill Davis Racing	00	Dodge																	DAY; DNQ																				52nd	376	
2005	Front Row Motorsports	92	Chevy																		CHI; DNQ	NHA	POC																	52nd	376	
2005	Furniture Row Racing	78	Chevy																												DOV; 34	TAL	KAN	CLT	MAR	ATL	TEX			52nd	376	
2005	Roush Racing	97	Ford																																			PHO; 16	HOM; 21	52nd	376	
2006	Furniture Row Racing	78	Chevy	DAY; DNQ	CAL; 41	LVS; 38	ATL; DNQ	BRI; DNQ	MAR; DNQ	TEX; DNQ	PHO; 25	TAL; DNQ	RCH; 25	DAR; DNQ	CLT; 29	DOV; 38	POC	MCH	SON	DAY; DNQ	CHI; 38	NHA; 42	POC	IND; 32	GLN	MCH; DNQ	BRI; 30	CAL; 39	RCH; 37	NHA; DNQ	DOV; DNQ	KAN; 31	TAL; 42	CLT; DNQ	MAR; 29	ATL; 35	TEX; 30	PHO; DNQ	HOM; DNQ	43rd	984	
2007	Furniture Row Racing	78	Chevy	DAY; DNQ	CAL; DNQ	LVS; 24	ATL; DNQ	BRI; 21	MAR; DNQ	TEX; 42	PHO; 40	TAL; 26	RCH; 39	DAR; 24	CLT; 34	DOV; DNQ	POC; DNQ	MCH; DNQ	SON; DNQ	NHA; DNQ	DAY; 25	CHI; DNQ	IND; DNQ	POC; DNQ	GLN; 31	MCH														46th	1066	
2007	Petty Enterprises	45	Dodge																								BRI; 32	CAL												46th	1066	
2007	Robert Yates Racing	88	Ford																										RCH; 28	NHA; 34	DOV; 23	KAN; 40	TAL	CLT	MAR	ATL	TEX	PHO	HOM	46th	1066	
2008	Furniture Row Racing	87	Chevy	DAY; 43	CAL	LVS	ATL	BRI	MAR	TEX	PHO	TAL	RCH	DAR	CLT	DOV	POC	MCH	SON	NHA	DAY	CHI	IND	POC	GLN	MCH	BRI	CAL	RCH	NHA	DOV	KAN								61st	166	
2008	Michael Waltrip Racing	00	Toyota																														TAL; 12	CLT	MAR	ATL	TEX	PHO	HOM	61st	166	
2012	RAB Racing	09	Toyota	DAY; DNQ	PHO	LVS	BRI	CAL	MAR	TEX	KAN	RCH	TAL	DAR	CLT	DOV	POC	MCH	SON	KEN	DAY	NHA	IND	POC	GLN	MCH	BRI	ATL	RCH	CHI	NHA	DOV	TAL	CLT	KAN	MAR	TEX	PHO	HOM	75th	0^{1}	
2013	Michael Waltrip Racing	55	Toyota	DAY	PHO	LVS	BRI	CAL	MAR	TEX	KAN	RCH	TAL	DAR	CLT	DOV	POC	MCH	SON	KEN	DAY	NHA	IND	POC	GLN	MCH	BRI	ATL	RCH	CHI	NHA; QL^{†}	DOV	KAN	CLT	TAL	MAR	TEX	PHO	HOM	NA	-	
^{†} - Qualified for Brian Vickers

===== Daytona 500 =====
Year	Team	Manufacturer	Start	Finish
1993	Team SABCO	Pontiac	24	23
1995	FILMAR Racing	Ford	DNQ	
1996	FILMAR Racing	Ford	33	21
1997	FILMAR Racing	Ford	36	22
1998	FILMAR Racing	Ford	DNQ	
1999	Andy Petree Racing	Chevrolet	33	42
2000	Andy Petree Racing	Chevrolet	39	29
2001	Eel River Racing	Pontiac	23	25
2002	Dale Earnhardt, Inc.	Chevrolet	18	30
2003	Bill Davis Racing	Dodge	21	16
2005	Michael Waltrip Racing	Chevrolet	21	40
2006	Furniture Row Racing	Chevrolet	DNQ	
2007	Furniture Row Racing	Chevrolet	DNQ	
2008	Furniture Row Racing	Chevrolet	17	43
2012	RAB Racing	Toyota	DNQ	

==== Xfinity Series ====
NASCAR Xfinity Series results
Year	Team	No.	Make	1	2	3	4	5	6	7	8	9	10	11	12	13	14	15	16	17	18	19	20	21	22	23	24	25	26	27	28	29	30	31	32	33	34	35	NXSC	Pts	Ref
1988	Dale Earnhardt, Inc.	8	Chevy	DAY	HCY	CAR	MAR	DAR	BRI	LNG	NZH	SBO	NSV	CLT	DOV	ROU	LAN	LVL	MYB	OXF	SBO	HCY	LNG	IRP	ROU	BRI	DAR	RCH	DOV	MAR; 11	CLT	CAR	MAR						74th	130	
1989	Rusty Wallace Racing	36	Pontiac	**DAY**; 10	CAR; 24	MAR; 7	HCY; 8	DAR; 29	BRI; 5	NZH; 15	SBO; 6	LAN; 13	**NSV**; 3*	CLT; 12	DOV; 7	ROU; 4	**LVL**; 7	VOL; 8	MYB; 20	SBO; 9	HCY; 9	DUB; 9	IRP; 13	ROU; 11	BRI; 9	DAR; 22	RCH; 3	DOV; 27	MAR; 19	CLT; 8	CAR; 21	MAR; 12							6th	3750	
1990	Rusty Wallace Racing	36	Pontiac	DAY; 25	RCH; 5	CAR; 3	MAR; 29	HCY; 6	**DAR**; 8	BRI; 19	LAN; 2	SBO; 25	NZH; 7	HCY; 10	CLT; 9	DOV; 13	ROU; 27	VOL; 11	MYB; 3	OXF; 20	NHA; 24	SBO; 19	DUB; 9	IRP; 14	ROU; 14	BRI; 20	DAR; 9	RCH; 6	DOV; 8	MAR; 8	CLT; 11	NHA; 41	CAR; 14	MAR; 13*					7th	3829	
1991	Rusty Wallace Racing	36	Pontiac	DAY; 10	RCH; 3	CAR; 2	MAR; 3	VOL; 1*	HCY; 20	DAR; 13	BRI; 9	LAN; 19	SBO; 15	NZH; 3	CLT; 26	DOV; 18	ROU; 4	HCY; 12	MYB; 4	GLN; 14	OXF; 8	NHA; 1*	SBO; 2*	DUB; 2	IRP; 24	**ROU**; 7*	BRI; 6	DAR; 27	RCH; 15	DOV; 16	CLT; 7	NHA; 26	CAR; 3	MAR; 21					2nd	4190	
1992	Rusty Wallace Racing	36	Pontiac	DAY; 16		RCH; 2		MAR; 1*		BRI; 9	HCY; 24	LAN; 3	DUB; 8	NZH; 7			ROU; 4	MYB; 3	GLN; 6	VOL; 23	**NHA**; 23		IRP; 12	ROU; 21		NHA; 18	**BRI**; 7		RCH; 10			MAR; 22		HCY; 8					6th	3966	
1992	Rusty Wallace Racing	36	Chevy		CAR; 5		ATL; 12		DAR; 11						CLT; 25	DOV; 11						TAL; 26			MCH; 32			DAR; 18		DOV; 5	CLT; 18		CAR; 7						6th	3966	
1994	FILMAR Racing	8	Ford	DAY; 8	CAR; 23	RCH; 2	ATL; 21	MAR; 3	DAR; 4	HCY; 27	BRI; 20	ROU; 3*	NHA; 4	**NZH**; 8	CLT; 43	DOV; 38	MYB; 2	GLN; 25	MLW; 5	SBO; 23*	TAL; 24	HCY; 2	IRP; 8	MCH; 34	BRI; 1*	DAR; 21	RCH; 1*	DOV; 18	CLT; 15	MAR; 1	CAR; 6								4th	3554	
1995	FILMAR Racing	8	Ford	DAY; 4	CAR	RCH; 1*	ATL; 18	NSV; 4	DAR	BRI; 4	HCY	NHA	NZH	CLT; 40	DOV	MYB	GLN	MLW; 11	TAL; 3	SBO	IRP	MCH; 26	BRI; 30	DAR; 14	RCH; 8	DOV	CLT; 10	CAR; 42	HOM; 16*										27th	1814	
1996	FILMAR Racing	8	Ford	DAY; DNQ	CAR	RCH	ATL	NSV; 28*	DAR	BRI; 3	HCY	NZH	CLT; DNQ	DOV; 13	SBO	MYB	GLN; 9	MLW; 4	NHA; 30	TAL; 37	IRP	MCH; 22	BRI	DAR	RCH; 1*	DOV	CLT	CAR	HOM; 14										41st	1189	
1997	Ricky Craven Motorsports	2	Chevy	DAY	CAR	RCH	ATL	LVS	DAR	HCY	TEX; DNQ	BRI	NSV	TAL	NHA	NZH	CLT	DOV	SBO	GLN	MLW	MYB																	99th	85	
1997	FILMAR Racing	12	Ford																				GTY; DNQ	IRP	MCH	BRI	DAR	RCH; 26	DOV	CLT	CAL	CAR	HOM						99th	85	
1999	Team Rensi Motorsports	25	Chevy	DAY	CAR	LVS	ATL	DAR	TEX; DNQ	NSV; 26	BRI; 6	TAL	CAL	NHA; 22	RCH; 7	NZH	CLT; 15	DOV; 13	SBO	GLN	MLW; 17	MYB; 21	PPR	GTY; 27	IRP	MCH; 38	BRI; 6	DAR; 6	RCH; 4	DOV; 6	CLT; 27	CAR; 7	MEM; DNQ	PHO; 5	HOM; 19				23rd	2167	
2000	Team Rensi Motorsports	25	Chevy	DAY; 6	CAR; 6	LVS	ATL; 41	DAR; 31	BRI; 4			TAL; 11	CAL	RCH; DNQ	NHA	CLT; 41	DOV	SBO	MYB	GLN	MLW	NZH	PPR	GTY; 8	IRP	MCH	BRI; 4	DAR; 11	RCH; 6	DOV	CLT; 11	CAR; 9	MEM	PHO; 7	HOM				30th	1814	
2000	Bill Davis Racing	22	Pontiac							TEX; 30	NSV																												30th	1814	
2001	Innovative Motorsports	48	Chevy	DAY; 8	CAR; 4	LVS; 24	ATL; 19	DAR; 4	BRI; 5	TEX; 43	NSH; 36	TAL; 10	CAL; 38	RCH; 8	NHA; 5	NZH; 32	CLT; 30	DOV; 12	KEN; 35	MLW; 16	GLN; 11	CHI; 14	GTY; 6	**PPR**; 9	**IRP**; 11	MCH; 22	BRI; 3	DAR; 18	RCH; 23	DOV; 2	KAN; 25	CLT; 32	MEM; 21	PHO; 10	CAR; 1	HOM; 25			10th	3799	
2002	Innovative Motorsports	48	Chevy	DAY; 10	CAR; 12	LVS; 8	DAR; 5	BRI; 6	TEX; 25	NSH; 11		CAL; 14	RCH; 17	NHA; 26	NZH; 12	CLT; 12	DOV; 7	NSH; 6	KEN; 9	MLW; 18		CHI; 28	GTY; 19	PPR; 13	IRP; 5		BRI; 6	DAR; 11	RCH; 10	DOV; 9	KAN; 22	CLT; 22	MEM; 19	ATL; 18	CAR; 9	PHO; 30	HOM; 24		7th	4078	
2002	Innovative Motorsports	48	Pontiac								TAL; 9										DAY; 35					MCH; 18													7th	4078	
2003	Michael Waltrip Racing	99	Chevy	DAY	CAR	LVS	DAR	BRI	TEX	TAL	NSH	CAL	RCH	GTY; 10	NZH	CLT	DOV	NSH	KEN	MLW	DAY	CHI	NHA	PPR	IRP	MCH	BRI	DAR	RCH	DOV	KAN	CLT	MEM	ATL	PHO	CAR	HOM		155th	0	
2004	Bill Davis Racing	23	Chevy	DAY; 12	CAR; DNQ	LVS; 25	DAR; 12	BRI; 16	TEX; 37	NSH; 18	TAL; 6	CAL; 9	GTY; 33	RCH; 9	NZH; 9	CLT; 9	DOV; 11	NSH; 18	KEN; 33	MLW; 25	DAY; 30	CHI; 36	NHA; 7	PPR; 14	IRP; 9	MCH; 19	BRI; 14	CAL; 13	RCH; 33	DOV; 20*	KAN; 15	CLT; 9	MEM; 13	ATL; 7	PHO; 22	DAR; 7	HOM; 19		9th	3851	
2004	Stanton Barrett Motorsports	91	Pontiac		CAR; 16																																		9th	3851	
2005	Ppc Racing	22	Ford	DAY; 37	CAL; 13	MXC; 8	LVS; 23	ATL; 12	NSH; 2	BRI; 14	TEX; 9	PHO; 16	TAL; 35	DAR; 2	RCH; 20	CLT; 9	DOV; 9	NSH; 2	KEN; 14	MLW; 8	DAY; 4	CHI; 29	NHA; 11	PPR; 3	GTY; 24	IRP; 11	GLN; 28	MCH; 18	BRI; 35	CAL; 8	RCH; 31	DOV; 11	KAN; 24	CLT; 26	MEM; 18	TEX; 20	PHO; 14	HOM; 29	7th	4068	
2006	Ppc Racing	22	Ford	DAY; 13	CAL; 34	MXC; 19	LVS; 32	ATL; 19	BRI; 8	TEX; 27	NSH; 8	PHO; 28	TAL; 13	RCH; 23	DAR; 16	CLT; 13	DOV; 16	NSH; 11	KEN; 20	MLW; 8	DAY; 14	CHI; 29	NHA; 27	MAR; 13	GTY; 9	IRP; 20	GLN; 31	MCH; 18	BRI; 29	CAL; 36	RCH; 24	DOV; 14	KAN; 22	CLT; 19	MEM; 14	TEX; 16	PHO; 31	HOM; 26	11th	3626	
2007	Team Rensi Motorsports	25	Ford	DAY	CAL; 26	MXC	LVS	ATL	BRI	NSH	TEX	PHO	TAL	RCH	DAR	CLT	DOV	NSH	KEN	MLW	NHA	DAY	CHI																114th	146	
2007	Richard Childress Racing	2	Chevy																					GTY; 34	IRP	CGV	GLN	MCH	BRI	CAL	RCH	DOV	KAN	CLT					114th	146	
2007	Roush Fenway Racing	26	Ford																																MEM; QL^{†}	TEX	PHO	HOM	114th	146	
2008	Fitz Motorsports	36	Dodge	DAY; DNQ	CAL; 18	LVS; 13	ATL; 25	BRI; 11																															16th	3121	
2008	Jay Robinson Racing	28	Chevy						NSH; 32	TEX; 26	PHO; 20	MXC; 19	TAL; 30	RCH; 37	DAR; 17	CLT; 23	DOV; 20	NSH; 16	KEN; 29	MLW; 28	NHA; 23	DAY; 25	CHI; 28	GTY; 18	IRP; 22	CGV; 31	GLN; 21	MCH; 30	BRI; 26	CAL; 28	RCH; 18	DOV; 29	KAN; 28	CLT; 16	MEM; 3	TEX; 26	PHO; 15	HOM; 33	16th	3121	
2009	Jay Robinson Racing	28	Chevy	DAY; 16	CAL; 31	LVS; 14	BRI; 14	TEX; 21	NSH; 24	PHO; 29	TAL; 17	RCH; 23	DAR; 18	CLT; 18	DOV; 33	NSH; 16	KEN; 37	MLW; 33	NHA; 20	DAY; 16	CHI; 27	GTY; 29	IRP; 10	IOW; 7	GLN; 19	MCH; 22	BRI; 14	CGV; 17	ATL; 27	RCH; 26	DOV; 20	KAN; 20	CAL; 24	CLT; 21	MEM; 13	TEX; 17	PHO; 17	HOM; 17	11th	3569	
2010	Jay Robinson Racing	28	Chevy	DAY; 16	CAL; 29	LVS; 34	BRI; 19	NSH; 25	PHO; 21	TEX; 27	TAL; 11	RCH; 22	DAR; 20	DOV; 21	CLT; 28	NSH; 25	KEN; 22	ROA; 21	NHA; 32	DAY; 31	CHI; 28	GTY; 20	IRP; 35	IOW; 21	GLN; 21	MCH; 29	BRI; 29	CGV; 13	ATL; 25	RCH; 31	DOV; 22	KAN; 26	CAL; 23	CLT; 27		TEX; 24	PHO; 20	HOM; 28	19th	3198	
2010	Jay Robinson Racing	28	Toyota																																GTY; 13				19th	3198	
2011	RAB Racing	09	Toyota	DAY; 28	PHO; 10	LVS; 10	BRI; 17	CAL; 15	TEX; 20	TAL; 25	NSH; 12	RCH; 13	DAR; 11	DOV; 7	IOW; 6	CLT; 20	CHI; 7	MCH; 20	ROA; 28	DAY; 7	KEN; 6	NHA; 6	NSH; 10	IRP; 12	IOW; 7	GLN; 32	CGV; 16	BRI; 36	ATL; 19	RCH; 5	CHI; 17	DOV; 16	KAN; 19	CLT; 16	TEX; 13	PHO; 17	HOM; 33		7th	963	
2012	RAB Racing	09	Toyota	DAY; 30	PHO; 36	LVS; 11	BRI; 33	CAL; 7	TEX	RCH											CHI; 4																		22nd	311	
2012	RAB Racing	99	Toyota								TAL; 9	DAR	IOW	CLT	DOV	MCH; 34	ROA	KEN; 11	DAY	NHA									CHI; 20	KEN	DOV	CLT	KAN; 18	TEX; 15	PHO	HOM; 15			22nd	311	
2012	RAB Racing	24	Toyota																			IND; 19	IOW	GLN	CGV	BRI	ATL	RCH											22nd	311	
2013	RAB Racing	29	Toyota	DAY	PHO	LVS	BRI	CAL	TEX	RCH; 36	TAL	DAR	CLT; 29	DOV	IOW; 13	MCH	ROA	KEN	DAY	NHA	CHI	IND	IOW; 22	GLN	MOH	BRI; 19	ATL	RCH; 17	CHI; 17	KEN	DOV	KAN	CLT	TEX	PHO	HOM			38th	155	
2014	RAB Racing	29	Toyota	DAY	PHO	LVS	BRI	CAL	TEX	DAR	RCH	TAL	IOW	CLT	DOV	MCH	ROA	KEN	DAY	NHA	CHI	IND	IOW; 19	GLN	MOH	BRI	ATL	RCH	CHI	KEN	DOV	KAN	CLT	TEX	PHO	HOM			65th	25	
2015	JGL Racing	26	Toyota	DAY	ATL	LVS	PHO	CAL	TEX	BRI	RCH	TAL; 38																											51st	56	
2015	RAB Racing	29	Toyota										IOW; 23	CLT	DOV	MCH	CHI	DAY	KEN	NHA	IND																		51st	56	
2015	Joe Gibbs Racing	20	Toyota																			IOW; 15	GLN	MOH	BRI	ROA	DAR	RCH	CHI	KEN	DOV	CLT	KAN	TEX	PHO	HOM			51st	56	
^{†} - Qualified for Jamie McMurray

==== Camping World Truck Series ====
NASCAR Camping World Truck Series results
Year	Team	No.	Make	1	2	3	4	5	6	7	8	9	10	11	12	13	14	15	16	17	18	19	20	21	22	23	24	25	NCWTC	Pts	Ref
1995	Earl Barban Racing	90	Ford	PHO	TUS	SGS	MMR	POR	EVG	I70	LVL	BRI	MLW	CNS	HPT	IRP	FLM	RCH	MAR; 4	NWS; 8	SON	MMR	PHO; 15						44th	420	
1996	Penske Racing South	22	Ford	HOM	PHO	POR	EVG	TUS	CNS	HPT; 18	BRI	NZH	MLW	LVL	I70	IRP; 7	FLM	GLN	NSV	RCH; 14	NHA	MAR	NWS; 4	SON	MMR; 33	PHO; 12	LVS		34th	727	
2007	Billy Ballew Motorsports	51	Chevy	DAY	CAL	ATL	MAR	KAN	CLT	MFD	DOV	TEX	MCH	MLW	MEM	KEN	IRP	NSH	BRI	GTW; 17	NHA	LVS	TAL	MAR	ATL	TEX	PHO	HOM	83rd	124	
2008	Billy Ballew Motorsports	15	Toyota	DAY	CAL	ATL	MAR	KAN	CLT	MFD	DOV	TEX	MCH	MLW	MEM	KEN	IRP	NSH	BRI	GTW	NHA	LVS	TAL	MAR	ATL	TEX	PHO; 22	HOM	86th	97	
2013	SS-Green Light Racing	81	Toyota	DAY	MAR	CAR	KAN	CLT	DOV	TEX	KEN	IOW	ELD; 17	POC	MCH	BRI	MSP	IOW	CHI; 20	LVS	TAL	MAR	TEX	PHO	HOM				99th	0^{1}	

=== Superstar Racing Experience ===
(key) * – Most laps led. ^{1} – Heat 1 winner. ^{2} – Heat 2 winner.

Superstar Racing Experience results
Year	No.	1	2	3	4	5	6	SRXC	Pts
2023	36	STA	STA II; 9	MMS	BER	ELD	LOS; 8	18th	0^{1}

=== CARS Late Model Stock Car Tour ===
(key) (Bold – Pole position awarded by qualifying time. Italics – Pole position earned by points standings or practice time. * – Most laps led. ** – All laps led.)

CARS Late Model Stock Car Tour results
Year	Team	No.	Make	1	2	3	4	5	6	7	8	9	10	11	12	13	14	15	16	CLMSCTC	Pts	Ref
2023	N/A	36	Ford	SNM	FLC	HCY	ACE	NWS	LGY	DOM	CRW	HCY	ACE	TCM	WKS	AAS	SBO; 21	TCM	CRW	72nd	12	

^{*} Season still in progress
^{1} Ineligible for series points

Achievements
Preceded by None	NASCAR Nationwide Series Rookie of the Year; 1989	Succeeded by Joe Nemechek
Preceded by Inaugural	Prelude to the Dream Winner; 2005	Succeeded by Tony Stewart
