= 1990 Goody's 500 =

24th race of the 1990 NASCAR Winston Cup Series

Race details
- Race 24 of 29 in the 1990 NASCAR Winston Cup Series
- The 1990 Goody's 500 program cover, featuring Rusty Wallace, Dale Earnhardt, and Darrell Waltrip.
- Date: September 23, 1990
- Official name: 42nd Annual Goody's 500
- Location: Ridgeway, Virginia, Martinsville Speedway
- Course: Permanent racing facility
- Course length: 0.526 miles (0.847 km)
- Distance: 500 laps, 263 mi (423.257 km)
- Scheduled distance: 500 laps, 263 mi (423.257 km)
- Average speed: 76.386 miles per hour (122.931 km/h)
- Attendance: 44,000

Pole position
Driver	Mark Martin	Roush Racing
- Time: 20.679

Most laps led
Driver	Ricky Rudd	Hendrick Motorsports
- Laps: 85

Winner
No. 11	Geoff Bodine	Junior Johnson & Associates

Television in the United States
- Network: ESPN
- Announcers: Bob Jenkins, Ned Jarrett, Benny Parsons

Radio in the United States
- Radio: Motor Racing Network

The 1990 Goody's 500 was the 24th stock car race of the 1990 NASCAR Winston Cup Series season and the 42nd iteration of the event. The race was held on Sunday, September 23, 1990, before an audience of 44,000 in Martinsville, Virginia at Martinsville Speedway, a 0.526 miles (0.847 km) permanent oval-shaped short track. The race took the scheduled 500 laps to complete. In the final stages of the race, Junior Johnson & Associates driver Geoff Bodine would manage to mount a late-race comeback, passing for the lead with 42 laps left in the race after being involved in an incident on lap 320. The victory was Bodine's ninth career NASCAR Winston Cup Series season and his second and final victory of the season. To fill out the top three, Richard Childress Racing driver Dale Earnhardt and Roush Racing driver Mark Martin would finish second and third, respectively.

== Background ==
The layout of Martinsville Speedway, the venue where the race was held.

Martinsville Speedway is a NASCAR-owned stock car racing track located in Henry County, in Ridgeway, Virginia, just to the south of Martinsville. At 0.526 miles (0.847 km) in length, it is the shortest track in the NASCAR Cup Series. The track was also one of the first paved oval tracks in NASCAR, being built in 1947 by H. Clay Earles. It is also the only remaining race track that has been on the NASCAR circuit from its beginning in 1948.

=== Entry list ===
- (R) denotes rookie driver.

#	Driver	Team	Make
1	Terry Labonte	Precision Products Racing	Oldsmobile
2	Ron Esau	U.S. Racing	Pontiac
3	Dale Earnhardt	Richard Childress Racing	Chevrolet
4	Ernie Irvan	Morgan–McClure Motorsports	Oldsmobile
5	Ricky Rudd	Hendrick Motorsports	Chevrolet
6	Mark Martin	Roush Racing	Ford
7	Alan Kulwicki	AK Racing	Ford
8	Bobby Hillin Jr.	Stavola Brothers Racing	Buick
9	Bill Elliott	Melling Racing	Ford
10	Derrike Cope	Whitcomb Racing	Chevrolet
11	Geoff Bodine	Junior Johnson & Associates	Ford
12	Hut Stricklin	Bobby Allison Motorsports	Buick
15	Morgan Shepherd	Bud Moore Engineering	Ford
17	Darrell Waltrip	Hendrick Motorsports	Chevrolet
19	Chad Little	Little Racing	Ford
20	Rob Moroso (R)	Moroso Racing	Oldsmobile
21	Dale Jarrett	Wood Brothers Racing	Ford
25	Ken Schrader	Hendrick Motorsports	Chevrolet
26	Brett Bodine	King Racing	Buick
27	Rusty Wallace	Blue Max Racing	Pontiac
28	Davey Allison	Robert Yates Racing	Ford
30	Michael Waltrip	Bahari Racing	Pontiac
33	Harry Gant	Leo Jackson Motorsports	Oldsmobile
42	Kyle Petty	SABCO Racing	Pontiac
43	Richard Petty	Petty Enterprises	Pontiac
52	Jimmy Means	Jimmy Means Racing	Pontiac
57	Jimmy Spencer	Osterlund Racing	Pontiac
66	Dick Trickle	Cale Yarborough Motorsports	Pontiac
70	J. D. McDuffie	McDuffie Racing	Pontiac
71	Dave Marcis	Marcis Auto Racing	Chevrolet
75	Rick Wilson	RahMoc Enterprises	Pontiac
94	Sterling Marlin	Hagan Racing	Oldsmobile
98	Rick Mast	Travis Carter Enterprises	Chevrolet

== Qualifying ==
Qualifying was split into two rounds. The first round was held on Friday, September 21, at 3:00 PM EST. Each driver would have one lap to set a time. During the first round, the top 20 drivers in the round would be guaranteed a starting spot in the race. If a driver was not able to guarantee a spot in the first round, they had the option to scrub their time from the first round and try and run a faster lap time in a second round qualifying run, held on Saturday, September 22, at 12:30 PM EST. As with the first round, each driver would have one lap to set a time. For this specific race, positions 21-30 would be decided on time, and depending on who needed it, a select amount of positions were given to cars who had not otherwise qualified but were high enough in owner's points; up to two were given.

Mark Martin, driving for Roush Racing, would win the pole, setting a time of 20.679 and an average speed of 91.571 miles per hour (147.369 km/h) in the first round.

Two drivers would fail to qualify.

=== Full qualifying results ===
Pos.	#	Driver	Team	Make	Time	Speed
1	6	Mark Martin	Roush Racing	Ford	20.679	91.571
2	27	Rusty Wallace	Blue Max Racing	Pontiac	20.700	91.478
3	33	Harry Gant	Leo Jackson Motorsports	Oldsmobile	20.775	91.148
4	25	Ken Schrader	Hendrick Motorsports	Chevrolet	20.803	91.025
5	42	Kyle Petty	SABCO Racing	Pontiac	20.806	91.012
6	21	Dale Jarrett	Wood Brothers Racing	Ford	20.811	90.990
7	30	Michael Waltrip	Bahari Racing	Pontiac	20.881	90.685
8	3	Dale Earnhardt	Richard Childress Racing	Chevrolet	20.885	90.668
9	4	Ernie Irvan	Morgan–McClure Motorsports	Oldsmobile	20.930	90.473
10	9	Bill Elliott	Melling Racing	Ford	20.941	90.425
11	17	Darrell Waltrip	Hendrick Motorsports	Chevrolet	20.962	90.335
12	1	Terry Labonte	Precision Products Racing	Oldsmobile	20.971	90.296
13	71	Dave Marcis	Marcis Auto Racing	Chevrolet	20.984	90.240
14	11	Geoff Bodine	Junior Johnson & Associates	Ford	20.990	90.214
15	94	Sterling Marlin	Hagan Racing	Oldsmobile	21.012	90.120
16	5	Ricky Rudd	Hendrick Motorsports	Chevrolet	21.058	89.923
17	12	Hut Stricklin	Bobby Allison Motorsports	Buick	21.072	89.863
18	75	Rick Wilson	RahMoc Enterprises	Oldsmobile	21.075	89.851
19	7	Alan Kulwicki	AK Racing	Ford	21.091	89.782
20	66	Dick Trickle	Cale Yarborough Motorsports	Pontiac	21.095	89.765
Failed to lock in Round 1
21	43	Richard Petty	Petty Enterprises	Pontiac	21.135	89.595
22	28	Davey Allison	Robert Yates Racing	Ford	21.139	89.579
23	52	Jimmy Means	Jimmy Means Racing	Pontiac	21.149	89.536
24	98	Rick Mast	Travis Carter Enterprises	Chevrolet	21.164	89.473
25	15	Morgan Shepherd	Bud Moore Engineering	Ford	21.283	88.972
26	8	Bobby Hillin Jr.	Stavola Brothers Racing	Buick	21.303	88.889
27	26	Brett Bodine	King Racing	Buick	21.322	88.810
28	20	Rob Moroso (R)	Moroso Racing	Oldsmobile	21.373	88.598
29	57	Jimmy Spencer	Osterlund Racing	Pontiac	21.396	88.503
30	19	Chad Little	Little Racing	Ford	21.418	88.412
Provisional
31	10	Derrike Cope	Whitcomb Racing	Chevrolet	21.606	87.643
Failed to qualify
32	70	J. D. McDuffie	McDuffie Racing	Pontiac	21.491	88.111
33	2	Ron Esau	U.S. Racing	Pontiac	21.700	87.263
Official first round qualifying results
Official starting lineup

== Race results ==
Fin	St	#	Driver	Team	Make	Laps	Led	Status	Pts	Winnings
1	14	11	Geoff Bodine	Junior Johnson & Associates	Ford	500	69	running	180	$53,850
2	8	3	Dale Earnhardt	Richard Childress Racing	Chevrolet	500	25	running	175	$30,550
3	1	6	Mark Martin	Roush Racing	Ford	500	14	running	170	$24,450
4	27	26	Brett Bodine	King Racing	Buick	500	40	running	165	$16,807
5	3	33	Harry Gant	Leo Jackson Motorsports	Oldsmobile	500	0	running	155	$18,100
6	19	7	Alan Kulwicki	AK Racing	Ford	500	40	running	155	$10,975
7	22	28	Davey Allison	Robert Yates Racing	Ford	500	0	running	146	$9,300
8	10	9	Bill Elliott	Melling Racing	Ford	500	84	running	147	$14,150
9	12	1	Terry Labonte	Precision Products Racing	Oldsmobile	498	0	running	138	$9,100
10	6	21	Dale Jarrett	Wood Brothers Racing	Ford	497	0	running	134	$10,725
11	9	4	Ernie Irvan	Morgan–McClure Motorsports	Oldsmobile	497	0	running	130	$7,435
12	15	94	Sterling Marlin	Hagan Racing	Oldsmobile	495	0	running	127	$6,850
13	17	12	Hut Stricklin	Bobby Allison Motorsports	Buick	494	0	running	124	$5,150
14	13	71	Dave Marcis	Marcis Auto Racing	Chevrolet	494	0	running	121	$6,450
15	2	27	Rusty Wallace	Blue Max Racing	Pontiac	493	39	running	123	$19,275
16	23	52	Jimmy Means	Jimmy Means Racing	Pontiac	491	0	running	115	$4,650
17	30	19	Chad Little	Little Racing	Ford	490	0	running	112	$3,350
18	29	57	Jimmy Spencer	Osterlund Racing	Pontiac	488	0	running	109	$5,750
19	11	17	Darrell Waltrip	Hendrick Motorsports	Chevrolet	487	0	running	106	$10,850
20	18	75	Rick Wilson	RahMoc Enterprises	Oldsmobile	472	0	running	103	$6,175
21	28	20	Rob Moroso (R)	Moroso Racing	Oldsmobile	468	0	running	100	$4,950
22	20	66	Dick Trickle	Cale Yarborough Motorsports	Pontiac	466	0	accident	97	$6,025
23	5	42	Kyle Petty	SABCO Racing	Pontiac	464	0	running	94	$8,750
24	31	10	Derrike Cope	Whitcomb Racing	Chevrolet	450	0	engine	91	$6,900
25	25	15	Morgan Shepherd	Bud Moore Engineering	Ford	402	33	timing chain	93	$4,875
26	26	8	Bobby Hillin Jr.	Stavola Brothers Racing	Buick	362	0	transmission	85	$4,650
27	4	25	Ken Schrader	Hendrick Motorsports	Chevrolet	289	71	accident	87	$10,150
28	16	5	Ricky Rudd	Hendrick Motorsports	Chevrolet	289	85	accident	89	$6,200
29	21	43	Richard Petty	Petty Enterprises	Pontiac	229	0	engine	76	$2,250
30	7	30	Michael Waltrip	Bahari Racing	Pontiac	114	0	engine	73	$3,700
31	24	98	Rick Mast	Travis Carter Enterprises	Chevrolet	36	0	crash	70	$2,200
Official race results

== Standings after the race ==
Drivers' Championship standings

	Pos	Driver	Points
	1	Mark Martin	3,689
	2	Dale Earnhardt	3,673 (-16)
	3	Geoff Bodine	3,360 (-329)
	4	Bill Elliott	3,253 (–436)
	5	Rusty Wallace	3,221 (–468)
	6	Kyle Petty	3,004 (–685)
	7	Ricky Rudd	2,993 (–696)
2	8	Ernie Irvan	2,934 (–755)
1	9	Morgan Shepherd	2,915 (–774)
1	10	Ken Schrader	2,894 (–795)
Official driver's standings

- Note: Only the first 10 positions are included for the driver standings.

Previous race: 1990 Peak Antifreeze 500	NASCAR Winston Cup Series; 1990 season	Next race: 1990 Tyson Holly Farms 400
