= 1990 Peak AntiFreeze 500 =

23rd race of the 1990 NASCAR Winston Cup Series

1990 Peak Antifreeze 500
Race details
- Race 23 of 29 in the 1990 NASCAR Winston Cup Series
- The 1990 Peak Antifreeze 500 program cover, featuring Kyle Petty.
- Date: September 16, 1990
- Official name: 20th Annual Peak Antifreeze 500
- Location: Dover, Delaware, Dover Downs International Speedway
- Course: Permanent racing facility
- Course length: 1 miles (1.609 km)
- Distance: 500 laps, 500 mi (804.672 km)
- Average speed: 125.945 miles per hour (202.689 km/h)
- Attendance: 74,000

Pole position
| Driver | Bill Elliott | Melling Racing |
- Time: 24.840

Most laps led
| Driver | Bill Elliott | Melling Racing |
- Laps: 364

Winner
| No. 9 | Bill Elliott | Melling Racing |

Television in the United States
- Network: ESPN
- Announcers: Bob Jenkins, Benny Parsons, Ned Jarrett

Radio in the United States
- Radio: Motor Racing Network

The 1990 Peak Antifreeze 500 was the 23rd stock car race of the 1990 NASCAR Winston Cup Series season and the 20th iteration of the event. The race was held on Sunday, September 16, 1990, before an audience of 74,000 in Dover, Delaware at Dover Downs International Speedway, a 1-mile (1.6 km) permanent oval-shaped racetrack. The race took the scheduled 500 laps to complete. At race's end, Melling Racing driver Bill Elliott would manage to dominate a majority of the race, leading 364 laps of the race to take his 33rd career NASCAR Winston Cup Series victory and his only victory of the season. To fill out the top three, Roush Racing driver Mark Martin and Richard Childress Racing driver Dale Earnhardt would finish second and third, respectively.

== Background ==
The layout of Dover Downs International Speedway, the venue where the race was held.

Dover Downs International Speedway is an oval race track in Dover, Delaware, United States that has held at least two NASCAR races since it opened in 1969. In addition to NASCAR, the track also hosted USAC and the NTT IndyCar Series. The track features one layout, a 1-mile (1.6 km) concrete oval, with 24° banking in the turns and 9° banking on the straights. The speedway is owned and operated by Dover Motorsports.

The track, nicknamed "The Monster Mile", was built in 1969 by Melvin Joseph of Melvin L. Joseph Construction Company, Inc., with an asphalt surface, but was replaced with concrete in 1995. Six years later in 2001, the track's capacity moved to 135,000 seats, making the track have the largest capacity of sports venue in the mid-Atlantic. In 2002, the name changed to Dover International Speedway from Dover Downs International Speedway after Dover Downs Gaming and Entertainment split, making Dover Motorsports. From 2007 to 2009, the speedway worked on an improvement project called "The Monster Makeover", which expanded facilities at the track and beautified the track. After the 2014 season, the track's capacity was reduced to 95,500 seats.

=== Entry list ===
- (R) denotes rookie driver.

| # | Driver | Team | Make |
|---|---|---|---|
| 1 | Terry Labonte | Precision Products Racing | Oldsmobile |
| 2 | Jim Sauter | U.S. Racing | Pontiac |
| 3 | Dale Earnhardt | Richard Childress Racing | Chevrolet |
| 4 | Ernie Irvan | Morgan–McClure Motorsports | Oldsmobile |
| 5 | Ricky Rudd | Hendrick Motorsports | Chevrolet |
| 6 | Mark Martin | Roush Racing | Ford |
| 7 | Alan Kulwicki | AK Racing | Ford |
| 8 | Bobby Hillin Jr. | Stavola Brothers Racing | Buick |
| 9 | Bill Elliott | Melling Racing | Ford |
| 09 | Jerry Hufflin | Smith Racing | Pontiac |
| 10 | Derrike Cope | Whitcomb Racing | Chevrolet |
| 11 | Geoff Bodine | Junior Johnson & Associates | Ford |
| 12 | Hut Stricklin | Bobby Allison Motorsports | Buick |
| 15 | Morgan Shepherd | Bud Moore Engineering | Ford |
| 17 | Darrell Waltrip | Hendrick Motorsports | Chevrolet |
| 18 | Greg Sacks | Hendrick Motorsports | Chevrolet |
| 20 | Rob Moroso (R) | Moroso Racing | Oldsmobile |
| 21 | Dale Jarrett | Wood Brothers Racing | Ford |
| 25 | Ken Schrader | Hendrick Motorsports | Chevrolet |
| 26 | Brett Bodine | King Racing | Buick |
| 27 | Rusty Wallace | Blue Max Racing | Pontiac |
| 28 | Davey Allison | Robert Yates Racing | Ford |
| 30 | Michael Waltrip | Bahari Racing | Pontiac |
| 33 | Harry Gant | Leo Jackson Motorsports | Oldsmobile |
| 42 | Kyle Petty | SABCO Racing | Pontiac |
| 43 | Richard Petty | Petty Enterprises | Pontiac |
| 48 | James Hylton | Hylton Motorsports | Buick |
| 51 | Jeff Purvis | Phoenix Racing | Chevrolet |
| 52 | Jimmy Means | Jimmy Means Racing | Pontiac |
| 54 | Tommy Riggins | Hakes–Welliver Racing | Oldsmobile |
| 57 | Jimmy Spencer | Osterlund Racing | Pontiac |
| 66 | Dick Trickle | Cale Yarborough Motorsports | Pontiac |
| 70 | J. D. McDuffie | McDuffie Racing | Pontiac |
| 71 | Dave Marcis | Marcis Auto Racing | Chevrolet |
| 74 | Mike Potter | Wawak Racing | Pontiac |
| 75 | Rick Wilson | RahMoc Enterprises | Pontiac |
| 80 | Jimmy Horton | S&H Racing | Pontiac |
| 83 | Lake Speed* | Speed Racing | Oldsmobile |
| 94 | Sterling Marlin | Hagan Racing | Oldsmobile |
| 98 | Butch Miller | Travis Carter Enterprises | Chevrolet |

*Driver changed to Tommy Ellis for the race after Speed broken his right shoulder in the race weekend's final practice session.

== Qualifying ==
Qualifying was split into two rounds. The first round was held on Friday, September 14, at 3:00 PM EST. Each driver would have one lap to set a time. During the first round, the top 20 drivers in the round would be guaranteed a starting spot in the race. If a driver was not able to guarantee a spot in the first round, they had the option to scrub their time from the first round and try and run a faster lap time in a second round qualifying run, held on Saturday, September 15, at 11:30 AM EST. As with the first round, each driver would have one lap to set a time. For this specific race, positions 21-40 would be decided on time, and depending on who needed it, a select amount of positions were given to cars who had not otherwise qualified but were high enough in owner's points; up to two provisionals were given.

Bill Elliott, driving for Melling Racing, would win the pole, setting a time of 24.840 and an average speed of 144.928 miles per hour (233.239 km/h) in the first round.

No drivers would fail to qualify.

=== Full qualifying results ===
| Pos. | # | Driver | Team | Make | Time | Speed |
|---|---|---|---|---|---|---|
| 1 | 9 | Bill Elliott | Melling Racing | Ford | 24.840 | 144.928 |
| 2 | 11 | Geoff Bodine | Bud Moore Engineering | Ford | 24.850 | 144.869 |
| 3 | 3 | Dale Earnhardt | Richard Childress Racing | Chevrolet | 24.892 | 144.625 |
| 4 | 4 | Ernie Irvan | Morgan–McClure Motorsports | Chevrolet | 24.924 | 144.439 |
| 5 | 7 | Alan Kulwicki | AK Racing | Ford | 24.988 | 144.069 |
| 6 | 6 | Mark Martin | Roush Racing | Ford | 24.989 | 144.063 |
| 7 | 28 | Davey Allison | Robert Yates Racing | Ford | 25.004 | 143.977 |
| 8 | 33 | Harry Gant | Leo Jackson Motorsports | Oldsmobile | 25.014 | 143.919 |
| 9 | 27 | Rusty Wallace | Blue Max Racing | Pontiac | 25.042 | 143.758 |
| 10 | 26 | Brett Bodine | King Racing | Buick | 25.097 | 143.443 |
| 11 | 21 | Dale Jarrett | Wood Brothers Racing | Ford | 25.108 | 143.381 |
| 12 | 66 | Dick Trickle | Cale Yarborough Motorsports | Pontiac | 25.114 | 143.346 |
| 13 | 15 | Morgan Shepherd | Bud Moore Engineering | Ford | 25.145 | 143.170 |
| 14 | 71 | Dave Marcis | Marcis Auto Racing | Chevrolet | 25.244 | 142.608 |
| 15 | 42 | Kyle Petty | SABCO Racing | Pontiac | 25.247 | 142.591 |
| 16 | 43 | Richard Petty | Petty Enterprises | Pontiac | 25.294 | 142.326 |
| 17 | 20 | Rob Moroso (R) | Moroso Racing | Oldsmobile | 25.306 | 142.259 |
| 18 | 94 | Sterling Marlin | Hagan Racing | Oldsmobile | 25.312 | 142.225 |
| 19 | 30 | Michael Waltrip | Bahari Racing | Pontiac | 25.330 | 142.124 |
| 20 | 5 | Ricky Rudd | Hendrick Motorsports | Chevrolet | 25.338 | 142.079 |
Failed to lock in Round 1
| 21 | 8 | Bobby Hillin Jr. | Stavola Brothers Racing | Buick | 25.339 | 142.073 |
| 22 | 1 | Terry Labonte | Precision Products Racing | Oldsmobile | 25.345 | 142.040 |
| 23 | 25 | Ken Schrader | Hendrick Motorsports | Chevrolet | 25.357 | 141.973 |
| 24 | 17 | Darrell Waltrip | Hendrick Motorsports | Chevrolet | 25.363 | 141.939 |
| 25 | 10 | Derrike Cope | Whitcomb Racing | Chevrolet | 25.366 | 141.922 |
| 26 | 12 | Hut Stricklin | Bobby Allison Motorsports | Buick | 25.393 | 141.771 |
| 27 | 98 | Butch Miller | Travis Carter Enterprises | Chevrolet | 25.533 | 140.994 |
| 28 | 51 | Jeff Purvis | Phoenix Racing | Chevrolet | 25.559 | 140.851 |
| 29 | 18 | Greg Sacks | Hendrick Motorsports | Chevrolet | 25.560 | 140.845 |
| 30 | 57 | Jimmy Spencer | Osterlund Racing | Pontiac | 25.603 | 140.609 |
| 31 | 75 | Rick Wilson | RahMoc Enterprises | Oldsmobile | 25.612 | 140.559 |
| 32 | 83 | Lake Speed | Speed Racing | Oldsmobile | 25.650 | 140.351 |
| 33 | 2 | Jim Sauter | U.S. Racing | Pontiac | 25.713 | 140.007 |
| 34 | 80 | Jimmy Horton | S&H Racing | Pontiac | 25.805 | 139.508 |
| 35 | 52 | Jimmy Means | Jimmy Means Racing | Pontiac | 26.099 | 137.936 |
| 36 | 74 | Mike Potter | Wawak Racing | Pontiac | 26.108 | 137.889 |
| 37 | 54 | Tommy Riggins | Hakes–Welliver Racing | Oldsmobile | 26.441 | 136.152 |
| 38 | 48 | James Hylton | Hylton Motorsports | Buick | 26.717 | 134.746 |
| 39 | 70 | J. D. McDuffie | McDuffie Racing | Pontiac | 26.806 | 134.298 |
| 40 | 09 | Jerry Hufflin | Smith Racing | Pontiac | 28.058 | 128.306 |
Official first round qualifying results
Official starting lineup

== Race results ==
| Fin | St | # | Driver | Team | Make | Laps | Led | Status | Pts | Winnings |
|---|---|---|---|---|---|---|---|---|---|---|
| 1 | 1 | 9 | Bill Elliott | Melling Racing | Ford | 500 | 364 | running | 185 | $83,100 |
| 2 | 6 | 6 | Mark Martin | Roush Racing | Ford | 500 | 31 | running | 175 | $35,325 |
| 3 | 3 | 3 | Dale Earnhardt | Richard Childress Racing | Chevrolet | 500 | 102 | running | 170 | $29,375 |
| 4 | 8 | 33 | Harry Gant | Leo Jackson Motorsports | Oldsmobile | 499 | 1 | running | 165 | $19,425 |
| 5 | 19 | 30 | Michael Waltrip | Bahari Racing | Pontiac | 499 | 0 | running | 155 | $16,825 |
| 6 | 11 | 21 | Dale Jarrett | Wood Brothers Racing | Ford | 499 | 0 | running | 150 | $13,675 |
| 7 | 9 | 27 | Rusty Wallace | Blue Max Racing | Pontiac | 499 | 0 | running | 146 | $18,175 |
| 8 | 15 | 42 | Kyle Petty | SABCO Racing | Pontiac | 499 | 0 | running | 142 | $13,675 |
| 9 | 7 | 28 | Davey Allison | Robert Yates Racing | Ford | 499 | 0 | running | 138 | $14,075 |
| 10 | 23 | 25 | Ken Schrader | Hendrick Motorsports | Chevrolet | 498 | 0 | running | 134 | $14,875 |
| 11 | 26 | 12 | Hut Stricklin | Bobby Allison Motorsports | Buick | 497 | 0 | running | 130 | $8,282 |
| 12 | 18 | 94 | Sterling Marlin | Hagan Racing | Oldsmobile | 497 | 0 | running | 127 | $8,625 |
| 13 | 25 | 10 | Derrike Cope | Whitcomb Racing | Chevrolet | 496 | 0 | running | 124 | $9,775 |
| 14 | 21 | 8 | Bobby Hillin Jr. | Stavola Brothers Racing | Buick | 495 | 0 | running | 121 | $8,025 |
| 15 | 22 | 1 | Terry Labonte | Precision Products Racing | Oldsmobile | 495 | 0 | running | 118 | $8,350 |
| 16 | 16 | 43 | Richard Petty | Petty Enterprises | Pontiac | 494 | 0 | running | 115 | $5,600 |
| 17 | 27 | 98 | Butch Miller | Travis Carter Enterprises | Chevrolet | 493 | 0 | running | 112 | $5,350 |
| 18 | 30 | 57 | Jimmy Spencer | Osterlund Racing | Pontiac | 493 | 0 | running | 109 | $7,000 |
| 19 | 24 | 17 | Darrell Waltrip | Hendrick Motorsports | Chevrolet | 492 | 0 | running | 106 | $12,650 |
| 20 | 10 | 26 | Brett Bodine | King Racing | Buick | 492 | 0 | running | 103 | $7,475 |
| 21 | 29 | 18 | Greg Sacks | Hendrick Motorsports | Chevrolet | 491 | 0 | running | 100 | $3,550 |
| 22 | 14 | 71 | Dave Marcis | Marcis Auto Racing | Chevrolet | 491 | 0 | running | 97 | $6,500 |
| 23 | 12 | 66 | Dick Trickle | Cale Yarborough Motorsports | Pontiac | 478 | 0 | running | 94 | $7,400 |
| 24 | 35 | 52 | Jimmy Means | Jimmy Means Racing | Pontiac | 461 | 0 | engine | 91 | $4,250 |
| 25 | 13 | 15 | Morgan Shepherd | Bud Moore Engineering | Ford | 441 | 0 | running | 88 | $6,200 |
| 26 | 4 | 4 | Ernie Irvan | Morgan–McClure Motorsports | Chevrolet | 427 | 0 | running | 85 | $6,000 |
| 27 | 31 | 75 | Rick Wilson | RahMoc Enterprises | Oldsmobile | 395 | 0 | engine | 82 | $5,925 |
| 28 | 17 | 20 | Rob Moroso (R) | Moroso Racing | Oldsmobile | 394 | 0 | accident | 79 | $4,600 |
| 29 | 5 | 7 | Alan Kulwicki | AK Racing | Ford | 342 | 0 | engine | 76 | $5,775 |
| 30 | 34 | 80 | Jimmy Horton | S&H Racing | Pontiac | 318 | 0 | engine | 73 | $3,100 |
| 31 | 32 | 83 | Tommy Ellis | Speed Racing | Oldsmobile | 285 | 0 | engine | 0 | $3,050 |
| 32 | 20 | 5 | Ricky Rudd | Hendrick Motorsports | Chevrolet | 246 | 0 | overheating | 67 | $5,600 |
| 33 | 28 | 51 | Jeff Purvis | Phoenix Racing | Chevrolet | 222 | 0 | accident | 64 | $2,950 |
| 34 | 33 | 2 | Jim Sauter | U.S. Racing | Pontiac | 203 | 0 | engine | 61 | $4,900 |
| 35 | 38 | 48 | James Hylton | Hylton Motorsports | Buick | 202 | 0 | engine | 0 | $2,800 |
| 36 | 2 | 11 | Geoff Bodine | Bud Moore Engineering | Ford | 175 | 2 | engine | 60 | $12,825 |
| 37 | 40 | 09 | Jerry Hufflin | Smith Racing | Pontiac | 130 | 0 | oil leak | 52 | $2,750 |
| 38 | 36 | 74 | Mike Potter | Wawak Racing | Pontiac | 113 | 0 | handling | 49 | $2,700 |
| 39 | 37 | 54 | Tommy Riggins | Hakes–Welliver Racing | Oldsmobile | 105 | 0 | oil pan | 46 | $2,675 |
| 40 | 39 | 70 | J. D. McDuffie | McDuffie Racing | Pontiac | 18 | 0 | transmission | 43 | $2,650 |
Official race results

== Standings after the race ==
Drivers' Championship standings

| | Pos | Driver | Points |
|---|---|---|---|
| | 1 | Mark Martin | 3,519 |
| | 2 | Dale Earnhardt | 3,498 (-21) |
| | 3 | Geoff Bodine | 3,180 (-339) |
| 1 | 4 | Bill Elliott | 3,106 (–413) |
| 1 | 5 | Rusty Wallace | 3,908 (–421) |
| 2 | 6 | Kyle Petty | 2,910 (–609) |
| 1 | 7 | Ricky Rudd | 2,904 (–615) |
| 1 | 8 | Morgan Shepherd | 2,822 (–697) |
| | 9 | Ken Schrader | 2,807 (–712) |
| | 10 | Ernie Irvan | 2,804 (–715) |
Official driver's standings

- Note: Only the first 10 positions are included for the driver standings.

| Previous race: 1990 Miller Genuine Draft 400 (Richmond) | NASCAR Winston Cup Series; 1990 season | Next race: 1990 Goody's 500 |
