= 1990 AC Delco 500 =

27th race of the 1990 NASCAR Winston Cup Series

Race details
- Race 27 of 29 in the 1990 NASCAR Winston Cup Series
- The 1990 AC Delco 500 program cover, featuring Rusty Wallace.
- Date: October 21, 1990
- Official name: 26th Annual AC Delco 500
- Location: Rockingham, North Carolina, North Carolina Motor Speedway
- Course: Permanent racing facility
- Course length: 1.017 miles (1.636 km)
- Distance: 492 laps, 500.364 mi (805.257 km)
- Scheduled distance: 492 laps, 500.364 mi (805.257 km)
- Average speed: 126.452 miles per hour (203.505 km/h)
- Attendance: 55,800

Pole position
Driver	Ken Schrader	Hendrick Motorsports
- Time: 24.769

Most laps led
Driver	Kyle Petty	SABCO Racing
- Laps: 207

Winner
No. 7	Alan Kulwicki	AK Racing

Television in the United States
- Network: ESPN
- Announcers: Bob Jenkins, Ned Jarrett, Benny Parsons

Radio in the United States
- Radio: Motor Racing Network

The 1990 AC Delco 500 was the 27th stock car race of the 1990 NASCAR Winston Cup Series season and the 26th iteration of the event. The race was held on Sunday, October 21, 1990, before an audience of 55,800 in Rockingham, North Carolina, at North Carolina Speedway, a 1.017 miles (1.637 km) permanent high-banked racetrack. At race's end, owner-driver Alan Kulwicki would manage to dominate the late stages of the race to take his second career NASCAR Winston Cup Series victory and his only victory of the season. To fill out the top three, Melling Racing driver Bill Elliott and Leo Jackson Motorsports driver Harry Gant would finish second and third, respectively.

In the driver's championship, second-place driver in the standings, Dale Earnhardt, was able to gain four points over first-place driver Mark Martin, dropping Martin's lead down to 45 points.

== Background ==
The layout of North Carolina Speedway, the venue where the race was held.

North Carolina Speedway was opened as a flat, one-mile oval on October 31, 1965. In 1969, the track was extensively reconfigured to a high-banked, D-shaped oval just over one mile in length. In 1997, North Carolina Motor Speedway merged with Penske Motorsports, and was renamed North Carolina Speedway. Shortly thereafter, the infield was reconfigured, and competition on the infield road course, mostly by the SCCA, was discontinued. Currently, the track is home to the Fast Track High Performance Driving School.

=== Entry list ===
- (R) denotes rookie driver.

#	Driver	Team	Make	Sponsor
0	Delma Cowart	H. L. Waters Racing	Ford	Masters Inn Economy
1	Terry Labonte	Precision Products Racing	Oldsmobile	Skoal
2	Rick Jeffrey	U.S. Racing	Chevrolet	KFC
3	Dale Earnhardt	Richard Childress Racing	Chevrolet	GM Goodwrench Service Plus
4	Ernie Irvan	Morgan–McClure Motorsports	Oldsmobile	Kodak
5	Ricky Rudd	Hendrick Motorsports	Chevrolet	Levi Garrett
6	Mark Martin	Roush Racing	Ford	Folgers
7	Alan Kulwicki	AK Racing	Ford	Zerex
8	Bobby Hillin Jr.	Stavola Brothers Racing	Buick	Snickers
9	Bill Elliott	Melling Racing	Ford	Coors Light
10	Derrike Cope	Whitcomb Racing	Chevrolet	Purolator Filters
11	Geoff Bodine	Junior Johnson & Associates	Ford	Budweiser
12	Hut Stricklin	Bobby Allison Motorsports	Buick	Raybestos
13	Mike Skinner	Mansion Motorsports	Chevrolet	Glidden
15	Morgan Shepherd	Bud Moore Engineering	Ford	Motorcraft
17	Darrell Waltrip	Hendrick Motorsports	Chevrolet	Tide
19	Chad Little	Little Racing	Ford	Bull's-Eye Barbecue Sauce
20	Jimmy Hensley	Moroso Racing	Oldsmobile	Crown Central Petroleum
21	Dale Jarrett	Wood Brothers Racing	Ford	Citgo
25	Ken Schrader	Hendrick Motorsports	Chevrolet	Kodiak
26	Brett Bodine	King Racing	Buick	Quaker State
27	Rusty Wallace	Blue Max Racing	Pontiac	Miller Genuine Draft
28	Davey Allison	Robert Yates Racing	Ford	Texaco, Havoline
30	Michael Waltrip	Bahari Racing	Pontiac	Country Time
33	Harry Gant	Leo Jackson Motorsports	Oldsmobile	Skoal Bandit
40	Tommy Kendall	Reno Enterprises	Chevrolet	Electronic Data Systems
41	Larry Pearson	Larry Hedrick Motorsports	Chevrolet	General Motors Auctions
42	Kyle Petty	SABCO Racing	Pontiac	Peak Antifreeze
43	Richard Petty	Petty Enterprises	Pontiac	STP
47	Jack Pennington (R)	Close Racing	Oldsmobile	Sandoz Chemicals
48	James Hylton	Hylton Motorsports	Pontiac	Hylton Motorsports
50	Ted Musgrave	RaDiUs Motorsports	Chevrolet	RaDiUs Motorsports
51	Jeff Purvis	Phoenix Racing	Chevrolet	Plasti-Kote
52	Jimmy Means	Jimmy Means Racing	Pontiac	Alka-Seltzer
57	Jim Bown	Osterlund Racing	Pontiac	Heinz
66	Dick Trickle	Cale Yarborough Motorsports	Pontiac	Phillips 66 TropArtic
70	J. D. McDuffie	McDuffie Racing	Pontiac	McDuffie Racing
71	Dave Marcis	Marcis Auto Racing	Chevrolet	Big Apple Market
72	Tracy Leslie	Parker Racing	Oldsmobile	Detroit Gasket
75	Rick Wilson	RahMoc Enterprises	Pontiac	Dinner Bell Foods
82	Mark Stahl	Stahl Racing	Ford	Hooters
93	Charlie Baker	Baker Racing	Buick	Baker Racing
94	Sterling Marlin	Hagan Racing	Oldsmobile	Sunoco
98	Rick Mast	Travis Carter Enterprises	Chevrolet	Banquet Foods

== Qualifying ==
Qualifying was split into two rounds. The first round was held on Thursday, October 18, at 2:30 PM EST. Each driver would have one lap to set a time. During the first round, the top 20 drivers in the round would be guaranteed a starting spot in the race. If a driver was not able to guarantee a spot in the first round, they had the option to scrub their time from the first round and try and run a faster lap time in a second round qualifying run, held on Friday, October 19, at 2:00 PM EST. As with the first round, each driver would have one lap to set a time. For this specific race, positions 21-40 would be decided on time, and depending on who needed it, a select amount of positions were given to cars who had not otherwise qualified but were high enough in owner's points; up to two were given.

Ken Schrader, driving for Hendrick Motorsports, would win the pole, setting a time of 24.769 and an average speed of 147.817 miles per hour (237.888 km/h) in the first round.

Four drivers would fail to qualify.

=== Full qualifying results ===
Pos.	#	Driver	Team	Make	Time	Speed
1	25	Ken Schrader	Hendrick Motorsports	Chevrolet	24.769	147.817
2	28	Davey Allison	Robert Yates Racing	Ford	24.880	147.154
3	7	Alan Kulwicki	AK Racing	Ford	24.909	146.983
4	33	Harry Gant	Leo Jackson Motorsports	Oldsmobile	25.003	146.430
5	9	Bill Elliott	Melling Racing	Ford	25.018	146.343
6	42	Kyle Petty	SABCO Racing	Pontiac	25.036	146.237
7	11	Geoff Bodine	Junior Johnson & Associates	Ford	25.057	146.115
8	98	Rick Mast	Travis Carter Enterprises	Chevrolet	25.064	146.074
9	4	Ernie Irvan	Morgan–McClure Motorsports	Chevrolet	25.069	146.045
10	21	Dale Jarrett	Wood Brothers Racing	Ford	25.098	145.876
11	5	Ricky Rudd	Hendrick Motorsports	Chevrolet	25.121	145.743
12	1	Terry Labonte	Precision Products Racing	Oldsmobile	25.154	145.551
13	12	Hut Stricklin	Bobby Allison Motorsports	Buick	25.174	145.436
14	66	Dick Trickle	Cale Yarborough Motorsports	Pontiac	25.176	145.424
15	10	Derrike Cope	Whitcomb Racing	Chevrolet	25.222	145.159
16	30	Michael Waltrip	Bahari Racing	Pontiac	25.247	145.015
17	75	Rick Wilson	RahMoc Enterprises	Pontiac	25.255	144.969
18	26	Brett Bodine	King Racing	Buick	25.265	144.912
19	27	Rusty Wallace	Blue Max Racing	Pontiac	25.266	144.906
20	3	Dale Earnhardt	Richard Childress Racing	Chevrolet	25.282	144.814
Failed to lock in Round 1
21	6	Mark Martin	Roush Racing	Ford	24.922	146.908
22	15	Morgan Shepherd	Bud Moore Engineering	Ford	24.935	146.830
23	20	Jimmy Hensley	Moroso Racing	Oldsmobile	25.154	145.551
24	51	Jeff Purvis	Phoenix Racing	Chevrolet	25.186	145.366
25	71	Dave Marcis	Marcis Auto Racing	Chevrolet	25.288	144.780
26	19	Chad Little	Little Racing	Ford	25.326	144.563
27	8	Bobby Hillin Jr.	Stavola Brothers Racing	Buick	25.410	144.085
28	17	Darrell Waltrip	Hendrick Motorsports	Chevrolet	25.425	144.000
29	94	Sterling Marlin	Hagan Racing	Oldsmobile	25.435	143.943
30	41	Larry Pearson	Larry Hedrick Motorsports	Chevrolet	25.448	143.870
31	47	Jack Pennington (R)	Close Racing	Oldsmobile	25.464	143.779
32	2	Rick Jeffrey	U.S. Racing	Chevrolet	25.487	143.650
33	13	Mike Skinner	Mansion Motorsports	Buick	25.527	143.425
34	40	Tommy Kendall	Reno Enterprises	Chevrolet	25.601	143.010
35	43	Richard Petty	Petty Enterprises	Pontiac	25.609	142.965
36	50	Ted Musgrave	RaDiUs Motorsports	Chevrolet	25.790	141.962
37	72	Tracy Leslie	Parker Racing	Oldsmobile	25.803	141.890
38	57	Jim Bown	Osterlund Racing	Pontiac	25.809	141.857
39	52	Jimmy Means	Jimmy Means Racing	Pontiac	25.868	141.534
40	93	Charlie Baker	Baker Racing	Buick	26.043	140.583
Failed to qualify
41	48	James Hylton	Hylton Motorsports	Pontiac	-*	-*
42	70	J. D. McDuffie	McDuffie Racing	Pontiac	-*	-*
43	0	Delma Cowart	H. L. Waters Racing	Ford	-*	-*
44	82	Mark Stahl	Stahl Racing	Ford	-*	-*
Official first round qualifying results
Official starting lineup

== Race results ==
Fin	St	#	Driver	Team	Make	Laps	Led	Status	Pts	Winnings
1	3	7	Alan Kulwicki	AK Racing	Ford	492	151	running	180	$53,300
2	5	9	Bill Elliott	Melling Racing	Ford	492	82	running	175	$40,775
3	4	33	Harry Gant	Leo Jackson Motorsports	Oldsmobile	492	0	running	165	$23,575
4	7	11	Geoff Bodine	Junior Johnson & Associates	Ford	492	4	running	165	$23,625
5	1	25	Ken Schrader	Hendrick Motorsports	Chevrolet	492	31	running	160	$26,025
6	29	94	Sterling Marlin	Hagan Racing	Oldsmobile	491	0	running	150	$12,882
7	11	5	Ricky Rudd	Hendrick Motorsports	Chevrolet	491	0	running	146	$10,925
8	28	17	Darrell Waltrip	Hendrick Motorsports	Chevrolet	491	3	running	147	$15,425
9	9	4	Ernie Irvan	Morgan–McClure Motorsports	Chevrolet	490	0	running	138	$10,325
10	20	3	Dale Earnhardt	Richard Childress Racing	Chevrolet	490	0	running	134	$19,750
11	21	6	Mark Martin	Roush Racing	Ford	490	0	running	130	$13,350
12	22	15	Morgan Shepherd	Bud Moore Engineering	Ford	490	0	running	127	$10,025
13	12	1	Terry Labonte	Precision Products Racing	Oldsmobile	490	0	running	124	$9,175
14	27	8	Bobby Hillin Jr.	Stavola Brothers Racing	Buick	490	0	running	121	$8,875
15	16	30	Michael Waltrip	Bahari Racing	Pontiac	489	0	running	118	$9,050
16	10	21	Dale Jarrett	Wood Brothers Racing	Ford	489	0	running	115	$8,525
17	18	26	Brett Bodine	King Racing	Buick	489	0	running	112	$10,825
18	17	75	Rick Wilson	RahMoc Enterprises	Pontiac	487	0	running	109	$7,475
19	30	41	Larry Pearson	Larry Hedrick Motorsports	Chevrolet	487	0	running	106	$4,275
20	6	42	Kyle Petty	SABCO Racing	Pontiac	485	207	running	113	$13,850
21	35	43	Richard Petty	Petty Enterprises	Pontiac	485	0	running	100	$5,350
22	8	98	Rick Mast	Travis Carter Enterprises	Chevrolet	484	0	running	97	$4,650
23	25	71	Dave Marcis	Marcis Auto Racing	Chevrolet	483	2	running	99	$6,950
24	31	47	Jack Pennington (R)	Close Racing	Oldsmobile	482	0	running	91	$4,400
25	26	19	Chad Little	Little Racing	Ford	479	0	running	88	$3,675
26	34	40	Tommy Kendall	Reno Enterprises	Chevrolet	477	0	running	85	$3,525
27	38	57	Jim Bown	Osterlund Racing	Pontiac	477	0	running	82	$4,175
28	39	52	Jimmy Means	Jimmy Means Racing	Pontiac	471	0	running	79	$4,100
29	2	28	Davey Allison	Robert Yates Racing	Ford	470	12	running	81	$14,700
30	32	2	Rick Jeffrey	U.S. Racing	Chevrolet	467	0	running	73	$5,300
31	23	20	Jimmy Hensley	Moroso Racing	Oldsmobile	452	0	running	70	$3,850
32	19	27	Rusty Wallace	Blue Max Racing	Pontiac	421	0	engine	67	$14,075
33	15	10	Derrike Cope	Whitcomb Racing	Chevrolet	268	0	valve	64	$7,975
34	13	12	Hut Stricklin	Bobby Allison Motorsports	Buick	236	0	engine	61	$4,050
35	33	13	Mike Skinner	Mansion Motorsports	Buick	230	0	rear end	58	$2,825
36	14	66	Dick Trickle	Cale Yarborough Motorsports	Pontiac	217	0	engine	55	$6,350
37	36	50	Ted Musgrave	RaDiUs Motorsports	Chevrolet	93	0	engine	52	$2,700
38	24	51	Jeff Purvis	Phoenix Racing	Chevrolet	75	0	engine	49	$2,690
39	37	72	Tracy Leslie	Parker Racing	Oldsmobile	67	0	engine	46	$2,650
40	40	93	Charlie Baker	Baker Racing	Buick	35	0	engine	43	$2,600
Failed to qualify
41		48	James Hylton	Hylton Motorsports	Pontiac					
42		70	J. D. McDuffie	McDuffie Racing	Pontiac					
43		0	Delma Cowart	H. L. Waters Racing	Ford					
44		82	Mark Stahl	Stahl Racing	Ford					
Official race results

== Standings after the race ==
Drivers' Championship standings

Pos	Driver	Points
1	Mark Martin	4,120
2	Dale Earnhardt	4,075 (-45)
3	Bill Elliott	3,716 (-404)
4	Geoff Bodine	3,700 (–420)
5	Rusty Wallace	3,479 (–641)
6	Kyle Petty	3,421 (–694)
7	Ricky Rudd	3,419 (–701)
8	Morgan Shepherd	3,344 (–776)
9	Ernie Irvan	3,309 (–811)
10	Alan Kulwicki	3,302 (–818)
Official driver's standings

- Note: Only the first 10 positions are included for the driver standings.

Previous race: 1990 Mello Yello 500	NASCAR Winston Cup Series; 1990 season	Next race: 1990 Checker 500
