= 1990 Mello Yello 500 =

26th race of the 1990 NASCAR Winston Cup Series

Race details
- Race 26 of 29 in the 1990 NASCAR Winston Cup Series
- The 1990 Mello Yello 500 program cover, featuring Mark Martin and Dale Earnhardt. Artwork by NASCAR artist Sam Bass.
- Date: October 7, 1990
- Official name: 31st Annual Mello Yello 500
- Location: Concord, North Carolina, Charlotte Motor Speedway
- Course: Permanent racing facility
- Course length: 1.5 miles (2.41 km)
- Distance: 334 laps, 501 mi (806.281 km)
- Scheduled distance: 334 laps, 501 mi (806.281 km)
- Average speed: 137.428 miles per hour (221.169 km/h)
- Attendance: 158,400

Pole position
Driver	Brett Bodine	King Racing
- Time: 30.966

Most laps led
Driver	Bill Elliott	Melling Racing
- Laps: 243

Winner
No. 28	Davey Allison	Robert Yates Racing

Television in the United States
- Network: TBS
- Announcers: Ken Squier, Johnny Hayes, Chris Economaki

Radio in the United States
- Radio: Performance Racing Network

The 1990 Mello Yello 500 was the 26th stock car race of the 1990 NASCAR Winston Cup Series season and the 31st iteration of the event. The race was held on Sunday, October 7, 1990, before an audience of 158,400 in Concord, North Carolina, at Charlotte Motor Speedway, a 1.5 miles (2.4 km) permanent quad-oval. The race took the scheduled 334 laps to complete. Taking advantage of a misfortunate Bill Elliott, Robert Yates Racing driver Davey Allison would manage to dominate the final 76 laps of the race to take his eighth career NASCAR Winston Cup Series victory and his second and final victory of the season. To fill out the top three, Bud Moore Engineering driver Morgan Shepherd and Bahari Racing driver Michael Waltrip would finish second and third, respectively.

With a poor finish from championship contender Dale Earnhardt, Mark Martin managed to increase his driver championship points lead by 33 points, to a total of 49 points.

== Background ==
The layout of Charlotte Motor Speedway, the venue where the race was held.

Charlotte Motor Speedway is a motorsports complex located in Concord, North Carolina, United States 13 miles from Charlotte, North Carolina. The complex features a 1.5 miles (2.4 km) quad oval track that hosts NASCAR racing including the prestigious Coca-Cola 600 on Memorial Day weekend and the NEXTEL All-Star Challenge, as well as the UAW-GM Quality 500. The speedway was built in 1959 by Bruton Smith and is considered the home track for NASCAR with many race teams located in the Charlotte area. The track is owned and operated by Speedway Motorsports Inc. (SMI) with Marcus Smith (son of Bruton Smith) as track president.

=== Entry list ===
- (R) denotes rookie driver.

#	Driver	Team	Make
0	Delma Cowart	H. L. Waters Racing	Ford
1	Terry Labonte	Precision Products Racing	Oldsmobile
01	Mickey Gibbs	Gibbs Racing	Ford
3	Dale Earnhardt	Richard Childress Racing	Chevrolet
4	Ernie Irvan	Morgan–McClure Motorsports	Oldsmobile
04	Bill Meacham	Meacham Racing	Oldsmobile
5	Ricky Rudd	Hendrick Motorsports	Chevrolet
6	Mark Martin	Roush Racing	Ford
7	Alan Kulwicki	AK Racing	Ford
8	Bobby Hillin Jr.	Stavola Brothers Racing	Buick
9	Bill Elliott	Melling Racing	Ford
10	Derrike Cope	Whitcomb Racing	Chevrolet
11	Geoff Bodine	Junior Johnson & Associates	Ford
12	Hut Stricklin	Bobby Allison Motorsports	Buick
13	Mike Skinner	Mansion Motorsports	Chevrolet
15	Morgan Shepherd	Bud Moore Engineering	Ford
17	Darrell Waltrip	Hendrick Motorsports	Chevrolet
19	Chad Little	Little Racing	Ford
20	Jimmy Hensley	Moroso Racing	Oldsmobile
21	Dale Jarrett	Wood Brothers Racing	Ford
23	Eddie Bierschwale	B&B Racing	Oldsmobile
25	Ken Schrader	Hendrick Motorsports	Chevrolet
26	Brett Bodine	King Racing	Buick
27	Rusty Wallace	Blue Max Racing	Pontiac
28	Davey Allison	Robert Yates Racing	Ford
30	Michael Waltrip	Bahari Racing	Pontiac
33	Harry Gant	Leo Jackson Motorsports	Oldsmobile
36	H. B. Bailey	Bailey Racing	Pontiac
41	Larry Pearson	Larry Hedrick Motorsports	Chevrolet
42	Kyle Petty	SABCO Racing	Pontiac
43	Richard Petty	Petty Enterprises	Pontiac
44	Jimmy Horton	Group 44	Pontiac
47	Jack Pennington (R)	Close Racing	Oldsmobile
52	Jimmy Means	Jimmy Means Racing	Pontiac
57	Jimmy Spencer	Osterlund Racing	Pontiac
64	Gary Wright	White Racing	Chevrolet
65	Dave Mader III	Bahre Racing	Pontiac
66	Dick Trickle	Cale Yarborough Motorsports	Pontiac
68	Bobby Hamilton	TriStar Motorsports	Pontiac
71	Dave Marcis	Marcis Auto Racing	Chevrolet
74	Mike Potter	Wawak Racing	Pontiac
75	Rick Wilson	RahMoc Enterprises	Pontiac
82	Mark Stahl	Stahl Racing	Ford
83	Phil Parsons	Speed Racing	Oldsmobile
89	Rodney Combs	Mueller Brothers Racing	Pontiac
90	Buddy Baker	Donlavey Racing	Ford
91	Ed Cooper	Ed Cooper Racing	Oldsmobile
94	Sterling Marlin	Hagan Racing	Oldsmobile
97	Chuck Bown	Tex Racing	Chevrolet
98	Rick Mast	Travis Carter Enterprises	Chevrolet

== Qualifying ==
Qualifying was originally scheduled to be split into two rounds. The first round was held on Wednesday, October 3, at 2:00 PM EST. Originally, the first 20 positions were going to be determined by first round qualifying, with positions 21-40 meant to be determined the following day on Thursday, October 4. However, due to rain, the second round was cancelled. As a result, the rest of the starting lineup was set using the results from the first round. Depending on who needed it, a select amount of positions were given to cars who had not otherwise qualified but were high enough in owner's points; up to two were given.

Brett Bodine, driving for King Racing, would win the pole, setting a time of 30.966 and an average speed of 174.385 miles per hour (280.645 km/h) in the first round.

Nine drivers would fail to qualify.

=== Full qualifying results ===
Pos.	#	Driver	Team	Make	Time	Speed
1	26	Brett Bodine	King Racing	Buick	30.966	174.385
2	33	Harry Gant	Leo Jackson Motorsports	Oldsmobile	31.114	173.555
3	4	Ernie Irvan	Morgan–McClure Motorsports	Chevrolet	31.232	172.900
4	25	Ken Schrader	Hendrick Motorsports	Chevrolet	31.240	172.855
5	28	Davey Allison	Robert Yates Racing	Ford	31.254	172.778
6	6	Mark Martin	Roush Racing	Ford	31.280	172.634
7	11	Geoff Bodine	Junior Johnson & Associates	Ford	31.282	172.623
8	66	Dick Trickle	Cale Yarborough Motorsports	Pontiac	31.405	171.947
9	9	Bill Elliott	Melling Racing	Ford	31.424	171.843
10	12	Hut Stricklin	Bobby Allison Motorsports	Buick	31.429	171.816
11	21	Dale Jarrett	Wood Brothers Racing	Ford	31.459	171.652
12	27	Rusty Wallace	Blue Max Racing	Pontiac	31.515	171.347
13	10	Derrike Cope	Whitcomb Racing	Chevrolet	31.550	171.157
14	75	Rick Wilson	RahMoc Enterprises	Pontiac	31.557	171.119
15	3	Dale Earnhardt	Richard Childress Racing	Chevrolet	31.587	170.956
16	5	Ricky Rudd	Hendrick Motorsports	Chevrolet	31.590	170.940
17	47	Jack Pennington (R)	Close Racing	Oldsmobile	31.597	170.902
18	43	Richard Petty	Petty Enterprises	Pontiac	31.615	170.805
19	1	Terry Labonte	Precision Products Racing	Oldsmobile	31.619	170.783
20	42	Kyle Petty	SABCO Racing	Pontiac	31.625	170.751
21	94	Sterling Marlin	Hagan Racing	Oldsmobile	31.687	170.417
22	41	Larry Pearson	Larry Hedrick Motorsports	Chevrolet	31.704	170.326
23	20	Jimmy Hensley	Moroso Racing	Oldsmobile	31.787	169.881
24	01	Mickey Gibbs	Gibbs Racing	Ford	31.787	169.881
25	17	Darrell Waltrip	Hendrick Motorsports	Chevrolet	31.791	169.859
26	90	Buddy Baker	Donlavey Racing	Ford	31.823	169.689
27	98	Rick Mast	Travis Carter Enterprises	Chevrolet	31.826	169.673
28	68	Bobby Hamilton	TriStar Motorsports	Pontiac	31.841	169.593
29	83	Phil Parsons	Speed Racing	Oldsmobile	31.931	169.115
30	44	Jimmy Horton	Group 44	Pontiac	31.939	169.072
31	19	Chad Little	Little Racing	Ford	31.975	168.882
32	97	Chuck Bown	Tex Racing	Chevrolet	31.995	168.776
33	15	Morgan Shepherd	Bud Moore Engineering	Ford	32.004	168.729
34	57	Jimmy Spencer	Osterlund Racing	Pontiac	32.015	168.671
35	52	Jimmy Means	Jimmy Means Racing	Pontiac	32.025	168.618
36	30	Michael Waltrip	Bahari Racing	Pontiac	32.035	168.566
37	23	Eddie Bierschwale	B&B Racing	Oldsmobile	32.062	168.424
38	8	Bobby Hillin Jr.	Stavola Brothers Racing	Buick	32.092	168.266
39	71	Dave Marcis	Marcis Auto Racing	Chevrolet	32.219	167.603
40	82	Mark Stahl	Stahl Racing	Ford	32.530	166.001
Provisional
41	7	Alan Kulwicki	AK Racing	Ford	-	-
Failed to qualify
42	65	Dave Mader III	Bahre Racing	Pontiac	32.536	165.970
43	89	Rodney Combs	Mueller Brothers Racing	Pontiac	32.582	165.736
44	13	Mike Skinner	Mansion Motorsports	Chevrolet	32.587	165.710
45	64	Gary Wright	White Racing	Chevrolet	32.660	165.340
46	74	Mike Potter	Wawak Racing	Pontiac	-	-
47	36	H. B. Bailey	Bailey Racing	Pontiac	-	-
48	0	Delma Cowart	H. L. Waters Racing	Ford	-	-
49	04	Bill Meacham	Meacham Racing	Oldsmobile	-	-
50	91	Ed Cooper	Ed Cooper Racing	Oldsmobile	-	-
Official first round qualifying results
Official starting lineup

== Race results ==
Fin	St	#	Driver	Team	Make	Laps	Led	Status	Pts	Winnings
1	5	28	Davey Allison	Robert Yates Racing	Ford	334	57	running	180	$90,650
2	33	15	Morgan Shepherd	Bud Moore Engineering	Ford	334	2	running	175	$51,800
3	36	30	Michael Waltrip	Bahari Racing	Pontiac	334	13	running	170	$38,100
4	20	42	Kyle Petty	SABCO Racing	Pontiac	334	3	running	165	$30,450
5	41	7	Alan Kulwicki	AK Racing	Ford	334	0	running	155	$24,757
6	16	5	Ricky Rudd	Hendrick Motorsports	Chevrolet	334	0	running	150	$18,425
7	13	10	Derrike Cope	Whitcomb Racing	Chevrolet	334	0	running	146	$17,400
8	1	26	Brett Bodine	King Racing	Buick	334	4	running	147	$35,600
9	25	17	Darrell Waltrip	Hendrick Motorsports	Chevrolet	334	1	running	143	$18,900
10	11	21	Dale Jarrett	Wood Brothers Racing	Ford	333	0	running	134	$14,625
11	14	75	Rick Wilson	RahMoc Enterprises	Pontiac	333	0	running	130	$11,350
12	17	47	Jack Pennington (R)	Close Racing	Oldsmobile	333	0	running	127	$7,650
13	39	71	Dave Marcis	Marcis Auto Racing	Chevrolet	331	0	running	124	$10,800
14	6	6	Mark Martin	Roush Racing	Ford	331	0	running	121	$13,600
15	9	9	Bill Elliott	Melling Racing	Ford	331	243	running	128	$59,150
16	21	94	Sterling Marlin	Hagan Racing	Oldsmobile	330	0	running	115	$7,925
17	19	1	Terry Labonte	Precision Products Racing	Oldsmobile	330	0	running	112	$7,475
18	29	83	Phil Parsons	Speed Racing	Oldsmobile	330	0	running	0	$4,225
19	22	41	Larry Pearson	Larry Hedrick Motorsports	Chevrolet	329	0	running	106	$4,075
20	18	43	Richard Petty	Petty Enterprises	Pontiac	329	0	running	103	$5,425
21	24	01	Mickey Gibbs	Gibbs Racing	Ford	324	0	running	100	$3,775
22	37	23	Eddie Bierschwale	B&B Racing	Oldsmobile	323	0	running	97	$3,650
23	30	44	Jimmy Horton	Group 44	Pontiac	323	0	running	94	$3,525
24	32	97	Chuck Bown	Tex Racing	Chevrolet	322	0	running	91	$3,450
25	15	3	Dale Earnhardt	Richard Childress Racing	Chevrolet	320	0	running	88	$12,275
26	2	33	Harry Gant	Leo Jackson Motorsports	Oldsmobile	303	1	engine	90	$15,500
27	3	4	Ernie Irvan	Morgan–McClure Motorsports	Chevrolet	286	7	running	87	$11,200
28	28	68	Bobby Hamilton	TriStar Motorsports	Pontiac	277	0	running	79	$3,200
29	10	12	Hut Stricklin	Bobby Allison Motorsports	Buick	251	0	engine	76	$4,300
30	8	66	Dick Trickle	Cale Yarborough Motorsports	Pontiac	245	0	accident	73	$7,100
31	38	8	Bobby Hillin Jr.	Stavola Brothers Racing	Buick	244	0	accident	70	$5,750
32	40	82	Mark Stahl	Stahl Racing	Ford	244	0	running	67	$3,000
33	23	20	Jimmy Hensley	Moroso Racing	Oldsmobile	240	0	carburetor	0	$3,625
34	27	98	Rick Mast	Travis Carter Enterprises	Chevrolet	235	0	valve	61	$3,550
35	4	25	Ken Schrader	Hendrick Motorsports	Chevrolet	205	0	running	58	$12,365
36	7	11	Geoff Bodine	Junior Johnson & Associates	Ford	183	3	camshaft	60	$12,285
37	26	90	Buddy Baker	Donlavey Racing	Ford	169	0	rear end	52	$2,810
38	12	27	Rusty Wallace	Blue Max Racing	Pontiac	133	0	engine	49	$11,995
39	35	52	Jimmy Means	Jimmy Means Racing	Pontiac	126	0	overheating	46	$3,410
40	31	19	Chad Little	Little Racing	Ford	98	0	accident	43	$2,775
41	34	57	Jimmy Spencer	Osterlund Racing	Pontiac	97	0	accident	40	$3,375
Official race results

== Standings after the race ==
Drivers' Championship standings

	Pos	Driver	Points
	1	Mark Martin	3,990
	2	Dale Earnhardt	3,941 (-49)
1	3	Bill Elliott	3,541 (-449)
1	4	Geoff Bodine	3,535 (–455)
	5	Rusty Wallace	3,412 (–578)
	6	Kyle Petty	3,308 (–682)
	7	Ricky Rudd	3,273 (–717)
2	8	Morgan Shepherd	3,217 (–773)
1	9	Ernie Irvan	3,171 (–819)
1	10	Alan Kulwicki	3,122 (–868)
Official driver's standings

- Note: Only the first 10 positions are included for the driver standings.

Previous race: 1990 Tyson Holly Farms 400	NASCAR Winston Cup Series; 1990 season	Next race: 1990 AC Delco 500
