= 1990 Miller Genuine Draft 400 (Richmond) =

22nd race of the 1990 NASCAR Winston Cup Series

Race details
- Race 22 of 29 in the 1990 NASCAR Winston Cup Series
- The 1990 Miller Genuine Draft 400 program cover, featuring Rusty Wallace. Artwork by NASCAR artist Sam Bass.
- Date: September 9, 1990
- Official name: 33rd Annual Miller Genuine Draft 400
- Location: Richmond, Virginia, Richmond International Raceway
- Course: Permanent racing facility
- Course length: 0.75 miles (1.21 km)
- Distance: 400 laps, 300 mi (482.803 km)
- Average speed: 95.567 miles per hour (153.800 km/h)

Pole position
Driver	Ernie Irvan	Morgan-McClure Motorsports
- Time: 22.524

Most laps led
Driver	Dale Earnhardt	Richard Childress Racing
- Laps: 173

Winner
No. 3	Dale Earnhardt	Richard Childress Racing

Television in the United States
- Network: TBS
- Announcers: Ken Squier, Johnny Hayes, Chris Economaki

Radio in the United States
- Radio: Motor Racing Network

The 1990 Miller Genuine Draft 400 was the 22nd stock car race of the 1990 NASCAR Winston Cup Series season and the 33rd iteration of the event. The race was held on Sunday, September 9, 1990, in Richmond, Virginia, at Richmond International Raceway, a 0.75 miles (1.21 km) D-shaped oval. The race took the scheduled 400 laps to complete. Gambling on fuel strategy, Richard Childress Racing driver Dale Earnhardt would manage to defend the field in a final three-lap restart to the finish to take his 47th career NASCAR Winston Cup Series victory and his eighth victory of the season. To fill out the top three, Roush Racing driver Mark Martin and Hendrick Motorsports driver Darrell Waltrip would finish second and third, respectively.

== Background ==
The layout of Richmond International Raceway, the venue where the race was at.

Richmond International Raceway (RIR) is a 3/4-mile (1.2 km), D-shaped, asphalt race track located just outside Richmond, Virginia in Henrico County. It hosts the Monster Energy NASCAR Cup Series and Xfinity Series. Known as "America's premier short track", it formerly hosted a NASCAR Camping World Truck Series race, an IndyCar Series race, and two USAC sprint car races.

=== Entry list ===
- (R) denotes rookie driver.

#	Driver	Team	Make
1	Terry Labonte	Precision Products Racing	Oldsmobile
01	Mickey Gibbs	Gibbs Racing	Ford
2	D. K. Ulrich	U.S. Racing	Pontiac
3	Dale Earnhardt	Richard Childress Racing	Chevrolet
4	Ernie Irvan	Morgan–McClure Motorsports	Oldsmobile
5	Ricky Rudd	Hendrick Motorsports	Chevrolet
6	Mark Martin	Roush Racing	Ford
7	Alan Kulwicki	AK Racing	Ford
8	Bobby Hillin Jr.	Stavola Brothers Racing	Buick
9	Bill Elliott	Melling Racing	Ford
10	Derrike Cope	Whitcomb Racing	Chevrolet
11	Geoff Bodine	Junior Johnson & Associates	Ford
12	Hut Stricklin	Bobby Allison Motorsports	Buick
13	Kerry Teague	Linro Motorsports	Buick
15	Morgan Shepherd	Bud Moore Engineering	Ford
17	Darrell Waltrip	Hendrick Motorsports	Chevrolet
18	Greg Sacks	Hendrick Motorsports	Chevrolet
19	Chad Little	Little Racing	Ford
20	Rob Moroso (R)	Moroso Racing	Oldsmobile
21	Dale Jarrett	Wood Brothers Racing	Ford
25	Ken Schrader	Hendrick Motorsports	Chevrolet
26	Brett Bodine	King Racing	Buick
27	Rusty Wallace	Blue Max Racing	Pontiac
28	Davey Allison	Robert Yates Racing	Ford
30	Michael Waltrip	Bahari Racing	Pontiac
33	Harry Gant	Leo Jackson Motorsports	Oldsmobile
42	Kyle Petty	SABCO Racing	Pontiac
43	Richard Petty	Petty Enterprises	Pontiac
52	Jimmy Means	Jimmy Means Racing	Pontiac
56	Ron Esau	Reno Enterprises	Chevrolet
57	Jimmy Spencer	Osterlund Racing	Pontiac
66	Dick Trickle	Cale Yarborough Motorsports	Pontiac
70	J. D. McDuffie	McDuffie Racing	Pontiac
71	Dave Marcis	Marcis Auto Racing	Chevrolet
75	Rick Wilson	RahMoc Enterprises	Pontiac
90	Charlie Glotzbach	Donlavey Racing	Ford
94	Sterling Marlin	Hagan Racing	Oldsmobile
98	Butch Miller	Travis Carter Enterprises	Chevrolet

== Qualifying ==
Qualifying was split into two rounds. The first round was held on Friday, September 7, at 3:00 PM EST. Each driver would have one lap to set a time. During the first round, the top 20 drivers in the round would be guaranteed a starting spot in the race. If a driver was not able to guarantee a spot in the first round, they had the option to scrub their time from the first round and try and run a faster lap time in a second round qualifying run, held on Saturday, September 8, at 11:00 AM EST. As with the first round, each driver would have one lap to set a time. For this specific race, positions 21-34 would be decided on time, and depending on who needed it, a select amount of positions were given to cars who had not otherwise qualified but were high enough in owner's points; up to two were given.

Ernie Irvan, driving for Morgan–McClure Motorsports, would win the pole, setting a time of 22.524 and an average speed of 119.872 miles per hour (192.915 km/h) in the first round. Two drivers would fail to qualify.

=== Full qualifying results ===
Pos.	#	Driver	Team	Make	Time	Speed
1	4	Ernie Irvan	Morgan–McClure Motorsports	Chevrolet	22.524	119.872
2	30	Michael Waltrip	Bahari Racing	Pontiac	22.548	119.745
3	25	Ken Schrader	Hendrick Motorsports	Chevrolet	22.577	119.591
4	7	Alan Kulwicki	AK Racing	Ford	22.590	119.522
5	66	Dick Trickle	Cale Yarborough Motorsports	Pontiac	22.600	119.469
6	3	Dale Earnhardt	Richard Childress Racing	Chevrolet	22.612	119.406
7	6	Mark Martin	Roush Racing	Ford	22.636	119.279
8	28	Davey Allison	Robert Yates Racing	Ford	22.637	119.274
9	42	Kyle Petty	SABCO Racing	Pontiac	22.689	119.000
10	11	Geoff Bodine	Junior Johnson & Associates	Ford	22.728	118.796
11	27	Rusty Wallace	Blue Max Racing	Pontiac	22.735	118.760
12	1	Terry Labonte	Precision Products Racing	Oldsmobile	22.741	118.728
13	21	Dale Jarrett	Wood Brothers Racing	Ford	22.794	118.452
14	5	Ricky Rudd	Hendrick Motorsports	Chevrolet	22.814	118.348
15	26	Brett Bodine	King Racing	Buick	22.817	118.333
16	9	Bill Elliott	Melling Racing	Ford	22.839	118.219
17	94	Sterling Marlin	Hagan Racing	Oldsmobile	22.853	118.146
18	15	Morgan Shepherd	Bud Moore Engineering	Ford	22.871	118.053
19	75	Rick Wilson	RahMoc Enterprises	Oldsmobile	22.875	118.033
20	10	Derrike Cope	Whitcomb Racing	Chevrolet	22.900	117.904
Failed to lock in Round 1
21	19	Chad Little	Little Racing	Ford	22.925	117.775
22	33	Harry Gant	Leo Jackson Motorsports	Oldsmobile	22.948	117.657
23	71	Dave Marcis	Marcis Auto Racing	Chevrolet	22.993	117.427
24	52	Jimmy Means	Jimmy Means Racing	Pontiac	23.019	117.294
25	57	Jimmy Spencer	Osterlund Racing	Pontiac	23.050	117.137
26	43	Richard Petty	Petty Enterprises	Pontiac	23.066	117.055
27	17	Darrell Waltrip	Hendrick Motorsports	Chevrolet	23.068	117.045
28	01	Mickey Gibbs	Gibbs Racing	Ford	23.093	116.919
29	18	Greg Sacks	Hendrick Motorsports	Chevrolet	23.100	116.883
30	8	Bobby Hillin Jr.	Stavola Brothers Racing	Buick	23.138	116.691
31	12	Hut Stricklin	Bobby Allison Motorsports	Buick	23.299	115.885
32	90	Charlie Glotzbach	Donlavey Racing	Ford	23.323	115.766
33	56	Ron Esau	Reno Enterprises	Chevrolet	23.379	115.488
34	98	Butch Miller	Travis Carter Enterprises	Chevrolet	23.395	115.409
Provisionals
35	20	Rob Moroso (R)	Moroso Racing	Oldsmobile	24.159	111.760
36	2	D. K. Ulrich	U.S. Racing	Pontiac	-	-
Failed to qualify
37	70	J. D. McDuffie	McDuffie Racing	Pontiac	-*	-*
38	13	Kerry Teague	Linro Motorsports	Buick	-*	-*
Official first round qualifying results
Official starting lineup

== Race results ==
Fin	St	#	Driver	Team	Make	Laps	Led	Status	Pts	Winnings
1	6	3	Dale Earnhardt	Richard Childress Racing	Chevrolet	400	173	running	185	$59,225
2	7	6	Mark Martin	Roush Racing	Ford	400	31	running	175	$30,550
3	27	17	Darrell Waltrip	Hendrick Motorsports	Chevrolet	400	0	running	165	$25,107
4	16	9	Bill Elliott	Melling Racing	Ford	400	0	running	160	$16,950
5	11	27	Rusty Wallace	Blue Max Racing	Pontiac	400	75	running	160	$19,525
6	9	42	Kyle Petty	SABCO Racing	Pontiac	400	0	running	150	$11,875
7	5	66	Dick Trickle	Cale Yarborough Motorsports	Pontiac	400	0	running	146	$9,900
8	14	5	Ricky Rudd	Hendrick Motorsports	Chevrolet	399	0	running	142	$8,350
9	10	11	Geoff Bodine	Junior Johnson & Associates	Ford	399	0	running	138	$10,850
10	3	25	Ken Schrader	Hendrick Motorsports	Chevrolet	399	22	running	139	$15,930
11	30	8	Bobby Hillin Jr.	Stavola Brothers Racing	Buick	399	0	running	130	$7,450
12	1	4	Ernie Irvan	Morgan–McClure Motorsports	Chevrolet	399	33	running	132	$13,875
13	31	12	Hut Stricklin	Bobby Allison Motorsports	Buick	399	0	running	124	$5,350
14	2	30	Michael Waltrip	Bahari Racing	Pontiac	398	0	running	121	$6,725
15	23	71	Dave Marcis	Marcis Auto Racing	Chevrolet	397	0	running	118	$6,975
16	8	28	Davey Allison	Robert Yates Racing	Ford	396	0	running	115	$9,550
17	12	1	Terry Labonte	Precision Products Racing	Oldsmobile	396	0	running	112	$6,100
18	24	52	Jimmy Means	Jimmy Means Racing	Pontiac	396	0	running	109	$4,450
19	34	98	Butch Miller	Travis Carter Enterprises	Chevrolet	395	0	running	106	$4,225
20	19	75	Rick Wilson	RahMoc Enterprises	Oldsmobile	394	0	running	103	$6,325
21	26	43	Richard Petty	Petty Enterprises	Pontiac	394	0	running	100	$4,075
22	32	90	Charlie Glotzbach	Donlavey Racing	Ford	394	0	running	0	$3,100
23	29	18	Greg Sacks	Hendrick Motorsports	Chevrolet	384	0	running	94	$3,075
24	17	94	Sterling Marlin	Hagan Racing	Oldsmobile	383	0	running	91	$5,225
25	33	56	Ron Esau	Reno Enterprises	Chevrolet	383	0	running	88	$3,050
26	4	7	Alan Kulwicki	AK Racing	Ford	354	66	running	90	$5,905
27	25	57	Jimmy Spencer	Osterlund Racing	Pontiac	318	0	running	82	$5,055
28	35	20	Rob Moroso (R)	Moroso Racing	Oldsmobile	273	0	accident	79	$4,225
29	13	21	Dale Jarrett	Wood Brothers Racing	Ford	272	0	accident	76	$4,355
30	18	15	Morgan Shepherd	Bud Moore Engineering	Ford	270	0	engine	73	$5,100
31	15	26	Brett Bodine	King Racing	Buick	242	0	accident	70	$4,310
32	21	19	Chad Little	Little Racing	Ford	239	0	accident	67	$3,480
33	36	2	D. K. Ulrich	U.S. Racing	Pontiac	185	0	engine	64	$4,265
34	28	01	Mickey Gibbs	Gibbs Racing	Ford	160	0	accident	61	$2,805
35	20	10	Derrike Cope	Whitcomb Racing	Chevrolet	120	0	engine	58	$7,355
36	22	33	Harry Gant	Leo Jackson Motorsports	Oldsmobile	12	0	engine	55	$8,855
Official race results

== Standings after the race ==
Drivers' Championship standings

	Pos	Driver	Points
	1	Mark Martin	3,344
	2	Dale Earnhardt	3,328 (-16)
	3	Geoff Bodine	3,120 (-224)
	4	Rusty Wallace	2,952 (–392)
	5	Bill Elliott	2,921 (–423)
1	6	Ricky Rudd	2,837 (–507)
1	7	Morgan Shepherd	2,768 (–576)
	8	Kyle Petty	2,734 (–610)
1	9	Ken Schrader	2,719 (–625)
1	10	Ernie Irvan	2,673 (–671)
Official driver's standings

- Note: Only the first 10 positions are included for the driver standings.

Previous race: 1990 Heinz Southern 500	NASCAR Winston Cup Series; 1990 season	Next race: 1990 Peak Antifreeze 500
