= 1990 Tyson Holly Farms 400 =

25th race of the 1990 NASCAR Winston Cup Series

Race details
- Race 25 of 29 in the 1990 NASCAR Winston Cup Series
- The 1990 Tyson Holly Farms 400 program cover, featuring Geoff Bodine.
- Date: September 30, 1990
- Official name: 41st Annual Tyson Holly Farms 400
- Location: North Wilkesboro Speedway, North Wilkesboro, North Carolina
- Course: Permanent racing facility
- Course length: 0.625 miles (1.006 km)
- Distance: 400 laps, 250 mi (402.336 km)
- Scheduled distance: 400 laps, 250 mi (402.336 km)
- Average speed: 93.818 miles per hour (150.985 km/h)
- Attendance: 39,000

Pole position
Driver	Kyle Petty	SABCO Racing
- Time: 19.332

Most laps led
Driver	Dale Earnhardt	Richard Childress Racing
- Laps: 291

Winner
No. 6	Mark Martin	Roush Racing

Television in the United States
- Network: ESPN
- Announcers: Bob Jenkins, Ned Jarrett, Benny Parsons

Radio in the United States
- Radio: Motor Racing Network

The 1990 Tyson Holly Farms 400 was the 25th stock car race of the 1990 NASCAR Winston Cup Series season and the 41st iteration of the event. The race was held on Sunday, September 30, 1990, before an audience of 39,000 in North Wilkesboro, North Carolina at the North Wilkesboro Speedway, a 0.625 miles (1.006 km) oval short track. The race took the scheduled 400 laps to complete. In the final laps of the race, Roush Racing driver Mark Martin would manage to mount a late-race charge to maintain his driver's championship lead over second-place finisher and driver in the driver's championship, Richard Childress Racing driver Dale Earnhardt. The victory was Martin's fourth career NASCAR Winston Cup Series victory and third and final victory of the season.

Hours after the race, 1990 NASCAR Rookie of the Year contender Rob Moroso was killed in a drunk-driving crash, with Moroso speeding into another car at around 75 miles per hour (121 km/h) according to The Charlotte Observer, killing Moroso and nursing assistant Tammy Williams. Moroso's blood alcohol content at the time of the crash was found to be over twice the North Carolina legal limit of 0.1, with Moroso's BAC coming in as a 0.22.

== Background ==
The layout of North Wilkesboro Speedway, the venue where the race was held

North Wilkesboro Speedway is a short oval racetrack located on U.S. Route 421, about five miles east of the town of North Wilkesboro, North Carolina, or 80 miles north of Charlotte. It measures 0.625 mi (1.006 km) and features a unique uphill backstretch and downhill frontstretch. It has previously held races in NASCAR's top three series, including 93 Winston Cup Series races. The track, a NASCAR original, operated from 1949, NASCAR's inception, until the track's original closure in 1996. The speedway briefly reopened in 2010 and hosted several stock car series races before closing again in the spring of 2011. It was re-opened in August 2022 for grassroots racing.

=== Entry list ===
- (R) denotes rookie driver.

#	Driver	Team	Make
1	Terry Labonte	Precision Products Racing	Oldsmobile
2	Ron Esau	U.S. Racing	Pontiac
3	Dale Earnhardt	Richard Childress Racing	Chevrolet
4	Ernie Irvan	Morgan–McClure Motorsports	Oldsmobile
5	Ricky Rudd	Hendrick Motorsports	Chevrolet
6	Mark Martin	Roush Racing	Ford
7	Alan Kulwicki	AK Racing	Ford
8	Bobby Hillin Jr.	Stavola Brothers Racing	Buick
9	Bill Elliott	Melling Racing	Ford
10	Derrike Cope	Whitcomb Racing	Chevrolet
11	Geoff Bodine	Junior Johnson & Associates	Ford
12	Hut Stricklin	Bobby Allison Motorsports	Buick
15	Morgan Shepherd	Bud Moore Engineering	Ford
17	Darrell Waltrip	Hendrick Motorsports	Chevrolet
19	Chad Little	Little Racing	Ford
20	Rob Moroso (R)	Moroso Racing	Oldsmobile
21	Dale Jarrett	Wood Brothers Racing	Ford
25	Ken Schrader	Hendrick Motorsports	Chevrolet
26	Brett Bodine	King Racing	Buick
27	Rusty Wallace	Blue Max Racing	Pontiac
28	Davey Allison	Robert Yates Racing	Ford
30	Michael Waltrip	Bahari Racing	Pontiac
33	Harry Gant	Leo Jackson Motorsports	Oldsmobile
40	Tommy Kendall	Reno Enterprises	Chevrolet
41	Larry Pearson	Larry Hedrick Motorsports	Chevrolet
42	Kyle Petty	SABCO Racing	Pontiac
43	Richard Petty	Petty Enterprises	Pontiac
47	Jack Pennington (R)	Close Racing	Oldsmobile
51	Jeff Purvis	Phoenix Racing	Chevrolet
52	Jimmy Means	Jimmy Means Racing	Pontiac
57	Jimmy Spencer	Osterlund Racing	Pontiac
66	Dick Trickle	Cale Yarborough Motorsports	Pontiac
70	J. D. McDuffie	McDuffie Racing	Pontiac
71	Dave Marcis	Marcis Auto Racing	Chevrolet
75	Rick Wilson	RahMoc Enterprises	Pontiac
94	Sterling Marlin	Hagan Racing	Oldsmobile
98	Rick Mast	Travis Carter Enterprises	Chevrolet

== Qualifying ==
Qualifying was split into two rounds. The first round was held on Friday, September 28, at 3:00 PM EST. Each driver would have one lap to set a time. During the first round, the top ten drivers in the round would be guaranteed a starting spot in the race. If a driver was not able to guarantee a spot in the first round, they had the option to scrub their time from the first round and try and run a faster lap time in a second round qualifying run, held on Saturday, September 29, at 12:00 PM EST. As with the first round, each driver would have one lap to set a time. For this specific race, positions 11-30 would be decided on time, and depending on who needed it, a select amount of positions were given to cars who had not otherwise qualified but were high enough in owner's points; up to two were given.

Kyle Petty, driving for SABCO Racing, would win the pole, setting a time of 19.332 and an average speed of 116.387 miles per hour (187.307 km/h) in the first round.

Five drivers would fail to qualify.

=== Full qualifying results ===
Pos.	#	Driver	Team	Make	Time	Speed
1	42	Kyle Petty	SABCO Racing	Pontiac	19.332	116.387
2	6	Mark Martin	Roush Racing	Ford	19.372	116.147
3	94	Sterling Marlin	Hagan Racing	Oldsmobile	19.389	116.045
4	21	Dale Jarrett	Wood Brothers Racing	Ford	19.416	115.884
5	1	Terry Labonte	Precision Products Racing	Oldsmobile	19.417	115.878
6	7	Alan Kulwicki	AK Racing	Ford	19.428	115.812
7	9	Bill Elliott	Melling Racing	Ford	19.434	115.776
8	3	Dale Earnhardt	Richard Childress Racing	Chevrolet	19.468	115.574
9	25	Ken Schrader	Hendrick Motorsports	Chevrolet	19.472	115.551
10	30	Michael Waltrip	Bahari Racing	Pontiac	19.473	115.545
Failed to lock in Round 1
11	17	Darrell Waltrip	Hendrick Motorsports	Chevrolet	19.477	115.521
12	26	Brett Bodine	King Racing	Buick	19.488	115.456
13	28	Davey Allison	Robert Yates Racing	Ford	19.516	115.290
14	71	Dave Marcis	Marcis Auto Racing	Chevrolet	19.523	115.249
15	5	Ricky Rudd	Hendrick Motorsports	Chevrolet	19.530	115.207
16	27	Rusty Wallace	Blue Max Racing	Pontiac	19.531	115.201
17	33	Harry Gant	Leo Jackson Motorsports	Oldsmobile	19.541	115.143
18	8	Bobby Hillin Jr.	Stavola Brothers Racing	Buick	19.558	115.042
19	11	Geoff Bodine	Junior Johnson & Associates	Ford	19.577	114.931
20	98	Rick Mast	Travis Carter Enterprises	Chevrolet	19.577	114.931
21	66	Dick Trickle	Cale Yarborough Motorsports	Pontiac	19.582	114.901
22	75	Rick Wilson	RahMoc Enterprises	Oldsmobile	19.587	114.872
23	4	Ernie Irvan	Morgan–McClure Motorsports	Oldsmobile	19.602	114.784
24	51	Jeff Purvis	Phoenix Racing	Chevrolet	19.626	114.644
25	10	Derrike Cope	Whitcomb Racing	Chevrolet	19.642	114.550
26	15	Morgan Shepherd	Bud Moore Engineering	Ford	19.653	114.486
27	12	Hut Stricklin	Bobby Allison Motorsports	Buick	19.677	114.347
28	43	Richard Petty	Petty Enterprises	Pontiac	19.697	114.231
29	19	Chad Little	Little Racing	Ford	19.742	113.970
30	52	Jimmy Means	Jimmy Means Racing	Pontiac	19.751	113.918
Provisionals
31	57	Jimmy Spencer	Osterlund Racing	Pontiac	19.776	113.774
32	20	Rob Moroso (R)	Moroso Racing	Oldsmobile	19.773	113.792
Failed to qualify
33	41	Larry Pearson	Larry Hedrick Motorsports	Chevrolet	-*	-*
34	70	J. D. McDuffie	McDuffie Racing	Pontiac	-*	-*
35	40	Tommy Kendall	Reno Enterprises	Chevrolet	-*	-*
36	2	Ron Esau	U.S. Racing	Pontiac	-*	-*
37	47	Jack Pennington (R)	Close Racing	Oldsmobile	-*	-*
Official first round qualifying results
Official starting lineup

== Race results ==
Fin	St	#	Driver	Team	Make	Laps	Led	Status	Pts	Winnings
1	2	6	Mark Martin	Roush Racing	Ford	400	39	running	180	$52,875
2	8	3	Dale Earnhardt	Richard Childress Racing	Chevrolet	400	291	running	180	$32,075
3	12	26	Brett Bodine	King Racing	Buick	400	0	running	165	$18,750
4	7	9	Bill Elliott	Melling Racing	Ford	400	0	running	160	$16,775
5	9	25	Ken Schrader	Hendrick Motorsports	Chevrolet	400	6	running	160	$15,325
6	23	4	Ernie Irvan	Morgan–McClure Motorsports	Oldsmobile	400	0	running	150	$10,007
7	11	17	Darrell Waltrip	Hendrick Motorsports	Chevrolet	400	0	running	146	$14,125
8	16	27	Rusty Wallace	Blue Max Racing	Pontiac	400	0	running	142	$13,325
9	6	7	Alan Kulwicki	AK Racing	Ford	400	0	running	138	$7,125
10	1	42	Kyle Petty	SABCO Racing	Pontiac	399	64	running	139	$18,025
11	15	5	Ricky Rudd	Hendrick Motorsports	Chevrolet	399	0	running	130	$6,650
12	26	15	Morgan Shepherd	Bud Moore Engineering	Ford	399	0	running	127	$6,350
13	3	94	Sterling Marlin	Hagan Racing	Oldsmobile	399	0	running	124	$6,075
14	18	8	Bobby Hillin Jr.	Stavola Brothers Racing	Buick	399	0	running	121	$5,875
15	10	30	Michael Waltrip	Bahari Racing	Pontiac	398	0	running	118	$6,350
16	19	11	Geoff Bodine	Junior Johnson & Associates	Ford	398	0	running	115	$9,950
17	28	43	Richard Petty	Petty Enterprises	Pontiac	397	0	running	112	$4,025
18	22	75	Rick Wilson	RahMoc Enterprises	Oldsmobile	396	0	running	109	$5,300
19	4	21	Dale Jarrett	Wood Brothers Racing	Ford	396	0	running	106	$5,150
20	27	12	Hut Stricklin	Bobby Allison Motorsports	Buick	395	0	running	103	$4,325
21	32	20	Rob Moroso (R)	Moroso Racing	Oldsmobile	394	0	running	100	$4,200
22	25	10	Derrike Cope	Whitcomb Racing	Chevrolet	393	0	running	97	$6,900
23	31	57	Jimmy Spencer	Osterlund Racing	Pontiac	390	0	running	94	$4,750
24	29	19	Chad Little	Little Racing	Ford	390	0	running	91	$2,600
25	14	71	Dave Marcis	Marcis Auto Racing	Chevrolet	383	0	running	88	$4,775
26	13	28	Davey Allison	Robert Yates Racing	Ford	383	0	running	85	$9,200
27	5	1	Terry Labonte	Precision Products Racing	Oldsmobile	334	0	running	82	$5,350
28	17	33	Harry Gant	Leo Jackson Motorsports	Oldsmobile	327	0	running	79	$8,150
29	21	66	Dick Trickle	Cale Yarborough Motorsports	Pontiac	194	0	accident	76	$5,025
30	30	52	Jimmy Means	Jimmy Means Racing	Pontiac	128	0	rocker arm	73	$2,375
31	24	51	Jeff Purvis	Phoenix Racing	Chevrolet	100	0	brakes	70	$2,375
32	20	98	Rick Mast	Travis Carter Enterprises	Chevrolet	17	0	accident	67	$2,375
Official race results

== Standings after the race ==
Drivers' Championship standings

	Pos	Driver	Points
	1	Mark Martin	3,869
	2	Dale Earnhardt	3,853 (-16)
	3	Geoff Bodine	3,475 (-394)
	4	Bill Elliott	3,413 (–465)
	5	Rusty Wallace	3,363 (–506)
	6	Kyle Petty	3,143 (–726)
	7	Ricky Rudd	3,123 (–746)
	8	Ernie Irvan	3,084 (–785)
1	9	Ken Schrader	3,054 (–815)
1	10	Morgan Shepherd	3,042 (–827)
Official driver's standings

- Note: Only the first 10 positions are included for the driver standings.

Previous race: 1990 Goody's 500	NASCAR Winston Cup Series; 1990 season	Next race: 1990 Mello Yello 500
