= Terry Fisher (racing driver) =

American racing driver (born 1962)

- Born: May 24, 1962 (age 64); Sandy, Oregon, U.S.

NASCAR Cup Series career
- 4 races run over 4 years
- Best finish: 67th (1995)
- First race: 1989 Banquet Frozen Foods 300 (Sonoma)
- Last race: 1995 Save Mart Supermarkets 300 (Sonoma)
Wins	Top tens	Poles
0	0	0

NASCAR FedEx Freight Truck Series career
- 5 races run over 3 years
- Best finish: 59th (1998)
- First race: 1998 Tempus Resorts 300K (Pikes Peak)
- Last race: 2001 Silverado 350 (Texas)
Wins	Top tens	Poles
0	0	0

ARCA Menards Series West career
- 24 races run over 11 years
- Best finish: 4th (1990)
- First race: 1986 Motorcraft 300 (Portland)
- Last race: 2009 Bi-Mart Salute to the Troops 125 (Portland)
Wins	Top tens	Poles
0	11	0
- Statistics up to date as of March 31, 2025.

Terry Fisher (born May 24, 1962) is an American former professional stock car racing driver. He competed in the NASCAR Winston Cup Series, NASCAR Craftsman Truck Series, and NASCAR Winston West Series, as well as the NASCAR Southwest Series and NASCAR Northwest Series.

== Racing career ==
=== NASCAR Winston Cup Series ===
Fisher competed in four NASCAR Winston Cup Series races between 1989 and 1995, as well as failing to qualify for two others. He scored a best finish of fifteenth, coming at Sears Point in the 1990 Banquet Frozen Foods 300. He competed in the 1990 NASCAR Christmas 400 at the Calder Park Thunderdome in Australia, finishing fourth.

=== NASCAR Craftsman Truck Series ===
Fisher competed in five NASCAR Craftsman Truck Series races between 1998 and 2001, as well as failing to qualify for two others. He scored a best finish of twentieth at Texas in 1999.

=== NASCAR Winston West Series ===
Fisher competed in 24 races in what is now the ARCA Menards Series West between 1986 and 2009. He only ran one full time season, and two races in to the 1990 season found himself in the points lead. He was able to attempt the full season, although he failed to start in the race at Mesa Marin and failed to qualify for the race at Phoenix, ultimately finishing 4th in the final standings. For the rest of his time in the series, he only competed in one or two races a year, the final coming at Portland International Raceway in 2009.

=== NASCAR Southwest Series ===
Fisher competed in 5 NASCAR Southwest Series races between 1986 and 1987, as well as failing to qualify for another in 1993. He scored a best finish of 9th, coming at Riverside International Raceway in 1987.

=== NASCAR Northwest Series ===
Fisher competed in seven NASCAR Northwest Series races between 1986 and 1988, scoring a best finish of sixth at Tri-City Raceway in 1986.

=== Other racing ===
Fisher participated in a Bendix Trans-Am Championship race at Portland International Raceway in 1987, finishing 27th due to fatigue. He also won the NASCAR Advance Auto Parts Weekly Series, then NASCAR Winston Series, track championship at Portland Speedway in 1985, winning six races and finishing in the top-ten in fourteen of his fifteen starts. He participated in the 1990 NASCAR Australian Exhibition at the Calder Park Thunderdome, finishing fourth.

== Motorsports career results ==
=== NASCAR ===
(key) (Bold – Pole position awarded by qualifying time. Italics – Pole position earned by points standings or practice time. * – Most laps led.)

==== Winston Cup Series ====
NASCAR Winston Cup Series results
Year	Team	No.	Make	1	2	3	4	5	6	7	8	9	10	11	12	13	14	15	16	17	18	19	20	21	22	23	24	25	26	27	28	29	30	31	NWCC	Pts	Ref
1989	Midgley Racing	09	Chevy	DAY	CAR	ATL	RCH	DAR	BRI	NWS	MAR	TAL	CLT	DOV	SON; 25	POC	MCH	DAY	POC	TAL	GLN	MCH	BRI	DAR	RCH	DOV	MAR	CLT	NWS	CAR	PHO	ATL			79th	84	
1990	Midgley Racing	09	Pontiac	DAY	RCH	CAR	ATL	DAR	BRI	NWS	MAR	TAL	CLT	DOV	SON; 15	POC	MCH	DAY	POC	TAL	GLN	MCH	BRI	DAR	RCH	DOV	MAR	NWS	CLT	CAR					72nd	118	
1990	Midgley Racing	09	Olds																												PHO; DNQ	ATL			72nd	118	
1993	Marcis Auto Racing	71	Pontiac	DAY	CAR	RCH	ATL	DAR	BRI	NWS	MAR	TAL	SON	CLT	DOV	POC	MCH	DAY	NHA	POC	TAL	GLN	MCH	BRI	DAR	RCH	DOV	MAR	NWS	CLT	CAR	PHO; 37	ATL		83rd	52	
1995	Terry Fisher	09	Pontiac	DAY	CAR	RCH	ATL	DAR	BRI	NWS	MAR	TAL	SON; 38	CLT	DOV	POC	MCH	DAY	NHA	POC	TAL	IND	GLN	MCH	BRI	DAR	RCH								67th	49	
1995	RaDiUs Motorsports	67	Ford																									DOV; DNQ	MAR	NWS	CLT	CAR	PHO	ATL	67th	49	

==== Craftsman Truck Series ====
NASCAR Craftsman Truck Series results
Year	Team	No.	Make	1	2	3	4	5	6	7	8	9	10	11	12	13	14	15	16	17	18	19	20	21	22	23	24	25	26	27	NCTC	Pts	Ref
1998	Mike Farris	41	Chevy	WDW	HOM	PHO	POR	EVG	I70	GLN	TEX	BRI	MLW; DNQ	NZH	CAL	PPR; 32	IRP	NHA	FLM	NSV	HPT	LVL	RCH; DNQ	MEM	GTY	MAR	SON; 24	MMR	PHO	LVS	59th	235	
1999	Mike Farris	41	Dodge	HOM	PHO	EVG	MMR	MAR	MEM	PPR; 21	I70	BRI	TEX; 20	PIR	GLN	MLW	NSV	NZH	MCH	NHA	IRP	GTY	HPT	RCH	LVS	LVL	TEX	CAL			65th	203	
2001	Richardson Motorsports	0	Chevy	DAY	HOM	MMR	MAR	GTY	DAR	PPR	DOV	TEX	MEM	MLW	KAN	KEN	NHA	IRP	NSH	CIC	NZH	RCH	SBO	TEX; 34	LVS	PHO	CAL				111th	61	

==== Camping World West Series ====
NASCAR Camping World West Series results
Year	Team	No.	Make	1	2	3	4	5	6	7	8	9	10	11	12	13	14	15	NCWWC	Pts	Ref
1986	Unknown	57	Buick	SON	RSD	EVG	RCS	TAC	PIR; 19	WSR	RSD								43rd	32	
1987	Unknown	57	Buick	SON	RSD	SGP; 11	EVG	POR; 14	TAC; 11	MMR	RSD								24th	118	
1989	Midgley Racing	09	Pontiac	MAD	MMR; 6	RAS		POR; 8	TCR	EVG	MMR	SGS							17th	591	
1989	Midgley Racing	09	Chevy				SON; 25						SON 10	PHO					17th	591	
1990	Midgley Racing	09	Chevy	MMR; 3		SGS; 8	POR; 11												4th	1205	
1990	Midgley Racing	09	Pontiac		SON; 15			EVG; 5	RAS; 7	TCR; 4									4th	1205	
1990	Midgley Racing	09	Olds								MMR; 24	PHO; DNQ							4th	1205	
1991	Midgley Racing	09	Pontiac	EVG; 5	MMR	SON	SGS	POR; 10	EVG	SSS	MMR	PHO							30th	294	
1992	Unknown	57	Pontiac	MMR	SGS	SON	SHA	POR; 3	EVG	SSS	CAJ	TWS	MMR	PHO					35th	165	
1993	Unknown	57	Pontiac	TWS	MMR	SGS	SON	TUS	SHA	EVG	POR; 14	CBS	SSS	CAJ	TCR	MMR			31st	286	
1993	Marcis Auto Racing	71	Pontiac														PHO; 37		31st	286	
1994	Unknown	57	Pontiac	MMR	TUS	SON	SGS	YAK	MMR	POR; 14	IND	CAJ	TCR	LVS	MMR	PHO	TUS		49th	121	
1995	Terry Fisher	09	Pontiac	TUS	MMR	SON; 38	CNS	MMR	POR	SGS	TUS	AMP	MAD	POR	LVS	SON	MMR	PHO	40th	170	
1996	Terry Fisher	09		TUS; 12	AMP	MMR	SON	MAD	POR	TUS	EVG	CNS	MAD	MMR	SON	MMR	PHO	LVS	57th	127	
2009	Midgley Racing	09	Chevy	CTS	AAS	PHO	MAD	IOW	DCS	SON	IRW	PIR; 21	MMP	CNS	IOW	AAS			66th	100	
