= 1995 Save Mart Supermarkets 300 =

Tenth race of the 1995 NASCAR Winston Cup Series

Race details
- Race 10 of 31 in the 1995 NASCAR Winston Cup Series
- The 1995 Save Mart Supermarkets 300 program cover, featuring Ken Schrader and Mark Martin.
- Date: May 7, 1995
- Official name: 7th Annual Save Mart Supermarkets 300
- Location: Sonoma, California, Sears Point Raceway
- Course: Permanent racing facility
- Course length: 2.52 miles (4.06 km)
- Distance: 74 laps, 186.48 mi (300.11 km)
- Scheduled distance: 74 laps, 186.48 mi (300.11 km)
- Average speed: 70.681 miles per hour (113.750 km/h)

Pole position
Driver	Ricky Rudd	Rudd Performance Motorsports
- Time: 1:38.467

Most laps led
Driver	Mark Martin	Roush Racing
- Laps: 66

Winner
No. 3	Dale Earnhardt	Richard Childress Racing

Television in the United States
- Network: ESPN
- Announcers: Bob Jenkins, Ned Jarrett, Benny Parsons

Radio in the United States
- Radio: Motor Racing Network

The 1995 Save Mart Supermarkets 300 was the tenth stock car race of the 1995 NASCAR Winston Cup Series, the third race of the 1995 NASCAR Winston West Series, and the seventh iteration of the event. The race was held on Sunday, May 7, 1995, at the Grand Prix layout of Sears Point Raceway, a 2.52 miles (4.06 km) permanent road course layout. The race took the scheduled 74 laps to complete. In the final laps of the race, Richard Childress Racing driver Dale Earnhardt would manage to make a late-race pass on the leader with two laps to go to take his 65th career NASCAR Winston Cup Series victory, his second victory of the season, and his only career road course victory. To fill out the top three, Roush Racing driver Mark Martin and Hendrick Motorsports driver Jeff Gordon would finish second and third, respectively.

== Background ==
The layout of Sears Point Raceway used by NASCAR at the time.

Sears Point Raceway is one of two road courses to hold NASCAR races, the other being Watkins Glen International. The standard road course at Sears Point Raceway is a 12-turn course that is 2.52 miles (4.06 km) long; the track was modified in 1998, adding the Chute, which bypassed turns 5 and 6, shortening the course to 1.95 miles (3.14 km). The Chute was only used for NASCAR events such as this race, and was criticized by many drivers, who preferred the full layout. In 2001, it was replaced with a 70-degree turn, 4A, bringing the track to its current dimensions of 1.99 miles (3.20 km).

=== Entry list ===
- (R) denotes rookie driver.

#	Driver	Team	Make
00W	Scott Gaylord	Oliver Racing	Ford
1	Rick Mast	Precision Products Racing	Pontiac
2	Rusty Wallace	Penske Racing South	Ford
3	Dale Earnhardt	Richard Childress Racing	Chevrolet
4	Sterling Marlin	Morgan–McClure Motorsports	Chevrolet
5	Terry Labonte	Hendrick Motorsports	Chevrolet
6	Mark Martin	Roush Racing	Ford
7	Geoff Bodine	Geoff Bodine Racing	Ford
07	Doug George	Olson Technology Racing	Ford
8	Jeff Burton	Stavola Brothers Racing	Ford
9	Lake Speed	Melling Racing	Ford
09	Terry Fisher	Fisher Racing	Pontiac
10	Ricky Rudd	Rudd Performance Motorsports	Ford
11	Brett Bodine	Junior Johnson & Associates	Ford
12	Derrike Cope	Bobby Allison Motorsports	Ford
15	Dick Trickle	Bud Moore Engineering	Ford
16	Ted Musgrave	Roush Racing	Ford
17	Darrell Waltrip	Darrell Waltrip Motorsports	Chevrolet
18	Bobby Labonte	Joe Gibbs Racing	Chevrolet
19	Ernie Cope	Lew Miller Racing	Chevrolet
21	Morgan Shepherd	Wood Brothers Racing	Ford
22	Randy LaJoie (R)	Bill Davis Racing	Pontiac
22W	St. James Davis	St. James Racing	Pontiac
23	Jimmy Spencer	Haas-Carter Motorsports	Ford
24	Jeff Gordon	Hendrick Motorsports	Chevrolet
25	Ken Schrader	Hendrick Motorsports	Chevrolet
26	Hut Stricklin	King Racing	Ford
27	Elton Sawyer	Junior Johnson & Associates	Ford
28	Dale Jarrett	Robert Yates Racing	Ford
29	Steve Grissom	Diamond Ridge Motorsports	Chevrolet
30	Michael Waltrip	Bahari Racing	Pontiac
31	Ward Burton	A.G. Dillard Motorsports	Chevrolet
33	Robert Pressley (R)	Leo Jackson Motorsports	Chevrolet
37	John Andretti	Kranefuss-Haas Racing	Ford
38	Butch Gilliland	Stroppe Motorsports	Ford
40	Greg Sacks	Dick Brooks Racing	Pontiac
41	Ricky Craven (R)	Larry Hedrick Motorsports	Chevrolet
42	Kyle Petty	Team SABCO	Pontiac
43	Bobby Hamilton	Petty Enterprises	Pontiac
45	Wally Dallenbach Jr.	Strauser Racing	Chevrolet
64	Garrett Evans	White Racing	Chevrolet
71	Dave Marcis	Marcis Auto Racing	Chevrolet
72	Dan Obrist	Obrist Racing	Chevrolet
75	Todd Bodine	Butch Mock Motorsports	Ford
77	Davy Jones (R)	Jasper Motorsports	Ford
87	Joe Nemechek	NEMCO Motorsports	Chevrolet
90	Mike Wallace	Donlavey Racing	Ford
90W	Joe Heath	Heath Racing	Ford
91	Ken Pedersen	Kenny Shaw Racing	Ford
94	Bill Elliott	Elliott-Hardy Racing	Ford
98	Jeremy Mayfield	Cale Yarborough Motorsports	Ford

== Qualifying ==
Qualifying was split into two rounds. The first round was held on Friday, May 5, at 6:30 PM EST. Each driver would have one lap to set a time. During the first round, the top 25 drivers in the round would be guaranteed a starting spot in the race. If a driver was not able to guarantee a spot in the first round, they had the option to scrub their time from the first round and try and run a faster lap time in a second round qualifying run, held on Saturday, May 6, at 1:00 PM EST. As with the first round, each driver would have one lap to set a time. For this specific race, positions 26-37 would be decided on time, and four spots would be determined by NASCAR Winston Cup Series provisionals, while two more additional provisionals would be given to teams in the Winston West Series.

Ricky Rudd, driving for Rudd Performance Motorsports, won the pole, setting a time of 1:38.467 and an average speed of 92.132 miles per hour (148.272 km/h) in the first round.

Eight drivers would fail to qualify.

=== Full qualifying results ===
Pos.	#	Driver	Team	Make	Time	Speed
1	10	Ricky Rudd	Rudd Performance Motorsports	Ford	1:38.467	92.132
2	5	Terry Labonte	Hendrick Motorsports	Chevrolet	1:38.697	91.918
3	6	Mark Martin	Roush Racing	Ford	1:38.918	91.712
4	3	Dale Earnhardt	Richard Childress Racing	Chevrolet	1:39.052	91.588
5	24	Jeff Gordon	Hendrick Motorsports	Chevrolet	1:39.168	91.481
6	2	Rusty Wallace	Penske Racing South	Ford	1:39.208	91.444
7	25	Ken Schrader	Hendrick Motorsports	Chevrolet	1:39.221	91.432
8	42	Kyle Petty	Team SABCO	Pontiac	1:39.408	91.260
9	28	Dale Jarrett	Robert Yates Racing	Ford	1:39.499	91.177
10	90	Mike Wallace	Donlavey Racing	Ford	1:39.581	91.102
11	7	Geoff Bodine	Geoff Bodine Racing	Ford	1:39.713	90.981
12	16	Ted Musgrave	Roush Racing	Ford	1:39.723	90.972
13	30	Michael Waltrip	Bahari Racing	Pontiac	1:39.838	90.867
14	31	Ward Burton	A.G. Dillard Motorsports	Chevrolet	1:39.847	90.859
15	12	Derrike Cope	Bobby Allison Motorsports	Ford	1:40.455	90.309
16	26	Hut Stricklin	King Racing	Ford	1:40.537	90.235
17	17	Darrell Waltrip	Darrell Waltrip Motorsports	Chevrolet	1:40.562	90.213
18	87	Joe Nemechek	NEMCO Motorsports	Chevrolet	1:40.700	90.089
19	94	Bill Elliott	Elliott-Hardy Racing	Ford	1:40.737	90.056
20	4	Sterling Marlin	Morgan–McClure Motorsports	Chevrolet	1:40.768	90.029
21	43	Bobby Hamilton	Petty Enterprises	Pontiac	1:40.769	90.028
22	9	Lake Speed	Melling Racing	Ford	1:40.785	90.013
23	8	Jeff Burton	Stavola Brothers Racing	Ford	1:40.804	89.996
24	77	Davy Jones (R)	Jasper Motorsports	Ford	1:40.904	89.907
25	37	John Andretti	Kranefuss-Haas Racing	Ford	1:40.980	89.840
Failed to lock in Round 1
26	75	Todd Bodine	Butch Mock Motorsports	Ford	1:39.850	90.856
27	21	Morgan Shepherd	Wood Brothers Racing	Ford	1:40.442	90.321
28	29	Steve Grissom	Diamond Ridge Motorsports	Chevrolet	1:40.545	90.228
29	33	Robert Pressley (R)	Leo Jackson Motorsports	Chevrolet	1:40.621	90.160
30	22	Randy LaJoie (R)	Bill Davis Racing	Pontiac	1:40.642	90.141
31	11	Brett Bodine	Junior Johnson & Associates	Ford	1:40.933	89.881
32	45	Wally Dallenbach Jr.	Strauser Racing	Chevrolet	1:41.010	89.813
33	38	Butch Gilliland	Stroppe Motorsports	Ford	1:41.085	89.746
34	23	Jimmy Spencer	Travis Carter Enterprises	Ford	1:41.104	89.729
35	91	Ken Pedersen	Kenny Shaw Racing	Ford	1:41.178	89.664
36	09	Terry Fisher	Fisher Racing	Pontiac	1:41.249	89.601
37	71	Dave Marcis	Marcis Auto Racing	Chevrolet	1:41.270	89.582
Winston Cup provisionals
38	18	Bobby Labonte	Joe Gibbs Racing	Chevrolet	-*	-*
39	1	Rick Mast	Precision Products Racing	Ford	-*	-*
40	15	Dick Trickle	Bud Moore Engineering	Ford	-*	-*
41	41	Ricky Craven (R)	Larry Hedrick Motorsports	Chevrolet	-*	-*
Winston West provisionals
42	07	Doug George	Olson Technology Racing	Ford	-*	-*
43	72	Dan Obrist	Obrist Racing	Chevrolet	-*	-*
Failed to qualify
44	40	Greg Sacks	Dick Brooks Racing	Pontiac	-*	-*
45	98	Jeremy Mayfield	Cale Yarborough Motorsports	Ford	-*	-*
46	27	Elton Sawyer	Junior Johnson & Associates	Ford	-*	-*
47	00W	Scott Gaylord	Oliver Racing	Ford	-*	-*
48	64	Garrett Evans	White Racing	Chevrolet	-*	-*
49	22W	St. James Davis	St. James Racing	Pontiac	-*	-*
50	19	Ernie Cope	Lew Miller Racing	Chevrolet	-*	-*
51	90W	Joe Heath	Heath Racing	Ford	-*	-*
Official first round qualifying results
Official starting lineup

== Race results ==
Fin	St	#	Driver	Team	Make	Laps	Led	Status	Pts	Winnings
1	4	3	Dale Earnhardt	Richard Childress Racing	Chevrolet	74	2	running	180	$74,860
2	3	6	Mark Martin	Roush Racing	Ford	74	66	running	180	$68,915
3	5	24	Jeff Gordon	Hendrick Motorsports	Chevrolet	74	0	running	165	$41,625
4	1	10	Ricky Rudd	Rudd Performance Motorsports	Ford	74	4	running	165	$39,870
5	2	5	Terry Labonte	Hendrick Motorsports	Chevrolet	74	0	running	155	$35,020
6	12	16	Ted Musgrave	Roush Racing	Ford	74	0	running	150	$26,420
7	20	4	Sterling Marlin	Morgan–McClure Motorsports	Chevrolet	74	0	running	146	$27,670
8	26	75	Todd Bodine	Butch Mock Motorsports	Ford	74	0	running	142	$24,470
9	7	25	Ken Schrader	Hendrick Motorsports	Chevrolet	74	2	running	143	$28,920
10	13	30	Michael Waltrip	Bahari Racing	Pontiac	74	0	running	134	$17,215
11	25	37	John Andretti	Kranefuss-Haas Racing	Ford	74	0	running	130	$12,405
12	15	12	Derrike Cope	Bobby Allison Motorsports	Ford	74	0	running	127	$16,305
13	38	18	Bobby Labonte	Joe Gibbs Racing	Chevrolet	74	0	running	124	$23,050
14	21	43	Bobby Hamilton	Petty Enterprises	Pontiac	74	0	running	121	$15,405
15	27	21	Morgan Shepherd	Wood Brothers Racing	Ford	74	0	running	118	$19,905
16	39	1	Rick Mast	Precision Products Racing	Ford	74	0	running	115	$19,455
17	34	23	Jimmy Spencer	Travis Carter Enterprises	Ford	74	0	running	112	14,280
18	23	8	Jeff Burton	Stavola Brothers Racing	Ford	74	0	running	109	$19,130
19	19	94	Bill Elliott	Elliott-Hardy Racing	Ford	74	0	running	106	$10,505
20	6	2	Rusty Wallace	Penske Racing South	Ford	74	0	running	103	$25,680
21	14	31	Ward Burton	A.G. Dillard Motorsports	Chevrolet	74	0	running	100	$10,380
22	11	7	Geoff Bodine	Geoff Bodine Racing	Ford	74	0	running	97	24,955
23	9	28	Dale Jarrett	Robert Yates Racing	Ford	74	0	running	94	24,730
24	40	15	Dick Trickle	Bud Moore Engineering	Ford	74	0	running	91	$18,760
25	41	41	Ricky Craven (R)	Larry Hedrick Motorsports	Chevrolet	74	0	running	88	$14,650
26	28	29	Steve Grissom	Diamond Ridge Motorsports	Chevrolet	74	0	running	85	$13,530
27	37	71	Dave Marcis	Marcis Auto Racing	Chevrolet	74	0	running	82	$10,205
28	8	42	Kyle Petty	Team SABCO	Pontiac	74	0	running	79	$18,330
29	31	11	Brett Bodine	Junior Johnson & Associates	Ford	74	0	running	76	$23,120
30	29	33	Robert Pressley (R)	Leo Jackson Motorsports	Chevrolet	73	0	running	73	$18,690
31	42	07	Doug George	Olson Technology Racing	Ford	73	0	running	70	$10,005
32	30	22	Randy LaJoie (R)	Bill Davis Racing	Pontiac	70	0	running	67	$17,955
33	16	26	Hut Stricklin	King Racing	Ford	68	0	running	64	$17,920
34	10	90	Mike Wallace	Donlavey Racing	Ford	65	0	rear end	61	$12,405
35	17	17	Darrell Waltrip	Darrell Waltrip Motorsports	Chevrolet	64	0	running	58	$14,880
36	24	77	Davy Jones (R)	Jasper Motorsports	Ford	60	0	crash	55	$9,865
37	18	87	Joe Nemechek	NEMCO Motorsports	Chevrolet	58	0	running	52	$9,760
38	36	09	Terry Fisher	Fisher Racing	Pontiac	57	0	running	49	$9,760
39	32	45	Wally Dallenbach Jr.	Strauser Racing	Chevrolet	41	0	suspension	46	$9,760
40	22	9	Lake Speed	Melling Racing	Ford	32	0	running	43	$9,760
41	35	91	Ken Pedersen	Kenny Shaw Racing	Ford	25	0	handling	40	$9,760
42	33	38	Butch Gilliland	Stroppe Motorsports	Ford	19	0	engine	37	$9,760
43	43	72	Dan Obrist	Obrist Racing	Chevrolet	7	0	ignition	34	$9,760
Official race results

Previous race: 1995 Winston Select 500	NASCAR Winston Cup Series; 1995 season	Next race: 1995 Coca-Cola 600

Previous race: 1995 California 200	NASCAR Winston West Series; 1995 season	Next race: 1995 Mistic Premium Beverages 200
