= 1995 NASCAR Winston West Series =

42nd season of the NASCAR Winston West Series

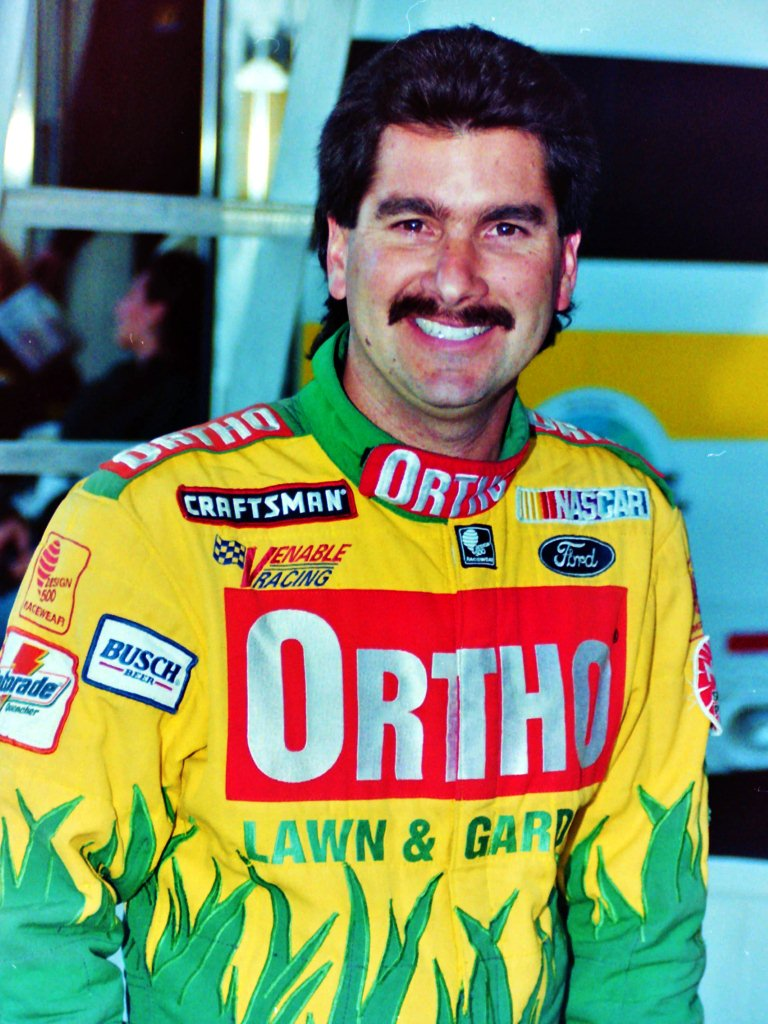
Doug George, the 1995 West Series champion.

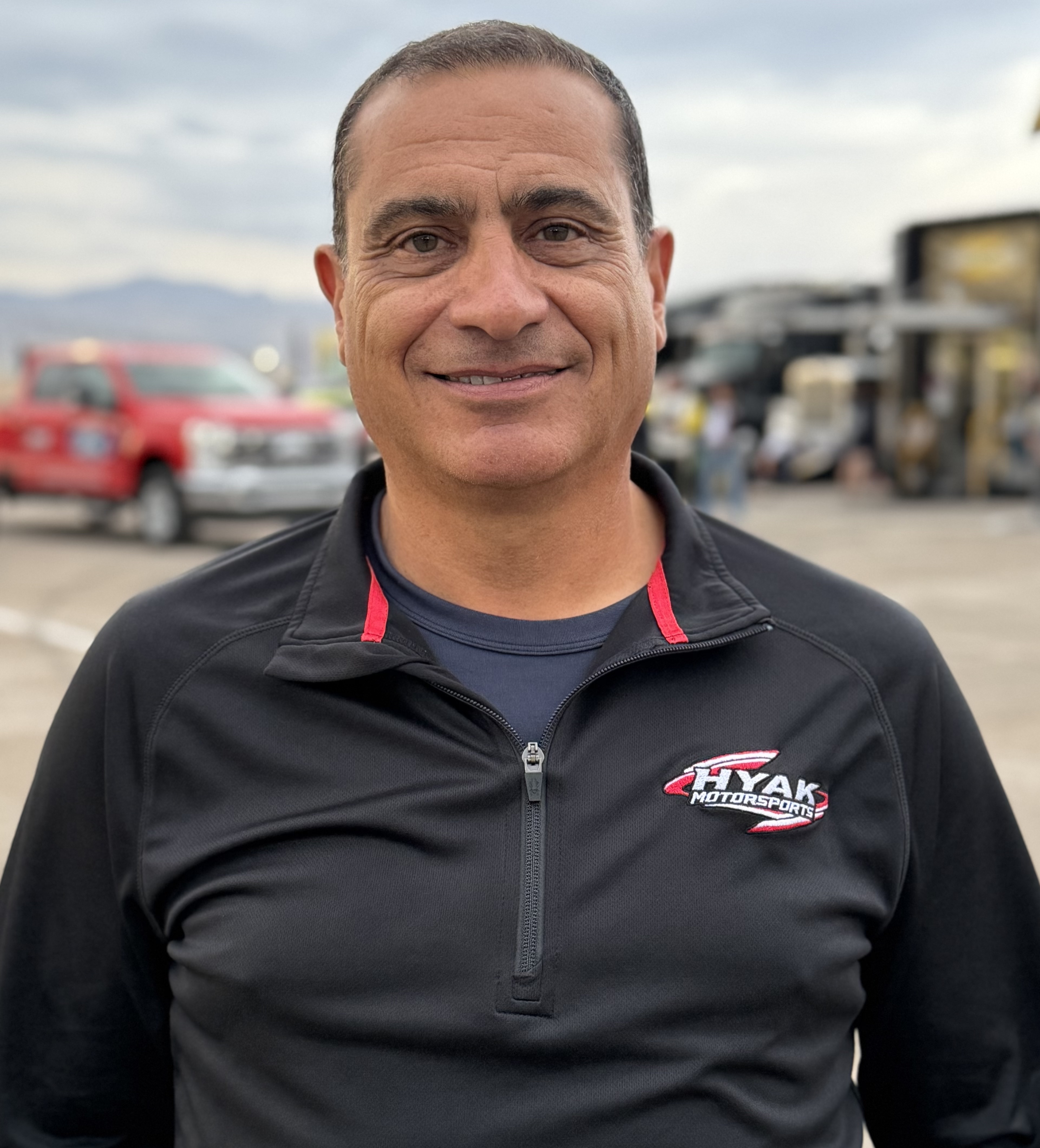
Ernie Cope finished second in the standings.

The 1995 NASCAR Winston West Series was the 42nd season of the series. The series returned to the Winston West Series branding after a year as the Winston Transcontinental Series. The title was won by Doug George, his first in the series.

== Schedule and results ==
The 1995 season included 15 individual races, although Mesa Marin Raceway hosted three races and Tucson Raceway Park, Sears Point Raceway, and Portland Speedway hosted two races each. The first race at Sonoma and the finale at Phoenix International Raceway were in combination with the NASCAR Winston Cup Series.

Date	Name	Racetrack	Location	Winner
January 22	Winter Heat 200	Tucson Raceway Park	Tucson, Arizona	Bill Sedgwick
April 23	California 200	Mesa Marin Raceway	Bakersfield, California	Bill Sedgwick
May 7	Save Mart Supermarkets 300	Sears Point Raceway	Sonoma, California	Dale Earnhardt
May 20	Mistic Premium Beverages 200	Colorado National Speedway	Erie, Colorado	Mike Chase
June 17	Carquest Auto Parts/AC Sparkplug 250	Mesa Marin Raceway	Bakersfield, California	Mike Chase
July 4	Reser's Fine Foods 200	Portland Speedway	Portland, Oregon	Ernie Cope
July 15	Valencia Dodge 200	Saugus Speedway	Saugus, California	Butch Gilliland
July 22	Valvoline/Checker 200	Tucson Raceway Park	Tucson, Arizona	Doug George
August 20	Fisco 200	Altamont Motorsports Park	Tracy, California	Doug George
September 2	Quick-N-Ez 200	Madera Speedway	Madera, California	Doug George
September 17	Plaid Pantry 250	Portland Speedway	Portland, Oregon	Doug George
September 23	Miller Genuine Draft 200	The Bullring at Las Vegas Motor Speedway	Las Vegas, Nevada	Ernie Cope
October 7	Sonoma 100	Sears Point Raceway	Sonoma, California	Doug George
October 14	Spears Manufacturing 300	Mesa Marin Raceway	Bakersfield, California	Doug George
October 29	Dura Lube 500	Phoenix International Raceway	Avondale, Arizona	Ricky Rudd

== Full Drivers' Championship ==
(key) Bold – Pole position awarded by time. Italics – Pole position set by owner's points. * – Most laps led. † – Ineligible for West Series points

Pos	Driver	TUS	MMR	SON	CNS	MMR	POR	SGS	TUS	AMP	MAD	POR	LVS	SON	MMR	PHO	Pts
1	Doug George	2	2	31	2	18	3	2	1	**1***	**1**	**1***	5	1	1	41	2295
2	Ernie Cope	16	5	DNQ	5	3*	1	**4**	9	4	5	2	1*	8	3	44	2143
3	Butch Gilliland	**3**	4	42	4	7	10	1*	**5**	6	2	5	10	2	18		2074
4	Dan Obrist	6	9	43	11	4	23	14	2*	3	8	4	3	6	8		1988
5	Rich Woodland Jr.	9	7		10	5	6	7	6	12	7	8	4	17	14	DNQ	1865
6	Scott Gaylord	14	3	DNQ	15	2	18	11	11	19	4	22	11	3	22	DNQ	1839
7	L.J. Pryor	18	14		8	15	13	16	7	11	6	9	7	16	11	DNQ	1730
8	Wayne Jacks	25	8			16	15	3	4	17	3*	19	**20**	14	7	DNQ	1726
9	Bill McAnally	19	25		13	12	21	5	10	9	13	12	6	19	9		1622
10	Garrett Evans	10	6	DNQ	**3**	19	5*	15	15			6	2				1433
11	Pappy Pryor	22	23		16	17	14	9	13	15	10	14	16		17		1401
12	Jack Sellers	8	19		9	20				18	11	13	19	18	19		1173
13	Pete Graham					9	8	8		8	9	15		12	13		1071
14	Mike Chase		11		1*	**1**	20	12	12	2							1027
15	Gary Collins				14	8	12		3		16		15		5		953
16	Chuck Welch	13	21		17	11				14	14		21				902
17	John Kinder	15	20		7	10	17		16						6		883
18	St. James Davis	21	26	DNQ	18	21	24	17	14								856
19	Tom Taylor	11	17		21	13				10	12	16					842
20	Lance Wade	4	12				2					7				DNQ	754
21	Joe Heath	24	22	DNQ	19			6		5			17				711
22	Rich DeLong Jr.	17	16		12	14		13							23		693
23	Kenny Smith	23	10					10					18		16		586
24	Pat D'Antonio										17	17	8	15	21		584
25	Bill Sedgwick	1	**1***												2*		545
26	Kevin Culver						7		7	15	18						519
27	Victor Mibelli		18							16				13	20		451
28	Billy Kann								8				9		15		398
29	Jody Tanner		13				9					10					396
30	Bobby Goodwin Jr.		27										14		24		388
31	Ron Hornaday Jr.	5*												**7***		27†	321
32	Joe Bean													5	12		282
33	Jerry Foyt													9	10		272
34	Larry Gaylord						11					11					260
35	Ron Jacks					6						20					253
36	Steve Sellers					22								10			231
37	Larry Gunselman											21	12				227
38	Bob Howard				20								13				227
39	John Sahm		24				16										206
40	Terry Fisher			38													170
41	Hershel McGriff											3					170
42	Ken Schrader			9†											**4**	10†	165
43	Ken Pedersen			41													165
44	Jim Bown						4										165
45	Dave Vegher													4			160
46	Rick Carelli				6												150
47	Ron Esau	7															146
48	Jim Inglebright													11			130
49	Steve Portenga	12															127
50	Barry Graham									13							124
51	Roger Mears Jr.		15														118
52	Rick Strauser						19										106
53	Rick Scribner	20															103
54	Ed Watson						22										97

== See also ==
- 1995 NASCAR Winston Cup Series
- 1995 NASCAR Busch Series
- 1995 NASCAR SuperTruck Series
- 1994–95 NASCAR SuperTruck Series exhibition races
