= 1995 UAW-GM Teamwork 500 =

13th race of the 1995 NASCAR Winston Cup Series

Race details
- Race 13 of 31 in the 1995 NASCAR Winston Cup Series
- The 1995 Pocono 500 program cover, featuring Rusty Wallace.
- Date: June 11, 1995
- Official name: 14th Annual UAW-GM Teamwork 500
- Location: Long Pond, Pennsylvania, Pocono Raceway
- Course: Permanent racing facility
- Course length: 2.5 miles (4.0 km)
- Distance: 200 laps, 500 mi (804.672 km)
- Scheduled distance: 200 laps, 500 mi (804.672 km)
- Average speed: 137.72 miles per hour (221.64 km/h)

Pole position
Driver	Ken Schrader	Hendrick Motorsports
- Time: 55.088

Most laps led
Driver	Jeff Gordon	Hendrick Motorsports
- Laps: 124

Winner
No. 5	Terry Labonte	Hendrick Motorsports

Television in the United States
- Network: TNN
- Announcers: Mike Joy, Buddy Baker, Dick Berggren

Radio in the United States
- Radio: Motor Racing Network

The 1995 UAW-GM Teamwork 500 was the 13th stock car race of the 1995 NASCAR Winston Cup Series and the 14th iteration of the event. The race was held on Sunday, June 11, 1995, in Long Pond, Pennsylvania, at Pocono Raceway, a 2.5 miles (4.0 km) triangular permanent course. The race took the scheduled 200 laps to complete. On the final restart with six to go, Hendrick Motorsports driver Terry Labonte would take of an ill-fated teammate, the dominant driver of the day; Jeff Gordon, to take his 16th career NASCAR Winston Cup Series victory and his second victory of the season. To fill out the top three, Roush Racing driver Ted Musgrave and Hendrick Motorsports driver Ken Schrader would finish second and third, respectively.

== Background ==
The layout of Pocono Raceway, the venue where the race was held.

The race was held at Pocono Raceway, which is a three-turn superspeedway located in Long Pond, Pennsylvania. Pocono Raceway is one of a very few NASCAR tracks not owned by either Speedway Motorsports or NASCAR. It is operated by the Igdalsky siblings Brandon, Nicholas, and sister Ashley, and cousins Joseph IV and Chase Mattioli, all of whom are third-generation members of the family-owned Mattco Inc, started by Joseph II and Rose Mattioli.

Outside of the NASCAR races, the track is used throughout the year by Sports Car Club of America (SCCA) and motorcycle clubs as well as racing schools and an IndyCar race. The triangular oval also has three separate infield sections of racetrack – North Course, East Course and South Course. Each of these infield sections use a separate portion of the tri-oval to complete the track. During regular non-race weekends, multiple clubs can use the track by running on different infield sections. Also some of the infield sections can be run in either direction, or multiple infield sections can be put together – such as running the North Course and the South Course and using the tri-oval to connect the two.

=== Entry list ===
- (R) denotes rookie driver.

#	Driver	Team	Make
1	Rick Mast	Precision Products Racing	Pontiac
2	Rusty Wallace	Penske Racing South	Ford
3	Dale Earnhardt	Richard Childress Racing	Chevrolet
4	Sterling Marlin	Morgan–McClure Motorsports	Chevrolet
5	Terry Labonte	Hendrick Motorsports	Chevrolet
6	Mark Martin	Roush Racing	Ford
7	Geoff Bodine	Geoff Bodine Racing	Ford
8	Jeff Burton	Stavola Brothers Racing	Ford
9	Lake Speed	Melling Racing	Ford
10	Ricky Rudd	Rudd Performance Motorsports	Ford
11	Brett Bodine	Junior Johnson & Associates	Ford
12	Derrike Cope	Bobby Allison Motorsports	Ford
15	Dick Trickle	Bud Moore Engineering	Ford
16	Ted Musgrave	Roush Racing	Ford
17	Darrell Waltrip	Darrell Waltrip Motorsports	Chevrolet
18	Bobby Labonte	Joe Gibbs Racing	Chevrolet
21	Morgan Shepherd	Wood Brothers Racing	Ford
22	Randy LaJoie (R)	Bill Davis Racing	Pontiac
23	Jimmy Spencer	Haas-Carter Motorsports	Ford
24	Jeff Gordon	Hendrick Motorsports	Chevrolet
25	Ken Schrader	Hendrick Motorsports	Chevrolet
26	Hut Stricklin	King Racing	Ford
27	Jimmy Horton	Junior Johnson & Associates	Ford
28	Dale Jarrett	Robert Yates Racing	Ford
29	Steve Grissom	Diamond Ridge Motorsports	Chevrolet
30	Michael Waltrip	Bahari Racing	Pontiac
31	Ward Burton	A.G. Dillard Motorsports	Chevrolet
32	Chuck Bown	Active Motorsports	Chevrolet
33	Robert Pressley (R)	Leo Jackson Motorsports	Chevrolet
37	John Andretti	Kranefuss-Haas Racing	Ford
40	Greg Sacks	Dick Brooks Racing	Pontiac
41	Ricky Craven (R)	Larry Hedrick Motorsports	Chevrolet
42	Kyle Petty	Team SABCO	Pontiac
43	Bobby Hamilton	Petty Enterprises	Pontiac
71	Dave Marcis	Marcis Auto Racing	Chevrolet
75	Todd Bodine	Butch Mock Motorsports	Ford
77	Bobby Hillin Jr.	Jasper Motorsports	Ford
78	Pancho Carter	Triad Motorsports	Ford
79	Doug French	Waters Racing	Chevrolet
87	Joe Nemechek	NEMCO Motorsports	Chevrolet
90	Mike Wallace	Donlavey Racing	Ford
94	Bill Elliott	Elliott-Hardy Racing	Ford
98	Jeremy Mayfield	Cale Yarborough Motorsports	Ford

== Qualifying ==
Qualifying was split into two rounds. The first round was held on Friday, June 9, at 3:00 PM EST. Each driver would have one lap to set a time. During the first round, the top 20 drivers in the round would be guaranteed a starting spot in the race. If a driver was not able to guarantee a spot in the first round, they had the option to scrub their time from the first round and try and run a faster lap time in a second round qualifying run, held on Saturday, June 10, at 9:00 AM EST. As with the first round, each driver would have one lap to set a time. For this specific race, positions 21-38 would be decided on time, and depending on who needed it, a select amount of positions were given to cars who had not otherwise qualified but were high enough in owner's points; which was usually four. If needed, a past champion who did not qualify on either time or provisionals could use a champion's provisional, adding one more spot to the field.

Ken Schrader, driving for Hendrick Motorsports, won the pole, setting a time of 55.088 and an average speed of 163.375 mph (262.927 km/h) in the first round.

Doug French was the only driver to fail to qualify.

=== Full qualifying results ===
Pos.	#	Driver	Team	Make	Time	Speed
1	25	Ken Schrader	Hendrick Motorsports	Chevrolet	55.088	163.375
2	6	Mark Martin	Roush Racing	Ford	55.130	163.250
3	43	Bobby Hamilton	Petty Enterprises	Pontiac	55.230	162.955
4	10	Ricky Rudd	Rudd Performance Motorsports	Ford	55.281	162.805
5	24	Jeff Gordon	Hendrick Motorsports	Chevrolet	55.390	162.484
6	7	Geoff Bodine	Geoff Bodine Racing	Ford	55.472	162.244
7	17	Darrell Waltrip	Darrell Waltrip Motorsports	Chevrolet	55.487	162.200
8	2	Rusty Wallace	Penske Racing South	Ford	55.558	161.993
9	21	Morgan Shepherd	Wood Brothers Racing	Ford	55.677	161.647
10	18	Bobby Labonte	Joe Gibbs Racing	Chevrolet	55.687	161.618
11	12	Derrike Cope	Bobby Allison Motorsports	Ford	55.710	161.551
12	40	Greg Sacks	Dick Brooks Racing	Pontiac	55.729	161.496
13	23	Jimmy Spencer	Travis Carter Enterprises	Ford	55.770	161.377
14	28	Dale Jarrett	Robert Yates Racing	Ford	55.787	161.328
15	4	Sterling Marlin	Morgan–McClure Motorsports	Chevrolet	55.788	161.325
16	87	Joe Nemechek	NEMCO Motorsports	Chevrolet	55.800	161.290
17	26	Hut Stricklin	King Racing	Ford	55.800	161.290
18	42	Kyle Petty	Team SABCO	Pontiac	55.827	161.212
19	11	Brett Bodine	Junior Johnson & Associates	Ford	55.842	161.169
20	77	Bobby Hillin Jr.	Jasper Motorsports	Ford	55.848	161.152
Failed to lock in Round 1
21	16	Ted Musgrave	Roush Racing	Ford	55.856	161.129
22	31	Ward Burton	A.G. Dillard Motorsports	Chevrolet	55.860	161.117
23	30	Michael Waltrip	Bahari Racing	Pontiac	55.909	160.976
24	3	Dale Earnhardt	Richard Childress Racing	Chevrolet	55.930	160.915
25	94	Bill Elliott	Elliott-Hardy Racing	Ford	55.944	160.875
26	15	Dick Trickle	Bud Moore Engineering	Ford	56.123	160.362
27	5	Terry Labonte	Hendrick Motorsports	Chevrolet	56.281	159.912
28	75	Todd Bodine	Butch Mock Motorsports	Ford	56.297	159.866
29	37	John Andretti	Kranefuss-Haas Racing	Ford	56.437	159.470
30	27	Jimmy Horton	Junior Johnson & Associates	Ford	56.443	159.453
31	1	Rick Mast	Precision Products Racing	Ford	56.460	159.405
32	71	Dave Marcis	Marcis Auto Racing	Chevrolet	56.555	159.137
33	78	Pancho Carter	Triad Motorsports	Ford	56.559	159.126
34	33	Robert Pressley (R)	Leo Jackson Motorsports	Chevrolet	56.568	159.101
35	98	Jeremy Mayfield	Cale Yarborough Motorsports	Ford	56.583	159.058
36	41	Ricky Craven (R)	Larry Hedrick Motorsports	Chevrolet	56.600	159.011
37	8	Jeff Burton	Stavola Brothers Racing	Ford	56.649	158.873
38	90	Mike Wallace	Donlavey Racing	Ford	56.856	158.295
Provisionals
39	29	Steve Grissom	Diamond Ridge Motorsports	Chevrolet	-*	-*
40	9	Lake Speed	Melling Racing	Ford	-*	-*
41	22	Randy LaJoie (R)	Bill Davis Racing	Pontiac	-*	-*
42	32	Chuck Bown	Active Motorsports	Chevrolet	-*	-*
Failed to qualify
43	79	Doug French	Waters Racing	Chevrolet	-*	-*
Official first round qualifying results
Official starting lineup

== Race results ==
Fin	St	#	Driver	Team	Make	Laps	Led	Status	Pts	Winnings
1	27	5	Terry Labonte	Hendrick Motorsports	Chevrolet	200	7	running	180	$71,175
2	21	16	Ted Musgrave	Roush Racing	Ford	200	6	running	175	$50,525
3	1	25	Ken Schrader	Hendrick Motorsports	Chevrolet	200	18	running	170	$45,550
4	15	4	Sterling Marlin	Morgan–McClure Motorsports	Chevrolet	200	18	running	165	$32,250
5	17	26	Hut Stricklin	King Racing	Ford	200	13	running	160	$30,900
6	25	94	Bill Elliott	Elliott-Hardy Racing	Ford	200	0	running	150	$18,955
7	9	21	Morgan Shepherd	Wood Brothers Racing	Ford	200	4	running	151	$22,555
8	24	3	Dale Earnhardt	Richard Childress Racing	Chevrolet	200	0	running	142	$32,455
9	23	30	Michael Waltrip	Bahari Racing	Pontiac	200	1	running	143	$21,255
10	19	11	Brett Bodine	Junior Johnson & Associates	Ford	200	0	running	134	$27,255
11	2	6	Mark Martin	Roush Racing	Ford	200	0	running	130	$25,105
12	16	87	Joe Nemechek	NEMCO Motorsports	Chevrolet	200	0	running	127	$10,855
13	4	10	Ricky Rudd	Rudd Performance Motorsports	Ford	200	0	running	124	$23,655
14	6	7	Geoff Bodine	Geoff Bodine Racing	Ford	200	3	running	126	$25,055
15	3	43	Bobby Hamilton	Petty Enterprises	Pontiac	200	4	running	123	$15,555
16	5	24	Jeff Gordon	Hendrick Motorsports	Chevrolet	200	124	running	125	$38,655
17	8	2	Rusty Wallace	Penske Racing South	Ford	199	0	running	112	$25,255
18	39	29	Steve Grissom	Diamond Ridge Motorsports	Chevrolet	199	0	running	109	$14,055
19	22	31	Ward Burton	A.G. Dillard Motorsports	Chevrolet	199	0	running	106	$13,805
20	11	12	Derrike Cope	Bobby Allison Motorsports	Ford	199	0	running	103	$15,230
21	31	1	Rick Mast	Precision Products Racing	Ford	199	0	running	100	$18,100
22	26	15	Dick Trickle	Bud Moore Engineering	Ford	199	0	running	97	$17,900
23	20	77	Bobby Hillin Jr.	Jasper Motorsports	Ford	199	0	running	94	$9,200
24	28	75	Todd Bodine	Butch Mock Motorsports	Ford	198	0	running	91	$17,650
25	35	98	Jeremy Mayfield	Cale Yarborough Motorsports	Ford	198	0	running	88	$12,675
26	36	41	Ricky Craven (R)	Larry Hedrick Motorsports	Chevrolet	198	0	running	85	$13,325
27	10	18	Bobby Labonte	Joe Gibbs Racing	Chevrolet	198	2	running	87	$21,975
28	40	9	Lake Speed	Melling Racing	Ford	197	0	running	79	$12,125
29	42	32	Chuck Bown	Active Motorsports	Chevrolet	196	0	running	76	$8,875
30	29	37	John Andretti	Kranefuss-Haas Racing	Ford	195	0	running	73	$11,925
31	32	71	Dave Marcis	Marcis Auto Racing	Chevrolet	195	0	running	70	$11,775
32	38	90	Mike Wallace	Donlavey Racing	Ford	194	0	running	67	$13,725
33	12	40	Greg Sacks	Dick Brooks Racing	Pontiac	194	0	running	64	$11,625
34	30	27	Jimmy Horton	Junior Johnson & Associates	Ford	192	0	running	61	$16,550
35	33	78	Pancho Carter	Triad Motorsports	Ford	180	0	crash	58	$8,475
36	37	8	Jeff Burton	Stavola Brothers Racing	Ford	171	0	engine	55	$15,900
37	34	33	Robert Pressley (R)	Leo Jackson Motorsports	Chevrolet	131	0	clutch	52	$13,835
38	14	28	Dale Jarrett	Robert Yates Racing	Ford	126	0	running	49	$22,610
39	18	42	Kyle Petty	Team SABCO	Pontiac	118	0	engine	46	$13,210
40	41	22	Randy LaJoie (R)	Bill Davis Racing	Pontiac	87	0	engine	43	$13,210
41	13	23	Jimmy Spencer	Travis Carter Enterprises	Ford	62	0	engine	40	$9,110
42	7	17	Darrell Waltrip	Darrell Waltrip Motorsports	Chevrolet	2	0	engine	37	$13,210
Official race results

Previous race: 1995 Miller Genuine Draft 500 (Dover)	NASCAR Winston Cup Series; 1995 season	Next race: 1995 Miller Genuine Draft 400 (Michigan)
