= 1995 Miller Genuine Draft 400 (Michigan) =

14th race of the 1995 NASCAR Winston Cup Series

Race details
- Race 14 of 31 in the 1995 NASCAR Winston Cup Series
- The 1995 Miller 400 program cover, featuring Rusty Wallace. Artwork by NASCAR artist Sam Bass.
- Date: June 18, 1995
- Official name: 27th Annual Miller Genuine Draft 400
- Location: Cambridge Township, Michigan, Michigan International Speedway
- Course: Permanent racing facility
- Course length: 2 miles (3.2 km)
- Distance: 200 laps, 400 mi (643.737 km)
- Scheduled distance: 200 laps, 400 mi (643.737 km)
- Average speed: 134.141 miles per hour (215.879 km/h)

Pole position
Driver	Jeff Gordon	Hendrick Motorsports
- Time: 38.583

Most laps led
Driver	Jeff Gordon	Hendrick Motorsports
- Laps: 80

Winner
No. 18	Bobby Labonte	Joe Gibbs Racing

Television in the United States
- Network: CBS
- Announcers: Ken Squier, Ned Jarrett, Richard Petty

Radio in the United States
- Radio: Motor Racing Network

The 1995 Miller Genuine Draft 400 was the 14th stock car race of the 1995 NASCAR Winston Cup Series and the 14th iteration of the event. The race was held on Sunday, June 18, 1995, in Cambridge Township, Michigan, at Michigan International Speedway, a two-mile (3.2 km) moderate-banked D-shaped speedway. The race took the scheduled 200 laps to complete. On the final restart with 16 to go, Joe Gibbs Racing driver Bobby Labonte managed to make a charge to the front and raced to his second career NASCAR Winston Cup Series victory and his second victory of the season. Hendrick Motorsports driver Jeff Gordon and Penske Racing South driver Rusty Wallace finished second and third respectively.

== Background ==
The layout of Michigan International Speedway, the venue where the race was held.

The race was held at Michigan International Speedway, a two-mile (3.2 km) moderate-banked D-shaped speedway located in Cambridge Township, Michigan. The track is used primarily for NASCAR events. It is known as a "sister track" to Texas World Speedway as MIS's oval design was a direct basis of TWS, with moderate modifications to the banking in the corners, and was used as the basis of Auto Club Speedway. The track is owned by International Speedway Corporation. Michigan International Speedway is recognized as one of motorsports' premier facilities because of its wide racing surface and high banking (by open-wheel standards; the 18-degree banking is modest by stock car standards).

=== Entry list ===
- (R) denotes rookie driver.

#	Driver	Team	Make
1	Rick Mast	Precision Products Racing	Pontiac
2	Rusty Wallace	Penske Racing South	Ford
3	Dale Earnhardt	Richard Childress Racing	Chevrolet
4	Sterling Marlin	Morgan–McClure Motorsports	Chevrolet
5	Terry Labonte	Hendrick Motorsports	Chevrolet
6	Mark Martin	Roush Racing	Ford
7	Geoff Bodine	Geoff Bodine Racing	Ford
8	Jeff Burton	Stavola Brothers Racing	Ford
9	Lake Speed	Melling Racing	Ford
10	Ricky Rudd	Rudd Performance Motorsports	Ford
11	Brett Bodine	Junior Johnson & Associates	Ford
12	Derrike Cope	Bobby Allison Motorsports	Ford
15	Dick Trickle	Bud Moore Engineering	Ford
16	Ted Musgrave	Roush Racing	Ford
17	Darrell Waltrip	Darrell Waltrip Motorsports	Chevrolet
18	Bobby Labonte	Joe Gibbs Racing	Chevrolet
21	Morgan Shepherd	Wood Brothers Racing	Ford
22	Randy LaJoie (R)	Bill Davis Racing	Pontiac
23	Jimmy Spencer	Haas-Carter Motorsports	Ford
24	Jeff Gordon	Hendrick Motorsports	Chevrolet
25	Ken Schrader	Hendrick Motorsports	Chevrolet
26	Hut Stricklin	King Racing	Ford
27	Jimmy Horton	Junior Johnson & Associates	Ford
28	Dale Jarrett	Robert Yates Racing	Ford
29	Steve Grissom	Diamond Ridge Motorsports	Chevrolet
30	Michael Waltrip	Bahari Racing	Pontiac
31	Ward Burton	A.G. Dillard Motorsports	Chevrolet
32	Chuck Bown	Active Motorsports	Chevrolet
33	Robert Pressley (R)	Leo Jackson Motorsports	Chevrolet
37	John Andretti	Kranefuss-Haas Racing	Ford
40	Greg Sacks	Dick Brooks Racing	Pontiac
41	Ricky Craven (R)	Larry Hedrick Motorsports	Chevrolet
42	Kyle Petty	Team SABCO	Pontiac
43	Bobby Hamilton	Petty Enterprises	Pontiac
44	Jeff Purvis	Phoenix Racing	Chevrolet
71	Dave Marcis	Marcis Auto Racing	Chevrolet
75	Todd Bodine	Butch Mock Motorsports	Ford
77	Bobby Hillin Jr.	Jasper Motorsports	Ford
81	Kenny Wallace	FILMAR Racing	Ford
87	Joe Nemechek	NEMCO Motorsports	Chevrolet
88	Gary Bradberry	Bradberry Racing	Chevrolet
90	Mike Wallace	Donlavey Racing	Ford
94	Bill Elliott	Elliott-Hardy Racing	Ford
98	Jeremy Mayfield	Cale Yarborough Motorsports	Ford

== Qualifying ==
Qualifying was split into two rounds. The first round was held on Friday, June 16, at 3:30 PM EST. Each driver would have one lap to set a time. During the first round, the top 20 drivers in the round would be guaranteed a starting spot in the race. If a driver was not able to guarantee a spot in the first round, they had the option to scrub their time from the first round and try and run a faster lap time in a second round qualifying run, held on Saturday, June 17, at 11:00 AM EST. As with the first round, each driver would have one lap to set a time. For this specific race, positions 21-38 would be decided on time, and depending on who needed it, a select amount of positions were given to cars who had not otherwise qualified but were high enough in owner's points.

Jeff Gordon, driving for Hendrick Motorsports, won the pole, setting a time of 38.583 and an average speed of 186.611 mph (300.321 km/h).

Two drivers would fail to qualify.

=== Full qualifying results ===
Pos.	#	Driver	Team	Make	Time	Speed
1	24	Jeff Gordon	Hendrick Motorsports	Chevrolet	38.583	186.611
2	10	Ricky Rudd	Rudd Performance Motorsports	Ford	38.887	185.152
3	4	Sterling Marlin	Morgan–McClure Motorsports	Chevrolet	39.000	184.615
4	6	Mark Martin	Roush Racing	Ford	39.023	184.507
5	2	Rusty Wallace	Penske Racing South	Ford	39.041	184.422
6	16	Ted Musgrave	Roush Racing	Ford	39.050	184.379
7	3	Dale Earnhardt	Richard Childress Racing	Chevrolet	39.059	184.337
8	15	Dick Trickle	Bud Moore Engineering	Ford	39.062	184.322
9	98	Jeremy Mayfield	Cale Yarborough Motorsports	Ford	39.124	184.030
10	9	Lake Speed	Melling Racing	Ford	39.132	183.993
11	87	Joe Nemechek	NEMCO Motorsports	Chevrolet	39.152	183.899
12	43	Bobby Hamilton	Petty Enterprises	Pontiac	39.173	183.800
13	23	Jimmy Spencer	Travis Carter Enterprises	Ford	39.173	183.800
14	77	Bobby Hillin Jr.	Jasper Motorsports	Ford	39.190	183.720
15	5	Terry Labonte	Hendrick Motorsports	Chevrolet	39.193	183.706
16	17	Darrell Waltrip	Darrell Waltrip Motorsports	Chevrolet	39.233	183.519
17	26	Hut Stricklin	King Racing	Ford	39.303	183.192
18	1	Rick Mast	Precision Products Racing	Ford	39.315	183.136
19	18	Bobby Labonte	Joe Gibbs Racing	Chevrolet	39.326	183.085
20	31	Ward Burton	A.G. Dillard Motorsports	Chevrolet	39.338	183.029
Failed to lock in Round 1
21	37	John Andretti	Kranefuss-Haas Racing	Ford	39.165	183.838
22	33	Robert Pressley (R)	Leo Jackson Motorsports	Chevrolet	39.222	183.570
23	27	Elton Sawyer	Junior Johnson & Associates	Ford	39.334	183.048
24	30	Michael Waltrip	Bahari Racing	Pontiac	39.361	182.922
25	11	Brett Bodine	Junior Johnson & Associates	Ford	39.363	182.913
26	8	Jeff Burton	Stavola Brothers Racing	Ford	39.363	182.913
27	75	Todd Bodine	Butch Mock Motorsports	Ford	39.364	182.908
28	90	Mike Wallace	Donlavey Racing	Ford	39.379	182.839
29	28	Dale Jarrett	Robert Yates Racing	Ford	39.395	182.764
30	41	Ricky Craven (R)	Larry Hedrick Motorsports	Chevrolet	39.441	182.551
31	22	Randy LaJoie (R)	Bill Davis Racing	Pontiac	39.457	182.477
32	32	Chuck Bown	Active Motorsports	Chevrolet	39.475	182.394
33	81	Kenny Wallace	FILMAR Racing	Ford	39.486	182.343
34	94	Bill Elliott	Elliott-Hardy Racing	Ford	39.573	181.942
35	7	Geoff Bodine	Geoff Bodine Racing	Ford	39.578	181.919
36	12	Derrike Cope	Bobby Allison Motorsports	Ford	39.599	181.823
37	29	Steve Grissom	Diamond Ridge Motorsports	Chevrolet	39.608	181.781
38	44	Jeff Purvis	Phoenix Racing	Chevrolet	39.624	181.708
Provisionals
39	21	Morgan Shepherd	Wood Brothers Racing	Ford	-*	-*
40	25	Ken Schrader	Hendrick Motorsports	Chevrolet	-*	-*
41	42	Kyle Petty	Team SABCO	Pontiac	-*	-*
42	71	Dave Marcis	Marcis Auto Racing	Chevrolet	-*	-*
Failed to qualify
43	88	Gary Bradberry	Bradberry Racing	Chevrolet	-*	-*
44	40	Greg Sacks	Dick Brooks Racing	Pontiac	-*	-*
Official first round qualifying results
Official starting lineup

== Race results ==
Fin	St	#	Driver	Team	Make	Laps	Led	Status	Pts	Winnings
1	19	18	Bobby Labonte	Joe Gibbs Racing	Chevrolet	200	58	running	180	$84,080
2	1	24	Jeff Gordon	Hendrick Motorsports	Chevrolet	200	80	running	180	$72,530
3	5	2	Rusty Wallace	Penske Racing South	Ford	200	7	running	170	$44,780
4	21	37	John Andretti	Kranefuss-Haas Racing	Ford	200	1	running	165	$31,375
5	39	21	Morgan Shepherd	Wood Brothers Racing	Ford	200	5	running	160	$36,075
6	29	28	Dale Jarrett	Robert Yates Racing	Ford	200	8	running	155	$33,500
7	3	4	Sterling Marlin	Morgan–McClure Motorsports	Chevrolet	200	0	running	146	$37,350
8	4	6	Mark Martin	Roush Racing	Ford	200	0	running	142	$31,200
9	15	5	Terry Labonte	Hendrick Motorsports	Chevrolet	200	0	running	138	$30,800
10	6	16	Ted Musgrave	Roush Racing	Ford	200	0	running	134	$17,400
11	10	9	Lake Speed	Melling Racing	Ford	200	0	running	130	$18,950
12	24	30	Michael Waltrip	Bahari Racing	Pontiac	200	0	running	127	$23,375
13	14	77	Bobby Hillin Jr.	Jasper Motorsports	Ford	199	0	running	124	$13,625
14	34	94	Bill Elliott	Elliott-Hardy Racing	Ford	199	0	running	121	$17,375
15	42	71	Dave Marcis	Marcis Auto Racing	Chevrolet	199	0	running	118	$18,375
16	8	15	Dick Trickle	Bud Moore Engineering	Ford	198	5	running	120	$21,400
17	22	33	Robert Pressley (R)	Leo Jackson Motorsports	Chevrolet	198	0	running	112	$21,975
18	20	31	Ward Burton	A.G. Dillard Motorsports	Chevrolet	198	0	running	109	$15,640
19	36	12	Derrike Cope	Bobby Allison Motorsports	Ford	198	0	running	106	$15,325
20	37	29	Steve Grissom	Diamond Ridge Motorsports	Chevrolet	198	0	running	103	$16,760
21	35	7	Geoff Bodine	Geoff Bodine Racing	Ford	197	0	flagged	100	$25,890
22	9	98	Jeremy Mayfield	Cale Yarborough Motorsports	Ford	196	0	running	97	$14,575
23	23	27	Elton Sawyer	Junior Johnson & Associates	Ford	196	0	running	94	$24,065
24	32	32	Chuck Bown	Active Motorsports	Chevrolet	188	0	running	91	$10,955
25	12	43	Bobby Hamilton	Petty Enterprises	Pontiac	183	0	running	88	$14,345
26	16	17	Darrell Waltrip	Darrell Waltrip Motorsports	Chevrolet	176	3	crash	90	$18,885
27	40	25	Ken Schrader	Hendrick Motorsports	Chevrolet	176	0	running	82	$18,725
28	11	87	Joe Nemechek	NEMCO Motorsports	Chevrolet	175	0	engine	79	$10,565
29	27	75	Todd Bodine	Butch Mock Motorsports	Ford	175	0	engine	76	$18,455
30	13	23	Jimmy Spencer	Travis Carter Enterprises	Ford	175	0	running	73	$13,390
31	26	8	Jeff Burton	Stavola Brothers Racing	Ford	143	0	running	70	$17,760
32	28	90	Mike Wallace	Donlavey Racing	Ford	138	0	crash	67	$10,190
33	30	41	Ricky Craven (R)	Larry Hedrick Motorsports	Chevrolet	134	0	running	64	$10,085
34	18	1	Rick Mast	Precision Products Racing	Ford	133	0	running	61	$15,015
35	7	3	Dale Earnhardt	Richard Childress Racing	Chevrolet	127	2	crash	63	$29,945
36	33	81	Kenny Wallace	FILMAR Racing	Ford	78	0	engine	55	$9,900
37	17	26	Hut Stricklin	King Racing	Ford	70	0	crash	52	$14,865
38	2	10	Ricky Rudd	Rudd Performance Motorsports	Ford	70	31	crash	54	$24,780
39	38	44	Jeff Purvis	Phoenix Racing	Chevrolet	63	0	engine	46	$9,780
40	25	11	Brett Bodine	Junior Johnson & Associates	Ford	50	0	crash	43	$22,780
41	31	22	Randy LaJoie (R)	Bill Davis Racing	Pontiac	18	0	valve	40	$14,780
42	41	42	Kyle Petty	Team SABCO	Pontiac	17	0	engine	37	$14,780
Official race results

Previous race: 1995 UAW-GM Teamwork 500	NASCAR Winston Cup Series; 1995 season	Next race: 1995 Pepsi 400
