= 1995 Winston Select 500 =

Ninth race of the 1995 NASCAR Winston Cup Series

Race details
- Race 9 of 31 in the 1995 NASCAR Winston Cup Series
- The 1995 Winston Select 500 program cover.
- Date: April 30, 1995
- Official name: 26th Annual Winston Select 500
- Location: Lincoln, Alabama, Talladega Superspeedway
- Course: Permanent racing facility
- Course length: 2.66 miles (4.28 km)
- Distance: 188 laps, 500.08 mi (804.8 km)
- Scheduled distance: 188 laps, 500.08 mi (804.8 km)
- Average speed: 178.902 miles per hour (287.915 km/h)

Pole position
Driver	Terry Labonte	Hendrick Motorsports
- Time: 48.725

Most laps led
Driver	Mark Martin	Roush Racing
- Laps: 88

Winner
No. 6	Mark Martin	Roush Racing

Television in the United States
- Network: ESPN
- Announcers: Bob Jenkins, Ned Jarrett, Benny Parsons

Radio in the United States
- Radio: Motor Racing Network

The 1995 Winston Select 500 was the ninth stock car race of the 1995 NASCAR Winston Cup Series and the 26th iteration of the event. The race was held on Sunday, April 30, 1995, in Lincoln, Alabama at Talladega Superspeedway, a 2.66 miles (4.28 km) permanent triangle-shaped superspeedway. The race took the scheduled 188 laps to complete. In the final laps of the race, Roush Racing driver Mark Martin would manage to complete a pass for the lead with two to go and defend the field to take his 15th career NASCAR Winston Cup Series victory and his first victory of the season. To fill out the top three, Hendrick Motorsports driver Jeff Gordon and Wood Brothers Racing driver Morgan Shepherd would finish second and third, respectively.

== Background ==
The layout of Talladega Superspeedway, the venue where the race was held.

Talladega Superspeedway, originally known as Alabama International Motor Superspeedway (AIMS), is a motorsports complex located north of Talladega, Alabama. It is located on the former Anniston Air Force Base in the small city of Lincoln. The track is a tri-oval and was constructed in the 1960s by the International Speedway Corporation, a business controlled by the France family. Talladega is most known for its steep banking and the unique location of the start/finish line that's located just past the exit to pit road. The track currently hosts the NASCAR series such as the NASCAR Cup Series, Xfinity Series and the Camping World Truck Series. Talladega is the longest NASCAR oval with a length of 2.66-mile-long (4.28 km) tri-oval like the Daytona International Speedway, which also is a 2.5-mile-long (4 km) tri-oval.

=== Entry list ===
- (R) denotes rookie driver.

#	Driver	Team	Make
0	Delma Cowart	H. L. Waters Racing	Ford
1	Rick Mast	Precision Products Racing	Pontiac
2	Rusty Wallace	Penske Racing South	Ford
3	Dale Earnhardt	Richard Childress Racing	Chevrolet
4	Sterling Marlin	Morgan–McClure Motorsports	Chevrolet
5	Terry Labonte	Hendrick Motorsports	Chevrolet
6	Mark Martin	Roush Racing	Ford
7	Geoff Bodine	Geoff Bodine Racing	Ford
8	Jeff Burton	Stavola Brothers Racing	Ford
9	Lake Speed	Melling Racing	Ford
10	Ricky Rudd	Rudd Performance Motorsports	Ford
11	Brett Bodine	Junior Johnson & Associates	Ford
12	Derrike Cope	Bobby Allison Motorsports	Ford
15	Dick Trickle	Bud Moore Engineering	Ford
16	Ted Musgrave	Roush Racing	Ford
17	Darrell Waltrip	Darrell Waltrip Motorsports	Chevrolet
18	Bobby Labonte	Joe Gibbs Racing	Chevrolet
19	Loy Allen Jr.	TriStar Motorsports	Ford
21	Morgan Shepherd	Wood Brothers Racing	Ford
22	Randy LaJoie (R)	Bill Davis Racing	Pontiac
23	Jimmy Spencer	Haas-Carter Motorsports	Ford
24	Jeff Gordon	Hendrick Motorsports	Chevrolet
25	Ken Schrader	Hendrick Motorsports	Chevrolet
26	Hut Stricklin	King Racing	Ford
27	Elton Sawyer	Junior Johnson & Associates	Ford
28	Dale Jarrett	Robert Yates Racing	Ford
29	Steve Grissom	Diamond Ridge Motorsports	Chevrolet
30	Michael Waltrip	Bahari Racing	Pontiac
31	Ward Burton	A.G. Dillard Motorsports	Chevrolet
33	Robert Pressley (R)	Leo Jackson Motorsports	Chevrolet
37	John Andretti	Kranefuss-Haas Racing	Ford
40	Greg Sacks	Dick Brooks Racing	Pontiac
41	Ricky Craven (R)	Larry Hedrick Motorsports	Chevrolet
42	Kyle Petty	Team SABCO	Pontiac
43	Bobby Hamilton	Petty Enterprises	Pontiac
44	Jeff Purvis	Phoenix Racing	Ford
47	Billy Standridge	Standridge Motorsports	Ford
53	Ritchie Petty	Petty Brothers Racing	Ford
65	Steve Seligman	O'Neil Racing	Chevrolet
71	Dave Marcis	Marcis Auto Racing	Chevrolet
75	Todd Bodine	Butch Mock Motorsports	Ford
77	Davy Jones (R)	Jasper Motorsports	Ford
81	Kenny Wallace	FILMAR Racing	Ford
87	Joe Nemechek	NEMCO Motorsports	Chevrolet
90	Mike Wallace	Donlavey Racing	Ford
94	Bill Elliott	Elliott-Hardy Racing	Ford
98	Jeremy Mayfield	Cale Yarborough Motorsports	Ford

== Qualifying ==
Qualifying was split into two rounds. The first round was held on Friday, April 28, at 4:00 PM EST. Each driver would have one lap to set a time. During the first round, the top 20 drivers in the round would be guaranteed a starting spot in the race. If a driver was not able to guarantee a spot in the first round, they had the option to scrub their time from the first round and try and run a faster lap time in a second round qualifying run, held on Saturday, April 29, at 11:30 PM EST. As with the first round, each driver would have one lap to set a time. For this specific race, positions 21-38 would be decided on time, and depending on who needed it, a select amount of positions were given to cars who had not otherwise qualified but were high enough in owner's points; which was usually four. If needed, a past champion who did not qualify on either time or provisionals could use a champion's provisional, adding one more spot to the field.

Terry Labonte, driving for Hendrick Motorsports, won the pole, setting a time of 48.725 and an average speed of 196.532 mph (316.288 km/h) in the first round.

Five drivers would fail to qualify.

=== Full qualifying results ===
Pos.	#	Driver	Team	Make	Time	Speed
1	5	Terry Labonte	Hendrick Motorsports	Chevrolet	48.725	196.532
2	19	Loy Allen Jr.	TriStar Motorsports	Ford	48.863	195.977
3	6	Mark Martin	Roush Racing	Ford	48.925	195.728
4	18	Bobby Labonte	Joe Gibbs Racing	Chevrolet	48.941	195.664
5	28	Dale Jarrett	Robert Yates Racing	Ford	48.956	195.604
6	24	Jeff Gordon	Hendrick Motorsports	Chevrolet	48.979	195.512
7	4	Sterling Marlin	Morgan–McClure Motorsports	Chevrolet	49.057	195.202
8	15	Dick Trickle	Bud Moore Engineering	Ford	49.152	194.824
9	33	Robert Pressley (R)	Leo Jackson Motorsports	Chevrolet	49.161	194.789
10	30	Michael Waltrip	Bahari Racing	Pontiac	49.173	194.741
11	16	Ted Musgrave	Roush Racing	Ford	49.206	194.610
12	75	Todd Bodine	Butch Mock Motorsports	Ford	49.255	194.417
13	1	Rick Mast	Precision Products Racing	Ford	49.309	194.204
14	21	Morgan Shepherd	Wood Brothers Racing	Ford	49.315	194.180
15	9	Lake Speed	Melling Racing	Ford	49.343	194.070
16	3	Dale Earnhardt	Richard Childress Racing	Chevrolet	49.345	194.062
17	26	Hut Stricklin	King Racing	Ford	49.368	193.972
18	22	Randy LaJoie (R)	Bill Davis Racing	Pontiac	49.429	193.732
19	23	Jimmy Spencer	Travis Carter Enterprises	Ford	49.436	193.705
20	25	Ken Schrader	Hendrick Motorsports	Chevrolet	49.458	193.619
21	17	Darrell Waltrip	Darrell Waltrip Motorsports	Chevrolet	49.484	193.517
22	77	Davy Jones (R)	Jasper Motorsports	Ford	49.490	193.494
23	81	Kenny Wallace	FILMAR Racing	Ford	49.543	193.287
24	94	Bill Elliott	Elliott-Hardy Racing	Ford	49.622	192.979
25	12	Derrike Cope	Bobby Allison Motorsports	Ford	49.667	192.804
26	10	Ricky Rudd	Rudd Performance Motorsports	Ford	49.693	192.703
27	90	Mike Wallace	Donlavey Racing	Ford	49.723	192.587
28	44	Jeff Purvis	Phoenix Racing	Ford	49.736	192.537
29	42	Kyle Petty	Team SABCO	Pontiac	49.762	192.436
30	43	Bobby Hamilton	Petty Enterprises	Pontiac	49.790	192.328
31	27	Elton Sawyer	Junior Johnson & Associates	Ford	49.796	192.305
32	40	Greg Sacks	Dick Brooks Racing	Pontiac	49.816	192.227
33	98	Jeremy Mayfield	Cale Yarborough Motorsports	Ford	49.828	192.181
34	37	John Andretti	Kranefuss-Haas Racing	Ford	49.833	192.162
35	2	Rusty Wallace	Penske Racing South	Ford	49.867	192.031
36	71	Dave Marcis	Marcis Auto Racing	Chevrolet	49.885	191.962
37	8	Jeff Burton	Stavola Brothers Racing	Ford	49.948	191.719
38	41	Ricky Craven (R)	Larry Hedrick Motorsports	Chevrolet	50.000	191.520
Provisionals
39	29	Steve Grissom	Diamond Ridge Motorsports	Chevrolet	-*	-*
40	11	Brett Bodine	Junior Johnson & Associates	Ford	-*	-*
41	7	Geoff Bodine	Geoff Bodine Racing	Ford	-*	-*
42	31	Ward Burton	A.G. Dillard Motorsports	Chevrolet	-*	-*
Failed to qualify
43	53	Ritchie Petty	Petty Brothers Racing	Ford	-*	-*
44	47	Billy Standridge	Standridge Motorsports	Ford	-*	-*
45	87	Joe Nemechek	NEMCO Motorsports	Chevrolet	-*	-*
46	65	Steve Seligman	O'Neil Racing	Chevrolet	-*	-*
47	0	Delma Cowart	H. L. Waters Racing	Ford	-*	-*
Official first round qualifying results
Official starting lineup

== Race results ==
Fin	St	#	Driver	Team	Make	Laps	Led	Status	Pts	Winnings
1	3	6	Mark Martin	Roush Racing	Ford	188	88	running	185	$98,565
2	6	24	Jeff Gordon	Hendrick Motorsports	Chevrolet	188	12	running	175	$165,315
3	14	21	Morgan Shepherd	Wood Brothers Racing	Ford	188	0	running	165	$62,145
4	21	17	Darrell Waltrip	Darrell Waltrip Motorsports	Chevrolet	188	5	running	165	$43,095
5	4	18	Bobby Labonte	Joe Gibbs Racing	Chevrolet	188	0	running	155	$40,115
6	24	94	Bill Elliott	Elliott-Hardy Racing	Ford	188	0	running	150	$22,605
7	41	7	Geoff Bodine	Geoff Bodine Racing	Ford	188	0	running	146	$38,700
8	12	75	Todd Bodine	Butch Mock Motorsports	Ford	188	0	running	142	$29,050
9	19	23	Jimmy Spencer	Travis Carter Enterprises	Ford	188	0	running	139	$22,650
10	2	19	Loy Allen Jr.	TriStar Motorsports	Ford	188	18	running	139	$20,350
11	11	16	Ted Musgrave	Roush Racing	Ford	188	0	running	136	$25,070
12	10	30	Michael Waltrip	Bahari Racing	Pontiac	188	0	running	127	$24,490
13	18	22	Randy LaJoie (R)	Bill Davis Racing	Pontiac	188	0	running	124	$24,960
14	33	98	Jeremy Mayfield	Cale Yarborough Motorsports	Ford	188	0	running	121	$18,380
15	30	43	Bobby Hamilton	Petty Enterprises	Pontiac	188	0	running	118	$18,950
16	15	9	Lake Speed	Melling Racing	Ford	188	0	running	115	$13,910
17	38	41	Ricky Craven (R)	Larry Hedrick Motorsports	Chevrolet	188	0	running	112	$17,295
18	9	33	Robert Pressley (R)	Leo Jackson Motorsports	Chevrolet	188	0	running	109	$21,455
19	5	28	Dale Jarrett	Robert Yates Racing	Ford	188	35	running	111	$27,240
20	35	2	Rusty Wallace	Penske Racing South	Ford	188	9	running	108	$27,755
21	16	3	Dale Earnhardt	Richard Childress Racing	Chevrolet	188	6	running	105	$34,735
22	26	10	Ricky Rudd	Rudd Performance Motorsports	Ford	187	0	running	97	$25,115
23	27	90	Mike Wallace	Donlavey Racing	Ford	187	0	accident	94	$15,405
24	17	26	Hut Stricklin	King Racing	Ford	187	0	running	91	$20,400
25	37	8	Jeff Burton	Stavola Brothers Racing	Ford	187	0	running	88	$20,270
26	1	5	Terry Labonte	Hendrick Motorsports	Chevrolet	187	2	running	90	$26,540
27	31	27	Elton Sawyer	Junior Johnson & Associates	Ford	187	0	running	82	$21,185
28	13	1	Rick Mast	Precision Products Racing	Ford	187	0	running	79	$24,730
29	28	44	Jeff Purvis	Phoenix Racing	Ford	187	0	running	76	$11,575
30	40	11	Brett Bodine	Junior Johnson & Associates	Ford	187	0	running	73	$24,520
31	29	42	Kyle Petty	Team SABCO	Pontiac	186	0	running	70	$19,365
32	42	31	Ward Burton	A.G. Dillard Motorsports	Chevrolet	186	0	running	67	$11,310
33	22	77	Davy Jones (R)	Jasper Motorsports	Ford	185	0	running	64	$14,280
34	36	71	Dave Marcis	Marcis Auto Racing	Chevrolet	185	0	running	61	$11,250
35	32	40	Greg Sacks	Dick Brooks Racing	Pontiac	185	0	running	58	$18,720
36	23	81	Kenny Wallace	FILMAR Racing	Ford	185	0	running	55	$11,190
37	39	29	Steve Grissom	Diamond Ridge Motorsports	Chevrolet	184	0	running	52	$11,126
38	8	15	Dick Trickle	Bud Moore Engineering	Ford	180	0	running	49	$15,990
39	7	4	Sterling Marlin	Morgan–McClure Motorsports	Chevrolet	145	1	running	51	$23,990
40	20	25	Ken Schrader	Hendrick Motorsports	Chevrolet	137	12	engine	48	$15,990
41	34	37	John Andretti	Kranefuss-Haas Racing	Ford	65	0	accident	40	$10,990
42	25	12	Derrike Cope	Bobby Allison Motorsports	Ford	64	0	accident	37	$10,990
Official race results

Previous race: 1995 Hanes 500	NASCAR Winston Cup Series; 1995 season	Next race: 1995 Save Mart Supermarkets 300
