= 1995 Coca-Cola 600 =

11th race of the 1995 NASCAR Winston Cup Series

Race details
- Race 11 of 31 in the 1995 NASCAR Winston Cup Series
- The 1995 Coca-Cola 600 program cover, with artwork by NASCAR artist Sam Bass.
- Date: May 28, 1995
- Official name: 36th Annual Coca-Cola 600
- Location: Concord, North Carolina, Charlotte Motor Speedway
- Course: Permanent racing facility
- Course length: 1.5 miles (2.414 km)
- Distance: 400 laps, 600 mi (965.606 km)
- Average speed: 151.952 miles per hour (244.543 km/h)
- Attendance: 175,000

Pole position
Driver	Jeff Gordon	Hendrick Motorsports
- Time: 29.370

Most laps led
Driver	Ken Schrader	Hendrick Motorsports
- Laps: 169

Winner
No. 18	Bobby Labonte	Joe Gibbs Racing

Television in the United States
- Network: TBS
- Announcers: Ken Squier, Ernie Irvan, Richard Petty

Radio in the United States
- Radio: Performance Racing Network

The 1995 Coca-Cola 600 was the 11th stock car race of the 1995 NASCAR Winston Cup Series and the 36th iteration of the event. The race was held on Sunday, May 28, 1995, before an audience of 175,000 in Concord, North Carolina, at Charlotte Motor Speedway, a 1.5 miles (2.4 km) permanent quad-oval. The race took the scheduled 400 laps to complete. At race's end, Joe Gibbs Racing driver Bobby Labonte would manage to dominate the late stages of the race with the help of changing his racing line according to Labonte. The victory was Labonte's first career NASCAR Winston Cup Series victory and his first victory of the season. To fill out the top three, Hendrick Motorsports driver Terry Labonte and Bahari Racing driver Michael Waltrip would finish second and third, respectively.

It was the first time the race finished in under four hours.

== Background ==
The layout of Charlotte Motor Speedway, the venue where the race was held.

Charlotte Motor Speedway is a motorsports complex located in Concord, North Carolina, United States 13 miles from Charlotte, North Carolina. The complex features a 1.5 miles (2.4 km) quad oval track that hosts NASCAR racing including the prestigious Coca-Cola 600 on Memorial Day weekend and the NEXTEL All-Star Challenge, as well as the UAW-GM Quality 500. The speedway was built in 1959 by Bruton Smith and is considered the home track for NASCAR with many race teams located in the Charlotte area. The track is owned and operated by Speedway Motorsports Inc. (SMI) with Marcus G. Smith (son of Bruton Smith) as track president.

=== Entry list ===
- (R) denotes rookie driver.

#	Driver	Team	Make
1	Rick Mast	Precision Products Racing	Pontiac
2	Rusty Wallace	Penske Racing South	Ford
3	Dale Earnhardt	Richard Childress Racing	Chevrolet
4	Sterling Marlin	Morgan–McClure Motorsports	Chevrolet
5	Terry Labonte	Hendrick Motorsports	Chevrolet
6	Mark Martin	Roush Racing	Ford
7	Geoff Bodine	Geoff Bodine Racing	Ford
8	Jeff Burton	Stavola Brothers Racing	Ford
9	Lake Speed	Melling Racing	Ford
10	Ricky Rudd	Rudd Performance Motorsports	Ford
11	Brett Bodine	Junior Johnson & Associates	Ford
12	Derrike Cope	Bobby Allison Motorsports	Ford
14	Jimmy Hensley	Hagan Racing	Ford
15	Dick Trickle	Bud Moore Engineering	Ford
16	Ted Musgrave	Roush Racing	Ford
17	Darrell Waltrip	Darrell Waltrip Motorsports	Chevrolet
18	Bobby Labonte	Joe Gibbs Racing	Chevrolet
19	Loy Allen Jr.	TriStar Motorsports	Ford
20	Bobby Hillin Jr.	Moroso Racing	Ford
21	Morgan Shepherd	Wood Brothers Racing	Ford
22	Randy LaJoie (R)	Bill Davis Racing	Pontiac
23	Jimmy Spencer	Haas-Carter Motorsports	Ford
24	Jeff Gordon	Hendrick Motorsports	Chevrolet
25	Ken Schrader	Hendrick Motorsports	Chevrolet
26	Hut Stricklin	King Racing	Ford
27	Elton Sawyer	Junior Johnson & Associates	Ford
28	Dale Jarrett	Robert Yates Racing	Ford
29	Steve Grissom	Diamond Ridge Motorsports	Chevrolet
30	Michael Waltrip	Bahari Racing	Pontiac
31	Ward Burton	A.G. Dillard Motorsports	Chevrolet
32	Chuck Bown	Active Motorsports	Chevrolet
33	Robert Pressley (R)	Leo Jackson Motorsports	Chevrolet
37	John Andretti	Kranefuss-Haas Racing	Ford
40	Greg Sacks	Dick Brooks Racing	Pontiac
41	Ricky Craven (R)	Larry Hedrick Motorsports	Chevrolet
42	Kyle Petty	Team SABCO	Pontiac
43	Bobby Hamilton	Petty Enterprises	Pontiac
44	Jeff Purvis	Phoenix Racing	Chevrolet
67	Johnny Chapman	RaDiUs Motorsports	Ford
71	Dave Marcis	Marcis Auto Racing	Chevrolet
75	Todd Bodine	Butch Mock Motorsports	Ford
77	Davy Jones	Jasper Motorsports	Ford
81	Kenny Wallace	FILMAR Racing	Ford
87	Joe Nemechek	NEMCO Motorsports	Chevrolet
90	Mike Wallace	Donlavey Racing	Ford
94	Bill Elliott	Elliott-Hardy Racing	Ford
97	Chad Little	Mark Rypien Motorsports	Ford
98	Jeremy Mayfield	Cale Yarborough Motorsports	Ford

== Qualifying ==
Qualifying was split into two rounds. The first round was held on Wednesday, May 24, at 7:00 PM EST. Each driver would have one lap to set a time. During the first round, the top 25 drivers in the round would be guaranteed a starting spot in the race. If a driver was not able to guarantee a spot in the first round, they had the option to scrub their time from the first round and try and run a faster lap time in a second round qualifying run, held on Thursday, May 25, at 6:00 PM EST. As with the first round, each driver would have one lap to set a time. For this specific race, positions 26-38 would be decided on time, and depending on who needed it, a select amount of positions were given to cars who had not otherwise qualified but were high enough in owner's points; up to four provisionals were given. If needed, a past champion who did not qualify on either time or provisionals could use a champion's provisional, adding one more spot to the field.

Jeff Gordon, driving for Hendrick Motorsports, won the pole, setting a time of 29.370 and an average speed of 183.861 mph (295.896 km/h) in the first round.

Six drivers would fail to qualify.

=== Full qualifying results ===
Pos.	#	Driver	Team	Make	Time	Speed
1	24	Jeff Gordon	Hendrick Motorsports	Chevrolet	29.370	183.861
2	18	Bobby Labonte	Joe Gibbs Racing	Chevrolet	29.550	182.741
3	41	Ricky Craven (R)	Larry Hedrick Motorsports	Chevrolet	29.624	182.285
4	11	Brett Bodine	Junior Johnson & Associates	Ford	29.680	181.941
5	30	Michael Waltrip	Bahari Racing	Pontiac	29.732	181.622
6	25	Ken Schrader	Hendrick Motorsports	Chevrolet	29.749	181.519
7	4	Sterling Marlin	Morgan–McClure Motorsports	Chevrolet	29.765	181.421
8	27	Elton Sawyer	Junior Johnson & Associates	Ford	29.845	180.935
9	87	Joe Nemechek	NEMCO Motorsports	Chevrolet	29.857	180.862
10	21	Morgan Shepherd	Wood Brothers Racing	Ford	29.860	180.844
11	15	Dick Trickle	Bud Moore Engineering	Ford	29.870	180.783
12	26	Hut Stricklin	King Racing	Ford	29.874	180.759
13	5	Terry Labonte	Hendrick Motorsports	Chevrolet	29.909	180.548
14	75	Todd Bodine	Butch Mock Motorsports	Ford	29.910	180.542
15	1	Rick Mast	Precision Products Racing	Ford	29.933	180.403
16	9	Lake Speed	Melling Racing	Ford	29.933	180.403
17	97	Chad Little	Mark Rypien Motorsports	Ford	29.933	180.403
18	10	Ricky Rudd	Rudd Performance Motorsports	Ford	29.953	180.282
19	94	Bill Elliott	Elliott-Hardy Racing	Ford	29.962	180.228
20	8	Jeff Burton	Stavola Brothers Racing	Ford	29.964	180.216
Failed to lock in Round 1
21	17	Darrell Waltrip	Darrell Waltrip Motorsports	Chevrolet	29.968	180.192
22	28	Dale Jarrett	Robert Yates Racing	Ford	29.979	180.126
23	43	Bobby Hamilton	Petty Enterprises	Pontiac	29.983	180.102
24	2	Rusty Wallace	Penske Racing South	Ford	29.984	180.096
25	33	Robert Pressley (R)	Leo Jackson Motorsports	Chevrolet	29.986	180.084
26	12	Derrike Cope	Bobby Allison Motorsports	Ford	30.009	179.946
27	16	Ted Musgrave	Roush Racing	Ford	30.048	179.712
28	7	Geoff Bodine	Geoff Bodine Racing	Ford	30.095	179.432
29	90	Mike Wallace	Donlavey Racing	Ford	30.114	179.319
30	31	Ward Burton	A.G. Dillard Motorsports	Chevrolet	30.115	179.313
31	19	Loy Allen Jr.	TriStar Motorsports	Ford	30.120	179.283
32	6	Mark Martin	Roush Racing	Ford	30.143	179.146
33	32	Chuck Bown	Active Motorsports	Chevrolet	30.149	179.110
34	3	Dale Earnhardt	Richard Childress Racing	Chevrolet	30.160	179.045
35	71	Dave Marcis	Marcis Auto Racing	Chevrolet	30.226	178.654
36	37	John Andretti	Kranefuss-Haas Racing	Ford	30.241	178.566
37	81	Kenny Wallace	FILMAR Racing	Ford	30.263	178.436
38	23	Jimmy Spencer	Travis Carter Enterprises	Ford	30.269	178.400
Provisionals
39	29	Steve Grissom	Diamond Ridge Motorsports	Chevrolet	30.303	178.200
40	42	Kyle Petty	Team SABCO	Pontiac	30.333	178.024
41	22	Randy LaJoie (R)	Bill Davis Racing	Pontiac	30.324	178.077
42	98	Jeremy Mayfield	Cale Yarborough Motorsports	Ford	30.349	177.930
Failed to qualify
43	40	Greg Sacks	Team SABCO	Pontiac	30.278	178.347
44	20	Bobby Hillin Jr.	Moroso Racing	Ford	30.360	177.866
45	14	Jimmy Hensley	Hagan Racing	Ford	30.379	177.754
46	77	Davy Jones	Jasper Motorsports	Ford	30.623	176.338
47	44	Jeff Purvis	Phoenix Racing	Chevrolet	30.885	174.842
48	67	Johnny Chapman	RaDiUs Motorsports	Ford	31.310	172.469
Official first round qualifying results
Official starting lineup

== Race results ==
Fin	St	#	Driver	Team	Make	Laps	Led	Status	Pts	Winnings
1	2	18	Bobby Labonte	Joe Gibbs Racing	Chevrolet	400	85	running	180	$163,850
2	13	5	Terry Labonte	Hendrick Motorsports	Chevrolet	400	1	running	175	$93,050
3	5	30	Michael Waltrip	Bahari Racing	Pontiac	400	9	running	170	$70,650
4	7	4	Sterling Marlin	Morgan–McClure Motorsports	Chevrolet	399	31	running	165	$62,700
5	18	10	Ricky Rudd	Rudd Performance Motorsports	Ford	399	3	running	160	$49,000
6	34	3	Dale Earnhardt	Richard Childress Racing	Chevrolet	399	38	running	155	$52,500
7	12	26	Hut Stricklin	King Racing	Ford	399	0	running	146	$30,000
8	16	9	Lake Speed	Melling Racing	Ford	398	0	running	142	$27,500
9	23	43	Bobby Hamilton	Petty Enterprises	Pontiac	398	0	running	138	$25,400
10	3	41	Ricky Craven (R)	Larry Hedrick Motorsports	Chevrolet	397	0	running	134	$30,400
11	10	21	Morgan Shepherd	Wood Brothers Racing	Ford	397	7	running	135	$28,300
12	29	90	Mike Wallace	Donlavey Racing	Ford	397	0	running	127	$20,800
13	39	29	Steve Grissom	Diamond Ridge Motorsports	Chevrolet	397	0	running	124	$21,500
14	15	1	Rick Mast	Precision Products Racing	Ford	397	0	running	121	$23,300
15	27	16	Ted Musgrave	Roush Racing	Ford	397	0	running	118	$23,300
16	11	15	Dick Trickle	Bud Moore Engineering	Ford	397	0	running	115	$20,550
17	36	37	John Andretti	Kranefuss-Haas Racing	Ford	396	0	running	112	$14,600
18	21	17	Darrell Waltrip	Darrell Waltrip Motorsports	Chevrolet	396	0	running	109	$18,750
19	26	12	Derrike Cope	Bobby Allison Motorsports	Ford	396	0	running	106	$13,000
20	9	87	Joe Nemechek	NEMCO Motorsports	Chevrolet	395	0	running	103	$11,350
21	33	32	Chuck Bown	Active Motorsports	Chevrolet	394	0	running	100	$8,800
22	42	98	Jeremy Mayfield	Cale Yarborough Motorsports	Ford	394	0	running	97	$11,650
23	41	22	Randy LaJoie (R)	Bill Davis Racing	Pontiac	393	0	running	94	$16,725
24	25	33	Robert Pressley (R)	Leo Jackson Motorsports	Chevrolet	393	0	running	91	$15,820
25	8	27	Elton Sawyer	Junior Johnson & Associates	Ford	392	0	running	88	$16,300
26	28	7	Geoff Bodine	Geoff Bodine Racing	Ford	391	0	running	85	$22,000
27	38	23	Jimmy Spencer	Travis Carter Enterprises	Ford	390	0	engine	82	$10,250
28	32	6	Mark Martin	Roush Racing	Ford	390	4	running	84	$21,310
29	40	42	Kyle Petty	Team SABCO	Pontiac	380	0	running	76	$14,480
30	6	25	Ken Schrader	Hendrick Motorsports	Chevrolet	358	169	engine	83	$40,300
31	37	81	Kenny Wallace	FILMAR Racing	Ford	333	0	rear end	70	$6,750
32	22	28	Dale Jarrett	Robert Yates Racing	Ford	317	0	engine	67	$21,050
33	1	24	Jeff Gordon	Hendrick Motorsports	Chevrolet	283	37	suspension	69	$64,950
34	24	2	Rusty Wallace	Penske Racing South	Ford	258	10	handling	66	$22,500
35	4	11	Brett Bodine	Junior Johnson & Associates	Ford	230	0	accident	58	$21,950
36	31	19	Loy Allen Jr.	TriStar Motorsports	Ford	225	0	accident	55	$6,405
37	35	71	Dave Marcis	Marcis Auto Racing	Chevrolet	159	0	engine	52	$6,360
38	14	75	Todd Bodine	Butch Mock Motorsports	Ford	146	6	engine	54	$11,920
39	19	94	Bill Elliott	Elliott-Hardy Racing	Ford	134	0	accident	46	$6,320
40	20	8	Jeff Burton	Stavola Brothers Racing	Ford	134	0	camshaft	43	$11,320
41	30	31	Ward Burton	A.G. Dillard Motorsports	Chevrolet	71	0	accident	40	$6,320
42	17	97	Chad Little	Mark Rypien Motorsports	Ford	9	0	engine	37	$6,320
Official race results

Previous race: 1995 Save Mart Supermarkets 300	NASCAR Winston Cup Series; 1995 season	Next race: 1995 Miller Genuine Draft 500 (Dover)
