= Nick Harrison (racing) =

American stock car racing crew chief (1982–2019)

Personal information
- Nationality: American
- Born: Nicholas Arthur Harrison; April 29, 1982 Columbia, Tennessee, U.S.
- Died: July 21, 2019 (aged 37)
- Occupation: NASCAR crew chief
- Years active: 2006–2019

Sport
- Sport: NASCAR
- Team: Kaulig Racing

Nicholas Arthur Harrison (April 29, 1982 – July 21, 2019) was an American stock car racing crew chief, working in the role on the No. 11 Chevrolet Camaro of Kaulig Racing in the NASCAR Xfinity Series, driven by Justin Haley. Previously, Harrison had worked in the Sprint Cup Series for Phoenix Racing.

== Career ==
Harrison started his NASCAR career in the Busch Series in 2006 as crew chief for Chad Chaffin and Steadman Marlin. In 2010, Harrison joined Phoenix Racing as crew chief for Landon Cassill, and also worked with Bobby Labonte during the season. The following season, Cassill, Mike Bliss, Boris Said and Bill Elliott worked with Harrison. In 2012, Harrison worked with Kurt Busch until the final six weeks of the season, in which Busch left the team for Furniture Row Racing, and was replaced by Regan Smith.

As of the 2013 AAA 400, Harrison had served as crew chief for eleven different drivers during the season, all of whom drove for Phoenix Racing: A. J. Allmendinger, Austin Dillon, Brendan Gaughan, Owen Kelly, Jacques Villeneuve, Bobby Labonte, Regan Smith, Ryan Truex, Mike Bliss, Justin Allgaier, and Michael McDowell.

In the Nationwide Series, Harrison also served as crew chief for Ryan Newman in 2010, Landon Cassill and Jamie McMurray in 2011, Kurt Busch in 2012 and 2013, along with Jeremy Clements in 2013. With Harrison, Busch won the 2012 Subway Jalapeño 250 at Daytona International Speedway. Harrison also worked with Busch in the Camping World Truck Series in 2012 at Atlanta Motor Speedway in the Jeff Foxworthy's Grit Chips 200 for Billy Ballew Motorsports, finishing tenth.

In October 2013, Harrison announced that he was leaving Phoenix Racing following the Hollywood Casino 400 at Kansas Speedway, joining Richard Childress Racing to act as crew chief for the team's No. 33 Chevrolet Camaro in the Nationwide Series, replacing Ernie Cope. He joined the No. 3 team in 2015.

Harrison moved to Kaulig Racing's No. 11 car, driven by Justin Haley, in 2019.

== Death ==
On July 21, 2019, Harrison died at age 37 of acute intoxication from cocaine, oxycodone and alcohol. His death was ruled accidental. He had suffered from multiple health issues including hypertension, cardiovascular disease, and sleep apnea.
