= Doug George =

American racing driver and crew chief

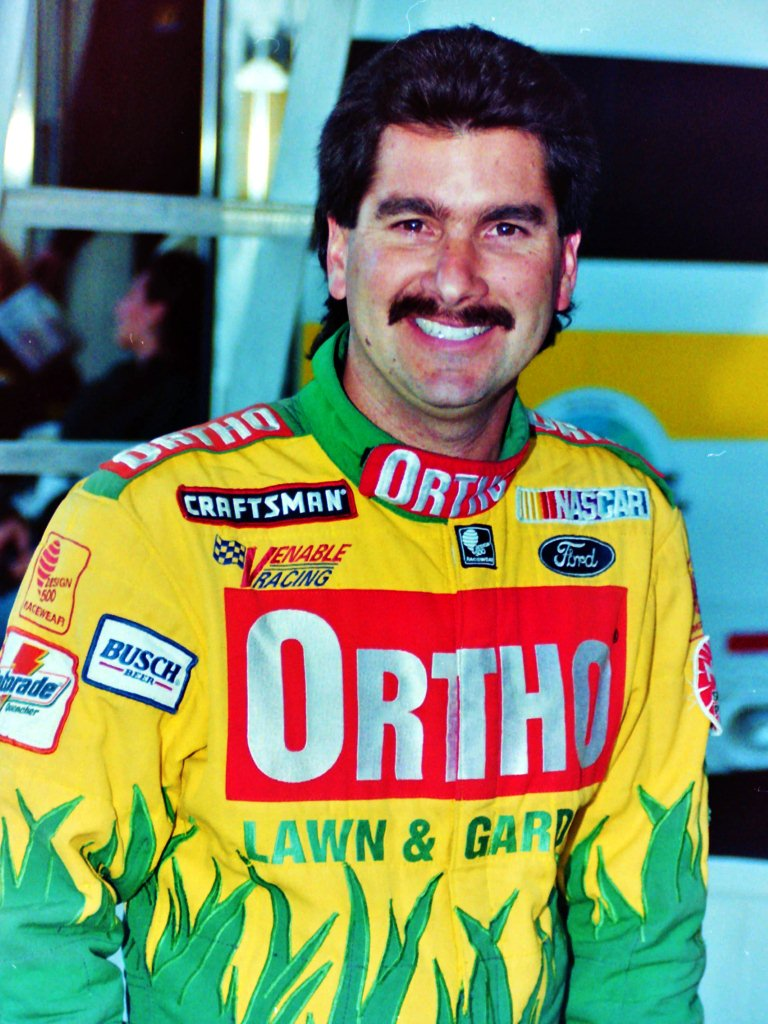
- George in 1996
- Born: Douglas Paul George; November 5, 1960 (age 66); Atwater, California, U.S.
- Achievements: 1990 NASCAR Featherlite Southwest Tour Champion; 1995 NASCAR Winston West Series Champion
- Awards: 1990 NASCAR Featherlite Southwest Tour Rookie-of-the-Year West Coast Stock Car Hall of Fame (2009)

NASCAR Cup Series career
- 2 races run over 1 year
- 1995 position: 55th
- Best finish: 55th (1995)
- First race: 1995 Save Mart Supermarkets 300 (Sears Point)
- Last race: 1995 Dura Lube 500 (Phoenix)
Wins	Top tens	Poles
0	0	0

NASCAR FedEx Freight Truck Series career
- 56 races run over 5 years
- 2000 position: 78th
- Best finish: 12th (1996)
- First race: 1996 Florida Dodge Dealers 400 (Homestead)
- Last race: 2000 Kroger 225 (Kentucky)
Wins	Top tens	Poles
0	10	0
- Statistics up to date as of June 21, 2025.

Doug George
Sport
- Country: United States
- Sport: ARCA Menards Series
- Team: 20. Nitro Motorsports

Douglas Paul George (born November 5, 1960) is an American professional stock car racing driver and crew chief in NASCAR. He serves as the crew chief of the No. 20 Nitro Motorsports Toyota Camry in the ARCA Menards Series driven by Jake Bollman.

== Racing career ==
George began racing professionally in the 1980s, driving for his own team. In 1990, he won the NASCAR Featherlite Southwest Series Rookie of the Year award. He later moved to the NASCAR Winston West Series, where he won Rookie of the Year honors and later, the 1995 series championship.

George made his NASCAR debut in 1995 at Sears Point International Raceway. Driving the No. 07 Olson Technology Ford Thunderbird, he qualified 42nd and finished 31st in the Winston Cup race. He ran an additional race that season at Phoenix International Raceway, where he finished 41st after a wreck. In 1996, he ran the Craftsman Truck Series in the No. 21 Ortho Ford F-150. He had a fifth-place run at Sears Point, and finished twelfth in the standings, runner-up to Bryan Reffner in the Rookie of the Year battle.

In 1997, George began driving the No. 12 Chevrolet Silverado for Bob Blake. He drove for a variety of teams that season, his best finish an eighth at Sonoma for Charles Hardy. He began the 1998 in the No. 26 MB Motorsports Ford, posting two thirtieth-place finishes. Late in the season, he joined Liberty Racing, driving the No. 84 Porter-Cable Power Tools Ford and had a tenth at Sonoma, before finishing the season in Liberty's No. 98 Big Daddy's BBQ Sauce Ford, where he had his worst finish with Liberty, fifteenth.

In 1999, George drove a pair of races for Conely Racing, finishing seventeenth at Gateway International Raceway. He joined Impact Motorsports as the crew chief of the No. 12 Hot Wheels Dodge Ram for Carlos Contreras in 2000. During the season, he drove Impact's No. 86 R.C. Cola truck at Gateway following the release of Mike Cope, finishing 33rd after a wreck. He drove the No. 12 truck filling in for Contreras at Kentucky, finishing sixteenth.

In 2009, George was inducted into the West Coast Stock Car Hall of Fame.

== Crew chiefing career ==
Following his driving career, George worked at Morgan-Dollar Motorsports, and later at Joe Gibbs Racing, serving as crew chief for Coy Gibbs. In 2005, he joined Xpress Motorsports and was named crew chief for the No. 19 for Regan Smith, but the team shut down after two races. He joined the No. 89 team driven by Morgan Shepherd in 2006 before the team was purchased by CJM Racing. In 2007, he returned to NASCAR as crew chief for Billy Ballew Motorsports from 2008 to 2010, working most notably with Kyle Busch. He left BBM for Kevin Harvick Incorporated in 2010 to crew chief the No. 2 truck split by Kevin Harvick and Elliott Sadler. He moved to the No. 32 Turner Motorsports team in 2011 but then left for Jason White's GB Racing team for the 2012 season. After White shut down his truck team and moved to the Nationwide Series in 2013, he served as the crew chief for rookie Gray Gaulding at NTS Motorsports in the NASCAR K&N Pro Series East. However, in September, he went back to the Truck Series crew chiefing for Dakoda Armstrong at Turn One Racing.

George returned to the K&N Series in 2014, starting the year as crew chief for Australian Brodie Kostecki's family team. After a few races, he left to return to Turner Scott Motorsports as Ron Hornaday's crew chief. When Hornaday's No. 30 team shut down in August due to lack of sponsorship, he was named crew chief for teammate Ben Kennedy's No. 31 truck, replacing Michael Shelton, who went to become the first crew chief for John Wes Townley's new team, Athenian Motorsports.

TSM closed down their truck team in 2015 and George moved to the No. 98 ThorSport Racing truck as Johnny Sauter's crew chief for the entire season. Although the team didn't win any races that year, they still finished fourth in points. Sauter left for GMS Racing in 2016, and was replaced by Rico Abreu. George remained the crew chief, but was released with a few races left in the season after the team was winless again and missed the playoffs. He was picked up by Hattori Racing Enterprises, becoming Ryan Truex's crew chief. Hattori replaced him with Scott Zipadelli in 2017, and he went to MB Motorsports to crew chief the No. 63 truck for the Donahue brothers (Kyle and Kevin) and a rotation of other drivers. He then joined BK Racing as crew chief for Corey LaJoie and the No. 83 Cup Series team, replacing Doug Richert, the team's competition director who was serving temporarily as crew chief to start the year on top of that. Later in the year, BK mostly cut back to one car due to sponsorship and financial issues with the team's owner, leaving George without a team again.

In 2018, he joined the new All Out Motorsports team as crew chief for Korbin Forrister part time. He began the 2019 season without a crew chiefing job (Wally Rogers replaced him at AOM), but soon after the start of the season, he briefly became the crew chief for the No. 44 truck of Niece Motorsports, later moving to Codie Rohrbaugh's No. 9 team, (ironically for the second time) replacing Michael Shelton after he went to Kyle Busch Motorsports. The team attempted most of the season in 2020 with Rohrbaugh and 2021 with Rohrbaugh and Grant Enfinger. In 2022, Blaine Perkins became the full-time driver of the No. 9 and the team ran a full season for the first time.

In 2025, George returned to ThorSport Racing as the crew chief of their No. 66 truck driven by Johnny Sauter, Luke Fenhaus, and Luke Baldwin. However, before the race at Pocono, ThorSport switched him to their No. 99 truck driven by Ben Rhodes, with former No. 99 crew chief Rich Lushes moving to the No. 66.

== Motorsports career results ==
=== NASCAR ===
(key) (Bold - Pole position awarded by qualifying time. Italics - Pole position earned by points standings. * – Most laps led.)

==== Winston Cup Series ====
NASCAR Winston Cup Series results
Year	Team	No.	Make	1	2	3	4	5	6	7	8	9	10	11	12	13	14	15	16	17	18	19	20	21	22	23	24	25	26	27	28	29	30	31	NWCC	Pts	Ref
1994	Olson Technology Racing	37	Ford	DAY	CAR	RCH	ATL	DAR	BRI	NWS	MAR	TAL	SON; DNQ	CLT	DOV	POC	MCH	DAY	NHA	POC	TAL	IND	GLN	MCH	BRI	DAR	RCH	DOV	MAR	NWS	CLT	CAR	PHO; DNQ	ATL	N/A	0	
1995	Olson Technology Racing	07	Ford	DAY	CAR	RCH	ATL	DAR	BRI	NWS	MAR	TAL	SON; 31	CLT	DOV	POC	MCH	DAY	NHA	POC	TAL	IND	GLN	MCH	BRI	DAR	RCH	DOV	MAR	NWS	CLT	CAR	PHO; 41	ATL	55th	110	

==== Craftsman Truck Series ====
NASCAR Craftsman Truck Series results
Year	Team	No.	Make	1	2	3	4	5	6	7	8	9	10	11	12	13	14	15	16	17	18	19	20	21	22	23	24	25	26	27	NCTC	Pts	Ref
1996	Venable Racing	21	Ford	HOM; 10	PHO; 19	POR; 14	EVG; 14	TUS; 21	CNS; 10	HPT; 17	BRI; 14	NZH; 22	MLW; 19	LVL; 18	I70; 6	IRP; 28	FLM; 15	GLN; 9	NSV; 6	RCH; 24	NHA; 21	MAR; 13	NWS; 15	SON; 5	MMR; 7	PHO; 9	LVS; 16				12th	2883	
1997	Blake Motorsports	12	Chevy	WDW; 18	TUS; 25	HOM; 17	PHO; 20	POR; 19	EVG; 17	I70; 11	NHA; 26	TEX; 29	BRI; 36																		21st	2057	
1997	SKB Racing	92	Chevy											NZH; 17	MLW; 19	LVL; 26							RCH; DNQ	MAR				PHO; 21	LVS; 21		21st	2057	
1997	Core Motorsports	32	Ford														CNS; 29	HPT	IRP												21st	2057	
1997	Genzman Racing	25	Ford																	FLM; 24											21st	2057	
1997	Doran Racing	77	Chevy																		NSV; DNQ										21st	2057	
1997	MB Motorsports	26	Ford																			GLN; DNQ									21st	2057	
1997	Charles Hardy Motorsports	35	Chevy																						SON; 8						21st	2057	
1997	Brevak Racing	34	Chevy																							MMR; 34					21st	2057	
1997	Brevak Racing	65	Ford																								CAL; 36				21st	2057	
1998	MB Motorsports	26	Ford	WDW	HOM; 33	PHO; 30	POR; 30	EVG; 32	I70; DNQ	GLN; DNQ																					34th	924	
1998	Unknown	93	Chevy								TEX; DNQ	BRI	MLW	NZH	CAL	PPR	IRP	NHA	FLM	NSV	HPT	LVL	RCH	MEM	GTY	MAR					34th	924	
1998	Liberty Racing	84	Ford																								SON; 10	MMR; 12	PHO; 14		34th	924	
1998	Liberty Racing	98	Ford																											LVS; 15	34th	924	
1999	Conely Racing	7	Chevy	HOM	PHO	EVG	MMR	MAR	MEM	PPR	I70	BRI	TEX	PIR	GLN	MLW	NSV	NZH	MCH	NHA	IRP	GTY; 17	HPT	RCH; 35	LVS	LVL	TEX	CAL			73rd	170	
2000	Impact Motorsports	86	Dodge	DAY	HOM	PHO	MMR	MAR	PIR	GTY; 33	MEM	PPR	EVG	TEX																	78th	179	
2000	Impact Motorsports	12	Dodge												KEN; 16	GLN	MLW	NHA	NZH	MCH	IRP	NSV	CIC	RCH	DOV	TEX	CAL				78th	179	

==== Winston West Series ====
NASCAR Winston West Series results
Year	Team	No.	Make	1	2	3	4	5	6	7	8	9	10	11	12	13	14	15	NWWSC	Pts	Ref
1994	Olson Technology Racing	37	Ford	MMR; 6	TUS; 11	SON; DNQ	SGS; 4	**YAK**; 18	MMR; 2	POR; 8	IND	CAJ; 3	TCR; 14	LVS; 2	MMR; 2	PHO; DNQ	TUS; 8		5th	1932	
1995	Olson Technology Racing	37	Ford	TUS; 2	MMR; 2		CNS; 2	MMR; 18	POR; 3	SGS; 2	TUS; 1	**AMP**; 1*	**MAD**; 1	**POR**; 1*	LVS; 5	SON; 1	MMR; 1		1st	2295	
1995	Olson Technology Racing	07	Ford			SON; 31												PHO; 41	1st	2295	

Achievements
Preceded by Mike Chase	NASCAR Winston West Series champion 1995	Succeeded by Lance Hooper
Preceded by Dan Press	NASCAR Featherlite Southwest Tour champion 1990	Succeeded by Rick Carelli
