= Ernie Cope =

American stock car racing driver and crew chief

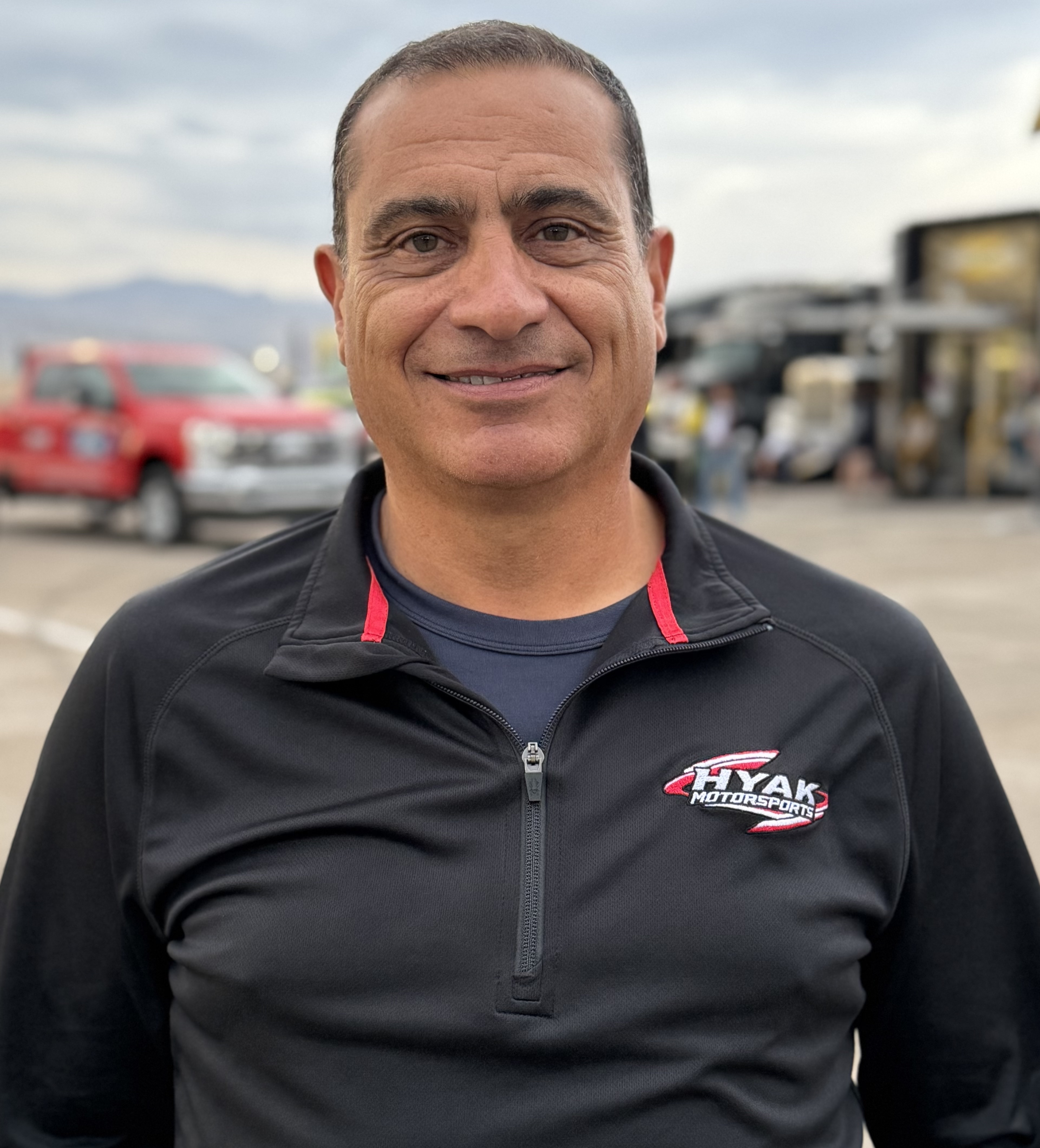
- Cope in 2025
- Born: July 17, 1969 (age 57); Tacoma, Washington, U.S.

NASCAR Cup Series career
- 1 race run over 1 year
- Best finish: 71st (1995)
- First race: 1995 Dura Lube 500 (Phoenix)
Wins	Top tens	Poles
0	0	0

NASCAR FedEx Freight Truck Series career
- 10 races run over 4 years
- Best finish: 49th (1999)
- First race: 1996 Craftsman 200 (Portland)
- Last race: 1999 Dodge California Truckstop 300 (Mesa Marin)
Wins	Top tens	Poles
0	0	0

Ernie Cope (born July 17, 1969) is currently the competition director at Hyak Motorsports. He is a former American stock car racing crew chief and a former competitor in the NASCAR Winston Cup Series, Craftsman Truck Series and Winston West Series. He is also the cousin of 1990 Daytona 500 champion, Derrike Cope.

== Driving career ==
Cope began his professional career at the age of nineteen in the NASCAR Northwest Tour, winning the series' most popular driver award in 1994. In 1995, he moved to the Winston West Series and won Rookie of the Year honors as well as the Most Popular Driver award. Also that year he attempted to make his Winston Cup debut at Sears Point Raceway, as part of a combination race between the Winston Cup and Winston West series, but failed to qualify. He was able to qualify for the fall combination race at Phoenix International Raceway; however, he qualified last in the 44 car field, taking a provisional, and was the first car out of the race, retiring after nineteen laps due to engine failure. It would be his only Cup Series start.

In 1996, Cope raced in four Craftsman Truck Series races, all in the western United States with a best finish of nineteenth at Portland International Raceway. He finished 57th in points. He made one start each in 1997 and 1998 and made four starts in 1999 with a best finish of 22nd at Evergreen Speedway; he finished 49th in points that season, his best points finish in the series.

== Crew chief career ==
Cope retired from full-time racing at the end of the 1995 season and accepted a position at Geoff Bodine Racing to crew chief the No. 7 in the Truck Series. He was Sadler Motorsports' crew chief in 2004 and served in various capacities with Robert Yates Racing in 2005. In 2006 and 2007 he was the crew chief for Wood Brothers/JTG Racing's No. 59 team in the Busch Series. In 2008, he moved to Kevin Harvick Incorporated to crew chief the No. 2 Truck Series entry driven by Jack Sprague. In 2009 and 2010, he was the crew chief for KHI's #33 Nationwide Series entry. For 2011, Cope remained with KHI, being the crew chief for Elliott Sadler; he remained with the team when it was sold to Richard Childress Racing, acting as crew chief for the No. 33 with a variety of drivers in 2012 and 2013. In addition, he substituted for Luke Lambert as crew chief for Jeff Burton in the Sprint Cup Series in early 2013. In October 2013 he left RCR, being replaced by Nick Harrison. On December 12, 2013, it was announced that Cope would become the crew chief for the No. 5 of JR Motorsports in the Nationwide Series in 2014. On August 18, 2014, Cope was announced as the crew chief of JR Motorsports' No. 9, driven by Chase Elliott, in 2015. Cope left JR Motorsports at the end of the 2015 season to become the Competition Director at JTG Daugherty Racing beginning in 2016. He substituted for Randall Burnett as crew chief for A. J. Allmendinger at the June 2016 Axalta "We Paint Winners" 400 race at Pocono Raceway.

== Motorsports career results ==
=== NASCAR ===
(key) (Bold - Pole position awarded by time. Italics - Pole position earned by points standings. * – Most laps led.)

==== Winston Cup Series ====
NASCAR Winston Cup Series results
Year	Team	No.	Make	1	2	3	4	5	6	7	8	9	10	11	12	13	14	15	16	17	18	19	20	21	22	23	24	25	26	27	28	29	30	31	NWCC	Pts	Ref
1995	Lew Miller Racing	19	Chevy	DAY	CAR	RCH	ATL	DAR	BRI	NWS	MAR	TAL	SON; DNQ	CLT	DOV	POC	MCH	DAY	NHA	POC	TAL	IND	GLN	MCH	BRI	DAR	RCH	DOV	MAR	NWS	CLT	CAR	PHO; 44	ATL	71st	31	

==== Craftsman Truck Series ====
NASCAR Craftsman Truck Series results
Year	Team	No.	Make	1	2	3	4	5	6	7	8	9	10	11	12	13	14	15	16	17	18	19	20	21	22	23	24	25	26	27	NCTSC	Pts	Ref
1996	Ernie Cope Racing	38	Chevy	HOM	PHO	POR; 19	EVG; 28	TUS; 27	CNS; 31	HPT	BRI	NZH	MLW	LVL	I70	IRP	FLM	GLN	NSV	RCH	NHA	MAR	NWS	SON	MMR	PHO	LVS				57th	337	
1997	Blake Motorsports	12	Chevy	WDW	TUS	HOM	PHO	POR	EVG	I70	NHA	TEX	BRI	NZH	MLW	LVL	CNS	HPT	IRP	FLM	NSV	GLN	RCH	MAR; 20	SON	MMR	CAL	PHO	LVS		106th	103	
1998	Gloy/Rahal Racing	55	Ford	WDW	HOM	PHO	POR	EVG; 24	I70	GLN	TEX	BRI	MLW	NZH	CAL	PPR	IRP	NHA	FLM	NSV	HPT	LVL	RCH	MEM	GTY	MAR	SON	MMR	PHO	LVS	93rd	91	
1999	CJ Racing	27	Ford	HOM; 32	PHO; 29	EVG; 22	MMR; 25	MAR	MEM	PPR	I70	BRI	TEX	PIR	GLN	MLW	NSV	NZH	MCH	NHA	IRP	GTY	HPT	RCH	LVS	LVL	TEX	CAL			49th	328	
