= 1995 Miller Genuine Draft 500 (Dover) =

12th race of the 1995 NASCAR Winston Cup Series

Race details
- Race 12 of 31 in the 1995 NASCAR Winston Cup Series
- The 1995 Miller Genuine Draft 500 program cover, featuring Rusty Wallace. Artwork by NASCAR artist Sam Bass.
- Date: June 4, 1995
- Official name: 27th Annual Miller Genuine Draft 500
- Location: Dover, Delaware, Dover International Speedway
- Course: Permanent racing facility
- Course length: 1 miles (1.6 km)
- Distance: 500 laps, 500 mi (804.672 km)
- Scheduled distance: 500 laps, 500 mi (804.672 km)
- Average speed: 119.88 miles per hour (192.93 km/h)

Pole position
Driver	Jeff Gordon	Hendrick Motorsports
- Time: 23.427

Most laps led
Driver	Kyle Petty	Team SABCO
- Laps: 271

Winner
No. 42	Kyle Petty	Team SABCO

Television in the United States
- Network: TNN
- Announcers: Mike Joy, Dick Berggren, Buddy Baker

Radio in the United States
- Radio: Motor Racing Network

The 1995 Miller Genuine Draft 500 was the 12th stock car race of the 1995 NASCAR Winston Cup Series and the 27th iteration of the event. The race was held on Sunday, June 4, 1995, in Dover, Delaware at Dover International Speedway, a 1-mile (1.6 km) permanent oval-shaped racetrack. The race took the scheduled 500 laps to complete. Ending a two-year long winless drought, Team SABCO driver Kyle Petty would manage to dominate a majority of the race to take his eighth and final career NASCAR Winston Cup Series victory and his only victory of the season. To fill out the top three, Joe Gibbs Racing driver Bobby Labonte and Roush Racing driver Ted Musgrave would finish second and third, respectively.

== Background ==
The layout of Dover International Speedway, the venue where the race was held.

Dover International Speedway is an oval race track in Dover, Delaware, United States that has held at least two NASCAR races since it opened in 1969. In addition to NASCAR, the track also hosted USAC and the NTT IndyCar Series. The track features one layout, a 1-mile (1.6 km) concrete oval, with 24° banking in the turns and 9° banking on the straights. The speedway is owned and operated by Dover Motorsports.

The track, nicknamed "The Monster Mile", was built in 1969 by Melvin Joseph of Melvin L. Joseph Construction Company, Inc., with an asphalt surface, but was replaced with concrete in 1995. Six years later in 2001, the track's capacity moved to 135,000 seats, making the track have the largest capacity of sports venue in the mid-Atlantic. In 2002, the name changed to Dover International Speedway from Dover Downs International Speedway after Dover Downs Gaming and Entertainment split, making Dover Motorsports. From 2007 to 2009, the speedway worked on an improvement project called "The Monster Makeover", which expanded facilities at the track and beautified the track. After the 2014 season, the track's capacity was reduced to 95,500 seats.

=== Entry list ===
- (R) denotes rookie driver.

#	Driver	Team	Make
1	Rick Mast	Precision Products Racing	Pontiac
2	Rusty Wallace	Penske Racing South	Ford
3	Dale Earnhardt	Richard Childress Racing	Chevrolet
4	Sterling Marlin	Morgan–McClure Motorsports	Chevrolet
5	Terry Labonte	Hendrick Motorsports	Chevrolet
6	Mark Martin	Roush Racing	Ford
7	Geoff Bodine	Geoff Bodine Racing	Ford
8	Jeff Burton	Stavola Brothers Racing	Ford
9	Lake Speed	Melling Racing	Ford
10	Ricky Rudd	Rudd Performance Motorsports	Ford
11	Brett Bodine	Junior Johnson & Associates	Ford
12	Derrike Cope	Bobby Allison Motorsports	Ford
15	Dick Trickle	Bud Moore Engineering	Ford
16	Ted Musgrave	Roush Racing	Ford
17	Darrell Waltrip	Darrell Waltrip Motorsports	Chevrolet
18	Bobby Labonte	Joe Gibbs Racing	Chevrolet
19	Loy Allen Jr.	TriStar Motorsports	Ford
21	Morgan Shepherd	Wood Brothers Racing	Ford
22	Randy LaJoie (R)	Bill Davis Racing	Pontiac
23	Jimmy Spencer	Haas-Carter Motorsports	Ford
24	Jeff Gordon	Hendrick Motorsports	Chevrolet
25	Ken Schrader	Hendrick Motorsports	Chevrolet
26	Hut Stricklin	King Racing	Ford
27	Elton Sawyer	Junior Johnson & Associates	Ford
28	Dale Jarrett	Robert Yates Racing	Ford
29	Steve Grissom	Diamond Ridge Motorsports	Chevrolet
30	Michael Waltrip	Bahari Racing	Pontiac
31	Ward Burton	A.G. Dillard Motorsports	Chevrolet
32	Chuck Bown	Active Motorsports	Chevrolet
33	Robert Pressley (R)	Leo Jackson Motorsports	Chevrolet
37	John Andretti	Kranefuss-Haas Racing	Ford
40	Greg Sacks	Dick Brooks Racing	Pontiac
41	Ricky Craven (R)	Larry Hedrick Motorsports	Chevrolet
42	Kyle Petty	Team SABCO	Pontiac
43	Bobby Hamilton	Petty Enterprises	Pontiac
71	Dave Marcis	Marcis Auto Racing	Chevrolet
75	Todd Bodine	Butch Mock Motorsports	Ford
77	Bobby Hillin Jr.	Jasper Motorsports	Ford
79	Doug French	Waters Racing	Chevrolet
81	Kenny Wallace	FILMAR Racing	Ford
87	Joe Nemechek	NEMCO Motorsports	Chevrolet
90	Mike Wallace	Donlavey Racing	Ford
94	Bill Elliott	Elliott-Hardy Racing	Ford
98	Jeremy Mayfield	Cale Yarborough Motorsports	Ford

== Qualifying ==
Qualifying was split into two rounds. The first round was held on Friday, June 2, at 3:00 pm EST. Each driver would have one lap to set a time. During the first round, the top 20 drivers in the round would be guaranteed a starting spot in the race. If a driver was not able to guarantee a spot in the first round, they had the option to scrub their time from the first round and try and run a faster lap time in a second round qualifying run, held on Saturday, June 3, at 11:30 am EST. As with the first round, each driver would have one lap to set a time. For this specific race, positions 21–38 would be decided on time, and depending on who needed it, a select amount of positions were given to cars who had not otherwise qualified but were high enough in owner's points; which was usually four. If needed, a past champion who did not qualify on either time or provisionals could use a champion's provisional, adding one more spot to the field.

Jeff Gordon, driving for Hendrick Motorsports, won the pole, setting a time of 23.427 and an average speed of 153.669 miles per hour (247.306 km/h) in the first round.

Two drivers would fail to qualify.

=== Full qualifying results ===
Pos.	#	Driver	Team	Make	Time	Speed
1	24	Jeff Gordon	Hendrick Motorsports	Chevrolet	23.427	153.669
2	31	Ward Burton	A.G. Dillard Motorsports	Chevrolet	23.593	152.588
3	18	Bobby Labonte	Joe Gibbs Racing	Chevrolet	23.685	151.995
4	37	John Andretti	Kranefuss-Haas Racing	Ford	23.696	151.924
5	4	Sterling Marlin	Morgan–McClure Motorsports	Chevrolet	23.722	151.758
6	7	Geoff Bodine	Geoff Bodine Racing	Ford	23.750	151.579
7	41	Ricky Craven (R)	Larry Hedrick Motorsports	Chevrolet	23.810	151.197
8	87	Joe Nemechek	NEMCO Motorsports	Chevrolet	23.817	151.153
9	26	Hut Stricklin	King Racing	Ford	23.829	151.076
10	11	Brett Bodine	Junior Johnson & Associates	Ford	23.837	151.026
11	23	Jimmy Spencer	Travis Carter Enterprises	Ford	23.851	150.937
12	30	Michael Waltrip	Bahari Racing	Pontiac	23.860	150.880
13	6	Mark Martin	Roush Racing	Ford	23.906	150.590
14	43	Bobby Hamilton	Petty Enterprises	Pontiac	23.907	150.584
15	21	Morgan Shepherd	Wood Brothers Racing	Ford	23.914	150.539
16	2	Rusty Wallace	Penske Racing South	Ford	23.927	150.458
17	1	Rick Mast	Precision Products Racing	Ford	23.947	150.332
18	28	Dale Jarrett	Robert Yates Racing	Ford	23.973	150.169
19	5	Terry Labonte	Hendrick Motorsports	Chevrolet	23.979	150.131
20	94	Bill Elliott	Elliott-Hardy Racing	Ford	23.987	150.081
Failed to lock in Round 1
21	8	Jeff Burton	Stavola Brothers Racing	Ford	23.726	151.732
22	22	Randy LaJoie (R)	Bill Davis Racing	Pontiac	23.834	151.045
23	3	Dale Earnhardt	Richard Childress Racing	Chevrolet	23.877	150.773
24	15	Dick Trickle	Bud Moore Engineering	Ford	23.990	150.063
25	71	Dave Marcis	Marcis Auto Racing	Chevrolet	24.016	149.900
26	75	Todd Bodine	Butch Mock Motorsports	Ford	24.032	149.800
27	27	Elton Sawyer	Junior Johnson & Associates	Ford	24.066	149.589
28	77	Bobby Hillin Jr.	Jasper Motorsports	Ford	24.085	149.471
29	10	Ricky Rudd	Rudd Performance Motorsports	Ford	24.097	149.396
30	32	Chuck Bown	Active Motorsports	Chevrolet	24.113	149.297
31	90	Mike Wallace	Donlavey Racing	Ford	24.114	149.291
32	16	Ted Musgrave	Roush Racing	Ford	24.130	149.192
33	33	Robert Pressley (R)	Leo Jackson Motorsports	Chevrolet	24.131	149.180
34	9	Lake Speed	Melling Racing	Ford	24.137	149.149
35	81	Kenny Wallace	FILMAR Racing	Ford	24.141	149.124
36	29	Steve Grissom	Diamond Ridge Motorsports	Chevrolet	24.143	149.112
37	42	Kyle Petty	Team SABCO	Pontiac	24.144	149.007
38	98	Jeremy Mayfield	Cale Yarborough Motorsports	Ford	24.164	148.982
Provisionals
39	17	Darrell Waltrip	Darrell Waltrip Motorsports	Chevrolet	-*	-*
40	25	Ken Schrader	Hendrick Motorsports	Chevrolet	-*	-*
41	12	Derrike Cope	Bobby Allison Motorsports	Ford	-*	-*
42	40	Greg Sacks	Dick Brooks Racing	Pontiac	-*	-*
Failed to qualify
43	79	Doug French	Waters Racing	Chevrolet	-*	-*
44	19	Loy Allen Jr.	TriStar Motorsports	Ford	-*	-*
Official first round qualifying results
Official starting lineup

== Race results ==
Fin	St	#	Driver	Team	Make	Laps	Led	Status	Pts	Winnings
1	37	42	Kyle Petty	Team SABCO	Pontiac	500	271	running	185	$77,665
2	3	18	Bobby Labonte	Joe Gibbs Racing	Chevrolet	500	18	running	175	$61,555
3	32	16	Ted Musgrave	Roush Racing	Ford	500	2	running	170	$43,305
4	9	26	Hut Stricklin	King Racing	Ford	500	23	running	165	$35,615
5	23	3	Dale Earnhardt	Richard Childress Racing	Chevrolet	500	10	running	160	$45,545
6	1	24	Jeff Gordon	Hendrick Motorsports	Chevrolet	499	132	running	155	$37,890
7	5	4	Sterling Marlin	Morgan–McClure Motorsports	Chevrolet	499	0	running	146	$30,540
8	12	30	Michael Waltrip	Bahari Racing	Pontiac	499	0	running	142	$26,440
9	16	2	Rusty Wallace	Penske Racing South	Ford	499	0	running	138	$31,490
10	8	87	Joe Nemechek	NEMCO Motorsports	Chevrolet	499	1	running	139	$19,440
11	40	25	Ken Schrader	Hendrick Motorsports	Chevrolet	498	0	running	130	$24,540
12	41	12	Derrike Cope	Bobby Allison Motorsports	Ford	498	0	running	127	$18,940
13	17	1	Rick Mast	Precision Products Racing	Ford	498	0	running	124	$23,540
14	31	90	Mike Wallace	Donlavey Racing	Ford	496	0	running	121	$18,140
15	20	94	Bill Elliott	Elliott-Hardy Racing	Ford	496	0	running	118	$18,940
16	36	29	Steve Grissom	Diamond Ridge Motorsports	Chevrolet	496	0	running	115	$17,390
17	38	98	Jeremy Mayfield	Cale Yarborough Motorsports	Ford	496	0	running	112	$17,165
18	35	81	Kenny Wallace	FILMAR Racing	Ford	496	0	running	109	$13,350
19	33	33	Robert Pressley (R)	Leo Jackson Motorsports	Chevrolet	495	0	running	106	$22,865
20	39	17	Darrell Waltrip	Darrell Waltrip Motorsports	Chevrolet	494	0	running	103	$23,215
21	10	11	Brett Bodine	Junior Johnson & Associates	Ford	494	0	running	100	$26,165
22	7	41	Ricky Craven (R)	Larry Hedrick Motorsports	Chevrolet	488	0	running	97	$17,015
23	22	22	Randy LaJoie (R)	Bill Davis Racing	Pontiac	486	0	running	94	$21,365
24	14	43	Bobby Hamilton	Petty Enterprises	Pontiac	478	0	running	91	$16,215
25	21	8	Jeff Burton	Stavola Brothers Racing	Ford	461	0	running	88	$21,765
26	15	21	Morgan Shepherd	Wood Brothers Racing	Ford	449	0	running	85	$20,915
27	6	7	Geoff Bodine	Geoff Bodine Racing	Ford	446	0	running	82	$27,465
28	42	40	Greg Sacks	Dick Brooks Racing	Pontiac	445	0	running	79	$17,815
29	11	23	Jimmy Spencer	Travis Carter Enterprises	Ford	437	0	running	76	$15,765
30	26	75	Todd Bodine	Butch Mock Motorsports	Ford	436	0	running	73	$20,215
31	29	10	Ricky Rudd	Rudd Performance Motorsports	Ford	436	0	running	70	$25,665
32	24	15	Dick Trickle	Bud Moore Engineering	Ford	427	0	running	67	$17,605
33	30	32	Chuck Bown	Active Motorsports	Chevrolet	418	0	running	64	$12,555
34	34	9	Lake Speed	Melling Racing	Ford	405	0	running	61	$12,505
35	13	6	Mark Martin	Roush Racing	Ford	392	0	running	58	$26,305
36	25	71	Dave Marcis	Marcis Auto Racing	Chevrolet	315	0	crash	55	$12,280
37	19	5	Terry Labonte	Hendrick Motorsports	Chevrolet	290	0	engine	52	$27,080
38	2	31	Ward Burton	A.G. Dillard Motorsports	Chevrolet	149	43	crash	54	$12,680
39	4	37	John Andretti	Kranefuss-Haas Racing	Ford	2	0	crash	46	$13,280
40	18	28	Dale Jarrett	Robert Yates Racing	Ford	2	0	crash	43	$26,680
41	27	27	Elton Sawyer	Junior Johnson & Associates	Ford	2	0	crash	40	$20,280
42	28	77	Bobby Hillin Jr.	Jasper Motorsports	Ford	2	0	crash	37	$12,780
Official race results

Previous race: 1995 Coca-Cola 600	NASCAR Winston Cup Series; 1995 season	Next race: 1995 UAW-GM Teamwork 500
