= Precision Products Racing =

Former NASCAR team

- Owner: Richard Jackson
- Base: Denver, North Carolina
- Series: Winston Cup, Busch Series, Automobile Racing Club of America
- Manufacturer: Oldsmobile, Pontiac, Ford
- Opened: 1990
- Closed: 2001

Career
- Drivers' Championships: 0
- Race victories: 0

Precision Products Racing (PPR) was a NASCAR team that competed regularly from 1990 to 1998. It was owned by Richard Jackson and based in Asheville, North Carolina. The team officially closed after the 2001 season following a part-time schedule in the ARCA RE/MAX Series.

== Winston Cup ==
Precision Products Racing was formed by Jackson in 1990, following his departure from a team he co-owned with his brother Leo. The team debuted at the 1990 Daytona 500 with the #1 Skoal Classic Oldsmobile driven by Terry Labonte. In the team's debut, Labonte led seven laps and finished 2nd. Labonte would go on to have eight additional top-ten finishes and ended the season fifteenth in the overall standings. PPR also fielded a second car on the Series' two road course races, the #0 driven by Irv Hoerr, who finished in the top-ten on both occasions.

Labonte departed the team at season's end and was replaced by Rick Mast for 1991. His best finish that season was a 4th at the Daytona 500, and he picked up two additional top-ten finishes, earning a twenty-first place points finish. In 1992, Mast had one top-ten finish and also won the team's first pole position at the season-ending Hooters 500. He was eliminated from competition after being involved in a Lap 1 wreck with Brett Bodine and Hut Stricklin. PPR also fielded a second car for the final time in its history at Sears Point Raceway, where Hoerr finished 41st following an engine failure. The team would switch to Ford in 1993, with Mast earning five top-ten finishes, his best finish being a 5th at Bristol Motor Speedway. Mast and PPR had a banner year in the 1994 NASCAR Winston Cup Series, finishing in the top-ten a career-high ten times, and finishing 2nd at Rockingham Speedway, losing narrowly to Dale Earnhardt. Mast also won his second career pole at Indianapolis Motor Speedway for the inaugural Brickyard 400, the first time stock cars ran at the historic speedway. PPR ended the season 18th in the championship standings. The team only finished in the top-ten 3 times in 1995, earning one pole at Dover Downs International Speedway and dropping to 21st in points.

In 1996, PPR began fielding Pontiacs for Mast and also signed Hooters as a primary sponsor, replacing Skoal. In his final season with the team, Mast had five top-ten finishes, three of which came in a row, and moved back up to 18th in the standings. Both he and Hooters left the team at season's end. Morgan Shepherd was signed as driver for 1997 with Delco Remy America and Crusin' America Phone Cards as the initial sponsors. Although Shepherd had two top-tens in the first four races, the team quickly struggled and Shepherd left for Jasper Motorsports fourteen races into the season, citing concerns over the team's financial situation, during which time R+L Carriers joined as permanent primary sponsor for the #1 car. He was replaced by rookie driver and team spotter Jerry Nadeau, who ran five races with a best finish of thirtieth before leaving the team. After failing to qualify for the 1997 Brickyard 400 with Mike Wallace, PPR's chassis specialist Lance Hooper took over as driver for the next 6 races, failing to qualify at New Hampshire and earning a best finish of 24th twice. Shepherd returned for the last part of the season, missing the field twice and finishing no higher than 12th.

For 1998, Jackson swapped numbers with Dale Earnhardt, Inc. (DEI), with DEI getting car number 1 and Jackson car number 14. PPR attempted the 1998 Daytona 500 with Loy Allen Jr. with Delco Remy sponsoring, but failed to qualify following an accident in the team's qualifying race. Spending most of the season on the team's NASCAR Busch Grand National Series operation, Jackson only attempted one more Winston Cup race, the Brickyard 400 with Hooper, but again did not qualify. This was Jackson's last involvement with Winston Cup until 2001, when he served as the crew chief for Hooper's #47 J. J. Baker Custom Homes Ford, owned by Dark Horse Motorsports. The team qualified for one of the four races it attempted over the next two years.

=== Car No. 1 results ===
Year	Driver	No.	Make	1	2	3	4	5	6	7	8	9	10	11	12	13	14	15	16	17	18	19	20	21	22	23	24	25	26	27	28	29	30	31	32	33	Owners	Pts
1990	Terry Labonte	1	Olds	DAY; 2	RCH; 32	CAR; 9	ATL; 40	DAR; 14	BRI; 4	NWS; 15	MAR; 31	TAL; 6	CLT; 13	DOV; 13	SON; 35	POC; 20	MCH; 7	DAY; 4	POC; 10	TAL; 42	GLN; 14	MCH; 14	BRI; 4	DAR; 14	RCH; 17	DOV; 15	MAR; 9	NWS; 27	CLT; 17	CAR; 13	PHO; 13	ATL; 21					16th	3371
1991	Rick Mast	1	Olds	DAY; 4	RCH; 35	CAR; 30	ATL; 29	DAR; 13	BRI; 18	NWS; 12	MAR; 13	TAL; 10	CLT; 30	DOV; 20	SON; 19	POC; 25	MCH; 29	DAY; 19	POC; 27	TAL; 28	GLN; 35	MCH; 18	BRI; 26	DAR; 11	RCH; 27	DOV; 9	MAR; 13	NWS; 25	CLT; 13	CAR; 18	PHO; 28	ATL; 28					21st	2918
1992	Rick Mast	1	Olds	DAY; 13	CAR; 12	RCH; 18	ATL; 22	DAR; 17	BRI; 30	NWS; 23	MAR; 14	TAL; 17	CLT; 23	DOV; 32	SON; 11	POC; 30	MCH; 28	DAY; 17	POC; 24	TAL; 26	GLN; 32	MCH; 13	BRI; 29	DAR; 23	RCH; 28	DOV; 24	MAR; 9	NWS; 21	CLT; 35	CAR; 17	PHO; 17	ATL; 28					23rd	2830
1993	Rick Mast	1	Ford	DAY; 12	CAR; 39	RCH; 35	ATL; 30	DAR; 15	BRI; 10	NWS; 19	MAR; 11	TAL; 13	SON; 29	CLT; 31	DOV; 6	POC; 16	MCH; 11	DAY; 16	NHA; 16	POC; 36	TAL; 38	GLN; 37	MCH; 33	BRI; 5	DAR; 32	RCH; 18	DOV; 18	MAR; 26	NWS; 8	CLT; 18	CAR; 17	PHO; 10	ATL; 37				21st	3001
1994	Rick Mast	1	Ford	DAY; 27	CAR; 3	RCH; 7	ATL; 26	DAR; 37	BRI; 29	NWS; 10	MAR; 8	TAL; 20	SON; 34	CLT; 31	DOV; 30	POC; 9	MCH; 13	DAY; 29	NHA; 9	POC; 40	TAL; 20	IND; 22	GLN; 38	MCH; 3	BRI; 10	DAR; 20	RCH; 33	DOV; 15	MAR; 29	NWS; 3	CLT; 12	CAR; 2	PHO; 42	ATL; 27			19th	3238
1995	Rick Mast	1	Ford	DAY; 21	CAR; 35	RCH; 34	ATL; 11	DAR; 26	BRI; 15	NWS; 8	MAR; 34	TAL; 28	SON; 16	CLT; 14	DOV; 13	POC; 21	MCH; 34	DAY; 26	NHA; 11	POC; 13	TAL; 17	IND; 8	GLN; 37	MCH; 31	BRI; 26	DAR; 26	RCH; 12	DOV; 28	MAR; 28	NWS; 26	CLT; 36	CAR; 34*	PHO; 9	ATL; 21			21st	2984
1996	Rick Mast	1	Pontiac	DAY; 28	CAR; 10	RCH; 19	ATL; 34	DAR; 19	BRI; 12	NWS; 14	MAR; 15	TAL; 15	SON; 19	CLT; 12	DOV; 35	POC; 28	MCH; 18	DAY; 20	NHA; 13	POC; 30	TAL; 41	IND; 9	GLN; 27	MCH; 16	BRI; 35	DAR; 22	RCH; 19	DOV; 6	MAR; 4	NWS; 6	CLT; 15	CAR; 38	PHO; 38	ATL; 13			18th	3190
1997	Morgan Shepherd	1	Pontiac	DAY; 29	CAR; 10	RCH; 43	ATL; 3	DAR; 12	TEX; 24	BRI; 28	MAR; 35	SON; 23	TAL; 28	CLT; 9	DOV; 38	POC; 12													DOV; 31	MAR; DNQ	CLT; 22	TAL; 12	CAR; 34	PHO; DNQ	ATL; 27		38th	2033
1997	Jerry Nadeau	1	Pontiac														MCH; 36	CAL; 38	DAY; 30	NHA; 39	POC; 33																38th	2033
1997	Mike Wallace	1	Pontiac																			IND; DNQ															38th	2033
1997	Lance Hooper	1	Pontiac																				GLN; 24	MCH; 34	BRI; 24	DAR; 35	RCH; 33	NHA; DNQ									38th	2033
1998	Loy Allen Jr.	14	Pontiac	DAY; DNQ	CAR	LVS	ATL	DAR	BRI	TEX	MAR	TAL	CAL	CLT	DOV	RCH	MCH	POC	SON	NHA	POC																NA	-
1998	Lance Hooper	14	Pontiac																			IND; DNQ	GLN	MCH	BRI	NHA	DAR	RCH	DOV	MAR	CLT	TAL	DAY	PHO	CAR	ATL	NA	-

== Busch Series ==
Jackson's first involvement in NASCAR came in 1982 when he fielded an entry for his daughter Lisa. She ran at Asheville Speedway in her only career start, finishing 17th.

PPR joined the Busch Series on a part-time basis in 1992 ten years later, when it fielded the #0 Skoal Classic/Majik Mart Oldsmobile for Mast, who had two sixth-place finishes and three overall top-tens out of eleven starts. Mast ran five times for PPR's Busch team in 1993, earning a pole and three top-ten finishes. In addition, Tommy Houston made one start for the team at Nazareth Speedway, and Robert Pressley finished the season for Jackson following his release from Alliance Motorsports, finishing in the top-ten twice.

In 1998, Jackson chose to move his team down to the Busch Series permanently after being unable to find regular sponsorship for his Cup team, fielding the #23 World Championship Wrestling Pontiac for Hooper. Running a part-time schedule, Hooper had a 2nd-place qualifying effort at Richmond, but did not finish higher than 18th that year. The team suspended its NASCAR operations after the season.

== ARCA ==
PPR made its debut in the ARCA Bondo/Mar-Hyde Series in 1997, fielding the #01 Precision Products/Bussman Pontiac for Nadeau. Running two consecutive races at Charlotte Motor Speedway, Nadeau finished fourth and second respectively. The team returned to the series in 1999, initially with the #47 Lucas Oil Pontiac for Hooper, who had two top-ten finishes. Later in the season, PPR fielded the #90 Invincible Sportswear Ford for IRL driver Jon Herb at the schedule's two dirt tracks (Illinois and Du Quoin State Fairgrounds), but Herb finished well off the lead lap both times, and failed to qualify for his first asphalt attempt at Atlanta.

Jackson and Herb returned to Automobile Racing Club of America (ARCA) in 2000 on a more regular basis in the #47 car with Invincible Sportswear and WorldBestBuy.com sponsoring. Herb had nine top-twenty finishes, his best overall standing being eleventh on three separate races. PPR's final race came at Daytona in 2001, when Herb crashed after 29 laps and finished 35th.
