= Bill McAnally =

American racing driver and team owner

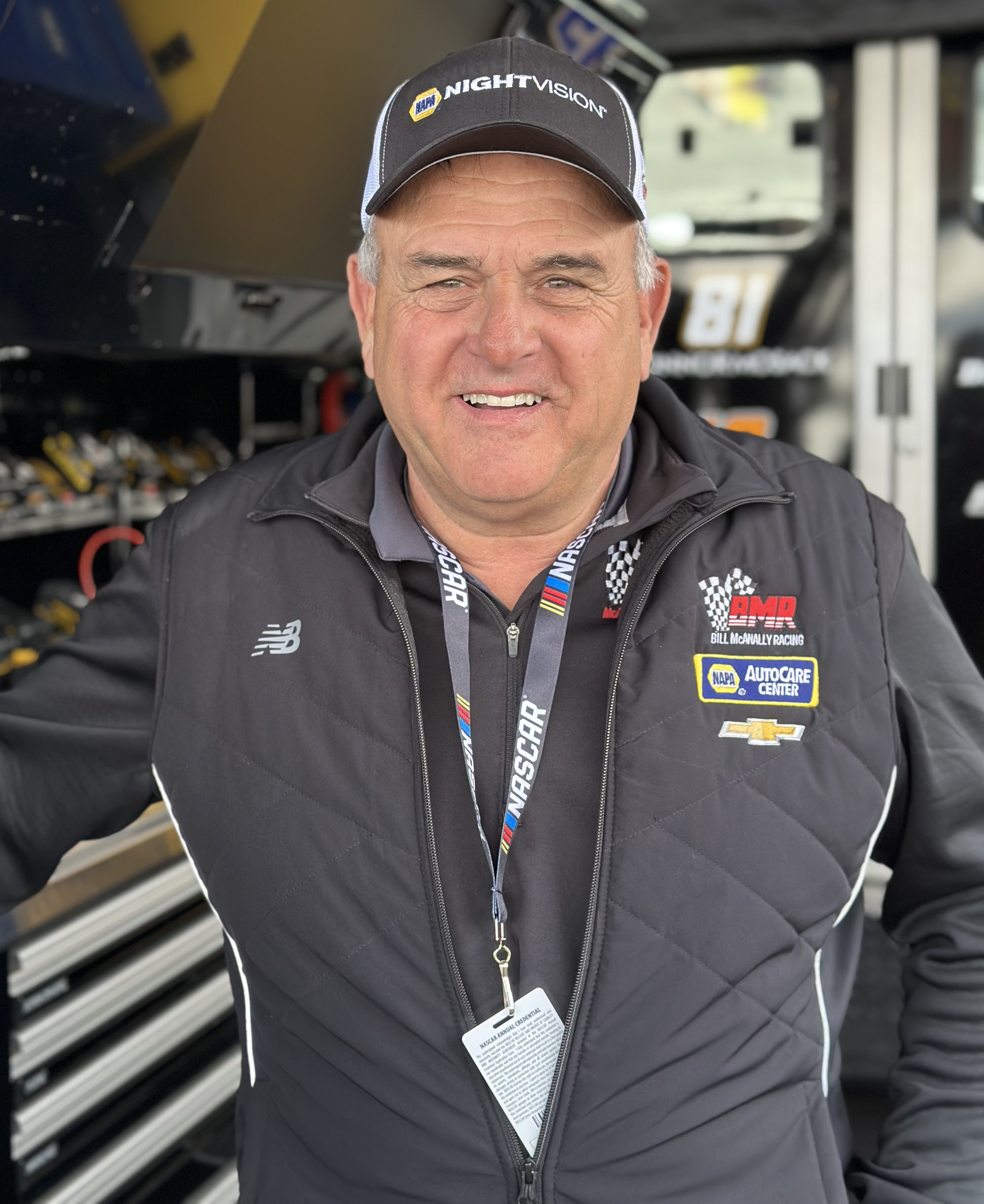
- McAnally at Las Vegas Motor Speedway in 2025
- Born: William L. McAnally; August 28, 1965 (age 61); Roseville, California, U.S.

ARCA Menards Series West career
- 56 races run over 7 years
- Best finish: 7th (1997)
- First race: 1992 Holiday Quality Foods 200 (Shasta)
- Last race: 1998 Auto Club 200 (Fontana)
Wins	Top tens	Poles
0	16	0
- Statistics up to date as of November 19, 2024.

William L. McAnally (born August 28, 1965) is an American former professional stock car racing driver and team owner who is the owner of Bill McAnally Racing, which currently competes in the NASCAR Craftsman Truck Series under the McAnally–Hilgemann Racing banner, and in the ARCA Menards Series West. He competed in the West Series from 1992 to 1998, getting sixteen top-ten finishes and a best points finish of seventh in 1997 before retiring in 1999.

McAnally also attempted three races in the NASCAR Winston Cup Series in 1996 and 1997, all combination races with the West series, where he failed to qualify for all three.

== Motorsports results ==
=== NASCAR ===
(key) (Bold - Pole position awarded by qualifying time. Italics - Pole position earned by points standings or practice time. * – Most laps led.)

==== Winston Cup Series ====
NASCAR Winston Cup Series results
Year	Team	No.	Make	1	2	3	4	5	6	7	8	9	10	11	12	13	14	15	16	17	18	19	20	21	22	23	24	25	26	27	28	29	30	31	32	NWCC	Pts	Ref
1996	Bill McAnally Racing	02	Chevy	DAY	CAR	RCH	ATL	DAR	BRI	NWS	MAR	TAL	SON; DNQ	CLT	DOV	POC	MCH	DAY	NHA	POC	TAL	IND	GLN	MCH	BRI	DAR	RCH	DOV	MAR	NWS	CLT	CAR	PHO; DNQ	ATL		N/A	0	
1997	Bill McAnally Racing	16W	Chevy	DAY	CAR	RCH	ATL	DAR	TEX	BRI	MAR	SON; DNQ	TAL	CLT	DOV	POC	MCH	CAL	DAY	NHA	POC	IND	GLN	MCH	BRI	DAR	RCH	NHA	DOV	MAR	CLT	TAL	CAR	PHO	ATL	N/A	0	

==== Winston West Series ====
NASCAR Winston West Series results
Year	Team	No.	Make	1	2	3	4	5	6	7	8	9	10	11	12	13	14	15	NWWSC	Pts	Ref
1992	Bill McAnally Racing	12	Pontiac	MMR	SGS	SON	SHA; 15	POR	EVG	SSS	CAJ	TWS	MMR; 19	PHO					29th	224	
1993	Bill McAnally Racing	12	Pontiac	TWS	MMR; 16	SGS	SON	TUS	SHA; 13	EVG	POR	CBS; 7	SSS	CAJ; 4	TCR				19th	642	
1993	Bill McAnally Racing	12W	Pontiac													MMR; 22	PHO		19th	642	
1994	Bill McAnally Racing	4	Pontiac	MMR; 18															22nd	755	
1994	Bill McAnally Racing	9	Pontiac		TUS; 12	SON	SGS	YAK	MMR	POR	IND								22nd	755	
1994	Bill McAnally Racing	12	Chevy									CAJ; 17	TCR	LVS; 12	MMR; 4	PHO	TUS; 16		22nd	755	
1995	Bill McAnally Racing	2	Chevy	TUS; 19	MMR; 25	SON	CNS; 13	MMR; 12	POR; 21	SGS; 5	TUS; 10	AMP; 9	MAD; 13	POR; 12	LVS; 6	SON; 19	MMR; 9	PHO	9th	1622	
1996	Bill McAnally Racing	2	Chevy	TUS; 15	AMP; 16	MMR; 17		MAD; 11	POR; 17	TUS; 10		CNS; 12	MAD; 15	MMR; 17					9th	1623	
1996	Bill McAnally Racing	02	Chevy				SON; DNQ				EVG; 17				SON; 12	MMR; 9	PHO; DNQ	LVS; 22	9th	1623	
1997	Bill McAnally Racing	16	Chevy	TUS; 7	AMP; 17		TUS; 11	MMR; 10	LVS; 14	CAL; 11	EVG; 12	POR; 6	PPR; 13	AMP; 7	SON; 6	MMR; 13	LVS; 38		7th	1677	
1997	Bill McAnally Racing	16W	Chevy			SON; DNQ													7th	1677	
1998	Bill McAnally Racing	16	Chevy	TUS; 11	LVS; 21	PHO; 9	CAL; 23	HPT	MMR	AMP	POR	CAL	PPR	EVG	SON	MMR	LVS		30th	462	
