= 1996 Miller 500 (Dover) =

12th race of the 1996 NASCAR Winston Cup Series

Race details
- Race 12 of 31 in the 1996 NASCAR Winston Cup Series
- The 1996 Miller 500 program cover, featuring Rusty Wallace. Artwork by NASCAR artist Sam Bass.
- Date: June 2, 1996
- Official name: 28th Annual Miller 500
- Location: Dover, Delaware, Dover International Speedway
- Course: Permanent racing facility
- Course length: 1 miles (1.6 km)
- Distance: 500 laps, 500 mi (804.672 km)
- Average speed: 122.741 miles per hour (197.532 km/h)

Pole position
Driver	Jeff Gordon	Hendrick Motorsports
- Time: 23.258

Most laps led
Driver	Jeff Gordon	Hendrick Motorsports
- Laps: 307

Winner
No. 10	Jeff Gordon	Hendrick Motorsports

Television in the United States
- Network: TNN
- Announcers: Eli Gold, Dick Berggren, Buddy Baker

Radio in the United States
- Radio: MRN

The 1996 Miller 500 was the 12th stock car race of the 1996 NASCAR Winston Cup Series and the 28th iteration of the event. The race was held on Sunday, June 2, 1996, in Dover, Delaware at Dover International Speedway, a 1-mile (1.6 km) permanent oval-shaped racetrack. The race took the scheduled 500 laps to complete. At race's end, Hendrick Motorsports driver Jeff Gordon would manage to dominate the late stages of the race to take his 13th career NASCAR Winston Cup Series victory and his fourth victory of the season. To fill out the top three, Hendrick Motorsports driver Terry Labonte and Richard Childress Racing driver Dale Earnhardt would finish second and third, respectively.

== Background ==
The layout of Dover International Speedway, the venue where the race was held.

Dover International Speedway is an oval race track in Dover, Delaware, United States that has held at least two NASCAR races since it opened in 1969. In addition to NASCAR, the track also hosted USAC and the NTT IndyCar Series. The track features one layout, a 1-mile (1.6 km) concrete oval, with 24° banking in the turns and 9° banking on the straights. The speedway is owned and operated by Dover Motorsports.

The track, nicknamed "The Monster Mile", was built in 1969 by Melvin Joseph of Melvin L. Joseph Construction Company, Inc., with an asphalt surface, but was replaced with concrete in 1995. Six years later in 2001, the track's capacity moved to 135,000 seats, making the track have the largest capacity of sports venue in the mid-Atlantic. In 2002, the name changed to Dover International Speedway from Dover Downs International Speedway after Dover Downs Gaming and Entertainment split, making Dover Motorsports. From 2007 to 2009, the speedway worked on an improvement project called "The Monster Makeover", which expanded facilities at the track and beautified the track. After the 2014 season, the track's capacity was reduced to 95,500 seats.

=== Entry list ===
- (R) denotes rookie driver.

#	Driver	Team	Make
1	Rick Mast	Precision Products Racing	Pontiac
2	Rusty Wallace	Penske Racing South	Ford
3	Dale Earnhardt	Richard Childress Racing	Chevrolet
4	Sterling Marlin	Morgan–McClure Motorsports	Chevrolet
5	Terry Labonte	Hendrick Motorsports	Chevrolet
6	Mark Martin	Roush Racing	Ford
7	Geoff Bodine	Geoff Bodine Racing	Ford
8	Hut Stricklin	Stavola Brothers Racing	Ford
9	Lake Speed	Melling Racing	Ford
10	Ricky Rudd	Rudd Performance Motorsports	Ford
11	Brett Bodine	Brett Bodine Racing	Ford
12	Derrike Cope	Bobby Allison Motorsports	Ford
15	Wally Dallenbach Jr.	Bud Moore Engineering	Ford
16	Ted Musgrave	Roush Racing	Ford
17	Darrell Waltrip	Darrell Waltrip Motorsports	Chevrolet
18	Bobby Labonte	Joe Gibbs Racing	Chevrolet
19	Dick Trickle	TriStar Motorsports	Ford
21	Michael Waltrip	Wood Brothers Racing	Ford
22	Ward Burton	Bill Davis Racing	Pontiac
23	Jimmy Spencer	Haas-Carter Motorsports	Ford
24	Jeff Gordon	Hendrick Motorsports	Chevrolet
25	Ken Schrader	Hendrick Motorsports	Chevrolet
26	Hermie Sadler	Sadler Racing	Chevrolet
28	Ernie Irvan	Robert Yates Racing	Ford
29	Steve Grissom	Diamond Ridge Motorsports	Chevrolet
30	Johnny Benson Jr. (R)	Bahari Racing	Pontiac
33	Robert Pressley	Leo Jackson Motorsports	Chevrolet
37	Jeremy Mayfield	Kranefuss-Haas Racing	Ford
41	Ricky Craven	Larry Hedrick Motorsports	Chevrolet
42	Kyle Petty	Team SABCO	Pontiac
43	Bobby Hamilton	Petty Enterprises	Pontiac
71	Dave Marcis	Marcis Auto Racing	Chevrolet
75	Morgan Shepherd	Butch Mock Motorsports	Ford
77	Bobby Hillin Jr.	Jasper Motorsports	Ford
81	Kenny Wallace	FILMAR Racing	Ford
87	Joe Nemechek	NEMCO Motorsports	Chevrolet
88	Dale Jarrett	Robert Yates Racing	Ford
90	Mike Wallace	Donlavey Racing	Ford
94	Todd Bodine	Bill Elliott Racing	Ford
95	Gary Bradberry	Sadler Brothers Racing	Ford
98	Jeremy Mayfield	Cale Yarborough Motorsports	Ford
99	Jeff Burton	Roush Racing	Ford

== Qualifying ==
Qualifying was split into two rounds. The first round was held on Friday, May 31, at 3:00 pm EST. Each driver would have one lap to set a time. During the first round, the top 25 drivers in the round would be guaranteed a starting spot in the race. If a driver was not able to guarantee a spot in the first round, they had the option to scrub their time from the first round and try and run a faster lap time in a second round qualifying run, held on Saturday, June 1, at 11:30 am EST. As with the first round, each driver would have one lap to set a time. For this specific race, positions 26–38 would be decided on time, and depending on who needed it, a select amount of positions were given to cars who had not otherwise qualified but were high enough in owner's points.

Jeff Gordon, driving for Hendrick Motorsports, would win the pole, setting a time of 23.258 and an average speed of 154.785 miles per hour (249.102 km/h).

No drivers would fail to qualify.

=== Full qualifying results ===
Pos.	#	Driver	Team	Make	Time	Speed
1	24	Jeff Gordon	Hendrick Motorsports	Chevrolet	23.258	154.785
2	19	Dick Trickle	TriStar Motorsports	Ford	23.390	153.912
3	22	Ward Burton	Bill Davis Racing	Pontiac	23.392	153.899
4	5	Terry Labonte	Hendrick Motorsports	Chevrolet	23.428	153.662
5	8	Hut Stricklin	Stavola Brothers Racing	Ford	23.461	153.446
6	88	Dale Jarrett	Robert Yates Racing	Ford	23.497	153.211
7	18	Bobby Labonte	Joe Gibbs Racing	Chevrolet	23.499	153.198
8	2	Rusty Wallace	Penske Racing South	Ford	23.503	153.172
9	81	Kenny Wallace	FILMAR Racing	Ford	23.505	153.159
10	1	Rick Mast	Precision Products Racing	Pontiac	23.514	153.100
11	11	Brett Bodine	Brett Bodine Racing	Ford	23.519	153.068
12	6	Mark Martin	Roush Racing	Ford	23.542	152.918
13	7	Geoff Bodine	Geoff Bodine Racing	Ford	23.550	152.866
14	3	Dale Earnhardt	Richard Childress Racing	Chevrolet	23.554	152.840
15	42	Kyle Petty	Team SABCO	Pontiac	23.560	152.801
16	10	Ricky Rudd	Rudd Performance Motorsports	Ford	23.580	152.672
17	12	Derrike Cope	Bobby Allison Motorsports	Ford	23.594	152.581
18	99	Jeff Burton	Roush Racing	Ford	23.597	152.562
19	4	Sterling Marlin	Morgan–McClure Motorsports	Chevrolet	23.637	152.304
20	16	Ted Musgrave	Roush Racing	Ford	23.670	152.091
21	28	Ernie Irvan	Robert Yates Racing	Ford	23.671	152.085
22	77	Bobby Hillin Jr.	Jasper Motorsports	Ford	23.671	152.085
23	30	Johnny Benson Jr. (R)	Bahari Racing	Pontiac	23.686	151.989
24	23	Jimmy Spencer	Travis Carter Enterprises	Ford	23.690	151.963
25	37	John Andretti	Kranefuss-Haas Racing	Ford	23.699	151.905
Failed to lock in Round 1
26	95	Gary Bradberry	Sadler Brothers Racing	Ford	23.637	152.304
27	21	Michael Waltrip	Wood Brothers Racing	Ford	23.681	152.021
28	90	Mike Wallace	Donlavey Racing	Ford	23.685	151.995
29	41	Ricky Craven	Larry Hedrick Motorsports	Chevrolet	23.712	151.822
30	26	Hermie Sadler	Sadler Racing	Chevrolet	23.713	151/815
31	25	Ken Schrader	Hendrick Motorsports	Chevrolet	23.726	151.732
32	9	Lake Speed	Melling Racing	Ford	23.737	151.662
33	94	Todd Bodine	Bill Elliott Racing	Ford	23.740	151.815
34	15	Wally Dallenbach Jr.	Bud Moore Engineering	Ford	23.757	151.534
35	29	Steve Grissom	Diamond Ridge Motorsports	Chevrolet	23.772	151.439
36	87	Joe Nemechek	NEMCO Motorsports	Chevrolet	23.774	151.426
37	75	Morgan Shepherd	Butch Mock Motorsports	Ford	23.777	151.407
38	43	Bobby Hamilton	Petty Enterprises	Pontiac	23.779	151.394
Provisionals
39	98	Jeremy Mayfield	Cale Yarborough Motorsports	Ford	-*	-*
40	33	Greg Sacks	Leo Jackson Motorsports	Chevrolet	-*	-*
41	17	Darrell Waltrip	Darrell Waltrip Motorsports	Chevrolet	-*	-*
42	71	Dave Marcis	Marcis Auto Racing	Chevrolet	-*	-*
Official first round qualifying results
Official starting lineup

== Race results ==
Fin	St	#	Driver	Team	Make	Laps	Led	Status	Pts	Winnings
1	1	24	Jeff Gordon	Hendrick Motorsports	Chevrolet	500	307	running	185	$138,730
2	4	5	Terry Labonte	Hendrick Motorsports	Chevrolet	500	0	running	170	$57,480
3	14	3	Dale Earnhardt	Richard Childress Racing	Chevrolet	500	90	running	170	$60,080
4	21	28	Ernie Irvan	Robert Yates Racing	Ford	500	16	running	165	$42,440
5	7	18	Bobby Labonte	Joe Gibbs Racing	Chevrolet	499	0	running	155	$42,295
6	24	23	Jimmy Spencer	Travis Carter Enterprises	Ford	499	0	running	150	$37,215
7	8	2	Rusty Wallace	Penske Racing South	Ford	499	0	running	146	$22,265
8	16	10	Ricky Rudd	Rudd Performance Motorsports	Ford	499	0	running	142	$32,765
9	18	99	Jeff Burton	Roush Racing	Ford	499	0	running	138	$22,115
10	31	25	Ken Schrader	Hendrick Motorsports	Chevrolet	499	0	running	134	$32,465
11	27	21	Michael Waltrip	Wood Brothers Racing	Ford	498	0	running	130	$27,365
12	39	98	Jeremy Mayfield	Cale Yarborough Motorsports	Ford	497	0	running	127	$19,765
13	20	16	Ted Musgrave	Roush Racing	Ford	497	0	running	124	$26,365
14	29	41	Ricky Craven	Larry Hedrick Motorsports	Chevrolet	497	1	running	126	$25,965
15	33	94	Todd Bodine	Bill Elliott Racing	Ford	496	0	running	118	$25,765
16	3	22	Ward Burton	Bill Davis Racing	Pontiac	496	0	running	115	$29,490
17	23	30	Johnny Benson Jr. (R)	Bahari Racing	Pontiac	496	0	running	112	$26,065
18	15	42	Kyle Petty	Team SABCO	Pontiac	496	0	running	109	$24,850
19	28	90	Mike Wallace	Donlavey Racing	Ford	495	0	running	106	$17,665
20	9	81	Kenny Wallace	FILMAR Racing	Ford	495	0	running	103	$19,315
21	38	43	Bobby Hamilton	Petty Enterprises	Pontiac	495	0	running	100	$24,365
22	34	15	Wally Dallenbach Jr.	Bud Moore Engineering	Ford	493	0	running	97	$24,215
23	17	12	Derrike Cope	Bobby Allison Motorsports	Ford	492	0	running	94	$24,065
24	11	11	Brett Bodine	Brett Bodine Racing	Ford	490	0	running	91	$23,915
25	36	87	Joe Nemechek	NEMCO Motorsports	Chevrolet	488	0	running	88	$23,940
26	32	9	Lake Speed	Melling Racing	Ford	481	0	running	85	$23,690
27	40	33	Greg Sacks	Leo Jackson Motorsports	Chevrolet	480	0	running	82	$24,140
28	2	19	Dick Trickle	TriStar Motorsports	Ford	471	0	running	79	$13,990
29	22	77	Bobby Hillin Jr.	Jasper Motorsports	Ford	467	0	running	76	$13,540
30	13	7	Geoff Bodine	Geoff Bodine Racing	Ford	467	0	running	73	$20,490
31	42	71	Dave Marcis	Marcis Auto Racing	Chevrolet	452	0	running	70	$13,450
32	37	75	Morgan Shepherd	Butch Mock Motorsports	Ford	434	0	running	67	$13,380
33	25	37	John Andretti	Kranefuss-Haas Racing	Ford	429	3	engine	69	$20,330
34	5	8	Hut Stricklin	Stavola Brothers Racing	Ford	421	0	engine	61	$13,280
35	10	1	Rick Mast	Precision Products Racing	Pontiac	405	0	crash	58	$20,080
36	6	88	Dale Jarrett	Robert Yates Racing	Ford	374	83	crash	60	$22,055
37	30	26	Hermie Sadler	Sadler Racing	Chevrolet	349	0	handling	52	$13,055
38	26	95	Gary Bradberry	Sadler Brothers Racing	Ford	345	0	engine	49	$13,055
39	41	17	Darrell Waltrip	Darrell Waltrip Motorsports	Chevrolet	229	0	handling	46	$20,055
40	12	6	Mark Martin	Roush Racing	Ford	219	0	engine	43	$29,855
41	19	4	Sterling Marlin	Morgan–McClure Motorsports	Chevrolet	87	0	engine	40	$29,655
42	35	29	Steve Grissom	Diamond Ridge Motorsports	Chevrolet	64	0	crash	37	$20,055
Official race results

Previous race: 1996 Coca-Cola 600	NASCAR Winston Cup Series; 1996 season	Next race: 1996 UAW-GM Teamwork 500
