= 1996 Miller 400 (Michigan) =

14th race of the 1996 NASCAR Winston Cup Series

Race details
- Race 14 of 31 in the 1996 NASCAR Winston Cup Series
- The 1996 Miller 400 program cover, featuring Rusty Wallace. Artwork by NASCAR artist Sam Bass.
- Date: June 23, 1996
- Official name: 28th Annual Miller 400
- Location: Cambridge Township, Michigan, Michigan International Speedway
- Course: Permanent racing facility
- Course length: 2 miles (3.2 km)
- Distance: 200 laps, 400 mi (643.737 km)
- Average speed: 166.033 miles per hour (267.204 km/h)

Pole position
Driver	Bobby Hamilton	Petty Enterprises
- Time: 38.884

Most laps led
Driver	Sterling Marlin	Morgan-McClure Motorsports
- Laps: 78

Winner
No. 2	Rusty Wallace	Penske Racing South

Television in the United States
- Network: CBS
- Announcers: Ken Squier, Ned Jarrett, Buddy Baker

Radio in the United States
- Radio: Motor Racing Network

The 1996 Miller 400 was the 14th stock car race of the 1996 NASCAR Winston Cup Series and the 28th iteration of the event. The race was held on Sunday, June 23, 1996, in Cambridge Township, Michigan, at Michigan International Speedway, a two-mile (3.2 km) moderate-banked D-shaped speedway. The race took the scheduled 200 laps to complete. Depending on fuel mileage, Penske Racing South driver Rusty Wallace would manage to drive a conservative race for the last 52 laps of the race to take his 44th career NASCAR Winston Cup Series victory and his third victory of the season. To fill out the top three, Hendrick Motorsports driver Terry Labonte and Morgan–McClure Motorsports driver Sterling Marlin would finish second and third, respectively.

== Background ==
The layout of Michigan International Speedway, the venue where the race was held.

The race was held at Michigan International Speedway, a two-mile (3.2 km) moderate-banked D-shaped speedway located in Cambridge Township, Michigan. The track is used primarily for NASCAR events. The track is owned by International Speedway Corporation. MIS is recognized as one of motorsports' premier facilities because of its wide racing surface and high banking (by open-wheel standards; the 18-degree banking is modest by stock car standards).

=== Entry list ===
- (R) denotes rookie driver.

#	Driver	Team	Make
1	Rick Mast	Precision Products Racing	Pontiac
2	Rusty Wallace	Penske Racing South	Ford
3	Dale Earnhardt	Richard Childress Racing	Chevrolet
4	Sterling Marlin	Morgan–McClure Motorsports	Chevrolet
5	Terry Labonte	Hendrick Motorsports	Chevrolet
6	Mark Martin	Roush Racing	Ford
7	Geoff Bodine	Geoff Bodine Racing	Ford
8	Hut Stricklin	Stavola Brothers Racing	Ford
9	Lake Speed	Melling Racing	Ford
10	Ricky Rudd	Rudd Performance Motorsports	Ford
11	Brett Bodine	Brett Bodine Racing	Ford
12	Derrike Cope	Bobby Allison Motorsports	Ford
15	Wally Dallenbach Jr.	Bud Moore Engineering	Ford
16	Ted Musgrave	Roush Racing	Ford
17	Darrell Waltrip	Darrell Waltrip Motorsports	Chevrolet
18	Bobby Labonte	Joe Gibbs Racing	Chevrolet
19	Loy Allen Jr.	TriStar Motorsports	Ford
21	Michael Waltrip	Wood Brothers Racing	Ford
22	Ward Burton	Bill Davis Racing	Pontiac
23	Jimmy Spencer	Haas-Carter Motorsports	Ford
24	Jeff Gordon	Hendrick Motorsports	Chevrolet
25	Ken Schrader	Hendrick Motorsports	Chevrolet
28	Ernie Irvan	Robert Yates Racing	Ford
29	Steve Grissom	Diamond Ridge Motorsports	Chevrolet
30	Johnny Benson Jr. (R)	Bahari Racing	Pontiac
33	Robert Pressley	Leo Jackson Motorsports	Chevrolet
37	Jeremy Mayfield	Kranefuss-Haas Racing	Ford
41	Ricky Craven	Larry Hedrick Motorsports	Chevrolet
42	Kyle Petty	Team SABCO	Pontiac
43	Bobby Hamilton	Petty Enterprises	Pontiac
71	Dave Marcis	Marcis Auto Racing	Chevrolet
75	Morgan Shepherd	Butch Mock Motorsports	Ford
77	Bobby Hillin Jr.	Jasper Motorsports	Ford
81	Kenny Wallace	FILMAR Racing	Ford
87	Joe Nemechek	NEMCO Motorsports	Chevrolet
88	Dale Jarrett	Robert Yates Racing	Ford
90	Dick Trickle	Donlavey Racing	Ford
94	Todd Bodine	Bill Elliott Racing	Ford
98	Jeremy Mayfield	Cale Yarborough Motorsports	Ford
99	Jeff Burton	Roush Racing	Ford

== Qualifying ==
Qualifying was split into two rounds. The first round was held on Friday, June 21, at 3:30 PM EST. Each driver would have one lap to set a time. During the first round, the top 25 drivers in the round would be guaranteed a starting spot in the race. If a driver was not able to guarantee a spot in the first round, they had the option to scrub their time from the first round and try and run a faster lap time in a second round qualifying run, held on Saturday, June 22, at 10:30 AM EST. As with the first round, each driver would have one lap to set a time. For this specific race, positions 26-38 would be decided on time, and depending on who needed it, a select amount of positions were given to cars who had not otherwise qualified but were high enough in owner's points.

Bobby Hamilton, driving for Petty Enterprises, would win the pole, setting a time of 38.884 and an average speed of 185.166 miles per hour (297.996 km/h).

No drivers would fail to qualify.

=== Full qualifying results ===
Pos.	#	Driver	Team	Make	Time	Speed
1	43	Bobby Hamilton	Petty Enterprises	Pontiac	38.884	185.166
2	12	Derrike Cope	Bobby Allison Motorsports	Ford	39.098	184.153
3	75	Morgan Shepherd	Butch Mock Motorsports	Ford	39.213	183.613
4	6	Mark Martin	Roush Racing	Ford	39.214	183.608
5	18	Bobby Labonte	Joe Gibbs Racing	Chevrolet	39.220	183.580
6	5	Terry Labonte	Hendrick Motorsports	Chevrolet	39.260	183.393
7	24	Jeff Gordon	Hendrick Motorsports	Chevrolet	39.263	183.379
8	4	Sterling Marlin	Morgan–McClure Motorsports	Chevrolet	39.278	183.309
9	9	Lake Speed	Melling Racing	Ford	39.279	183.304
10	11	Brett Bodine	Brett Bodine Racing	Ford	39.338	183.029
11	3	Dale Earnhardt	Richard Childress Racing	Chevrolet	39.345	182.997
12	16	Ted Musgrave	Roush Racing	Ford	39.360	182.927
13	98	Jeremy Mayfield	Cale Yarborough Motorsports	Ford	39.382	182.825
14	10	Ricky Rudd	Rudd Performance Motorsports	Ford	39.391	182.783
15	41	Ricky Craven	Larry Hedrick Motorsports	Chevrolet	39.410	182.695
16	81	Kenny Wallace	FILMAR Racing	Ford	39.440	182.556
17	1	Rick Mast	Precision Products Racing	Pontiac	39.473	182.403
18	2	Rusty Wallace	Penske Racing South	Ford	39.477	182.385
19	90	Dick Trickle	Donlavey Racing	Ford	39.482	182.362
20	21	Michael Waltrip	Wood Brothers Racing	Ford	39.487	182.338
21	7	Geoff Bodine	Geoff Bodine Racing	Ford	39.508	182.242
22	29	Steve Grissom	Diamond Ridge Motorsports	Chevrolet	39.520	182.186
23	37	John Andretti	Kranefuss-Haas Racing	Ford	39.547	182.062
24	87	Joe Nemechek	NEMCO Motorsports	Chevrolet	39.577	181.924
25	99	Jeff Burton	Roush Racing	Ford	39.592	181.855
Failed to lock in Round 1
26	17	Darrell Waltrip	Darrell Waltrip Motorsports	Chevrolet	39.649	181.593
27	25	Ken Schrader	Hendrick Motorsports	Chevrolet	39.680	181.452
28	77	Bobby Hillin Jr.	Jasper Motorsports	Ford	39.732	181.214
29	42	Kyle Petty	Team SABCO	Pontiac	39.735	181.200
30	88	Dale Jarrett	Robert Yates Racing	Ford	39.762	181.077
31	15	Wally Dallenbach Jr.	Bud Moore Engineering	Ford	39.770	181.041
32	28	Ernie Irvan	Robert Yates Racing	Ford	39.790	180.950
33	8	Hut Stricklin	Stavola Brothers Racing	Ford	39.852	180.668
34	22	Ward Burton	Bill Davis Racing	Pontiac	39.885	180.519
35	33	Robert Pressley	Leo Jackson Motorsports	Chevrolet	39.917	180.374
36	71	Dave Marcis	Marcis Auto Racing	Chevrolet	40.053	179.762
37	30	Johnny Benson Jr. (R)	Bahari Racing	Pontiac	40.103	179.538
38	19	Loy Allen Jr.	TriStar Motorsports	Ford	40.225	178.993
Provisionals
39	94	Todd Bodine	Bill Elliott Racing	Ford	-*	-*
40	23	Jimmy Spencer	Travis Carter Enterprises	Ford	-*	-*
Official first round qualifying results
Official starting lineup

*Time not available.

== Race results ==
Fin	St	#	Driver	Team	Make	Laps	Led	Status	Pts	Winnings
1	18	2	Rusty Wallace	Penske Racing South	Ford	200	10	running	180	$71,380
2	6	5	Terry Labonte	Hendrick Motorsports	Chevrolet	200	6	running	175	$59,730
3	8	4	Sterling Marlin	Morgan–McClure Motorsports	Chevrolet	200	78	running	175	$55,930
4	40	23	Jimmy Spencer	Travis Carter Enterprises	Ford	200	0	running	160	$43,775
5	32	28	Ernie Irvan	Robert Yates Racing	Ford	200	0	running	155	$40,525
6	7	24	Jeff Gordon	Hendrick Motorsports	Chevrolet	200	42	running	155	$41,650
7	4	6	Mark Martin	Roush Racing	Ford	200	0	running	146	$35,350
8	12	16	Ted Musgrave	Roush Racing	Ford	200	0	running	142	$29,200
9	11	3	Dale Earnhardt	Richard Childress Racing	Chevrolet	200	0	running	138	$33,350
10	30	88	Dale Jarrett	Robert Yates Racing	Ford	200	3	running	139	$27,850
11	3	75	Morgan Shepherd	Butch Mock Motorsports	Ford	200	44	running	135	$19,900
12	5	18	Bobby Labonte	Joe Gibbs Racing	Chevrolet	200	7	running	132	$30,425
13	31	15	Wally Dallenbach Jr.	Bud Moore Engineering	Ford	199	0	running	124	$25,375
14	28	77	Bobby Hillin Jr.	Jasper Motorsports	Ford	199	0	running	121	$13,525
15	1	43	Bobby Hamilton	Petty Enterprises	Pontiac	199	5	running	123	$26,025
16	27	25	Ken Schrader	Hendrick Motorsports	Chevrolet	199	0	running	115	$23,950
17	25	99	Jeff Burton	Roush Racing	Ford	199	0	running	112	$16,625
18	17	1	Rick Mast	Precision Products Racing	Pontiac	199	0	running	109	$23,290
19	9	9	Lake Speed	Melling Racing	Ford	199	0	running	106	$22,875
20	39	94	Todd Bodine	Bill Elliott Racing	Ford	199	0	running	103	$24,360
21	21	7	Geoff Bodine	Geoff Bodine Racing	Ford	199	0	running	100	$22,240
22	10	11	Brett Bodine	Brett Bodine Racing	Ford	199	0	running	97	$22,025
23	35	33	Robert Pressley	Leo Jackson Motorsports	Chevrolet	199	0	running	94	$21,790
24	23	37	John Andretti	Kranefuss-Haas Racing	Ford	198	0	running	91	$21,580
25	26	17	Darrell Waltrip	Darrell Waltrip Motorsports	Chevrolet	198	0	running	88	$21,545
26	36	71	Dave Marcis	Marcis Auto Racing	Chevrolet	198	0	running	85	$14,085
27	33	8	Hut Stricklin	Stavola Brothers Racing	Ford	197	0	running	82	$13,925
28	38	19	Loy Allen Jr.	TriStar Motorsports	Ford	197	0	running	79	$13,865
29	15	41	Ricky Craven	Larry Hedrick Motorsports	Chevrolet	197	0	running	76	$20,255
30	13	98	Jeremy Mayfield	Cale Yarborough Motorsports	Ford	196	0	out of gas	73	$17,690
31	14	10	Ricky Rudd	Rudd Performance Motorsports	Ford	195	5	running	75	$35,540
32	20	21	Michael Waltrip	Wood Brothers Racing	Ford	192	0	running	67	$17,490
33	16	81	Kenny Wallace	FILMAR Racing	Ford	192	0	running	64	$10,385
34	22	29	Steve Grissom	Diamond Ridge Motorsports	Chevrolet	166	0	engine	61	$10,315
35	34	22	Ward Burton	Bill Davis Racing	Pontiac	156	0	engine	58	$25,245
36	24	87	Joe Nemechek	NEMCO Motorsports	Chevrolet	137	0	engine	55	$17,165
37	37	30	Johnny Benson Jr. (R)	Bahari Racing	Pontiac	130	0	engine	52	$16,165
38	29	42	Kyle Petty	Team SABCO	Pontiac	125	0	engine	49	$17,080
39	19	90	Dick Trickle	Donlavey Racing	Ford	119	0	engine	46	$10,080
40	2	12	Derrike Cope	Bobby Allison Motorsports	Ford	53	0	piston	43	$24,080
Official race results

== Media ==
=== Television ===
The Daytona 500 was covered by CBS with Ken Squier, two-time NASCAR Cup Series champion Ned Jarrett and 1979 race winner Buddy Baker in commentary. Mike Joy, David Hobbs and Dick Berggren handled pit road for the television side.

CBS
Booth announcers		Pit reporters
Lap-by-lap	Color-commentators	Pit reporters
Ken Squier	Ned Jarrett; Buddy Baker	Mike Joy; David Hobbs; Dick Berggren

Previous race: 1996 UAW-GM Teamwork 500	NASCAR Winston Cup Series; 1996 season	Next race: 1996 Pepsi 400
