= 1996 Coca-Cola 600 =

11th race of the 1996 NASCAR Winston Cup Series

Race details
- Race 11 of 31 in the 1996 NASCAR Winston Cup Series
- The 1996 Coca-Cola 600 program cover, with artwork by NASCAR artist Sam Bass.
- Date: May 26, 1996
- Official name: 37th Annual Coca-Cola 600
- Location: Concord, North Carolina, Charlotte Motor Speedway
- Course: Permanent racing facility
- Course length: 1.5 miles (2.41 km)
- Distance: 400 laps, 600 mi (965.606 km)
- Average speed: 147.581 miles per hour (237.509 km/h)
- Attendance: 165,000

Pole position
Driver	Jeff Gordon	Hendrick Motorsports
- Time: 29.384

Most laps led
Driver	Dale Jarrett	Robert Yates Racing
- Laps: 199

Winner
No. 88	Dale Jarrett	Robert Yates Racing

Television in the United States
- Network: TBS
- Announcers: Ken Squier, Buddy Baker, Dick Berggren

Radio in the United States
- Radio: Performance Racing Network

The 1996 Coca-Cola 600 was the 11th stock car race of the 1996 NASCAR Winston Cup Series and the 37th iteration of the event. The race was held on Sunday, May 26, 1996, in Concord, North Carolina, at Charlotte Motor Speedway, a 1.5 miles (2.4 km) permanent quad-oval. The race took the scheduled 400 laps to complete. At race's end, Robert Yates Racing driver Dale Jarrett would manage to dominate the late stages of the race to take his sixth career NASCAR Winston Cup Series victory and his second victory of the season. To fill out the top three, Richard Childress Racing driver Dale Earnhardt and Hendrick Motorsports driver Terry Labonte would finish second and third, respectively.

== Background ==
The layout of Charlotte Motor Speedway, the venue where the race was held.

Charlotte Motor Speedway is a motorsports complex located in Concord, North Carolina, United States 13 miles from Charlotte, North Carolina. The complex features a 1.5 miles (2.4 km) quad oval track that hosts NASCAR racing including the prestigious Coca-Cola 600 on Memorial Day weekend and the NEXTEL All-Star Challenge, as well as the UAW-GM Quality 500. The speedway was built in 1959 by Bruton Smith and is considered the home track for NASCAR with many race teams located in the Charlotte area. The track is owned and operated by Speedway Motorsports Inc. (SMI) with Marcus G. Smith (son of Bruton Smith) as track president.

=== Entry list ===
- (R) denotes rookie driver.

#	Driver	Team	Make
0	Delma Cowart	H. L. Waters Racing	Ford
1	Rick Mast	Precision Products Racing	Pontiac
2	Rusty Wallace	Penske Racing South	Ford
02	Robbie Faggart	Miles Motorsports	Chevrolet
3	Dale Earnhardt	Richard Childress Racing	Chevrolet
4	Sterling Marlin	Morgan–McClure Motorsports	Chevrolet
5	Terry Labonte	Hendrick Motorsports	Chevrolet
6	Mark Martin	Roush Racing	Ford
7	Geoff Bodine	Geoff Bodine Racing	Ford
8	Hut Stricklin	Stavola Brothers Racing	Ford
9	Lake Speed	Melling Racing	Ford
10	Ricky Rudd	Rudd Performance Motorsports	Ford
11	Brett Bodine	Brett Bodine Racing	Ford
12	Derrike Cope	Bobby Allison Motorsports	Ford
15	Wally Dallenbach Jr.	Bud Moore Engineering	Ford
16	Ted Musgrave	Roush Racing	Ford
17	Darrell Waltrip	Darrell Waltrip Motorsports	Chevrolet
18	Bobby Labonte	Joe Gibbs Racing	Chevrolet
19	Dick Trickle	TriStar Motorsports	Ford
21	Michael Waltrip	Wood Brothers Racing	Ford
22	Ward Burton	Bill Davis Racing	Pontiac
23	Jimmy Spencer	Travis Carter Enterprises	Ford
24	Jeff Gordon	Hendrick Motorsports	Chevrolet
25	Ken Schrader	Hendrick Motorsports	Chevrolet
26	Hermie Sadler	Sadler Racing	Chevrolet
27	Elton Sawyer	David Blair Motorsports	Ford
28	Ernie Irvan	Robert Yates Racing	Ford
29	Steve Grissom	Diamond Ridge Motorsports	Chevrolet
30	Johnny Benson Jr. (R)	Bahari Racing	Pontiac
33	Robert Pressley	Leo Jackson Motorsports	Chevrolet
37	Jeremy Mayfield	Kranefuss-Haas Racing	Ford
41	Ricky Craven	Larry Hedrick Motorsports	Chevrolet
42	Kyle Petty	Team SABCO	Pontiac
43	Bobby Hamilton	Petty Enterprises	Pontiac
49	Mark Gibson	Campbell Racing	Ford
57	Steve Seligman	Seligman Racing	Ford
63	Ed Berrier	Schnell Motorsports	Ford
71	Dave Marcis	Marcis Auto Racing	Chevrolet
75	Morgan Shepherd	Butch Mock Motorsports	Ford
77	Bobby Hillin Jr.	Jasper Motorsports	Ford
78	Randy MacDonald	Triad Motorsports	Ford
81	Kenny Wallace	FILMAR Racing	Ford
87	Joe Nemechek	NEMCO Motorsports	Chevrolet
88	Dale Jarrett	Robert Yates Racing	Ford
90	Dick Trickle	Donlavey Racing	Ford
94	Todd Bodine	Elliott-Hardy Racing	Ford
95	Chuck Bown	Sadler Brothers Racing	Ford
97	Chad Little	Mark Rypien Motorsports	Pontiac
98	Jeremy Mayfield	Cale Yarborough Motorsports	Ford
99	Jeff Burton	Roush Racing	Ford

== Qualifying ==
Qualifying was split into two rounds. The first round was held on Wednesday, May 22, at 7:00 PM EST. Each driver would have one lap to set a time. During the first round, the top 25 drivers in the round would be guaranteed a starting spot in the race. If a driver was not able to guarantee a spot in the first round, they had the option to scrub their time from the first round and try and run a faster lap time in a second round qualifying run, held on Thursday, May 23, at 6:00 PM EST. As with the first round, each driver would have one lap to set a time. For this specific race, positions 26-38 would be decided on time, and depending on who needed it, a select amount of positions were given to cars who had not otherwise qualified but were high enough in owner's points; up to four provisionals were given. If needed, a past champion who did not qualify on either time or provisionals could use a champion's provisional, adding one more spot to the field.

Jeff Gordon, driving for Hendrick Motorsports, would win the pole, setting a time of 29.384 and an average speed of 183.773 miles per hour (295.754 km/h) in the first round.

Seven drivers would fail to qualify.

=== Full qualifying results ===
Pos.	#	Driver	Team	Make	Time	Speed
1	24	Jeff Gordon	Hendrick Motorsports	Chevrolet	29.384	183.773
2	41	Ricky Craven	Larry Hedrick Motorsports	Chevrolet	29.528	182.877
3	37	John Andretti	Kranefuss-Haas Racing	Ford	29.529	182.871
4	5	Terry Labonte	Hendrick Motorsports	Chevrolet	29.594	182.469
5	18	Bobby Labonte	Joe Gibbs Racing	Chevrolet	29.606	182.395
6	97	Chad Little	Mark Rypien Motorsports	Pontiac	29.659	182.070
7	6	Mark Martin	Roush Racing	Ford	29.675	181.971
8	21	Michael Waltrip	Wood Brothers Racing	Ford	29.675	181.971
9	19	Dick Trickle	TriStar Motorsports	Ford	29.688	181.892
10	9	Lake Speed	Melling Racing	Ford	29.700	181.818
11	30	Johnny Benson Jr. (R)	Bahari Racing	Pontiac	29.736	181.598
12	94	Todd Bodine	Elliott-Hardy Racing	Ford	29.741	181.568
13	99	Jeff Burton	Roush Racing	Ford	29.754	181.488
14	12	Derrike Cope	Bobby Allison Motorsports	Ford	29.762	181.439
15	88	Dale Jarrett	Robert Yates Racing	Ford	29.774	181.366
16	81	Kenny Wallace	FILMAR Racing	Ford	29.786	181.293
17	77	Bobby Hillin Jr.	Jasper Motorsports	Ford	29.786	181.293
18	23	Jimmy Spencer	Travis Carter Enterprises	Ford	29.811	181.141
19	15	Wally Dallenbach Jr.	Bud Moore Engineering	Ford	29.827	181.044
20	3	Dale Earnhardt	Richard Childress Racing	Chevrolet	29.830	181.026
21	29	Steve Grissom	Diamond Ridge Motorsports	Chevrolet	29.836	180.989
22	28	Ernie Irvan	Robert Yates Racing	Ford	29.850	180.905
23	25	Ken Schrader	Hendrick Motorsports	Chevrolet	29.853	180.886
24	98	Jeremy Mayfield	Cale Yarborough Motorsports	Ford	29.872	180.771
25	8	Hut Stricklin	Stavola Brothers Racing	Ford	29.876	180.747
Failed to lock in Round 1
26	1	Rick Mast	Precision Products Racing	Pontiac	29.897	180.620
27	90	Mike Wallace	Donlavey Racing	Ford	29.948	180.313
28	17	Darrell Waltrip	Darrell Waltrip Motorsports	Chevrolet	29.949	180.307
29	33	Robert Pressley	Leo Jackson Motorsports	Chevrolet	29.995	180.030
30	10	Ricky Rudd	Rudd Performance Motorsports	Ford	30.005	179.970
31	7	Geoff Bodine	Geoff Bodine Racing	Ford	30.037	179.778
32	42	Kyle Petty	Team SABCO	Pontiac	30.045	179.730
33	87	Joe Nemechek	NEMCO Motorsports	Chevrolet	30.059	179.647
34	95	Chuck Bown	Sadler Brothers Racing	Ford	30.059	179.647
35	22	Ward Burton	Bill Davis Racing	Pontiac	30.081	179.515
36	4	Sterling Marlin	Morgan–McClure Motorsports	Chevrolet	30.132	179.211
37	43	Bobby Hamilton	Petty Enterprises	Pontiac	30.137	179.182
38	75	Morgan Shepherd	Butch Mock Motorsports	Ford	30.157	179.063
Provisionals
39	16	Ted Musgrave	Roush Racing	Ford	-*	-*
40	11	Brett Bodine	Brett Bodine Racing	Ford	-*	-*
41	71	Dave Marcis	Marcis Auto Racing	Chevrolet	-*	-*
42	27	Elton Sawyer	David Blair Motorsports	Ford	-*	-*
Champion's Provisional
43	2	Rusty Wallace	Penske Racing South	Ford	-*	-*
Failed to qualify
44	78	Randy MacDonald	Triad Motorsports	Ford	-*	-*
45	63	Ed Berrier	Schnell Motorsports	Ford	-*	-*
46	26	Hermie Sadler	Sadler Racing	Chevrolet	-*	-*
47	49	Mark Gibson	Campbell Racing	Ford	-*	-*
48	02	Robbie Faggart	Miles Motorsports	Chevrolet	-*	-*
49	0	Delma Cowart	H. L. Waters Racing	Ford	-*	-*
50	57	Steve Seligman	Seligman Racing	Ford	-*	-*
Official first round qualifying results
Official starting lineup

== Race results ==
Fin	St	#	Driver	Team	Make	Laps	Led	Status	Pts	Winnings
1	15	88	Dale Jarrett	Robert Yates Racing	Ford	400	199	running	185	$165,250
2	20	3	Dale Earnhardt	Richard Childress Racing	Chevrolet	400	7	running	175	$97,000
3	4	5	Terry Labonte	Hendrick Motorsports	Chevrolet	400	59	running	170	$75,300
4	1	24	Jeff Gordon	Hendrick Motorsports	Chevrolet	400	101	running	165	$118,200
5	23	25	Ken Schrader	Hendrick Motorsports	Chevrolet	399	0	running	155	$46,350
6	36	4	Sterling Marlin	Morgan–McClure Motorsports	Chevrolet	399	9	running	155	$55,100
7	7	6	Mark Martin	Roush Racing	Ford	399	0	running	146	$43,400
8	8	21	Michael Waltrip	Wood Brothers Racing	Ford	399	0	running	142	$36,500
9	22	28	Ernie Irvan	Robert Yates Racing	Ford	398	0	running	138	$37,000
10	31	7	Geoff Bodine	Geoff Bodine Racing	Ford	398	0	running	134	$36,500
11	35	22	Ward Burton	Bill Davis Racing	Pontiac	397	0	running	130	$34,150
12	26	1	Rick Mast	Precision Products Racing	Pontiac	397	0	running	127	$29,150
13	28	17	Darrell Waltrip	Darrell Waltrip Motorsports	Chevrolet	397	0	running	124	$27,700
14	14	12	Derrike Cope	Bobby Allison Motorsports	Ford	397	0	running	121	$26,450
15	30	10	Ricky Rudd	Rudd Performance Motorsports	Ford	396	0	running	118	$30,620
16	21	29	Steve Grissom	Diamond Ridge Motorsports	Chevrolet	395	0	running	115	$24,200
17	18	23	Jimmy Spencer	Travis Carter Enterprises	Ford	395	0	running	112	$23,350
18	13	99	Jeff Burton	Roush Racing	Ford	395	0	running	109	$15,490
19	19	15	Wally Dallenbach Jr.	Bud Moore Engineering	Ford	393	0	running	106	$21,800
20	9	19	Dick Trickle	TriStar Motorsports	Ford	392	0	running	103	$16,325
21	42	27	Elton Sawyer	David Blair Motorsports	Ford	392	0	running	100	$13,490
22	5	18	Bobby Labonte	Joe Gibbs Racing	Chevrolet	391	13	running	102	$26,945
23	32	42	Kyle Petty	Team SABCO	Pontiac	391	0	running	94	$19,485
24	40	11	Brett Bodine	Brett Bodine Racing	Ford	389	0	running	91	$19,220
25	33	87	Joe Nemechek	NEMCO Motorsports	Chevrolet	386	0	running	88	$19,210
26	17	77	Bobby Hillin Jr.	Jasper Motorsports	Ford	369	0	running	85	$8,680
27	3	37	John Andretti	Kranefuss-Haas Racing	Ford	368	0	running	82	$22,170
28	25	8	Hut Stricklin	Stavola Brothers Racing	Ford	364	0	running	79	$11,510
29	38	75	Morgan Shepherd	Butch Mock Motorsports	Ford	364	0	running	76	$11,480
30	39	16	Ted Musgrave	Roush Racing	Ford	352	0	running	73	$18,465
31	37	43	Bobby Hamilton	Petty Enterprises	Pontiac	342	0	running	70	$15,455
32	16	81	Kenny Wallace	FILMAR Racing	Ford	332	0	engine	67	$8,445
33	29	33	Robert Pressley	Leo Jackson Motorsports	Chevrolet	310	0	running	64	$15,435
34	43	2	Rusty Wallace	Penske Racing South	Ford	300	0	running	61	$23,425
35	10	9	Lake Speed	Melling Racing	Ford	213	0	handling	58	$15,720
36	12	94	Todd Bodine	Elliott-Hardy Racing	Ford	209	0	accident	55	$15,415
37	2	41	Ricky Craven	Larry Hedrick Motorsports	Chevrolet	193	9	accident	57	$21,415
38	11	30	Johnny Benson Jr. (R)	Bahari Racing	Pontiac	192	0	accident	49	$16,400
39	27	90	Mike Wallace	Donlavey Racing	Ford	189	0	oil pump	46	$8,400
40	41	71	Dave Marcis	Marcis Auto Racing	Chevrolet	138	3	accident	48	$9,300
41	24	98	Jeremy Mayfield	Cale Yarborough Motorsports	Ford	136	0	transmission	40	$8,400
42	34	95	Chuck Bown	Sadler Brothers Racing	Ford	68	0	handling	37	$8,400
43	6	97	Chad Little	Mark Rypien Motorsports	Pontiac	0	0	oil pump	34	$8,400
Official race results

Previous race: 1996 Save Mart Supermarkets 300	NASCAR Winston Cup Series; 1996 season	Next race: 1996 Miller 500 (Dover)
