= 1996 Miller 500 (Pocono) =

17th race of the 1996 NASCAR Winston Cup Series

Race details
- Race 17 of 31 in the 1996 NASCAR Winston Cup Series
- The 1996 Miller 500 program cover, featuring Rusty Wallace. Artwork by NASCAR artist Sam Bass.
- Date: July 21, 1996
- Official name: 24th Annual Miller 500
- Location: Long Pond, Pennsylvania, Pocono Raceway
- Course: Permanent racing facility
- Course length: 2.5 miles (4.0 km)
- Distance: 200 laps, 500 mi (804.672 km)
- Average speed: 144.892 miles per hour (233.181 km/h)

Pole position
Driver	Mark Martin	Roush Racing
- Time: 53.441

Most laps led
Driver	Mark Martin	Roush Racing
- Laps: 121

Winner
No. 2	Rusty Wallace	Penske Racing South

Television in the United States
- Network: TBS
- Announcers: Ken Squier, Buddy Baker, Dick Berggren

Radio in the United States
- Radio: Motor Racing Network

The 1996 Miller 500 was the 17th stock car race of the 1996 NASCAR Winston Cup Series and the 24th iteration of the event. The race was held on Sunday, July 21, 1996, in Long Pond, Pennsylvania, at Pocono Raceway, a 2.5 miles (4.0 km) triangular permanent course. The race took the scheduled 200 laps to complete. In the final laps of the race, Penske Racing South driver Rusty Wallace would manage to pull away from the field on the final restart with 14 to go to take his 45th career NASCAR Winston Cup Series victory and his fifth victory of the season. To fill out the top three, Rudd Performance Motorsports driver Ricky Rudd and Robert Yates Racing driver Dale Jarrett would finish second and third, respectively.

== Background ==
The layout of Pocono Raceway, the venue where the race was held.

The race was held at Pocono Raceway, which is a three-turn superspeedway located in Long Pond, Pennsylvania. Pocono Raceway is one of a very few NASCAR tracks not owned by either Speedway Motorsports, Inc. or International Speedway Corporation. It is operated by the Igdalsky siblings Brandon, Nicholas, and sister Ashley, and cousins Joseph IV and Chase Mattioli, all of whom are third-generation members of the family-owned Mattco Inc, started by Joseph II and Rose Mattioli.

=== Entry list ===
- (R) denotes rookie driver.

#	Driver	Team	Make
1	Rick Mast	Precision Products Racing	Pontiac
2	Rusty Wallace	Penske Racing South	Ford
3	Dale Earnhardt	Richard Childress Racing	Chevrolet
4	Sterling Marlin	Morgan–McClure Motorsports	Chevrolet
5	Terry Labonte	Hendrick Motorsports	Chevrolet
6	Mark Martin	Roush Racing	Ford
7	Geoff Bodine	Geoff Bodine Racing	Ford
8	Hut Stricklin	Stavola Brothers Racing	Ford
9	Lake Speed	Melling Racing	Ford
10	Ricky Rudd	Rudd Performance Motorsports	Ford
11	Brett Bodine	Brett Bodine Racing	Ford
12	Derrike Cope	Bobby Allison Motorsports	Ford
14	Jeff Green	Dale Earnhardt, Inc.	Chevrolet
15	Wally Dallenbach Jr.	Bud Moore Engineering	Ford
16	Ted Musgrave	Roush Racing	Ford
17	Darrell Waltrip	Darrell Waltrip Motorsports	Chevrolet
18	Bobby Labonte	Joe Gibbs Racing	Chevrolet
19	Loy Allen Jr.	TriStar Motorsports	Ford
21	Michael Waltrip	Wood Brothers Racing	Ford
22	Ward Burton	Bill Davis Racing	Pontiac
23	Jimmy Spencer	Haas-Carter Motorsports	Ford
24	Jeff Gordon	Hendrick Motorsports	Chevrolet
25	Ken Schrader	Hendrick Motorsports	Chevrolet
28	Ernie Irvan	Robert Yates Racing	Ford
29	Greg Sacks	Diamond Ridge Motorsports	Chevrolet
30	Johnny Benson Jr. (R)	Bahari Racing	Pontiac
33	Robert Pressley	Leo Jackson Motorsports	Chevrolet
37	Jeremy Mayfield	Kranefuss-Haas Racing	Ford
41	Ricky Craven	Larry Hedrick Motorsports	Chevrolet
42	Kyle Petty	Team SABCO	Pontiac
43	Bobby Hamilton	Petty Enterprises	Pontiac
71	Dave Marcis	Marcis Auto Racing	Chevrolet
75	Morgan Shepherd	Butch Mock Motorsports	Ford
77	Bobby Hillin Jr.	Jasper Motorsports	Ford
78	Randy MacDonald	Triad Motorsports	Ford
81	Kenny Wallace	FILMAR Racing	Ford
87	Joe Nemechek	NEMCO Motorsports	Chevrolet
88	Dale Jarrett	Robert Yates Racing	Ford
90	Dick Trickle	Donlavey Racing	Ford
94	Bill Elliott	Bill Elliott Racing	Ford
98	Jeremy Mayfield	Cale Yarborough Motorsports	Ford
99	Jeff Burton	Roush Racing	Ford

== Qualifying ==
Qualifying was originally scheduled to be split into two rounds. The first round was scheduled to be held on Friday, July 19, at 3:00 PM EST. However, only six drivers were able to set a lap before qualifying was rained out and postponed until Friday, July 20, at 9:00 AM EST. Qualifying was eventually combined into only one round. Each driver would have one lap to set a time. For this specific race, positions 26-38 would be decided on time, and depending on who needed it, a select amount of positions were given to cars who had not otherwise qualified but were high enough in owner's points.

Mark Martin, driving for Roush Racing, would win the pole, setting a time of 53.441 and an average speed of 168.410 miles per hour (271.030 km/h).

No drivers would fail to qualify.

=== Full qualifying results ===
Pos.	#	Driver	Team	Make	Time	Speed
1	6	Mark Martin	Roush Racing	Ford	53.441	168.410
2	75	Morgan Shepherd	Butch Mock Motorsports	Ford	53.737	167.482
3	18	Bobby Labonte	Joe Gibbs Racing	Chevrolet	53.738	167.479
4	7	Geoff Bodine	Geoff Bodine Racing	Ford	53.906	166.957
5	22	Ward Burton	Bill Davis Racing	Pontiac	53.910	166.945
6	30	Johnny Benson Jr. (R)	Bahari Racing	Pontiac	53.976	166.741
7	10	Ricky Rudd	Rudd Performance Motorsports	Ford	53.993	166.688
8	3	Dale Earnhardt	Richard Childress Racing	Chevrolet	53.997	166.676
9	99	Jeff Burton	Roush Racing	Ford	53.998	166.673
10	12	Derrike Cope	Bobby Allison Motorsports	Ford	54.007	166.645
11	9	Lake Speed	Melling Racing	Ford	54.070	166.451
12	94	Bill Elliott	Bill Elliott Racing	Ford	54.109	166.331
13	2	Rusty Wallace	Penske Racing South	Ford	54.118	166.303
14	87	Joe Nemechek	NEMCO Motorsports	Chevrolet	54.131	166.263
15	24	Jeff Gordon	Hendrick Motorsports	Chevrolet	54.136	166.248
16	11	Brett Bodine	Brett Bodine Racing	Ford	54.271	165.834
17	4	Sterling Marlin	Morgan–McClure Motorsports	Chevrolet	54.297	165.755
18	23	Jimmy Spencer	Travis Carter Enterprises	Ford	54.306	165.728
19	78	Randy MacDonald	Triad Motorsports	Ford	54.315	165.700
20	88	Dale Jarrett	Robert Yates Racing	Ford	54.357	165.572
21	5	Terry Labonte	Hendrick Motorsports	Chevrolet	54.367	165.542
22	25	Ken Schrader	Hendrick Motorsports	Chevrolet	54.377	165.511
23	1	Rick Mast	Precision Products Racing	Pontiac	54.400	165.441
24	21	Michael Waltrip	Wood Brothers Racing	Ford	54.418	165.386
25	81	Kenny Wallace	FILMAR Racing	Ford	54.440	165.320
26	42	Kyle Petty	Team SABCO	Pontiac	54.479	165.201
27	15	Wally Dallenbach Jr.	Bud Moore Engineering	Ford	54.482	165.192
28	16	Ted Musgrave	Roush Racing	Ford	54.485	165.183
29	71	Dave Marcis	Marcis Auto Racing	Chevrolet	54.504	165.125
30	77	Bobby Hillin Jr.	Jasper Motorsports	Ford	54.541	165.013
31	43	Bobby Hamilton	Petty Enterprises	Pontiac	54.548	164.992
32	98	Jeremy Mayfield	Cale Yarborough Motorsports	Ford	54.569	164.929
33	90	Dick Trickle	Donlavey Racing	Ford	54.601	164.832
34	41	Ricky Craven	Larry Hedrick Motorsports	Chevrolet	54.661	164.651
35	28	Ernie Irvan	Robert Yates Racing	Ford	54.737	164.423
36	37	John Andretti	Kranefuss-Haas Racing	Ford	54.965	163.741
37	14	Jeff Green	Dale Earnhardt, Inc.	Chevrolet	55.088	163.375
38	29	Greg Sacks	Diamond Ridge Motorsports	Chevrolet	55.100	163.339
Provisionals
39	33	Robert Pressley	Leo Jackson Motorsports	Chevrolet	-*	-*
40	8	Hut Stricklin	Stavola Brothers Racing	Ford	-*	-*
41	17	Darrell Waltrip	Darrell Waltrip Motorsports	Chevrolet	-*	-*
Official starting lineup

== Race results ==
Fin	St	#	Driver	Team	Make	Laps	Led	Status	Pts	Winnings
1	13	2	Rusty Wallace	Penske Racing South	Ford	200	30	running	180	$59,165
2	7	10	Ricky Rudd	Rudd Performance Motorsports	Ford	200	9	running	175	$56,615
3	20	88	Dale Jarrett	Robert Yates Racing	Ford	200	13	running	170	$35,705
4	35	28	Ernie Irvan	Robert Yates Racing	Ford	200	10	running	165	$44,590
5	6	30	Johnny Benson Jr. (R)	Bahari Racing	Pontiac	200	5	running	160	$36,400
6	17	4	Sterling Marlin	Morgan–McClure Motorsports	Chevrolet	200	0	running	150	$35,925
7	15	24	Jeff Gordon	Hendrick Motorsports	Chevrolet	200	1	running	151	$35,825
8	11	9	Lake Speed	Melling Racing	Ford	200	0	running	142	$24,925
9	1	6	Mark Martin	Roush Racing	Ford	200	121	running	148	$46,950
10	10	12	Derrike Cope	Bobby Allison Motorsports	Ford	200	0	running	134	$27,825
11	4	7	Geoff Bodine	Geoff Bodine Racing	Ford	200	3	running	135	$22,975
12	32	98	Jeremy Mayfield	Cale Yarborough Motorsports	Ford	199	0	running	127	$15,625
13	24	21	Michael Waltrip	Wood Brothers Racing	Ford	199	0	running	124	$22,325
14	8	3	Dale Earnhardt	Richard Childress Racing	Chevrolet	199	0	running	121	$27,925
15	22	25	Ken Schrader	Hendrick Motorsports	Chevrolet	199	0	running	118	$22,925
16	21	5	Terry Labonte	Hendrick Motorsports	Chevrolet	199	0	running	115	$27,025
17	2	75	Morgan Shepherd	Butch Mock Motorsports	Ford	199	2	running	117	$14,525
18	33	90	Dick Trickle	Donlavey Racing	Ford	199	0	running	109	$14,225
19	28	16	Ted Musgrave	Roush Racing	Ford	199	0	running	106	$20,975
20	34	41	Ricky Craven	Larry Hedrick Motorsports	Chevrolet	199	0	running	103	$22,550
21	12	94	Bill Elliott	Bill Elliott Racing	Ford	199	0	running	100	$20,425
22	5	22	Ward Burton	Bill Davis Racing	Pontiac	199	0	running	97	$24,825
23	36	37	John Andretti	Kranefuss-Haas Racing	Ford	199	0	running	94	$20,100
24	18	23	Jimmy Spencer	Travis Carter Enterprises	Ford	198	0	running	91	$19,950
25	39	33	Robert Pressley	Leo Jackson Motorsports	Chevrolet	198	0	running	88	$19,975
26	26	42	Kyle Petty	Team SABCO	Pontiac	198	1	running	90	$19,625
27	16	11	Brett Bodine	Brett Bodine Racing	Ford	198	0	running	82	$19,475
28	29	71	Dave Marcis	Marcis Auto Racing	Chevrolet	197	0	running	79	$12,425
29	38	29	Greg Sacks	Diamond Ridge Motorsports	Chevrolet	197	3	running	81	$18,875
30	23	1	Rick Mast	Precision Products Racing	Pontiac	196	0	running	73	$16,325
31	19	78	Randy MacDonald	Triad Motorsports	Ford	195	0	running	70	$9,275
32	40	8	Hut Stricklin	Stavola Brothers Racing	Ford	194	0	running	67	$9,225
33	27	15	Wally Dallenbach Jr.	Bud Moore Engineering	Ford	189	0	running	64	$16,175
34	14	87	Joe Nemechek	NEMCO Motorsports	Chevrolet	179	2	crash	66	$16,050
35	9	99	Jeff Burton	Roush Racing	Ford	176	0	running	58	$8,975
36	25	81	Kenny Wallace	FILMAR Racing	Ford	175	0	engine	55	$8,900
37	3	18	Bobby Labonte	Joe Gibbs Racing	Chevrolet	168	0	engine	52	$24,835
38	30	77	Bobby Hillin Jr.	Jasper Motorsports	Ford	139	0	engine	49	$8,125
39	31	43	Bobby Hamilton	Petty Enterprises	Pontiac	6	0	crash	46	$16,125
40	41	17	Darrell Waltrip	Darrell Waltrip Motorsports	Chevrolet	4	0	crash	43	$15,125
41	37	14	Jeff Green	Dale Earnhardt, Inc.	Chevrolet	2	0	crash	40	$8,125
Official race results

Previous race: 1996 Jiffy Lube 300	NASCAR Winston Cup Series; 1996 season	Next race: 1996 DieHard 500
