= 1996 UAW-GM Teamwork 500 =

13th race of the 1996 NASCAR Winston Cup Series

Race details
- Race 13 of 31 in the 1996 NASCAR Winston Cup Series
- The 1996 UAW-GM Teamwork 500 program cover, featuring Terry Labonte.
- Date: June 16, 1996
- Official name: 15th Annual UAW-GM Teamwork 500
- Location: Long Pond, Pennsylvania, Pocono Raceway
- Course: Permanent racing facility
- Course length: 2.5 miles (4.0 km)
- Distance: 200 laps, 500 mi (804.672 km)
- Average speed: 139.104 miles per hour (223.866 km/h)

Pole position
Driver	Jeff Gordon	Hendrick Motorsports
- Time: 53.027

Most laps led
Driver	Jeff Gordon	Hendrick Motorsports
- Laps: 94

Winner
No. 24	Jeff Gordon	Hendrick Motorsports

Television in the United States
- Network: TNN
- Announcers: Eli Gold, Buddy Baker, Dick Berggren

Radio in the United States
- Radio: Motor Racing Network

The 1996 UAW-GM Teamwork 500 was the 13th stock car race of the 1996 NASCAR Winston Cup Series and the 15th iteration of the event. The race was held on Sunday, June 16, 1996, in Long Pond, Pennsylvania, at Pocono Raceway, a 2.5 miles (4.0 km) triangular permanent course. The race took the scheduled 200 laps to complete. At race's end, Hendrick Motorsports driver Jeff Gordon would manage to dominate a majority of the race, leading 94 laps en route to his 14th career NASCAR Winston Cup Series victory, his fifth victory of the season, and his second consecutive victory. To fill out the top three, Rudd Performance Motorsports driver Ricky Rudd and Geoff Bodine Racing driver Geoff Bodine would finish second and third, respectively.

== Background ==
The layout of Pocono Raceway, the venue where the race was held.

The race was held at Pocono Raceway, which is a three-turn superspeedway located in Long Pond, Pennsylvania. Pocono Raceway is one of a very few NASCAR tracks not owned by either Speedway Motorsports, Inc. or International Speedway Corporation. It is operated by the Igdalsky siblings Brandon, Nicholas, and sister Ashley, and cousins Joseph IV and Chase Mattioli, all of whom are third-generation members of the family-owned Mattco Inc, started by Joseph II and Rose Mattioli.

=== Entry list ===
- (R) denotes rookie driver.

#	Driver	Team	Make
1	Rick Mast	Precision Products Racing	Pontiac
2	Rusty Wallace	Penske Racing South	Ford
3	Dale Earnhardt	Richard Childress Racing	Chevrolet
4	Sterling Marlin	Morgan–McClure Motorsports	Chevrolet
5	Terry Labonte	Hendrick Motorsports	Chevrolet
6	Mark Martin	Roush Racing	Ford
7	Geoff Bodine	Geoff Bodine Racing	Ford
8	Hut Stricklin	Stavola Brothers Racing	Ford
9	Lake Speed	Melling Racing	Ford
10	Ricky Rudd	Rudd Performance Motorsports	Ford
11	Brett Bodine	Brett Bodine Racing	Ford
12	Derrike Cope	Bobby Allison Motorsports	Ford
14	Jeff Green	Dale Earnhardt, Inc.	Chevrolet
15	Wally Dallenbach Jr.	Bud Moore Engineering	Ford
16	Ted Musgrave	Roush Racing	Ford
17	Darrell Waltrip	Darrell Waltrip Motorsports	Chevrolet
18	Bobby Labonte	Joe Gibbs Racing	Chevrolet
19	Loy Allen Jr.	TriStar Motorsports	Ford
21	Michael Waltrip	Wood Brothers Racing	Ford
22	Ward Burton	Bill Davis Racing	Pontiac
23	Jimmy Spencer	Haas-Carter Motorsports	Ford
24	Jeff Gordon	Hendrick Motorsports	Chevrolet
25	Ken Schrader	Hendrick Motorsports	Chevrolet
28	Ernie Irvan	Robert Yates Racing	Ford
29	Steve Grissom	Diamond Ridge Motorsports	Chevrolet
30	Johnny Benson Jr. (R)	Bahari Racing	Pontiac
33	Robert Pressley	Leo Jackson Motorsports	Chevrolet
37	Jeremy Mayfield	Kranefuss-Haas Racing	Ford
41	Ricky Craven	Larry Hedrick Motorsports	Chevrolet
42	Kyle Petty	Team SABCO	Pontiac
43	Bobby Hamilton	Petty Enterprises	Pontiac
71	Dave Marcis	Marcis Auto Racing	Chevrolet
75	Morgan Shepherd	Butch Mock Motorsports	Ford
77	Bobby Hillin Jr.	Jasper Motorsports	Ford
78	Randy MacDonald	Triad Motorsports	Ford
81	Kenny Wallace	FILMAR Racing	Ford
87	Joe Nemechek	NEMCO Motorsports	Chevrolet
88	Dale Jarrett	Robert Yates Racing	Ford
90	Mike Wallace	Donlavey Racing	Ford
94	Todd Bodine	Bill Elliott Racing	Ford
98	Jeremy Mayfield	Cale Yarborough Motorsports	Ford
99	Jeff Burton	Roush Racing	Ford

== Qualifying ==
Qualifying was split into two rounds. The first round was held on Friday, May 31, at 3:00 PM EST. Each driver would have one lap to set a time. During the first round, the top 25 drivers in the round would be guaranteed a starting spot in the race. If a driver was not able to guarantee a spot in the first round, they had the option to scrub their time from the first round and try and run a faster lap time in a second round qualifying run, held on Saturday, June 1, at 11:30 AM EST. As with the first round, each driver would have one lap to set a time. For this specific race, positions 26-38 would be decided on time, and depending on who needed it, a select amount of positions were given to cars who had not otherwise qualified but were high enough in owner's points.

Jeff Gordon, driving for Hendrick Motorsports, would win the pole, setting a time of 53.027 and an average speed of 169.725 miles per hour (273.146 km/h).

=== Full qualifying results ===
Pos.	#	Driver	Team	Make	Time	Speed
1	24	Jeff Gordon	Hendrick Motorsports	Chevrolet	53.027	169.725
2	12	Derrike Cope	Bobby Allison Motorsports	Ford	53.189	169.208
3	8	Hut Stricklin	Stavola Brothers Racing	Ford	53.200	169.173
4	41	Ricky Craven	Larry Hedrick Motorsports	Chevrolet	53.273	168.941
5	25	Ken Schrader	Hendrick Motorsports	Chevrolet	53.357	168.675
6	6	Mark Martin	Roush Racing	Ford	53.359	168.669
7	18	Bobby Labonte	Joe Gibbs Racing	Chevrolet	53.428	168.451
8	87	Joe Nemechek	NEMCO Motorsports	Chevrolet	53.454	168.369
9	10	Ricky Rudd	Rudd Performance Motorsports	Ford	53.518	168.168
10	3	Dale Earnhardt	Richard Childress Racing	Chevrolet	53.528	168.136
11	5	Terry Labonte	Hendrick Motorsports	Chevrolet	53.563	168.026
12	22	Ward Burton	Bill Davis Racing	Pontiac	53.595	167.926
13	1	Rick Mast	Precision Products Racing	Pontiac	53.626	167.829
14	21	Michael Waltrip	Wood Brothers Racing	Ford	53.688	167.635
15	43	Bobby Hamilton	Petty Enterprises	Pontiac	53.702	167.592
16	99	Jeff Burton	Roush Racing	Ford	53.788	167.324
17	28	Ernie Irvan	Robert Yates Racing	Ford	53.796	167.299
18	23	Jimmy Spencer	Travis Carter Enterprises	Ford	53.800	167.286
19	2	Rusty Wallace	Penske Racing South	Ford	53.813	167.246
20	37	John Andretti	Kranefuss-Haas Racing	Ford	53.827	167.202
21	9	Lake Speed	Melling Racing	Ford	53.940	166.852
22	11	Brett Bodine	Brett Bodine Racing	Ford	53.974	166.747
23	4	Sterling Marlin	Morgan–McClure Motorsports	Chevrolet	53.978	166.735
24	94	Todd Bodine	Bill Elliott Racing	Ford	53.999	166.670
25	19	Loy Allen Jr.	TriStar Motorsports	Ford	54.004	166.654
Failed to lock in Round 1
26	7	Geoff Bodine	Geoff Bodine Racing	Ford	53.442	168.407
27	75	Morgan Shepherd	Butch Mock Motorsports	Ford	53.502	168.218
28	88	Dale Jarrett	Robert Yates Racing	Ford	53.544	168.086
29	15	Wally Dallenbach Jr.	Bud Moore Engineering	Ford	53.749	167.445
30	16	Ted Musgrave	Roush Racing	Ford	53.760	167.411
31	77	Bobby Hillin Jr.	Jasper Motorsports	Ford	53.882	167.032
32	17	Darrell Waltrip	Darrell Waltrip Motorsports	Chevrolet	53.917	166.923
33	14	Jeff Green	Dale Earnhardt, Inc.	Chevrolet	54.046	166.525
34	98	Jeremy Mayfield	Cale Yarborough Motorsports	Ford	54.100	166.359
35	33	Robert Pressley	Leo Jackson Motorsports	Chevrolet	54.136	166.248
36	78	Randy MacDonald	Triad Motorsports	Ford	54.159	166.177
37	29	Steve Grissom	Diamond Ridge Motorsports	Chevrolet	54.163	166.165
38	42	Kyle Petty	Team SABCO	Pontiac	54.186	166.095
Provisionals
39	30	Johnny Benson Jr. (R)	Bahari Racing	Pontiac	-*	-*
40	90	Dick Trickle	Donlavey Racing	Ford	-*	-*
41	81	Kenny Wallace	FILMAR Racing	Ford	-*	-*
Failed to qualify
42	71	Dave Marcis	Marcis Auto Racing	Chevrolet	-*	-*
Official first round qualifying results
Official starting lineup

*Time not available.

== Race results ==
Fin	St	#	Driver	Team	Make	Laps	Led	Status	Pts	Winnings
1	1	24	Jeff Gordon	Hendrick Motorsports	Chevrolet	200	94	running	185	$96,980
2	9	10	Ricky Rudd	Rudd Performance Motorsports	Ford	200	11	running	175	$52,900
3	26	7	Geoff Bodine	Geoff Bodine Racing	Ford	200	12	running	170	$54,700
4	6	6	Mark Martin	Roush Racing	Ford	200	11	running	165	$38,975
5	15	43	Bobby Hamilton	Petty Enterprises	Pontiac	200	2	running	160	$31,875
6	27	75	Morgan Shepherd	Butch Mock Motorsports	Ford	200	2	running	155	$19,305
7	11	5	Terry Labonte	Hendrick Motorsports	Chevrolet	200	1	running	151	$29,905
8	18	23	Jimmy Spencer	Travis Carter Enterprises	Ford	200	0	running	142	$24,205
9	16	99	Jeff Burton	Roush Racing	Ford	200	0	running	138	$16,605
10	24	94	Todd Bodine	Bill Elliott Racing	Ford	200	0	running	134	$26,405
11	23	4	Sterling Marlin	Morgan–McClure Motorsports	Chevrolet	200	0	running	130	$28,055
12	29	15	Wally Dallenbach Jr.	Bud Moore Engineering	Ford	200	0	running	127	$23,205
13	31	77	Bobby Hillin Jr.	Jasper Motorsports	Ford	200	0	running	124	$11,005
14	14	21	Michael Waltrip	Wood Brothers Racing	Ford	200	0	running	121	$21,805
15	34	98	Jeremy Mayfield	Cale Yarborough Motorsports	Ford	200	0	running	118	$15,505
16	20	37	John Andretti	Kranefuss-Haas Racing	Ford	200	0	running	115	$21,205
17	4	41	Ricky Craven	Larry Hedrick Motorsports	Chevrolet	199	1	running	117	$21,005
18	5	25	Ken Schrader	Hendrick Motorsports	Chevrolet	199	0	running	109	$20,805
19	30	16	Ted Musgrave	Roush Racing	Ford	199	0	running	106	$20,555
20	39	42	Kyle Petty	Team SABCO	Pontiac	199	2	running	108	$22,130
21	8	87	Joe Nemechek	NEMCO Motorsports	Chevrolet	198	0	running	100	$19,935
22	37	29	Steve Grissom	Diamond Ridge Motorsports	Chevrolet	198	0	running	97	$19,735
23	25	19	Loy Allen Jr.	TriStar Motorsports	Ford	197	0	running	94	$12,510
24	36	78	Randy MacDonald	Triad Motorsports	Ford	197	0	running	91	$9,460
25	40	30	Johnny Benson Jr. (R)	Bahari Racing	Pontiac	191	0	running	88	$20,585
26	41	90	Dick Trickle	Donlavey Racing	Ford	188	0	handling	85	$11,835
27	2	12	Derrike Cope	Bobby Allison Motorsports	Ford	183	25	running	87	$16,285
28	13	1	Rick Mast	Precision Products Racing	Pontiac	180	0	engine	79	$16,235
29	3	8	Hut Stricklin	Stavola Brothers Racing	Ford	170	19	running	81	$10,185
30	32	17	Darrell Waltrip	Darrell Waltrip Motorsports	Chevrolet	159	0	engine	73	$16,135
31	19	2	Rusty Wallace	Penske Racing South	Ford	152	20	running	75	$34,085
32	10	3	Dale Earnhardt	Richard Childress Racing	Chevrolet	135	0	engine	67	$26,035
33	35	33	Robert Pressley	Leo Jackson Motorsports	Chevrolet	126	0	engine	64	$15,935
34	21	9	Lake Speed	Melling Racing	Ford	98	0	crash	61	$15,860
35	12	22	Ward Burton	Bill Davis Racing	Pontiac	94	0	piston	58	$23,785
36	33	14	Jeff Green	Dale Earnhardt, Inc.	Chevrolet	89	0	engine	55	$8,710
37	38	81	Kenny Wallace	FILMAR Racing	Ford	70	0	engine	52	$8,645
38	28	88	Dale Jarrett	Robert Yates Racing	Ford	37	0	crankshaft	49	$16,520
39	17	28	Ernie Irvan	Robert Yates Racing	Ford	27	0	crash	46	$23,520
40	22	11	Brett Bodine	Brett Bodine Racing	Ford	26	0	crash	43	$15,520
41	7	18	Bobby Labonte	Joe Gibbs Racing	Chevrolet	2	0	crash	40	$24,520
Official race results

Previous race: 1996 Miller 500 (Dover)	NASCAR Winston Cup Series; 1996 season	Next race: 1996 Miller 400 (Michigan)
