= 1996 Pepsi 400 =

15th race of the 1996 NASCAR Winston Cup Series

Race details
- Race 15 of 31 in the 1996 NASCAR Winston Cup Series
- The 1996 Pepsi 400 program cover, featuring Jeff Gordon.
- Date: July 6, 1996
- Official name: 38th Annual Pepsi 400
- Location: Daytona Beach, Florida, Daytona International Speedway
- Course: Permanent racing facility
- Course length: 2.5 miles (4.0 km)
- Distance: 117 laps, 292.5 mi (470.733 km)
- Scheduled distance: 160 laps, 400 mi (643.737 km)
- Average speed: 161.602 miles per hour (260.073 km/h)

Pole position
Driver	Jeff Gordon	Hendrick Motorsports
- Time: 47.652

Most laps led
Driver	Sterling Marlin	Morgan-McClure Motorsports
- Laps: 88

Winner
No. 4	Sterling Marlin	Morgan-McClure Motorsports

Television in the United States
- Network: ESPN
- Announcers: Bob Jenkins, Benny Parsons

Radio in the United States
- Radio: Motor Racing Network

The 1996 Pepsi 400 was the 15th stock car race of the 1996 NASCAR Winston Cup Series and the 38th iteration of the event. The race was held on Saturday, July 6, 1996, in Daytona Beach, Florida at Daytona International Speedway, a 2.5 miles (4.0 km) permanent triangular-shaped superspeedway. The race was shortened from its scheduled 160 laps to 117 laps due to rain. After suffering an ignition failure in the middle of the race, Morgan–McClure Motorsports driver Sterling Marlin was able to come back through the field and dominate a majority of the race when the race ended due to the rain. The win was Marlin's sixth career NASCAR Winston Cup Series victory and his second and final victory of the season. To fill out the top three, Terry Labonte and Jeff Gordon, both drivers for Hendrick Motorsports, would finish second and third, respectively.

== Background ==
The layout of Daytona International Speedway, the venue where the race was held.

Daytona International Speedway is one of three superspeedways to hold NASCAR races, the other two being Indianapolis Motor Speedway and Talladega Superspeedway. The standard track at Daytona International Speedway is a four-turn superspeedway that is 2.5 miles (4.0 km) long. The track's turns are banked at 31 degrees, while the front stretch, the location of the finish line, is banked at 18 degrees.

=== Entry list ===
- (R) denotes rookie driver.

#	Driver	Team	Make
1	Rick Mast	Precision Products Racing	Pontiac
2	Rusty Wallace	Penske Racing South	Ford
3	Dale Earnhardt	Richard Childress Racing	Chevrolet
4	Sterling Marlin	Morgan–McClure Motorsports	Chevrolet
5	Terry Labonte	Hendrick Motorsports	Chevrolet
6	Mark Martin	Roush Racing	Ford
7	Geoff Bodine	Geoff Bodine Racing	Ford
8	Hut Stricklin	Stavola Brothers Racing	Ford
9	Lake Speed	Melling Racing	Ford
10	Ricky Rudd	Rudd Performance Motorsports	Ford
11	Brett Bodine	Brett Bodine Racing	Ford
12	Derrike Cope	Bobby Allison Motorsports	Ford
15	Wally Dallenbach Jr.	Bud Moore Engineering	Ford
16	Ted Musgrave	Roush Racing	Ford
17	Darrell Waltrip	Darrell Waltrip Motorsports	Chevrolet
18	Bobby Labonte	Joe Gibbs Racing	Chevrolet
19	Loy Allen Jr.	TriStar Motorsports	Ford
21	Michael Waltrip	Wood Brothers Racing	Ford
22	Ward Burton	Bill Davis Racing	Pontiac
23	Jimmy Spencer	Haas-Carter Motorsports	Ford
24	Jeff Gordon	Hendrick Motorsports	Chevrolet
25	Ken Schrader	Hendrick Motorsports	Chevrolet
28	Ernie Irvan	Robert Yates Racing	Ford
29	Greg Sacks	Diamond Ridge Motorsports	Chevrolet
30	Johnny Benson Jr. (R)	Bahari Racing	Pontiac
33	Robert Pressley	Leo Jackson Motorsports	Chevrolet
37	Jeremy Mayfield	Kranefuss-Haas Racing	Ford
41	Ricky Craven	Larry Hedrick Motorsports	Chevrolet
42	Kyle Petty	Team SABCO	Pontiac
43	Bobby Hamilton	Petty Enterprises	Pontiac
44	Jeff Purvis	Phoenix Racing	Chevrolet
71	Dave Marcis	Marcis Auto Racing	Chevrolet
75	Morgan Shepherd	Butch Mock Motorsports	Ford
77	Bobby Hillin Jr.	Jasper Motorsports	Ford
81	Kenny Wallace	FILMAR Racing	Ford
87	Joe Nemechek	NEMCO Motorsports	Chevrolet
88	Dale Jarrett	Robert Yates Racing	Ford
90	Dick Trickle	Donlavey Racing	Ford
94	Bill Elliott	Bill Elliott Racing	Ford
95	Gary Bradberry	Sadler Brothers Racing	Ford
98	Jeremy Mayfield	Cale Yarborough Motorsports	Ford
99	Jeff Burton	Roush Racing	Ford

== Qualifying ==
Qualifying was split into two rounds. The first round was scheduled to be held on Thursday, July 4, at 2:30 PM EST. However, only nine drivers were able to set a lap before qualifying was rained out and postponed until Friday, July 5, at 9:00 AM EST. Each driver would have two laps to set a time, the fastest of which would count as their qualifying lap. During the first round, the top 25 drivers in the round would be guaranteed a starting spot in the race. If a driver was not able to guarantee a spot in the first round, they had the option to scrub their time from the first round and try and run a faster lap time in a second round qualifying run, held on Friday, July 5, at 1:00 PM EST. As with the first round, each driver would have two laps to set a time. For this specific race, positions 26-38 would be decided on time, and depending on who needed it, a select amount of positions were given to cars who had not otherwise qualified but were high enough in owner's points.

Jeff Gordon, driving for Hendrick Motorsports, would win the pole, setting a time of 47.652 and an average speed of 188.869 miles per hour (303.955 km/h).

No drivers would fail to qualify.

=== Full qualifying results ===
Pos.	#	Driver	Team	Make	Time	Speed
1	24	Jeff Gordon	Hendrick Motorsports	Chevrolet	47.652	188.869
2	4	Sterling Marlin	Morgan–McClure Motorsports	Chevrolet	48.075	187.207
3	88	Dale Jarrett	Robert Yates Racing	Ford	48.117	187.044
4	17	Darrell Waltrip	Darrell Waltrip Motorsports	Chevrolet	48.186	186.776
5	30	Johnny Benson Jr. (R)	Bahari Racing	Pontiac	48.218	186.652
6	44	Jeff Purvis	Phoenix Racing	Chevrolet	48.264	186.474
7	3	Dale Earnhardt	Richard Childress Racing	Chevrolet	48.281	186.409
8	25	Ken Schrader	Hendrick Motorsports	Chevrolet	48.352	186.135
9	9	Lake Speed	Melling Racing	Ford	48.361	186.100
10	18	Bobby Labonte	Joe Gibbs Racing	Chevrolet	48.370	186.066
11	2	Rusty Wallace	Penske Racing South	Ford	48.376	186.043
12	5	Terry Labonte	Hendrick Motorsports	Chevrolet	48.384	186.012
13	90	Dick Trickle	Donlavey Racing	Ford	48.402	185.943
14	28	Ernie Irvan	Robert Yates Racing	Ford	48.413	185.900
15	8	Hut Stricklin	Stavola Brothers Racing	Ford	48.414	185.897
16	33	Robert Pressley	Leo Jackson Motorsports	Chevrolet	48.498	185.575
17	12	Derrike Cope	Bobby Allison Motorsports	Ford	48.502	185.559
18	75	Morgan Shepherd	Butch Mock Motorsports	Ford	48.541	185.410
19	43	Bobby Hamilton	Petty Enterprises	Pontiac	48.543	185.403
20	87	Joe Nemechek	NEMCO Motorsports	Chevrolet	48.547	185.387
21	81	Kenny Wallace	FILMAR Racing	Ford	48.576	185.277
22	37	John Andretti	Kranefuss-Haas Racing	Ford	48.582	185.254
23	21	Michael Waltrip	Wood Brothers Racing	Ford	48.603	185.174
24	98	Jeremy Mayfield	Cale Yarborough Motorsports	Ford	48.703	184.794
25	41	Ricky Craven	Larry Hedrick Motorsports	Chevrolet	48.717	184.740
Failed to lock in Round 1
26	71	Dave Marcis	Marcis Auto Racing	Chevrolet	48.286	186.389
27	23	Jimmy Spencer	Travis Carter Enterprises	Ford	48.735	184.672
28	94	Bill Elliott	Bill Elliott Racing	Ford	48.738	184.661
29	95	Gary Bradberry	Sadler Brothers Racing	Ford	48.823	184.339
30	29	Greg Sacks	Diamond Ridge Motorsports	Chevrolet	48.828	184.320
31	77	Bobby Hillin Jr.	Jasper Motorsports	Ford	48.858	184.207
32	1	Rick Mast	Precision Products Racing	Pontiac	48.891	184.083
33	99	Jeff Burton	Roush Racing	Ford	48.941	183.895
34	22	Ward Burton	Bill Davis Racing	Pontiac	48.976	183.763
35	15	Wally Dallenbach Jr.	Bud Moore Engineering	Ford	48.985	183.730
36	11	Brett Bodine	Brett Bodine Racing	Ford	49.012	183.628
37	42	Kyle Petty	Team SABCO	Pontiac	49.035	183.542
38	16	Ted Musgrave	Roush Racing	Ford	49.086	183.352
Provisionals
39	10	Ricky Rudd	Rudd Performance Motorsports	Ford	-*	-*
40	6	Mark Martin	Roush Racing	Ford	-*	-*
41	7	Geoff Bodine	Geoff Bodine Racing	Ford	-*	-*
42	19	Loy Allen Jr.	TriStar Motorsports	Ford	-*	-*
Official starting lineup

== Race results ==
Fin	St	#	Driver	Team	Make	Laps	Led	Status	Pts	Winnings
1	2	4	Sterling Marlin	Morgan–McClure Motorsports	Chevrolet	117	88	running	185	$106,565
2	12	5	Terry Labonte	Hendrick Motorsports	Chevrolet	117	0	running	170	$63,335
3	1	24	Jeff Gordon	Hendrick Motorsports	Chevrolet	117	7	running	170	$63,735
4	7	3	Dale Earnhardt	Richard Childress Racing	Chevrolet	117	0	running	160	$97,960
5	14	28	Ernie Irvan	Robert Yates Racing	Ford	117	0	running	155	$44,210
6	3	88	Dale Jarrett	Robert Yates Racing	Ford	117	14	running	155	$30,910
7	23	21	Michael Waltrip	Wood Brothers Racing	Ford	117	6	running	151	$33,760
8	8	25	Ken Schrader	Hendrick Motorsports	Chevrolet	117	1	running	147	$31,660
9	36	11	Brett Bodine	Brett Bodine Racing	Ford	117	0	running	138	$37,760
10	27	23	Jimmy Spencer	Travis Carter Enterprises	Ford	117	0	running	134	$31,310
11	40	6	Mark Martin	Roush Racing	Ford	117	0	running	130	$34,095
12	35	15	Wally Dallenbach Jr.	Bud Moore Engineering	Ford	117	0	running	127	$27,990
13	38	16	Ted Musgrave	Roush Racing	Ford	117	0	running	124	$27,600
14	33	99	Jeff Burton	Roush Racing	Ford	117	0	running	121	$20,260
15	18	75	Morgan Shepherd	Butch Mock Motorsports	Ford	117	0	running	118	$20,920
16	19	43	Bobby Hamilton	Petty Enterprises	Pontiac	117	0	running	115	$26,530
17	16	33	Robert Pressley	Leo Jackson Motorsports	Chevrolet	117	0	running	112	$26,190
18	20	87	Joe Nemechek	NEMCO Motorsports	Chevrolet	117	0	running	109	$25,875
19	15	8	Hut Stricklin	Stavola Brothers Racing	Ford	117	0	running	106	$18,535
20	32	1	Rick Mast	Precision Products Racing	Pontiac	117	0	running	103	$25,670
21	6	44	Jeff Purvis	Phoenix Racing	Chevrolet	117	0	running	100	$14,550
22	25	41	Ricky Craven	Larry Hedrick Motorsports	Chevrolet	117	0	running	97	$24,730
23	22	37	John Andretti	Kranefuss-Haas Racing	Ford	117	0	running	94	$24,460
24	37	42	Kyle Petty	Team SABCO	Pontiac	117	1	running	96	$24,240
25	5	30	Johnny Benson Jr. (R)	Bahari Racing	Pontiac	117	0	running	88	$25,195
26	4	17	Darrell Waltrip	Darrell Waltrip Motorsports	Chevrolet	117	0	running	85	$23,835
27	24	98	Jeremy Mayfield	Cale Yarborough Motorsports	Ford	117	0	running	82	$16,180
28	13	90	Dick Trickle	Donlavey Racing	Ford	117	0	running	79	$13,560
29	9	9	Lake Speed	Melling Racing	Ford	116	0	running	76	$20,465
30	42	19	Loy Allen Jr.	TriStar Motorsports	Ford	116	0	running	73	$13,370
31	11	2	Rusty Wallace	Penske Racing South	Ford	116	0	running	70	$28,315
32	31	77	Bobby Hillin Jr.	Jasper Motorsports	Ford	116	0	running	67	$13,285
33	39	10	Ricky Rudd	Rudd Performance Motorsports	Ford	116	0	running	64	$28,255
34	41	7	Geoff Bodine	Geoff Bodine Racing	Ford	116	0	running	61	$20,225
35	29	95	Gary Bradberry	Sadler Brothers Racing	Ford	116	0	running	58	$13,195
36	26	71	Dave Marcis	Marcis Auto Racing	Chevrolet	115	0	running	55	$13,665
37	28	94	Bill Elliott	Bill Elliott Racing	Ford	109	0	running	52	$20,136
38	21	81	Kenny Wallace	FILMAR Racing	Ford	100	0	crash	49	$13,090
39	30	29	Greg Sacks	Diamond Ridge Motorsports	Chevrolet	95	0	crash	46	$20,090
40	10	18	Bobby Labonte	Joe Gibbs Racing	Chevrolet	95	0	engine	43	$29,090
41	34	22	Ward Burton	Bill Davis Racing	Pontiac	95	0	running	40	$28,090
42	17	12	Derrike Cope	Bobby Allison Motorsports	Ford	63	0	engine	37	$20,090
Official race results

Previous race: 1996 Miller 400 (Michigan)	NASCAR Winston Cup Series; 1996 season	Next race: 1996 Jiffy Lube 300
