= 1996 Jiffy Lube 300 =

16th race of the 1996 NASCAR Winston Cup Series

Race details
- Race 16 of 31 in the 1996 NASCAR Winston Cup Series
- The 1996 Jiffy Lube 300 program cover, featuring Jeff Gordon.
- Date: July 14, 1996
- Official name: 4th Annual Jiffy Lube 300
- Location: Loudon, New Hampshire, New Hampshire International Speedway
- Course: Permanent racing facility
- Course length: 1.058 miles (1.704 km)
- Distance: 300 laps, 317.4 mi (510.805 km)
- Average speed: 98.93 miles per hour (159.21 km/h)

Pole position
Driver	Ricky Craven	Larry Hedrick Motorsports
- Time: 29.439

Most laps led
Driver	Jeff Gordon	Hendrick Motorsports
- Laps: 59

Winner
No. 28	Ernie Irvan	Robert Yates Racing

Television in the United States
- Network: TNN
- Announcers: Eli Gold, Buddy Baker, Dick Berggren

Radio in the United States
- Radio: Motor Racing Network

The 1996 Jiffy Lube 300 was the 16th stock car race of the 1996 NASCAR Winston Cup Series and the fourth iteration of the event. The race was held on Sunday, July 14, 1996, in Loudon, New Hampshire, at New Hampshire International Speedway, a 1.058-mile (1.703 km) permanent, oval-shaped, low-banked racetrack. The race took the scheduled 300 laps to complete. In an emotional victory, Robert Yates Racing driver Ernie Irvan, who had recently came back from a near-fatal crash at the 1994 GM Goodwrench Dealer 400, would manage to dominate the late stages of the race to take his 13th career NASCAR Winston Cup Series victory, his first victory of the season, and his first victory in over two years. To fill out the top three, Robert Yates Racing driver Dale Jarrett and Rudd Performance Motorsports driver Ricky Rudd would finish second and third, respectively.

== Background ==
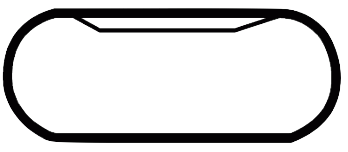
The layout of New Hampshire International Speedway, the venue where the race was held.

New Hampshire International Speedway is a 1.058-mile (1.703 km) oval speedway located in Loudon, New Hampshire which has hosted NASCAR racing annually since the early 1990s, as well as an IndyCar weekend and the oldest motorcycle race in North America, the Loudon Classic. Nicknamed "The Magic Mile", the speedway is often converted into a 1.6-mile (2.6 km) road course, which includes much of the oval. The track was originally the site of Bryar Motorsports Park before being purchased and redeveloped by Bob Bahre. The track is currently one of eight major NASCAR tracks owned and operated by Speedway Motorsports.

=== Entry list ===
- (R) denotes rookie driver.

#	Driver	Team	Make
1	Rick Mast	Precision Products Racing	Pontiac
2	Rusty Wallace	Penske Racing South	Ford
3	Dale Earnhardt	Richard Childress Racing	Chevrolet
4	Sterling Marlin	Morgan–McClure Motorsports	Chevrolet
5	Terry Labonte	Hendrick Motorsports	Chevrolet
6	Mark Martin	Roush Racing	Ford
7	Geoff Bodine	Geoff Bodine Racing	Ford
8	Hut Stricklin	Stavola Brothers Racing	Ford
9	Lake Speed	Melling Racing	Ford
10	Ricky Rudd	Rudd Performance Motorsports	Ford
11	Brett Bodine	Brett Bodine Racing	Ford
12	Derrike Cope	Bobby Allison Motorsports	Ford
15	Wally Dallenbach Jr.	Bud Moore Engineering	Ford
16	Ted Musgrave	Roush Racing	Ford
17	Darrell Waltrip	Darrell Waltrip Motorsports	Chevrolet
18	Bobby Labonte	Joe Gibbs Racing	Chevrolet
19	Loy Allen Jr.	TriStar Motorsports	Ford
21	Michael Waltrip	Wood Brothers Racing	Ford
22	Ward Burton	Bill Davis Racing	Pontiac
23	Jimmy Spencer	Haas-Carter Motorsports	Ford
24	Jeff Gordon	Hendrick Motorsports	Chevrolet
25	Ken Schrader	Hendrick Motorsports	Chevrolet
28	Ernie Irvan	Robert Yates Racing	Ford
29	Greg Sacks	Diamond Ridge Motorsports	Chevrolet
30	Johnny Benson Jr. (R)	Bahari Racing	Pontiac
33	Robert Pressley	Leo Jackson Motorsports	Chevrolet
37	Jeremy Mayfield	Kranefuss-Haas Racing	Ford
41	Ricky Craven	Larry Hedrick Motorsports	Chevrolet
42	Kyle Petty	Team SABCO	Pontiac
43	Bobby Hamilton	Petty Enterprises	Pontiac
71	Dave Marcis	Marcis Auto Racing	Chevrolet
75	Morgan Shepherd	Butch Mock Motorsports	Ford
77	Bobby Hillin Jr.	Jasper Motorsports	Ford
78	Randy MacDonald	Triad Motorsports	Ford
81	Kenny Wallace	FILMAR Racing	Ford
87	Joe Nemechek	NEMCO Motorsports	Chevrolet
88	Dale Jarrett	Robert Yates Racing	Ford
90	Dick Trickle	Donlavey Racing	Ford
94	Bill Elliott	Bill Elliott Racing	Ford
98	Jeremy Mayfield	Cale Yarborough Motorsports	Ford
99	Jeff Burton	Roush Racing	Ford

== Qualifying ==
Qualifying was split into two rounds. The first round was held on Friday, July 12, at 5:00 PM EST. Each driver would have one lap to set a time. During the first round, the top 25 drivers in the round would be guaranteed a starting spot in the race. If a driver was not able to guarantee a spot in the first round, they had the option to scrub their time from the first round and try and run a faster lap time in a second round qualifying run, held on Saturday, July 13, at 11:00 AM EST. As with the first round, each driver would have one lap to set a time. For this specific race, positions 26-38 would be decided on time, and depending on who needed it, a select amount of positions were given to cars who had not otherwise qualified but were high enough in owner's points.

Ricky Craven, driving for Larry Hedrick Motorsports, would win the pole, setting a time of 29.439 and an average speed of 129.379 miles per hour (208.215 km/h).

Loy Allen Jr. was the only driver to fail to qualify.

=== Full qualifying results ===
Pos.	#	Driver	Team	Make	Time	Speed
1	41	Ricky Craven	Larry Hedrick Motorsports	Chevrolet	29.439	129.379
2	43	Bobby Hamilton	Petty Enterprises	Pontiac	29.570	128.806
3	18	Bobby Labonte	Joe Gibbs Racing	Chevrolet	29.612	128.624
4	42	Kyle Petty	Team SABCO	Pontiac	29.637	128.515
5	3	Dale Earnhardt	Richard Childress Racing	Chevrolet	29.668	128.381
6	28	Ernie Irvan	Robert Yates Racing	Ford	29.682	128.320
7	7	Geoff Bodine	Geoff Bodine Racing	Ford	29.683	128.316
8	25	Ken Schrader	Hendrick Motorsports	Chevrolet	29.686	128.303
9	90	Dick Trickle	Donlavey Racing	Ford	29.700	128.242
10	88	Dale Jarrett	Robert Yates Racing	Ford	29.705	128.221
11	87	Joe Nemechek	NEMCO Motorsports	Chevrolet	29.712	128.191
12	33	Robert Pressley	Leo Jackson Motorsports	Chevrolet	29.730	128.113
13	8	Hut Stricklin	Stavola Brothers Racing	Ford	29.732	128.104
14	4	Sterling Marlin	Morgan–McClure Motorsports	Chevrolet	29.740	128.070
15	81	Kenny Wallace	FILMAR Racing	Ford	29.753	128.014
16	24	Jeff Gordon	Hendrick Motorsports	Chevrolet	29.759	127.988
17	2	Rusty Wallace	Penske Racing South	Ford	29.777	127.911
18	9	Lake Speed	Melling Racing	Ford	29.779	127.902
19	17	Darrell Waltrip	Darrell Waltrip Motorsports	Chevrolet	29.784	127.881
20	10	Ricky Rudd	Rudd Performance Motorsports	Ford	29.804	127.795
21	16	Ted Musgrave	Roush Racing	Ford	29.819	127.731
22	6	Mark Martin	Roush Racing	Ford	29.848	127.607
23	5	Terry Labonte	Hendrick Motorsports	Chevrolet	29.852	127.589
24	99	Jeff Burton	Roush Racing	Ford	29.951	127.168
25	12	Derrike Cope	Bobby Allison Motorsports	Ford	29.952	127.163
26	11	Brett Bodine	Brett Bodine Racing	Ford	29.983	127.032
27	37	John Andretti	Kranefuss-Haas Racing	Ford	29.984	127.028
28	75	Morgan Shepherd	Butch Mock Motorsports	Ford	30.005	126.939
29	23	Jimmy Spencer	Travis Carter Enterprises	Ford	30.030	126.833
30	22	Ward Burton	Bill Davis Racing	Pontiac	30.057	126.719
31	21	Michael Waltrip	Wood Brothers Racing	Ford	30.124	126.437
32	1	Rick Mast	Precision Products Racing	Pontiac	30.169	126.249
33	77	Bobby Hillin Jr.	Jasper Motorsports	Ford	30.178	126.211
34	71	Dave Marcis	Marcis Auto Racing	Chevrolet	30.204	126.103
35	29	Greg Sacks	Diamond Ridge Motorsports	Chevrolet	30.304	125.686
36	78	Randy MacDonald	Triad Motorsports	Ford	30.352	125.488
37	94	Bill Elliott	Bill Elliott Racing	Ford	30.655	124.247
38	30	Johnny Benson Jr. (R)	Bahari Racing	Pontiac	35.372	107.678
Provisionals
39	98	Jeremy Mayfield	Cale Yarborough Motorsports	Ford	-*	-*
40	15	Wally Dallenbach Jr.	Bud Moore Engineering	Ford	-*	-*
Failed to qualify
41	19	Loy Allen Jr.	TriStar Motorsports	Ford	-*	-*
Official first round qualifying results
Official starting lineup

== Race results ==
Fin	St	#	Driver	Team	Make	Laps	Led	Status	Pts	Winnings
1	6	28	Ernie Irvan	Robert Yates Racing	Ford	300	38	running	180	$112,625
2	10	88	Dale Jarrett	Robert Yates Racing	Ford	300	2	running	175	$59,725
3	20	10	Ricky Rudd	Rudd Performance Motorsports	Ford	300	6	running	170	$49,825
4	24	99	Jeff Burton	Roush Racing	Ford	300	0	running	160	$31,600
5	12	33	Robert Pressley	Leo Jackson Motorsports	Chevrolet	300	48	running	160	$34,825
6	23	5	Terry Labonte	Hendrick Motorsports	Chevrolet	300	54	running	155	$42,733
7	17	2	Rusty Wallace	Penske Racing South	Ford	300	0	running	146	$30,725
8	8	25	Ken Schrader	Hendrick Motorsports	Chevrolet	300	1	running	147	$27,025
9	38	30	Johnny Benson Jr. (R)	Bahari Racing	Pontiac	300	17	running	143	$27,825
10	31	21	Michael Waltrip	Wood Brothers Racing	Ford	300	0	running	134	$30,025
11	21	16	Ted Musgrave	Roush Racing	Ford	300	2	running	135	$26,425
12	5	3	Dale Earnhardt	Richard Childress Racing	Chevrolet	300	12	running	132	$32,225
13	32	1	Rick Mast	Precision Products Racing	Pontiac	299	0	running	124	$26,125
14	37	94	Bill Elliott	Bill Elliott Racing	Ford	299	0	running	121	$28,325
15	7	7	Geoff Bodine	Geoff Bodine Racing	Ford	299	14	running	123	$26,725
16	26	11	Brett Bodine	Brett Bodine Racing	Ford	299	0	running	115	$25,125
17	29	23	Jimmy Spencer	Travis Carter Enterprises	Ford	299	0	running	112	$24,925
18	40	15	Wally Dallenbach Jr.	Bud Moore Engineering	Ford	299	0	running	109	$24,725
19	15	81	Kenny Wallace	FILMAR Racing	Ford	299	0	running	106	$17,525
20	2	43	Bobby Hamilton	Petty Enterprises	Pontiac	299	41	running	108	$28,625
21	33	77	Bobby Hillin Jr.	Jasper Motorsports	Ford	299	0	running	100	$14,000
22	28	75	Morgan Shepherd	Butch Mock Motorsports	Ford	299	0	running	97	$17,000
23	13	8	Hut Stricklin	Stavola Brothers Racing	Ford	299	0	running	94	$16,800
24	18	9	Lake Speed	Melling Racing	Ford	299	0	running	91	$23,700
25	30	22	Ward Burton	Bill Davis Racing	Pontiac	299	0	running	88	$28,800
26	1	41	Ricky Craven	Larry Hedrick Motorsports	Chevrolet	299	1	running	90	$29,500
27	9	90	Dick Trickle	Donlavey Racing	Ford	298	0	running	82	$13,375
28	4	42	Kyle Petty	Team SABCO	Pontiac	297	0	running	79	$20,275
29	14	4	Sterling Marlin	Morgan–McClure Motorsports	Chevrolet	297	0	running	76	$29,775
30	35	29	Greg Sacks	Diamond Ridge Motorsports	Chevrolet	295	0	running	73	$20,075
31	3	18	Bobby Labonte	Joe Gibbs Racing	Chevrolet	289	0	running	70	$30,475
32	36	78	Randy MacDonald	Triad Motorsports	Ford	288	0	running	67	$12,875
33	22	6	Mark Martin	Roush Racing	Ford	284	4	running	69	$29,575
34	16	24	Jeff Gordon	Hendrick Motorsports	Chevrolet	253	59	ignition	71	$35,875
35	11	87	Joe Nemechek	NEMCO Motorsports	Chevrolet	197	0	crash	58	$19,575
36	39	98	Jeremy Mayfield	Cale Yarborough Motorsports	Ford	187	0	crash	55	$12,475
37	19	17	Darrell Waltrip	Darrell Waltrip Motorsports	Chevrolet	159	1	crash	57	$19,375
38	25	12	Derrike Cope	Bobby Allison Motorsports	Ford	68	0	engine	49	$19,125
39	34	71	Dave Marcis	Marcis Auto Racing	Chevrolet	54	0	engine	46	$12,125
40	27	37	John Andretti	Kranefuss-Haas Racing	Ford	26	0	crash	43	$19,125
Official race results

Previous race: 1996 Pepsi 400	NASCAR Winston Cup Series; 1996 season	Next race: 1996 Miller 500 (Pocono)
