= Gil Martin =

NASCAR crew chief

Personal information
- Born: September 17, 1960 (age 66) Nashville, Tennessee, U.S.

Sport
- Country: United States
- Sport: NASCAR Sprint Cup Series
- Team: 29. Richard Childress Racing

Gilford Hicks Martin Jr. (born September 17, 1960) is an American NASCAR crew chief.

== Life ==
He was employed at Richard Childress Racing as the Competition Director of the NASCAR Xfinity Series Shop, formerly the owner of FILMAR Racing and the crew chief for the No. 29 Sprint Cup Series car, driven by Kevin Harvick. At RCR, he was crew chief for Robby Gordon, Clint Bowyer, and Kevin Harvick, winning with all three, and the winningest crew chief at RCR since Kirk Shelmerdine (1980-1992). Taking an early retirement in 2017 to fight CTCL, a rare form of cancer, he returned to racing in 2022 in the TransAm series with a Harvick-associated driver. He is the first NASCAR crew chief to win in all three divisions of the Cup, Nationwide, and Truck Series, and in 2023 got his first win in the TransAm series, winning seven TransAm races that year with driver phenom Connor Zilisch. He has over 20 NASCAR Sprint Cup Series wins (counting non-points races) and is one of the most successful crew chiefs in NASCAR over all three series.

He is married to wife Ronda and has one son, Ford Martin.
