= Sam Bass (artist) =

American motorsports artist (1961–2019)

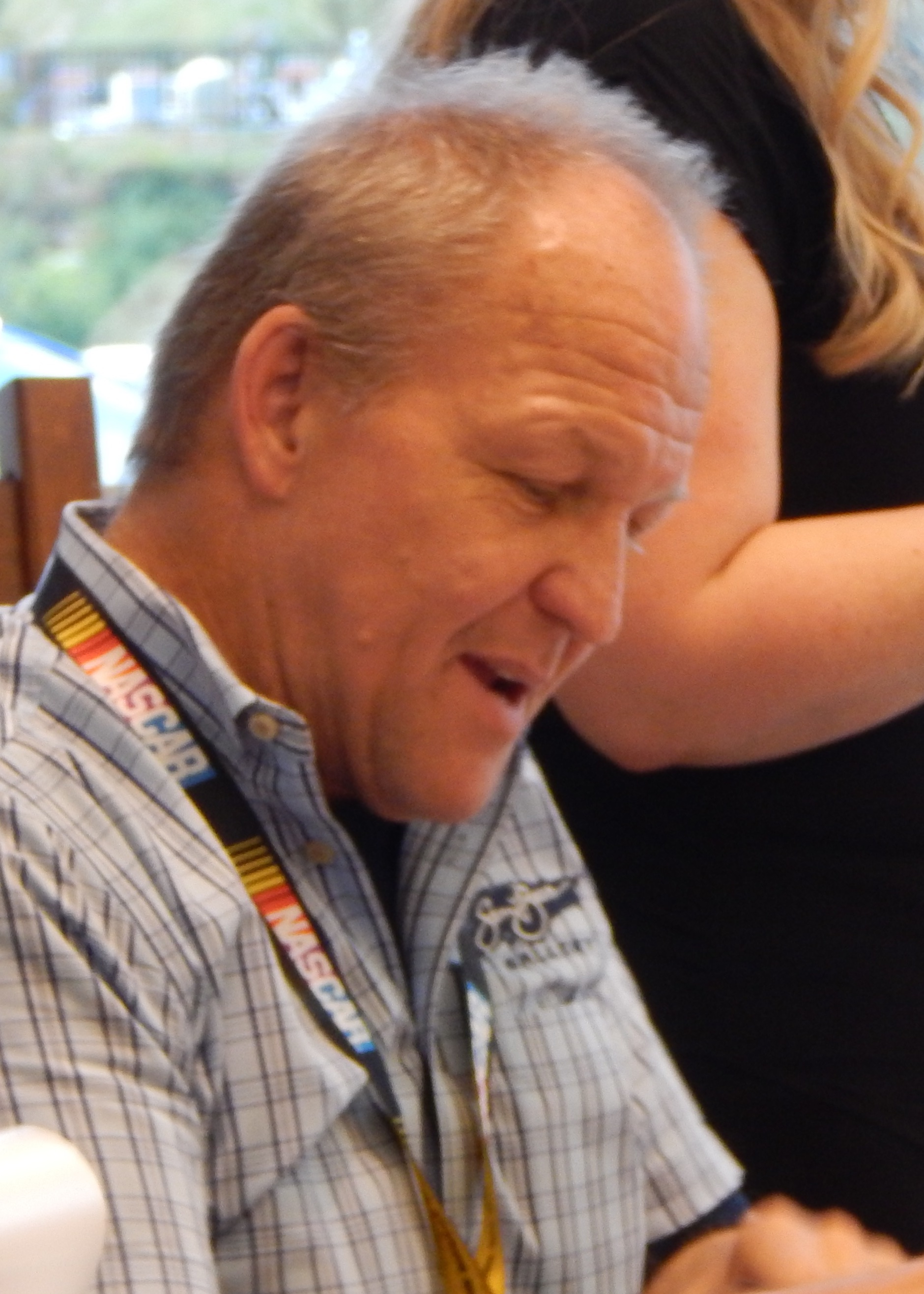
- Bass signing race day posters he designed for the 2015 Irwin Tools Night Race
- Born: Samuel Mark Bass; November 20, 1961; Hopewell, Virginia, U.S.
- Died: February 16, 2019 (aged 57); Concord, North Carolina, U.S.
- Education: Virginia Commonwealth University
- Occupation: Artist

Samuel Mark Bass (November 20, 1961 – February 16, 2019) was an American motorsports artist known for being NASCAR's first officially licensed artist. A lifelong NASCAR fan, he began working on designing drivers' cars paint schemes with Bobby Allison in 1988. He later designed various paint schemes for drivers like Jeff Gordon and Dale Earnhardt, and designed and painted dozens of Race program covers for races at Charlotte Motor Speedway, Bristol Motor Speedway, and others.

== Early life ==
Bass started following racing when he was young, attending races at Southside Speedway in Richmond, Virginia with his uncles. Eventually, he began drawing pictures of the sport; during NASCAR's offseason, he drew what he believed the upcoming Daytona 500's cars would look like; "Then, when the Daytona broadcast would come on TV, I would be like, 'Oh, so that's how it looks.'," Bass said in 1999.

At 20, he worked for the government as a graphic designer. He graduated from Virginia Commonwealth University with a fine arts degree.

== Career ==
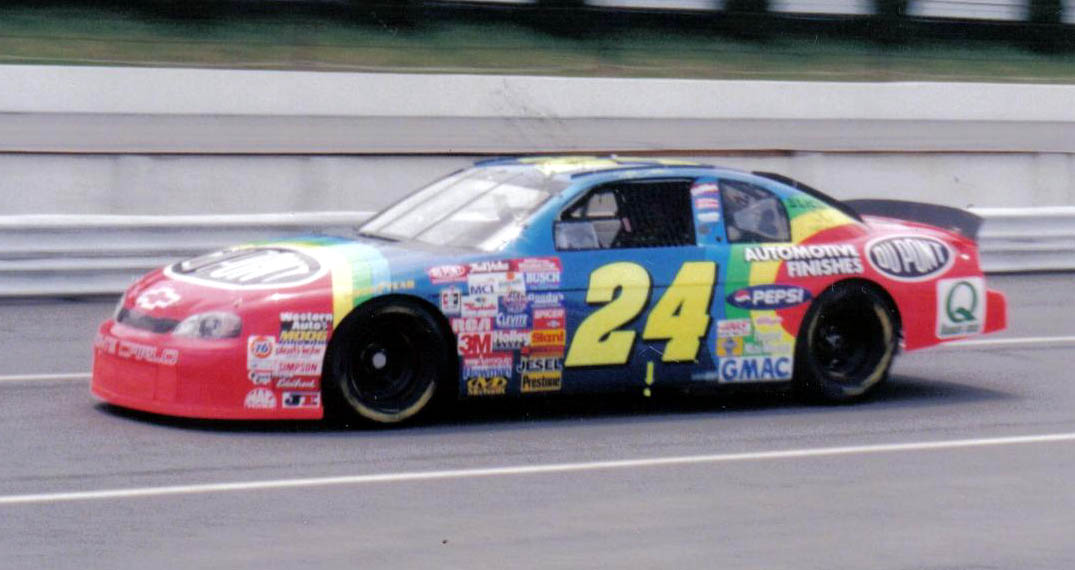
Jeff Gordon's "Rainbow Warrior" paint scheme is considered one of Bass' most well-known works.

A year after graduating high school, Bass joined a friend at the 1981 Talladega 500 with the goal of getting his Bobby Allison painting autographed. At the track, he convinced security to let him access the garages, where he successfully had his painting signed by Allison and his crew. The art also impressed the teams of Darrell Waltrip and Terry Labonte, who requested paintings of their drivers.

In 1984, he was hired by Charlotte Motor Speedway to design programs for the track's races starting with that year's World 600. His studio Sam Bass Illustration and Design opened in 1991, located near the track's turn one.

He was later commissioned by Allison's merchandise team member Hank Jones to create a poster of Allison to sell, followed by doing the same for fellow Miller Brewing Company-sponsored driver Bobby Hillin Jr. In late 1987, Miller requested him to design their entire motorsport schemes for the 1988 season. Allison went on to win the Daytona 500 in his first race in a Bass-drawn car, and Danny Sullivan won the CART PPG Cup. In 1989, the Miller-sponsored Jim Busby prototype, which also was a Bass-drawn car, won the SunBank 24.

In 1997, Bass was named NASCAR's first officially licensed artist.

Bass was the designer for four-time NASCAR Cup Series champion Jeff Gordon's No. 24 cars throughout his Cup career. The partnership started in 1991, before Gordon made his Cup debut, when crew chief Ray Evernham purchased one of Bass' prints as a birthday present for Gordon; instead of requiring money for the drawing, Bass asked if he could design Gordon's car. As sponsor DuPont sold automotive paint, Bass based his design on the company's many available colors, leading to a rainbow scheme that was ultimately accepted from a group of 43 entries; the livery, nicknamed the "Rainbow Warrior", became one of NASCAR's most iconic cars during the 1990s. In 2001, Bass created a blue base, red flames scheme for Gordon that was driven to the 2001 NASCAR Winston Cup Series championship; while the colors varied in later races, Gordon continued to drive flames DuPont/Axalta Coating Systems-sponsored cars until his retirement in 2015.

Other drivers who raced with schemes drawn by Bass include Dale Earnhardt, Tony Stewart, and Hendrick Motorsports' Nos. 24 and 88 teams.

Bass also designed the cars and uniforms for the movie Talladega Nights: The Ballad of Ricky Bobby. He was also the logo designer for the minor league baseball team Kannapolis Intimidators.

== Personal life and death ==
Bass' widow Denise is a paralegal. The two were friends in sixth grade prior to starting their relationship, eventually marrying in the early 1980s.

During the later years of his life, Bass struggled with health issues including diabetes mellitus type 1 and kidney disease; the former was diagnosed when he was 29, while the latter stemmed from sepsis he received due to a blister in his left foot in 2005 that resulted in below-the-knee amputation three years later. In 2014, he was nearly killed by septic shock after suffering a diabetic blood inflection. In 2017, Sam Bass Illustration and Design declared bankruptcy as his financial and health struggles mounted.

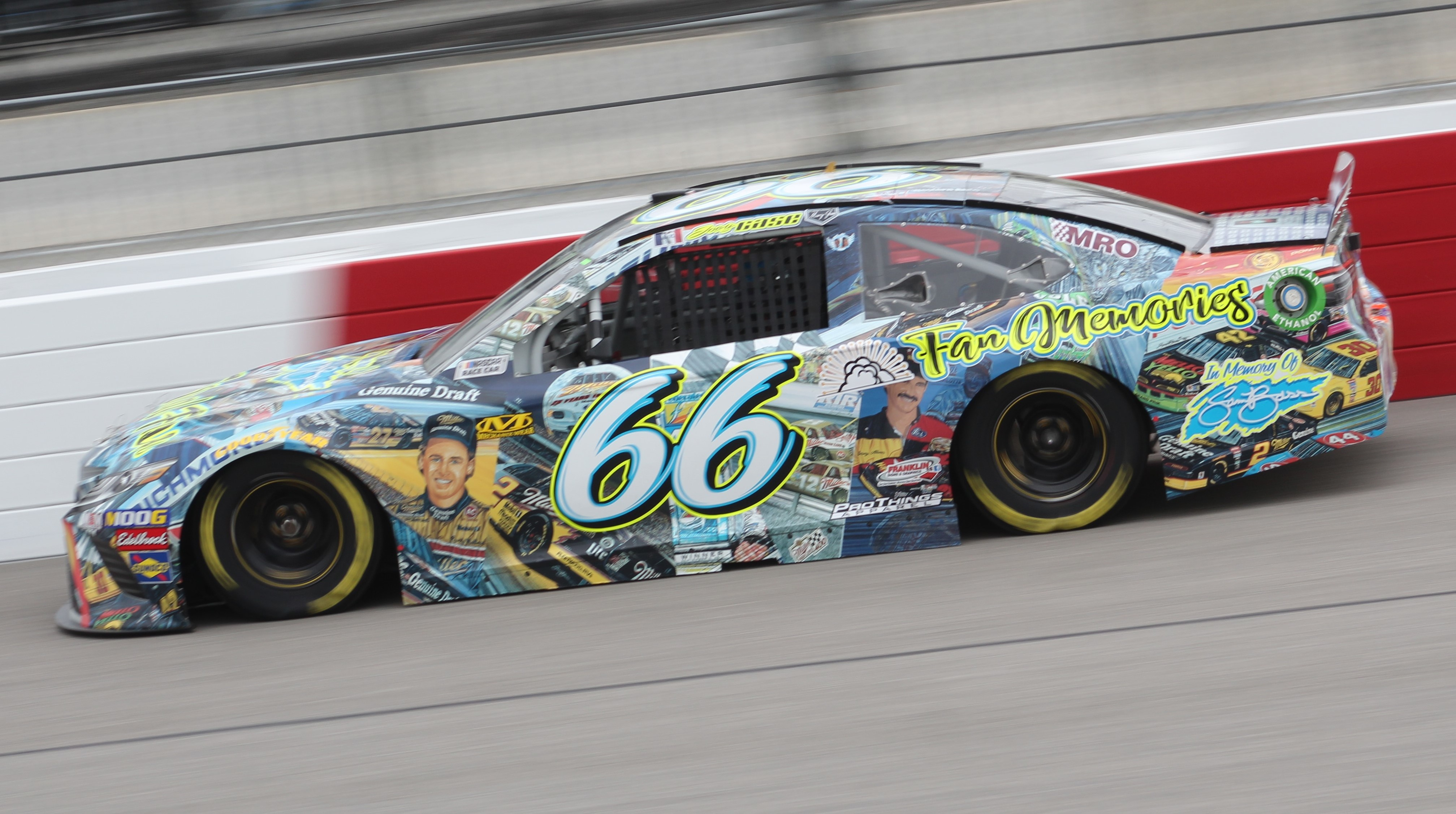
Joey Gase running a special paint scheme honoring Bass at Richmond, April 2019.

Bass died on February 16, 2019, at the age of 57, of a kidney disease. In April's Toyota Owners 400 at Richmond Raceway, Joey Gase and MBM Motorsports ran a tribute scheme to Bass on their No. 66 car.
