= FILMAR Racing =

Former NASCAR team

FILMAR Racing/Davis & Weight Motorsports
- Owner(s): Fil Martocci, Gil Martin, Jerry Davis, Anthony Weight
- Base: North Carolina
- Series: Winston Cup, Busch Series
- Race drivers: David Green, Jeff Burton
- Manufacturer: Ford, Oldsmobile
- Opened: 1989
- Closed: 2003

Career
- Drivers' Championships: 0
- Race victories: 9

FILMAR Racing is a former NASCAR Winston Cup and Busch Series team. It was owned by Fil Martocci and crew chief Gil Martin. The team was sold in 1999 to the Pinnacle Motorsports Group and then to Davis & Weight Motorsports.

== Beginnings ==
FILMAR began racing in 1989 when they fielded the No. 8 Oldsmobile driven by Bobby Hamilton in the Busch series, winning in September at Richmond. Originally unsponsored, they picked up sponsorship from TIC Financial Industries in June 1990, starting at Orange County Speedway. Hamilton had seven top-fives and finished eleventh in points, but departed for the Winston Cup series and was replaced by David Green. Despite missing a pair of races early in the season, Green won the pole for the season-opening Goody's 300 and won at Lanier Raceway. He finished thirteenth in points and finished runner-up to Jeff Gordon for Rookie of the Year honors. At the end of the season, Green was replaced by Jeff Burton. Burton had four top-fives, including a win at New Hampshire International Speedway, and finished ninth in points.

In 1993, Baby Ruth became the team's sponsor as they switched to Ford, and despite winning at Myrtle Beach Speedway, Burton and the team dropped to fourteenth in points. The team also made its Cup debut that year with Burton at New Hampshire, starting 6th but finishing 37th after their No. 0 Ford wrecked in a lap 3 incident.

== Kenny Wallace years ==
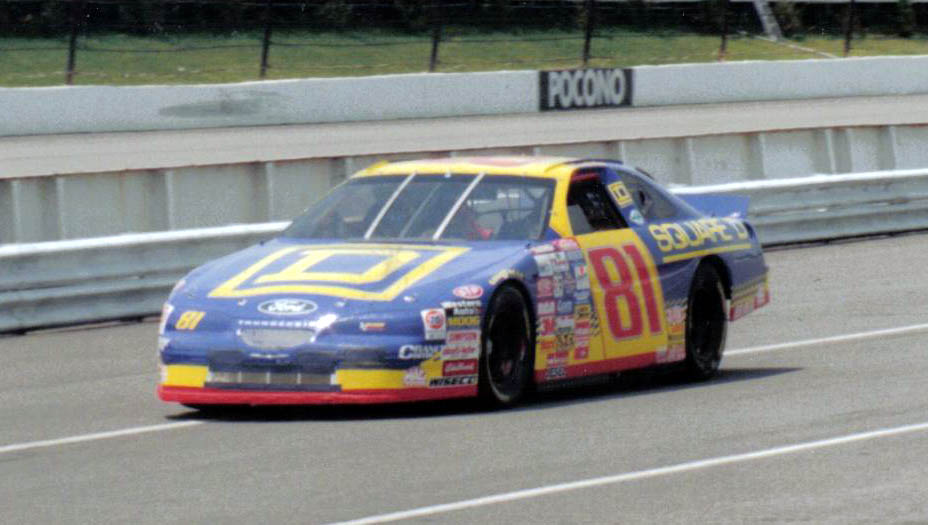
The 81 car from 1996-1997.

After Burton left to run for Stavola Brothers Racing's Cup program, Kenny Wallace was hired as the team's new driver for 1994. Wallace won a pole at Nazareth Speedway and won at Bristol, Martinsville, and Richmond late in the year and finished fourth in points. They also ran a Cup race at Michigan, finishing nineteenth in the No. 81 car.

In 1995, FILMAR and Wallace split time between the Cup and Busch Series. In Cup, the team ran 11 races, finishing in the top-30 three times. In Busch, the team ran fifteen races with sponsorship from Red Dog and won at Richmond and finished 27th in points. In addition to winning again at Richmond in 1996, the team moved up to the Cup series full-time with sponsorship from Square D. Wallace had a seventh-place finish at North Carolina Speedway and finished 28th in points. The following season, FILMAR ran its last Busch race at Richmond as the No. 12 Graybar Ford, starting 27th and finishing 26th. That year, Wallace won his first two career poles in Cup at Martinsville and Bristol. Despite two top-tens, Wallace and the team dropped to 33rd in the standings.

In 1998, Wallace posted seven top-tens but failed to qualify twice, finishing 31st in points.

== Davis & Weight ==
Towards the end of 1998, Wallace announced he and Square D would be departing FILMAR and join Andy Petree Racing. After rumors spread that Todd Bodine or Willy T. Ribbs would be the team's new driver for 1999, Marcotti sold the team to an organization called the Pinnacle Motorsports Group. The team planned to run that year's Daytona 500 with Morgan Shepherd driving, but failed to qualify. The group was sold again to Davis & Weight Motorsports late in the season. The team made its Busch debut at the Food City 250 with Brandon Sperling driving the No. 55 Pontiac Grand Prix with sponsorship from the University of Florida. He started and finished 27th. Michael Ritch ran a pair of races for D&W that year, at Rockingham and Memphis Motorsports Park, his best finish a 35th.

D&W hired Ritch to compete full-time in the Busch Series in 2000 competing for Rookie of the Year honors. In addition, they announced they would run the No. 81 in Cup in five races that season to move up full-time in 2001. Ritch made 21 starts that season and had five top-twenty finishes in the UoF/Kleenex Ford Taurus, and finished 33rd in points, but the team did not attempt any Cup races. In 2001, Mark Green took over, and had a best finish of sixteenth at Darlington Raceway when the team announced it was closing its Busch program to focus on Cup. After announcing they would attempt the Brickyard 400, the team laid off all of its employees and did not attempt a race again.

== Motorsports results ==
=== Winston Cup ===
==== Car No. 81 results ====
Year	Driver	No.	Make	1	2	3	4	5	6	7	8	9	10	11	12	13	14	15	16	17	18	19	20	21	22	23	24	25	26	27	28	29	30	31	32	33	34	Owners	Pts
1993	Jeff Burton	0	Ford	DAY	CAR	RCH	ATL	DAR	BRI	NWS	MAR	TAL	SON	CLT	DOV	POC	MCH	DAY	NHA; 37	POC	TAL	GLN	MCH	BRI	DAR	RCH	DOV	MAR	NWS	CLT	CAR	PHO	ATL						52
1994	Kenny Wallace	81	Ford	DAY	CAR	RCH	ATL	DAR	BRI	NWS	MAR	TAL	SON	CLT	DOV	POC	MCH; 19	DAY	NHA	POC	TAL	IND	GLN	MCH	BRI	DAR	RCH	DOV	MAR	NWS	CLT	CAR	PHO	ATL					106
1995	Kenny Wallace	81	Ford	DAY; DNQ	CAR; 20	RCH; DNQ	ATL; DNQ	DAR; DNQ	BRI	NWS; DNQ	MAR; 21	TAL; 36	SON	CLT; 31	DOV; 18	POC	MCH; 36	DAY; DNQ	NHA	POC; 37	TAL	IND; 36	GLN	MCH; 24	BRI; DNQ	DAR	RCH; 20	DOV	MAR; DNQ	NWS	CLT; DNQ	CAR	PHO; 26	ATL					878
1996	Kenny Wallace	81	Ford	DAY; 21	CAR; 7	RCH; 15	ATL; 37	DAR; 17	BRI; 34	NWS; 18	MAR; 14	TAL; 14	SON; 27	CLT; 32	DOV; 20	POC; 37	MCH; 33	DAY; 38	NHA; 19	POC; 36	TAL; 20	IND; 33	GLN; 31	MCH; 37	BRI; 15	DAR; 13	RCH; 38	DOV; 20	MAR; 10	NWS; 15	CLT; 30	CAR; 19	PHO; 37	ATL; DNQ				28th	2694
1997	Kenny Wallace	81	Ford	DAY; 22	CAR; 41	RCH; 40	ATL; 29	DAR; 14	TEX; 13	BRI; 41	MAR; 6	SON; 36	TAL; 26	CLT; 39	DOV; 27	POC; 34	MCH; 43	CAL; DNQ	DAY; 11	NHA; 19	POC; 34	IND; 30	GLN; 27	MCH; 32	BRI; 39	DAR; 24	RCH; 24	NHA; 27	DOV; 38	MAR; 6	CLT; 28	TAL; 15	CAR; 37	PHO; 35	ATL; 30			33rd	2496
1998	Kenny Wallace	81	Ford	DAY; DNQ	CAR; 38	LVS; 42	ATL; 7	DAR; 9	BRI; 42	TEX; 34	MAR; 22	TAL; 7	CAL; 19	CLT; 25	DOV; 40	RCH; 23	MCH; 39	POC; 39	SON; 22	NHA; 10	POC; 35	IND; 43	GLN; 26	MCH; DNQ	BRI; 42	NHA; 6	DAR; 10	RCH; 11	DOV; 43	MAR; 43	CLT; 16	TAL; 40	DAY; 35	PHO; 8	CAR; 16	ATL; 34		32nd	2656
1999	Morgan Shepherd	81	Ford	DAY; DNQ	CAR	LVS	ATL	DAR	TEX	BRI	MAR	TAL	CAL	RCH	CLT	DOV	MCH	POC	SON	DAY	NHA	POC	IND	GLN	MCH	BRI	DAR	RCH	NHA	DOV	MAR	CLT	TAL	CAR	PHO	HOM	ATL	79th	1

=== Busch Series ===
==== Car No. 8 results (FILMAR era) ====
Year	Driver	No.	Make	1	2	3	4	5	6	7	8	9	10	11	12	13	14	15	16	17	18	19	20	21	22	23	24	25	26	27	28	29	30	31	Owners	Pts
1989	Bobby Hamilton	8	Buick	DAY; 19	CAR	MAR; 28	HCY; 23	DAR; 24	BRI; 24	NZH; 20	SBO; 14	LAN; 24	NSV; 2	CLT; 21	DOV; 29	ROU; 19	LVL; 20	VOL; 16	MYB; 3	SBO; 16	HCY; 24	DUB; 6	IRP; 17	ROU; 23		DAR; 27										
1989	Bobby Hamilton	8	Olds																						BRI; 24		RCH; 1	DOV; 24	MAR; 22	CLT; 17	CAR; 3	MAR; 8				
1990	Bobby Hamilton	8	Olds	DAY; 11	RCH; 9	CAR; 35	MAR; 5	HCY; 26	DAR; 12	BRI; 11	LAN; 4	SBO; 7	NZH; 8	HCY; 6	CLT; 36	DOV; 25	ROU; 4	VOL; 3	MYB; 23	OXF; 27	NHA; 38	SBO; 3	DUB; 20	IRP; 29	ROU; 6	BRI; 7	DAR; 21	RCH; 14	DOV; 5	MAR; 24	CLT; 5	NHA; 42	CAR; 34	MAR; 8		
1991	David Green	8	Olds	DAY; 30	RCH; DNQ	CAR; 13	MAR; DNQ	VOL; 5	HCY; DNQ	DAR; 23	BRI; 2	LAN; 1*	SBO; 17	NZH; 4	CLT; 37	DOV; 14	ROU; 3	HCY; 14	MYB; 9	GLN; 10	OXF; 17	NHA; 8	SBO; 12	DUB; 4	IRP; 23	ROU; 12	BRI; 13	DAR; 30	RCH; 26	DOV; 11	CLT; 27	NHA; 29	CAR; 22	MAR; 25		
1992	Jeff Burton	8	Olds	DAY; 20	CAR; 19	RCH; 31	ATL; 26	MAR; 23	DAR; 15	BRI; 14	HCY; 14	LAN; 7	DUB; 26	NZH; 27	CLT; 14	DOV; 2	ROU; 10	MYB; 22	GLN; 9	VOL; 22	NHA; 1	TAL; 20	IRP; 11	ROU; 5	MCH; 34	NHA; 8	BRI; 3	DAR; 17	RCH; 6		CLT; 34	MAR; 6	CAR; 23	HCY; 18		
1992	Jeff Burton	8	Ford																											DOV; 18						
1993	Jeff Burton	8	Ford	DAY; 6	CAR; 31	RCH; 3	DAR; 39	BRI; 7	HCY; 20	ROU; 8	MAR; 7	NZH; 28	CLT; 9	DOV; 3	MYB; 1*	GLN; 33	MLW; 6*	TAL; 21	IRP; 8	MCH; 27	NHA; 24	BRI; 33	DAR; 24	RCH; 35	DOV; 11	ROU; 26	CLT; 18	MAR; 22	CAR; 22	HCY; 23	ATL; 39					
1994	Kenny Wallace	8	Ford	DAY; 8	CAR; 23	RCH; 2	ATL; 21	MAR; 3	DAR; 4	HCY; 27	BRI; 20	ROU; 3*	NHA; 4	NZH; 8	CLT; 43	DOV; 38	MYB; 2	GLN; 25	MLW; 5	SBO; 23*	TAL; 24	HCY; 2	IRP; 8	MCH; 34	BRI; 1*	DAR; 21	RCH; 1*	DOV; 18	CLT; 15	MAR; 1	CAR; 6					
1995	Kenny Wallace	8	Ford	DAY; 4	CAR	RCH; 1*	ATL; 18	NSV; 4	DAR	BRI; 4	HCY	NHA	NZH	CLT; 40	DOV	MYB	GLN	MLW; 11	TAL; 3	SBO	IRP	MCH; 26	BRI; 30	DAR; 14	RCH; 8	DOV	CLT; 10	CAR; 42	HOM; 16*							
1996	Kenny Wallace	8	Ford	DAY; DNQ	CAR	RCH	ATL	NSV; 28*	DAR	BRI; 3	HCY	NZH	CLT; DNQ	DOV; 13	SBO	MYB	GLN; 9	MLW; 4	NHA; 30	TAL; 37	IRP	MCH; 22	BRI	DAR	RCH; 1*	DOV	CLT	CAR	HOM; 14							
1997	Kenny Wallace	12	Ford	DAY	CAR	RCH	ATL	LVS	DAR	HCY	TEX	BRI	NSV	TAL	NHA	NZH	CLT	DOV	SBO	GLN	MLW	MYB	GTY; DNQ	IRP	MCH	BRI	DAR	RCH; 26	DOV	CLT	CAL	CAR	HOM		76th	119

==== Car No. 55 results (Davis & Weight era) ====
Year	Driver	No.	Make	1	2	3	4	5	6	7	8	9	10	11	12	13	14	15	16	17	18	19	20	21	22	23	24	25	26	27	28	29	30	31	32	33	Owners	Pts
1999	Brandon Sperling	55	Pontiac	DAY	CAR	LVS	ATL	DAR	TEX	NSV	BRI	TAL	CAL	NHA	RCH	NZH	CLT	DOV	SBO	GLN	MLW	MYB	PPR	GTY	IRP	MCH	BRI; 27										81st	149
1999	Ed Berrier	55	Pontiac																									DAR; DNQ									81st	149
1999	Michael Ritch	55	Pontiac																										RCH; DNQ	DOV; DNQ	CLT	CAR; 35	MEM; 37	PHO	HOM		81st	149
2000	Michael Ritch	55	Ford	DAY; DNQ	CAR; 16	LVS; 39	ATL; DNQ	DAR; 39	BRI; DNQ	TEX; DNQ	NSV; 39	TAL; 13	CAL; DNQ	RCH; 42	NHA; 22	CLT; DNQ	DOV; 15	SBO; 25	MYB; 24	GLN; DNQ	MLW; 16	NZH; 43	PPR; 32	GTY; 22	IRP; 20	MCH; DNQ	BRI; 25	DAR; 42	RCH; DNQ	DOV; 23	CLT; DNQ	CAR; 21	MEM; 42	PHO; 35	HOM; DNQ		37th	1828
2001	Mark Green	55	Ford	DAY; 20	CAR; 20	LVS; 32	ATL; 41	DAR; 16	BRI; 40	TEX; 41	NSH; 21	TAL; 17	CAL	RCH	NHA	NZH	CLT	DOV	KEN; 16	MLW	GLN	CHI	GTY	PPR	IRP	MCH	BRI	DAR	RCH	DOV	KAN	CLT	MEM	PHO	CAR	HOM	46th	838
