= Michael Kranefuss =

American businessman

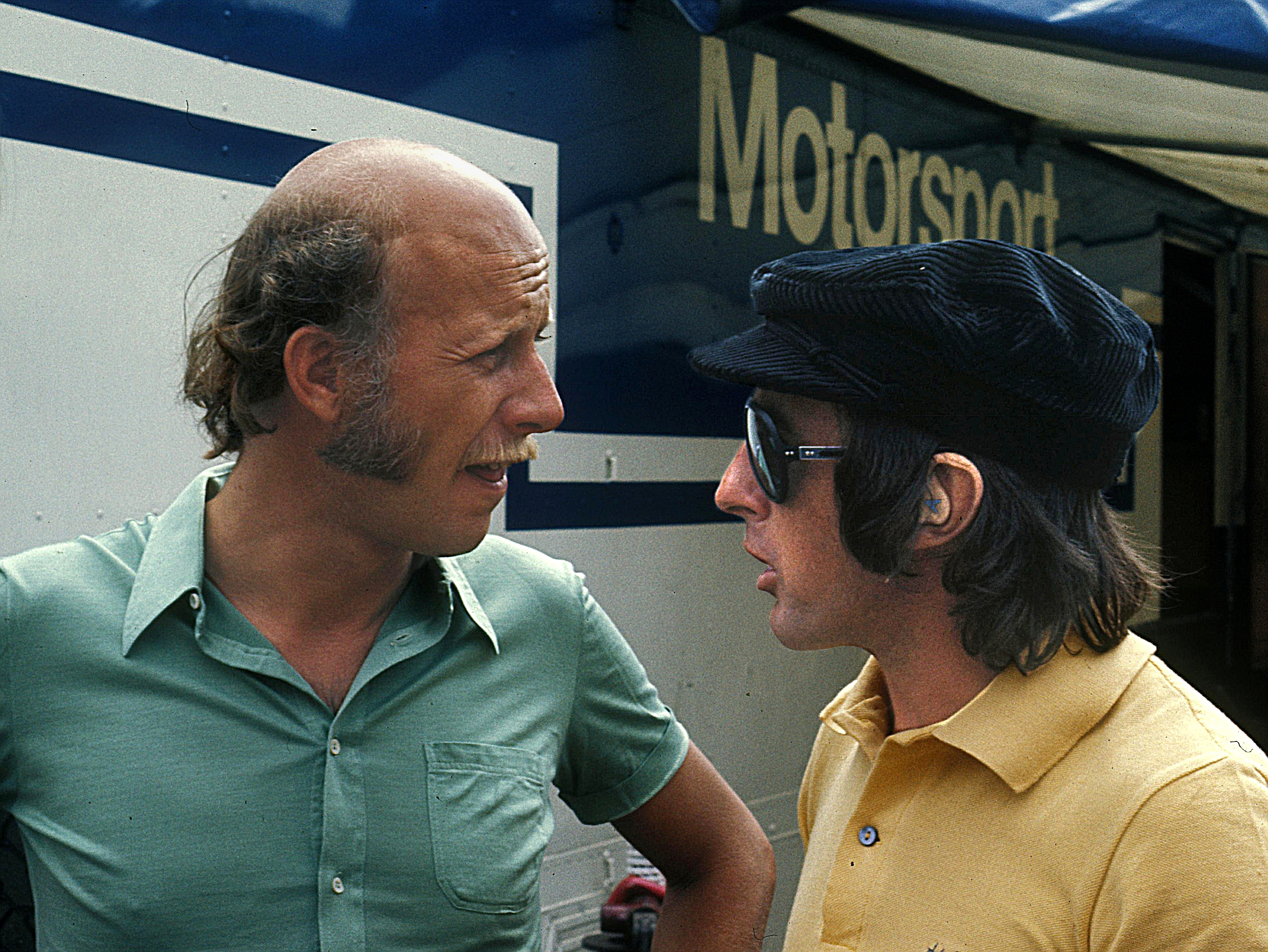
Kranefuss (left) in conversation with Jackie Stewart in 1973

Michael "Mike" Kranefuss (born July 3, 1938) is a German-born American former head of Ford Motor Company's International Motorsports division for 12 years. After leaving Ford, he became a NASCAR team owner.

== Ford Motor Company ==
Kranefuss led Ford Motor Company's worldwide racing efforts from 1980 to 1993 as their Director of Special Vehicle Operations. At that time, Ford was the only manufacturer to be involved in World Rally Cars, NASCAR, Formula One, and Champ Car. Kranefuss began working for Ford in 1968 as an assistant for Ford's German Competition Department. He became Ford's German manager in 1972 when he developed on the Ford Capri. The Capri won two European Touring Car Championships and he became Ford's European head in 1976. Ford joined the World Rally Championship and won the 1979 championship with a Ford Escort. When he started, he resurrected Ford racing from a single IMSA sports car.

== NASCAR career ==
With NASCAR's high levels of popularity in the 1990s, Kranefuss and Carl Haas formed Kranefuss-Haas Racing. The team debuted in 1994 at Michigan International Speedway with driver Robby Gordon finishing 38th. Geoff Brabham drove for the team in the inaugural Brickyard 400 that year as well. Kranefuss's original full-time NASCAR driver was John Andretti, who drove the #37 Ford for the team in 1995 and most of 1996. In late 1996 Kranefuss's team and Cale Yarborough's team essentially swapped drivers as Jeremy Mayfield took over driving the #37 and Andretti started driving for Yarborough's #98 team. For 1998, Kranefuss merged his team with Penske Racing and the team changed their car number to #12 to more closely match Penske's flagship #2 car. Late in the 2001 season, Jeremy Mayfield was fired with eight rounds remaining in the year. Mike Wallace, Rusty's younger brother, was brought in to finish the season in the #12 car. At the end of the year, Penske bought out Kranefuss's interest in the #12 team and put Ryan Newman in the #12 car full-time for 2002. As an owner, Kranefuss won three victories – all under the Penske-Kranefuss banner and with Mayfield driving.

=== Car No. 12 history ===
The first No. 12 team for Penske was not always owned by the team. Originally the car was owned by Kranefuss. The team debuted in 1994 at Michigan as the #07 Ford driven by Robby Gordon. The car started and finished 38th after Gordon crashed on lap 70. After another start with Geoff Brabham at the Brickyard 400, the team went full-time in 1995 with John Andretti, a second-year driver. The car became #37 and was sponsored by Kmart and Little Caesars. Andretti won the pole at the Mountain Dew Southern 500 and finished 18th in the points. The team struggled in 1996. Before the season ended, Kranefuss decided change was needed, and replaced Andretti with the relatively unknown Jeremy Mayfield.

The team improved to be 13th in the points in 1997, but it was possible that the team would not succeed if it only fielded one team. In 1998, Kranefuss announced his team would merge with Penske Racing, and would also change to the #12 with Mobil Oil sponsoring the car. The move turned out to be a success, and Mayfield gained noteriety. He won the pole at Texas, and at one point in the season, found himself in the points lead. At the Pocono 500 in June, he won his first Winston Cup series race. Mayfield's breakout year in Winston Cup ended with a 7th-place finish in the points. Mayfield struggled in 1999, as he did not win and dropped 4 spots in the points. In 2000, he won the Pocono 500 and California 500. Midway through the season, Kranefuss sold his share of the team to Penske. Mayfield then suffered a concussion while practicing for the Brickyard 400. He missed two races recuperating from his injury and finished 24th in points. Following 2000, Kranefuss was no longer associated with the Penske No. 12; he fielded a No. 84 Ford for Shawna Robinson in 2001, but only qualified for one of four events attempted, at Michigan.

Later, Kranefuss founded Falcon Cars with Ken Anderson in 2002, with the plan of entering a chassis into the IndyCar Series in 2003. However, the car never ran and the company quickly folded.
