= 1994 Miller Genuine Draft 400 (Richmond) =

24th race of the 1994 NASCAR Winston Cup Series

Race details
- Race 24 of 31 in the 1994 NASCAR Winston Cup Series
- The 1994 Miller Genuine Draft 400 program cover, featuring Rusty Wallace. Artwork by NASCAR artist Sam Bass.
- Date: September 10, 1994
- Official name: 37th Annual Miller Genuine Draft 400
- Location: Richmond, Virginia, Richmond International Raceway
- Course: Permanent racing facility
- Course length: 0.75 miles (1.21 km)
- Distance: 400 laps, 300 mi (482.803 km)
- Scheduled distance: 400 laps, 300 mi (482.803 km)
- Average speed: 104.156 miles per hour (167.623 km/h)

Pole position
Driver	Ted Musgrave	Roush Racing
- Time: 21.765

Most laps led
Driver	Terry Labonte	Hendrick Motorsports
- Laps: 237

Winner
No. 5	Terry Labonte	Hendrick Motorsports

Television in the United States
- Network: TBS
- Announcers: Ken Squier, Chuck Bown

Radio in the United States
- Radio: Motor Racing Network

The 1994 Miller Genuine Draft 400 was the 24th stock car race of the 1994 NASCAR Winston Cup Series season and the 37th iteration of the event. The race was held on Saturday, September 10, 1994, in Richmond, Virginia, at Richmond International Raceway, a 0.75 miles (1.21 km) D-shaped oval. The race took the scheduled 400 laps to complete. On lap 373 of the race, Hendrick Motorsports driver Terry Labonte would make a late-race pass for the lead and hold the field off to take his 13th career NASCAR Winston Cup Series victory and his second victory of the season. To fill out the top three, Richard Childress Racing driver Dale Earnhardt and owner-driver Darrell Waltrip would finish second and third, respectively.

== Background ==
The layout of Richmond International Raceway, the venue where the race was at.

Richmond International Raceway (RIR) is a 3/4-mile (1.2 km), D-shaped, asphalt race track located just outside Richmond, Virginia in Henrico County. It Known as "America's premier short track".

=== Entry list ===
- (R) denotes rookie driver.

#	Driver	Team	Make
1	Rick Mast	Precision Products Racing	Ford
01	Billy Ogle Jr.	Ogle Racing	Chevrolet
2	Rusty Wallace	Penske Racing South	Ford
3	Dale Earnhardt	Richard Childress Racing	Chevrolet
4	Sterling Marlin	Morgan–McClure Motorsports	Chevrolet
5	Terry Labonte	Hendrick Motorsports	Chevrolet
6	Mark Martin	Roush Racing	Ford
7	Geoff Bodine	Geoff Bodine Racing	Ford
8	Jeff Burton (R)	Stavola Brothers Racing	Ford
9	Phil Parsons	Melling Racing	Ford
10	Ricky Rudd	Rudd Performance Motorsports	Ford
11	Bill Elliott	Junior Johnson & Associates	Ford
12	Derrike Cope	Bobby Allison Motorsports	Ford
15	Lake Speed	Bud Moore Engineering	Ford
16	Ted Musgrave	Roush Racing	Ford
17	Darrell Waltrip	Darrell Waltrip Motorsports	Chevrolet
18	Dale Jarrett	Joe Gibbs Racing	Chevrolet
19	Loy Allen Jr. (R)	TriStar Motorsports	Ford
21	Morgan Shepherd	Wood Brothers Racing	Ford
22	Bobby Labonte	Bill Davis Racing	Pontiac
23	Hut Stricklin	Travis Carter Enterprises	Ford
24	Jeff Gordon	Hendrick Motorsports	Chevrolet
25	Ken Schrader	Hendrick Motorsports	Chevrolet
26	Brett Bodine	King Racing	Ford
27	Jimmy Spencer	Junior Johnson & Associates	Ford
28	Kenny Wallace	Robert Yates Racing	Ford
29	Steve Grissom	Diamond Ridge Motorsports	Chevrolet
30	Michael Waltrip	Bahari Racing	Pontiac
31	Ward Burton	A.G. Dillard Motorsports	Chevrolet
32	Dick Trickle	Active Motorsports	Chevrolet
33	Harry Gant	Leo Jackson Motorsports	Chevrolet
40	Bobby Hamilton	SABCO Racing	Pontiac
41	Joe Nemechek (R)	Larry Hedrick Motorsports	Chevrolet
42	Kyle Petty	SABCO Racing	Pontiac
43	John Andretti (R)	Petty Enterprises	Pontiac
47	Billy Standridge (R)	Johnson Standridge Racing	Ford
51	Dirk Stephens	Whitcomb Racing	Ford
52	Brad Teague	Jimmy Means Racing	Ford
71	Dave Marcis	Marcis Auto Racing	Chevrolet
75	Todd Bodine	Butch Mock Motorsports	Ford
77	Greg Sacks	U.S. Motorsports Inc.	Ford
80	Joe Ruttman	Hover Motorsports	Ford
90	Mike Wallace (R)	Donlavey Racing	Ford
95	Jeff Green	Sadler Brothers Racing	Ford
98	Jeremy Mayfield (R)	Cale Yarborough Motorsports	Ford

== Qualifying ==
Qualifying was split into two rounds. The first round was held on Friday, September 9, at 5:30 PM EST. Each driver would have one lap to set a time. During the first round, the top 20 drivers in the round would be guaranteed a starting spot in the race. If a driver was not able to guarantee a spot in the first round, they had the option to scrub their time from the first round and try and run a faster lap time in a second round qualifying run, held on Saturday, September 10, at 2:00 PM EST. As with the first round, each driver would have one lap to set a time. For this specific race, positions 21-36 would be decided on time, and depending on who needed it, a select amount of positions were given to cars who had not otherwise qualified but were high enough in owner's points; up to two provisionals were given. If needed, a past champion who did not qualify on either time or provisionals could use a champion's provisional, adding one more spot to the field.

Ted Musgrave, driving for Roush Racing, won the pole, setting a time of 21.765 and an average speed of 124.052 mph (199.642 km/h) in the first round.

Seven drivers would fail to qualify.

=== Full qualifying results ===
Pos.	#	Driver	Team	Make	Time	Speed
1	16	Ted Musgrave	Roush Racing	Ford	21.765	124.052
2	23	Hut Stricklin	Travis Carter Enterprises	Ford	21.808	123.808
3	5	Terry Labonte	Hendrick Motorsports	Chevrolet	21.820	123.740
4	22	Bobby Labonte	Bill Davis Racing	Pontiac	21.827	123.700
5	2	Rusty Wallace	Penske Racing South	Ford	21.836	123.649
6	77	Greg Sacks	U.S. Motorsports Inc.	Ford	21.844	123.604
7	40	Bobby Hamilton	SABCO Racing	Pontiac	21.845	123.598
8	29	Steve Grissom (R)	Diamond Ridge Motorsports	Chevrolet	21.860	123.513
9	7	Geoff Bodine	Geoff Bodine Racing	Ford	21.891	123.338
10	25	Ken Schrader	Hendrick Motorsports	Chevrolet	21.898	123.299
11	1	Rick Mast	Precision Products Racing	Ford	21.902	123.276
12	3	Dale Earnhardt	Richard Childress Racing	Chevrolet	21.907	123.248
13	24	Jeff Gordon	Hendrick Motorsports	Chevrolet	21.909	123.237
14	6	Mark Martin	Roush Racing	Ford	21.914	123.209
15	31	Ward Burton (R)	A.G. Dillard Motorsports	Chevrolet	21.936	123.085
16	75	Todd Bodine	Butch Mock Motorsports	Ford	21.943	123.046
17	28	Kenny Wallace	Robert Yates Racing	Ford	21.959	122.956
18	12	Derrike Cope	Bobby Allison Motorsports	Ford	21.963	122.934
19	43	John Andretti (R)	Petty Enterprises	Pontiac	21.973	122.878
20	30	Michael Waltrip	Bahari Racing	Pontiac	21.987	122.800
Failed to lock in Round 1
21	4	Sterling Marlin	Morgan–McClure Motorsports	Chevrolet	21.990	122.783
22	71	Dave Marcis	Marcis Auto Racing	Chevrolet	22.007	122.688
23	27	Jimmy Spencer	Junior Johnson & Associates	Ford	22.035	122.532
24	42	Kyle Petty	SABCO Racing	Pontiac	22.044	122.482
25	18	Dale Jarrett	Joe Gibbs Racing	Chevrolet	22.050	122.449
26	90	Mike Wallace (R)	Donlavey Racing	Ford	22.051	122.443
27	26	Brett Bodine	King Racing	Ford	22.055	122.421
28	21	Morgan Shepherd	Wood Brothers Racing	Ford	22.068	122.349
29	17	Darrell Waltrip	Darrell Waltrip Motorsports	Chevrolet	22.081	122.277
30	32	Dick Trickle	Active Motorsports	Chevrolet	22.088	122.238
31	33	Harry Gant	Leo Jackson Motorsports	Chevrolet	22.121	122.056
32	10	Ricky Rudd	Rudd Performance Motorsports	Ford	22.126	122.028
33	41	Joe Nemechek (R)	Larry Hedrick Motorsports	Chevrolet	22.128	122.017
34	95	Jeff Green	Sadler Brothers Racing	Ford	22.129	122.012
35	19	Loy Allen Jr. (R)	TriStar Motorsports	Ford	22.165	121.814
Provisionals
36	15	Lake Speed	Bud Moore Engineering	Ford	-*	-*
37	98	Jeremy Mayfield (R)	Cale Yarborough Motorsports	Ford	-*	-*
Champion's Provisional
38	11	Bill Elliott	Junior Johnson & Associates	Ford	-*	-*
Failed to qualify
39	47	Billy Standridge (R)	Johnson Standridge Racing	Ford	-*	-*
40	51	Dirk Stephens	Whitcomb Racing	Ford	-*	-*
41	80	Joe Ruttman	Hover Motorsports	Ford	-*	-*
42	9	Phil Parsons	Melling Racing	Ford	-*	-*
43	52	Brad Teague	Jimmy Means Racing	Ford	-*	-*
44	01	Billy Ogle Jr.	Ogle Racing	Chevrolet	-*	-*
45	8	Jeff Burton* (R)	Stavola Brothers Racing	Ford	22.000	122.727
Official first round qualifying results

*Time disallowed due to the car's roll cage having unapproved drilled holes.

== Race results ==
Fin	St	#	Driver	Team	Make	Laps	Led	Status	Pts	Winnings
1	3	5	Terry Labonte	Hendrick Motorsports	Chevrolet	400	237	running	185	$67,765
2	13	24	Jeff Gordon	Hendrick Motorsports	Chevrolet	400	2	running	175	$40,365
3	12	3	Dale Earnhardt	Richard Childress Racing	Chevrolet	400	41	running	170	$38,830
4	5	2	Rusty Wallace	Penske Racing South	Ford	400	90	running	165	$30,780
5	32	10	Ricky Rudd	Rudd Performance Motorsports	Ford	400	0	running	155	$26,705
6	14	6	Mark Martin	Roush Racing	Ford	400	0	running	150	$22,780
7	8	29	Steve Grissom (R)	Diamond Ridge Motorsports	Chevrolet	400	0	running	146	$19,380
8	27	26	Brett Bodine	King Racing	Ford	399	0	running	142	$16,580
9	10	25	Ken Schrader	Hendrick Motorsports	Chevrolet	399	0	running	138	$16,280
10	29	17	Darrell Waltrip	Darrell Waltrip Motorsports	Chevrolet	399	5	running	139	$18,280
11	19	43	John Andretti (R)	Petty Enterprises	Pontiac	399	0	running	130	$11,680
12	30	32	Dick Trickle	Active Motorsports	Chevrolet	399	0	running	127	$10,855
13	21	4	Sterling Marlin	Morgan–McClure Motorsports	Chevrolet	398	0	running	124	$17,705
14	28	21	Morgan Shepherd	Wood Brothers Racing	Ford	398	0	running	121	$17,605
15	38	11	Bill Elliott	Junior Johnson & Associates	Ford	397	0	running	118	$14,855
16	25	18	Dale Jarrett	Joe Gibbs Racing	Chevrolet	397	0	running	115	$18,830
17	1	16	Ted Musgrave	Roush Racing	Ford	397	1	running	117	$18,630
18	9	7	Geoff Bodine	Geoff Bodine Racing	Ford	397	0	running	109	$13,980
19	18	12	Derrike Cope	Bobby Allison Motorsports	Ford	396	0	running	106	$13,855
20	16	75	Todd Bodine	Butch Mock Motorsports	Ford	396	0	running	103	$10,380
21	36	15	Lake Speed	Bud Moore Engineering	Ford	396	0	running	100	$17,180
22	31	33	Harry Gant	Leo Jackson Motorsports	Chevrolet	395	0	running	97	$13,655
23	26	90	Mike Wallace (R)	Donlavey Racing	Ford	394	0	running	94	$9,480
24	4	22	Bobby Labonte	Bill Davis Racing	Pontiac	394	0	running	91	$13,355
25	15	31	Ward Burton (R)	A.G. Dillard Motorsports	Chevrolet	394	0	running	88	$7,005
26	20	30	Michael Waltrip	Bahari Racing	Pontiac	393	0	running	85	$13,180
27	6	77	Greg Sacks	U.S. Motorsports Inc.	Ford	393	0	running	82	$9,055
28	33	41	Joe Nemechek (R)	Larry Hedrick Motorsports	Chevrolet	392	0	running	79	$8,930
29	22	71	Dave Marcis	Marcis Auto Racing	Chevrolet	388	0	running	76	$8,905
30	2	23	Hut Stricklin	Travis Carter Enterprises	Ford	384	5	running	78	$8,355
31	35	19	Loy Allen Jr. (R)	TriStar Motorsports	Ford	383	0	running	70	$6,805
32	17	28	Kenny Wallace	Robert Yates Racing	Ford	364	0	rear end	67	$18,380
33	11	1	Rick Mast	Precision Products Racing	Ford	310	0	rear end	64	$10,775
34	7	40	Bobby Hamilton	SABCO Racing	Pontiac	302	19	engine	66	$11,255
35	23	27	Jimmy Spencer	Junior Johnson & Associates	Ford	159	0	ignition	58	$6,755
36	34	95	Jeff Green	Sadler Brothers Racing	Ford	42	0	transmission	55	$6,755
37	37	98	Jeremy Mayfield (R)	Cale Yarborough Motorsports	Ford	29	0	crash	52	$6,755
38	24	42	Kyle Petty	SABCO Racing	Pontiac	22	0	oil pump	49	$17,755
Official race results

== Standings after the race ==
Drivers' Championship standings

	Pos	Driver	Points
	1	Dale Earnhardt	3,620
1	2	Rusty Wallace	3,388 (-232)
1	3	Mark Martin	3,317 (-303)
	4	Ricky Rudd	3,210 (–410)
1	5	Ken Schrader	3,139 (–481)
1	6	Morgan Shepherd	3,077 (–543)
2	7	Ernie Irvan	3,026 (–594)
1	8	Jeff Gordon	2,921 (–699)
1	9	Bill Elliott	2,887 (–733)
	10	Michael Waltrip	2,829 (–791)
Official driver's standings

- Note: Only the first 10 positions are included for the driver standings.

Previous race: 1994 Mountain Dew Southern 500	NASCAR Winston Cup Series; 1994 season	Next race: 1994 SplitFire Spark Plug 500
