= 1994 SplitFire Spark Plug 500 =

25th race of the 1994 NASCAR Winston Cup Series

Race details
- Race 25 of 31 in the 1994 NASCAR Winston Cup Series
- The 1994 SplitFire Spark Plug 500 program cover.
- Date: September 18, 1994
- Official name: 24th Annual SplitFire Spark Plug 500
- Location: Dover, Delaware, Dover International Speedway
- Course: Permanent racing facility
- Course length: 1 miles (1.6 km)
- Distance: 500 laps, 500 mi (804.672 km)
- Scheduled distance: 500 laps, 500 mi (804.672 km)
- Average speed: 112.556 miles per hour (181.141 km/h)
- Attendance: 94,000

Pole position
Driver	Geoff Bodine	Geoff Bodine Racing
- Time: 23.554

Most laps led
Driver	Geoff Bodine	Geoff Bodine Racing
- Laps: 170

Winner
No. 2	Rusty Wallace	Penske Racing South

Television in the United States
- Network: TNN
- Announcers: Mike Joy, Buddy Baker

Radio in the United States
- Radio: Motor Racing Network

The 1994 SplitFire Spark Plug 500 was the 25th stock car race of the 1994 NASCAR Winston Cup Series season and the 24th iteration of the event. The race was held on Sunday, September 18, 1994, in Dover, Delaware at Dover International Speedway, a 1-mile (1.6 km) permanent oval-shaped racetrack. The race took the scheduled 500 laps to complete. With a handful laps to go in the race, previous damage sustained from an earlier incident caused Roush Racing driver Mark Martin to blow his right front tire with six laps to go in the race, propelling Penske Racing South driver Rusty Wallace to the lead when the caution would come out for Martin. Running with barely any fuel and a punctured left rear tire, Wallace was able to coast to the finish line, running at 20 miles per hour (32 km/h) under caution to take his 38th career NASCAR Winston Cup Series victory and his seventh victory of the season. To fill out the top three, Richard Childress Racing driver Dale Earnhardt and owner-driver Darrell Waltrip would finish second and third, respectively.

== Background ==
The layout of Dover International Speedway, the venue where the race was held.

Dover International Speedway is an oval race track in Dover, Delaware, United States that has held at least two NASCAR races since it opened in 1969. In addition to NASCAR, the track also hosted USAC and the NTT IndyCar Series. The track features one layout, a 1-mile (1.6 km) concrete oval, with 24° banking in the turns and 9° banking on the straights. The speedway is owned and operated by Dover Motorsports.

The track, nicknamed "The Monster Mile", was built in 1969 by Melvin Joseph of Melvin L. Joseph Construction Company, Inc., with an asphalt surface, but was replaced with concrete in 1995. Six years later in 2001, the track's capacity moved to 135,000 seats, making the track have the largest capacity of sports venue in the mid-Atlantic. In 2002, the name changed to Dover International Speedway from Dover Downs International Speedway after Dover Downs Gaming and Entertainment split, making Dover Motorsports. From 2007 to 2009, the speedway worked on an improvement project called "The Monster Makeover", which expanded facilities at the track and beautified the track. After the 2014 season, the track's capacity was reduced to 95,500 seats.

=== Entry list ===
- (R) denotes rookie driver.

#	Driver	Team	Make
1	Rick Mast	Precision Products Racing	Ford
2	Rusty Wallace	Penske Racing South	Ford
3	Dale Earnhardt	Richard Childress Racing	Chevrolet
4	Sterling Marlin	Morgan–McClure Motorsports	Chevrolet
5	Terry Labonte	Hendrick Motorsports	Chevrolet
6	Mark Martin	Roush Racing	Ford
7	Geoff Bodine	Geoff Bodine Racing	Ford
8	Jeff Burton (R)	Stavola Brothers Racing	Ford
10	Ricky Rudd	Rudd Performance Motorsports	Ford
11	Bill Elliott	Junior Johnson & Associates	Ford
12	Derrike Cope	Bobby Allison Motorsports	Ford
15	Lake Speed	Bud Moore Engineering	Ford
16	Ted Musgrave	Roush Racing	Ford
17	Darrell Waltrip	Darrell Waltrip Motorsports	Chevrolet
18	Dale Jarrett	Joe Gibbs Racing	Chevrolet
19	Loy Allen Jr. (R)	TriStar Motorsports	Ford
21	Morgan Shepherd	Wood Brothers Racing	Ford
22	Bobby Labonte	Bill Davis Racing	Pontiac
23	Hut Stricklin	Travis Carter Enterprises	Ford
24	Jeff Gordon	Hendrick Motorsports	Chevrolet
25	Ken Schrader	Hendrick Motorsports	Chevrolet
26	Brett Bodine	King Racing	Ford
27	Jimmy Spencer	Junior Johnson & Associates	Ford
28	Kenny Wallace	Robert Yates Racing	Ford
29	Steve Grissom	Diamond Ridge Motorsports	Chevrolet
30	Michael Waltrip	Bahari Racing	Pontiac
31	Ward Burton	A.G. Dillard Motorsports	Chevrolet
32	Dick Trickle	Active Motorsports	Chevrolet
33	Harry Gant	Leo Jackson Motorsports	Chevrolet
40	Bobby Hamilton	SABCO Racing	Pontiac
41	Joe Nemechek (R)	Larry Hedrick Motorsports	Chevrolet
42	Kyle Petty	SABCO Racing	Pontiac
43	John Andretti (R)	Petty Enterprises	Pontiac
47	Billy Standridge (R)	Johnson Standridge Racing	Ford
52	Brad Teague	Jimmy Means Racing	Ford
55	Tim Fedewa	RaDiUs Motorsports	Ford
71	Dave Marcis	Marcis Auto Racing	Chevrolet
75	Todd Bodine	Butch Mock Motorsports	Ford
77	Greg Sacks	U.S. Motorsports Inc.	Ford
79	Doug French	Waters Racing	Chevrolet
84	Norm Benning	Norm Benning Racing	Ford
90	Mike Wallace (R)	Donlavey Racing	Ford
98	Jeremy Mayfield (R)	Cale Yarborough Motorsports	Ford

== Qualifying ==
Qualifying was split into two rounds. The first round was held on Friday, September 16, at 3:00 PM EST. Each driver would have one lap to set a time. During the first round, the top 20 drivers in the round would be guaranteed a starting spot in the race. If a driver was not able to guarantee a spot in the first round, they had the option to scrub their time from the first round and try and run a faster lap time in a second round qualifying run, held on Saturday, September 17, at 11:00 AM EST. As with the first round, each driver would have one lap to set a time. For this specific race, positions 21-40 would be decided on time, and depending on who needed it, a select amount of positions were given to cars who had not otherwise qualified but were high enough in owner's points; up to two provisionals were given. If needed, a past champion who did not qualify on either time or provisionals could use a champion's provisional, adding one more spot to the field.

Geoff Bodine, driving for his own Geoff Bodine Racing team, won the pole, setting a time of 23.554 and an average speed of 152.840 mph (245.972 km/h) in the first round.

Three drivers would fail to qualify.

=== Full qualifying results ===
Pos.	#	Driver	Team	Make	Time	Speed
1	7	Geoff Bodine	Geoff Bodine Racing	Ford	23.554	152.840
2	32	Dick Trickle	Active Motorsports	Chevrolet	23.571	152.730
3	31	Ward Burton (R)	A.G. Dillard Motorsports	Chevrolet	23.578	152.685
4	6	Mark Martin	Roush Racing	Ford	23.698	151.912
5	26	Brett Bodine	King Racing	Ford	23.755	151.547
6	8	Jeff Burton (R)	Stavola Brothers Racing	Ford	23.779	151.394
7	28	Kenny Wallace	Robert Yates Racing	Ford	23.823	151.114
8	1	Rick Mast	Precision Products Racing	Ford	23.832	151.057
9	75	Todd Bodine	Butch Mock Motorsports	Ford	23.858	150.893
10	2	Rusty Wallace	Penske Racing South	Ford	23.864	150.855
11	40	Bobby Hamilton	SABCO Racing	Pontiac	23.884	150.729
12	24	Jeff Gordon	Hendrick Motorsports	Chevrolet	23.886	150.716
13	11	Bill Elliott	Junior Johnson & Associates	Ford	23.886	150.716
14	25	Ken Schrader	Hendrick Motorsports	Chevrolet	23.889	150.697
15	42	Kyle Petty	SABCO Racing	Pontiac	23.911	150.558
16	10	Ricky Rudd	Rudd Performance Motorsports	Ford	23.920	150.502
17	12	Derrike Cope	Bobby Allison Motorsports	Ford	23.920	150.502
18	4	Sterling Marlin	Morgan–McClure Motorsports	Chevrolet	23.948	150.326
19	18	Dale Jarrett	Joe Gibbs Racing	Chevrolet	23.950	150.313
20	21	Morgan Shepherd	Wood Brothers Racing	Ford	23.951	150.307
Failed to lock in Round 1
21	41	Joe Nemechek (R)	Larry Hedrick Motorsports	Chevrolet	23.939	150.382
22	15	Lake Speed	Bud Moore Engineering	Ford	23.965	150.219
23	43	John Andretti (R)	Petty Enterprises	Pontiac	24.012	149.925
24	71	Dave Marcis	Marcis Auto Racing	Chevrolet	24.031	149.806
25	90	Mike Wallace (R)	Donlavey Racing	Ford	24.042	149.738
26	16	Ted Musgrave	Roush Racing	Ford	24.043	149.732
27	27	Jimmy Spencer	Junior Johnson & Associates	Ford	24.083	149.483
28	30	Michael Waltrip	Bahari Racing	Pontiac	24.084	149.477
29	5	Terry Labonte	Hendrick Motorsports	Chevrolet	24.108	149.328
30	33	Harry Gant	Leo Jackson Motorsports	Chevrolet	24.146	149.093
31	22	Bobby Labonte	Bill Davis Racing	Pontiac	24.151	149.062
32	23	Hut Stricklin	Travis Carter Enterprises	Ford	24.151	149.062
33	98	Jeremy Mayfield (R)	Cale Yarborough Motorsports	Ford	24.157	149.025
34	29	Steve Grissom (R)	Diamond Ridge Motorsports	Chevrolet	24.180	148.883
35	17	Darrell Waltrip	Darrell Waltrip Motorsports	Chevrolet	24.226	148.601
36	77	Greg Sacks	U.S. Motorsports Inc.	Ford	24.258	148.405
37	3	Dale Earnhardt	Richard Childress Racing	Chevrolet	24.486	147.023
38	55	Tim Fedewa	RaDiUs Motorsports	Ford	24.578	146.472
39	52	Brad Teague	Jimmy Means Racing	Ford	24.722	145.619
40	19	Loy Allen Jr. (R)	TriStar Motorsports	Ford	25.093	143.466
Failed to qualify
41	84	Norm Benning	Norm Benning Racing	Ford	-*	-*
42	79	Doug French	Waters Racing	Chevrolet	-*	-*
43	47	Billy Standridge (R)	Johnson Standridge Racing	Ford	-*	-*
Official first round qualifying results
Official starting lineup

== Race results ==
Fin	St	#	Driver	Team	Make	Laps	Led	Status	Pts	Winnings
1	10	2	Rusty Wallace	Penske Racing South	Ford	500	56	running	180	$55,055
2	37	3	Dale Earnhardt	Richard Childress Racing	Chevrolet	500	62	running	175	$47,980
3	35	17	Darrell Waltrip	Darrell Waltrip Motorsports	Chevrolet	500	11	running	170	$36,705
4	14	25	Ken Schrader	Hendrick Motorsports	Chevrolet	500	20	running	165	$32,965
5	1	7	Geoff Bodine	Geoff Bodine Racing	Ford	500	170	running	165	$31,520
6	15	42	Kyle Petty	SABCO Racing	Pontiac	500	0	running	150	$24,965
7	29	5	Terry Labonte	Hendrick Motorsports	Chevrolet	500	0	running	146	$23,015
8	34	29	Steve Grissom (R)	Diamond Ridge Motorsports	Chevrolet	499	1	running	147	$16,815
9	22	15	Lake Speed	Bud Moore Engineering	Ford	499	0	running	138	$21,765
10	20	21	Morgan Shepherd	Wood Brothers Racing	Ford	499	0	running	134	$23,565
11	12	24	Jeff Gordon	Hendrick Motorsports	Chevrolet	499	0	running	130	$20,615
12	17	12	Derrike Cope	Bobby Allison Motorsports	Ford	499	0	running	127	$13,415
13	30	33	Harry Gant	Leo Jackson Motorsports	Chevrolet	499	0	running	124	$17,015
14	26	16	Ted Musgrave	Roush Racing	Ford	498	0	running	121	$16,615
15	8	1	Rick Mast	Precision Products Racing	Ford	498	0	running	118	$16,665
16	9	75	Todd Bodine	Butch Mock Motorsports	Ford	497	0	running	115	$11,865
17	31	22	Bobby Labonte	Bill Davis Racing	Pontiac	497	0	running	112	$15,665
18	16	10	Ricky Rudd	Rudd Performance Motorsports	Ford	496	0	running	109	$15,450
19	4	6	Mark Martin	Roush Racing	Ford	494	158	crash	111	$23,065
20	7	28	Kenny Wallace	Robert Yates Racing	Ford	494	2	running	108	$20,965
21	2	32	Dick Trickle	Active Motorsports	Chevrolet	494	0	running	100	$11,165
22	40	19	Loy Allen Jr. (R)	TriStar Motorsports	Ford	491	0	running	97	$9,115
23	38	55	Tim Fedewa	RaDiUs Motorsports	Ford	487	0	running	94	$8,565
24	33	98	Jeremy Mayfield (R)	Cale Yarborough Motorsports	Ford	472	0	running	91	$10,915
25	23	43	John Andretti (R)	Petty Enterprises	Pontiac	468	1	running	93	$10,765
26	5	26	Brett Bodine	King Racing	Ford	462	0	running	85	$14,615
27	3	31	Ward Burton (R)	A.G. Dillard Motorsports	Chevrolet	417	0	running	82	$8,465
28	13	11	Bill Elliott	Junior Johnson & Associates	Ford	404	0	running	79	$14,415
29	25	90	Mike Wallace (R)	Donlavey Racing	Ford	398	0	rear end	76	$10,265
30	18	4	Sterling Marlin	Morgan–McClure Motorsports	Chevrolet	380	0	running	73	$18,215
31	11	40	Bobby Hamilton	SABCO Racing	Pontiac	379	0	crash	70	$14,165
32	32	23	Hut Stricklin	Travis Carter Enterprises	Ford	367	0	running	67	$9,605
33	28	30	Michael Waltrip	Bahari Racing	Pontiac	326	0	running	64	$12,055
34	19	18	Dale Jarrett	Joe Gibbs Racing	Chevrolet	323	0	crash	61	$19,405
35	24	71	Dave Marcis	Marcis Auto Racing	Chevrolet	273	0	engine	58	$7,805
36	21	41	Joe Nemechek (R)	Larry Hedrick Motorsports	Chevrolet	225	8	crash	60	$8,280
37	6	8	Jeff Burton (R)	Stavola Brothers Racing	Ford	189	8	crash	57	$13,280
38	36	77	Greg Sacks	U.S. Motorsports Inc.	Ford	118	3	crash	54	$7,780
39	27	27	Jimmy Spencer	Junior Johnson & Associates	Ford	100	0	engine	46	$7,780
40	39	52	Brad Teague	Jimmy Means Racing	Ford	29	0	timing chain	43	$7,780
Official race results

== Standings after the race ==
Drivers' Championship standings

	Pos	Driver	Points
	1	Dale Earnhardt	3,795
	2	Rusty Wallace	3,568 (-227)
	3	Mark Martin	3,428 (-367)
	4	Ricky Rudd	3,319 (–476)
	5	Ken Schrader	3,304 (–491)
	6	Morgan Shepherd	3,211 (–584)
1	7	Jeff Gordon	3,054 (–744)
1	8	Ernie Irvan	3,026 (–769)
	9	Bill Elliott	2,966 (–829)
2	10	Darrell Waltrip	2,959 (–836)
Official driver's standings

- Note: Only the first 10 positions are included for the driver standings.

Previous race: 1994 Miller Genuine Draft 400 (Richmond)	NASCAR Winston Cup Series; 1994 season	Next race: 1994 Goody's 500 (Martinsville)
