= 1994 Tyson Holly Farms 400 =

27th race of the 1994 NASCAR Winston Cup Series

Race details
- Race 27 of 31 in the 1994 NASCAR Winston Cup Series
- The 1994 Tyson Holly Farms 400 program cover, featuring Rusty Wallace.
- Date: October 2, 1994
- Official name: 45th Annual Tyson Holly Farms 400
- Location: North Wilkesboro Speedway, North Wilkesboro, North Carolina
- Course: Permanent racing facility
- Course length: 0.625 miles (1.006 km)
- Distance: 400 laps, 250 mi (402.336 km)
- Scheduled distance: 400 laps, 250 mi (402.336 km)
- Average speed: 98.522 miles per hour (158.556 km/h)
- Attendance: 54,000

Pole position
Driver	Jimmy Spencer	Junior Johnson & Associates
- Time: 18.978

Most laps led
Driver	Geoff Bodine	Geoff Bodine Racing
- Laps: 334

Winner
No. 7	Geoff Bodine	Geoff Bodine Racing

Television in the United States
- Network: ESPN
- Announcers: Bob Jenkins, Ned Jarrett, Benny Parsons

Radio in the United States
- Radio: Motor Racing Network

The 1994 Tyson Holly Farms 400 was the 27th stock car race of the 1994 NASCAR Winston Cup Series season and the 45th iteration of the event. The race was held on Sunday, October 2, 1994, in North Wilkesboro, North Carolina at the North Wilkesboro Speedway, a 0.625 miles (1.006 km) oval short track. The race took the scheduled 400 laps to complete. In a dominant performance, owner-driver Geoff Bodine would manage to lap the entire field at race's end to take his 17th career NASCAR Winston Cup Series victory and his third and final victory of the season. To fill out the top three, Hendrick Motorsports driver Terry Labonte and Precision Products Racing driver Rick Mast would finish second and third, respectively.

Bodine's performance remains the last time a driver has managed to lap the field in a race.

== Background ==
The layout of North Wilkesboro Speedway, the venue where the race was held.

North Wilkesboro Speedway is a short oval racetrack located on U.S. Route 421, about five miles east of the town of North Wilkesboro, North Carolina, or 80 miles north of Charlotte. It measures 0.625 mi (1.006 km) and features a unique uphill backstretch and downhill frontstretch. It has previously held races in NASCAR's top three series, including 93 Winston Cup Series races. The track, a NASCAR original, operated from 1949, NASCAR's inception, until the track's original closure in 1996. The speedway briefly reopened in 2010 and hosted several stock car series races before closing again in the spring of 2011. It was re-opened in August 2022 for grassroots racing. The track returned to hosting the NASCAR Cup series for the 2023 All Star Race. The track would host it again in 2024 and 2025. A few months after the 2025 All Star race NASCAR announced that the All Star race would move to Dover while North Wilkesboro would return to hosting a points paying race in 2026.

=== Entry list ===
- (R) denotes rookie driver.

#	Driver	Team	Make
1	Rick Mast	Precision Products Racing	Ford
2	Rusty Wallace	Penske Racing South	Ford
3	Dale Earnhardt	Richard Childress Racing	Chevrolet
4	Sterling Marlin	Morgan–McClure Motorsports	Chevrolet
5	Terry Labonte	Hendrick Motorsports	Chevrolet
6	Mark Martin	Roush Racing	Ford
7	Geoff Bodine	Geoff Bodine Racing	Ford
8	Jeff Burton (R)	Stavola Brothers Racing	Ford
9	Phil Parsons	Melling Racing	Ford
10	Ricky Rudd	Rudd Performance Motorsports	Ford
11	Bill Elliott	Junior Johnson & Associates	Ford
12	Derrike Cope	Bobby Allison Motorsports	Ford
15	Lake Speed	Bud Moore Engineering	Ford
16	Ted Musgrave	Roush Racing	Ford
17	Darrell Waltrip	Darrell Waltrip Motorsports	Chevrolet
18	Dale Jarrett	Joe Gibbs Racing	Chevrolet
19	Loy Allen Jr. (R)	TriStar Motorsports	Ford
21	Morgan Shepherd	Wood Brothers Racing	Ford
22	Bobby Labonte	Bill Davis Racing	Pontiac
23	Hut Stricklin	Travis Carter Enterprises	Ford
24	Jeff Gordon	Hendrick Motorsports	Chevrolet
25	Ken Schrader	Hendrick Motorsports	Chevrolet
26	Brett Bodine	King Racing	Ford
27	Jimmy Spencer	Junior Johnson & Associates	Ford
28	Kenny Wallace	Robert Yates Racing	Ford
29	Steve Grissom	Diamond Ridge Motorsports	Chevrolet
30	Michael Waltrip	Bahari Racing	Pontiac
31	Ward Burton	A.G. Dillard Motorsports	Chevrolet
32	Dick Trickle	Active Motorsports	Chevrolet
33	Harry Gant	Leo Jackson Motorsports	Chevrolet
40	Bobby Hamilton	SABCO Racing	Pontiac
41	Joe Nemechek (R)	Larry Hedrick Motorsports	Chevrolet
42	Kyle Petty	SABCO Racing	Pontiac
43	John Andretti (R)	Petty Enterprises	Pontiac
52	Brad Teague	Jimmy Means Racing	Ford
55	Tim Fedewa	RaDiUs Motorsports	Ford
71	Dave Marcis	Marcis Auto Racing	Chevrolet
75	Todd Bodine	Butch Mock Motorsports	Ford
77	Greg Sacks	U.S. Motorsports Inc.	Ford
90	Mike Wallace (R)	Donlavey Racing	Ford
95	Jeff Green	Sadler Brothers Racing	Ford
98	Jeremy Mayfield (R)	Cale Yarborough Motorsports	Ford

== Qualifying ==
Qualifying was split into two rounds. The first round was held on Friday, September 30, at 3:00 PM EST. Each driver would have one lap to set a time. During the first round, the top 20 drivers in the round would be guaranteed a starting spot in the race. If a driver was not able to guarantee a spot in the first round, they had the option to scrub their time from the first round and try and run a faster lap time in a second round qualifying run, held on Saturday, October 1, at 12:00 PM EST. As with the first round, each driver would have one lap to set a time. For this specific race, positions 21-34 would be decided on time, and depending on who needed it, a select amount of positions were given to cars who had not otherwise qualified but were high enough in owner's points; up to two provisionals were given. If needed, a past champion who did not qualify on either time or provisionals could use a champion's provisional, adding one more spot to the field.

Jimmy Spencer, driving for Junior Johnson & Associates, won the pole, setting a time of 18.978 and an average speed of 118.558 mph (190.801 km/h) in the first round.

Six drivers would fail to qualify.

=== Full qualifying results ===
Pos.	#	Driver	Team	Make	Time	Speed
1	27	Jimmy Spencer	Junior Johnson & Associates	Ford	18.978	118.558
2	11	Bill Elliott	Junior Johnson & Associates	Ford	18.979	118.552
3	3	Dale Earnhardt	Richard Childress Racing	Chevrolet	19.007	118.377
4	6	Mark Martin	Roush Racing	Ford	19.028	118.247
5	95	Jeff Green	Sadler Brothers Racing	Ford	19.029	118.241
6	71	Dave Marcis	Marcis Auto Racing	Chevrolet	19.041	118.166
7	17	Darrell Waltrip	Darrell Waltrip Motorsports	Chevrolet	19.046	118.135
8	40	Bobby Hamilton	SABCO Racing	Pontiac	19.059	118.054
9	28	Kenny Wallace	Robert Yates Racing	Ford	19.069	117.993
10	5	Terry Labonte	Hendrick Motorsports	Chevrolet	19.069	117.993
11	77	Greg Sacks	U.S. Motorsports Inc.	Ford	19.082	117.912
12	24	Jeff Gordon	Hendrick Motorsports	Chevrolet	19.087	117.881
13	30	Michael Waltrip	Bahari Racing	Pontiac	19.103	117.783
14	8	Jeff Burton (R)	Stavola Brothers Racing	Ford	19.107	117.758
15	26	Brett Bodine	King Racing	Ford	19.120	117.678
16	12	Derrike Cope	Bobby Allison Motorsports	Ford	19.128	117.629
17	1	Rick Mast	Precision Products Racing	Ford	19.136	117.579
18	7	Geoff Bodine	Geoff Bodine Racing	Ford	19.142	117.543
19	2	Rusty Wallace	Penske Racing South	Ford	19.151	117.487
20	22	Bobby Labonte	Bill Davis Racing	Pontiac	19.170	117.371
Failed to lock in Round 1
21	31	Ward Burton (R)	A.G. Dillard Motorsports	Chevrolet	19.016	118.321
22	42	Kyle Petty	SABCO Racing	Pontiac	19.176	117.334
23	33	Harry Gant	Leo Jackson Motorsports	Chevrolet	19.177	117.328
24	4	Sterling Marlin	Morgan–McClure Motorsports	Chevrolet	19.184	117.285
25	23	Hut Stricklin	Travis Carter Enterprises	Ford	19.191	117.242
26	10	Ricky Rudd	Rudd Performance Motorsports	Ford	19.196	117.212
27	25	Ken Schrader	Hendrick Motorsports	Chevrolet	19.198	117.200
28	43	John Andretti (R)	Petty Enterprises	Pontiac	19.207	117.145
29	16	Ted Musgrave	Roush Racing	Ford	19.211	117.120
30	9	Phil Parsons	Melling Racing	Ford	19.221	117.059
31	32	Dick Trickle	Active Motorsports	Chevrolet	19.224	117.041
32	41	Joe Nemechek (R)	Larry Hedrick Motorsports	Chevrolet	19.229	117.011
33	29	Steve Grissom (R)	Diamond Ridge Motorsports	Chevrolet	19.236	116.968
34	98	Jeremy Mayfield (R)	Cale Yarborough Motorsports	Ford	19.263	116.804
Provisionals
35	21	Morgan Shepherd	Wood Brothers Racing	Ford	19.319	116.466
36	15	Lake Speed	Bud Moore Engineering	Ford	19.271	116.756
Failed to qualify
37	90	Mike Wallace (R)	Donlavey Racing	Ford	19.277	116.719
38	18	Dale Jarrett	Joe Gibbs Racing	Chevrolet	19.280	116.701
39	19	Loy Allen Jr. (R)	TriStar Motorsports	Ford	19.305	116.550
40	52	Brad Teague	Jimmy Means Racing	Ford	19.377	116.117
41	75	Todd Bodine	Butch Mock Motorsports	Ford	19.414	115.896
42	55	Tim Fedewa	RaDiUs Motorsports	Ford	19.527	115.225
Official first round qualifying results
Official starting lineup

== Race results ==
Fin	St	#	Driver	Team	Make	Laps	Led	Status	Pts	Winnings
1	18	7	Geoff Bodine	Geoff Bodine Racing	Ford	400	334	running	185	$61,440
2	10	5	Terry Labonte	Hendrick Motorsports	Chevrolet	399	0	running	170	$39,365
3	17	1	Rick Mast	Precision Products Racing	Ford	399	0	running	165	$32,590
4	19	2	Rusty Wallace	Penske Racing South	Ford	399	0	running	160	$23,590
5	4	6	Mark Martin	Roush Racing	Ford	398	0	running	155	$24,090
6	2	11	Bill Elliott	Junior Johnson & Associates	Ford	398	4	running	155	$15,940
7	3	3	Dale Earnhardt	Richard Childress Racing	Chevrolet	398	38	running	151	$21,315
8	12	24	Jeff Gordon	Hendrick Motorsports	Chevrolet	398	0	running	142	$16,875
9	29	16	Ted Musgrave	Roush Racing	Ford	397	0	running	138	$15,950
10	9	28	Kenny Wallace	Robert Yates Racing	Ford	397	0	running	134	$20,355
11	26	10	Ricky Rudd	Rudd Performance Motorsports	Ford	397	0	running	130	$13,550
12	8	40	Bobby Hamilton	SABCO Racing	Pontiac	396	0	running	127	$13,200
13	7	17	Darrell Waltrip	Darrell Waltrip Motorsports	Chevrolet	396	0	running	124	$12,950
14	27	25	Ken Schrader	Hendrick Motorsports	Chevrolet	396	0	running	121	$12,725
15	20	22	Bobby Labonte	Bill Davis Racing	Pontiac	395	0	running	118	$12,950
16	31	32	Dick Trickle	Active Motorsports	Chevrolet	394	0	running	115	$8,225
17	28	43	John Andretti (R)	Petty Enterprises	Pontiac	394	0	running	112	$9,050
18	21	31	Ward Burton (R)	A.G. Dillard Motorsports	Chevrolet	394	8	running	114	$7,550
19	16	12	Derrike Cope	Bobby Allison Motorsports	Ford	394	0	running	106	$11,850
20	33	29	Steve Grissom (R)	Diamond Ridge Motorsports	Chevrolet	394	0	running	103	$7,725
21	13	30	Michael Waltrip	Bahari Racing	Pontiac	393	0	running	100	$11,500
22	25	23	Hut Stricklin	Travis Carter Enterprises	Ford	392	0	running	97	$7,375
23	1	27	Jimmy Spencer	Junior Johnson & Associates	Ford	392	5	running	99	$13,425
24	6	71	Dave Marcis	Marcis Auto Racing	Chevrolet	391	0	running	91	$6,950
25	36	15	Lake Speed	Bud Moore Engineering	Ford	391	0	running	88	$14,925
26	22	42	Kyle Petty	SABCO Racing	Pontiac	388	0	running	85	$15,925
27	34	98	Jeremy Mayfield (R)	Cale Yarborough Motorsports	Ford	387	0	running	82	$6,800
28	14	8	Jeff Burton (R)	Stavola Brothers Racing	Ford	381	11	running	84	$10,210
29	5	95	Jeff Green	Sadler Brothers Racing	Ford	354	0	running	76	$4,700
30	35	21	Morgan Shepherd	Wood Brothers Racing	Ford	343	0	crash	73	$14,350
31	24	4	Sterling Marlin	Morgan–McClure Motorsports	Chevrolet	339	0	engine	70	$14,300
32	23	33	Harry Gant	Leo Jackson Motorsports	Chevrolet	324	0	crash	67	$9,275
33	15	26	Brett Bodine	King Racing	Ford	298	0	rear end	64	$8,225
34	32	41	Joe Nemechek (R)	Larry Hedrick Motorsports	Chevrolet	274	0	rear end	61	$4,250
35	11	77	Greg Sacks	U.S. Motorsports Inc.	Ford	268	0	running	58	$4,225
36	30	9	Phil Parsons	Melling Racing	Ford	264	0	engine	55	$4,250
Official race results

== Standings after the race ==
Drivers' Championship standings

	Pos	Driver	Points
	1	Dale Earnhardt	4,121
	2	Rusty Wallace	3,913 (-208)
	3	Mark Martin	3,698 (-423)
	4	Ken Schrader	3,575 (–546)
	5	Ricky Rudd	3,537 (–584)
	6	Morgan Shepherd	3,407 (–714)
	7	Jeff Gordon	3,328 (–793)
	8	Bill Elliott	3,286 (–835)
1	9	Terry Labonte	3,243 (–878)
1	10	Darrell Waltrip	3,217 (–904)
Official driver's standings

- Note: Only the first 10 positions are included for the driver standings.

Previous race: 1994 Goody's 500 (Martinsville)	NASCAR Winston Cup Series; 1994 season	Next race: 1994 Mello Yello 500
