= 1994 Goody's 500 (Martinsville) =

26th race of the 1994 NASCAR Winston Cup Series

Race details
- Race 26 of 31 in the 1994 NASCAR Winston Cup Series
- The 1994 Goody's 500 program cover, featuring Ernie Irvan.
- Date: September 25, 1994
- Official name: 46th Annual Goody's 500
- Location: Ridgeway, Virginia, Martinsville Speedway
- Course: Permanent racing facility
- Course length: 0.526 miles (0.847 km)
- Distance: 500 laps, 263 mi (423.257 km)
- Scheduled distance: 500 laps, 263 mi (423.257 km)
- Average speed: 77.139 miles per hour (124.143 km/h)
- Attendance: 57,000

Pole position
Driver	Ted Musgrave	Roush Racing
- Time: 20.117

Most laps led
Driver	Rusty Wallace	Penske Racing South
- Laps: 368

Winner
No. 2	Rusty Wallace	Penske Racing South

Television in the United States
- Network: ESPN
- Announcers: Bob Jenkins, Ned Jarrett, Benny Parsons

Radio in the United States
- Radio: Motor Racing Network

The 1994 Goody's 500 was the 26th stock car race of the 1994 NASCAR Winston Cup Series season and the 46th iteration of the event. The race was held on Sunday, September 25, 1994, in Martinsville, Virginia at Martinsville Speedway, a 0.526 miles (0.847 km) permanent oval-shaped short track. The race took the scheduled 500 laps to complete. At race's end, Penske Racing South driver Rusty Wallace would manage to dominate a majority of the race to take his 39th career NASCAR Winston Cup Series victory and his eighth and final victory of the season. To fill out the top three, Richard Childress Racing driver Dale Earnhardt and Junior Johnson & Associates driver Bill Elliott would finish second and third, respectively.

== Background ==
The layout of Martinsville Speedway, the venue where the race was held.

Martinsville Speedway is a NASCAR-owned stock car racing track located in Henry County, in Ridgeway, Virginia, just to the south of Martinsville. At 0.526 miles (0.847 km) in length, it is the shortest track in the NASCAR Cup Series. The track was also one of the first paved oval tracks in NASCAR, being built in 1947 by H. Clay Earles. It is also the only remaining race track that has been on the NASCAR circuit from its beginning in 1948.

=== Entry list ===
- (R) denotes rookie driver.

#	Driver	Team	Make
1	Rick Mast	Precision Products Racing	Ford
2	Rusty Wallace	Penske Racing South	Ford
3	Dale Earnhardt	Richard Childress Racing	Chevrolet
4	Sterling Marlin	Morgan–McClure Motorsports	Chevrolet
5	Terry Labonte	Hendrick Motorsports	Chevrolet
6	Mark Martin	Roush Racing	Ford
7	Geoff Bodine	Geoff Bodine Racing	Ford
8	Jeff Burton (R)	Stavola Brothers Racing	Ford
10	Ricky Rudd	Rudd Performance Motorsports	Ford
11	Bill Elliott	Junior Johnson & Associates	Ford
12	Derrike Cope	Bobby Allison Motorsports	Ford
15	Lake Speed	Bud Moore Engineering	Ford
16	Ted Musgrave	Roush Racing	Ford
17	Darrell Waltrip	Darrell Waltrip Motorsports	Chevrolet
18	Dale Jarrett	Joe Gibbs Racing	Chevrolet
19	Loy Allen Jr. (R)	TriStar Motorsports	Ford
20	Bobby Hillin Jr.	Moroso Racing	Ford
21	Morgan Shepherd	Wood Brothers Racing	Ford
22	Bobby Labonte	Bill Davis Racing	Pontiac
23	Hut Stricklin	Travis Carter Enterprises	Ford
24	Jeff Gordon	Hendrick Motorsports	Chevrolet
25	Ken Schrader	Hendrick Motorsports	Chevrolet
26	Brett Bodine	King Racing	Ford
27	Jimmy Spencer	Junior Johnson & Associates	Ford
28	Kenny Wallace	Robert Yates Racing	Ford
29	Steve Grissom	Diamond Ridge Motorsports	Chevrolet
30	Michael Waltrip	Bahari Racing	Pontiac
31	Ward Burton	A.G. Dillard Motorsports	Chevrolet
32	Dick Trickle	Active Motorsports	Chevrolet
33	Harry Gant	Leo Jackson Motorsports	Chevrolet
40	Bobby Hamilton	SABCO Racing	Pontiac
41	Joe Nemechek (R)	Larry Hedrick Motorsports	Chevrolet
42	Kyle Petty	SABCO Racing	Pontiac
43	John Andretti (R)	Petty Enterprises	Pontiac
52	Brad Teague	Jimmy Means Racing	Ford
55	Tim Fedewa	RaDiUs Motorsports	Ford
71	Dave Marcis	Marcis Auto Racing	Chevrolet
75	Todd Bodine	Butch Mock Motorsports	Ford
77	Greg Sacks	U.S. Motorsports Inc.	Ford
90	Mike Wallace (R)	Donlavey Racing	Ford
98	Jeremy Mayfield (R)	Cale Yarborough Motorsports	Ford

== Qualifying ==
Qualifying was split into two rounds. The first round was held on Friday, September 23, at 3:00 PM EST. Each driver would have one lap to set a time. During the first round, the top 20 drivers in the round would be guaranteed a starting spot in the race. If a driver was not able to guarantee a spot in the first round, they had the option to scrub their time from the first round and try and run a faster lap time in a second round qualifying run, held on Saturday, September 24, at 12:30 PM EST. As with the first round, each driver would have one lap to set a time. For this specific race, positions 21-34 would be decided on time, and depending on who needed it, a select amount of positions were given to cars who had not otherwise qualified but were high enough in owner's points; up to two provisionals were given. If needed, a past champion who did not qualify on either time or provisionals could use a champion's provisional, adding one more spot to the field.

Ted Musgrave, driving for Roush Racing, would win the pole, setting a time of 20.117 and an average speed of 94.129 miles per hour (151.486 km/h) in the first round.

Five drivers would fail to qualify.

=== Full qualifying results ===
Pos.	#	Driver	Team	Make	Time	Speed
1	16	Ted Musgrave	Roush Racing	Ford	20.117	94.129
2	7	Geoff Bodine	Geoff Bodine Racing	Ford	20.178	93.845
3	8	Jeff Burton (R)	Stavola Brothers Racing	Ford	20.180	93.835
4	43	John Andretti (R)	Petty Enterprises	Pontiac	20.235	93.580
5	6	Mark Martin	Roush Racing	Ford	20.238	93.567
6	24	Jeff Gordon	Hendrick Motorsports	Chevrolet	20.271	93.414
7	2	Rusty Wallace	Penske Racing South	Ford	20.296	93.299
8	18	Dale Jarrett	Joe Gibbs Racing	Chevrolet	20.302	93.272
9	4	Sterling Marlin	Morgan–McClure Motorsports	Chevrolet	20.306	93.253
10	11	Bill Elliott	Junior Johnson & Associates	Ford	20.318	93.198
11	17	Darrell Waltrip	Darrell Waltrip Motorsports	Chevrolet	20.341	93.093
12	28	Kenny Wallace	Robert Yates Racing	Ford	20.347	93.065
13	10	Ricky Rudd	Rudd Performance Motorsports	Ford	20.348	93.061
14	25	Ken Schrader	Hendrick Motorsports	Chevrolet	20.351	93.047
15	15	Lake Speed	Bud Moore Engineering	Ford	20.361	93.001
16	42	Kyle Petty	SABCO Racing	Pontiac	20.368	92.969
17	5	Terry Labonte	Hendrick Motorsports	Chevrolet	20.386	92.887
18	31	Ward Burton (R)	A.G. Dillard Motorsports	Chevrolet	20.388	92.878
19	12	Derrike Cope	Bobby Allison Motorsports	Ford	20.398	92.833
20	3	Dale Earnhardt	Richard Childress Racing	Chevrolet	20.401	92.818
Failed to lock in Round 1
21	23	Hut Stricklin	Travis Carter Enterprises	Ford	20.431	92.683
22	22	Bobby Labonte	Bill Davis Racing	Pontiac	20.434	92.669
23	21	Morgan Shepherd	Wood Brothers Racing	Ford	20.439	92.646
24	33	Harry Gant	Leo Jackson Motorsports	Chevrolet	20.442	92.633
25	26	Brett Bodine	King Racing	Ford	20.452	92.588
26	41	Joe Nemechek (R)	Larry Hedrick Motorsports	Chevrolet	20.460	92.551
27	32	Dick Trickle	Active Motorsports	Chevrolet	20.461	92.547
28	27	Jimmy Spencer	Junior Johnson & Associates	Ford	20.463	92.538
29	40	Bobby Hamilton	SABCO Racing	Pontiac	20.478	92.470
30	29	Steve Grissom (R)	Diamond Ridge Motorsports	Chevrolet	20.509	92.330
31	30	Michael Waltrip	Bahari Racing	Pontiac	20.526	92.254
32	52	Brad Teague	Jimmy Means Racing	Ford	20.561	92.097
33	75	Todd Bodine	Butch Mock Motorsports	Ford	20.803	91.025
34	77	Greg Sacks	U.S. Motorsports Inc.	Ford	20.823	90.938
Provisionals
35	1	Rick Mast	Precision Products Racing	Ford	21.095	89.765
36	90	Mike Wallace (R)	Donlavey Racing	Ford	21.100	89.744
Failed to qualify
37	71	Dave Marcis	Marcis Auto Racing	Chevrolet	-*	-*
38	20	Bobby Hillin Jr.	Moroso Racing	Ford	-*	-*
39	19	Loy Allen Jr. (R)	TriStar Motorsports	Ford	-*	-*
40	55	Tim Fedewa	RaDiUs Motorsports	Ford	-*	-*
41	98	Jeremy Mayfield (R)	Cale Yarborough Motorsports	Ford	-*	-*
Official first round qualifying results
Official starting lineup

== Race results ==
Fin	St	#	Driver	Team	Make	Laps	Led	Status	Pts	Winnings
1	7	2	Rusty Wallace	Penske Racing South	Ford	500	368	running	185	$69,125
2	20	3	Dale Earnhardt	Richard Childress Racing	Chevrolet	500	10	running	175	$42,400
3	10	11	Bill Elliott	Junior Johnson & Associates	Ford	500	0	running	165	$29,525
4	12	28	Kenny Wallace	Robert Yates Racing	Ford	500	0	running	160	$30,650
5	8	18	Dale Jarrett	Joe Gibbs Racing	Chevrolet	500	0	running	155	$26,775
6	14	25	Ken Schrader	Hendrick Motorsports	Chevrolet	500	0	running	150	$18,775
7	9	4	Sterling Marlin	Morgan–McClure Motorsports	Chevrolet	499	0	running	146	$20,075
8	24	33	Harry Gant	Leo Jackson Motorsports	Chevrolet	499	0	running	142	$16,975
9	1	16	Ted Musgrave	Roush Racing	Ford	499	0	running	138	$21,275
10	11	17	Darrell Waltrip	Darrell Waltrip Motorsports	Chevrolet	499	0	running	134	$17,825
11	6	24	Jeff Gordon	Hendrick Motorsports	Chevrolet	499	14	running	135	$19,810
12	30	29	Steve Grissom (R)	Diamond Ridge Motorsports	Chevrolet	498	0	running	127	$13,025
13	29	40	Bobby Hamilton	SABCO Racing	Pontiac	498	0	running	124	$13,725
14	17	5	Terry Labonte	Hendrick Motorsports	Chevrolet	498	0	running	121	$16,525
15	23	21	Morgan Shepherd	Wood Brothers Racing	Ford	497	18	running	123	$16,775
16	5	6	Mark Martin	Roush Racing	Ford	496	0	running	115	$18,425
17	19	12	Derrike Cope	Bobby Allison Motorsports	Ford	495	0	running	112	$13,225
18	2	7	Geoff Bodine	Geoff Bodine Racing	Ford	494	56	running	114	$14,630
19	31	30	Michael Waltrip	Bahari Racing	Pontiac	492	1	running	111	$11,975
20	28	27	Jimmy Spencer	Junior Johnson & Associates	Ford	492	1	running	108	$8,425
21	4	43	John Andretti (R)	Petty Enterprises	Pontiac	492	0	running	100	$8,075
22	26	41	Joe Nemechek (R)	Larry Hedrick Motorsports	Chevrolet	491	0	running	97	$7,375
23	21	23	Hut Stricklin	Travis Carter Enterprises	Ford	491	21	running	99	$7,225
24	16	42	Kyle Petty	SABCO Racing	Pontiac	491	0	running	91	$15,875
25	13	10	Ricky Rudd	Rudd Performance Motorsports	Ford	490	0	running	88	$10,975
26	34	77	Greg Sacks	U.S. Motorsports Inc.	Ford	486	0	running	85	$6,775
27	32	52	Brad Teague	Jimmy Means Racing	Ford	476	0	running	82	$4,625
28	36	90	Mike Wallace (R)	Donlavey Racing	Ford	450	0	running	79	$6,525
29	35	1	Rick Mast	Precision Products Racing	Ford	388	0	crash	76	$10,425
30	25	26	Brett Bodine	King Racing	Ford	381	0	engine	73	$9,875
31	22	22	Bobby Labonte	Bill Davis Racing	Pontiac	313	0	running	70	$8,375
32	27	32	Dick Trickle	Active Motorsports	Chevrolet	232	0	rear end	67	$4,375
33	33	75	Todd Bodine	Butch Mock Motorsports	Ford	132	0	crash	64	$4,875
34	15	15	Lake Speed	Bud Moore Engineering	Ford	89	11	crash	66	$14,375
35	18	31	Ward Burton (R)	A.G. Dillard Motorsports	Chevrolet	67	0	overheating	58	$4,375
36	3	8	Jeff Burton (R)	Stavola Brothers Racing	Ford	36	0	engine	55	$10,375
Official race results

== Standings after the race ==
Drivers' Championship standings

	Pos	Driver	Points
	1	Dale Earnhardt	3,970
	2	Rusty Wallace	3,753 (-217)
	3	Mark Martin	3,543 (-427)
1	4	Ken Schrader	3,454 (–516)
1	5	Ricky Rudd	3,407 (–563)
	6	Morgan Shepherd	3,334 (–636)
	7	Jeff Gordon	3,186 (–784)
1	8	Bill Elliott	3,131 (–839)
1	9	Darrell Waltrip	3,093 (–877)
1	10	Terry Labonte	3,073 (–897)
Official driver's standings

- Note: Only the first 10 positions are included for the driver standings.

Previous race: 1994 SplitFire Spark Plug 500	NASCAR Winston Cup Series; 1994 season	Next race: 1994 Tyson Holly Farms 400
