= 1994 NASCAR Winston Cup Series =

American motorsport season

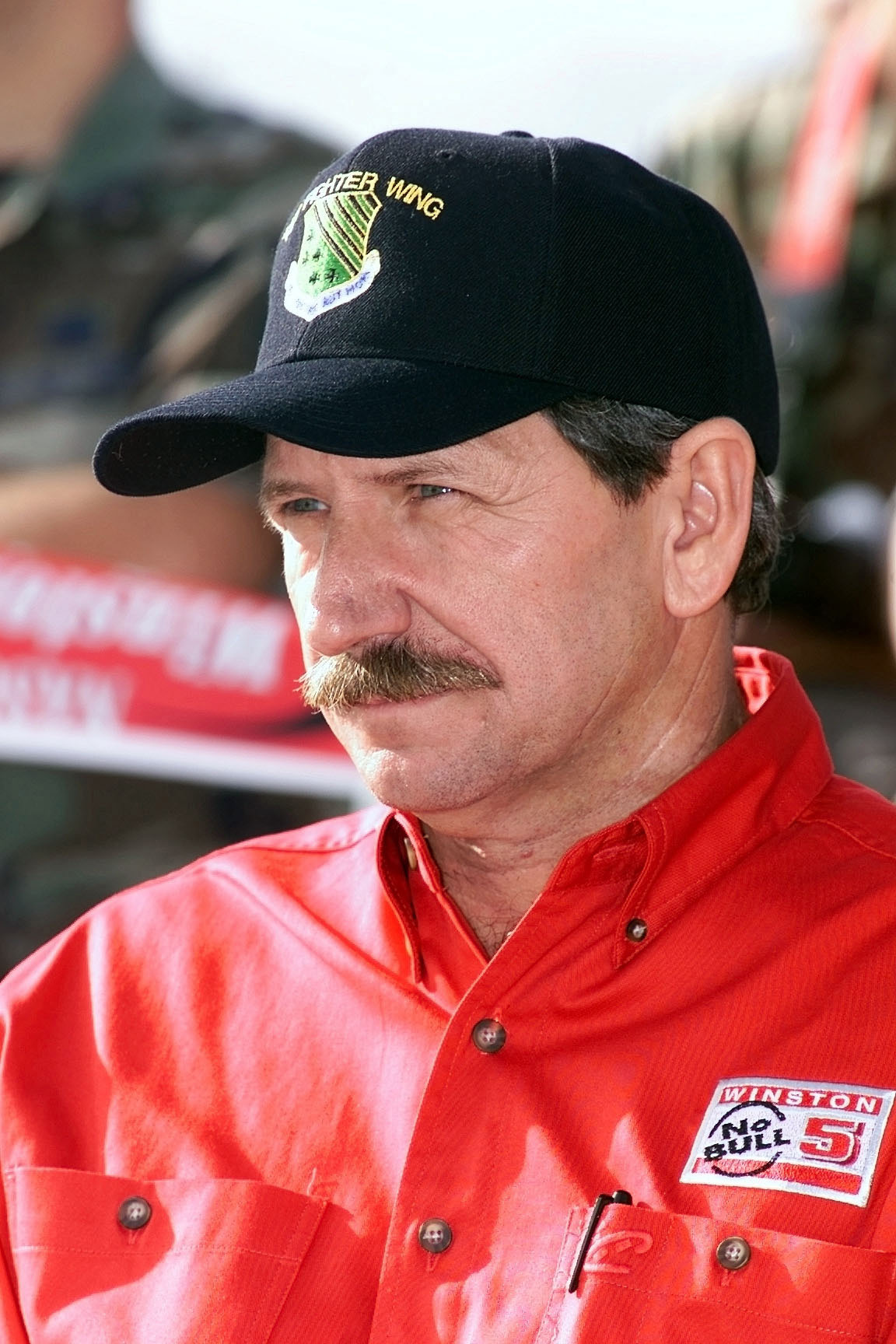
Dale Earnhardt tied Richard Petty's seven championships.

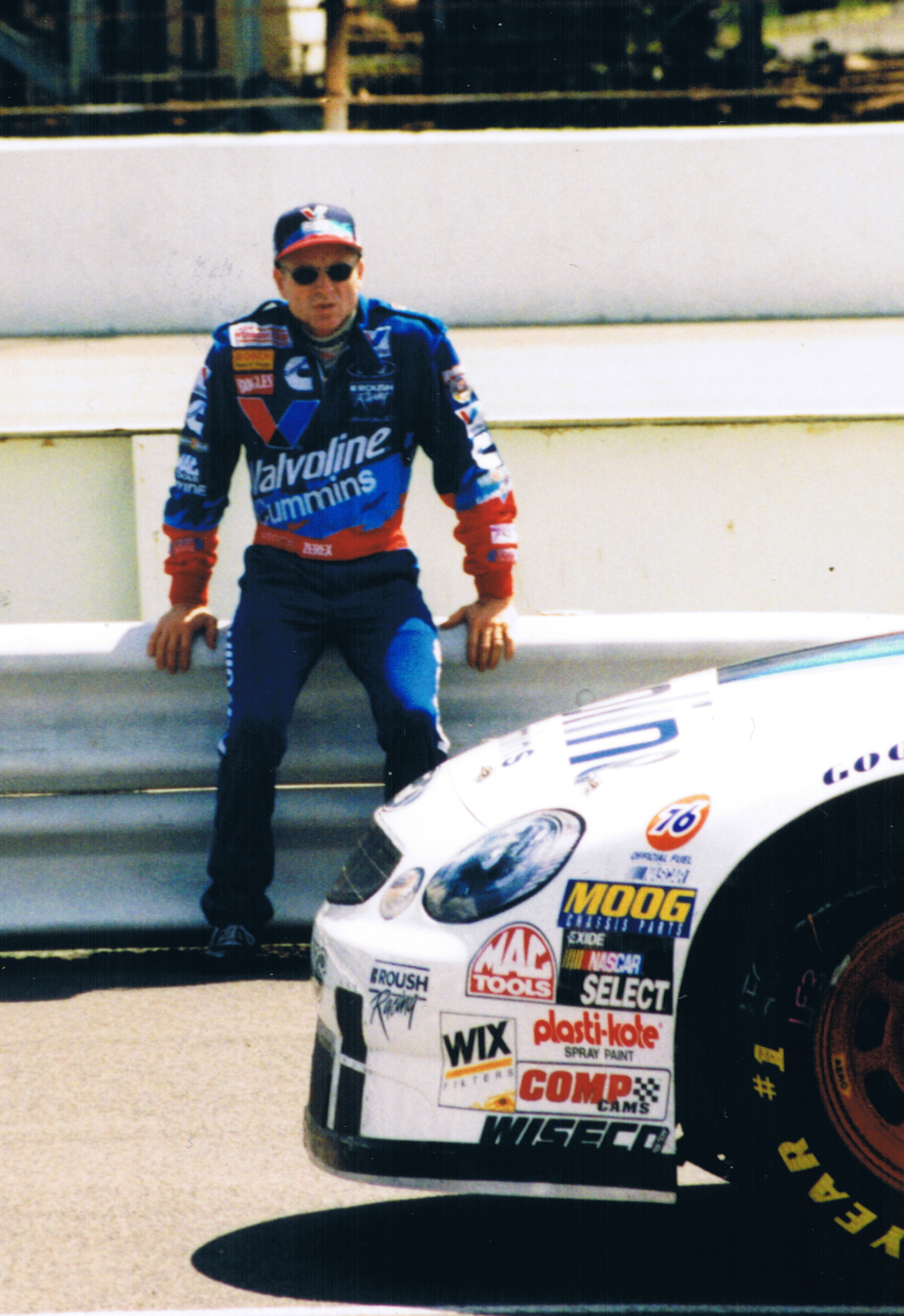
Mark Martin finished second to Earnhardt for the second time in five years, 444 points behind.

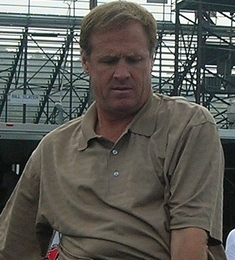
Rusty Wallace finished third in the championship.

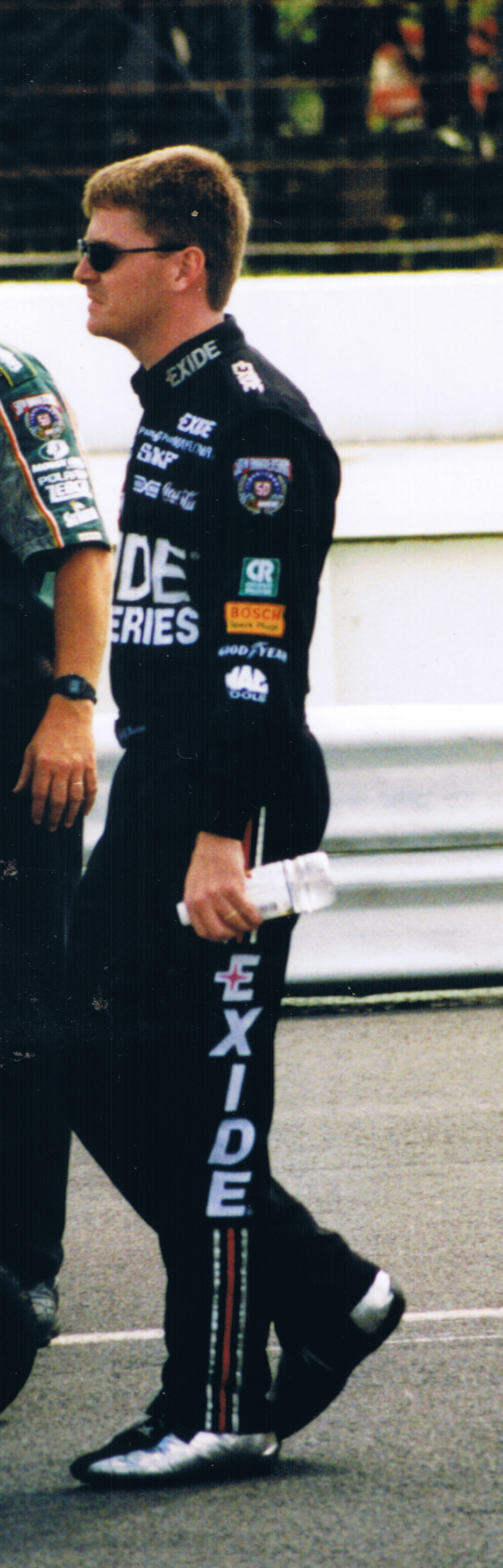
Jeff Burton, the 1994 NASCAR Rookie of the Year.

The 1994 NASCAR Winston Cup Series was the 46th season of NASCAR professional stock car racing in the United States and the 23rd modern-era Cup series. The season began on Sunday, February 20, and ended on Sunday, November 13. Dale Earnhardt of Richard Childress Racing was crowned champion at season's end, winning consecutive Winston Cups for the third time in his career and tying Richard Petty for the record of most top-level NASCAR championships with seven. It was also the 7th and final NASCAR Winston Cup Series Championship for Dale Earnhardt before his death 7 years later in 2001, this was also the final season for 18-time Winston Cup winner Harry Gant.

One of the highlights of the season occurred on August 6, when the NASCAR Winston Cup Series made a highly publicized first visit to the Indianapolis Motor Speedway for the inaugural Brickyard 400. This season also marked the end of the second of two tire wars, as Hoosier left NASCAR after the season-ending Atlanta race, leaving Goodyear as the series' exclusive tire distributor.

The season was marred with tragedy, as Neil Bonnett and Rodney Orr were killed in separate practice crashes prior to the Daytona 500 and in August at Michigan International Speedway when Ernie Irvan suffered near fatal injuries due to a practice crash.

== Teams and drivers ==
=== Complete schedule ===
Manufacturer	Team	Tires	No.	Race driver	Crew chief
Chevrolet	Active Motorsports	G	32	Dick Trickle	Mike Hillman
Chevrolet	A. G. Dillard Motorsports	H	31	Ward Burton (R)	Philippe Lopez
Chevrolet	Darrell Waltrip Motorsports	H later G	17	Darrell Waltrip	Pete Peterson
Chevrolet	Diamond Ridge Motorsports	G	29	Steve Grissom (R)	Bryant Frazier
Chevrolet	Hendrick Motorsports	G	5	Terry Labonte	Gary DeHart
Chevrolet	Hendrick Motorsports	G	24	Jeff Gordon	Ray Evernham
Chevrolet	Hendrick Motorsports	G	25	Ken Schrader	Ken Howes
Chevrolet	Joe Gibbs Racing	G	18	Dale Jarrett	Jimmy Makar
Chevrolet	Larry Hedrick Motorsports	H later G	41	Joe Nemechek (R)	Doug Richert
Chevrolet	Leo Jackson Motorsports	H later G	33	Harry Gant	Charley Pressley
Chevrolet	Marcis Auto Racing	G	71	Dave Marcis	Bob Marcis
Chevrolet	Morgan–McClure Motorsports	G	4	Sterling Marlin	Tony Glover
Chevrolet	Richard Childress Racing	G	3	Dale Earnhardt	Andy Petree
Ford	Bobby Allison Motorsports	G	12	Chuck Bown 13	Jimmy Fennig
Ford	Bobby Allison Motorsports	G	12	Tim Steele 6	Jimmy Fennig
Ford	Bobby Allison Motorsports	G	12	Derrike Cope 11	Jimmy Fennig
Ford	Bud Moore Engineering	G	15	Lake Speed	Donnie Wingo
Ford	Butch Mock Motorsports	G	75	Todd Bodine	Butch Mock
Ford	Cale Yarborough Motorsports	G	98	Derrike Cope 16	Ken Glen
Ford	Cale Yarborough Motorsports	G	98	Jeremy Mayfield (R) 15	Ken Glen
Ford	Donlavey Racing	G	90	Bobby Hillin Jr. 3	Freddy Fryar
Ford	Donlavey Racing	G	90	Mike Wallace 28	Freddy Fryar
Ford	Geoff Bodine Racing	H	7	Geoff Bodine	Paul Andrews
Ford	Junior Johnson & Associates	G	11	Bill Elliott	Mike Beam
Ford	Junior Johnson & Associates	G	27	Jimmy Spencer 30	Mike Hill
Ford	Junior Johnson & Associates	G	27	Tommy Kendall 1	Mike Hill
Ford	King Racing	G	26	Brett Bodine	Donnie Richeson
Ford	Penske Racing	G	2	Rusty Wallace	Buddy Parrott
Ford	Precision Products Racing	H later G	1	Rick Mast	Kevin Hamlin
Ford	Robert Yates Racing	G	28	Ernie Irvan 21	Larry McReynolds
Ford	Robert Yates Racing	G	28	Kenny Wallace 9	Larry McReynolds
Ford	Roush Racing	G	6	Mark Martin	Steve Hmiel
Ford	Roush Racing	G	16	Ted Musgrave	Howard Comstock
Ford	Rudd Performance Motorsports	G	10	Ricky Rudd	Bill Ingle
Ford	Smokin' Joe's Racing	G	23	Hut Stricklin	Travis Carter
Ford	Stavola Brothers Racing	H	8	Jeff Burton (R)	Buddy Barnes
Ford	Tri-Star Motorsports	H	19	Loy Allen Jr. (R)	Dennis Conner
Ford	U.S. Racing	H	77	Greg Sacks	Tony Furr
Ford	Wood Brothers Racing	G	21	Morgan Shepherd	Eddie Wood
Pontiac	Bahari Racing	G	30	Michael Waltrip	Doug Hewitt
Pontiac	Bill Davis Racing	G	22	Bobby Labonte	Chris Hussey
Pontiac	Petty Enterprises	G	43	Wally Dallenbach Jr. 20	Robbie Loomis
Pontiac	Petty Enterprises	G	43	John Andretti 11 (R)	Robbie Loomis
Pontiac	SABCO Racing	G	40	Bobby Hamilton	Jeff Hammond
Pontiac	SABCO Racing	G	42	Kyle Petty	Jim Long

=== Limited schedule ===
Manufacturer	Team	No.	Race driver	Crew chief	Round(s)
Chevrolet	Butch Lietzinger Racing	03	Butch Lietzinger		1
Chevrolet	Diamond Ridge Motorsports	9	John Krebs		1
Chevrolet	Gilliland Racing	36	Butch Gilliland		1
Chevrolet	Gilliland Racing	36	Rich Woodland Jr.		1
Chevrolet	Gilliland Racing	86W	Butch Gilliland		1
Chevrolet	Gilliland Racing	86W	Rich Woodland Jr.		1
Chevrolet	Hagan Racing	14	John Andretti (R)		19
Chevrolet	Hagan Racing	14	Phil Parsons		1
Chevrolet	Hagan Racing	14	Randy MacDonald		1
Chevrolet	Linro Motorsports	13	Kerry Teague		1
Chevrolet	Phoenix Racing	51	Neil Bonnett	Tony Eury Sr. 1 Johnny Allen 7	1
Chevrolet	Phoenix Racing	51	Jeff Purvis	Tony Eury Sr. 1 Johnny Allen 7	7
Chevrolet	Spears Motorsports	76	Ron Hornaday Jr.		3
Chevrolet	Team 34	34	Mike McLaughlin		2
Chevrolet	Venturini Motorsports	35	Bill Venturini		1
Ford	Brevak Racing	34	Bob Brevak		5
Ford	Charles Hardy Racing	44	Bobby Hillin Jr.	Tony Gibson	5
Ford	Charles Hardy Racing	44	Kenny Wallace	Tony Gibson	1
Ford	Charles Hardy Racing	44	Jimmy Hensley	Tony Gibson	1
Ford	FILMAR Racing	81	Kenny Wallace	Gil Martin	1
Ford	H.L. Waters Racing	0	Delma Cowart		6
Ford	Kranefuss-Haas Racing	07	Robby Gordon	Tim Brewer	1
Ford	Kranefuss-Haas Racing	07	Geoff Brabham	Tim Brewer	1
Ford	Melling Racing	9	Joe Ruttman	Peter Sospenzo	1
Ford	Melling Racing	9	Rich Bickle	Peter Sospenzo	12
Ford	Melling Racing	9	Phil Parsons	Peter Sospenzo	5
Ford	Means Racing	52	Brad Teague		18
Ford	Means Racing	52	Mike Skinner		3
Ford	Means Racing	52	Kirk Shelmerdine		1
Ford	Means Racing	52	Scott Gaylord		1
Ford	Means Racing	52	Bob Keselowski		1
Ford	Means Racing	52	Gary Bradberry		1
Ford	Means Racing	53	Kirk Shelmerdine		1
Ford	Means Racing	53	Brad Teague		1
Ford	Moroso Racing	20	Buddy Baker		2
Ford	Moroso Racing	20	Randy LaJoie		3
Ford	Moroso Racing	20	Bobby Hillin Jr.		4
Ford	Moroso Racing	20	Jimmy Hensley		1
Ford	Venable Racing	20	Gary Collins		1
Ford	Orr Motorsports	37	Rodney Orr		1
Ford	Petty Brothers Racing	53	Ritchie Petty	Maurice Petty	4
Ford	Sadler Brothers Racing	95	Jeremy Mayfield	Lee Leslie	7
Ford	Sadler Brothers Racing	95	Ben Hess	Lee Leslie	3
Ford	Sadler Brothers Racing	95	Jeff Green	Lee Leslie	3
Ford	Stroppe Motorsports	38	P. J. Jones		1
Ford	Taylor Racing	02	T.W. Taylor	Jeff Buckner	1
Ford	Taylor Racing	02	Curtis Markham	Jeff Buckner	4
Ford	Taylor Racing	02	Ronnie Sanders	Jeff Buckner	1
Ford	Taylor Racing	02	Jeremy Mayfield	Jeff Buckner	4
Ford	Taylor Racing	02	Derrike Cope	Jeff Buckner	3
Ford	Taylor Racing	02	Jeff Purvis	Jeff Buckner	1
Ford	Taylor Racing	02	Brad Noffsinger	Jeff Buckner	3
Ford	Taylor Racing	02	Randy LaJoie	Jeff Buckner	1
Ford	Ultra Motorsports	06	P. J. Jones		1
Ford	U.S. Racing	88	Davy Jones		1
Ford	U.S. Racing	88	P. J. Jones		1
Ford	Whitcomb Racing	51	Dirk Stephens		1
Oldsmobile	J&J Racing	99	Phil Parsons		1
Pontiac	Bailey Racing	36	H. B. Bailey		3

== Schedule ==
No.	Race title	Track	Date
	Busch Clash	Daytona International Speedway, Daytona Beach	February 13
	Gatorade Twin 125s	Daytona International Speedway, Daytona Beach	February 17
1	Daytona 500	Daytona International Speedway, Daytona Beach	February 20
2	Goodwrench 500	North Carolina Motor Speedway, Rockingham	February 27
3	Pontiac Excitement 400	Richmond International Raceway, Richmond	March 6
4	Purolator 500	Atlanta Motor Speedway, Hampton	March 13
5	TranSouth Financial 400	Darlington Raceway, Darlington	March 27
6	Food City 500	Bristol International Raceway, Bristol	April 10
7	First Union 400	North Wilkesboro Speedway, North Wilkesboro	April 17
8	Hanes 500	Martinsville Speedway, Ridgeway	April 24
9	Winston Select 500	Talladega Superspeedway, Talladega	May 1
10	Save Mart Supermarkets 300	Sears Point Raceway, Sonoma	May 15
	Winston Open	Charlotte Motor Speedway, Concord	May 21
	The Winston Select	Charlotte Motor Speedway, Concord	May 21
11	Coca-Cola 600	Charlotte Motor Speedway, Concord	May 29
12	Budweiser 500	Dover Downs International Speedway, Dover	June 5
13	UAW-GM Teamwork 500	Pocono International Raceway, Long Pond	June 12
14	Miller Genuine Draft 400	Michigan International Speedway, Brooklyn	June 19
15	Pepsi 400	Daytona International Speedway, Daytona Beach	July 2
16	Slick 50 300	New Hampshire International Speedway, Loudon	July 10
17	Miller Genuine Draft 500	Pocono International Raceway, Long Pond	July 17
18	DieHard 500	Talladega Superspeedway, Talladega	July 24
19	Brickyard 400	Indianapolis Motor Speedway, Speedway	August 6
20	The Bud at The Glen	Watkins Glen International, Watkins Glen	August 14
21	GM Goodwrench Dealers 400	Michigan International Speedway, Brooklyn	August 21
22	Goody's 500	Bristol International Raceway, Bristol	August 27
23	Mountain Dew Southern 500	Darlington Raceway, Darlington	September 4
24	Miller Genuine Draft 400	Richmond International Raceway, Richmond	September 10
25	SplitFire Spark Plug 500	Dover Downs International Speedway, Dover	September 18
26	Goody's 500	Martinsville Speedway, Ridgeway	September 25
27	Tyson Holly Farms 400	North Wilkesboro Speedway, North Wilkesboro	October 2
28	Mello Yello 500	Charlotte Motor Speedway, Concord	October 9
29	AC Delco 500	North Carolina Motor Speedway, Rockingham	October 23
30	Slick 50 500	Phoenix International Raceway, Phoenix	October 30
31	Hooters 500	Atlanta Motor Speedway, Hampton	November 13

== Races ==
No.	Race	Pole position	Most laps led	Winning driver	Manufacturer
	Busch Clash	Ken Schrader	Dale Earnhardt	Jeff Gordon	Chevrolet
	Gatorade Twin 125 #1	Loy Allen Jr.	Ernie Irvan	Ernie Irvan	Ford
	Gatorade Twin 125 #2	Dale Earnhardt	Dale Earnhardt	Dale Earnhardt	Chevrolet
1	Daytona 500	Loy Allen Jr.	Ernie Irvan	Sterling Marlin	Chevrolet
2	Goodwrench 500	Geoff Bodine	Rusty Wallace	Rusty Wallace	Ford
3	Pontiac Excitement 400	Ted Musgrave	Ernie Irvan	Ernie Irvan	Ford
4	Purolator 500	Loy Allen Jr.	Ernie Irvan	Ernie Irvan	Ford
5	TranSouth Financial 400	Bill Elliott	Dale Earnhardt	Dale Earnhardt	Chevrolet
6	Food City 500	Chuck Bown	Dale Earnhardt	Dale Earnhardt	Chevrolet
7	First Union 400	Ernie Irvan	Ernie Irvan	Terry Labonte	Chevrolet
8	Hanes 500	Rusty Wallace	Rusty Wallace	Rusty Wallace	Ford
9	Winston Select 500	Ernie Irvan	Ernie Irvan	Dale Earnhardt	Chevrolet
10	Save Mart Supermarkets 300	Ernie Irvan	Ernie Irvan	Ernie Irvan	Ford
	Winston Open	Joe Nemechek	Joe Nemechek	Jeff Gordon	Chevrolet
	The Winston Select	Rusty Wallace	Ernie Irvan	Geoff Bodine	Ford
11	Coca-Cola 600	Jeff Gordon	Rusty Wallace	Jeff Gordon	Chevrolet
12	Budweiser 500	Ernie Irvan	Ernie Irvan	Rusty Wallace	Ford
13	UAW-GM Teamwork 500	Rusty Wallace	Rusty Wallace	Rusty Wallace	Ford
14	Miller Genuine Draft 400	Loy Allen Jr.	Rusty Wallace	Rusty Wallace	Ford
15	Pepsi 400	Dale Earnhardt	Ernie Irvan	Jimmy Spencer	Ford
16	Slick 50 300	Ernie Irvan	Ernie Irvan	Ricky Rudd	Ford
17	Miller Genuine Draft 500	Geoff Bodine	Geoff Bodine	Geoff Bodine	Ford
18	DieHard 500	Dale Earnhardt	Ernie Irvan	Jimmy Spencer	Ford
19	Brickyard 400	Rick Mast	Jeff Gordon	Jeff Gordon	Chevrolet
20	The Bud at The Glen	Mark Martin	Mark Martin	Mark Martin	Ford
21	GM Goodwrench Dealer 400	Geoff Bodine	Geoff Bodine	Geoff Bodine	Ford
22	Goody's 500	Harry Gant	Geoff Bodine	Rusty Wallace	Ford
23	Mountain Dew Southern 500	Geoff Bodine	Ken Schrader	Bill Elliott	Ford
24	Miller Genuine Draft 400	Ted Musgrave	Terry Labonte	Terry Labonte	Chevrolet
25	SplitFire Spark Plug 500	Geoff Bodine	Geoff Bodine	Rusty Wallace	Ford
26	Goody's 500	Ted Musgrave	Rusty Wallace	Rusty Wallace	Ford
27	Tyson Holly Farms 400	Jimmy Spencer	Geoff Bodine	Geoff Bodine	Ford
28	Mello Yello 500	Ward Burton	Geoff Bodine	Dale Jarrett	Chevrolet
29	AC Delco 500	Ricky Rudd	Dale Earnhardt	Dale Earnhardt	Chevrolet
30	Slick 50 500	Sterling Marlin	Terry Labonte	Terry Labonte	Chevrolet
31	Hooters 500	Greg Sacks	Mark Martin	Mark Martin	Ford

=== Busch Clash ===
The Busch Clash was held February 13 at Daytona International Speedway. Ken Schrader drew for the pole.

Top ten results

1. #24 - Jeff Gordon
2. #26 - Brett Bodine
3. #3 - Dale Earnhardt
4. #28 - Ernie Irvan
5. #6 - Mark Martin
6. #42 - Kyle Petty
7. #11 - Bill Elliott
8. #25 - Ken Schrader
9. #2 - Rusty Wallace
10. #33 - Harry Gant
- Two days earlier, during Daytona 500 practice, Neil Bonnett died of massive head injuries after losing control of his car in turn 3 and hit the wall head-on.
- The day after this race, Rodney Orr died of massive head and chest injuries after his car slammed into the outside retaining wall and catch fence in turn 2, with the caution light piercing through the roof.

=== Gatorade 125s ===
The Gatorade 125s, the qualifying races for the Daytona 500, were held February 17 at Daytona International Speedway.

Race one: top ten results

1. #28 - Ernie Irvan
2. #2 - Rusty Wallace
3. #6 - Mark Martin
4. #5 - Terry Labonte
5. #75 - Todd Bodine
6. #25 - Ken Schrader
7. #14 - John Andretti
8. #97 - Chad Little
9. #54 - Robert Pressley
10. #27 - Jimmy Spencer

Race two: top ten results

1. #3 - Dale Earnhardt
2. #4 - Sterling Marlin
3. #24 - Jeff Gordon
4. #11 - Bill Elliott
5. #26 - Brett Bodine
6. #21 - Morgan Shepherd
7. #30 - Michael Waltrip
8. #98 - Derrike Cope
9. #43 - Wally Dallenbach Jr.
10. #10 - Ricky Rudd

=== Daytona 500 ===
The 36th Daytona 500 was held on February 20 in Daytona International Speedway. Rookie Loy Allen Jr. won the pole.

Top ten results

1. #4 - Sterling Marlin*
2. #28 - Ernie Irvan
3. #5 - Terry Labonte
4. #24 - Jeff Gordon
5. #21 - Morgan Shepherd
6. #77 - Greg Sacks
7. #3 - Dale Earnhardt
8. #10 - Ricky Rudd
9. #11 - Bill Elliott
10. #25 - Ken Schrader

Failed to qualify: #89 - Jim Sauter, #41 - Joe Nemechek, #52 - Brad Teague, #45 - Rich Bickle, #34 - Bob Brevak, #02 - T. W. Taylor, #0 - Delma Cowart, #48 - Trevor Boys, #47 - Billy Standridge, #56 - Jerry Hill, #74 - Kerry Teague, #29 - Steve Grissom, #73 - Phil Barkdoll, #20 - Buddy Baker, #53 - Ritchie Petty, #61 - Rick Carelli, #31 - Ward Burton

- This was Marlin's first career Cup Series victory, becoming the 5th driver in history to do score it in the Daytona 500.
- Marlin's first victory came in his 279th start, which included eight 2nd-place finishes, tying Bill Elliott for most runner-up finishes before their first victory.
- Despite not leading a single lap, Loy Allen Jr. became the first rookie to win the pole for the Daytona 500.
- This was the first points Cup race when cars were mandated to have roof flaps after multiple violent flips at both Daytona & Talladega in 1993.

=== Goodwrench 500 ===
The Goodwrench 500 was held February 27 at North Carolina Speedway. Geoff Bodine was on the pole.

Top ten results

1. #2 - Rusty Wallace*
2. #4 - Sterling Marlin
3. #1 - Rick Mast
4. #6 - Mark Martin, -1 lap
5. #28 - Ernie Irvan, -1 lap
6. #26 - Brett Bodine, -1 lap
7. #3 - Dale Earnhardt, -1 lap
8. #42 - Kyle Petty, -2 laps
9. #25 - Ken Schrader, -3 laps
10. #30 - Michael Waltrip, -3 laps

Failed to qualify: #31 - Ward Burton, #48 - James Hylton, #99 - Danny Sullivan, #61 - Rick Carelli, #95 - Jeremy Mayfield, #48 - Jerry Hill, #02 - T. W. Taylor

- This was Wallace's third consecutive Rockingham victory, joining Richard Petty as the only drivers to accomplish this feat.

=== Pontiac Excitement 400 ===
The Pontiac Excitement 400 was held March 6 at Richmond International Raceway. Ted Musgrave won the pole.

Top ten results

1. #28 - Ernie Irvan
2. #2 - Rusty Wallace*
3. #24 - Jeff Gordon
4. #3 - Dale Earnhardt
5. #42 - Kyle Petty
6. #6 - Mark Martin
7. #1 - Rick Mast
8. #26 - Brett Bodine
9. #5 - Terry Labonte*
10. #18 - Dale Jarrett, -1 lap

Failed to qualify: #19 - Loy Allen Jr., #45 - Rich Bickle, #71 - Dave Marcis*, #43 - Wally Dallenbach Jr.*, #23 - Hut Stricklin, #47 - Billy Standridge, #61 - Rick Carelli, #02 - T. W. Taylor, #66 - Mike Wallace

- Dave Marcis served as a broadcaster for TBS Sports after failing to qualify.
- This would be Rusty Wallace's 9th consecutive top-2 finish on a short track.
- Terry Labonte started 37th (last) as he withdrew his time & took a champions provisional to allow Ricky Rudd to qualify on his time as Rudd's time would not have been fast enough and his new team had no owners points from the previous season and he would not have been eligible for a provisional. Rudd finished 2 laps down in 18th.
- Wally Dallenbach Jr. failing to qualify would be the first DNQ for Petty Enterprises since 1989.

=== Purolator 500 ===
The Purolator 500 was held March 13 at Atlanta Motor Speedway. Loy Allen Jr. won the pole after failing to qualify at the previous race.

Top ten results

1. #28 - Ernie Irvan
2. #21 - Morgan Shepherd
3. #17 - Darrell Waltrip
4. #8 - Jeff Burton*
5. #6 - Mark Martin, -1 lap
6. #15 - Lake Speed, -1 lap
7. #77 - Greg Sacks, -1 lap
8. #24 - Jeff Gordon, -2 laps
9. #10 - Ricky Rudd, -2 laps
10. #27 - Jimmy Spencer, -2 laps

Failed to qualify: #43 - Wally Dallenbach Jr., #20 - Buddy Baker, #61 - Rick Carelli, #47 - Billy Standridge, #89 - Jim Sauter, #80 - Jimmy Horton, #99 - Danny Sullivan, #95 - Jeremy Mayfield

- First career top 5 for Jeff Burton.

=== TranSouth Financial 400 ===
The TranSouth Financial 400 was held March 27 at Darlington Raceway. Bill Elliott won the pole.

Top ten results

1. #3 - Dale Earnhardt
2. #6 - Mark Martin
3. #11 - Bill Elliott
4. #18 - Dale Jarrett
5. #15 - Lake Speed
6. #28 - Ernie Irvan
7. #25 - Ken Schrader
8. #33 - Harry Gant, -1 lap
9. #10 - Ricky Rudd, -1 lap
10. #16 - Ted Musgrave, -1 lap

Failed to qualify: #19 - Loy Allen Jr., #61 - Rick Carelli, #47 - Billy Standridge, #02 - Curtis Markham, #57 - Bob Schacht, #84 - Norm Benning, #36 - H. B. Bailey, #59 - Andy Belmont

=== Food City 500 ===
The Food City 500 was held April 10 at Bristol International Raceway. Chuck Bown won the pole.

Top ten results

1. #3 - Dale Earnhardt*
2. #25 - Ken Schrader
3. #15 - Lake Speed
4. #7 - Geoff Bodine, -1 lap
5. #30 - Michael Waltrip, -3 laps
6. #22 - Bobby Labonte, -4 laps
7. #2 - Rusty Wallace*, -6 laps
8. #4 - Sterling Marlin, -9 laps
9. #40 - Bobby Hamilton, -12 laps
10. #71 - Dave Marcis*, -14 laps

Failed to qualify: #14 - John Andretti, #55 - Jimmy Hensley, #19 - Loy Allen Jr., #95 - Jeremy Mayfield, #52 - Brad Teague

- Several accidents (including one during green flag pit stops) caused the big gaps among the top ten cars.
- This was Dave Marcis' final Top 10 finish.
- This was the final time in his career that Dale Earnhardt would win back-to-back Cup races.
- Rusty Wallace's 7th-place finish ended his streak of 12 consecutive top-5 finishes on short tracks, but his streak of consecutive top-10 finishes on short tracks would continue at 14.

=== First Union 400 ===
The First Union 400 was held April 17 at North Wilkesboro Speedway. Ernie Irvan won the pole.

Top ten results

1. #5 - Terry Labonte*
2. #2 - Rusty Wallace
3. #28 - Ernie Irvan
4. #42 - Kyle Petty
5. #3 - Dale Earnhardt
6. #10 - Ricky Rudd
7. #7 - Geoff Bodine, -1 lap
8. #33 - Harry Gant, -1 lap
9. #25 - Ken Schrader, -2 laps
10. #1 - Rick Mast, -3 laps

Failed to qualify: #29 - Steve Grissom, #31 - Ward Burton, #9 - Rich Bickle, #41 - Joe Nemechek, #19 - Loy Allen Jr., #55 - Jimmy Hensley, #90 - Mike Wallace, #02 - Curtis Markham, #52 - Mike Skinner, #62 - Freddie Query

- This was Terry Labonte's first Cup Series victory since 1989, and his first for Hendrick Motorsports.

=== Hanes 500 ===
The Hanes 500 was held April 24 at Martinsville Speedway. Rusty Wallace won the pole.

Top ten results

1. #2 - Rusty Wallace
2. #28 - Ernie Irvan
3. #6 - Mark Martin
4. #17 - Darrell Waltrip
5. #21 - Morgan Shepherd
6. #75 - Todd Bodine
7. #12 - Chuck Bown
8. #1 - Rick Mast, -1 lap
9. #11 - Bill Elliott, -1 lap
10. #16 - Ted Musgrave, -1 lap

Failed to qualify: #43 - Wally Dallenbach Jr., #90 - Mike Wallace, #71 - Dave Marcis, #19 - Loy Allen Jr., #02 - Curtis Markham, #89 - Jim Bown, #52 - Mike Skinner, #33 - Harry Gant*

- This would be Harry Gant's last career DNQ.

=== Winston Select 500 ===
The Winston Select 500 was held May 1 at Talladega Superspeedway. Ernie Irvan won the pole.

Top ten results

1. #3 - Dale Earnhardt*
2. #28 - Ernie Irvan
3. #30 - Michael Waltrip
4. #27 - Jimmy Spencer
5. #25 - Ken Schrader
6. #77 - Greg Sacks
7. #15 - Lake Speed
8. #4 - Sterling Marlin
9. #21 - Morgan Shepherd
10. #29 - Steve Grissom

Failed to qualify: #31 - Ward Burton, #9 - Rich Bickle, #80 - Jimmy Horton, #89 - Jim Sauter, #0 - Delma Cowart, #53 - Ritchie Petty, #02 - Ronnie Sanders

- A scary crash occurred just after halfway when Mark Martin's #6 car, without brakes, hit the inside retaining wall and crashed through two guardrails, through a catchfence and into a third guardrail. He was only slightly injured.
- After the race, Earnhardt dedicated his victory to Formula One driver Ayrton Senna, who died earlier in the day at the San Marino Grand Prix.

=== Save Mart Supermarkets 300 ===
The Save Mart Supermarkets 300 was held May 15 at Sears Point Raceway. Ernie Irvan won the pole.

Top ten results

1. #28 - Ernie Irvan*
2. #7 - Geoff Bodine
3. #3 - Dale Earnhardt
4. #43 - Wally Dallenbach Jr.
5. #2 - Rusty Wallace
6. #16 - Ted Musgrave
7. #21 - Morgan Shepherd
8. #6 - Mark Martin
9. #25 - Ken Schrader
10. #33 - Harry Gant

Failed to qualify: #52 - Scott Gaylord, #55 - Jimmy Hensley, #32 - Dick Trickle, #48w - Jack Sellers, #19 - Loy Allen Jr., #86w - Rich Woodland Jr.

- Ernie Irvan became the first driver to win a second time at Sonoma (he won this race previously in 1992).
- The race was marred by a violent crash between Derrike Cope and John Krebs, in which Krebs' #9 car went through a tire barrier, up and over an embankment, and flipped over several times. Krebs escaped with only minor injuries.

=== Coca-Cola 600 ===
The Coca-Cola 600 was held May 29 at Charlotte Motor Speedway. Jeff Gordon won the pole.

Top ten results

1. #24 - Jeff Gordon*
2. #2 - Rusty Wallace
3. #7 - Geoff Bodine
4. #18 - Dale Jarrett
5. #28 - Ernie Irvan
6. #10 - Ricky Rudd
7. #33 - Harry Gant, -1 lap
8. #75 - Todd Bodine, -2 laps
9. #3 - Dale Earnhardt, -3 laps
10. #30 - Michael Waltrip, -3 laps

Failed to qualify: #55 - Jimmy Hensley, #71 - Dave Marcis, #44 - Bobby Hillin Jr., #89 - Jim Sauter

- This was Jeff Gordon's first Winston Cup victory. The 22-year-old driver benefited from all the wrecks that day along with only taking 2 tires on his final pit stop to score his first victory.
- John Andretti became the first driver to run both the Indianapolis 500 and Coca-Cola 600 on the same day. Andretti finished 10th earlier that day at Indy, but fell out of the race on lap 220 at Charlotte, finishing 36th. In total, Andretti completed 830 miles.

=== Budweiser 500 ===
The Budweiser 500 was held June 5 at Dover Downs International Speedway. Ernie Irvan won the pole.

Top ten results

1. #2 - Rusty Wallace
2. #28 - Ernie Irvan
3. #25 - Ken Schrader
4. #6 - Mark Martin
5. #24 - Jeff Gordon
6. #17 - Darrell Waltrip, -1 lap
7. #30 - Michael Waltrip, -1 lap
8. #4 - Sterling Marlin, -2 laps
9. #23 - Hut Stricklin, -2 laps
10. #43 - Wally Dallenbach Jr., -3 laps

Failed to qualify: #84 - Norm Benning, #59 - Andy Belmont

=== UAW-GM Teamwork 500 ===
The UAW-GM Teamwork 500 was held June 12 at Pocono Raceway. Rusty Wallace won the pole.

Top ten results

1. #2 - Rusty Wallace
2. #3 - Dale Earnhardt
3. #25 - Ken Schrader
4. #21 - Morgan Shepherd
5. #6 - Mark Martin
6. #24 - Jeff Gordon
7. #28 - Ernie Irvan
8. #26 - Brett Bodine
9. #1 - Rick Mast
10. #11 - Bill Elliott

Failed to qualify: #47 - Billy Standridge, #59 - Andy Belmont

- Chuck Bown suffered a broken right wrist, fractured left ankle, and a concussion in a lap 63 crash with Sterling Marlin, and would sit out for the rest of the season.
- Bob Keselowski, father of 2012 Series champion Brad Keselowski, made his only career Cup Series start in this race, driving the #52 Ford for Jimmy Means. Keselowski would suffer a blown engine on lap 17, and finish 41st.

=== Miller Genuine Draft 400 ===
The Miller Genuine Draft 400 was held June 19 at Michigan International Speedway. Loy Allen Jr. was on the pole.

Top ten results

1. #2 - Rusty Wallace*
2. #3 - Dale Earnhardt
3. #6 - Mark Martin
4. #10 - Ricky Rudd
5. #21 - Morgan Shepherd
6. #25 - Ken Schrader
7. #41 - Joe Nemechek
8. #30 - Michael Waltrip
9. #16 - Ted Musgrave
10. #17 - Darrell Waltrip

Failed to qualify: #71 - Dave Marcis, #90 - Mike Wallace, #80 - Jimmy Horton, #52 - Brad Teague, #34 - Bob Brevak, #47 - Billy Standridge, #32 - Dick Trickle, #36 - H. B. Bailey, #61 - Rick Carelli, #43 - Wally Dallenbach Jr.

- As of today, Rusty Wallace is the only driver in NASCAR's Modern Era to score 3 consecutive victories in back-to-back seasons.
- Tim Steele replaced the injured Chuck Bown in the #12 for Bobby Allison Motorsports. Steele would crash out on lap 61 and finish 39th.

=== Pepsi 400 ===
The Pepsi 400 was held July 2 at Daytona International Speedway. Dale Earnhardt won the pole.

Top ten results

1. #27 - Jimmy Spencer*
2. #28 - Ernie Irvan
3. #3 - Dale Earnhardt
4. #6 - Mark Martin
5. #25 - Ken Schrader
6. #7 - Geoff Bodine
7. #75 - Todd Bodine
8. #24 - Jeff Gordon
9. #21 - Morgan Shepherd
10. #15 - Lake Speed

Failed to qualify: #52 - Brad Teague, #20 - Bobby Hillin Jr., #80 - Joe Ruttman, #43 - Wally Dallenbach Jr., #47 - Billy Standridge, #0 - Delma Cowart

- This was Jimmy Spencer first career Cup Series victory, passing Ernie Irvan on the last lap, and barely edging him out at the line by 0.008 seconds.

=== Slick 50 300 ===
The Slick 50 300 was held July 10 at New Hampshire International Speedway. Ernie Irvan was on the pole.

Top ten results

1. #10 - Ricky Rudd*
2. #3 - Dale Earnhardt
3. #2 - Rusty Wallace
4. #6 - Mark Martin
5. #75 - Todd Bodine
6. #21 - Morgan Shepherd*
7. #16 - Ted Musgrave
8. #42 - Kyle Petty
9. #1 - Rick Mast
10. #4 - Sterling Marlin

Failed to qualify: #19 - Loy Allen Jr., #43 - Wally Dallenbach Jr.*, #54 - Robert Pressley, #62 - Joe Bessey, #38 - Jamie Aube

- This was Ricky Rudd first victory driving for his own team, Rudd Performance Motorsports.
- This was the sixth and final time in 1994 that Petty Enterprises with driver Wally Dallenbach Jr. failed to qualify for a race.
- This would be the last time Wood Brothers Racing scored four consecutive top-10s in a Cup season until 2026, 32 years later.

=== Miller Genuine Draft 500 ===
The Miller Genuine Draft 500 was held July 17 at Pocono Raceway. Geoff Bodine won the pole.

Top ten results

1. #7 - Geoff Bodine*
2. #31 - Ward Burton
3. #41 - Joe Nemechek
4. #8 - Jeff Burton
5. #21 - Morgan Shepherd
6. #10 - Ricky Rudd
7. #3 - Dale Earnhardt
8. #24 - Jeff Gordon, -1 lap
9. #2 - Rusty Wallace, -1 lap
10. #18 - Dale Jarrett, -1 lap

Failed to qualify: #55 - Jimmy Hensley, #32 - Dick Trickle, #99 - Phil Parsons, #65 - Jerry O'Neil

- This was Geoff Bodine's first points race victory as an owner-driver, as he had won The Winston Select non-points race back in May.
- This was the first Cup series points victory for Hoosier Tires since the 1989 season.

=== DieHard 500 ===
The DieHard 500 was held July 24 at Talladega Superspeedway. Dale Earnhardt won the pole.

Top ten results

1. #27 - Jimmy Spencer
2. #11 - Bill Elliott
3. #28 - Ernie Irvan
4. #25 - Ken Schrader
5. #4 - Sterling Marlin
6. #6 - Mark Martin
7. #10 - Ricky Rudd
8. #43 - Wally Dallenbach Jr.
9. #44 - Kenny Wallace
10. #5 - Terry Labonte

Failed to qualify: #45 - Rich Bickle, #32 - Dick Trickle, #53 - Ritchie Petty, #02 - Derrike Cope, #31 - Ward Burton, #95 - Ben Hess, #47 - Billy Standridge, #80 - Joe Ruttman, #0 - Delma Cowart, #89 - Ronnie Sanders

- Astronaut Buzz Aldrin, one of the first humans to walk on the Moon, served as the grand marshal for this race; held four days after the 25th anniversary of the Apollo 11 mission. Instead of the traditional command to start engines, he said "Drivers, energize your groundcraft."
- This was Jimmy Spencer's second and final Cup Series victory.
- Spencer's victory would be the last for McDonald's as a primary sponsor until Talladega in 2021 with Bubba Wallace.

=== Brickyard 400 ===
The Inaugural Brickyard 400 was held August 6 at Indianapolis Motor Speedway. Rick Mast won the pole.

Top ten results

1. #24 - Jeff Gordon
2. #26 - Brett Bodine*
3. #11 - Bill Elliott
4. #2 - Rusty Wallace
5. #3 - Dale Earnhardt
6. #17 - Darrell Waltrip
7. #25 - Ken Schrader
8. #30 - Michael Waltrip
9. #75 - Todd Bodine
10. #21 - Morgan Shepherd

Failed to qualify (in order of speed): #39 - Joe Ruttman, #32 - Dick Trickle, #20 - Randy LaJoie, #59 - Jim Sauter, #29 - Steve Grissom, #88 - Davy Jones, #61w - Rick Carelli, #92w - John Krebs, #34 - Bob Brevak, #60 - Gary Bettenhausen, #52 - Brad Teague, #90 - Mike Wallace, #54 - Robert Pressley, #81w - Jeff Davis, #57 - Bob Schacht, #76w - Ron Hornaday Jr., #65 - Jerry O'Neil, #00w - Scott Gaylord, #67 - Ken Bouchard, #47 - Billy Standridge, #12 - Tim Steele, #36w - Rich Woodland Jr., #04w - Hershel McGriff, #56 - Jerry Hill, #59 - Andy Belmont, #36 - H. B. Bailey, #84 - Norm Benning, #58w - Wayne Jacks, #79 - Doug French, #41w - Steve Sellers, #48 - James Hylton, #91w - Robert Sprague (crash), #95w - Lance Wade (spin), #09 - Stan Fox (crash), #19 - Loy Allen Jr. (crash), #48w - Jack Sellers (no speed)

Did not attempt: #0 - Delma Cowart, #13 - Kerry Teague, #38 - P. J. Jones, #82 - Charlie Glotzbach, #86w - Butch Gilliland, #95 - Ben Hess, #90w - Joe Heath

- Ernie Irvan (who entered the race leading Dale Earnhardt in the championship race by 16 points) was holding off Jeff Gordon up until 5 to go when his right front tire cut down and Gordon took the lead; Irvan would finish 1 lap down in 17th as a result, which combined with Earnhardt's 5th place finish would result in Earnhardt taking the points lead which he would not relinquish for the remainder of the season.
- Brett Bodine caused controversy on lap 101 when he spun out his older brother Geoff, who seemingly made the winning pass on Brett. After being released from the infield hospital, Geoff responded to the accident by publicly announcing that he and Brett were feuding behind-the-scenes. This was a feud that lasted for several years, ending with both brothers reconciling in the late-1990's.
- Jimmy Spencer suffered bruising and a shattered scapula in a crash on lap 9, and would be forced to miss the next race.

=== The Bud at The Glen ===
The Bud at The Glen was held August 14 at Watkins Glen International. Mark Martin won the pole.

Top ten results

1. #6 - Mark Martin
2. #28 - Ernie Irvan
3. #3 - Dale Earnhardt
4. #25 - Ken Schrader
5. #10 - Ricky Rudd
6. #5 - Terry Labonte
7. #17 - Darrell Waltrip
8. #41 - Joe Nemechek
9. #24 - Jeff Gordon
10. #33 - Harry Gant

Failed to qualify: #00 - Scott Gaylord, #19 - Loy Allen Jr., #98 - Jeremy Mayfield, #90 - Mike Wallace, #50 - Brian Bonner

- Derrike Cope made his first start in the #12 Bobby Allison Motorsports Ford in this race.
- Unbeknownst to all, this would be Ernie Irvan's last race until late 1995.
- Tommy Kendall substituted for an injured Jimmy Spencer for this race. Kendall finished 2 laps down in 22nd.
- This was Wally Dallenbach Jr.'s final start with Petty Enterprises in a season marred by failing to qualify on 6 occasions. Dallenbach finished 14th.

=== GM Goodwrench Dealer 400 ===
The GM Goodwrench Dealer 400 was held August 21 at Michigan International Speedway. Geoff Bodine won the pole.

Top ten results

1. #7 - Geoff Bodine
2. #6 - Mark Martin
3. #1 - Rick Mast
4. #2 - Rusty Wallace
5. #22 - Bobby Labonte
6. #42 - Kyle Petty
7. #11 - Bill Elliott, -1 lap
8. #5 - Terry Labonte, -1 lap
9. #17 - Darrell Waltrip, -1 lap
10. #10 - Ricky Rudd, -1 lap

Failed to qualify: #40 - Bobby Hamilton, #23 - Hut Stricklin, #55 - Jimmy Hensley, 54 - Robert Pressley, #59 - Andy Belmont, #82 - Laura Lane, #52 - Brad Teague, #34 - Bob Brevak, #28 - Ernie Irvan* - Withdrew

- During practice for this race, Ernie Irvan blew a tire in Turn 2 and slammed the outside wall at high-speed, suffering near-fatal head, chest, and lung injuries. The team withdrew from the race, and Irvan would be out for the rest of 1994 and most of 1995.
- This was John Andretti's first start in the #43 Pontiac for Petty Enterprises, replacing Wally Dallenbach Jr.. Andretti started 2nd, the first front-row start for the team since July 1992, and finished 2 laps down in 17th.

=== Goody's 500 ===
The Goody's 500 was held August 27 at Bristol International Raceway. Harry Gant won the final pole of his career.

Top ten results

1. #2 - Rusty Wallace
2. #6 - Mark Martin
3. #3 - Dale Earnhardt
4. #17 - Darrell Waltrip
5. #11 - Bill Elliott
6. #4 - Sterling Marlin
7. #30 - Michael Waltrip
8. #75 - Todd Bodine
9. #33 - Harry Gant, -1 lap
10. #1 - Rick Mast, -1 lap

Failed to qualify: #95 - Jeff Green, #27 - Jimmy Spencer, #71 - Dave Marcis, #19 - Loy Allen Jr., #55 - Jimmy Hensley, #14 - Phil Parsons

- Starting with this race, Kenny Wallace would drive Ernie Irvan's #28 Ford for the rest of the season. Wallace finished a lap down in 13th.

=== Mountain Dew Southern 500 ===
The Mountain Dew Southern 500 was held on September 4 at Darlington Raceway. Geoff Bodine won the pole.

Top ten results

1. #11 - Bill Elliott*
2. #3 - Dale Earnhardt
3. #21 - Morgan Shepherd
4. #10 - Ricky Rudd
5. #4 - Sterling Marlin
6. #24 - Jeff Gordon, -1 lap
7. #2 - Rusty Wallace, -1 lap
8. #8 - Jeff Burton, -1 lap
9. #18 - Dale Jarrett, -2 laps
10. #5 - Terry Labonte, -2 laps

Failed to qualify: #61 - Rick Carelli, #57 - Bob Schacht

- This would be Bill Elliott's first victory since the 1992 season finale, breaking a 53-race winless streak. This would also be Elliott's last victory until November 2001, 226 races later.
- This would be Junior Johnson's final victory as a team owner.

=== Miller Genuine Draft 400 ===
The Miller Genuine Draft 400 was held September 10 at Richmond International Raceway. Ted Musgrave won the pole.

Top ten results

1. #5 - Terry Labonte
2. #24 - Jeff Gordon
3. #3 - Dale Earnhardt
4. #2 - Rusty Wallace
5. #10 - Ricky Rudd
6. #6 - Mark Martin
7. #29 - Steve Grissom
8. #26 - Brett Bodine, -1 lap
9. #25 - Ken Schrader, -1 lap
10. #17 - Darrell Waltrip, -1 lap

Failed to qualify: #47 - Billy Standridge, #51 - Dirk Stephens, #80 - Joe Ruttman, #9 - Phil Parsons, #52 - Brad Teague, #01 - Billy Ogle Jr., #8 - Jeff Burton*

- Jeff Burton's time was disallowed after his car failed post-qualifying inspection.

=== SplitFire Spark Plug 500 ===
The SplitFire Spark Plug 500 was held September 18 at Dover Downs International Speedway. Geoff Bodine won the pole.

Top ten results

1. #2 - Rusty Wallace*
2. #3 - Dale Earnhardt
3. #17 - Darrell Waltrip
4. #25 - Ken Schrader
5. #7 - Geoff Bodine
6. #42 - Kyle Petty
7. #5 - Terry Labonte
8. #29 - Steve Grissom, -1 lap
9. #15 - Lake Speed, -1 lap
10. #21 - Morgan Shepherd, -1 lap

Failed to qualify: #84 - Norm Benning, #79 - Doug French, #47 - Billy Standridge

- This was Rusty Wallace's third consecutive Dover victory, becoming the first driver to accomplish this feat.
- This would be the final Dover race on asphalt, as the surface would be replaced with concrete next season.
- Mark Martin was leading with 6 laps to go when he tangled with the lapped car of Ricky Rudd. Rusty Wallace assumed the lead and soon had a blown tire. The race finished under caution and Wallace kept the lead.

=== Goody's 500 ===
The Goody's 500 was held September 25 at Martinsville Speedway. Ted Musgrave won the pole.

Top ten results

1. #2 - Rusty Wallace*
2. #3 - Dale Earnhardt
3. #11 - Bill Elliott
4. #28 - Kenny Wallace
5. #18 - Dale Jarrett
6. #25 - Ken Schrader
7. #4 - Sterling Marlin, -1 lap
8. #33 - Harry Gant*, -1 lap
9. #16 - Ted Musgrave, -1 lap
10. #17 - Darrell Waltrip, -1 lap

Failed to qualify: #71 - Dave Marcis, #20 - Bobby Hillin Jr., #19 - Loy Allen Jr., #55 - Tim Fedewa, #98 - Jeremy Mayfield

- This was Rusty Wallace eighth (and final) victory of 1994, making this the second consecutive year Wallace won the most races in a season, winning 10 races in 1993.
- This would be 4th and final time that Rusty Wallace scored the most victories in a single season.
- Last career top-10 for Harry Gant.

=== Tyson Holly Farms 400 ===
The Tyson Holly Farms 400 was held October 2 at North Wilkesboro Speedway. Jimmy Spencer won the pole.

Top ten results

1. #7 - Geoff Bodine*
2. #5 - Terry Labonte, -1 lap
3. #1 - Rick Mast, -1 lap
4. #2 - Rusty Wallace, -1 lap
5. #6 - Mark Martin, -2 laps
6. #11 - Bill Elliott, -2 laps
7. #3 - Dale Earnhardt, -2 laps
8. #24 - Jeff Gordon, -2 laps
9. #16 - Ted Musgrave, -3 laps
10. #28 - Kenny Wallace, -3 laps

Failed to qualify: #90 - Mike Wallace, #19 - Loy Allen Jr., #55 - Tim Fedewa, #52 - Brad Teague, #18 - Dale Jarrett*, #75 - Todd Bodine

- As of 2026, this is the last time that a driver has won a Cup Series race by a lap or more.
- This was the first time in his hall of fame career that Dale Jarrett failed to qualify for a Cup Series race.
- This would be the final Cup series points race victory for Hoosier Tires, as they would withdraw from the Cup Series after the season ended.
- This was the penultimate Cup Series race victory for Geoff Bodine. He would win one more Cup race, in 1996 at Watkins Glen.

=== Mello Yello 500 ===
The Mello Yello 500 was held October 9 at Charlotte Motor Speedway. Ward Burton won the pole.

Top ten results

1. #18 - Dale Jarrett*
2. #21 - Morgan Shepherd
3. #3 - Dale Earnhardt
4. #25 - Ken Schrader
5. #15 - Lake Speed
6. #26 - Brett Bodine
7. #5 - Terry Labonte
8. #12 - Derrike Cope
9. #17 - Darrell Waltrip
10. #30 - Michael Waltrip, -1 lap*

Failed to qualify: #71 - Dave Marcis, #9 - Phil Parsons, #67 - Ken Bouchard, #55 - Butch Miller, #02 - Brad Noffsinger, #52 - Brad Teague, #78 - Pancho Carter, #53 - Kirk Shelmerdine, #84 - Norm Benning, #95 - Ben Hess, #45 - Rich Bickle, #0 - Delma Cowart

- Dale Jarrett's victory came after failing to qualify for the previous race at North Wilkesboro. This would be the first time that a driver failed to qualify for a race, and then win the next race.
- This would be Dale Jarrett's last victory for Joe Gibbs Racing. Jarrett would leave Gibbs and join Robert Yates Racing for 1995.
- Former NASCAR Winston Cup champion Cale Yarborough served as a commentator for TBS.
- On the final lap of the race, Michael Waltrip, Darrell Waltrip, and Bobby Hillin Jr. crashed, Darrell was the only driver of the 3 to finish the last lap. Hillin finished 15th, 3 laps down to the winner

=== AC Delco 500 ===
The AC Delco 500 was held October 23 at North Carolina Speedway. Ricky Rudd won the pole.

Top ten results

1. #3 - Dale Earnhardt*
2. #1 - Rick Mast
3. #21 - Morgan Shepherd
4. #10 - Ricky Rudd
5. #5 - Terry Labonte
6. #11 - Bill Elliott
7. #6 - Mark Martin
8. #32 - Dick Trickle
9. #31 - Ward Burton, -1 lap
10. #15 - Lake Speed, -1 lap

Failed to qualify: #02 - Brad Noffsinger, #52 - Brad Teague, #84 - Norm Benning

- By winning this race Dale Earnhardt clinched his 7th and final NASCAR Winston Cup Championship with 2 races to go, beating Rusty Wallace by 448 points. This would be the 4th and final time under the Latford points system that a driver would clinch the Cup Series championship with 2 or more races left in a season.
- With this 7th championship, Earnhardt ties Richard Petty for most Championships in NASCAR Cup Series history.
- As of 2024, Dale Earnhardt is the only driver in NASCAR history to win 7 championships under one points system, as Richard Petty won 7 titles under 5 points systems, and future 7-time champion Jimmie Johnson would win 7 titles under 4 points systems.
- The race itself came down to a photo finish with Earnhardt prevailing over Rick Mast.

=== Slick 50 500 ===
The Slick 50 500 was held October 30 at Phoenix International Raceway. Sterling Marlin won the pole.

Top ten results

1. #5 - Terry Labonte
2. #6 - Mark Martin
3. #4 - Sterling Marlin
4. #24 - Jeff Gordon, -1 lap
5. #16 - Ted Musgrave, -1 lap
6. #42 - Kyle Petty, -1 lap
7. #10 - Ricky Rudd, -1 lap
8. #7 - Geoff Bodine, -1 lap
9. #18 - Dale Jarrett, -2 laps
10. #17 - Darrell Waltrip, -2 laps

Failed to qualify: #51 - Jeff Purvis, #02 - Brad Noffsinger, #00 - Scott Gaylord, #07 - Doug George, #81 - Jeff Davis, #90 - Joe Heath, #86 - Rich Woodland Jr., #92 - John Krebs, #22 - St. James Davis, #95 - Lance Wade, #58 - Wayne Jacks

- The final 189 laps of the race were all under green flag conditions, leading to unusual gaps among the lead cars.
- Even though he clinched the championship the week before at Rockingham, Dale Earnhardt would blow an engine at lap 91 and finish 40th.

=== Hooters 500 ===
The Hooters 500 was held November 13 at Atlanta Motor Speedway. Greg Sacks won the pole.

Top ten results

1. #6 - Mark Martin*
2. #3 - Dale Earnhardt*
3. #75 - Todd Bodine
4. #15 - Lake Speed
5. #90 - Mike Wallace
6. #21 - Morgan Shepherd
7. #12 - Derrike Cope, -1 lap
8. #5 - Terry Labonte, -2 laps
9. #18 - Dale Jarrett, -2 laps
10. #30 - Michael Waltrip, -2 laps

Failed to qualify: #55 - Tim Fedewa, #98 - Jeremy Mayfield, #64 - Gary Wright, #47 - Billy Standridge, #32 - Dick Trickle, #45 - Rich Bickle, #71 - Dave Marcis, #80 - Joe Ruttman, #35 - Bill Venturini, #53 - Brad Teague, #61 - Rick Carelli, #34 - Bob Brevak, #50 - Brian Bonner

- Dale Earnhardt ended the season with a 444-point lead over Mark Martin, the 4th largest point margin under the Bob Latford Winston Cup points system.
- This was Jimmy Means' last start in the Cup Series as an owner, with Gary Bradberry driving. Bradberry would finish 52 laps down in 30th.
- This was Harry Gant's last points race in the Cup Series, finishing 33rd due to an oil pan failure on lap 257. Gant would return to the Cup Series in the 1996 Winston Select, serving as a substitute driver for Bill Elliott.
- Hoosier Tires made their last NASCAR Cup start in this race, with Goodyear returning to being the sole tire supplier for the series starting in 1995.
- Rusty Wallace finished this race in 32nd due to engine issues, allowing race winner Mark Martin to overtake Wallace for 2nd in the final points standings.

== Final points standings ==
(key) Bold - Pole position awarded by time. Italics - Pole position set by owner's points standings. *- Most laps led.

Pos	Driver	DAY	CAR	RCH	ATL	DAR	BRI	NWS	MAR	TAL	SON	CLT	DOV	POC	MCH	DAY	NHA	POC	TAL	IND	GLN	MCH	BRI	DAR	RCH	DOV	MAR	NWS	CLT	CAR	PHO	ATL	Points
1	Dale Earnhardt	7	7	4	12	1*	1*	5	11	1	3	9	28	2	2	**3**	2	7	**34**	5	3	37	3	2	3	2	2	7	3	1*	40	2	4694
2	Mark Martin	13	4	6	5	2	21	13	3	38	8	32	4	5	3	4	4	31	6	35	**1***	2	2	25	6	19	16	5	39	7	2	**1***	4250
3	Rusty Wallace	41	1*	2	24	33	7	2	**1***	33	5	2*	1	**1***	1*	26	3	9	42	4	17	4	1	7	4	1	1*	4	37	35	17	32	4207
4	Ken Schrader	10	9	11	16	7	2	9	31	5	9	24	3	3	6	5	24	39	4	7	4	11	19	32*	9	4	6	14	4	32	15	11	4060
5	Ricky Rudd	8	11	18	9	9	32	6	12	25	14	6	19	21	4	17	1	6	7	11	5	10	12	4	5	18	25	11	29	**4**	7	14	4050
6	Morgan Shepherd	5	16	15	2	32	18	22	5	9	7	28	25	4	5	9	6	5	15	10	16	26	18	3	14	10	15	30	2	3	12	6	4029
7	Terry Labonte	3	17	9	14	35	24	1	15	32	28	35	26	18	20	15	11	15	10	12	6	8	33	10	1*	7	14	2	7	5	1*	8	3876
8	Jeff Gordon	4	32	3	8	31	22	15	33	24	37	**1**	5	6	12	8	39	8	31	1*	9	15	32	6	2	11	11	8	28	29	4	15	3776
9	Darrell Waltrip	28	23	16	3	26	15	28	4	14	18	30	6	30	10	25	23	28	24	6	7	9	4	13	10	3	10	13	9	23	10	21	3688
10	Bill Elliott	9	39	12	32	**3**	30	18	9	19	30	22	31	10	11	19	16	17	2	3	12	7	5	1	15	28	3	6	33	6	35	38	3617
11	Lake Speed	14	21	14	6	5	3	12	30	7	32	14	12	23	40	10	15	20	14	15	13	13	25	40	21	9	34	25	5	10	14	4	3565
12	Michael Waltrip	31	10	31	23	15	5	11	17	3	16	10	7	11	8	13	37	14	11	8	20	14	7	31	26	33	19	21	10	26	36	10	3512
13	Ted Musgrave	38	13	**13**	11	10	19	21	10	11	6	16	35	15	9	14	7	32	41	13	19	24	11	39	**17**	14	**9**	9	18	13	5	28	3477
14	Sterling Marlin	1	2	19	25	34	8	17	27	8	29	15	8	38	34	28	10	12	5	14	26	34	6	5	13	30	7	31	36	14	**3**	40	3443
15	Kyle Petty	39	8	5	13	11	20	4	26	13	11	26	11	12	17	34	8	27	19	25	37	6	15	12	38	6	24	26	30	36	6	22	3339
16	Dale Jarrett	35	18	10	35	4	36	25	21	21	12	4	29	20	14	11	14	10	39	40	11	30	26	9	16	34	5	DNQ	1	12	9	9	3298
17	Geoff Bodine	11	**15**	32	38	40	4	7	34	41	2	3	41	19	28	6	31	**1***	33	39	29	**1***	23*	**27**	18	**5***	18	1*	32*	40	8	34	3297
18	Rick Mast	27	3	7	26	37	29	10	8	20	34	31	30	9	13	29	9	40	20	**22**	38	3	10	20	33	15	29	3	12	2	42	27	3238
19	Brett Bodine	32	6	8	31	36	13	23	24	17	13	42	32	8	32	16	12	35	17	2	28	12	14	29	8	26	30	33	6	18	13	36	3159
20	Todd Bodine	36	34	25	33	22	26	19	6	28	38	8	16	14	31	7	5	11	16	9	15	38	8	26	20	16	33	DNQ	38	21	32	3	3048
21	Bobby Labonte	16	19	24	15	39	6	26	19	22	17	40	20	25	15	22	13	13	12	16	18	5	31	36	24	17	31	15	42	28	16	37	3038
22	Ernie Irvan	2*	5	1*	1*	6	33	**3***	2	**2***	**1***	5	**2***	7	18	2*	**30***	37	3*	17	2	Wth											3026
23	Bobby Hamilton	12	38	33	19	25	9	14	13	12	33	17	34	27	41	24	40	23	22	24	34	DNQ	28	22	34	31	13	12	19	33	11	24	2749
24	Jeff Burton **(R)**	26	20	20	4	20	31	33	36	39	15	29	33	22	21	18	38	4	26	19	25	33	20	8	DNQ	37	36	28	25	11	27	31	2726
25	Harry Gant	34	37	34	30	8	37	8	DNQ	23	10	7	42	16	35	31	17	38	21	37	10	25	**9**	41	22	13	8	32	22	31	23	33	2720
26	Hut Stricklin	33	26	DNQ	17	17	14	20	20	18	20	12	9	13	22	42	36	22	25	36	30	DNQ	35	14	30	32	23	22	21	27	24	16	2711
27	Joe Nemechek **(R)**	DNQ	36	21	18	19	16	DNQ	22	42	22	33	14	32	7	39	19	3	35	20	8	21	29	42	28	36	22	34	11	17	25	23	2673
28	Steve Grissom **(R)**	DNQ	30	23	20	14	12	DNQ	14	10	35	39	27	26	26	33	33	29	18	DNQ	23	19	34	23	7	8	12	20	26	30	22	26	2660
29	Jimmy Spencer	37	12	22	10	27	35	32	18	4	26	19	39	37	23	1	32	24	1	43		20	DNQ	37	35	39	20	**23**	16	38	38	20	2613
30	Derrike Cope	21	29	29	34	16	27	27	28	31	43	18	23	40	37	23	35	19	DNQ	27	40	18	16	35	19	12	17	19	8	37	30	7	2612
31	Greg Sacks	7	28	28	6	30	11	34	29	6	24	27	24	24	33	37	25	36	29	18	39	32	27	19	27	38	26	35	35	39	26	**39**	2593
32	John Andretti **(R)**	42	24	30	42	38	DNQ	31	35	29	19	36	22	35	36	35	27	25	40	28		17	30	16	11	25	21	17	24	25	43	13	2299
33	Mike Wallace **(R)**			DNQ	27	18	28	DNQ	DNQ	15	23	23	13	36	DNQ	12	28	30	13	DNQ	DNQ	16	24	17	23	29	28	DNQ	17	16	28	5	2191
34	Dick Trickle	20	14	37	28	29	34	24	32	36	DNQ	38	38	34	DNQ	21	34	DNQ	DNQ	DNQ	32	41	17	38	12	21	32	16	13	8	39	DNQ	2019
35	Ward Burton **(R)**	DNQ	DNQ	35	40	21	25	DNQ	16	DNQ	36	37	37	42	29	36	42	2	DNQ	31	24	29	36	34	25	27	35	18	**41**	9	21	41	1971
36	Dave Marcis	25	35	DNQ	36	28	10	29	DNQ	16	25	DNQ	18	33	DNQ	27	18	26	27	41	21	36	DNQ	28	29	35	DNQ	24	DNQ	34	19	DNQ	1910
37	Jeremy Mayfield **(R)**	30	DNQ	27	DNQ		DNQ	30		37		21			25	30	26	21	32	26	DNQ	23	21	33	37	24	DNQ	27	20	19	20	DNQ	1673
38	Wally Dallenbach Jr.	17	27	DNQ	DNQ	41	17	16	DNQ	34	4	25	10	17	DNQ	DNQ	DNQ	16	8	23	14												1493
39	Loy Allen Jr.	**22**	40	DNQ	**22**	DNQ	DNQ	DNQ	DNQ	40	DNQ	11	15	31	**24**	40	DNQ	18	37	DNQ	DNQ	22	DNQ	21	31	22	DNQ	DNQ	27	42	41	42	1468
40	Kenny Wallace														19				9				13	11	32	20	4	10	14	15	18	25	1413
41	Jimmy Hensley	15	22	36	29	13	DNQ	DNQ	23	30	DNQ	DNQ	17	29	42	32	29	DNQ	30	32	33	DNQ	DNQ						40			12	1394
42	Chuck Bown	23	25	17	41	12	**23**	35	7	27	21	13	21	39																			1211
43	Rich Bickle	DNQ	41	DNQ	37	23		DNQ		DNQ		34		28	30	20	21	34	DNQ	29		35							DNQ		37	DNQ	849
44	Bobby Hillin Jr.	24	33	26								DNQ			16	DNQ			23	21		40					DNQ		15			43	749
45	Brad Teague	DNQ				24	DNQ					41	40		DNQ	DNQ			28	DNQ		DNQ	22	30	DNQ	40	27	DNQ	DNQ	DNQ		DNQ	548
46	Jeff Purvis				21					35					27	38			36	34		28									DNQ		484
47	Billy Standridge **(R)**	DNQ	42	DNQ	DNQ	DNQ						43	36	DNQ	DNQ	DNQ		41	DNQ	DNQ		39		24	DNQ	DNQ			34	41		DNQ	404
48	Randy LaJoie											20					20			DNQ												19	312
49	Rick Carelli	DNQ	DNQ	DNQ	DNQ	DNQ					41				DNQ					DNQ		27		DNQ						22	33	DNQ	283
50	Phil Parsons																	DNQ				31	DNQ	15	DNQ			36	DNQ				243
51	Jeff Green																						DNQ		36			29				18	240
52	Tim Steele														39	43	41	33	38	DNQ													233
53	Butch Miller																							18					DNQ	20			212
54	Joe Ruttman	18														DNQ			DNQ	DNQ					DNQ				23			DNQ	203
55	Mike McLaughlin																22				27												179
56	Mike Chase										31									42											31		177
57	Robert Pressley	40															DNQ			DNQ		DNQ							31			35	171
58	Jay Hedgecock							36	25																								143
59	P. J. Jones																			DNQ	35										29		134
60	Ron Hornaday Jr.										39									DNQ											34		112
61	Pancho Carter																												DNQ			17	112
62	Jimmy Horton	19			DNQ					DNQ					DNQ																		106
63	Tommy Kendall																				22												97
64	Tim Fedewa																									23	DNQ	DNQ				DNQ	94
65	Randy MacDonald																													24			91
66	Kirk Shelmerdine									26																			DNQ				85
67	Butch Gilliland										27									DNQ													82
68	Chad Little	29																															81
69	Ken Bouchard																			DNQ									DNQ			29	76
70	Gary Bradberry																															30	73
71	A. J. Foyt																			30													73
72	Butch Leitzinger																				31												70
73	Mike Skinner		31					DNQ	DNQ																								70
74	Danny Sullivan	Wth	DNQ		DNQ															33													64
75	Scott Lagasse																				36												55
76	Geoff Brabham																			38													49
77	Robby Gordon														38																		49
78	Curtis Markham				39	DNQ		DNQ	DNQ																								46
79	Gary Collins										40																						43
80	John Krebs										42									DNQ											DNQ		42
81	Bob Keselowski													41																			40
82	Ritchie Petty	DNQ								DNQ						41			DNQ														40
83	Bob Schacht					DNQ												42		DNQ				DNQ									37
84	Phil Barkdoll	DNQ																															
85	Trevor Boys	DNQ																															
86	T. W. Taylor **(R)**	DNQ	DNQ	DNQ																													
87	Jerry Hill	DNQ	DNQ																	DNQ													
88	Buddy Baker	DNQ			DNQ																												
89	Jim Sauter	DNQ			DNQ					DNQ		DNQ								DNQ													
90	Delma Cowart	DNQ								DNQ						DNQ			DNQ	DNQ									DNQ				
91	Bob Brevak	DNQ													DNQ					DNQ		DNQ										DNQ	
92	Kerry Teague	DNQ																		DNQ													
93	James Hylton		DNQ																	DNQ													
94	Norm Benning	Wth				DNQ							DNQ							DNQ						DNQ			DNQ	DNQ			
95	Andy Belmont					DNQ							DNQ	DNQ						DNQ		DNQ											
96	H. B. Bailey					DNQ									DNQ					DNQ													
97	Freddie Query							DNQ																									
98	Jim Bown								DNQ																								
99	Ronnie Sanders	Wth								DNQ									DNQ														
100	Tobey Butler										DNQ																						
101	Charlie O'Brien										DNQ																						
102	Jack Sellers									DNQ										DNQ													
103	Jeff Davis										DNQ									DNQ											DNQ		
104	Joe Heath										DNQ									DNQ											DNQ		
105	Rich Woodland Jr.										DNQ									DNQ											DNQ		
106	Wayne Jacks										DNQ									DNQ											DNQ		
107	Scott Gaylord										DNQ									DNQ	DNQ										DNQ		
108	Doug George										DNQ																				DNQ		
109	Jamie Aube																DNQ																
110	Joe Bessey																DNQ																
111	Jerry O'Neil																	DNQ		DNQ													
112	Ben Hess																		DNQ	DNQ									DNQ				
113	Davy Jones																			DNQ													
114	Gary Bettenhausen																			DNQ													
115	Hershel McGriff																			DNQ													
116	Steve Sellers																			DNQ													
117	Stan Fox																			DNQ													
118	Robert Sprague																			DNQ													
119	Charlie Glotzbach																			DNQ													
120	Doug French																			DNQ						DNQ							
121	Lance Wade																			DNQ											DNQ		
122	Brian Bonner																				DNQ											DNQ	
123	Laura Lane																					DNQ											
124	Dirk Stephens																								DNQ								
125	Billy Ogle Jr.																								DNQ								
126	Brad Noffsinger																												DNQ				
127	St. James Davis																														DNQ		
128	Gary Wright																															DNQ	
129	Bill Venturini																															DNQ	
130	Neil Bonnett	Wth																															
131	Rodney Orr	Wth																															
132	Mark Thompson	Wth																															
133	Rick Crawford	Wth																															
134	Scott Brayton	Wth																															
135	Tommy Houston																								QL								
Pos	Driver	DAY	CAR	RCH	ATL	DAR	BRI	NWS	MAR	TAL	SON	CLT	DOV	POC	MCH	DAY	NHA	POC	TAL	IND	GLN	MCH	BRI	DAR	RCH	DOV	MAR	NWS	CLT	CAR	PHO	ATL	Points

== Rookie of the Year ==
A record eight drivers declared intentions to run for Maxx Racing Card Rookie of the Year before the 1994 season: brothers, Ward and Jeff Burton, John Andretti, T. W. Taylor, Joe Nemechek, Steve Grissom, Rick Carelli, and Loy Allen Jr. Taylor and Carelli dropped out early after a series of DNQs, while Billy Standridge joined the rookie of the year race with Johnson-Standridge Racing in March. Mike Wallace and Jeremy Mayfield took part once they secured full-time rides in March as well.

Jeff Burton, driving the No. 8 Ford for Stavola Brothers Racing, was named Rookie of the Year for 1994, posting two top-five finishes. He was followed by fellow Busch Series graduates Grissom and Nemechek, each of whom had three top-ten finishes. Allen, despite three poles, struggled to find consistency and finished far back in the standings, while Mayfield and Andretti showed promise with different rides throughout the season. Mike Wallace (who started the year at Atlanta in March) and Ward Burton were plagued by qualifying troubles all season long. Standridge ran a partial schedule and was not a factor. Rich Bickle declared to run for the award in 1993, but failed to make enough races so he was technically still eligible for the award in 1994. Although, he did not officially declare to run as a rookie for the 1994 season and was deemed ineligible for the award despite making the required number of races.

== See also ==
- 1994 NASCAR Busch Series
- 1994–95 NASCAR SuperTruck Series exhibition races
- 1994 NASCAR Winston Transcontinental Series
