= Loy Allen Jr. =

American racing driver (born 1966)

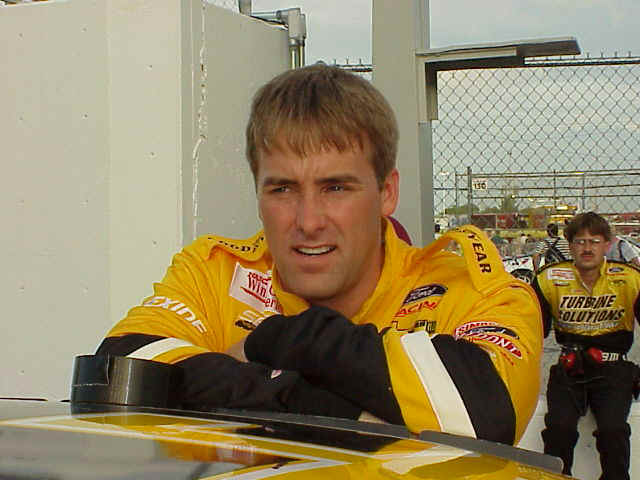
- Allen at Daytona International Speedway in 1999
- Born: April 7, 1966 (age 60); Raleigh, North Carolina, U.S.
- Achievements: 1994 Daytona 500 Pole Sitter

NASCAR Cup Series career
- 48 races run over 6 years
- Best finish: 39th (1994)
- First race: 1993 Pepsi 400 (Daytona)
- Last race: 1999 Pepsi 400 (Daytona)
Wins	Top tens	Poles
0	1	3

NASCAR O'Reilly Auto Parts Series career
- 4 races run over 3 years
- Best finish: 80th (1998)
- First race: 1995 All Pro Bumper To Bumper 300 (Charlotte)
- Last race: 1998 MBNA Platinum 200 (Dover)
Wins	Top tens	Poles
0	1	0
- Statistics up to date as of November 27, 2012.

Loy Allen Jr. (born April 7, 1966) is an American former professional NASCAR Winston Cup, Busch, and ARCA series race car driver, turned real estate developer and Embry-Riddle-trained commercial pilot. On February 12, 1994, he became the youngest and first rookie in NASCAR Winston Cup history to win the Daytona 500 pole.

== Racing career ==
=== Early racing days ===
1971–1993: Allen began racing go karts at the age of five in Raleigh, North Carolina. He continued to progress his way up through each racing circuit level. By the age of sixteen, he had won several World Karting Association Championships and had already graduated to racing dirt late model cars. He also earned his Commercial Pilot’s license from Embry-Riddle Aeronautical University, as his passion for aviation paralleled his passion for racing.

=== Winston Cup career ===
1993: Allen made his Winston Cup debut at Daytona International Speedway on July 3. He drove the No. 37 Naturally Fresh Ford, a former Robert Yates Race Car, starting in fortieth position, finishing in 29th. He went on to compete at Talladega Superspeedway on July 25, where he placed 26th in the No. 37 Naturally Fresh Ford. Following that race, he joined the TriStar Motorsports Team in October at Phoenix Raceway Slick 50 500. He drove the No. 68 Country Time Ford, finishing 26th.

1994: After winning eight poles in fifteen starts and a race at Atlanta Motor Speedway in the ARCA Series, Allen continued on driving for TriStar Motorsports Team in the No. 19 Hooters Ford. It was at the season-opening Daytona 500 that he became the second-youngest and first Rookie in Winston Cup history to win the Daytona 500 pole at the age of 27, behind a 26 year old Ricky Rudd in 1983. He would go on to finish 22nd in the race. In May, he finished seventh at the Coca-Cola 600 in Charlotte. He went on to finish fifteenth in the Budweiser 500 at Dover International Speedway in June and finished seventeenth in the Miller 500 at Pocono Raceway. In July, at Daytona, he missed the pole by hundredths of a second, as the late Winston Cup race car driver, Dale Earnhardt claimed the top spot. Allen had no wins and no top-tens, had an average finish of 28.8 and finished 39th in the standings while having seven DNFs. However, he had three poles on the season at Daytona, Atlanta, and Michigan despite not qualifying for twelve races.

1995: Allen signed with Junior Johnson Motorsports Team in the Hooters No. 27 Ford. He finished 17th at Daytona and 18th at Darlington, but failed to qualify at Atlanta (where he was on pole the year before), and sat 34th in the Winston Cup points. He was replaced by Hut Stricklin at Bristol. He returned to TriStar Motorsports, attempting nine races and qualifying for seven. In their first race at Talladega, he qualified second, and finished in tenth, his career-high Winston Cup finish. That summer, he also attempted Indianapolis and Michigan for Sadler Brothers Racing, but missed both races.

1996: In the second race of the season at Rockingham Speedway, Allen suffered a neck injury that put him out of commission for several races. He recovered and returned to Pocono International Raceway in June finishing 23rd, followed by 21st at Talladega Superspeedway.

1997: Allen continued racing with the TriStar Motorsports Team. He finished 26th at Daytona International Speedway, and 43rd at Rockingham Speedway.

1999: After a two-year hiatus, Allen qualified for races at Michigan and Daytona.

=== Busch Series career ===
Allen made four appearances in the NASCAR Busch Series during his career, with one top-ten finish at Charlotte.

1995: At Charlotte Motor Speedway in May, Allen qualified 21st in the No. 19 Chevrolet. A multi-car crash on lap 27 led to time spent in the garage, resulting in a 43rd place finish.

1997: Allen started the inaugural race at California in the No. 48 UniFirst Ford Thunderbird, replacing Randy Porter. He started 42nd and finished 35th.

1998: Allen finished seventh place at Talladega Superspeedway in the No. 78 Church's Chicken Chevy—his career-high Busch Series finish.

== Motorsports career results ==
=== NASCAR ===
(key) (Bold – Pole position awarded by qualifying time. Italics – Pole position earned by points standings. * – Most laps led.)

==== Winston Cup Series ====
NASCAR Winston Cup Series results
Year	Team	No.	Make	1	2	3	4	5	6	7	8	9	10	11	12	13	14	15	16	17	18	19	20	21	22	23	24	25	26	27	28	29	30	31	32	33	34	NWCC	Pts	Ref
1993	Loy Allen Sr.	37	Ford	DAY	CAR	RCH	ATL	DAR	BRI	NWS	MAR	TAL	SON	CLT	DOV	POC	MCH	DAY; 29	NHA	POC	TAL; 26	GLN	MCH; DNQ	BRI	DAR	RCH	DOV	MAR	NWS; DNQ	CLT; DNQ	CAR; 41		ATL; 29					45th	362	
1993	Tri-Star Motorsports	68	Ford																													PHO; 26						45th	362	
1994	Tri-Star Motorsports	19	Ford	**DAY**; 22	CAR; 40	RCH; DNQ	**ATL**; 22	DAR; DNQ	BRI; DNQ	NWS; DNQ	MAR; DNQ	TAL; 40	SON; DNQ	CLT; 11	DOV; 15	POC; 31	**MCH**; 24	DAY; 40	NHA; DNQ	POC; 18	TAL; 37	IND; DNQ	GLN; DNQ	MCH; 22	BRI; DNQ	DAR; 21	RCH; 31	DOV; 22	MAR; DNQ	NWS; DNQ	CLT; 27	CAR; 42	PHO; 41	ATL; 42				39th	1468	
1995	Junior Johnson & Associates	27	Ford	DAY; 17	CAR; 28	RCH; 29	ATL; DNQ	DAR; 18	BRI; DNQ	NWS	MAR																											41st	890	
1995	Tri-Star Motorsports	19	Ford									TAL; 10	SON	CLT; 36	DOV; DNQ	POC	MCH	DAY; 31	NHA	POC	TAL; 39					DAR; 34	RCH	DOV	MAR	NWS	CLT; 27	CAR; DNQ	PHO	ATL; 24				41st	890	
1995	Sadler Brothers Racing	95	Ford																			IND; DNQ	GLN	MCH; DNQ	BRI													41st	890	
1996	Tri-Star Motorsports	19	Ford	DAY; 36	CAR; 36	RCH	ATL	DAR	BRI	NWS	MAR	TAL	SON	CLT	DOV	POC; 23	MCH; 28	DAY; 30	NHA; DNQ	POC	TAL; 28	IND	GLN	MCH	BRI	DAR; 41	RCH	DOV	MAR	NWS	CLT; 34	CAR	PHO	ATL; 39				45th	603	
1997	Tri-Star Motorsports	19	Ford	DAY; 26	CAR; 43	RCH	ATL	DAR	TEX	BRI	MAR	SON	TAL	CLT	DOV	POC	MCH	CAL																				58th	119	
1997	LJ Racing	91	Chevy																DAY; DNQ	NHA	POC	IND	GLN	MCH	BRI	DAR	RCH	NHA	DOV	MAR	CLT	TAL	CAR	PHO	ATL			58th	119	
1998	Precision Products Racing	14	Pontiac	DAY; DNQ	CAR	LVS	ATL	DAR	BRI	TEX	MAR	TAL	CAL	CLT	DOV	RCH	MCH	POC	SON	NHA	POC																	NA	-	
1998	Moore-Robinson Motorsports	15	Ford																			IND; DNQ	GLN	MCH	BRI	NHA	DAR	RCH	DOV	MAR	CLT	TAL	DAY	PHO	CAR	ATL		NA	-	
1999	Donlavey Racing	90	Ford	DAY	CAR	LVS	ATL	DAR	TEX	BRI	MAR	TAL; DNQ	CAL	RCH	CLT	DOV																						62nd	86	
1999	SBIII Motorsports	58	Ford														MCH; 40	POC; DNQ	SON	DAY; 40	NHA	POC	IND	GLN	MCH	BRI	DAR	RCH	NHA	DOV	MAR	CLT	TAL	CAR	PHO	HOM	ATL	62nd	86	

===== Daytona 500 =====
Year	Team	Manufacturer	Start	Finish
1994	Tri-Star Motorsports	Ford	**1**	22
1995	Junior Johnson & Associates	Ford	37	17
1996	Tri-Star Motorsports	Ford	24	36
1997	Tri-Star Motorsports	Ford	33	26
1998	Precision Products Racing	Pontiac	DNQ	

==== Busch Series ====
NASCAR Busch Series results
Year	Team	No.	Make	1	2	3	4	5	6	7	8	9	10	11	12	13	14	15	16	17	18	19	20	21	22	23	24	25	26	27	28	29	30	31	32	NBSC	Pts	Ref
1995	Phoenix Racing	19	Pontiac	DAY	CAR	RCH	ATL	NSV	DAR	BRI	HCY	NHA	NZH	CLT	DOV	MYB	GLN	MLW	TAL	SBO	IRP	MCH	BRI	DAR	RCH	DOV	CLT; 43	CAR	HOM							112th	34	
1997	Mills Racing	19	Ford	DAY	CAR	RCH	ATL; DNQ	LVS	DAR; DNQ	HCY	TEX	BRI	NSV	TAL	NHA	NZH	CLT	DOV	SBO	GLN	MLW	MYB	GTY	IRP	MCH	BRI	DAR	RCH	DOV	CLT						108th	58	
1997	Porter Racing	48	Ford																												CAL; 35	CAR	HOM			108th	58	
1998	Mark III Motorsports	78	Chevy	DAY	CAR	LVS	NSV	DAR	BRI	TEX	HCY	TAL; 7	NHA	NZH	CLT; DNQ	DOV; 43	RCH	PPR	GLN	MLW	MYB	CAL	SBO	IRP	MCH	BRI	DAR	RCH	DOV	CLT	GTY	CAR	ATL	HOM		80th	180	
1999	Mark III Motorsports	78	Chevy	DAY; DNQ	CAR	LVS	ATL	DAR	TEX	NSV	BRI	TAL; DNQ	CAL	NHA	RCH	NZH	CLT	DOV	SBO	GLN	MLW	MYB	PPR	GTY	IRP	MCH	BRI	DAR	RCH	DOV	CLT	CAR	MEM	PHO	HOM	N/A	-	

=== ARCA Bondo/Mar-Hyde Series ===
(key) (Bold – Pole position awarded by qualifying time. Italics – Pole position earned by points standings or practice time. * – Most laps led.)

ARCA Bondo/Mar-Hyde Series results
Year	Team	No.	Make	1	2	3	4	5	6	7	8	9	10	11	12	13	14	15	16	17	18	19	20	21	ABMHSC	Pts	Ref
1992	Loy Allen Sr.	2	Ford	**DAY**; 13	FIF	**TWS**; 33	TAL; 25	TOL	KIL	POC; 7	MCH; 3	FRS	KIL	NSH	DEL	POC; 33	HPT	FRS	ISF	TOL	DSF	TWS; 3	SLM	ATL; 1	16th	1925	
1993	Loy Allen Sr.	2	Ford	DAY; 2	FIF	TWS; 36	**TAL**; 2	KIL	CMS	FRS	TOL	POC; 4	MCH; 28	FRS	POC; 3	KIL	ISF	DSF	TOL	SLM	WIN				25th	1265	
1993	Loy Allen Sr.	2	Chevy																			ATL; 32			25th	1265	
1994	Loy Allen Sr.	2	Ford	DAY; 31	TAL; 9	FIF	LVL	KIL	TOL	FRS	MCH	DMS	POC	POC	KIL	FRS	INF	I70	ISF	DSF	TOL	SLM	WIN				
1994	Tri-Star Motorsports	19	Chevy																					ATL; 22			
1995	Phoenix Racing	1	Chevy	DAY	ATL	TAL	FIF	KIL	FRS	MCH	I80	MCS	FRS	POC	POC	KIL	FRS	SBS	LVL	ISF	DSF	SLM	WIN	ATL; 28			
1999	SBIII Motorsports	58	Ford	DAY	ATL	SLM	AND	CLT	MCH	POC; DNQ	TOL	SBS	BLN	POC	KIL	FRS	FLM	ISF	WIN	DSF	SLM	CLT	TAL	ATL	N/A	0	

== See also ==
- List of Daytona 500 pole position winners
- List of people from Raleigh, North Carolina
