= 1994 Budweiser 500 =

12th race of the 1994 NASCAR Winston Cup Series

Race details
- Race 12 of 31 in the 1994 NASCAR Winston Cup Series
- The 1994 Miller Genuine Draft 500 program cover, featuring Bill Elliott.
- Date: June 5, 1994
- Official name: 26th Annual Budweiser 500
- Location: Dover, Delaware, Dover International Speedway
- Course: Permanent racing facility
- Course length: 1 miles (1.6 km)
- Distance: 500 laps, 500 mi (804.672 km)
- Scheduled distance: 500 laps, 500 mi (804.672 km)
- Average speed: 102.529 miles per hour (165.004 km/h)
- Attendance: 94,000

Pole position
| Driver | Ernie Irvan | Robert Yates Racing |
- Time: 23.691

Most laps led
| Driver | Ernie Irvan | Robert Yates Racing |
- Laps: 313

Winner
| No. 2 | Rusty Wallace | Penske Racing South |

Television in the United States
- Network: TNN
- Announcers: Mike Joy, Dick Berggren, Kenny Wallace

Radio in the United States
- Radio: Motor Racing Network

The 1994 Budweiser 500 was the 12th stock car race of the 1994 NASCAR Winston Cup Series season and the 45th iteration of the event. The race was held on Sunday, June 5, 1994, in Dover, Delaware at Dover International Speedway, a 1-mile (1.6 km) permanent oval-shaped racetrack. The race took the scheduled 500 laps to complete. At race's end, Penske Racing South driver Rusty Wallace was able to defend against a late race charge against Robert Yates Racing driver Ernie Irvan to take his 34th career NASCAR Winston Cup Series and his third victory of the season. To fill out the top three, the aforementioned Ernie Irvan and Hendrick Motorsports driver Ken Schrader would finish second and third, respectively.

== Background ==
The layout of Dover International Speedway, the venue where the race was held.

Dover International Speedway is an oval race track in Dover, Delaware, United States that has held at least two NASCAR races since it opened in 1969. In addition to NASCAR, the track also hosted USAC and the NTT IndyCar Series. The track features one layout, a 1-mile (1.6 km) concrete oval, with 24° banking in the turns and 9° banking on the straights. The speedway is owned and operated by Dover Motorsports.

The track, nicknamed "The Monster Mile", was built in 1969 by Melvin Joseph of Melvin L. Joseph Construction Company, Inc., with an asphalt surface, but was replaced with concrete in 1995. Six years later in 2001, the track's capacity moved to 135,000 seats, making the track have the largest capacity of sports venue in the mid-Atlantic. In 2002, the name changed to Dover International Speedway from Dover Downs International Speedway after Dover Downs Gaming and Entertainment split, making Dover Motorsports. From 2007 to 2009, the speedway worked on an improvement project called "The Monster Makeover", which expanded facilities at the track and beautified the track. After the 2014 season, the track's capacity was reduced to 95,500 seats.

=== Entry list ===
- (R) denotes rookie driver.

| # | Driver | Team | Make |
|---|---|---|---|
| 1 | Rick Mast | Precision Products Racing | Ford |
| 2 | Rusty Wallace | Penske Racing South | Ford |
| 3 | Dale Earnhardt | Richard Childress Racing | Chevrolet |
| 4 | Sterling Marlin | Morgan–McClure Motorsports | Chevrolet |
| 5 | Terry Labonte | Hendrick Motorsports | Chevrolet |
| 6 | Mark Martin | Roush Racing | Ford |
| 7 | Geoff Bodine | Geoff Bodine Racing | Ford |
| 8 | Jeff Burton (R) | Stavola Brothers Racing | Ford |
| 10 | Ricky Rudd | Rudd Performance Motorsports | Ford |
| 11 | Bill Elliott | Junior Johnson & Associates | Ford |
| 12 | Chuck Bown | Bobby Allison Motorsports | Ford |
| 14 | John Andretti (R) | Hagan Racing | Chevrolet |
| 15 | Lake Speed | Bud Moore Engineering | Ford |
| 16 | Ted Musgrave | Roush Racing | Ford |
| 17 | Darrell Waltrip | Darrell Waltrip Motorsports | Chevrolet |
| 18 | Dale Jarrett | Joe Gibbs Racing | Chevrolet |
| 19 | Loy Allen Jr. (R) | TriStar Motorsports | Ford |
| 21 | Morgan Shepherd | Wood Brothers Racing | Ford |
| 22 | Bobby Labonte | Bill Davis Racing | Pontiac |
| 23 | Hut Stricklin | Travis Carter Enterprises | Ford |
| 24 | Jeff Gordon | Hendrick Motorsports | Chevrolet |
| 25 | Ken Schrader | Hendrick Motorsports | Chevrolet |
| 26 | Brett Bodine | King Racing | Ford |
| 27 | Jimmy Spencer | Junior Johnson & Associates | Ford |
| 28 | Ernie Irvan | Robert Yates Racing | Ford |
| 29 | Steve Grissom | Diamond Ridge Motorsports | Chevrolet |
| 30 | Michael Waltrip | Bahari Racing | Pontiac |
| 31 | Ward Burton | A.G. Dillard Motorsports | Chevrolet |
| 32 | Dick Trickle | Active Motorsports | Chevrolet |
| 33 | Harry Gant | Leo Jackson Motorsports | Chevrolet |
| 40 | Bobby Hamilton | SABCO Racing | Pontiac |
| 41 | Joe Nemechek (R) | Larry Hedrick Motorsports | Chevrolet |
| 42 | Kyle Petty | SABCO Racing | Pontiac |
| 43 | Wally Dallenbach Jr. | Petty Enterprises | Pontiac |
| 47 | Billy Standridge (R) | Johnson Standridge Racing | Ford |
| 52 | Brad Teague | Jimmy Means Racing | Ford |
| 55 | Jimmy Hensley | RaDiUs Motorsports | Ford |
| 59 | Andy Belmont | Andy Belmont Racing | Ford |
| 71 | Dave Marcis | Marcis Auto Racing | Chevrolet |
| 75 | Todd Bodine | Butch Mock Motorsports | Ford |
| 77 | Greg Sacks | U.S. Motorsports Inc. | Ford |
| 84 | Norm Benning | Norm Benning Racing | Oldsmobile |
| 90 | Mike Wallace (R) | Donlavey Racing | Ford |
| 98 | Derrike Cope | Cale Yarborough Motorsports | Ford |

== Qualifying ==
Qualifying was split into two rounds. The first round was held on Friday, June 3, at 3:00 PM EST. Each driver would have one lap to set a time. During the first round, the top 20 drivers in the round would be guaranteed a starting spot in the race. If a driver was not able to guarantee a spot in the first round, they had the option to scrub their time from the first round and try and run a faster lap time in a second round qualifying run, held on Saturday, June 4, at 11:30 AM EST. As with the first round, each driver would have one lap to set a time. For this specific race, positions 21-34 would be decided on time, and depending on who needed it, a select amount of positions were given to cars who had not otherwise qualified but were high enough in owner's points; which was usually two. If needed, a past champion who did not qualify on either time or provisionals could use a champion's provisional, adding one more spot to the field.

Ernie Irvan, driving for Robert Yates Racing, won the pole, setting a time of 23.691 and an average speed of 151.956 mph (244.549 km/h) in the first round.

Two drivers would fail to qualify.

=== Full qualifying results ===
| Pos. | # | Driver | Team | Make | Time | Speed |
|---|---|---|---|---|---|---|
| 1 | 28 | Ernie Irvan | Robert Yates Racing | Ford | 23.691 | 151.956 |
| 2 | 7 | Geoff Bodine | Geoff Bodine Racing | Ford | 23.724 | 151.745 |
| 3 | 41 | Joe Nemechek (R) | Larry Hedrick Motorsports | Chevrolet | 23.774 | 151.426 |
| 4 | 22 | Bobby Labonte | Bill Davis Racing | Pontiac | 23.956 | 150.276 |
| 5 | 11 | Bill Elliott | Junior Johnson & Associates | Ford | 24.019 | 149.881 |
| 6 | 2 | Rusty Wallace | Penske Racing South | Ford | 24.049 | 149.694 |
| 7 | 16 | Ted Musgrave | Roush Racing | Ford | 24.099 | 149.384 |
| 8 | 40 | Bobby Hamilton | SABCO Racing | Pontiac | 24.109 | 149.322 |
| 9 | 21 | Morgan Shepherd | Wood Brothers Racing | Ford | 24.113 | 149.297 |
| 10 | 55 | Jimmy Hensley | RaDiUs Motorsports | Ford | 24.124 | 149.229 |
| 11 | 31 | Ward Burton (R) | A.G. Dillard Motorsports | Chevrolet | 24.135 | 149.161 |
| 12 | 75 | Todd Bodine | Butch Mock Motorsports | Ford | 24.181 | 148.877 |
| 13 | 18 | Dale Jarrett | Joe Gibbs Racing | Chevrolet | 24.184 | 148.859 |
| 14 | 3 | Dale Earnhardt | Richard Childress Racing | Chevrolet | 24.236 | 148.539 |
| 15 | 29 | Steve Grissom (R) | Diamond Ridge Motorsports | Chevrolet | 24.237 | 148.533 |
| 16 | 17 | Darrell Waltrip | Darrell Waltrip Motorsports | Chevrolet | 24.244 | 148.490 |
| 17 | 1 | Rick Mast | Precision Products Racing | Ford | 24.245 | 148.484 |
| 18 | 10 | Ricky Rudd | Rudd Performance Motorsports | Ford | 24.249 | 148.460 |
| 19 | 32 | Dick Trickle | Active Motorsports | Chevrolet | 24.251 | 148.447 |
| 20 | 25 | Ken Schrader | Hendrick Motorsports | Chevrolet | 24.258 | 148.404 |
Failed to lock in Round 1
| 21 | 26 | Brett Bodine | King Racing | Ford | 24.009 | 149.944 |
| 22 | 5 | Terry Labonte | Hendrick Motorsports | Chevrolet | 24.043 | 149.732 |
| 23 | 24 | Jeff Gordon | Hendrick Motorsports | Chevrolet | 24.160 | 149.007 |
| 24 | 98 | Derrike Cope | Cale Yarborough Motorsports | Ford | 24.212 | 148.687 |
| 25 | 47 | Billy Standridge | Johnson Standridge Racing | Ford | 24.213 | 148.680 |
| 26 | 8 | Jeff Burton (R) | Stavola Brothers Racing | Ford | 24.258 | 148.405 |
| 27 | 43 | Wally Dallenbach Jr. | Petty Enterprises | Pontiac | 24.273 | 148.313 |
| 28 | 27 | Jimmy Spencer | Junior Johnson & Associates | Ford | 24.278 | 148.282 |
| 29 | 71 | Dave Marcis | Marcis Auto Racing | Chevrolet | 24.292 | 148.197 |
| 30 | 4 | Sterling Marlin | Morgan–McClure Motorsports | Chevrolet | 24.293 | 148.191 |
| 31 | 42 | Kyle Petty | SABCO Racing | Pontiac | 24.306 | 148.112 |
| 32 | 6 | Mark Martin | Roush Racing | Ford | 24.315 | 148.057 |
| 33 | 14 | John Andretti (R) | Hagan Racing | Chevrolet | 24.361 | 147.777 |
| 34 | 30 | Michael Waltrip | Bahari Racing | Pontiac | 24.375 | 147.692 |
| 35 | 12 | Chuck Bown | Bobby Allison Motorsports | Ford | 24.439 | 147.306 |
| 36 | 77 | Greg Sacks | Jasper Motorsports | Ford | 24.485 | 147.029 |
| 37 | 33 | Harry Gant | Leo Jackson Motorsports | Chevrolet | 24.489 | 147.005 |
| 38 | 23 | Hut Stricklin | Travis Carter Enterprises | Ford | 24.510 | 146.879 |
| 39 | 19 | Loy Allen Jr. (R) | TriStar Motorsports | Ford | 24.520 | 146.819 |
| 40 | 15 | Lake Speed | Melling Racing | Ford | 24.562 | 146.568 |
Provisionals
| 41 | 90 | Mike Wallace (R) | Donlavey Racing | Ford | -* | -* |
| 42 | 52 | Brad Teague | Jimmy Means Racing | Ford | -* | -* |
Failed to qualify
| 43 | 84 | Norm Benning | Norm Benning Racing | Oldsmobile | -* | -* |
| 44 | 59 | Andy Belmont | Andy Belmont Racing | Ford | -* | -* |
Official first round qualifying results
Official starting lineup

== Race results ==
| Fin | St | # | Driver | Team | Make | Laps | Led | Status | Pts | Winnings |
|---|---|---|---|---|---|---|---|---|---|---|
| 1 | 6 | 2 | Rusty Wallace | Penske Racing South | Ford | 500 | 150 | running | 180 | $70,605 |
| 2 | 1 | 28 | Ernie Irvan | Robert Yates Racing | Ford | 500 | 313 | running | 180 | $54,830 |
| 3 | 20 | 25 | Ken Schrader | Hendrick Motorsports | Chevrolet | 500 | 0 | running | 165 | $35,605 |
| 4 | 32 | 6 | Mark Martin | Roush Racing | Ford | 500 | 1 | running | 165 | $29,765 |
| 5 | 23 | 24 | Jeff Gordon | Hendrick Motorsports | Chevrolet | 500 | 0 | running | 155 | $33,570 |
| 6 | 16 | 17 | Darrell Waltrip | Darrell Waltrip Motorsports | Chevrolet | 499 | 0 | running | 150 | $22,365 |
| 7 | 34 | 30 | Michael Waltrip | Bahari Racing | Pontiac | 499 | 2 | running | 151 | $20,515 |
| 8 | 30 | 4 | Sterling Marlin | Morgan–McClure Motorsports | Chevrolet | 498 | 0 | running | 142 | $22,415 |
| 9 | 38 | 23 | Hut Stricklin | Travis Carter Enterprises | Ford | 498 | 0 | running | 138 | $17,165 |
| 10 | 27 | 43 | Wally Dallenbach Jr. | Petty Enterprises | Pontiac | 497 | 0 | running | 134 | $16,865 |
| 11 | 31 | 42 | Kyle Petty | SABCO Racing | Pontiac | 497 | 0 | running | 130 | $21,615 |
| 12 | 40 | 15 | Lake Speed | Melling Racing | Ford | 497 | 0 | running | 127 | $20,115 |
| 13 | 41 | 90 | Mike Wallace (R) | Donlavey Racing | Ford | 496 | 0 | running | 124 | $14,015 |
| 14 | 3 | 41 | Joe Nemechek (R) | Larry Hedrick Motorsports | Chevrolet | 496 | 0 | running | 121 | $13,115 |
| 15 | 39 | 19 | Loy Allen Jr. (R) | TriStar Motorsports | Ford | 495 | 0 | running | 118 | $9,665 |
| 16 | 12 | 75 | Todd Bodine | Butch Mock Motorsports | Ford | 494 | 0 | running | 115 | $12,065 |
| 17 | 10 | 55 | Jimmy Hensley | RaDiUs Motorsports | Ford | 493 | 1 | running | 117 | $8,965 |
| 18 | 29 | 71 | Dave Marcis | Marcis Auto Racing | Chevrolet | 490 | 5 | running | 114 | $11,650 |
| 19 | 18 | 10 | Ricky Rudd | Rudd Performance Motorsports | Ford | 489 | 0 | running | 106 | $11,465 |
| 20 | 4 | 22 | Bobby Labonte | Bill Davis Racing | Pontiac | 482 | 0 | crash | 103 | $15,965 |
| 21 | 35 | 12 | Chuck Bown | Bobby Allison Motorsports | Ford | 482 | 0 | running | 100 | $15,165 |
| 22 | 33 | 14 | John Andretti (R) | Hagan Racing | Chevrolet | 482 | 0 | running | 97 | $12,615 |
| 23 | 24 | 98 | Derrike Cope | Cale Yarborough Motorsports | Ford | 481 | 0 | running | 94 | $10,965 |
| 24 | 36 | 77 | Greg Sacks | Jasper Motorsports | Ford | 476 | 0 | running | 91 | $10,815 |
| 25 | 9 | 21 | Morgan Shepherd | Wood Brothers Racing | Ford | 444 | 0 | crash | 88 | $19,465 |
| 26 | 22 | 5 | Terry Labonte | Hendrick Motorsports | Chevrolet | 438 | 0 | running | 85 | $18,415 |
| 27 | 15 | 29 | Steve Grissom (R) | Diamond Ridge Motorsports | Chevrolet | 428 | 0 | running | 82 | $10,565 |
| 28 | 14 | 3 | Dale Earnhardt | Richard Childress Racing | Chevrolet | 425 | 0 | running | 79 | $22,065 |
| 29 | 13 | 18 | Dale Jarrett | Joe Gibbs Racing | Chevrolet | 424 | 0 | running | 76 | $19,665 |
| 30 | 17 | 1 | Rick Mast | Precision Products Racing | Ford | 402 | 0 | handling | 73 | $14,315 |
| 31 | 5 | 11 | Bill Elliott | Junior Johnson & Associates | Ford | 397 | 0 | engine | 70 | $14,165 |
| 32 | 21 | 26 | Brett Bodine | King Racing | Ford | 376 | 14 | running | 72 | $14,605 |
| 33 | 26 | 8 | Jeff Burton (R) | Stavola Brothers Racing | Ford | 365 | 0 | running | 64 | $13,555 |
| 34 | 8 | 40 | Bobby Hamilton | SABCO Racing | Pontiac | 359 | 0 | crash | 61 | $12,005 |
| 35 | 7 | 16 | Ted Musgrave | Roush Racing | Ford | 358 | 0 | crash | 58 | $11,805 |
| 36 | 25 | 47 | Billy Standridge | Johnson Standridge Racing | Ford | 339 | 0 | running | 55 | $7,780 |
| 37 | 11 | 31 | Ward Burton (R) | A.G. Dillard Motorsports | Chevrolet | 218 | 0 | crash | 52 | $7,780 |
| 38 | 19 | 32 | Dick Trickle | Active Motorsports | Chevrolet | 171 | 0 | crash | 49 | $7,780 |
| 39 | 28 | 27 | Jimmy Spencer | Junior Johnson & Associates | Ford | 95 | 0 | crash | 46 | $7,780 |
| 40 | 42 | 52 | Brad Teague | Jimmy Means Racing | Ford | 84 | 0 | axle | 43 | $7,780 |
| 41 | 2 | 7 | Geoff Bodine | Geoff Bodine Racing | Ford | 68 | 14 | crash | 45 | $12,180 |
| 42 | 37 | 33 | Harry Gant | Leo Jackson Motorsports | Chevrolet | 14 | 0 | crash | 37 | $12,180 |
Official race results

== Standings after the race ==
Drivers' Championship standings

| | Pos | Driver | Points |
|---|---|---|---|
| | 1 | Ernie Irvan | 1,979 |
| | 2 | Dale Earnhardt | 1,816 (-163) |
| | 3 | Rusty Wallace | 1,650 (-329) |
| | 4 | Ken Schrader | 1,605 (–374) |
| | 5 | Mark Martin | 1,601 (–378) |
| 1 | 6 | Ricky Rudd | 1,476 (–503) |
| 1 | 7 | Lake Speed | 1,473 (–506) |
| 2 | 8 | Morgan Shepherd | 1,462 (–517) |
| 1 | 9 | Michael Waltrip | 1,448 (–531) |
| 1 | 10 | Sterling Marlin | 1,434 (–545) |
Official driver's standings

- Note: Only the first 10 positions are included for the driver standings.

| Previous race: 1994 Coca-Cola 600 | NASCAR Winston Cup Series; 1994 season | Next race: 1994 UAW-GM Teamwork 500 |
