= 1994 Mountain Dew Southern 500 =

23rd race of the 1994 NASCAR Winston Cup Series

Race details
- Race 23 of 31 in the 1994 NASCAR Winston Cup Series
- The 1994 Mountain Dew Southern 500 program cover, featuring Dale Earnhardt.
- Date: September 4, 1994
- Official name: 45th Annual Mountain Dew Southern 500
- Location: Darlington Raceway, Darlington, South Carolina
- Course: Permanent racing facility
- Course length: 1.366 miles (2.198 km)
- Distance: 367 laps, 501.322 mi (806.799 km)
- Average speed: 127.952 miles per hour (205.919 km/h)
- Attendance: 50,000

Pole position
Driver	Geoff Bodine	Geoff Bodine Racing
- Time: 29.447

Most laps led
Driver	Ken Schrader	Hendrick Motorsports
- Laps: 127

Winner
No. 11	Bill Elliott	Junior Johnson & Associates

Television in the United States
- Network: ESPN
- Announcers: Jerry Punch, Ned Jarrett, Benny Parsons

Radio in the United States
- Radio: Motor Racing Network

The 1994 Mountain Dew Southern 500 was the 23rd stock car race of the 1994 NASCAR Winston Cup Series season and the 45th iteration of the event. The race was held on Sunday, September 4, 1994, before an audience of 50,000 in Darlington, South Carolina, at Darlington Raceway, a 1.366 miles (2.198 km) permanent egg-shaped oval racetrack. The race took the scheduled 367 laps to complete. In the final stages of the race, Junior Johnson & Associates driver Bill Elliott would make a late-race charge to the lead, passing with 13 to go to take his 40th career NASCAR Winston Cup Series victory and his only victory of the season. To fill out the top three, Richard Childress Racing driver Dale Earnhardt and Wood Brothers Racing driver Morgan Shepherd would finish second and third, respectively. The race would be Bill Elliott's last win in a Ford.

== Background ==
The layout of Darlington Raceway, the venue where the race was held.

Darlington Raceway is a race track built for NASCAR racing located near Darlington, South Carolina. It is nicknamed "The Lady in Black" and "The Track Too Tough to Tame" by many NASCAR fans and drivers and advertised as "A NASCAR Tradition." It is of a unique, somewhat egg-shaped design, an oval with the ends of very different configurations, a condition which supposedly arose from the proximity of one end of the track to a minnow pond the owner refused to relocate. This situation makes it very challenging for the crews to set up their cars' handling in a way that is effective at both ends.

=== Entry list ===
- (R) denotes rookie driver.

#	Driver	Team	Make
1	Rick Mast	Precision Products Racing	Ford
2	Rusty Wallace	Penske Racing South	Ford
3	Dale Earnhardt	Richard Childress Racing	Chevrolet
4	Sterling Marlin	Morgan–McClure Motorsports	Chevrolet
5	Terry Labonte	Hendrick Motorsports	Chevrolet
6	Mark Martin	Roush Racing	Ford
7	Geoff Bodine	Geoff Bodine Racing	Ford
8	Jeff Burton (R)	Stavola Brothers Racing	Ford
9	Phil Parsons	Melling Racing	Ford
10	Ricky Rudd	Rudd Performance Motorsports	Ford
11	Bill Elliott	Junior Johnson & Associates	Ford
12	Derrike Cope	Bobby Allison Motorsports	Ford
15	Lake Speed	Bud Moore Engineering	Ford
16	Ted Musgrave	Roush Racing	Ford
17	Darrell Waltrip	Darrell Waltrip Motorsports	Chevrolet
18	Dale Jarrett	Joe Gibbs Racing	Chevrolet
19	Loy Allen Jr. (R)	TriStar Motorsports	Ford
21	Morgan Shepherd	Wood Brothers Racing	Ford
22	Bobby Labonte	Bill Davis Racing	Pontiac
23	Hut Stricklin	Travis Carter Enterprises	Ford
24	Jeff Gordon	Hendrick Motorsports	Chevrolet
25	Ken Schrader	Hendrick Motorsports	Chevrolet
26	Brett Bodine	King Racing	Ford
27	Jimmy Spencer	Junior Johnson & Associates	Ford
28	Kenny Wallace	Robert Yates Racing	Ford
29	Steve Grissom	Diamond Ridge Motorsports	Chevrolet
30	Michael Waltrip	Bahari Racing	Pontiac
31	Ward Burton	A.G. Dillard Motorsports	Chevrolet
32	Dick Trickle	Active Motorsports	Chevrolet
33	Harry Gant	Leo Jackson Motorsports	Chevrolet
40	Bobby Hamilton	SABCO Racing	Pontiac
41	Joe Nemechek (R)	Larry Hedrick Motorsports	Chevrolet
42	Kyle Petty	SABCO Racing	Pontiac
43	John Andretti (R)	Petty Enterprises	Pontiac
47	Billy Standridge (R)	Johnson Standridge Racing	Ford
52	Brad Teague	Jimmy Means Racing	Ford
55	Butch Miller	RaDiUs Motorsports	Ford
57	Bob Schacht	Balough Racing	Ford
61	Rick Carelli	Chesrown Racing	Chevrolet
71	Dave Marcis	Marcis Auto Racing	Chevrolet
75	Todd Bodine	Butch Mock Motorsports	Ford
77	Greg Sacks	U.S. Motorsports Inc.	Ford
90	Mike Wallace (R)	Donlavey Racing	Ford
98	Jeremy Mayfield (R)	Cale Yarborough Motorsports	Ford

== Qualifying ==
Qualifying was split into two rounds. The first round was held on Friday, September 2, at 3:00 pm EST. Each driver would have one lap to set a time. During the first round, the top 20 drivers in the round would be guaranteed a starting spot in the race. If a driver was not able to guarantee a spot in the first round, they had the option to scrub their time from the first round and try and run a faster lap time in a second round qualifying run, held on Saturday, September 3, at 11:30 am EST. As with the first round, each driver would have one lap to set a time. For this specific race, positions 21-40 would be decided on time, and depending on who needed it, a select amount of positions were given to cars who had not otherwise qualified but were high enough in owner's points; up to two provisionals were given. If needed, a past champion who did not qualify on either time or provisionals could use a champion's provisional, adding one more spot to the field.

Geoff Bodine, driving for his own Geoff Bodine Racing team, would win the pole, setting a time of 29.447 and an average speed of 166.998 miles per hour (268.757 km/h) in the first round.

Two drivers would fail to qualify.

=== Full qualifying results ===
Pos.	#	Driver	Team	Make	Time	Speed
1	7	Geoff Bodine	Geoff Bodine Racing	Ford	29.447	166.998
2	25	Ken Schrader	Hendrick Motorsports	Chevrolet	29.477	166.828
3	31	Ward Burton (R)	A.G. Dillard Motorsports	Chevrolet	29.484	166.789
4	41	Joe Nemechek (R)	Larry Hedrick Motorsports	Chevrolet	29.528	166.540
5	26	Brett Bodine	King Racing	Ford	29.534	166.506
6	6	Mark Martin	Roush Racing	Ford	29.538	166.484
7	24	Jeff Gordon	Hendrick Motorsports	Chevrolet	29.547	166.433
8	22	Bobby Labonte	Bill Davis Racing	Pontiac	29.547	166.433
9	11	Bill Elliott	Junior Johnson & Associates	Ford	29.552	166.405
10	1	Rick Mast	Precision Products Racing	Ford	29.621	166.017
11	28	Kenny Wallace	Robert Yates Racing	Ford	29.627	165.984
12	77	Greg Sacks	U.S. Motorsports Inc.	Ford	29.660	165.799
13	21	Morgan Shepherd	Wood Brothers Racing	Ford	29.662	165.788
14	8	Jeff Burton (R)	Stavola Brothers Racing	Ford	29.668	165.754
15	33	Harry Gant	Leo Jackson Motorsports	Chevrolet	29.727	165.425
16	40	Bobby Hamilton	SABCO Racing	Pontiac	29.775	165.159
17	32	Dick Trickle	Active Motorsports	Chevrolet	29.803	165.004
18	10	Ricky Rudd	Rudd Performance Motorsports	Ford	29.865	164.662
19	2	Rusty Wallace	Penske Racing South	Ford	29.920	164.358
20	12	Derrike Cope	Bobby Allison Motorsports	Ford	29.936	164.270
Failed to lock in Round 1
21	17	Darrell Waltrip	Darrell Waltrip Motorsports	Chevrolet	29.941	164.243
22	5	Terry Labonte	Hendrick Motorsports	Chevrolet	29.961	164.133
23	75	Todd Bodine	Butch Mock Motorsports	Ford	29.967	164.101
24	4	Sterling Marlin	Morgan–McClure Motorsports	Chevrolet	29.977	164.046
25	98	Jeremy Mayfield (R)	Cale Yarborough Motorsports	Ford	30.009	163.871
26	30	Michael Waltrip	Bahari Racing	Pontiac	30.015	163.838
27	3	Dale Earnhardt	Richard Childress Racing	Chevrolet	30.036	163.724
28	52	Brad Teague	Jimmy Means Racing	Ford	30.059	163.598
29	43	John Andretti (R)	Petty Enterprises	Pontiac	30.072	163.528
30	27	Jimmy Spencer	Junior Johnson & Associates	Ford	30.076	163.506
31	16	Ted Musgrave	Roush Racing	Ford	30.134	163.191
32	29	Steve Grissom (R)	Diamond Ridge Motorsports	Chevrolet	30.139	163.164
33	47	Billy Standridge (R)	Johnson Standridge Racing	Ford	30.156	163.072
34	9	Phil Parsons	Melling Racing	Ford	30.216	162.748
35	18	Dale Jarrett	Joe Gibbs Racing	Chevrolet	30.235	162.646
36	23	Hut Stricklin	Travis Carter Enterprises	Ford	30.259	162.517
37	42	Kyle Petty	SABCO Racing	Pontiac	30.293	162.335
38	71	Dave Marcis	Marcis Auto Racing	Chevrolet	30.488	161.296
39	90	Mike Wallace (R)	Donlavey Racing	Ford	30.519	161.132
40	15	Lake Speed	Bud Moore Engineering	Ford	30.551	160.963
Provisionals
41	55	Butch Miller	RaDiUs Motorsports	Ford	-*	-*
42	19	Loy Allen Jr. (R)	TriStar Motorsports	Ford	-*	-*
Failed to qualify
43	61	Rick Carelli	Chesrown Racing	Chevrolet	-*	-*
44	57	Bob Schacht	Balough Racing	Ford	-*	-*
Official first round qualifying results
Official starting lineup

== Race results ==
Fin	St	#	Driver	Team	Make	Laps	Led	Status	Pts	Winnings
1	9	11	Bill Elliott	Junior Johnson & Associates	Ford	367	21	running	180	$68,330
2	27	3	Dale Earnhardt	Richard Childress Racing	Chevrolet	367	87	running	175	$45,030
3	13	21	Morgan Shepherd	Wood Brothers Racing	Ford	367	0	running	165	$32,730
4	18	10	Ricky Rudd	Rudd Performance Motorsports	Ford	367	3	running	165	$24,715
5	24	4	Sterling Marlin	Morgan–McClure Motorsports	Chevrolet	367	4	running	160	$26,870
6	7	24	Jeff Gordon	Hendrick Motorsports	Chevrolet	366	0	running	150	$22,765
7	19	2	Rusty Wallace	Penske Racing South	Ford	366	8	running	151	$23,620
8	14	8	Jeff Burton (R)	Stavola Brothers Racing	Ford	366	0	running	142	$19,500
9	35	18	Dale Jarrett	Joe Gibbs Racing	Chevrolet	365	0	running	138	$23,370
10	22	5	Terry Labonte	Hendrick Motorsports	Chevrolet	365	0	running	134	$21,930
11	11	28	Kenny Wallace	Robert Yates Racing	Ford	364	0	running	130	$20,765
12	37	42	Kyle Petty	SABCO Racing	Pontiac	362	0	running	127	$19,970
13	21	17	Darrell Waltrip	Darrell Waltrip Motorsports	Chevrolet	362	4	running	129	$16,180
14	36	23	Hut Stricklin	Travis Carter Enterprises	Ford	361	0	running	121	$11,890
15	34	9	Phil Parsons	Melling Racing	Ford	361	0	running	118	$8,750
16	29	43	John Andretti (R)	Petty Enterprises	Pontiac	360	0	running	115	$11,930
17	39	90	Mike Wallace (R)	Donlavey Racing	Ford	359	0	running	112	$11,160
18	41	55	Butch Miller	RaDiUs Motorsports	Ford	359	0	running	109	$7,885
19	12	77	Greg Sacks	U.S. Motorsports Inc.	Ford	358	0	running	106	$10,705
20	10	1	Rick Mast	Precision Products Racing	Ford	356	0	running	103	$14,335
21	42	19	Loy Allen Jr. (R)	TriStar Motorsports	Ford	354	0	running	100	$7,200
22	16	40	Bobby Hamilton	SABCO Racing	Pontiac	353	0	running	97	$13,780
23	32	29	Steve Grissom (R)	Diamond Ridge Motorsports	Chevrolet	350	0	running	94	$9,560
24	33	47	Billy Standridge (R)	Johnson Standridge Racing	Ford	347	0	running	91	$6,785
25	6	6	Mark Martin	Roush Racing	Ford	342	105	engine	93	$20,975
26	23	75	Todd Bodine	Butch Mock Motorsports	Ford	333	0	running	85	$9,015
27	1	7	Geoff Bodine	Geoff Bodine Racing	Ford	323	6	engine	87	$17,805
28	38	71	Dave Marcis	Marcis Auto Racing	Chevrolet	321	0	engine	79	$8,595
29	5	26	Brett Bodine	King Racing	Ford	290	0	running	76	$12,385
30	28	52	Brad Teague	Jimmy Means Racing	Ford	281	0	crash	73	$6,125
31	26	30	Michael Waltrip	Bahari Racing	Pontiac	278	2	engine	75	$12,040
32	2	25	Ken Schrader	Hendrick Motorsports	Chevrolet	272	127	oil	77	$13,350
33	25	98	Jeremy Mayfield (R)	Cale Yarborough Motorsports	Ford	265	0	engine	64	$7,785
34	3	31	Ward Burton (R)	A.G. Dillard Motorsports	Chevrolet	236	0	overheating	61	$5,750
35	20	12	Derrike Cope	Bobby Allison Motorsports	Ford	213	0	crash	58	$11,140
36	8	22	Bobby Labonte	Bill Davis Racing	Pontiac	185	0	overheating	55	$10,080
37	30	27	Jimmy Spencer	Junior Johnson & Associates	Ford	181	0	crash	52	$5,570
38	17	32	Dick Trickle	Active Motorsports	Chevrolet	143	0	engine	49	$5,476
39	31	16	Ted Musgrave	Roush Racing	Ford	128	0	overheating	46	$9,390
40	40	15	Lake Speed	Bud Moore Engineering	Ford	112	0	overheating	43	$15,330
41	15	33	Harry Gant	Leo Jackson Motorsports	Chevrolet	94	0	handling	40	$9,330
42	4	41	Joe Nemechek (R)	Larry Hedrick Motorsports	Chevrolet	66	0	oil pump	37	$5,330
Official race results

== Standings after the race ==
Drivers' Championship standings

	Pos	Driver	Points
	1	Dale Earnhardt	3,450
1	2	Rusty Wallace	3,223 (-227)
1	3	Mark Martin	3,167 (-283)
2	4	Ricky Rudd	3,055 (–395)
1	5	Ernie Irvan	3,026 (–424)
1	6	Ken Schrader	3,001 (–449)
	7	Morgan Shepherd	2,956 (–494)
2	8	Bill Elliott	2,769 (–681)
1	9	Jeff Gordon	2,746 (–704)
1	10	Michael Waltrip	2,744 (–706)
Official driver's standings

- Note: Only the first 10 positions are included for the driver standings.

Previous race: 1994 Goody's 500 (Bristol)	NASCAR Winston Cup Series; 1994 season	Next race: 1994 Miller Genuine Draft 400 (Richmond)
