= 1994 UAW-GM Teamwork 500 =

13th race of the 1994 NASCAR Winston Cup Series

Race details
- Race 13 of 31 in the 1994 NASCAR Winston Cup Series
- The 1994 UAW-GM Teamwork 500 program cover, featuring Dale Earnhardt.
- Date: June 12, 1994
- Official name: 13th Annual UAW-GM Teamwork 500
- Location: Long Pond, Pennsylvania, Pocono Raceway
- Course: Permanent racing facility
- Course length: 2.5 miles (4.0 km)
- Distance: 200 laps, 500 mi (804.672 km)
- Scheduled distance: 200 laps, 500 mi (804.672 km)
- Average speed: 128.801 miles per hour (207.285 km/h)

Pole position
Driver	Rusty Wallace	Penske Racing South
- Time: 54.692

Most laps led
Driver	Rusty Wallace	Penske Racing South
- Laps: 141

Winner
No. 2	Rusty Wallace	Penske Racing South

Television in the United States
- Network: TNN
- Announcers: Mike Joy, Buddy Baker, Kenny Wallace

Radio in the United States
- Radio: Motor Racing Network

The 1994 UAW-GM Teamwork 500 was the 13th stock car race of the 1994 NASCAR Winston Cup Series season and the 13th iteration of the event. The race was held on Sunday, June 12, 1994, in Long Pond, Pennsylvania, at Pocono Raceway, a 2.5 miles (4.0 km) triangular permanent course. The race took the scheduled 200 laps to complete. In a one-lap shootout to the finish, Penske Racing South driver Rusty Wallace would be able to fend off the rest of the field to complete a dominant race performance. The win was Wallace's 35th career NASCAR Winston Cup Series win, his fourth victory of the season, and his second consecutive victory. To fill out the top three, Richard Childress Racing driver Dale Earnhardt and Hendrick Motorsports driver Ken Schrader would finish second and third, respectively.

== Background ==
The layout of Pocono Raceway, the venue where the race was held.

The race was held at Pocono Raceway, which is a three-turn superspeedway located in Long Pond, Pennsylvania. The track hosts one annual NASCAR Cup Series race, as well as one O'Reilly Auto Parts Series race. The track also formerly hosted an IndyCar Series race and NASCAR Truck Series race.

Pocono Raceway is one of a very few NASCAR tracks not owned by either Speedway Motorsports or NASCAR. It is operated by the Igdalsky siblings Brandon, Nicholas, and sister Ashley, and cousins Joseph IV and Chase Mattioli, all of whom are third-generation members of the family-owned Mattco Inc, started by Joseph II and Rose Mattioli.

Outside of the NASCAR races, the track is used throughout the year by Sports Car Club of America (SCCA) and motorcycle clubs as well as racing schools and an IndyCar race. The triangular oval also has three separate infield sections of racetrack – North Course, East Course and South Course. Each of these infield sections use a separate portion of the tri-oval to complete the track. During regular non-race weekends, multiple clubs can use the track by running on different infield sections. Also some of the infield sections can be run in either direction, or multiple infield sections can be put together – such as running the North Course and the South Course and using the tri-oval to connect the two.

=== Entry list ===
- (R) denotes rookie driver.

#	Driver	Team	Make
1	Rick Mast	Precision Products Racing	Ford
2	Rusty Wallace	Penske Racing South	Ford
3	Dale Earnhardt	Richard Childress Racing	Chevrolet
4	Sterling Marlin	Morgan–McClure Motorsports	Chevrolet
5	Terry Labonte	Hendrick Motorsports	Chevrolet
6	Mark Martin	Roush Racing	Ford
7	Geoff Bodine	Geoff Bodine Racing	Ford
8	Jeff Burton (R)	Stavola Brothers Racing	Ford
9	Rich Bickle (R)	Melling Racing	Ford
10	Ricky Rudd	Rudd Performance Motorsports	Ford
11	Bill Elliott	Junior Johnson & Associates	Ford
12	Chuck Bown	Bobby Allison Motorsports	Ford
14	John Andretti (R)	Hagan Racing	Chevrolet
15	Lake Speed	Bud Moore Engineering	Ford
16	Ted Musgrave	Roush Racing	Ford
17	Darrell Waltrip	Darrell Waltrip Motorsports	Chevrolet
18	Dale Jarrett	Joe Gibbs Racing	Chevrolet
19	Loy Allen Jr. (R)	TriStar Motorsports	Ford
21	Morgan Shepherd	Wood Brothers Racing	Ford
22	Bobby Labonte	Bill Davis Racing	Pontiac
23	Hut Stricklin	Travis Carter Enterprises	Ford
24	Jeff Gordon	Hendrick Motorsports	Chevrolet
25	Ken Schrader	Hendrick Motorsports	Chevrolet
26	Brett Bodine	King Racing	Ford
27	Jimmy Spencer	Junior Johnson & Associates	Ford
28	Ernie Irvan	Robert Yates Racing	Ford
29	Steve Grissom	Diamond Ridge Motorsports	Chevrolet
30	Michael Waltrip	Bahari Racing	Pontiac
31	Ward Burton	A.G. Dillard Motorsports	Chevrolet
32	Dick Trickle	Active Motorsports	Chevrolet
33	Harry Gant	Leo Jackson Motorsports	Chevrolet
40	Bobby Hamilton	SABCO Racing	Pontiac
41	Joe Nemechek (R)	Larry Hedrick Motorsports	Chevrolet
42	Kyle Petty	SABCO Racing	Pontiac
43	Wally Dallenbach Jr.	Petty Enterprises	Pontiac
47	Billy Standridge	Johnson Standridge Racing	Ford
52	Bob Keselowski	Jimmy Means Racing	Ford
55	Jimmy Hensley	RaDiUs Motorsports	Ford
59	Andy Belmont	Andy Belmont Racing	Ford
71	Dave Marcis	Marcis Auto Racing	Chevrolet
75	Todd Bodine	Butch Mock Motorsports	Ford
77	Greg Sacks	U.S. Motorsports Inc.	Ford
90	Mike Wallace (R)	Donlavey Racing	Ford
98	Derrike Cope	Cale Yarborough Motorsports	Ford

== Qualifying ==
Qualifying was split into two rounds. The first round was held on Friday, June 10, at 3:00 PM EST. Each driver would have one lap to set a time. During the first round, the top 20 drivers in the round would be guaranteed a starting spot in the race. If a driver was not able to guarantee a spot in the first round, they had the option to scrub their time from the first round and try and run a faster lap time in a second round qualifying run, held on Saturday, June 11, at 10:30 AM EST. As with the first round, each driver would have one lap to set a time. For this specific race, positions 21-40 would be decided on time, and depending on who needed it, a select amount of positions were given to cars who had not otherwise qualified but were high enough in owner's points; up to two provisionals were given. If needed, a past champion who did not qualify on either time or provisionals could use a champion's provisional, adding one more spot to the field.

Rusty Wallace, driving for Penske Racing South, won the pole, setting a time of 54.692 and an average speed of 164.558 mph (264.830 km/h) in the first round.

=== Full qualifying results ===
Pos.	#	Driver	Team	Make	Time	Speed
1	2	Rusty Wallace	Penske Racing South	Ford	54.692	164.558
2	10	Ricky Rudd	Rudd Performance Motorsports	Ford	54.844	164.102
3	6	Mark Martin	Roush Racing	Ford	54.945	163.800
4	24	Jeff Gordon	Hendrick Motorsports	Chevrolet	55.036	163.529
5	25	Ken Schrader	Hendrick Motorsports	Chevrolet	55.103	163.330
6	26	Brett Bodine	King Racing	Ford	55.172	163.126
7	28	Ernie Irvan	Robert Yates Racing	Ford	55.221	162.981
8	32	Dick Trickle	Active Motorsports	Chevrolet	55.296	162.760
9	16	Ted Musgrave	Roush Racing	Ford	55.380	162.514
10	30	Michael Waltrip	Bahari Racing	Pontiac	55.383	162.505
11	41	Joe Nemechek (R)	Larry Hedrick Motorsports	Chevrolet	55.410	162.426
12	17	Darrell Waltrip	Darrell Waltrip Motorsports	Chevrolet	55.434	162.355
13	43	Wally Dallenbach Jr.	Petty Enterprises	Pontiac	55.496	162.174
14	42	Kyle Petty	SABCO Racing	Pontiac	55.529	162.077
15	5	Terry Labonte	Hendrick Motorsports	Chevrolet	55.538	162.051
16	11	Bill Elliott	Junior Johnson & Associates	Ford	55.538	162.051
17	55	Jimmy Hensley	RaDiUs Motorsports	Ford	55.542	162.040
18	4	Sterling Marlin	Morgan–McClure Motorsports	Chevrolet	55.594	161.888
19	3	Dale Earnhardt	Richard Childress Racing	Chevrolet	55.670	161.667
20	77	Greg Sacks	U.S. Motorsports Inc.	Ford	55.682	161.632
Failed to lock in Round 1
21	14	John Andretti (R)	Hagan Racing	Chevrolet	55.746	161.447
22	18	Dale Jarrett	Joe Gibbs Racing	Chevrolet	55.823	161.224
23	23	Hut Stricklin	Travis Carter Enterprises	Ford	55.830	161.204
24	33	Harry Gant	Leo Jackson Motorsports	Chevrolet	55.851	161.143
25	31	Ward Burton (R)	A.G. Dillard Motorsports	Chevrolet	55.858	161.123
26	21	Morgan Shepherd	Wood Brothers Racing	Ford	55.859	161.120
27	22	Bobby Labonte	Bill Davis Racing	Pontiac	55.896	161.013
28	75	Todd Bodine	Butch Mock Motorsports	Ford	56.058	160.548
29	27	Jimmy Spencer	Junior Johnson & Associates	Ford	56.083	160.476
30	7	Geoff Bodine	Geoff Bodine Racing	Ford	56.137	160.322
31	19	Loy Allen Jr. (R)	TriStar Motorsports	Ford	56.168	160.234
32	40	Bobby Hamilton	SABCO Racing	Pontiac	56.286	159.898
33	15	Lake Speed	Bud Moore Engineering	Ford	56.343	159.736
34	71	Dave Marcis	Marcis Auto Racing	Chevrolet	56.368	159.665
35	8	Jeff Burton (R)	Stavola Brothers Racing	Ford	56.378	159.637
36	98	Derrike Cope	Cale Yarborough Motorsports	Ford	56.378	159.637
37	29	Steve Grissom (R)	Diamond Ridge Motorsports	Chevrolet	56.422	159.512
38	90	Mike Wallace (R)	Donlavey Racing	Ford	56.567	159.103
39	1	Rick Mast	Precision Products Racing	Ford	56.678	158.792
40	9	Rich Bickle (R)	Melling Racing	Ford	56.963	157.997
Provisionals
41	12	Chuck Bown	Bobby Allison Motorsports	Ford	-*	-*
42	52	Bob Keselowski	Jimmy Means Racing	Ford	-*	-*
Failed to qualify
43	47	Billy Standridge (R)	Johnson Standridge Racing	Ford	-*	-*
44	59	Andy Belmont	Andy Belmont Racing	Ford	-*	-*
Official first round qualifying results
Official starting lineup

== Race results ==
Fin	St	#	Driver	Team	Make	Laps	Led	Status	Pts	Winnings
1	1	2	Rusty Wallace	Penske Racing South	Ford	200	141	running	185	$84,525
2	19	3	Dale Earnhardt	Richard Childress Racing	Chevrolet	200	6	running	175	$46,425
3	5	25	Ken Schrader	Hendrick Motorsports	Chevrolet	200	3	running	170	$33,400
4	26	21	Morgan Shepherd	Wood Brothers Racing	Ford	200	1	running	165	$24,900
5	3	6	Mark Martin	Roush Racing	Ford	200	1	running	160	$30,400
6	4	24	Jeff Gordon	Hendrick Motorsports	Chevrolet	200	2	running	155	$23,505
7	7	28	Ernie Irvan	Robert Yates Racing	Ford	200	26	running	151	$23,705
8	6	26	Brett Bodine	King Racing	Ford	200	0	running	142	$19,405
9	39	1	Rick Mast	Precision Products Racing	Ford	200	2	running	143	$18,405
10	16	11	Bill Elliott	Junior Johnson & Associates	Ford	200	0	running	134	$20,155
11	10	30	Michael Waltrip	Bahari Racing	Pontiac	200	0	running	130	$17,355
12	14	42	Kyle Petty	SABCO Racing	Pontiac	199	0	running	127	$20,805
13	23	23	Hut Stricklin	Travis Carter Enterprises	Ford	199	0	running	124	$12,805
14	28	75	Todd Bodine	Butch Mock Motorsports	Ford	199	0	running	121	$12,505
15	9	16	Ted Musgrave	Roush Racing	Ford	199	0	running	118	$16,555
16	24	33	Harry Gant	Leo Jackson Motorsports	Chevrolet	199	0	running	115	$15,905
17	13	43	Wally Dallenbach Jr.	Petty Enterprises	Pontiac	198	1	crash	117	$11,705
18	15	5	Terry Labonte	Hendrick Motorsports	Chevrolet	198	0	running	109	$18,905
19	30	7	Geoff Bodine	Geoff Bodine Racing	Ford	198	0	running	106	$15,355
20	22	18	Dale Jarrett	Joe Gibbs Racing	Chevrolet	198	5	running	108	$20,680
21	2	10	Ricky Rudd	Rudd Performance Motorsports	Ford	198	11	running	105	$10,850
22	35	8	Jeff Burton (R)	Stavola Brothers Racing	Ford	197	0	running	97	$16,650
23	33	15	Lake Speed	Bud Moore Engineering	Ford	197	0	running	94	$18,150
24	20	77	Greg Sacks	U.S. Motorsports Inc.	Ford	197	0	running	91	$10,400
25	27	22	Bobby Labonte	Bill Davis Racing	Pontiac	197	0	running	88	$14,250
26	37	29	Steve Grissom (R)	Diamond Ridge Motorsports	Chevrolet	196	0	running	85	$10,600
27	32	40	Bobby Hamilton	SABCO Racing	Pontiac	195	0	running	82	$13,950
28	40	9	Rich Bickle (R)	Melling Racing	Ford	195	0	running	79	$7,900
29	17	55	Jimmy Hensley	RaDiUs Motorsports	Ford	195	1	running	81	$7,850
30	12	17	Darrell Waltrip	Darrell Waltrip Motorsports	Chevrolet	194	0	running	73	$13,800
31	31	19	Loy Allen Jr. (R)	TriStar Motorsports	Ford	193	0	running	70	$7,750
32	11	41	Joe Nemechek (R)	Larry Hedrick Motorsports	Chevrolet	180	0	running	67	$9,200
33	34	71	Dave Marcis	Marcis Auto Racing	Chevrolet	170	0	running	64	$7,600
34	8	32	Dick Trickle	Active Motorsports	Chevrolet	167	0	running	61	$7,525
35	21	14	John Andretti (R)	Hagan Racing	Chevrolet	164	0	engine	58	$11,450
36	38	90	Mike Wallace (R)	Donlavey Racing	Ford	139	0	engine	55	$7,375
37	29	27	Jimmy Spencer	Junior Johnson & Associates	Ford	69	0	crash	52	$7,300
38	18	4	Sterling Marlin	Morgan–McClure Motorsports	Chevrolet	56	0	crash	49	$17,260
39	41	12	Chuck Bown	Bobby Allison Motorsports	Ford	55	0	crash	46	$11,225
40	36	98	Derrike Cope	Cale Yarborough Motorsports	Ford	54	0	engine	43	$7,150
41	42	52	Bob Keselowski	Jimmy Means Racing	Ford	17	0	engine	40	$7,150
42	25	31	Ward Burton (R)	A.G. Dillard Motorsports	Chevrolet	16	0	crash	37	$7,150
Official race results

== Standings after the race ==
Drivers' Championship standings

	Pos	Driver	Points
	1	Ernie Irvan	2,130
	2	Dale Earnhardt	1,991 (-139)
	3	Rusty Wallace	1,835 (-295)
	4	Ken Schrader	1,775 (–355)
	5	Mark Martin	1,761 (–369)
2	6	Morgan Shepherd	1,627 (–503)
1	7	Ricky Rudd	1,581 (–549)
1	8	Michael Waltrip	1,578 (–552)
2	9	Lake Speed	1,567 (–563)
1	10	Kyle Petty	1,546 (–584)
Official driver's standings

- Note: Only the first 10 positions are included for the driver standings.

Previous race: 1994 Budweiser 500	NASCAR Winston Cup Series; 1994 season	Next race: 1994 Miller Genuine Draft 400 (Michigan)
