= Larry Hedrick =

American businessman and NASCAR team owner (1940–2020)

Larry Hedrick (December 12, 1940 – August 31, 2020) was an American businessman and former NASCAR team owner.

Born in North Carolina, in 1976, he formed Statesville Auto Auction, which became one of the largest and most profitable auto sales businesses until it was sold to Manheim Auctions in 1993. Hedrick also owned and operated Larry Hedrick Motorsports, a NASCAR team that debuted in 1990 with driver Larry Pearson. The following season, Hedrick signed Kellogg's Corn Flakes for a limited schedule. Pearson was released at the end of the season in favor of Greg Sacks.

Manheim Auctions joined the team as sponsor for 1993 with Dick Trickle and Phil Parsons sharing driving duties. The following year, Hedrick signed former Xfinity series champion Joe Nemechek for a run at Rookie of the Year. Nemechek left at season's end to run his own team and was replaced by Ricky Craven. Craven would go on to win Rookie of the Year in 1995.

In 1996, Craven earned five top-10 finishes before accepting an offer from Hendrick Motorsports. Steve Grissom became the team's driver in 1997 and sat on the outside pole at the season opening Daytona 500, earning six top 10s through the season—the most for Hedrick. In 1999, sponsor Kodiak moved to Melling Racing, leaving the team in search of sponsorship. In 2000 the team thought it had sponsorship from Big Daddy's BBQ Sauce, but the sponsor defaulted on the terms of its contract and the team shut its doors.
