= 1994 Coca-Cola 600 =

11th race of the 1994 NASCAR Winston Cup Series

Race details
- Race 11 of 31 in the 1994 NASCAR Winston Cup Series
- The 1994 Coca-Cola 600 program cover, with artwork by NASCAR artist Sam Bass.
- Date: May 29, 1994
- Official name: 35th Annual Coca-Cola 600
- Location: Concord, North Carolina, Charlotte Motor Speedway
- Course: Permanent racing facility
- Course length: 1.5 miles (2.41 km)
- Distance: 400 laps, 600 mi (965.606 km)
- Average speed: 139.445 miles per hour (224.415 km/h)

Pole position
Driver	Jeff Gordon	Hendrick Motorsports
- Time: 29.762

Most laps led
Driver	Rusty Wallace	Penske Racing South
- Laps: 187

Winner
No. 24	Jeff Gordon	Hendrick Motorsports

Television in the United States
- Network: TBS
- Announcers: Ken Squier, Richard Petty

Radio in the United States
- Radio: Performance Racing Network

The 1994 Coca-Cola 600 was the 11th stock car race of the 1994 NASCAR Winston Cup Series season and the 35th iteration of the event. The race was held on Sunday, May 29, 1994, in Concord, North Carolina, at Charlotte Motor Speedway, a 1.5 miles (2.4 km) permanent quad-oval. The race took the scheduled 400 laps to complete. Gambling with a two-tire stop 20 laps from the end of the race, Hendrick Motorsports driver Jeff Gordon would manage to fend off the field for the final 20 laps of the race to take his first victory of the season and his first career win in a points-paying NASCAR Winston Cup Series race. To fill out the top three, Penske Racing South driver Rusty Wallace and owner-driver Geoff Bodine would finish second and third, respectively.

== Background ==
The layout of Charlotte Motor Speedway, the venue where the race was held.

Charlotte Motor Speedway is a motorsports complex located in Concord, North Carolina, United States 13 miles from Charlotte, North Carolina. The complex features a 1.5 miles (2.4 km) quad oval track that hosts NASCAR racing including the prestigious Coca-Cola 600 on Memorial Day weekend and the NEXTEL All-Star Challenge, as well as the UAW-GM Quality 500. The speedway was built in 1959 by Bruton Smith and is considered the home track for NASCAR with many race teams located in the Charlotte area. The track is owned and operated by Speedway Motorsports (SMI) with Marcus Smith (son of Bruton Smith) as track president.

=== Entry list ===
- (R) denotes rookie driver.

#	Driver	Team	Make
1	Rick Mast	Precision Products Racing	Ford
2	Rusty Wallace	Penske Racing South	Ford
02	Jeremy Mayfield (R)	Taylor Racing	Ford
3	Dale Earnhardt	Richard Childress Racing	Chevrolet
4	Sterling Marlin	Morgan–McClure Motorsports	Chevrolet
5	Terry Labonte	Hendrick Motorsports	Chevrolet
6	Mark Martin	Roush Racing	Ford
7	Geoff Bodine	Geoff Bodine Racing	Ford
8	Jeff Burton (R)	Stavola Brothers Racing	Ford
9	Rich Bickle	Melling Racing	Ford
10	Ricky Rudd	Rudd Performance Motorsports	Ford
11	Bill Elliott	Junior Johnson & Associates	Ford
12	Chuck Bown	Bobby Allison Motorsports	Ford
14	John Andretti (R)	Hagan Racing	Chevrolet
15	Lake Speed	Bud Moore Engineering	Ford
16	Ted Musgrave	Roush Racing	Ford
17	Darrell Waltrip	Darrell Waltrip Motorsports	Chevrolet
18	Dale Jarrett	Joe Gibbs Racing	Chevrolet
19	Loy Allen Jr. (R)	TriStar Motorsports	Ford
20	Randy LaJoie	Moroso Racing	Ford
21	Morgan Shepherd	Wood Brothers Racing	Ford
22	Bobby Labonte	Bill Davis Racing	Pontiac
23	Hut Stricklin	Travis Carter Enterprises	Ford
24	Jeff Gordon	Hendrick Motorsports	Chevrolet
25	Ken Schrader	Hendrick Motorsports	Chevrolet
26	Brett Bodine	King Racing	Ford
27	Jimmy Spencer	Junior Johnson & Associates	Ford
28	Ernie Irvan	Robert Yates Racing	Ford
29	Steve Grissom	Diamond Ridge Motorsports	Chevrolet
30	Michael Waltrip	Bahari Racing	Pontiac
31	Ward Burton	A.G. Dillard Motorsports	Chevrolet
32	Dick Trickle	Active Motorsports	Chevrolet
33	Harry Gant	Leo Jackson Motorsports	Chevrolet
40	Bobby Hamilton	SABCO Racing	Pontiac
41	Joe Nemechek (R)	Larry Hedrick Motorsports	Chevrolet
42	Kyle Petty	SABCO Racing	Pontiac
43	Wally Dallenbach Jr.	Petty Enterprises	Pontiac
44	Bobby Hillin Jr.	Charles Hardy Racing	Ford
47	Billy Standridge (R)	Johnson Standridge Racing	Ford
52	Brad Teague	Jimmy Means Racing	Ford
55	Jimmy Hensley	RaDiUs Motorsports	Ford
71	Dave Marcis	Marcis Auto Racing	Chevrolet
75	Todd Bodine	Butch Mock Motorsports	Ford
77	Greg Sacks	U.S. Motorsports Inc.	Ford
89	Jim Sauter	Mueller Brothers Racing	Ford
90	Mike Wallace (R)	Donlavey Racing	Ford
98	Derrike Cope	Cale Yarborough Motorsports	Ford

== Qualifying ==
Qualifying was split into two rounds. The first round was held on Wednesday, May 25, at 7:00 PM EST. Each driver would have one lap to set a time. During the first round, the top 25 drivers in the round would be guaranteed a starting spot in the race. If a driver was not able to guarantee a spot in the first round, they had the option to scrub their time from the first round and try and run a faster lap time in a second round qualifying run, held on Thursday, May 26, at 2:30 PM EST. As with the first round, each driver would have one lap to set a time. For this specific race, positions 26-40 would be decided on time, and depending on who needed it, a select amount of positions were given to cars who had not otherwise qualified but were high enough in owner's points; up to two were given. If needed, a past champion who did not qualify on either time or provisionals could use a champion's provisional, adding one more spot to the field.

Jeff Gordon, driving for Hendrick Motorsports, won the pole, setting a time of 29.762 and an average speed of 181.439 mph (291.998 km/h) in the first round.

Four drivers would fail to qualify.

=== Full qualifying results ===
Pos.	#	Driver	Team	Make	Time	Speed
1	24	Jeff Gordon	Hendrick Motorsports	Chevrolet	29.762	181.439
2	41	Joe Nemechek (R)	Larry Hedrick Motorsports	Chevrolet	29.958	180.252
3	7	Geoff Bodine	Geoff Bodine Racing	Ford	29.994	180.036
4	25	Ken Schrader	Hendrick Motorsports	Chevrolet	30.028	179.832
5	26	Brett Bodine	King Racing	Ford	30.112	179.330
6	77	Greg Sacks	U.S. Motorsports Inc.	Ford	30.125	179.253
7	1	Rick Mast	Precision Products Racing	Ford	30.127	179.241
8	31	Ward Burton (R)	A.G. Dillard Motorsports	Chevrolet	30.225	178.660
9	14	John Andretti (R)	Hagan Racing	Chevrolet	30.245	178.542
10	5	Terry Labonte	Hendrick Motorsports	Chevrolet	30.247	178.530
11	6	Mark Martin	Roush Racing	Ford	30.252	178.501
12	43	Wally Dallenbach Jr.	Petty Enterprises	Pontiac	30.255	178.483
13	10	Ricky Rudd	Rudd Performance Motorsports	Ford	30.268	178.406
14	28	Ernie Irvan	Robert Yates Racing	Ford	30.269	178.400
15	8	Jeff Burton (R)	Stavola Brothers Racing	Ford	30.287	178.294
16	18	Dale Jarrett	Joe Gibbs Racing	Chevrolet	30.288	178.288
17	21	Morgan Shepherd	Wood Brothers Racing	Ford	30.337	178.000
18	33	Harry Gant	Leo Jackson Motorsports	Chevrolet	30.396	177.655
19	02	Jeremy Mayfield (R)	Taylor Racing	Ford	30.398	177.643
20	12	Chuck Bown	Bobby Allison Motorsports	Ford	30.403	177.614
Failed to lock in Round 1
21	2	Rusty Wallace	Penske Racing South	Ford	30.420	177.515
22	98	Derrike Cope	Cale Yarborough Motorsports	Ford	30.421	177.509
23	40	Bobby Hamilton	SABCO Racing	Pontiac	30.442	177.387
24	3	Dale Earnhardt	Richard Childress Racing	Chevrolet	30.457	177.299
25	22	Bobby Labonte	Bill Davis Racing	Pontiac	30.459	177.288
26	9	Rich Bickle	Melling Racing	Ford	30.503	177.032
27	20	Randy LaJoie	Moroso Racing	Ford	30.503	177.032
28	29	Steve Grissom (R)	Diamond Ridge Motorsports	Chevrolet	30.515	176.962
29	17	Darrell Waltrip	Darrell Waltrip Motorsports	Chevrolet	30.522	176.922
30	30	Michael Waltrip	Bahari Racing	Pontiac	30.537	176.835
31	75	Todd Bodine	Butch Mock Motorsports	Ford	30.537	176.835
32	4	Sterling Marlin	Morgan–McClure Motorsports	Chevrolet	30.571	176.638
33	27	Jimmy Spencer	Junior Johnson & Associates	Ford	30.594	176.505
34	47	Billy Standridge (R)	Johnson Standridge Racing	Ford	30.617	176.373
35	90	Mike Wallace (R)	Donlavey Racing	Ford	30.644	176.217
36	32	Dick Trickle	Active Motorsports	Chevrolet	30.661	176.120
37	19	Loy Allen Jr. (R)	TriStar Motorsports	Ford	30.663	176.108
38	52	Brad Teague	Jimmy Means Racing	Ford	30.660	176.074
39	15	Lake Speed	Bud Moore Engineering	Ford	30.670	176.068
40	23	Hut Stricklin	Travis Carter Enterprises	Ford	30.710	175.838
Provisionals
41	42	Kyle Petty	SABCO Racing	Pontiac	-*	-*
42	16	Ted Musgrave	Roush Racing	Ford	-*	-*
Champion's Provisional
43	11	Bill Elliott	Junior Johnson & Associates	Ford	-*	-*
Failed to qualify
44	55	Jimmy Hensley	RaDiUs Motorsports	Ford	-*	-*
45	71	Dave Marcis	Marcis Auto Racing	Chevrolet	-*	-*
46	44	Bobby Hillin Jr.	Charles Hardy Racing	Ford	-*	-*
47	89	Jim Sauter	Mueller Brothers Racing	Ford	-*	-*
Official first round qualifying results
Official starting lineup

== Race results ==
Fin	St	#	Driver	Team	Make	Laps	Led	Status	Pts	Winnings
1	1	24	Jeff Gordon	Hendrick Motorsports	Chevrolet	400	16	running	180	$196,500
2	21	2	Rusty Wallace	Penske Racing South	Ford	400	187	running	180	$88,075
3	3	7	Geoff Bodine	Geoff Bodine Racing	Ford	400	101	running	170	$75,500
4	16	18	Dale Jarrett	Joe Gibbs Racing	Chevrolet	400	9	running	165	$54,600
5	14	28	Ernie Irvan	Robert Yates Racing	Ford	400	23	running	160	$47,800
6	13	10	Ricky Rudd	Rudd Performance Motorsports	Ford	400	10	running	155	$28,700
7	18	33	Harry Gant	Leo Jackson Motorsports	Chevrolet	399	0	running	146	$32,500
8	31	75	Todd Bodine	Butch Mock Motorsports	Ford	398	0	running	142	$26,400
9	24	3	Dale Earnhardt	Richard Childress Racing	Chevrolet	397	0	running	138	$37,950
10	30	30	Michael Waltrip	Bahari Racing	Pontiac	397	0	running	134	$26,800
11	37	19	Loy Allen Jr. (R)	TriStar Motorsports	Ford	397	0	running	130	$22,700
12	40	23	Hut Stricklin	Travis Carter Enterprises	Ford	396	0	running	127	$18,700
13	20	12	Chuck Bown	Bobby Allison Motorsports	Ford	396	0	running	124	$22,600
14	39	15	Lake Speed	Bud Moore Engineering	Ford	396	0	running	121	$24,500
15	32	4	Sterling Marlin	Morgan–McClure Motorsports	Chevrolet	395	0	running	118	$23,850
16	42	16	Ted Musgrave	Roush Racing	Ford	395	0	running	115	$18,950
17	23	40	Bobby Hamilton	SABCO Racing	Pontiac	394	0	running	112	$17,900
18	22	98	Derrike Cope	Cale Yarborough Motorsports	Ford	394	0	running	109	$13,040
19	33	27	Jimmy Spencer	Junior Johnson & Associates	Ford	394	0	running	106	$12,300
20	27	20	Randy LaJoie	Moroso Racing	Ford	393	0	running	103	$9,815
21	19	02	Jeremy Mayfield (R)	Taylor Racing	Ford	393	0	running	100	$9,300
22	43	11	Bill Elliott	Junior Johnson & Associates	Ford	393	0	running	97	$14,950
23	35	90	Mike Wallace (R)	Donlavey Racing	Ford	390	0	running	94	$10,525
24	4	25	Ken Schrader	Hendrick Motorsports	Chevrolet	388	0	running	91	$16,620
25	12	43	Wally Dallenbach Jr.	Petty Enterprises	Pontiac	384	0	running	88	$9,800
26	41	42	Kyle Petty	SABCO Racing	Pontiac	379	0	running	85	$18,400
27	6	77	Greg Sacks	U.S. Motorsports Inc.	Ford	378	0	running	82	$7,950
28	17	21	Morgan Shepherd	Wood Brothers Racing	Ford	354	0	running	79	$17,110
29	15	8	Jeff Burton (R)	Stavola Brothers Racing	Ford	349	0	running	76	$13,080
30	29	17	Darrell Waltrip	Darrell Waltrip Motorsports	Chevrolet	336	0	running	73	$12,850
31	7	1	Rick Mast	Precision Products Racing	Ford	276	46	vibration	75	$13,350
32	11	6	Mark Martin	Roush Racing	Ford	270	0	handling	67	$18,450
33	2	41	Joe Nemechek (R)	Larry Hedrick Motorsports	Chevrolet	261	0	accident	64	$13,050
34	26	9	Rich Bickle	Melling Racing	Ford	235	0	handling	61	$6,500
35	10	5	Terry Labonte	Hendrick Motorsports	Chevrolet	220	0	accident	58	$16,750
36	9	14	John Andretti (R)	Hagan Racing	Chevrolet	220	0	crankshaft	55	$11,050
37	8	31	Ward Burton (R)	A.G. Dillard Motorsports	Chevrolet	189	0	accident	52	$6,850
38	36	32	Dick Trickle	Active Motorsports	Chevrolet	186	0	accident	49	$6,325
39	28	29	Steve Grissom (R)	Diamond Ridge Motorsports	Chevrolet	174	0	accident	46	$6,300
40	25	22	Bobby Labonte	Bill Davis Racing	Pontiac	156	0	rear end	43	$10,275
41	38	52	Brad Teague	Jimmy Means Racing	Ford	148	0	rocker arm	40	$6,275
42	5	26	Brett Bodine	King Racing	Ford	147	8	accident	42	$8,975
43	34	47	Billy Standridge (R)	Johnson Standridge Racing	Ford	126	0	overheating	34	$6,275
Official race results

== Standings after the race ==
Drivers' Championship standings

	Pos	Driver	Points
	1	Ernie Irvan	1,799
	2	Dale Earnhardt	1,737 (-62)
3	3	Rusty Wallace	1,470 (-329)
	4	Ken Schrader	1,440 (–359)
2	5	Mark Martin	1,436 (–363)
1	6	Morgan Shepherd	1,374 (–425)
1	7	Ricky Rudd	1,370 (–429)
1	8	Lake Speed	1,346 (–453)
1	9	Ted Musgrave	1,301 (–498)
2	10	Michael Waltrip	1,297 (–502)
Official driver's standings

- Note: Only the first 10 positions are included for the driver standings.

Previous race: 1994 Save Mart Supermarkets 300	NASCAR Winston Cup Series; 1994 season	Next race: 1994 Budweiser 500
