= 1998 Coca-Cola 600 =

Race details
- Race 11 of 33 in the 1998 NASCAR Winston Cup Series
- Date: May 24, 1998
- Location: Charlotte Motor Speedway, Concord, North Carolina
- Course: Permanent racing facility
- Course length: 1.5 miles (2.4 km)
- Distance: 400 laps, 600 mi (965.606 km)
- Weather: Temperatures averaging around 72.7 °F (22.6 °C); wind speeds up to 9.2 miles per hour (14.8 km/h)
- Average speed: 136.424 mph (219.553 km/h)

Pole position
Driver	Jeff Gordon	Hendrick Motorsports

Most laps led
Driver	Mark Martin	Roush Racing
- Laps: 164

Winner
No. 24	Jeff Gordon	Hendrick Motorsports

Television in the United States
- Network: TBS
- Announcers: Eli Gold, Ken Squier, Buddy Baker, & Geoff Bodine

The 1998 Coca-Cola 600, the 39th running of the event, was a NASCAR Winston Cup Series race held on May 24, 1998 at Charlotte Motor Speedway in Charlotte, North Carolina. Contested at 400 laps on the 1.5 mile (2.4 km) speedway, it was the 11th race of the 1998 NASCAR Winston Cup Series season. Jeff Gordon of Hendrick Motorsports won the race.

Elliott Sadler made his NASCAR Winston Cup Series debut in this event.

Jeff Gordon managed to take over the championship lead from Jeremy Mayfield after the event was resolved.

== Background ==
Charlotte Motor Speedway is a motorsports complex located in Concord, North Carolina, United States. It is 13 miles away from Charlotte, North Carolina. The complex features a 1.5 miles (2.4 km) quad oval track that hosts NASCAR racing such as the prestigious Coca-Cola 600 on Memorial Day weekend, The Winston, and the UAW-GM Quality 500. The speedway was built in 1959 by Bruton Smith and is considered the home track for NASCAR with many race teams located in the Charlotte area. The track is owned and operated by Speedway Motorsports Inc. (SMI).

=== Entry list ===
No	Driver	Team	Manufacturer
07	Dan Pardus	Midwest Transit Racing	Chevrolet
1	Darrell Waltrip	Dale Earnhardt, Inc.	Chevrolet
2	Rusty Wallace	Penske–Kranefuss Racing	Ford
3	Dale Earnhardt	Richard Childress Racing	Chevrolet
4	Bobby Hamilton	Morgan–McClure Motorsports	Chevrolet
5	Terry Labonte	Hendrick Motorsports	Chevrolet
6	Mark Martin	Roush Racing	Ford
7	Geoff Bodine	Mattei Motorsports	Ford
8	Hut Stricklin	Stavola Brothers Racing	Chevrolet
9	Lake Speed	Melling Racing	Ford
10	Ricky Rudd	Rudd Performance Motorsports	Ford
11	Brett Bodine	Brett Bodine Racing	Ford
12	Jeremy Mayfield	Penske–Kranefuss Racing	Ford
13	Jerry Nadeau	Elliott–Marino Racing	Ford
16	Ted Musgrave	Roush Racing	Ford
18	Bobby Labonte	Joe Gibbs Racing	Pontiac
21	Michael Waltrip	Wood Brothers Racing	Ford
22	Ward Burton	Bill Davis Racing	Pontiac
23	Jimmy Spencer	Travis Carter Enterprises	Ford
24	Jeff Gordon	Hendrick Motorsports	Chevrolet
26	Johnny Benson Jr.	Roush Racing	Ford
28	Kenny Irwin Jr.	Yates Racing	Ford
30	Derrike Cope	Bahari Racing	Pontiac
31	Mike Skinner	Richard Childress Racing	Chevrolet
33	Ken Schrader	Andy Petree Racing	Chevrolet
35	Todd Bodine	ISM Racing	Pontiac
36	Ernie Irvan	MB2 Motorsports	Pontiac
40	Sterling Marlin	Team SABCO	Chevrolet
41	Steve Grissom	Larry Hedrick Motorsports	Chevrolet
42	Joe Nemechek	Team SABCO	Chevrolet
43	John Andretti	Petty Enterprises	Pontiac
44	Kyle Petty	PE2 Motorsports	Pontiac
46	Morgan Shepherd	Team SABCO	Chevrolet
47	Billy Standridge	Standridge Motorsports	Ford
50	Randy LaJoie	Hendrick Motorsports	Chevrolet
71	Dave Marcis	Marcis Auto Racing	Chevrolet
75	Rick Mast	Butch Mock Motorsports	Ford
77	Robert Pressley	Jasper Motorsports	Ford
78	Gary Bradberry	Triad Motorsports	Ford
81	Kenny Wallace	FILMAR Racing	Ford
85	Randy MacDonald	Manison Motorsports	Ford
88	Dale Jarrett	Yates Racing	Ford
90	Dick Trickle	Donlavey Racing	Ford
91	Kevin Lepage	LJ Racing	Chevrolet
92	Elliott Sadler	Diamond Ridge Motorsports	Chevrolet
94	Bill Elliott	Elliott–Marino Racing	Ford
95	Andy Hillenburg	Sadler Brothers Racing	Chevrolet
96	David Green	American Equipment Racing	Chevrolet
97	Chad Little	Roush Racing	Ford
98	Rich Bickle	Cale Yarborough Motorsports	Ford
99	Jeff Burton	Roush Racing	Ford

== Race Results ==
Pos	Grid	No	Driver	Team	Manufacturer	Laps
1	1	24	Jeff Gordon	Hendrick Motorsports	Chevrolet	400
2	4	2	Rusty Wallace	Penske–Kranefuss Racing	Ford	400
3	6	18	Bobby Labonte	Joe Gibbs Racing	Pontiac	400
4	5	6	Mark Martin	Roush Racing	Ford	400
5	10	88	Dale Jarrett	Yates Racing	Ford	400
6	26	42	Joe Nemechek	Team SABCO	Chevrolet	400
7	3	43	John Andretti	Petty Enterprises	Pontiac	400
8	38	99	Jeff Burton	Roush Racing	Ford	400
9	39	26	Johnny Benson Jr.	Roush Racing	Ford	400
10	14	33	Ken Schrader	Andy Petree Racing	Chevrolet	399
11	18	36	Ernie Irvan	MB2 Motorsports	Pontiac	399
12	41	16	Ted Musgrave	Roush Racing	Ford	399
13	21	23	Jimmy Spencer	Travis Carter Enterprises	Ford	399
14	33	94	Bill Elliott	Elliott–Marino Racing	Ford	399
15	30	40	Sterling Marlin	Team SABCO	Chevrolet	399
16	27	77	Robert Pressley	Jasper Motorsports	Ford	399
17	43	1	Darrell Waltrip	Dale Earnhardt, Inc.	Chevrolet	399
18	37	21	Michael Waltrip	Wood Brothers Racing	Ford	399
19	12	12	Jeremy Mayfield	Penske–Kranefuss Racing	Ford	398
20	40	4	Bobby Hamilton	Morgan–McClure Motorsports	Chevrolet	398
21	7	90	Dick Trickle	Donlavey Racing	Ford	398
22	32	11	Brett Bodine	Brett Bodine Racing	Ford	398
23	13	7	Geoff Bodine	Mattei Motorsports	Ford	398
24	16	98	Rich Bickle	Cale Yarborough Motorsports	Ford	398
25	42	81	Kenny Wallace	FILMAR Racing	Ford	398
26	9	75	Rick Mast	Butch Mock Motorsports	Ford	398
27	19	9	Lake Speed	Melling Racing	Ford	397
28	20	35	Todd Bodine	ISM Racing	Pontiac	397
29	34	31	Mike Skinner	Richard Childress Racing	Chevrolet	397
30	29	44	Kyle Petty	PE2 Motorsports	Pontiac	396
31	35	10	Ricky Rudd	Rudd Performance Motorsports	Ford	396
32	23	41	Steve Grissom	Larry Hedrick Motorsports	Chevrolet	396
33	25	30	Derrike Cope	Bahari Racing	Pontiac	395
34	2	22	Ward Burton	Bill Davis Racing	Pontiac	395
35	24	97	Chad Little	Roush Racing	Ford	386
36	15	91	Kevin Lepage	LJ Racing	Chevrolet	386
37	8	78	Gary Bradberry	Triad Motorsports	Ford	368
38	11	50	Randy LaJoie	Hendrick Motorsports	Chevrolet	336
39	28	3	Dale Earnhardt	Richard Childress Racing	Chevrolet	336
40	22	13	Jerry Nadeau	Elliott–Marino Racing	Ford	331
41	36	5	Terry Labonte	Hendrick Motorsports	Chevrolet	329
42	31	92	Elliott Sadler	Diamond Ridge Motorsports	Chevrolet	208
43	17	96	David Green	American Equipment Racing	Chevrolet	134
Failed to Qualify
44	–	8	Hut Stricklin	Stavola Brothers Racing	Chevrolet	–
45	–	28	Kenny Irwin Jr.	Yates Racing	Ford	–
46	–	95	Andy Hillenburg	Sadler Brothers Racing	Chevrolet	–
47	–	71	Dave Marcis	Marcis Auto Racing	Chevrolet	–
48	–	85	Randy MacDonald	Manison Motorsports	Ford	–
49	–	07	Dan Pardus	Midwest Transit Racing	Chevrolet	–
50	–	47	Billy Standridge	Standridge Motorsports	Ford	–
51	–	46	Morgan Shepherd	Team SABCO	Chevrolet	–
Race Results

== Race statistics ==
- Time of race: 4:23:53
- Average Speed: 136.424 miles per hour (219.553 km/h)
- Pole Speed: 182.976
- Cautions: 8 for 49 laps
- Margin of Victory: 0.41 sec
- Lead changes: 33
- Percent of race run under caution: 12.2%
- Average green flag run: 39 laps
