= 1997 Coca-Cola 600 =

Auto race run in North Carolina in 1997

Race details
- Race 11 of 32 in the 1997 NASCAR Winston Cup Series
- Date: May 25, 1997
- Location: Charlotte Motor Speedway, Concord, North Carolina
- Course: Permanent racing facility
- Course length: 1.5 miles (2.414 km)
- Distance: 333 laps, 499.5 mi (803.867 km)
- Scheduled distance: 400 laps, 600 mi (965.606 km)
- Weather: Temperatures averaging around 72.4 °F (22.4 °C); wind speeds up to 17.2 miles per hour (27.7 km/h)
- Average speed: 136.745 mph (220.070 km/h)

Pole position
Driver	Jeff Gordon	Hendrick Motorsports
- Time: 29.300

Most laps led
Driver	Ernie Irvan	Robert Yates Racing
- Laps: 83

Winner
No. 24	Jeff Gordon	Hendrick Motorsports

Television in the United States
- Network: TBS
- Announcers: Ken Squier, Buddy Baker, Dick Berggren & Geoff Bodine

The 1997 Coca-Cola 600, the 38th running of the event, was a NASCAR Winston Cup Series race held on May 25, 1997 at Charlotte Motor Speedway in Charlotte, North Carolina. Contested over 333 laps – shortened from 400 laps due to a rain delay and a 1 a.m. curfew – on the 1.5-mile (2.4-kilometre) speedway, it was the 11th race of the 1997 NASCAR Winston Cup Series season. Jeff Gordon of Hendrick Motorsports won the race.

On the day of the race, 0.25 inches (6.4 millimetres) of precipitation were recorded around the speedway.

== Background ==
Charlotte Motor Speedway is a motorsports complex located in Concord, North Carolina, United States, around 13 miles (21 kilometres) from Charlotte, North Carolina. The complex features a 1.5-mile (2.4-kilometre) quad oval track that hosts NASCAR racing including the prestigious Coca-Cola 600 on Memorial Day weekend and The Winston, as well as the UAW-GM Quality 500. The speedway was built in 1959 by Bruton Smith and is considered the home track for NASCAR with many race teams located in the Charlotte area. The track is owned and operated by Speedway Motorsports Inc. (SMI).

=== Entry list ===
No	Driver	Team	Manufacturer
1	Morgan Shepherd	Precision Products Racing	Pontiac
2	Rusty Wallace	Penske Racing South	Ford
3	Dale Earnhardt	Richard Childress Racing	Chevrolet
4	Sterling Marlin	Morgan–McClure Motorsports	Chevrolet
5	Terry Labonte	Hendrick Motorsports	Chevrolet
6	Mark Martin	Roush Racing	Ford
7	Todd Bodine	Geoff Bodine Racing	Ford
8	Hut Stricklin	Stavola Brothers Racing	Ford
9	Lake Speed	Melling Racing	Ford
10	Ricky Rudd	Rudd Performance Motorsports	Ford
11	Brett Bodine	Brett Bodine Racing	Ford
16	Ted Musgrave	Roush Racing	Ford
17	Darrell Waltrip	Darrell Waltrip Motorsports	Chevrolet
18	Bobby Labonte	Joe Gibbs Racing	Pontiac
19	Gary Bradberry	TriStar Motorsports	Ford
21	Michael Waltrip	Wood Brothers Racing	Ford
22	Ward Burton	Bill Davis Racing	Pontiac
23	Jimmy Spencer	Travis Carter Enterprises	Ford
24	Jeff Gordon	Hendrick Motorsports	Chevrolet
25	Ricky Craven	Hendrick Motorsports	Chevrolet
28	Ernie Irvan	Yates Racing	Ford
29	Jeff Green	Diamond Ridge Motorsports	Chevrolet
30	Johnny Benson Jr.	Bahari Racing	Pontiac
31	Mike Skinner	Richard Childress Racing	Chevrolet
33	Ken Schrader	Andy Petree Racing	Chevrolet
36	Derrike Cope	MB2 Motorsports	Pontiac
37	Jeremy Mayfield	Kranefuss-Haas Racing	Ford
40	Robby Gordon	Team SABCO	Chevrolet
41	Steve Grissom	Larry Hedrick Motorsports	Chevrolet
42	Joe Nemechek	Team SABCO	Chevrolet
43	Bobby Hamilton	Petty Enterprises	Pontiac
44	Kyle Petty	PE2 Motorsports	Pontiac
46	Wally Dallenbach Jr.	Team SABCO	Chevrolet
71	Dave Marcis	Marcis Auto Racing	Chevrolet
75	Rick Mast	Butch Mock Motorsports	Ford
77	Bobby Hillin Jr.	Jasper Motorsports	Ford
78	Billy Standridge	Triad Motorsports	Ford
81	Kenny Wallace	FILMAR Racing	Ford
88	Dale Jarrett	Yates Racing	Ford
90	Dick Trickle	Donlavey Racing	Ford
91	Mike Wallace	LJ Racing	Chevrolet
94	Bill Elliott	Bill Elliott Racing	Ford
95	Ed Berrier	Sadler Brothers Racing	Chevrolet
96	David Green	American Equipment Racing	Chevrolet
97	Chad Little	Mark Rypien Motorsports	Pontiac
98	John Andretti	Cale Yarborough Motorsports	Ford
99	Jeff Burton	Roush Racing	Ford

== Race results ==
Pos	No	Driver	Team	Manufacturer	Laps
1	24	Jeff Gordon	Hendrick Motorsports	Chevrolet	333
2	2	Rusty Wallace	Penske Racing South	Ford	333
3	6	Mark Martin	Roush Racing	Ford	333
4	94	Bill Elliott	Bill Elliott Racing	Ford	333
5	99	Jeff Burton	Roush Racing	Ford	333
6	18	Bobby Labonte	Joe Gibbs Racing	Pontiac	333
7	3	Dale Earnhardt	Richard Childress Racing	Chevrolet	333
8	5	Terry Labonte	Hendrick Motorsports	Chevrolet	333
9	1	Morgan Shepherd	Precision Products Racing	Pontiac	333
10	10	Ricky Rudd	Rudd Performance Motorsports	Ford	333
11	41	Steve Grissom	Larry Hedrick Motorsports	Chevrolet	333
12	36	Derrike Cope	MB2 Motorsports	Pontiac	333
13	28	Ernie Irvan	Yates Racing	Ford	333
14	44	Kyle Petty	PE2 Motorsports	Pontiac	333
15	30	Johnny Benson Jr.	Bahari Racing	Pontiac	333
16	96	David Green	American Equipment Racing	Chevrolet	333
17	21	Michael Waltrip	Wood Brothers Racing	Ford	333
18	23	Jimmy Spencer	Travis Carter Enterprises	Ford	332
19	42	Joe Nemechek	Team SABCO	Chevrolet	332
20	75	Rick Mast	Butch Mock Motorsports	Ford	332
21	17	Darrell Waltrip	Darrell Waltrip Motorsports	Chevrolet	332
22	29	Jeff Green	Diamond Ridge Motorsports	Chevrolet	332
23	16	Ted Musgrave	Roush Racing	Ford	332
24	9	Lake Speed	Melling Racing	Ford	332
25	8	Hut Stricklin	Stavola Brothers Racing	Ford	332
26	11	Brett Bodine	Brett Bodine Racing	Ford	332
27	88	Dale Jarrett	Yates Racing	Ford	332
28	37	Jeremy Mayfield	Kranefuss-Haas Racing	Ford	331
29	43	Bobby Hamilton	Petty Enterprises	Pontiac	331
30	98	John Andretti	Cale Yarborough Motorsports	Ford	331
31	19	Gary Bradberry	TriStar Motorsports	Ford	331
32	78	Billy Standridge	Triad Motorsports	Ford	328
33	90	Dick Trickle	Donlavey Racing	Ford	323
34	31	Mike Skinner	Richard Childress Racing	Chevrolet	292
35	46	Wally Dallenbach Jr.	Team SABCO	Chevrolet	246
36	22	Ward Burton	Bill Davis Racing	Pontiac	239
37	25	Ricky Craven	Hendrick Motorsports	Chevrolet	233
38	33	Ken Schrader	Andy Petree Racing	Chevrolet	231
39	81	Kenny Wallace	FILMAR Racing	Ford	192
40	4	Sterling Marlin	Morgan–McClure Motorsports	Chevrolet	188
41	40	Robby Gordon	Team SABCO	Chevrolet	186
42	7	Todd Bodine	Geoff Bodine Racing	Ford	47
Race Results

== Race statistics ==
- Time of race: 3:39:10
- Average speed: 136.745 miles per hour (220.070 km/h)
- Pole speed: 184.300 miles per hour (296.602 km/h)
- Cautions: 7 for 50 laps
- Margin of victory: 0.468 seconds
- Lead changes: 27
- Percent of race run under caution: 15%
- Average green flag run: 35.4 laps
