= Larry Hedrick Motorsports =

NASCAR team

Hedrick Motorsports
- Owner: Larry Hedrick
- Principal(s): Crew chiefs and managers: Harry Hyde, Waddell Wilson, Mike Hill, Dennis Connor, Doug Richert, Charley Pressley, Tim Brewer
- Base: Statesville, North Carolina
- Series: Winston Cup, Busch Series
- Race drivers: Dave Marcis, Dick Trickle, Ricky Craven, Greg Sacks, Hut Stricklin Steve Grissom, Joe Nemechek, David Green, Derrick Cope
- Manufacturer: Chevrolet, Ford (1 race)
- Opened: 1990
- Closed: 2001

Career
- Drivers' Championships: 0 (best finish: 22nd)
- Race victories: 0 (best finish: 3rd)

Larry Hedrick Motorsports (LHM) was a NASCAR team. It was owned by businessman Larry Hedrick and always fielded the No. 41 Chevrolet in both the Winston Cup and the Busch Series. The team ran from 1990 until its closure in 2001.

The team is not related to Hendrick Motorsports despite sharing similar last name.

== Beginnings ==
LHM made its debut at the 1990 Bud 500 at Bristol Motor Speedway. Larry Pearson was the driver, qualifying 26th and finishing 14th. Pearson ran three more races with the team that season, never finishing lower than 19th.

The two teamed up again in 1991, running a limited schedule with Kellogg's and Jasper Engines & Transmissions sponsoring, with Robert "Boobie" Harrington stepping in as crew chief after the team parted ways with crew chief Jeffrey Ellis, moving operations from Ellis' North Wilkesboro based shop to Harrington's Kannapolis facility.

After signing a sponsorship deal for 1992 with Kellogg's Corn Flakes, the team parted ways with Pearson & Harrington, bringing in Greg Sacks as the team's (first full-time) driver, team manager Harry Hyde, & crew chief Dennis Connor. The team was moved to Statesville, operating out of Hedrick's 80-acre Statesville Auto Auction facility.

Things started off well, as Sacks put together five top-fifteen finishes as well as a seventh place qualifying effort at the TranSouth 500. Performance never improved and at the urging of team manager Harry Hyde, Sacks was replaced by long-time independent Dave Marcis, who hired Jim Sauter to drive for his racing team while he drove the 41 car. In a seven-race stretch, Marcis' best finish was 18th at the Southern 500. Sacks returned at the AC Delco 500 for a 33rd-place finish. Hut Stricklin finished out the last two races of the year. For the season-ending Hooters 500, the team switched from a Chevrolet Lumina to a Ford Thunderbird.

== Mid-1990s ==
In 1993, Manheim Auctions moved to full-time sponsorship, and Phil Parsons was hired to drive. Parsons finished eighth at North Carolina Motor Speedway, but was released in the final part of the year as Dick Trickle took his place, and had an outside-pole starting spot at the Slick 50 500, then followed it up with a fifth-place finish at Atlanta Motor Speedway. After Trickle left at the end of the year, LHM signed 1992 Busch Series champion Joe Nemechek to compete for Rookie of the Year, sponsored by Meineke, for 1994 Nemechek had two consecutive top-five qualifying runs and finished third at Pocono Raceway. When they were unable to clinch the rookie crown, Nemechek left to run his own team, and Hedrick signed another Busch Series veteran to compete for Cup rookie honors, Ricky Craven, as well as Kodiak as a sponsor. They had one top-five and four top-tens, defeating Robert Pressley for Rookie of the year. Craven was rewarded with a share of ownership in the Hedrick operation, and responded with two pole positions and five top-tens in 1996. He ran up near the top of the points standings very early in the season, but suffered a horrific crash at the Winston Select 500. Although he survived with no major injuries, his performance slipped after that, and many attribute that to a lack of confidence following that wreck. Craven left for Hendrick Motorsports at the end of the 1996 season.

== Final years ==
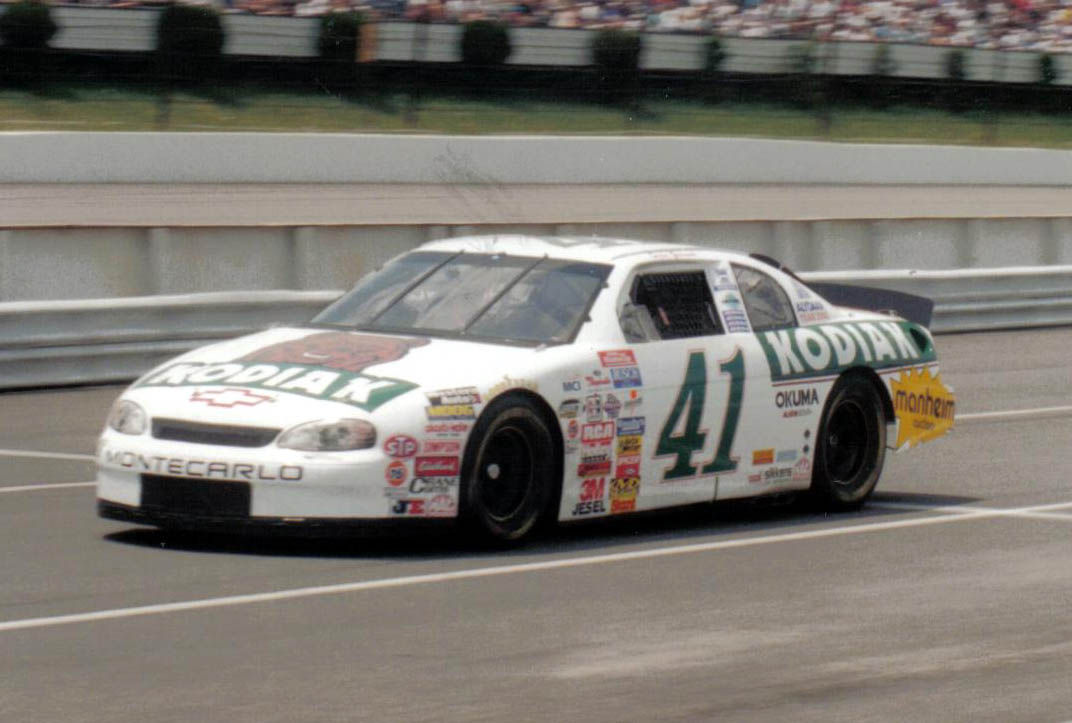
The paint scheme that ran from 1997-1999.

Craven was replaced by Steve Grissom to pilot the 41 ride for 1997. Grissom qualified on the outside pole at the season-opening Daytona 500, and garnered six top-ten finishes throughout the season. The momentum did not carry over into 1998, and Grissom was released after the fall Bristol race. David Green and Rick Wilson shared the driving duties for the balance of the season, with Green getting the nod to drive in 1999. Green struggled, missing two races, and finished no higher than 18th. As the season came to a close, Green left for Tyler Jet Motorsports, and Trickle returned to the team. He DNQ'd for all but one of the races he attempted, and was replaced by Derrike Cope for three races, until Gary Bradberry finished out the season.

With no driver for 2000 and Kodiak leaving the team, Hedrick decided to hire journeyman Rick Mast to drive. After a long search, LHM signed Big Daddy's BBQ Sauce as sponsor. The team struggled at first, but when Mast left for A.J. Foyt Racing, many questions began surrounding the organization. It was soon revealed that Big Daddy's had neglected to pay their sponsorship fees, and had instead given Hedrick 11 million shares of stock in the company. Hedrick tried to get a cash deal with New Holland as well as ordering Big Daddy's to pay their money, with neither working out. The stocks were later proven to be worthless. During this time, Bradberry returned for a three-race deal, but the team took the rest of the year off because of the sponsorship problems. After no other sponsorship opportunities came up in 2001, Hedrick sold the team.

Hedrick died on August 31, 2020, at the age of 79.

== Driver history ==
- Larry Pearson (1990–91)
- Greg Sacks (1992)
- Dave Marcis (1992)
- Hut Stricklin (1992, Phoenix and Atlanta only)
- Phil Parsons (1993)
- Dick Trickle (1993, 1999)
- Joe Nemechek (1994)
- Ricky Craven (1995–96)
- Steve Grissom (1997–98)
- David Green (1998–99)
- Derrike Cope (1999)
- Gary Bradberry (1999–2000)
- Rick Mast (2000)

== Motorsports career results ==
=== Winston Cup ===
(key) (Bold – Pole position awarded by qualifying time. Italics – Pole position earned by points standings or practice time. * – Most laps led.)

==== Car No. 41 results ====
| Year | Driver | No. | Make | 1 | 2 | 3 | 4 | 5 | 6 | 7 | 8 | 9 | 10 | 11 | 12 | 13 | 14 | 15 | 16 | 17 | 18 | 19 | 20 | 21 | 22 | 23 | 24 | 25 | 26 | 27 | 28 | 29 | 30 | 31 | 32 | 33 | 34 | Owners | Pts |
|---|---|---|---|---|---|---|---|---|---|---|---|---|---|---|---|---|---|---|---|---|---|---|---|---|---|---|---|---|---|---|---|---|---|---|---|---|---|---|---|
| 1990 | Larry Pearson | 41 | Chevy | DAY | RCH | CAR | ATL | DAR | BRI | NWS | MAR | TAL | CLT | DOV | SON | POC | MCH | DAY | POC | TAL | GLN | MCH | BRI; 14 | DAR; 17 | RCH | DOV | MAR | NWS; DNQ | CLT; 19 | CAR; 19 | PHO | ATL | | | | | | 39th | 445 |
| 1991 | Larry Pearson | 41 | Chevy | DAY | RCH | CAR | ATL | DAR | BRI | NWS; DNQ | MAR | TAL; 41 | CLT; 41 | DOV | SON | POC; 32 | MCH; 20 | DAY; 21 | POC | TAL; 17 | GLN | MCH | BRI; DNQ | DAR; 30 | RCH; 36 | DOV; 30 | MAR | NWS | CLT; DNQ | CAR | PHO; 33 | ATL; 14 | | | | | | 38th | 848 |
| 1992 | Greg Sacks | 41 | Chevy | DAY; 14 | CAR; 34 | RCH; 32 | ATL; 31 | DAR; 28 | BRI; 13 | NWS; 21 | MAR; 12 | TAL; 35 | CLT; 16 | DOV; 19 | SON; 43 | POC; 11 | MCH; 14 | DAY; 26 | POC; 29 | TAL; 19 | GLN; 31 | MCH; 41 | | | | | | | | CAR; 33 | | | | | | | | 29th | 2482 |
| 1992 | Dave Marcis | 41 | Chevy | | | | | | | | | | | | | | | | | | | | BRI; 32 | DAR; 18 | RCH; 24 | DOV; 26 | MAR; 25 | NWS; 28 | CLT; 39 | | | | | | | | | 29th | 2482 |
| 1992 | Hut Stricklin | 41 | Chevy | | | | | | | | | | | | | | | | | | | | | | | | | | | | PHO; 15 | ATL; 41 | | | | | | 29th | 2482 |
| 1993 | Phil Parsons | 41 | Chevy | DAY; 22 | CAR; 8 | RCH; 16 | ATL; 39 | DAR; 36 | BRI; 31 | NWS; 18 | MAR; 20 | TAL; 19 | SON; 37 | CLT; 12 | DOV; 37 | POC; 14 | MCH; 13 | DAY; 25 | NHA; 39 | POC; 18 | TAL; 22 | GLN; 33 | MCH; 19 | BRI; 14 | DAR; 21 | RCH; 20 | DOV; 37 | MAR; 19 | | | | | | | | | | 28th | 2849 |
| 1993 | Dick Trickle | 41 | Chevy | | | | | | | | | | | | | | | | | | | | | | | | | | NWS; 30 | CLT; 22 | CAR; 9 | PHO; 31 | ATL; 5 | | | | | 28th | 2849 |
| 1994 | Joe Nemechek | 41 | Chevy | DAY; DNQ | CAR; 36 | RCH; 21 | ATL; 18 | DAR; 19 | BRI; 16 | NWS; DNQ | MAR; 22 | TAL; 42 | SON; 22 | CLT; 33 | DOV; 14 | POC; 32 | MCH; 7 | DAY; 39 | NHA; 19 | POC; 3 | TAL; 35 | IND; 20 | GLN; 8 | MCH; 21 | BRI; 29 | DAR; 42 | RCH; 28 | DOV; 36 | MAR; 22 | NWS; 34 | CLT; 11 | CAR; 17 | PHO; 25 | ATL; 23 | | | | 28th | 2673 |
| 1995 | Ricky Craven | 41 | Chevy | DAY; 16 | CAR; 16 | RCH; 38 | ATL; 12 | DAR; 42 | BRI; 29 | NWS; 33 | MAR; 18 | TAL; 17 | SON; 25 | CLT; 10 | DOV; 22 | POC; 26 | MCH; 33 | DAY; 22 | NHA; 31 | POC; 25 | TAL; 26 | IND; 31 | GLN; 10 | MCH; 7 | BRI; 32 | DAR; 18 | RCH; 29 | DOV; 22 | MAR; 35 | NWS; 21 | CLT; 25 | CAR; 8 | PHO; 24 | ATL; 30 | | | | 25th | 2883 |
| 1996 | Ricky Craven | 41 | Chevy | DAY; 13 | CAR; 3 | RCH; 17 | ATL; 12 | DAR; 3 | BRI; 9 | NWS; 7 | **MAR**; 12 | TAL; 36 | SON; 31 | CLT; 37 | DOV; 14 | POC; 17 | MCH; 29 | DAY; 22 | **NHA**; 26 | POC; 20 | TAL; 19 | IND; 34 | GLN; 36 | MCH; 18 | BRI; 21 | DAR; 42 | RCH; 28 | DOV; 35 | MAR; 26 | NWS; 22 | CLT; 5 | CAR; 22 | PHO; 34 | ATL; 35 | | | | 22nd | 3078 |
| 1997 | Steve Grissom | 41 | Chevy | DAY; 40 | CAR; 24 | RCH; 11 | ATL; 33 | DAR; DNQ | TEX; 10 | BRI; 32 | MAR; 20 | SON; 17 | TAL; 41 | CLT; 11 | DOV; 24 | POC; 18 | MCH; 38 | CAL; 17 | DAY; 38 | NHA; 4 | POC; 30 | IND; 26 | GLN; 9 | MCH; 25 | BRI; 5 | DAR; 21 | RCH; 12 | NHA; 4 | DOV; 21 | MAR; 40 | CLT; 13 | TAL; 32 | CAR; 24 | PHO; 8 | ATL; 28 | | | 23rd | 3061 |
| 1998 | Steve Grissom | 41 | Chevy | DAY; 28 | CAR; 20 | LVS; 39 | ATL; 16 | DAR; 19 | BRI; 16 | TEX; 10 | MAR; 25 | TAL; 16 | CAL; 30 | CLT; 32 | DOV; 32 | RCH; 39 | MCH; 41 | POC; 23 | SON; 10 | NHA; 43 | POC; 39 | IND; 23 | GLN; 38 | MCH; 33 | BRI; DNQ | NHA; 25 | DAR; 20 | RCH; 17 | DOV; DNQ | | | | | | | | | 37th | 2228 |
| 1998 | David Green | 41 | Chevy | | | | | | | | | | | | | | | | | | | | | | | | | | | MAR; DNQ | CLT; 43 | | | PHO; 37 | CAR; 26 | ATL; 41 | | 37th | 2228 |
| 1998 | Rick Wilson | 41 | Chevy | | | | | | | | | | | | | | | | | | | | | | | | | | | | | TAL; DNQ | DAY; DNQ | | | | | 37th | 2228 |
| 1999 | David Green | 41 | Chevy | DAY; DNQ | CAR; 18 | LVS; 27 | ATL; 21 | DAR; 42 | TEX; 26 | BRI; 33 | MAR; 26 | TAL; 33 | CAL; 25 | RCH; 43 | CLT; 27 | DOV; 18 | MCH; 35 | POC; 38 | SON; 36 | DAY; 33 | NHA; DNQ | POC; 41 | IND; 20 | GLN; 37 | MCH; 32 | BRI; 25 | DAR; 42 | RCH; 33 | | | | | | | | | | 41st | 1888 |
| 1999 | Dick Trickle | 41 | Chevy | | | | | | | | | | | | | | | | | | | | | | | | | | NHA; DNQ | DOV; DNQ | MAR; DNQ | CLT; 41 | | | | | | 41st | 1888 |
| 1999 | Derrike Cope | 41 | Chevy | | | | | | | | | | | | | | | | | | | | | | | | | | | | | | TAL; 37 | CAR; 25 | PHO; 43 | HOM; DNQ | | 41st | 1888 |
| 1999 | Gary Bradberry | 41 | Chevy | | | | | | | | | | | | | | | | | | | | | | | | | | | | | | | | | | ATL; 35 | 41st | 1888 |
| 2000 | Rick Mast | 41 | Chevy | DAY; 28 | CAR; 33 | LVS; DNQ | ATL; 21 | DAR; 30 | BRI; 34 | | | | | | | | | | | | | | | | | | | | | | | | | | | | | 51st | 481 |
| 2000 | Gary Bradberry | 41 | Chevy | | | | | | | TEX; 41 | MAR; 33 | TAL; DNQ | CAL | RCH | CLT | DOV | MCH | POC | SON | DAY | NHA | POC | IND | GLN | MCH | BRI | DAR | RCH | NHA | DOV | MAR | CLT | TAL | CAR | PHO | HOM | ATL | 51st | 481 |

=== Busch Series ===
(key) (Bold – Pole position awarded by qualifying time. Italics – Pole position earned by points standings or practice time. * – Most laps led.)

==== Car No. 41 results ====
| Year | Team | No. | Make | 1 | 2 | 3 | 4 | 5 | 6 | 7 | 8 | 9 | 10 | 11 | 12 | 13 | 14 | 15 | 16 | 17 | 18 | 19 | 20 | 21 | 22 | 23 | 24 | 25 | 26 | 27 | 28 | 29 | 30 | 31 | 32 | Owners | Pts |
|---|---|---|---|---|---|---|---|---|---|---|---|---|---|---|---|---|---|---|---|---|---|---|---|---|---|---|---|---|---|---|---|---|---|---|---|---|---|
| 1999 | David Green | 41 | Chevy | DAY | CAR; DNQ | LVS; 22 | ATL | DAR; 7 | TEX; 22 | NSV | BRI; 33 | TAL; 10 | CAL; 14 | NHA | RCH; 16 | NZH | **CLT**; 14 | DOV; 4 | SBO | GLN | MLW | MYB | PPR | GTY | IRP | MCH; 14 | BRI; 19 | DAR; 40 | RCH; 7 | | CLT; 18 | CAR; 9 | MEM | PHO | HOM; 7 | 36th | 2032 |
| 1999 | David Green | 46 | Chevy | | | | | | | | | | | | | | | | | | | | | | | | | | | DOV; 7 | | | | | | 36th | 2032 |
