= 1999 Coca-Cola 600 =

Race details
- Race 12 of 34 in the 1999 NASCAR Winston Cup Series
- Layout of Lowe's Motor Speedway
- Date: May 30, 1999
- Location: Lowe's Motor Speedway, Concord, North Carolina
- Course: Permanent racing facility
- Course length: 1.5 miles (2.4 km)
- Distance: 400 laps, 600 mi (965.606 km)
- Weather: Temperatures averaging around 71.7 °F (22.1 °C); wind speeds up to 6.9 miles per hour (11.1 km/h)
- Average speed: 151.367 mph (243.602 km/h)

Pole position
Driver	Bobby Labonte	Joe Gibbs Racing

Most laps led
Driver	Jeff Burton	Roush Racing
- Laps: 198

Winner
No. 99	Jeff Burton	Roush Racing

Television in the United States
- Network: TBS
- Announcers: Ken Squier, Dick Berggren, & Buddy Baker

The 1999 Coca-Cola 600, the 40th running of the event, was a NASCAR Winston Cup Series race held on May 30, 1999 at Lowe's Motor Speedway in Concord, North Carolina. Contested at 400 laps on the 1.5 mile (2.4 km) speedway, it was the twelfth race of the 1999 NASCAR Winston Cup Series season.

The race was won by Jeff Burton, driving the #99 Exide Batteries Ford Taurus for Roush Racing, after starting second and leading nine times for a total of 198 laps, including the last 17. It was his third victory of six he recorded during the 1999 season and his first of two wins in the Coca-Cola 600 (he later won the event in 2001). He also won a $1 million bonus from Winston as part of their No Bull 5 competition.

There were two other noteworthy stories from the race, both involving rookie drivers. After winning several races in the Busch Series for his father’s team, Dale Earnhardt Jr. made his Winston Cup debut in the #8 Budweiser Chevrolet Monte Carlo. He finished the race in sixteenth place. Another rookie, Tony Stewart, participated in both the Indianapolis 500 and the Coca-Cola 600 in the same day. At Indianapolis, he ran ninth driving the #22 car for Tri-Star Motorsports. After the race he flew to Charlotte and started the #20 Home Depot Pontiac Grand Prix for Joe Gibbs Racing, bringing it home in fourth place. He was the third driver after John Andretti in 1994 and Robby Gordon in 1997 to do so; he repeated this feat in 2001 and ran the entire distance of both events.

== Background ==
Lowe's Motor Speedway, the track where the race was held.

Lowe's Motor Speedway is a motorsports complex located in Concord, North Carolina, United States 13 miles from Charlotte, North Carolina. The complex features a 1.5 miles (2.4 km) quad oval track that hosts NASCAR racing including the prestigious Coca-Cola 600 on Memorial Day weekend and The Winston, as well as the UAW-GM Quality 500. The speedway was built in 1959 by Bruton Smith and is considered the home track for NASCAR with many race teams located in the Charlotte area. The track is owned and operated by Speedway Motorsports Inc. (SMI) with Marcus G. Smith (son of Bruton Smith) as track president.

== Top 10 results ==
Pos	No.	Driver	Team	Manufacturer
1	99	Jeff Burton	Roush Racing	Ford
2	18	Bobby Labonte	Joe Gibbs Racing	Pontiac
3	6	Mark Martin	Roush Racing	Ford
4	20	Tony Stewart	Joe Gibbs Racing	Pontiac
5	88	Dale Jarrett	Robert Yates Racing	Ford
6	3	Dale Earnhardt	Richard Childress Racing	Chevrolet
7	33	Ken Schrader	Andy Petree Racing	Chevrolet
8	22	Ward Burton	Bill Davis Racing	Pontiac
9	31	Mike Skinner	Richard Childress Racing	Chevrolet
10	12	Jeremy Mayfield	Penske-Kranefuss Racing	Ford

== Race statistics ==
- Time of race: 3:57:50
- Average Speed: 151.367 miles per hour (243.602 km/h)
- Pole Speed: 185.23
- Cautions: 5 for 23 laps
- Margin of Victory: 0.574 sec
- Lead changes: 23
- Percent of race run under caution: 5.8%
- Average green flag run: 62.8 laps
