= Steve Grissom =

American racing driver

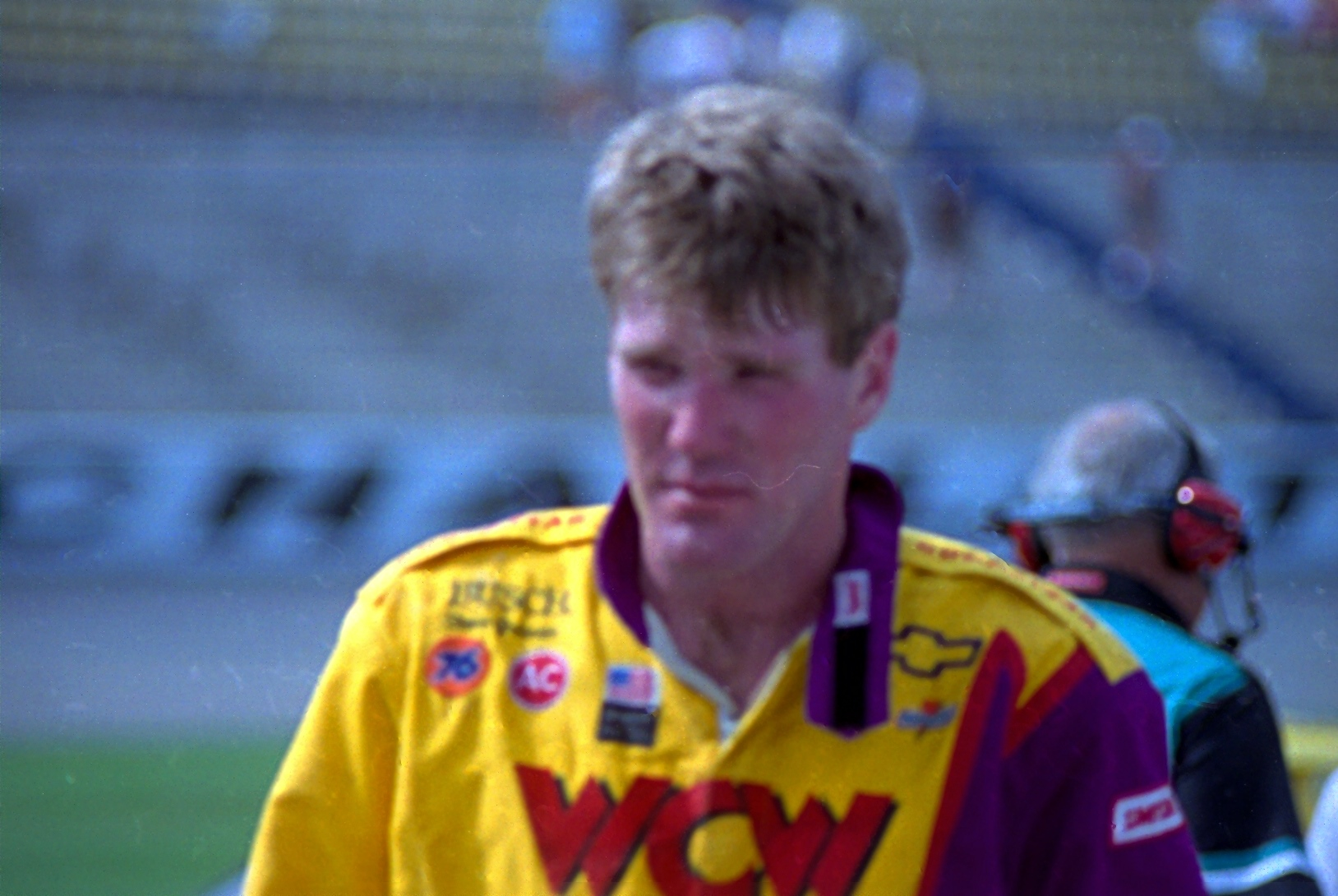
- Grissom in 1996
- Born: June 26, 1963 (age 63); Gadsden, Alabama, U.S.
- Achievements: 1985 All Pro Super Series Champion; 1993 NASCAR Busch Series champion

NASCAR Cup Series career
- 151 races run over 10 years
- Best finish: 21st (1997)
- First race: 1990 Atlanta Journal 500 (Atlanta)
- Last race: 2002 Old Dominion 500 (Martinsville)
Wins	Top tens	Poles
0	18	0

NASCAR O'Reilly Auto Parts Series career
- 309 races run over 24 years
- Best finish: 1st (1993)
- First race: 1986 Freedlander 200 (Richmond)
- Last race: 2009 Scotts Turf Builder 300 (Bristol)
- First win: 1990 Granger Select 200 (Dublin)
- Last win: 1996 Goody's Headache Powder 300 (Daytona)
Wins	Top tens	Poles
11	74	4

NASCAR FedEx Freight Truck Series career
- 24 races run over 1 year
- Best finish: 10th (2000)
- First race: 2000 Daytona 250 (Daytona)
- Last race: 2000 Motorola 200 (Fontana)
Wins	Top tens	Poles
0	11	0

Steven Paul Grissom (born June 26, 1963) is an American former professional stock car racing driver. He was the 1993 Busch Series champion and has eleven Busch wins in 185 starts. Grissom turned down a chance to play football at the University of Alabama to focus on a career in racing.

== Early years ==
Grissom began his racing career in his youth, working on cars with his father Wayne, who was a sponsor of short track drivers in their home state of Alabama. He soon began racing cars himself, balancing that with being captain of his high school football and basketball teams in 1981. He eventually joined the Winston All-Pro Series, and won the championship in 1985. The next season, he was nominated for Alabama Pro Athlete of the Year.

== NASCAR career ==
=== Busch Championship ===
Grissom made his Busch Series debut in 1986 at the Freedlander 200, in the No. 31 Oldsmobile owned by his father. He started 16th but finished 30th due to engine failure. He ran three more races over the next two years, his best finish being an 11th. In 1988, he moved into the series full-time. Despite a lack of major sponsorship, Grissom had four Top 10's and finished 13th in points. In 1989, he landed funding from Texas Pete Sauces, and moved to twelfth in points.

In 1990, Grissom won four races, including two straight, and finished 3rd in points behind Chuck Bown and Jimmy Hensley. During the season, Grissom ran one Winston Cup race for Dick Moroso at the Atlanta Journal 500, starting 23rd and finishing 24th. A lack of funding kept Grissom from competing for the championship in 1991, as he had one win and slid back to 10th in points. After Channellock and Roddenberry's came on board in 1992, Grissom regained his success of 1990, winning two races. He clinched the Busch Series championship in 1993 for his family-owned team. Grissom won the championship by 253 points over Ricky Craven.

=== Winston Cup ===
In 1993, Grissom ran an additional Cup race for Diamond Ridge Motorsports at Phoenix International Speedway, finishing 29th. Grissom signed with Diamond Ridge to compete for Rookie of the Year honors in 1994. Despite struggles in qualifying, Grissom had three Top 10's and was narrowly defeated by Jeff Burton for Rookie of the Year. Diamond Ridge also bought Grissom's Busch Series operation, and running a part-time schedule Grissom won twice and finished 26th in points in 1995. Grissom had four Top 10's in the 1995 Cup season, finishing 27th in points; he started the season running in the Top 10 points early on in the year. Grissom started 1996 off on a high note, winning the season-opening Busch Series race driving the WCW car, but he was released from Diamond Ridge after the Miller 400 race midway through the season.

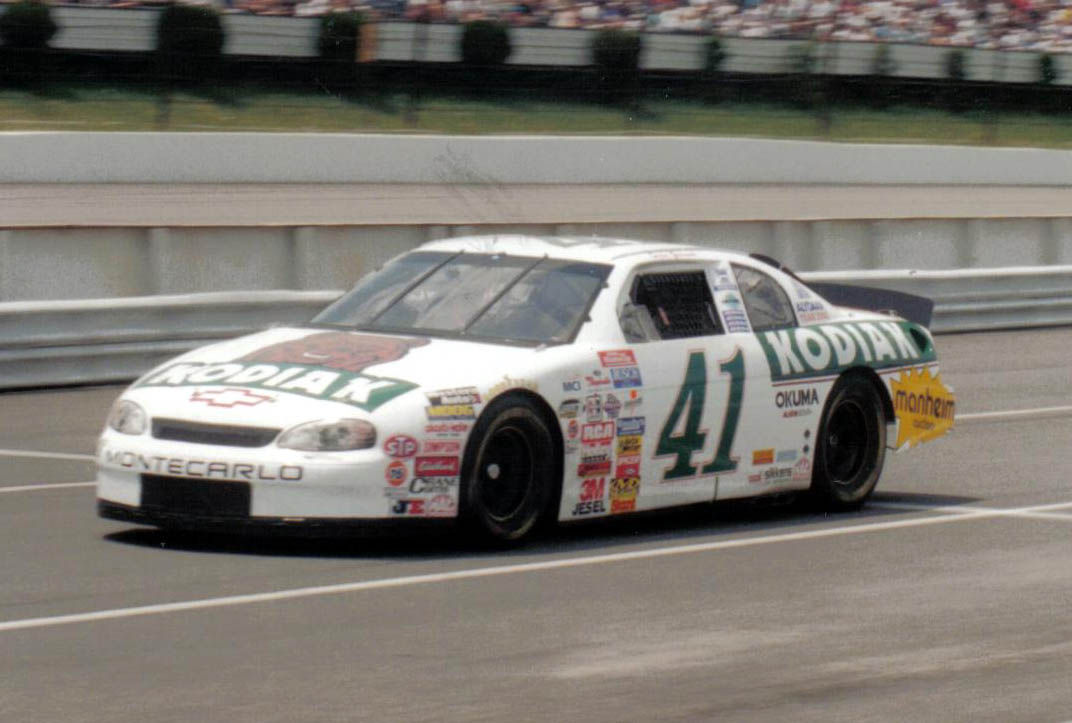
1997 racecar

For 1997, Grissom signed on with Larry Hedrick Motorsports. Grissom started the year winning the outside pole for the Daytona 500. As the season progressed, he finished in the Top 10 six times and finished a career-high 21st in points.

Grissom experienced a major crash during the Primestar 500 in 1997 when his No. 41 Chevrolet slid into the inside wall and flipped on the roof. The gas tank detached from the car and flew across the racetrack, spilling gasoline, which subsequently ignited a fire by friction with Mike Wallace's car. Grissom was taken to the infield medical center and released 45 minutes later, suffering only a sore ankle. The fire was extinguished and the racing resumed about an hour later with 44 laps remaining.

After he struggled throughout the 1998 season, he was released from his ride and ended the season driving the No. 96 for American Equipment Racing.

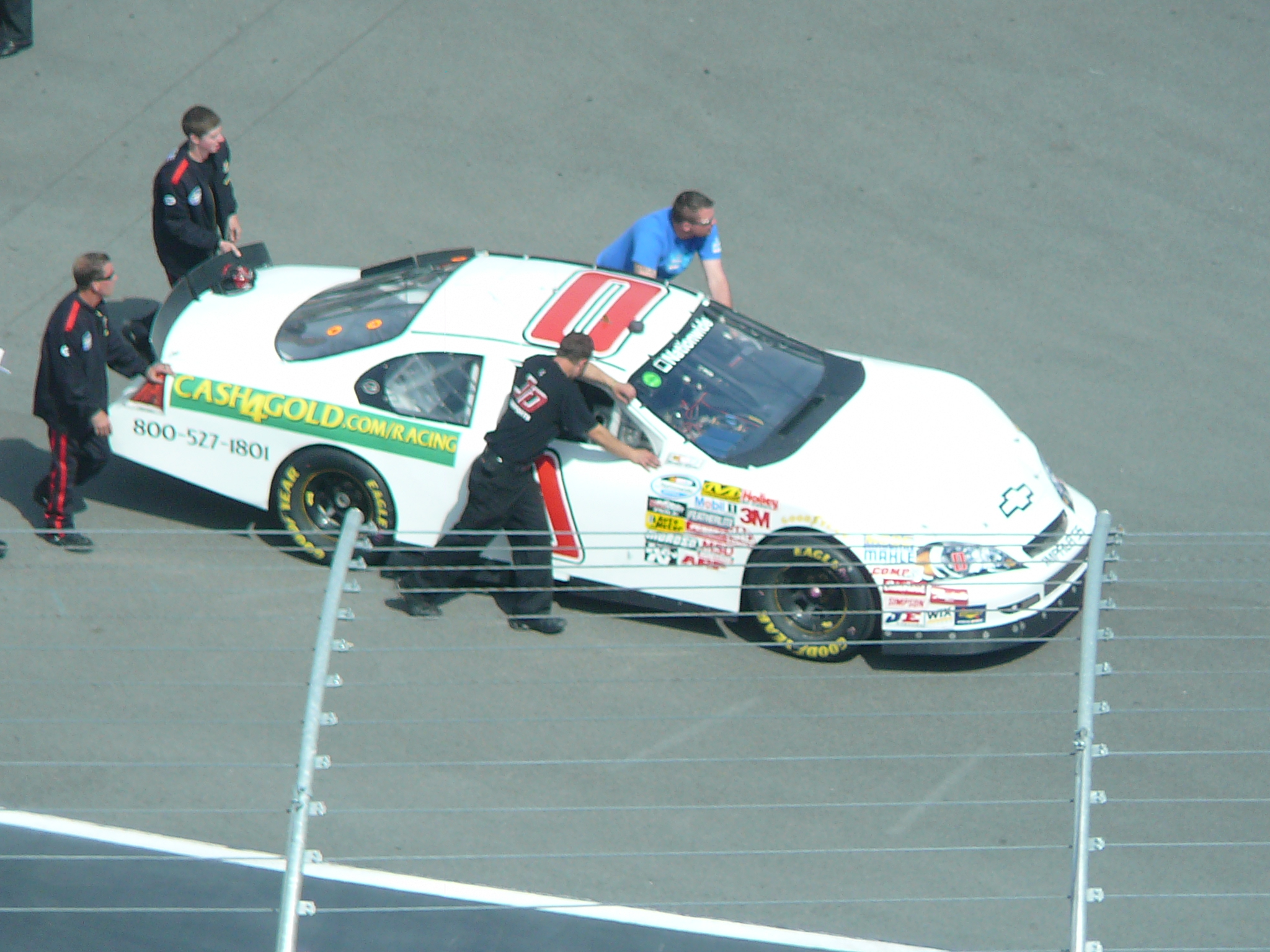
In 2009 Grissom drove this car for Johnny Davis's JD Motorsports. He started 43rd after crashing in qualifying and finished 43rd in the race after a vibration in car on lap 2.

After American Equipment closed its doors, Grissom started the 1999 season with LJ Racing in a four-race deal. After his contract was not renewed, he spent the season doing fill-in duty for Carroll Racing, Travis Carter Motorsports, and Hensley Motorsports, among others.

In 2000, Grissom was hired by Petty Enterprises to drive their No. 43 Dodge Ram in the Craftsman Truck Series. This year was best known as when Tony Roper turned into Grissom's bumper and hit the wall head-on at Texas Motor Speedway, then hitting Roper's truck as it slid down the track. Roper died of injuries he sustained from the crash the next morning. While he did not visit victory lane, Grissom finished in the Top 5 six times and finished 10th in points. He also ran in the Cup Series, filling in for Kyle Petty in the No. 44 Hot Wheels Pontiac Grand Prix. After spending virtually all of 2001 on the sidelines, he was called back to Petty in 2002 to replace Buckshot Jones in the No. 44. In ten starts, he posted one Top 10 at Richmond International Raceway. He has not run a Cup race since. That season, Grissom ran seven Nationwide Series races for Frank Cicci Racing, then spent 2003 at DCT Motorsports. After being released from DCT midway through 2004, he finished the year at GIC-Mixon Motorsports. He finished 28th in points that season.

== Personal life ==
Grissom's son Kyle Grissom is also a racing driver, having competed in the ARCA Racing Series.

Grissom's father and team owner, Wayne, died on August 21, 2021, at age 86.

== Motorsports career results ==
=== NASCAR ===
(key) (Bold – Pole position awarded by qualifying time. Italics – Pole position earned by points standings or practice time. * – Most laps led.)

==== Winston Cup Series ====
NASCAR Winston Cup Series results
Year	Team	No.	Make	1	2	3	4	5	6	7	8	9	10	11	12	13	14	15	16	17	18	19	20	21	22	23	24	25	26	27	28	29	30	31	32	33	34	35	36	NWCC	Pts	Ref
1990	Moroso Racing	20	Olds	DAY	RCH	CAR	ATL	DAR	BRI	NWS	MAR	TAL	CLT	DOV	SON	POC	MCHl	DAY	POC	TAL	GLN	MCH	BRI	DAR	RCH	DOV	MAR	NWS	CLT	CAR	PHO	ATL; 24								78th	91	
1993	Diamond Ridge Motorsports	29	Chevy	DAY	CAR	RCH	ATL	DAR	BRI	NWS	MAR	TAL	SON	CLT	DOV	POC	MCH	DAY	NHA	POC	TAL	GLN	MCH	BRI	DAR	RCH	DOV	MAR	NWS	CLT	CAR	PHO; 29	ATL							74th	76	
1994	Diamond Ridge Motorsports	29	Chevy	DAY; DNQ	CAR; 30	RCH; 23	ATL; 20	DAR; 14	BRI; 12	NWS; DNQ	MAR; 14	TAL; 10	SON; 35	CLT; 39	DOV; 27	POC; 26	MCH; 26	DAY; 33	NHA; 33	POC; 29	TAL; 18	IND; DNQ	GLN; 23	MCH; 19	BRI; 34	DAR; 23	RCH; 7	DOV; 8	MAR; 12	NWS; 20	CLT; 26	CAR; 30	PHO; 22	ATL; 26						28th	2660	
1995	Diamond Ridge Motorsports	29	Chevy	DAY; 7	CAR; 6	RCH; DNQ	ATL; 18	DAR; 6	BRI; 11	NWS; 5	MAR; 20	TAL; 37	SON; 26	CLT; 13	DOV; 16	POC; 18	MCH; 20	DAY; 43	NHA; 28	POC; 31	TAL; 25	IND; 30	GLN; 22	MCH; 29	BRI; 22	DAR; 27	RCH; DNQ	DOV; 25	MAR; 26	NWS; 31	CLT; 41	CAR; 14	PHO; 32	ATL; 39						27th	2757	
1996	Diamond Ridge Motorsports	29	Chevy	DAY; 27	CAR; 5	RCH; 21	ATL; 39	DAR; 26	BRI; 27	NWS; 26	MAR; DNQ	TAL; 6	SON; 25	CLT; 16	DOV; 42	POC; 22	MCH; 34	DAY	NHA	POC	TAL	IND	GLN	MCH	BRI	DAR	RCH	DOV	MAR	NWS	CLT	CAR	PHO	ATL						39th	1188	
1997	Larry Hedrick Motorsports	41	Chevy	DAY; 40	CAR; 24	RCH; 11	ATL; 33	DAR; DNQ	TEX; 10	BRI; 32	MAR; 20	SON; 17	TAL; 41	CLT; 11	DOV; 24	POC; 18	MCH; 38	CAL; 17	DAY; 38	NHA; 4	POC; 30	IND; 26	GLN; 9	MCH; 25	BRI; 5	DAR; 21	RCH; 12	NHA; 4	DOV; 21	MAR; 40	CLT; 13	TAL; 32	CAR; 24	PHO; 8	ATL; 28					21st	3061	
1998	Larry Hedrick Motorsports	41	Chevy	DAY; 28	CAR; 20	LVS; 39	ATL; 16	DAR; 19	BRI; 16	TEX; 10	MAR; 25	TAL; 16	CAL; 30	CLT; 32	DOV; 32	RCH; 39	MCH; 41	POC; 23	SON; 10	NHA; 43	POC; 39	IND; 23	GLN; 38	MCH; 33	BRI; DNQ	NHA; 25	DAR; 20	RCH; 17	DOV; DNQ	MAR										34th	2215	
1998	American Equipment Racing	96	Chevy																												CLT; 32	TAL; 36	DAY; 29	PHO	CAR; DNQ	ATL; DNQ				34th	2215	
1999	LJ Racing	91	Chevy	DAY; DNQ	CAR; 36	LVS; 42	ATL; DNQ	DAR	TEX	BRI	MAR	TAL	CAL	RCH	CLT	DOV	MCH	POC	SON	DAY	NHA	POC																		50th	336	
1999	Team SABCO	01	Chevy																				IND; DNQ	GLN	MCH								TAL; 28	CAR	PHO	HOM	ATL			50th	336	
1999	Melling Racing	9	Ford																							BRI; 39	DAR; 39	RCH; 30	NHA	DOV	MAR	CLT								50th	336	
2000	Petty Enterprises	44	Pontiac	DAY	CAR	LVS	ATL	DAR	BRI	TEX	MAR	TAL	CAL	RCH	CLT; DNQ	DOV	MCH	POC	SON	DAY	NHA; 36	POC	IND; DNQ	GLN	MCH	BRI	DAR; 26	RCH; 27	NHA; DNQ	DOV; 27	MAR; DNQ	CLT; DNQ	TAL; 16	CAR; DNQ	PHO; DNQ	HOM; DNQ	ATL; DNQ			52nd	419	
2002	Petty Enterprises	44	Dodge	DAY	CAR	LVS	ATL	DAR	BRI	TEX	MAR	TAL; 25	CAL; 33	RCH; 8	CLT; 32	DOV; 25	POC; 26	MCH; 40	SON	DAY; DNQ	CHI; 31	NHA; 28	POC	IND	GLN	MCH	BRI	DAR	RCH	NHA	DOV	KAN	TAL	CLT	MAR; 40	ATL	CAR	PHO	HOM	44th	769	

===== Daytona 500 =====
Year	Team	Manufacturer	Start	Finish
1994	Diamond Ridge Motorsports	Chevrolet	DNQ	
1995	Diamond Ridge Motorsports	Chevrolet	35	7
1996	Diamond Ridge Motorsports	Chevrolet	26	27
1997	Larry Hedrick Motorsports	Chevrolet	2	40
1998	Larry Hedrick Motorsports	Chevrolet	41	28
1999	LJ Racing	Chevrolet	DNQ	

==== Nationwide Series ====
NASCAR Nationwide Series results
Year	Team	No.	Make	1	2	3	4	5	6	7	8	9	10	11	12	13	14	15	16	17	18	19	20	21	22	23	24	25	26	27	28	29	30	31	32	33	34	35	NNSC	Pts	Ref
1986	Grissom Racing Enterprises	31	Olds	DAY	CAR	HCY	MAR	BRI	DAR	SBO	LGY	JFC	DOV	CLT	SBO	HCY	ROU	IRP	SBO	RAL	OXF	SBO	HCY	LGY	ROU	BRI	DAR	RCH; 30	DOV	MAR; 28	ROU	CLT	CAR	MAR					110th	0	
1987	Grissom Racing Enterprises	39	Chevy	DAY	HCY	MAR	DAR	BRI	LGY	SBO	CLT	DOV	IRP	ROU	JFC; 11	OXF	SBO	HCY	RAL; 32	LGY	ROU	BRI	JFC	DAR	RCH	DOV	MAR												49th	197	
1987	Grissom Racing Enterprises	39	Olds																									CLT; DNQ	CAR	MAR									49th	197	
1988	Grissom Racing Enterprises	39	Ford	DAY; 15	HCY	CAR; 15	MAR; 18	DAR; 17	BRI; 16	LNG; 17	NZH; 9	SBO; 19	NSV; 22	CLT; 42	DOV; 8	ROU; 18	LAN; 14	LVL; 8	MYB; 24	OXF; 46																			13th	2969	
1988	Grissom Racing Enterprises	39	Chevy																		SBO; 22	HCY; 17																	13th	2969	
1988	Grissom Racing Enterprises	39	Olds																				LNG; 20	IRP; 24	ROU; 23	BRI; 19	DAR; 36	RCH; 5	DOV; 25	MAR; 31	CLT; 17	CAR; 26	MAR; 18						13th	2969	
1989	Falcon Racing	9	Pontiac	DAY; 17	CAR; 38	MAR; 11	HCY; 11	DAR; 27	BRI; 4	NZH; 39	SBO; 25	LAN; 22	NSV; 20	CLT; 16		ROU; 18	LVL; 10	VOL; 18	MYB; 15	SBO; 14	HCY; 16	DUB; 3	IRP; 6	ROU; 12	BRI; 21	DAR; 26		DOV; 21	MAR; 20	CLT; 9	CAR; 29	MAR; 21							12th	3108	
1989	Falcon Racing	19	Pontiac												DOV; 38												RCH; 22												12th	3108	
1990	Grissom Racing Enterprises	31	Olds	DAY; 33	RCH; DNQ	CAR; 15	MAR; 24	HCY; 8	DAR; 20	BRI; 16	LAN; 5	SBO; 3	NZH; 5*	HCY; 7	CLT; 27	DOV; 21	ROU; 22	VOL; 4	MYB; 11	OXF; 8	NHA; 23	SBO; 5	**DUB**; 1*	IRP; 1*	ROU; 17	BRI; 3	DAR; 16	RCH; 2*	DOV; 7	MAR; 21	CLT; 32	NHA; 26	CAR; 1	MAR; 1					3rd	3982	
1990	Ling Racing	66	Olds		RCH; 25																																		3rd	3982	
1991	Grissom Racing Enterprises	31	Olds	DAY; 25	RCH; 21	CAR; 33	MAR; 6	VOL; 9	HCY; 18	DAR; 37	BRI; DNQ	LAN; 26	**SBO**; 5	NZH; 2	CLT; 20	DOV; 8	ROU; 12	HCY; 5	MYB; 3	GLN; 9	OXF; 9	NHA; 3	SBO; 1	DUB; 6	IRP; 19	ROU; 4	BRI; 24	DAR; 16	RCH; 25	DOV; 23	CLT; 29	NHA; 25	CAR; 16	MAR; 20					10th	3689	
1991	Teague-Weiss Racing	38	Olds								BRI; 28																												10th	3689	
1992	Grissom Racing Enterprises	31	Olds	DAY; 10	CAR; 7	RCH; 13	ATL; 17	MAR; 21	DAR; 6	BRI; 21	**HCY**; 6*	LAN; 15	DUB; 4	NZH; 22	CLT; 29	DOV; 12	ROU; 20	MYB; 11	GLN; 11	VOL; 1	NHA; 43	TAL; 16	IRP; 21	ROU; 13	MCH; 18	NHA; 25	BRI; 11	DAR; 19	RCH; 31	DOV; 14	CLT; 33	MAR; 11	CAR; 28	HCY; 9					12th	3545	
1993	Grissom Racing Enterprises	31	Olds	DAY; 11																																			1st	3846	
1993	Grissom Racing Enterprises	31	Chevy		CAR; 4	RCH; 17	DAR; 14	BRI; 3	HCY; 1	ROU; 3	MAR; 8	NZH; 2	CLT; 26	DOV; 17	MYB; 5	GLN; 13	MLW; 1	TAL; 25	IRP; 20	MCH; 4	NHA; 4	BRI; 7	DAR; 5	RCH; 10	DOV; 7	ROU; 27	CLT; 28	MAR; 2	CAR; 7	HCY; 9	ATL; 9								1st	3846	
1994	Grissom Racing Enterprises	31	Chevy	DAY	CAR	RCH	ATL	MAR	DAR	HCY	BRI	ROU	NHA	NZH	CLT; 32	DOV; 35	MYB	GLN; 18	MLW	SBO	TAL; 22	HCY; 29	IRP	MCH; 19	BRI	DAR; 32	RCH; 5	DOV; 39	CLT; 31	MAR	CAR; 31								43rd	921	
1995	Diamond Ridge Motorsports	29	Chevy	DAY; 19	CAR	RCH	ATL	NSV	DAR; 6*	BRI; 1	HCY	NHA	NZH	CLT; 13	DOV; 30	MYB	GLN; 6	MLW	TAL; 29	SBO	IRP	MCH; 39	BRI; 1	DAR; 11	RCH; 4	DOV; 4	CLT; 27	CAR; 6	HOM; 38										26th	1816	
1996	Diamond Ridge Motorsports	29	Chevy	DAY; 1*	CAR; 24	RCH; 16	ATL; 4	NSV	DAR; 7	BRI; 5	HCY	NZH	CLT; 21	DOV; 35	SBO	MYB	GLN	MLW	NHA	TAL	IRP	MCH	BRI	DAR	RCH	DOV	CLT	CAR	HOM										45th	1005	
1997	Labonte Motorsports	5	Chevy	DAY	CAR	RCH	ATL	LVS	DAR	HCY	TEX	BRI	NSV	TAL	NHA	NZH	CLT	DOV	SBO	GLN	MLW	MYB	GTY	IRP	MCH	BRI	DAR	RCH; 39	DOV	CLT	CAL	CAR	HOM						114th	46	
1998	Spencer Motor Ventures	12	Chevy	DAY	CAR	LVS	NSV	DAR	BRI	TEX	HCY	TAL	NHA	NZH	CLT	DOV	RCH	PPR	GLN	MLW	MYB	CAL	SBO	IRP	MCH	**BRI**; 27	DAR	RCH; QL^{†}	DOV										77th	193	
1998	ST Motorsports	59	Chevy																											CLT; 19	GTY	CAR	ATL	HOM					77th	193	
1999	Joe Gibbs Racing	18	Pontiac	DAY	CAR	LVS	ATL	DAR	TEX; DNQ																														52nd	855	
1999	BACE Motorsports	74	Chevy						TEX; 40	NSV																													52nd	855	
1999	Spencer Motor Ventures	12	Chevy								BRI; 22	TAL	CAL																										52nd	855	
1999	AllCar Motorsports	22	Chevy											NHA; 14	RCH; 36	NZH	CLT; DNQ	DOV; 39	SBO	GLN	MLW	MYB				MCH; 30	BRI; DNQ	DAR	RCH	DOV									52nd	855	
1999	Labonte Motorsports	44	Chevy																				PPR; 30	GTY	IRP														52nd	855	
1999	HVP Motorsports	63	Chevy																												CLT; 35								52nd	855	
1999	Jarrett/Favre Motorsports	11	Ford																													CAR; 27	MEM; 13	PHO; 36	HOM; 41				52nd	855	
2000	Petty Enterprises	8	Chevy	DAY	CAR	LVS	ATL	DAR	BRI	TEX	NSV	TAL	CAL	RCH	NHA	CLT	DOV	SBO	MYB	GLN	MLW	NZH	PPR	GTY	IRP	MCH	BRI	DAR	RCH	DOV	CLT	CAR; 37	MEM	PHO	HOM				109th	52	
2001	Petty Enterprises	45	Chevy	DAY; 26	CAR	LVS	ATL	DAR	BRI	TEX	NSH	TAL	CAL	RCH	NHA	NZH	CLT	DOV	KEN	MLW	GLN	CHI	GTY	PPR	IRP	MCH	BRI	DAR	RCH	DOV	KAN	CLT	MEM	PHO	CAR	HOM			151st	0	
2002	Frank Cicci Racing	34	Chevy	DAY	CAR	LVS	DAR	BRI	TEX	NSH	TAL	CAL	RCH	NHA	NZH	CLT	DOV	NSH	KEN	MLW	DAY	CHI	GTY	PPR	IRP	MCH; 30	BRI; 41	DAR	RCH; 22	DOV; 29	KAN; 37	CLT; 23	MEM	ATL	CAR	PHO	HOM; 31		56th	502	
2003	DLP Racing	07	Chevy	DAY	CAR	LVS	DAR	BRI	TEX	TAL	NSH; 40	CAL	RCH	GTY	NZH	CLT	DOV	NSH	KEN	MLW																			67th	482	
2003	DCT Motorsports	61	Pontiac																		DAY; 29	CHI	NHA	PPR	IRP	MCH	BRI; 26	DAR											67th	482	
2003	DCT Motorsports	61	Chevy																										RCH; 14	DOV	KAN								67th	482	
2003	DCT Motorsports	36	Chevy																													CLT; 28	MEM	ATL	PHO	CAR	HOM; 30		67th	482	
2004	DCT Motorsports	36	Chevy	DAY; 25	CAR; 11	LVS; 32	DAR; 24	BRI; 15	TEX	NSH	TAL; 18	CAL	GTY	RCH	NZH; 20	CLT; 38	DOV	NSH																					28th	2011	
2004	GIC-Mixon Motorsports	24	Chevy																KEN; 20	MLW; 24	DAY	CHI; 28	NHA; 23	PPR; 30	IRP; 28	MCH; 43	BRI; 25	CAL; 43	RCH; 26	DOV; 33	KAN; 36	CLT; 37	MEM; 41	ATL; 39		DAR; 24	HOM; 36		28th	2011	
2004	GIC-Mixon Motorsports	93	Chevy																																PHO; 25				28th	2011	
2005	Jay Robinson Racing	49	Ford	DAY; 28	CAL; 37	MXC	LVS; 41	ATL; 40	NSH; 24	BRI; 24	TEX; 29	PHO; 27	TAL; 16	DAR; 36	RCH; 32	CLT; 40	DOV; 30	NSH; 39	KEN; 27	MLW; 38	DAY; 23	CHI; 43	NHA; 30	PPR; 33	GTY; 34	IRP; 27	GLN; 30	MCH; 35	BRI; 36	CAL; 40	RCH; 25	DOV; 28	KAN; 32	CLT; DNQ	MEM; 37	TEX; DNQ	PHO; 38	HOM; DNQ	23rd	2071	
2006	Jay Robinson Racing	49	Ford	DAY; 21	CAL	MXC	LVS	ATL	BRI	TEX	NSH	PHO	TAL	RCH	DAR	CLT	DOV	NSH	KEN	MLW	DAY	CHI	NHA	MAR	GTY	IRP	GLN	MCH	BRI; 40	CAL	RCH	DOV	KAN	CLT	MEM	TEX	PHO	HOM	98th	148	
2007	Frank Cicci Racing	34	Chevy	DAY; 25	CAL	MXC	LVS	ATL	BRI	NSH	TEX	PHO	TAL	RCH	DAR	CLT	DOV	NSH	KEN	MLW	NHA	DAY	CHI	GTY	IRP	CGV	GLN	MCH	BRI	CAL	RCH	DOV	KAN	CLT	MEM	TEX	PHO	HOM	133rd	88	
2008	MSRP Motorsports	90	Chevy	DAY; 43	CAL	LVS	ATL	BRI	NSH	TEX	PHO	MXC	TAL	RCH	DAR	CLT	DOV	NSH	KEN	MLW	NHA	DAY	CHI	GTY	IRP	CGV	GLN	MCH	BRI	CAL	RCH	DOV	KAN	CLT	MEM	TEX	PHO	HOM	148th	34	
2009	JD Motorsports	0	Chevy	DAY	CAL	LVS	BRI; 43	TEX	NSH	PHO	TAL	RCH	DAR	CLT	DOV	NSH	KEN	MLW	NHA	DAY	CHI	GTY	IRP	IOW	GLN	MCH	BRI	CGV	ATL	RCH	DOV	KAN	CAL	CLT	MEM	TEX	PHO	HOM	149th	34	
^{†} – Qualified for Jimmy Spencer.

==== Craftsman Truck Series ====
NASCAR Craftsman Truck Series results
Year	Team	No.	Make	1	2	3	4	5	6	7	8	9	10	11	12	13	14	15	16	17	18	19	20	21	22	23	24	25	NCTC	Pts	Ref
2000	Petty Enterprises	43	Dodge	DAY; 10	HOM; 11	PHO; 7	MMR; 4	MAR; 5	PIR; 8	GTY; 6	MEM; 5	PPR; 21	EVG; 26	TEX; 15	KEN; 18	GLN; 12	MLW; 4	NHA; 14	NZH; 4	MCH; 16	IRP; 11	NSV; 5	CIC; 24	RCH; 9	DOV; 13	TEX; 28	CAL; 18		10th	3113	
2005	Brevak Racing	31	Dodge	DAY	CAL	ATL; DNQ	MAR	GTY	MFD	CLT	DOV	TEX	MCH	MLW	KAN	KEN	MEM	IRP	NSH	BRI	RCH	NHA	LVS	MAR	ATL	TEX	PHO	HOM	N/A	-	

Sporting positions
Preceded by Joe Nemechek	NASCAR Busch Series Champion; 1993	Succeeded by David Green
