= 1994 DieHard 500 =

18th race of the 1994 NASCAR Winston Cup Series

Race details
- Race 18 of 31 in the 1994 NASCAR Winston Cup Series
- The 1994 DieHard 500 program cover
- Date: July 24, 1994
- Official name: 26th Annual DieHard 500
- Location: Lincoln, Alabama, Talladega Superspeedway
- Course: Permanent racing facility
- Course length: 2.66 miles (4.28 km)
- Distance: 188 laps, 500.08 mi (804.8 km)
- Scheduled distance: 188 laps, 500.08 mi (804.8 km)
- Average speed: 163.217 miles per hour (262.672 km/h)

Pole position
Driver	Dale Earnhardt	Richard Childress Racing
- Time: 49.496

Most laps led
Driver	Ernie Irvan	Robert Yates Racing
- Laps: 90

Winner
No. 27	Jimmy Spencer	Junior Johnson & Associates

Television in the United States
- Network: CBS
- Announcers: Ken Squier, Ned Jarrett, Richard Petty

Radio in the United States
- Radio: Motor Racing Network

The 1994 DieHard 500 was the 18th stock car race of the 1994 NASCAR Winston Cup Series season and the 26th iteration of the event. The race was held on Sunday, July 24, 1994, in Lincoln, Alabama, at Talladega Superspeedway, a 2.66-mile (4.28 km) permanent triangle-shaped superspeedway. The race took the scheduled 188 laps to complete. In the final nineteen laps of the race, Junior Johnson & Associates driver Jimmy Spencer would manage to hold off the field to take his second and final career NASCAR Winston Cup Series victory and his second and final victory of the season. To fill out the top three, teammate Bill Elliott and Robert Yates Racing driver Ernie Irvan would finish second and third, respectively. With his third place finish, Irvan would regain the points lead in the overall driver's standings.

== Background ==
The layout of Talladega Superspeedway, the venue where the race was held.

Talladega Superspeedway, originally known as Alabama International Motor Superspeedway (AIMS), is a motorsports complex located north of Talladega, Alabama. It is located on the former Anniston Air Force Base in the small city of Lincoln. The track is a tri-oval and was constructed in the 1960s by the International Speedway Corporation, a business controlled by the France family. Talladega is most known for its steep banking and the unique location of the start/finish line that's located just past the exit to pit road. The track currently hosts the NASCAR series such as the NASCAR Cup Series, O'Reilly Auto Parts Series and the Truck Series. Talladega is the longest NASCAR oval, a 2.66-mile-long (4.28 km) tri-oval like the Daytona International Speedway, which also is a 2.5-mile-long (4.0 km) tri-oval.

=== Entry list ===
- (R) denotes rookie driver.

#	Driver	Team	Make
0	Delma Cowart	H. L. Waters Racing	Ford
1	Rick Mast	Precision Products Racing	Ford
2	Rusty Wallace	Penske Racing South	Ford
02	Derrike Cope	Taylor Racing	Ford
3	Dale Earnhardt	Richard Childress Racing	Chevrolet
4	Sterling Marlin	Morgan–McClure Motorsports	Chevrolet
5	Terry Labonte	Hendrick Motorsports	Chevrolet
6	Mark Martin	Roush Racing	Ford
7	Geoff Bodine	Geoff Bodine Racing	Ford
8	Jeff Burton (R)	Stavola Brothers Racing	Ford
10	Ricky Rudd	Rudd Performance Motorsports	Ford
11	Bill Elliott	Junior Johnson & Associates	Ford
12	Tim Steele	Bobby Allison Motorsports	Ford
14	John Andretti (R)	Hagan Racing	Chevrolet
15	Lake Speed	Bud Moore Engineering	Ford
16	Ted Musgrave	Roush Racing	Ford
17	Darrell Waltrip	Darrell Waltrip Motorsports	Chevrolet
18	Dale Jarrett	Joe Gibbs Racing	Chevrolet
19	Loy Allen Jr. (R)	TriStar Motorsports	Ford
20	Bobby Hillin Jr.	Moroso Racing	Ford
21	Morgan Shepherd	Wood Brothers Racing	Ford
22	Bobby Labonte	Bill Davis Racing	Pontiac
23	Hut Stricklin	Travis Carter Enterprises	Ford
24	Jeff Gordon	Hendrick Motorsports	Chevrolet
25	Ken Schrader	Hendrick Motorsports	Chevrolet
26	Brett Bodine	King Racing	Ford
27	Jimmy Spencer	Junior Johnson & Associates	Ford
28	Ernie Irvan	Robert Yates Racing	Ford
29	Steve Grissom	Diamond Ridge Motorsports	Chevrolet
30	Michael Waltrip	Bahari Racing	Pontiac
31	Ward Burton	A.G. Dillard Motorsports	Chevrolet
32	Dick Trickle	Active Motorsports	Chevrolet
33	Harry Gant	Leo Jackson Motorsports	Chevrolet
40	Bobby Hamilton	SABCO Racing	Pontiac
41	Joe Nemechek (R)	Larry Hedrick Motorsports	Chevrolet
42	Kyle Petty	SABCO Racing	Pontiac
43	Wally Dallenbach Jr.	Petty Enterprises	Pontiac
44	Kenny Wallace	Charles Hardy Racing	Ford
45	Rich Bickle (R)	Terminal Trucking Motorsports	Ford
47	Billy Standridge (R)	Johnson Standridge Racing	Ford
51	Jeff Purvis	Phoenix Racing	Chevrolet
52	Brad Teague	Jimmy Means Racing	Ford
53	Ritchie Petty	Petty Brothers Racing	Ford
55	Jimmy Hensley	RaDiUs Motorsports	Ford
71	Dave Marcis	Marcis Auto Racing	Chevrolet
75	Todd Bodine	Butch Mock Motorsports	Ford
77	Greg Sacks	U.S. Motorsports Inc.	Ford
80	Joe Ruttman	Hover Motorsports	Ford
89	Ronnie Sanders	Mueller Racing	Ford
90	Mike Wallace (R)	Donlavey Racing	Ford
95	Ben Hess	Sadler Brothers Racing	Ford
98	Jeremy Mayfield (R)	Cale Yarborough Motorsports	Ford

== Qualifying ==
Qualifying was split into two rounds. The first round was held on Friday, July 22, at 4:00 PM EST. Each driver would have one lap to set a time. During the first round, the top 20 drivers in the round would be guaranteed a starting spot in the race. If a driver was not able to guarantee a spot in the first round, they had the option to scrub their time from the first round and try and run a faster lap time in a second round qualifying run, held on Saturday, July 23, at 11:45 AM EST. As with the first round, each driver would have one lap to set a time. For this specific race, positions 21-40 would be decided on time, and depending on who needed it, a select amount of positions were given to cars who had not otherwise qualified but were high enough in owner's points; up to two provisionals were given. If needed, a past champion who did not qualify on either time or provisionals could use a champion's provisional, adding one more spot to the field.

Dale Earnhardt, driving for Richard Childress Racing, won the pole, setting a time of 49.496 and an average speed of 193.470 mph (311.360 km/h) in the first round.

Ten drivers would fail to qualify.

=== Full qualifying results ===
Pos.	#	Driver	Team	Make	Time	Speed
1	3	Dale Earnhardt	Richard Childress Racing	Chevrolet	49.496	193.470
2	27	Jimmy Spencer	Junior Johnson & Associates	Ford	49.615	193.006
3	19	Loy Allen Jr. (R)	TriStar Motorsports	Ford	49.677	192.765
4	25	Ken Schrader	Hendrick Motorsports	Chevrolet	49.779	192.370
5	28	Ernie Irvan	Robert Yates Racing	Ford	49.790	192.328
6	6	Mark Martin	Roush Racing	Ford	49.923	191.815
7	75	Todd Bodine	Butch Mock Motorsports	Ford	49.999	191.524
8	4	Sterling Marlin	Morgan–McClure Motorsports	Chevrolet	50.013	191.470
9	30	Michael Waltrip	Bahari Racing	Pontiac	50.039	191.371
10	43	Wally Dallenbach Jr.	Petty Enterprises	Pontiac	50.071	191.248
11	11	Bill Elliott	Junior Johnson & Associates	Ford	50.130	191.023
12	5	Terry Labonte	Hendrick Motorsports	Chevrolet	50.177	190.844
13	18	Dale Jarrett	Joe Gibbs Racing	Chevrolet	50.179	190.837
14	90	Mike Wallace (R)	Donlavey Racing	Ford	50.184	190.818
15	24	Jeff Gordon	Hendrick Motorsports	Chevrolet	50.187	190.806
16	44	Kenny Wallace	Charles Hardy Racing	Ford	50.203	190.746
17	16	Ted Musgrave	Roush Racing	Ford	50.221	190.677
18	15	Lake Speed	Bud Moore Engineering	Ford	50.250	190.567
19	26	Brett Bodine	King Racing	Ford	50.297	190.389
20	7	Geoff Bodine	Geoff Bodine Racing	Ford	50.314	190.325
Failed to lock in Round 1
21	14	John Andretti (R)	Hagan Racing	Chevrolet	50.205	190.738
22	17	Darrell Waltrip	Darrell Waltrip Motorsports	Chevrolet	50.313	190.329
23	42	Kyle Petty	SABCO Racing	Pontiac	50.371	190.109
24	29	Steve Grissom (R)	Diamond Ridge Motorsports	Chevrolet	50.402	189.992
25	98	Jeremy Mayfield (R)	Cale Yarborough Motorsports	Ford	50.461	189.770
26	2	Rusty Wallace	Penske Racing South	Ford	50.481	189.695
27	12	Tim Steele	Bobby Allison Motorsports	Ford	50.492	189.654
28	10	Ricky Rudd	Rudd Performance Motorsports	Ford	50.493	189.650
29	77	Greg Sacks	U.S. Motorsports Inc.	Ford	50.494	189.646
30	51	Jeff Purvis	Phoenix Racing	Chevrolet	50.516	189.564
31	21	Morgan Shepherd	Wood Brothers Racing	Ford	50.560	189.399
32	20	Bobby Hillin Jr.	Moroso Racing	Ford	50.576	189.339
33	33	Harry Gant	Leo Jackson Motorsports	Chevrolet	50.609	189.215
34	71	Dave Marcis	Marcis Auto Racing	Chevrolet	50.610	189.212
35	22	Bobby Labonte	Bill Davis Racing	Pontiac	50.628	189.144
36	55	Jimmy Hensley	RaDiUs Motorsports	Ford	50.632	189.129
37	23	Hut Stricklin	Travis Carter Enterprises	Ford	50.638	189.107
38	1	Rick Mast	Precision Products Racing	Ford	50.673	188.976
39	8	Jeff Burton (R)	Stavola Brothers Racing	Ford	50.680	188.950
40	52	Brad Teague	Jimmy Means Racing	Ford	50.684	188.935
Provisionals
41	40	Bobby Hamilton	SABCO Racing	Pontiac	50.885	188.189
42	41	Joe Nemechek (R)	Larry Hedrick Motorsports	Chevrolet	50.731	188.760
Failed to qualify
43	45	Rich Bickle (R)	Terminal Trucking Motorsports	Ford	50.726	188.779
44	32	Dick Trickle	Active Motorsports	Chevrolet	50.802	188.497
45	53	Ritchie Petty	Petty Brothers Racing	Ford	50.842	188.348
46	02	Derrike Cope	Taylor Racing	Ford	50.919	188.063
47	31	Ward Burton (R)	A.G. Dillard Motorsports	Chevrolet	51.057	187.555
48	95	Ben Hess	Sadler Brothers Racing	Ford	51.171	187.137
49	47	Billy Standridge (R)	Johnson Standridge Racing	Ford	51.496	185.956
50	80	Joe Ruttman	Hover Motorsports	Ford	51.570	185.689
51	0	Delma Cowart	H. L. Waters Racing	Ford	52.715	181.656
52	89	Ronnie Sanders	Mueller Racing	Ford	-	-
Official first round qualifying results
Official starting lineup

== Race results ==
Fin	St	#	Driver	Team	Make	Laps	Led	Status	Pts	Winnings
1	2	27	Jimmy Spencer	Junior Johnson & Associates	Ford	188	21	running	180	$81,450
2	11	11	Bill Elliott	Junior Johnson & Associates	Ford	188	14	running	175	$52,445
3	5	28	Ernie Irvan	Robert Yates Racing	Ford	188	90	running	175	$47,130
4	4	25	Ken Schrader	Hendrick Motorsports	Chevrolet	188	8	running	165	$33,530
5	8	4	Sterling Marlin	Morgan–McClure Motorsports	Chevrolet	188	7	running	160	$32,675
6	6	6	Mark Martin	Roush Racing	Ford	188	0	running	150	$29,550
7	28	10	Ricky Rudd	Rudd Performance Motorsports	Ford	188	1	running	151	$19,350
8	10	43	Wally Dallenbach Jr.	Petty Enterprises	Pontiac	188	0	running	142	$17,700
9	16	44	Kenny Wallace	Charles Hardy Racing	Ford	188	0	running	138	$13,370
10	12	5	Terry Labonte	Hendrick Motorsports	Chevrolet	188	0	running	134	$25,250
11	9	30	Michael Waltrip	Bahari Racing	Pontiac	188	0	running	130	$19,830
12	35	22	Bobby Labonte	Bill Davis Racing	Pontiac	188	0	running	127	$21,450
13	14	90	Mike Wallace (R)	Donlavey Racing	Ford	188	0	running	124	$16,130
14	18	15	Lake Speed	Bud Moore Engineering	Ford	188	1	running	126	$21,960
15	31	21	Morgan Shepherd	Wood Brothers Racing	Ford	188	1	running	123	$22,135
16	7	75	Todd Bodine	Butch Mock Motorsports	Ford	188	0	running	115	$14,450
17	19	26	Brett Bodine	King Racing	Ford	187	0	running	112	$18,185
18	24	29	Steve Grissom (R)	Diamond Ridge Motorsports	Chevrolet	187	0	running	109	$14,480
19	23	42	Kyle Petty	SABCO Racing	Pontiac	187	0	running	106	$22,200
20	38	1	Rick Mast	Precision Products Racing	Ford	186	0	running	103	$18,110
21	33	33	Harry Gant	Leo Jackson Motorsports	Chevrolet	186	0	running	100	$17,180
22	41	40	Bobby Hamilton	SABCO Racing	Pontiac	186	0	running	97	$16,950
23	32	20	Bobby Hillin Jr.	Moroso Racing	Ford	185	0	running	94	$10,470
24	22	17	Darrell Waltrip	Darrell Waltrip Motorsports	Chevrolet	185	0	running	91	$16,640
25	37	23	Hut Stricklin	Travis Carter Enterprises	Ford	184	0	running	88	$12,210
26	39	8	Jeff Burton (R)	Stavola Brothers Racing	Ford	184	0	running	85	$16,035
27	34	71	Dave Marcis	Marcis Auto Racing	Chevrolet	184	0	running	82	$12,040
28	40	52	Brad Teague	Jimmy Means Racing	Ford	184	0	running	79	$9,985
29	29	77	Greg Sacks	U.S. Motorsports Inc.	Ford	174	0	crash	76	$11,325
30	36	55	Jimmy Hensley	RaDiUs Motorsports	Ford	165	0	crash	73	$9,780
31	15	24	Jeff Gordon	Hendrick Motorsports	Chevrolet	149	0	engine	70	$19,660
32	25	98	Jeremy Mayfield (R)	Cale Yarborough Motorsports	Ford	140	0	wheel bearing	67	$9,590
33	20	7	Geoff Bodine	Geoff Bodine Racing	Ford	136	0	engine	64	$13,520
34	1	3	Dale Earnhardt	Richard Childress Racing	Chevrolet	80	41	engine	66	$30,725
35	42	41	Joe Nemechek (R)	Larry Hedrick Motorsports	Chevrolet	75	0	ignition	58	$9,430
36	30	51	Jeff Purvis	Phoenix Racing	Chevrolet	71	0	engine	55	$9,395
37	3	19	Loy Allen Jr. (R)	TriStar Motorsports	Ford	66	4	engine	57	$9,781
38	27	12	Tim Steele	Bobby Allison Motorsports	Ford	54	0	quit	49	$13,345
39	13	18	Dale Jarrett	Joe Gibbs Racing	Chevrolet	34	0	piston	46	$20,690
40	21	14	John Andretti (R)	Hagan Racing	Chevrolet	28	0	crash	43	$14,525
41	17	16	Ted Musgrave	Roush Racing	Ford	24	0	crash	40	$13,228
42	26	2	Rusty Wallace	Penske Racing South	Ford	8	0	piston	37	$21,425
Official race results

== Media ==
=== Television ===
The Diehard 500 was covered by CBS in the United States. Ken Squier, two-time NASCAR Cup Series champion Ned Jarrett and 1974 race winner Richard Petty called the race from the broadcast booth. Mike Joy, David Hobbs and Dick Berggren handled pit road for the television side.

CBS
Booth announcers		Pit reporters
Lap-by-lap	Color-commentators	Pit reporters
Ken Squier	Ned Jarrett; Richard Petty	Mike Joy; David Hobbs; Dick Berggren

== Standings after the race ==
Drivers' Championship standings

	Pos	Driver	Points
1	1	Ernie Irvan	2,739
1	2	Dale Earnhardt	2,723 (-16)
1	3	Mark Martin	2,481 (-258)
1	4	Rusty Wallace	2,450 (–289)
1	5	Ken Schrader	2,382 (–357)
1	6	Morgan Shepherd	2,348 (–391)
	7	Ricky Rudd	2,339 (–400)
	8	Michael Waltrip	2,152 (–587)
1	9	Lake Speed	2,091 (–648)
1	10	Jeff Gordon	2,078 (–661)
Official driver's standings

- Note: Only the first 10 positions are included for the driver standings.

Previous race: 1994 Miller Genuine Draft 500	NASCAR Winston Cup Series; 1994 season	Next race: 1994 Brickyard 400
