= Tim Steele (racing driver) =

American racing driver (1968–2024)

- Born: March 1, 1968 Coopersville, Michigan, U.S.
- Died: January 7, 2024 (aged 55)
- Retired: 2007

Automobile Racing Club of America
- Years active: 1992–2006
- Starts: 146
- Wins: 41
- Poles: 31
- Best finish: 1st in 1993, 1996, 1997

Championship titles
- 1993, 1996, 1997: ARCA Re/Max Series; NAMRA Champ Car division

Awards
- 2009 1993: Michigan Motor Sports Hall of Fame; ARCA Rookie of the Year

NASCAR Cup Series career
- 5 races run over 1 year
- Best finish: 52nd (1994)
- First race: 1994 Miller Genuine Draft 400 (Michigan)
- Last race: 1994 DieHard 500 (Talladega)
Wins	Top tens	Poles
0	0	0

NASCAR O'Reilly Auto Parts Series career
- 10 races run over 3 years
- Best finish: 46th (1997)
- First race: 1993 Detroit Gasket 200 (Michigan)
- Last race: 1997 Birmingham Auto Dealers 500K (Talladega)
Wins	Top tens	Poles
0	2	0

NASCAR FedEx Freight Truck Series career
- 13 races run over 1 year
- Best finish: 25th (1999)
- First race: 1999 Florida Dodge Dealers 400 (Homestead)
- Last race: 1999 Kroger 225 (Louisville)
Wins	Top tens	Poles
0	1	1
- Statistics up to date as of July 24, 2012.

Timothy Steele (March 1, 1968 – January 7, 2024) was an American stock car racing driver. He won three ARCA Re/Max Series national championships and raced in NASCAR's highest three series. He was inducted in the Michigan Motor Sports Hall of Fame in 2009.

== Early career ==
Steele was born in Coopersville, Michigan on March 1, 1968, and began racing as a five-year-old in motorcycle ice racing. He finished second in Michigan's 125cc AMA motocross division. In 1984, the 16-year-old won the NAMRA Champ Cars division championship and was the division's Rookie of the Year; he also raced in International Jet Ski Racing events that season. He continued to move up the ladder and began racing late models at Berlin Raceway. He began racing on regional touring series, winning in the American Speed Association in 1990 and the NASCAR All Pro Series in 1992.

== ARCA career ==
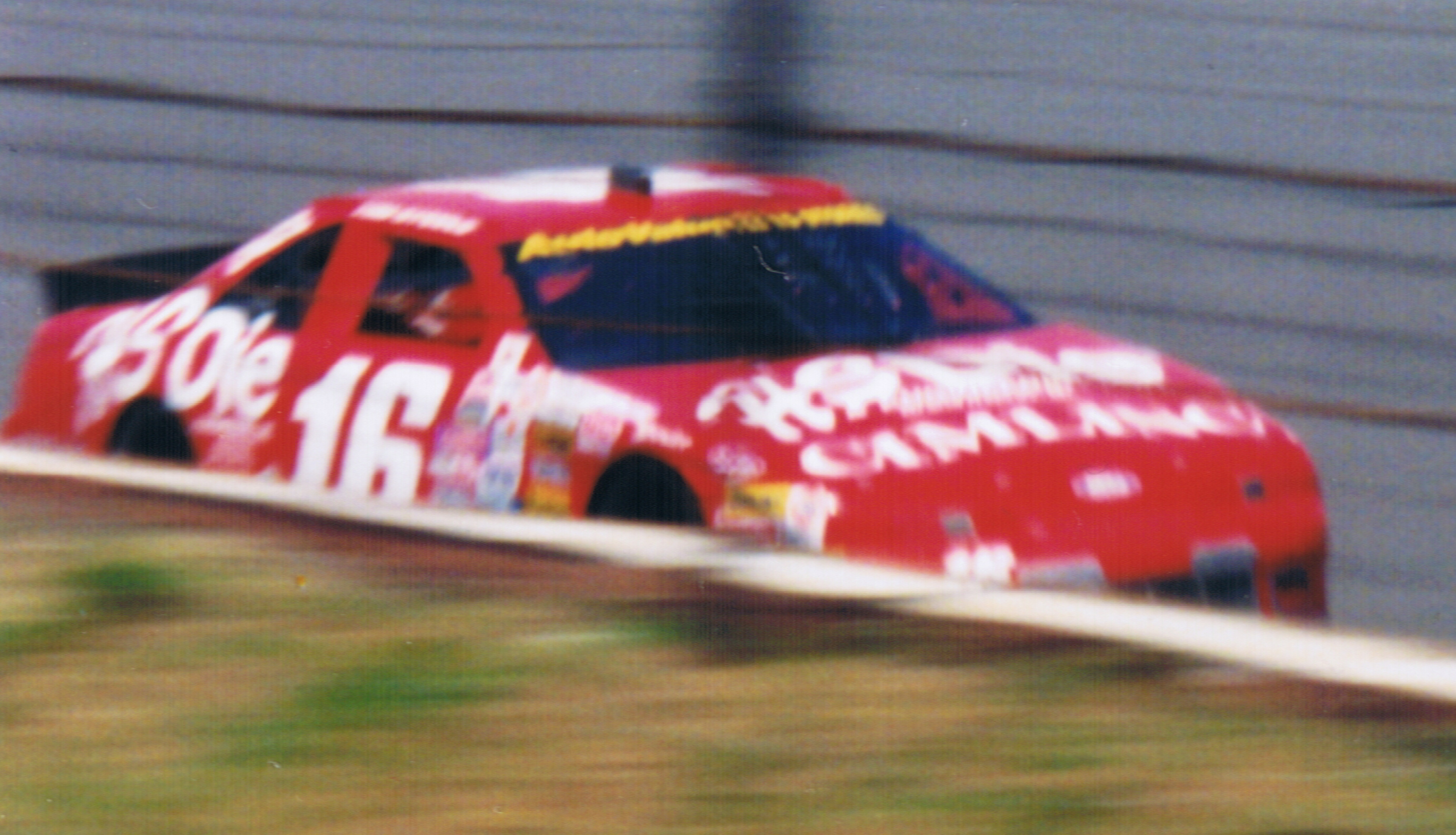
Steele's 1996 ARCA car at Pocono Raceway

Steele started out in the 1993 season driving for Harold Steele's HS Die Team. It was a very successful year. He went on to win the Championship that year and earned the Rookie of the Year award. He went on to continue winning races, also winning the championship in 1996 and 1997. Steele won twelve times in 1997, the most wins in the series since 1973.

In November 1997, Steele was involved in a serious accident while testing at Atlanta Motor Speedway. At the time he was planning on moving up to the Winston Cup Series to try and contend for rookie of the year. He was ten days away from signing up with a team to be owned by his father Harold and Green Bay Packers Quarterback Brett Favre, who were planning to purchase Bud Moore Engineering. At the time, he was diagnosed with a broken left ankle and cracked ribs. However, the accident also caused brain injuries, and doctors told him he could not handle another trauma. Much of 1998 he spent going from doctor to doctor to see if a comeback was possible. He battled a dependency on the prescription drug Oxycontin which he was taking for headaches. Finally in June 1998, Steele made his comeback to the ARCA series at Pocono; he won the race and went on to race in five more races that year winning three of them. In 1999, Steele only competed in one race at Talladega finishing 34th after a crash.

In 2000, Steele made a full-time comeback to the series. He won three races and accumulated fourteen top-ten finishes and finished third in the final points standings. In 2001, Steele won four races and finished ninth in the final points standings.

The next five years were not as successful as Steele only competed in sixteen races and earned only three top-five finishes. In 2007, after a late model crash at Toledo Speedway, Steele decided it was time to stop racing.

Between 1993 and 2006, Steele had attempted 146 races, winning 41, which equates to victories in 28% of all the races he entered. Steele's 24 victories is ARCA's all-time Superspeedway winner, including nine at Pocono Raceway. He recorded 86 top-five finishes, 101 top-tens and led 5,423 laps. That means that Steele led laps in 64% of every race he entered. He also won 31 career pole awards. He was the first ARCA driver to make over US$1,000,000 in his career, surpassing Bobby Bowsher's previous record of US$952,535 in 1998.

== Other series ==
=== Winston Cup ===
In 1994, Steele competed in five Winston Cup Series races in a car owned by Bobby Allison only managing a best finish of 33rd at Pocono. He attempted to qualify for the inaugural Brickyard 400 but failed.

=== Busch Grand National ===
In 1993, Steele competed in two Busch Grand National Series races at Michigan and Richmond for NASCAR driver Davey Allison's team. Both races ended with Did Not Finishes (DNFs). In 1994, Steele competed in one race at Michigan for his father's team; it ended in another DNF. In 1997, he competed in seven races for James Finch. This time, he managed to accumulate two top-tens and one top-five finish and an overall average finish of 19.9. This would be the last year he would compete in the series.

=== Craftsman Truck Series ===
In 1999, Steele competed in 13 Craftsman Truck Series races in a truck once again owned by his father. He accumulated one top-ten finish and led 45 laps. He averaged a nineteenth place finish and finished 25th overall in the standings.

=== Winston West ===
In 1996 and 1998, Steele competed in two Winston West Series races at Las Vegas Motor Speedway, scoring a top-five and leading fifteen laps.

== Death ==
Steele died on January 7, 2024 at age 55 due to complications following a stroke.

== Motorsports career results ==
=== NASCAR ===
(key) (Bold – Pole position awarded by qualifying time. Italics – Pole position earned by points standings or practice time. * – Most laps led.)

==== Winston Cup Series ====
NASCAR Winston Cup Series results
Year	Team	No.	Make	1	2	3	4	5	6	7	8	9	10	11	12	13	14	15	16	17	18	19	20	21	22	23	24	25	26	27	28	29	30	31	32	NWCC	Pts	Ref
1994	Bobby Allison Motorsports	12	Ford	DAY	CAR	RCH	ATL	DAR	BRI	NWS	MAR	TAL	SON	CLT	DOV	POC	MCH; 39	DAY; 43	NHA; 41	POC; 33	TAL; 38	IND; DNQ	GLN	MCH	BRI	DAR	RCH	DOV	MAR	NWS	CLT	CAR	PHO	ATL		52nd	233	
1995	H.S. Die Racing Team	02	Ford	DAY	CAR	RCH	ATL	DAR	BRI	NWS	MAR	TAL	SON	CLT	DOV	POC	MCH	DAY	NHA	POC	TAL	IND	GLN	MCH; DNQ	BRI	DAR	RCH	DOV	MAR	NWS	CLT	CAR	PHO	ATL		NA	–	
1997	H.S. Die Racing Team	61	Ford	DAY	CAR	RCH	ATL	DAR	TEX	BRI	MAR	SON	TAL	CLT	DOV	POC	MCH	CAL	DAY	NHA	POC	IND; DNQ	GLN	MCH	BRI	DAR	RCH	NHA	DOV	MAR	CLT	TAL	CAR	PHO	ATL	NA	–	

==== Busch Series ====
NASCAR Busch Series results
Year	Team	No.	Make	1	2	3	4	5	6	7	8	9	10	11	12	13	14	15	16	17	18	19	20	21	22	23	24	25	26	27	28	29	30	31	NBSC	Pts	Ref
1992			Chevy	DAY	CAR	RCH	ATL	MAR	DAR	BRI	HCY	LAN	DUB	NZH	CLT	DOV	ROU	MYB	GLN	VOL	NHA	TAL	IRP	ROU	MCH	NHA	BRI	DAR	RCH	DOV	CLT; DNQ	MAR	CAR	HCY	NA	–	
1993	Allison Racing	28	Ford	DAY	CAR	RCH	DAR	BRI	HCY	ROU	MAR	NZH	CLT	DOV	MYB	GLN	MLW	TAL	IRP	MCH; 29	NHA	BRI	DAR	RCH; 31	DOV	ROU	CLT; DNQ	MAR	CAR	HCY	ATL				77th	146	
1994	H.S. Die Racing Team	86	Ford	DAY; DNQ	CAR	RCH	ATL; DNQ	MAR	DAR	HCY	BRI	ROU	NHA	NZH; DNQ	CLT	DOV	MYB	GLN	MLW	SBO	TAL	HCY	IRP	MCH; 37	BRI	DAR	RCH	DOV	CLT	MAR	CAR				101st	52	
1997	Phoenix Racing	4	Chevy	DAY	CAR	RCH	ATL	LVS; 5	DAR; 37	HCY; 25	TEX; 21	BRI; 19	NSV; 26	TAL; 6	NHA	NZH	CLT	DOV	SBO	GLN	MLW	MYB	GTY	IRP	MCH	BRI	DAR	RCH	DOV	CLT	CAL	CAR	HOM		46th	736	

==== Craftsman Truck Series ====
NASCAR Craftsman Truck Series results
Year	Team	No.	Make	1	2	3	4	5	6	7	8	9	10	11	12	13	14	15	16	17	18	19	20	21	22	23	24	25	NCTC	Pts	Ref
1999	Steele Racing	21	Ford	HOM; 25	PHO; 22	EVG	MMR	MAR; 23	MEM; 17	PPR; 13	I70; 30	BRI	TEX	PIR	GLN	MLW; 14	**NSV**; 9	NZH	MCH; 14	NHA	IRP; 14	GTY; 19	HPT	RCH; 21	LVS	LVL; 26	TEX	CAL	25th	1385	

==== Busch North Series ====
NASCAR Busch North Series results
Year	Team	No.	Make	1	2	3	4	5	6	7	8	9	10	11	12	13	14	15	16	17	18	19	20	NBNC	Pts	Ref
1994	Steele Racing	86	Ford	NHA	NHA	MND	NZH; DNQ	SPE	HOL	GLN	JEN	EPP	GLN	NHA	WIS	STA	TMP	MND	WMM	RPS	LEE	NHA	LRP	N/A	0	

==== Winston West Series ====
NASCAR Winston West Series results
Year	Team	No.	Make	1	2	3	4	5	6	7	8	9	10	11	12	13	14	15	NWWC	Pts	Ref
1996	Steele Racing	6	Ford	TUS	AMP	MMR	SON	MAD	POR	TUS	EVG	CNS	MAD	MMR	SON	MMR	PHO	LVS; 2	46th	175	
1997	Steele Racing	61	Ford	TUS	AMP	SON	TUS	MMR	LVS	CAL	EVG	POR	PPR	AMP	SON	MMR	LVS; DNQ		85th	31	
1998	Steele Racing	61	Ford	TUS	LVS	PHO	CAL	HPT	MMR	AMP	POR	CAL	PPR	EVG	SON	MMR	LVS; 31		91st	70	

=== ARCA Re/Max Series ===
(key) (Bold – Pole position awarded by qualifying time. Italics – Pole position earned by points standings or practice time. * – Most laps led.)

ARCA Re/Max Series results
Year	Team	No.	Make	1	2	3	4	5	6	7	8	9	10	11	12	13	14	15	16	17	18	19	20	21	22	23	24	25	ARMC	Pts	Ref
1993	Steele Racing	16	Ford	DAY; 25			TAL; 1*					POC; 8	MCH; 3*		POC; 1*							ATL; 41							1st	5070	
1993	Steele Racing	16	Olds		**FIF**; 22*	TWS; 3		KIL; 5	CMS; 2	**FRS**; 13	TOL; 12			FRS; 11		KIL; 2	ISF; 2	DSF; 3	TOL; 4	SLM; 20*	**WIN**; 1*								1st	5070	
1994	Steele Racing	16	Ford	DAY; 2	TAL; 36	FIF	LVL	KIL	TOL	FRS	MCH; 37	DMS	**POC**; 1*	**POC**; 9	KIL	FRS	INF	I70	ISF	DSF	TOL	SLM	WIN	ATL; 15*					24th	1240	
1995	Steele Racing	16	Ford	DAY; 42	ATL; 30	TAL; 41	FIF	KIL	FRS	MCH; 2*	I80; 23		FRS; 6	POC; 3	POC; 2		FRS; 2		LVL; 4	ISF	DSF; 3	**SLM**; 1*	**WIN**; 1*	ATL; 1					12th	3440	
1995	Steele Racing	16	Chevy									MCS; 24				KIL; 25		SBS; 25											12th	3440	
1996	Steele Racing	16	Ford	DAY; 2	ATL; 1*	SLM; 6	**TAL**; 1*	FIF; 3	LVL; 4*	CLT; 1*	**CLT**; 1*	KIL; 1	FRS; 4	POC; 2*	MCH; 7	FRS; 1*	TOL; 16*	POC; 1*	MCH; 1*	INF; 26	SBS; 8	ISF; 1	DSF; 2	KIL; 8	**SLM**; 1*	**WIN**; 14*	CLT; 1*	ATL; 6*	1st	6980	
1997	Steele Racing	16	Ford	DAY; 38	ATL; 1*	SLM; 1*	CLT; 34	CLT; 37	**POC**; 1*	MCH; 1	**SBS**; 1	TOL; 8	KIL; 6	FRS; 1*	MIN; 3*	**POC**; 1*	MCH; 3*	DSF; 17	**GTW**; 2*	**SLM**; 1*	**WIN**; 1*	**CLT**; 1*	**TAL**; 1	ISF; 1*	ATL				1st	5810	
1998	Steele Racing	16	Ford	DAY	ATL	SLM	CLT	MEM	MCH	POC; 1*	SBS	**TOL**; 2*	**PPR**; 1*	**POC**; 1*	KIL	FRS	ISF	**ATL**; 30*	DSF	SLM	TEX	WIN; DNQ	CLT	**TAL**; 1*	ATL				NA	–	
1999	Steele Racing	16	Ford	DAY	ATL	SLM	AND	CLT	MCH	POC	TOL	SBS	BLN	POC	KIL	FRS	FLM	ISF	WIN	DSF	SLM	CLT	TAL; 34	ATL					138th	75	
2000	Steele Racing	16	Ford	DAY	SLM; 3	AND; 13	**CLT**; 3	KIL; 2	FRS; 18	MCH; 1*	**POC**; 6	**TOL**; 2	KEN; 1*	**BLN**; 1*	POC; 4	WIN; 13	ISF; 7	KEN; 2	DSF; 21	SLM; 2	CLT; 10	TAL; 2	ATL; 29						3rd	4665	
2001	Steele Racing	16	Ford	DAY; 25	NSH; 7	WIN; 1	SLM; 2	**GTY**; 3	KEN; 2	**CLT**; 3	KAN; 3	MCH; 9	POC; 1*	MEM; 14	GLN	KEN	MCH; 3	POC; 1	NSH	ISF	**CHI**; 3	DSF	SLM	TOL	BLN; 1*	**CLT**; 5	TAL	ATL; 5	9th	4300	
2002	Steele Racing	16	Ford	DAY	ATL; 32	NSH	SLM	KEN; 38	CLT	KAN	POC	MCH; 12	TOL	SBO	KEN	BLN; 29	POC	NSH	ISF	WIN	DSF	CHI	SLM	TAL	CLT; 40				70th	430	
2003	Steele Racing	16	Dodge	DAY; 35	ATL; 35	NSH; 39	SLM	TOL	KEN	CLT	BLN	KAN	MCH; 5	LER	POC	POC	NSH	ISF	WIN	DSF	CHI	SLM	TAL	CLT	SBO				76th	350	
2004	Steele Racing	16	Dodge	DAY	NSH	SLM	KEN	TOL	CLT	KAN	POC	MCH	SBO	BLN	KEN	GTW	POC	LER	NSH	ISF	TOL	DSF	CHI; 34	SLM	TAL				174th	65	
2005	Lee Leslie	44	Ford	DAY; 29	NSH	SLM	KEN	TOL	LAN	MIL	POC	MCH; 30	KAN	KEN	BLN; 3	POC	GTW	LER	NSH	MCH	ISF	TOL	DSF	CHI; 5	SLM; 32	TAL			53rd	655	
2006	Brack Maggard	65	Chevy	DAY	NSH	SLM	WIN	KEN	TOL	POC	MCH	KAN	KEN	BLN; 17	POC	GTW	NSH	MCH	ISF	MIL	TOL	DSF	CHI	SLM	TAL	IOW			121st	145	

Sporting positions
Preceded by Bobby Bowsher	ARCA Series champion 1993	Succeeded by Bobby Bowsher
Preceded by Andy Hillenburg	ARCA Bondo/Mar-Hyde Series champion 1996–1997	Succeeded by Frank Kimmel
