= 1994 Slick 50 300 =

16th race of the 1994 NASCAR Winston Cup Series

Race details
- Race 16 of 31 in the 1994 NASCAR Winston Cup Series
- The 1994 Slick 50 300 program cover, featuring Harry Gant.
- Date: July 10, 1994
- Official name: 2nd Annual Slick 50 300
- Location: Loudon, New Hampshire, New Hampshire International Speedway
- Course: Permanent racing facility
- Course length: 1.058 miles (1.704 km)
- Distance: 300 laps, 317.4 mi (510.805 km)
- Scheduled distance: 300 laps, 317.4 mi (510.805 km)
- Average speed: 87.599 miles per hour (140.977 km/h)
- Attendance: 72,000

Pole position
Driver	Ernie Irvan	Robert Yates Racing
- Time: 29.944

Most laps led
Driver	Ernie Irvan	Robert Yates Racing
- Laps: 176

Winner
No. 10	Ricky Rudd	Rudd Performance Motorsports

Television in the United States
- Network: TNN
- Announcers: Mike Joy, Buddy Baker, Kenny Wallace

Radio in the United States
- Radio: Motor Racing Network

The 1994 Slick 50 300 was the 16th stock car race of the 1994 NASCAR Winston Cup Series season and the 36th iteration of the event. The race was held on Sunday, July 10, 1994, in Loudon, New Hampshire, at New Hampshire International Speedway, a 1.058-mile (1.703 km) permanent, oval-shaped, low-banked racetrack. The race took the scheduled 300 laps to complete. On the final restart of the race with eight laps to go, Ricky Rudd, driving for his own Rudd Performance Motorsports team would manage to hold off the field to take his 15th career NASCAR Winston Cup Series victory and his only victory of the season. Meanwhile, second-place finisher, Richard Childress Racing driver Dale Earnhardt would retake the overall driver's championship lead after a poor finish from then-points leader Ernie Irvan. To fill out the top three, Penske Racing South driver Rusty Wallace would finish third.

== Background ==
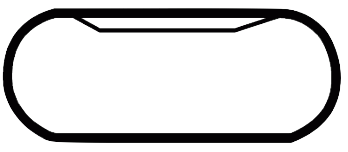
The layout of New Hampshire International Speedway, the venue where the race was held.

New Hampshire International Speedway is a 1.058-mile (1.703 km) oval speedway located in Loudon, New Hampshire which has hosted NASCAR racing annually since the early 1990s, as well as an IndyCar weekend and the oldest motorcycle race in North America, the Loudon Classic. Nicknamed "The Magic Mile", the speedway is often converted into a 1.6-mile (2.6 km) road course, which includes much of the oval. The track was originally the site of Bryar Motorsports Park before being purchased and redeveloped by Bob Bahre. The track is currently one of eight major NASCAR tracks owned and operated by Speedway Motorsports.

=== Entry list ===
- (R) denotes rookie driver.

#	Driver	Team	Make
1	Rick Mast	Precision Products Racing	Ford
2	Rusty Wallace	Penske Racing South	Ford
02	Jeremy Mayfield (R)	Taylor Racing	Ford
3	Dale Earnhardt	Richard Childress Racing	Chevrolet
03	Jamie Aube	Doug Innis Racing	Chevrolet
4	Sterling Marlin	Morgan–McClure Motorsports	Chevrolet
5	Terry Labonte	Hendrick Motorsports	Chevrolet
6	Mark Martin	Roush Racing	Ford
7	Geoff Bodine	Geoff Bodine Racing	Ford
8	Jeff Burton (R)	Stavola Brothers Racing	Ford
9	Rich Bickle (R)	Melling Racing	Ford
10	Ricky Rudd	Rudd Performance Motorsports	Ford
11	Bill Elliott	Junior Johnson & Associates	Ford
12	Tim Steele	Bobby Allison Motorsports	Ford
14	John Andretti (R)	Hagan Racing	Chevrolet
15	Lake Speed	Bud Moore Engineering	Ford
16	Ted Musgrave	Roush Racing	Ford
17	Darrell Waltrip	Darrell Waltrip Motorsports	Chevrolet
18	Dale Jarrett	Joe Gibbs Racing	Chevrolet
19	Loy Allen Jr. (R)	TriStar Motorsports	Ford
20	Randy LaJoie	Moroso Racing	Ford
21	Morgan Shepherd	Wood Brothers Racing	Ford
22	Bobby Labonte	Bill Davis Racing	Pontiac
23	Hut Stricklin	Travis Carter Enterprises	Ford
24	Jeff Gordon	Hendrick Motorsports	Chevrolet
25	Ken Schrader	Hendrick Motorsports	Chevrolet
26	Brett Bodine	King Racing	Ford
27	Jimmy Spencer	Junior Johnson & Associates	Ford
28	Ernie Irvan	Robert Yates Racing	Ford
29	Steve Grissom	Diamond Ridge Motorsports	Chevrolet
30	Michael Waltrip	Bahari Racing	Pontiac
31	Ward Burton	A.G. Dillard Motorsports	Chevrolet
32	Dick Trickle	Active Motorsports	Chevrolet
33	Harry Gant	Leo Jackson Motorsports	Chevrolet
34	Mike McLaughlin	Team 34	Chevrolet
40	Bobby Hamilton	SABCO Racing	Pontiac
41	Joe Nemechek (R)	Larry Hedrick Motorsports	Chevrolet
42	Kyle Petty	SABCO Racing	Pontiac
43	Wally Dallenbach Jr.	Petty Enterprises	Pontiac
54	Robert Pressley	Leo Jackson Motorsports	Chevrolet
55	Jimmy Hensley	RaDiUs Motorsports	Ford
62	Joe Bessey	Gray Racing	Ford
71	Dave Marcis	Marcis Auto Racing	Chevrolet
75	Todd Bodine	Butch Mock Motorsports	Ford
77	Greg Sacks	U.S. Motorsports Inc.	Ford
90	Mike Wallace (R)	Donlavey Racing	Ford
98	Derrike Cope	Cale Yarborough Motorsports	Ford

== Qualifying ==
Qualifying was split into two rounds. The first round was held on Friday, July 8, at 3:30 PM EST. Each driver would have one lap to set a time. During the first round, the top 20 drivers in the round would be guaranteed a starting spot in the race. If a driver was not able to guarantee a spot in the first round, they had the option to scrub their time from the first round and try and run a faster lap time in a second round qualifying run, held on Saturday, July 9, at 11:00 AM EST. As with the first round, each driver would have one lap to set a time. For this specific race, positions 21-40 would be decided on time, and depending on who needed it, a select amount of positions were given to cars who had not otherwise qualified but were high enough in owner's points; up to two provisionals were given. If needed, a past champion who did not qualify on either time or provisionals could use a champion's provisional, adding one more spot to the field.

Ernie Irvan, driving for Robert Yates Racing, won the pole, setting a time of 29.944 and an average speed of 127.197 mph (204.704 km/h) in the first round. In the second round, Junior Johnson & Associates driver Bill Elliott would manage to beat his time with a time of 29.755; however, since the time was in the second round, Elliott would only garner the 21st starting position.

Fiver drivers would fail to qualify.

=== Full qualifying results ===
Pos.	#	Driver	Team	Make	Time	Speed
1	28	Ernie Irvan	Robert Yates Racing	Ford	29.944	127.197
2	24	Jeff Gordon	Hendrick Motorsports	Chevrolet	30.018	126.884
3	10	Ricky Rudd	Rudd Performance Motorsports	Ford	30.075	126.643
4	22	Bobby Labonte	Bill Davis Racing	Pontiac	30.109	126.500
5	25	Ken Schrader	Hendrick Motorsports	Chevrolet	30.122	126.446
6	16	Ted Musgrave	Roush Racing	Ford	30.153	126.316
7	4	Sterling Marlin	Morgan–McClure Motorsports	Chevrolet	30.204	126.103
8	98	Derrike Cope	Cale Yarborough Motorsports	Ford	30.260	125.869
9	21	Morgan Shepherd	Wood Brothers Racing	Ford	30.276	125.803
10	6	Mark Martin	Roush Racing	Ford	30.279	125.790
11	5	Terry Labonte	Hendrick Motorsports	Chevrolet	30.296	125.720
12	30	Michael Waltrip	Bahari Racing	Pontiac	30.343	125.525
13	27	Jimmy Spencer	Junior Johnson & Associates	Ford	30.343	125.525
14	17	Darrell Waltrip	Darrell Waltrip Motorsports	Chevrolet	30.402	125.281
15	75	Todd Bodine	Butch Mock Motorsports	Ford	30.402	125.281
16	7	Geoff Bodine	Geoff Bodine Racing	Ford	30.416	125.224
17	71	Dave Marcis	Marcis Auto Racing	Chevrolet	30.426	125.182
18	2	Rusty Wallace	Penske Racing South	Ford	30.430	125.166
19	20	Randy LaJoie	Moroso Racing	Ford	30.445	125.104
20	55	Jimmy Hensley	RaDiUs Motorsports	Ford	30.451	125.080
Failed to lock in Round 1
21	11	Bill Elliott	Junior Johnson & Associates	Ford	29.755	128.005
22	1	Rick Mast	Precision Products Racing	Ford	29.764	127.967
23	26	Brett Bodine	King Racing	Ford	29.810	127.769
24	14	John Andretti (R)	Hagan Racing	Chevrolet	29.852	127.589
25	29	Steve Grissom (R)	Diamond Ridge Motorsports	Chevrolet	29.946	127.189
26	9	Rich Bickle (R)	Melling Racing	Ford	30.006	126.935
27	77	Greg Sacks	U.S. Motorsports Inc.	Ford	30.033	126.820
28	3	Dale Earnhardt	Richard Childress Racing	Chevrolet	30.085	126.601
29	32	Dick Trickle	Active Motorsports	Chevrolet	30.095	126.559
30	23	Hut Stricklin	Travis Carter Enterprises	Ford	30.108	126.505
31	18	Dale Jarrett	Joe Gibbs Racing	Chevrolet	30.153	126.316
32	33	Harry Gant	Leo Jackson Motorsports	Chevrolet	30.169	126.249
33	31	Ward Burton (R)	A.G. Dillard Motorsports	Chevrolet	30.169	126.249
34	15	Lake Speed	Bud Moore Engineering	Ford	30.177	126.215
35	41	Joe Nemechek (R)	Larry Hedrick Motorsports	Chevrolet	30.200	126.119
36	90	Mike Wallace (R)	Donlavey Racing	Ford	30.219	126.040
37	02	Jeremy Mayfield (R)	Taylor Racing	Ford	30.220	126.036
38	40	Bobby Hamilton	SABCO Racing	Pontiac	30.247	125.923
39	8	Jeff Burton (R)	Stavola Brothers Racing	Ford	30.275	125.807
40	34	Mike McLaughlin	Team 34	Chevrolet	30.286	125.761
Provisionals
41	42	Kyle Petty	SABCO Racing	Pontiac	30.527	124.768
42	12	Tim Steele	Bobby Allison Motorsports	Ford	30.361	125.450
Failed to qualify
43	19	Loy Allen Jr. (R)	TriStar Motorsports	Ford	-*	-*
44	43	Wally Dallenbach Jr.	Petty Enterprises	Pontiac	-*	-*
45	54	Robert Pressley	Leo Jackson Motorsports	Chevrolet	-*	-*
46	62	Joe Bessey	Gray Racing	Ford	-*	-*
47	03	Jamie Aube	Doug Innis Racing	Chevrolet	-*	-*
Official first round qualifying results
Official starting lineup

== Race results ==
Fin	St	#	Driver	Team	Make	Laps	Led	Status	Pts	Winnings
1	3	10	Ricky Rudd	Rudd Performance Motorsports	Ford	300	55	running	180	$91,875
2	28	3	Dale Earnhardt	Richard Childress Racing	Chevrolet	300	29	running	175	$68,000
3	18	2	Rusty Wallace	Penske Racing South	Ford	300	0	running	165	$38,975
4	10	6	Mark Martin	Roush Racing	Ford	300	0	running	160	$33,625
5	15	75	Todd Bodine	Butch Mock Motorsports	Ford	300	0	running	155	$21,850
6	9	21	Morgan Shepherd	Wood Brothers Racing	Ford	300	0	running	150	$21,275
7	6	16	Ted Musgrave	Roush Racing	Ford	300	2	running	151	$20,475
8	41	42	Kyle Petty	SABCO Racing	Pontiac	300	0	running	142	$25,975
9	22	1	Rick Mast	Precision Products Racing	Ford	300	12	running	143	$20,175
10	7	4	Sterling Marlin	Morgan–McClure Motorsports	Chevrolet	300	4	running	139	$25,125
11	11	5	Terry Labonte	Hendrick Motorsports	Chevrolet	300	0	running	130	$22,675
12	23	26	Brett Bodine	King Racing	Ford	300	0	running	127	$19,775
13	4	22	Bobby Labonte	Bill Davis Racing	Pontiac	300	1	running	129	$19,575
14	31	18	Dale Jarrett	Joe Gibbs Racing	Chevrolet	300	0	running	121	$23,775
15	34	15	Lake Speed	Bud Moore Engineering	Ford	300	0	running	118	$22,625
16	21	11	Bill Elliott	Junior Johnson & Associates	Ford	300	0	running	115	$19,925
17	32	33	Harry Gant	Leo Jackson Motorsports	Chevrolet	300	0	running	112	$18,625
18	17	71	Dave Marcis	Marcis Auto Racing	Chevrolet	300	3	running	114	$14,425
19	35	41	Joe Nemechek (R)	Larry Hedrick Motorsports	Chevrolet	299	0	running	106	$15,225
20	19	20	Randy LaJoie	Moroso Racing	Ford	299	0	running	103	$12,175
21	26	9	Rich Bickle (R)	Melling Racing	Ford	299	0	running	100	$11,400
22	40	34	Mike McLaughlin	Team 34	Chevrolet	299	0	running	97	$11,300
23	14	17	Darrell Waltrip	Darrell Waltrip Motorsports	Chevrolet	299	0	running	94	$17,800
24	5	25	Ken Schrader	Hendrick Motorsports	Chevrolet	298	0	running	91	$17,700
25	27	77	Greg Sacks	U.S. Motorsports Inc.	Ford	298	0	running	88	$13,500
26	37	02	Jeremy Mayfield (R)	Taylor Racing	Ford	298	0	running	85	$11,400
27	24	14	John Andretti (R)	Hagan Racing	Chevrolet	294	0	running	82	$14,800
28	36	90	Mike Wallace (R)	Donlavey Racing	Ford	291	0	crash	79	$13,100
29	20	55	Jimmy Hensley	RaDiUs Motorsports	Ford	288	0	crash	76	$10,600
30	1	28	Ernie Irvan	Robert Yates Racing	Ford	284	176	crash	83	$31,600
31	16	7	Geoff Bodine	Geoff Bodine Racing	Ford	284	8	crash	75	$16,700
32	13	27	Jimmy Spencer	Junior Johnson & Associates	Ford	281	0	running	67	$12,500
33	25	29	Steve Grissom (R)	Diamond Ridge Motorsports	Chevrolet	279	0	crash	64	$12,300
34	29	32	Dick Trickle	Active Motorsports	Chevrolet	252	0	running	61	$12,100
35	8	98	Derrike Cope	Cale Yarborough Motorsports	Ford	246	0	crash	58	$12,000
36	30	23	Hut Stricklin	Travis Carter Enterprises	Ford	227	0	running	55	$11,400
37	12	30	Michael Waltrip	Bahari Racing	Pontiac	180	1	oil pump	57	$13,800
38	39	8	Jeff Burton (R)	Stavola Brothers Racing	Ford	168	0	engine	49	$13,700
39	2	24	Jeff Gordon	Hendrick Motorsports	Chevrolet	160	9	crash	51	$22,100
40	38	40	Bobby Hamilton	SABCO Racing	Pontiac	122	0	crash	43	$13,500
41	42	12	Tim Steele	Bobby Allison Motorsports	Ford	103	0	crash	40	$13,500
42	33	31	Ward Burton (R)	A.G. Dillard Motorsports	Chevrolet	100	0	electrical	37	$9,500
Official race results

== Standings after the race ==
Drivers' Championship standings

	Pos	Driver	Points
1	1	Dale Earnhardt	2,511
1	2	Ernie Irvan	2,507 (-4)
	3	Rusty Wallace	2,270 (-241)
	4	Mark Martin	2,256 (–255)
	5	Ken Schrader	2,171 (–340)
	6	Morgan Shepherd	2,070 (–441)
	7	Ricky Rudd	2,038 (–473)
	8	Michael Waltrip	1,901 (–610)
2	9	Ted Musgrave	1,887 (–624)
1	10	Jeff Gordon	1,866 (–645)
Official driver's standings

- Note: Only the first 10 positions are included for the driver standings.

Previous race: 1994 Pepsi 400	NASCAR Winston Cup Series; 1994 season	Next race: 1994 Miller Genuine Draft 500
