= 1993 Winston 500 =

Ninth race of the 1993 NASCAR Winston Cup Series

Race details
- Race 9 of 30 in the 1993 NASCAR Winston Cup Series
- The 1993 Winston 500 program cover, featuring Davey Allison.
- Date: May 2, 1993
- Official name: 24th Annual Winston 500
- Location: Lincoln, Alabama, Talladega Superspeedway
- Course: Permanent racing facility
- Course length: 2.66 miles (4.28 km)
- Distance: 188 laps, 500.08 mi (804.8 km)
- Average speed: 155.412 miles per hour (250.111 km/h)
- Attendance: 145,000

Pole position
Driver	Dale Earnhardt	Richard Childress Racing
- Time: 49.783

Most laps led
Driver	Dale Earnhardt	Richard Childress Racing
- Laps: 102

Winner
No. 4	Ernie Irvan	Morgan-McClure Motorsports

Television in the United States
- Network: ESPN
- Announcers: Bob Jenkins, Ned Jarrett, Benny Parsons

Radio in the United States
- Radio: Motor Racing Network

The 1993 Winston 500 was the ninth stock car race of the 1993 NASCAR Winston Cup Series season and the 24th iteration of the event. The race was held on Sunday, May 2, 1993, before an audience of 145,000 in Lincoln, Alabama at Talladega Superspeedway, a 2.66 miles (4.28 km) permanent triangle-shaped superspeedway. The race took the scheduled 188 laps to complete. After a rain-delay late into the race, NASCAR officials determined to let the race finish under a two-lap shootout. In a late-race charge, Morgan–McClure Motorsports driver Ernie Irvan would charge from fourth to first on the final lap to take his seventh career NASCAR Winston Cup Series victory and his first victory of the season. To fill out the top three, Bobby Allison Motorsports driver Jimmy Spencer and Joe Gibbs Racing driver Dale Jarrett would finish second and third, respectively.

At the finish of the race, Rusty Wallace would suffer a major crash while crossing the finish line. Coming to the finish, Dale Earnhardt would send Wallace into an airborne spin, sending Wallace into a series of flips and tumbles, crossing the finish line in sixth. With the car destroyed, Wallace was transferred to a Birmingham, Alabama hospital where he was diagnosed with a concussion and a broken left wrist.

== Background ==
The layout of Talladega Superspeedway, the venue where the race was held.

Talladega Superspeedway, originally known as Alabama International Motor Superspeedway (AIMS), is a motorsports complex located north of Talladega, Alabama. It is located on the former Anniston Air Force Base in the small city of Lincoln. The track is a tri-oval and was constructed in the 1960s by the International Speedway Corporation, a business controlled by the France family. Talladega is most known for its steep banking and the unique location of the start/finish line that's located just past the exit to pit road. The track currently hosts the NASCAR series such as the NASCAR Cup Series, Xfinity Series and the Camping World Truck Series. Talladega is the longest NASCAR oval, a 2.66-mile-long (4.28 km) tri-oval like the Daytona International Speedway, which also is a 2.5-mile-long (4.0 km) tri-oval.

=== Entry list ===
- (R) denotes rookie driver.

#	Driver	Team	Make
0	Delma Cowart	H. L. Waters Racing	Ford
1	Rick Mast	Precision Products Racing	Ford
2	Rusty Wallace	Penske Racing South	Pontiac
3	Dale Earnhardt	Richard Childress Racing	Chevrolet
4	Ernie Irvan	Morgan–McClure Motorsports	Chevrolet
5	Ricky Rudd	Hendrick Motorsports	Chevrolet
6	Mark Martin	Roush Racing	Ford
7	Jimmy Hensley	AK Racing	Ford
8	Sterling Marlin	Stavola Brothers Racing	Ford
9	P. J. Jones (R)	Melling Racing	Ford
11	Bill Elliott	Junior Johnson & Associates	Ford
12	Jimmy Spencer	Bobby Allison Motorsports	Ford
14	Terry Labonte	Hagan Racing	Chevrolet
15	Geoff Bodine	Bud Moore Engineering	Ford
16	Wally Dallenbach Jr.	Roush Racing	Ford
17	Darrell Waltrip	Darrell Waltrip Motorsports	Chevrolet
18	Dale Jarrett	Joe Gibbs Racing	Chevrolet
20	Joe Ruttman	Moroso Racing	Ford
21	Morgan Shepherd	Wood Brothers Racing	Ford
22	Bobby Labonte (R)	Bill Davis Racing	Ford
24	Jeff Gordon (R)	Hendrick Motorsports	Chevrolet
25	Ken Schrader	Hendrick Motorsports	Chevrolet
26	Brett Bodine	King Racing	Ford
27	Hut Stricklin	Junior Johnson & Associates	Ford
28	Davey Allison	Robert Yates Racing	Ford
30	Michael Waltrip	Bahari Racing	Pontiac
31	Steve Kinser	Folsom Racing	Chevrolet
32	Jimmy Horton	Active Motorsports	Chevrolet
33	Harry Gant	Leo Jackson Motorsports	Chevrolet
40	Kenny Wallace (R)	SABCO Racing	Pontiac
41	Phil Parsons	Larry Hedrick Motorsports	Chevrolet
42	Kyle Petty	SABCO Racing	Pontiac
44	Rick Wilson	Petty Enterprises	Pontiac
45	Rich Bickle	Terminal Trucking Motorsports	Ford
48	James Hylton	Hylton Motorsports	Pontiac
49	Stanley Smith	BS&S Motorsports	Chevrolet
51	Jeff Purvis	Phoenix Racing	Chevrolet
52	Jimmy Means	Jimmy Means Racing	Ford
53	Ritchie Petty	Petty Brothers Racing	Ford
55	Ted Musgrave	RaDiUs Motorsports	Ford
62	Ben Hess	Gray Racing	Ford
65	Jerry O'Neil	O'Neil Racing	Oldsmobile
68	Greg Sacks	TriStar Motorsports	Ford
71	Dave Marcis	Marcis Auto Racing	Chevrolet
73	Phil Barkdoll	Barkdoll Racing	Oldsmobile
75	Dick Trickle	Butch Mock Motorsports	Ford
83	Lake Speed	Speed Racing	Ford
85	Ken Bouchard	Mansion Motorsports	Ford
90	Bobby Hillin Jr.	Donlavey Racing	Ford
98	Derrike Cope	Cale Yarborough Motorsports	Ford

== Qualifying ==
Qualifying was split into two rounds. The first round was held on Friday, April 30, at 4:00 PM EST. Each driver would have one lap to set a time. During the first round, the top 20 drivers in the round would be guaranteed a starting spot in the race. If a driver was not able to guarantee a spot in the first round, they had the option to scrub their time from the first round and try and run a faster lap time in a second round qualifying run, held on Saturday, May 1, at 11:30 AM EST. As with the first round, each driver would have one lap to set a time. For this specific race, positions 21-32 would be decided on time, and depending on who needed it, a select amount of positions were given to cars who had not otherwise qualified but were high enough in owner's points; up to two were given. If needed, a past champion who did not qualify on either time or provisionals could use a champion's provisional, adding one more spot to the field.

Dale Earnhardt, driving for Richard Childress Racing, would win the pole, setting a time of 49.783 and an average speed of 192.355 miles per hour (309.565 km/h) in the first round.

Nine drivers would fail to qualify.

=== Full qualifying results ===
Pos.	#	Driver	Team	Make	Time	Speed
1	3	Dale Earnhardt	Richard Childress Racing	Chevrolet	49.783	192.355
2	12	Jimmy Spencer	Bobby Allison Motorsports	Ford	50.249	190.571
3	18	Dale Jarrett	Joe Gibbs Racing	Chevrolet	50.252	190.560
4	44	Rick Wilson	Petty Enterprises	Pontiac	50.311	190.336
5	28	Davey Allison	Robert Yates Racing	Ford	50.332	190.257
6	20	Joe Ruttman	Moroso Racing	Ford	50.341	190.223
7	16	Wally Dallenbach Jr.	Roush Racing	Ford	50.356	190.166
8	25	Ken Schrader	Hendrick Motorsports	Chevrolet	50.360	190.151
9	21	Morgan Shepherd	Wood Brothers Racing	Ford	50.366	190.128
10	11	Bill Elliott	Junior Johnson & Associates	Ford	50.386	190.053
11	6	Mark Martin	Roush Racing	Ford	50.387	190.049
12	26	Brett Bodine	King Racing	Ford	50.396	190.015
13	30	Michael Waltrip	Bahari Racing	Pontiac	50.466	189.752
14	8	Sterling Marlin	Stavola Brothers Racing	Ford	50.528	189.519
15	98	Derrike Cope	Cale Yarborough Motorsports	Ford	50.537	189.485
16	4	Ernie Irvan	Morgan–McClure Motorsports	Chevrolet	50.545	189.455
17	40	Kenny Wallace (R)	SABCO Racing	Pontiac	50.561	189.395
18	51	Jeff Purvis	Phoenix Racing	Chevrolet	50.589	189.290
19	1	Rick Mast	Precision Products Racing	Ford	50.617	189.185
20	22	Bobby Labonte (R)	Bill Davis Racing	Ford	50.617	189.185
Failed to lock in Round 1
21	42	Kyle Petty	SABCO Racing	Pontiac	50.496	189.639
22	68	Greg Sacks	TriStar Motorsports	Ford	50.622	189.167
23	55	Ted Musgrave	RaDiUs Motorsports	Ford	50.646	189.077
24	2	Rusty Wallace	Penske Racing South	Pontiac	50.664	189.010
25	27	Hut Stricklin	Junior Johnson & Associates	Ford	50.795	188.522
26	5	Ricky Rudd	Hendrick Motorsports	Chevrolet	50.843	188.345
27	75	Dick Trickle	Butch Mock Motorsports	Ford	50.855	188.300
28	52	Jimmy Means	Jimmy Means Racing	Ford	50.916	188.074
29	7	Jimmy Hensley	AK Racing	Ford	50.940	187.986
30	24	Jeff Gordon (R)	Hendrick Motorsports	Chevrolet	51.041	187.614
31	15	Geoff Bodine	Bud Moore Engineering	Ford	51.209	186.998
32	83	Lake Speed	Speed Racing	Ford	51.211	186.991
33	17	Darrell Waltrip	Darrell Waltrip Motorsports	Chevrolet	51.346	186.499
34	53	Ritchie Petty	Petty Brothers Racing	Ford	51.421	186.227
35	32	Jimmy Horton	Active Motorsports	Chevrolet	51.494	185.963
36	45	Rich Bickle	Terminal Trucking Motorsports	Ford	51.495	185.960
37	33	Harry Gant	Leo Jackson Motorsports	Chevrolet	51.569	185.693
38	14	Terry Labonte	Hagan Racing	Chevrolet	51.579	185.657
39	41	Phil Parsons	Larry Hedrick Motorsports	Chevrolet	51.589	185.621
40	85	Ken Bouchard	Mansion Motorsports	Ford	51.641	185.434
Provisional
41	90	Bobby Hillin Jr.	Donlavey Racing	Ford	-*	-*
Failed to qualify
42	9	P. J. Jones (R)	Melling Racing	Ford	-*	-*
43	48	James Hylton	Hylton Motorsports	Pontiac	-*	-*
44	0	Delma Cowart	H. L. Waters Racing	Ford	-*	-*
45	31	Steve Kinser	Folsom Racing	Chevrolet	-*	-*
46	62	Ben Hess	Gray Racing	Ford	-*	-*
47	71	Dave Marcis	Marcis Auto Racing	Chevrolet	-*	-*
48	73	Phil Barkdoll	Barkdoll Racing	Oldsmobile	-*	-*
49	65	Jerry O'Neil	O'Neil Racing	Oldsmobile	-*	-*
50	49	Stanley Smith	BS&S Motorsports	Chevrolet	-*	-*
Official first round qualifying results
Official starting lineup

== Race results ==
Fin	St	#	Driver	Team	Make	Laps	Led	Status	Pts	Winnings
1	16	4	Ernie Irvan	Morgan–McClure Motorsports	Chevrolet	188	3	running	180	$85,875
2	2	12	Jimmy Spencer	Bobby Allison Motorsports	Ford	188	1	running	175	$56,850
3	3	18	Dale Jarrett	Joe Gibbs Racing	Chevrolet	188	35	running	170	$44,870
4	1	3	Dale Earnhardt	Richard Childress Racing	Chevrolet	188	102	running	170	$39,870
5	6	20	Joe Ruttman	Moroso Racing	Ford	188	0	running	155	$25,765
6	24	2	Rusty Wallace	Penske Racing South	Pontiac	188	38	running	155	$28,490
7	5	28	Davey Allison	Robert Yates Racing	Ford	188	3	running	151	$27,710
8	15	98	Derrike Cope	Cale Yarborough Motorsports	Ford	188	0	running	142	$22,285
9	29	7	Jimmy Hensley	AK Racing	Ford	188	0	running	138	$24,285
10	13	30	Michael Waltrip	Bahari Racing	Pontiac	188	0	running	134	$19,585
11	30	24	Jeff Gordon (R)	Hendrick Motorsports	Chevrolet	188	0	running	130	$15,795
12	11	6	Mark Martin	Roush Racing	Ford	188	6	running	132	$21,715
13	19	1	Rick Mast	Precision Products Racing	Ford	188	0	running	124	$17,435
14	17	40	Kenny Wallace (R)	SABCO Racing	Pontiac	188	0	running	121	$11,655
15	9	21	Morgan Shepherd	Wood Brothers Racing	Ford	188	0	running	118	$16,975
16	4	44	Rick Wilson	Petty Enterprises	Pontiac	187	0	running	115	$13,285
17	41	90	Bobby Hillin Jr.	Donlavey Racing	Ford	187	0	running	112	$9,770
18	21	42	Kyle Petty	SABCO Racing	Pontiac	187	0	running	109	$18,030
19	39	41	Phil Parsons	Larry Hedrick Motorsports	Chevrolet	187	0	running	106	$11,840
20	25	27	Hut Stricklin	Junior Johnson & Associates	Ford	187	0	running	103	$14,880
21	8	25	Ken Schrader	Hendrick Motorsports	Chevrolet	187	0	running	100	$13,810
22	10	11	Bill Elliott	Junior Johnson & Associates	Ford	186	0	running	97	$18,890
23	37	33	Harry Gant	Leo Jackson Motorsports	Chevrolet	184	0	running	94	$17,580
24	14	8	Sterling Marlin	Stavola Brothers Racing	Ford	182	0	running	91	$13,375
25	34	53	Ritchie Petty	Petty Brothers Racing	Ford	182	0	running	88	$8,395
26	33	17	Darrell Waltrip	Darrell Waltrip Motorsports	Chevrolet	180	0	running	85	$18,115
27	31	15	Geoff Bodine	Bud Moore Engineering	Ford	174	0	handling	82	$16,260
28	23	55	Ted Musgrave	RaDiUs Motorsports	Ford	167	0	running	79	$13,055
29	7	16	Wally Dallenbach Jr.	Roush Racing	Ford	158	0	running	76	$12,900
30	12	26	Brett Bodine	King Racing	Ford	156	0	crash	73	$12,745
31	27	75	Dick Trickle	Butch Mock Motorsports	Ford	148	0	running	70	$7,965
32	28	52	Jimmy Means	Jimmy Means Racing	Ford	139	0	engine	67	$7,910
33	22	68	Greg Sacks	TriStar Motorsports	Ford	138	0	crash	64	$9,480
34	32	83	Lake Speed	Speed Racing	Ford	127	0	crash	61	$7,850
35	20	22	Bobby Labonte (R)	Bill Davis Racing	Ford	127	0	crash	58	$7,820
36	35	32	Jimmy Horton	Active Motorsports	Chevrolet	127	0	crash	55	$7,790
37	38	14	Terry Labonte	Hagan Racing	Chevrolet	126	0	crash	52	$13,285
38	36	45	Rich Bickle	Terminal Trucking Motorsports	Ford	74	0	shocks	49	$7,665
39	18	51	Jeff Purvis	Phoenix Racing	Chevrolet	32	0	engine	46	$7,600
40	40	85	Ken Bouchard	Mansion Motorsports	Ford	24	0	engine	43	$7,570
41	26	5	Ricky Rudd	Hendrick Motorsports	Chevrolet	12	0	camshaft	40	$12,120
Official race results

== Standings after the race ==
Drivers' Championship standings

	Pos	Driver	Points
	1	Rusty Wallace	1,452
	2	Dale Earnhardt	1,366 (-86)
	3	Davey Allison	1,290 (-162)
4	4	Dale Jarrett	1,209 (–243)
1	5	Kyle Petty	1,208 (–244)
	6	Mark Martin	1,191 (–261)
2	7	Geoff Bodine	1,172 (–280)
1	8	Morgan Shepherd	1,166 (–286)
5	9	Jimmy Spencer	1,107 (–345)
5	10	Ernie Irvan	1,100 (–352)
Official driver's standings

- Note: Only the first 10 positions are included for the driver standings.

Previous race: 1993 Hanes 500	NASCAR Winston Cup Series; 1993 season	Next race: 1993 Save Mart Supermarkets 300K
