= Calypso Lemonade 200 (Winchester) =

Former ARCA Menards Series race at Winchester Speedway

ARCA Menards Series
- Venue: Winchester Speedway
- Location: Winchester, Indiana, United States
- First race: 1982
- Last race: 2021
- Distance: 100 mi (160.934 km)
- Laps: 200
- Previous names: Winchester ARCA 100 (1982–1983); Winchester ARCA 125 (1988, 1990); Winchester ARCA 150 (1993–1994); Featherlite Trailers 150 (1995); Roger Holdeman Memorial 150 (1996–1997); Snap On 150 (1998); Winchester ARCA 200 (1999, 2007, 2017); Astral Carrier ARCA 250 (2000); ARCA Re/Max 250 (2001); Goldenpalace.com 200 (2002); Winchester ARCA Re/Max 200 (2003); ARCA 200 presented by Construct Corps (2006); Winchester ARCA 200 (1999); Winchester 200 presented by Federated Auto Parts (2011); Herr's Chase the Taste 200 (2012–2015); Herr's Potato Chips 200 (2016); Toyota 200 presented by Crosley Brands (2020); Calypso Lemonade 200 (2021)
- Most wins (driver): Frank Kimmel (6)
- Most wins (manufacturer): Ford (11)

Circuit information
- Surface: Asphalt
- Length: 0.50 mi (0.80 km)
- Turns: 4

The Calypso Lemonade 200 was an ARCA Menards Series race held at the Winchester Speedway in Winchester, Indiana. It was originally 50 miles, then increased to 63 miles, then 75, then 100, then 125, and then back down to 100.

== Past winners ==
=== ARCA Menards Series ===
Year	Date	Driver	Manufacturer	Race Distance		Race Time	Average Speed (mph)
Year	Date	Driver	Manufacturer	Laps	Miles (km)	Race Time	Average Speed (mph)
1982	July 5	Marvin Smith	Buick	100	50 (80.467)	N/A	N/A
1983	July 3	Marvin Smith	Buick	100	50 (80.467)	0:37:17	80.465
1984-1987	Not held						
1988	June 25	Tracy Leslie	Oldsmobile	125	62.50 (100.584)	0:45:23	82.569
1989	Not held						
1990	September 15	Bob Keselowski	Pontiac	125	62.50 (100.584)	0:41:34	90.217
1991->1992	Not held						
1993	October 3	Tim Steele	Oldsmobile	150	75 (120.701)	0:58:06	77.453
1994	October 1	Gary Bradberry	Buick	151*	75 (120.701)	1:15:19	60.146
1995	September 30	Tim Steele	Ford	150	75 (120.701)	1:10:23	63.936
1996	September 28	Frank Kimmel	Pontiac	150	75 (120.701)	1:01:24	73.29
1997	September 27	Tim Steele	Ford	153*	75 (120.701)	1:01:24	74.758
1998	September 26	Bob Strait	Ford	150	75 (120.701)	1:11:13	63.187
1999	August 29	Tracy Leslie	Ford	200	100 (160.934)	1:30:11	66.531
2000	August 12	Frank Kimmel	Chevrolet	250	125 (201.168)	2:18:11	54.275
2001	April 22	Tim Steele	Ford	250	125 (201.168)	2:09:46	59.621
2002	August 31	Frank Kimmel	Ford	200	100 (160.934)	1:39:34	60.261
2003	August 30	Frank Kimmel	Ford	203*	100 (160.934)	1:46:01	57.444
2004-2005	Not held						
2006	May 7	Frank Kimmel	Ford	202*	100 (160.934)	1:48:55	55.088
2007	May 6	Billy Leslie	Ford	200	100 (160.934)	1:35:36	62.76
2008-2010	Not held						
2011	June 25	Dakoda Armstrong	Dodge	200	100 (160.934)	1:17:08	77.782
2012	June 24	Alex Bowman	Dodge	200	100 (160.934)	1:13:41	81.427
2013	June 30	Frank Kimmel	Dodge	200	100 (160.934)	1:22:12	68.796
2014	July 6	Brandon Jones	Chevrolet	200	100 (160.934)	1:15:41	79.264
2015	June 28	Austin Wayne Self	Ford	200	100 (160.934)	1:35:27	62.862
2016	June 26	Chase Briscoe	Ford	200	100 (160.934)	1:16:45	78.16
2017	August 6	Kyle Benjamin	Toyota	200	100 (160.934)	1:13:41	77.822
2018-2019	Not held						
2020	September 19	Ty Gibbs	Toyota	200	100 (160.934)	1:26:22	69.471
2021	July 31	Ty Gibbs	Toyota	205*	100 (160.934)	1:28:35	69.426

- 1994, 1997, 2003, 2006, 2021: Race extended due to a Green–white–checker finish.
