= 1994 Miller Genuine Draft 400 (Michigan) =

14th race of the 1994 NASCAR Winston Cup Series

Race details
- Race 14 of 31 in the 1994 NASCAR Winston Cup Series
- The 1994 Miller Genuine Draft 400 program cover, featuring Rusty Wallace. Artwork by NASCAR artist Sam Bass.
- Date: June 19, 1994
- Official name: 26th Annual Miller Genuine Draft 400
- Location: Cambridge Township, Michigan, Michigan International Speedway
- Course: Permanent racing facility
- Course length: 2 miles (3.2 km)
- Distance: 200 laps, 400 mi (643.737 km)
- Scheduled distance: 200 laps, 400 mi (643.737 km)
- Average speed: 125.022 miles per hour (201.203 km/h)

Pole position
| Driver | Loy Allen Jr. | TriStar Motorsports |
- Time: 39.858

Most laps led
| Driver | Rusty Wallace | Penske Racing South |
- Laps: 83

Winner
| No. 18 | Rusty Wallace | Penske Racing South |

Television in the United States
- Network: CBS
- Announcers: Ken Squier, Ned Jarrett

Radio in the United States
- Radio: Motor Racing Network

The 1994 Miller Genuine Draft 400 was the 14th stock car race of the 1994 NASCAR Winston Cup Series season and the 26th iteration of the event. The race was held on Sunday, June 19, 1994, in Cambridge Township, Michigan, at Michigan International Speedway, a two-mile (3.2 km) moderate-banked D-shaped speedway. The race took the scheduled 200 laps to complete. In the final laps of the race, Penske Racing South driver Rusty Wallace would manage to come back from a slow pit stop, passing the leader with five to go in the race. Wallace would be able to hold onto the lead to take his 36th career NASCAR Winston Cup Series victory, his fifth victory of the season, and his third consecutive victory. To fill out the top three, Richard Childress Racing driver Dale Earnhardt and Roush Racing driver Mark Martin would finish second and third, respectively.

== Background ==
The layout of Michigan International Speedway, the venue where the race was held.

The race was held at Michigan International Speedway, a two-mile (3.2 km) moderate-banked D-shaped speedway located in Cambridge Township, Michigan. The track is used primarily for NASCAR events. It is known as a "sister track" to Texas World Speedway as MIS's oval design was a direct basis of TWS, with moderate modifications to the banking in the corners, and was used as the basis of Auto Club Speedway. The track is owned by International Speedway Corporation. Michigan International Speedway is recognized as one of motorsports' premier facilities because of its wide racing surface and high banking (by open-wheel standards; the 18-degree banking is modest by stock car standards).

=== Entry list ===
- (R) denotes rookie driver.

| # | Driver | Team | Make |
|---|---|---|---|
| 1 | Rick Mast | Precision Products Racing | Ford |
| 2 | Rusty Wallace | Penske Racing South | Ford |
| 02 | Jeremy Mayfield (R) | Taylor Racing | Ford |
| 3 | Dale Earnhardt | Richard Childress Racing | Chevrolet |
| 4 | Sterling Marlin | Morgan–McClure Motorsports | Chevrolet |
| 5 | Terry Labonte | Hendrick Motorsports | Chevrolet |
| 6 | Mark Martin | Roush Racing | Ford |
| 7 | Geoff Bodine | Geoff Bodine Racing | Ford |
| 07 | Robby Gordon | Kranefuss-Haas Racing | Ford |
| 8 | Jeff Burton (R) | Stavola Brothers Racing | Ford |
| 9 | Rich Bickle (R) | Melling Racing | Ford |
| 10 | Ricky Rudd | Rudd Performance Motorsports | Ford |
| 11 | Bill Elliott | Junior Johnson & Associates | Ford |
| 12 | Tim Steele | Bobby Allison Motorsports | Ford |
| 14 | John Andretti (R) | Hagan Racing | Chevrolet |
| 15 | Lake Speed | Bud Moore Engineering | Ford |
| 16 | Ted Musgrave | Roush Racing | Ford |
| 17 | Darrell Waltrip | Darrell Waltrip Motorsports | Chevrolet |
| 18 | Dale Jarrett | Joe Gibbs Racing | Chevrolet |
| 19 | Loy Allen Jr. (R) | TriStar Motorsports | Ford |
| 21 | Morgan Shepherd | Wood Brothers Racing | Ford |
| 22 | Bobby Labonte | Bill Davis Racing | Pontiac |
| 23 | Hut Stricklin | Travis Carter Enterprises | Ford |
| 24 | Jeff Gordon | Hendrick Motorsports | Chevrolet |
| 25 | Ken Schrader | Hendrick Motorsports | Chevrolet |
| 26 | Brett Bodine | King Racing | Ford |
| 27 | Jimmy Spencer | Junior Johnson & Associates | Ford |
| 28 | Ernie Irvan | Robert Yates Racing | Ford |
| 29 | Steve Grissom | Diamond Ridge Motorsports | Chevrolet |
| 30 | Michael Waltrip | Bahari Racing | Pontiac |
| 31 | Ward Burton | A.G. Dillard Motorsports | Chevrolet |
| 32 | Dick Trickle | Active Motorsports | Chevrolet |
| 33 | Harry Gant | Leo Jackson Motorsports | Chevrolet |
| 34 | Bob Brevak | Brevak Racing | Ford |
| 36 | H. B. Bailey | Bailey Racing | Pontiac |
| 40 | Bobby Hamilton | SABCO Racing | Pontiac |
| 41 | Joe Nemechek (R) | Larry Hedrick Motorsports | Chevrolet |
| 42 | Kyle Petty | SABCO Racing | Pontiac |
| 43 | Wally Dallenbach Jr. | Petty Enterprises | Pontiac |
| 44 | Bobby Hillin Jr. | Charles Hardy Racing | Ford |
| 47 | Billy Standridge | Johnson Standridge Racing | Ford |
| 51 | Jeff Purvis | Phoenix Racing | Chevrolet |
| 52 | Brad Teague | Jimmy Means Racing | Ford |
| 55 | Jimmy Hensley | RaDiUs Motorsports | Ford |
| 61 | Rick Carelli | Chesrown Racing | Chevrolet |
| 71 | Dave Marcis | Marcis Auto Racing | Chevrolet |
| 75 | Todd Bodine | Butch Mock Motorsports | Ford |
| 77 | Greg Sacks | U.S. Motorsports Inc. | Ford |
| 80 | Jimmy Horton | Hover Motorsports | Ford |
| 81 | Kenny Wallace | FILMAR Racing | Ford |
| 90 | Mike Wallace (R) | Donlavey Racing | Ford |
| 98 | Derrike Cope | Cale Yarborough Motorsports | Ford |

== Qualifying ==
Qualifying was split into two rounds. The first round was held on Friday, June 17, at 3:30 PM EST. Each driver would have one lap to set a time. During the first round, the top 20 drivers in the round would be guaranteed a starting spot in the race. If a driver was not able to guarantee a spot in the first round, they had the option to scrub their time from the first round and try and run a faster lap time in a second round qualifying run, held on Saturday, June 18, at 11:00 AM EST. As with the first round, each driver would have one lap to set a time. For this specific race, positions 21-40 would be decided on time, and depending on who needed it, a select amount of positions were given to cars who had not otherwise qualified but were high enough in owner's points; up to two provisionals were given. If needed, a past champion who did not qualify on either time or provisionals could use a champion's provisional, adding one more spot to the field.

Loy Allen Jr., driving for TriStar Motorsports, won the pole, setting a time of 39.858 and an average speed of 180.641 mph (290.714 km/h) in the first round.

Ten drivers would fail to qualify.

=== Full qualifying results ===
| Pos. | # | Driver | Team | Make | Time | Speed |
|---|---|---|---|---|---|---|
| 1 | 19 | Loy Allen Jr. (R) | TriStar Motorsports | Ford | 39.858 | 180.641 |
| 2 | 7 | Geoff Bodine | Geoff Bodine Racing | Ford | 40.078 | 179.650 |
| 3 | 11 | Bill Elliott | Junior Johnson & Associates | Ford | 40.087 | 179.609 |
| 4 | 5 | Terry Labonte | Hendrick Motorsports | Chevrolet | 40.090 | 179.596 |
| 5 | 2 | Rusty Wallace | Penske Racing South | Ford | 40.095 | 179.574 |
| 6 | 10 | Ricky Rudd | Rudd Performance Motorsports | Ford | 40.199 | 179.109 |
| 7 | 24 | Jeff Gordon | Hendrick Motorsports | Chevrolet | 40.221 | 179.011 |
| 8 | 6 | Mark Martin | Roush Racing | Ford | 40.257 | 178.851 |
| 9 | 77 | Greg Sacks | U.S. Motorsports Inc. | Ford | 40.381 | 178.302 |
| 10 | 26 | Brett Bodine | King Racing | Ford | 40.408 | 178.183 |
| 11 | 30 | Michael Waltrip | Bahari Racing | Pontiac | 40.416 | 178.147 |
| 12 | 21 | Morgan Shepherd | Wood Brothers Racing | Ford | 40.474 | 177.892 |
| 13 | 51 | Jeff Purvis | Phoenix Racing | Chevrolet | 40.487 | 177.835 |
| 14 | 98 | Derrike Cope | Cale Yarborough Motorsports | Ford | 40.533 | 177.633 |
| 15 | 31 | Ward Burton (R) | A.G. Dillard Motorsports | Chevrolet | 40.537 | 177.616 |
| 16 | 1 | Rick Mast | Precision Products Racing | Ford | 40.555 | 177.537 |
| 17 | 41 | Joe Nemechek (R) | Larry Hedrick Motorsports | Chevrolet | 40.578 | 177.436 |
| 18 | 02 | Jeremy Mayfield (R) | Taylor Racing | Ford | 40.602 | 177.331 |
| 19 | 55 | Jimmy Hensley | RaDiUs Motorsports | Ford | 40.622 | 177.244 |
| 20 | 4 | Sterling Marlin | Morgan–McClure Motorsports | Chevrolet | 40.647 | 177.135 |
Failed to lock in Round 1
| 21 | 27 | Jimmy Spencer | Junior Johnson & Associates | Ford | 40.462 | 177.945 |
| 22 | 81 | Kenny Wallace | FILMAR Racing | Ford | 40.534 | 177.629 |
| 23 | 28 | Ernie Irvan | Robert Yates Racing | Ford | 40.628 | 177.218 |
| 24 | 3 | Dale Earnhardt | Richard Childress Racing | Chevrolet | 40.644 | 177.148 |
| 25 | 9 | Rich Bickle (R) | Melling Racing | Ford | 40.670 | 177.035 |
| 26 | 44 | Bobby Hillin Jr. | Charles Hardy Racing | Ford | 40.687 | 176.961 |
| 27 | 29 | Steve Grissom (R) | Diamond Ridge Motorsports | Chevrolet | 40.688 | 176.956 |
| 28 | 15 | Lake Speed | Bud Moore Engineering | Ford | 40.710 | 176.861 |
| 29 | 12 | Tim Steele | Bobby Allison Motorsports | Ford | 40.718 | 176.826 |
| 30 | 22 | Bobby Labonte | Bill Davis Racing | Pontiac | 40.743 | 176.717 |
| 31 | 25 | Ken Schrader | Hendrick Motorsports | Chevrolet | 40.747 | 176.700 |
| 32 | 8 | Jeff Burton (R) | Stavola Brothers Racing | Ford | 40.768 | 176.609 |
| 33 | 14 | John Andretti (R) | Hagan Racing | Chevrolet | 40.772 | 176.592 |
| 34 | 17 | Darrell Waltrip | Darrell Waltrip Motorsports | Chevrolet | 40.777 | 176.570 |
| 35 | 18 | Dale Jarrett | Joe Gibbs Racing | Chevrolet | 40.810 | 176.427 |
| 36 | 75 | Todd Bodine | Butch Mock Motorsports | Ford | 40.810 | 176.427 |
| 37 | 33 | Harry Gant | Leo Jackson Motorsports | Chevrolet | 40.849 | 176.259 |
| 38 | 07 | Robby Gordon | Kranefuss-Haas Racing | Ford | 40.889 | 176.086 |
| 39 | 23 | Hut Stricklin | Travis Carter Enterprises | Ford | 40.934 | 175.893 |
| 40 | 16 | Ted Musgrave | Roush Racing | Ford | 41.072 | 175.302 |
Provisionals
| 41 | 42 | Kyle Petty | SABCO Racing | Pontiac | 41.437 | 173.758 |
| 42 | 40 | Bobby Hamilton | SABCO Racing | Pontiac | 41.114 | 175.123 |
Failed to qualify
| 43 | 71 | Dave Marcis | Marcis Auto Racing | Chevrolet | 41.086 | 175.242 |
| 44 | 43 | Wally Dallenbach Jr. | Petty Enterprises | Pontiac | 41.124 | 175.080 |
| 45 | 90 | Mike Wallace (R) | Donlavey Racing | Ford | 41.169 | 174.889 |
| 46 | 52 | Brad Teague | Jimmy Means Racing | Ford | 41.230 | 174.630 |
| 47 | 80 | Jimmy Horton | Hover Motorsports | Ford | 41.230 | 174.630 |
| 48 | 34 | Bob Brevak | Brevak Racing | Ford | 41.422 | 173.821 |
| 49 | 47 | Billy Standridge (R) | Johnson Standridge Racing | Ford | 41.527 | 173.381 |
| 50 | 32 | Dick Trickle | Active Motorsports | Chevrolet | 41.572 | 173.193 |
| 51 | 36 | H. B. Bailey | Bailey Racing | Pontiac | 41.848 | 172.051 |
| 52 | 61 | Rick Carelli | Chesrown Racing | Chevrolet | 42.381 | 169.887 |
Official first round qualifying results
Official starting lineup

== Race results ==
| Fin | St | # | Driver | Team | Make | Laps | Led | Status | Pts | Winnings |
|---|---|---|---|---|---|---|---|---|---|---|
| 1 | 5 | 2 | Rusty Wallace | Penske Racing South | Ford | 200 | 83 | running | 185 | $66,980 |
| 2 | 24 | 3 | Dale Earnhardt | Richard Childress Racing | Chevrolet | 200 | 18 | running | 175 | $55,905 |
| 3 | 8 | 6 | Mark Martin | Roush Racing | Ford | 200 | 3 | running | 170 | $42,330 |
| 4 | 6 | 10 | Ricky Rudd | Rudd Performance Motorsports | Ford | 200 | 0 | running | 160 | $31,430 |
| 5 | 12 | 21 | Morgan Shepherd | Wood Brothers Racing | Ford | 200 | 0 | running | 155 | $31,025 |
| 6 | 31 | 25 | Ken Schrader | Hendrick Motorsports | Chevrolet | 200 | 0 | running | 150 | $25,300 |
| 7 | 17 | 41 | Joe Nemechek (R) | Larry Hedrick Motorsports | Chevrolet | 200 | 0 | running | 146 | $20,450 |
| 8 | 11 | 30 | Michael Waltrip | Bahari Racing | Pontiac | 200 | 0 | running | 142 | $22,350 |
| 9 | 40 | 16 | Ted Musgrave | Roush Racing | Ford | 200 | 0 | running | 138 | $23,400 |
| 10 | 34 | 17 | Darrell Waltrip | Darrell Waltrip Motorsports | Chevrolet | 200 | 0 | running | 134 | $22,750 |
| 11 | 3 | 11 | Bill Elliott | Junior Johnson & Associates | Ford | 200 | 0 | running | 130 | $20,250 |
| 12 | 7 | 24 | Jeff Gordon | Hendrick Motorsports | Chevrolet | 200 | 62 | running | 132 | $22,175 |
| 13 | 16 | 1 | Rick Mast | Precision Products Racing | Ford | 199 | 0 | running | 124 | $18,725 |
| 14 | 35 | 18 | Dale Jarrett | Joe Gibbs Racing | Chevrolet | 199 | 0 | running | 121 | $22,675 |
| 15 | 30 | 22 | Bobby Labonte | Bill Davis Racing | Pontiac | 199 | 0 | running | 118 | $18,025 |
| 16 | 26 | 44 | Bobby Hillin Jr. | Charles Hardy Racing | Ford | 199 | 0 | running | 115 | $10,500 |
| 17 | 41 | 42 | Kyle Petty | SABCO Racing | Pontiac | 199 | 0 | running | 112 | $21,275 |
| 18 | 23 | 28 | Ernie Irvan | Robert Yates Racing | Ford | 199 | 9 | running | 114 | $22,640 |
| 19 | 22 | 81 | Kenny Wallace | FILMAR Racing | Ford | 198 | 0 | running | 106 | $9,825 |
| 20 | 4 | 5 | Terry Labonte | Hendrick Motorsports | Chevrolet | 197 | 18 | running | 108 | $20,610 |
| 21 | 32 | 8 | Jeff Burton (R) | Stavola Brothers Racing | Ford | 197 | 0 | running | 100 | $16,590 |
| 22 | 39 | 23 | Hut Stricklin | Travis Carter Enterprises | Ford | 197 | 0 | running | 97 | $11,875 |
| 23 | 21 | 27 | Jimmy Spencer | Junior Johnson & Associates | Ford | 197 | 0 | running | 94 | $12,165 |
| 24 | 1 | 19 | Loy Allen Jr. (R) | TriStar Motorsports | Ford | 197 | 7 | running | 96 | $14,055 |
| 25 | 18 | 02 | Jeremy Mayfield (R) | Taylor Racing | Ford | 197 | 0 | running | 88 | $8,945 |
| 26 | 27 | 29 | Steve Grissom (R) | Diamond Ridge Motorsports | Chevrolet | 196 | 0 | running | 85 | $11,185 |
| 27 | 13 | 51 | Jeff Purvis | Phoenix Racing | Chevrolet | 178 | 0 | transmission | 82 | $8,725 |
| 28 | 2 | 7 | Geoff Bodine | Geoff Bodine Racing | Ford | 178 | 0 | rear end | 79 | $15,965 |
| 29 | 15 | 31 | Ward Burton (R) | A.G. Dillard Motorsports | Chevrolet | 135 | 0 | engine | 76 | $8,555 |
| 30 | 25 | 9 | Rich Bickle (R) | Melling Racing | Ford | 134 | 0 | overheating | 73 | $8,490 |
| 31 | 36 | 75 | Todd Bodine | Butch Mock Motorsports | Ford | 131 | 0 | crash | 70 | $10,560 |
| 32 | 10 | 26 | Brett Bodine | King Racing | Ford | 122 | 0 | handling | 67 | $14,390 |
| 33 | 9 | 77 | Greg Sacks | U.S. Motorsports Inc. | Ford | 116 | 0 | crash | 64 | $10,210 |
| 34 | 20 | 4 | Sterling Marlin | Morgan–McClure Motorsports | Chevrolet | 110 | 0 | engine | 61 | $18,140 |
| 35 | 37 | 33 | Harry Gant | Leo Jackson Motorsports | Chevrolet | 98 | 0 | engine | 58 | $14,070 |
| 36 | 33 | 14 | John Andretti (R) | Hagan Racing | Chevrolet | 94 | 0 | overheating | 55 | $12,025 |
| 37 | 14 | 98 | Derrike Cope | Cale Yarborough Motorsports | Ford | 91 | 0 | handling | 52 | $9,490 |
| 38 | 38 | 07 | Robby Gordon | Kranefuss-Haas Racing | Ford | 69 | 0 | crash | 49 | $7,965 |
| 39 | 29 | 12 | Tim Steele | Bobby Allison Motorsports | Ford | 61 | 0 | crash | 46 | $11,940 |
| 40 | 28 | 15 | Lake Speed | Bud Moore Engineering | Ford | 44 | 0 | rocker arm | 43 | $17,880 |
| 41 | 42 | 40 | Bobby Hamilton | SABCO Racing | Pontiac | 18 | 0 | engine | 40 | $12,380 |
| 42 | 19 | 55 | Jimmy Hensley | RaDiUs Motorsports | Ford | 2 | 0 | engine | 37 | $7,880 |
Official race results

== Standings after the race ==
Drivers' Championship standings

| | Pos | Driver | Points |
|---|---|---|---|
| | 1 | Ernie Irvan | 2,244 |
| | 2 | Dale Earnhardt | 2,166 (-78) |
| | 3 | Rusty Wallace | 2,020 (-224) |
| 1 | 4 | Mark Martin | 1,931 (–313) |
| 1 | 5 | Ken Schrader | 1,925 (–319) |
| | 6 | Morgan Shepherd | 1,782 (–462) |
| | 7 | Ricky Rudd | 1,741 (–503) |
| | 8 | Michael Waltrip | 1,728 (–524) |
| 2 | 9 | Jeff Gordon | 1,668 (–576) |
| | 10 | Kyle Petty | 1,658 (–586) |
Official driver's standings

- Note: Only the first 10 positions are included for the driver standings.

| Previous race: 1994 UAW-GM Teamwork 500 | NASCAR Winston Cup Series; 1994 season | Next race: 1994 Pepsi 400 |
