= 1994 Miller Genuine Draft 500 =

17th race of the 1994 NASCAR Winston Cup Series

Race details
- Race 17 of 31 in the 1994 NASCAR Winston Cup Series
- The 1994 Miller Genuine Draft 500 program cover, featuring Rusty Wallace. Artwork by NASCAR artist Sam Bass.
- Date: July 17, 1994
- Official name: 22nd Annual Miller Genuine Draft 500
- Location: Long Pond, Pennsylvania, Pocono Raceway
- Course: Permanent racing facility
- Course length: 2.5 miles (4.0 km)
- Distance: 200 laps, 500 mi (804.672 km)
- Scheduled distance: 200 laps, 500 mi (804.672 km)
- Average speed: 136.075 miles per hour (218.991 km/h)

Pole position
Driver	Geoff Bodine	Geoff Bodine Racing
- Time: 54.922

Most laps led
Driver	Geoff Bodine	Geoff Bodine Racing
- Laps: 156

Winner
No. 7	Geoff Bodine	Geoff Bodine Racing

Television in the United States
- Network: TBS
- Announcers: Ken Squier, Barry Dodson

Radio in the United States
- Radio: Motor Racing Network

The 1994 Miller Genuine Draft 500 was the 17th stock car race of the 1994 NASCAR Winston Cup Series season and the 22nd iteration of the event. The race was held on Sunday, July 17, 1994, in Long Pond, Pennsylvania, at Pocono Raceway, a 2.5 miles (4.0 km) triangular permanent course. The race took the scheduled 200 laps to complete. At race's end, Geoff Bodine, driving for his own Geoff Bodine Racing team, would manage to dominate a majority of the race to take his 16th career NASCAR Winston Cup Series victory and his first victory of the season. To fill out the top three, A.G. Dillard Motorsports driver Ward Burton and Larry Hedrick Motorsports driver Joe Nemechek would finish second and third, respectively.

== Background ==
The layout of Pocono Raceway, the venue where the race was held.

The race was held at Pocono Raceway, which is a three-turn superspeedway located in Long Pond, Pennsylvania. Pocono Raceway is one of a very few NASCAR tracks not owned by either Speedway Motorsports or NASCAR. It is operated by the Igdalsky siblings Brandon, Nicholas, and sister Ashley, and cousins Joseph IV and Chase Mattioli, all of whom are third-generation members of the family-owned Mattco Inc, started by Joseph II and Rose Mattioli.

Outside of the NASCAR races, the track is used throughout the year by Sports Car Club of America (SCCA) and motorcycle clubs as well as racing schools and an IndyCar race. The triangular oval also has three separate infield sections of racetrack – North Course, East Course and South Course. Each of these infield sections use a separate portion of the tri-oval to complete the track. During regular non-race weekends, multiple clubs can use the track by running on different infield sections. Also some of the infield sections can be run in either direction, or multiple infield sections can be put together – such as running the North Course and the South Course and using the tri-oval to connect the two.

=== Entry list ===
- (R) denotes rookie driver.

#	Driver	Team	Make
1	Rick Mast	Precision Products Racing	Ford
2	Rusty Wallace	Penske Racing South	Ford
02	Derrike Cope	Taylor Racing	Ford
3	Dale Earnhardt	Richard Childress Racing	Chevrolet
4	Sterling Marlin	Morgan–McClure Motorsports	Chevrolet
5	Terry Labonte	Hendrick Motorsports	Chevrolet
6	Mark Martin	Roush Racing	Ford
7	Geoff Bodine	Geoff Bodine Racing	Ford
8	Jeff Burton (R)	Stavola Brothers Racing	Ford
9	Rich Bickle (R)	Melling Racing	Ford
10	Ricky Rudd	Rudd Performance Motorsports	Ford
11	Bill Elliott	Junior Johnson & Associates	Ford
12	Tim Steele	Bobby Allison Motorsports	Ford
14	John Andretti (R)	Hagan Racing	Chevrolet
15	Lake Speed	Bud Moore Engineering	Ford
16	Ted Musgrave	Roush Racing	Ford
17	Darrell Waltrip	Darrell Waltrip Motorsports	Chevrolet
18	Dale Jarrett	Joe Gibbs Racing	Chevrolet
19	Loy Allen Jr. (R)	TriStar Motorsports	Ford
21	Morgan Shepherd	Wood Brothers Racing	Ford
22	Bobby Labonte	Bill Davis Racing	Pontiac
23	Hut Stricklin	Travis Carter Enterprises	Ford
24	Jeff Gordon	Hendrick Motorsports	Chevrolet
25	Ken Schrader	Hendrick Motorsports	Chevrolet
26	Brett Bodine	King Racing	Ford
27	Jimmy Spencer	Junior Johnson & Associates	Ford
28	Ernie Irvan	Robert Yates Racing	Ford
29	Steve Grissom	Diamond Ridge Motorsports	Chevrolet
30	Michael Waltrip	Bahari Racing	Pontiac
31	Ward Burton	A.G. Dillard Motorsports	Chevrolet
32	Dick Trickle	Active Motorsports	Chevrolet
33	Harry Gant	Leo Jackson Motorsports	Chevrolet
40	Bobby Hamilton	SABCO Racing	Pontiac
41	Joe Nemechek (R)	Larry Hedrick Motorsports	Chevrolet
42	Kyle Petty	SABCO Racing	Pontiac
43	Wally Dallenbach Jr.	Petty Enterprises	Pontiac
47	Billy Standridge (R)	Johnson Standridge Racing	Ford
55	Jimmy Hensley	RaDiUs Motorsports	Ford
57	Bob Schacht	Balough Racing	Ford
65	Jerry O'Neil	O'Neil Racing	Chevrolet
71	Dave Marcis	Marcis Auto Racing	Chevrolet
75	Todd Bodine	Butch Mock Motorsports	Ford
77	Greg Sacks	U.S. Motorsports Inc.	Ford
90	Mike Wallace (R)	Donlavey Racing	Ford
98	Jeremy Mayfield (R)	Cale Yarborough Motorsports	Ford
99	Phil Parsons	J&J Racing	Oldsmobile

== Qualifying ==
Qualifying was split into two rounds. The first round was held on Friday, July 15, at 3:00 PM EST. Each driver would have one lap to set a time. During the first round, the top 20 drivers in the round would be guaranteed a starting spot in the race. If a driver was not able to guarantee a spot in the first round, they had the option to scrub their time from the first round and try and run a faster lap time in a second round qualifying run, held on Saturday, July 16, at 10:30 AM EST. As with the first round, each driver would have one lap to set a time. For this specific race, positions 21-40 would be decided on time, and depending on who needed it, a select amount of positions were given to cars who had not otherwise qualified but were high enough in owner's points; up to two provisionals were given. If needed, a past champion who did not qualify on either time or provisionals could use a champion's provisional, adding one more spot to the field.

Geoff Bodine, driving for his own Geoff Bodine Racing team, won the pole, setting a time of 54.922 and an average speed of 163.869 mph (263.722 km/h) in the first round.

Four drivers would fail to qualify.

=== Full qualifying results ===
Pos.	#	Driver	Team	Make	Time	Speed
1	7	Geoff Bodine	Geoff Bodine Racing	Ford	54.922	163.869
2	31	Ward Burton (R)	A.G. Dillard Motorsports	Chevrolet	55.118	163.286
3	77	Greg Sacks	U.S. Motorsports Inc.	Ford	55.274	162.825
4	8	Jeff Burton (R)	Stavola Brothers Racing	Ford	55.392	162.478
5	28	Ernie Irvan	Robert Yates Racing	Ford	55.395	162.470
6	10	Ricky Rudd	Rudd Performance Motorsports	Ford	55.440	162.338
7	24	Jeff Gordon	Hendrick Motorsports	Chevrolet	55.468	162.256
8	19	Loy Allen Jr. (R)	TriStar Motorsports	Ford	55.513	162.124
9	25	Ken Schrader	Hendrick Motorsports	Chevrolet	55.515	162.118
10	2	Rusty Wallace	Penske Racing South	Ford	55.519	162.107
11	41	Joe Nemechek (R)	Larry Hedrick Motorsports	Chevrolet	55.525	162.089
12	6	Mark Martin	Roush Racing	Ford	55.539	162.048
13	22	Bobby Labonte	Bill Davis Racing	Pontiac	55.575	161.943
14	26	Brett Bodine	King Racing	Ford	55.641	161.751
15	33	Harry Gant	Leo Jackson Motorsports	Chevrolet	55.663	161.687
16	40	Bobby Hamilton	SABCO Racing	Pontiac	55.682	161.632
17	18	Dale Jarrett	Joe Gibbs Racing	Chevrolet	55.690	161.609
18	4	Sterling Marlin	Morgan–McClure Motorsports	Chevrolet	55.699	161.583
19	11	Bill Elliott	Junior Johnson & Associates	Ford	55.768	161.383
20	3	Dale Earnhardt	Richard Childress Racing	Chevrolet	55.782	161.342
Failed to lock in Round 1
21	43	Wally Dallenbach Jr.	Petty Enterprises	Pontiac	55.794	161.308
22	47	Billy Standridge (R)	Johnson Standridge Racing	Ford	55.795	161.305
23	98	Jeremy Mayfield (R)	Cale Yarborough Motorsports	Ford	55.821	161.230
24	1	Rick Mast	Precision Products Racing	Ford	55.894	161.019
25	90	Mike Wallace (R)	Donlavey Racing	Ford	55.919	160.947
26	17	Darrell Waltrip	Darrell Waltrip Motorsports	Chevrolet	55.929	160.918
27	02	Derrike Cope	Taylor Racing	Ford	55.982	160.766
28	5	Terry Labonte	Hendrick Motorsports	Chevrolet	55.999	160.717
29	12	Tim Steele	Bobby Allison Motorsports	Ford	56.003	160.706
30	57	Bob Schacht	Balough Racing	Ford	56.105	160.414
31	75	Todd Bodine	Butch Mock Motorsports	Ford	56.130	160.342
32	16	Ted Musgrave	Roush Racing	Ford	56.181	160.197
33	21	Morgan Shepherd	Wood Brothers Racing	Ford	56.203	160.134
34	71	Dave Marcis	Marcis Auto Racing	Chevrolet	56.209	160.117
35	23	Hut Stricklin	Travis Carter Enterprises	Ford	56.249	160.003
36	14	John Andretti (R)	Hagan Racing	Chevrolet	56.262	159.966
37	42	Kyle Petty	SABCO Racing	Pontiac	56.286	159.898
38	9	Rich Bickle (R)	Melling Racing	Ford	56.348	159.722
39	29	Steve Grissom (R)	Diamond Ridge Motorsports	Chevrolet	56.389	159.606
40	15	Lake Speed	Bud Moore Engineering	Ford	56.396	159.586
Provisionals
41	30	Michael Waltrip	Bahari Racing	Pontiac	-*	-*
42	27	Jimmy Spencer	Junior Johnson & Associates	Ford	-*	-*
Failed to qualify
43	55	Jimmy Hensley	RaDiUs Motorsports	Ford	-*	-*
44	32	Dick Trickle	Active Motorsports	Chevrolet	-*	-*
45	99	Phil Parsons	J&J Racing	Oldsmobile	-*	-*
46	65	Jerry O'Neil	O'Neil Racing	Chevrolet	-*	-*
Official first round qualifying results
Official starting lineup

== Race results ==
Fin	St	#	Driver	Team	Make	Laps	Led	Status	Pts	Winnings
1	1	7	Geoff Bodine	Geoff Bodine Racing	Ford	200	156	running	185	$103,270
2	2	31	Ward Burton (R)	A.G. Dillard Motorsports	Chevrolet	200	6	running	175	$39,720
3	11	41	Joe Nemechek (R)	Larry Hedrick Motorsports	Chevrolet	200	0	running	165	$29,790
4	4	8	Jeff Burton (R)	Stavola Brothers Racing	Ford	200	16	running	165	$29,640
5	33	21	Morgan Shepherd	Wood Brothers Racing	Ford	200	0	running	155	$30,635
6	6	10	Ricky Rudd	Rudd Performance Motorsports	Ford	200	0	running	150	$17,260
7	20	3	Dale Earnhardt	Richard Childress Racing	Chevrolet	200	0	running	146	$26,210
8	7	24	Jeff Gordon	Hendrick Motorsports	Chevrolet	199	0	running	142	$21,760
9	10	2	Rusty Wallace	Penske Racing South	Ford	199	12	running	143	$24,460
10	17	18	Dale Jarrett	Joe Gibbs Racing	Chevrolet	199	0	running	134	$24,510
11	31	75	Todd Bodine	Butch Mock Motorsports	Ford	199	1	running	135	$13,710
12	18	4	Sterling Marlin	Morgan–McClure Motorsports	Chevrolet	199	0	running	127	$20,160
13	13	22	Bobby Labonte	Bill Davis Racing	Pontiac	199	0	running	124	$17,160
14	41	30	Michael Waltrip	Bahari Racing	Pontiac	198	0	running	121	$16,860
15	28	5	Terry Labonte	Hendrick Motorsports	Chevrolet	198	0	running	118	$19,910
16	21	43	Wally Dallenbach Jr.	Petty Enterprises	Pontiac	198	0	running	115	$19,360
17	19	11	Bill Elliott	Junior Johnson & Associates	Ford	198	0	running	112	$16,160
18	8	19	Loy Allen Jr. (R)	TriStar Motorsports	Ford	198	0	running	109	$9,260
19	27	02	Derrike Cope	Taylor Racing	Ford	198	0	running	106	$9,110
20	40	15	Lake Speed	Bud Moore Engineering	Ford	197	0	running	103	$19,365
21	23	98	Jeremy Mayfield (R)	Cale Yarborough Motorsports	Ford	197	0	running	100	$11,960
22	35	23	Hut Stricklin	Travis Carter Enterprises	Ford	197	0	running	97	$11,260
23	16	40	Bobby Hamilton	SABCO Racing	Pontiac	196	0	running	94	$15,060
24	42	27	Jimmy Spencer	Junior Johnson & Associates	Ford	196	0	running	91	$10,910
25	36	14	John Andretti (R)	Hagan Racing	Chevrolet	196	1	running	93	$12,460
26	34	71	Dave Marcis	Marcis Auto Racing	Chevrolet	196	0	running	85	$10,710
27	37	42	Kyle Petty	SABCO Racing	Pontiac	190	0	running	82	$19,360
28	26	17	Darrell Waltrip	Darrell Waltrip Motorsports	Chevrolet	189	0	running	79	$14,810
29	39	29	Steve Grissom (R)	Diamond Ridge Motorsports	Chevrolet	178	0	running	76	$10,360
30	25	90	Mike Wallace (R)	Donlavey Racing	Ford	176	0	running	73	$10,210
31	12	6	Mark Martin	Roush Racing	Ford	174	2	engine	75	$21,460
32	32	16	Ted Musgrave	Roush Racing	Ford	156	0	running	67	$14,110
33	29	12	Tim Steele	Bobby Allison Motorsports	Ford	153	0	running	64	$13,510
34	38	9	Rich Bickle (R)	Melling Racing	Ford	152	0	engine	61	$7,935
35	14	26	Brett Bodine	King Racing	Ford	145	0	transmission	58	$11,860
36	3	77	Greg Sacks	U.S. Motorsports Inc.	Ford	143	0	engine	55	$7,785
37	5	28	Ernie Irvan	Robert Yates Racing	Ford	136	1	timing chain	57	$19,310
38	15	33	Harry Gant	Leo Jackson Motorsports	Chevrolet	111	5	oil line	54	$12,670
39	9	25	Ken Schrader	Hendrick Motorsports	Chevrolet	105	0	overheating	46	$11,635
40	24	1	Rick Mast	Precision Products Racing	Ford	102	0	overheating	43	$12,060
41	22	47	Billy Standridge (R)	Johnson Standridge Racing	Ford	77	0	rear end	40	$7,560
42	30	57	Bob Schacht	Balough Racing	Ford	11	0	transmission	37	$7,560
Official race results

== Standings after the race ==
Drivers' Championship standings

	Pos	Driver	Points
	1	Dale Earnhardt	2,657
	2	Ernie Irvan	2,564 (-93)
	3	Rusty Wallace	2,413 (-244)
	4	Mark Martin	2,331 (–326)
1	5	Morgan Shepherd	2,225 (–432)
1	6	Ken Schrader	2,217 (–440)
	7	Ricky Rudd	2,188 (–469)
	8	Michael Waltrip	2,022 (–635)
1	9	Jeff Gordon	2,008 (–649)
1	10	Lake Speed	1,965 (–692)
Official driver's standings

- Note: Only the first 10 positions are included for the driver standings.

Previous race: 1994 Slick 50 300	NASCAR Winston Cup Series; 1994 season	Next race: 1994 DieHard 500
