= 1994 Pepsi 400 =

15th race of the 1994 NASCAR Winston Cup Series

Race details
- Race 15 of 31 in the 1994 NASCAR Winston Cup Series
- The 1994 Pepsi 400 program cover.
- Date: July 2, 1994
- Official name: 36th Annual Pepsi 400
- Location: Daytona Beach, Florida, Daytona International Speedway
- Course: Permanent racing facility
- Course length: 2.5 miles (4.0 km)
- Distance: 160 laps, 400 mi (643.737 km)
- Scheduled distance: 160 laps, 400 mi (643.737 km)
- Average speed: 155.558 miles per hour (250.346 km/h)
- Attendance: 100,000

Pole position
Driver	Dale Earnhardt	Richard Childress Racing
- Time: 47.037

Most laps led
Driver	Ernie Irvan	Robert Yates Racing
- Laps: 86

Winner
No. 27	Jimmy Spencer	Junior Johnson & Associates

Television in the United States
- Network: ESPN
- Announcers: Bob Jenkins, Benny Parsons, Ned Jarrett

Radio in the United States
- Radio: Motor Racing Network

The 1994 Pepsi 400 was the 15th stock car race of the 1994 NASCAR Winston Cup Series season and the 36th iteration of the event. The race was held on Saturday, July 2, 1994, in Daytona Beach, Florida at Daytona International Speedway, a 2.5 miles (4.0 km) permanent triangular-shaped superspeedway. The race took the scheduled 160 laps to complete. In a last-lap battle to the finish, Junior Johnson & Associates driver Jimmy Spencer would manage to best out Robert Yates Racing driver Ernie Irvan in one of the closest NASCAR Winston Cup Series finishes in history, besting Irvan by eight one-thousandths of a second. The win was Spencer's first career NASCAR Winston Cup Series victory and his first victory of the season. To fill out the top three, Richard Childress Racing driver Dale Earnhardt would finish third.

== Background ==
The layout of Daytona International Speedway, the venue where the race was held.

Daytona International Speedway is one of three superspeedways to hold NASCAR races, the other two being Indianapolis Motor Speedway and Talladega Superspeedway. The standard track at Daytona International Speedway is a four-turn superspeedway that is 2.5 miles (4.0 km) long. The track's turns are banked at 31 degrees, while the front stretch, the location of the finish line, is banked at 18 degrees.

=== Entry list ===
- (R) denotes rookie driver.

#	Driver	Team	Make
0	Delma Cowart	H. L. Waters Racing	Ford
1	Rick Mast	Precision Products Racing	Ford
2	Rusty Wallace	Penske Racing South	Ford
02	Jeremy Mayfield (R)	Taylor Racing	Ford
3	Dale Earnhardt	Richard Childress Racing	Chevrolet
4	Sterling Marlin	Morgan–McClure Motorsports	Chevrolet
5	Terry Labonte	Hendrick Motorsports	Chevrolet
6	Mark Martin	Roush Racing	Ford
7	Geoff Bodine	Geoff Bodine Racing	Ford
8	Jeff Burton (R)	Stavola Brothers Racing	Ford
9	Rich Bickle (R)	Melling Racing	Ford
10	Ricky Rudd	Rudd Performance Motorsports	Ford
11	Bill Elliott	Junior Johnson & Associates	Ford
12	Tim Steele	Bobby Allison Motorsports	Ford
14	John Andretti (R)	Hagan Racing	Chevrolet
15	Lake Speed	Bud Moore Engineering	Ford
16	Ted Musgrave	Roush Racing	Ford
17	Darrell Waltrip	Darrell Waltrip Motorsports	Chevrolet
18	Dale Jarrett	Joe Gibbs Racing	Chevrolet
19	Loy Allen Jr. (R)	TriStar Motorsports	Ford
20	Bobby Hillin Jr.	Moroso Racing	Ford
21	Morgan Shepherd	Wood Brothers Racing	Ford
22	Bobby Labonte	Bill Davis Racing	Pontiac
23	Hut Stricklin	Travis Carter Enterprises	Ford
24	Jeff Gordon	Hendrick Motorsports	Chevrolet
25	Ken Schrader	Hendrick Motorsports	Chevrolet
26	Brett Bodine	King Racing	Ford
27	Jimmy Spencer	Junior Johnson & Associates	Ford
28	Ernie Irvan	Robert Yates Racing	Ford
29	Steve Grissom	Diamond Ridge Motorsports	Chevrolet
30	Michael Waltrip	Bahari Racing	Pontiac
31	Ward Burton	A.G. Dillard Motorsports	Chevrolet
32	Dick Trickle	Active Motorsports	Chevrolet
33	Harry Gant	Leo Jackson Motorsports	Chevrolet
40	Bobby Hamilton	SABCO Racing	Pontiac
41	Joe Nemechek (R)	Larry Hedrick Motorsports	Chevrolet
42	Kyle Petty	SABCO Racing	Pontiac
43	Wally Dallenbach Jr.	Petty Enterprises	Pontiac
47	Billy Standridge	Johnson Standridge Racing	Ford
51	Jeff Purvis	Phoenix Racing	Chevrolet
52	Brad Teague	Jimmy Means Racing	Ford
53	Ritchie Petty	Petty Brothers Racing	Ford
55	Jimmy Hensley	RaDiUs Motorsports	Ford
71	Dave Marcis	Marcis Auto Racing	Chevrolet
75	Todd Bodine	Butch Mock Motorsports	Ford
77	Greg Sacks	U.S. Motorsports Inc.	Ford
80	Joe Ruttman	Hover Motorsports	Ford
90	Mike Wallace (R)	Donlavey Racing	Ford
98	Derrike Cope	Cale Yarborough Motorsports	Ford

== Qualifying ==
Qualifying was split into two rounds. The first round was held on Thursday, June 30, at 2:30 PM EST. Each driver would have one lap to set a time. During the first round, the top 20 drivers in the round would be guaranteed a starting spot in the race. If a driver was not able to guarantee a spot in the first round, they had the option to scrub their time from the first round and try and run a faster lap time in a second round qualifying run, held on Friday, July 1, at 1:00 PM EST. As with the first round, each driver would have one lap to set a time. For this specific race, positions 21-40 would be decided on time, and depending on who needed it, a select amount of positions were given to cars who had not otherwise qualified but were high enough in owner's points; up to two provisionals were given. If needed, a past champion who did not qualify on either time or provisionals could use a champion's provisional, adding one more spot to the field.

Dale Earnhardt, driving for Richard Childress Racing, won the pole, setting a time of 47.037 and an average speed of 191.339 mph (307.930 km/h) in the first round.

Six drivers would fail to qualify.

=== Full qualifying results ===
Pos.	#	Driver	Team	Make	Time	Speed
1	3	Dale Earnhardt	Richard Childress Racing	Chevrolet	47.037	191.339
2	19	Loy Allen Jr. (R)	TriStar Motorsports	Ford	47.153	190.868
3	27	Jimmy Spencer	Junior Johnson & Associates	Ford	47.225	190.577
4	4	Sterling Marlin	Morgan–McClure Motorsports	Chevrolet	47.452	189.665
5	28	Ernie Irvan	Robert Yates Racing	Ford	47.499	189.478
6	25	Ken Schrader	Hendrick Motorsports	Chevrolet	47.662	188.830
7	7	Geoff Bodine	Geoff Bodine Racing	Ford	47.662	188.830
8	77	Greg Sacks	U.S. Motorsports Inc.	Ford	47.680	188.758
9	5	Terry Labonte	Hendrick Motorsports	Chevrolet	47.690	188.719
10	55	Jimmy Hensley	RaDiUs Motorsports	Ford	47.773	188.391
11	18	Dale Jarrett	Joe Gibbs Racing	Chevrolet	47.775	188.383
12	24	Jeff Gordon	Hendrick Motorsports	Chevrolet	47.783	188.352
13	2	Rusty Wallace	Penske Racing South	Ford	47.928	187.782
14	22	Bobby Labonte	Bill Davis Racing	Pontiac	47.935	187.754
15	6	Mark Martin	Roush Racing	Ford	47.940	187.735
16	16	Ted Musgrave	Roush Racing	Ford	47.982	187.570
17	75	Todd Bodine	Butch Mock Motorsports	Ford	48.000	187.500
18	90	Mike Wallace (R)	Donlavey Racing	Ford	48.023	187.410
19	51	Jeff Purvis	Phoenix Racing	Chevrolet	48.039	187.348
20	23	Hut Stricklin	Travis Carter Enterprises	Ford	48.077	187.200
Failed to lock in Round 1
21	29	Steve Grissom (R)	Diamond Ridge Motorsports	Chevrolet	48.077	187.200
22	26	Brett Bodine	King Racing	Ford	48.127	187.005
23	30	Michael Waltrip	Bahari Racing	Pontiac	48.158	186.885
24	21	Morgan Shepherd	Wood Brothers Racing	Ford	48.176	186.815
25	32	Dick Trickle	Active Motorsports	Chevrolet	48.179	186.803
26	33	Harry Gant	Leo Jackson Motorsports	Chevrolet	48.184	186.784
27	8	Jeff Burton (R)	Stavola Brothers Racing	Ford	48.211	186.679
28	14	John Andretti (R)	Hagan Racing	Chevrolet	48.237	186.579
29	12	Tim Steele	Bobby Allison Motorsports	Ford	48.245	186.548
30	02	Jeremy Mayfield (R)	Taylor Racing	Ford	48.255	186.509
31	10	Ricky Rudd	Rudd Performance Motorsports	Ford	48.306	186.312
32	71	Dave Marcis	Marcis Auto Racing	Chevrolet	48.314	186.281
33	15	Lake Speed	Bud Moore Engineering	Ford	48.315	186.278
34	9	Rich Bickle (R)	Melling Racing	Ford	48.318	186.266
35	53	Ritchie Petty	Petty Brothers Racing	Ford	48.353	186.131
36	42	Kyle Petty	SABCO Racing	Pontiac	48.361	186.100
37	17	Darrell Waltrip	Darrell Waltrip Motorsports	Chevrolet	48.399	185.954
38	41	Joe Nemechek (R)	Larry Hedrick Motorsports	Chevrolet	48.405	185.931
39	98	Derrike Cope	Cale Yarborough Motorsports	Ford	48.468	185.690
40	31	Ward Burton (R)	A.G. Dillard Motorsports	Chevrolet	48.480	185.644
Provisionals
41	1	Rick Mast	Precision Products Racing	Ford	49.249	182.745
42	40	Bobby Hamilton	SABCO Racing	Pontiac	48.535	185.433
Champion's Provisional
43	11	Bill Elliott	Junior Johnson & Associates	Ford	48.759	184.581
Failed to qualify
44	52	Brad Teague	Jimmy Means Racing	Ford	-*	-*
45	20	Bobby Hillin Jr.	Moroso Racing	Ford	-*	-*
46	80	Joe Ruttman	Hover Motorsports	Ford	-*	-*
47	43	Wally Dallenbach Jr.	Petty Enterprises	Pontiac	-*	-*
48	47	Billy Standridge	Johnson Standridge Racing	Ford	-*	-*
49	0	Delma Cowart	H. L. Waters Racing	Ford	-*	-*
Official first round qualifying results
Official starting lineup

== Race results ==
Fin	St	#	Driver	Team	Make	Laps	Led	Status	Pts	Winnings
1	3	27	Jimmy Spencer	Junior Johnson & Associates	Ford	160	1	running	180	$75,880
2	5	28	Ernie Irvan	Robert Yates Racing	Ford	160	86	running	180	$50,275
3	1	3	Dale Earnhardt	Richard Childress Racing	Chevrolet	160	31	running	170	$50,050
4	15	6	Mark Martin	Roush Racing	Ford	160	3	running	165	$36,575
5	6	25	Ken Schrader	Hendrick Motorsports	Chevrolet	160	0	running	155	$30,150
6	7	7	Geoff Bodine	Geoff Bodine Racing	Ford	160	9	running	155	$25,875
7	17	75	Todd Bodine	Butch Mock Motorsports	Ford	160	0	running	146	$19,675
8	12	24	Jeff Gordon	Hendrick Motorsports	Chevrolet	160	19	running	147	$25,175
9	24	21	Morgan Shepherd	Wood Brothers Racing	Ford	160	0	running	138	$24,275
10	33	15	Lake Speed	Bud Moore Engineering	Ford	160	0	running	134	$25,825
11	11	18	Dale Jarrett	Joe Gibbs Racing	Chevrolet	160	0	running	130	$24,265
12	18	90	Mike Wallace (R)	Donlavey Racing	Ford	160	0	running	127	$16,570
13	23	30	Michael Waltrip	Bahari Racing	Pontiac	160	0	running	124	$19,180
14	16	16	Ted Musgrave	Roush Racing	Ford	160	0	running	121	$18,840
15	9	5	Terry Labonte	Hendrick Motorsports	Chevrolet	160	0	running	118	$21,850
16	22	26	Brett Bodine	King Racing	Ford	160	0	running	115	$18,310
17	31	10	Ricky Rudd	Rudd Performance Motorsports	Ford	160	3	running	117	$13,985
18	27	8	Jeff Burton (R)	Stavola Brothers Racing	Ford	160	0	running	109	$18,080
19	43	11	Bill Elliott	Junior Johnson & Associates	Ford	160	0	running	106	$19,240
20	34	9	Rich Bickle (R)	Melling Racing	Ford	160	0	running	103	$11,025
21	25	32	Dick Trickle	Active Motorsports	Chevrolet	159	0	running	100	$12,655
22	14	22	Bobby Labonte	Bill Davis Racing	Pontiac	159	0	running	97	$16,435
23	39	98	Derrike Cope	Cale Yarborough Motorsports	Ford	159	0	running	94	$12,165
24	42	40	Bobby Hamilton	SABCO Racing	Pontiac	159	0	running	91	$15,945
25	37	17	Darrell Waltrip	Darrell Waltrip Motorsports	Chevrolet	159	0	running	88	$15,725
26	13	2	Rusty Wallace	Penske Racing South	Ford	159	0	running	85	$21,655
27	32	71	Dave Marcis	Marcis Auto Racing	Chevrolet	158	0	running	82	$11,310
28	4	4	Sterling Marlin	Morgan–McClure Motorsports	Chevrolet	158	6	running	84	$20,190
29	41	1	Rick Mast	Precision Products Racing	Ford	158	0	running	76	$15,095
30	30	02	Jeremy Mayfield (R)	Taylor Racing	Ford	158	0	running	73	$9,500
31	26	33	Harry Gant	Leo Jackson Motorsports	Chevrolet	158	0	running	70	$14,445
32	10	55	Jimmy Hensley	RaDiUs Motorsports	Ford	157	0	running	67	$8,915
33	21	29	Steve Grissom (R)	Diamond Ridge Motorsports	Chevrolet	157	0	running	64	$8,885
34	36	42	Kyle Petty	SABCO Racing	Pontiac	156	0	running	61	$19,855
35	28	14	John Andretti (R)	Hagan Racing	Chevrolet	154	0	running	58	$12,825
36	40	31	Ward Burton (R)	A.G. Dillard Motorsports	Chevrolet	151	0	running	55	$8,795
37	8	77	Greg Sacks	U.S. Motorsports Inc.	Ford	145	1	running	57	$8,766
38	19	51	Jeff Purvis	Phoenix Racing	Chevrolet	118	0	crash	49	$8,750
39	38	41	Joe Nemechek (R)	Larry Hedrick Motorsports	Chevrolet	118	0	crash	46	$8,745
40	2	19	Loy Allen Jr. (R)	TriStar Motorsports	Ford	101	1	engine	48	$8,705
41	35	53	Ritchie Petty	Petty Brothers Racing	Ford	73	0	overheating	40	$8,705
42	20	23	Hut Stricklin	Travis Carter Enterprises	Ford	46	0	engine	37	$8,705
43	29	12	Tim Steele	Bobby Allison Motorsports	Ford	20	0	vibration	34	$12,705
Official race results

== Standings after the race ==
Drivers' Championship standings

	Pos	Driver	Points
	1	Ernie Irvan	2,424
	2	Dale Earnhardt	2,336 (-88)
	3	Rusty Wallace	2,105 (-319)
	4	Mark Martin	2,096 (–328)
	5	Ken Schrader	2,085 (–344)
	6	Morgan Shepherd	1,920 (–504)
	7	Ricky Rudd	1,858 (–566)
	8	Michael Waltrip	1,844 (–580)
	9	Jeff Gordon	1,814 (–609)
2	10	Lake Speed	1,744 (–680)
Official driver's standings

- Note: Only the first 10 positions are included for the driver standings.

Previous race: 1994 Miller Genuine Draft 400 (Michigan)	NASCAR Winston Cup Series; 1994 season	Next race: 1994 Slick 50 300
