= Ritchie Petty =

American racing driver

- Born: June 20, 1968 (age 58); Randleman, North Carolina, U.S.

NASCAR Cup Series career
- 4 races run over 2 years
- Best finish: 53rd (1993)
- First race: 1993 Winston 500 (Talladega)
- Last race: 1994 Pepsi 400 (Daytona)
| Wins | Top tens | Poles |
|---|---|---|
| 0 | 0 | 0 |

NASCAR FedEx Freight Truck Series career
- 1 race run over 1 year
- Best finish: 102nd (1996)
- First race: 1996 Florida Dodge Dealers 400 (Homestead)
| Wins | Top tens | Poles |
|---|---|---|
| 0 | 0 | 0 |

Ritchie Petty (born June 20, 1968) is an American stock car racing driver. Son of Maurice Petty and nephew of Richard Petty, he competed in the NASCAR Cup Series in the No. 53 Ford owned by his father. His best career Cup finish was a 25th at Talladega.

== Motorsports career results ==
=== NASCAR ===
(key) (Bold - Pole position awarded by qualifying time. Italics - Pole position earned by points standings or practice time. * – Most laps led.)

==== Winston Cup Series ====
NASCAR Winston Cup Series results
| Year | Team | No. | Make | 1 | 2 | 3 | 4 | 5 | 6 | 7 | 8 | 9 | 10 | 11 | 12 | 13 | 14 | 15 | 16 | 17 | 18 | 19 | 20 | 21 | 22 | 23 | 24 | 25 | 26 | 27 | 28 | 29 | 30 | 31 | NWCC | Pts | Ref |
|---|---|---|---|---|---|---|---|---|---|---|---|---|---|---|---|---|---|---|---|---|---|---|---|---|---|---|---|---|---|---|---|---|---|---|---|---|---|
| 1993 | Petty Brothers Racing | 53 | Ford | DAY | CAR | RCH | ATL | DAR | BRI | NWS | MAR | TAL; 25 | SON | CLT | DOV | POC | MCH | DAY; 32 | NHA | POC | TAL; 41 | GLN | MCH; DNQ | BRI | DAR | RCH; DNQ | DOV | MAR | NWS | CLT | CAR | PHO | ATL | | 53rd | 195 | |
| 1994 | Petty Brothers Racing | 53 | Ford | DAY; DNQ | CAR | RCH | ATL | DAR | BRI | NWS | MAR | TAL; DNQ | SON | CLT | DOV | POC | MCH | DAY; 41 | NHA | POC | TAL; DNQ | IND | GLN | MCH | BRI | DAR | RCH | DOV | MAR | NWS | CLT | CAR | PHO | ATL | 81st | 40 | |
| 1995 | Petty Brothers Racing | 53 | Ford | DAY; DNQ | CAR | RCH | ATL | DAR | BRI | NWS | MAR | TAL; DNQ | SON | CLT | DOV | POC | MCH | DAY | NHA | POC | TAL | IND | GLN | MCH | BRI | DAR | RCH | DOV | MAR | NWS | CLT | CAR | PHO | ATL | NA | - | |

===== Daytona 500 results =====
| Year | Team | Manufacturer | Start | Finish |
|---|---|---|---|---|
| 1994 | Petty Brothers Racing | Ford | DNQ | |
| 1995 | Petty Brothers Racing | Ford | DNQ | |

==== Craftsman Truck Series ====
NASCAR Craftsman Truck Series results
| Year | Team | No. | Make | 1 | 2 | 3 | 4 | 5 | 6 | 7 | 8 | 9 | 10 | 11 | 12 | 13 | 14 | 15 | 16 | 17 | 18 | 19 | 20 | 21 | 22 | 23 | 24 | NCTC | Pts | Ref |
|---|---|---|---|---|---|---|---|---|---|---|---|---|---|---|---|---|---|---|---|---|---|---|---|---|---|---|---|---|---|---|
| 1996 | Rosenblum Racing | 51 | Chevy | HOM; 17 | PHO | POR | EVG | TUS | CNS | HPT | BRI | NZH | MLW | LVL | I70 | IRP | FLM | GLN | NSV | RCH | NHA | MAR | NWS | SON | MMR | PHO | LVS | 102nd | 112 | |
