= 1995 Daytona 500 =

Auto race held at Daytona International Speedway in 1995

Race details
- Race 1 of 31 in the 1995 NASCAR Winston Cup Series season
- 1995 Daytona 500 program cover
- Date: February 19, 1995
- Location: Daytona International Speedway, Daytona Beach, Florida
- Course: Permanent racing facility 2.5 mi (4.02336 km)
- Distance: 200 laps, 500 mi (804.672 km)
- Weather: Temperatures reaching as high as 66.9 °F (19.4 °C); wind speeds approaching 12 miles per hour (19 km/h)
- Average speed: 141.710 miles per hour (228.060 km/h)

Pole position
Driver	Dale Jarrett	Robert Yates Racing

Qualifying race winners
Duel 1 Winner	Sterling Marlin	Morgan-McClure Motorsports
Duel 2 Winner	Dale Earnhardt	Richard Childress Racing

Most laps led
Driver	Sterling Marlin	Morgan-McClure Motorsports
- Laps: 105

Winner
No. 4	Sterling Marlin	Morgan-McClure Motorsports

Television in the United States
- Network: CBS
- Announcers: Ken Squier, Richard Petty and Ned Jarrett
- Nielsen ratings: 7.8/20 (11.4 million viewers)

Logo for the 1995 Daytona 500.

The 1995 Daytona 500, the 37th running of the event, was held on February 19 at Daytona International Speedway in Daytona Beach, Florida. Dale Jarrett won his first career Winston Cup pole. Sterling Marlin won the race for the second straight year, his second Daytona 500 win, after leading 105 laps, including the final 20.

== Race summary ==
=== Opening laps ===
Outside polesitter Dale Earnhardt led the opening lap for the first time in his Daytona 500 career. Lap 3 saw Sterling Marlin in the Morgan–McClure Motorsports No. 4 car take the lead. The first yellow flag came out on lap 9 when Joe Nemechek (in his first race for his own team) crashed and collected Brett Bodine. Two laps after the restart, IMSA and IndyCar veteran Davy Jones touched with fellow rookie Randy LaJoie exiting turn 4, clipping the wall and spinning the Jasper Motorsports No. 77 car into the pits. Before 30 laps were put on the board, sprint car king Steve Kinser crashed with Phil Parsons. Jeff Gordon took the lead from Marlin during the yellow flag pit stops. After the restart, Mark Martin and 1985 and 1987 winner Bill Elliott stopped for flat tires. On lap 43, John Andretti and 1990 winner Derrike Cope collided exiting turn 2. Both drivers continued with minimal damage, but as Cope came through the tri-oval to catch up to the field, both rear tires suddenly blew out, sending him into a harmless spin but rendering his car disabled as he could get no traction with both rear tires flat. On lap 58, Mike Wallace got loose in turn 2 and tagged Jeff Purvis, sending both cars into the wall and the 1994 and 1993 ARCA 200 winners respectively were finished for the day. Caution flag pit stops resulted in Dave Marcis staying out to lead one lap (a regular practice for Dave), and Mark Martin's Roush Racing crew placed his car in front. On lap 68, Gordon retook the lead.

=== Mid-race events ===
On lap 70, rain interrupted the race for 2 hours. Jeff Gordon led Marlin, Todd Bodine, Earnhardt and Ken Schrader when the red flag was withdrawn. On lap 97, Todd Bodine spun exiting turn 4 (whether or not contact with Robert Pressley caused it was unclear), and engine failure soon took him out after the restart. He joined Purvis, Mike Wallace, Kinser Parsons, and Nemechek as the 6 cars out of the race. During the pit stops, Gordon dropped from the lead to 20th after a very long pit stop. Earnhardt was the new leader, and at halfway he led Michael Waltrip, Morgan Shepherd, Marlin and Ken Schrader to the restart. With help from Marlin, the younger Waltrip took the lead from Earnhardt for 2 laps before the defending 500 winner retook the lead. Meanwhile, Gordon was reclaiming lost ground quickly and passed Michael Waltrip in turn 2 on lap 109 to re-enter the top 10.

On lap 131, Dave Marcis hit the turn 3 wall and slowed to a stop in the middle of turns 3 and 4. After the restart, a small dispute developed in his pits centering on the status of his unused tires. The Penske team showed up to make an offer for the tires, but Marcis wanted the tires to go to Richard Childress Racing and Earnhardt, for whom Marcis and his team had done many miles of testing and from whom he had received an engine for the race. "I may not have been in the Daytona 500 if it wasn't for Richard Childress," said Marcis of the former owner-driver.

Going through all of this, Marlin retained the lead until, with 40 laps to go, rookie Randy LaJoie spun on the backstretch and lost his windshield. As the yellow flag was being waved, Bobby Hamilton made contact with Rusty Wallace, resulting in Wallace's fifth straight Daytona 500 crash (4 of which resulted in a DNF, with the 1992 running as the exception). Rick Mast led a lap during the caution. 1989 winner Darrell Waltrip had a transmission failure that would cost him 20 laps to repair. Meanwhile, Gordon suffered an aerodynamic setback that would cost him the race. The jack was let down too soon on the driver's side during the tire change, and the fender was bent by the left front tire. Earnhardt would lead the field to the restart, and afterward, Gordon would brush the wall in his now ill-handling car. He brought the Hendrick Motorsports No. 24 car in for a correctional pit stop and lost a lap.

=== Finish ===
With 20 laps to go, Marlin passed Earnhardt for the lead on the back straightaway. With 15 laps to go, Bobby Labonte (in his first race for Joe Gibbs Racing) crashed in turn 1, nearly collecting his older brother Terry. Earnhardt came in for 4 new tires, gambling that maneuverability would be more valuable than track position. Just before the restart, rookie Robert Pressley spun in the short chute before turn 1 after contact from Dick Trickle. When the green was waved Earnhardt quickly re-entered the top 10, and with 10 to go, he was side by side with Ricky Rudd for 9th. He passed Mark Martin for the second position with 4 laps to go, but Sterling Marlin's Chevrolet was not to be denied. This was Sterling Marlin's second Winston Cup win, both of which were in the Daytona 500. Marlin also joined Richard Petty (in the 1974 race) and Cale Yarborough (in 1984 race) as the only drivers who have won back-to-back Daytona 500's; this feat was not repeated until the 2020 race when Denny Hamlin joined the ranks of back-to-back winners and then again with William Byron in 2024 – 2025. Martin went to third while his teammate Ted Musgrave finished fourth and 1993 winner Dale Jarrett (who started on the Pole) finished 5th.

This was Richard Petty's only Daytona 500 as a broadcaster, and the first Daytona 500 to be broadcast with a reduction in availability. As a result of the Fox affiliate switches of 1994, many markets where CBS lost major affiliates and were relegated to minor affiliates could not receive the race, including three markets where a NASCAR-sanctioned national series races were held -- Atlanta, Milwaukee, and Detroit. The Atlanta market losses affected North Georgia, where Bill Elliott is based, as mountainous areas of northern Georgia could not receive the race because WGCL had a much weaker signal than the station that defected (WAGA). That situation was resolved in 1996 when WSPA in Spartanburg launched WNEG as a CBS affiliate in September 1995.

== Results ==
Pos	Grid	No.	Driver	Team	Manufacturer	Laps	Status	Laps led	Points
1	3	4	Sterling Marlin (W)	Morgan–McClure Motorsports	Chevrolet	200	Running	105	185
2	2	3	Dale Earnhardt	Richard Childress Racing	Chevrolet	200	Running	23	175
3	6	6	Mark Martin	Roush Racing	Ford	200	Running	7	170
4	12	16	Ted Musgrave	Roush Racing	Ford	200	Running	0	160
5	1	28	Dale Jarrett (W)	Robert Yates Racing	Ford	200	Running	0	155
6	15	30	Michael Waltrip	Bahari Racing	Pontiac	200	Running	2	155
7	35	29	Steve Grissom	Diamond Ridge Motorsports	Chevrolet	200	Running	0	146
8	11	5	Terry Labonte	Hendrick Motorsports	Chevrolet	200	Running	0	142
9	9	25	Ken Schrader	Hendrick Motorsports	Chevrolet	200	Running	0	138
10	30	21	Morgan Shepherd	Wood Brothers Racing	Ford	200	Running	0	134
11	17	15	Dick Trickle	Bud Moore Engineering	Ford	200	Running	0	130
12	13	42	Kyle Petty	Team SABCO	Pontiac	200	Running	0	127
13	18	10	Ricky Rudd	Rudd Performance Motorsports	Ford	200	Running	0	124
14	16	9	Lake Speed	Melling Racing	Ford	200	Running	0	121
15	21	31	Ward Burton	Dilliard Racing	Ford	200	Running	0	118
16	14	41	Ricky Craven #	Larry Hedrick Motorsports	Chevrolet	200	Running	0	115
17	37	27	Loy Allen Jr.	Junior Johnson & Associates	Ford	200	Running	0	112
18	25	43	Bobby Hamilton	Petty Enterprises	Pontiac	200	Running	0	109
19	27	80	Joe Ruttman	Hover Motorsports	Ford	200	Running	0	106
20	40	7	Geoff Bodine (W)	Geoff Bodine Racing	Ford	200	Running	0	103
21	41	1	Rick Mast	Precision Products Racing	Ford	200	Running	1	105
22	4	24	Jeff Gordon	Hendrick Motorsports	Chevrolet	199	Running	61	102
23	10	94	Bill Elliott (W)	Elliott-Hardy Racing	Ford	199	Running	0	94
24	28	8	Jeff Burton	Stavola Brothers Racing	Ford	199	Running	0	91
25	39	11	Brett Bodine	Junior Johnson & Associates	Ford	199	Running	0	88
26	31	33	Robert Pressley #	Leo Jackson Motorsports	Chevrolet	199	Running	0	85
27	38	37	John Andretti	Kranefuss-Haas Racing	Ford	197	Running	0	82
28	26	66	Ben Hess	RaDiUs Motorsports	Ford	196	Running	0	79
29	24	22	Randy LaJoie #	Bill Davis Racing	Pontiac	195	Running	0	76
30	20	18	Bobby Labonte	Joe Gibbs Racing	Chevrolet	185	Accident	0	73
31	22	12	Derrike Cope (W)	Bobby Allison Motorsports	Ford	184	Running	0	70
32	5	17	Darrell Waltrip (W)	Darrell Waltrip Motorsports	Chevrolet	180	Running	0	67
33	33	77	Davy Jones #	Jasper Motorsports	Ford	166	Running	0	64
34	7	2	Rusty Wallace	Penske Racing South	Ford	158	Accident	0	61
35	29	98	Jeremy Mayfield	Cale Yarborough Motorsports	Ford	155	Engine	0	58
36	19	71	Dave Marcis	Marcis Auto Racing	Chevrolet	129	Engine	1	60
37	8	75	Todd Bodine	RahMoc Enterprises	Ford	105	Engine	0	52
38	34	44	Jeff Purvis	Phoenix Racing	Chevrolet	57	Accident	0	49
39	36	90	Mike Wallace	Donlavey Racing	Ford	57	Accident	0	46
40	42	26	Steve Kinser #	King Racing	Ford	27	Accident	0	43
41	32	19	Phil Parsons	TriStar Motorsports	Ford	27	Accident	0	40
42	23	87	Joe Nemechek	NEMCO Motorsports	Chevrolet	8	Accident	0	37
Failed to qualify
		20	Bobby Hillin Jr.	Moroso Racing	Ford				
		40	Greg Sacks	Dick Brooks Racing	Pontiac				
		14	Randy MacDonald	Hagan Racing	Pontiac				
		95	Doug Heveron	Sadler Brothers Racing	Ford				
		82	Terry Byers #	Byers Racing	Ford				
		52	Gary Bradberry #	Means Racing	Ford				
		62	Ronnie Sanders	Henley Gray Racing	Ford				
		81	Kenny Wallace	FILMAR Racing	Ford				
		73	Phil Barkdoll	Barkdoll Racing	Ford				
		99	Shawna Robinson	CPR Motorsports	Ford				
		72	Jim Sauter	Marcis Auto Racing	Chevrolet				
		51	Kerry Teague	Phoenix Racing	Chevrolet				
		97	Chad Little	Mark Rypien Motorsports	Ford				
		68	Bob Strait	Strait Racing	Ford				
		23	Jimmy Spencer	Travis Carter Enterprises	Ford				
		0	Delma Cowart	H. L. Waters Racing	Ford				
		47	Billy Standridge	Johnson Racing	Ford				
		67	Ken Bouchard	Cunningham Racing	Ford				
		48	James Hylton	Hylton Racing	Pontiac				
		53	Ritchie Petty	Petty Brothers Racing	Ford				
		32	Mike Chase #	Active Motorsports	Chevrolet				
		65	Steve Seligman	O'Neil Racing	Ford				
# Rookie of the Year candidate Source:
