= Miller Brewing Company =

American brewing company

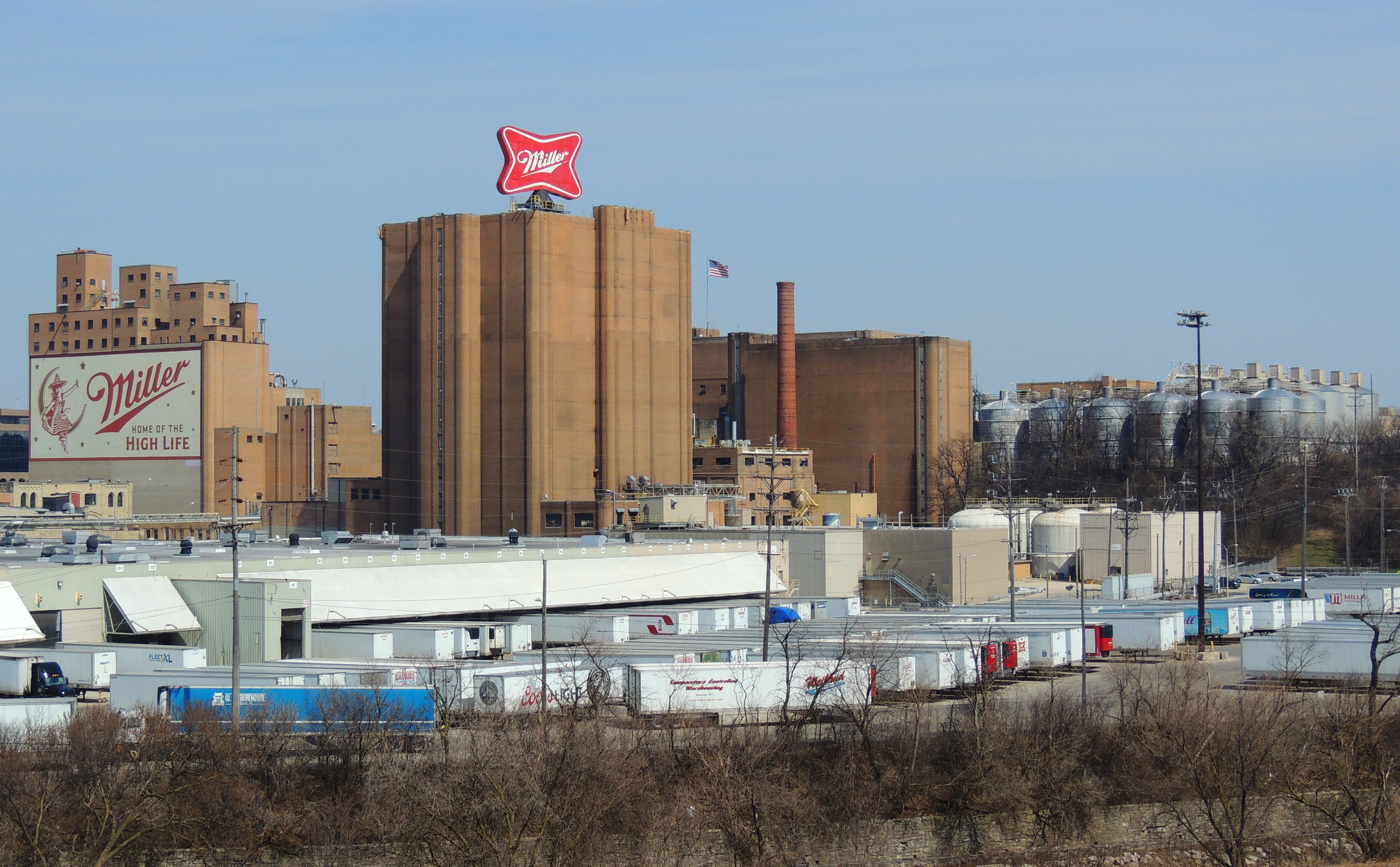
- Miller Brewery in Milwaukee
- Type: Subsidiary
- Industry: Beverages
- Founded: 1855; 171 years ago
- Founder: Frederick Miller
- Headquarters: 4251 West State Street; Milwaukee, Wisconsin, U.S.
- Products: Beer
- Parent: Molson Coors
- Website: www.molsoncoors.com

Miller Brewing Company is an American brewery based in Milwaukee, Wisconsin. It was founded in 1855 by Frederick Miller and was acquired by Molson Coors in 2016. Molson Coors continues to operate the Miller Brewery at the site of the original Miller Brewing Company complex in Milwaukee. Miller has produced several prominent beer brands, including Miller Lite, Miller High Life, and Milwaukee's Best.

== History ==
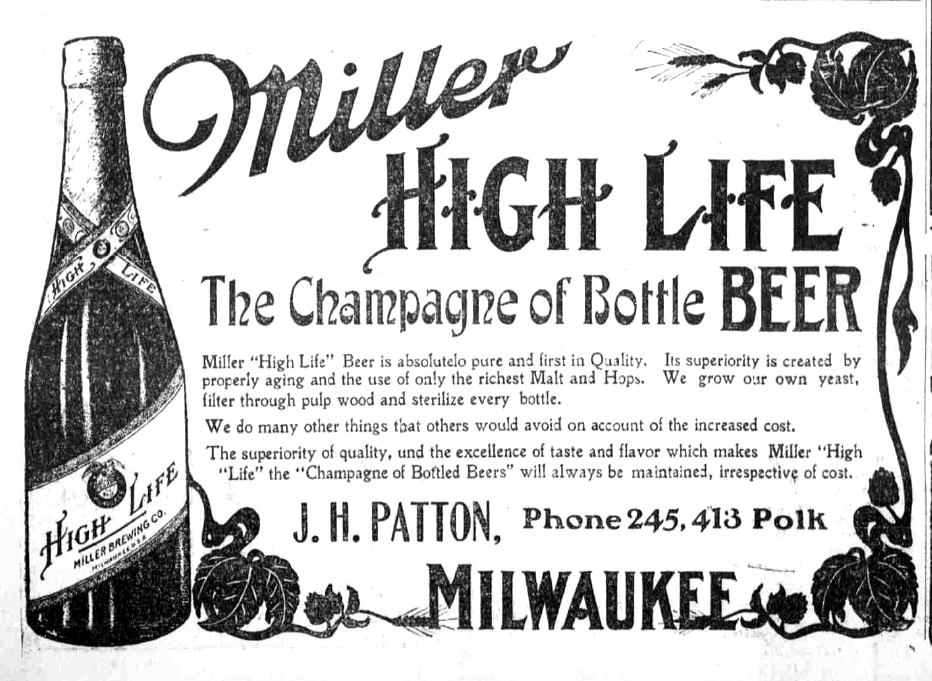
Miller High Life advertisement, 1906

Miller Brewing Company was founded in Milwaukee in 1855 by Frederick Miller after his emigration from Hohenzollern, Germany, in 1854 with a unique brewer's yeast. Initially, he purchased the small Plank Road Brewery for $2,300 (equivalent to $82,417 in 2025). The brewery's location in what is now the Miller Valley provided easy access to raw materials produced on nearby farms. In 1855, Miller changed its name to Miller Brewing Company, Inc. The enterprise remained in the family until 1966.

The company was one of six breweries affected by the 1953 Milwaukee brewery strike. In 1961, Miller purchased the smallest of the "Big Five" Milwaukee brewers, A. Gettelman Brewing Company. In 1966, the conglomerate W. R. Grace and Company bought Miller from Lorraine John Mulberger (Frederick Miller's granddaughter, who objected to alcohol) and her family. In 1969, Philip Morris (now Altria) bought Miller from W. R. Grace for $130 million, outbidding PepsiCo. In 1999, Miller acquired the Hamm's brand from Pabst.

In 2002, South African Breweries bought Miller from Philip Morris for $3.6 billion worth of stock and $2 billion in debt to form SABMiller, with Philip Morris retaining a 36% ownership share and 24.99% voting rights. In 2006, SABMiller purchased the Sparks and Steel Reserve brands from McKenzie River Corporation for $215 million. Miller had been producing both brands prior to the purchase.

On July 1, 2008, SABMiller formed MillerCoors, a joint venture with rival Molson Coors, to consolidate the production and distribution of its products in the United States, with each parent company's corporate operations and international operations to remain separate and independent of the joint venture. SABMiller owned 58% of the unit, which operated in the United States but not in Canada, where Molson Coors is strongest, but the companies had equal voting power.

In September 2015, Anheuser-Busch InBev announced it had reached a full agreement to acquire SABMiller for $107 billion. As part of the agreement with the U.S. Justice Department, SABMiller divested itself of the Miller brands in the U.S. by selling its stake in MillerCoors to Molson Coors. Consequently, on October 11, 2016, SABMiller in the U.S. sold its interests in MillerCoors to Molson Coors for around US $12 billion. Molson Coors gained full ownership of the Miller brand portfolio outside the US, and retained the rights within the U.S. (including Puerto Rico).

== Brands ==
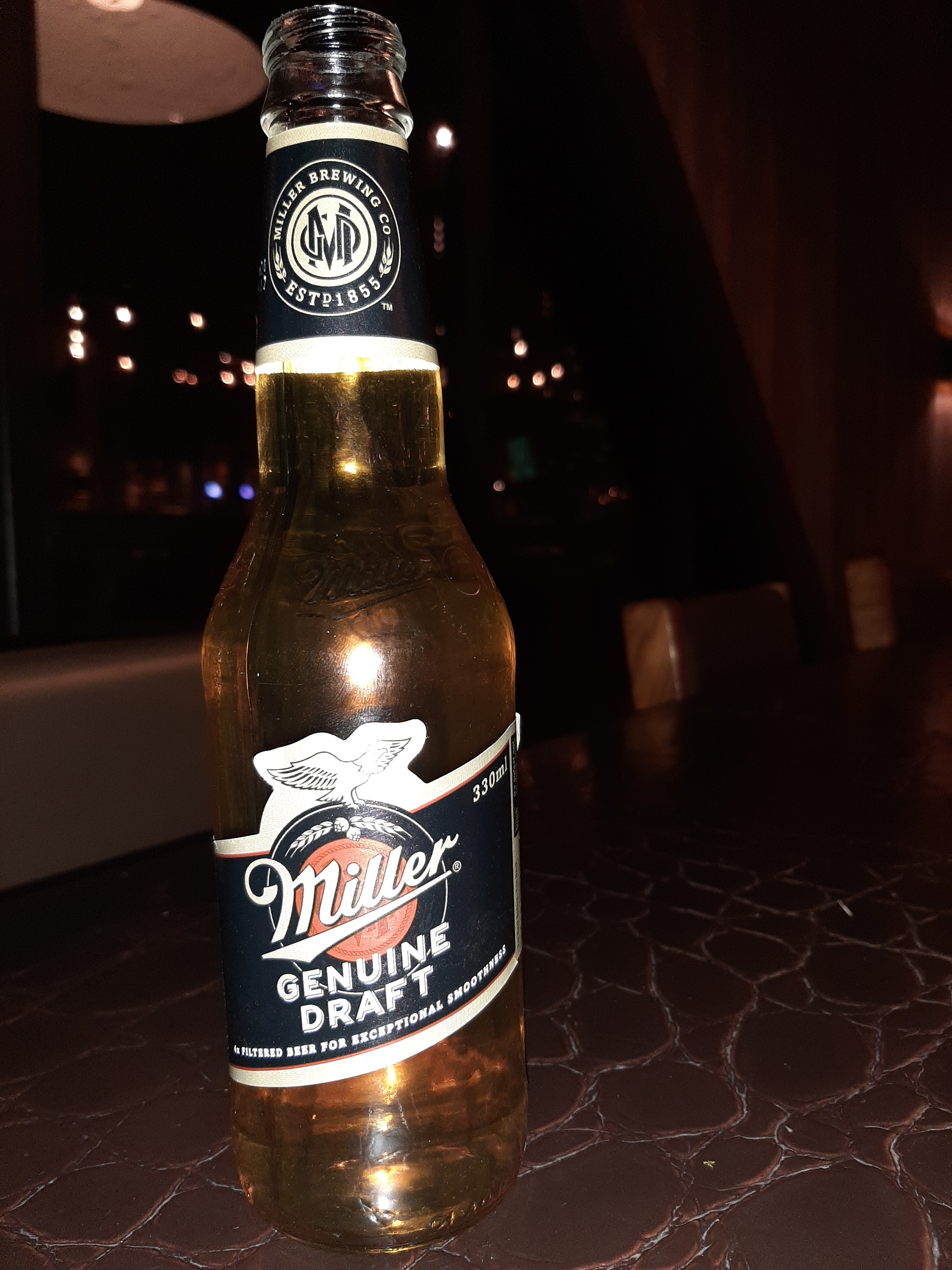
Miller Genuine Draft 330mL bottle

Brands with the Miller name, or historically sold by Miller Brewing Company, include:

- Miller High Life: An American-style lager introduced in 1903, High Life is Miller Brewing's oldest brand and is 4.6% abv. It is noted for its high level of carbonation, like champagne, leading to its longtime slogan "The Champagne of Beers". It was one of the top premium beers in the US for many years. High Life bottles feature a bright gold label and are made of a clear glass that has a tapered neck like a champagne bottle. The label includes the "Girl in the Moon" logo, which features a woman in a circus costume seated on a crescent moon. The brand helped popularize 7 U.S. fl oz (207 ml) pony bottles, introduced in 1972.
- Miller Lite: An American-style light lager. Introduced in 1972, it was the first light beer to see wide popularity. It is 4.2% abv (4% in Canada).
- Miller High Life Light: Introduced in 1994, it had 4.1% abv. It was discontinued in 2021 to focus on Miller Lite, but brought back in 2024.
- Miller Genuine Draft: Nicknamed MGD, it was introduced in 1985 as "Miller High Life Genuine Draft". Developed to replicate the flavor of High Life from a non-pasteurized keg in a can or bottle, MGD is made from the same recipe as High Life but the beer is cold filtered instead of pasteurized. As of 2007 Genuine Draft had a 1.5% share of the United States market; by 2012 it had declined to 0.7% market share, representing a decline of 1.7 million barrels. It has 4.7% abv.
- Miller 64: (Formerly Miller Genuine Draft 64) An "ultra light" beer with 2.8% abv, it contains 64 calories per 12 US fl oz (355 mL) serving (750 kJ/L). Miller launched this beer in the summer of 2007 in Madison, Wisconsin. It was received favorably and testing expanded to Arizona, San Diego and Sacramento.
- Frederick Miller Classic Chocolate Lager: A seasonal lager available from October to December in Wisconsin, Chicago, Minneapolis, Cleveland, Indianapolis and northwest Indiana. It is brewed with six different malts, including chocolate and dark chocolate malts.
- Miller Sharp's: A non-alcoholic beer introduced in 1989.

=== Economy brands ===
- Milwaukee's Best: Miller's economy label. It is 4.8% abv.
- Milwaukee's Best Light: Light version of Milwaukee's Best. It is 4.1% abv.
- Milwaukee's Best Ice: Miller's economy ice beer. It is 5.9% abv.

=== Malt liquor ===
- Mickey's: Mickey's is a malt liquor that is 5.6% abv.
- Olde English 800: Malt liquor also known as "OE". It is 5.9% abv in the eastern United States, 7.5% abv in most western U.S. states and 8.0% abv in Canada.

=== Discontinued ===
- Miller Chill: A chelada-style 4.2% abv pale lager brewed with lime and salt. Introduced successfully in 2007, sales dropped in 2008 after the launch of the rival Bud Light Lime. In response, MillerCoors revamped their recipe from a 'chelada' style brew to a light beer with lime, created new packaging which included switching from a green to a clear bottle, and launched a new advertising campaign centered around the slogan "How a Light Beer with a Taste of Lime Should Taste". It was discontinued in 2013.

== Sponsorships ==
At the 1978 United States Grand Prix, 1978 Canadian Grand Prix and 1979 Long Beach Grand Prix, the McLaren Formula One team raced a special Löwenbräu livery and entered the Grands Prix as Löwenbräu Team McLaren to promote the brand in the region. At the time, Miller Brewing Company was owned by Phillip Morris (who was the title sponsor of McLaren) and had secured the license to produce Löwenbräu in its United States breweries.

Miller has been a large motorsport sponsor since the 1980s. In the CART World Series, the company has sponsored drivers such as Al Unser (1984), Danny Sullivan (1985–1989, 1991), Roberto Guerrero (1990), Bobby Rahal (1992–1998) and Kenny Bräck (2003). It also sponsored the Miller 200 race at Mid-Ohio.

In 1997, Miller, under its Miller Lite brand, sponsored a car in the Indy Racing League, specifically for the Indianapolis 500. The car was driven by Arie Luyendyk. This sponsorship was significant as Luyendyk won the 1997 Indianapolis 500.

In the NASCAR Cup Series, Miller has sponsored Bobby Allison from 1983 to 1988, Dick Trickle in 1989, Rusty Wallace from 1990 to 2005, Kurt Busch from 2006 to 2010, and Brad Keselowski from 2011 to 2020. Allison won the 1983 NASCAR Winston Cup Series, and Keselowski won the 2012 NASCAR Sprint Cup Series. The company has sponsored the Miller High Life 500, Miller 500, Miller High Life 400, Miller 400, Miller 300, Miller 200, and Miller 150 races.

In the NHRA, Miller sponsored Larry Dixon for 11 years until 2007.

From its opening in 2001 until the end of 2020, Miller owned the naming rights to Miller Park, home of the Milwaukee Brewers when the naming rights were bought by American Family Insurance in 2019.

In 2022, Miller, under its Miller High Life brand, has even launched a campaign for ministers–Universal Life Church

== See also ==
- Beer in Milwaukee
- Spaghett
- Windell Middlebrooks
