= Miller Genuine Draft 500 =

Miller Genuine Draft 500 may refer to:

- Miller Genuine Draft 500 (1st Pocono), 1990 race at Pocono Raceway
- Miller Genuine Draft 500 (2nd Pocono), 1991–1995 races at Pocono Raceway
- Miller Genuine Draft 500 (Dover), 1995 race at Dover International Speedway

== See also ==
- Miller 500 (disambiguation)
- Miller High Life 500 (disambiguation)
