= Danny Sullivan =

American racing driver (born 1950)

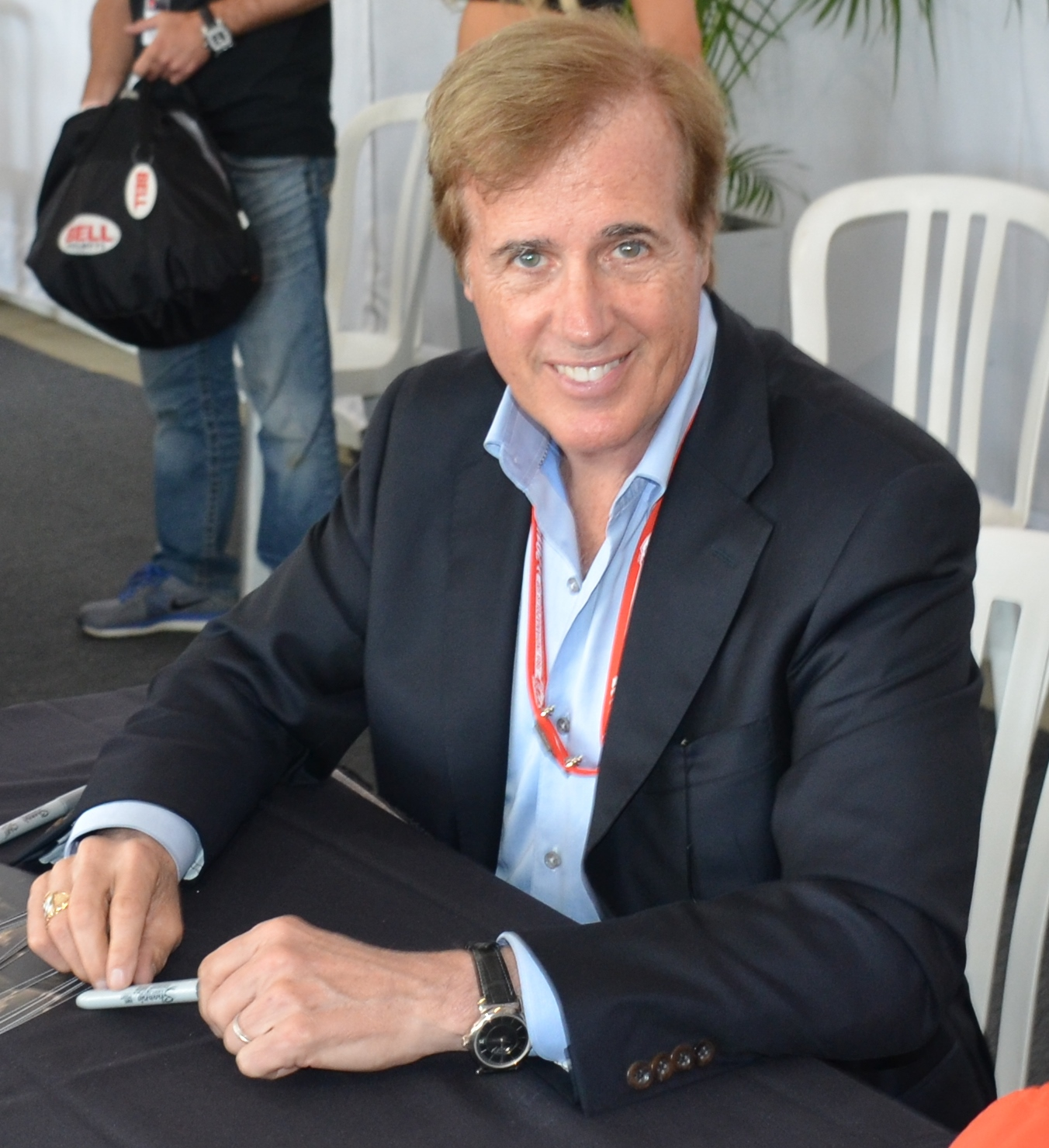
- Sullivan in 2015
- Born: Daniel John Sullivan III; March 9, 1950 (age 76) Louisville, Kentucky, U.S.

Championship titles
- CART Championship Car (1988); Major victories Pocono 500 (1984, 1989); Indianapolis 500 (1985); Michigan 500 (1988); Long Beach Grand Prix (1992)

Champ Car career
- 171 races run over 12 years
- Best finish: 1st (1988)
- First race: 1982 Stroh's 200 (Atlanta)
- Last race: 1995 Michigan 500 (Michigan)
- First win: 1984 Cleveland Grand Prix (Cleveland)
- Last win: 1993 Detroit Grand Prix (Belle Isle)
Wins	Podiums	Poles
17	40	19

Formula One World Championship career
- Nationality: (United States) American
- Active years: 1983
- Team: Tyrrell
- Entries: 15
- Championships: 0
- Wins: 0
- Podiums: 0
- Career points: 2
- Pole positions: 0
- Fastest laps: 0
- First entry: 1983 Brazilian Grand Prix
- Last entry: 1983 South African Grand Prix

NASCAR Cup Series career
- 1 race run over 2 years
- Best finish: 74th (1994)
- First race: 1994 Brickyard 400 (Indianapolis)
Wins	Top tens	Poles
0	0	0

24 Hours of Le Mans career
- Years: 1988, 1994, 1996, 2004
- Teams: TWR-Jaguar, Porsche, Bigazzi, Barron Connor
- Best finish: 3rd (1994)
- Class wins: 0

Daniel John Sullivan III (born March 9, 1950) is an American former racing driver. He earned 17 wins in the CART Indy Car World Series, including the 1985 Indianapolis 500. Sullivan won the 1988 CART Championship, and placed third in points in 1986. Sullivan also scored a victory in IROC. He competed in the 1983 Formula One season with Tyrrell, scoring two championship points.

== Before racing ==
Sullivan was born in Louisville, Kentucky to a building contractor father. He attended the Kentucky Military Institute and then the Jim Russell Racing School. He had several odd jobs before his racing career, including lumberjack, and most famously, New York City cab driver.

== Formula One ==
Sullivan was given a 21st birthday present of a course at the Jim Russell Racing Drivers School at the Snetterton circuit in England. He competed in Formula Ford, Formula Three and Formula Two before returning to race in the United States.

From 1980 to 1981, Sullivan drove for Garvin Brown Racing in the SCCA Can-Am Series, scoring one victory in 1981 at the season-ending Caesars Palace Grand Prix.

In 1982, Sullivan made his début in the PPG Indycar series, and was recruited by the Tyrrell Formula One team for the 1983 season at the request of primary sponsor Benetton, who wanted an American driver. Sullivan competed in the fifteen races of the 1983 season, scoring two points with a fifth place at the Monaco Grand Prix and finishing seventeenth in the World Drivers' Championship. He also performed strongly in the non-championship Race of Champions held at the Brands Hatch circuit in April, seeing off an early race challenge from 1980 World Champion Alan Jones, before finishing second behind reigning World Champion Keke Rosberg, finishing only half-a-second behind the Williams after 40 laps of racing.

Nevertheless, Sullivan was somewhat overshadowed by his more experienced teammate, Michele Alboreto (who won the 1983 Detroit Grand Prix for the team, its last F1 victory), and was not retained at the end of the season.

== CART career ==
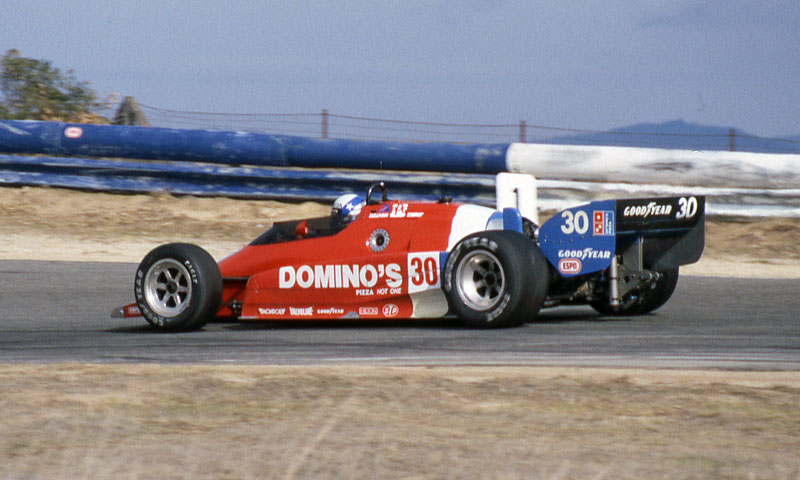
Sullivan's Lola T800 at Laguna Seca in 1984.

For 1984, Sullivan returned to North America, where he competed in the CART PPG Indy Car series. He first landed at Shierson Racing, winning three races including the Pocono 500, and placing fourth in points. In 1985, he moved to Penske Racing, winning the 1985 Indianapolis 500. His victory at Indy, known in auto racing lore as the "spin and win" is one of the most legendary moments in Indy 500 history.

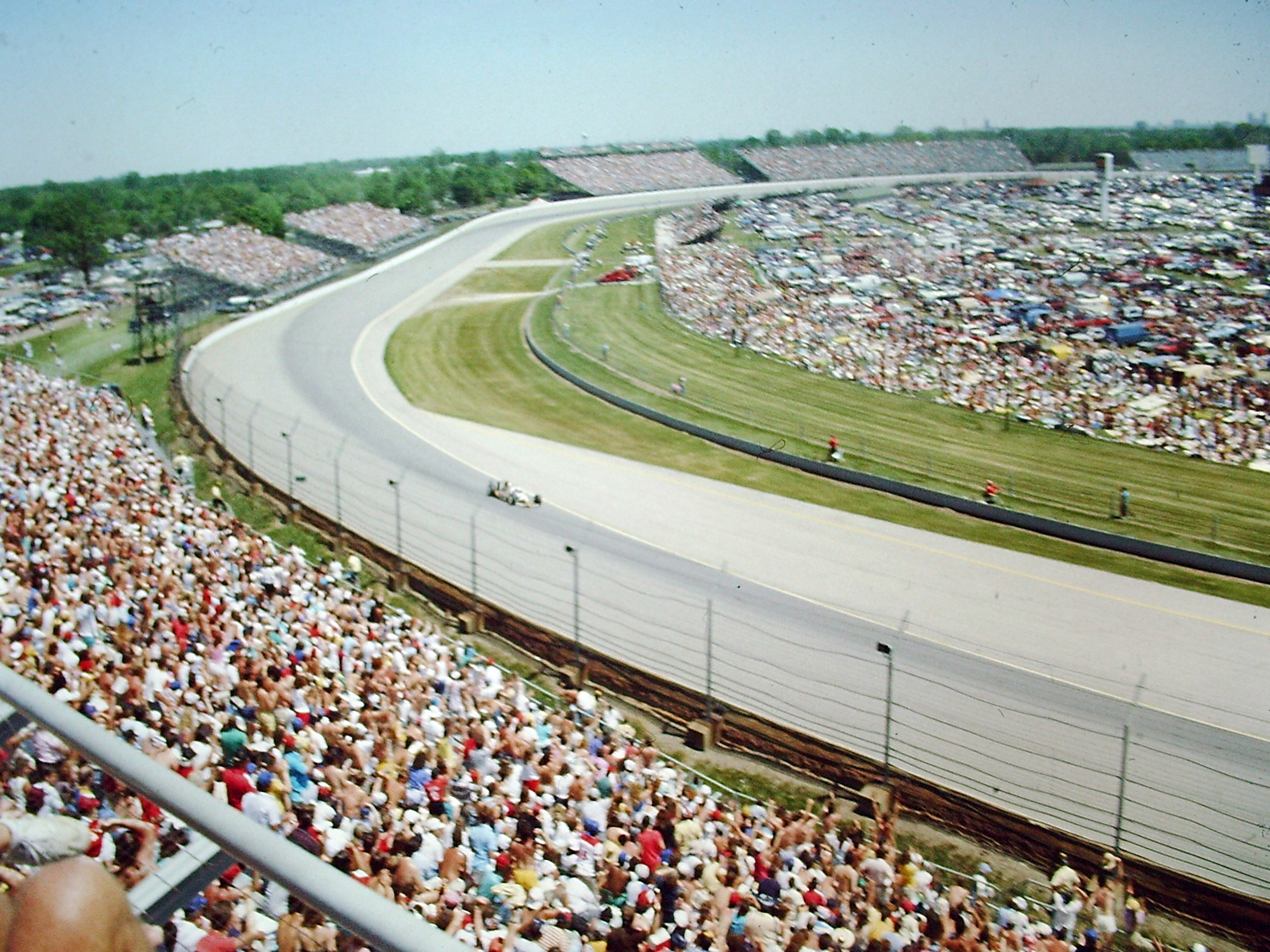
Sullivan during time trials as the 1988 Indianapolis 500.

Sullivan would set the pace at Indy again in 1988, qualifying second and leading 91 of the first 101 laps. Sullivan was part of the all-Penske front row with teammates Rick Mears and Al Unser Sr. A wing adjuster broke on Sullivan's car just after the halfway mark, and his car hit the outside wall in turn one, ending his day. Nevertheless, he rebounded, posting finishes of 4th or better over the next six races, winning at Portland and the Michigan 500. The win at Michigan completed a career Indy car Triple Crown (Indianapolis, Michigan, Pocono). He finished the season with five top-five finishes over the final five races, including two wins. At the second-to-last race of the season at Laguna Seca, Sullivan won the pole position, led the most laps, and won the race. With still one race remaining, Sullivan clinched the 1988 CART championship, holding an insurmountable 35-point lead. It was Sullivan's first championship title and Penske's first since 1985.

In 1989, Sullivan suffered a broken arm in a crash during practice for the Indy 500, and would miss two races. He rebounded to win the Pocono 500 in August - his second win in that event - and one other race to place a respectable seventh in points. Sullivan's last season with Penske Racing was 1990. He won two races in 1990, including the season finale at Laguna Seca. He won the pole and led wire-to-wire in his final start for Roger Penske.

In 1991, Sullivan switched to the Patrick Racing Alfa Romeo team. After going winless in 1991 in a very uncompetitive machine, he parted ways with Patrick. Sullivan won two more CART races between 1992 and 1993, driving for Galles-Kraco Racing. He scored the first win for the Galmer chassis at Long Beach. It came after he bumped teammate and race leader Al Unser Jr. on the backstretch with less than four laps to go. The incident sparked friction within the team. His later years were plagued with inconsistency, leading to a semi-retirement in 1994. His brief tenure at Galles was described as particularly toxic.

In 1986, Sullivan was a guest star on the television show Miami Vice ("Florence Italy") playing a race car driver accused of murdering a prostitute. The episode featured some short outdoor scenes in the pit lanes of the Miami Grand Prix. Sullivan had limited dialogue in the episode; his longest piece of dialogue was in a police station interrogation scene.

Also in 1991, the Leland Corporation released the arcade game Danny Sullivan's Indy Heat, featuring his likeness.

== After Indy ==
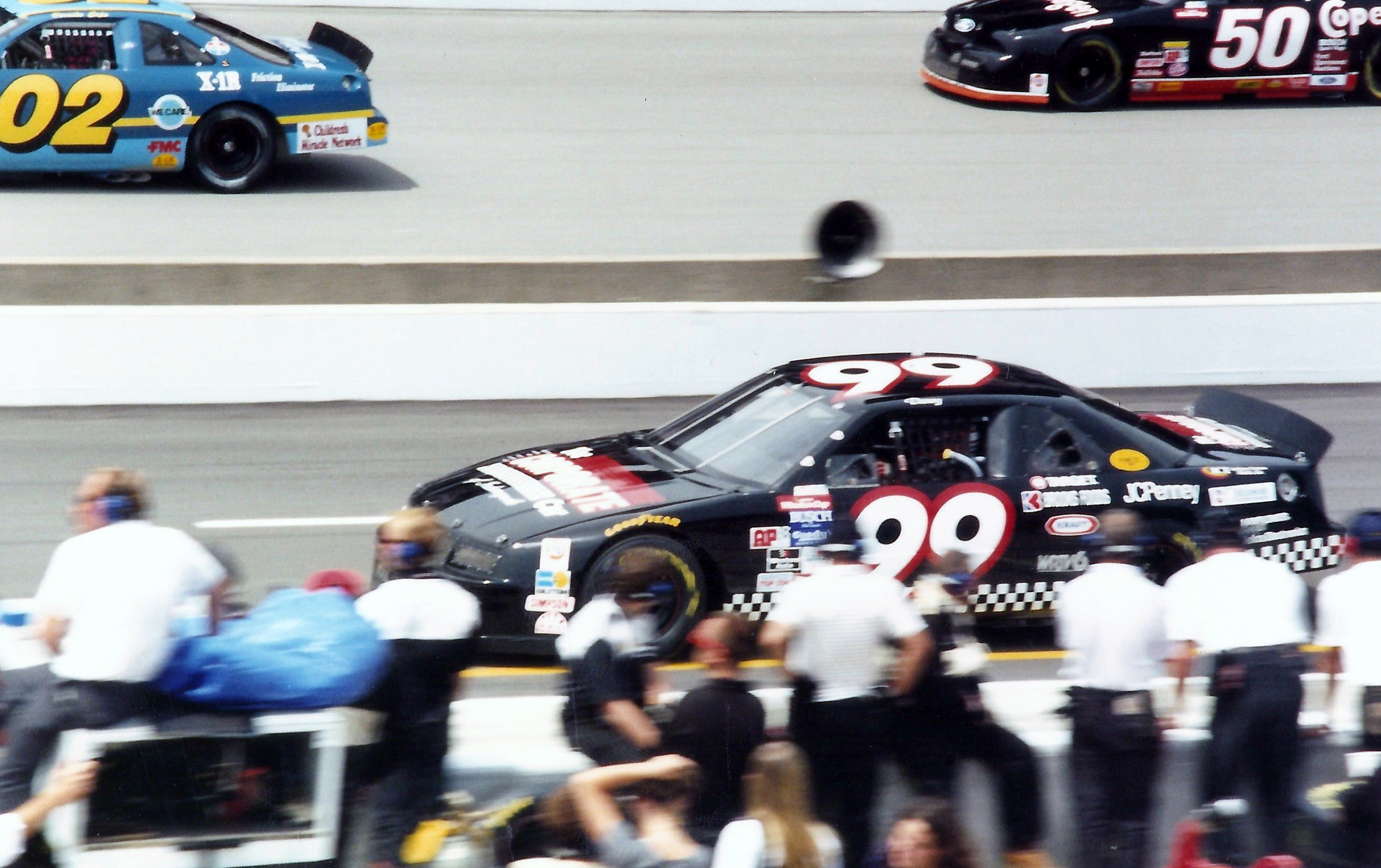
Sullivan (#99) at the 1994 NASCAR Brickyard 400

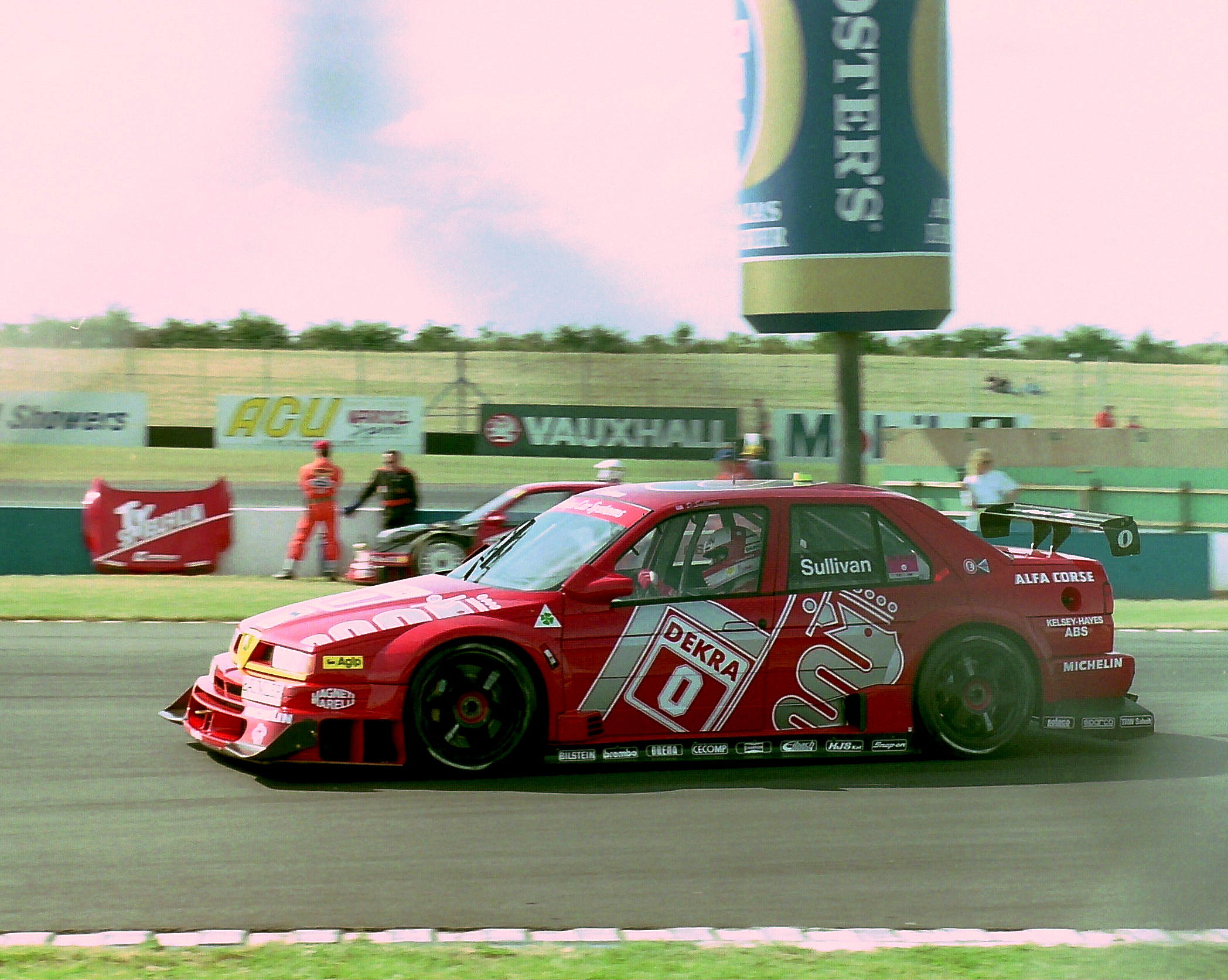
Danny Sullivan - Alfa Corse - Alfa Romeo 155 V6 TI 94, Donington 1994 DTM

In 1994, Sullivan took a sabbatical from Indy car racing. After being released from Galles Racing very late after the 1993 season, Sullivan was unable to find a new ride as most seats at that point had already been filled. He joined ABC/ESPN as a color commentator. He also attempted to run selected events in the NASCAR Winston Cup Series that season. However, he failed to qualify for several events; he qualified for only one race (the 1994 Brickyard 400), and finished 33rd for a very underfunded team. In 1994, he had some guest starts for Alfa Romeo in the DTM and together with Thierry Boutsen and Hans-Joachim Stuck he was third overall with the Dauer 962 LM at the 24 Hours of Le Mans.

Sullivan returned to CART racing for one final year in 1995. His season ended early after a serious crash at Michigan International Speedway. While recovering from a broken pelvis and other injuries, he announced his retirement from open-wheel competition. He returned to ABC-TV for 1996–1998.

Sullivan was a paid celebrity endorser for Danny Sullivan Lexus in Jacksonville, Florida. The Lexus Dealership was owned primarily by members of the Davis family, who were the founders of Winn Dixie supermarkets.

Sullivan was also instrumental in the Red Bull Driver Search program to find an American driver to compete in Formula One. The program successfully promoted American Scott Speed from California, who drove for the Scuderia Toro Rosso team in 2006 and 2007.

Sullivan was the drivers' representative on the stewards' panel for the 2010 German Grand Prix, 2010 Singapore Grand Prix, 2012 Hungarian Grand Prix, 2013 Australian Grand Prix, 2014 Spanish Grand Prix, 2017 Azerbaijan Grand Prix, 2018 Bahrain Grand Prix, 2018 Chinese Grand Prix, and 2018 Monaco Grand Prix.

Sullivan and Michael Andretti were inducted into the Motorsports Walk of Fame on April 5, 2010, along the route of the Toyota Grand Prix of Long Beach, which both men have won.

Sullivan serves as a senior advisor at Tempus Jets and its parent company, Orion Air Group, LLC. He also has various business relationships with Lexus, ABC/ESPN, CBS, Red Bull, Acura, and Toyota.

== Awards ==
Sullivan was inducted into the Motorsports Hall of Fame of America in 2012, and the Indianapolis Motor Speedway Hall of Fame in 2022.

== Racing career results ==
=== CART career results ===
Year	Team	No.	Chassis	Engine	1	2	3	4	5	6	7	8	9	10	11	12	13	14	15	16	17	Rank	Points	Ref
1982	Forsythe Newman	33	March 82C	Cosworth DFX	PHX	ATL; 3	MIL; 21	CLE	MIS	MIL	POC	RIV	ROA	MIS2	PHX2							22nd	28	
1984	Shierson Racing	30	DSR-1	Cosworth DFX	LBH; 24	PHX; 6		MIL; 16														4th	110	
1984	Shierson Racing	30	Lola T800	Cosworth DFX			INDY; 29		POR; 23	MEA; 2	CLE; 1	MIS; 10	ROA; 19	POC; 1	MDO; 3	SAN; 1	MIS2; 9	PHX2; 20	LS; 9	**LVG**; 18		4th	110	
1985	Team Penske	4	March 85C	Cosworth DFX	LBH; 3	INDY; 1	MIL; 4	**POR**; 27	MEA; 18	CLE; 27	MIS; 14	**ROA**; 13	POC; 5	MDO; 2	SAN; 5	MIS2; 8	LS; 8	PHX; 4	MIA; 1			4th	126	
1986	Team Penske	4	March 86C	Cosworth DFX	PHX; 4	**LBH**; 11	INDY; 9	MIL; 11	POR; 11	MEA; 1	**CLE**; 1	TOR; 2	MIS; 25	POC; 16	MDO; 3	SAN; 5	MIS; 12	ROA; 6	LS; 2	PHX2; 2		3rd	147	
1986	Team Penske	4	Penske PC-15	Ilmor-Chevrolet 265A																	MIA; 26	3rd	147	
1987	Team Penske	3	Penske PC-16	Ilmor-Chevrolet 265A	LBH; 22	PHX; 11			POR; 11	MEA; 20												9th	87	
1987	Team Penske	3	March 86C	Ilmor-Chevrolet 265A			INDY; 13	MIL; 11			CLE; 4	TOR; 2	MIS; 4	POC; 17	ROA; 5	MDO; 3	NAZ; 22	LS; 2	MIA; 12			9th	87	
1988	Team Penske	9	Penske PC-17	Ilmor-Chevrolet 265A	PHX; 23	**LBH**; 13	INDY; 23	MIL; 2	**POR**; 1	**CLE**; 3	**TOR**; 2	MEA; 4	MIS; 1	POC; 18	**MDO**; 5	**ROA**; 4	**NAZ**; 1	**LS**; 1	**MIA**; 5			1st	182	
1989	Team Penske	1	Penske PC-18	Ilmor-Chevrolet 265A	PHX; 3	LBH; 8	INDY; 28	MIL; 10	DET; 24	POR	CLE	MEA; 8	TOR; 3	MIS; 23	POC; 1	MDO; 5	**ROA**; 1	NAZ; 3	LS; 14			7th	107	
1990	Team Penske	7	Penske PC-19	Ilmor-Chevrolet 265A	PHX; 6	LBH; 3	INDY; 32	MIL; 8	DET; 14	**POR**; 4	CLE; 1	MEA; 14	**TOR**; 4	MIS; 21	DEN; 2	VAN; 2	MDO; 5	**ROA**; 16	NAZ; 18	**LS**; 1		6th	139	
1991	Patrick Racing	20	Lola T91/00	Alfa Romeo Indy V8	SRF; 4	LBH; 11	PHX; 7	INDY; 10	MIL; 5	DET; 10	POR; 21	CLE; 9	MEA; 6	TOR; 14	MIS; 18	DEN; 18	VAN; 9	MDO; 17	ROA; 16	NAZ; 20	LS; 9	11th	56	
1992	Galles Racing	18	Galmer G92	Ilmor-Chevrolet 265A	SRF; 5	PHX; 12	LBH; 1	INDY; 5	DET; 5	POR; 12	MIL; 12	NHA; 9	TOR; 3	MIS; 8	CLE; 20	ROA; 7	VAN; 7	MDO; 8	NAZ; 17	LS; 7		7th	99	
1993	Galles Racing	7	Lola T93/00	Ilmor-Chevrolet 265C	SRF; 13	PHX; 23	LBH; 8	INDY; 33	MIL; 16	DET; 1	POR; 14	CLE; 14	TOR; 3	MIS	NHA; 22	ROA; 26	VAN; 10	MDO; 27	NAZ; 20	LS; 27		12th	43	
1995	PacWest Racing	17	Reynard 95i	Ford XB	MIA; 9	SRF; 5	PHX; 27	LBH; 10	NAZ; 18	INDY; 9	MIL; 17	DET; 12	POR; 22	ROA; 25	TOR; 18	CLE; 5	MIS; 16	MDO	NHA	VAN	LS	19th	32	

=== Indianapolis 500 results ===
Year	Car	Start	Qual	Rank	Finish	Laps	Led	Retired	Team
1982	53	13	196.292	17	14	148	0	Crash T4	Forsythe
1984	30	28	203.567	17	29	57	0	Broken Wheel	Shierson
1985	5	8	210.298	8	1	200	67	Running	Penske
1986	1	2	215.382	2	9	197	0	Flagged	Penske
1987	3	16	210.271	6	13	160	4	Engine	Penske
1988	9	2	216.214	2	23	101	91	Crash T1	Penske
1989	1	26	216.027	15	28	41	0	Rear Axle	Penske
1990	7	9	220.310	9	32	19	0	Crash T1	Penske
1991	20	9	218.343	17	10	173	0	Turbo	Patrick/Alfa Romeo
1992	18	8	224.838	9	5	199	0	Flagged	Galles/Kraco
1993	7	12	219.428	19	33	29	0	Crash T3	Galles
1995	17	18	225.496	29	9	199	0	Running	PacWest
**Totals**						1523	162		

Starts	12
Poles	0
Front Row	2
Best Start	2nd
Wins	1
Top 5	2
Top 10	5
Retired	8
Laps Led	162
Races Led	3
Total Laps	1,523
Winnings	$2,064,211

=== Complete Formula One World Championship results ===
(key)

Year	Entrant	Chassis	Engine	1	2	3	4	5	6	7	8	9	10	11	12	13	14	15	WDC	Points
1983	Benetton Tyrrell Team	Tyrrell 011	Cosworth V8	BRA; 11	USW; 8	FRA; Ret	SMR; Ret	MON; 5	BEL; 12	DET; Ret	CAN; DSQ	GBR; 14	GER; 12	AUT; Ret	NED; Ret	ITA; Ret			17th	2
1983	Benetton Tyrrell Team	Tyrrell 012	Cosworth V8														EUR; Ret	RSA; 7	17th	2

=== Non-Championship Formula One results ===
(key) (Races in bold indicate pole position) (Races in italics indicate fastest lap)

Year	Entrant	Chassis	Engine	1
1983	Benetton Tyrrell Team	Tyrrell 011	Cosworth DFV V8	ROC; 2

=== NASCAR ===
(key) (Bold – Pole position awarded by qualifying time. Italics – Pole position earned by points standings or practice time. * – Most laps led.)

==== Winston Cup Series ====
NASCAR Winston Cup Series results
Year	Team	No.	Make	1	2	3	4	5	6	7	8	9	10	11	12	13	14	15	16	17	18	19	20	21	22	23	24	25	26	27	28	29	30	31	NWCC	Pts	Ref
1994	Mattei Motorsports	99	Pontiac	DAY	CAR; DNQ	RCH																													74th	64	
1994	Virtue Racing	99	Chevy				ATL; DNQ	DAR	BRI	NWS	MAR	TAL	SON	CLT	DOV	POC	MCH	DAY	NHA	POC	TAL	IND; 33	GLN	MCH	BRI	DAR	RCH	DOV	MAR	NWS	CLT	CAR	PHO	ATL	74th	64	

=== 24 Hours of Le Mans results ===
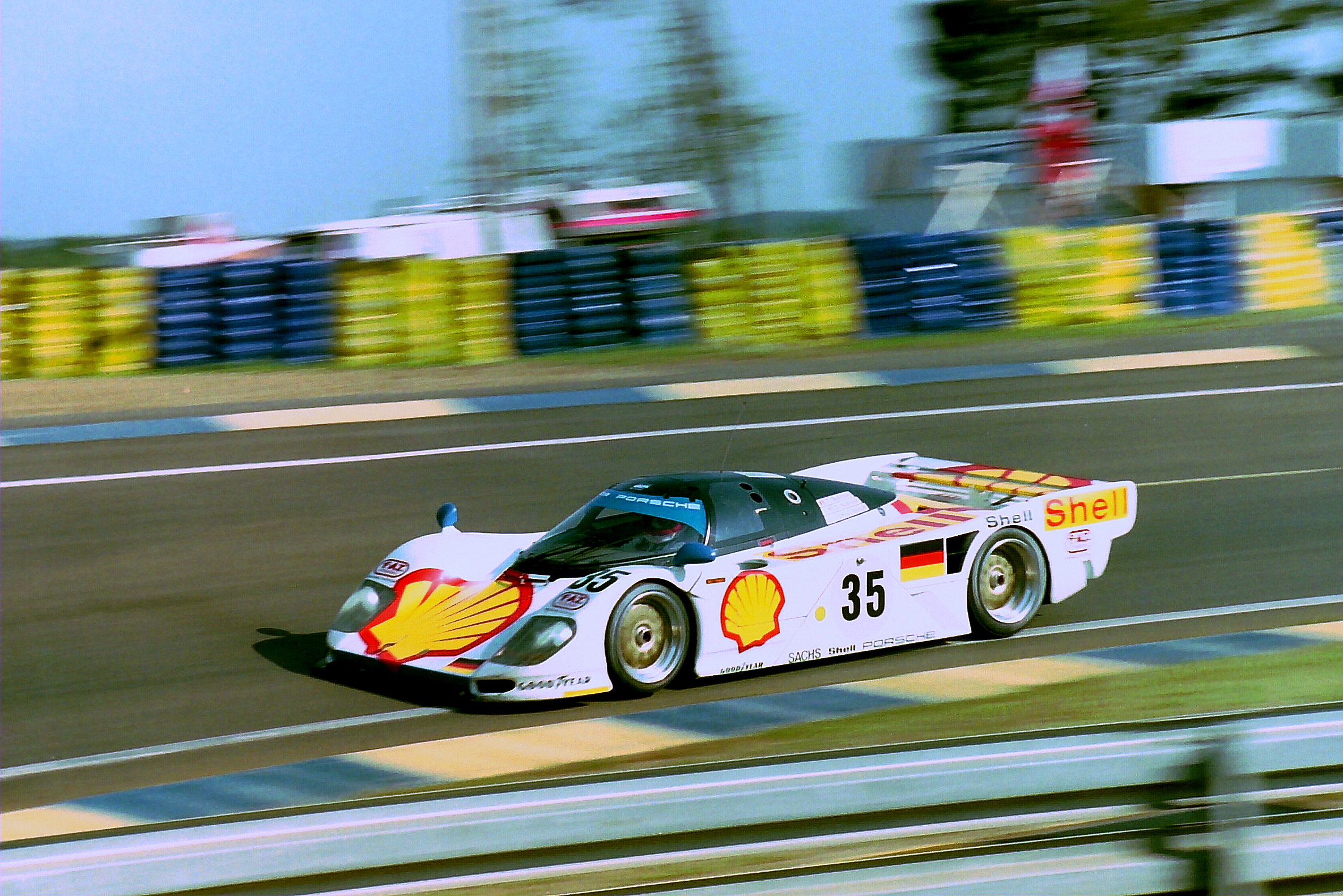
The Dauer 962 Le Mans Sullivan shared with Hans-Joachim Stuck and Thierry Boutsen in 1994

Year	Team	Co-drivers	Car	Class	Laps	Pos.	Class pos.
1988	(United States) Silk Cut Jaguar (United Kingdom) Tom Walkinshaw Racing	(United States) Price Cobb (United States) Davy Jones	Jaguar XJR-9LM	C1	331	16th	14th
1994	(Germany) Le Mans Porsche Team	(Belgium) Thierry Boutsen (Germany) Hans-Joachim Stuck	Dauer 962 Le Mans	LMGT1	343	**3rd**	**2nd**
1996	(Italy) Team Bigazzi SRL	(Venezuela) Johnny Cecotto (Brazil) Nelson Piquet	McLaren F1 GTR	LMGT1	324	8th	6th
2004	(Netherlands) Barron Connor Racing	(Italy) Thomas Biagi (Netherlands) John Bosch	Ferrari 575-GTC	GTS	163	DNF	DNF

== See also ==
- List of people from the Louisville metropolitan area

Sporting positions
Preceded by Rick Mears	Indianapolis 500; Winner; 1985	Succeeded by Bobby Rahal
Preceded by Bobby Rahal	PPG IndyCar World Series; Champion; 1988	Succeeded by Emerson Fittipaldi
