= Miller Genuine Draft 400 =

Miller Genuine Draft 400 may refer to:

- Miller Genuine Draft 400 (Michigan), at Michigan International Speedway from 1990 to 1995
- Miller Genuine Draft 400 (Richmond), at Richmond International Raceway from 1990 to 1995

== See also ==
- Miller 400 (disambiguation)
- Miller High Life 400 (disambiguation)
