= Miller High Life 400 =

Miller High Life 400 may refer to:

- Miller High Life 400 (Spring Richmond), from 1984 to 1987, now the Toyota Owners 400
- Miller High Life 400 (Michigan), in 1984 and from 1988 to 1989, now the FireKeepers Casino 400
- Miller High Life 400 (Fall Richmond), from 1988 to 1989, now the Federated Auto Parts 400

== See also ==
- Miller 400 (disambiguation)
- Miller Genuine Draft 400 (disambiguation)
