= 1994 Purolator 500 =

Fourth race of the 1994 NASCAR Winston Cup Series

Race details
- Race 4 of 31 in the 1994 NASCAR Winston Cup Series
- The 1994 Purolator 500 program cover, featuring Morgan Shepherd, Bill Elliott, and David Pearson. Artwork by NASCAR artist Sam Bass.
- Date: March 13, 1994
- Official name: 35th Annual Purolator 500
- Location: Hampton, Georgia, Atlanta Motor Speedway
- Course: Permanent racing facility
- Course length: 1.522 miles (2.449 km)
- Distance: 328 laps, 499.216 mi (803.41 km)
- Scheduled distance: 328 laps, 499.216 mi (803.41 km)
- Average speed: 146.136 miles per hour (235.183 km/h)
- Attendance: 102,000

Pole position
Driver	Loy Allen Jr.	TriStar Motorsports
- Time: 30.405

Most laps led
Driver	Ernie Irvan	Robert Yates Racing
- Laps: 207

Winner
No. 28	Ernie Irvan	Robert Yates Racing

Television in the United States
- Network: ABC
- Announcers: Bob Jenkins, Benny Parsons

Radio in the United States
- Radio: Motor Racing Network

The 1994 Purolator 500 was the fourth stock car race of the 1994 NASCAR Winston Cup Series season and the 35th iteration of the event. The race was held on Sunday, March 13, 1994, in Hampton, Georgia at Atlanta Motor Speedway, a 1.522 miles (2.449 km) permanent asphalt quad-oval intermediate speedway. The race took the scheduled 328 laps to complete. At race's end, Robert Yates Racing driver Ernie Irvan would manage to complete a dominant performance for the majority of the race to take his 11th career NASCAR Winston Cup Series victory, his second victory of the season, and his second straight victory. To fill out the top three, Wood Brothers Racing driver Morgan Shepherd and owner-driver Darrell Waltrip would finish second and third, respectively.

== Background ==
The layout of Atlanta Motor Speedway, the circuit where the race was held.

Atlanta Motor Speedway (formerly Atlanta International Raceway) is a 1.522-mile race track in Hampton, Georgia, United States, 20 miles (32 km) south of Atlanta. It has annually hosted NASCAR Winston Cup Series stock car races since its inauguration in 1960.

The venue was bought by Speedway Motorsports in 1990. In 1994, 46 condominiums were built over the northeastern side of the track. In 1997, to standardize the track with Speedway Motorsports' other two intermediate ovals, the entire track was almost completely rebuilt. The frontstretch and backstretch were swapped, and the configuration of the track was changed from oval to quad-oval, with a new official length of 1.54-mile (2.48 km) where before it was 1.522-mile (2.449 km). The project made the track one of the fastest on the NASCAR circuit.

=== Entry list ===
- (R) - denotes rookie driver.

#	Driver	Team	Make
1	Rick Mast	Precision Products Racing	Ford
2	Rusty Wallace	Penske Racing South	Ford
02	Curtis Markham	Taylor Racing	Ford
3	Dale Earnhardt	Richard Childress Racing	Chevrolet
4	Sterling Marlin	Morgan–McClure Motorsports	Chevrolet
5	Terry Labonte	Hendrick Motorsports	Chevrolet
6	Mark Martin	Roush Racing	Ford
7	Geoff Bodine	Geoff Bodine Racing	Ford
8	Jeff Burton (R)	Stavola Brothers Racing	Ford
9	Rich Bickle (R)	Melling Racing	Ford
10	Ricky Rudd	Rudd Performance Motorsports	Ford
11	Bill Elliott	Junior Johnson & Associates	Ford
12	Chuck Bown	Bobby Allison Motorsports	Ford
14	John Andretti (R)	Hagan Racing	Chevrolet
15	Lake Speed	Bud Moore Engineering	Ford
16	Ted Musgrave	Roush Racing	Ford
17	Darrell Waltrip	Darrell Waltrip Motorsports	Chevrolet
18	Dale Jarrett	Joe Gibbs Racing	Chevrolet
19	Loy Allen Jr. (R)	TriStar Motorsports	Ford
20	Buddy Baker	Moroso Racing	Ford
21	Morgan Shepherd	Wood Brothers Racing	Ford
22	Bobby Labonte	Bill Davis Racing	Pontiac
23	Hut Stricklin	Travis Carter Enterprises	Ford
24	Jeff Gordon	Hendrick Motorsports	Chevrolet
25	Ken Schrader	Hendrick Motorsports	Chevrolet
26	Brett Bodine	King Racing	Ford
27	Jimmy Spencer	Junior Johnson & Associates	Ford
28	Ernie Irvan	Robert Yates Racing	Ford
29	Steve Grissom	Diamond Ridge Motorsports	Chevrolet
30	Michael Waltrip	Bahari Racing	Pontiac
31	Ward Burton	A.G. Dillard Motorsports	Chevrolet
32	Dick Trickle	Active Motorsports	Chevrolet
33	Harry Gant	Leo Jackson Motorsports	Chevrolet
40	Bobby Hamilton	SABCO Racing	Pontiac
41	Joe Nemechek (R)	Larry Hedrick Motorsports	Chevrolet
42	Kyle Petty	SABCO Racing	Pontiac
43	Wally Dallenbach Jr.	Petty Enterprises	Pontiac
47	Billy Standridge (R)	Johnson Standridge Racing	Ford
51	Jeff Purvis	Phoenix Racing	Chevrolet
55	Jimmy Hensley	RaDiUs Motorsports	Ford
61	Rick Carelli	Chesrown Racing	Chevrolet
71	Dave Marcis	Marcis Auto Racing	Chevrolet
75	Todd Bodine	Butch Mock Motorsports	Ford
77	Greg Sacks	U.S. Motorsports Inc.	Ford
80	Jimmy Horton	Hover Motorsports	Ford
89	Jim Sauter	Mueller Brothers Racing	Ford
90	Mike Wallace (R)	Donlavey Racing	Ford
95	Jeremy Mayfield (R)	Sadler Brothers Racing	Ford
98	Derrike Cope	Cale Yarborough Motorsports	Ford
99	Danny Sullivan	Virtue Racing	Chevrolet

== Qualifying ==
Qualifying was split into two rounds. The first round was held on Friday, March 11, at 2:30 PM EST. Each driver would have one lap to set a time. During the first round, the top 20 drivers in the round would be guaranteed a starting spot in the race. If a driver was not able to guarantee a spot in the first round, they had the option to scrub their time from the first round and try and run a faster lap time in a second round qualifying run, held on Saturday, March 12, at 10:30 AM EST. As with the first round, each driver would have one lap to set a time. For this specific race, positions 21-40 would be decided on time, and depending on who needed it, a select amount of positions were given to cars who had not otherwise qualified but were high enough in owner's points; which was usually two. If needed, a past champion who did not qualify on either time or provisionals could use a champion's provisional, adding one more spot to the field.

Loy Allen Jr., driving for TriStar Motorsports, won the pole, setting a time of 30.405 and an average speed of 180.207 mph (290.015 km/h) in the first round.

Eight drivers would fail to qualify.

=== Full qualifying results ===
Pos.	#	Driver	Team	Make	Time	Speed
1	19	Loy Allen Jr. (R)	TriStar Motorsports	Ford	30.405	180.207
2	7	Geoff Bodine	Geoff Bodine Racing	Ford	30.469	179.829
3	5	Terry Labonte	Hendrick Motorsports	Chevrolet	30.510	179.587
4	6	Mark Martin	Roush Racing	Ford	30.541	179.405
5	41	Joe Nemechek (R)	Larry Hedrick Motorsports	Chevrolet	30.554	179.328
6	9	Rich Bickle (R)	Melling Racing	Ford	30.560	179.293
7	28	Ernie Irvan	Robert Yates Racing	Ford	30.566	179.258
8	31	Ward Burton (R)	A.G. Dillard Motorsports	Chevrolet	30.605	179.030
9	12	Chuck Bown	Bobby Allison Motorsports	Ford	30.606	179.024
10	77	Greg Sacks	U.S. Motorsports Inc.	Ford	30.626	178.907
11	33	Harry Gant	Leo Jackson Motorsports	Chevrolet	30.669	178.656
12	2	Rusty Wallace	Penske Racing South	Ford	30.681	178.586
13	8	Jeff Burton (R)	Stavola Brothers Racing	Ford	30.691	178.528
14	21	Morgan Shepherd	Wood Brothers Racing	Ford	30.724	178.336
15	26	Brett Bodine	King Racing	Ford	30.725	178.330
16	3	Dale Earnhardt	Richard Childress Racing	Chevrolet	30.744	178.220
17	24	Jeff Gordon	Hendrick Motorsports	Chevrolet	30.752	178.174
18	02	Curtis Markham	Taylor Racing	Ford	30.833	177.706
19	75	Todd Bodine	Butch Mock Motorsports	Ford	30.847	177.625
20	32	Dick Trickle	Active Motorsports	Chevrolet	30.871	177.487
Failed to lock in Round 1
21	11	Bill Elliott	Junior Johnson & Associates	Ford	30.885	177.407
22	10	Ricky Rudd	Rudd Performance Motorsports	Ford	30.897	177.338
23	4	Sterling Marlin	Morgan–McClure Motorsports	Chevrolet	30.902	177.309
24	25	Ken Schrader	Hendrick Motorsports	Chevrolet	30.910	177.263
25	27	Jimmy Spencer	Junior Johnson & Associates	Ford	30.927	177.166
26	14	John Andretti (R)	Hagan Racing	Chevrolet	30.950	177.034
27	42	Kyle Petty	SABCO Racing	Pontiac	30.966	176.942
28	51	Jeff Purvis	Phoenix Racing	Chevrolet	31.009	176.697
29	98	Derrike Cope	Cale Yarborough Motorsports	Ford	31.031	176.572
30	22	Bobby Labonte	Bill Davis Racing	Pontiac	31.033	176.560
31	29	Steve Grissom (R)	Diamond Ridge Motorsports	Chevrolet	31.043	176.504
32	30	Michael Waltrip	Bahari Racing	Pontiac	31.054	176.441
33	40	Bobby Hamilton	SABCO Racing	Pontiac	31.069	176.356
34	15	Lake Speed	Bud Moore Engineering	Ford	31.076	176.316
35	16	Ted Musgrave	Roush Racing	Ford	31.100	176.180
36	18	Dale Jarrett	Joe Gibbs Racing	Chevrolet	31.112	176.112
37	1	Rick Mast	Precision Products Racing	Ford	31.114	176.101
38	71	Dave Marcis	Marcis Auto Racing	Chevrolet	31.118	176.078
39	23	Hut Stricklin	Travis Carter Enterprises	Ford	31.121	176.061
40	17	Darrell Waltrip	Darrell Waltrip Motorsports	Chevrolet	31.135	175.982
Provisionals
41	55	Jimmy Hensley	RaDiUs Motorsports	Ford	-*	-*
42	90	Mike Wallace (R)	Donlavey Racing	Ford	-*	-*
Failed to qualify
43	43	Wally Dallenbach Jr.	Petty Enterprises	Pontiac	-*	-*
44	61	Rick Carelli	Chesrown Racing	Chevrolet	-*	-*
45	20	Buddy Baker	Moroso Racing	Ford	-*	-*
46	47	Billy Standridge (R)	Johnson Standridge Racing	Ford	-*	-*
47	89	Jim Sauter	Mueller Brothers Racing	Ford	-*	-*
48	80	Jimmy Horton	Hover Motorsports	Ford	-*	-*
49	99	Danny Sullivan	Virtue Racing	Chevrolet	-*	-*
50	95	Jeremy Mayfield (R)	Sadler Brothers Racing	Ford	-*	-*
Official first round qualifying results
Official starting lineup

== Race results ==
Fin	St	#	Driver	Team	Make	Laps	Led	Status	Pts	Winnings
1	7	28	Ernie Irvan	Robert Yates Racing	Ford	328	207	running	185	$86,100
2	14	21	Morgan Shepherd	Wood Brothers Racing	Ford	328	1	running	175	$48,300
3	40	17	Darrell Waltrip	Darrell Waltrip Motorsports	Chevrolet	328	14	running	170	$44,450
4	13	8	Jeff Burton (R)	Stavola Brothers Racing	Ford	328	87	running	165	$32,600
5	4	6	Mark Martin	Roush Racing	Ford	327	0	running	155	$30,300
6	34	15	Lake Speed	Bud Moore Engineering	Ford	327	0	running	150	$24,850
7	10	77	Greg Sacks	U.S. Motorsports Inc.	Ford	327	0	running	146	$14,050
8	17	24	Jeff Gordon	Hendrick Motorsports	Chevrolet	326	0	running	142	$21,550
9	22	10	Ricky Rudd	Rudd Performance Motorsports	Ford	326	0	running	138	$12,350
10	25	27	Jimmy Spencer	Junior Johnson & Associates	Ford	326	0	running	134	$17,500
11	35	16	Ted Musgrave	Roush Racing	Ford	326	0	running	130	$18,520
12	16	3	Dale Earnhardt	Richard Childress Racing	Chevrolet	325	0	running	127	$24,550
13	27	42	Kyle Petty	SABCO Racing	Pontiac	325	0	running	124	$21,580
14	3	5	Terry Labonte	Hendrick Motorsports	Chevrolet	325	9	running	126	$21,360
15	30	22	Bobby Labonte	Bill Davis Racing	Pontiac	325	0	running	118	$17,880
16	24	25	Ken Schrader	Hendrick Motorsports	Chevrolet	325	0	running	115	$17,270
17	39	23	Hut Stricklin	Travis Carter Enterprises	Ford	325	0	running	112	$10,060
18	5	41	Joe Nemechek (R)	Larry Hedrick Motorsports	Chevrolet	324	0	running	109	$13,440
19	33	40	Bobby Hamilton	SABCO Racing	Pontiac	322	0	running	106	$16,630
20	31	29	Steve Grissom (R)	Diamond Ridge Motorsports	Chevrolet	321	0	running	103	$10,310
21	28	51	Jeff Purvis	Phoenix Racing	Chevrolet	321	0	running	100	$9,600
22	1	19	Loy Allen Jr. (R)	TriStar Motorsports	Ford	321	0	running	97	$18,240
23	32	30	Michael Waltrip	Bahari Racing	Pontiac	321	0	running	94	$16,030
24	12	2	Rusty Wallace	Penske Racing South	Ford	320	0	running	91	$21,495
25	23	4	Sterling Marlin	Morgan–McClure Motorsports	Chevrolet	318	0	running	88	$19,190
26	37	1	Rick Mast	Precision Products Racing	Ford	314	0	running	85	$11,635
27	42	90	Mike Wallace (R)	Donlavey Racing	Ford	314	0	running	82	$11,425
28	20	32	Dick Trickle	Active Motorsports	Chevrolet	311	0	rear end	79	$8,955
29	41	55	Jimmy Hensley	RaDiUs Motorsports	Ford	292	0	running	76	$11,140
30	11	33	Harry Gant	Leo Jackson Motorsports	Chevrolet	288	0	running	73	$14,905
31	15	26	Brett Bodine	King Racing	Ford	287	0	running	70	$14,745
32	21	11	Bill Elliott	Junior Johnson & Associates	Ford	284	0	engine	67	$14,585
33	19	75	Todd Bodine	Butch Mock Motorsports	Ford	284	0	engine	64	$10,490
34	29	98	Derrike Cope	Cale Yarborough Motorsports	Ford	215	0	crash	61	$9,955
35	36	18	Dale Jarrett	Joe Gibbs Racing	Chevrolet	205	2	engine	63	$19,820
36	38	71	Dave Marcis	Marcis Auto Racing	Chevrolet	122	0	engine	55	$10,380
37	6	9	Rich Bickle (R)	Melling Racing	Ford	101	0	engine	52	$8,365
38	2	7	Geoff Bodine	Geoff Bodine Racing	Ford	73	8	engine	54	$14,150
39	18	02	Curtis Markham	Taylor Racing	Ford	32	0	crash	46	$8,325
40	8	31	Ward Burton (R)	A.G. Dillard Motorsports	Chevrolet	24	0	engine	43	$8,285
41	9	12	Chuck Bown	Bobby Allison Motorsports	Ford	6	0	engine	40	$12,285
42	26	14	John Andretti (R)	Hagan Racing	Chevrolet	5	0	crash	37	$12,785
Official race results

== Standings after the race ==
Drivers' Championship standings

	Pos	Driver	Points
	1	Ernie Irvan	705
2	2	Mark Martin	604 (-101)
1	3	Dale Earnhardt	594 (-111)
5	4	Morgan Shepherd	571 (–132)
	5	Terry Labonte	551 (–154)
3	6	Sterling Marlin	549 (–156)
	7	Jeff Gordon	544 (–161)
3	8	Ricky Rudd	519 (–186)
3	9	Ken Schrader	517 (–188)
4	10	Lake Speed	492 (–213)
Official driver's standings

- Note: Only the first 10 positions are included for the driver standings.

Previous race: 1994 Pontiac Excitement 400	NASCAR Winston Cup Series; 1994 season	Next race: 1994 TranSouth Financial 400
