= 1994 Goodwrench 500 =

Second race of the 1994 NASCAR Winston Cup Series

Race details
- Race 2 of 31 in the 1994 NASCAR Winston Cup Series
- The 1994 Goodwrench 500 program cover, featuring Dale Earnhardt.
- Date: February 27, 1994
- Official name: 29th Annual Goodwrench 500
- Location: Rockingham, North Carolina, North Carolina Speedway
- Course: Permanent racing facility
- Course length: 1.017 miles (1.637 km)
- Distance: 492 laps, 500.364 mi (805.257 km)
- Scheduled distance: 492 laps, 500.364 mi (805.257 km)
- Average speed: 125.239 miles per hour (201.553 km/h)
- Attendance: 45,000

Pole position
Driver	Geoff Bodine	Geoff Bodine Racing
- Time: 24.132

Most laps led
Driver	Rusty Wallace	Penske Racing South
- Laps: 347

Winner
No. 2	Rusty Wallace	Penske Racing South

Television in the United States
- Network: TNN
- Announcers: Mike Joy, Buddy Baker, Glenn Jarrett

Radio in the United States
- Radio: Motor Racing Network

The 1994 Goodwrench 500 was the second stock car race of the 1994 NASCAR Winston Cup Series season and the 29th iteration of the event. The race was held on Sunday, February 27, 1994, in Rockingham, North Carolina, at North Carolina Speedway, a 1.017 miles (1.637 km) permanent high-banked racetrack. The race took the scheduled 492 laps to complete. At race's end, Penske Racing South driver Rusty Wallace would manage to dominate the majority of the race to take his 32nd career NASCAR Winston Cup Series victory and his first victory of the season. To fill out the top three, Morgan–McClure Motorsports driver Sterling Marlin and Precision Products Racing driver Rick Mast would finish second and third, respectively.

== Background ==
The layout of North Carolina Speedway, the venue where the race was held.

North Carolina Speedway is a 1 mile (1.6 km) flat oval track in Rockingham, North Carolina. The track has held a variety of events since its opening in 1965, including the NASCAR Nextel Cup Series from 1965 to 2004, and currently the NASCAR O'Reilly Auto Parts Series and Truck Series.

=== Entry list ===
- (R) denotes rookie driver.

#	Driver	Team	Make
1	Rick Mast	Precision Products Racing	Ford
2	Rusty Wallace	Penske Racing South	Ford
02	T. W. Taylor	Taylor Racing	Ford
3	Dale Earnhardt	Richard Childress Racing	Chevrolet
4	Sterling Marlin	Morgan–McClure Motorsports	Chevrolet
5	Terry Labonte	Hendrick Motorsports	Chevrolet
6	Mark Martin	Roush Racing	Ford
7	Geoff Bodine	Geoff Bodine Racing	Ford
8	Jeff Burton (R)	Stavola Brothers Racing	Ford
9	Rich Bickle (R)	Melling Racing	Ford
10	Ricky Rudd	Rudd Performance Motorsports	Ford
11	Bill Elliott	Junior Johnson & Associates	Ford
12	Chuck Bown	Bobby Allison Motorsports	Ford
14	John Andretti (R)	Hagan Racing	Chevrolet
15	Lake Speed	Bud Moore Engineering	Ford
16	Ted Musgrave	Roush Racing	Ford
17	Darrell Waltrip	Darrell Waltrip Motorsports	Chevrolet
18	Dale Jarrett	Joe Gibbs Racing	Chevrolet
19	Loy Allen Jr. (R)	TriStar Motorsports	Ford
21	Morgan Shepherd	Wood Brothers Racing	Ford
22	Bobby Labonte	Bill Davis Racing	Pontiac
23	Hut Stricklin	Travis Carter Enterprises	Ford
24	Jeff Gordon	Hendrick Motorsports	Chevrolet
25	Ken Schrader	Hendrick Motorsports	Chevrolet
26	Brett Bodine	King Racing	Ford
27	Jimmy Spencer	Junior Johnson & Associates	Ford
28	Ernie Irvan	Robert Yates Racing	Ford
29	Steve Grissom	Diamond Ridge Motorsports	Chevrolet
30	Michael Waltrip	Bahari Racing	Pontiac
31	Ward Burton	A.G. Dillard Motorsports	Chevrolet
32	Dick Trickle	Active Motorsports	Chevrolet
33	Harry Gant	Leo Jackson Motorsports	Chevrolet
40	Bobby Hamilton	SABCO Racing	Pontiac
41	Joe Nemechek (R)	Larry Hedrick Motorsports	Chevrolet
42	Kyle Petty	SABCO Racing	Pontiac
43	Wally Dallenbach Jr.	Petty Enterprises	Pontiac
47	Billy Standridge (R)	Johnson Standridge Racing	Ford
48	James Hylton	Hylton Motorsports	Pontiac
52	Mike Skinner	Jimmy Means Racing	Ford
55	Jimmy Hensley	RaDiUs Motorsports	Ford
56	Jerry Hill	Hill Motorsports	Chevrolet
61	Rick Carelli	Chesrown Racing	Chevrolet
71	Dave Marcis	Marcis Auto Racing	Chevrolet
75	Todd Bodine	Butch Mock Motorsports	Ford
77	Greg Sacks	Jasper Motorsports	Ford
90	Bobby Hillin Jr.	Donlavey Racing	Ford
95	Jeremy Mayfield (R)	Sadler Brothers Racing	Ford
98	Derrike Cope	Cale Yarborough Motorsports	Ford
99	Danny Sullivan	SABCO Racing	Pontiac

== Qualifying ==
Qualifying was split into two rounds. The first round was held on Friday, February 25, at 2:30 PM EST. Each driver would have one lap to set a time. During the first round, the top 20 drivers in the round would be guaranteed a starting spot in the race. If a driver was not able to guarantee a spot in the first round, they had the option to scrub their time from the first round and try and run a faster lap time in a second round qualifying run, held on Saturday, February 26, at 11:30 AM EST. As with the first round, each driver would have one lap to set a time. For this specific race, positions 21-40 would be decided on time, and depending on who needed it, a select amount of positions were given to cars who had not otherwise qualified but were high enough in owner's points; up to two provisionals were given. If needed, a past champion who did not qualify on either time or provisionals could use a champion's provisional, adding one more spot to the field.

Geoff Bodine, driving for his own Geoff Bodine Racing team, won the pole, setting a time of 24.132 and an average speed of 151.716 mph (244.163 km/h) in the first round.

Seven drivers would fail to qualify.

=== Full qualifying results ===
Pos.	#	Driver	Team	Make	Time	Speed
1	7	Geoff Bodine	Geoff Bodine Racing	Ford	24.132	151.716
2	6	Mark Martin	Roush Racing	Ford	24.149	151.609
3	24	Jeff Gordon	Hendrick Motorsports	Chevrolet	24.186	151.377
4	26	Brett Bodine	King Racing	Ford	24.236	151.065
5	16	Ted Musgrave	Roush Racing	Ford	24.255	150.946
6	28	Ernie Irvan	Robert Yates Racing	Ford	24.298	150.679
7	42	Kyle Petty	SABCO Racing	Pontiac	24.314	150.580
8	11	Bill Elliott	Junior Johnson & Associates	Ford	24.337	150.438
9	17	Darrell Waltrip	Darrell Waltrip Motorsports	Chevrolet	24.384	150.148
10	40	Bobby Hamilton	SABCO Racing	Pontiac	24.399	150.055
11	21	Morgan Shepherd	Wood Brothers Racing	Ford	24.403	150.031
12	29	Steve Grissom (R)	Diamond Ridge Motorsports	Chevrolet	24.406	150.012
13	25	Ken Schrader	Hendrick Motorsports	Chevrolet	24.419	149.932
14	75	Todd Bodine	Butch Mock Motorsports	Ford	24.419	149.932
15	2	Rusty Wallace	Penske Racing South	Ford	24.440	149.804
16	1	Rick Mast	Precision Products Racing	Ford	24.447	149.761
17	33	Harry Gant	Leo Jackson Motorsports	Chevrolet	24.469	149.626
18	90	Bobby Hillin Jr.	Donlavey Racing	Ford	24.488	149.510
19	3	Dale Earnhardt	Richard Childress Racing	Chevrolet	24.510	149.376
20	22	Bobby Labonte	Bill Davis Racing	Pontiac	24.512	149.364
Failed to lock in Round 1
21	4	Sterling Marlin	Morgan–McClure Motorsports	Chevrolet	24.528	149.266
22	43	Wally Dallenbach Jr.	Petty Enterprises	Pontiac	24.529	149.260
23	41	Joe Nemechek (R)	Larry Hedrick Motorsports	Chevrolet	24.567	149.029
24	23	Hut Stricklin	Travis Carter Enterprises	Ford	24.567	149.029
25	12	Chuck Bown	Bobby Allison Motorsports	Ford	24.569	149.017
26	27	Jimmy Spencer	Junior Johnson & Associates	Ford	24.573	148.993
27	5	Terry Labonte	Hendrick Motorsports	Chevrolet	24.574	148.987
28	47	Billy Standridge (R)	Johnson Standridge Racing	Ford	24.590	148.890
29	32	Dick Trickle	Active Motorsports	Chevrolet	24.599	148.835
30	77	Greg Sacks	U.S. Motorsports Inc.	Ford	24.614	148.745
31	30	Michael Waltrip	Bahari Racing	Pontiac	24.640	148.588
32	98	Derrike Cope	Cale Yarborough Motorsports	Ford	24.641	148.582
33	55	Jimmy Hensley	RaDiUs Motorsports	Ford	24.650	148.527
34	10	Ricky Rudd	Rudd Performance Motorsports	Ford	24.651	148.521
35	14	John Andretti (R)	Hagan Racing	Chevrolet	24.658	148.479
36	9	Rich Bickle (R)	Melling Racing	Ford	24.686	148.311
37	15	Lake Speed	Bud Moore Engineering	Ford	24.709	148.173
38	52	Mike Skinner	Jimmy Means Racing	Ford	24.763	147.850
39	8	Jeff Burton (R)	Stavola Brothers Racing	Ford	24.788	147.701
40	71	Dave Marcis	Marcis Auto Racing	Chevrolet	24.801	147.623
Provisionals
41	18	Dale Jarrett	Joe Gibbs Racing	Chevrolet	-*	-*
42	19	Loy Allen Jr. (R)	TriStar Motorsports	Ford	-*	-*
Failed to qualify
43	31	Ward Burton (R)	A.G. Dillard Motorsports	Chevrolet	-*	-*
44	48	James Hylton	Hylton Motorsports	Pontiac	-*	-*
45	99	Danny Sullivan	SABCO Racing	Pontiac	-*	-*
46	61	Rick Carelli	Chesrown Racing	Chevrolet	-*	-*
47	95	Jeremy Mayfield (R)	Sadler Brothers Racing	Ford	-*	-*
48	56	Jerry Hill	Hill Motorsports	Chevrolet	-*	-*
49	02	T. W. Taylor	Taylor Racing	Ford	-*	-*
Official first round qualifying results
Official starting lineup

== Race results ==
Fin	St	#	Driver	Team	Make	Laps	Led	Status	Pts	Winnings
1	15	2	Rusty Wallace	Penske Racing South	Ford	492	347	running	185	$52,885
2	21	4	Sterling Marlin	Morgan–McClure Motorsports	Chevrolet	492	54	running	175	$48,935
3	16	1	Rick Mast	Precision Products Racing	Ford	492	0	running	165	$36,085
4	2	6	Mark Martin	Roush Racing	Ford	491	62	running	165	$28,986
5	6	28	Ernie Irvan	Robert Yates Racing	Ford	491	0	running	155	$26,410
6	4	26	Brett Bodine	King Racing	Ford	491	2	running	155	$20,535
7	19	3	Dale Earnhardt	Richard Childress Racing	Chevrolet	491	16	running	151	$25,785
8	7	42	Kyle Petty	SABCO Racing	Pontiac	490	6	running	147	$22,635
9	13	25	Ken Schrader	Hendrick Motorsports	Chevrolet	489	0	running	138	$18,935
10	31	30	Michael Waltrip	Bahari Racing	Pontiac	489	0	running	134	$19,410
11	34	10	Ricky Rudd	Rudd Performance Motorsports	Ford	489	0	running	130	$12,885
12	26	27	Jimmy Spencer	Junior Johnson & Associates	Ford	489	0	running	127	$13,735
13	5	16	Ted Musgrave	Roush Racing	Ford	488	0	running	124	$17,435
14	29	32	Dick Trickle	Active Motorsports	Chevrolet	488	0	running	121	$10,035
15	1	7	Geoff Bodine	Geoff Bodine Racing	Ford	487	4	running	123	$22,685
16	11	21	Morgan Shepherd	Wood Brothers Racing	Ford	486	1	running	120	$19,635
17	27	5	Terry Labonte	Hendrick Motorsports	Chevrolet	486	0	running	112	$19,435
18	41	18	Dale Jarrett	Joe Gibbs Racing	Chevrolet	485	0	running	109	$20,635
19	20	22	Bobby Labonte	Bill Davis Racing	Pontiac	484	0	running	106	$15,985
20	39	8	Jeff Burton (R)	Stavola Brothers Racing	Ford	484	0	running	103	$17,285
21	37	15	Lake Speed	Bud Moore Engineering	Ford	484	0	running	100	$18,610
22	33	55	Jimmy Hensley	RaDiUs Motorsports	Ford	484	0	running	97	$11,185
23	9	17	Darrell Waltrip	Darrell Waltrip Motorsports	Chevrolet	483	0	running	94	$14,935
24	35	14	John Andretti (R)	Hagan Racing	Chevrolet	480	0	running	91	$15,285
25	25	12	Chuck Bown	Bobby Allison Motorsports	Ford	480	0	running	88	$14,535
26	24	23	Hut Stricklin	Travis Carter Enterprises	Ford	478	0	running	85	$8,025
27	22	43	Wally Dallenbach Jr.	Petty Enterprises	Pontiac	478	0	running	82	$10,225
28	30	77	Greg Sacks	U.S. Motorsports Inc.	Ford	477	0	running	79	$7,875
29	32	98	Derrike Cope	Cale Yarborough Motorsports	Ford	477	0	running	76	$9,900
30	12	29	Steve Grissom (R)	Diamond Ridge Motorsports	Chevrolet	475	0	running	73	$7,650
31	38	52	Mike Skinner	Jimmy Means Racing	Ford	469	0	running	70	$9,550
32	3	24	Jeff Gordon	Hendrick Motorsports	Chevrolet	462	0	crash	67	$13,500
33	18	90	Bobby Hillin Jr.	Donlavey Racing	Ford	456	0	running	64	$9,250
34	14	75	Todd Bodine	Butch Mock Motorsports	Ford	427	0	running	61	$8,700
35	40	71	Dave Marcis	Marcis Auto Racing	Chevrolet	418	0	valve	58	$7,100
36	23	41	Joe Nemechek (R)	Larry Hedrick Motorsports	Chevrolet	396	0	crash	55	$7,025
37	17	33	Harry Gant	Leo Jackson Motorsports	Chevrolet	376	0	running	52	$10,975
38	10	40	Bobby Hamilton	SABCO Racing	Pontiac	358	0	crash	49	$10,960
39	8	11	Bill Elliott	Junior Johnson & Associates	Ford	336	0	running	46	$11,925
40	42	19	Loy Allen Jr. (R)	TriStar Motorsports	Ford	228	0	crash	43	$6,900
41	36	9	Rich Bickle (R)	Melling Racing	Ford	122	0	engine	40	$6,900
42	28	47	Billy Standridge (R)	Johnson Standridge Racing	Ford	55	0	crash	37	$7,400
Official race results

== Standings after the race ==
Drivers' Championship standings

	Pos	Driver	Points
	1	Sterling Marlin	355
	2	Ernie Irvan	335 (-20)
3	3	Dale Earnhardt	302 (-53)
	4	Mark Martin	294 (–61)
	5	Terry Labonte	282 (–73)
1	6	Morgan Shepherd	280 (–75)
1	7	Ricky Rudd	272 (–83)
3	8	Ken Schrader	272 (–83)
1	9	Geoff Bodine	258 (–97)
	10	Rick Mast	247 (–108)
Official driver's standings

- Note: Only the first 10 positions are included for the driver standings.

Previous race: 1994 Daytona 500	NASCAR Winston Cup Series; 1994 season	Next race: 1994 Pontiac Excitement 400
