= 1994 TranSouth Financial 400 =

Fifth race of the 1994 NASCAR Winston Cup Series

Race details
- Race 5 of 31 in the 1994 NASCAR Winston Cup Series
- The 1994 TranSouth Financial 400 program cover, featuring Dale Earnhardt.
- Date: March 27, 1994
- Official name: 38th Annual TranSouth Financial 400
- Location: Darlington, South Carolina, Darlington Raceway
- Course: Permanent racing facility
- Course length: 1.366 miles (2.198 km)
- Distance: 293 laps, 400.238 mi (644.12 km)
- Scheduled distance: 293 laps, 400.238 mi (644.12 km)
- Average speed: 132.432 miles per hour (213.129 km/h)

Pole position
Driver	Bill Elliott	Junior Johnson & Associates
- Time: 29.704

Most laps led
Driver	Dale Earnhardt	Richard Childress Racing
- Laps: 166

Winner
No. 3	Dale Earnhardt	Richard Childress Racing

Television in the United States
- Network: ESPN
- Announcers: Bob Jenkins, Ned Jarrett, Benny Parsons

Radio in the United States
- Radio: Motor Racing Network

The 1994 TranSouth Financial 400 was the fifth stock car race of the 1994 NASCAR Winston Cup Series season and the 38th iteration of the event. The race was held on Sunday, March 27, 1994, in Darlington, South Carolina, at Darlington Raceway, a 1.366 miles (2.198 km) permanent egg-shaped oval racetrack. The race took the scheduled 293 laps to complete. At race's end, Richard Childress Racing driver Dale Earnhardt would manage to dominate the majority of the race to take his 60th career NASCAR Winston Cup Series victory and his first victory of the season. To fill out the top three, Roush Racing driver Mark Martin and Junior Johnson driver Bill Elliott would finish in the respective positions.

== Background ==
The layout of Darlington Raceway, the venue where the race was held.

Darlington Raceway is a race track built for NASCAR racing located near Darlington, South Carolina. It is nicknamed "The Lady in Black" and "The Track Too Tough to Tame" by many NASCAR fans and drivers and advertised as "A NASCAR Tradition." It is of a unique, somewhat egg-shaped design, an oval with the ends of very different configurations, a condition which supposedly arose from the proximity of one end of the track to a minnow pond the owner refused to relocate. This situation makes it very challenging for the crews to set up their cars' handling in a way that is effective at both ends.

=== Entry list ===
- (R) denotes rookie driver.

#	Driver	Team	Make
1	Rick Mast	Precision Products Racing	Ford
2	Rusty Wallace	Penske Racing South	Ford
02	Curtis Markham	Taylor Racing	Ford
3	Dale Earnhardt	Richard Childress Racing	Chevrolet
4	Sterling Marlin	Morgan–McClure Motorsports	Chevrolet
5	Terry Labonte	Hendrick Motorsports	Chevrolet
6	Mark Martin	Roush Racing	Ford
7	Geoff Bodine	Geoff Bodine Racing	Ford
8	Jeff Burton	Stavola Brothers Racing	Ford
9	Rich Bickle (R)	Melling Racing	Ford
10	Ricky Rudd	Rudd Performance Motorsports	Ford
11	Bill Elliott	Junior Johnson & Associates	Ford
12	Chuck Bown	Bobby Allison Motorsports	Ford
14	John Andretti (R)	Hagan Racing	Chevrolet
15	Lake Speed	Bud Moore Engineering	Ford
16	Ted Musgrave	Roush Racing	Ford
17	Darrell Waltrip	Darrell Waltrip Motorsports	Chevrolet
18	Dale Jarrett	Joe Gibbs Racing	Chevrolet
19	Loy Allen Jr. (R)	TriStar Motorsports	Ford
21	Morgan Shepherd	Wood Brothers Racing	Ford
22	Bobby Labonte	Bill Davis Racing	Pontiac
23	Hut Stricklin	Travis Carter Enterprises	Ford
24	Jeff Gordon	Hendrick Motorsports	Chevrolet
25	Ken Schrader	Hendrick Motorsports	Chevrolet
26	Brett Bodine	King Racing	Ford
27	Jimmy Spencer	Junior Johnson & Associates	Ford
28	Ernie Irvan	Robert Yates Racing	Ford
29	Steve Grissom	Diamond Ridge Motorsports	Chevrolet
30	Michael Waltrip	Bahari Racing	Pontiac
31	Ward Burton	A.G. Dillard Motorsports	Chevrolet
32	Dick Trickle	Active Motorsports	Chevrolet
33	Harry Gant	Leo Jackson Motorsports	Chevrolet
36	H. B. Bailey	Bailey Racing	Pontiac
40	Bobby Hamilton	SABCO Racing	Pontiac
41	Joe Nemechek (R)	Larry Hedrick Motorsports	Chevrolet
42	Kyle Petty	SABCO Racing	Pontiac
43	Wally Dallenbach Jr.	Petty Enterprises	Pontiac
47	Billy Standridge (R)	Johnson Standridge Racing	Ford
52	Brad Teague	Jimmy Means Racing	Ford
55	Jimmy Hensley	RaDiUs Motorsports	Ford
57	Bob Schacht	Balough Racing	Ford
59	Andy Belmont	Andy Belmont Racing	Ford
61	Rick Carelli	Chesrown Racing	Chevrolet
71	Dave Marcis	Marcis Auto Racing	Chevrolet
75	Todd Bodine	Butch Mock Motorsports	Ford
77	Greg Sacks	U.S. Motorsports Inc.	Ford
84	Norm Benning	Norm Benning Racing	Oldsmobile
90	Mike Wallace (R)	Donlavey Racing	Ford
98	Derrike Cope	Cale Yarborough Motorsports	Ford

== Qualifying ==
Qualifying was split into two rounds. The first round was held on Friday, March 4, at 11:30 AM EST. Each driver would have one lap to set a time. During the first round, the top 20 drivers in the round would be guaranteed a starting spot in the race. If a driver was not able to guarantee a spot in the first round, they had the option to scrub their time from the first round and try and run a faster lap time in a second round qualifying run, held on Saturday, March 5, at 12:15 PM EST. As with the first round, each driver would have one lap to set a time. For this specific race, positions 21-40 would be decided on time, and depending on who needed it, a select amount of positions were given to cars who had not otherwise qualified but were high enough in owner's points; which was usually two. If needed, a past champion who did not qualify on either time or provisionals could use a champion's provisional, adding one more spot to the field.

Bill Elliott, driving for Junior Johnson & Associates, won the pole, setting a time of 29.704 and an average speed of 165.553 mph (266.432 km/h) in the first round.

Eight drivers would fail to qualify.

=== Full qualifying results ===
Pos.	#	Driver	Team	Make	Time	Speed
1	11	Bill Elliott	Junior Johnson & Associates	Ford	29.704	165.553
2	4	Sterling Marlin	Morgan–McClure Motorsports	Chevrolet	29.751	165.292
3	6	Mark Martin	Roush Racing	Ford	29.758	165.253
4	12	Chuck Bown	Bobby Allison Motorsports	Ford	29.798	165.031
5	26	Brett Bodine	King Racing	Ford	29.810	164.965
6	25	Ken Schrader	Hendrick Motorsports	Chevrolet	29.811	164.959
7	7	Geoff Bodine	Geoff Bodine Racing	Ford	29.863	164.672
8	2	Rusty Wallace	Penske Racing South	Ford	29.894	164.501
9	3	Dale Earnhardt	Richard Childress Racing	Chevrolet	29.898	164.479
10	1	Rick Mast	Precision Products Racing	Ford	29.909	164.419
11	28	Ernie Irvan	Robert Yates Racing	Ford	29.944	164.227
12	98	Derrike Cope	Cale Yarborough Motorsports	Ford	29.947	164.210
13	24	Jeff Gordon	Hendrick Motorsports	Chevrolet	30.016	163.833
14	18	Dale Jarrett	Joe Gibbs Racing	Chevrolet	30.017	163.827
15	23	Hut Stricklin	Travis Carter Enterprises	Ford	30.022	163.800
16	22	Bobby Labonte	Bill Davis Racing	Pontiac	30.043	163.685
17	21	Morgan Shepherd	Wood Brothers Racing	Ford	30.046	163.669
18	14	John Andretti (R)	Hagan Racing	Chevrolet	30.054	163.625
19	55	Jimmy Hensley	RaDiUs Motorsports	Ford	30.064	163.571
20	16	Ted Musgrave	Roush Racing	Ford	30.083	163.468
Failed to lock in Round 1
21	33	Harry Gant	Leo Jackson Motorsports	Chevrolet	30.085	163.457
22	8	Jeff Burton (R)	Stavola Brothers Racing	Ford	30.102	163.365
23	90	Mike Wallace (R)	Donlavey Racing	Ford	30.103	163.359
24	5	Terry Labonte	Hendrick Motorsports	Chevrolet	30.105	163.348
25	10	Ricky Rudd	Rudd Performance Motorsports	Ford	30.105	163.348
26	71	Dave Marcis	Marcis Auto Racing	Chevrolet	30.138	163.169
27	27	Jimmy Spencer	Junior Johnson & Associates	Ford	30.163	163.034
28	29	Steve Grissom	Diamond Ridge Motorsports	Chevrolet	30.212	162.770
29	41	Joe Nemechek (R)	Larry Hedrick Motorsports	Chevrolet	30.235	162.646
30	30	Michael Waltrip	Bahari Racing	Pontiac	30.310	162.243
31	9	Rich Bickle	Melling Racing	Ford	30.310	162.243
32	40	Bobby Hamilton	SABCO Racing	Pontiac	30.335	162.110
33	42	Kyle Petty	SABCO Racing	Pontiac	30.337	162.099
34	52	Brad Teague	Jimmy Means Racing	Ford	30.340	162.083
35	15	Lake Speed	Bud Moore Engineering	Ford	30.349	162.035
36	17	Darrell Waltrip	Darrell Waltrip Motorsports	Chevrolet	30.359	161.982
37	43	Wally Dallenbach Jr.	Petty Enterprises	Pontiac	30.379	161.875
38	31	Ward Burton	A.G. Dillard Motorsports	Chevrolet	30.404	161.742
39	32	Dick Trickle	Active Motorsports	Chevrolet	30.448	161.508
40	77	Greg Sacks	U.S. Motorsports Inc.	Ford	30.530	161.074
Provisional
41	75	Todd Bodine	Butch Mock Motorsports	Ford	-*	-*
Failed to qualify
42	19	Loy Allen Jr. (R)	TriStar Motorsports	Ford	-*	-*
43	61	Rick Carelli	Chesrown Racing	Chevrolet	-*	-*
44	47	Billy Standridge (R)	Johnson Standridge Racing	Ford	-*	-*
45	02	Curtis Markham	Taylor Racing	Ford	-*	-*
46	57	Bob Schacht	Balough Racing	Ford	-*	-*
47	84	Norm Benning	Norm Benning Racing	Oldsmobile	-*	-*
48	36	H. B. Bailey	Bailey Racing	Pontiac	-*	-*
49	59	Andy Belmont	Andy Belmont Racing	Ford	-*	-*
Official first round qualifying results
Official starting lineup

== Race results ==
Fin	St	#	Driver	Team	Make	Laps	Led	Status	Pts	Winnings
1	9	3	Dale Earnhardt	Richard Childress Racing	Chevrolet	293	166	running	185	$70,190
2	3	6	Mark Martin	Roush Racing	Ford	293	7	running	175	$47,835
3	1	11	Bill Elliott	Junior Johnson & Associates	Ford	293	5	running	170	$35,285
4	14	18	Dale Jarrett	Joe Gibbs Racing	Chevrolet	293	9	running	165	$27,550
5	35	15	Lake Speed	Bud Moore Engineering	Ford	293	0	running	155	$26,300
6	11	28	Ernie Irvan	Robert Yates Racing	Ford	293	24	running	155	$22,875
7	6	25	Ken Schrader	Hendrick Motorsports	Chevrolet	293	4	running	151	$18,395
8	21	33	Harry Gant	Leo Jackson Motorsports	Chevrolet	292	0	running	142	$17,265
9	25	10	Ricky Rudd	Rudd Performance Motorsports	Ford	292	0	running	138	$9,260
10	20	16	Ted Musgrave	Roush Racing	Ford	292	0	running	134	$18,405
11	33	42	Kyle Petty	SABCO Racing	Pontiac	291	0	running	130	$19,400
12	4	12	Chuck Bown	Bobby Allison Motorsports	Ford	291	0	running	127	$15,470
13	19	55	Jimmy Hensley	RaDiUs Motorsports	Ford	291	0	running	124	$11,185
14	28	29	Steve Grissom	Diamond Ridge Motorsports	Chevrolet	291	0	running	121	$9,280
15	30	30	Michael Waltrip	Bahari Racing	Pontiac	290	0	running	118	$15,025
16	12	98	Derrike Cope	Cale Yarborough Motorsports	Ford	290	0	running	115	$10,405
17	15	23	Hut Stricklin	Travis Carter Enterprises	Ford	290	0	running	112	$7,250
18	23	90	Mike Wallace (R)	Donlavey Racing	Ford	290	0	running	109	$10,415
19	29	41	Joe Nemechek (R)	Larry Hedrick Motorsports	Chevrolet	290	0	running	106	$9,670
20	22	8	Jeff Burton (R)	Stavola Brothers Racing	Ford	286	0	running	103	$14,040
21	38	31	Ward Burton	A.G. Dillard Motorsports	Chevrolet	285	0	running	100	$6,670
22	41	75	Todd Bodine	Butch Mock Motorsports	Ford	283	0	running	97	$9,050
23	31	9	Rich Bickle	Melling Racing	Ford	282	0	running	94	$6,430
24	34	52	Brad Teague	Jimmy Means Racing	Ford	279	0	running	91	$9,335
25	32	40	Bobby Hamilton	SABCO Racing	Pontiac	277	0	running	88	$12,490
26	36	17	Darrell Waltrip	Darrell Waltrip Motorsports	Chevrolet	274	0	running	85	$12,275
27	27	27	Jimmy Spencer	Junior Johnson & Associates	Ford	271	0	engine	82	$8,110
28	26	71	Dave Marcis	Marcis Auto Racing	Chevrolet	269	4	running	84	$7,950
29	39	32	Dick Trickle	Active Motorsports	Chevrolet	259	0	running	76	$5,865
30	40	77	Greg Sacks	U.S. Motorsports Inc.	Ford	250	3	running	78	$5,805
31	13	24	Jeff Gordon	Hendrick Motorsports	Chevrolet	236	0	engine	70	$11,745
32	17	21	Morgan Shepherd	Wood Brothers Racing	Ford	235	0	running	67	$15,710
33	8	2	Rusty Wallace	Penske Racing South	Ford	218	56	running	69	$17,850
34	2	4	Sterling Marlin	Morgan–McClure Motorsports	Chevrolet	197	15	engine	66	$16,765
35	24	5	Terry Labonte	Hendrick Motorsports	Chevrolet	195	0	engine	58	$15,580
36	5	26	Brett Bodine	King Racing	Ford	195	0	engine	55	$11,045
37	10	1	Rick Mast	Precision Products Racing	Ford	178	0	engine	52	$9,530
38	18	14	John Andretti (R)	Hagan Racing	Chevrolet	170	0	engine	49	$9,510
39	16	22	Bobby Labonte	Bill Davis Racing	Pontiac	138	0	crash	46	$9,480
40	7	7	Geoff Bodine	Geoff Bodine Racing	Ford	134	0	engine	43	$9,357
41	37	43	Wally Dallenbach Jr.	Petty Enterprises	Pontiac	131	0	engine	40	$5,857
Official race results

== Standings after the race ==
Drivers' Championship standings

	Pos	Driver	Points
	1	Ernie Irvan	860
2	2	Dale Earnhardt	779 (-81)
1	3	Mark Martin	779 (-81)
5	4	Ken Schrader	688 (–192)
3	5	Ricky Rudd	657 (–203)
4	6	Lake Speed	647 (–213)
3	7	Morgan Shepherd	640 (–220)
1	8	Jeff Gordon	615 (–245)
3	9	Sterling Marlin	614 (–246)
5	10	Terry Labonte	609 (–251)
Official driver's standings

- Note: Only the first 10 positions are included for the driver standings.

Previous race: 1994 Purolator 500	NASCAR Winston Cup Series; 1994 season	Next race: 1994 Food City 500
