= Miller 200 =

There have been four races named Miller 200:

- Miller 200 (Rougemont), a NASCAR Busch Series race held at Orange County Speedway in 1984
- Miller 200 (South Boston), a NASCAR Busch Series race held at South Boston Speedway in 1985
- Miller 200 (Martinsville), a NASCAR Busch Series race held at Martinsville Speedway in 1985
- Miller 200 (CART), a CART PPG Indy Car World Series race held at the Mid-Ohio Sports Car Course from 1996 to 1997
