= 1994 Food City 500 =

Sixth race of the 1994 NASCAR Winston Cup Series

Race details
- Race 6 of 31 in the 1994 NASCAR Winston Cup Series
- The 1994 Food City 500 program cover, featuring Jeff Gordon.
- Date: April 10, 1994
- Official name: 34th Annual Food City 500
- Location: Bristol, Tennessee, Bristol Motor Speedway
- Course: Permanent racing facility
- Course length: 0.533 miles (0.858 km)
- Distance: 500 laps, 266.5 mi (428.89 km)
- Scheduled distance: 500 laps, 266.5 mi (428.89 km)
- Average speed: 91.308 miles per hour (146.946 km/h)
- Attendance: 76,000

Pole position
Driver	Chuck Bown	Bobby Allison Motorsports
- Time: 15.357

Most laps led
Driver	Dale Earnhardt	Richard Childress Racing
- Laps: 183

Winner
No. 3	Dale Earnhardt	Richard Childress Racing

Television in the United States
- Network: ESPN
- Announcers: Bob Jenkins, Ned Jarrett, Benny Parsons

Radio in the United States
- Radio: Motor Racing Network

The 1994 Food City 500 was the sixth stock car race of the 1994 NASCAR Winston Cup Series season and the 34th iteration of the event. The race was held on Sunday, April 10, 1994, in Bristol, Tennessee at Bristol Motor Speedway, a 0.533 miles (0.858 km) permanent oval-shaped racetrack. The race took the scheduled 500 laps to complete. At race's end, Richard Childress Racing driver Dale Earnhardt would manage to dominate the late stages of the race to take his 61st career NASCAR Winston Cup Series victory and his second victory of the season. To fill out the top three, Hendrick Motorsports driver Ken Schrader and Bud Moore Engineering driver Lake Speed would finish second and third, respectively.

== Background ==
The layout of Bristol Motor Speedway, the venue where the race was held.

The Bristol Motor Speedway, formerly known as Bristol International Raceway and Bristol Raceway, is a NASCAR short track venue located in Bristol, Tennessee. Constructed in 1960, it held its first NASCAR race on July 30, 1961. Despite its short length, Bristol is among the most popular tracks on the NASCAR schedule because of its distinct features, which include extraordinarily steep banking, an all concrete surface, two pit roads, and stadium-like seating. It has also been named one of the loudest NASCAR tracks.

=== Entry list ===
- (R) denotes rookie driver.

#	Driver	Team	Make
1	Rick Mast	Precision Products Racing	Ford
2	Rusty Wallace	Penske Racing South	Ford
3	Dale Earnhardt	Richard Childress Racing	Chevrolet
4	Sterling Marlin	Morgan–McClure Motorsports	Chevrolet
5	Terry Labonte	Hendrick Motorsports	Chevrolet
6	Mark Martin	Roush Racing	Ford
7	Geoff Bodine	Geoff Bodine Racing	Ford
8	Jeff Burton (R)	Stavola Brothers Racing	Ford
10	Ricky Rudd	Rudd Performance Motorsports	Ford
11	Bill Elliott	Junior Johnson & Associates	Ford
12	Chuck Bown	Bobby Allison Motorsports	Ford
14	John Andretti (R)	Hagan Racing	Chevrolet
15	Lake Speed	Bud Moore Engineering	Ford
16	Ted Musgrave	Roush Racing	Ford
17	Darrell Waltrip	Darrell Waltrip Motorsports	Chevrolet
18	Dale Jarrett	Joe Gibbs Racing	Chevrolet
19	Loy Allen Jr. (R)	TriStar Motorsports	Ford
21	Morgan Shepherd	Wood Brothers Racing	Ford
22	Bobby Labonte	Bill Davis Racing	Pontiac
23	Hut Stricklin	Travis Carter Enterprises	Ford
24	Jeff Gordon	Hendrick Motorsports	Chevrolet
25	Ken Schrader	Hendrick Motorsports	Chevrolet
26	Brett Bodine	King Racing	Ford
27	Jimmy Spencer	Junior Johnson & Associates	Ford
28	Ernie Irvan	Robert Yates Racing	Ford
29	Steve Grissom	Diamond Ridge Motorsports	Chevrolet
30	Michael Waltrip	Bahari Racing	Pontiac
31	Ward Burton	A.G. Dillard Motorsports	Chevrolet
32	Dick Trickle	Active Motorsports	Chevrolet
33	Harry Gant	Leo Jackson Motorsports	Chevrolet
40	Bobby Hamilton	SABCO Racing	Pontiac
41	Joe Nemechek (R)	Larry Hedrick Motorsports	Chevrolet
42	Kyle Petty	SABCO Racing	Pontiac
43	Wally Dallenbach Jr.	Petty Enterprises	Pontiac
52	Brad Teague	Jimmy Means Racing	Ford
55	Jimmy Hensley	RaDiUs Motorsports	Ford
71	Dave Marcis	Marcis Auto Racing	Chevrolet
75	Todd Bodine	Butch Mock Motorsports	Ford
77	Greg Sacks	Jasper Motorsports	Ford
90	Mike Wallace (R)	Donlavey Racing	Ford
95	Jeremy Mayfield (R)	Sadler Brothers Racing	Ford
98	Derrike Cope	Cale Yarborough Motorsports	Ford

== Qualifying ==
Qualifying was split into two rounds. The first round was held on Friday, April 8, at 3:00 PM EST. Each driver would have one lap to set a time. During the first round, the top 20 drivers in the round would be guaranteed a starting spot in the race. If a driver was not able to guarantee a spot in the first round, they had the option to scrub their time from the first round and try and run a faster lap time in a second round qualifying run, held on Saturday, April 9, at 12:30 PM EST. As with the first round, each driver would have one lap to set a time. For this specific race, positions 21-34 would be decided on time, and depending on who needed it, a select amount of positions were given to cars who had not otherwise qualified but were high enough in owner's points; which was usually two. If needed, a past champion who did not qualify on either time or provisionals could use a champion's provisional, adding one more spot to the field.

Chuck Bown, driving for Bobby Allison Motorsports, won the pole, setting a time of 15.357 and an average speed of 124.946 mph (201.081 km/h) in the first round.

Five drivers would fail to qualify.

=== Full qualifying results ===
Pos.	#	Driver	Team	Make	Time	Speed
1	12	Chuck Bown	Bobby Allison Motorsports	Ford	15.357	124.946
2	2	Rusty Wallace	Penske Racing South	Ford	15.364	124.889
3	6	Mark Martin	Roush Racing	Ford	15.369	124.849
4	24	Jeff Gordon	Hendrick Motorsports	Chevrolet	15.389	124.686
5	16	Ted Musgrave	Roush Racing	Ford	15.431	124.347
6	41	Joe Nemechek (R)	Larry Hedrick Motorsports	Chevrolet	15.438	124.291
7	28	Ernie Irvan	Robert Yates Racing	Ford	15.440	124.275
8	75	Todd Bodine	Butch Mock Motorsports	Ford	15.453	124.170
9	22	Bobby Labonte	Bill Davis Racing	Pontiac	15.474	124.002
10	21	Morgan Shepherd	Wood Brothers Racing	Ford	15.481	123.945
11	10	Ricky Rudd	Rudd Performance Motorsports	Ford	15.485	123.913
12	5	Terry Labonte	Hendrick Motorsports	Chevrolet	15.487	123.897
13	15	Lake Speed	Bud Moore Engineering	Ford	15.494	123.841
14	42	Kyle Petty	SABCO Racing	Pontiac	15.509	123.722
15	11	Bill Elliott	Junior Johnson & Associates	Ford	15.514	123.682
16	27	Jimmy Spencer	Junior Johnson & Associates	Ford	15.520	123.634
17	98	Derrike Cope	Cale Yarborough Motorsports	Ford	15.523	123.610
18	4	Sterling Marlin	Morgan–McClure Motorsports	Chevrolet	15.540	123.475
19	26	Brett Bodine	King Racing	Ford	15.548	123.411
20	33	Harry Gant	Leo Jackson Motorsports	Chevrolet	15.552	123.380
Failed to lock in Round 1
21	31	Ward Burton (R)	A.G. Dillard Motorsports	Chevrolet	15.464	124.082
22	25	Ken Schrader	Hendrick Motorsports	Chevrolet	15.564	123.285
23	30	Michael Waltrip	Bahari Racing	Pontiac	15.584	123.126
24	3	Dale Earnhardt	Richard Childress Racing	Chevrolet	15.589	123.087
25	90	Mike Wallace (R)	Donlavey Racing	Ford	15.604	122.968
26	23	Hut Stricklin	Travis Carter Enterprises	Ford	15.610	122.921
27	7	Geoff Bodine	Geoff Bodine Racing	Ford	15.624	122.811
28	1	Rick Mast	Precision Products Racing	Ford	15.634	122.733
29	71	Dave Marcis	Marcis Auto Racing	Chevrolet	15.638	122.701
30	29	Steve Grissom (R)	Diamond Ridge Motorsports	Chevrolet	15.659	122.537
31	77	Greg Sacks	U.S. Motorsports Inc.	Ford	15.666	122.482
32	32	Dick Trickle	Active Motorsports	Chevrolet	15.670	122.451
33	43	Wally Dallenbach Jr.	Petty Enterprises	Pontiac	15.686	122.326
34	40	Bobby Hamilton	SABCO Racing	Pontiac	15.691	122.287
Provisionals
35	8	Jeff Burton (R)	Stavola Brothers Racing	Ford	-*	-*
36	18	Dale Jarrett	Joe Gibbs Racing	Chevrolet	-*	-*
Champion's Provisional
37	17	Darrell Waltrip	Darrell Waltrip Motorsports	Chevrolet	-*	-*
Failed to qualify
38	14	John Andretti (R)	Hagan Racing	Chevrolet	-*	-*
39	55	Jimmy Hensley	RaDiUs Motorsports	Ford	-*	-*
40	19	Loy Allen Jr. (R)	TriStar Motorsports	Ford	-*	-*
41	95	Jeremy Mayfield (R)	Sadler Brothers Racing	Ford	-*	-*
42	52	Brad Teague	Jimmy Means Racing	Ford	-*	-*
Official first round qualifying results
Official starting lineup

== Race results ==
Fin	St	#	Driver	Team	Make	Laps	Led	Status	Pts	Winnings
1	24	3	Dale Earnhardt	Richard Childress Racing	Chevrolet	500	183	running	185	$72,570
2	22	25	Ken Schrader	Hendrick Motorsports	Chevrolet	500	0	running	170	$43,445
3	13	15	Lake Speed	Bud Moore Engineering	Ford	500	0	running	165	$35,020
4	27	7	Geoff Bodine	Geoff Bodine Racing	Ford	499	160	running	165	$24,356
5	23	30	Michael Waltrip	Bahari Racing	Pontiac	497	0	running	155	$20,135
6	9	22	Bobby Labonte	Bill Davis Racing	Pontiac	496	0	running	150	$18,785
7	2	2	Rusty Wallace	Penske Racing South	Ford	494	81	running	151	$23,385
8	18	4	Sterling Marlin	Morgan–McClure Motorsports	Chevrolet	491	0	running	142	$20,285
9	34	40	Bobby Hamilton	SABCO Racing	Pontiac	488	0	running	138	$19,280
10	29	71	Dave Marcis	Marcis Auto Racing	Chevrolet	486	0	running	134	$15,280
11	31	77	Greg Sacks	U.S. Motorsports Inc.	Ford	482	0	running	130	$9,480
12	30	29	Steve Grissom (R)	Diamond Ridge Motorsports	Chevrolet	480	0	running	127	$10,230
13	19	26	Brett Bodine	King Racing	Ford	478	0	running	124	$16,155
14	26	23	Hut Stricklin	Travis Carter Enterprises	Ford	478	0	running	121	$8,905
15	37	17	Darrell Waltrip	Darrell Waltrip Motorsports	Chevrolet	476	0	running	118	$15,755
16	6	41	Joe Nemechek (R)	Larry Hedrick Motorsports	Chevrolet	473	0	running	115	$11,480
17	33	43	Wally Dallenbach Jr.	Petty Enterprises	Pontiac	464	0	running	112	$11,330
18	10	21	Morgan Shepherd	Wood Brothers Racing	Ford	457	0	running	109	$18,580
19	5	16	Ted Musgrave	Roush Racing	Ford	431	0	running	106	$15,170
20	14	42	Kyle Petty	SABCO Racing	Pontiac	426	0	running	103	$19,511
21	3	6	Mark Martin	Roush Racing	Ford	425	8	crash	105	$20,405
22	4	24	Jeff Gordon	Hendrick Motorsports	Chevrolet	425	68	crash	102	$14,855
23	1	12	Chuck Bown	Bobby Allison Motorsports	Ford	393	0	running	94	$19,105
24	12	5	Terry Labonte	Hendrick Motorsports	Chevrolet	373	0	running	91	$18,130
25	21	31	Ward Burton (R)	A.G. Dillard Motorsports	Chevrolet	368	0	running	88	$8,585
26	8	75	Todd Bodine	Butch Mock Motorsports	Ford	358	0	running	85	$10,355
27	17	98	Derrike Cope	Cale Yarborough Motorsports	Ford	276	0	running	82	$10,231
28	25	90	Mike Wallace (R)	Donlavey Racing	Ford	262	0	engine	79	$10,080
29	28	1	Rick Mast	Precision Products Racing	Ford	222	0	crash	76	$9,950
30	15	11	Bill Elliott	Junior Johnson & Associates	Ford	198	0	crash	73	$13,625
31	35	8	Jeff Burton (R)	Stavola Brothers Racing	Ford	197	0	crash	70	$12,625
32	11	10	Ricky Rudd	Rudd Performance Motorsports	Ford	187	0	crash	67	$6,625
33	7	28	Ernie Irvan	Robert Yates Racing	Ford	167	0	engine	64	$18,225
34	32	32	Dick Trickle	Active Motorsports	Chevrolet	164	0	crash	61	$6,625
35	16	27	Jimmy Spencer	Junior Johnson & Associates	Ford	159	0	head gasket	58	$6,625
36	36	18	Dale Jarrett	Joe Gibbs Racing	Chevrolet	66	0	crash	55	$12,025
37	20	33	Harry Gant	Leo Jackson Motorsports	Chevrolet	10	0	crash	52	$10,625
Official race results

== Standings after the race ==
Drivers' Championship standings

	Pos	Driver	Points
1	1	Dale Earnhardt	964
1	2	Ernie Irvan	924 (-40)
	3	Mark Martin	884 (-80)
	4	Ken Schrader	838 (–126)
3	5	Lake Speed	812 (–152)
3	6	Sterling Marlin	757 (–207)
	7	Morgan Shepherd	749 (–215)
3	8	Ricky Rudd	724 (–240)
1	9	Jeff Gordon	716 (–248)
3	10	Rusty Wallace	711 (–253)
Official driver's standings

- Note: Only the first 10 positions are included for the driver standings.

Previous race: 1994 TranSouth Financial 400	NASCAR Winston Cup Series; 1994 season	Next race: 1994 First Union 400
