= 1994 Pontiac Excitement 400 =

Third race of the 1994 NASCAR Winston Cup Series

Race details
- Race 3 of 31 in the 1994 NASCAR Winston Cup Series
- The 1994 Pontiac Excitement 400 program cover. Artwork by Sam Bass.
- Date: March 6, 1994
- Official name: 40th Annual Pontiac Excitement 400
- Location: Richmond, Virginia, Richmond International Raceway
- Course: Permanent racing facility
- Course length: 0.75 miles (1.21 km)
- Distance: 400 laps, 300 mi (482.803 km)
- Scheduled distance: 400 laps, 300 mi (482.803 km)
- Average speed: 98.334 miles per hour (158.253 km/h)

Pole position
Driver	Ted Musgrave	Roush Racing
- Time: 21.867

Most laps led
Driver	Ernie Irvan	Robert Yates Racing
- Laps: 189

Winner
No. 28	Ernie Irvan	Robert Yates Racing

Television in the United States
- Network: TBS
- Announcers: Ken Squier, Dave Marcis, Kenny Wallace

Radio in the United States
- Radio: Motor Racing Network

The 1994 Pontiac Excitement 400 was the third stock car race of the 1994 NASCAR Winston Cup Series season and the 40th iteration of the event. The race was held on Sunday, March 6, 1994, in Richmond, Virginia, at Richmond International Raceway, a 0.75 miles (1.21 km) D-shaped oval. The race took the scheduled 400 laps to complete. On the final restart with 20 to go, Robert Yates Racing driver Ernie Irvan would manage to hold off the field, along with the help of a fast final pit stop to take his 10th career NASCAR Winston Cup Series victory, his first victory of the season, and the overall lead in the driver's championship. To fill out the top three, Penske Racing South driver Rusty Wallace and Hendrick Motorsports driver Jeff Gordon would finish second and third, respectively.

== Background ==
The layout of Richmond International Raceway, the venue where the race was at.

Richmond International Raceway (RIR) is a 3/4-mile (1.2 km), D-shaped, asphalt race track located just outside Richmond, Virginia in Henrico County. It hosts the Monster Energy NASCAR Cup Series and Truck Series. Known as "America's premier short track", it formerly hosted a NASCAR Xfinity Series race, an IndyCar Series race, and two USAC sprint car races.

=== Entry list ===
- (R) denotes rookie driver.

#	Driver	Team	Make
1	Rick Mast	Precision Products Racing	Ford
2	Rusty Wallace	Penske Racing South	Ford
02	T. W. Taylor	Taylor Racing	Ford
3	Dale Earnhardt	Richard Childress Racing	Chevrolet
4	Sterling Marlin	Morgan–McClure Motorsports	Chevrolet
5	Terry Labonte	Hendrick Motorsports	Chevrolet
6	Mark Martin	Roush Racing	Ford
7	Geoff Bodine	Geoff Bodine Racing	Ford
8	Jeff Burton (R)	Stavola Brothers Racing	Ford
10	Ricky Rudd	Rudd Performance Motorsports	Ford
11	Bill Elliott	Junior Johnson & Associates	Ford
12	Chuck Bown	Bobby Allison Motorsports	Ford
14	John Andretti (R)	Hagan Racing	Chevrolet
15	Lake Speed	Bud Moore Engineering	Ford
16	Ted Musgrave	Roush Racing	Ford
17	Darrell Waltrip	Darrell Waltrip Motorsports	Chevrolet
18	Dale Jarrett	Joe Gibbs Racing	Chevrolet
19	Loy Allen Jr. (R)	TriStar Motorsports	Ford
21	Morgan Shepherd	Wood Brothers Racing	Ford
22	Bobby Labonte	Bill Davis Racing	Pontiac
23	Hut Stricklin	Travis Carter Enterprises	Ford
24	Jeff Gordon	Hendrick Motorsports	Chevrolet
25	Ken Schrader	Hendrick Motorsports	Chevrolet
26	Brett Bodine	King Racing	Ford
27	Jimmy Spencer	Junior Johnson & Associates	Ford
28	Ernie Irvan	Robert Yates Racing	Ford
29	Steve Grissom	Diamond Ridge Motorsports	Chevrolet
30	Michael Waltrip	Bahari Racing	Pontiac
31	Ward Burton	A.G. Dillard Motorsports	Chevrolet
32	Dick Trickle	Active Motorsports	Chevrolet
33	Harry Gant	Leo Jackson Motorsports	Chevrolet
40	Bobby Hamilton	SABCO Racing	Pontiac
41	Joe Nemechek (R)	Larry Hedrick Motorsports	Chevrolet
42	Kyle Petty	SABCO Racing	Pontiac
43	Wally Dallenbach Jr.	Petty Enterprises	Pontiac
45	Rich Bickle (R)	Terminal Trucking Motorsports	Ford
47	Billy Standridge (R)	Johnson Standridge Racing	Ford
55	Jimmy Hensley	RaDiUs Motorsports	Ford
61	Rick Carelli	Chesrown Racing	Chevrolet
66	Mike Wallace (R)	Owen Racing	Chevrolet
71	Dave Marcis	Marcis Auto Racing	Chevrolet
75	Todd Bodine	Butch Mock Motorsports	Ford
77	Greg Sacks	Jasper Motorsports	Ford
90	Bobby Hillin Jr.	Donlavey Racing	Ford
95	Jeremy Mayfield (R)	Sadler Brothers Racing	Ford
98	Derrike Cope	Cale Yarborough Motorsports	Ford

== Qualifying ==
Qualifying was split into two rounds. The first round was held on Friday, March 4, at 3:00 PM EST. Each driver would have one lap to set a time. During the first round, the top 20 drivers in the round would be guaranteed a starting spot in the race. If a driver was not able to guarantee a spot in the first round, they had the option to scrub their time from the first round and try and run a faster lap time in a second round qualifying run, held on Saturday, March 5, at 11:00 AM EST. As with the first round, each driver would have one lap to set a time. For this specific race, positions 21-34 would be decided on time, and depending on who needed it, a select amount of positions were given to cars who had not otherwise qualified but were high enough in owner's points; which was usually two. If needed, a past champion who did not qualify on either time or provisionals could use a champion's provisional, adding one more spot to the field.

Ted Musgrave, driving for Roush Racing, won the pole, setting a time of 21.867 and an average speed of 123.474 mph (198.712 km/h) in the first round.

Nine drivers would fail to qualify.

=== Full qualifying results ===
Pos.	#	Driver	Team	Make	Time	Speed
1	16	Ted Musgrave	Roush Racing	Ford	21.867	123.474
2	6	Mark Martin	Roush Racing	Ford	21.949	123.012
3	12	Chuck Bown	Bobby Allison Motorsports	Ford	21.956	122.973
4	1	Rick Mast	Precision Products Racing	Ford	22.000	122.727
5	30	Michael Waltrip	Bahari Racing	Pontiac	22.018	122.627
6	4	Sterling Marlin	Morgan–McClure Motorsports	Chevrolet	22.033	122.543
7	28	Ernie Irvan	Robert Yates Racing	Ford	22.066	122.360
8	24	Jeff Gordon	Hendrick Motorsports	Chevrolet	22.086	122.249
9	3	Dale Earnhardt	Richard Childress Racing	Chevrolet	22.096	122.194
10	27	Jimmy Spencer	Junior Johnson & Associates	Ford	22.100	122.172
11	41	Joe Nemechek (R)	Larry Hedrick Motorsports	Chevrolet	22.100	122.172
12	2	Rusty Wallace	Penske Racing South	Ford	22.103	122.155
13	26	Brett Bodine	King Racing	Ford	22.110	122.117
14	75	Todd Bodine	Butch Mock Motorsports	Ford	22.110	122.117
15	29	Steve Grissom (R)	Diamond Ridge Motorsports	Chevrolet	22.114	122.095
16	25	Ken Schrader	Hendrick Motorsports	Chevrolet	22.117	122.078
17	7	Geoff Bodine	Geoff Bodine Racing	Ford	22.130	122.006
18	95	Jeremy Mayfield (R)	Sadler Brothers Racing	Ford	22.135	121.979
19	42	Kyle Petty	SABCO Racing	Pontiac	22.137	121.968
20	32	Dick Trickle	Active Motorsports	Chevrolet	22.150	121.896
Failed to lock in Round 1
21	77	Greg Sacks	U.S. Motorsports Inc.	Ford	22.125	122.034
22	18	Dale Jarrett	Joe Gibbs Racing	Chevrolet	22.172	121.775
23	55	Jimmy Hensley	RaDiUs Motorsports	Ford	22.190	121.676
24	14	John Andretti (R)	Hagan Racing	Chevrolet	22.197	121.638
25	8	Jeff Burton (R)	Stavola Brothers Racing	Ford	22.198	121.633
26	11	Bill Elliott	Junior Johnson & Associates	Ford	22.202	121.611
27	17	Darrell Waltrip	Darrell Waltrip Motorsports	Chevrolet	22.202	121.611
28	33	Harry Gant	Leo Jackson Motorsports	Chevrolet	22.205	121.594
29	31	Ward Burton (R)	A.G. Dillard Motorsports	Chevrolet	22.206	121.589
30	15	Lake Speed	Bud Moore Engineering	Ford	22.226	121.479
31	22	Bobby Labonte	Bill Davis Racing	Pontiac	22.227	121.474
32	21	Morgan Shepherd	Wood Brothers Racing	Ford	22.232	121.447
33	98	Derrike Cope	Cale Yarborough Motorsports	Ford	22.232	121.447
34	10	Ricky Rudd	Rudd Performance Motorsports	Ford	22.239	121.408
Provisionals
35	40	Bobby Hamilton	SABCO Racing	Pontiac	-*	-*
36	90	Bobby Hillin Jr.	Donlavey Racing	Ford	-*	-*
Champion's Provisional
37	5	Terry Labonte	Hendrick Motorsports	Chevrolet	-*	-*
Failed to qualify
38	19	Loy Allen Jr. (R)	TriStar Motorsports	Ford	-*	-*
39	45	Rich Bickle (R)	Terminal Trucking Motorsports	Ford	-*	-*
40	71	Dave Marcis	Marcis Auto Racing	Chevrolet	-*	-*
41	43	Wally Dallenbach Jr.	Petty Enterprises	Pontiac	-*	-*
42	23	Hut Stricklin	Travis Carter Enterprises	Ford	-*	-*
43	47	Billy Standridge (R)	Johnson Standridge Racing	Ford	-*	-*
44	61	Rick Carelli	Chesrown Racing	Chevrolet	-*	-*
45	02	T. W. Taylor	Taylor Racing	Ford	-*	-*
46	66	Mike Wallace (R)	Owen Racing	Chevrolet	-*	-*
Official first round qualifying results
Official starting lineup

== Race results ==
Fin	St	#	Driver	Team	Make	Laps	Led	Status	Pts	Winnings
1	7	28	Ernie Irvan	Robert Yates Racing	Ford	400	189	running	185	$71,175
2	12	2	Rusty Wallace	Penske Racing South	Ford	400	96	running	175	$39,575
3	8	24	Jeff Gordon	Hendrick Motorsports	Chevrolet	400	2	running	170	$34,000
4	9	3	Dale Earnhardt	Richard Childress Racing	Chevrolet	400	10	running	165	$29,550
5	19	42	Kyle Petty	SABCO Racing	Pontiac	400	0	running	155	$26,500
6	2	6	Mark Martin	Roush Racing	Ford	400	27	running	155	$23,150
7	4	1	Rick Mast	Precision Products Racing	Ford	400	30	running	151	$9,725
8	13	26	Brett Bodine	King Racing	Ford	400	0	running	142	$16,525
9	37	5	Terry Labonte	Hendrick Motorsports	Chevrolet	400	1	running	143	$20,825
10	22	18	Dale Jarrett	Joe Gibbs Racing	Chevrolet	399	0	running	134	$21,825
11	16	25	Ken Schrader	Hendrick Motorsports	Chevrolet	399	0	running	130	$15,325
12	26	11	Bill Elliott	Junior Johnson & Associates	Ford	399	0	running	127	$15,025
13	1	16	Ted Musgrave	Roush Racing	Ford	399	45	running	129	$19,375
14	30	15	Lake Speed	Bud Moore Engineering	Ford	399	0	running	121	$17,575
15	32	21	Morgan Shepherd	Wood Brothers Racing	Ford	398	0	running	118	$17,835
16	27	17	Darrell Waltrip	Darrell Waltrip Motorsports	Chevrolet	398	0	running	115	$14,500
17	3	12	Chuck Bown	Bobby Allison Motorsports	Ford	398	0	running	112	$14,300
18	34	10	Ricky Rudd	Rudd Performance Motorsports	Ford	398	0	running	109	$7,250
19	6	4	Sterling Marlin	Morgan–McClure Motorsports	Chevrolet	397	0	running	106	$17,225
20	25	8	Jeff Burton (R)	Stavola Brothers Racing	Ford	397	0	running	103	$15,350
21	11	41	Joe Nemechek (R)	Larry Hedrick Motorsports	Chevrolet	397	0	running	100	$9,850
22	10	27	Jimmy Spencer	Junior Johnson & Associates	Ford	397	0	running	97	$9,725
23	15	29	Steve Grissom (R)	Diamond Ridge Motorsports	Chevrolet	396	0	running	94	$7,550
24	31	22	Bobby Labonte	Bill Davis Racing	Pontiac	396	0	running	91	$13,525
25	14	75	Todd Bodine	Butch Mock Motorsports	Ford	396	0	running	88	$9,375
26	36	90	Bobby Hillin Jr.	Donlavey Racing	Ford	390	0	running	85	$9,250
27	18	95	Jeremy Mayfield (R)	Sadler Brothers Racing	Ford	390	0	running	82	$6,925
28	21	77	Greg Sacks	U.S. Motorsports Inc.	Ford	385	0	running	79	$7,400
29	33	98	Derrike Cope	Cale Yarborough Motorsports	Ford	381	0	running	76	$9,075
30	24	14	John Andretti (R)	Hagan Racing	Chevrolet	355	0	engine	73	$12,945
31	5	30	Michael Waltrip	Bahari Racing	Pontiac	328	0	running	70	$12,825
32	17	7	Geoff Bodine	Geoff Bodine Racing	Ford	301	0	engine	67	$12,800
33	35	40	Bobby Hamilton	SABCO Racing	Pontiac	180	0	engine	65	$12,285
34	28	33	Harry Gant	Leo Jackson Motorsports	Chevrolet	72	0	accident	62	$11,775
35	29	31	Ward Burton (R)	A.G. Dillard Motorsports	Chevrolet	71	0	piston	59	$6,775
36	23	55	Jimmy Hensley	RaDiUs Motorsports	Ford	50	0	engine	56	$7,275
37	20	32	Dick Trickle	Active Motorsports	Chevrolet	1	0	accident	53	$6,775
Official race results

== Standings after the race ==
Drivers' Championship standings

	Pos	Driver	Points
1	1	Ernie Irvan	520
1	2	Dale Earnhardt	467 (-53)
2	3	Sterling Marlin	461 (-59)
	4	Mark Martin	449 (–71)
	5	Terry Labonte	425 (–95)
2	6	Ken Schrader	402 (–118)
4	7	Jeff Gordon	402 (–118)
5	8	Rusty Wallace	400 (–120)
3	9	Morgan Shepherd	398 (–122)
	10	Rick Mast	398 (–122)
Official driver's standings

- Note: Only the first 10 positions are included for the driver standings.

Previous race: 1994 Goodwrench 500	NASCAR Winston Cup Series; 1994 season	Next race: 1994 Purolator 500
