= Miller 500 =

Miller 500 may refer to:

- Miller 500 (Busch race), at Martinsville Speedway from 1986 to 1987 and 1992 to 1994
- Miller 500 (Pocono), at Pocono Raceway in 1996
- Miller 500 (Dover), at Dover International Speedway from 1996 to 1997

== See also ==
- Miller High Life 500 (disambiguation)
