= Miller High Life 500 =

Miller High Life 500 may refer to the following NASCAR races:

- Los Angeles Times 500, Ontario Motor Speedway 1971-1972
- Alsco Uniforms 500, Charlotte Motor Speedway 1983-1985
- Kids Free 325, Pocono Raceway 1986-1989

== See also ==
- Miller 500 (disambiguation)
