= Miller 400 =

Miller 400 may refer to:

- Miller 400 (Michigan), at Michigan International Speedway in 1985, 1996 and 1997
- Miller 400 (Richmond), at Richmond International Raceway in 1996
- Miller 400 (Charlotte), a Busch Series race at Charlotte Motor Speedway in 1985
