= 1989 Pannill Sweatshirts 500 =

Eighth race of the 1989 NASCAR Winston Cup Series

Race details
- Race 8 of 29 in the 1989 NASCAR Winston Cup Series
- The 1989 Pannill Sweatshirts 500 program cover, featuring Dale Earnhardt, Dale Earnhardt Jr., and Kelley Earnhardt Miller.
- Date: April 23, 1989
- Official name: 40th Annual Pannill Sweatshirts 500
- Location: Martinsville, Virginia, Martinsville Speedway
- Course: Permanent racing facility
- Course length: 0.526 miles (0.847 km)
- Distance: 500 laps, 263 mi (423.257 km)
- Scheduled distance: 500 laps, 263 mi (423.257 km)
- Average speed: 79.025 miles per hour (127.178 km/h)
- Attendance: 43,000

Pole position
Driver	Geoff Bodine	Hendrick Motorsports
- Time: 20.340

Most laps led
Driver	Darrell Waltrip	Hendrick Motorsports
- Laps: 158

Winner
No. 17	Darrell Waltrip	Hendrick Motorsports

Television in the United States
- Network: ESPN
- Announcers: Bob Jenkins, Ned Jarrett, Benny Parsons

Radio in the United States
- Radio: Motor Racing Network

The 1989 Pannill Sweatshirts 500 was the eighth stock car race of the 1989 NASCAR Winston Cup Series season and the 40th iteration of the event. The race was held on Sunday, April 23, 1989, before an audience of 43,000 in Martinsville, Virginia at Martinsville Speedway, a 0.526 miles (0.847 km) permanent oval-shaped short track. The race took the scheduled 500 laps to complete. Taking advantage of a misfortunate incident Dale Earnhardt suffered in a pit stop late into the race, Hendrick Motorsports driver Darrell Waltrip would manage to pull away in the final 52 laps of the race to capture his 76th career NASCAR Winston Cup Series victory and his third victory of the season. To fill out the top three, the aforementioned Dale Earnhardt and Stavola Brothers Racing driver Dick Trickle would finish second and third, respectively.

== Background ==
The layout of Martinsville Speedway, the venue where the race was held.

Martinsville Speedway is a NASCAR-owned stock car racing track located in Henry County, in Ridgeway, Virginia, just to the south of Martinsville. At 0.526 miles (0.847 km) in length, it is the shortest track in the NASCAR Cup Series. The track was also one of the first paved oval tracks in NASCAR, being built in 1947 by H. Clay Earles. It is also the only remaining race track that has been on the NASCAR circuit from its beginning in 1948.

=== Entry list ===
- (R) denotes rookie driver.

#	Driver	Team	Make	Sponsor
2	Ernie Irvan	U.S. Racing	Pontiac	Kroger
3	Dale Earnhardt	Richard Childress Racing	Chevrolet	GM Goodwrench Service Plus
4	Rick Wilson	Morgan–McClure Motorsports	Oldsmobile	Kodak
5	Geoff Bodine	Hendrick Motorsports	Chevrolet	Levi Garrett
6	Mark Martin	Roush Racing	Ford	Stroh's Light
7	Alan Kulwicki	AK Racing	Ford	Zerex
07	Mark Walbridge	Walbridge Racing	Pontiac	Hanna Car Wash
8	Bobby Hillin Jr.	Stavola Brothers Racing	Buick	Miller High Life
9	Bill Elliott	Melling Racing	Ford	Coors Light
11	Terry Labonte	Junior Johnson & Associates	Ford	Budweiser
15	Brett Bodine	Bud Moore Engineering	Ford	Motorcraft
16	Larry Pearson (R)	Pearson Racing	Buick	Chattanooga Chew
17	Darrell Waltrip	Hendrick Motorsports	Chevrolet	Tide
21	Neil Bonnett	Wood Brothers Racing	Ford	Citgo
23	Eddie Bierschwale	B&B Racing	Oldsmobile	B&B Racing
25	Ken Schrader	Hendrick Motorsports	Chevrolet	Folgers
26	Ricky Rudd	King Racing	Buick	Quaker State
27	Rusty Wallace	Blue Max Racing	Pontiac	Kodiak
28	Davey Allison	Robert Yates Racing	Ford	Texaco, Havoline
29	Dale Jarrett	Cale Yarborough Motorsports	Pontiac	Hardee's
30	Michael Waltrip	Bahari Racing	Pontiac	Country Time
31	Jim Sauter	Bob Clark Motorsports	Pontiac	Bob Clark Motorsports
33	Harry Gant	Jackson Bros. Motorsports	Oldsmobile	Skoal Bandit
40	Ben Hess (R)	Hess Racing	Oldsmobile	Hess Racing
43	Richard Petty	Petty Enterprises	Pontiac	STP
52	Jimmy Means	Jimmy Means Racing	Pontiac	Alka-Seltzer
53	Jerry O'Neil	Aroneck Racing	Chevrolet	Aroneck Racing
55	Phil Parsons	Jackson Bros. Motorsports	Oldsmobile	Skoal, Crown Central Petroleum
57	Hut Stricklin (R)	Osterlund Racing	Pontiac	Heinz
65	Steve Seligman	Seligman Racing	Ford	Seligman Racing
66	Rick Mast (R)	Mach 1 Racing	Chevrolet	Raven Boats
70	J. D. McDuffie	McDuffie Racing	Pontiac	Rumple Furniture
71	Dave Marcis	Marcis Auto Racing	Chevrolet	Lifebuoy
75	Morgan Shepherd	RahMoc Enterprises	Pontiac	Valvoline
83	Lake Speed	Speed Racing	Oldsmobile	Bull's-Eye Barbecue Sauce
84	Dick Trickle (R)	Stavola Brothers Racing	Buick	Miller High Life
88	Greg Sacks	Baker–Schiff Racing	Pontiac	Crisco
90	Chad Little (R)	Donlavey Racing	Ford	Wahoo!
94	Sterling Marlin	Hagan Racing	Oldsmobile	Sunoco

== Qualifying ==
Qualifying was split into two rounds. The first round was held on Friday, April 21, at 2:00 pm EST. Each driver would have one lap to set a time. During the first round, the top 20 drivers in the round would be guaranteed a starting spot in the race. If a driver was not able to guarantee a spot in the first round, they had the option to scrub their time from the first round and try and run a faster lap time in a second round qualifying run, held on Saturday, April 22, at 12:45 pm EST. As with the first round, each driver would have one lap to set a time. For this specific race, positions 21-30 would be decided on time, and depending on who needed it, a select amount of positions were given to cars who had not otherwise qualified but were high enough in owner's points; up to two were given.

Geoff Bodine, driving for Hendrick Motorsports, would win the pole, setting a time of 20.340 and an average speed of 93.097 miles per hour (149.825 km/h) in the first round.

Seven drivers would fail to qualify.

=== Full qualifying results ===
Pos.	#	Driver	Team	Make	Time	Speed
1	5	Geoff Bodine	Hendrick Motorsports	Chevrolet	20.340	93.097
2	7	Alan Kulwicki	AK Racing	Ford	20.470	92.506
3	6	Mark Martin	Roush Racing	Ford	20.475	92.484
4	11	Terry Labonte	Junior Johnson & Associates	Ford	20.504	92.353
5	25	Ken Schrader	Hendrick Motorsports	Chevrolet	20.525	92.258
6	88	Greg Sacks	Baker–Schiff Racing	Pontiac	20.568	92.065
7	3	Dale Earnhardt	Richard Childress Racing	Chevrolet	20.611	91.873
8	4	Rick Wilson	Morgan–McClure Motorsports	Oldsmobile	20.623	91.820
9	27	Rusty Wallace	Blue Max Racing	Pontiac	20.624	91.815
10	17	Darrell Waltrip	Hendrick Motorsports	Chevrolet	20.625	91.811
11	16	Larry Pearson (R)	Pearson Racing	Buick	20.634	91.771
12	30	Michael Waltrip	Bahari Racing	Pontiac	20.650	91.700
13	84	Dick Trickle (R)	Stavola Brothers Racing	Buick	20.652	91.691
14	55	Phil Parsons	Jackson Bros. Motorsports	Oldsmobile	20.672	91.602
15	15	Brett Bodine	Bud Moore Engineering	Ford	20.675	91.589
16	33	Harry Gant	Jackson Bros. Motorsports	Oldsmobile	20.676	91.584
17	43	Richard Petty	Petty Enterprises	Pontiac	20.678	91.576
18	8	Bobby Hillin Jr.	Stavola Brothers Racing	Buick	20.710	91.434
19	21	Neil Bonnett	Wood Brothers Racing	Ford	20.725	91.368
20	66	Rick Mast (R)	Mach 1 Racing	Chevrolet	20.730	91.346
Failed to lock in Round 1
21	75	Morgan Shepherd	RahMoc Enterprises	Pontiac	20.731	91.341
22	94	Sterling Marlin	Hagan Racing	Oldsmobile	20.734	91.328
23	29	Dale Jarrett	Cale Yarborough Motorsports	Pontiac	20.750	91.258
24	9	Bill Elliott	Melling Racing	Ford	20.802	91.030
25	26	Ricky Rudd	King Racing	Buick	20.810	90.995
26	83	Lake Speed	Speed Racing	Oldsmobile	20.878	90.698
27	90	Chad Little (R)	Donlavey Racing	Ford	20.925	90.495
28	28	Davey Allison	Robert Yates Racing	Ford	20.953	90.374
29	57	Hut Stricklin (R)	Osterlund Racing	Pontiac	20.972	90.292
30	71	Dave Marcis	Marcis Auto Racing	Chevrolet	20.973	90.288
Provisionals
31	2	Ernie Irvan	U.S. Racing	Pontiac	20.993	90.201
32	40	Ben Hess (R)	Hess Racing	Oldsmobile	21.016	90.103
Failed to qualify
33	23	Eddie Bierschwale	B&B Racing	Oldsmobile	-*	-*
34	31	Jim Sauter	Bob Clark Motorsports	Pontiac	-*	-*
35	52	Jimmy Means	Jimmy Means Racing	Pontiac	-*	-*
36	70	J. D. McDuffie	McDuffie Racing	Pontiac	-*	-*
37	65	Steve Seligman	Seligman Racing	Ford	-*	-*
38	53	Jerry O'Neil	Aroneck Racing	Chevrolet	-*	-*
39	07	Mark Walbridge	Walbridge Racing	Pontiac	-*	-*
Official first round qualifying results
Official starting lineup

== Race results ==
Fin	St	#	Driver	Team	Make	Laps	Led	Status	Pts	Winnings
1	10	17	Darrell Waltrip	Hendrick Motorsports	Chevrolet	500	158	running	185	$53,600
2	7	3	Dale Earnhardt	Richard Childress Racing	Chevrolet	500	103	running	175	$34,525
3	13	84	Dick Trickle (R)	Stavola Brothers Racing	Buick	500	7	running	170	$21,050
4	8	4	Rick Wilson	Morgan–McClure Motorsports	Oldsmobile	499	0	running	160	$15,975
5	4	11	Terry Labonte	Junior Johnson & Associates	Ford	499	0	running	155	$15,575
6	3	6	Mark Martin	Roush Racing	Ford	498	0	running	150	$10,275
7	5	25	Ken Schrader	Hendrick Motorsports	Chevrolet	498	0	running	146	$10,700
8	22	94	Sterling Marlin	Hagan Racing	Oldsmobile	498	0	running	142	$6,850
9	30	71	Dave Marcis	Marcis Auto Racing	Chevrolet	497	0	running	138	$8,907
10	19	21	Neil Bonnett	Wood Brothers Racing	Ford	496	0	running	134	$8,675
11	26	83	Lake Speed	Speed Racing	Oldsmobile	496	0	running	130	$5,570
12	16	33	Harry Gant	Jackson Bros. Motorsports	Oldsmobile	496	0	running	127	$6,920
13	14	55	Phil Parsons	Jackson Bros. Motorsports	Oldsmobile	496	0	running	124	$5,470
14	28	28	Davey Allison	Robert Yates Racing	Ford	496	0	running	121	$9,470
15	23	29	Dale Jarrett	Cale Yarborough Motorsports	Pontiac	495	0	running	118	$6,070
16	1	5	Geoff Bodine	Hendrick Motorsports	Chevrolet	495	117	running	120	$14,000
17	32	40	Ben Hess (R)	Hess Racing	Oldsmobile	491	0	running	112	$2,230
18	21	75	Morgan Shepherd	RahMoc Enterprises	Pontiac	491	0	running	109	$8,655
19	31	2	Ernie Irvan	U.S. Racing	Pontiac	487	0	running	106	$2,925
20	24	9	Bill Elliott	Melling Racing	Ford	476	0	running	103	$12,225
21	18	8	Bobby Hillin Jr.	Stavola Brothers Racing	Buick	456	0	running	100	$4,350
22	2	7	Alan Kulwicki	AK Racing	Ford	450	51	running	102	$8,055
23	25	26	Ricky Rudd	King Racing	Buick	433	0	running	94	$3,945
24	17	43	Richard Petty	Petty Enterprises	Pontiac	420	0	running	91	$2,570
25	12	30	Michael Waltrip	Bahari Racing	Pontiac	391	0	timing chain	88	$4,275
26	27	90	Chad Little (R)	Donlavey Racing	Ford	358	0	running	85	$1,650
27	15	15	Brett Bodine	Bud Moore Engineering	Ford	345	0	valve	82	$4,025
28	6	88	Greg Sacks	Baker–Schiff Racing	Pontiac	330	0	engine	79	$3,900
29	11	16	Larry Pearson (R)	Pearson Racing	Buick	310	0	crash	76	$2,375
30	29	57	Hut Stricklin (R)	Osterlund Racing	Pontiac	291	0	crash	73	$1,610
31	9	27	Rusty Wallace	Blue Max Racing	Pontiac	272	64	engine	75	$10,510
32	20	66	Rick Mast (R)	Mach 1 Racing	Chevrolet	251	0	engine	67	$3,260
Failed to qualify
33		23	Eddie Bierschwale	B&B Racing	Oldsmobile					
34		31	Jim Sauter	Bob Clark Motorsports	Pontiac					
35		52	Jimmy Means	Jimmy Means Racing	Pontiac					
36		70	J. D. McDuffie	McDuffie Racing	Pontiac					
37		65	Steve Seligman	Seligman Racing	Ford					
38		53	Jerry O'Neil	Aroneck Racing	Chevrolet					
39		07	Mark Walbridge	Walbridge Racing	Pontiac					
Official race results

== Standings after the race ==
Drivers' Championship standings

	Pos	Driver	Points
	1	Dale Earnhardt	1,229
	2	Geoff Bodine	1,171 (-58)
	3	Alan Kulwicki	1,147 (-82)
1	4	Darrell Waltrip	1,139 (–90)
1	5	Rusty Wallace	1,099 (–130)
	6	Sterling Marlin	1,078 (–151)
1	7	Mark Martin	1,043 (–186)
1	8	Davey Allison	1,037 (–192)
1	9	Dick Trickle	1,001 (–228)
1	10	Rick Wilson	989 (–240)
Official driver's standings

- Note: Only the first 10 positions are included for the driver standings.

Previous race: 1989 First Union 400	NASCAR Winston Cup Series; 1989 season	Next race: 1989 Winston 500
