= 1989 Pontiac Excitement 400 =

Fourth race of the 1989 NASCAR Winston Cup Series

Race details
- Race 4 of 29 in the 1989 NASCAR Winston Cup Series
- The 1989 Pontiac Excitement 400 program cover, with artwork by NASCAR artist Sam Bass.
- Date: March 26, 1989
- Official name: 35th Annual Pontiac Excitement 400
- Location: Richmond, Virginia, Richmond International Raceway
- Course: Permanent racing facility
- Course length: 0.75 miles (1.21 km)
- Distance: 400 laps, 300 mi (482.803 km)
- Scheduled distance: 400 laps, 300 mi (482.803 km)
- Average speed: 89.619 miles per hour (144.228 km/h)
- Attendance: 50,000

Pole position
Driver	Geoff Bodine	Hendrick Motorsports
- Time: 22.393

Most laps led
Driver	Geoff Bodine	Hendrick Motorsports
- Laps: 126

Winner
No. 27	Rusty Wallace	Blue Max Racing

Television in the United States
- Network: TBS
- Announcers: Ken Squier, Johnny Hayes

Radio in the United States
- Radio: Motor Racing Network

The 1989 Pontiac Excitement 400 was the fourth stock car race of the 1989 NASCAR Winston Cup Series season and the 35th iteration of the event. The race was held on Sunday, March 26, 1989, before an audience of 50,000 in Richmond, Virginia, at Richmond International Raceway, a 0.75 miles (1.21 km) D-shaped oval. The race took the scheduled 400 laps to complete. With the assist of a late caution and a fast final pitstop, Blue Max Racing driver Rusty Wallace would pull away from the field on the final restart with 17 laps left to take his 12th career NASCAR Winston Cup Series victory and his second victory of the season. To fill out the top three, owner-driver Alan Kulwicki and Richard Childress Racing driver Dale Earnhardt would finish second and third, respectively.

== Background ==
The layout of Richmond International Raceway, the venue where the race was at.

Richmond International Raceway (RIR) is a 3/4-mile (1.2 km), D-shaped, asphalt race track located just outside Richmond, Virginia in Henrico County. It hosts the Monster Energy NASCAR Cup Series and Xfinity Series. Known as "America's premier short track", it formerly hosted a NASCAR Camping World Truck Series race, an IndyCar Series race, and two USAC sprint car races.

=== Entry list ===
- (R) denotes rookie driver.

#	Driver	Team	Make	Sponsor
2	Ernie Irvan	U.S. Racing	Pontiac	Kroger
3	Dale Earnhardt	Richard Childress Racing	Chevrolet	GM Goodwrench Service Plus
4	Rick Wilson	Morgan–McClure Motorsports	Oldsmobile	Kodak
04	Bill Meacham	Meacham Racing	Ford	Meacham Racing
5	Geoff Bodine	Hendrick Motorsports	Chevrolet	Levi Garrett
6	Mark Martin	Roush Racing	Ford	Stroh's Light
7	Alan Kulwicki	AK Racing	Ford	Zerex
8	Bobby Hillin Jr.	Stavola Brothers Racing	Buick	Miller High Life
9	Bill Elliott	Melling Racing	Ford	Coors Light
11	Terry Labonte	Junior Johnson & Associates	Ford	Budweiser
15	Brett Bodine	Bud Moore Engineering	Ford	Motorcraft
16	Larry Pearson (R)	Pearson Racing	Buick	Chattanooga Chew
17	Darrell Waltrip	Hendrick Motorsports	Chevrolet	Tide
19	Bill Ingram	Gray Racing	Oldsmobile	Gray Racing
21	Neil Bonnett	Wood Brothers Racing	Ford	Citgo
23	Eddie Bierschwale	B&B Racing	Oldsmobile	B&B Racing
25	Ken Schrader	Hendrick Motorsports	Chevrolet	Folgers
26	Ricky Rudd	King Racing	Buick	Quaker State
27	Rusty Wallace	Blue Max Racing	Pontiac	Kodiak
28	Davey Allison	Robert Yates Racing	Ford	Texaco, Havoline
29	Dale Jarrett	Cale Yarborough Motorsports	Pontiac	Hardee's
30	Michael Waltrip	Bahari Racing	Pontiac	Country Time
31	Jim Sauter	Bob Clark Motorsports	Pontiac	Slender You Figure Salons
33	Harry Gant	Jackson Bros. Motorsports	Oldsmobile	Skoal Bandit
34	Rodney Combs	AAG Racing	Buick	AAG Racing
40	Ben Hess (R)	Hess Racing	Oldsmobile	Hess Racing
42	Kyle Petty	SABCO Racing	Pontiac	Peak Antifreeze
43	Richard Petty	Petty Enterprises	Pontiac	STP
48	Mickey Gibbs (R)	Winkle Motorsports	Pontiac	SmartLease
49	Tony Spanos	Hylton Motorsports	Buick	Hylton Motorsports
51	Butch Miller (R)	Miller Racing	Chevrolet	Miller Racing
52	Jimmy Means	Jimmy Means Racing	Pontiac	Alka-Seltzer
55	Phil Parsons	Jackson Bros. Motorsports	Oldsmobile	Skoal, Crown Central Petroleum
57	Hut Stricklin (R)	Osterlund Racing	Pontiac	Heinz
65	Steve Seligman	O'Neil Racing	Ford	O'Neil Racing
66	Rick Mast (R)	Mach 1 Racing	Chevrolet	Mach 1 Racing
68	Derrike Cope	Testa Racing	Pontiac	Purolator
70	J. D. McDuffie	McDuffie Racing	Pontiac	Rumple Furniture
71	Dave Marcis	Marcis Auto Racing	Chevrolet	Lifebuoy
75	Morgan Shepherd	RahMoc Enterprises	Pontiac	Valvoline
83	Lake Speed	Speed Racing	Oldsmobile	Bull's-Eye Barbecue Sauce
84	Dick Trickle (R)	Stavola Brothers Racing	Buick	Miller High Life
88	Greg Sacks	Baker–Schiff Racing	Pontiac	Crisco
90	Chad Little (R)	Donlavey Racing	Ford	Wahoo!
94	Sterling Marlin	Hagan Racing	Oldsmobile	Sunoco

== Qualifying ==
Qualifying was split into two rounds. The first round was held on Saturday, March 25, at 2:30 PM EST. Each driver would have one lap to set a time. During the first round, the top 20 drivers in the round would be guaranteed a starting spot in the race. If a driver was not able to guarantee a spot in the first round, they had the option to scrub their time from the first round and try and run a faster lap time in a second round qualifying run, held on Saturday, March 25, at 4:00 PM EST. As with the first round, each driver would have one lap to set a time. For this specific race, positions 21-34 would be decided on time, and depending on who needed it, a select amount of positions were given to cars who had not otherwise qualified but were high enough in owner's points; up to two were given.

Geoff Bodine, driving for Hendrick Motorsports, would win the pole, setting a time of 22.393 and an average speed of 120.573 miles per hour (194.043 km/h) in the first round.

Nine drivers would fail to qualify. One of the nine who failed to qualify, Richard Petty, would break a streak of 513 consecutive starts in the NASCAR Winston Cup Series.

=== Full qualifying results ===
Pos.	#	Driver	Team	Make	Time	Speed
1	5	Geoff Bodine	Hendrick Motorsports	Chevrolet	22.393	120.573
2	27	Rusty Wallace	Blue Max Racing	Pontiac	22.441	120.315
3	6	Mark Martin	Roush Racing	Ford	22.556	119.702
4	7	Alan Kulwicki	AK Racing	Ford	22.563	119.665
5	4	Rick Wilson	Morgan–McClure Motorsports	Oldsmobile	22.570	119.628
6	3	Dale Earnhardt	Richard Childress Racing	Chevrolet	22.571	119.623
7	25	Ken Schrader	Hendrick Motorsports	Chevrolet	22.582	119.564
8	94	Sterling Marlin	Hagan Racing	Oldsmobile	22.680	119.048
9	9	Bill Elliott	Melling Racing	Ford	22.732	118.775
10	51	Butch Miller (R)	Miller Racing	Chevrolet	22.758	118.640
11	17	Darrell Waltrip	Hendrick Motorsports	Chevrolet	22.782	118.515
12	16	Larry Pearson (R)	Pearson Racing	Buick	22.811	118.364
13	15	Brett Bodine	Bud Moore Engineering	Ford	22.816	118.338
14	84	Dick Trickle (R)	Stavola Brothers Racing	Buick	22.827	118.281
15	2	Ernie Irvan	U.S. Racing	Pontiac	22.827	118.281
16	66	Rick Mast (R)	Mach 1 Racing	Chevrolet	22.834	118.245
17	90	Chad Little	Donlavey Racing	Ford	22.838	118.224
18	26	Ricky Rudd	King Racing	Buick	22.841	118.208
19	11	Terry Labonte	Junior Johnson & Associates	Ford	22.849	118.167
20	55	Phil Parsons	Jackson Bros. Motorsports	Oldsmobile	22.872	118.048
Failed to lock in Round 1
21	34	Rodney Combs	AAG Racing	Buick	22.819	118.322
22	30	Michael Waltrip	Bahari Racing	Pontiac	22.829	118.271
23	83	Lake Speed	Speed Racing	Oldsmobile	22.841	118.208
24	23	Eddie Bierschwale	B&B Racing	Oldsmobile	22.843	118.198
25	40	Ben Hess (R)	Hess Racing	Oldsmobile	22.888	117.966
26	33	Harry Gant	Jackson Bros. Motorsports	Oldsmobile	22.889	117.961
27	88	Greg Sacks	Baker–Schiff Racing	Pontiac	22.897	117.919
28	21	Neil Bonnett	Wood Brothers Racing	Ford	22.899	117.909
29	8	Bobby Hillin Jr.	Stavola Brothers Racing	Buick	22.905	117.878
30	75	Morgan Shepherd	RahMoc Enterprises	Pontiac	22.907	117.868
31	68	Derrike Cope	Testa Racing	Pontiac	22.920	117.801
32	29	Dale Jarrett	Cale Yarborough Motorsports	Pontiac	22.923	117.786
33	31	Jim Sauter	Bob Clark Motorsports	Pontiac	22.935	117.724
34	48	Mickey Gibbs (R)	Winkle Motorsports	Pontiac	22.973	117.529
Provisionals
35	28	Davey Allison	Robert Yates Racing	Ford	22.992	117.432
36	71	Dave Marcis	Marcis Auto Racing	Chevrolet	23.058	117.096
Failed to qualify
37	57	Hut Stricklin (R)	Osterlund Racing	Pontiac	23.004	117.371
38	42	Kyle Petty	SABCO Racing	Pontiac	23.020	117.289
39	52	Jimmy Means	Jimmy Means Racing	Pontiac	23.167	116.545
40	43	Richard Petty	Petty Enterprises	Pontiac	23.169	116.535
41	70	J. D. McDuffie	McDuffie Racing	Pontiac	23.589	114.460
42	04	Bill Meacham	Meacham Racing	Ford	23.657	114.131
43	65	Steve Seligman	O'Neil Racing	Ford	23.824	113.331
44	19	Bill Ingram	Gray Racing	Oldsmobile	24.038	112.322
45	49	Tony Spanos	Hylton Motorsports	Buick	24.623	109.654
Official starting lineup

== Race results ==
Fin	St	#	Driver	Team	Make	Laps	Led	Status	Pts	Winnings
1	2	27	Rusty Wallace	Blue Max Racing	Pontiac	400	88	running	180	$63,025
2	4	7	Alan Kulwicki	AK Racing	Ford	400	108	running	175	$28,625
3	6	3	Dale Earnhardt	Richard Childress Racing	Chevrolet	400	43	running	170	$30,900
4	18	26	Ricky Rudd	King Racing	Buick	400	0	running	160	$13,600
5	35	28	Davey Allison	Robert Yates Racing	Ford	399	11	running	160	$17,607
6	12	16	Larry Pearson (R)	Pearson Racing	Buick	399	0	running	150	$5,350
7	11	17	Darrell Waltrip	Hendrick Motorsports	Chevrolet	399	0	running	146	$10,600
8	8	94	Sterling Marlin	Hagan Racing	Oldsmobile	398	0	running	142	$8,900
9	15	2	Ernie Irvan	U.S. Racing	Pontiac	398	0	running	138	$5,000
10	9	9	Bill Elliott	Melling Racing	Ford	397	0	running	134	$14,275
11	3	6	Mark Martin	Roush Racing	Ford	397	0	running	130	$6,000
12	23	83	Lake Speed	Speed Racing	Oldsmobile	397	0	running	127	$5,675
13	22	30	Michael Waltrip	Bahari Racing	Pontiac	397	0	running	124	$5,525
14	26	33	Harry Gant	Jackson Bros. Motorsports	Oldsmobile	396	0	running	121	$5,250
15	29	8	Bobby Hillin Jr.	Stavola Brothers Racing	Buick	396	0	running	118	$5,750
16	16	66	Rick Mast (R)	Mach 1 Racing	Chevrolet	396	0	running	115	$5,050
17	5	4	Rick Wilson	Morgan–McClure Motorsports	Oldsmobile	396	0	running	112	$4,550
18	1	5	Geoff Bodine	Hendrick Motorsports	Chevrolet	395	126	running	119	$12,350
19	7	25	Ken Schrader	Hendrick Motorsports	Chevrolet	394	0	running	106	$7,775
20	36	71	Dave Marcis	Marcis Auto Racing	Chevrolet	394	0	running	103	$5,275
21	28	21	Neil Bonnett	Wood Brothers Racing	Ford	393	0	running	100	$4,250
22	17	90	Chad Little	Donlavey Racing	Ford	392	0	running	97	$2,625
23	32	29	Dale Jarrett	Cale Yarborough Motorsports	Pontiac	390	0	running	94	$4,025
24	25	40	Ben Hess (R)	Hess Racing	Oldsmobile	385	0	running	91	$1,850
25	14	84	Dick Trickle (R)	Stavola Brothers Racing	Buick	377	1	engine	93	$4,125
26	10	51	Butch Miller (R)	Miller Racing	Chevrolet	376	0	running	85	$1,775
27	20	55	Phil Parsons	Jackson Bros. Motorsports	Oldsmobile	323	23	running	87	$3,250
28	13	15	Brett Bodine	Bud Moore Engineering	Ford	275	0	valve	79	$3,220
29	34	48	Mickey Gibbs (R)	Winkle Motorsports	Pontiac	229	0	engine	76	$1,690
30	19	11	Terry Labonte	Junior Johnson & Associates	Ford	202	0	crash	73	$7,420
31	24	23	Eddie Bierschwale	B&B Racing	Oldsmobile	152	0	camshaft	70	$1,640
32	21	34	Rodney Combs	AAG Racing	Buick	133	0	clutch	67	$2,260
33	30	75	Morgan Shepherd	RahMoc Enterprises	Pontiac	128	0	valve	64	$7,250
34	27	88	Greg Sacks	Baker–Schiff Racing	Pontiac	87	0	engine	61	$2,900
35	31	68	Derrike Cope	Testa Racing	Pontiac	15	0	crash	58	$1,400
36	33	31	Jim Sauter	Bob Clark Motorsports	Pontiac	1	0	engine	55	$1,400
Failed to qualify
37		57	Hut Stricklin (R)	Osterlund Racing	Pontiac					
38		42	Kyle Petty	SABCO Racing	Pontiac					
39		52	Jimmy Means	Jimmy Means Racing	Pontiac					
40		43	Richard Petty	Petty Enterprises	Pontiac					
41		70	J. D. McDuffie	McDuffie Racing	Pontiac					
42		04	Bill Meacham	Meacham Racing	Ford					
43		65	Steve Seligman	O'Neil Racing	Ford					
44		19	Bill Ingram	Gray Racing	Oldsmobile					
45		49	Tony Spanos	Hylton Motorsports	Buick					
Official race results

== Standings after the race ==
Drivers' Championship standings

	Pos	Driver	Points
	1	Dale Earnhardt	680
	2	Alan Kulwicki	616 (-64)
1	3	Darrell Waltrip	582 (-98)
1	4	Sterling Marlin	573 (–107)
2	5	Geoff Bodine	560 (–120)
2	6	Rusty Wallace	554 (–126)
1	7	Rick Wilson	521 (–159)
1	8	Ken Schrader	497 (–183)
3	9	Michael Waltrip	459 (–221)
1	10	Rick Mast	458 (–222)
Official driver's standings

- Note: Only the first 10 positions are included for the driver standings.

Previous race: 1989 Motorcraft Quality Parts 500	NASCAR Winston Cup Series; 1989 season	Next race: 1989 TranSouth 500
