= 1989 Goodwrench 500 =

Second race of the 1989 NASCAR Winston Cup Series

Race details
- Race 2 of 29 in the 1989 NASCAR Winston Cup Series
- The 1989 GM Goodwrench 500 program cover, featuring Dale Earnhardt.
- Date: March 5, 1989
- Official name: 24th Annual Goodwrench 500
- Location: Rockingham, North Carolina, North Carolina Speedway
- Course: Permanent racing facility
- Course length: 1.017 miles (1.637 km)
- Distance: 492 laps, 500.364 mi (805.257 km)
- Scheduled distance: 492 laps, 500.364 mi (805.257 km)
- Average speed: 115.122 miles per hour (185.271 km/h)
- Attendance: 44,300

Pole position
Driver	Rusty Wallace	Blue Max Racing
- Time: 24.606

Most laps led
Driver	Rusty Wallace	Blue Max Racing
- Laps: 222

Winner
No. 27	Rusty Wallace	Blue Max Racing

Television in the United States
- Network: ESPN
- Announcers: Bob Jenkins, Gary Nelson, Ned Jarrett

Radio in the United States
- Radio: Motor Racing Network

The 1989 Goodwrench 500 was the second stock car race of the 1989 NASCAR Winston Cup Series and the 24th iteration of the event. The race was held on Sunday, March 5, 1989, before an audience of 44,300 in Rockingham, North Carolina, at North Carolina Speedway, a 1.017 miles (1.637 km) permanent high-banked racetrack. On the final restart with six laps left in the race, Blue Max Racing driver Rusty Wallace would manage to pull away to a sizable lead to take his 11th career NASCAR Winston Cup Series victory and his first victory of the season. To fill out the top three, owner-driver Alan Kulwicki and Richard Childress Racing driver Dale Earnhardt would finish second and third, respectively.

== Background ==
The layout of North Carolina Motor Speedway, the venue where the race was held.

North Carolina Motor Speedway was opened as a flat, one-mile oval on October 31, 1965. In 1969, the track was extensively reconfigured to a high-banked, D-shaped oval just over one mile in length. In 1997, North Carolina Motor Speedway merged with Penske Motorsports, and was renamed North Carolina Speedway. Shortly thereafter, the infield was reconfigured, and competition on the infield road course, mostly by the SCCA, was discontinued. Currently, the track is home to the Fast Track High Performance Driving School.

=== Entry list ===
- (R) denotes rookie driver.

#	Driver	Team	Make	Sponsor
2	Ernie Irvan	U.S. Racing	Pontiac	Kroger
3	Dale Earnhardt	Richard Childress Racing	Chevrolet	GM Goodwrench Service Plus
4	Rick Wilson	Morgan–McClure Motorsports	Oldsmobile	Kodak
5	Geoff Bodine	Hendrick Motorsports	Chevrolet	Levi Garrett
6	Mark Martin	Roush Racing	Ford	Stroh's Light
7	Alan Kulwicki	AK Racing	Ford	Zerex
8	Bobby Hillin Jr.	Stavola Brothers Racing	Buick	Miller High Life
9	Bill Elliott	Melling Racing	Ford	Coors Light
10	Ken Bouchard	Whitcomb Racing	Pontiac	Whitcomb Racing
11	Terry Labonte	Junior Johnson & Associates	Ford	Budweiser
15	Brett Bodine	Bud Moore Engineering	Ford	Motorcraft
16	Larry Pearson (R)	Pearson Racing	Buick	Chattanooga Chew
17	Darrell Waltrip	Hendrick Motorsports	Chevrolet	Tide
20	Dave Mader III	Bahre Racing	Pontiac	Cheerwine
21	Neil Bonnett	Wood Brothers Racing	Ford	Citgo
23	Eddie Bierschwale	B&B Racing	Oldsmobile	B&B Racing
25	Ken Schrader	Hendrick Motorsports	Chevrolet	Folgers
26	Ricky Rudd	King Racing	Buick	Quaker State
27	Rusty Wallace	Blue Max Racing	Pontiac	Kodiak
28	Davey Allison	Robert Yates Racing	Ford	Texaco, Havoline
29	Dale Jarrett	Cale Yarborough Motorsports	Pontiac	Hardee's
30	Michael Waltrip	Bahari Racing	Pontiac	Country Time
31	Jim Sauter	Bob Clark Motorsports	Pontiac	Slender You Figure Salons
33	Harry Gant	Jackson Bros. Motorsports	Oldsmobile	Skoal Bandit
34	Rodney Combs	AAG Racing	Buick	Allen's Glass
40	Ben Hess (R)	Hess Racing	Oldsmobile	Hess Racing
41	Jim Bown	Bown Racing	Chevrolet	Rose Auto Wrecking
43	Richard Petty	Petty Enterprises	Pontiac	STP
48	Mickey Gibbs (R)	Winkle Motorsports	Pontiac	SmartLease
51	Butch Miller (R)	Miller Racing	Chevrolet	Miller Racing
52	Jimmy Means	Jimmy Means Racing	Pontiac	Alka-Seltzer
53	Jerry O'Neil	Aroneck Racing	Chevrolet	Aroneck Racing
55	Phil Parsons	Jackson Bros. Motorsports	Oldsmobile	Skoal, Crown Central Petroleum
57	Hut Stricklin (R)	Osterlund Racing	Pontiac	Heinz
66	Rick Mast (R)	Mach 1 Racing	Chevrolet	Mach 1 Racing
70	J. D. McDuffie	McDuffie Racing	Pontiac	Rumple Furniture
71	Dave Marcis	Marcis Auto Racing	Chevrolet	Lifebuoy
75	Morgan Shepherd	RahMoc Enterprises	Pontiac	Valvoline
83	Lake Speed	Speed Racing	Oldsmobile	Bull's-Eye Barbecue Sauce
84	Dick Trickle (R)	Stavola Brothers Racing	Buick	Miller High Life
88	Greg Sacks	Baker–Schiff Racing	Pontiac	Crisco
94	Sterling Marlin	Hagan Racing	Oldsmobile	Sunoco

== Qualifying ==
Qualifying was originally scheduled to be split into two rounds. The first round was held on Thursday, March 2, at 2:30 PM EST. Originally, the first 20 positions were going to be determined by first round qualifying, with positions 21-40 meant to be determined the following day on Friday, March 3. However, due to rain, the second round was cancelled. As a result, the rest of the starting lineup was set using the results from the first round. Depending on who needed it, a select amount of positions were given to cars who had not otherwise qualified but were high enough in owner's points; up to two were given.

Rusty Wallace, driving for Blue Max Racing, would win the pole, setting a time of 24.606 and an average speed of 148.793 miles per hour (239.459 km/h) in the first round.

No drivers would fail to qualify.

=== Full qualifying results ===
Pos.	#	Driver	Team	Make	Time	Speed
1	27	Rusty Wallace	Blue Max Racing	Pontiac	24.606	148.793
2	17	Darrell Waltrip	Hendrick Motorsports	Chevrolet	24.679	148.353
3	25	Ken Schrader	Hendrick Motorsports	Chevrolet	24.709	148.173
4	6	Mark Martin	Roush Racing	Ford	24.717	148.125
5	4	Rick Wilson	Morgan–McClure Motorsports	Oldsmobile	24.847	147.350
6	5	Geoff Bodine	Hendrick Motorsports	Chevrolet	24.887	147.113
7	9	Bill Elliott	Melling Racing	Ford	24.887	147.113
8	33	Harry Gant	Jackson Bros. Motorsports	Oldsmobile	24.896	147.060
9	15	Brett Bodine	Bud Moore Engineering	Ford	24.923	146.900
10	66	Rick Mast (R)	Mach 1 Racing	Chevrolet	24.974	146.600
11	26	Ricky Rudd	King Racing	Buick	24.975	146.595
12	7	Alan Kulwicki	AK Racing	Ford	24.975	146.595
13	75	Morgan Shepherd	RahMoc Enterprises	Pontiac	24.985	146.536
14	11	Terry Labonte	Junior Johnson & Associates	Ford	25.097	145.882
15	88	Greg Sacks	Baker–Schiff Racing	Pontiac	25.111	145.801
16	94	Sterling Marlin	Hagan Racing	Oldsmobile	25.124	145.725
17	28	Davey Allison	Robert Yates Racing	Ford	25.130	145.690
18	2	Ernie Irvan	U.S. Racing	Pontiac	25.146	145.598
19	3	Dale Earnhardt	Richard Childress Racing	Chevrolet	25.205	145.257
20	34	Rodney Combs	AAG Racing	Buick	25.242	145.044
Failed to lock in Round 1
21	55	Phil Parsons	Jackson Bros. Motorsports	Oldsmobile	25.244	145.032
22	29	Dale Jarrett	Cale Yarborough Motorsports	Pontiac	25.261	144.935
23	8	Bobby Hillin Jr.	Stavola Brothers Racing	Buick	25.290	144.769
24	21	Neil Bonnett	Wood Brothers Racing	Ford	25.302	144.700
25	83	Lake Speed	Speed Racing	Oldsmobile	25.328	144.551
26	71	Dave Marcis	Marcis Auto Racing	Chevrolet	25.371	144.306
27	30	Michael Waltrip	Bahari Racing	Pontiac	25.383	144.238
28	16	Larry Pearson (R)	Pearson Racing	Buick	25.412	144.074
29	10	Ken Bouchard	Whitcomb Racing	Pontiac	25.480	143.689
30	40	Ben Hess (R)	Hess Racing	Oldsmobile	25.503	143.560
31	51	Butch Miller (R)	Miller Racing	Chevrolet	25.509	143.526
32	23	Eddie Bierschwale	B&B Racing	Oldsmobile	25.541	143.346
33	31	Jim Sauter	Bob Clark Motorsports	Pontiac	25.565	143.211
34	53	Jerry O'Neil	Aroneck Racing	Chevrolet	25.669	142.631
35	48	Mickey Gibbs (R)	Winkle Motorsports	Pontiac	25.679	142.576
36	52	Jimmy Means	Jimmy Means Racing	Pontiac	25.707	142.420
37	57	Hut Stricklin (R)	Osterlund Racing	Pontiac	25.784	141.995
38	20	Dave Mader III	Bahre Racing	Pontiac	25.912	141.294
39	43	Richard Petty	Petty Enterprises	Pontiac	25.939	141.147
40	41	Jim Bown	Bown Racing	Chevrolet	25.978	140.935
Provisionals
41	70	J. D. McDuffie	McDuffie Racing	Pontiac	-	-
42	84	Dick Trickle (R)	Stavola Brothers Racing	Buick	-	-
Official first round qualifying results
Official starting lineup

== Race results ==
Fin	St	#	Driver	Team	Make	Laps	Led	Status	Pts	Winnings
1	1	27	Rusty Wallace	Blue Max Racing	Pontiac	492	222	running	185	$72,100
2	12	7	Alan Kulwicki	AK Racing	Ford	492	24	running	175	$29,600
3	19	3	Dale Earnhardt	Richard Childress Racing	Chevrolet	492	0	running	165	$24,200
4	6	5	Geoff Bodine	Hendrick Motorsports	Chevrolet	492	19	running	165	$17,975
5	4	6	Mark Martin	Roush Racing	Ford	492	14	running	160	$15,963
6	17	28	Davey Allison	Robert Yates Racing	Ford	492	22	running	155	$14,680
7	16	94	Sterling Marlin	Hagan Racing	Oldsmobile	491	0	running	146	$9,975
8	25	83	Lake Speed	Speed Racing	Oldsmobile	490	2	running	147	$9,525
9	15	88	Greg Sacks	Baker–Schiff Racing	Pontiac	490	0	running	138	$9,225
10	33	31	Jim Sauter	Bob Clark Motorsports	Pontiac	489	0	running	134	$9,450
11	22	29	Dale Jarrett	Cale Yarborough Motorsports	Pontiac	489	2	running	135	$8,525
12	27	30	Michael Waltrip	Bahari Racing	Pontiac	488	0	running	127	$8,125
13	42	84	Dick Trickle (R)	Stavola Brothers Racing	Buick	488	0	running	124	$10,182
14	24	21	Neil Bonnett	Wood Brothers Racing	Ford	488	0	running	121	$7,225
15	23	8	Bobby Hillin Jr.	Stavola Brothers Racing	Buick	487	0	running	118	$7,625
16	39	43	Richard Petty	Petty Enterprises	Pontiac	487	0	running	115	$5,700
17	5	4	Rick Wilson	Morgan–McClure Motorsports	Oldsmobile	487	0	running	112	$6,475
18	14	11	Terry Labonte	Junior Johnson & Associates	Ford	486	0	running	109	$10,475
19	7	9	Bill Elliott	Melling Racing	Ford	486	0	running	106	$14,225
20	35	48	Mickey Gibbs (R)	Winkle Motorsports	Pontiac	486	0	running	103	$4,800
21	10	66	Rick Mast (R)	Mach 1 Racing	Chevrolet	484	0	running	100	$5,925
22	30	40	Ben Hess (R)	Hess Racing	Oldsmobile	483	0	running	97	$2,850
23	18	2	Ernie Irvan	U.S. Racing	Pontiac	482	0	running	94	$3,450
24	38	20	Dave Mader III	Bahre Racing	Pontiac	480	0	running	91	$2,675
25	3	25	Ken Schrader	Hendrick Motorsports	Chevrolet	479	0	accident	88	$9,925
26	32	23	Eddie Bierschwale	B&B Racing	Oldsmobile	479	0	running	85	$2,550
27	13	75	Morgan Shepherd	RahMoc Enterprises	Pontiac	477	0	running	82	$10,700
28	34	53	Jerry O'Neil	Aroneck Racing	Chevrolet	476	0	running	79	$2,450
29	2	17	Darrell Waltrip	Hendrick Motorsports	Chevrolet	461	0	running	76	$11,225
30	28	16	Larry Pearson (R)	Pearson Racing	Buick	457	3	engine	78	$2,375
31	8	33	Harry Gant	Jackson Bros. Motorsports	Oldsmobile	451	79	running	75	$2,200
32	11	26	Ricky Rudd	King Racing	Buick	450	104	running	72	$5,825
33	36	52	Jimmy Means	Jimmy Means Racing	Pontiac	448	0	running	64	$2,080
34	9	15	Brett Bodine	Bud Moore Engineering	Ford	407	0	cylinder head	61	$4,680
35	26	71	Dave Marcis	Marcis Auto Racing	Chevrolet	400	1	running	63	$4,605
36	40	41	Jim Bown	Bown Racing	Chevrolet	389	0	oil pump	0	$1,925
37	41	70	J. D. McDuffie	McDuffie Racing	Pontiac	384	0	oil pressure	52	$1,900
38	29	10	Ken Bouchard	Whitcomb Racing	Pontiac	299	0	valve	49	$3,475
39	21	55	Phil Parsons	Jackson Bros. Motorsports	Oldsmobile	294	0	engine	46	$3,850
40	20	34	Rodney Combs	AAG Racing	Buick	214	0	engine	43	$1,825
41	37	57	Hut Stricklin (R)	Osterlund Racing	Pontiac	115	0	crank	40	$1,825
42	31	51	Butch Miller (R)	Miller Racing	Chevrolet	50	0	engine	37	$1,825
Official race results

== Standings after the race ==
Drivers' Championship standings

	Pos	Driver	Points
2	1	Dale Earnhardt	335
2	2	Geoff Bodine	330 (-5)
4	3	Alan Kulwicki	326 (-9)
14	4	Rusty Wallace	294 (–41)
6	5	Sterling Marlin	276 (–59)
5	6	Ken Schrader	268 (–67)
1	7	Rick Wilson	259 (–76)
7	8	Darrell Waltrip	256 (–79)
3	9	Rick Mast	255 (–80)
1	10	Terry Labonte	252 (–83)
Official driver's standings

- Note: Only the first 10 positions are included for the driver standings.

Previous race: 1989 Daytona 500	NASCAR Winston Cup Series; 1989 season	Next race: 1989 Motorcraft Quality Parts 500
