= 1989 Motorcraft Quality Parts 500 =

Third race of the 1989 NASCAR Winston Cup Series

Race details
- Race 3 of 29 in the 1989 NASCAR Winston Cup Series
- The 1989 Motorcraft Quality Parts 500 program cover, featuring Bill Elliott.
- Date: March 19, 1989
- Official name: 30th Annual Motorcraft Quality Parts 500
- Location: Hampton, Georgia, Atlanta International Raceway
- Course: Permanent racing facility
- Course length: 1.522 miles (2.449 km)
- Distance: 328 laps, 499.216 mi (803.41 km)
- Scheduled distance: 328 laps, 499.216 mi (803.41 km)
- Average speed: 139.684 miles per hour (224.800 km/h)
- Attendance: 41,000

Pole position
Driver	Alan Kulwicki	AK Racing
- Time: 30.969

Most laps led
Driver	Rusty Wallace	Blue Max Racing
- Laps: 130

Winner
No. 17	Darrell Waltrip	Hendrick Motorsports

Television in the United States
- Network: ABC
- Announcers: Paul Page, Sam Posey, Bobby Unser

Radio in the United States
- Radio: Motor Racing Network

The 1989 Motorcraft Quality Parts 500 was the third stock car race of the 1989 NASCAR Winston Cup Series season and the 30th iteration of the event. The race was held on Sunday, March 19, 1989, before an audience of 41,000 in Hampton, Georgia, at Atlanta International Raceway, a 1.522 miles (2.449 km) permanent asphalt quad-oval intermediate speedway. The race took the scheduled 328 laps to complete. With the assist of a fast final pit-stop, Hendrick Motorsports driver Darrell Waltrip would manage to hold off the field on the final restart with nine laps left in the race to take his 75th career NASCAR Winston Cup Series victory and his second victory of the season. To fill out the top three, Richard Childress Racing driver Dale Earnhardt and Stavola Brothers Racing driver Dick Trickle would finish second and third, respectively.

== Background ==
The layout of Atlanta International Raceway, the circuit where the race was held.

Atlanta Motor Speedway (formerly Atlanta International Raceway) is a 1.522-mile race track in Hampton, Georgia, United States, 20 miles (32 km) south of Atlanta. It has annually hosted NASCAR Winston Cup Series stock car races since its inauguration in 1960.

The venue was bought by Speedway Motorsports in 1990. In 1994, 46 condominiums were built over the northeastern side of the track. In 1997, to standardize the track with Speedway Motorsports' other two intermediate ovals, the entire track was almost completely rebuilt. The frontstretch and backstretch were swapped, and the configuration of the track was changed from oval to quad-oval, with a new official length of 1.54-mile (2.48 km) where before it was 1.522-mile (2.449 km). The project made the track one of the fastest on the NASCAR circuit.

=== Entry list ===
- (R) - denotes rookie driver.

#	Driver	Team	Make	Sponsor
2	Ernie Irvan	U.S. Racing	Pontiac	Kroger
3	Dale Earnhardt	Richard Childress Racing	Chevrolet	GM Goodwrench Service Plus
4	Rick Wilson	Morgan–McClure Motorsports	Oldsmobile	Kodak
5	Geoff Bodine	Hendrick Motorsports	Chevrolet	Levi Garrett
6	Mark Martin	Roush Racing	Ford	Stroh's Light
7	Alan Kulwicki	AK Racing	Ford	Zerex
8	Bobby Hillin Jr.	Stavola Brothers Racing	Buick	Miller High Life
9	Bill Elliott	Melling Racing	Ford	Coors Light
10	Ken Bouchard	Whitcomb Racing	Pontiac	Whitcomb Racing
11	Terry Labonte	Junior Johnson & Associates	Ford	Budweiser
14	A. J. Foyt	A. J. Foyt Racing	Oldsmobile	Copenhagen
15	Brett Bodine	Bud Moore Engineering	Ford	Motorcraft
16	Larry Pearson (R)	Pearson Racing	Buick	Chattanooga Chew
17	Darrell Waltrip	Hendrick Motorsports	Chevrolet	Tide
18	Rick Jeffrey	Jeffrey Racing	Chevrolet	Jeffrey Racing
21	Neil Bonnett	Wood Brothers Racing	Ford	Citgo
23	Eddie Bierschwale	B&B Racing	Oldsmobile	Auto Finders
25	Ken Schrader	Hendrick Motorsports	Chevrolet	Folgers
26	Ricky Rudd	King Racing	Buick	Quaker State
27	Rusty Wallace	Blue Max Racing	Pontiac	Kodiak
28	Davey Allison	Robert Yates Racing	Ford	Texaco, Havoline
29	Dale Jarrett	Cale Yarborough Motorsports	Pontiac	Hardee's
30	Michael Waltrip	Bahari Racing	Pontiac	Country Time
31	Jim Sauter	Bob Clark Motorsports	Pontiac	Slender You Figure Salons
33	Harry Gant	Jackson Bros. Motorsports	Oldsmobile	Skoal Bandit
36	H. B. Bailey	Bailey Racing	Pontiac	Almeda Auto Parts
40	Ben Hess (R)	Hess Racing	Oldsmobile	Hess Racing
41	Jim Bown	Bown Racing	Chevrolet	Bown Racing
42	Kyle Petty	SABCO Racing	Pontiac	Peak Antifreeze
43	Richard Petty	Petty Enterprises	Pontiac	STP
48	Mickey Gibbs (R)	Winkle Motorsports	Pontiac	SmartLease
52	Jimmy Means	Jimmy Means Racing	Pontiac	Alka-Seltzer
55	Phil Parsons	Jackson Bros. Motorsports	Oldsmobile	Skoal, Crown Central Petroleum
57	Hut Stricklin (R)	Osterlund Racing	Pontiac	Heinz
66	Rick Mast (R)	Mach 1 Racing	Chevrolet	Banquet Foods
68	Derrike Cope	Testa Racing	Pontiac	Purolator
69	Lee Raymond	Raymond Racing	Ford	Raymond Racing
71	Dave Marcis	Marcis Auto Racing	Chevrolet	Lifebuoy
75	Morgan Shepherd	RahMoc Enterprises	Pontiac	Valvoline
80	Jimmy Horton	S&H Racing	Pontiac	Miles Concrete
83	Lake Speed	Speed Racing	Oldsmobile	Bull's-Eye Barbecue Sauce
84	Dick Trickle (R)	Stavola Brothers Racing	Buick	Miller High Life
88	Greg Sacks	Baker–Schiff Racing	Pontiac	Crisco
90	Chad Little (R)	Donlavey Racing	Ford	Donlavey Racing
93	Charlie Baker	Baker Racing	Chevrolet	Baker Racing
94	Sterling Marlin	Hagan Racing	Oldsmobile	Sunoco

== Qualifying ==
Qualifying was split into two rounds. The first round was held on Friday, March 17, at 2:00 PM EST. Each driver would have one lap to set a time. During the first round, the top 20 drivers in the round would be guaranteed a starting spot in the race. If a driver was not able to guarantee a spot in the first round, they had the option to scrub their time from the first round and try and run a faster lap time in a second round qualifying run, held on Saturday, March 18, at 10:30 AM EST. As with the first round, each driver would have one lap to set a time. For this specific race, positions 21-40 would be decided on time, and depending on who needed it, a select amount of positions were given to cars who had not otherwise qualified but were high enough in owner's points; up to two were given.

Alan Kulwicki, driving for his own AK Racing team, would win the pole, setting a time of 30.969 and an average speed of 176.925 miles per hour (284.733 km/h) in the first round.

Four drivers would fail to qualify.

=== Full qualifying results ===
Pos.	#	Driver	Team	Make	Time	Speed
1	7	Alan Kulwicki	AK Racing	Ford	30.969	176.925
2	6	Mark Martin	Roush Racing	Ford	31.000	176.748
3	27	Rusty Wallace	Blue Max Racing	Pontiac	31.136	175.976
4	17	Darrell Waltrip	Hendrick Motorsports	Chevrolet	31.228	175.458
5	3	Dale Earnhardt	Richard Childress Racing	Chevrolet	31.230	175.447
6	5	Geoff Bodine	Hendrick Motorsports	Chevrolet	31.305	175.026
7	33	Harry Gant	Jackson Bros. Motorsports	Oldsmobile	31.310	174.998
8	94	Sterling Marlin	Hagan Racing	Oldsmobile	31.314	174.976
9	28	Davey Allison	Robert Yates Racing	Ford	31.316	174.965
10	29	Dale Jarrett	Cale Yarborough Motorsports	Pontiac	31.413	174.425
11	11	Terry Labonte	Junior Johnson & Associates	Ford	31.447	174.236
12	15	Brett Bodine	Bud Moore Engineering	Ford	31.455	174.192
13	30	Michael Waltrip	Bahari Racing	Pontiac	31.457	174.181
14	83	Lake Speed	Speed Racing	Oldsmobile	31.470	174.109
15	26	Ricky Rudd	King Racing	Buick	31.492	173.987
16	9	Bill Elliott	Melling Racing	Ford	31.497	173.959
17	21	Neil Bonnett	Wood Brothers Racing	Ford	31.608	173.349
18	84	Dick Trickle (R)	Stavola Brothers Racing	Buick	31.622	173.272
19	75	Morgan Shepherd	RahMoc Enterprises	Pontiac	31.638	173.184
20	14	A. J. Foyt	A. J. Foyt Racing	Oldsmobile	31.638	173.184
Failed to lock in Round 1
21	25	Ken Schrader	Hendrick Motorsports	Chevrolet	31.237	175.407
22	88	Greg Sacks	Baker–Schiff Racing	Pontiac	31.507	173.904
23	42	Kyle Petty	SABCO Racing	Pontiac	31.527	173.794
24	43	Richard Petty	Petty Enterprises	Pontiac	31.692	172.889
25	55	Phil Parsons	Jackson Bros. Motorsports	Oldsmobile	31.706	172.813
26	68	Derrike Cope	Testa Racing	Pontiac	31.729	172.687
27	2	Ernie Irvan	U.S. Racing	Pontiac	31.742	172.617
28	66	Rick Mast (R)	Mach 1 Racing	Chevrolet	31.790	172.356
29	8	Bobby Hillin Jr.	Stavola Brothers Racing	Buick	31.795	172.329
30	40	Ben Hess (R)	Hess Racing	Oldsmobile	31.797	172.318
31	71	Dave Marcis	Marcis Auto Racing	Chevrolet	31.811	172.242
32	4	Rick Wilson	Morgan–McClure Motorsports	Oldsmobile	31.850	172.031
33	90	Chad Little (R)	Donlavey Racing	Ford	31.879	171.875
34	31	Jim Sauter	Bob Clark Motorsports	Pontiac	31.950	171.493
35	57	Hut Stricklin (R)	Osterlund Racing	Pontiac	31.990	171.279
36	52	Jimmy Means	Jimmy Means Racing	Pontiac	32.017	171.134
37	41	Jim Bown	Bown Racing	Chevrolet	32.103	170.676
38	16	Larry Pearson (R)	Pearson Racing	Buick	32.182	170.257
39	10	Ken Bouchard	Whitcomb Racing	Pontiac	32.236	169.971
40	80	Jimmy Horton	S&H Racing	Pontiac	32.256	169.866
Provisionals
41	23	Eddie Bierschwale	B&B Racing	Oldsmobile	33.047	165.800
42	48	Mickey Gibbs (R)	Winkle Motorsports	Pontiac	33.687	162.650
Failed to qualify
43	18	Rick Jeffrey	Jeffrey Racing	Chevrolet	-*	-*
44	36	H. B. Bailey	Bailey Racing	Pontiac	-*	-*
45	69	Lee Raymond	Raymond Racing	Ford	-*	-*
46	93	Charlie Baker	Baker Racing	Chevrolet	-*	-*
Official first round qualifying results
Official starting lineup

== Race results ==
Fin	St	#	Driver	Team	Make	Laps	Led	Status	Pts	Winnings
1	4	17	Darrell Waltrip	Hendrick Motorsports	Chevrolet	328	29	running	180	$63,500
2	5	3	Dale Earnhardt	Richard Childress Racing	Chevrolet	328	92	running	175	$39,675
3	18	84	Dick Trickle (R)	Stavola Brothers Racing	Buick	328	15	running	170	$30,250
4	23	42	Kyle Petty	SABCO Racing	Pontiac	327	0	running	160	$13,250
5	8	94	Sterling Marlin	Hagan Racing	Oldsmobile	326	0	running	155	$22,500
6	32	4	Rick Wilson	Morgan–McClure Motorsports	Oldsmobile	326	0	running	150	$16,325
7	17	21	Neil Bonnett	Wood Brothers Racing	Ford	325	0	running	146	$11,350
8	35	57	Hut Stricklin (R)	Osterlund Racing	Pontiac	324	0	running	142	$8,525
9	10	29	Dale Jarrett	Cale Yarborough Motorsports	Pontiac	324	0	running	138	$11,200
10	19	75	Morgan Shepherd	RahMoc Enterprises	Pontiac	323	0	running	134	$15,500
11	16	9	Bill Elliott	Melling Racing	Ford	323	0	running	130	$15,295
12	27	2	Ernie Irvan	U.S. Racing	Pontiac	323	0	running	127	$7,525
13	40	80	Jimmy Horton	S&H Racing	Pontiac	320	0	running	124	$5,562
14	25	55	Phil Parsons	Jackson Bros. Motorsports	Oldsmobile	319	3	running	126	$7,655
15	21	25	Ken Schrader	Hendrick Motorsports	Chevrolet	316	28	running	123	$13,455
16	1	7	Alan Kulwicki	AK Racing	Ford	316	0	running	115	$11,195
17	30	40	Ben Hess (R)	Hess Racing	Oldsmobile	315	0	running	112	$4,705
18	36	52	Jimmy Means	Jimmy Means Racing	Pontiac	314	0	running	109	$4,375
19	6	5	Geoff Bodine	Hendrick Motorsports	Chevrolet	312	2	accident	111	$10,265
20	13	30	Michael Waltrip	Bahari Racing	Pontiac	310	0	running	103	$8,070
21	14	83	Lake Speed	Speed Racing	Oldsmobile	306	0	running	100	$6,085
22	38	16	Larry Pearson (R)	Pearson Racing	Buick	300	0	running	97	$3,400
23	41	23	Eddie Bierschwale	B&B Racing	Oldsmobile	278	0	running	94	$2,815
24	15	26	Ricky Rudd	King Racing	Buick	270	0	engine	91	$5,730
25	28	66	Rick Mast (R)	Mach 1 Racing	Chevrolet	262	0	engine	88	$5,820
26	22	88	Greg Sacks	Baker–Schiff Racing	Pontiac	257	0	engine	85	$5,455
27	24	43	Richard Petty	Petty Enterprises	Pontiac	257	9	engine	87	$3,295
28	20	14	A. J. Foyt	A. J. Foyt Racing	Oldsmobile	254	0	engine	79	$2,510
29	7	33	Harry Gant	Jackson Bros. Motorsports	Oldsmobile	240	0	running	76	$2,475
30	29	8	Bobby Hillin Jr.	Stavola Brothers Racing	Buick	233	0	engine	73	$5,140
31	3	27	Rusty Wallace	Blue Max Racing	Pontiac	217	130	engine	80	$23,110
32	34	31	Jim Sauter	Bob Clark Motorsports	Pontiac	166	0	engine	67	$3,075
33	12	15	Brett Bodine	Bud Moore Engineering	Ford	164	1	accident	69	$4,925
34	26	68	Derrike Cope	Testa Racing	Pontiac	160	0	accident	61	$2,250
35	33	90	Chad Little (R)	Donlavey Racing	Ford	101	0	camshaft	58	$2,855
36	11	11	Terry Labonte	Junior Johnson & Associates	Ford	97	3	engine	60	$9,205
37	39	10	Ken Bouchard	Whitcomb Racing	Pontiac	56	0	overheating	52	$3,785
38	2	6	Mark Martin	Roush Racing	Ford	48	16	engine	54	$4,165
39	42	48	Mickey Gibbs (R)	Winkle Motorsports	Pontiac	30	0	engine	46	$2,140
40	9	28	Davey Allison	Robert Yates Racing	Ford	19	0	engine	43	$10,660
41	37	41	Jim Bown	Bown Racing	Chevrolet	10	0	engine	40	$2,060
42	31	71	Dave Marcis	Marcis Auto Racing	Chevrolet	9	0	engine	37	$4,060
Failed to qualify
43		18	Rick Jeffrey	Jeffrey Racing	Chevrolet					
44		36	H. B. Bailey	Bailey Racing	Pontiac					
45		69	Lee Raymond	Raymond Racing	Ford					
46		93	Charlie Baker	Baker Racing	Chevrolet					
Official race results

== Standings after the race ==
Drivers' Championship standings

	Pos	Driver	Points
	1	Dale Earnhardt	510
1	2	Alan Kulwicki	441 (-69)
1	3	Geoff Bodine	441 (-69)
4	4	Darrell Waltrip	436 (–74)
	5	Sterling Marlin	431 (–79)
1	6	Rick Wilson	409 (–101)
1	7	Ken Schrader	391 (–119)
4	8	Rusty Wallace	374 (–136)
	9	Rick Mast	343 (–167)
10	10	Dale Jarrett	340 (–170)
Official driver's standings

- Note: Only the first 10 positions are included for the driver standings.

Previous race: 1989 Goodwrench 500	NASCAR Winston Cup Series; 1989 season	Next race: 1989 Pontiac Excitement 400
