= 1988 Miller High Life 400 (Richmond) =

22nd race of the 1988 NASCAR Winston Cup Series

Race details
- Race 22 of 29 in the 1988 NASCAR Winston Cup Series
- The 1988 Miller Genuine Draft 400 program cover, featuring Bobby Hillin Jr. and Bobby Allison. Artwork by NASCAR artist Sam Bass.
- Date: September 11, 1988
- Official name: 31st Annual Miller High Life 400
- Location: Richmond, Virginia, Richmond International Raceway
- Course: Permanent racing facility
- Course length: 0.75 miles (1.21 km)
- Distance: 400 laps, 300 mi (482.803 km)
- Average speed: 95.77 miles per hour (154.13 km/h)
- Attendance: 60,000

Pole position
Driver	Davey Allison	Ranier-Lundy Racing
- Time: 21.978

Most laps led
Driver	Davey Allison	Ranier-Lundy Racing
- Laps: 262

Winner
No. 28	Davey Allison	Ranier-Lundy Racing

Television in the United States
- Network: TBS
- Announcers: Ken Squier, Johnny Hayes

Radio in the United States
- Radio: Motor Racing Network

The 1988 Miller High Life 400 was the 22nd stock car race of the 1988 NASCAR Winston Cup Series season and the 31st iteration of the event. The race was held on Sunday, September 11, 1988, before an audience of 60,000 in Richmond, Virginia, at Richmond International Raceway, a 0.75 miles (1.21 km) D-shaped oval. The race took the scheduled 400 laps to complete. At race's end, Ranier-Lundy Racing's Davey Allison would manage to dominate the majority of the race, leading 262 laps to take his fourth career NASCAR Winston Cup Series victory and his second and final victory of the season. To fill out the top three, Richard Childress Racing's Dale Earnhardt and Junior Johnson & Associates' Terry Labonte would finish second and third, respectively.

The race was the first ever race at the newly built Richmond International Raceway, a track that replaced the old Richmond Fairgrounds Raceway.

== Background ==
The layout of Richmond International Raceway, the venue where the race was at.

Richmond International Raceway (RIR) is a 3/4-mile (1.2 km), D-shaped, asphalt race track located just outside Richmond, Virginia in Henrico County. It hosts the Monster Energy NASCAR Cup Series and Xfinity Series. Known as "America's premier short track", it formerly hosted a NASCAR Camping World Truck Series race, an IndyCar Series race, and two USAC sprint car races.

=== Entry list ===
- (R) denotes rookie driver.

#	Driver	Team	Make	Sponsor
2	Ernie Irvan (R)	U.S. Racing	Chevrolet	Kroger
3	Dale Earnhardt	Richard Childress Racing	Chevrolet	GM Goodwrench Service
4	Rick Wilson	Morgan–McClure Motorsports	Oldsmobile	Kodak
5	Geoff Bodine	Hendrick Motorsports	Chevrolet	Levi Garrett
6	Mark Martin	Roush Racing	Ford	Stroh Light
7	Alan Kulwicki	AK Racing	Ford	Zerex
8	Bobby Hillin Jr.	Stavola Brothers Racing	Buick	Miller High Life
9	Bill Elliott	Melling Racing	Ford	Coors Light
10	Ken Bouchard (R)	Whitcomb Racing	Ford	Whitcomb Racing
11	Terry Labonte	Junior Johnson & Associates	Chevrolet	Budweiser
12	Mike Alexander	Stavola Brothers Racing	Buick	Miller High Life
15	Brett Bodine	Bud Moore Engineering	Ford	Crisco
17	Darrell Waltrip	Hendrick Motorsports	Chevrolet	Tide
20	Rayven Clark	Zieglar Racing	Chevrolet	Zieglar Racing
21	Kyle Petty	Wood Brothers Racing	Ford	Citgo
23	Eddie Bierschwale	B&B Racing	Oldsmobile	Wayne Paging
25	Ken Schrader	Hendrick Motorsports	Chevrolet	Folgers
26	Ricky Rudd	King Racing	Buick	Quaker State
27	Rusty Wallace	Blue Max Racing	Pontiac	Kodiak
28	Davey Allison	Ranier-Lundy Racing	Ford	Havoline
29	Dale Jarrett	Cale Yarborough Motorsports	Oldsmobile	Hardee's
30	Michael Waltrip	Bahari Racing	Pontiac	Country Time
31	Jim Sauter	Bob Clark Motorsports	Oldsmobile	Slender You Figure Salons
32	Lee Faulk	Bob Clark Motorsports	Oldsmobile	Slender You Figure Salons
33	Harry Gant	Mach 1 Racing	Chevrolet	Skoal Bandit
37	Randy Morrison	Morrison Racing	Ford	Morrison Racing
40	Ben Hess	Hess Racing	Oldsmobile	Hess Racing
43	Richard Petty	Petty Enterprises	Pontiac	STP
44	Sterling Marlin	Hagan Racing	Oldsmobile	Piedmont Airlines
52	Jimmy Means	Jimmy Means Racing	Pontiac	Eureka
54	Lennie Pond	Gray Racing	Chevrolet	Heritage Chevrolet
55	Phil Parsons	Jackson Bros. Motorsports	Oldsmobile	Crown Central Petroleum, Skoal Classic
57	Morgan Shepherd	Osterlund Racing	Buick	Heinz Ketchup
66	Bob Schacht	Reet Racing	Buick	Reet Racing
67	Ron Esau	Arrington Racing	Ford	Pannill Sweatshirts
68	Derrike Cope	Testa Racing	Ford	Purolator Filters
70	J. D. McDuffie	McDuffie Racing	Pontiac	Rumple Furniture
71	Dave Marcis	Marcis Auto Racing	Chevrolet	Lifebuoy
75	Neil Bonnett	RahMoc Enterprises	Pontiac	Valvoline
78	Jay Sommers	Sommers Racing	Chevrolet	Doe & Associates
83	Lake Speed	Speed Racing	Oldsmobile	Wynn's, Kmart
88	Greg Sacks	Baker-Schiff Racing	Oldsmobile	Red Baron Frozen Pizza
90	Benny Parsons	Donlavey Racing	Ford	Bull's-Eye Barbecue Sauce
97	Rodney Combs	Winkle Motorsports	Buick	AC Spark Plug
98	Brad Noffsinger (R)	Curb Racing	Buick	Sunoco

== Qualifying ==
Qualifying was originally scheduled to be split into two rounds. The first round was scheduled to be held on Friday, September 9, at 3:00 PM EST. Originally, the first 20 positions were going to be determined by first round qualifying, with positions 21-30 meant to be determined the following day on Saturday, September 10. However, due to rain, the first round was cancelled. As a result, qualifying was condensed into one round for all starting grid spots in the race, which was run on Saturday. Depending on who needed it, a select amount of positions were given to cars who had not otherwise qualified but were high enough in owner's points; up to two were given.

Davey Allison, driving for Ranier-Lundy Racing, would win the pole, setting a time of 21.978 and an average speed of 122.850 miles per hour (197.708 km/h).

The starting lineup was drastically changed due to consequences of an ongoing tire war between the Goodyear Tire and Rubber Company and Hoosier Racing Tire. A rule implemented at the time stated that if a driver who had managed to qualify for a race changed tire brands between the qualifying session and the race, the driver was forced to forfeit their starting position and start at the rear. Around half of qualified drivers decided to switch tire brands, all of them forfeiting their original starting positions. The decision was regarded as unprecedented. The lineup is still disputed to this day, as NASCAR officials at the time were still in dispute over the correct order of the official starting lineup at the start of the race.

Nine drivers would fail to qualify.

=== Full qualifying results (disputed) ===
Pos.	#	Driver	Team	Make	Time	Speed
1	28	Davey Allison	Ranier-Lundy Racing	Ford	21.978	122.850
2	12	Mike Alexander	Stavola Brothers Racing	Buick	22.150	121.896
3	4	Rick Wilson	Morgan–McClure Motorsports	Oldsmobile	22.162	121.830
4	25	Ken Schrader	Hendrick Motorsports	Chevrolet	22.251	121.343
5	31	Butch Miller	Bob Clark Motorsports	Oldsmobile	22.296	121.098
6	30	Michael Waltrip	Bahari Racing	Pontiac	22.256	121.316
7	15	Brett Bodine	Bud Moore Engineering	Ford	22.407	120.498
8	88	Greg Sacks	Baker–Schiff Racing	Oldsmobile	22.284	121.163
9	97	Rodney Combs	Winkle Motorsports	Buick	22.545	119.760
10	90	Benny Parsons	Donlavey Racing	Ford	22.343	120.843
11	8	Bobby Hillin Jr.	Stavola Brothers Racing	Buick	22.668	119.111
12	26	Ricky Rudd	King Racing	Buick	22.373	120.681
13	71	Dave Marcis	Marcis Auto Racing	Chevrolet	-	-
14	32	Lee Faulk	Bob Clark Motorsports	Oldsmobile	22.539	119.792
15	10	Ken Bouchard (R)	Whitcomb Racing	Ford	22.705	118.917
16	33	Harry Gant	Mach 1 Racing	Chevrolet	22.547	119.750
17	23	Eddie Bierschwale	B&B Racing	Oldsmobile	-	-
18	66	Bob Schacht	Reet Racing	Buick	22.630	119.311
Forfeit starting positions
19	3	Dale Earnhardt	Richard Childress Racing	Chevrolet	22.384	120.622
20	9	Bill Elliott	Melling Racing	Ford	22.083	122.266
21	27	Rusty Wallace	Blue Max Racing	Pontiac	22.253	121.332
22	11	Terry Labonte	Junior Johnson & Associates	Chevrolet	22.389	120.595
23	5	Geoff Bodine	Hendrick Motorsports	Chevrolet	22.274	121.218
24	44	Sterling Marlin	Hagan Racing	Oldsmobile	22.319	120.973
25	17	Darrell Waltrip	Hendrick Motorsports	Chevrolet	22.116	122.084
26	55	Phil Parsons	Jackson Bros. Motorsports	Oldsmobile	22.604	119.448
27	21	Kyle Petty	Wood Brothers Racing	Ford	22.352	120.795
28	6	Mark Martin	Roush Racing	Ford	22.105	122.144
29	75	Neil Bonnett	RahMoc Enterprises	Pontiac	22.591	119.517
30	83	Lake Speed	Speed Racing	Oldsmobile	22.316	120.989
31	7	Alan Kulwicki	AK Racing	Ford	22.070	122.338
32	43	Richard Petty	Petty Enterprises	Pontiac	22.508	119.957
33	29	Dale Jarrett	Cale Yarborough Motorsports	Oldsmobile	22.500	120.000
34	57	Morgan Shepherd	Osterlund Racing	Buick	22.447	120.283
35	2	Ernie Irvan (R)	U.S. Racing	Pontiac	22.516	119.915
36	52	Jimmy Means	Jimmy Means Racing	Pontiac	22.553	119.718
Failed to qualify (results unknown)
37	20	Rayven Clark	Zieglar Racing	Chevrolet	-*	-*
38	37	Randy Morrison	Morrison Racing	Ford	-*	-*
39	40	Ben Hess	Hess Racing	Oldsmobile	-*	-*
40	54	Lennie Pond	Gray Racing	Chevrolet	-*	-*
41	67	Ron Esau	Arrington Racing	Ford	-*	-*
42	68	Derrike Cope	Testa Racing	Ford	-*	-*
43	70	J. D. McDuffie	McDuffie Racing	Pontiac	-*	-*
44	78	Jay Sommers	Sommers Racing	Chevrolet	-*	-*
45	98	Brad Noffsinger (R)	Curb Racing	Buick	-*	-*
Official starting lineup

== Race results ==
Fin	St	#	Driver	Team	Make	Laps	Led	Status	Pts	Winnings
1	1	28	Davey Allison	Ranier-Lundy Racing	Ford	400	262	running	185	$57,800
2	19	3	Dale Earnhardt	Richard Childress Racing	Chevrolet	400	78	running	175	$29,625
3	22	11	Terry Labonte	Junior Johnson & Associates	Chevrolet	400	5	running	170	$20,525
4	28	6	Mark Martin	Roush Racing	Ford	400	0	running	160	$10,925
5	31	7	Alan Kulwicki	AK Racing	Ford	400	0	running	155	$15,825
6	27	21	Kyle Petty	Wood Brothers Racing	Ford	399	0	running	150	$10,400
7	20	9	Bill Elliott	Melling Racing	Ford	399	1	running	151	$11,600
8	25	17	Darrell Waltrip	Hendrick Motorsports	Chevrolet	398	0	running	142	$9,100
9	29	75	Neil Bonnett	RahMoc Enterprises	Pontiac	398	0	running	138	$8,900
10	13	71	Dave Marcis	Marcis Auto Racing	Chevrolet	397	0	running	134	$8,600
11	7	15	Brett Bodine	Bud Moore Engineering	Ford	397	0	running	130	$10,070
12	6	30	Michael Waltrip	Bahari Racing	Pontiac	397	0	running	127	$6,000
13	8	88	Greg Sacks	Baker–Schiff Racing	Oldsmobile	396	0	running	0	$5,750
14	11	8	Bobby Hillin Jr.	Stavola Brothers Racing	Buick	396	0	running	121	$5,160
15	33	29	Dale Jarrett	Cale Yarborough Motorsports	Oldsmobile	395	0	running	118	$4,430
16	24	44	Sterling Marlin	Hagan Racing	Oldsmobile	394	0	running	115	$5,130
17	2	12	Mike Alexander	Stavola Brothers Racing	Buick	394	22	running	117	$7,975
18	4	25	Ken Schrader	Hendrick Motorsports	Chevrolet	393	0	running	109	$8,865
19	15	10	Ken Bouchard (R)	Whitcomb Racing	Ford	392	0	running	106	$4,050
20	10	90	Benny Parsons	Donlavey Racing	Ford	392	0	running	103	$5,275
21	9	97	Rodney Combs	Winkle Motorsports	Buick	392	0	running	100	$2,020
22	23	5	Geoff Bodine	Hendrick Motorsports	Chevrolet	390	0	running	97	$4,315
23	14	32	Lee Faulk	Bob Clark Motorsports	Oldsmobile	388	0	running	0	$1,920
24	26	55	Phil Parsons	Jackson Bros. Motorsports	Oldsmobile	361	0	running	91	$4,175
25	5	31	Butch Miller	Bob Clark Motorsports	Oldsmobile	352	18	axle	0	$2,730
26	12	26	Ricky Rudd	King Racing	Buick	349	14	engine	90	$5,010
27	17	23	Eddie Bierschwale	B&B Racing	Oldsmobile	339	0	engine	82	$1,760
28	35	2	Ernie Irvan (R)	U.S. Racing	Pontiac	292	0	engine	79	$1,990
29	36	52	Jimmy Means	Jimmy Means Racing	Pontiac	259	0	fatigue	76	$3,210
30	18	66	Bob Schacht	Reet Racing	Buick	138	0	brakes	0	$1,650
31	34	57	Morgan Shepherd	Osterlund Racing	Buick	59	0	handling	70	$1,590
32	16	33	Harry Gant	Mach 1 Racing	Chevrolet	36	0	crash	67	$3,710
33	3	4	Rick Wilson	Morgan–McClure Motorsports	Oldsmobile	36	0	engine	64	$2,150
34	32	43	Richard Petty	Petty Enterprises	Pontiac	26	0	crash	61	$2,900
35	21	27	Rusty Wallace	Blue Max Racing	Pontiac	18	0	crash	58	$9,650
36	30	83	Lake Speed	Speed Racing	Oldsmobile	11	0	crash	55	$1,400
Failed to qualify (results unknown)
37		20	Rayven Clark	Zieglar Racing	Chevrolet					
38		37	Randy Morrison	Morrison Racing	Ford					
39		40	Ben Hess	Hess Racing	Oldsmobile					
40		54	Lennie Pond	Gray Racing	Chevrolet					
41		67	Ron Esau	Arrington Racing	Ford					
42		68	Derrike Cope	Testa Racing	Ford					
43		70	J. D. McDuffie	McDuffie Racing	Pontiac					
44		78	Jay Sommers	Sommers Racing	Chevrolet					
45		98	Brad Noffsinger (R)	Curb Racing	Buick					
Official race results

== Standings after the race ==
Drivers' Championship standings

	Pos	Driver	Points
	1	Bill Elliott	3,363
1	2	Dale Earnhardt	3,246 (-117)
1	3	Rusty Wallace	3,244 (-119)
1	4	Terry Labonte	2,966 (–397)
1	5	Ken Schrader	2,941 (–422)
	6	Geoff Bodine	2,888 (–475)
	7	Sterling Marlin	2,819 (–544)
	8	Darrell Waltrip	2,811 (–552)
	9	Phil Parsons	2,752 (–611)
	10	Davey Allison	2,694 (–669)
Official driver's standings

- Note: Only the first 10 positions are included for the driver standings.

Previous race: 1988 Southern 500	NASCAR Winston Cup Series; 1988 season	Next race: 1988 Delaware 500
