= 1988 AC Spark Plug 500 =

16th race of the 1988 NASCAR Winston Cup Series

Race details
- Race 16 of 29 in the 1988 NASCAR Winston Cup Series
- The 1988 AC Spark Plug 500 program cover.
- Date: July 24, 1988
- Official name: 16th Annual AC Spark Plug 500
- Location: Long Pond, Pennsylvania, Pocono Raceway
- Course: Permanent racing facility
- Course length: 2.5 miles (4.0 km)
- Distance: 200 laps, 500 mi (804.672 km)
- Scheduled distance: 200 laps, 500 mi (804.672 km)
- Average speed: 122.866 miles per hour (197.734 km/h)
- Attendance: 70,000

Pole position
Driver	Morgan Shepherd	RahMoc Enterprises
- Time: 57.269

Most laps led
Driver	Bill Elliott	Melling Racing
- Laps: 122

Winner
No. 9	Bill Elliott	Melling Racing

Television in the United States
- Network: Viewer's Choice (PPV)
- Announcers: Mike Joy, Ron Bouchard

Radio in the United States
- Radio: Motor Racing Network

The 1988 AC Spark Plug 500 was the 16th stock car race of the 1988 NASCAR Winston Cup Series season and the 16th iteration of the event. The race was held on Sunday, July 24, 1988, before an audience of 70,000 in Long Pond, Pennsylvania, at Pocono Raceway, a 2.5 miles (4.0 km) triangular permanent course. The race took the scheduled 200 laps to complete. At race's end, Melling Racing driver Bill Elliott would manage to dominate a majority of the race, leading 122 laps to take his 27th career NASCAR Winston Cup Series victory and his fourth victory of the season. To fill out the top three, Hendrick Motorsports driver Ken Schrader and Ranier-Lundy Racing driver Davey Allison would finish second and third, respectively. This would also be the first televised NASCAR race to exclusively air on pay-per-view.

== Background ==
The layout of Pocono International Raceway, the venue where the race was held.

The race was held at Pocono International Raceway, which is a three-turn superspeedway located in Long Pond, Pennsylvania. The track hosts two annual NASCAR Sprint Cup Series races, as well as one Xfinity Series and Camping World Truck Series event. Until 2019, the track also hosted an IndyCar Series race.

Pocono International Raceway is one of a very few NASCAR tracks not owned by either Speedway Motorsports, Inc. or International Speedway Corporation. It is operated by the Igdalsky siblings Brandon, Nicholas, and sister Ashley, and cousins Joseph IV and Chase Mattioli, all of whom are third-generation members of the family-owned Mattco Inc, started by Joseph II and Rose Mattioli.

Outside of the NASCAR races, the track is used throughout the year by the Sports Car Club of America (SCCA) and motorcycle clubs as well as racing schools and an IndyCar race. The triangular oval also has three separate infield sections of racetrack – North Course, East Course and South Course. Each of these infield sections use a separate portion of the tri-oval to complete the track. During regular non-race weekends, multiple clubs can use the track by running on different infield sections. Also some of the infield sections can be run in either direction, or multiple infield sections can be put together – such as running the North Course and the South Course and using the tri-oval to connect the two.

=== Entry list ===
- (R) denotes rookie driver.

#	Driver	Team	Make	Sponsor
2	Ernie Irvan (R)	U.S. Racing	Chevrolet	Kroger
3	Dale Earnhardt	Richard Childress Racing	Chevrolet	GM Goodwrench Service
4	Rick Wilson	Morgan–McClure Motorsports	Oldsmobile	Kodak
5	Geoff Bodine	Hendrick Motorsports	Chevrolet	Levi Garrett
6	Mark Martin	Roush Racing	Ford	Stroh Light
7	Alan Kulwicki	AK Racing	Ford	Zerex
8	Bobby Hillin Jr.	Stavola Brothers Racing	Buick	Miller High Life
9	Bill Elliott	Melling Racing	Ford	Coors Light
10	Ken Bouchard (R)	Whitcomb Racing	Ford	Whitcomb Racing
11	Terry Labonte	Junior Johnson & Associates	Chevrolet	Budweiser
12	Mike Alexander	Stavola Brothers Racing	Buick	Miller High Life
15	Brett Bodine	Bud Moore Engineering	Ford	Crisco
16	Bob Schacht	Chilson Racing	Ford	Ed Learn Ford
17	Darrell Waltrip	Hendrick Motorsports	Chevrolet	Tide
21	Kyle Petty	Wood Brothers Racing	Ford	Citgo
23	Eddie Bierschwale	B&B Racing	Oldsmobile	Wayne Paging
25	Ken Schrader	Hendrick Motorsports	Chevrolet	Folgers
26	Ricky Rudd	King Racing	Buick	Quaker State
27	Rusty Wallace	Blue Max Racing	Pontiac	Kodiak
28	Davey Allison	Ranier-Lundy Racing	Ford	Havoline
29	Dale Jarrett	Cale Yarborough Motorsports	Oldsmobile	Hardee's
30	Michael Waltrip	Bahari Racing	Pontiac	Country Time
31	Joe Ruttman	Bob Clark Motorsports	Oldsmobile	Slender You Figure Salons
33	Harry Gant	Mach 1 Racing	Chevrolet	Skoal Bandit
40	Ben Hess	Hess Racing	Oldsmobile	Hess Racing
43	Richard Petty	Petty Enterprises	Pontiac	STP
44	Sterling Marlin	Hagan Racing	Oldsmobile	Piedmont Airlines
48	Tony Spanos	Hylton Motorsports	Buick	Hylton Motorsports
50	Greg Sacks	Dingman Brothers Racing	Pontiac	Dingman Brothers Racing
52	Jimmy Means	Jimmy Means Racing	Pontiac	Eureka
55	Phil Parsons	Jackson Bros. Motorsports	Oldsmobile	Crown Central Petroleum, Skoal Classic
64	Mike Potter	Potter Racing	Chevrolet	Bullfrog Knits
67	Ron Esau	Arrington Racing	Ford	Pannill Sweatshirts
68	Derrike Cope	Testa Racing	Ford	Purolator Filters
70	J. D. McDuffie	McDuffie Racing	Pontiac	Rumple Furniture
71	Dave Marcis	Marcis Auto Racing	Chevrolet	Lifebuoy
75	Morgan Shepherd	RahMoc Enterprises	Pontiac	Valvoline
80	Jimmy Horton (R)	S&H Racing	Ford	S&H Racing
83	Lake Speed	Speed Racing	Oldsmobile	Wynn's, Kmart
85	Bobby Gerhart	Bobby Gerhart Racing	Chevrolet	James Chevrolet
88	Buddy Baker	Baker-Schiff Racing	Oldsmobile	Red Baron Frozen Pizza
90	Benny Parsons	Donlavey Racing	Ford	Bull's-Eye Barbecue Sauce
93	Charlie Baker	Salmon Racing	Chevrolet	Salmon Racing
97	Rodney Combs	Winkle Motorsports	Buick	AC Spark Plug
98	Brad Noffsinger (R)	Curb Racing	Buick	Sunoco

== Qualifying ==
Qualifying was split into two rounds. The first round was held on Friday, July 22, at 3:00 p.m. EST. Each driver would have one lap to set a time. During the first round, the top 15 drivers in the round would be guaranteed a starting spot in the race. If a driver was not able to guarantee a spot in the first round, they had the option to scrub their time from the first round and try and run a faster lap time in a second round qualifying run, held on Saturday, July 23, at 10:30 a.m. EST. As with the first round, each driver would have one lap to set a time. For this specific race, positions 16-40 would be decided on time, and depending on who needed it, a select amount of positions were given to cars who had not otherwise qualified but were high enough in owner's points; up to two provisionals were given.

Morgan Shepherd, driving for RahMoc Enterprises, would win the pole, setting a time of 57.269 and an average speed of 157.153 miles per hour (252.913 km/h) in the first round.

Five drivers would fail to qualify.

=== Full qualifying results ===
Pos.	#	Driver	Team	Make	Time	Speed
1	75	Morgan Shepherd	RahMoc Enterprises	Pontiac	57.269	157.153
2	9	Bill Elliott	Melling Racing	Ford	57.485	156.563
3	7	Alan Kulwicki	AK Racing	Ford	57.496	156.533
4	25	Ken Schrader	Hendrick Motorsports	Chevrolet	57.613	156.215
5	5	Geoff Bodine	Hendrick Motorsports	Chevrolet	57.632	156.163
6	6	Mark Martin	Roush Racing	Ford	57.729	155.901
7	15	Brett Bodine	Bud Moore Engineering	Ford	57.857	155.556
8	44	Sterling Marlin	Hagan Racing	Oldsmobile	57.915	155.400
9	3	Dale Earnhardt	Richard Childress Racing	Chevrolet	57.927	155.368
10	17	Darrell Waltrip	Hendrick Motorsports	Chevrolet	57.985	155.213
11	27	Rusty Wallace	Blue Max Racing	Pontiac	58.019	155.122
12	28	Davey Allison	Ranier-Lundy Racing	Ford	58.049	155.041
13	4	Rick Wilson	Morgan–McClure Motorsports	Oldsmobile	58.094	154.921
14	50	Greg Sacks	Dingman Brothers Racing	Pontiac	58.148	154.777
15	43	Richard Petty	Petty Enterprises	Pontiac	58.211	154.610
Failed to lock in Round 1
16	83	Lake Speed	Speed Racing	Oldsmobile	57.743	155.863
17	11	Terry Labonte	Junior Johnson & Associates	Chevrolet	58.289	154.403
18	12	Mike Alexander	Stavola Brothers Racing	Buick	58.361	154.213
19	68	Derrike Cope	Testa Racing	Ford	58.378	154.168
20	21	Kyle Petty	Wood Brothers Racing	Ford	58.382	154.157
21	29	Dale Jarrett	Cale Yarborough Motorsports	Oldsmobile	58.450	153.978
22	97	Rodney Combs	Winkle Motorsports	Buick	58.463	153.944
23	33	Harry Gant	Mach 1 Racing	Chevrolet	58.567	153.670
24	30	Michael Waltrip	Bahari Racing	Pontiac	58.640	153.479
25	26	Ricky Rudd	King Racing	Buick	58.715	153.283
26	8	Bobby Hillin Jr.	Stavola Brothers Racing	Buick	58.716	153.280
27	23	Eddie Bierschwale	B&B Racing	Oldsmobile	58.842	152.952
28	31	Joe Ruttman	Bob Clark Motorsports	Oldsmobile	58.964	152.636
29	55	Phil Parsons	Jackson Bros. Motorsports	Oldsmobile	59.024	152.480
30	10	Ken Bouchard (R)	Whitcomb Racing	Ford	59.042	152.434
31	90	Benny Parsons	Donlavey Racing	Ford	59.075	152.349
32	88	Buddy Baker	Baker–Schiff Racing	Oldsmobile	59.150	152.156
33	71	Dave Marcis	Marcis Auto Racing	Chevrolet	59.185	152.066
34	2	Ernie Irvan (R)	U.S. Racing	Chevrolet	59.284	151.812
35	16	Bob Schacht	Chilson Racing	Ford	59.533	151.177
36	80	Jimmy Horton (R)	S&H Racing	Ford	59.557	151.116
37	98	Brad Noffsinger (R)	Curb Racing	Buick	59.573	151.075
38	52	Jimmy Means	Jimmy Means Racing	Pontiac	59.879	150.303
39	64	Mike Potter	Potter Racing	Chevrolet	1:00.033	149.918
40	85	Bobby Gerhart	Bobby Gerhart Racing	Chevrolet	1:01.512	146.313
Failed to qualify
41	67	Ron Esau	Arrington Racing	Ford	-*	-*
42	70	J. D. McDuffie	McDuffie Racing	Pontiac	-*	-*
43	40	Ben Hess	Hess Racing	Oldsmobile	-*	-*
44	48	Tony Spanos	Hylton Motorsports	Buick	-*	-*
45	93	Charlie Baker	Salmon Racing	Chevrolet	-*	-*
Official first round qualifying results
Official starting lineup

== Race results ==
Fin	St	#	Driver	Team	Make	Laps	Led	Status	Pts	Winnings
1	2	9	Bill Elliott	Melling Racing	Ford	200	122	running	185	$53,200
2	4	25	Ken Schrader	Hendrick Motorsports	Chevrolet	200	5	running	175	$30,725
3	12	28	Davey Allison	Ranier-Lundy Racing	Ford	200	0	running	165	$26,275
4	5	5	Geoff Bodine	Hendrick Motorsports	Chevrolet	200	28	running	165	$17,775
5	10	17	Darrell Waltrip	Hendrick Motorsports	Chevrolet	200	6	running	160	$17,925
6	1	75	Morgan Shepherd	RahMoc Enterprises	Pontiac	200	13	running	155	$16,600
7	6	6	Mark Martin	Roush Racing	Ford	200	0	running	146	$8,600
8	3	7	Alan Kulwicki	AK Racing	Ford	200	0	running	142	$11,425
9	17	11	Terry Labonte	Junior Johnson & Associates	Chevrolet	200	15	running	143	$13,775
10	23	33	Harry Gant	Mach 1 Racing	Chevrolet	200	8	running	139	$10,025
11	9	3	Dale Earnhardt	Richard Childress Racing	Chevrolet	200	0	running	130	$15,025
12	25	26	Ricky Rudd	King Racing	Buick	200	2	running	132	$7,875
13	13	4	Rick Wilson	Morgan–McClure Motorsports	Oldsmobile	200	0	running	124	$5,575
14	8	44	Sterling Marlin	Hagan Racing	Oldsmobile	199	0	running	121	$7,275
15	18	12	Mike Alexander	Stavola Brothers Racing	Buick	199	0	running	118	$10,875
16	30	10	Ken Bouchard (R)	Whitcomb Racing	Ford	198	0	running	115	$3,925
17	24	30	Michael Waltrip	Bahari Racing	Pontiac	198	0	running	112	$6,675
18	20	21	Kyle Petty	Wood Brothers Racing	Ford	198	0	running	109	$10,725
19	37	98	Brad Noffsinger (R)	Curb Racing	Buick	197	0	running	106	$3,100
20	7	15	Brett Bodine	Bud Moore Engineering	Ford	197	0	running	103	$11,875
21	26	8	Bobby Hillin Jr.	Stavola Brothers Racing	Buick	196	0	running	100	$5,925
22	34	2	Ernie Irvan (R)	U.S. Racing	Chevrolet	195	0	running	97	$2,525
23	32	88	Buddy Baker	Baker–Schiff Racing	Oldsmobile	195	0	running	94	$5,525
24	11	27	Rusty Wallace	Blue Max Racing	Pontiac	189	0	running	91	$11,175
25	21	29	Dale Jarrett	Cale Yarborough Motorsports	Oldsmobile	188	0	running	88	$3,425
26	40	85	Bobby Gerhart	Bobby Gerhart Racing	Chevrolet	187	0	running	85	$2,275
27	28	31	Joe Ruttman	Bob Clark Motorsports	Oldsmobile	166	0	steering	82	$3,175
28	15	43	Richard Petty	Petty Enterprises	Pontiac	161	1	engine	84	$6,525
29	36	80	Jimmy Horton (R)	S&H Racing	Ford	141	0	engine	76	$2,125
30	33	71	Dave Marcis	Marcis Auto Racing	Chevrolet	128	0	engine	73	$4,825
31	29	55	Phil Parsons	Jackson Bros. Motorsports	Oldsmobile	119	0	engine	70	$4,725
32	16	83	Lake Speed	Speed Racing	Oldsmobile	92	0	crash	67	$4,150
33	19	68	Derrike Cope	Testa Racing	Ford	91	0	crash	64	$5,550
34	14	50	Greg Sacks	Dingman Brothers Racing	Pontiac	91	0	suspension	61	$1,850
35	31	90	Benny Parsons	Donlavey Racing	Ford	90	0	engine	58	$4,425
36	22	97	Rodney Combs	Winkle Motorsports	Buick	78	0	engine	55	$1,750
37	39	64	Mike Potter	Potter Racing	Chevrolet	44	0	rear end	52	$1,700
38	27	23	Eddie Bierschwale	B&B Racing	Oldsmobile	34	0	engine	49	$1,675
39	38	52	Jimmy Means	Jimmy Means Racing	Pontiac	26	0	engine	46	$4,250
40	35	16	Bob Schacht	Chilson Racing	Ford	5	0	engine	43	$1,600
Failed to qualify
41		67	Ron Esau	Arrington Racing	Ford					
42		70	J. D. McDuffie	McDuffie Racing	Pontiac					
43		40	Ben Hess	Hess Racing	Oldsmobile					
44		48	Tony Spanos	Hylton Motorsports	Buick					
45		93	Charlie Baker	Salmon Racing	Chevrolet					
Official race results

== Standings after the race ==
Drivers' Championship standings

	Pos	Driver	Points
	1	Rusty Wallace	2,363
1	2	Bill Elliott	2,360 (-3)
1	3	Dale Earnhardt	2,315 (-48)
	4	Terry Labonte	2,188 (–175)
	5	Ken Schrader	2,151 (–212)
1	6	Geoff Bodine	2,094 (–269)
1	7	Darrell Waltrip	2,054 (–309)
2	8	Phil Parsons	2,002 (–361)
	9	Sterling Marlin	1,995 (–368)
	10	Bobby Hillin Jr.	1,947 (–416)
Official driver's standings

- Note: Only the first 10 positions are included for the driver standings.

Previous race: 1988 Pepsi Firecracker 400	NASCAR Winston Cup Series; 1988 season	Next race: 1988 Talladega DieHard 500
