= 1989 Winston 500 =

Ninth race of the 1989 NASCAR Winston Cup Series

Race details
- Race 9 of 29 in the 1989 NASCAR Winston Cup Series
- The 1989 Winston 500 program cover, featuring Phil Parsons.
- Date: May 7, 1989
- Official name: 20th Annual Winston 500
- Location: Lincoln, Alabama, Alabama International Motor Speedway
- Course: Permanent racing facility
- Course length: 2.66 miles (4.28 km)
- Distance: 188 laps, 500.08 mi (804.8 km)
- Scheduled distance: 188 laps, 500.08 mi (804.8 km)
- Average speed: 155.869 miles per hour (250.847 km/h)
- Attendance: 140,000

Pole position
Driver	Mark Martin	Roush Racing
- Time: 49.601

Most laps led
Driver	Davey Allison	Robert Yates Racing
- Laps: 94

Winner
No. 28	Davey Allison	Robert Yates Racing

Television in the United States
- Network: ESPN
- Announcers: Bob Jenkins, Ned Jarrett, Benny Parsons

Radio in the United States
- Radio: Motor Racing Network

The 1989 Winston 500 was the ninth stock car race of the 1989 NASCAR Winston Cup Series season and the 20th iteration of the event. The race was held on Sunday, May 7, 1989, before an audience of 140,000 in Lincoln, Alabama at Alabama International Motor Speedway, a 2.66 miles (4.28 km) permanent triangle-shaped superspeedway. The race took the scheduled 188 laps to complete. In the final laps of the race, Robert Yates Racing driver Davey Allison would make a late-race charge to the lead, passing for the lead with nine laps left in the race to take his fifth career NASCAR Winston Cup Series victory and his first victory of the season. To fill out the top three, Junior Johnson & Associates driver Terry Labonte and Roush Racing driver Mark Martin would finish second and third, respectively.

== Background ==
The layout of Talladega Superspeedway, the venue where the race was held.

Talladega Superspeedway, originally known as Alabama International Motor Superspeedway (AIMS), is a motorsports complex located north of Talladega, Alabama. It is located on the former Anniston Air Force Base in the small city of Lincoln. The track is a tri-oval and was constructed in the 1960s by the International Speedway Corporation, a business controlled by the France family. Talladega is most known for its steep banking and the unique location of the start/finish line that's located just past the exit to pit road. The track currently hosts the NASCAR series such as the NASCAR Cup Series, Xfinity Series and the Camping World Truck Series. Talladega is the longest NASCAR oval, a 2.66-mile-long (4.28 km) tri-oval like the Daytona International Speedway, which also is a 2.5-mile-long (4.0 km) tri-oval.

=== Entry list ===
- (R) denotes rookie driver.

#	Driver	Team	Make
0	Delma Cowart	H. L. Waters Racing	Ford
2	Ernie Irvan	U.S. Racing	Pontiac
3	Dale Earnhardt	Richard Childress Racing	Chevrolet
4	Rick Wilson	Morgan–McClure Motorsports	Oldsmobile
5	Geoff Bodine	Hendrick Motorsports	Chevrolet
6	Mark Martin	Roush Racing	Ford
7	Alan Kulwicki	AK Racing	Ford
8	Bobby Hillin Jr.	Stavola Brothers Racing	Buick
9	Bill Elliott	Melling Racing	Ford
10	Derrike Cope	Whitcomb Racing	Pontiac
11	Terry Labonte	Junior Johnson & Associates	Ford
14	A. J. Foyt	A. J. Foyt Racing	Oldsmobile
15	Brett Bodine	Bud Moore Engineering	Ford
16	Larry Pearson (R)	Pearson Racing	Buick
17	Darrell Waltrip	Hendrick Motorsports	Chevrolet
18	Ron Esau	TriStar Motorsports	Pontiac
21	Neil Bonnett	Wood Brothers Racing	Ford
22	Grant Adcox	Adcox Racing	Chevrolet
23	Eddie Bierschwale	B&B Racing	Oldsmobile
25	Ken Schrader	Hendrick Motorsports	Chevrolet
26	Ricky Rudd	King Racing	Buick
27	Rusty Wallace	Blue Max Racing	Pontiac
28	Davey Allison	Robert Yates Racing	Ford
29	Dale Jarrett	Cale Yarborough Motorsports	Pontiac
30	Michael Waltrip	Bahari Racing	Pontiac
31	Jim Sauter	Bob Clark Motorsports	Pontiac
33	Harry Gant	Jackson Bros. Motorsports	Oldsmobile
40	Ben Hess (R)	Hess Racing	Oldsmobile
42	Kyle Petty	SABCO Racing	Pontiac
43	Richard Petty	Petty Enterprises	Pontiac
49	Tony Spanos	Hylton Motorsports	Buick
52	Jimmy Means	Jimmy Means Racing	Pontiac
55	Phil Parsons	Jackson Bros. Motorsports	Oldsmobile
57	Hut Stricklin (R)	Osterlund Racing	Pontiac
70	J. D. McDuffie	McDuffie Racing	Pontiac
71	Dave Marcis	Marcis Auto Racing	Chevrolet
73	Phil Barkdoll	Barkdoll Racing	Oldsmobile
75	Morgan Shepherd	RahMoc Enterprises	Pontiac
80	Jimmy Horton	S&H Racing	Pontiac
83	Lake Speed	Speed Racing	Oldsmobile
84	Dick Trickle (R)	Stavola Brothers Racing	Buick
86	Walter Surma	Surma Racing	Chevrolet
88	Greg Sacks	Baker–Schiff Racing	Pontiac
90	Chad Little (R)	Donlavey Racing	Ford
93	Charlie Baker	Salmon Racing	Buick
94	Sterling Marlin	Hagan Racing	Oldsmobile

== Qualifying ==
Qualifying was split into two rounds. The first round was originally scheduled to be held on Thursday, May 4, at 2:00 PM EST. However, after only nine drivers had made first-round attempts, rain would postpone the first round until the following day on Friday, May 5. Each driver would have one lap to set a time. During the first round, the top 20 drivers in the round would be guaranteed a starting spot in the race. If a driver was not able to guarantee a spot in the first round, they had the option to scrub their time from the first round and try and run a faster lap time in a second round qualifying run, held on Friday, May 5, at 2:00 PM EST. As with the first round, each driver would have one lap to set a time. For this specific race, positions 21-40 would be decided on time, and depending on who needed it, a select amount of positions were given to cars who had not otherwise qualified but were high enough in owner's points; up to two were given.

Mark Martin, driving for Roush Racing, would win the pole, setting a time of 49.601 and an average speed of 193.061 miles per hour (310.702 km/h) in the first round.

Five drivers would fail to qualify.

=== Full qualifying results ===
Pos.	#	Driver	Team	Make	Time	Speed
1	6	Mark Martin	Roush Racing	Ford	49.601	193.061
2	28	Davey Allison	Robert Yates Racing	Ford	49.655	192.851
3	21	Neil Bonnett	Wood Brothers Racing	Ford	49.826	192.189
4	9	Bill Elliott	Melling Racing	Ford	50.144	190.970
5	17	Darrell Waltrip	Hendrick Motorsports	Chevrolet	50.411	189.959
6	75	Morgan Shepherd	RahMoc Enterprises	Pontiac	50.428	189.895
7	33	Harry Gant	Jackson Bros. Motorsports	Oldsmobile	50.453	189.800
8	55	Phil Parsons	Jackson Bros. Motorsports	Oldsmobile	50.532	189.504
9	11	Terry Labonte	Junior Johnson & Associates	Ford	50.617	189.185
10	4	Rick Wilson	Morgan–McClure Motorsports	Oldsmobile	50.628	189.144
11	14	A. J. Foyt	A. J. Foyt Racing	Oldsmobile	50.694	188.898
12	5	Geoff Bodine	Hendrick Motorsports	Chevrolet	50.696	188.891
13	84	Dick Trickle (R)	Stavola Brothers Racing	Buick	50.783	188.567
14	42	Kyle Petty	SABCO Racing	Pontiac	50.835	188.374
15	43	Richard Petty	Petty Enterprises	Pontiac	50.866	188.259
16	94	Sterling Marlin	Hagan Racing	Oldsmobile	50.937	187.997
17	3	Dale Earnhardt	Richard Childress Racing	Chevrolet	51.099	187.401
18	83	Lake Speed	Speed Racing	Oldsmobile	51.123	187.313
19	73	Phil Barkdoll	Barkdoll Racing	Oldsmobile	51.355	186.467
20	16	Larry Pearson (R)	Pearson Racing	Buick	51.481	186.010
Failed to lock in Round 1
21	25	Ken Schrader	Hendrick Motorsports	Chevrolet	50.525	189.530
22	15	Brett Bodine	Bud Moore Engineering	Ford	51.498	185.949
23	40	Ben Hess (R)	Hess Racing	Oldsmobile	51.544	185.783
24	52	Jimmy Means	Jimmy Means Racing	Pontiac	51.553	185.751
25	30	Michael Waltrip	Bahari Racing	Pontiac	51.563	185.715
26	27	Rusty Wallace	Blue Max Racing	Pontiac	51.695	185.240
27	88	Greg Sacks	Baker–Schiff Racing	Pontiac	51.733	185.104
28	29	Dale Jarrett	Cale Yarborough Motorsports	Pontiac	51.764	184.993
29	7	Alan Kulwicki	AK Racing	Ford	51.820	184.794
30	90	Chad Little (R)	Donlavey Racing	Ford	51.864	184.637
31	10	Derrike Cope	Whitcomb Racing	Pontiac	51.927	184.413
32	26	Ricky Rudd	King Racing	Buick	51.929	184.406
33	8	Bobby Hillin Jr.	Stavola Brothers Racing	Buick	52.015	184.101
34	2	Ernie Irvan	U.S. Racing	Pontiac	52.034	184.034
35	23	Eddie Bierschwale	B&B Racing	Oldsmobile	52.101	183.797
36	31	Jim Sauter	Bob Clark Motorsports	Pontiac	52.428	182.650
37	71	Dave Marcis	Marcis Auto Racing	Chevrolet	52.499	182.403
38	18	Ron Esau	TriStar Motorsports	Pontiac	52.527	182.306
39	22	Grant Adcox	Adcox Racing	Chevrolet	52.764	181.487
40	93	Charlie Baker	Salmon Racing	Buick	52.802	181.357
Provisional
41	57	Hut Stricklin (R)	Osterlund Racing	Pontiac	53.207	179.976
Failed to qualify
42	70	J. D. McDuffie	McDuffie Racing	Pontiac	-*	-*
43	80	Jimmy Horton	S&H Racing	Pontiac	-*	-*
44	0	Delma Cowart	H. L. Waters Racing	Ford	-*	-*
45	86	Walter Surma	Surma Racing	Chevrolet	-*	-*
46	49	Tony Spanos	Hylton Motorsports	Buick	-*	-*
Official first round qualifying results
Official starting lineup

== Race results ==
Fin	St	#	Driver	Team	Make	Laps	Led	Status	Pts	Winnings
1	2	28	Davey Allison	Robert Yates Racing	Ford	188	94	running	185	$98,675
2	9	11	Terry Labonte	Junior Johnson & Associates	Ford	188	4	running	175	$51,275
3	1	6	Mark Martin	Roush Racing	Ford	188	1	running	170	$39,850
4	6	75	Morgan Shepherd	RahMoc Enterprises	Pontiac	188	32	running	165	$34,250
5	5	17	Darrell Waltrip	Hendrick Motorsports	Chevrolet	188	3	running	160	$28,900
6	21	25	Ken Schrader	Hendrick Motorsports	Chevrolet	188	35	running	155	$24,625
7	7	33	Harry Gant	Jackson Bros. Motorsports	Oldsmobile	188	0	running	146	$17,800
8	17	3	Dale Earnhardt	Richard Childress Racing	Chevrolet	188	2	running	147	$20,450
9	3	21	Neil Bonnett	Wood Brothers Racing	Ford	188	6	running	143	$15,475
10	26	27	Rusty Wallace	Blue Max Racing	Pontiac	188	11	running	139	$21,225
11	4	9	Bill Elliott	Melling Racing	Ford	188	0	running	130	$19,147
12	12	5	Geoff Bodine	Hendrick Motorsports	Chevrolet	188	0	running	127	$14,615
13	29	7	Alan Kulwicki	AK Racing	Ford	188	0	running	124	$11,785
14	16	94	Sterling Marlin	Hagan Racing	Oldsmobile	188	0	running	121	$10,980
15	10	4	Rick Wilson	Morgan–McClure Motorsports	Oldsmobile	188	0	running	118	$11,175
16	11	14	A. J. Foyt	A. J. Foyt Racing	Oldsmobile	188	0	running	115	$6,185
17	8	55	Phil Parsons	Jackson Bros. Motorsports	Oldsmobile	188	0	running	112	$9,445
18	18	83	Lake Speed	Speed Racing	Oldsmobile	188	0	running	109	$9,130
19	22	15	Brett Bodine	Bud Moore Engineering	Ford	188	0	running	106	$8,815
20	37	71	Dave Marcis	Marcis Auto Racing	Chevrolet	187	0	running	103	$11,807
21	25	30	Michael Waltrip	Bahari Racing	Pontiac	186	0	running	100	$7,865
22	23	40	Ben Hess (R)	Hess Racing	Oldsmobile	186	0	running	97	$6,320
23	15	43	Richard Petty	Petty Enterprises	Pontiac	186	0	running	94	$5,360
24	39	22	Grant Adcox	Adcox Racing	Chevrolet	183	0	running	91	$4,255
25	34	2	Ernie Irvan	U.S. Racing	Pontiac	181	0	running	88	$5,275
26	40	93	Charlie Baker	Salmon Racing	Buick	179	0	running	85	$4,095
27	13	84	Dick Trickle (R)	Stavola Brothers Racing	Buick	177	0	crash	82	$7,640
28	14	42	Kyle Petty	SABCO Racing	Pontiac	170	0	crash	79	$3,985
29	20	16	Larry Pearson (R)	Pearson Racing	Buick	169	0	crash	76	$6,930
30	31	10	Derrike Cope	Whitcomb Racing	Pontiac	169	0	crash	73	$3,925
31	32	26	Ricky Rudd	King Racing	Buick	169	0	crash	70	$6,445
32	19	73	Phil Barkdoll	Barkdoll Racing	Oldsmobile	169	0	engine	67	$3,690
33	41	57	Hut Stricklin (R)	Osterlund Racing	Pontiac	168	0	crash	64	$3,660
34	30	90	Chad Little (R)	Donlavey Racing	Ford	168	0	crash	61	$3,630
35	33	8	Bobby Hillin Jr.	Stavola Brothers Racing	Buick	165	0	running	58	$6,275
36	36	31	Jim Sauter	Bob Clark Motorsports	Pontiac	164	0	crash	55	$4,220
37	27	88	Greg Sacks	Baker–Schiff Racing	Pontiac	147	0	crash	52	$6,140
38	38	18	Ron Esau	TriStar Motorsports	Pontiac	117	0	crash	0	$3,460
39	35	23	Eddie Bierschwale	B&B Racing	Oldsmobile	52	0	engine	46	$4,005
40	28	29	Dale Jarrett	Cale Yarborough Motorsports	Pontiac	37	0	crash	43	$5,375
41	24	52	Jimmy Means	Jimmy Means Racing	Pontiac	5	0	engine	40	$3,375
Failed to qualify
42		70	J. D. McDuffie	McDuffie Racing	Pontiac					
43		80	Jimmy Horton	S&H Racing	Pontiac					
44		0	Delma Cowart	H. L. Waters Racing	Ford					
45		86	Walter Surma	Surma Racing	Chevrolet					
46		49	Tony Spanos	Hylton Motorsports	Buick					
Official race results

== Standings after the race ==
Drivers' Championship standings

	Pos	Driver	Points
	1	Dale Earnhardt	1,376
2	2	Darrell Waltrip	1,299 (-77)
1	3	Geoff Bodine	1,298 (-78)
1	4	Alan Kulwicki	1,271 (–105)
	5	Rusty Wallace	1,238 (–138)
2	6	Davey Allison	1,222 (–154)
	7	Mark Martin	1,213 (–163)
2	8	Sterling Marlin	1,199 (–177)
1	9	Rick Wilson	1,107 (–269)
2	10	Harry Gant	1,090 (–286)
Official driver's standings

- Note: Only the first 10 positions are included for the driver standings.

Previous race: 1989 Pannill Sweatshirts 500	NASCAR Winston Cup Series; 1989 season	Next race: 1989 Coca-Cola 600
