= Wahoo! (company) =

Former American boatmaker

- Founded: 1985
- Founder: Ray Curry
- Defunct: 1996
- Headquarters: United States
- Products: Fiberglass recreational boats

Wahoo! (sometimes stylized as WAHOO!) was a United States–based corporation which built fiberglass recreational boats from 1985 to 1996. Wahoo! boats were built in Hanover Industrial Park, near Ashland, Virginia.

== History ==
Wahoo! was founded in 1985 by Ray Curry, owner of Reliance Marine in Richmond, Virginia. While Reliance Marine had once been a Boston Whaler dealer, Curry founded Wahoo! to compete with Boston Whaler after having a falling out with them.

By 1996, Curry had decided to retire and sold Wahoo! to Brunswick Corporation, who seemed interested in the company's hull molds and European style transom designs. Brunswick integrated the hull designs into their Robalo brand. Marine Products Corporation acquired the Wahoo! trademark when it purchased Robalo from Brunswick in June 2001.

== Features ==
Wahoo! boats were designed to be self-bailing and included features like a built-in gas tank and a drainable hull considered innovative at that time for the types of boats they were building. Unlike similar boat designs, which had foam filled hulls, Wahoo! boats had hulls lined with foam, with a space between the hull liner foam and the cap foam. This design allowed the inner hull of the boats to be drained of moisture. While primarily made of fiberglass, wood was utilized in the transom and other locations for reinforcement.

== Marketing ==
Wahoo! claimed its boats were unsinkable. The company's brochures included a picture of a Wahoo! boat cut into three parts, each part afloat in water and with one or more people standing on it.
