= Steve Seligman =

American stock car racing driver

- Born: October 27, 1954 (age 72); Lake Forest, Illinois, U.S.

ARCA Menards Series career
- 3 races run over 3 years
- Best finish: 112th (1986, 1987)
- First race: 1986 96 Rock 300 (Atlanta)
- Last race: 1989 Daytona ARCA 200 (Daytona)

Steve Seligman (born October 27, 1954) is an American stock car racing driver. A native of Lake Forest, Illinois, Seligman raced in the ARCA, ARTGO and ASA series during the 1980s. Starting in 1989, Seligman moved to the NASCAR Winston Cup Series; he attempted to qualify for thirteen races between 1989 and 1996, but never successfully qualified for a race in NASCAR's top series. Seligman did compete in the 1996 Winston Open, the qualifying event for NASCAR's all-star race; he started 34th of 36 cars that qualified, and finished 27th.

In February 1997, a police raid found cocaine in significant quantities at Seligman's race shop. He was arrested and suspended by NASCAR; he was found guilty and sentenced to 27 years in prison. Since his release, he has returned to racing in the Midwest.

== Motorsports career results ==
=== NASCAR ===
(key) (Bold - Pole position awarded by qualifying time. Italics - Pole position earned by points standings or practice time. * – Most laps led.)

==== Winston Cup Series ====
NASCAR Winston Cup Series results
Year	Team	No.	Make	1	2	3	4	5	6	7	8	9	10	11	12	13	14	15	16	17	18	19	20	21	22	23	24	25	26	27	28	29	30	31	NWCC	Pts	Ref
1989	Seligman Racing	65	Ford	DAY	CAR	ATL	RCH; DNQ	DAR	BRI; DNQ	NWS	MAR; DNQ	TAL	CLT	DOV	SON	POC	MCH	DAY	POC	TAL	GLN	MCH	BRI	DAR	RCH	DOV	MAR	CLT	NWS	CAR	PHO	ATL			NA	-	
1995	O'Neil Racing	65	Ford	DAY; DNQ	CAR	RCH	ATL	DAR	BRI	NWS	MAR																								NA	-	
1995	O'Neil Racing	65	Chevy									TAL; DNQ	SON	CLT	DOV	POC	MCH	DAY; DNQ	NHA	POC	TAL; DNQ	IND; DNQ	GLN	MCH	BRI	DAR	RCH	DOV	MAR	NWS	CLT	CAR	PHO	ATL	NA	-	
1996	O'Neil Racing	65	Ford	DAY; DNQ	CAR	RCH; DNQ	ATL	DAR	BRI	NWS	MAR																								NA	-	
1996	O'Neil Racing	57	Ford									TAL; DNQ	SON																						NA	-	
1996	Seligman Racing	57	Ford											CLT; DNQ	DOV	POC	MCH	DAY; Wth^{†}	NHA	POC	TAL	IND; DNQ	GLN	MCH	BRI	DAR	RCH	DOV	MAR	NWS	CLT	CAR	PHO	ATL	NA	-	
^{†} - Withdrew after a blown engine in practice

===== Daytona 500 =====
Year	Team	Manufacturer	Start	Finish
1995	O'Neil Racing	Ford	DNQ	
1996	O'Neil Racing	Ford	DNQ	

=== ARCA Permatex SuperCar Series ===
(key) (Bold – Pole position awarded by qualifying time. Italics – Pole position earned by points standings or practice time. * – Most laps led.)

ARCA Permatex SuperCar Series results
Year	Team	No.	Make	1	2	3	4	5	6	7	8	9	10	11	12	13	14	15	16	17	APSC	Pts	Ref
1986		30	Chevy	ATL	DAY	ATL	TAL	SIR	SSP	FRS	KIL	CSP	TAL	BLN	ISF	DSF	TOL	MCS	ATL; 27		112th	-	
1987			Chevy	DAY	ATL; 11	TAL	DEL	ACS	TOL	ROC	POC	FRS	KIL	TAL	FRS	ISF	INF	DSF	SLM	ATL	112th	-	
1989	Seligman Racing	94	Ford	DAY; 30	ATL	KIL	TAL	FRS	POC	KIL	HAG	POC	TAL	DEL	FRS	ISF	TOL	DSF	SLM	ATL	125th	-	

=== ASA STARS National Tour ===
(key) (Bold – Pole position awarded by qualifying time. Italics – Pole position earned by points standings or practice time. * – Most laps led. ** – All laps led.)

ASA STARS National Tour results
Year	Team	No.	Make	1	2	3	4	5	6	7	8	9	10	ASNTC	Pts	Ref
2023	Steven Seligman	65	Ford	FIF	MAD	NWS	HCY	MLW; 20	AND	WIR	TOL	WIN	NSV	86th	32	
