= Country Time =

Lemon-flavored drink mix

- Product type: Drink mix
- Current owner: Kraft Heinz
- Produced by: Kraft Foods
- Country: U.S.
- Introduced: 1975; 51 years ago
- Website: countrytime.com

Country Time is a brand of non-carbonated lemon-flavored drink mix and soft drink. The powdered mix is produced by Kraft Foods.

== History ==
Country Time lemonade flavor drink mix was introduced in 1975 by General Foods. Over the years various other flavors, including pink, raspberry, and strawberry lemonade, were added. In 1981 A&W acquired a license to make the bottled and canned ready to drink product from then-owner General Foods. In 1989, General Foods merged with Kraft Foods, putting the brand under the ownership of Kraft, which still owns it to this day.

Country Time has sponsored NASCAR cars since 1989 when Michael Waltrip drove the car, posting a top 5 finish in it. Possibly the most notable driver was Neil Bonnett driving the Country Time sponsored car for the 1994 Daytona 500, the same race he died in a crash practicing for.

Country Time Lite Lemonade and Lite Pink Lemonade were introduced in 2007 with half the sugar of regular Country Time (advertised as 35 calories per serving).

In April 2012, Sodastream added several Country Time flavors to its line of Sodamix syrups for the company's line of home soda makers.

== See also ==
- List of lemonade topics
