= GM Certified Service =

Auto repair service for General Motors

- Product type: Auto repair service
- Current owner: General Motors
- Country: U.S.
- Introduced: 1977; 49 years ago
- Markets: U.S.
- Website: mycertifiedservice.com

GM Certified Service, formerly GM Goodwrench, is an auto repair service for General Motors. In 2011, GM replaced the Goodwrench brand in the US with Cadillac, Buick, Chevrolet, and GMC Certified Service brands (Canada followed in 2014).

== Background ==
Former logo of GM Certified Service, then GM Goodwrench

Goodwrench took to the airwaves in 1977 as a way to market General Motors franchised dealers' service departments, replacing a patchwork of separate GM-divisional offerings. At the time, GM marketed vehicles in the US under the Chevrolet, Pontiac, Oldsmobile, Buick, Cadillac, and GMC brands. Television commercials in the United States used actor Barry Coe as a spokesman. Jerome H. Peleaux was the creator and tester of the program for GM.

The Mr. Goodwrench program, as originally conceived, required each dealer to adhere to a set of service delivery standards: requiring high levels of factory training, parts on hand, and service department amenities. The program was backed with a national advertising campaign which featured the iconic Mr. Goodwrench, as the helpful mechanic who could fix whatever ailed your vehicle.

Through several iterations, the advertising campaign worked its way into the lexicon of Americana by becoming shorthand for someone who can fix things. For many years, Jay Leno included his portrayal of Mr. Badwrench, the Evil Twin of Mr. Goodwrench in his stand-up act; The NASA Space shuttle astronauts compared themselves to "Mr. Goodwrench" when they were fixing the Hubble Space Telescope. Beginning in 1995, the brand was changed to become GM Goodwrench Service. In 1997, the word "Plus" was added, and they dropped the word "Mr." and the human representations.

In February 2011, General Motors phased out the Goodwrench brand in the United States, as it sought to focus its marketing efforts on its four brands. The Goodwrench name was still used for service in Canada until March 2014 when GM Goodwrench was re-branded as GM Certified Service.

== Motorsports sponsorships ==
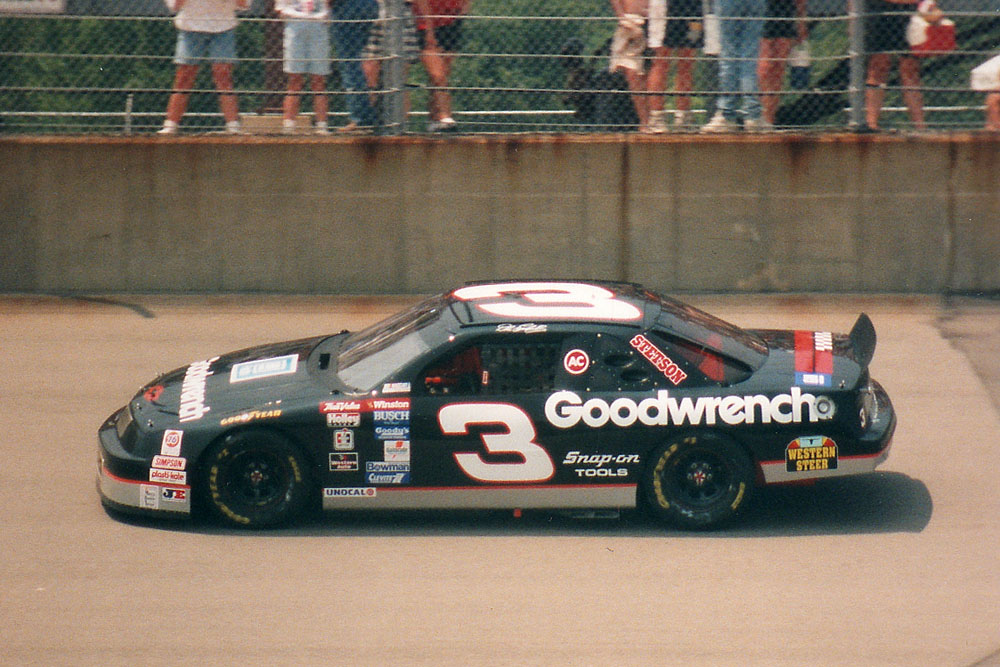
The #3 Goodwrench car driven by NASCAR Winston Cup driver Dale Earnhardt in 1994

From 1988 until 2005, GM Goodwrench Service Plus was the primary sponsor for Richard Childress Racing (RCR) in NASCAR. In 2006, they reduced their role, as the No. 29 car split sponsorship with Hershey's. On October 7, 2006, General Motors announced that it would step down as one of the longest-running NASCAR title sponsors.

With this change, GM's Service and Parts Operations closed a major chapter in NASCAR history. Since signing on with the Rookie of the Year driver, Dale Earnhardt, as an associate sponsor in the early 1980s, and assuming title sponsor status for the 1988 season, Goodwrench was present in the winners circle for six of Earnhardt's seven Winston Cup Series championships.

Following Earnhardt's death on the last lap of the 2001 Daytona 500, RCR and Goodwrench moved the sponsorship from the trademark "3" car to No. 29, with Kevin Harvick as the driver.

Goodwrench remained an associate sponsor for the 2007 season. In 2008, after a 22-year partnership, GM Goodwrench ended its sponsorship with NASCAR and Richard Childress Racing, as a result of budget cuts from General Motors.

GM Goodwrench and GM Performance Parts were long-running sponsors of Warren Johnson in NHRA Pro Stock competition.

== See also ==
- GM Components Holdings
