= Rod Osterlund =

Former NASCAR team owner

Rodney W. Osterlund (born November 19, 1934) is an American former racing team owner and businessman. He was a NASCAR Winston Cup Series car owner from 1977 to 1981, and then again from 1989 to 1991. Osterlund's first race as a car owner was at the 1977 Cam 2 Motor Oil 400 while his final race as a car owner was at the 1991 Daytona 500. He won the 1980 NASCAR Winston Cup Series as an owner with driver Dale Earnhardt.

In 2010, Osterlund was inducted into the West Coast Stock Car Hall of Fame.

== Team history ==
Osterlund started his first team in 1977. In 1979, he hired rookie Dale Earnhardt, who went on to win Rookie of the Year, and then the championship in 1980. Osterlund sold this team to Jim Stacy in the middle of the 1981 season. Earnhardt drove four races for Stacy before he left for Richard Childress Racing.

== Drivers ==
Osterlund fielded cars four drivers from which Earnhardt won Osterlund his only Winston Cup Championship in 1980. Other notable drivers include Neil Bonnett in 1977, Dave Marcis in 1978, David Pearson subbing in for an injured Dale Earnhardt in 1979, Hut Stricklin in 1989, and Jimmy Spencer in 1990. As of 2009, he lives in California.

== Statistics ==
Osterlund as a car owner had 201 starts, seven wins, 59 top-five finishes, 91 top-ten finishes, five poles, and the 1980 Winston Cup points championship.
