= Ben Hess =

American racing driver (born 1964)

- Born: December 20, 1964 (age 61); Wadsworth, Ohio, U.S.

NASCAR Cup Series career
- 12 races run over 7 years
- Best finish: 37th (1989)
- First race: 1988 AC Delco 500 (Rockingham)
- Last race: 1995 Daytona 500 (Daytona)
| Wins | Top tens | Poles |
|---|---|---|
| 0 | 0 | 0 |

NASCAR O'Reilly Auto Parts Series career
- 9 races run over 4 years
- Best finish: 58th (1990)
- First race: 1982 Mountain Dew 300 (Hickory)
- Last race: 1990 Pontiac 200 (Darlington)
| Wins | Top tens | Poles |
|---|---|---|
| 0 | 1 | 0 |

Ben Hess (born December 20, 1964) is an American stock car racing driver. Now retired, he was a regular on the Automobile Racing Club of America (ARCA) series in the early 1990s, and also competed in twelve NASCAR Winston Cup Series races between 1988 and 1995.

== Racing career ==
A native of Wadsworth, Ohio, Hess began racing in 1982; in 1983, he sold a service station that he owned to raise money for his racing career. He moved from competing primarily on dirt tracks to the ARCA series in 1986. He made his first start in the series in 1988; between 1988 and 1996, he competed in 63 races, winning four times. Hess won the ARCA 200-mile (320 km) event at Daytona International Speedway, the series' most prestigious race, in 1989 and 1991. In 2001, he made his 64th and final start in the series at Daytona International Speedway, finishing 37th after an accident.

Between 1988 and 1995 Hess made twelve starts in NASCAR's top series, then known as the Winston Cup Series; his first race was at North Carolina Motor Speedway in October 1988, where he finished 20th in a family-owned car; he would run for his family team in ten of the twelve Cup Series races he qualified for. He would also attempt races for owners Henley Gray, Jim Spicuzza, Tom Winkle, and Sadler Brothers Racing, qualifying in a single race for Winkle in 1990. While racing for the Sadler Brothers, Hess was among 86 drivers who attempted to qualify for the 1994 Brickyard 400; after failing to make the top-twenty in first-round qualifying, he was injured in a practice crash while preparing for the second round of time trials and was forced to withdraw from the event. Hess made his final start in the Winston Cup Series at the 1995 Daytona 500, racing for RaDiUs Motorsports; Hess finished 28th in the race, four laps down.

Hess also ran in nine NASCAR Busch Series Grand National Division races between 1982 and 1990, posting a best finish of ninth in his first start during the series' inaugural season of 1982 at Hickory Motor Speedway. In 1988, he won a qualifying race in the series at Charlotte Motor Speedway.

== Motorsports career results ==
=== NASCAR ===
(key) (Bold – Pole position awarded by qualifying time. Italics – Pole position earned by points standings or practice time. * – Most laps led.)

==== Winston Cup Series ====
NASCAR Winston Cup Series results
| Year | Team | No. | Make | 1 | 2 | 3 | 4 | 5 | 6 | 7 | 8 | 9 | 10 | 11 | 12 | 13 | 14 | 15 | 16 | 17 | 18 | 19 | 20 | 21 | 22 | 23 | 24 | 25 | 26 | 27 | 28 | 29 | 30 | 31 | NWCC | Pts | Ref |
|---|---|---|---|---|---|---|---|---|---|---|---|---|---|---|---|---|---|---|---|---|---|---|---|---|---|---|---|---|---|---|---|---|---|---|---|---|---|
| 1988 | Hess Racing | 40 | Olds | DAY | RCH | CAR | ATL | DAR | BRI | NWS | MAR | TAL | CLT | DOV | RSD | POC | MCH | DAY | POC; DNQ | TAL | GLN | MCH; DNQ | BRI | DAR | RCH; DNQ | DOV; DNQ | MAR | CLT; DNQ | NWS | CAR; 20 | PHO | ATL | | | 67th | 103 | |
| 1989 | Hess Racing | 40 | Olds | DAY; 22 | CAR; 22 | ATL; 17 | RCH; 24 | DAR; 23 | BRI; DNQ | NWS; 15 | MAR; 17 | TAL; 22 | CLT; 20 | DOV | SON | POC | MCH | DAY | POC | TAL | GLN | MCH | BRI | DAR | RCH | DOV | MAR | CLT | NWS | CAR | PHO | ATL | | | 37th | 921 | |
| 1990 | Winkle Motorsports | 48 | Pontiac | DAY | RCH | CAR | ATL | DAR | BRI | NWS | MAR | TAL | CLT | DOV | SON | POC | MCH | DAY | POC | TAL | GLN | MCH; 31 | BRI | DAR | RCH | DOV | MAR | NWS | CLT | CAR | PHO | ATL | | | 88th | 70 | |
| 1992 | Gray Racing | 62 | Ford | DAY; DNQ | CAR | RCH | ATL | DAR | BRI | NWS | MAR | TAL | CLT | DOV | SON | POC | MCH | DAY | POC | TAL | GLN | MCH | BRI | DAR | RCH | DOV | MAR | NWS | CLT | CAR | PHO | ATL | | | NA | - | |
| 1993 | Gray Racing | 62 | Ford | DAY | CAR | RCH | ATL | DAR | BRI | NWS | MAR | TAL; DNQ | SON | CLT | DOV | POC | MCH | DAY | NHA | POC | TAL | GLN | MCH | BRI | DAR | RCH | DOV | MAR | NWS | CLT | CAR | PHO | ATL | | NA | - | |
| 1994 | Sadler Brothers Racing | 95 | Ford | DAY | CAR | RCH | ATL | DAR | BRI | NWS | MAR | TAL | SON | CLT | DOV | POC | MCH | DAY | NHA | POC | TAL; DNQ | IND; DNQ | GLN | MCH | BRI | DAR | RCH | DOV | MAR | NWS | CLT; DNQ | CAR | PHO | ATL | NA | - | |
| 1995 | RaDiUs Motorsports | 66 | Ford | DAY; 28 | CAR; DNQ | RCH; DNQ | ATL; DNQ | DAR | BRI | NWS | MAR | TAL | SON | CLT | DOV | POC | MCH | DAY | NHA | POC | TAL | IND | GLN | MCH | BRI | DAR | RCH | DOV | MAR | NWS | CLT | CAR | PHO | ATL | 59th | 79 | |

===== Daytona 500 =====
| Year | Team | Manufacturer | Start | Finish |
|---|---|---|---|---|
| 1989 | Hess Racing | Oldsmobile | 32 | 22 |
| 1992 | Gray Racing | Ford | DNQ | |
| 1995 | RaDiUs Motorsports | Ford | 26 | 28 |

==== Busch Series ====
NASCAR Busch Series results
| Year | Team | No. | Make | 1 | 2 | 3 | 4 | 5 | 6 | 7 | 8 | 9 | 10 | 11 | 12 | 13 | 14 | 15 | 16 | 17 | 18 | 19 | 20 | 21 | 22 | 23 | 24 | 25 | 26 | 27 | 28 | 29 | 30 | 31 | NBSC | Pts | Ref |
|---|---|---|---|---|---|---|---|---|---|---|---|---|---|---|---|---|---|---|---|---|---|---|---|---|---|---|---|---|---|---|---|---|---|---|---|---|---|
| 1982 | | | | DAY | RCH | BRI | MAR | DAR | HCY | SBO | CRW | RCH | LGY | DOV | HCY; 9 | CLT | ASH | HCY | SBO | CAR | CRW | SBO | HCY | LGY | IRP | BRI | HCY | RCH | MAR | CLT | HCY | MAR | | | 112th | 138 | |
| 1988 | Hess Racing | 4 | Olds | DAY | HCY | CAR | MAR | DAR | BRI | LNG | NZH | SBO | NSV | CLT | DOV | ROU | LAN | LVL | MYB | OXF | SBO | HCY | LNG | IRP | ROU | BRI | DAR; 22 | RCH | DOV | MAR | | | | | 59th | 270 | |
| 1988 | Hess Racing | 4 | Pontiac | | | | | | | | | | | | | | | | | | | | | | | | | | | | CLT; 20 | | | | 59th | 270 | |
| 1988 | Hess Racing | 04 | Olds | | | | | | | | | | | | | | | | | | | | | | | | | | | | | CAR; 22 | MAR | | 59th | 270 | |
| 1989 | Hess Racing | 40 | Olds | DAY; 22 | CAR | MAR | HCY | DAR | BRI | NZH | SBO | LAN | NSV | CLT | DOV | ROU | LVL | VOL | MYB | SBO | HCY | DUB | IRP | ROU | BRI | DAR | RCH | DOV | MAR | CLT | CAR | MAR | | | 83rd | 97 | |
| 1990 | Falcon Racing | 9 | Chevy | DAY; DNQ | RCH | CAR; 33 | MAR; 21 | HCY; 25 | DAR; 22 | BRI | LAN | SBO | NZH | HCY | CLT | DOV | ROU | VOL | MYB | OXF | NHA | SBO | DUB | IRP | ROU | BRI | DAR | RCH | DOV | MAR | CLT | NHA | CAR | MAR | 58th | 349 | |
