= Crown Central Petroleum =

American oil company

Crown Central Petroleum/Crown Central LLC

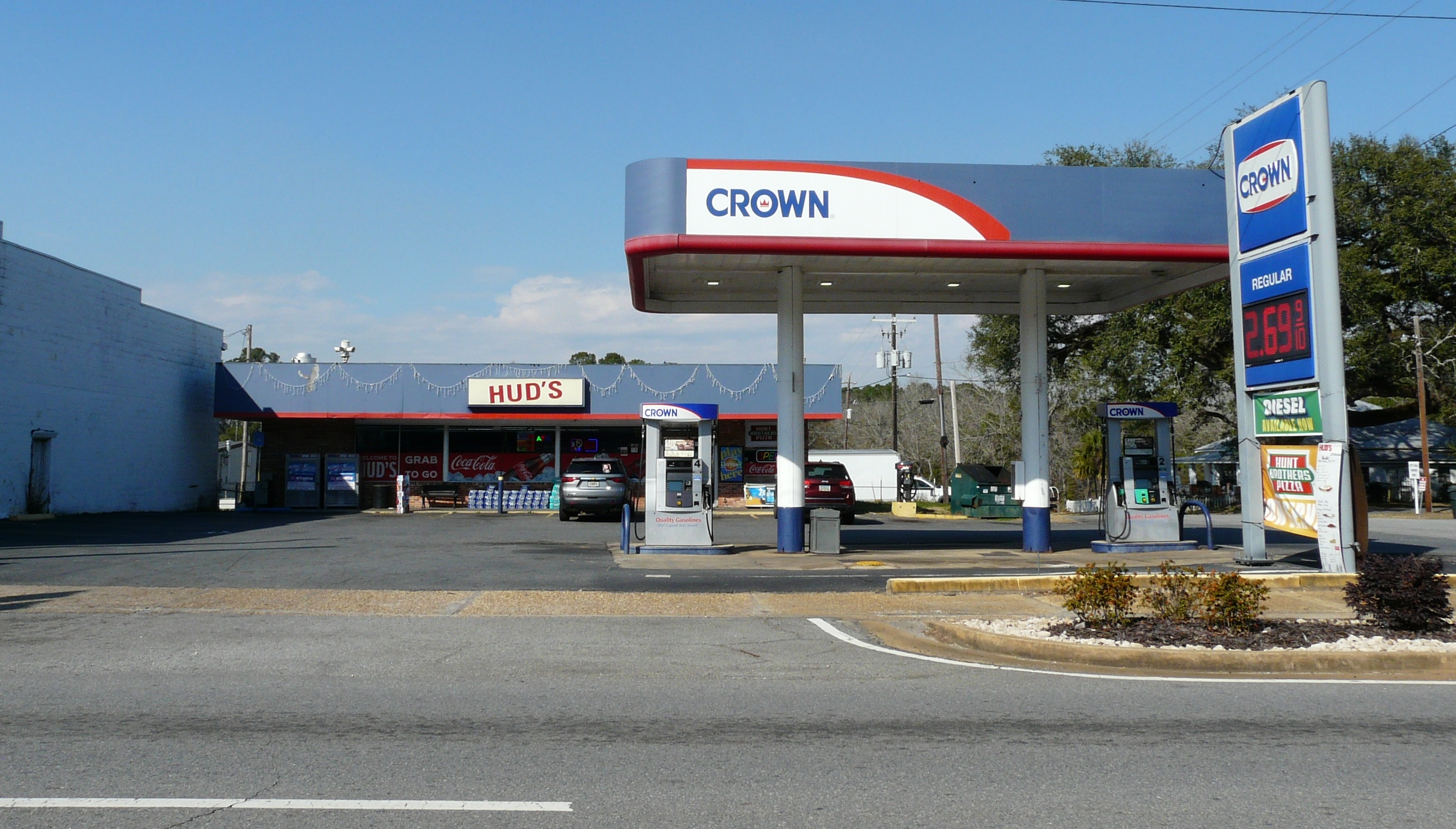
- Crown gas station in Whigham, Georgia
- Type: private
- Industry: Oil and Gasoline
- Founded: 1925 Harris County, Texas
- Headquarters: Baltimore, Maryland
- Products: Petrochemical
- Revenue: Unknown
- Number of employees: Unknown
- Website: www.crowncentral.com

Crown Central Petroleum, commonly known as Crown, is an American oil company that has flourished in Baltimore since the early 20th century until its recent decline due to rebranding.

== History ==
Crown Central Petroleum Company or Crown, first began in 1917 in Harris County, Texas, when the New Crown Oil and Refining Company's Number 3 well struck oil.

In 2013 Clark Brands acquired the brand licensing business of Crown Central Petroleum.

An abandoned Crown gas station was used in the production of House Of Cards, a Netflix original series. The building, in Churchville, Maryland, is currently still standing.

== Endangerment ==
During the summer of 2006, many stations began to disappear. All but about 20 stations were rebranded to either Texaco, Chevron Corporation, or Royal Dutch Shell gas stations. This is because the company sold these stations about two years before, as reported in The Baltimore Sun.

As of the Spring of 2022 20 Crown stations operate in the state of Maryland. There are four Crown branded stations operating in Baltimore, Maryland. All four stations utilized a standard self service canopy set up featuring a brick and tan stucco design. All four stations currently operate 24 hours a day. The stations can be found at 4201 Erdman Ave , 5101 York Rd, 501 E 33rd St and 4123 Frederick Ave

In 2010 Crown Central LLC formed an alliance with Clark Brands LLC and Crown Clark to outsource key payments processes to Clark. In October of 2010 the two companies merged to form Clark Crown Brands to further expand Crown licensing. As of 2025, Clark Crown Brands, LLC is a wholly owned subsidiary of Clark Brands, LLC that licenses the Crown brand to petroleum marketers.

The goal of the merger was to offer brand licensing to marketers who want to offer a low-cost alternative brand to entrepreneurial dealers. The licensees manage their own petroleum supply, purchasing petrolium at their lowest available cost each day. Clark and Crown branded programs—combined with unbranded fuel—allow dealers to optimize the petroleum procurement while still being able to a sell a name brand product in the retail market.
