= Bull's-Eye Barbecue Sauce =

Barbecue sauce by Kraft

Bull's-Eye

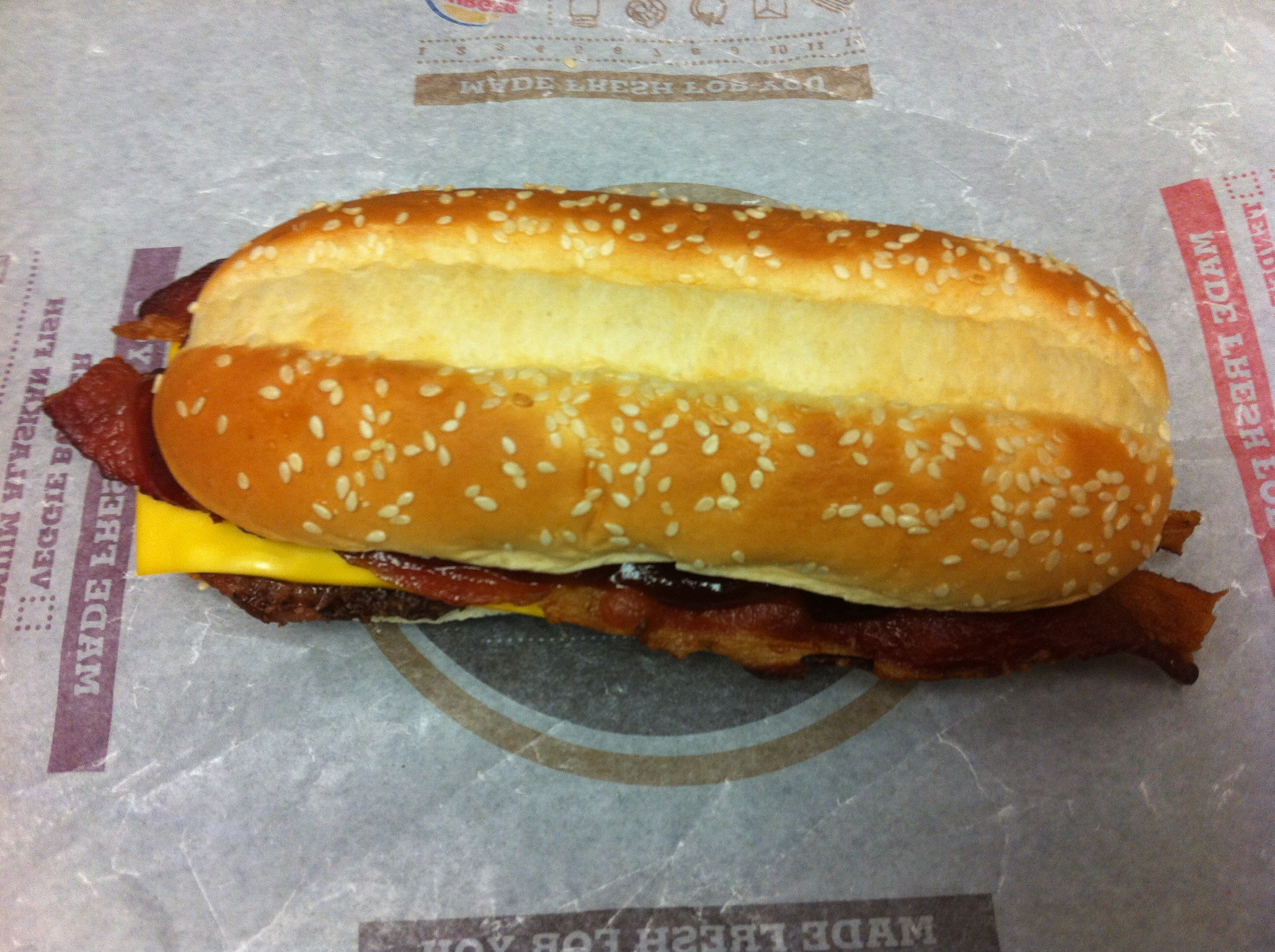
- Burger King Bull's-Eye BBQ Burger
- Product type: Barbecue sauce
- Current owner: Kraft Heinz
- Produced by: Kraft Foods
- Country: United States; Canada; Germany
- Introduced: 1985; 41 years ago
- Website: bullseyebbq.com

Bull's-Eye Barbecue Sauce is a barbecue sauce created and distributed by Kraft Heinz in the United States and Canada.

== History ==
Bulls-Eye was introduced in 1985 with the tag line The Big, Bold Taste of Bulls-Eye can't be beat. In 2009, Bull's-Eye launched a marketing campaign entitled the Bull's-Eye Brotherhood with a comedic series of web videos featuring Canadian comedian Gerry Dee. In 2012, the Original Kraft Foods Company Split into 2 Companies, Kraft Foods Group Retained the Bull's Eye Brand but Mondelez International retained the Rights to sell the Bull's-Eye Brand in Germany. It wasnt until 2017 where Mondelez's License to sell the Bull's-eye Brand in germany Expired, and the rights to sell it went back to Kraft Heinz(The current owner of the Bull's-Eye BBQ brand in North America as a result of Kraft Foods Group Merging with Heinz), and now the Bull's-eye BBQ brand in Germany is now owned by the Same owner that owns the Original Bull's-Eye BBQ brand.

== Burger King ==
Bulls-Eye was used at Burger King fast food restaurants on their Bulls-Eye BBQ burger, and Rodeo Cheeseburger. It was replaced in 2007 with Sweet Baby Ray's brand sauce.
