= 1989 AC Delco 500 =

27th race of the 1989 NASCAR Winston Cup Series

Race details
- Race 27 of 29 in the 1989 NASCAR Winston Cup Series
- The 1989 AC Delco 500 program cover.
- Date: October 22, 1989
- Official name: 25th Annual AC Delco 500
- Location: Rockingham, North Carolina, North Carolina Motor Speedway
- Course: Permanent racing facility
- Course length: 1.017 miles (1.636 km)
- Distance: 492 laps, 500.364 mi (805.257 km)
- Scheduled distance: 492 laps, 500.364 mi (805.257 km)
- Average speed: 114.079 miles per hour (183.592 km/h)
- Attendance: 52,500

Pole position
| Driver | Alan Kulwicki | AK Racing |
- Time: 24.634

Most laps led
| Driver | Rusty Wallace | Blue Max Racing |
- Laps: 194

Winner
| No. 6 | Mark Martin | Roush Racing |

Television in the United States
- Network: ESPN
- Announcers: Bob Jenkins, Ned Jarrett, Benny Parsons

Radio in the United States
- Radio: Motor Racing Network

The 1989 AC Delco 500 was the 27th stock car race of the 1989 NASCAR Winston Cup Series season and the 25th iteration of the event. The race was held on Sunday, October 22, 1989, before an audience of 52,500 in Rockingham, North Carolina, at North Carolina Speedway, a 1.017 miles (1.637 km) permanent high-banked racetrack. At race's end, Roush Racing driver Mark Martin would manage to dominate the late stages of the race, leading the final 77 laps to take his first career NASCAR Winston Cup Series victory and his only victory of the season. To fill out the top three, Blue Max Racing driver Rusty Wallace and Hendrick Motorsports driver Darrell Waltrip would finish second and third, respectively.

== Background ==
The layout of North Carolina Motor Speedway, the venue where the race was held.

North Carolina Motor Speedway was opened as a flat, one-mile oval on October 31, 1965. In 1969, the track was extensively reconfigured to a high-banked, D-shaped oval just over one mile in length. In 1997, North Carolina Motor Speedway merged with Penske Motorsports, and was renamed North Carolina Speedway. Shortly thereafter, the infield was reconfigured, and competition on the infield road course, mostly by the SCCA, was discontinued. Currently, the track is home to the Fast Track High Performance Driving School.

=== Entry list ===
- (R) denotes rookie driver.

| # | Driver | Team | Make | Sponsor |
|---|---|---|---|---|
| 2 | Ernie Irvan | U.S. Racing | Pontiac | Kroger |
| 3 | Dale Earnhardt | Richard Childress Racing | Chevrolet | GM Goodwrench Service Plus |
| 4 | Rick Wilson | Morgan–McClure Motorsports | Oldsmobile | Kodak |
| 5 | Geoff Bodine | Hendrick Motorsports | Chevrolet | Levi Garrett |
| 6 | Mark Martin | Roush Racing | Ford | Stroh's Light |
| 7 | Alan Kulwicki | AK Racing | Ford | Zerex |
| 8 | Bobby Hillin Jr. | Stavola Brothers Racing | Buick | Miller High Life |
| 9 | Bill Elliott | Melling Racing | Ford | Coors Light |
| 10 | Derrike Cope | Whitcomb Racing | Pontiac | Purolator |
| 11 | Terry Labonte | Junior Johnson & Associates | Ford | Budweiser |
| 15 | Brett Bodine | Bud Moore Engineering | Ford | Motorcraft |
| 16 | Larry Pearson (R) | Pearson Racing | Buick | Chattanooga Chew |
| 17 | Darrell Waltrip | Hendrick Motorsports | Chevrolet | Tide |
| 21 | Neil Bonnett | Wood Brothers Racing | Ford | Citgo |
| 25 | Ken Schrader | Hendrick Motorsports | Chevrolet | Folgers |
| 26 | Ricky Rudd | King Racing | Buick | Quaker State |
| 27 | Rusty Wallace | Blue Max Racing | Pontiac | Kodiak |
| 28 | Davey Allison | Robert Yates Racing | Ford | Texaco, Havoline |
| 29 | Dale Jarrett | Cale Yarborough Motorsports | Pontiac | Hardee's |
| 30 | Michael Waltrip | Bahari Racing | Pontiac | Country Time |
| 33 | Harry Gant | Jackson Bros. Motorsports | Oldsmobile | Skoal Bandit |
| 34 | Jim Bown | AAG Racing | Buick | AAG Racing |
| 42 | Kyle Petty | SABCO Racing | Pontiac | Peak Antifreeze |
| 43 | Richard Petty | Petty Enterprises | Pontiac | STP |
| 44 | Jim Sauter | Group 44 | Pontiac | Group 44 |
| 47 | Jack Pennington | Close Racing | Chevrolet | Chevrolet Dooley |
| 48 | Greg Sacks | Winkle Motorsports | Pontiac | Dinner Bell Foods |
| 52 | Jimmy Means | Jimmy Means Racing | Pontiac | Alka-Seltzer |
| 53 | Jerry O'Neil | Aroneck Racing | Oldsmobile | Aroneck Racing |
| 54 | Bob Schacht | Schacht Racing | Buick | Schacht Racing |
| 55 | Phil Parsons | Jackson Bros. Motorsports | Oldsmobile | Skoal, Crown Central Petroleum |
| 57 | Hut Stricklin (R) | Osterlund Racing | Pontiac | Heinz |
| 62 | Joe Ruttman | Douglas Smith Racing | Oldsmobile | Baja Boats |
| 71 | Dave Marcis | Marcis Auto Racing | Chevrolet | Lifebuoy |
| 75 | Morgan Shepherd | RahMoc Enterprises | Pontiac | Valvoline |
| 83 | Lake Speed | Speed Racing | Oldsmobile | Bull's-Eye Barbecue Sauce |
| 84 | Dick Trickle (R) | Stavola Brothers Racing | Buick | Miller High Life |
| 88 | Jimmy Spencer (R) | Baker–Schiff Racing | Pontiac | Crisco |
| 93 | Charlie Baker | Salmon Racing | Buick | Salmon Racing |
| 94 | Sterling Marlin | Hagan Racing | Oldsmobile | Sunoco |

== Qualifying ==
Qualifying was split into two rounds. The first round was held on Thursday, October 19, at 2:30 PM EST. Each driver would have one lap to set a time. During the first round, the top 20 drivers in the round would be guaranteed a starting spot in the race. If a driver was not able to guarantee a spot in the first round, they had the option to scrub their time from the first round and try and run a faster lap time in a second round qualifying run, held on Friday, October 20, at 2:00 PM EST. As with the first round, each driver would have one lap to set a time. For this specific race, positions 21-40 would be decided on time, and depending on who needed it, a select amount of positions were given to cars who had not otherwise qualified but were high enough in owner's points; up to two were given.

Alan Kulwicki, driving for his own AK Racing team, would win the pole, setting a time of 24.634 and an average speed of 148.624 miles per hour (239.187 km/h) in the first round.

No drivers would fail to qualify.

=== Full qualifying results ===
| Pos. | # | Driver | Team | Make | Time | Speed |
|---|---|---|---|---|---|---|
| 1 | 7 | Alan Kulwicki | AK Racing | Ford | 24.634 | 148.624 |
| 2 | 17 | Darrell Waltrip | Hendrick Motorsports | Chevrolet | 24.695 | 148.257 |
| 3 | 16 | Larry Pearson (R) | Pearson Racing | Buick | 24.738 | 147.999 |
| 4 | 9 | Bill Elliott | Melling Racing | Ford | 24.817 | 147.528 |
| 5 | 3 | Dale Earnhardt | Richard Childress Racing | Chevrolet | 24.826 | 147.474 |
| 6 | 10 | Derrike Cope | Whitcomb Racing | Pontiac | 24.836 | 147.415 |
| 7 | 6 | Mark Martin | Roush Racing | Ford | 24.838 | 147.403 |
| 8 | 26 | Ricky Rudd | King Racing | Buick | 24.870 | 147.214 |
| 9 | 25 | Ken Schrader | Hendrick Motorsports | Chevrolet | 24.880 | 147.154 |
| 10 | 94 | Sterling Marlin | Hagan Racing | Oldsmobile | 24.958 | 146.694 |
| 11 | 5 | Geoff Bodine | Hendrick Motorsports | Chevrolet | 24.968 | 146.636 |
| 12 | 33 | Harry Gant | Jackson Bros. Motorsports | Oldsmobile | 24.975 | 146.595 |
| 13 | 28 | Davey Allison | Robert Yates Racing | Ford | 24.998 | 146.460 |
| 14 | 15 | Brett Bodine | Bud Moore Engineering | Ford | 25.021 | 146.325 |
| 15 | 11 | Terry Labonte | Junior Johnson & Associates | Ford | 25.035 | 146.243 |
| 16 | 84 | Dick Trickle (R) | Stavola Brothers Racing | Buick | 25.044 | 146.191 |
| 17 | 47 | Jack Pennington | Close Racing | Chevrolet | 25.048 | 146.167 |
| 18 | 57 | Hut Stricklin (R) | Osterlund Racing | Pontiac | 25.060 | 146.097 |
| 19 | 21 | Neil Bonnett | Wood Brothers Racing | Ford | 25.090 | 145.923 |
| 20 | 2 | Ernie Irvan | U.S. Racing | Pontiac | 25.093 | 145.905 |
Failed to lock in Round 1
| 21 | 27 | Rusty Wallace | Blue Max Racing | Pontiac | 25.080 | 145.981 |
| 22 | 44 | Jim Sauter | Group 44 | Pontiac | 25.124 | 145.725 |
| 23 | 75 | Morgan Shepherd | RahMoc Enterprises | Pontiac | 25.148 | 145.586 |
| 24 | 83 | Lake Speed | Speed Racing | Oldsmobile | 25.201 | 145.280 |
| 25 | 53 | Jerry O'Neil | Aroneck Racing | Oldsmobile | 25.219 | 145.176 |
| 26 | 30 | Michael Waltrip | Bahari Racing | Pontiac | 25.243 | 145.038 |
| 27 | 4 | Rick Wilson | Morgan–McClure Motorsports | Oldsmobile | 25.258 | 144.952 |
| 28 | 8 | Bobby Hillin Jr. | Stavola Brothers Racing | Buick | 25.258 | 144.952 |
| 29 | 55 | Phil Parsons | Jackson Bros. Motorsports | Oldsmobile | 25.271 | 144.878 |
| 30 | 48 | Greg Sacks | Winkle Motorsports | Pontiac | 25.395 | 144.170 |
| 31 | 88 | Jimmy Spencer (R) | Baker–Schiff Racing | Pontiac | 25.449 | 143.864 |
| 32 | 29 | Dale Jarrett | Cale Yarborough Motorsports | Pontiac | 25.455 | 143.830 |
| 33 | 71 | Dave Marcis | Marcis Auto Racing | Chevrolet | 25.499 | 143.582 |
| 34 | 43 | Richard Petty | Petty Enterprises | Pontiac | 25.505 | 143.548 |
| 35 | 62 | Joe Ruttman | Douglas Smith Racing | Oldsmobile | 25.506 | 143.543 |
| 36 | 42 | Kyle Petty | SABCO Racing | Pontiac | 25.527 | 143.425 |
| 37 | 52 | Jimmy Means | Jimmy Means Racing | Pontiac | 25.718 | 142.359 |
| 38 | 93 | Charlie Baker | Salmon Racing | Buick | 25.851 | 141.627 |
| 39 | 34 | Jim Bown | AAG Racing | Buick | 25.905 | 141.332 |
| 40 | 54 | Bob Schacht | Schacht Racing | Buick | 25.998 | 140.826 |
Official first round qualifying results
Official starting lineup

== Race results ==
| Fin | St | # | Driver | Team | Make | Laps | Led | Status | Pts | Winnings |
|---|---|---|---|---|---|---|---|---|---|---|
| 1 | 7 | 6 | Mark Martin | Roush Racing | Ford | 492 | 101 | running | 185 | $52,800 |
| 2 | 21 | 27 | Rusty Wallace | Blue Max Racing | Pontiac | 492 | 194 | running | 180 | $33,675 |
| 3 | 2 | 17 | Darrell Waltrip | Hendrick Motorsports | Chevrolet | 492 | 24 | running | 170 | $32,225 |
| 4 | 9 | 25 | Ken Schrader | Hendrick Motorsports | Chevrolet | 491 | 0 | running | 160 | $16,725 |
| 5 | 16 | 84 | Dick Trickle (R) | Stavola Brothers Racing | Buick | 491 | 0 | running | 155 | $15,250 |
| 6 | 19 | 21 | Neil Bonnett | Wood Brothers Racing | Ford | 491 | 0 | running | 150 | $10,550 |
| 7 | 11 | 5 | Geoff Bodine | Hendrick Motorsports | Chevrolet | 490 | 0 | running | 146 | $12,275 |
| 8 | 28 | 8 | Bobby Hillin Jr. | Stavola Brothers Racing | Buick | 490 | 0 | running | 142 | $9,575 |
| 9 | 1 | 7 | Alan Kulwicki | AK Racing | Ford | 490 | 6 | running | 143 | $13,225 |
| 10 | 36 | 42 | Kyle Petty | SABCO Racing | Pontiac | 489 | 0 | running | 134 | $10,107 |
| 11 | 6 | 10 | Derrike Cope | Whitcomb Racing | Pontiac | 489 | 0 | running | 130 | $6,625 |
| 12 | 3 | 16 | Larry Pearson (R) | Pearson Racing | Buick | 488 | 0 | running | 127 | $6,575 |
| 13 | 27 | 4 | Rick Wilson | Morgan–McClure Motorsports | Oldsmobile | 488 | 0 | running | 124 | $7,950 |
| 14 | 15 | 11 | Terry Labonte | Junior Johnson & Associates | Ford | 488 | 0 | running | 121 | $13,725 |
| 15 | 4 | 9 | Bill Elliott | Melling Racing | Ford | 488 | 0 | running | 118 | $17,500 |
| 16 | 20 | 2 | Ernie Irvan | U.S. Racing | Pontiac | 487 | 0 | running | 115 | $5,075 |
| 17 | 26 | 30 | Michael Waltrip | Bahari Racing | Pontiac | 486 | 0 | running | 112 | $6,775 |
| 18 | 30 | 48 | Greg Sacks | Winkle Motorsports | Pontiac | 485 | 0 | running | 109 | $3,475 |
| 19 | 24 | 83 | Lake Speed | Speed Racing | Oldsmobile | 485 | 0 | running | 106 | $9,875 |
| 20 | 5 | 3 | Dale Earnhardt | Richard Childress Racing | Chevrolet | 484 | 86 | running | 108 | $13,775 |
| 21 | 14 | 15 | Brett Bodine | Bud Moore Engineering | Ford | 484 | 1 | running | 105 | $6,375 |
| 22 | 18 | 57 | Hut Stricklin (R) | Osterlund Racing | Pontiac | 474 | 0 | running | 97 | $3,700 |
| 23 | 10 | 94 | Sterling Marlin | Hagan Racing | Oldsmobile | 471 | 0 | running | 94 | $5,500 |
| 24 | 29 | 55 | Phil Parsons | Jackson Bros. Motorsports | Oldsmobile | 470 | 0 | running | 91 | $5,375 |
| 25 | 40 | 54 | Bob Schacht | Schacht Racing | Buick | 463 | 0 | running | 88 | $2,700 |
| 26 | 13 | 28 | Davey Allison | Robert Yates Racing | Ford | 460 | 2 | running | 90 | $10,950 |
| 27 | 35 | 62 | Joe Ruttman | Douglas Smith Racing | Oldsmobile | 459 | 0 | running | 82 | $2,500 |
| 28 | 8 | 26 | Ricky Rudd | King Racing | Buick | 456 | 66 | running | 84 | $10,700 |
| 29 | 12 | 33 | Harry Gant | Jackson Bros. Motorsports | Oldsmobile | 446 | 4 | running | 81 | $10,025 |
| 30 | 33 | 71 | Dave Marcis | Marcis Auto Racing | Chevrolet | 443 | 0 | running | 73 | $5,500 |
| 31 | 37 | 52 | Jimmy Means | Jimmy Means Racing | Pontiac | 341 | 0 | engine | 70 | $2,200 |
| 32 | 17 | 47 | Jack Pennington | Close Racing | Chevrolet | 277 | 0 | handling | 0 | $2,150 |
| 33 | 22 | 44 | Jim Sauter | Group 44 | Pontiac | 249 | 8 | brakes | 69 | $2,080 |
| 34 | 34 | 43 | Richard Petty | Petty Enterprises | Pontiac | 247 | 0 | handling | 61 | $4,280 |
| 35 | 31 | 88 | Jimmy Spencer (R) | Baker–Schiff Racing | Pontiac | 225 | 0 | crash | 58 | $4,605 |
| 36 | 23 | 75 | Morgan Shepherd | RahMoc Enterprises | Pontiac | 206 | 0 | crash | 55 | $9,925 |
| 37 | 39 | 34 | Jim Bown | AAG Racing | Buick | 195 | 0 | handling | 52 | $1,900 |
| 38 | 25 | 53 | Jerry O'Neil | Aroneck Racing | Oldsmobile | 112 | 0 | axle | 49 | $1,875 |
| 39 | 32 | 29 | Dale Jarrett | Cale Yarborough Motorsports | Pontiac | 74 | 0 | clutch | 46 | $4,450 |
| 40 | 38 | 93 | Charlie Baker | Salmon Racing | Buick | 37 | 0 | oil pump | 43 | $1,825 |
Official race results

== Standings after the race ==
Drivers' Championship standings

| | Pos | Driver | Points |
|---|---|---|---|
| | 1 | Rusty Wallace | 3,938 |
| | 2 | Dale Earnhardt | 3,829 (-109) |
| | 3 | Mark Martin | 3,810 (-128) |
| | 4 | Darrell Waltrip | 3,646 (–292) |
| | 5 | Bill Elliott | 3,512 (–426) |
| | 6 | Ken Schrader | 3,492 (–446) |
| | 7 | Ricky Rudd | 3,401 (–537) |
| | 8 | Harry Gant | 3,356 (–582) |
| 1 | 9 | Terry Labonte | 3,351 (–587) |
| 1 | 10 | Geoff Bodine | 3,346 (–592) |
Official driver's standings

- Note: Only the first 10 positions are included for the driver standings.

| Previous race: 1989 Holly Farms 400 | NASCAR Winston Cup Series; 1989 season | Next race: 1989 Autoworks 500 |
