= 1989 Busch 500 =

20th race of the 1989 NASCAR Winston Cup Series

Race details
- Race 20 of 29 in the 1989 NASCAR Winston Cup Series
- The 1989 Busch 500 program cover, featuring Dale Earnhardt.
- Date: August 26, 1989
- Official name: 29th Annual Busch 500
- Location: Bristol, Tennessee, Bristol International Speedway
- Course: Permanent racing facility
- Course length: 0.533 miles (0.858 km)
- Distance: 500 laps, 266.5 mi (428.89 km)
- Scheduled distance: 500 laps, 266.5 mi (428.89 km)
- Average speed: 85.554 miles per hour (137.686 km/h)
- Attendance: 54,000

Pole position
Driver	Alan Kulwicki	AK Racing
- Time: 16.394

Most laps led
Driver	Darrell Waltrip	Hendrick Motorsports
- Laps: 239

Winner
No. 17	Darrell Waltrip	Hendrick Motorsports

Television in the United States
- Network: ESPN
- Announcers: Bob Jenkins, Ned Jarrett, Benny Parsons

Radio in the United States
- Radio: Motor Racing Network

The 1989 Busch 500 was the 20th stock car race of the 1989 NASCAR Winston Cup Series season and the 29th iteration of the event. The race was held on Saturday, August 26, 1989, before an audience of 54,000 in Bristol, Tennessee, at Bristol International Speedway, a 0.533 miles (0.858 km) permanent oval-shaped racetrack. The race took the scheduled 500 laps to complete. At race's end, Hendrick Motorsports driver Darrell Waltrip would manage to dominate the late stages of the race, leading the final 206 laps to take his 78th career NASCAR Winston Cup Series victory and his fifth victory of the season. To fill out the top three, owner-driver Alan Kulwicki and King Racing driver Ricky Rudd would finish second and third, respectively.

== Background ==
The layout of Bristol Motor Speedway, the venue where the race was held.

The Bristol Motor Speedway, formerly known as Bristol International Raceway and Bristol Raceway, is a NASCAR short track venue located in Bristol, Tennessee. Constructed in 1960, it held its first NASCAR race on July 30, 1961. Despite its short length, Bristol is among the most popular tracks on the NASCAR schedule because of its distinct features, which include extraordinarily steep banking, an all concrete surface, two pit roads, and stadium-like seating. It has also been named one of the loudest NASCAR tracks.

=== Entry list ===
- (R) denotes rookie driver.

#	Driver	Team	Make	Sponsor
1	Tommy Ellis	Wood Brothers Racing	Ford	Wood Brothers Racing
2	Ernie Irvan	U.S. Racing	Pontiac	Kroger
3	Dale Earnhardt	Richard Childress Racing	Chevrolet	GM Goodwrench Service Plus
4	Rick Wilson	Morgan–McClure Motorsports	Oldsmobile	Kodak
5	Geoff Bodine	Hendrick Motorsports	Chevrolet	Levi Garrett
6	Mark Martin	Roush Racing	Ford	Stroh's Light
7	Alan Kulwicki	AK Racing	Ford	Zerex
8	Bobby Hillin Jr.	Stavola Brothers Racing	Buick	Miller High Life
9	Bill Elliott	Melling Racing	Ford	Coors Light
10	Derrike Cope	Whitcomb Racing	Pontiac	Purolator
11	Terry Labonte	Junior Johnson & Associates	Ford	Budweiser
15	Brett Bodine	Bud Moore Engineering	Ford	Motorcraft
16	Larry Pearson (R)	Pearson Racing	Buick	Chattanooga Chew
17	Darrell Waltrip	Hendrick Motorsports	Chevrolet	Tide
21	Neil Bonnett	Wood Brothers Racing	Ford	Citgo
25	Ken Schrader	Hendrick Motorsports	Chevrolet	Folgers
26	Ricky Rudd	King Racing	Buick	Quaker State
27	Rusty Wallace	Blue Max Racing	Pontiac	Kodiak
28	Davey Allison	Robert Yates Racing	Ford	Texaco, Havoline
29	Dale Jarrett	Cale Yarborough Motorsports	Pontiac	Hardee's
30	Michael Waltrip	Bahari Racing	Pontiac	Country Time
33	Harry Gant	Jackson Bros. Motorsports	Oldsmobile	Skoal Bandit
42	Kyle Petty	SABCO Racing	Pontiac	Peak Antifreeze
43	Richard Petty	Petty Enterprises	Pontiac	STP
44	Jim Sauter	Group 44	Pontiac	Group 44
48	Greg Sacks	Winkle Motorsports	Pontiac	Dinner Bell Foods
52	Jimmy Means	Jimmy Means Racing	Pontiac	Alka-Seltzer
55	Phil Parsons	Jackson Bros. Motorsports	Oldsmobile	Skoal, Crown Central Petroleum
57	Hut Stricklin (R)	Osterlund Racing	Pontiac	Heinz
66	Rick Mast (R)	Mach 1 Racing	Chevrolet	Food City
71	Dave Marcis	Marcis Auto Racing	Chevrolet	Lifebuoy
75	Morgan Shepherd	RahMoc Enterprises	Pontiac	Valvoline
83	Joe Ruttman	Speed Racing	Oldsmobile	Bull's-Eye Barbecue Sauce
84	Dick Trickle (R)	Stavola Brothers Racing	Buick	Miller High Life
88	Jimmy Spencer (R)	Baker–Schiff Racing	Pontiac	Crisco
94	Sterling Marlin	Hagan Racing	Oldsmobile	Sunoco

== Qualifying ==
Qualifying was split into two rounds. The first round was held on Friday, August 25, at 7:35 PM EST. Each driver would have one lap to set a time. During the first round, the top 15 drivers in the round would be guaranteed a starting spot in the race. If a driver was not able to guarantee a spot in the first round, they had the option to scrub their time from the first round and try and run a faster lap time in a second round qualifying run, held on Saturday, August 26, at 1:00 PM EST. As with the first round, each driver would have one lap to set a time. For this specific race, positions 15-30 would be decided on time, and depending on who needed it, a select amount of positions were given to cars who had not otherwise qualified on time but were high enough in owner's points; up to two provisionals were given.

Alan Kulwicki, driving for his own AK Racing team, would win the pole, setting a time of 16.394 and an average speed of 117.043 miles per hour (188.362 km/h) in the first round.

Four drivers would fail to qualify.

=== Full qualifying results ===
Pos.	#	Driver	Team	Make	Time	Speed
1	7	Alan Kulwicki	AK Racing	Ford	16.394	117.043
2	5	Geoff Bodine	Hendrick Motorsports	Chevrolet	16.406	116.957
3	15	Brett Bodine	Bud Moore Engineering	Ford	16.447	116.666
4	25	Ken Schrader	Hendrick Motorsports	Chevrolet	16.472	116.489
5	94	Sterling Marlin	Hagan Racing	Oldsmobile	16.494	116.333
6	26	Ricky Rudd	King Racing	Buick	16.537	116.031
7	3	Dale Earnhardt	Richard Childress Racing	Chevrolet	16.563	115.849
8	2	Ernie Irvan	U.S. Racing	Pontiac	16.567	115.821
9	17	Darrell Waltrip	Hendrick Motorsports	Chevrolet	16.584	115.702
10	27	Rusty Wallace	Blue Max Racing	Pontiac	16.604	115.563
11	30	Michael Waltrip	Bahari Racing	Pontiac	16.605	115.556
12	88	Jimmy Spencer (R)	Baker–Schiff Racing	Pontiac	16.619	115.458
13	66	Rick Mast (R)	Mach 1 Racing	Chevrolet	16.621	115.444
14	33	Harry Gant	Jackson Bros. Motorsports	Oldsmobile	16.637	115.333
15	10	Derrike Cope	Whitcomb Racing	Pontiac	16.656	115.202
Failed to lock in Round 1
16	11	Terry Labonte	Junior Johnson & Associates	Ford	16.687	114.988
17	55	Phil Parsons	Jackson Bros. Motorsports	Oldsmobile	16.776	114.374
18	4	Rick Wilson	Morgan–McClure Motorsports	Oldsmobile	16.693	114.946
19	16	Larry Pearson (R)	Pearson Racing	Buick	16.727	114.713
20	28	Davey Allison	Robert Yates Racing	Ford	16.735	114.658
21	9	Bill Elliott	Melling Racing	Ford	16.750	114.555
22	84	Dick Trickle (R)	Stavola Brothers Racing	Buick	16.754	114.528
23	6	Mark Martin	Roush Racing	Ford	16.780	114.350
24	8	Bobby Hillin Jr.	Stavola Brothers Racing	Buick	16.804	114.187
25	83	Joe Ruttman	Speed Racing	Oldsmobile	16.811	114.140
26	48	Greg Sacks	Winkle Motorsports	Pontiac	16.873	113.720
27	42	Kyle Petty	SABCO Racing	Pontiac	16.883	113.653
28	71	Dave Marcis	Marcis Auto Racing	Chevrolet	16.900	113.538
29	75	Morgan Shepherd	RahMoc Enterprises	Pontiac	16.992	112.924
30	29	Dale Jarrett	Cale Yarborough Motorsports	Pontiac	17.116	112.106
Provisionals
31	21	Neil Bonnett	Wood Brothers Racing	Ford	17.127	112.034
32	57	Hut Stricklin (R)	Osterlund Racing	Pontiac	17.270	111.106
Failed to qualify
33	43	Richard Petty	Petty Enterprises	Pontiac	-*	-*
34	1	Tommy Ellis	Wood Brothers Racing	Ford	-*	-*
35	44	Jim Sauter	Group 44	Pontiac	-*	-*
36	52	Jimmy Means	Jimmy Means Racing	Pontiac	-*	-*
Official first round qualifying results
Official starting lineup

== Race results ==
Fin	St	#	Driver	Team	Make	Laps	Led	Status	Pts	Winnings
1	9	17	Darrell Waltrip	Hendrick Motorsports	Chevrolet	500	239	running	185	$52,450
2	1	7	Alan Kulwicki	AK Racing	Ford	500	27	running	175	$30,875
3	6	26	Ricky Rudd	King Racing	Buick	500	0	running	165	$19,200
4	14	33	Harry Gant	Jackson Bros. Motorsports	Oldsmobile	500	0	running	160	$13,300
5	16	11	Terry Labonte	Junior Johnson & Associates	Ford	499	0	running	155	$13,400
6	10	27	Rusty Wallace	Blue Max Racing	Pontiac	499	24	running	155	$12,125
7	24	8	Bobby Hillin Jr.	Stavola Brothers Racing	Buick	498	0	running	146	$7,800
8	12	88	Jimmy Spencer (R)	Baker–Schiff Racing	Pontiac	496	0	running	142	$7,900
9	31	21	Neil Bonnett	Wood Brothers Racing	Ford	495	0	running	138	$9,307
10	30	29	Dale Jarrett	Cale Yarborough Motorsports	Pontiac	494	0	running	134	$10,975
11	17	55	Phil Parsons	Jackson Bros. Motorsports	Oldsmobile	494	0	running	130	$6,100
12	28	71	Dave Marcis	Marcis Auto Racing	Chevrolet	493	0	running	127	$5,900
13	13	66	Rick Mast (R)	Mach 1 Racing	Chevrolet	492	0	running	124	$3,150
14	7	3	Dale Earnhardt	Richard Childress Racing	Chevrolet	490	145	running	126	$11,650
15	8	2	Ernie Irvan	U.S. Racing	Pontiac	489	0	running	118	$4,700
16	2	5	Geoff Bodine	Hendrick Motorsports	Chevrolet	489	65	running	120	$8,850
17	3	15	Brett Bodine	Bud Moore Engineering	Ford	488	0	running	112	$5,525
18	5	94	Sterling Marlin	Hagan Racing	Oldsmobile	464	0	running	109	$4,950
19	32	57	Hut Stricklin (R)	Osterlund Racing	Pontiac	463	0	running	106	$3,250
20	23	6	Mark Martin	Roush Racing	Ford	458	0	running	103	$5,500
21	19	16	Larry Pearson (R)	Pearson Racing	Buick	444	0	overheating	100	$3,025
22	27	42	Kyle Petty	SABCO Racing	Pontiac	322	0	accident	97	$2,250
23	4	25	Ken Schrader	Hendrick Motorsports	Chevrolet	294	0	engine	94	$7,295
24	21	9	Bill Elliott	Melling Racing	Ford	246	0	engine	91	$11,190
25	20	28	Davey Allison	Robert Yates Racing	Ford	241	0	running	88	$8,935
26	29	75	Morgan Shepherd	RahMoc Enterprises	Pontiac	223	0	engine	85	$8,680
27	18	4	Rick Wilson	Morgan–McClure Motorsports	Oldsmobile	142	0	engine	82	$4,350
28	22	84	Dick Trickle (R)	Stavola Brothers Racing	Buick	126	0	accident	79	$4,300
29	15	10	Derrike Cope	Whitcomb Racing	Pontiac	121	0	accident	76	$2,725
30	26	48	Greg Sacks	Winkle Motorsports	Pontiac	59	0	engine	0	$2,600
31	25	83	Joe Ruttman	Speed Racing	Oldsmobile	57	0	accident	0	$3,600
32	11	30	Michael Waltrip	Bahari Racing	Pontiac	57	0	accident	67	$4,100
Failed to qualify
33		43	Richard Petty	Petty Enterprises	Pontiac					
34		1	Tommy Ellis	Wood Brothers Racing	Ford					
35		44	Jim Sauter	Group 44	Pontiac					
36		52	Jimmy Means	Jimmy Means Racing	Pontiac					
Official race results

== Standings after the race ==
Drivers' Championship standings

	Pos	Driver	Points
	1	Dale Earnhardt	2,852
	2	Rusty Wallace	2,799 (-53)
	3	Mark Martin	2,734 (-118)
	4	Darrell Waltrip	2,711 (–141)
	5	Davey Allison	2,553 (–299)
	6	Bill Elliott	2,531 (–321)
1	7	Terry Labonte	2,488 (–364)
1	8	Ken Schrader	2,473 (–379)
1	9	Ricky Rudd	2,457 (–395)
1	10	Geoff Bodine	2,434 (–418)
Official driver's standings

- Note: Only the first 10 positions are included for the driver standings.

Previous race: 1989 Champion Spark Plug 400	NASCAR Winston Cup Series; 1989 season	Next race: 1989 Heinz Southern 500
