= 1989 TranSouth 500 =

Fifth race of the 1989 NASCAR Winston Cup Series

Race details
- Race 5 of 29 in the 1989 NASCAR Winston Cup Series
- The 1989 TranSouth 500 program cover, featuring Lake Speed.
- Date: April 2, 1989
- Official name: 33rd Annual TranSouth 500
- Location: Darlington, South Carolina, Darlington Raceway
- Course: Permanent racing facility
- Course length: 1.366 miles (2.198 km)
- Distance: 367 laps, 501.322 mi (806.799 km)
- Scheduled distance: 367 laps, 501.322 mi (806.799 km)
- Average speed: 115.475 miles per hour (185.839 km/h)
- Attendance: 45,000

Pole position
| Driver | Mark Martin | Roush Racing |
- Time: 30.523

Most laps led
| Driver | Harry Gant | Jackson Bros. Motorsports |
- Laps: 179

Winner
| No. 33 | Harry Gant | Jackson Bros. Motorsports |

Television in the United States
- Network: ESPN
- Announcers: Bob Jenkins, Ned Jarrett, Benny Parsons

Radio in the United States
- Radio: Motor Racing Network

The 1989 TranSouth 500 was the fifth stock car race of the 1989 NASCAR Winston Cup Series and the 33rd iteration of the event. The race was held on Sunday, April 2, 1989, before an audience of 45,000 in Darlington, South Carolina, at Darlington Raceway, a 1.366 miles (2.198 km) permanent egg-shaped oval racetrack. The race took the scheduled 367 laps to complete. At race's end, Jackson Bros. Motorsports driver Harry Gant would manage to dominate the late stages of the race to take his 10th career NASCAR Winston Cup Series victory, his only victory of the season, and his first victory in 90 NASCAR Winston Cup Series races. To fill out the top three, Robert Yates Racing driver Davey Allison and Hendrick Motorsports driver Geoff Bodine would finish second and third, respectively.

== Background ==
The layout of Darlington Raceway, the venue where the race was held.

Darlington Raceway is a race track built for NASCAR racing located near Darlington, South Carolina. It is nicknamed "The Lady in Black" and "The Track Too Tough to Tame" by many NASCAR fans and drivers and advertised as "A NASCAR Tradition." It is of a unique, somewhat egg-shaped design, an oval with the ends of very different configurations, a condition which supposedly arose from the proximity of one end of the track to a minnow pond the owner refused to relocate. This situation makes it very challenging for the crews to set up their cars' handling in a way that is effective at both ends.

=== Entry list ===
- (R) denotes rookie driver.

| # | Driver | Team | Make | Sponsor |
|---|---|---|---|---|
| 2 | Ernie Irvan | U.S. Racing | Pontiac | Kroger |
| 3 | Dale Earnhardt | Richard Childress Racing | Chevrolet | GM Goodwrench Service Plus |
| 4 | Rick Wilson | Morgan–McClure Motorsports | Oldsmobile | Kodak |
| 5 | Geoff Bodine | Hendrick Motorsports | Chevrolet | Levi Garrett |
| 6 | Mark Martin | Roush Racing | Ford | Stroh's Light |
| 7 | Alan Kulwicki | AK Racing | Ford | Zerex |
| 8 | Bobby Hillin Jr. | Stavola Brothers Racing | Buick | Miller High Life |
| 9 | Bill Elliott | Melling Racing | Ford | Coors Light |
| 10 | Ken Bouchard | Whitcomb Racing | Pontiac | Whitcomb Racing |
| 11 | Terry Labonte | Junior Johnson & Associates | Ford | Budweiser |
| 15 | Brett Bodine | Bud Moore Engineering | Ford | Motorcraft |
| 16 | Larry Pearson (R) | Pearson Racing | Buick | Chattanooga Chew |
| 17 | Darrell Waltrip | Hendrick Motorsports | Chevrolet | Tide |
| 21 | Neil Bonnett | Wood Brothers Racing | Ford | Citgo |
| 23 | Eddie Bierschwale | B&B Racing | Oldsmobile | B&B Racing |
| 25 | Ken Schrader | Hendrick Motorsports | Chevrolet | Folgers |
| 26 | Ricky Rudd | King Racing | Buick | Quaker State |
| 27 | Rusty Wallace | Blue Max Racing | Pontiac | Kodiak |
| 28 | Davey Allison | Robert Yates Racing | Ford | Texaco, Havoline |
| 29 | Dale Jarrett | Cale Yarborough Motorsports | Pontiac | Hardee's |
| 30 | Michael Waltrip | Bahari Racing | Pontiac | Country Time |
| 31 | Jim Sauter | Bob Clark Motorsports | Pontiac | Slender You Figure Salons |
| 33 | Harry Gant | Jackson Bros. Motorsports | Oldsmobile | Skoal Bandit |
| 34 | Rodney Combs | AAG Racing | Buick | AAG Racing |
| 40 | Ben Hess (R) | Hess Racing | Oldsmobile | Hess Racing |
| 42 | Kyle Petty | SABCO Racing | Pontiac | Peak Antifreeze |
| 43 | Richard Petty | Petty Enterprises | Pontiac | STP |
| 52 | Jimmy Means | Jimmy Means Racing | Pontiac | Alka-Seltzer |
| 55 | Phil Parsons | Jackson Bros. Motorsports | Oldsmobile | Skoal, Crown Central Petroleum |
| 57 | Hut Stricklin (R) | Osterlund Racing | Pontiac | Heinz |
| 66 | Rick Mast (R) | Mach 1 Racing | Chevrolet | Banquet Foods |
| 68 | Derrike Cope | Testa Racing | Pontiac | Purolator |
| 70 | J. D. McDuffie | McDuffie Racing | Pontiac | Rumple Furniture |
| 71 | Dave Marcis | Marcis Auto Racing | Chevrolet | Lifebuoy |
| 75 | Morgan Shepherd | RahMoc Enterprises | Pontiac | Valvoline |
| 80 | Jimmy Horton | S&H Racing | Pontiac | Miles Concrete |
| 83 | Lake Speed | Speed Racing | Oldsmobile | Bull's-Eye Barbecue Sauce |
| 84 | Dick Trickle (R) | Stavola Brothers Racing | Buick | Miller High Life |
| 88 | Greg Sacks | Baker–Schiff Racing | Pontiac | Crisco |
| 90 | Chad Little (R) | Donlavey Racing | Ford | Donlavey Racing |
| 94 | Sterling Marlin | Hagan Racing | Oldsmobile | Sunoco |

== Qualifying ==
Qualifying was split into two rounds. The first round was held on Thursday, March 30, at 2:00 PM EST. Each driver would have one lap to set a time. During the first round, the top 20 drivers in the round would be guaranteed a starting spot in the race. If a driver was not able to guarantee a spot in the first round, they had the option to scrub their time from the first round and try and run a faster lap time in a second round qualifying run, held on Friday, March 31, at 10:30 AM EST. As with the first round, each driver would have one lap to set a time. For this specific race, positions 21-40 would be decided on time, and depending on who needed it, a select amount of positions were given to cars who had not otherwise qualified but were high enough in owner's points; up to two were given.

Mark Martin, driving for Roush Racing, would win the pole, setting a time of 30.523 and an average speed of 161.111 miles per hour (259.283 km/h) in the first round.

No drivers would fail to qualify.

=== Full qualifying results ===
| Pos. | # | Driver | Team | Make | Time | Speed |
|---|---|---|---|---|---|---|
| 1 | 6 | Mark Martin | Roush Racing | Ford | 30.523 | 161.111 |
| 2 | 15 | Brett Bodine | Bud Moore Engineering | Ford | 30.799 | 159.668 |
| 3 | 7 | Alan Kulwicki | AK Racing | Ford | 30.823 | 159.543 |
| 4 | 28 | Davey Allison | Robert Yates Racing | Ford | 30.831 | 159.502 |
| 5 | 27 | Rusty Wallace | Blue Max Racing | Pontiac | 30.850 | 159.404 |
| 6 | 25 | Ken Schrader | Hendrick Motorsports | Chevrolet | 30.892 | 159.187 |
| 7 | 17 | Darrell Waltrip | Hendrick Motorsports | Chevrolet | 30.934 | 158.971 |
| 8 | 5 | Geoff Bodine | Hendrick Motorsports | Chevrolet | 30.941 | 158.935 |
| 9 | 29 | Dale Jarrett | Cale Yarborough Motorsports | Pontiac | 30.955 | 158.863 |
| 10 | 33 | Harry Gant | Jackson Bros. Motorsports | Oldsmobile | 30.960 | 158.837 |
| 11 | 3 | Dale Earnhardt | Richard Childress Racing | Chevrolet | 30.968 | 158.796 |
| 12 | 75 | Morgan Shepherd | RahMoc Enterprises | Pontiac | 31.009 | 158.586 |
| 13 | 9 | Bill Elliott | Melling Racing | Ford | 31.036 | 158.448 |
| 14 | 83 | Lake Speed | Speed Racing | Oldsmobile | 31.159 | 157.823 |
| 15 | 8 | Bobby Hillin Jr. | Stavola Brothers Racing | Buick | 31.162 | 157.808 |
| 16 | 88 | Greg Sacks | Baker–Schiff Racing | Pontiac | 31.180 | 157.716 |
| 17 | 4 | Rick Wilson | Morgan–McClure Motorsports | Oldsmobile | 31.185 | 157.691 |
| 18 | 2 | Ernie Irvan | U.S. Racing | Pontiac | 31.279 | 157.217 |
| 19 | 11 | Terry Labonte | Junior Johnson & Associates | Ford | 31.292 | 157.152 |
| 20 | 21 | Neil Bonnett | Wood Brothers Racing | Ford | 31.306 | 157.082 |
Failed to lock in Round 1
| 21 | 55 | Phil Parsons | Jackson Bros. Motorsports | Oldsmobile | 31.336 | 156.931 |
| 22 | 71 | Dave Marcis | Marcis Auto Racing | Chevrolet | 31.346 | 156.881 |
| 23 | 30 | Michael Waltrip | Bahari Racing | Pontiac | 31.368 | 156.771 |
| 24 | 66 | Rick Mast (R) | Mach 1 Racing | Chevrolet | 31.402 | 156.601 |
| 25 | 26 | Ricky Rudd | King Racing | Buick | 31.446 | 156.382 |
| 26 | 94 | Sterling Marlin | Hagan Racing | Oldsmobile | 31.447 | 156.377 |
| 27 | 52 | Jimmy Means | Jimmy Means Racing | Pontiac | 31.482 | 156.204 |
| 28 | 84 | Dick Trickle (R) | Stavola Brothers Racing | Buick | 31.541 | 155.911 |
| 29 | 40 | Ben Hess (R) | Hess Racing | Oldsmobile | 31.557 | 155.832 |
| 30 | 42 | Kyle Petty | SABCO Racing | Pontiac | 31.596 | 155.640 |
| 31 | 80 | Jimmy Horton | S&H Racing | Pontiac | 31.637 | 155.438 |
| 32 | 23 | Eddie Bierschwale | B&B Racing | Oldsmobile | 31.650 | 155.374 |
| 33 | 43 | Richard Petty | Petty Enterprises | Pontiac | 31.693 | 155.164 |
| 34 | 10 | Ken Bouchard | Whitcomb Racing | Pontiac | 31.729 | 154.988 |
| 35 | 34 | Rodney Combs | AAG Racing | Buick | 31.742 | 154.924 |
| 36 | 16 | Larry Pearson (R) | Pearson Racing | Buick | 31.794 | 154.671 |
| 37 | 68 | Derrike Cope | Testa Racing | Pontiac | 31.854 | 154.379 |
| 38 | 31 | Jim Sauter | Bob Clark Motorsports | Pontiac | 31.991 | 153.718 |
| 39 | 57 | Hut Stricklin (R) | Osterlund Racing | Pontiac | 32.229 | 152.583 |
| 40 | 70 | J. D. McDuffie | McDuffie Racing | Pontiac | 32.503 | 151.297 |
Provisional
| 41 | 90 | Chad Little (R) | Donlavey Racing | Ford | 32.589 | 150.898 |
Official first round qualifying results
Official starting lineup

== Race results ==
| Fin | St | # | Driver | Team | Make | Laps | Led | Status | Pts | Winnings |
|---|---|---|---|---|---|---|---|---|---|---|
| 1 | 10 | 33 | Harry Gant | Jackson Bros. Motorsports | Oldsmobile | 367 | 179 | running | 185 | $59,935 |
| 2 | 4 | 28 | Davey Allison | Robert Yates Racing | Ford | 367 | 4 | running | 175 | $35,435 |
| 3 | 8 | 5 | Geoff Bodine | Hendrick Motorsports | Chevrolet | 367 | 1 | running | 170 | $25,345 |
| 4 | 1 | 6 | Mark Martin | Roush Racing | Ford | 367 | 18 | running | 165 | $18,810 |
| 5 | 26 | 94 | Sterling Marlin | Hagan Racing | Oldsmobile | 367 | 0 | running | 155 | $18,270 |
| 6 | 13 | 9 | Bill Elliott | Melling Racing | Ford | 367 | 0 | running | 150 | $17,725 |
| 7 | 3 | 7 | Alan Kulwicki | AK Racing | Ford | 366 | 56 | running | 151 | $10,750 |
| 8 | 5 | 27 | Rusty Wallace | Blue Max Racing | Pontiac | 366 | 64 | running | 147 | $15,120 |
| 9 | 23 | 30 | Michael Waltrip | Bahari Racing | Pontiac | 366 | 0 | running | 138 | $8,820 |
| 10 | 14 | 83 | Lake Speed | Speed Racing | Oldsmobile | 366 | 2 | running | 139 | $10,675 |
| 11 | 17 | 4 | Rick Wilson | Morgan–McClure Motorsports | Oldsmobile | 366 | 0 | running | 130 | $7,850 |
| 12 | 25 | 26 | Ricky Rudd | King Racing | Buick | 365 | 0 | running | 127 | $7,425 |
| 13 | 28 | 84 | Dick Trickle (R) | Stavola Brothers Racing | Buick | 365 | 0 | running | 124 | $8,250 |
| 14 | 2 | 15 | Brett Bodine | Bud Moore Engineering | Ford | 365 | 0 | running | 121 | $6,725 |
| 15 | 33 | 43 | Richard Petty | Petty Enterprises | Pontiac | 364 | 0 | running | 118 | $4,955 |
| 16 | 12 | 75 | Morgan Shepherd | RahMoc Enterprises | Pontiac | 363 | 0 | running | 115 | $11,300 |
| 17 | 22 | 71 | Dave Marcis | Marcis Auto Racing | Chevrolet | 363 | 0 | running | 112 | $5,935 |
| 18 | 19 | 11 | Terry Labonte | Junior Johnson & Associates | Ford | 362 | 1 | running | 109 | $9,875 |
| 19 | 38 | 31 | Jim Sauter | Bob Clark Motorsports | Pontiac | 361 | 0 | running | 106 | $3,610 |
| 20 | 36 | 16 | Larry Pearson (R) | Pearson Racing | Buick | 361 | 0 | running | 103 | $3,725 |
| 21 | 32 | 23 | Eddie Bierschwale | B&B Racing | Oldsmobile | 359 | 0 | running | 100 | $2,570 |
| 22 | 34 | 10 | Ken Bouchard | Whitcomb Racing | Pontiac | 358 | 0 | running | 97 | $3,490 |
| 23 | 29 | 40 | Ben Hess (R) | Hess Racing | Oldsmobile | 357 | 0 | running | 94 | $2,435 |
| 24 | 18 | 2 | Ernie Irvan | U.S. Racing | Pontiac | 355 | 0 | running | 91 | $3,080 |
| 25 | 16 | 88 | Greg Sacks | Baker–Schiff Racing | Pontiac | 352 | 7 | crash | 93 | $5,925 |
| 26 | 15 | 8 | Bobby Hillin Jr. | Stavola Brothers Racing | Buick | 352 | 0 | crash | 85 | $4,870 |
| 27 | 6 | 25 | Ken Schrader | Hendrick Motorsports | Chevrolet | 350 | 0 | crash | 82 | $9,140 |
| 28 | 30 | 42 | Kyle Petty | SABCO Racing | Pontiac | 350 | 0 | crash | 79 | $2,095 |
| 29 | 35 | 34 | Rodney Combs | AAG Racing | Buick | 349 | 0 | running | 76 | $2,050 |
| 30 | 39 | 57 | Hut Stricklin (R) | Osterlund Racing | Pontiac | 341 | 0 | running | 73 | $2,050 |
| 31 | 40 | 70 | J. D. McDuffie | McDuffie Racing | Pontiac | 339 | 0 | running | 70 | $1,935 |
| 32 | 31 | 80 | Jimmy Horton | S&H Racing | Pontiac | 324 | 0 | engine | 67 | $1,895 |
| 33 | 11 | 3 | Dale Earnhardt | Richard Childress Racing | Chevrolet | 290 | 35 | running | 69 | $10,655 |
| 34 | 24 | 66 | Rick Mast (R) | Mach 1 Racing | Chevrolet | 284 | 0 | running | 61 | $5,090 |
| 35 | 37 | 68 | Derrike Cope | Testa Racing | Pontiac | 276 | 0 | oil pump | 58 | $1,790 |
| 36 | 7 | 17 | Darrell Waltrip | Hendrick Motorsports | Chevrolet | 261 | 0 | running | 55 | $10,355 |
| 37 | 41 | 90 | Chad Little (R) | Donlavey Racing | Ford | 257 | 0 | engine | 52 | $2,350 |
| 38 | 27 | 52 | Jimmy Means | Jimmy Means Racing | Pontiac | 211 | 0 | rear end | 49 | $1,710 |
| 39 | 20 | 21 | Neil Bonnett | Wood Brothers Racing | Ford | 162 | 0 | valve | 46 | $4,295 |
| 40 | 9 | 29 | Dale Jarrett | Cale Yarborough Motorsports | Pontiac | 83 | 0 | engine | 43 | $3,645 |
| 41 | 21 | 55 | Phil Parsons | Jackson Bros. Motorsports | Oldsmobile | 83 | 0 | crash | 40 | $3,645 |
Official race results

== Standings after the race ==
Drivers' Championship standings

| | Pos | Driver | Points |
|---|---|---|---|
| 1 | 1 | Alan Kulwicki | 767 |
| 1 | 2 | Dale Earnhardt | 749 (-18) |
| 2 | 3 | Geoff Bodine | 730 (-37) |
| | 4 | Sterling Marlin | 728 (–39) |
| 1 | 5 | Rusty Wallace | 701 (–66) |
| 1 | 6 | Rick Wilson | 651 (–116) |
| 4 | 7 | Darrell Waltrip | 637 (–130) |
| 4 | 8 | Davey Allison | 621 (–146) |
| | 9 | Michael Waltrip | 597 (–170) |
| 1 | 10 | Lake Speed | 586 (–181) |
Official driver's standings

- Note: Only the first 10 positions are included for the driver standings.

| Previous race: 1989 Pontiac Excitement 400 | NASCAR Winston Cup Series; 1989 season | Next race: 1989 Valleydale Meats 500 |
