= 1989 Valleydale Meats 500 =

Sixth race of the 1989 NASCAR Winston Cup Series

Race details
- Race 6 of 29 in the 1989 NASCAR Winston Cup Series
- The 1989 Valleydale Meats 500 program cover, featuring Bill Elliott.
- Date: April 9, 1989
- Official name: 29th Annual Valleydale Meats 500
- Location: Bristol, Tennessee, Bristol Motor Speedway
- Course: Permanent racing facility
- Course length: 0.533 miles (0.858 km)
- Distance: 500 laps, 266.5 mi (428.89 km)
- Scheduled distance: 500 laps, 266.5 mi (428.89 km)
- Average speed: 76.034 miles per hour (122.365 km/h)
- Attendance: 56,000

Pole position
| Driver | Mark Martin | Roush Racing |
- Time: 15.953

Most laps led
| Driver | Greg Sacks | Baker–Schiff Racing |
- Laps: 119

Winner
| No. 27 | Rusty Wallace | Blue Max Racing |

Television in the United States
- Network: ESPN
- Announcers: Bob Jenkins, Ned Jarrett, Benny Parsons

Radio in the United States
- Radio: Motor Racing Network

The 1989 Valleydale Meats 500 was the sixth stock car race of the 1989 NASCAR Winston Cup Series season and the 29th iteration of the event. The race was held on Sunday, April 9, 1989, before an audience of 56,000 in Bristol, Tennessee, at Bristol Motor Speedway, a 0.533 miles (0.858 km) permanent oval-shaped racetrack. The race took the scheduled 500 laps to complete. Coming back from initial mishaps early in the race, Blue Max Racing driver Rusty Wallace would manage to make a late race charge to the lead, passing for the lead with 43 laps left in the race to take his 13th career NASCAR Winston Cup Series victory and his third victory of the season. To fill out the top three, Darrell Waltrip and Geoff Bodine, both drivers for Hendrick Motorsports, would finish second and third, respectively.

== Background ==
The layout of Bristol Motor Speedway, the venue where the race was held.

The Bristol Motor Speedway, formerly known as Bristol International Raceway and Bristol Raceway, is a NASCAR short track venue located in Bristol, Tennessee. Constructed in 1960, it held its first NASCAR race on July 30, 1961. Despite its short length, Bristol is among the most popular tracks on the NASCAR schedule because of its distinct features, which include extraordinarily steep banking, an all concrete surface, two pit roads, and stadium-like seating. It has also been named one of the loudest NASCAR tracks.

=== Entry list ===
- (R) denotes rookie driver.

| # | Driver | Team | Make | Sponsor |
|---|---|---|---|---|
| 2 | Ernie Irvan | U.S. Racing | Pontiac | Kroger |
| 3 | Dale Earnhardt | Richard Childress Racing | Chevrolet | GM Goodwrench Service Plus |
| 4 | Rick Wilson | Morgan–McClure Motorsports | Oldsmobile | Kodak |
| 5 | Geoff Bodine | Hendrick Motorsports | Chevrolet | Levi Garrett |
| 6 | Mark Martin | Roush Racing | Ford | Stroh's Light |
| 7 | Alan Kulwicki | AK Racing | Ford | Zerex |
| 8 | Bobby Hillin Jr. | Stavola Brothers Racing | Buick | Miller High Life |
| 9 | Bill Elliott | Melling Racing | Ford | Coors Light |
| 11 | Terry Labonte | Junior Johnson & Associates | Ford | Budweiser |
| 15 | Brett Bodine | Bud Moore Engineering | Ford | Motorcraft |
| 16 | Larry Pearson (R) | Pearson Racing | Buick | Chattanooga Chew |
| 17 | Darrell Waltrip | Hendrick Motorsports | Chevrolet | Tide |
| 21 | Neil Bonnett | Wood Brothers Racing | Ford | Citgo |
| 23 | Eddie Bierschwale | B&B Racing | Oldsmobile | B&B Racing |
| 25 | Ken Schrader | Hendrick Motorsports | Chevrolet | Folgers |
| 26 | Ricky Rudd | King Racing | Buick | Quaker State |
| 27 | Rusty Wallace | Blue Max Racing | Pontiac | Kodiak |
| 28 | Davey Allison | Robert Yates Racing | Ford | Texaco, Havoline |
| 29 | Dale Jarrett | Cale Yarborough Motorsports | Pontiac | Hardee's |
| 30 | Michael Waltrip | Bahari Racing | Pontiac | Country Time |
| 31 | Jim Sauter | Bob Clark Motorsports | Pontiac | Slender You Figure Salons |
| 33 | Harry Gant | Jackson Bros. Motorsports | Oldsmobile | Skoal Bandit |
| 40 | Ben Hess (R) | Hess Racing | Oldsmobile | Hess Racing |
| 43 | Richard Petty | Petty Enterprises | Pontiac | STP |
| 51 | Butch Miller (R) | Miller Racing | Chevrolet | Phoenix Construction |
| 52 | Jimmy Means | Jimmy Means Racing | Pontiac | Alka-Seltzer |
| 55 | Phil Parsons | Jackson Bros. Motorsports | Oldsmobile | Skoal, Crown Central Petroleum |
| 57 | Hut Stricklin (R) | Osterlund Racing | Pontiac | Heinz |
| 66 | Rick Mast (R) | Mach 1 Racing | Chevrolet | Mach 1 Racing |
| 67 | Brad Teague | Arrington Racing | Pontiac | U Can Rent |
| 70 | J. D. McDuffie | McDuffie Racing | Pontiac | Rumple Furniture |
| 71 | Dave Marcis | Marcis Auto Racing | Chevrolet | Lifebuoy |
| 75 | Morgan Shepherd | RahMoc Enterprises | Pontiac | Valvoline |
| 83 | Lake Speed | Speed Racing | Oldsmobile | Bull's-Eye Barbecue Sauce |
| 84 | Dick Trickle (R) | Stavola Brothers Racing | Buick | Miller High Life |
| 88 | Greg Sacks | Baker–Schiff Racing | Pontiac | Crisco |
| 94 | Sterling Marlin | Hagan Racing | Oldsmobile | Sunoco |

== Qualifying ==
Qualifying was originally scheduled to be split into two rounds. The first round was held on Friday, April 7, at 2:00 PM EST. Originally, the first 15 positions were going to be determined by first round qualifying, with positions 16-30 meant to be determined the following day on Saturday, April 8. However, due to rain, the second round was cancelled. As a result, the rest of the starting lineup was set using the results from the first round. Depending on who needed it, a select amount of positions were given to cars who had not otherwise qualified but were high enough in owner's points; up to two were given.

Mark Martin, driving for Roush Racing, would win the pole, setting a time of 15.953 and an average speed of 120.278 miles per hour (193.569 km/h) in the first round.

Five drivers would fail to qualify.

=== Full qualifying results ===
| Pos. | # | Driver | Team | Make | Time | Speed |
|---|---|---|---|---|---|---|
| 1 | 6 | Mark Martin | Roush Racing | Ford | 15.953 | 120.278 |
| 2 | 5 | Geoff Bodine | Hendrick Motorsports | Chevrolet | 16.003 | 119.903 |
| 3 | 7 | Alan Kulwicki | AK Racing | Ford | 16.016 | 119.805 |
| 4 | 4 | Rick Wilson | Morgan–McClure Motorsports | Oldsmobile | 16.126 | 118.988 |
| 5 | 3 | Dale Earnhardt | Richard Childress Racing | Chevrolet | 16.213 | 118.349 |
| 6 | 55 | Phil Parsons | Jackson Bros. Motorsports | Oldsmobile | 16.226 | 118.255 |
| 7 | 30 | Michael Waltrip | Bahari Racing | Pontiac | 16.243 | 118.131 |
| 8 | 27 | Rusty Wallace | Blue Max Racing | Pontiac | 16.251 | 118.073 |
| 9 | 51 | Butch Miller (R) | Miller Racing | Chevrolet | 16.251 | 118.073 |
| 10 | 75 | Morgan Shepherd | RahMoc Enterprises | Pontiac | 16.252 | 118.065 |
| 11 | 33 | Harry Gant | Jackson Bros. Motorsports | Oldsmobile | 16.279 | 117.869 |
| 12 | 23 | Eddie Bierschwale | B&B Racing | Oldsmobile | 16.297 | 117.739 |
| 13 | 17 | Darrell Waltrip | Hendrick Motorsports | Chevrolet | 16.324 | 117.543 |
| 14 | 94 | Sterling Marlin | Hagan Racing | Oldsmobile | 16.326 | 117.530 |
| 15 | 66 | Rick Mast (R) | Mach 1 Racing | Chevrolet | 16.349 | 117.365 |
| 16 | 9 | Bill Elliott | Melling Racing | Ford | 16.361 | 117.279 |
| 17 | 25 | Ken Schrader | Hendrick Motorsports | Chevrolet | 16.366 | 117.243 |
| 18 | 26 | Ricky Rudd | King Racing | Buick | 16.369 | 117.222 |
| 19 | 11 | Terry Labonte | Junior Johnson & Associates | Ford | 16.411 | 116.922 |
| 20 | 29 | Dale Jarrett | Cale Yarborough Motorsports | Pontiac | 16.440 | 116.715 |
| 21 | 88 | Greg Sacks | Baker–Schiff Racing | Pontiac | 16.444 | 116.687 |
| 22 | 8 | Bobby Hillin Jr. | Stavola Brothers Racing | Buick | 16.465 | 116.538 |
| 23 | 31 | Jim Sauter | Bob Clark Motorsports | Pontiac | 16.487 | 116.383 |
| 24 | 15 | Brett Bodine | Bud Moore Engineering | Ford | 16.489 | 116.367 |
| 25 | 2 | Ernie Irvan | U.S. Racing | Pontiac | 16.491 | 116.354 |
| 26 | 57 | Hut Stricklin (R) | Osterlund Racing | Pontiac | 16.540 | 116.010 |
| 27 | 84 | Dick Trickle (R) | Stavola Brothers Racing | Buick | 16.554 | 115.912 |
| 28 | 67 | Brad Teague | Arrington Racing | Pontiac | 16.569 | 115.807 |
| 29 | 21 | Neil Bonnett | Wood Brothers Racing | Ford | 16.622 | 115.437 |
| 30 | 83 | Lake Speed | Speed Racing | Oldsmobile | 16.637 | 115.333 |
Provisionals
| 31 | 28 | Davey Allison | Robert Yates Racing | Ford | -* | -* |
| 32 | 16 | Larry Pearson (R) | Pearson Racing | Buick | -* | -* |
Failed to qualify
| 33 | 43 | Richard Petty | Petty Enterprises | Pontiac | -* | -* |
| 34 | 71 | Dave Marcis | Marcis Auto Racing | Chevrolet | -* | -* |
| 35 | 40 | Ben Hess (R) | Hess Racing | Oldsmobile | -* | -* |
| 36 | 52 | Jimmy Means | Jimmy Means Racing | Pontiac | -* | -* |
| 37 | 70 | J. D. McDuffie | McDuffie Racing | Pontiac | -* | -* |
Official first round qualifying results
Official starting lineup

== Race results ==
| Fin | St | # | Driver | Team | Make | Laps | Led | Status | Pts | Winnings |
|---|---|---|---|---|---|---|---|---|---|---|
| 1 | 8 | 27 | Rusty Wallace | Blue Max Racing | Pontiac | 500 | 51 | running | 180 | $48,750 |
| 2 | 13 | 17 | Darrell Waltrip | Hendrick Motorsports | Chevrolet | 500 | 0 | running | 170 | $28,900 |
| 3 | 2 | 5 | Geoff Bodine | Hendrick Motorsports | Chevrolet | 500 | 43 | running | 170 | $21,950 |
| 4 | 31 | 28 | Davey Allison | Robert Yates Racing | Ford | 500 | 28 | running | 165 | $17,802 |
| 5 | 27 | 84 | Dick Trickle (R) | Stavola Brothers Racing | Buick | 500 | 0 | running | 155 | $12,950 |
| 6 | 1 | 6 | Mark Martin | Roush Racing | Ford | 500 | 37 | running | 155 | $13,975 |
| 7 | 21 | 88 | Greg Sacks | Baker–Schiff Racing | Pontiac | 500 | 119 | running | 156 | $9,300 |
| 8 | 18 | 26 | Ricky Rudd | King Racing | Buick | 500 | 0 | running | 142 | $7,325 |
| 9 | 16 | 9 | Bill Elliott | Melling Racing | Ford | 500 | 34 | running | 143 | $13,150 |
| 10 | 11 | 33 | Harry Gant | Jackson Bros. Motorsports | Oldsmobile | 500 | 22 | running | 139 | $10,350 |
| 11 | 7 | 30 | Michael Waltrip | Bahari Racing | Pontiac | 499 | 0 | running | 130 | $6,500 |
| 12 | 29 | 21 | Neil Bonnett | Wood Brothers Racing | Ford | 499 | 8 | running | 132 | $6,075 |
| 13 | 23 | 31 | Jim Sauter | Bob Clark Motorsports | Pontiac | 498 | 0 | running | 124 | $6,300 |
| 14 | 15 | 66 | Rick Mast (R) | Mach 1 Racing | Chevrolet | 496 | 5 | running | 126 | $5,800 |
| 15 | 14 | 94 | Sterling Marlin | Hagan Racing | Oldsmobile | 493 | 8 | running | 123 | $6,930 |
| 16 | 5 | 3 | Dale Earnhardt | Richard Childress Racing | Chevrolet | 492 | 74 | running | 120 | $21,280 |
| 17 | 28 | 67 | Brad Teague | Arrington Racing | Pontiac | 488 | 0 | running | 112 | $2,480 |
| 18 | 32 | 16 | Larry Pearson (R) | Pearson Racing | Buick | 480 | 0 | oil line | 109 | $2,430 |
| 19 | 12 | 23 | Eddie Bierschwale | B&B Racing | Oldsmobile | 479 | 0 | running | 106 | $2,390 |
| 20 | 3 | 7 | Alan Kulwicki | AK Racing | Ford | 458 | 3 | running | 108 | $6,075 |
| 21 | 4 | 4 | Rick Wilson | Morgan–McClure Motorsports | Oldsmobile | 442 | 2 | running | 105 | $4,710 |
| 22 | 20 | 29 | Dale Jarrett | Cale Yarborough Motorsports | Pontiac | 440 | 0 | running | 97 | $4,520 |
| 23 | 6 | 55 | Phil Parsons | Jackson Bros. Motorsports | Oldsmobile | 420 | 0 | crash | 94 | $4,395 |
| 24 | 19 | 11 | Terry Labonte | Junior Johnson & Associates | Ford | 400 | 0 | running | 91 | $7,825 |
| 25 | 30 | 83 | Lake Speed | Speed Racing | Oldsmobile | 397 | 0 | running | 88 | $4,405 |
| 26 | 10 | 75 | Morgan Shepherd | RahMoc Enterprises | Pontiac | 234 | 4 | crash | 90 | $8,745 |
| 27 | 22 | 8 | Bobby Hillin Jr. | Stavola Brothers Racing | Buick | 215 | 6 | crash | 87 | $4,160 |
| 28 | 26 | 57 | Hut Stricklin (R) | Osterlund Racing | Pontiac | 167 | 0 | crash | 79 | $1,970 |
| 29 | 25 | 2 | Ernie Irvan | U.S. Racing | Pontiac | 167 | 56 | crash | 81 | $2,535 |
| 30 | 24 | 15 | Brett Bodine | Bud Moore Engineering | Ford | 167 | 0 | crash | 73 | $3,450 |
| 31 | 9 | 51 | Butch Miller (R) | Miller Racing | Chevrolet | 80 | 0 | crash | 70 | $1,950 |
| 32 | 17 | 25 | Ken Schrader | Hendrick Motorsports | Chevrolet | 35 | 0 | crash | 67 | $7,650 |
Failed to qualify
| 33 | | 43 | Richard Petty | Petty Enterprises | Pontiac | | | | | |
| 34 | | 71 | Dave Marcis | Marcis Auto Racing | Chevrolet | | | | | |
| 35 | | 40 | Ben Hess (R) | Hess Racing | Oldsmobile | | | | | |
| 36 | | 52 | Jimmy Means | Jimmy Means Racing | Pontiac | | | | | |
| 37 | | 70 | J. D. McDuffie | McDuffie Racing | Pontiac | | | | | |
Official race results

== Standings after the race ==
Drivers' Championship standings

| | Pos | Driver | Points |
|---|---|---|---|
| 2 | 1 | Geoff Bodine | 900 |
| 2 | 2 | Rusty Wallace | 881 (-19) |
| 2 | 3 | Alan Kulwicki | 875 (-25) |
| 2 | 4 | Dale Earnhardt | 869 (–31) |
| 1 | 5 | Sterling Marlin | 851 (–49) |
| 1 | 6 | Darrell Waltrip | 807 (–93) |
| 1 | 7 | Davey Allison | 786 (–114) |
| 2 | 8 | Rick Wilson | 756 (–144) |
| 5 | 9 | Mark Martin | 728 (–172) |
| 1 | 10 | Michael Waltrip | 727 (–173) |
Official driver's standings

- Note: Only the first 10 positions are included for the driver standings.

| Previous race: 1989 TranSouth 500 | NASCAR Winston Cup Series; 1989 season | Next race: 1989 First Union 400 |
