= 1989 NASCAR Winston Cup Series =

American motorsport season

Seasons
- ← 1988 1990 →

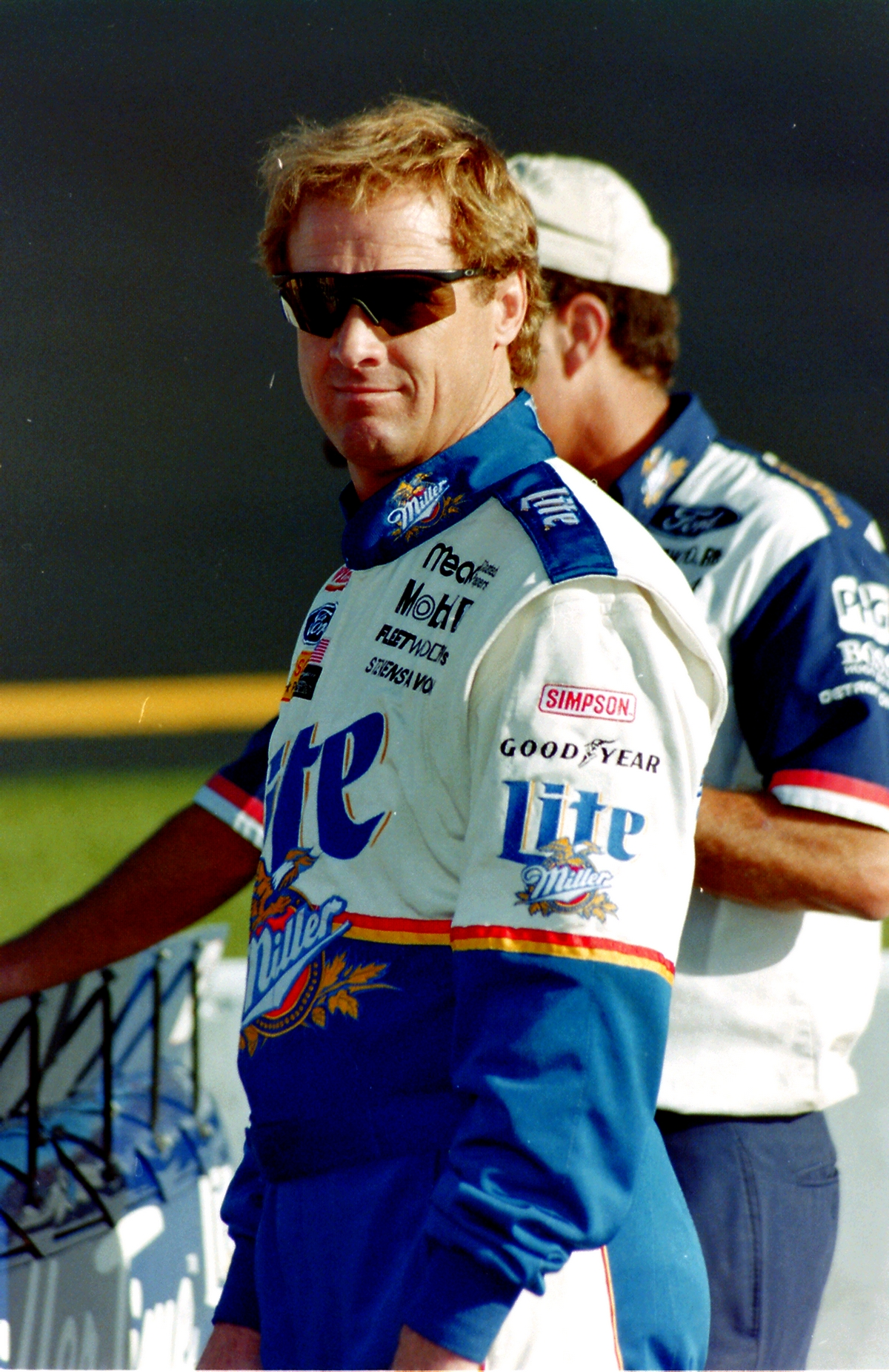
Rusty Wallace won the first and only Winston Cup of his career

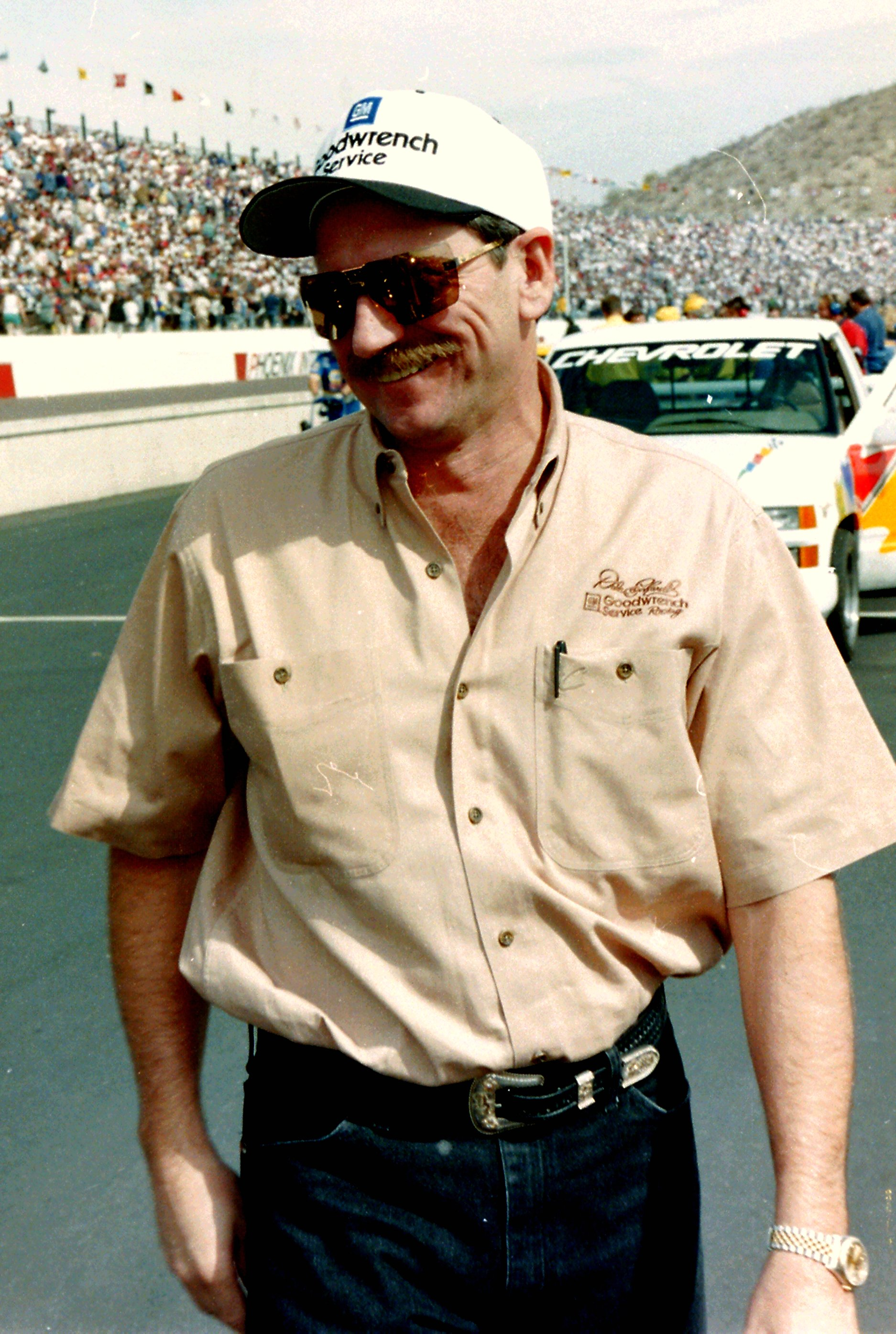
Dale Earnhardt finished second in points

The 1989 NASCAR Winston Cup Series was the 41st season of professional stock car racing in the United States and the 18th modern-era Cup season. It began February 12 and ended November 19. Rusty Wallace of Blue Max Racing won the championship. This was the first year that every Winston Cup race had flag to flag coverage, with almost all of them being televised live.

The 1989 season marked the end of the first of two tire wars between Goodyear and Hoosier, with Hoosier leaving NASCAR shortly after Goodyear debuted their new radial tires.

== 1989 NASCAR Winston Cup Series Drivers ==
=== Complete schedule ===
Manufacturer	Team	No.	Driver	Crew Chief
Buick	David Pearson Racing	16	Larry Pearson (R)	Ricky Pearson
Buick	King Racing	26	Ricky Rudd	Larry McReynolds
Buick	Stavola Brothers Racing	8	Bobby Hillin Jr.	Harry Hyde
Buick	Stavola Brothers Racing	84	Mike Alexander 1	Jimmy Fennig
Buick	Stavola Brothers Racing	84	Dick Trickle (R) 28	Jimmy Fennig
Chevrolet	Hendrick Motorsports	5	Geoff Bodine	Waddell Wilson
Chevrolet	Hendrick Motorsports	17	Darrell Waltrip	Jeff Hammond
Chevrolet	Hendrick Motorsports	25	Ken Schrader	Richard Broome
Chevrolet	Marcis Auto Racing	71	Dave Marcis	
Chevrolet	Richard Childress Racing	3	Dale Earnhardt	Kirk Shelmerdine
Ford	AK Racing	7	Alan Kulwicki	Paul Andrews
Ford	Bud Moore Engineering	15	Brett Bodine	Donnie Wingo
Ford	Junior Johnson & Associates	11	Terry Labonte	Tim Brewer
Ford	Melling Racing	9	Bill Elliott	Ernie Elliott
Ford	Robert Yates Racing	28	Davey Allison	Robert Yates
Ford	Roush Racing	6	Mark Martin	Robin Pemberton
Ford	Wood Brothers Racing	21	Neil Bonnett 26	Leonard Wood
Ford	Wood Brothers Racing	21	Tommy Ellis 3	Leonard Wood
Oldsmobile	Hagan Racing	94	Sterling Marlin	
Oldsmobile	Jackson Brothers Motorsports	33	Harry Gant	Andy Petree
Oldsmobile	Jackson Brothers Motorsports	55	Phil Parsons	
Oldsmobile	Morgan-McClure Motorsports	4	Rick Wilson	Tony Glover
Oldsmobile	Speed Racing	83	Lake Speed 24	
Oldsmobile	Speed Racing	83	Joe Ruttman 3	
Oldsmobile	Speed Racing	83	Eddie Bierschwale 1	
Oldsmobile	Speed Racing	83	Rodney Combs 1	
Pontiac	Bahari Racing	30	Michael Waltrip	Bill Ingle
Pontiac	Baker-Schiff Racing	88	Greg Sacks 10	Dennis Conner
Pontiac	Baker-Schiff Racing	88	Joe Ruttman 1	Dennis Conner
Pontiac	Baker-Schiff Racing	88	Jimmy Spencer (R) 17	Dennis Conner
Pontiac	Blue Max Racing	27	Rusty Wallace	Barry Dodson
Pontiac	Cale Yarborough Motorsports	29	Dale Jarrett	
Pontiac	Means Racing	52	Jimmy Means	
Pontiac	Osterlund Racing	57	Hut Stricklin (R)	Doug Richert
Pontiac	Petty Enterprises	43	Richard Petty	Dale Inman
Pontiac	RahMoc Enterprises	75	Morgan Shepherd	Bob Rahilly
Pontiac	U.S. Racing	2	Ernie Irvan	Bob Johnson

=== Limited schedule ===
Manufacturer	Team	No.	Driver	Crew Chief	Round(s)
Buick	AAG Racing	34	Charlie Glotzbach		1
Buick	AAG Racing	34	Rodney Combs		4
Buick	AAG Racing	34	Jim Bown		1
Chevrolet	Hendrick Motorsports	18	Tommy Kendall	Jake Elder	1
Chevrolet	Hendrick Motorsports	42	Kyle Petty	Gary Nelson	1
Chevrolet	Hendrick Motorsports	46	Greg Sacks		1
Chevrolet	Hendrick Motorsports	51	Bobby Hamilton		1
Chevrolet	Mach 1 Racing	66	Rick Mast (R)	Travis Carter	14
Chevrolet	Miller Racing	1	Butch Miller		1
Chevrolet	Miller Racing	51	Butch Miller		9
Ford	Dick Johnson Racing	38	Dick Johnson	Ray Evernham	5
Ford	Donlavey Racing	90	Chad Little		8
Ford	Donlavey Racing	90	Stan Barrett		4
Ford	Donlavey Racing	90	Lennie Pond		1
Ford	Donlavey Racing	90	Tracy Leslie		1
Ford	Gibbs Racing	01	Mickey Gibbs		2
Oldsmobile	A.J. Foyt Enterprises	14	A.J. Foyt		8
Oldsmobile	A.J. Foyt Enterprises	14	Tracy Leslie		2
Oldsmobile	Aroneck Racing	53	Jerry O'Neil		7
Oldsmobile	Barkdoll Racing	73	Phil Barkdoll	Cliff Champion	5
Oldsmobile	B&B Racing	23	Eddie Bierschwale		16
Oldsmobile	Hess Racing	40	Ben Hess (R)	Doug Richert	10
Pontiac	Arrington Racing	67	Mickey Gibbs	Buddy Arrington	1
Pontiac	Arrington Racing	67	Brad Teague	Buddy Arrington	1
Pontiac	Bob Clark Motorsports	31	Jim Sauter		10
Pontiac	Dingman Brothers Racing	50	Jim Sauter		1
Pontiac	Dingman Brothers Racing	50	Mickey Gibbs		2
Pontiac	Group 44	44	Jim Sauter	Lee Arter	9
Pontiac	McDuffie Racing	70	J.D. McDuffie	Jeff McDuffie	23
Pontiac	Mueller Brothers Racing	89	Rodney Combs		8
Pontiac	SABCO Racing	42	Kyle Petty	Gary Nelson	20
Pontiac	Whitcomb Racing	10	Ken Bouchard	Buddy Parrott	5
Pontiac	Whitcomb Racing	10	Derrike Cope	Buddy Parrott	20
Pontiac	Winkle Motorsports	48	Mickey Gibbs		4
Pontiac	Winkle Motorsports	48	Greg Sacks		10

== Schedule ==
No.	Race title	Track	Date
	Busch Clash	Daytona International Speedway, Daytona Beach	February 12
	Twin 125 Qualifiers	Daytona International Speedway, Daytona Beach	February 16
1	Daytona 500	Daytona International Speedway, Daytona Beach	February 19
2	Goodwrench 500	North Carolina Motor Speedway, Rockingham	March 5
3	Motorcraft Quality Parts 500	Atlanta International Raceway, Hampton	March 19
4	Pontiac Excitement 400	Richmond International Raceway, Richmond	March 26
5	TranSouth 500	Darlington Raceway, Darlington	April 2
6	Valleydale Meats 500	Bristol International Raceway, Bristol	April 9
7	First Union 400	North Wilkesboro Speedway, North Wilkesboro	April 16
8	Pannill Sweatshirts 500	Martinsville Speedway, Ridgeway	April 23
9	Winston 500	Talladega Superspeedway, Talladega	May 7
	Winston Open	Charlotte Motor Speedway, Concord	May 21
	The Winston	Charlotte Motor Speedway, Concord	May 21
10	Coca-Cola 600	Charlotte Motor Speedway, Concord	May 28
11	Budweiser 500	Dover Downs International Speedway, Dover	June 4
12	Banquet Frozen Foods 300	Sears Point Raceway, Sonoma	June 11
13	Miller High Life 500	Pocono International Raceway, Long Pond	June 18
14	Miller High Life 400	Michigan International Speedway, Brooklyn	June 25
15	Pepsi 400	Daytona International Speedway, Daytona Beach	July 1
16	AC Spark Plug 500	Pocono International Raceway, Long Pond	July 23
17	Talladega DieHard 500	Talladega Superspeedway, Talladega	July 30
18	Budweiser at The Glen	Watkins Glen International, Watkins Glen	August 13
19	Champion Spark Plug 400	Michigan International Speedway, Brooklyn	August 20
20	Busch 500	Bristol International Raceway, Bristol	August 26
21	Heinz Southern 500	Darlington Raceway, Darlington	September 3
22	Miller High Life 400	Richmond International Raceway, Richmond	September 10
23	Peak Performance 500	Dover Downs International Speedway, Dover	September 17
24	Goody's 500	Martinsville Speedway, Ridgeway	September 24
25	All Pro Auto Parts 500	Charlotte Motor Speedway, Concord	October 8
26	Holly Farms 400	North Wilkesboro Speedway, North Wilkesboro	October 15
27	AC Delco 500	North Carolina Motor Speedway, Rockingham	October 22
28	Autoworks 500	Phoenix International Raceway, Phoenix	November 5
29	Atlanta Journal 500	Atlanta International Raceway, Hampton	November 19

== Races ==
No.	Race	Pole position	Most laps led	Winning driver	Manufacturer
	Busch Clash	Ken Schrader	Ken Schrader	Ken Schrader	Chevrolet
	Twin 125 #1	Ken Schrader	Ken Schrader	Ken Schrader	Chevrolet
	Twin 125 #2	Darrell Waltrip	Dale Earnhardt	Terry Labonte	Ford
1	Daytona 500	Ken Schrader	Ken Schrader	Darrell Waltrip	Chevrolet
2	Goodwrench 500	Rusty Wallace	Rusty Wallace	Rusty Wallace	Pontiac
3	Motorcraft Quality Parts 500	Alan Kulwicki	Rusty Wallace	Darrell Waltrip	Chevrolet
4	Pontiac Excitement 400	Geoff Bodine	Geoff Bodine	Rusty Wallace	Pontiac
5	TranSouth 500	Mark Martin	Harry Gant	Harry Gant	Oldsmobile
6	Valleydale Meats 500	Mark Martin	Greg Sacks	Rusty Wallace	Pontiac
7	First Union 400	Rusty Wallace	Dale Earnhardt	Dale Earnhardt	Chevrolet
8	Pannill Sweatshirts 500	Geoff Bodine	Darrell Waltrip	Darrell Waltrip	Chevrolet
9	Winston 500	Mark Martin	Davey Allison	Davey Allison	Ford
	Winston Open	Mark Martin	Sterling Marlin	Sterling Marlin	Oldsmobile
	The Winston	Terry Labonte	Rusty Wallace	Rusty Wallace	Pontiac
10	Coca-Cola 600	Alan Kulwicki	Alan Kulwicki	Darrell Waltrip	Chevrolet
11	Budweiser 500	Mark Martin	Dale Earnhardt	Dale Earnhardt	Chevrolet
12	Banquet Frozen Foods 300	Rusty Wallace	Ricky Rudd	Ricky Rudd	Buick
13	Miller High Life 500	Rusty Wallace	Rusty Wallace	Terry Labonte	Ford
14	Miller High Life 400	Ken Schrader	Rusty Wallace	Bill Elliott	Ford
15	Pepsi 400	Mark Martin	Bill Elliott	Davey Allison	Ford
16	AC Spark Plug 500	Ken Schrader	Rusty Wallace	Bill Elliott	Ford
17	Talladega DieHard 500	Mark Martin	Morgan Shepherd	Terry Labonte	Ford
18	Budweiser at The Glen	Morgan Shepherd	Morgan Shepherd	Rusty Wallace	Pontiac
19	Champion Spark Plug 400	Geoff Bodine	Rusty Wallace	Rusty Wallace	Pontiac
20	Busch 500	Alan Kulwicki	Darrell Waltrip	Darrell Waltrip	Chevrolet
21	Heinz Southern 500	Alan Kulwicki	Dale Earnhardt	Dale Earnhardt	Chevrolet
22	Miller High Life 400	Bill Elliott	Rusty Wallace	Rusty Wallace	Pontiac
23	Peak Performance 500	Davey Allison	Dale Earnhardt	Dale Earnhardt	Chevrolet
24	Goody's 500	Dale Earnhardt	Rusty Wallace	Darrell Waltrip	Chevrolet
25	All Pro Auto Parts 500	Bill Elliott	Bill Elliott	Ken Schrader	Chevrolet
26	Holly Farms 400	Dale Earnhardt	Dale Earnhardt	Geoff Bodine	Chevrolet
27	AC Delco 500	Alan Kulwicki	Rusty Wallace	Mark Martin	Ford
28	Autoworks 500	Ken Schrader	Alan Kulwicki	Bill Elliott	Ford
29	Atlanta Journal 500	Alan Kulwicki	Dale Earnhardt	Dale Earnhardt	Chevrolet

=== Busch Clash ===
The Busch Clash, an annual invitational event for all winners of the Busch Pole award from the previous season, was held February 12 at Daytona International Speedway. Ken Schrader drew for the pole.

Top Ten Results

1. 25-Ken Schrader
2. 28-Davey Allison
3. 11-Terry Labonte
4. 5-Geoff Bodine
5. 4-Rick Wilson
6. 27-Rusty Wallace
7. 6-Mark Martin
8. 17-Darrell Waltrip
9. 75-Morgan Shepherd
10. 66-Rick Mast

=== Gatorade 125s ===
The Gatorade 125s, a pair of qualifying races for the Daytona 500, were held February 16 at Daytona International Speedway. Ken Schrader and Darrell Waltrip won the poles for each event, respectively.

Race One Top Ten Results

1. 25-Ken Schrader
2. 75-Morgan Shepherd
3. 6-Mark Martin
4. 55-Phil Parsons
5. 7-Alan Kulwicki
6. 66-Rick Mast
7. 9-Jody Ridley
8. 10-Ken Bouchard -1
9. 45-Joe Ruttman -1
10. 71-Dave Marcis -1

Race Two Top Ten Results

1. 11-Terry Labonte
2. 94-Sterling Marlin
3. 3-Dale Earnhardt
4. 5-Geoff Bodine
5. 33-Harry Gant
6. 16-Larry Pearson
7. 28-Davey Allison
8. 17-Darrell Waltrip -1
9. 15-Brett Bodine -1
10. 29-Dale Jarrett -1
- Jody Ridley substituted for Bill Elliott, who injured his wrist in a practice crash.

=== Daytona 500 ===
The Daytona 500 was held February 19. Ken Schrader won the pole.

Top Ten Results

1. 17-Darrell Waltrip
2. 25-Ken Schrader
3. 3-Dale Earnhardt
4. 5-Geoff Bodine
5. 55-Phil Parsons
6. 66-Rick Mast*
7. 7-Alan Kulwicki
8. 4-Rick Wilson
9. 11-Terry Labonte
10. 23-Eddie Bierschwale
- Darrell Waltrip stretched his fuel for 53 laps, and won the Daytona 500 for the first time after 17 attempts.

=== Goodwrench 500 ===
The Goodwrench 500 was held March 5 at North Carolina Motor Speedway. Rusty Wallace won the pole.

Top Ten Results

1. 27-Rusty Wallace
2. 7-Alan Kulwicki
3. 3-Dale Earnhardt
4. 5-Geoff Bodine
5. 6-Mark Martin
6. 28-Davey Allison
7. 94-Sterling Marlin
8. 83-Lake Speed
9. 88-Greg Sacks
10. 31-Jim Sauter
- Rusty Wallace became the first driver to claim the Unocal 76 Challenge. After one rollover, and bonus money added at the season ending banquet, Wallace received an additional $22,800 for winning from the pole.

=== Motorcraft Quality Parts 500 ===
The Motorcraft Quality Parts 500 was held March 19 at Atlanta International Raceway. Alan Kulwicki won the pole.

Top Ten Results

1. 17-Darrell Waltrip
2. 3-Dale Earnhardt
3. 84-Dick Trickle
4. 42-Kyle Petty
5. 94-Sterling Marlin
6. 4-Rick Wilson
7. 21-Neil Bonnett
8. 57-Hut Stricklin
9. 29-Dale Jarrett
10. 75-Morgan Shepherd

Failed to qualify: #36-H. B. Baily, #69-Lee Raymond, #70-J. D. McDuffie, Rodney Combs, Rick Jeffrey

- Richard Petty was a factor among the leaders, and led 9 laps. But during a pit stop, the gas can leaked fuel onto the exhaust pipe, and started a bad pit fire. Crew member Robert Callicutt suffered second degree burns over 40% of his body and was hospitalized. Petty was forced to drop out of the race. The incident led to new rules regarding crew member fire protection, and newly designed gas can nozzles to prevent leakage. In addition, all pit road reporters for ABC and ESPN would be required to wear fire protected suits for future races telecast by either network.

=== Pontiac Excitement 400 ===
The Pontiac Excitement 400 was held March 26 at Richmond International Raceway. Geoff Bodine won the pole.

Top Ten Results

1. 27-Rusty Wallace
2. 7-Alan Kulwicki
3. 3-Dale Earnhardt
4. 26-Ricky Rudd
5. 28-Davey Allison
6. 16-Larry Pearson
7. 17-Darrell Waltrip
8. 94-Sterling Marlin
9. 2-Ernie Irvan
10. 9-Bill Elliott

Failed to qualify: 43-Richard Petty

- This race was scheduled for the weekend after the Daytona 500 (February 26), but snow fell in Richmond and blanketed the Speedway. The race was postponed a month, and in subsequent seasons, the spring Richmond race was moved later and later into the season. It is one of the rare times a NASCAR race has been held on Easter Sunday, a weekend that has not had an originally scheduled NASCAR Cup race in the modern era.
- After qualifying for 513 consecutive races, Richard Petty failed to make the field for this race for the first time since the 1971 Georgia 500. He wrecked his primary car during practice, and could not get the backup car up to speed. His consecutive starts record would stand until the 1996 First Union 400 when Terry Labonte broke the record. Petty's failure to qualify would not be this isolated race however as he would fail to qualify for three additional races later in the season. This would eventually lead to the past champion's provisional being added for former Cup champions failing to qualify on speed or normal provisionals.

=== TranSouth 500 ===
The TranSouth 500 was held April 2 at Darlington Raceway. Mark Martin won the pole.

Top Ten Results

1. 33-Harry Gant
2. 28-Davey Allison
3. 5-Geoff Bodine
4. 6-Mark Martin
5. 94-Sterling Marlin
6. 9-Bill Elliott
7. 7-Alan Kulwicki
8. 27-Rusty Wallace
9. 30-Michael Waltrip
10. 83-Lake Speed
- This was Harry Gant's first victory since the 1985 Holly Farms 400.

=== Valleydale Meats 500 ===
The Valleydale Meats 500 was held April 9 at Bristol International Raceway. Mark Martin won the pole.

Top Ten Results

1. 27-Rusty Wallace
2. 17-Darrell Waltrip
3. 5-Geoff Bodine
4. 28-Davey Allison
5. 84-Dick Trickle
6. 6-Mark Martin
7. 88-Greg Sacks
8. 26-Ricky Rudd
9. 9-Bill Elliott
10. 33-Harry Gant

Failed to qualify: #40-Ben Hess, #43-Richard Petty, #52-Jimmy Means, #70-J. D. McDuffie, #71-Dave Marcis, Steve Seligman

- This would be Greg Sacks' best finish of 1989.
- This was the final NASCAR start for team owner Buddy Arrington with Brad Teague as his final driver. Teague would finish 17th, 12 laps down to the winner.
- This race would set the all time caution record for the NASCAR Cup Series; this record would hold up for seventeen years before being beaten by the 2005 Coca-Cola 600.

=== First Union 400 ===
The First Union 400 was held April 16 at North Wilkesboro Speedway. Rusty Wallace won the pole.

Top Ten Results

1. 3-Dale Earnhardt
2. 7-Alan Kulwicki
3. 6-Mark Martin
4. 84-Dick Trickle
5. 11-Terry Labonte
6. 26-Ricky Rudd
7. 5-Geoff Bodine
8. 17-Darrell Waltrip
9. 27-Rusty Wallace
10. 2-Ernie Irvan

Failed to qualify: 8-Bobby Hillin Jr., 43-Richard Petty, 55-Phil Parsons*, 70-J. D. McDuffie, 04-Bill Meacham, Jerry O'Neil, Kevin Evans, Mark Walbridge

- The race was notable for Goodyear debuting their new radial tires and Dale Earnhardt winning the race with them.
- Phil Parsons' team purchased the No. 60 in this event in order to race. He finished 12th, 6 laps down.

=== Pannill Sweatshirts 500 ===
The Pannill Sweatshirts 500 was held April 23 at Martinsville Speedway. Geoff Bodine won the pole.

Top Ten Results

1. 17-Darrell Waltrip
2. 3-Dale Earnhardt
3. 84-Dick Trickle
4. 4-Rick Wilson
5. 11-Terry Labonte
6. 6-Mark Martin
7. 25-Ken Schrader
8. 94-Sterling Marlin
9. 71-Dave Marcis
10. 21-Neil Bonnett

• This would mark the final race as well as race victory for the older Chevrolet Monte Carlo body style. The new Chevrolet Lumina would debut the next week at Talladega Superspeedway.

=== Winston 500 ===
The Winston 500 was held May 7 at Alabama International Motor Speedway. Mark Martin won the pole.

Top Ten Results

1. 28-Davey Allison
2. 11-Terry Labonte
3. 6-Mark Martin
4. 75-Morgan Shepherd
5. 17-Darrell Waltrip
6. 25-Ken Schrader
7. 33-Harry Gant
8. 3-Dale Earnhardt
9. 21-Neil Bonnett
10. 27-Rusty Wallace
- This was the first race for the new Chevrolet Lumina race car.
- This race marked the end of the first tire war, as Hoosier Racing Tire left NASCAR when they could not sell enough tires to be economically viable. Hoosier returned to the Winston Cup Series in 1994, but left for good after that season.
- This was Robert Yates Racing's first race victory.
- Derrike Cope brings his Purolator sponsorship to the Bob Whitcomb team as their new driver. He was involved in the race's final caution in The Big One crashing out of the race, finishing 30th.

=== The Winston ===
The Winston, an annual all-star race for previous winners and champions along with the winner of the same day Winston Open, was held May 21 at Charlotte Motor Speedway.Terry Labonte won the pole.

Top Ten Results

1. 27-Rusty Wallace
2. 25-Ken Schrader
3. 3-Dale Earnhardt
4. 9-Bill Elliott
5. 7-Alan Kulwicki
6. 94-Sterling Marlin (Winston Open Winner)
7. 17-Darrell Waltrip
8. 26-Ricky Rudd
9. 5-Geoff Bodine
10. 88-Greg Sacks
- Rusty Wallace spun Darrell Waltrip out of the lead coming to the white flag to earn the victory. This sparked a fight between Wallace and Waltrip's crew members in the pits before Wallace got to victory lane.

=== Coca-Cola 600 ===
The Coca-Cola 600 was held May 28 at Charlotte Motor Speedway. Alan Kulwicki won the pole.

Top Ten Results

1. 17-Darrell Waltrip
2. 94-Sterling Marlin
3. 25-Ken Schrader
4. 5-Geoff Bodine
5. 9-Bill Elliott
6. 6-Mark Martin
7. 21-Neil Bonnett
8. 15-Brett Bodine
9. 8-Bobby Hillin Jr.
10. 26-Ricky Rudd
- By winning the Daytona 500 earlier in the season, and now the Coca-Cola 600, Waltrip secured a $100,000 bonus for winning two of the Winston Million races, and put himself in position to win the Winston Million later in the season at Darlington.
- Kyle Petty drives the number 42 Peak Antifreeze Chevrolet Monte Carlo owned by Rick Hendrick in this race due to Kyle destroying the only car his regular owner Felix Sabates had during the previous weekend on lap 3 of The Winston. He would finish 17th, 8 laps down to the winner.
- Darrell Waltrip, who won the final race with the older Chevrolet Monte Carlo body style at Martinsville a month earlier, became the first driver to take the Lumina that replaced it to Victory Lane.
- This would be the final race for the Slender You Figure Salons team owned by Bob Clark; with Jim Sauter finishing the race in 37th place.

=== Budweiser 500 ===
The Budweiser 500 was held June 4 at Dover Downs International Speedway. Mark Martin won the pole.

Top Ten Results

1. 3-Dale Earnhardt
2. 6-Mark Martin
3. 25-Ken Schrader
4. 11-Terry Labonte
5. 27-Rusty Wallace
6. 26-Ricky Rudd
7. 21-Neil Bonnett
8. 9-Bill Elliott
9. 17-Darrell Waltrip
10. 55-Phil Parsons
- This race marked the debut of Jimmy Spencer in the NASCAR Cup Series driving Buddy Baker's number 88. However it was short lived as he would finish 34th only completing 75 laps due to engine failure.

=== Banquet Frozen Foods 300 ===
The inaugural Banquet Frozen Foods 300 was held June 11 at Sears Point Raceway. Rusty Wallace won the pole.

Top Ten Results

1. 26-Ricky Rudd
2. 27-Rusty Wallace
3. 9-Bill Elliott
4. 3-Dale Earnhardt
5. 83-Lake Speed
6. 88-Joe Ruttman
7. 75-Morgan Shepherd
8. 4-Rick Wilson
9. 28-Davey Allison
10. 30-Michael Waltrip
- Mark Martin actually rolled his car during the race due to an error by a new tire changer (only two of the five lug nuts were properly fastened on the car). Right after the car left the pits, the right rear came off, the car spun, hit the tire barrier and rolled onto its roof. However, he came back to finish the race in 31st, 5 laps down.
- This would be Buick's penultimate victory in the NASCAR Cup Series.

=== Miller High Life 500 ===
The Miller High Life 500 was held June 18 at Pocono International Raceway. Rusty Wallace won the pole. This race was one of the few races telecast on pay-per-view.

Top Ten Results

1. 11-Terry Labonte
2. 33-Harry Gant
3. 3-Dale Earnhardt
4. 25-Ken Schrader
5. 75-Morgan Shepherd
6. 94-Sterling Marlin
7. 29-Dale Jarrett
8. 21-Neil Bonnett
9. 16-Larry Pearson
10. 15-Brett Bodine
- This was the first victory for Junior Johnson's team using a Ford since the 1969 American 500 at Rockingham.

=== Miller High Life 400 (Michigan) ===
The Miller High Life 400 was held June 25 at Michigan International Speedway. Ken Schrader won the pole.

Top Ten Results

1. 9-Bill Elliott
2. 27-Rusty Wallace
3. 17-Darrell Waltrip
4. 26-Ricky Rudd
5. 15-Brett Bodine
6. 4-Rick Wilson
7. 83-Lake Speed
8. 94-Sterling Marlin
9. 10-Derrike Cope
10. 42-Kyle Petty

=== Pepsi 400 ===
The Pepsi 400 was held July 1 at Daytona International Speedway. Mark Martin won the pole.

Top Ten Results

1. 28-Davey Allison
2. 75-Morgan Shepherd
3. 55-Phil Parsons
4. 9-Bill Elliott
5. 7-Alan Kulwicki
6. 11-Terry Labonte
7. 94-Sterling Marlin
8. 84-Dick Trickle
9. 26-Ricky Rudd
10. 57-Hut Stricklin
- This was first time the Pepsi 400 was aired on ESPN. The race was shown flag-to-flag, but on same-day tape delay. Previously, the Pepsi/Firecracker 400 was aired as part of ABC's Wide World of Sports and only highlights of the race would air.
- This race featured a rollover crash involving Lake Speed on lap 144.

=== AC Spark Plug 500 ===
The AC Spark Plug 500 was held on July 23 at Pocono International Raceway. Ken Schrader won the pole.

Top Ten Finishers

1. 9-Bill Elliott
2. 27-Rusty Wallace
3. 6-Mark Martin
4. 17-Darrell Waltrip
5. 28-Davey Allison
6. 33-Harry Gant
7. 25-Ken Schrader
8. 75-Morgan Shepherd
9. 3-Dale Earnhardt
10. 15-Brett Bodine
- This race was notable for two wrecks that tore open portions of the track's boilerplate walls. Jimmy Horton crashed in Turn Two and tore open a hole in the wall. Later a big wreck erupted in Turn One involving Greg Sacks in the Tom Winkle No. 48 and the No. 83 of Lake Speed. The two cars got together going into Turn One and smashed into the boilerplate wall head-on. The hit punched open the wall and sent Sacks flipping. The yellow remained out for the duration of time needed to repair the wall. Speed broke his shoulder in the crash and had to sit out for a couple weeks.
- Elliott cut a tire on the opening lap but rallied to take the lead from Wallace in the final ten laps. The win tied Elliott with Tim Richmond for most wins at Pocono. Richmond, battling illness, was the subject of a short retrospective piece on the ESPN telecast and former Richmond crew chiefs Barry Dodson and Harry Hyde were interviewed on-air about him.

=== Talladega DieHard 500 ===
The Talladega DieHard 500 was held July 30 at Alabama International Motor Speedway. Mark Martin won the pole.

Top Ten Results

1. 11-Terry Labonte
2. 17-Darrell Waltrip
3. 6-Mark Martin
4. 25-Ken Schrader
5. 4-Rick Wilson
6. 75-Morgan Shepherd
7. 42-Kyle Petty
8. 33-Harry Gant
9. 28-Davey Allison
10. 21-Neil Bonnett
- Joe Ruttman substituted for Lake Speed in the No. 83, and crashed spectacularly on lap 145. Ruttman hit the wall nearly head-on and almost got on his side as a result.
- This would be Labontes final win with the Junior Johnson team. Labonte would not win again in the Cup series until 1994.

=== Budweiser at the Glen ===
The Budweiser at the Glen was held August 13 at Watkins Glen International. Morgan Shepherd won the pole.

Top Ten Results

1. 27-Rusty Wallace
2. 6-Mark Martin
3. 3-Dale Earnhardt
4. 28-Davey Allison
5. 8-Bobby Hillin Jr.
6. 75-Morgan Shepherd
7. 94-Sterling Marlin
8. 4-Rick Wilson
9. 44-Jim Sauter
10. 30-Michael Waltrip
- Eddie Bierschwale was the substitute driver in the No. 83 for Lake Speed, who was still recovering from his shoulder injury at Pocono. He finished 38th.
- This race is notable for a big wreck on lap 89 involving the No. 5 of Geoff Bodine. Bodine lost a tire at the end of the backstraight, spun around and went through the barrier and hitting a fence behind the barrier (more or less marking off the property line of Watkins Glen International's land). Bodine was uninjured.
- Also on this day, Tim Richmond who had a long battle with AIDS, died earlier in the day.
- Wallace's victory snapped a five-race winning streak for Ford.
- Late in the race, ESPN showed Tom Cruise meeting with Rick Hendrick and members of that team as part of his preparation to play Cole Trickle in the 1990 film Days of Thunder.
- This race would be Jim Sauter's final Top 10 finish, with Sauter's 9th place finish tying his finish at the 1987 Coca-Cola 600 for the best of his career.

=== Champion Spark Plug 400 ===
The Champion Spark Plug 400 was held August 20 at Michigan International Speedway. Geoff Bodine won the pole.

Top Ten Results

1. 27-Rusty Wallace
2. 75-Morgan Shepherd
3. 33-Harry Gant
4. 57-Hut Stricklin
5. 5-Geoff Bodine
6. 10-Derrike Cope
7. 28-Davey Allison
8. 26-Ricky Rudd
9. 6-Mark Martin
10. 7-Alan Kulwicki

=== Busch 500 ===
The Busch 500 was held August 26 at Bristol International Raceway. Alan Kulwicki won the pole.

Top Ten Results

1. 17-Darrell Waltrip
2. 7-Alan Kulwicki
3. 26-Ricky Rudd
4. 33-Harry Gant
5. 11-Terry Labonte
6. 27-Rusty Wallace
7. 8-Bobby Hillin Jr.
8. 88-Jimmy Spencer
9. 21-Neil Bonnett
10. 29-Dale Jarrett

Failed to qualify: 43-Richard Petty

- This was the fourth race that Petty failed to qualify. In response to fan complaints about Petty missing several races, NASCAR introduced the past champion's provisional in 1991.
- Fortunately, this would be the last DNQ for Richard Petty before his retirement in 1992.

=== Heinz Southern 500 ===
The Heinz Southern 500 was held September 3 at Darlington Raceway. Alan Kulwicki won the pole.

Top Ten Results

1. 3-Dale Earnhardt
2. 6-Mark Martin
3. 26-Ricky Rudd
4. 27-Rusty Wallace
5. 25-Ken Schrader
6. 33-Harry Gant
7. 9-Bill Elliott
8. 8-Bobby Hillin Jr.
9. 75-Morgan Shepherd
10. 94-Sterling Marlin
- Darrell Waltrip had a chance to win the Winston Million at Darlington, but hit the wall early in the race and finished 22nd.
- Rodney Combs replaced Joe Ruttman as Lake Speed's substitute driver in the No. 83 at Darlington. He finished 23rd.

=== Miller High Life 400 (Richmond) ===
The Miller High Life 400 was held September 10 at Richmond International Raceway. 9 of Bill Elliott won the pole.

Top Ten Results

1. 27-Rusty Wallace
2. 3-Dale Earnhardt
3. 5-Geoff Bodine
4. 26-Ricky Rudd
5. 33-Harry Gant
6. 17-Darrell Waltrip
7. 21-Neil Bonnett
8. 84-Dick Trickle
9. 57-Hut Stricklin
10. 28-Davey Allison
- Lake Speed returned to the No. 83 at Richmond after sitting out 5 races due to injury.
- Lennie Pond retired after this race.

=== Peak Performance 500 ===
The Peak Performance 500 was held September 17 at Dover Downs International Speedway. Davey Allison won the pole.

Top Ten Results

1. 3-Dale Earnhardt
2. 6-Mark Martin
3. 25-Ken Schrader
4. 9-Bill Elliott
5. 26-Ricky Rudd
6. 30-Michael Waltrip
7. 27-Rusty Wallace
8. 10-Derrike Cope
9. 15-Brett Bodine
10. 88-Jimmy Spencer
- The race was red-flagged briefly because of a crash involving Neil Bonnett. Bonnett, who broke his sternum in the incident, was forced to sit out the next three races. The reason for the delay was to clear the track to allow for an ambulance to transport Bonnett out of the speedway to a local hospital.

=== Goody's 500 ===
The Goody's 500 was held September 24 at Martinsville Speedway. Dale Earnhardt started on the pole, which was actually won by Jimmy Hensley (as a substitute driver) as Earnhardt and others could not reach the track in time due to Hurricane Hugo, which affected the area.

Top Ten Results

1. 17-Darrell Waltrip
2. 33-Harry Gant
3. 84-Dick Trickle
4. 27-Rusty Wallace
5. 29-Dale Jarrett
6. 2-Ernie Irvan
7. 15-Brett Bodine
8. 26-Ricky Rudd
9. 3-Dale Earnhardt
10. 25-Ken Schrader
- Tommy Ellis substituted for Neil Bonnett in the No. 21 in this race, and the next 2 events in Charlotte and North Wilkesboro.
- This would be Darrell Waltrip's last Cup Series win with Hendrick Motorsports

=== All Pro Auto Parts 500 ===
The All Pro Auto Parts 500 was held October 8 at Charlotte Motor Speedway. Bill Elliott won the pole.

Top Ten Results

1. 25-Ken Schrader
2. 33-Harry Gant
3. 6-Mark Martin
4. 9-Bill Elliott
5. 28-Davey Allison
6. 10-Derrike Cope
7. 94-Sterling Marlin
8. 27-Rusty Wallace -1
9. 8-Bobby Hillin Jr. -2
10. 75-Morgan Shepherd -2

Failed to qualify: 14-A. J. Foyt*

- Foyt was involved in a practice crash where he suffered a significant concussion which kept him from attempting to qualify.
- Dale Earnhardt lost the points lead in this race when the camshaft in his No. 3 Chevrolet broke in the 13th lap, and he dropped out.

=== Holly Farms 400 ===
The Holly Farms 400 at North Wilkesboro Speedway was originally scheduled for October 1, but rain forced the race to be postponed to October 15. Rain also cancelled qualifying so Dale Earnhardt who was leading the points at the time qualifying was cancelled on September 30 was awarded the pole per the current owners points at that time.

Top Ten Results

1. 5-Geoff Bodine
2. 6-Mark Martin
3. 11-Terry Labonte
4. 33-Harry Gant
5. 75-Morgan Shepherd
6. 9-Bill Elliott
7. 27-Rusty Wallace
8. 2-Ernie Irvan
9. 26-Ricky Rudd
10. 3-Dale Earnhardt
- This race was notable for the race for the win between Earnhardt and Ricky Rudd. On the last lap, Earnhardt and Rudd touched in turn 1, spinning both cars out. This allowed Geoff Bodine to slip by and win the race, and allowed Rusty Wallace to gain points on Earnhardt for the championship hunt.
- This was Bodine's first win since the 1988 Miller High Life 500 at Pocono. Bodine led only the final lap of the race while Dale Earnhardt dominated, leading 343 of the 400 laps. This was also Geoff Bodine's final win in a Chevrolet and with Hendrick Motorsports. Geoff would leave the No. 5 Chevrolet Lumina to go drive the No. 11 Ford Thunderbird for the next 2 years (1990-1991) with Junior Johnson & Associates.
- A rare father-and-son crash knocked both Richard Petty and son Kyle out of the race, with Richard finishing 32nd (last); the 15th and final last-place finish for "the King". Kyle ended the afternoon in 31st place.

=== AC Delco 500 ===
The AC Delco 500 was held October 22 at North Carolina Motor Speedway. Alan Kulwicki won the pole.

Top Ten Results

1. 6-Mark Martin*
2. 27-Rusty Wallace
3. 17-Darrell Waltrip
4. 25-Ken Schrader
5. 84-Dick Trickle
6. 21-Neil Bonnett*
7. 5-Geoff Bodine
8. 8-Bobby Hillin Jr.
9. 7-Alan Kulwicki
10. 42-Kyle Petty
- This was Martin's first career Winston Cup victory.
- This was Bonnett's first race back from his sternum injury that he suffered at Dover.

=== Autoworks 500 ===
The Autoworks 500 was held November 5 at Phoenix International Raceway. Ken Schrader won the pole.

Top Ten Results

1. 9-Bill Elliott
2. 11-Terry Labonte
3. 6-Mark Martin
4. 17-Darrell Waltrip
5. 29-Dale Jarrett
6. 3-Dale Earnhardt
7. 84-Dick Trickle
8. 33-Harry Gant
9. 30-Michael Waltrip
10. 88-Jimmy Spencer

Failed to qualify: 18-Tommy Ellis, 41-Danny Lawson, 89-Bob Howard, 35-Keith van Houten, 07-Mark Walbridge, 44-Jack Sellers, 19-Robert Sprague, 24-Butch Gilliland, 22-St. James Davis, 80-Bob Walker, 08-Rick McCray, 99-John Krebs, 38-Duke Hoenshell, 04-Hershel McGriff, 50-Rick Scribner

- Two cars entered by Hendrick Motorsports (the No. 46 City Chevrolet driven by Greg Sacks and the No. 51 Exxon Chevrolet driven by Bobby Hamilton) were entered to get in-race footage for the 1990 film Days of Thunder. Hamilton actually led the race with 100 laps to go (in his first career start) before the engine blew. A third movie car (the No. 18 Exxon Chevrolet driven by Tommy Ellis) failed to make the race.

=== Atlanta Journal 500 ===
The Atlanta Journal 500 was held November 19 at Atlanta Motor Speedway. Alan Kulwicki won the pole.

Top Ten Results

1. 3-Dale Earnhardt
2. 5-Geoff Bodine
3. 94-Sterling Marlin
4. 25-Ken Schrader
5. 17-Darrell Waltrip
6. 42-Kyle Petty
7. 8-Bobby Hillin Jr.
8. 75-Morgan Shepherd
9. 21-Neil Bonnett
10. 83-Lake Speed
- Three drivers entered the race mathematically eligible for the Winston Cup championship. Rusty Wallace had a 78-point lead over Mark Martin, and a 79-point lead over third-place Dale Earnhardt. Wallace had to finish 18th or better to clinch the title, but went into the race proclaiming he was going to 'run as hard as he could.' The statement was seen as a thinly veiled criticism of Bill Elliott whom Wallace lost the championship to a year earlier, in a similar situation. In that year, Elliott elected to drive a very conservative race, easily clinching the title, much to the ire of the hard-charging Wallace. Dale Earnhardt qualified 3rd, Wallace qualified 4th, but Martin would start back in 20th.
- Despite his plan to race all-out, Wallace encountered problems that complicated his day. On the first round of pit stops, he pitted under green but lost a lap when the caution came out shortly thereafter. Later, he suffered a flat tire and fell all the way back to the 33rd position. Wallace slowly and steadily worked his way back up the standings. Dale Earnhardt, meanwhile, dominated the race leading 294 of the 328 laps en route to victory. Mark Martin, the other driver in the mix for the championship did not end up being a factor. He dropped out on lap 224 with a blown engine that resulted in a fire. In the closing laps, Wallace was three laps down in 15th place, just barely holding on to the hypothetical points lead. Wallace managed to finish the race in 15th, and won the Winston Cup championship by a mere 12 points over Earnhardt. It was Wallace's first and only Winston Cup championship, and the first championship in the modern era for Pontiac.
- On lap 203, Grant Adcox struck the wall and suffered a heart attack and severe head injuries. Adcox died shortly after the accident.
- Final career top 10 for Neil Bonnett.

== Full Drivers' Championship ==
(key) Bold – Pole position awarded by time. Italics – Pole position set by owner's points. * – Most laps led.

Pos	Driver	DAY	CAR	ATL	RCH	DAR	BRI	NWS	MAR	TAL	CLT	DOV	SON	POC	MCH	DAY	POC	TAL	GLN	MCH	BRI	DAR	RCH	DOV	MAR	CLT	NWS	CAR	PHO	ATL	Pts
1	Rusty Wallace	18	**1***	31*	1	8	1	**9**	31	10	31	5	**2**	**22***	2*	17	2*	37	1	1*	6	4	1*	7	4*	8	7	2*	16	15	4176
2	Dale Earnhardt	3	3	2	3	33	16	1*	2	8	38	1*	4	3	17	18	9	11	3	17	14	1*	2	1*	**9**	42	10*	20	6	1*	4164
3	Mark Martin	33	5	38	11	**4**	**6**	3	6	**3**	6	**2**	31	15	12	**16**	3	**3**	2	9	20	2	17	2	23	3	2	1	3	30	4053
4	Darrell Waltrip	1	29	1	7	36	2	8	1*	5	1	9	38	32	3	19	4	2	16	37	1*	22	6	18	1	14	20	3	4	5	3971
5	Ken Schrader	**2***	25	15	19	27	32	14	7	6	3	3	37	4	**11**	36	**7**	4	20	11	23	5	24	3	10	1	13	4	**13**	4	3876
6	Bill Elliott	35	19	11	10	6	9	22	20	11	5	8	3	21	1	4*	1	12	18	39	24	7	**18**	4	15	**4***	6	15	1	27	3774
7	Harry Gant	12	31	29	14	1*	10	23	12	7	40	23	12	2	32	32	5	8	19	3	4	6	5	38	2	2	4	29	8	17	3610
8	Ricky Rudd	19	32	24	4	12	8	6	23	31	10	6	1*	20	4	9	31	17	29	8	3	3	4	5	8	21	9	28	29	14	3608
9	Geoff Bodine	4	4	19	**18***	3	3	7	**16**	12	4	29	20	35	27	22	17	35	21	**5**	16	12	3	27	16	22	1	7	28	2	3600
10	Terry Labonte	9	18	36	30	18	24	5	5	2	39	4	15	1	14	6	13	1	14	40	5	33	12	14	11	11	3	14	2	40	3569
11	Davey Allison	25	6	40	5	2	4	11	14	1*	33	32	9	16	31	1	6	9	4	7	25	18	10	**24**	21	5	21	26	39	25	3481
12	Sterling Marlin	11	7	5	8	5	15	26	8	14	2	26	40	6	8	7	36	28	7	34	18	10	28	17	20	7	19	23	30	3	3422
13	Morgan Shepherd	15	27	10	33	16	26	17	18	4	32	33	7	5	35	2	8	6*	**6***	2	26	9	27	16	28	10	5	36	12	8	3403
14	Alan Kulwicki	7	2	**16**	2	7	20	2	22	13	**23***	25	36	34	36	5	39	30	39	10	**2**	**32**	15	32	26	28	11	**9**	11*	**13**	3236
15	Dick Trickle **(R)**		13	3	25	13	5	4	3	27	29	21	30	24	25	8	20	16	34	19	28	17	8	25	3	30	12	5	7	35	3203
16	Bobby Hillin Jr.	39	15	30	15	26	27	DNQ	21	35	9	13	13	13	20	28	11	29	5	14	7	8	13	15	27	9	15	8	18	7	3139
17	Rick Wilson	8	17	6	17	11	21	30	4	15	35	14	8	27	6	29	25	5	8	32	27	11	22	19	18	41	29	13	40	18	3119
18	Michael Waltrip	21	12	20	13	9	11	29	25	21	27	22	10	14	16	34	28	36	10	31	32	13	23	6	12	17	23	17	9	26	3057
19	Brett Bodine	29	34	33	28	14	30	28	27	19	8	15	27	10	5	11	10	14	15	36	17	16	34	9	7	12	17	21	19	23	3051
20	Neil Bonnett	42	14	7	21	39	12	13	10	9	7	7	11	8	24	21	23	10	36	15	9	15	7	26				6	34	9	2995
21	Phil Parsons	5	39	14	27	41	23	12	13	17	13	10	18	12	15	3	12	41	17	33	11	21	36	13	14	20	28	24	37	42	2933
22	Ernie Irvan	41	23	12	9	24	29	10	19	25	15	17	23	26	18	23	26	20	24	25	15	24	26	33	6	33	8	16	33	11	2919
23	Larry Pearson **(R)**	14	30	22	6	20	18	24	29	29	22	19	19	9	19	30	40	22	11	16	21	29	20	40	25	15	24	12	24	19	2860
24	Dale Jarrett	32	11	9	23	40	22	19	15	40	28	11	42	7	22	31	18	23	23	38	10	20	35	23	5	24	27	39	5	16	2789
25	Dave Marcis	20	35	42	20	17	DNQ	20	9	20	16	16	16	18	21	25	19	19	25	24	12	28	16	22	DNQ	19	14	30	15	33	2715
26	Hut Stricklin **(R)**	DNQ	41	8	DNQ	30	28	16	30	33	14	12	21	17	33	10	37	13	22	4	19	19	9	20	17	23	30	22	23	20	2705
27	Lake Speed	30	8	21	12	10	25	27	11	18	24	18	5	11	7	24	29						14	36	22	38	25	19	22	10	2550
28	Derrike Cope	DNQ		34	35	35				39	12	28		36	9	26	35	38	40	6	29	25	25	8	13	6	26	11	14	12	2180
29	Richard Petty	17	16	27	DNQ	15	DNQ	DNQ	24	23	19	20	26	25	30	20	38	21	13	18	DNQ	35	33	30	24	34	32	34	42	28	2148
30	Kyle Petty	DNQ		4	DNQ	28				28	17				10	14	14	7		13	22	14	32	11	30	29	31	10	21	6	2099
31	Jimmy Means	DNQ	33	18	DNQ	38	DNQ	32	DNQ	41	41	24	DNQ	29	28	12	24	39	33	27	DNQ	26	19	21	31	37	22	31	25	DNQ	1698
32	Greg Sacks	23	9	26	34	25	7*	21	28	37	30				39		30			35	30	38	DNQ		19	35		18	38	29	1565
33	Jim Sauter	DNQ	10	32	36	19	13	31	DNQ	36	37					38	16		9	23	DNQ			12		40		33	17	21	1510
34	Jimmy Spencer **(R)**											34		33	13	27	15	40	28	12	8	37	29	10		16	18	35	10	37	1445
35	Rick Mast **(R)**	6	21	25	16	34	14	25	32	DNQ	11							32			13					13				31	1315
36	Eddie Bierschwale	10	26	23	31	21	19	18	DNQ	39	36	27	34		29		32		38	28						25				DNQ	1306
37	Ben Hess **(R)**	22	22	17	24	23	DNQ	15	17	22	20																				921
38	Chad Little **(R)**	36		35	22	37			26	34	18									26											602
39	Butch Miller **(R)**		42		26		31			DNQ	42				38					22			21		32				43		576
40	A. J. Foyt	38		28						16						35		18	37							Wth				36	527
41	Mickey Gibbs **(R)**	34	20	39	29					DNQ								25		DNQ						26				38	508
42	Rodney Combs	37	40	DNQ	32	29				DNQ	DNQ				40			DNQ		DNQ		23				32			27	41	470
43	Joe Ruttman	13											6				34	31		21	31	30					DNQ	27	20		469
44	J. D. McDuffie	24	37	DNQ	DNQ	31	DNQ	DNQ	DNQ	DNQ						DNQ	DNQ	DNQ	35	DNQ		36	31	34	DNQ	DNQ		DNQ		DNQ	457
45	Phil Barkdoll	31								32	DNQ					15		15													378
46	Jimmy Horton	DNQ		13		32				DNQ		31		37			33														377
47	Dick Johnson												32				22	24	32	DNQ											322
48	Ken Bouchard	16	38	37	DNQ	22																									313
49	Terry Byers										21			19		DNQ	21	DNQ													306
50	Darin Brassfield												22						12				30								297
51	Grant Adcox									24						13		DNQ												32	282
52	Jerry O'Neil		28					DNQ	DNQ		26															36		38		DNQ	268
53	Norm Benning											30		30			DNQ	DNQ						31							216
54	Ken Ragan									DNQ										29						27				39	204
55	Bill Schmitt												17																26		197
56	Tracy Leslie										25									20						DNQ				DNQ	191
57	Charlie Baker	40								26	DNQ					DNQ	DNQ	DNQ								DNQ		40			171
58	Bob Schacht																27											25			170
59	Jim Bown	DNQ	36	41							DNQ		29															37			
60	H. B. Bailey			DNQ							DNQ				26							27				DNQ					167
61	Stan Barrett															37		34	26										31		155
62	Rich Bickle																									39				22	143
63	Rob Moroso																							28						34	140
64	Lennie Pond																						11								130
65	Hershel McGriff												14																DNQ		121
66	Tommy Ellis																				DNQ				29	18	16		DNQ		115
67	John McFadden										DNQ					40						31									113
68	Brad Teague	QL					17																		QL	31					112
69	Patty Moise															39		33		DNQ										DNQ	110
70	Tommie Crozier													38										37				DNQ			101
71	Ron Esau									38			41																35		98
72	Bobby Gerhart	DNQ								DNQ				23																	94
73	Ronnie Thomas														23											DNQ					94
74	James Hylton																	DNQ		DNQ		39		39			DNQ				92
75	Jack Pennington																											32		24	91
76	Troy Beebe												24																		91
77	Dave Mader III		24							DNQ																					91
78	Bill Ingram				DNQ										DNQ	DNQ		26		DNQ											85
79	Terry Fisher												25																		84
80	Roy Smith												39																41		83
81	Mike Alexander	27																													82
82	Mark Stahl																	27										DNQ			82
83	Randy LaJoie	DNQ												28																	79
84	Rick McCray												28																DNQ		79
85	Ronnie Sanders	28																													79
86	Andy Belmont																							29							76
87	Rick Jeffrey			DNQ																30											73
88	Oma Kimbrough																		30												73
89	Bobby Hamilton																												32		72
90	Ted Thomas																		31												70
91	Mark Gibson	DNQ														33															64
92	John Krebs												33																DNQ		64
93	Allan Grice										34																				61
94	Mike Miller														34																61
95	Mike Potter																DNQ					34									61
96	Bill Cooper												35																		58
97	Jack Ely																DNQ							35							58
98	Bill Flowers											35																			58
99	Bill Sedgwick												DNQ																36		55
100	Bill Venturini														37																52
101	Lee Raymond	26		DNQ											DNQ																
102	Tommy Kendall																		27												
103	Trevor Boys	DNQ												31																	
104	Charlie Glotzbach	DNQ																													
105	Doug Heveron	DNQ																													
106	Connie Saylor	DNQ																													
107	Brad Noffsinger	DNQ																													
108	Ricky Woodward	DNQ																													
109	Tony Spanos	DNQ			DNQ					DNQ																					
110	Philip Duffie	DNQ								DNQ																					
111	Delma Cowart	DNQ								DNQ	DNQ					DNQ															
112	Steve Seligman				DNQ		DNQ		DNQ																						
113	Bill Meacham				DNQ			DNQ																				DNQ		DNQ	
114	Kevin Evan							DNQ																							
115	Mark Walbridge							DNQ	DNQ																				DNQ		
116	Walter Surma									DNQ																	DNQ				
117	Marta Leonard												DNQ																		
118	Jack Sellers												DNQ																DNQ		
119	Bob Walker												DNQ																DNQ		
120	Ed Sanger														DNQ																
121	Tom Rotsell																		DNQ												
122	Robert Pressley																									DNQ					
123	Dale Fischlein																										DNQ				
124	Robert Sprague																												DNQ		
125	Butch Gilliland																												DNQ		
126	St. James Davis																												DNQ		
127	Keith van Houten																												DNQ		
128	Duke Hoenshell																												DNQ		
129	Danny Lawson																												DNQ		
130	Bob Howard																												DNQ		
131	Rick Scribner																												DNQ		
132	David Pearson																									Wth					
133	Jimmy Hensley																								QL						
134	Tommy Houston																								QL						
Pos	Driver	DAY	CAR	ATL	RCH	DAR	BRI	NWS	MAR	TAL	CLT	DOV	SON	POC	MCH	DAY	POC	TAL	GLN	MCH	BRI	DAR	RCH	DOV	MAR	CLT	NWS	CAR	PHO	ATL	Pts

== Rookie of the Year ==
Dick Trickle was named the 1989 Winston Cup Rookie of the Year, despite entering the competition in the second week of the season, replacing Mike Alexander at Stavola Brothers Racing. The top runner-up was former Dash champion Hut Stricklin, driving for returning car owner Rod Osterlund. Two-time Busch champion Larry Pearson and former modified driver Jimmy Spencer were the only other candidates to make a full schedule, as Rick Mast, Ben Hess, Chad Little, Butch Miller, and Mickey Gibbs all ran part-time.

== See also ==
- 1989 NASCAR Busch Series
- 1989 NASCAR Winston West Series
