= 1989 First Union 400 =

Seventh race of the 1989 NASCAR Winston Cup Series

Race details
- Race 7 of 29 in the 1989 NASCAR Winston Cup Series
- The 1989 First Union 400 program cover, featuring Terry Labonte.
- Date: April 16, 1989
- Official name: 39th Annual First Union 400
- Location: North Wilkesboro Speedway, North Wilkesboro, North Carolina
- Course: Permanent racing facility
- Course length: 0.625 miles (1.006 km)
- Distance: 400 laps, 250 mi (402.336 km)
- Scheduled distance: 400 laps, 250 mi (402.336 km)
- Average speed: 89.937 miles per hour (144.740 km/h)
- Attendance: 36,000

Pole position
Driver	Rusty Wallace	Blue Max Racing
- Time: 19.145

Most laps led
Driver	Dale Earnhardt	Richard Childress Racing
- Laps: 296

Winner
No. 3	Dale Earnhardt	Richard Childress Racing

Television in the United States
- Network: ESPN
- Announcers: Bob Jenkins, Ned Jarrett, Benny Parsons

Radio in the United States
- Radio: Motor Racing Network

The 1989 First Union 400 was the seventh stock car race of the 1989 NASCAR Winston Cup Series and the 39th iteration of the event. The race was held on Sunday, April 16, 1989, before an audience of 36,000 in North Wilkesboro, North Carolina at the North Wilkesboro Speedway, a 0.625 miles (1.006 km) oval short track. The race took the scheduled 400 laps to complete. At race's end, Richard Childress Racing driver Dale Earnhardt would manage to dominate a majority of the race, leading 296 laps to take his 35th career NASCAR Winston Cup Series victory and his first victory of the season. To fill out the top three, owner-driver Alan Kulwicki and Roush Racing driver Mark Martin would finish second and third, respectively.

== Background ==
The layout of North Wilkesboro Speedway, the venue where the race was held

North Wilkesboro Speedway is a short oval racetrack located on U.S. Route 421, about five miles east of the town of North Wilkesboro, North Carolina, or 80 miles north of Charlotte. It measures 0.625 mi (1.006 km) and features a unique uphill backstretch and downhill frontstretch. It has previously held races in NASCAR's top three series, including 93 Winston Cup Series races. The track, a NASCAR original, operated from 1949, NASCAR's inception, until the track's original closure in 1996. The speedway briefly reopened in 2010 and hosted several stock car series races before closing again in the spring of 2011. It was re-opened in August 2022 for grassroots racing.

=== Entry list ===
- (R) denotes rookie driver.

#	Driver	Team	Make	Sponsor
2	Ernie Irvan	U.S. Racing	Pontiac	Kroger
3	Dale Earnhardt	Richard Childress Racing	Chevrolet	GM Goodwrench Service Plus
4	Rick Wilson	Morgan–McClure Motorsports	Oldsmobile	Kodak
5	Geoff Bodine	Hendrick Motorsports	Chevrolet	Levi Garrett
6	Mark Martin	Roush Racing	Ford	Stroh's Light
7	Alan Kulwicki	AK Racing	Ford	Zerex
8	Bobby Hillin Jr.	Stavola Brothers Racing	Buick	Miller High Life
9	Bill Elliott	Melling Racing	Ford	Coors Light
11	Terry Labonte	Junior Johnson & Associates	Ford	Budweiser
15	Brett Bodine	Bud Moore Engineering	Ford	Motorcraft
16	Larry Pearson (R)	Pearson Racing	Buick	Chattanooga Chew
17	Darrell Waltrip	Hendrick Motorsports	Chevrolet	Tide
21	Neil Bonnett	Wood Brothers Racing	Ford	Citgo
23	Eddie Bierschwale	B&B Racing	Oldsmobile	B&B Racing
25	Ken Schrader	Hendrick Motorsports	Chevrolet	Folgers
26	Ricky Rudd	King Racing	Buick	Quaker State
27	Rusty Wallace	Blue Max Racing	Pontiac	Kodiak
28	Davey Allison	Robert Yates Racing	Ford	Texaco, Havoline
29	Dale Jarrett	Cale Yarborough Motorsports	Pontiac	Hardee's
30	Michael Waltrip	Bahari Racing	Pontiac	Country Time
31	Jim Sauter	Bob Clark Motorsports	Pontiac	Bob Clark Motorsports
33	Harry Gant	Jackson Bros. Motorsports	Oldsmobile	Skoal Bandit
40	Ben Hess (R)	Hess Racing	Oldsmobile	Hess Racing
43	Richard Petty	Petty Enterprises	Pontiac	STP
52	Jimmy Means	Jimmy Means Racing	Pontiac	Alka-Seltzer
55	Phil Parsons	Jackson Bros. Motorsports	Oldsmobile	Skoal, Crown Central Petroleum
57	Hut Stricklin (R)	Osterlund Racing	Pontiac	Heinz
60	Rodney Combs (Note: Driver switched to Phil Parsons for the race after Parsons failed to qualify in his original entry.)	Combs Racing	Chevrolet	Combs Racing
66	Rick Mast (R)	Mach 1 Racing	Chevrolet	Banquet Foods
70	J. D. McDuffie	McDuffie Racing	Pontiac	Rumple Furniture
71	Dave Marcis	Marcis Auto Racing	Chevrolet	Lifebuoy
75	Morgan Shepherd	RahMoc Enterprises	Pontiac	Valvoline
83	Lake Speed	Speed Racing	Oldsmobile	Bull's-Eye Barbecue Sauce
84	Dick Trickle (R)	Stavola Brothers Racing	Buick	Miller High Life
88	Greg Sacks	Baker–Schiff Racing	Pontiac	Crisco
94	Sterling Marlin	Hagan Racing	Oldsmobile	Sunoco

== Qualifying ==
Qualifying was split into two rounds. The first round was held on Friday, April 14, at 3:00 pm EST. Each driver would have one lap to set a time. During the first round, the top 10 drivers in the round would be guaranteed a starting spot in the race. If a driver was not able to guarantee a spot in the first round, they had the option to scrub their time from the first round and try and run a faster lap time in a second round qualifying run, held on Saturday, April 15, at 12:15 pm EST. As with the first round, each driver would have one lap to set a time. For this specific race, positions 11-30 would be decided on time, and depending on who needed it, a select amount of positions were given to cars who had not otherwise qualified but were high enough in owner's points; up to two were given.

Rusty Wallace, driving for Blue Max Racing, would win the pole, setting a time of 19.357 and an average speed of 116.237 miles per hour (187.065 km/h) in the first round.

Four drivers would fail to qualify.

=== Full qualifying results ===
Pos.	#	Driver	Team	Make	Time	Speed
1	27	Rusty Wallace	Blue Max Racing	Pontiac	19.145	117.524
2	5	Geoff Bodine	Hendrick Motorsports	Chevrolet	19.190	117.249
3	3	Dale Earnhardt	Richard Childress Racing	Chevrolet	19.203	117.169
4	6	Mark Martin	Roush Racing	Ford	19.254	116.859
5	9	Bill Elliott	Melling Racing	Ford	19.273	116.744
6	94	Sterling Marlin	Hagan Racing	Oldsmobile	19.285	116.671
7	11	Terry Labonte	Junior Johnson & Associates	Ford	19.313	116.502
8	26	Ricky Rudd	King Racing	Buick	19.317	116.478
9	30	Michael Waltrip	Bahari Racing	Pontiac	19.372	116.147
10	84	Dick Trickle (R)	Stavola Brothers Racing	Buick	19.387	116.057
Failed to lock in Round 1
11	21	Neil Bonnett	Wood Brothers Racing	Ford	19.396	116.003
12	66	Rick Mast (R)	Mach 1 Racing	Chevrolet	19.400	115.979
13	7	Alan Kulwicki	AK Racing	Ford	19.405	115.949
14	40	Ben Hess (R)	Hess Racing	Oldsmobile	19.429	115.806
15	17	Darrell Waltrip	Hendrick Motorsports	Chevrolet	19.453	115.663
16	52	Jimmy Means	Jimmy Means Racing	Pontiac	19.483	115.485
17	28	Davey Allison	Robert Yates Racing	Ford	19.492	115.432
18	29	Dale Jarrett	Cale Yarborough Motorsports	Pontiac	19.513	115.308
19	88	Greg Sacks	Baker–Schiff Racing	Pontiac	19.515	115.296
20	15	Brett Bodine	Bud Moore Engineering	Ford	19.517	115.284
21	83	Lake Speed	Speed Racing	Oldsmobile	19.527	115.225
22	31	Jim Sauter	Bob Clark Motorsports	Pontiac	19.538	115.160
23	16	Larry Pearson (R)	Pearson Racing	Buick	19.548	115.101
24	57	Hut Stricklin (R)	Osterlund Racing	Pontiac	19.572	114.960
25	75	Morgan Shepherd	RahMoc Enterprises	Pontiac	19.590	114.855
26	71	Dave Marcis	Marcis Auto Racing	Chevrolet	19.597	114.813
27	4	Rick Wilson	Morgan–McClure Motorsports	Oldsmobile	19.634	114.597
28	60	Rodney Combs	Combs Racing	Chevrolet	19.634	114.597
29	2	Ernie Irvan	U.S. Racing	Pontiac	19.707	114.173
30	33	Harry Gant	Jackson Bros. Motorsports	Oldsmobile	19.775	113.780
Provisionals
31	25	Ken Schrader	Hendrick Motorsports	Chevrolet	19.780	113.751
32	23	Eddie Bierschwale	B&B Racing	Oldsmobile	19.859	113.299
Failed to qualify
33	8	Bobby Hillin Jr.	Stavola Brothers Racing	Buick	19.784	113.728
34	55	Phil Parsons	Jackson Bros. Motorsports	Oldsmobile	19.823	113.505
35	43	Richard Petty	Petty Enterprises	Pontiac	20.029	112.337
36	70	J. D. McDuffie	McDuffie Racing	Pontiac	-	-
Official first round qualifying results
Official starting lineup

== Race results ==
Fin	St	#	Driver	Team	Make	Laps	Led	Status	Pts	Winnings
1	3	3	Dale Earnhardt	Richard Childress Racing	Chevrolet	400	296	running	185	$51,225
2	13	7	Alan Kulwicki	AK Racing	Ford	400	0	running	170	$25,575
3	4	6	Mark Martin	Roush Racing	Ford	400	0	running	165	$19,425
4	10	84	Dick Trickle (R)	Stavola Brothers Racing	Buick	400	5	running	165	$13,800
5	7	11	Terry Labonte	Junior Johnson & Associates	Ford	400	0	running	155	$14,025
6	8	26	Ricky Rudd	King Racing	Buick	400	0	running	150	$7,475
7	2	5	Geoff Bodine	Hendrick Motorsports	Chevrolet	400	19	running	151	$9,200
8	15	17	Darrell Waltrip	Hendrick Motorsports	Chevrolet	400	74	running	147	$11,505
9	1	27	Rusty Wallace	Blue Max Racing	Pontiac	399	6	running	143	$16,850
10	29	2	Ernie Irvan	U.S. Racing	Pontiac	396	0	running	134	$9,575
11	17	28	Davey Allison	Robert Yates Racing	Ford	395	0	running	130	$9,495
12	28	60	Phil Parsons	Combs Racing	Chevrolet	394	0	running	127	$2,245
13	11	21	Neil Bonnett	Wood Brothers Racing	Ford	394	0	running	124	$5,170
14	31	25	Ken Schrader	Hendrick Motorsports	Chevrolet	394	0	running	121	$7,840
15	14	40	Ben Hess (R)	Hess Racing	Oldsmobile	393	0	running	118	$3,025
16	24	57	Hut Stricklin (R)	Osterlund Racing	Pontiac	390	0	running	115	$2,120
17	25	75	Morgan Shepherd	RahMoc Enterprises	Pontiac	390	0	running	112	$9,695
18	32	23	Eddie Bierschwale	B&B Racing	Oldsmobile	388	0	running	109	$3,395
19	18	29	Dale Jarrett	Cale Yarborough Motorsports	Pontiac	383	0	running	106	$4,745
20	26	71	Dave Marcis	Marcis Auto Racing	Chevrolet	376	0	running	103	$5,545
21	19	88	Greg Sacks	Baker–Schiff Racing	Pontiac	374	0	running	100	$6,350
22	5	9	Bill Elliott	Melling Racing	Ford	367	0	running	97	$11,250
23	30	33	Harry Gant	Jackson Bros. Motorsports	Oldsmobile	329	0	running	94	$6,025
24	23	16	Larry Pearson (R)	Pearson Racing	Buick	323	0	engine	91	$2,757
25	12	66	Rick Mast (R)	Mach 1 Racing	Chevrolet	321	0	engine	88	$4,200
26	6	94	Sterling Marlin	Hagan Racing	Oldsmobile	301	0	camshaft	85	$3,975
27	21	83	Lake Speed	Speed Racing	Oldsmobile	297	0	running	82	$3,875
28	20	15	Brett Bodine	Bud Moore Engineering	Ford	275	0	oil cooler	79	$4,575
29	9	30	Michael Waltrip	Bahari Racing	Pontiac	272	0	crash	76	$3,775
30	27	4	Rick Wilson	Morgan–McClure Motorsports	Oldsmobile	270	0	crash	73	$3,225
31	22	31	Jim Sauter	Bob Clark Motorsports	Pontiac	161	0	brakes	70	$1,650
32	16	52	Jimmy Means	Jimmy Means Racing	Pontiac	77	0	rear end	67	$1,650
Failed to qualify
33		8	Bobby Hillin Jr.	Stavola Brothers Racing	Buick					
34		55	Phil Parsons	Jackson Bros. Motorsports	Oldsmobile					
35		43	Richard Petty	Petty Enterprises	Pontiac					
36		70	J. D. McDuffie	McDuffie Racing	Pontiac					
Official race results

== Standings after the race ==
Drivers' Championship standings

	Pos	Driver	Points
3	1	Dale Earnhardt	1,054
1	2	Geoff Bodine	1,051 (-3)
	3	Alan Kulwicki	1,045 (-9)
2	4	Rusty Wallace	1,024 (–30)
1	5	Darrell Waltrip	954 (–100)
1	6	Sterling Marlin	936 (–93)
	7	Davey Allison	916 (–118)
1	8	Mark Martin	893 (–161)
4	9	Ricky Rudd	853 (–201)
5	10	Dick Trickle	831 (–223)
Official driver's standings

- Note: Only the first 10 positions are included for the driver standings.

== Notes ==
Previous race: 1989 Valleydale Meats 500	NASCAR Winston Cup Series; 1989 season	Next race: 1989 Pannill Sweatshirts 500
