= American Snuff Company =

American tobacco manufacturing company

American Snuff Company, LLC
- Formerly: Conwood Sales Company LLC
- Company type: Private (1900–86); Subsidiary (1986–)
- Industry: Tobacco
- Founded: 1900; 126 years ago in New York City
- Fate: Acquired by the Pritzker family in 1986, then traded to Reynolds
- Headquarters: United States
- Products: Dipping, chewing, snuff tobacco
- Parent: Reynolds American
- Website: americansnuffco.com

The American Snuff Company, formerly Conwood Sales Company LLC, is a US tobacco manufacturing company that makes a variety of smokeless tobacco products, including dipping tobacco or moist snuff, chewing tobacco in the forms of loose-leaf, plug, and twist, and dry snuff. It was originally formed in 1900 as a subsidiary trust to the American Tobacco Company.

== History ==
=== Prior to 1900 - Garretts ===
In 1726, John Garrett II built several mills on the banks of Red Clay Creek in Yorklyn, Delaware, including the Garrett Snuff Mill. His son and later descendants took over the business. The name changed as different family members took over the business. It was renamed to Levi Garrett and Sons when his son and grandsons took over, and then to Willam E. Garrett Company, and then William E. Garrett and Sons.

After the death of his brothers and father, the remaining family member, Walter Garrett, sold the Garrett Snuff Mill to three of his employees for one dollar.

The area around the original mill and the surrounding buildings is now known as the Garrett Snuff Mills Historic District. It was listed on the National Register of Historic Places in 1980.

=== Establishment of American Snuff Company ===
The company was originally established in 1900, in New York City when Garrett Scotch merged with several major tobacco companies of the time. This, however, created a monopoly and the company was later broken up into three separate companies. It was a subsidiary trust to the American Tobacco Company.

In 1901, the company built Mill 5. Snuff production increased a substantial amount under the trust.

=== Trust dissolution ===
In 1907, the Supreme Court of the United States rules that the American Tobacco Company and its fellow defendants, including the American Snuff Company, were in violation of the Sherman Antitrust Act and ordered to be dissolved into smaller companies, in United States v. American Tobacco Co. In 1911, the American Snuff Company was one of three new snuff companies created from the dissolution of the American Tobacco Company monopoly, as ordered by the Supreme Court of the United States. The three remaining snuff companies were the George W. Helme Snuff Company; the American Snuff Company; and the Weyman-Bruton Company.

=== New American Snuff Company ===
The new American Snuff Company, now run by Martin Condon, the former mayor of Knoxville, Tennessee, moved their headquarters and manufacturing to Memphis, Tennessee.

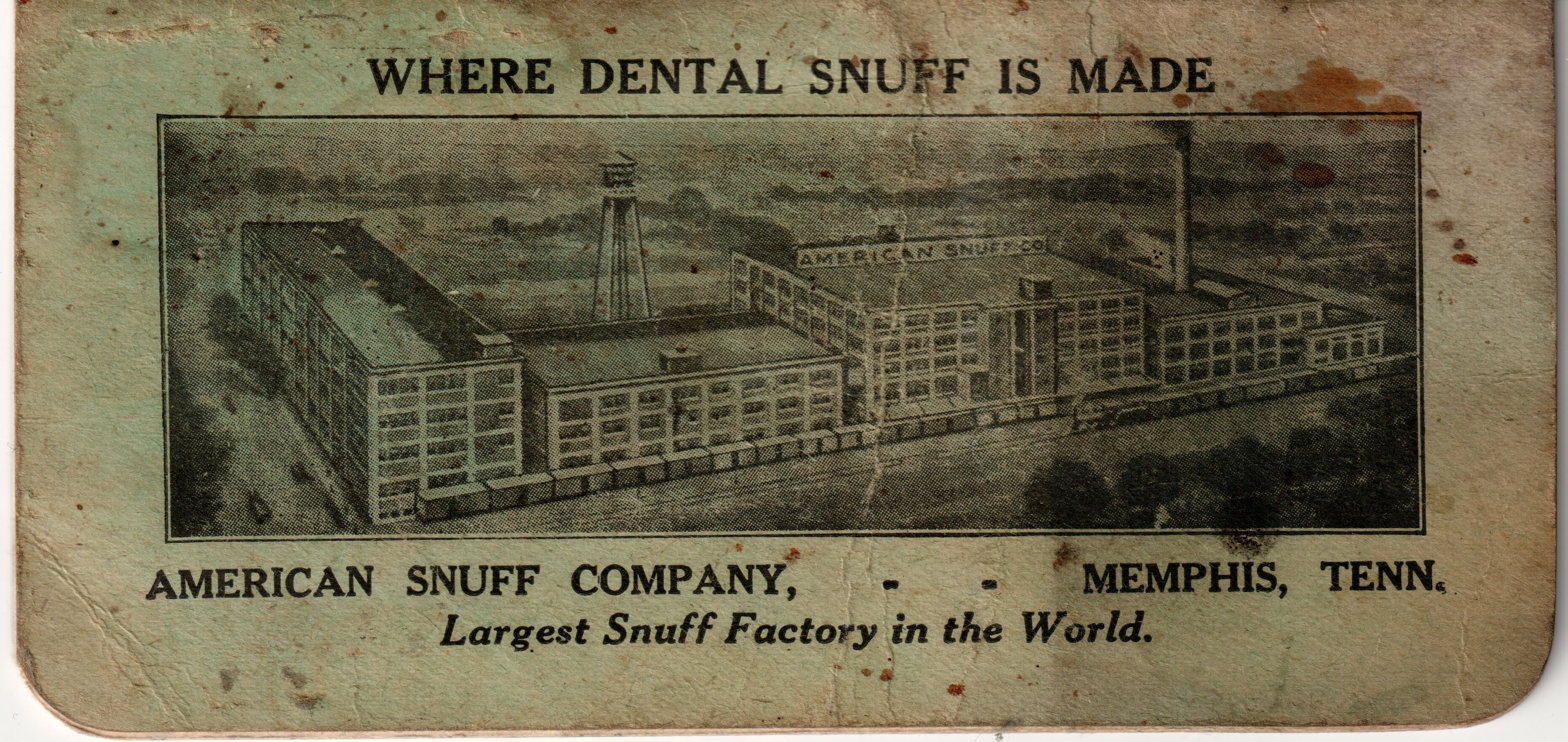
American Snuff Company on advertising booklet

The Wall Street Journal called the American Snuff Company “depression proof,” after it expanded its product lines to include sweet-flavored snuff, which decision resulted in higher sales than even during the company's pre-depression years.

The name was changed to Conwood LLC in the 1960s. From 1986 to 2006, Conwood was owned by the Pritzker family of Chicago. The company is currently a subsidiary of Reynolds American, after being acquired in mid-2006 for $3.5 billion in cash. When Reynolds American acquired Conwood, Reynolds subsidiary Lane Limited was merged into it. The name "American Snuff Company" was assumed in 2010.

As of 2017, American Snuff generated nearly 7% of Reynolds American's annual revenue. The current President of American Snuff Company is Chris Gemmell.

== Trademarks ==
In 1870, before the current American Snuff Company was even established, the Garrett company trademarked Garrett Scotch Snuff with the United States Patent and Trademark Office, which is the seventh trademark established in the United States . The American Snuff Company still holds the trademark Garrett Scotch Snuff. It is the only one of those first seven trademarks to remain in continuous production in the United States.

On November 7, 1950, American Snuff Company registered "W. E. Garrett & Sons" trademark first used in 1857.

On May 8, 1951, American Snuff Company registered "Levi Garrett & Sons" trademark first used in 1824

== Products and brands ==
Brands commercialized include:

=== Dipping tobacco ===
- Cougar
- Grizzly
- Kodiak

=== Chewing tobacco ===
- Levi Garrett
- Taylor's Pride
- H.B. Scott's
- Morgan's
- Peachey
- Hawken
- Cannonball Plug
- Mammoth Cave Twist
- Cumberland Twist
- Warren County Twist

=== Dry snuff ===
- Garrett
- Honest
- Tube Rose
- Peach
- Dental

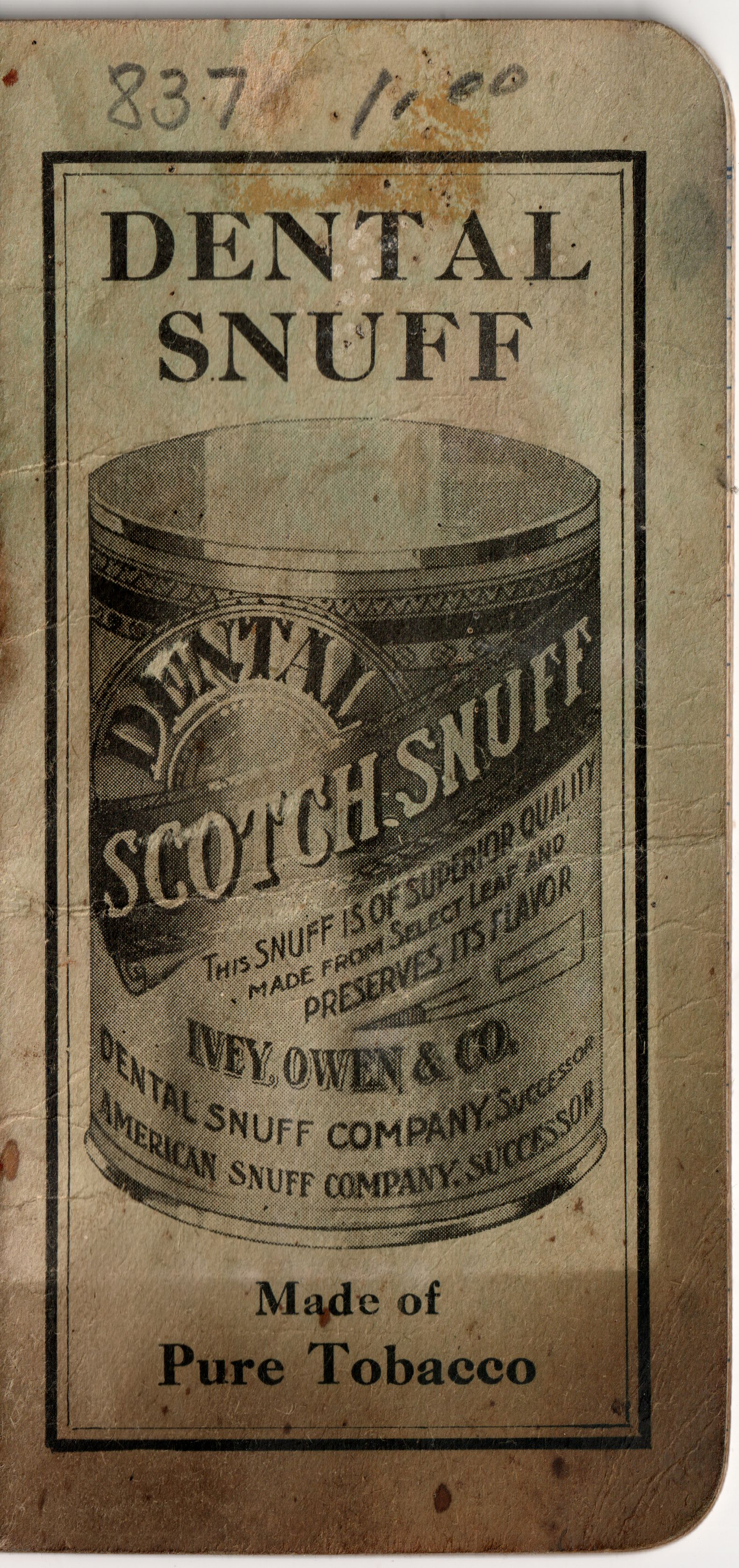
Dental Snuff advertising booklet

== Discontinued ==
=== Moist Snuff ===
- Wintermint

=== Chewing tobacco ===
- Conwood
- Moore's Red Leaf

=== Dry Snuff ===
- Big Wheel
- Big Bear Sweet Snuff
- Rainbow

== Facilities ==
- Clarksville, Tennessee, where tobacco is sourced from the region and then processed
- Winston-Salem, North Carolina, the former Taylor brothers facility, founded in 1883
