= 1988 Busch 500 =

20th race of the 1988 NASCAR Winston Cup Series

Race details
- Race 20 of 29 in the 1988 NASCAR Winston Cup Series
- The 1988 Busch 500 program cover, featuring Bill Elliott.
- Date: August 27, 1988
- Official name: 28th Annual Busch 500
- Location: Bristol, Tennessee, Bristol International Speedway
- Course: Permanent racing facility
- Course length: 0.858 km (0.533 miles)
- Distance: 500 laps, 266.5 mi (428.89 km)
- Scheduled distance: 500 laps, 266.5 mi (428.89 km)
- Average speed: 78.775 miles per hour (126.776 km/h)
- Attendance: 53,100

Pole position
Driver	Alan Kulwicki	AK Racing
- Time: 16.415

Most laps led
Driver	Dale Earnhardt	Richard Childress Racing
- Laps: 220

Winner
No. 3	Dale Earnhardt	Richard Childress Racing

Television in the United States
- Network: ESPN
- Announcers: Bob Jenkins, Ned Jarrett, Gary Nelson

Radio in the United States
- Radio: Motor Racing Network

The 1988 Busch 500 was the 20th stock car race of the 1988 NASCAR Winston Cup Series season and the 28th iteration of the event. The race was held on Saturday, August 27, 1988, before an audience of 54,000 in Bristol, Tennessee, at Bristol International Speedway, a 0.533 miles (0.858 km) permanent oval-shaped racetrack. The race took the scheduled 500 laps to complete. At race's end, Richard Childress Racing's Dale Earnhardt managed to dominate the late stages of the race, leading the final 110 laps to take his 34th career NASCAR Winston Cup Series victory and his third and final victory of the season. To fill out the top three, Melling Racing's Bill Elliott and Hendrick Motorsports's Geoff Bodine would finish second and third, respectively.

== Background ==
The layout of Bristol Motor Speedway, the venue where the race was held.

The Bristol Motor Speedway, formerly known as Bristol International Raceway and Bristol Raceway, is a NASCAR short track venue located in Bristol, Tennessee. Constructed in 1960, it held its first NASCAR race on July 30, 1961. Despite its short length, Bristol is among the most popular tracks on the NASCAR schedule because of its distinct features, which include extraordinarily steep banking, an all concrete surface, two pit roads, and stadium-like seating. It has also been named one of the loudest NASCAR tracks.

=== Entry list ===
- (R) denotes rookie driver.

#	Driver	Team	Make	Sponsor
2	Ernie Irvan (R)	U.S. Racing	Chevrolet	Kroger
3	Dale Earnhardt	Richard Childress Racing	Chevrolet	GM Goodwrench Service
4	Rick Wilson	Morgan–McClure Motorsports	Oldsmobile	Kodak
5	Geoff Bodine	Hendrick Motorsports	Chevrolet	Levi Garrett
6	Mark Martin	Roush Racing	Ford	Stroh Light
7	Alan Kulwicki	AK Racing	Ford	Zerex
8	Bobby Hillin Jr.	Stavola Brothers Racing	Buick	Miller High Life
9	Bill Elliott	Melling Racing	Ford	Coors Light
10	Ken Bouchard (R)	Whitcomb Racing	Ford	Whitcomb Racing
11	Terry Labonte	Junior Johnson & Associates	Chevrolet	Budweiser
12	Mike Alexander	Stavola Brothers Racing	Buick	Miller High Life
15	Brett Bodine	Bud Moore Engineering	Ford	Crisco
17	Darrell Waltrip	Hendrick Motorsports	Chevrolet	Tide
20	Dave Mader III	Bahre Racing	Pontiac	Bahre Racing
21	Kyle Petty	Wood Brothers Racing	Ford	Citgo
25	Ken Schrader	Hendrick Motorsports	Chevrolet	Folgers
26	Ricky Rudd	King Racing	Buick	Quaker State
27	Rusty Wallace	Blue Max Racing	Pontiac	Kodiak
28	Davey Allison	Ranier-Lundy Racing	Ford	Havoline
29	Dale Jarrett	Cale Yarborough Motorsports	Oldsmobile	Hardee's
30	Michael Waltrip	Bahari Racing	Pontiac	Country Time
31	Butch Miller	Bob Clark Motorsports	Oldsmobile	Slender You Figure Salons
32	Lee Faulk	Bob Clark Motorsports	Oldsmobile	Slender You Figure Salons
33	Harry Gant	Mach 1 Racing	Chevrolet	Skoal Bandit
41	Ronnie Thomas	Ronnie Thomas Racing	Chevrolet	Everride Radiator
43	Richard Petty	Petty Enterprises	Pontiac	STP
44	Sterling Marlin	Hagan Racing	Oldsmobile	Piedmont Airlines
52	Jimmy Means	Jimmy Means Racing	Pontiac	Eureka
55	Phil Parsons	Jackson Bros. Motorsports	Oldsmobile	Crown Central Petroleum, Skoal Classic
57	Morgan Shepherd	Osterlund Racing	Buick	Heinz Ketchup
67	Ron Esau	Arrington Racing	Ford	Pannill Sweatshirts
68	Derrike Cope	Testa Racing	Ford	Purolator Filters
70	J. D. McDuffie	McDuffie Racing	Pontiac	Rumple Furniture
71	Dave Marcis	Marcis Auto Racing	Chevrolet	Lifebuoy
75	Neil Bonnett	RahMoc Enterprises	Pontiac	Valvoline
83	Lake Speed	Speed Racing	Oldsmobile	Wynn's, Kmart
88	Rick Mast	Baker-Schiff Racing	Oldsmobile	Red Baron Frozen Pizza
90	Tommy Ellis	Donlavey Racing	Ford	Sunny King Ford
97	Rodney Combs	Winkle Motorsports	Buick	AC Spark Plug
98	Brad Noffsinger (R)	Curb Racing	Buick	Sunoco

== Qualifying ==
Qualifying was split into two rounds. The first round was held on Friday, August 26, at 7:35 PM EST. Each driver would have one lap to set a time. During the first round, the top 15 drivers in the round would be guaranteed a starting spot in the race. If a driver was not able to guarantee a spot in the first round, they had the option to scrub their time from the first round and try and run a faster lap time in a second round qualifying run, held on Saturday, August 27, at 1:00 PM EST. As with the first round, each driver would have one lap to set a time. For this specific race, positions 15-30 would be decided on time, and depending on who needed it, a select amount of positions were given to cars who had not otherwise qualified on time but were high enough in owner's points; up to two provisionals were given.

Alan Kulwicki, driving for his own AK Racing team, would win the pole, setting a time of 16.415 and an average speed of 116.893 miles per hour (188.121 km/h) in the first round.

Eight drivers would fail to qualify.

=== Full qualifying results ===
Pos.	#	Driver	Team	Make	Time	Speed
1	7	Alan Kulwicki	AK Racing	Ford	16.415	116.893
2	6	Mark Martin	Roush Racing	Ford	16.454	116.616
3	5	Geoff Bodine	Hendrick Motorsports	Chevrolet	16.574	115.772
4	17	Darrell Waltrip	Hendrick Motorsports	Chevrolet	16.630	115.382
5	3	Dale Earnhardt	Richard Childress Racing	Chevrolet	16.676	115.064
6	9	Bill Elliott	Melling Racing	Ford	16.723	114.740
7	33	Harry Gant	Mach 1 Racing	Chevrolet	16.785	114.316
8	4	Rick Wilson	Morgan–McClure Motorsports	Oldsmobile	16.818	114.092
9	25	Ken Schrader	Hendrick Motorsports	Chevrolet	16.819	114.085
10	11	Terry Labonte	Junior Johnson & Associates	Chevrolet	16.839	113.950
11	28	Davey Allison	Ranier-Lundy Racing	Ford	16.865	113.774
12	31	Butch Miller	Bob Clark Motorsports	Oldsmobile	16.883	113.653
13	44	Sterling Marlin	Hagan Racing	Oldsmobile	16.905	113.505
14	68	Derrike Cope	Testa Racing	Ford	16.922	113.391
15	29	Dale Jarrett	Cale Yarborough Motorsports	Oldsmobile	16.930	113.337
Failed to lock in Round 1
16	15	Brett Bodine	Bud Moore Engineering	Ford	16.931	113.331
17	27	Rusty Wallace	Blue Max Racing	Pontiac	16.953	113.184
18	71	Dave Marcis	Marcis Auto Racing	Chevrolet	16.964	113.110
19	26	Ricky Rudd	King Racing	Buick	16.967	113.090
20	43	Richard Petty	Petty Enterprises	Pontiac	16.987	112.957
21	2	Ernie Irvan (R)	U.S. Racing	Pontiac	16.991	112.930
22	21	Kyle Petty	Wood Brothers Racing	Ford	17.003	112.851
23	55	Phil Parsons	Jackson Bros. Motorsports	Oldsmobile	17.016	112.764
24	83	Lake Speed	Speed Racing	Oldsmobile	17.016	112.764
25	88	Rick Mast	Baker–Schiff Racing	Oldsmobile	17.017	112.758
26	12	Mike Alexander	Stavola Brothers Racing	Buick	17.030	112.672
27	20	Dave Mader III	Bahre Racing	Pontiac	17.062	112.460
28	97	Rodney Combs	Winkle Motorsports	Buick	17.066	112.434
29	75	Neil Bonnett	RahMoc Enterprises	Pontiac	17.068	112.421
30	98	Brad Noffsinger (R)	Curb Racing	Buick	17.084	112.316
Provisionals
31	8	Bobby Hillin Jr.	Stavola Brothers Racing	Buick	-*	-*
32	30	Michael Waltrip	Bahari Racing	Pontiac	-*	-*
Failed to qualify
33	57	Morgan Shepherd	Osterlund Racing	Buick	-*	-*
34	52	Jimmy Means	Jimmy Means Racing	Pontiac	-*	-*
35	90	Tommy Ellis	Donlavey Racing	Ford	-*	-*
36	10	Ken Bouchard (R)	Whitcomb Racing	Ford	-*	-*
37	41	Ronnie Thomas	Ronnie Thomas Racing	Chevrolet	-*	-*
38	32	Lee Faulk	Bob Clark Motorsports	Oldsmobile	-*	-*
39	70	J. D. McDuffie	McDuffie Racing	Pontiac	-*	-*
40	67	Ron Esau	Arrington Racing	Ford	-*	-*
Official first round qualifying results
Official starting lineup

== Race results ==
Fin	St	#	Driver	Team	Make	Laps	Led	Status	Pts	Winnings
1	5	3	Dale Earnhardt	Richard Childress Racing	Chevrolet	500	220	running	185	$48,500
2	6	9	Bill Elliott	Melling Racing	Ford	500	3	running	175	$29,150
3	3	5	Geoff Bodine	Hendrick Motorsports	Chevrolet	499	15	running	170	$17,475
4	11	28	Davey Allison	Ranier-Lundy Racing	Ford	499	17	running	165	$16,775
5	1	7	Alan Kulwicki	AK Racing	Ford	499	21	running	160	$16,410
6	7	33	Harry Gant	Mach 1 Racing	Chevrolet	497	24	running	155	$7,525
7	4	17	Darrell Waltrip	Hendrick Motorsports	Chevrolet	497	3	running	151	$9,300
8	20	43	Richard Petty	Petty Enterprises	Pontiac	497	0	running	142	$6,300
9	17	27	Rusty Wallace	Blue Max Racing	Pontiac	493	0	running	138	$10,800
10	31	8	Bobby Hillin Jr.	Stavola Brothers Racing	Buick	492	0	running	134	$9,050
11	28	97	Rodney Combs	Winkle Motorsports	Buick	489	0	running	130	$2,450
12	13	44	Sterling Marlin	Hagan Racing	Oldsmobile	481	0	running	127	$5,350
13	22	21	Kyle Petty	Wood Brothers Racing	Ford	479	65	running	129	$7,950
14	29	75	Neil Bonnett	RahMoc Enterprises	Pontiac	476	0	running	121	$7,850
15	21	2	Ernie Irvan (R)	U.S. Racing	Pontiac	452	0	running	118	$3,450
16	19	26	Ricky Rudd	King Racing	Buick	451	10	engine	120	$4,850
17	12	31	Butch Miller	Bob Clark Motorsports	Oldsmobile	438	0	engine	0	$3,175
18	26	12	Mike Alexander	Stavola Brothers Racing	Buick	428	0	running	109	$7,525
19	23	55	Phil Parsons	Jackson Bros. Motorsports	Oldsmobile	417	0	overheating	106	$4,475
20	24	83	Lake Speed	Speed Racing	Oldsmobile	391	66	running	108	$3,425
21	9	25	Ken Schrader	Hendrick Motorsports	Chevrolet	388	0	running	100	$6,835
22	10	11	Terry Labonte	Junior Johnson & Associates	Chevrolet	331	17	engine	102	$7,305
23	8	4	Rick Wilson	Morgan–McClure Motorsports	Oldsmobile	285	0	crash	94	$2,435
24	27	20	Dave Mader III	Bahre Racing	Pontiac	271	0	engine	91	$1,565
25	16	15	Brett Bodine	Bud Moore Engineering	Ford	252	0	crash	88	$8,945
26	15	29	Dale Jarrett	Cale Yarborough Motorsports	Oldsmobile	207	0	crash	85	$2,325
27	2	6	Mark Martin	Roush Racing	Ford	207	37	crash	87	$3,480
28	25	88	Rick Mast	Baker–Schiff Racing	Oldsmobile	207	2	crash	0	$3,660
29	18	71	Dave Marcis	Marcis Auto Racing	Chevrolet	142	0	crash	76	$3,615
30	14	68	Derrike Cope	Testa Racing	Ford	93	0	overheating	73	$3,550
31	32	30	Michael Waltrip	Bahari Racing	Pontiac	54	0	engine	70	$2,950
32	30	98	Brad Noffsinger (R)	Curb Racing	Buick	1	0	crash	67	$1,700
Failed to qualify
33		57	Morgan Shepherd	Osterlund Racing	Buick					
34		52	Jimmy Means	Jimmy Means Racing	Pontiac					
35		90	Tommy Ellis	Donlavey Racing	Ford					
36		10	Ken Bouchard (R)	Whitcomb Racing	Ford					
37		41	Ronnie Thomas	Ronnie Thomas Racing	Chevrolet					
38		32	Lee Faulk	Bob Clark Motorsports	Oldsmobile					
39		70	J. D. McDuffie	McDuffie Racing	Pontiac					
40		67	Ron Esau	Arrington Racing	Ford					
Official race results

== Standings after the race ==
Drivers' Championship standings

	Pos	Driver	Points
1	1	Bill Elliott	3,027
1	2	Rusty Wallace	3,011 (-16)
	3	Dale Earnhardt	2,901 (-126)
	4	Ken Schrader	2,702 (–325)
	5	Terry Labonte	2,654 (–373)
	6	Geoff Bodine	2,640 (–387)
	7	Sterling Marlin	2,544 (–483)
	8	Phil Parsons	2,511 (–516)
	9	Darrell Waltrip	2,504 (–523)
	10	Bobby Hillin Jr.	2,369 (–658)
Official driver's standings

- Note: Only the first 10 positions are included for the driver standings.

Previous race: 1988 Champion Spark Plug 400	NASCAR Winston Cup Series; 1988 season	Next race: 1988 Southern 500
