= Martin Road Bridge =

- U.S. National Register of Historic Places
- Michigan State Historic Site
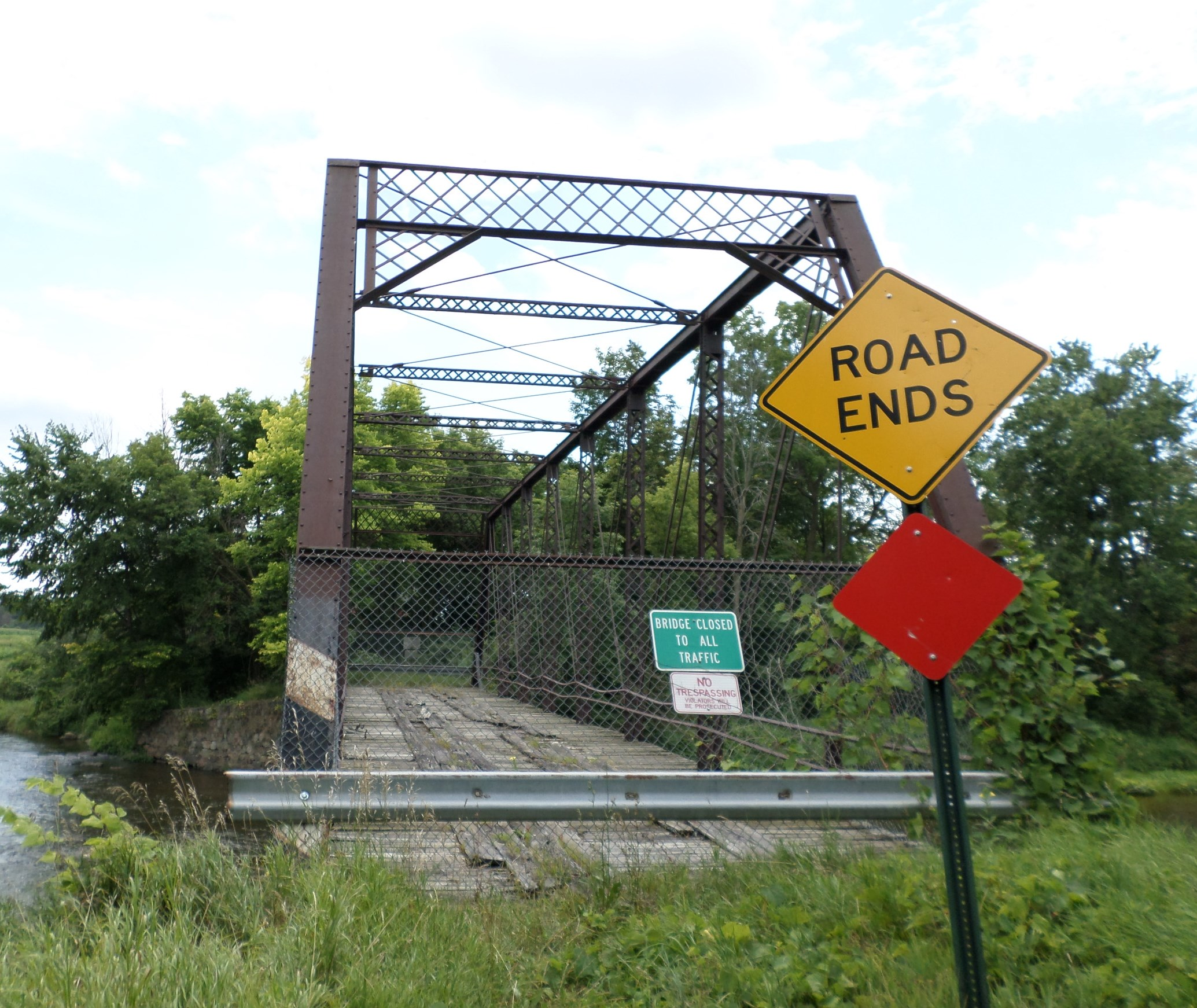
- Martin Road Bridge at the original location
- Interactive map
- Nearest city: Corunna, Michigan
- Coordinates: 42°58′08″N 84°03′21″W
- Area: less than one acre
- Architect: Mt. Vernon Bridge Co.
- Architectural style: Pratt through truss bridge
- NRHP reference No.: 91000876
- Added to NRHP: July 12, 1991

The Martin Road Bridge (also known as the Snuff Mill Bridge or Snuff Mill Road Bridge) is a former road bridge which carried Martin Road across the Shiawassee River in Caledonia Township near Corunna. It was one of the oldest metal through truss highway bridges in Michigan, and was listed on the National Register of Historic Places in 1991. As of 2016, the bridge has been removed from its original site, and will be restored and reassembled at the Auburn Valley State Park in Yorklyn, Delaware.

== History ==
In about 1850, settler Titus Yerkes dammed the river near this point and constructed a mill. A second mill was constructed later in the nineteenth century, and this location became an important local milling center. It is not known when the first Martin Road bridge was constructed, but there was one in place by 1874. This bridge was apparently washed out in the 1880s, and in 1885, Caledonia Township contracted with the Mount Vernon Bridge Company of Mount Vernon, Ohio to design and construct a replacement bridge. The company installed this bridge at the site. It is the only known example of this firm's highway bridge work known to survive in Michigan. Although the bridge was in use for years, the mills that made this river crossing locally important were gone by 1908.

However, the bridge eventually deteriorated, and it was closed to traffic in 1987. In 2015, the township sold the Auburn Valley State Park in Yorklyn, Delaware. In 2016, the bridge was disassembled and removed by Bach Steel. Renovation is underway. As of 2021, the Park's master plan envisioned the bridge (rechristened the "Snuff Mill Road Bridge") being widened and used as part of a recreational trail.

== Description ==
The Martin Road Bridge is a single-span, metal, pin-connected, Pratt through truss structure having. The bridge is 119 feet long and fifteen feet wide between the trusses. The deck is made up of three-by-eight-inch wooden planks, supported by six rows of six-inch I-beams and two rows of six-inch channels, all supported by sixteen-inch metal floor beams. In its original location, rubble fieldstone abutments on each bank supported the bridge. A plaque mounted on one end post names the bridge's builder, the Mt. Vernon Bridge Company of Mt. Vernon, Ohio, and the 1885 year of construction.
