= 1988 Champion Spark Plug 400 =

19th race of the 1988 NASCAR Winston Cup Series

Race details
- Race 19 of 29 in the 1988 NASCAR Winston Cup Series
- The 1988 Champion Spark Plug 400 program cover, featuring Richard Petty.
- Date: August 21, 1988
- Official name: 19th Annual Champion Spark Plug 400
- Location: Brooklyn, Michigan, Michigan International Speedway
- Course: Permanent racing facility
- Course length: 2 miles (3.2 km)
- Distance: 200 laps, 400 mi (643.737 km)
- Scheduled distance: 200 laps, 400 mi (643.737 km)
- Average speed: 156.863 miles per hour (252.447 km/h)
- Attendance: 72,000

Pole position
Driver	Bill Elliott	Melling Racing
- Time: 41.157

Most laps led
Driver	Rusty Wallace	Blue Max Racing
- Laps: 75

Winner
No. 28	Davey Allison	Ranier-Lundy Racing

Television in the United States
- Network: ESPN
- Announcers: Bob Jenkins, Ned Jarrett, Gary Nelson

Radio in the United States
- Radio: Motor Racing Network

The 1988 Champion Spark Plug 400 was the 19th stock car race of the 1988 NASCAR Winston Cup Series season and the 19th iteration of the event. The race was held on Sunday, August 21, 1988, before an audience of 72,000 in Brooklyn, Michigan, at Michigan International Speedway, a two-mile (3.2 km) moderate-banked D-shaped speedway. The race took the scheduled 200 laps to complete. Taking advantage of a misfortunate Bill Elliott, Ranier-Lundy Racing driver Davey Allison would manage to lead the final 23 laps of the race to take his third career NASCAR Winston Cup Series victory and his first victory of the season. To fill out the top three, Blue Max Racing driver Rusty Wallace and Melling Racing driver Bill Elliott would finish second and third, respectively.

== Background ==
The layout of Michigan International Speedway, the venue where the race was held.

The race was held at Michigan International Speedway, a two-mile (3.2 km) moderate-banked D-shaped speedway located in Brooklyn, Michigan. The track is used primarily for NASCAR events. It is known as a "sister track" to Texas World Speedway as MIS's oval design was a direct basis of TWS, with moderate modifications to the banking in the corners, and was used as the basis of Auto Club Speedway. The track is owned by International Speedway Corporation. Michigan International Speedway is recognized as one of motorsports' premier facilities because of its wide racing surface and high banking (by open-wheel standards; the 18-degree banking is modest by stock car standards).

=== Entry list ===
- (R) denotes rookie driver.

#	Driver	Team	Make	Sponsor
1	Dale Jarrett	Ellington Racing	Buick	Port-A-Lube, Bud Light
01	Mickey Gibbs	Gibbs Racing	Ford	Gibbs–West Tractor
2	Ernie Irvan (R)	U.S. Racing	Chevrolet	Kroger
3	Dale Earnhardt	Richard Childress Racing	Chevrolet	GM Goodwrench Service
4	Rick Wilson	Morgan–McClure Motorsports	Oldsmobile	Kodak
5	Geoff Bodine	Hendrick Motorsports	Chevrolet	Levi Garrett
6	Mark Martin	Roush Racing	Ford	Stroh Light
06	Lee Raymond	Coyle Racing	Chevrolet	Riverside Auto Parts
7	Alan Kulwicki	AK Racing	Ford	Zerex
07	Larry Moyer	Stark Racing	Pontiac	Hooters, Just Say No!
8	Bobby Hillin Jr.	Stavola Brothers Racing	Buick	Miller High Life
9	Bill Elliott	Melling Racing	Ford	Coors Light
10	Ken Bouchard (R)	Whitcomb Racing	Ford	Whitcomb Racing
11	Terry Labonte	Junior Johnson & Associates	Chevrolet	Budweiser
12	Mike Alexander	Stavola Brothers Racing	Buick	Miller High Life
15	Brett Bodine	Bud Moore Engineering	Ford	Crisco
17	Darrell Waltrip	Hendrick Motorsports	Chevrolet	Tide
19	Chad Little	Little Racing	Ford	Coors Extra Gold
21	Kyle Petty	Wood Brothers Racing	Ford	Citgo
23	Eddie Bierschwale	B&B Racing	Oldsmobile	Wayne Paging
25	Ken Schrader	Hendrick Motorsports	Chevrolet	Folgers
26	Ricky Rudd	King Racing	Buick	Quaker State
27	Rusty Wallace	Blue Max Racing	Pontiac	Kodiak
28	Davey Allison	Ranier-Lundy Racing	Ford	Havoline
29	Cale Yarborough	Cale Yarborough Motorsports	Oldsmobile	Hardee's
30	Michael Waltrip	Bahari Racing	Pontiac	Country Time
31	Donnie Allison	Bob Clark Motorsports	Oldsmobile	Slender You Figure Salons
33	Harry Gant	Mach 1 Racing	Chevrolet	Skoal Bandit
36	H. B. Bailey	Bailey Racing	Pontiac	Almeda Auto Parts
38	Mike Laws	ProStar Motorsports	Oldsmobile	ProStar Motorsports
40	Ben Hess	Hess Racing	Oldsmobile	Hess Racing
43	Richard Petty	Petty Enterprises	Pontiac	STP
44	Sterling Marlin	Hagan Racing	Oldsmobile	Piedmont Airlines
50	Greg Sacks	Dingman Brothers Racing	Pontiac	Dingman Brothers Racing
51	David Simko	Simko Racing	Pontiac	Tom Company
52	Jimmy Means	Jimmy Means Racing	Pontiac	Eureka
55	Phil Parsons	Jackson Bros. Motorsports	Oldsmobile	Crown Central Petroleum, Skoal
67	Ron Esau	Arrington Racing	Ford	Pannill Sweatshirts
68	Derrike Cope	Testa Racing	Ford	Purolator Filters
70	J. D. McDuffie	McDuffie Racing	Pontiac	Rumple Furniture
71	Dave Marcis	Marcis Auto Racing	Chevrolet	Lifebuoy
75	Neil Bonnett	RahMoc Enterprises	Pontiac	Valvoline
80	Jimmy Horton (R)	S&H Racing	Ford	S&H Racing
83	Lake Speed	Speed Racing	Oldsmobile	Wynn's, Kmart
88	Morgan Shepherd	Baker-Schiff Racing	Oldsmobile	Red Baron Frozen Pizza
89	Jim Sauter	Mueller Brothers Racing	Pontiac	Evinrude Outboard Motors
90	Benny Parsons	Donlavey Racing	Ford	Bull's-Eye Barbecue Sauce
95	Slick Johnson	Sadler Brothers Racing	Chevrolet	Sadler Brothers Racing
96	Dana Patten	Patten Racing	Buick	U.S. Chrome
97	Rodney Combs	Winkle Motorsports	Buick	AC Spark Plug
98	Brad Noffsinger (R)	Curb Racing	Buick	Sunoco

== Qualifying ==
Qualifying was split into two rounds. The first round was held on Saturday, August 20, at 11:30 AM EST. Each driver would have one lap to set a time. During the first round, the top 20 drivers in the round would be guaranteed a starting spot in the race. If a driver was not able to guarantee a spot in the first round, they had the option to scrub their time from the first round and try and run a faster lap time in a second round qualifying run, held on Saturday, August 20, at 2:00 PM EST. As with the first round, each driver would have one lap to set a time. For this specific race, positions 21-40 would be decided on time, and depending on who needed it, a select amount of positions were given to cars who had not otherwise qualified but were high enough in owner's points; up to two were given.

Bill Elliott, driving for Melling Racing, would win the pole, setting a time of 41.157 and an average speed of 174.940 miles per hour (281.539 km/h) in the first round.

Nine drivers would fail to qualify.

=== Full qualifying results ===
Pos.	#	Driver	Team	Make	Time	Speed
1	9	Bill Elliott	Melling Racing	Ford	41.157	174.940
2	5	Geoff Bodine	Hendrick Motorsports	Chevrolet	41.289	174.381
3	25	Ken Schrader	Hendrick Motorsports	Chevrolet	41.295	174.355
4	28	Davey Allison	Ranier-Lundy Racing	Ford	41.342	174.157
5	3	Dale Earnhardt	Richard Childress Racing	Chevrolet	41.343	174.153
6	15	Brett Bodine	Bud Moore Engineering	Ford	41.434	173.770
7	27	Rusty Wallace	Blue Max Racing	Pontiac	41.449	173.707
8	7	Alan Kulwicki	AK Racing	Ford	41.472	173.611
9	88	Morgan Shepherd	Baker-Schiff Racing	Oldsmobile	41.520	173.410
10	26	Ricky Rudd	King Racing	Buick	41.617	173.006
11	1	Dale Jarrett	Ellington Racing	Buick	41.738	172.505
12	12	Mike Alexander	Stavola Brothers Racing	Buick	41.745	172.476
13	55	Phil Parsons	Jackson Bros. Motorsports	Oldsmobile	41.752	172.447
14	44	Sterling Marlin	Hagan Racing	Oldsmobile	41.769	172.377
15	17	Darrell Waltrip	Hendrick Motorsports	Chevrolet	41.779	172.335
16	83	Lake Speed	Speed Racing	Oldsmobile	41.805	172.228
17	68	Derrike Cope	Testa Racing	Ford	41.814	172.191
18	71	Dave Marcis	Marcis Auto Racing	Chevrolet	41.844	172.068
19	75	Neil Bonnett	RahMoc Enterprises	Pontiac	41.881	171.916
20	11	Terry Labonte	Junior Johnson & Associates	Chevrolet	41.884	171.903
Failed to lock in Round 1
21	90	Benny Parsons	Donlavey Racing	Ford	41.885	171.899
22	21	Kyle Petty	Wood Brothers Racing	Ford	41.911	171.793
23	4	Rick Wilson	Morgan–McClure Motorsports	Oldsmobile	41.924	171.739
24	43	Richard Petty	Petty Enterprises	Pontiac	41.931	171.711
25	97	Rodney Combs	Winkle Motorsports	Buick	41.941	171.670
26	6	Mark Martin	Roush Racing	Ford	41.947	171.645
27	33	Harry Gant	Mach 1 Racing	Chevrolet	41.991	171.465
28	30	Michael Waltrip	Bahari Racing	Pontiac	42.002	171.420
29	23	Eddie Bierschwale	B&B Racing	Oldsmobile	42.003	171.416
30	52	Jimmy Means	Jimmy Means Racing	Pontiac	42.080	171.103
31	50	Greg Sacks	Dingman Brothers Racing	Pontiac	42.082	171.095
32	01	Mickey Gibbs	Gibbs Racing	Ford	42.086	171.078
33	96	Dana Patten	Patten Racing	Buick	42.152	170.810
34	19	Chad Little	Little Racing	Ford	42.153	170.806
35	29	Cale Yarborough	Cale Yarborough Motorsports	Oldsmobile	42.182	170.689
36	89	Jim Sauter	Mueller Brothers Racing	Pontiac	42.217	170.547
37	10	Ken Bouchard (R)	Whitcomb Racing	Ford	42.225	170.515
38	36	H. B. Bailey	Bailey Racing	Pontiac	42.225	170.515
39	8	Bobby Hillin Jr.	Stavola Brothers Racing	Buick	42.259	170.378
40	2	Ernie Irvan (R)	U.S. Racing	Pontiac	42.362	169.964
Provisionals
41	31	Donnie Allison	Bob Clark Motorsports	Oldsmobile	42.373	169.920
42	98	Brad Noffsinger (R)	Curb Racing	Buick	42.775	168.323
Failed to qualify
43	51	David Simko	Simko Racing	Pontiac	42.718	168.547
44	40	Ben Hess	Hess Racing	Oldsmobile	42.719	168.543
45	80	Jimmy Horton (R)	S&H Racing	Ford	42.867	167.961
46	67	Ron Esau	Arrington Racing	Ford	43.017	167.376
47	95	Slick Johnson	Sadler Brothers Racing	Chevrolet	43.033	167.313
48	38	Mike Laws	ProStar Motorsports	Oldsmobile	43.362	166.044
49	70	J. D. McDuffie	McDuffie Racing	Pontiac	43.650	164.948
50	06	Lee Raymond	Coyle Racing	Chevrolet	44.078	163.347
51	07	Larry Moyer	Stark Racing	Pontiac	-	-
Official starting lineup

== Race results ==
Fin	St	#	Driver	Team	Make	Laps	Led	Status	Pts	Winnings
1	4	28	Davey Allison	Ranier-Lundy Racing	Ford	200	38	running	180	$60,475
2	7	27	Rusty Wallace	Blue Max Racing	Pontiac	200	75	running	180	$37,250
3	1	9	Bill Elliott	Melling Racing	Ford	200	36	running	170	$31,775
4	9	88	Morgan Shepherd	Baker-Schiff Racing	Oldsmobile	200	6	running	165	$19,600
5	16	83	Lake Speed	Speed Racing	Oldsmobile	200	0	running	155	$14,650
6	6	15	Brett Bodine	Bud Moore Engineering	Ford	200	0	running	150	$18,425
7	28	30	Michael Waltrip	Bahari Racing	Pontiac	200	0	running	146	$12,365
8	22	21	Kyle Petty	Wood Brothers Racing	Ford	200	0	running	142	$14,365
9	23	4	Rick Wilson	Morgan–McClure Motorsports	Oldsmobile	200	0	running	138	$8,910
10	2	5	Geoff Bodine	Hendrick Motorsports	Chevrolet	200	0	running	134	$12,705
11	14	44	Sterling Marlin	Hagan Racing	Oldsmobile	200	0	running	130	$9,750
12	3	25	Ken Schrader	Hendrick Motorsports	Chevrolet	200	1	running	132	$11,695
13	20	11	Terry Labonte	Junior Johnson & Associates	Chevrolet	199	1	running	129	$12,190
14	25	97	Rodney Combs	Winkle Motorsports	Buick	199	0	running	121	$4,860
15	21	90	Benny Parsons	Donlavey Racing	Ford	199	0	running	118	$8,935
16	10	26	Ricky Rudd	King Racing	Buick	198	3	engine	120	$7,895
17	15	17	Darrell Waltrip	Hendrick Motorsports	Chevrolet	198	1	running	117	$11,085
18	35	29	Cale Yarborough	Cale Yarborough Motorsports	Oldsmobile	198	0	running	109	$5,175
19	36	89	Jim Sauter	Mueller Brothers Racing	Pontiac	198	0	running	106	$3,665
20	13	55	Phil Parsons	Jackson Bros. Motorsports	Oldsmobile	198	0	running	103	$7,205
21	27	33	Harry Gant	Mach 1 Racing	Chevrolet	197	0	running	100	$6,320
22	18	71	Dave Marcis	Marcis Auto Racing	Chevrolet	197	0	running	97	$6,160
23	12	12	Mike Alexander	Stavola Brothers Racing	Buick	197	0	running	94	$10,075
24	29	23	Eddie Bierschwale	B&B Racing	Oldsmobile	197	0	running	91	$2,965
25	37	10	Ken Bouchard (R)	Whitcomb Racing	Ford	196	0	running	88	$3,710
26	42	98	Brad Noffsinger (R)	Curb Racing	Buick	196	0	running	85	$3,030
27	34	19	Chad Little	Little Racing	Ford	195	0	running	82	$2,725
28	38	36	H. B. Bailey	Bailey Racing	Pontiac	195	0	running	79	$2,670
29	5	3	Dale Earnhardt	Richard Childress Racing	Chevrolet	194	39	running	81	$14,315
30	33	96	Dana Patten	Patten Racing	Buick	193	0	running	73	$2,535
31	32	01	Mickey Gibbs	Gibbs Racing	Ford	186	0	running	70	$2,490
32	26	6	Mark Martin	Roush Racing	Ford	162	0	engine	67	$3,295
33	40	2	Ernie Irvan (R)	U.S. Racing	Pontiac	157	0	engine	64	$2,400
34	17	68	Derrike Cope	Testa Racing	Ford	127	0	engine	61	$5,080
35	41	31	Donnie Allison	Bob Clark Motorsports	Oldsmobile	114	0	engine	58	$3,000
36	8	7	Alan Kulwicki	AK Racing	Ford	104	0	engine	55	$4,955
37	39	8	Bobby Hillin Jr.	Stavola Brothers Racing	Buick	94	0	engine	52	$4,915
38	30	52	Jimmy Means	Jimmy Means Racing	Pontiac	72	0	spindle	49	$4,870
39	24	43	Richard Petty	Petty Enterprises	Pontiac	68	0	distributor	46	$4,825
40	19	75	Neil Bonnett	RahMoc Enterprises	Pontiac	51	0	engine	43	$9,210
41	11	1	Dale Jarrett	Ellington Racing	Buick	50	0	oil pan	40	$2,210
42	31	50	Greg Sacks	Dingman Brothers Racing	Pontiac	21	0	ignition	37	$2,710
Failed to qualify
43		51	David Simko	Simko Racing	Pontiac					
44		40	Ben Hess	Hess Racing	Oldsmobile					
45		80	Jimmy Horton (R)	S&H Racing	Ford					
46		67	Ron Esau	Arrington Racing	Ford					
47		95	Slick Johnson	Sadler Brothers Racing	Chevrolet					
48		38	Mike Laws	ProStar Motorsports	Oldsmobile					
49		70	J. D. McDuffie	McDuffie Racing	Pontiac					
50		06	Lee Raymond	Coyle Racing	Chevrolet					
51		07	Larry Moyer	Stark Racing	Pontiac					
Official race results

== Standings after the race ==
Drivers' Championship standings

	Pos	Driver	Points
	1	Rusty Wallace	2,873
	2	Bill Elliott	2,852 (-21)
	3	Dale Earnhardt	2,716 (-157)
	4	Ken Schrader	2,602 (–271)
	5	Terry Labonte	2,552 (–321)
	6	Geoff Bodine	2,470 (–403)
1	7	Sterling Marlin	2,417 (–456)
1	8	Phil Parsons	2,405 (–468)
	9	Darrell Waltrip	2,353 (–520)
	10	Bobby Hillin Jr.	2,235 (–638)
Official driver's standings

- Note: Only the first 10 positions are included for the driver standings.

Previous race: 1988 The Budweiser at The Glen	NASCAR Winston Cup Series; 1988 season	Next race: 1988 Busch 500
