= Thomas C. Marshall Jr. =

American philanthropist (died 2019)

Thomas C. Marshall Jr
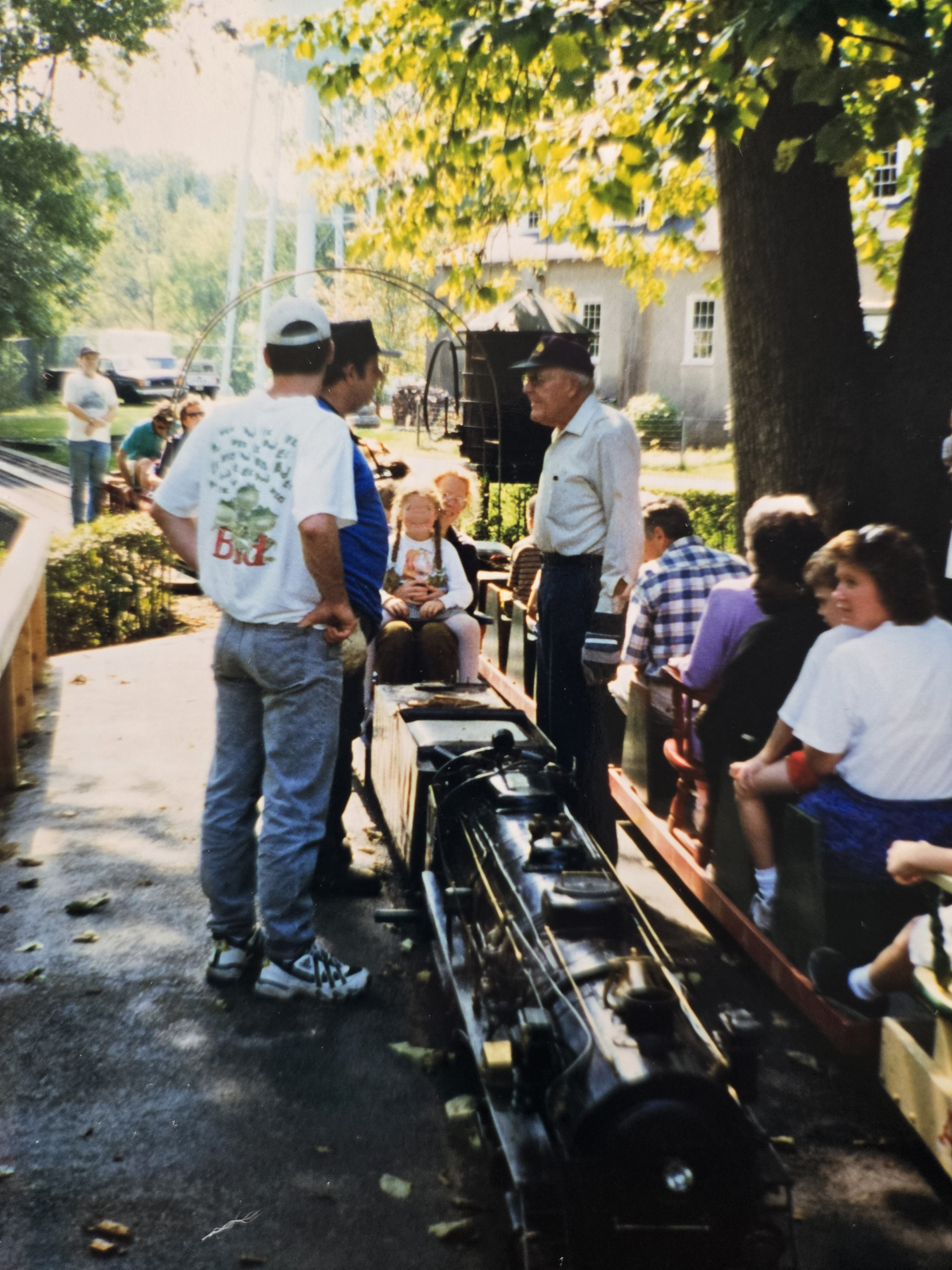
- Thomas Marshall in black baseball cap in 1990s
- Died: February 12, 2019; Yorklyn, Delaware
- Known for: Stanley Steamer Car Collection and Philanthropy
- Spouse: Ruth Pierson Marshall

Thomas C. Marshall Jr. (February 12, 2019) was a philanthropist, historian, antique car collector and one of the world's top authorities on Stanley Steamer automobiles in Yorklyn, Delaware. Prior to his death, his home and adjoining land was created into the Auburn Valley State Park.

== Early life ==
Marshall Jr was born to T. Clarence Marshall and Esther Shallcross Marshall, and spent the first eighty-four years living in Yorklyn at the Victorian-era mansion built by his grandparents in 1897. He attended Wilmington Friends School and graduated in 1941, then Mercersburg Academy before attending M.I.T. between 1942 and 1943. He served in the US Army from 1942 until 1946 as a weather forecaster in New Mexico before joining a B-24 flight crew as an aerial weather observer in the Western Pacific. While a part of the crew he flew over the USS Missouri in the Tokyo Harbor the day of the surrender ceremony that ended World War II.

== Stanley Steamer collection ==
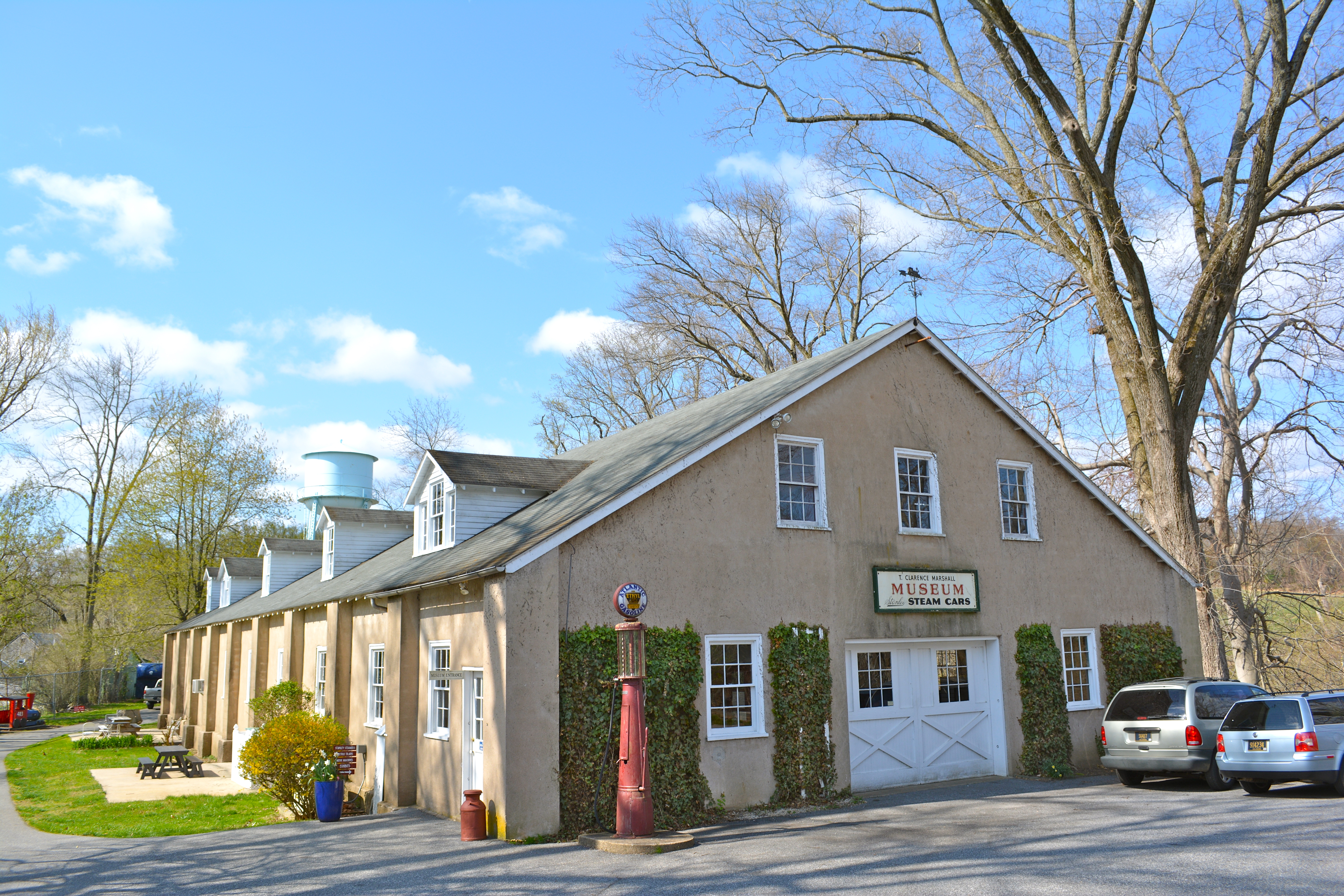
Exterior of Marshall Steam Museum located behind the mansion

Marshall Jr. inherited his fathers car collection, which began in 1910 when his father was an authorized dealer; and the first in Delaware, for the company based in Newton, Massachusetts. While the collection peaked at forty cars, of which 24 were Steamers, Marshall Jr inherited 34 vehicles and gradually reduced that number to fifteen Steamers, two Packards and one early electric car.

He drove one of the vehicles a 30-horsepower 1912 Stanley Steamer touring car on four transcontinental tours. One spanned 8,328 miles and visited Montreal, Canada and Tijuana, Mexico before returning to Yorklyn, Delaware which he completed in 1972. The family opened the collection and the surrounding property to the public in the 1970s, along with the 1/8 scale steam train line that Marshall Jr had installed on the property.

== Philanthropy ==
He served on many non-profit and philanthropy based boards including Mercersburg Academy, Historic Red Clay Valley, the Friends of Old Drawyers and the Red Clay Valley Association. As a Quaker, Marshall Jr served with multiple Quaker organizations such as Hockessin Friends Meeting and the Friends Home in Kennett Square, Pennsylvania.

He was a founder of Historic Red Clay Valley, Inc., the non-profit organization that operates the Wilmington & Western Railroad, a historic steam and diesel powered tourist train line in Wilmington, Delaware and served as its first President and General Manager from 1960 until 1971 and continued as a volunteer and board member. He had presented the idea of the line in 1959 and purchased the first steam locomotive that the organization would use.

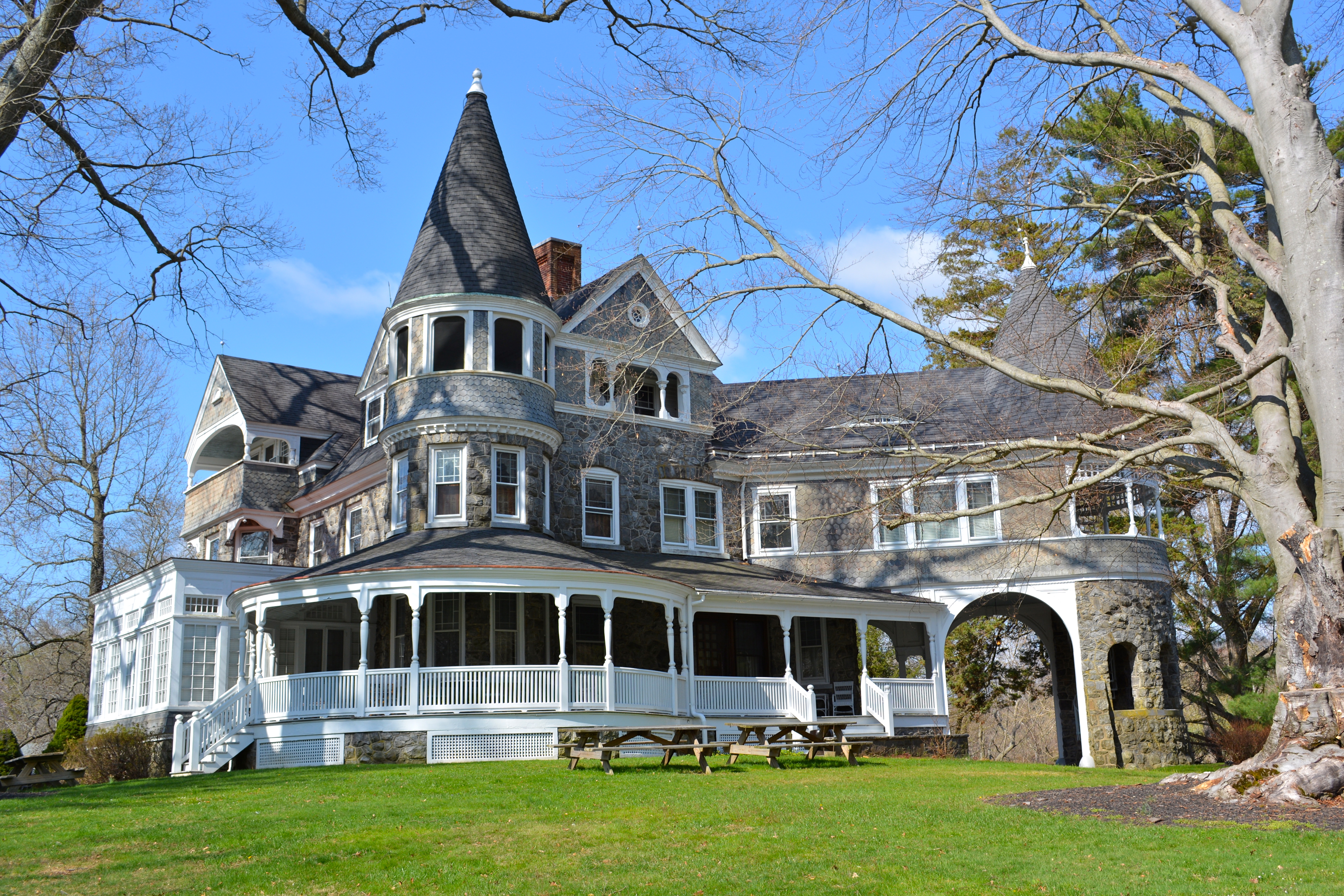
Mansion of Israel Marshall that was donated to the state

In 2008, he and his wife donated the mansion and four acres around it to the state of Delaware when they moved to a senior community center. The home and acreage was named the Auburn Valley State Park and an additional 300 acres was purchased to protect the rural setting of the land. Also a part of the preserve is the Stanley steam car collection housed in the T. Clarence Marshall Steam Museum. The museum building is leased to the Friends of Auburn Heights a non-profit organization that owns, maintains, and operates the largest collection of Stanley Steamer automobiles in the world. The Friends of Auburn Heights also own and operate the Auburn Valley Railroad, a live-steam railroad that encircles the Auburn Heights mansion, Marshall Steam Museum, and other out buildings and includes a tunnel, trestle, and turntable.

== Personal life ==
Prior to his death in 2019, Marshall Jr was married to his wife Ruth Pierson Marshall for thirty-three and a half years. His wife Ruth, passed in September 2026. He founded and operated Marshall & Burton Travel Associates, renamed Marshall and Greenplate, from 1949 to 1963, and operated at least two Holiday Inn's in Wilmington, Delaware for about thirty years between 1961 and 1997. Marshall Jr was an avid trap shooter and won the Delaware State Trapshooting championship nine times between 1939 and 1950 and was the runner-up for the Amateur Trapshooting Championship of America in 1948.

Prior to his death about 1,100 images of Marshall Jr, his family, property and surrounding area were donated to the Hagley Museum and Library in Wilmington, Delaware. The majority of the images were digitalized and viewable on the museum's digital archive website.
