= Walnut Green School =

- U.S. National Register of Historic Places
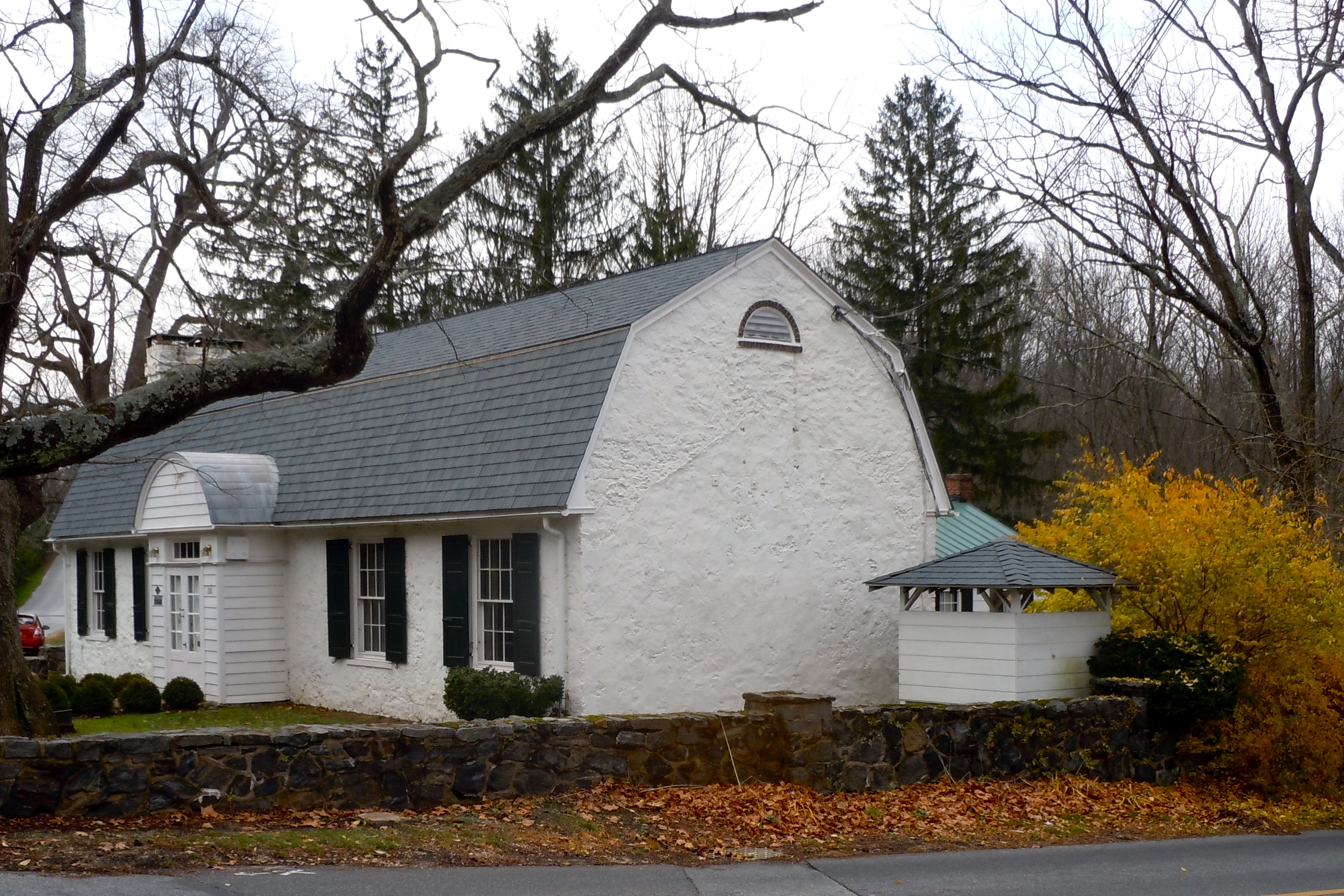
- Walnut Green School, November 2011

- Location within Delaware Location within the United States
- Location: Junction of Delaware Route 82 and Owl's Nest Rd., Greenville, Delaware
- Coordinates: 39.79359°N 75.62533°W
- Area: less than one acre
- Built: 1919-1924
- Architectural style: Colonial Revival
- NRHP reference No.: 94001014
- Added to NRHP: August 19, 1994

Walnut Green School, also known as District School Number 25, is a historic one-room school building located at Greenville, New Castle County, Delaware. It was founded in 1808 and in 1924 was said to be the oldest schoolhouse in the state. It is a one-story, five-bay, rectangular, gambrel-roofed, white-stuccoed stone building in the Colonial Revival style. The school building dates to the late-18th century, but was expanded and remodeled in 1918–1924. The school closed in 1947, because parents wanted their children to go to the AI duPont school district.

It was listed on the National Register of Historic Places in 1994.
