= J. Mason Farm =

- U.S. National Register of Historic Places
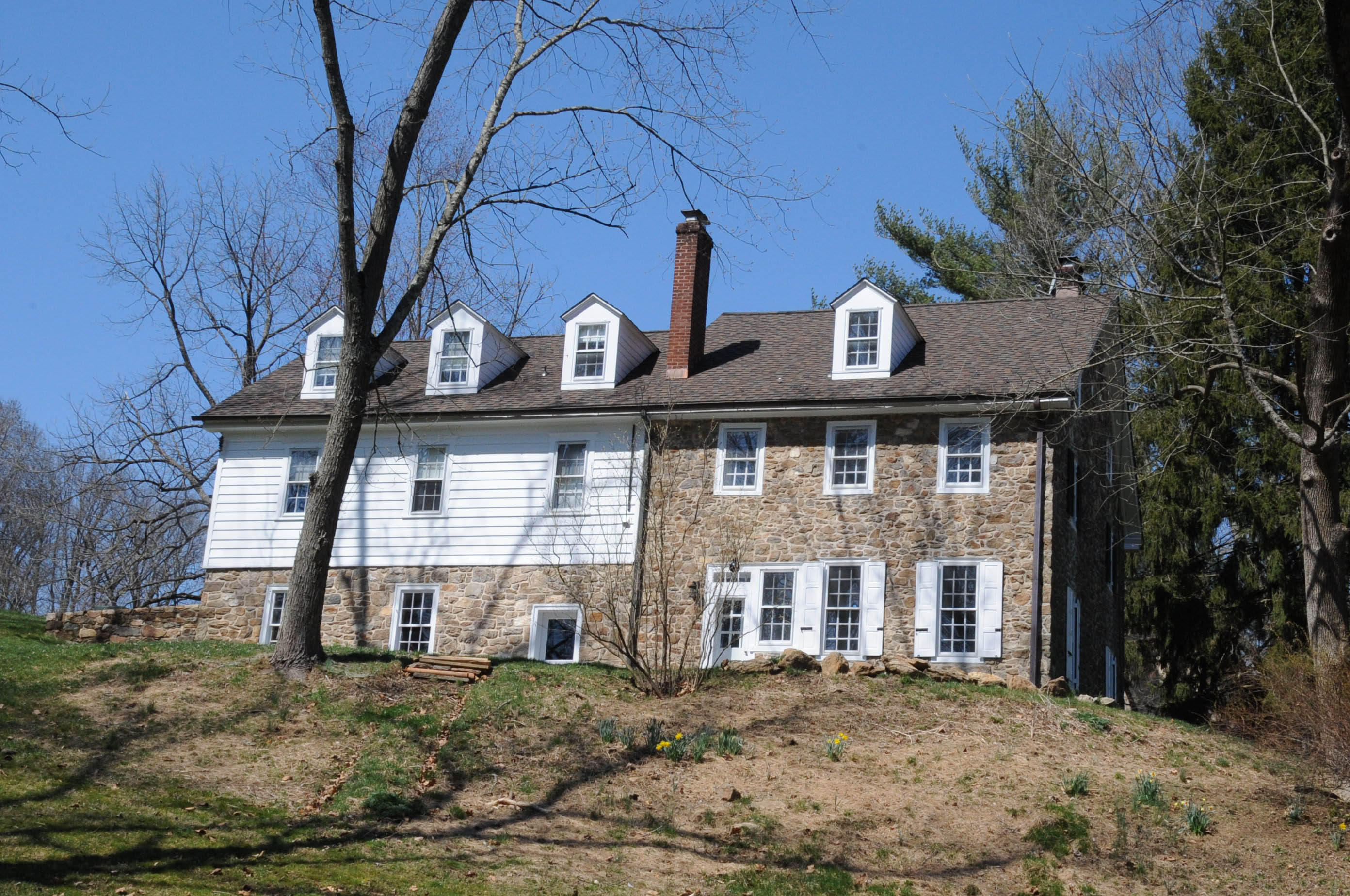
- STONE PORTION WAS BUILT IN 1827 AND THE FRAME PORTION WAS ADDED MUCH LATER IN THE EARLY 20TH CENTURY

- Location within Delaware Location within the United States
- Location: 2772 Creek Road, near Ashland, Delaware
- Coordinates: 39.798023°N 75.651213°W
- Area: 12.5 acres (5.1 ha)
- Built: 1827
- Architectural style: Bi-level barn
- MPS: Agricultural Buildings and Complexes in Mill Creek Hundred, 1800-1840 TR
- NRHP reference No.: 86003091
- Added to NRHP: November 13, 1986

J. Mason Farm is a historic farm located near Ashland, New Castle County, Delaware. The property includes two contributing buildings. They are a stone house (1827) and a stone and frame bank barn (c. 1827). The house is a two-story, gable-roofed, fieldstone structure with a two-story, three-bay, frame wing that may have been added in the 1930s or 1940s. The barn walls are of uncoursed fieldstone finished with a pebbled stucco.

In the 20th century, it became part of Ashland Farm, a Du Pont estate. It was added to the National Register of Historic Places in 1986.
