= Auburn Valley State Park =

State park in Yorklyn, Delaware, US

Auburn Valley State Parks
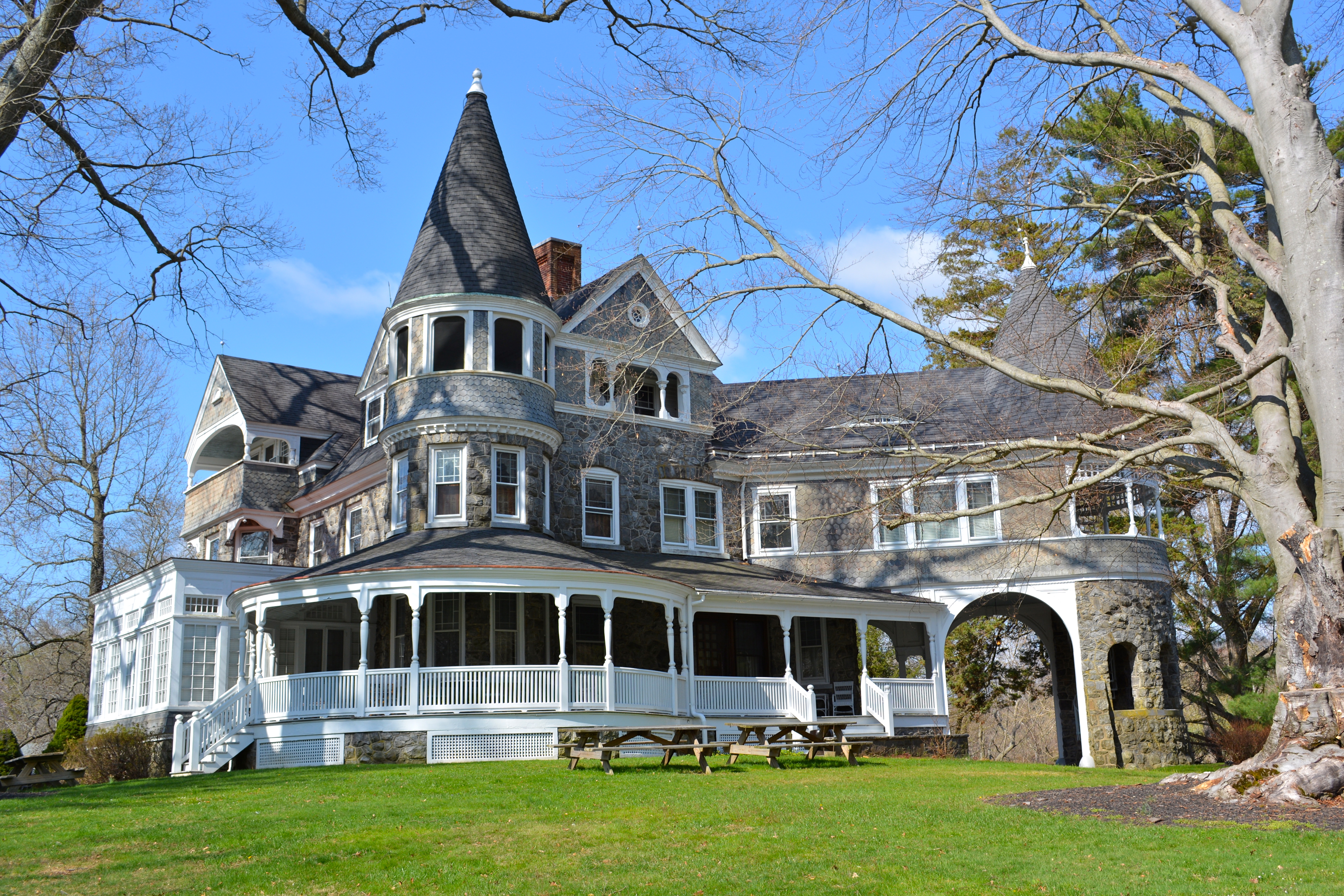
- Israel Marshall's Home, Auburn Heights

- Location within Delaware Location within the United States
- Location: New Castle County, Delaware, United States
- Coordinates: 39°48′33″N 75°40′47″W
- Area: 471.72 acres (190.90 ha)
- Established: 2018
- Administrator: Delaware Department of Natural Resources and Environmental Control
- Website: Official website

Auburn Valley State Park (formerly Auburn Heights Preserve) is a 471-acre (191 ha) public recreation and historic preservation area located in Yorklyn, Delaware, United States. The state park preserves the former home and estate of the Marshall family as well as portions of the family's former mills alongside the Red Clay Creek and additional land purchased by the state. The preserve contains 4 miles (6.4 km) of trails for walking and biking, including a 1.2 mile paved loop. The state owns conservation easements on 160 acres of privately owned land adjacent to the park to help maintain the park's rural character.

The park also features a large collection of operational steam cars and a miniature coal-powered train that runs on tracks encircling the estate. The mansion, mills, and steam museum were added to the National Register of Historic Places in 1980 as the Auburn Mills Historic District.

== Park history ==
Interest in preserving land near the Red Clay Creek was first expressed to the state by local residents and conservation groups in 2000. With the nearby National Vulcanized Fiber company looking to downsize, there was a general agreement among advocates that an opportunity for conservation had presented itself. Tom Marshall, the owner of a local estate, began donating portions of his land to the Delaware Nature Society for conservation purposes. The state began acquiring land for a preserve in 2002, with a purchase of 104 acres of NVF land for $3 million and a purchase of 65 acres of Marshall's old land from the Delaware Nature Society for $2.3 million.

Additional purchases of 19 acres were made in 2005, bringing the preserve's total size to almost 200 acres. It was made a state park in 2008.

After NVF declared bankruptcy, the state purchased 42 of the company's 119 acres of land, bringing the main portion of the preserve to a total of 234 acres. The state also acquired conservation easements on much of the remaining NVF land and began working with its purchasing developer to establish a plan which would maintain open space, build a network of trails through the valley, and help revitalize the mill town by adaptive reuse of historic structures.

On November 9, 2018, Auburn Heights Preserve was renamed and dedicated as Auburn Valley State Park, with Governor John Carney, U.S. Senator Tom Carper, DNREC Secretary Shawn M. Garvin, and other state and local officials in attendance at a ribbon-cutting ceremony.

=== Auburn Heights Mansion ===
The Auburn Heights Mansion was built in 1897 by Israel Marshall, the descendant of a family of local farmers that immigrated to the United States in the seventeenth century. In 1890, Israel and his brother, T. Elwood Marshall, purchased the nearby mill. The home was built in a Victorian style, and is situated on a large hill so that it overlooks the mill complex, and the town of Yorklyn, below. The fully furnished home and 4 acres of surrounding land were donated to the state in 2008 by Tom Marshall, the grandson of Israel Marshall. The park provides tours in which visitors can learn about the family as well as the industrial history of the region.

=== Oversee Farm ===
The Oversee Farm is a separate unit of the park that is nearby, but not connected to the main portion of Auburn Heights Preserve. The farm is the former estate of Eleanor Marshall Reynolds, Tom Marshall's cousin. Reynolds purchased the farm in 1945, intending to see it preserved for future generations. Contained within the farm property are stretches of forest, freshwater marshes, open fields, and scenic views of Red Clay Creek. Following her death in 2003, Reynolds' son Warren sold the 125 acre farm to The Nature Conservancy in order to see it preserved, and the conservancy worked with the state to transition the farm to the ownership of the state's parks department.

Plans call for the farm to be connected to the main unit of the preserve through the park's network of trails by passing through privately owned land on which the state owns conservation easements.

== Marshall Steam Museum ==
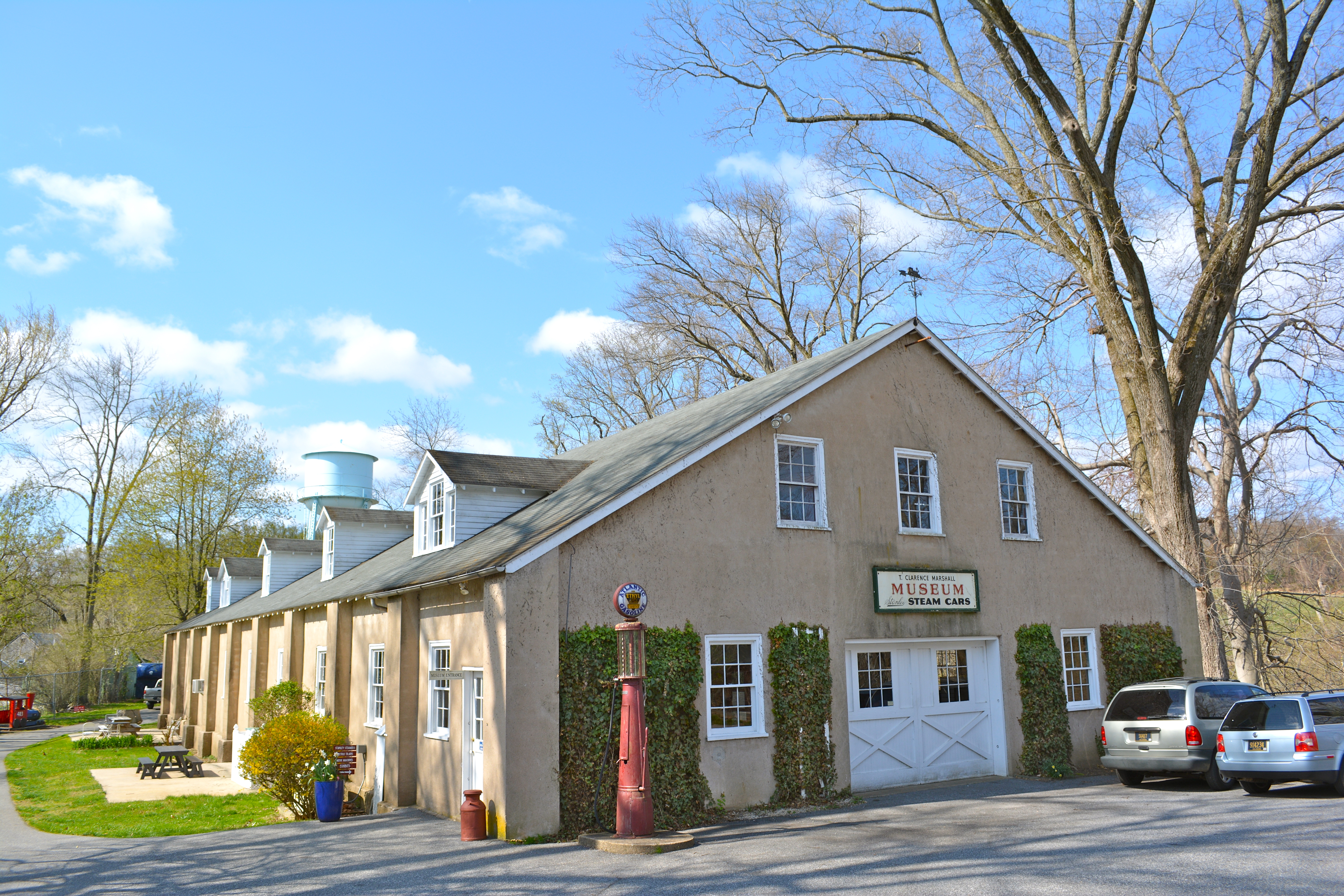
Marshall Steam Museum

T. Clarence Marshall, the youngest son of Israel Marshall and the father of Thomas Marshall, was fascinated by the steam power that operated the family's mills. He became a licensed dealer for Stanley Motor Carriage Company and began acquiring a personal collection of steam automobiles. The collection was first opened to the public in the 1970s. Following its donation in 2008 by Tom Marshall, the collection is owned by the nonprofit Friends of Auburn Heights Preserve which operates the park in partnership with the state. The collection is housed in the Auburn Heights carriage house, where a team of volunteers maintains the vehicles so that they remain fully operational. Included in the collection are 15 Stanley cars and several steam and electric cars from other manufacturers. The Museum's collection also includes a 1/8-size steam locomotive that runs on tracks around the estate called the Auburn Valley Railroad.

Visitors are able to view the collection, and on certain days rides on the cars and trains are offered to the general public. The park has a field trip program in which visiting students can learn about the history of transportation technology and steam power.

== Historic district ==
- Auburn Mills Historic District
- U.S. National Register of Historic Places
- U.S. Historic district
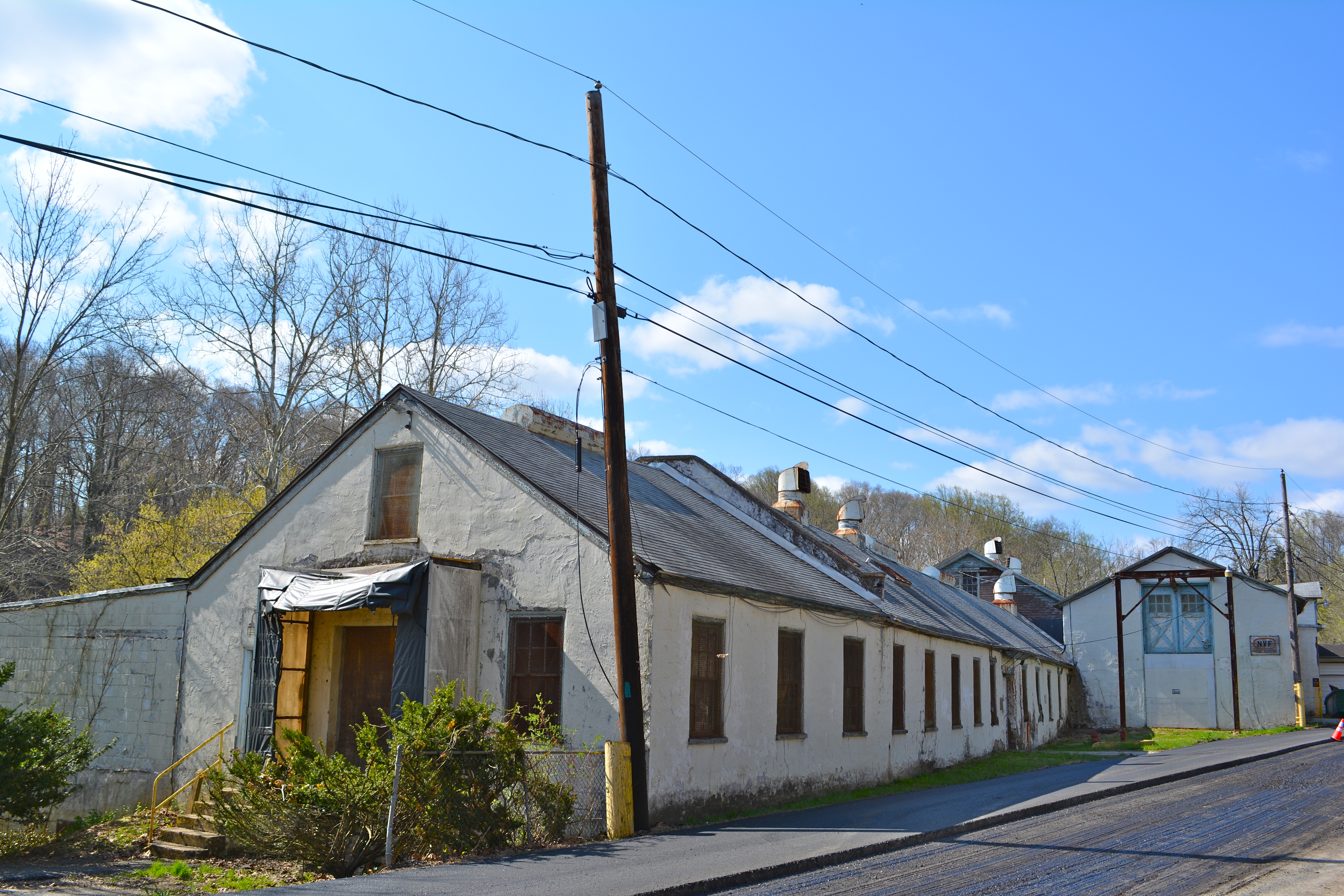
- Auburn Mill, used to make paper
- Location: West of Yorklyn on Delaware Route 82 and Benge Road, Yorklyn, Delaware
- Coordinates: 39°48′28″N 75°40′49″W
- Area: 17 acres (6.9 ha)
- Built: 1813
- Architectural style: Queen Anne, Romanesque
- NRHP reference No.: 80000939
- Added to NRHP: January 22, 1980

Within the park is the Auburn Mills Historic District, a national historic district with 9 contributing buildings, 4 contributing sites, and 1 contributing structure that were mostly between 1890 and 1910 and related to the Auburn Mill. The district contains industrial, commercial, and domestic structures. They include the Horatio Gates Garrett House, Israel Marshall House (1897), The "Bank" worker's row house, Auburn Store/NVP Office, Frame Workers' Housing Site, Insulite Mill (1900), Blacksmith's Shop Site, Auburn Mill, Utility Shed, and Trolley Line Trestle Piers. It was added to the National Register of Historic Places in 1980.

== Gallery ==
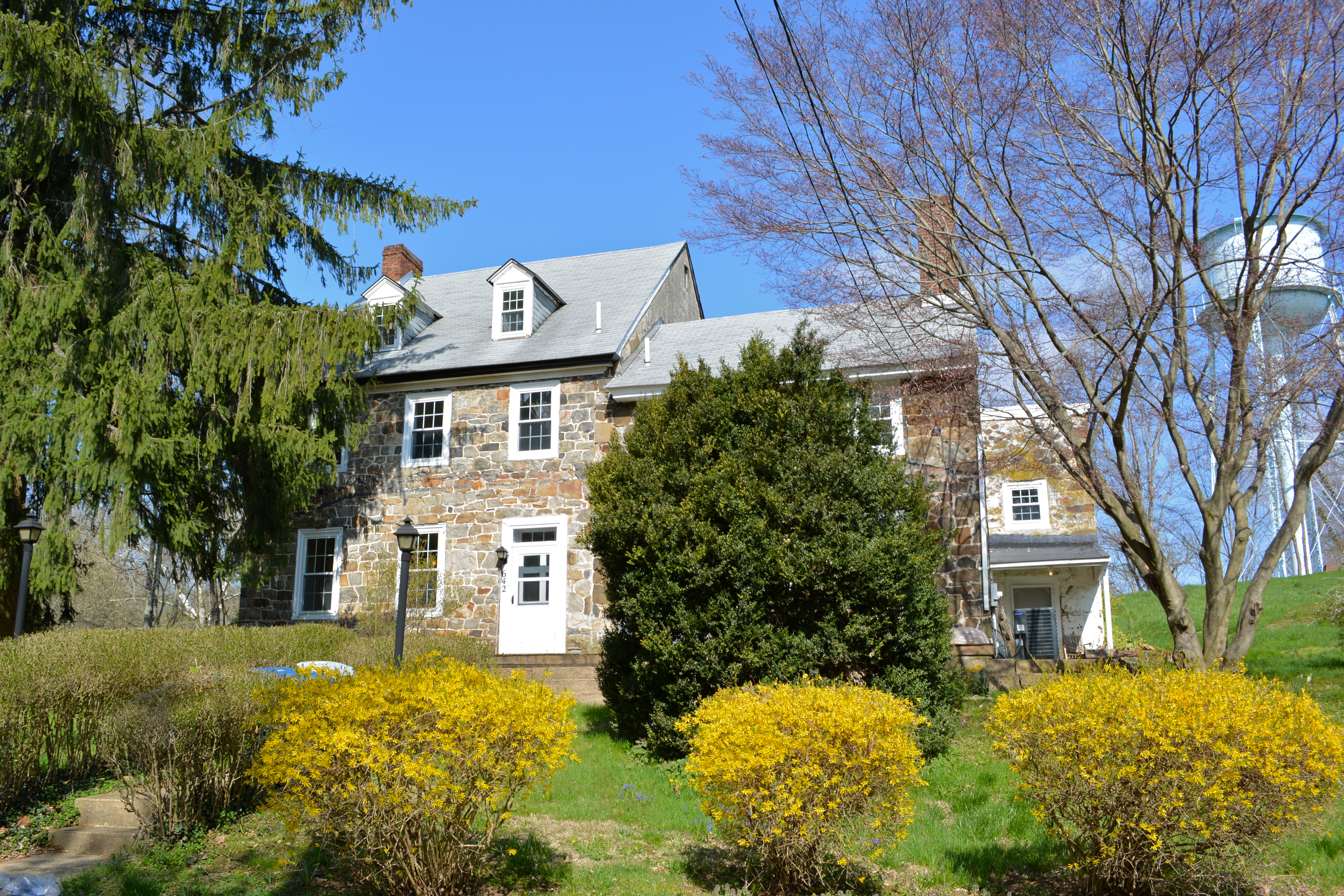
Garrett House

Israel Marshall House

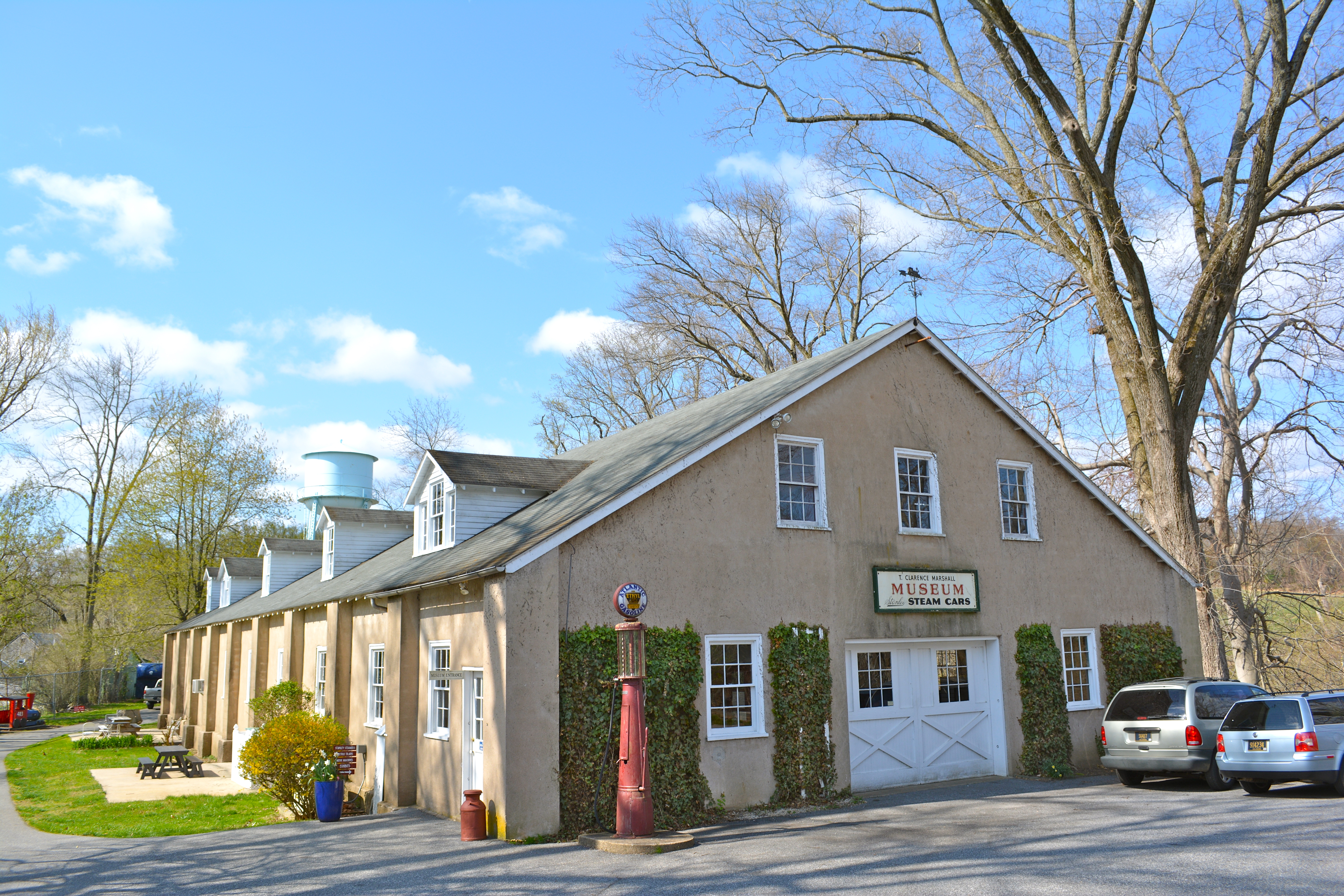
Steam car museum behind the Marshall House
