= Kodiak tobacco =

Brand of dipping tobacco

Kodiak
- Product type: Dipping tobacco
- Current owner: Reynolds American
- Produced by: American Snuff Co.
- Country: United States
- Introduced: 1980; 46 years ago
- Previous owners: Conwood Company

Kodiak is an American brand of dipping tobacco (moist snuff) made by the American Snuff Company, which also makes Grizzly and Levi Garrett. American Snuff is a subsidiary of Reynolds American and, through it, British American Tobacco. The brand was introduced by Conwood in 1980, and the company sells it as its premium moist snuff brand. Kodiak sponsored NASCAR teams from the late 1980s to 2001, including the No. 27 Blue Max Racing Pontiac that Rusty Wallace drove to the 1989 Winston Cup championship.

== History ==
Kodiak was introduced in 1980 by the Memphis-based Conwood Company. Reynolds American (RAI) bought Conwood on May 31, 2006, for about $3.5 billion. On January 1, 2010, Conwood returned to its historical name, American Snuff Company; at the time its brands included Kodiak, Grizzly and Levi Garrett. In its annual report for 2010, RAI placed Kodiak in American Snuff's premium category and named it one of the company's two "investment brands", with Grizzly in the price-value category. British American Tobacco completed its acquisition of Reynolds American on July 25, 2017.

== Products ==
Conwood marketed Kodiak in three flavors, Wintergreen, Mint (formerly Ice) and Straight, each with a Kodiak bear on the lid. The range has since included Natural longcut, Extra Longcut Natural, fine-cut snuff and wintergreen pouches, which hold the tobacco in a small porous bag.

=== Nicotine content ===
In a 1999 study of six U.S. moist snuff products bought in Florida, the Centers for Disease Control and Prevention found that Kodiak Wintergreen had the highest pH of the group, at 8.35. A higher pH leaves more of the nicotine in its free (unprotonated) form, which the mouth absorbs more readily. Kodiak Wintergreen measured 8.56 mg of total nicotine per gram, third-highest of the six, and 5.83 mg/g of free nicotine. At about 68 percent of its total nicotine, its share of free nicotine was the highest in the study.

=== 2023 recall ===
On November 19, 2023, American Snuff Company voluntarily recalled certain lots of Kodiak Premium Wintergreen Longcut after finding that the tobacco could contain small pieces of metal. The metal came from parts of the manufacturing equipment rubbing against each other at the company's plant in Clarksville, Tennessee. The affected cans had been shipped to retailers in 18 states. The company said it had received no complaints or reports of injury.

== Motorsports sponsorship ==
Kodiak was a NASCAR Winston Cup sponsor from 1987 to 2001. Its sister brand Levi Garrett also sponsored NASCAR teams.

=== Blue Max Racing ===
Kodiak replaced Alugard as the sponsor of Raymond Beadle's Blue Max Racing team in 1987. Rusty Wallace drove the team's No. 27 Kodiak Pontiac and won races in it, including the Champion Spark Plug 400 at Michigan International Speedway in August 1989. Wallace and Beadle won the 1989 championship by 12 points over Dale Earnhardt. The Motorsports Hall of Fame of America has cited Beadle's success in bringing in national sponsors such as Kodiak.

=== Hendrick Motorsports ===
Kodiak later sponsored Ken Schrader's No. 25 Chevrolet at Hendrick Motorsports, including during the 1994 season.

=== Larry Hedrick Motorsports ===
Kodiak sponsored the No. 41 Chevrolet of Larry Hedrick Motorsports. Ricky Craven drove the car in 1995, when he was the series' Rookie of the Year, and was still driving it in 1996, when Hedrick signed Steve Grissom to take over the Kodiak car for 1997. Grissom and Hedrick ended their contract in September 1998.

=== Melling Racing ===
From 2000, Kodiak sponsored Melling Racing's No. 9 car, driven by Stacy Compton. The team ran a Ford in 2000 before switching to Dodge for 2001. Kodiak left the team after the 2001 season.

=== Throwback schemes ===
At the 2019 Southern 500 at Darlington Raceway, Kyle Larson drove a Chip Ganassi Racing No. 42 Chevrolet painted like Craven's 1995 Kodiak car. The car carried Clover Network sponsorship rather than Kodiak. At Darlington in 2025, Chase Elliott's Hendrick No. 9 Chevrolet ran a throwback scheme based on Schrader's 1994 Kodiak car.

== See also ==
- Snus
