= Levi Garrett =

Company

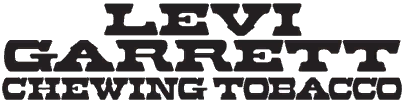
- Product type: Chewing tobacco
- Current owner: Reynolds American
- Produced by: American Snuff Co.
- Introduced: 1974; 52 years ago

Levi Garrett is a brand of loose-leaf chewing tobacco produced by the American Snuff Company. Levi Garrett has a noticeably sweet flavour, with a larger cut than America's Best Chew, Beech-Nut, and other brands of loose-leaf chewing tobacco.

== History ==
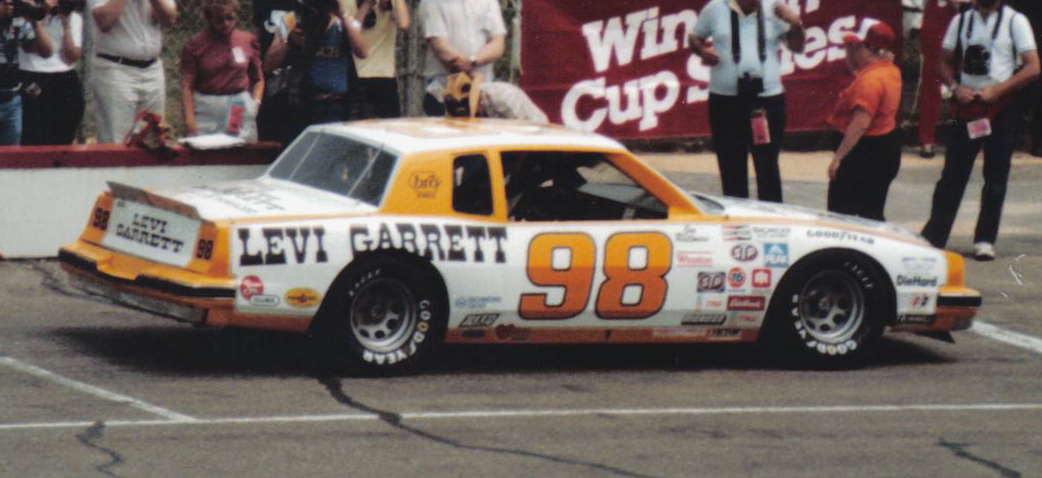
Race car sponsored by Levi Garrett in 1983

The brand Levi Garrett was introduced on the US market in 1974 by Conwood Corporation of Tennessee (later acquired by Dalfort, now called the American Snuff Company). By 1981, it was already second in the US chewing tobacco market. Levi Garrett became known for their sponsorship of various teams in the then NASCAR Winston Cup Series. Most notably, the Hendrick Motorsports #5 driven by Geoff Bodine and Ricky Rudd.

=== Origin of name ===
The name Levi Garrett is derived from an individual named Levi Garrett who lived in the 1800s and was part of the Garrett family, which started the Garrett Snuff Mill in the Garrett Snuff Mills Historic District in Yorklyn, Delaware. A predecessor company to the American Snuff Company was called Levi Garrett and Sons.
