= Garrett Snuff Mill =

- U.S. National Register of Historic Places
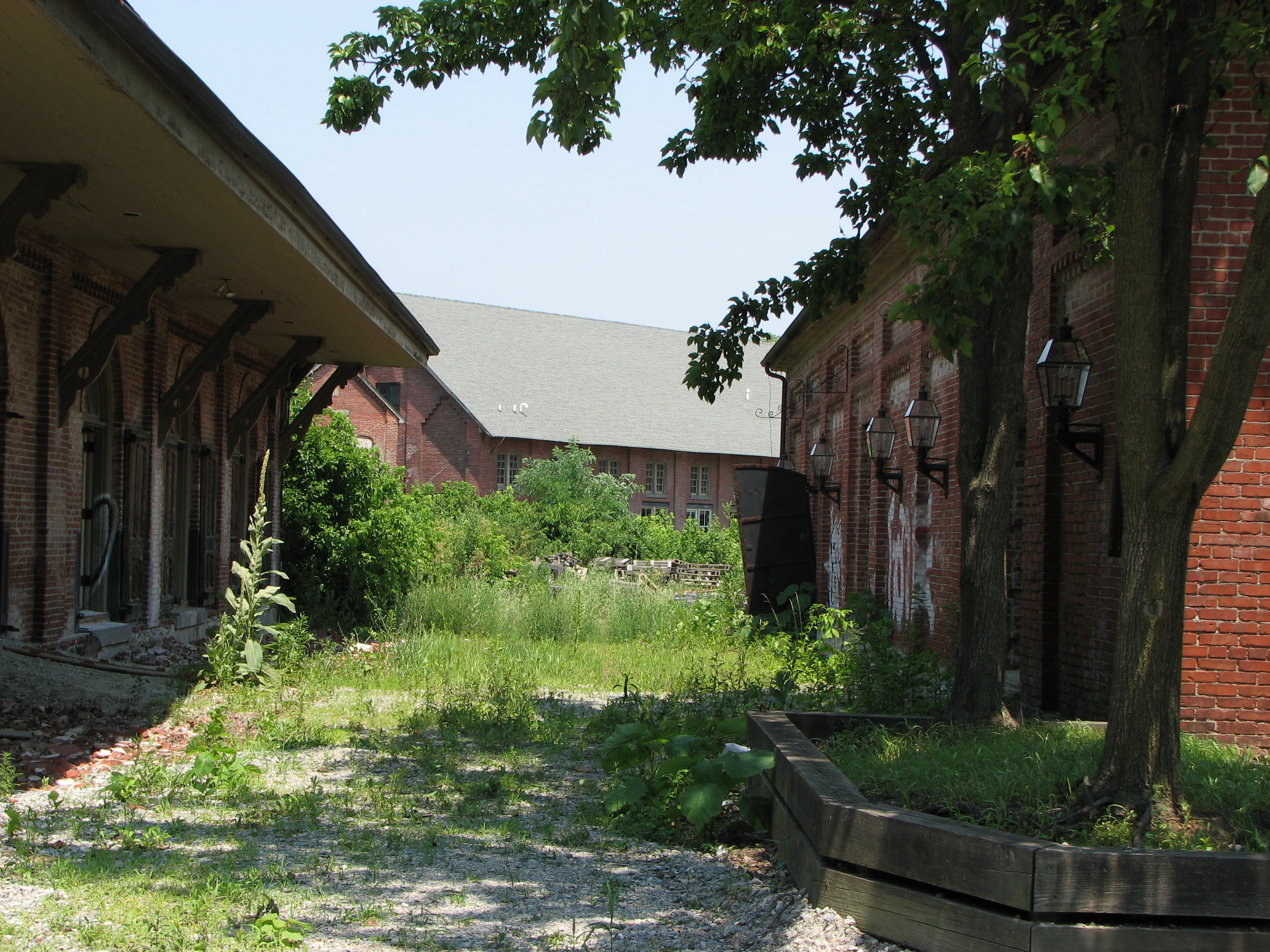
- Yorklyn Snuff Mill Warehouses, July 2008

- Location within Delaware Location within the United States
- Location: Jct. Delaware Route 82 and Yorklyn Rd., Yorklyn, Delaware
- Coordinates: 39°48′31″N 75°40′26″W
- Area: 17 acres (6.9 ha)
- Built: 1846-1901
- NRHP reference No.: 78000913
- Added to NRHP: May 22, 1978

Garrett Snuff Mill, also known as the George W. Helme Company, is a historic snuff tobacco mill complex located at Yorklyn, New Castle County, Delaware. The complex includes 14 contributing buildings built between 1846 and 1901. The buildings are architecturally unified as most are built of brick, with the two earliest mills constructed of stone. The Garrett family introduced the manufacture of snuff to Delaware. The complex housed a snuff manufacturing operation until 1954.

It was listed on the National Register of Historic Places in 1978. The buildings were later incorporated into the Garrett Snuff Mills Historic District, which was listed on the National Register of Historic Places in 1980..

== History ==
=== Garrett family ===
In the early 1730s, John Garrett I built several mills on the banks of Red Clay Creek in Yorklyn, Delaware, including a grist mill. He originally had three partners, but bought them out with the profits from the mill. His son and later descendants took over the business. The name changed as different family members took over the business. It was renamed to Levi Garrett and Sons when his son and grandsons took over, and then to Willam E. Garrett Company, and then William E. Garrett and Sons.

When John Garrett died in 1757, the mill passed onto his son, Captain John Garrett II, who also built a snuff mill. John Garrett II's first product was ''Garrett Scotch Snuff','' which product received the seventh trademark in the United States, in 1870.

In 1803, John Garrett II's sons, Levi and Horatio, took over the company. Horatio took the grist mill and Levi was given the snuff mill.

In 1819, one of Levi's employees obtained a patent for a device to save labor in making snuff and Levi obtained a license to use the product, allowing him to gain an advantage on his competitors. He opened a store in Philadelphia to sell their snuff and other tobacco products, and his two sons, George and William, joined the company. In 1824, the company was renamed to ''Levi Garrett & Sons.''

In 1833, Levi died and George sold his shared to William.

In 1846 William built Mill #1, which was a large stone structure and the oldest extant structure on the site. It was rebuilt in 1858 after sustaining fire damage.

Mill 4 was constructed three years later, in 1849. This was known as ''Mill 4'' and not ''Mill 2'' as the numbering system was established at a later point. This mill was enlarged in 1884.

In 1857, William's sons, William Jr. and Walter, joined the company, and the company was renamed to ''W.E. Garrett & Sons.'' The second mill was built in 1860.

On November 10, 1877, a fire burned the entire business down, causing $50,000 to $75,000 in damage. The mill was rebuilt within a year.

A third mill was built in 1884. This is the most architecturally detailed mill at the site.

William E. Garrett Sr. died in 1885. In 1895, upon Walter Garrett's death, and William Garrett Jr. having no interest in continuing to run the business, the company was sold to three of his employees for one dollar. Within three years, this company merged with three other companies to become the Atlantic Snuff Company.

=== Acquisitions ===
James Buchanan Duke, the owner of the American Tobacco Company, acquired the Atlantic Snuff Company in 1900 and it became part of the American Snuff Company, a subsidiary trust of the American Tobacco Company. However, the American Snuff Company lost the mill in 1911, when the American Tobacco Company and its co-defendants were broken up following the Supreme Court of the United States decision in United States v. American Tobacco Co. The George W. Helme Company obtained the Garrett mill after the dissolution of American Tobacco Company. The dissolution resulted in three new snuff companies being created, with George W. Helme Company receiving the Garrett Mill and the American Snuff Company receiving the Garrett Mill trademarks.

=== Closure ===
By the 1950s the Garrett Snuff Mill could no longer compete in the marketplace because of its outdated machinery. The factory in Yorklyn had produced only 2 million pounds of snuff a year after 1945, which only amounted to about 5 percent of the country's total. Its machinery was from the 1880s and Helme did not consider modernization of the equipment. On October 1, 1954, stopped operations, laid off 75 men, scrapped the machinery, and sold all the structures.
