= Martin Condon =

American politician (1857-?)

Portrait of Martin Condon

Martin Condon, born 1857 in Hawkins County, was Knoxville, Tennessee's first Irish Catholic mayor. Prior to becoming mayor, Condon was a wholesale grocery businessman.

== See also ==
- List of mayors of Knoxville, Tennessee
