= Garrett Snuff Mills Historic District =

Historic district in Delaware, United States

- U.S. National Register of Historic Places
- U.S. Historic district
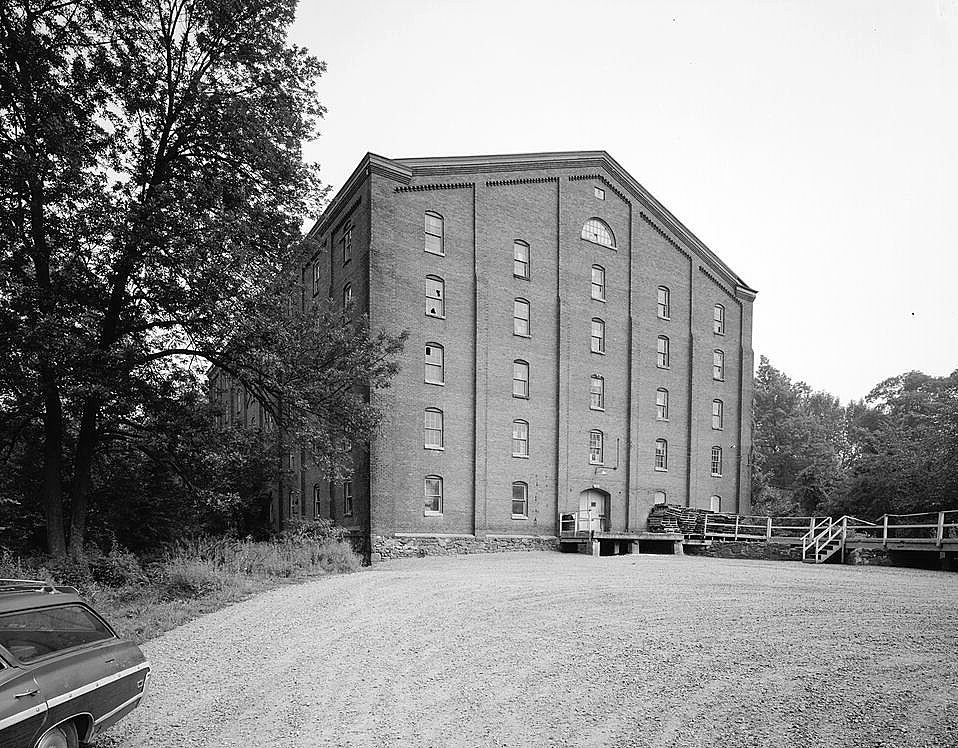
- Garrett Snuff Mill in 1976

- Location within Delaware Location within the United States
- Location: Delaware Route 82 and Yorklyn Rd., Yorklyn, Delaware
- Coordinates: 39.810598°N 75.672435°W
- Area: 58 acres (23 ha)
- Built: 1846
- Architectural style: Late Victorian, Georgian
- NRHP reference No.: 80004486
- Added to NRHP: January 24, 1980

Garrett Snuff Mills Historic District is a national historic district located at Yorklyn, New Castle County, Delaware. The district encompasses 31 contributing buildings, including the 14 buildings previously listed in the Garrett Snuff Mill. The 17 additional buildings are 19th century domestic buildings associated with the mills. They include the mill owner's and supervisor's houses, a late Victorian frame house, and four rows of workers' housing.

It was listed on the National Register of Historic Places in 1980.
