= National Vulcanized Fiber =

American plastic manufacturer (1923–2009)

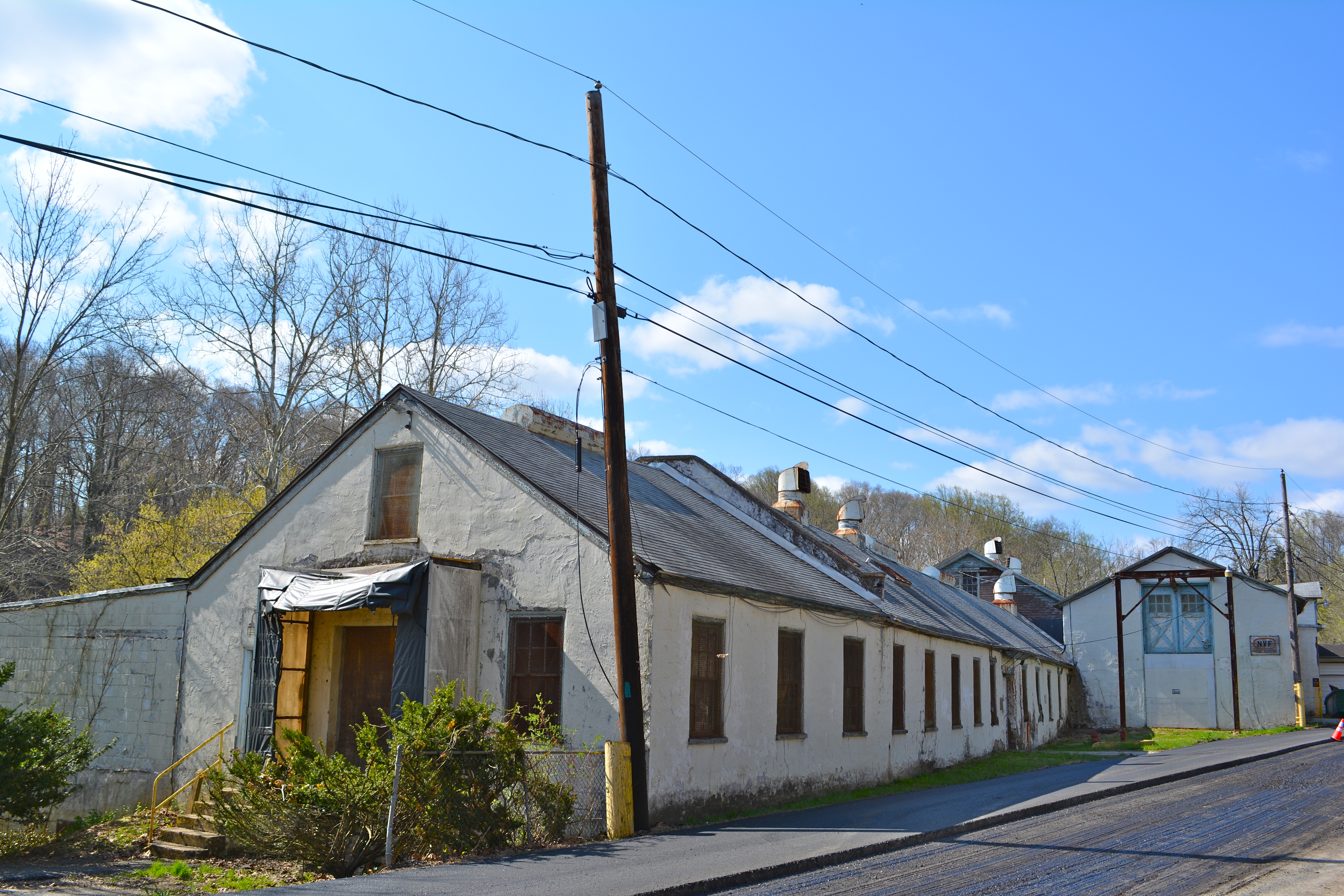
Former NVF paper mill in the Auburn Mills Historic District, near Yorklyn, Delaware.

NVF Company, formerly known as National Vulcanized Fiber, was a private company based in Yorklyn, Delaware. One of its original products, a sheet-like material called Forbon, was commonly used on guitar pickups. NVF also made a product called Yorkite, another vulcanized fibre, that has wood grain printed directly on the material.

At one time, the company generated an estimated $42.2 million in sales and had about 550 employees.

NVF stopped manufacturing Vulcanized Fibre in Yorklyn after a flood in 2003 damaged the equipment. Corporate offices continued to operate until 2009, when they declared bankruptcy and dissolved the company, including the Kennett Square facility which made Industrial Plastic Laminates. At that point, NVF Company ceased to exist.

== History ==
The company was formed by the merger of American Vulcanized Fiber Company, the National Fiber and Insulation Company and the Keystone Fiber Company on January 1, 1923.

Company president Warren Marshall's 1936 salary was included in a list of "highest salaries paid in nation" released in 1938 by a Congressional committee.

In 1946, the company's shares began trading on the New York Stock Exchange.

In the 1990s, the company was controlled by financier Victor Posner.

NVF was involved in a dispute with the city of Holyoke, Massachusetts about unpaid taxes on a paper factory there which was later destroyed by fire.

An NVF facility in Kennett Square, Pennsylvania was found to be contaminated by polychlorinated biphenyls.

A former NVF manufacturing site in Newark, Delaware has been redeveloped by the Commonwealth Group of New Castle, Delaware.
