= Grizzly (tobacco) =

American brand of dipping tobacco

- Product type: Dipping tobacco, nicotine pouch
- Current owner: Reynolds American
- Produced by: American Snuff Co.
- Introduced: 2001; 25 years ago
- Website: mygrizzly.com
- Carcinogenicity: IARC group 1 (smokeless tobacco variants only)

Grizzly is an American brand of dipping tobacco (moist snuff) and nicotine pouches that was introduced in 2001. It is made by the American Snuff Company.

== History ==
Grizzly was first sold in 2001 at lower prices and was originally available in Long Cut Wintergreen (green tin) and Fine Cut Natural (red tin). By the end of 2006, Long Cut Straight (maroon tin), Long Cut Mint (blue tin), Long Cut Natural (silver tin) and Fine Cut Wintergreen (olive tin) were also introduced. Snuff and Wintergreen Pouches were released in 2008, and also began an attempt to change its market position into an upmarket brand. Metal lids were made standard in 2010, replacing the previous all-plastic cans. Wide Cut Wintergreen was released in 2014, Dark Wintergreen Long Cut and Pouches were released in 2015 and Dark Mint long cut and pouches released in September 2016.

As of December 2014, Grizzly was cited as the flagship brand of Reynolds American with a 31.1% market share in snuff brands.

Introduced in 2024, Grizzly Nicotine Pouches are available in a variety of styles for consumers who prefer nicotine products without the tobacco leaf.

== Varieties ==
- Long Cut Natural (Also known as Grizzly 1900 Long Cut, or Grizzly Natural 1900)
- Fine Cut Natural
- Extra Long Cut Natural
- Snuff
- Snuff Pouches
- Long Cut Straight
- Straight Pouches
- Long Cut Mint
- Mint Pouches
- Fine Cut Wintergreen
- Long Cut Wintergreen
- Wintergreen Pouches
- Wide Cut Wintergreen
- Long Cut Dark Wintergreen (fire-cured tobacco)
- Dark Wintergreen Pouches
- Long Cut Dark Mint
- Long Cut Dark Straight / Select
- Snus
