= Yorklyn, Delaware =

- Unincorporated community
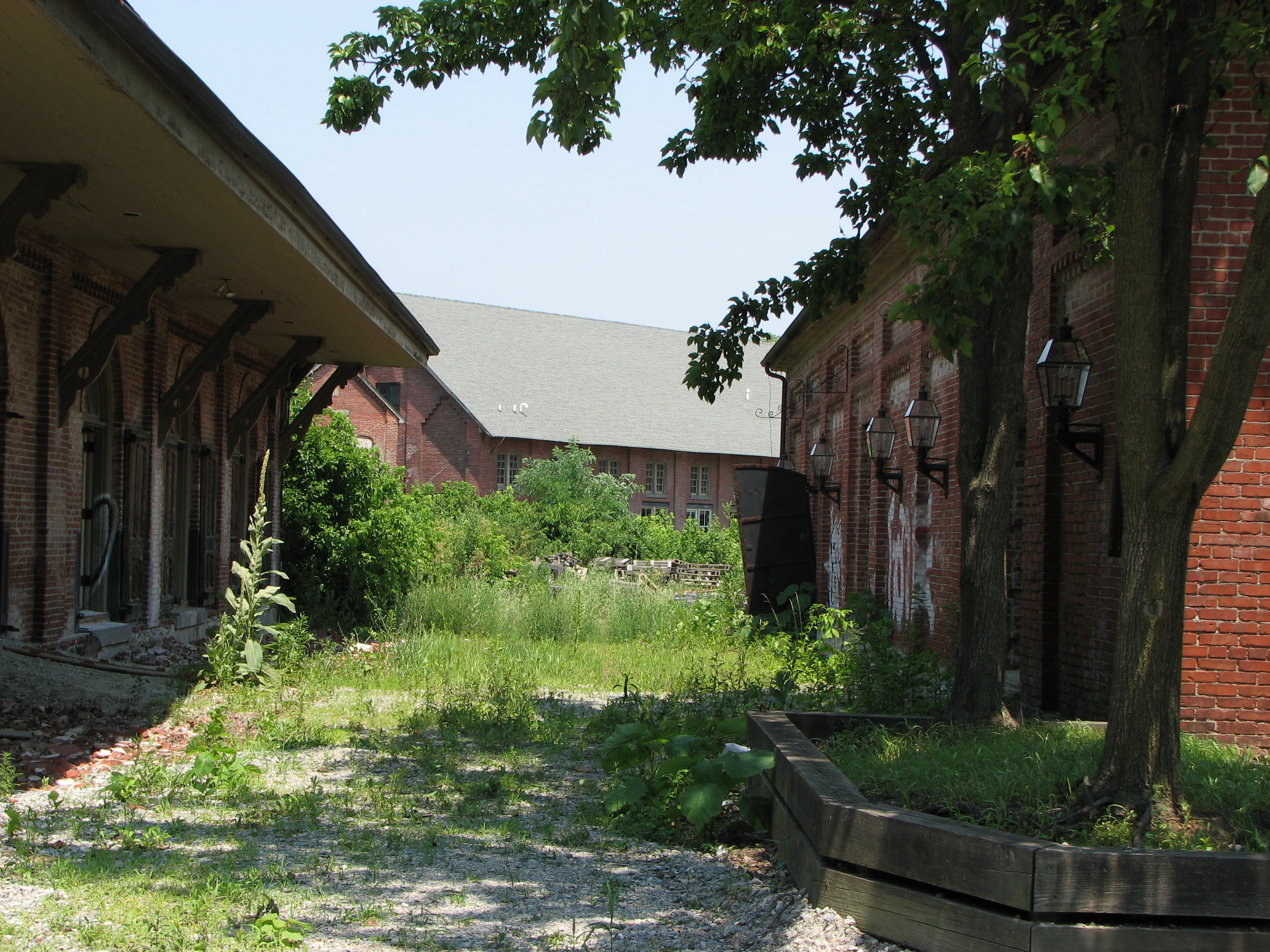
- Abandoned warehouses of the Garrett Snuff Mill in Yorklyn

- Location within the state of Delaware Yorklyn (the United States)
- Coordinates: 39°48′29″N 75°40′32″W
- Country: United States
- State: Delaware
- County: New Castle
- Elevation: 174 ft (53 m)
- Time zone: UTC-5 (Eastern (EST))
  - Summer (DST): UTC-4 (EDT)
- ZIP code: 19736
- Area code: 302
- GNIS feature ID: 216260

Yorklyn is an unincorporated community in northern New Castle County, Delaware, United States. It lies along Delaware Route 82 northwest of the city of Wilmington, the county seat of New Castle County. Its elevation is 174 feet (53 m). It has a post office with the ZIP code 19736.

Yorklyn is home to Auburn Valley State Park which includes the Friends of Auburn Heights Preserve and Marshall Steam Museum with the largest operating collection of Stanley Steamer cars in the world. Also nearby is Ashland Nature Center and the Center for the Creative Arts along with the Yorklyn Recreation Center, commonly referred to as the Yorklyn pool, which houses two pools, tennis courts, and basketball courts.

The Auburn Mills Historic District, Garrett Snuff Mills Historic District, Graves Mill Historic District, and Garrett Snuff Mill are listed on the National Register of Historic Places.

The National Vulcanized Fiber company was headquartered in Yorklyn, which made paper products for over 100 years. Since NVF's bankruptcy in 2008, the plant has been largely torn down and the land purchased by the State of Delaware for Auburn Heights Preserve, a Delaware State Park. Plans are underway to restore the original Marshall Brothers Mill into a museum and using some of the original NVF buildings for commercial and residential uses. The Delaware Division of Hazardous Waste & Substances has remediated the site, which was contaminated with zinc and other heavy metals.

A fire tore through one of the abandoned NVF buildings on the site in spring of 2021, which was compounded due to lack of access to water to put out the fire. A new fire hydrant has since been installed at the site.

The Garrett Snuff Mill complex, north of the NVF plant in Yorklyn has been partially restored. As of 2023, it is currently the site of a brewery and bike shop.
