= 1988 Holly Farms 400 =

26th race of the 1988 NASCAR Winston Cup Series

Race details
- Race 26 of 29 in the 1988 NASCAR Winston Cup Series
- The 1988 Holly Farms 400 program cover, featuring Terry Labonte.
- Date: October 16, 1988
- Official name: 39th Annual Holly Farms 400
- Location: North Wilkesboro Speedway, North Wilkesboro, North Carolina
- Course: Permanent racing facility
- Course length: 1.006 km (0.625 miles)
- Distance: 400 laps, 250 mi (402.336 km)
- Scheduled distance: 400 laps, 250 mi (402.336 km)
- Average speed: 94.192 miles per hour (151.587 km/h)
- Attendance: 35,000

Pole position
Driver	Bill Elliott	Melling Racing
- Time: 19.247

Most laps led
Driver	Ricky Rudd	King Racing
- Laps: 154

Winner
No. 27	Rusty Wallace	Blue Max Racing

Television in the United States
- Network: ESPN
- Announcers: Jerry Punch, Ned Jarrett

Radio in the United States
- Radio: Motor Racing Network

The 1988 Holly Farms 400 was the 26th stock car race of the 1988 NASCAR Winston Cup Series season and the 39th iteration of the event. Originally scheduled to be the 25th race of the season and to be held on Sunday, October 2, the race was delayed by two weeks due to rain and scheduling conflicts. The race was eventually held on Sunday, October 16, before an audience of 35,000 in North Wilkesboro, North Carolina at the North Wilkesboro Speedway, a 0.625 miles (1.006 km) oval short track. The race took the scheduled 400 laps to complete.

In a three-lap sprint to the finish, Blue Max Racing's Rusty Wallace and Hendrick Motorsports' Geoff Bodine engaged for a battle for the victory. On the final lap of the race, Bodine moved Wallace up the track in the first turn, giving Bodine the lead. However, heading into the final turns, Wallace was close enough to be able to bump Bodine back, eventually deciding to send him up the track, giving Wallace the victory. The victory was Wallace's eighth career NASCAR Winston Cup Series victory and his fourth victory of the season. To fill out the top three, Jackson Bros. Motorsports' Phil Parsons and the aforementioned Geoff Bodine finished second and third, respectively.

== Background ==
The layout of North Wilkesboro Speedway, the venue where the race was held

North Wilkesboro Speedway is a short oval racetrack located on U.S. Route 421, about five miles east of the town of North Wilkesboro, North Carolina, or 80 miles north of Charlotte. It measures 0.625 mi (1.006 km) and features a unique uphill backstretch and downhill frontstretch. It has previously held races in NASCAR's top three series, including 93 Winston Cup Series races. The track, a NASCAR original, operated from 1949, NASCAR's inception, until the track's original closure in 1996. The speedway briefly reopened in 2010 and hosted several stock car series races before closing again in the spring of 2011. It was re-opened in August 2022 for grassroots racing.

=== Entry list ===
- (R) denotes rookie driver.

#	Driver	Team	Make	Sponsor
2	Ernie Irvan (R)	U.S. Racing	Chevrolet	Kroger
3	Dale Earnhardt	Richard Childress Racing	Chevrolet	GM Goodwrench Service
4	Rick Wilson	Morgan–McClure Motorsports	Oldsmobile	Kodak
5	Geoff Bodine	Hendrick Motorsports	Chevrolet	Levi Garrett
6	Mark Martin	Roush Racing	Ford	Stroh Light
7	Alan Kulwicki	AK Racing	Ford	Zerex
8	Bobby Hillin Jr.	Stavola Brothers Racing	Buick	Miller High Life
9	Bill Elliott	Melling Racing	Ford	Coors Light
09	Doug French	Caragias Racing	Chevrolet	Caragias Racing
10	Ken Bouchard (R)	Whitcomb Racing	Ford	Whitcomb Racing
11	Terry Labonte	Junior Johnson & Associates	Chevrolet	Budweiser
12	Mike Alexander	Stavola Brothers Racing	Buick	Miller High Life
15	Brett Bodine	Bud Moore Engineering	Ford	Crisco
17	Darrell Waltrip	Hendrick Motorsports	Chevrolet	Tide
20	Alan Russell	Russell Racing	Chevrolet	Russell Racing
21	Kyle Petty	Wood Brothers Racing	Ford	Citgo
22	Rob Moroso	Moroso Racing	Oldsmobile	Prestone
24	Kevin Evans	Gray Racing	Pontiac	Gray Racing
25	Ken Schrader	Hendrick Motorsports	Chevrolet	Folgers
26	Ricky Rudd	King Racing	Buick	Quaker State
27	Rusty Wallace	Blue Max Racing	Pontiac	Kodiak
28	Davey Allison	Ranier-Lundy Racing	Ford	Havoline
29	Dale Jarrett	Cale Yarborough Motorsports	Oldsmobile	Hardee's
30	Michael Waltrip	Bahari Racing	Pontiac	Country Time
31	Lee Faulk	Bob Clark Motorsports	Oldsmobile	Slender You Figure Salons
33	Harry Gant	Mach 1 Racing	Chevrolet	Skoal Bandit
38	Mike Laws	Pro-Star Motorsports	Oldsmobile	Pro-Star Motorsports
43	Richard Petty	Petty Enterprises	Pontiac	STP
44	Sterling Marlin	Hagan Racing	Oldsmobile	Piedmont Airlines
52	Jimmy Means (Note: After Means failed to qualify for the event, he substituted in place of Benny Parsons, who decided to join the commentary crew for ESPN for the race.)	Jimmy Means Racing	Pontiac	Eureka
55	Phil Parsons	Jackson Bros. Motorsports	Oldsmobile	Crown Central Petroleum, Skoal Classic
57	Morgan Shepherd	Osterlund Racing	Buick	Heinz
67	Brad Teague	Arrington Racing	Ford	Pannill Sweatshirts
70	J. D. McDuffie	McDuffie Racing	Pontiac	Rumple Furniture
71	Dave Marcis	Marcis Auto Racing	Chevrolet	Lifebuoy
75	Neil Bonnett	RahMoc Enterprises	Pontiac	Valvoline
83	Lake Speed	Speed Racing	Oldsmobile	Wynn's, Kmart
88	Greg Sacks	Baker-Schiff Racing	Oldsmobile	Red Baron Frozen Pizza
90	Benny Parsons	Donlavey Racing	Ford	Bull's-Eye Barbecue Sauce
98	Brad Noffsinger (R)	Curb Racing	Buick	Sunoco

== Qualifying ==
Qualifying was split into two rounds. The first round was held on Friday, September 30, at 3:00 PM EST. Each driver had one lap to set a time. During the first round, the top 10 drivers in the round were guaranteed a starting spot in the race. If a driver was not able to guarantee a spot in the first round, they had the option to scrub their time from the first round and try and run a faster lap time in a second round qualifying run, held on Saturday, October 1, at 11:30 AM EST. As with the first round, each driver had one lap to set a time. For this specific race, positions 11-30 were decided on time, and depending on who needed it, a select amount of positions were given to cars who had not otherwise qualified but were high enough in owner's points; up to two were given.

Bill Elliott, driving for Melling Racing, managed to win the pole, setting a time of 19.247 and an average speed of 116.901 miles per hour (188.134 km/h) in the first round.

Eight drivers failed to qualify.

=== Full qualifying results ===
Pos.	#	Driver	Team	Make	Time	Speed
1	9	Bill Elliott	Melling Racing	Ford	19.247	116.901
2	7	Alan Kulwicki	AK Racing	Ford	19.324	116.436
3	25	Ken Schrader	Hendrick Motorsports	Chevrolet	19.332	116.387
4	26	Ricky Rudd	King Racing	Buick	19.384	116.075
5	83	Lake Speed	Speed Racing	Oldsmobile	19.395	116.009
6	6	Mark Martin	Roush Racing	Ford	19.416	115.884
7	33	Harry Gant	Mach 1 Racing	Chevrolet	19.416	115.884
8	5	Geoff Bodine	Hendrick Motorsports	Chevrolet	19.452	115.669
9	11	Terry Labonte	Junior Johnson & Associates	Chevrolet	19.478	115.515
10	55	Phil Parsons	Jackson Bros. Motorsports	Oldsmobile	19.508	115.335
Failed to lock in the first round
11	75	Neil Bonnett	RahMoc Enterprises	Pontiac	19.483	115.485
12	27	Rusty Wallace	Blue Max Racing	Pontiac	19.486	115.468
13	28	Davey Allison	Ranier-Lundy Racing	Ford	19.501	115.379
14	15	Brett Bodine	Bud Moore Engineering	Ford	19.501	115.379
15	88	Greg Sacks	Baker–Schiff Racing	Oldsmobile	19.511	115.320
16	43	Richard Petty	Petty Enterprises	Pontiac	19.513	115.308
17	2	Ernie Irvan (R)	U.S. Racing	Pontiac	19.529	115.213
18	21	Kyle Petty	Wood Brothers Racing	Ford	19.529	115.213
19	29	Dale Jarrett	Cale Yarborough Motorsports	Oldsmobile	19.545	115.119
20	44	Sterling Marlin	Hagan Racing	Oldsmobile	19.613	114.720
21	17	Darrell Waltrip	Hendrick Motorsports	Chevrolet	19.614	114.714
22	3	Dale Earnhardt	Richard Childress Racing	Chevrolet	19.614	114.714
23	12	Mike Alexander	Stavola Brothers Racing	Buick	19.638	114.574
24	10	Ken Bouchard (R)	Whitcomb Racing	Ford	19.678	114.341
25	31	Lee Faulk	Bob Clark Motorsports	Oldsmobile	19.682	114.318
26	22	Rob Moroso	Moroso Racing	Oldsmobile	19.706	114.178
27	30	Michael Waltrip	Bahari Racing	Pontiac	19.708	114.167
28	8	Bobby Hillin Jr.	Stavola Brothers Racing	Buick	19.710	114.155
29	57	Morgan Shepherd	Osterlund Racing	Buick	19.726	114.063
30	71	Dave Marcis	Marcis Auto Racing	Chevrolet	19.738	113.993
Provisionals
31	4	Rick Wilson	Morgan–McClure Motorsports	Oldsmobile	19.805	113.608
32	90	Benny Parsons	Donlavey Racing	Ford	19.781	113.746
Failed to qualify (results unknown)
33	70	J. D. McDuffie	McDuffie Racing	Pontiac	-*	-*
34	52	Jimmy Means	Jimmy Means Racing	Pontiac	-*	-*
35	98	Brad Noffsinger (R)	Curb Racing	Buick	-*	-*
36	67	Brad Teague	Arrington Racing	Ford	-*	-*
37	24	Kevin Evans	Gray Racing	Pontiac	-*	-*
38	09	Doug French	Caragias Racing	Chevrolet	-*	-*
39	20	Alan Russell	Russell Racing	Chevrolet	-*	-*
40	38	Mike Laws	Pro-Star Motorsports	Oldsmobile	-*	-*
Official first round qualifying results
Official starting lineup

== Race results ==
Fin	St	#	Driver	Team	Make	Laps	Led	Status	Pts	Winnings
1	12	27	Rusty Wallace	Blue Max Racing	Pontiac	400	30	running	180	$47,000
2	10	55	Phil Parsons	Jackson Bros. Motorsports	Oldsmobile	400	0	running	170	$22,900
3	8	5	Geoff Bodine	Hendrick Motorsports	Chevrolet	400	49	running	170	$16,750
4	9	11	Terry Labonte	Junior Johnson & Associates	Chevrolet	400	0	running	160	$12,825
5	1	9	Bill Elliott	Melling Racing	Ford	400	45	running	160	$21,625
6	22	3	Dale Earnhardt	Richard Childress Racing	Chevrolet	400	107	running	155	$15,475
7	4	26	Ricky Rudd	King Racing	Buick	400	154	running	156	$10,025
8	3	25	Ken Schrader	Hendrick Motorsports	Chevrolet	399	0	running	142	$7,030
9	23	12	Mike Alexander	Stavola Brothers Racing	Buick	399	0	running	138	$8,000
10	15	88	Greg Sacks	Baker–Schiff Racing	Oldsmobile	399	0	running	134	$9,250
11	13	28	Davey Allison	Ranier-Lundy Racing	Ford	399	0	running	130	$10,145
12	21	17	Darrell Waltrip	Hendrick Motorsports	Chevrolet	399	0	running	127	$7,595
13	28	8	Bobby Hillin Jr.	Stavola Brothers Racing	Buick	399	0	running	124	$5,020
14	20	44	Sterling Marlin	Hagan Racing	Oldsmobile	398	0	running	121	$6,765
15	5	83	Lake Speed	Speed Racing	Oldsmobile	398	0	running	118	$3,695
16	18	21	Kyle Petty	Wood Brothers Racing	Ford	398	0	running	115	$7,370
17	14	15	Brett Bodine	Bud Moore Engineering	Ford	398	0	running	112	$8,945
18	16	43	Richard Petty	Petty Enterprises	Pontiac	397	0	running	109	$4,420
19	6	6	Mark Martin	Roush Racing	Ford	397	0	running	106	$4,320
20	31	4	Rick Wilson	Morgan–McClure Motorsports	Oldsmobile	396	0	running	103	$3,270
21	30	71	Dave Marcis	Marcis Auto Racing	Chevrolet	396	0	running	100	$3,850
22	29	57	Morgan Shepherd	Osterlund Racing	Buick	396	0	running	97	$1,475
23	19	29	Dale Jarrett	Cale Yarborough Motorsports	Oldsmobile	395	0	running	94	$2,250
24	32	90	Jimmy Means	Donlavey Racing	Ford	394	0	running	91	$3,650
25	27	30	Michael Waltrip	Bahari Racing	Pontiac	392	0	running	88	$3,675
26	17	2	Ernie Irvan (R)	U.S. Racing	Pontiac	390	0	running	85	$2,750
27	24	10	Ken Bouchard (R)	Whitcomb Racing	Ford	389	0	running	82	$2,225
28	11	75	Neil Bonnett	RahMoc Enterprises	Pontiac	380	1	running	84	$7,025
29	2	7	Alan Kulwicki	AK Racing	Ford	297	14	engine	81	$2,850
30	7	33	Harry Gant	Mach 1 Racing	Chevrolet	229	0	rear seal	73	$2,775
31	26	22	Rob Moroso	Moroso Racing	Oldsmobile	142	0	ignition	70	$1,250
32	25	31	Lee Faulk	Bob Clark Motorsports	Oldsmobile	129	0	rear end	0	$1,250
Failed to qualify (results unknown)
33		70	J. D. McDuffie	McDuffie Racing	Pontiac					
34		52	Jimmy Means	Jimmy Means Racing	Pontiac					
35		98	Brad Noffsinger (R)	Curb Racing	Buick					
36		67	Brad Teague	Arrington Racing	Ford					
37		24	Kevin Evans	Gray Racing	Pontiac					
38		09	Doug French	Caragias Racing	Chevrolet					
39		20	Alan Russell	Russell Racing	Chevrolet					
40		38	Mike Laws	Pro-Star Motorsports	Oldsmobile					
Official race results

== Standings after the race ==
Drivers' Championship standings

	Pos	Driver	Points
	1	Bill Elliott	4,028
	2	Rusty Wallace	3,939 (-89)
	3	Dale Earnhardt	3,840 (-188)
	4	Terry Labonte	3,520 (–508)
	5	Ken Schrader	3,452 (–576)
1	6	Geoff Bodine	3,448 (–580)
1	7	Darrell Waltrip	3,405 (–623)
	8	Sterling Marlin	3,289 (–739)
1	9	Phil Parsons	3,230 (–798)
1	10	Davey Allison	3,204 (–824)
Official driver's standings

- Note: Only the first 10 positions are included for the driver standings.

== Notes ==
Previous race: 1988 Oakwood Homes 500	NASCAR Winston Cup Series; 1988 season	Next race: 1988 AC Delco 500
