= 1988 Delaware 500 =

23rd race of the 1988 NASCAR Winston Cup Series

Race details
- Race 23 of 29 in the 1988 NASCAR Winston Cup Series
- The 1988 Delaware 500 program cover.
- Date: September 18, 1988
- Official name: 18th Annual Delaware 500
- Location: Dover, Delaware, Dover Downs International Speedway
- Course: Permanent racing facility
- Course length: 1.6 km (1 miles)
- Distance: 500 laps, 500 mi (804.672 km)
- Scheduled distance: 500 laps, 500 mi (804.672 km)
- Average speed: 109.349 miles per hour (175.980 km/h)
- Attendance: 56,500

Pole position
Driver	Mark Martin	Roush Racing
- Time: 24.312

Most laps led
Driver	Bill Elliott	Melling Racing
- Laps: 392

Winner
No. 9	Bill Elliott	Melling Racing

Television in the United States
- Network: ESPN
- Announcers: Bob Jenkins, Benny Parsons, Gary Nelson

Radio in the United States
- Radio: Motor Racing Network

The 1988 Delaware 500 was the 23rd stock car race of the 1988 NASCAR Winston Cup Series season and the 18th iteration of the event. The race was held on Sunday, September 18, 1988, before an audience of 56,500 in Dover, Delaware at Dover Downs International Speedway, a 1-mile (1.6 km) permanent oval-shaped racetrack. The race took the scheduled 500 laps to complete. At race's end, Melling Racing's Bill Elliott managed to dominate a majority of the race, leading 392 laps to take his 29th career NASCAR Winston Cup Series victory and his sixth and final victory of the season. To fill out the top three, Richard Childress Racing's Dale Earnhardt and Blue Max Racing's Rusty Wallace would finish second and third, respectively.

== Background ==
The layout of Dover Downs International Speedway, the venue where the race was held.

Dover Downs International Speedway is an oval race track in Dover, Delaware, United States that has held at least two NASCAR races since it opened in 1969. In addition to NASCAR, the track also hosted USAC and the NTT IndyCar Series. The track features one layout, a 1-mile (1.6 km) concrete oval, with 24° banking in the turns and 9° banking on the straights. The speedway is owned and operated by Dover Motorsports.

The track, nicknamed "The Monster Mile", was built in 1969 by Melvin Joseph of Melvin L. Joseph Construction Company, Inc., with an asphalt surface, but was replaced with concrete in 1995. Six years later in 2001, the track's capacity moved to 135,000 seats, making the track have the largest capacity of sports venue in the mid-Atlantic. In 2002, the name changed to Dover International Speedway from Dover Downs International Speedway after Dover Downs Gaming and Entertainment split, making Dover Motorsports. From 2007 to 2009, the speedway worked on an improvement project called "The Monster Makeover", which expanded facilities at the track and beautified the track. After the 2014 season, the track's capacity was reduced to 95,500 seats.

=== Entry list ===
- (R) denotes rookie driver.

#	Driver	Team	Make	Sponsor
2	Ernie Irvan (R)	U.S. Racing	Chevrolet	Kroger
3	Dale Earnhardt	Richard Childress Racing	Chevrolet	GM Goodwrench Service
4	Rick Wilson	Morgan–McClure Motorsports	Oldsmobile	Kodak
5	Geoff Bodine	Hendrick Motorsports	Chevrolet	Levi Garrett
6	Mark Martin	Roush Racing	Ford	Stroh Light
7	Alan Kulwicki	AK Racing	Ford	Zerex
8	Bobby Hillin Jr.	Stavola Brothers Racing	Buick	Miller High Life
9	Bill Elliott	Melling Racing	Ford	Coors Light
10	Ken Bouchard (R)	Whitcomb Racing	Ford	Whitcomb Racing
11	Terry Labonte	Junior Johnson & Associates	Chevrolet	Budweiser
12	Mike Alexander	Stavola Brothers Racing	Buick	Miller High Life
15	Brett Bodine	Bud Moore Engineering	Ford	Crisco
17	Darrell Waltrip	Hendrick Motorsports	Chevrolet	Tide
19	Chad Little	Little Racing	Ford	Coors Extra Gold
21	Kyle Petty	Wood Brothers Racing	Ford	Citgo
23	Eddie Bierschwale	B&B Racing	Oldsmobile	Wayne Paging
25	Ken Schrader	Hendrick Motorsports	Chevrolet	Folgers
26	Ricky Rudd	King Racing	Buick	Quaker State
27	Rusty Wallace	Blue Max Racing	Pontiac	Kodiak
28	Davey Allison	Ranier-Lundy Racing	Ford	Havoline
29	Dale Jarrett	Cale Yarborough Motorsports	Oldsmobile	Hardee's
30	Michael Waltrip	Bahari Racing	Pontiac	Country Time
31	Jim Sauter	Bob Clark Motorsports	Oldsmobile	Slender You Figure Salons
33	Harry Gant	Mach 1 Racing	Chevrolet	Skoal Bandit
40	Ben Hess	Hess Racing	Oldsmobile	Hess Racing
43	Richard Petty	Petty Enterprises	Pontiac	STP
44	Sterling Marlin	Hagan Racing	Oldsmobile	Piedmont Airlines
48	James Hylton	Hylton Motorsports	Buick	Hylton Motorsports
52	Jimmy Means	Jimmy Means Racing	Pontiac	Eureka
55	Phil Parsons	Jackson Bros. Motorsports	Oldsmobile	Crown Central Petroleum, Skoal Classic
67	Brad Teague	Arrington Racing	Ford	Pannill Sweatshirts
68	Derrike Cope	Testa Racing	Ford	Purolator Filters
70	J. D. McDuffie	McDuffie Racing	Pontiac	Rumple Furniture
71	Dave Marcis	Marcis Auto Racing	Chevrolet	Lifebuoy
74	Randy LaJoie	Wawak Racing	Chevrolet	Wawak Racing
75	Neil Bonnett	RahMoc Enterprises	Pontiac	Valvoline
76	Graham Taylor	Betty Taylor Racing	Ford	Betty Taylor Racing
80	Jimmy Horton (R)	S&H Racing	Ford	S&H Racing
83	Lake Speed	Speed Racing	Oldsmobile	Wynn's, Kmart
85	Bobby Gerhart	Bobby Gerhart Racing	Chevrolet	James Chevrolet
86	Rick Jeffrey	Jeffrey Racing	Chevrolet	Slenderizers
88	Morgan Shepherd	Baker-Schiff Racing	Oldsmobile	Red Baron Frozen Pizza
90	Benny Parsons	Donlavey Racing	Ford	Bull's-Eye Barbecue Sauce
96	Dana Patten	Patten Racing	Buick	U.S. Chrome
97	Rodney Combs	Winkle Motorsports	Buick	AC Spark Plug
98	Brad Noffsinger (R)	Curb Racing	Buick	Sunoco

== Qualifying ==
Qualifying was split into two rounds. The first round was held on Friday, September 16, at 3:00 PM EST. Each driver would have one lap to set a time. During the first round, the top 20 drivers in the round would be guaranteed a starting spot in the race. If a driver was not able to guarantee a spot in the first round, they had the option to scrub their time from the first round and try and run a faster lap time in a second round qualifying run, held on Saturday, September 17, at 11:30 AM EST. As with the first round, each driver would have one lap to set a time. For this specific race, positions 21-40 would be decided on time, and depending on who needed it, a select amount of positions were given to cars who had not otherwise qualified but were high enough in owner's points; up to two provisionals were given.

Mark Martin, driving for Roush Racing, would win the pole, setting a time of 24.312 and an average speed of 148.075 miles per hour (238.304 km/h) in the first round.

Six drivers would fail to qualify.

=== Full qualifying results ===
Pos.	#	Driver	Team	Make	Time	Speed
1	6	Mark Martin	Roush Racing	Ford	24.312	148.075
2	7	Alan Kulwicki	AK Racing	Ford	24.366	147.747
3	9	Bill Elliott	Melling Racing	Ford	24.514	146.855
4	15	Brett Bodine	Bud Moore Engineering	Ford	24.551	146.634
5	27	Rusty Wallace	Blue Max Racing	Pontiac	24.567	146.538
6	5	Geoff Bodine	Hendrick Motorsports	Chevrolet	24.688	145.820
7	17	Darrell Waltrip	Hendrick Motorsports	Chevrolet	24.696	145.773
8	88	Morgan Shepherd	Baker–Schiff Racing	Oldsmobile	24.742	145.502
9	25	Ken Schrader	Hendrick Motorsports	Chevrolet	24.766	145.361
10	28	Davey Allison	Ranier-Lundy Racing	Ford	24.788	145.232
11	30	Michael Waltrip	Bahari Racing	Pontiac	24.829	144.992
12	3	Dale Earnhardt	Richard Childress Racing	Chevrolet	24.899	144.584
13	21	Kyle Petty	Wood Brothers Racing	Ford	24.917	144.480
14	83	Lake Speed	Speed Racing	Oldsmobile	24.927	144.422
15	44	Sterling Marlin	Hagan Racing	Oldsmobile	24.930	144.404
16	55	Phil Parsons	Jackson Bros. Motorsports	Oldsmobile	24.948	144.300
17	29	Dale Jarrett	Cale Yarborough Motorsports	Oldsmobile	24.969	144.179
18	8	Bobby Hillin Jr.	Stavola Brothers Racing	Buick	24.988	144.069
19	26	Ricky Rudd	King Racing	Buick	25.003	143.983
20	4	Rick Wilson	Morgan–McClure Motorsports	Oldsmobile	25.016	143.908
Failed to lock in Round 1
21	12	Mike Alexander	Stavola Brothers Racing	Buick	24.708	145.702
22	43	Richard Petty	Petty Enterprises	Pontiac	24.869	144.759
23	33	Harry Gant	Mach 1 Racing	Chevrolet	24.882	144.683
24	71	Dave Marcis	Marcis Auto Racing	Chevrolet	25.042	143.758
25	11	Terry Labonte	Junior Johnson & Associates	Chevrolet	25.055	143.684
26	23	Eddie Bierschwale	B&B Racing	Oldsmobile	25.059	143.661
27	90	Benny Parsons	Donlavey Racing	Ford	25.089	143.489
28	75	Neil Bonnett	RahMoc Enterprises	Pontiac	25.101	143.421
29	74	Randy LaJoie	Wawak Racing	Chevrolet	25.101	143.421
30	52	Jimmy Means	Jimmy Means Racing	Pontiac	25.132	143.244
31	97	Rodney Combs	Winkle Motorsports	Buick	25.139	143.204
32	68	Derrike Cope	Testa Racing	Ford	25.193	142.897
33	10	Ken Bouchard (R)	Whitcomb Racing	Ford	25.214	142.778
34	31	Jim Sauter	Bob Clark Motorsports	Oldsmobile	25.220	142.744
35	2	Ernie Irvan (R)	U.S. Racing	Chevrolet	25.234	142.665
36	67	Brad Teague	Arrington Racing	Ford	25.271	142.456
37	98	Brad Noffsinger (R)	Curb Racing	Buick	25.279	142.411
38	96	Dana Patten	Patten Racing	Buick	25.283	142.388
39	19	Chad Little	Little Racing	Ford	25.919	138.894
40	80	Jimmy Horton (R)	S&H Racing	Ford	26.170	137.562
Failed to qualify
41	40	Ben Hess	Hess Racing	Oldsmobile	-*	-*
42	86	Rick Jeffrey	Jeffrey Racing	Chevrolet	-*	-*
43	85	Bobby Gerhart	Bobby Gerhart Racing	Chevrolet	-*	-*
44	76	Graham Taylor	Betty Taylor Racing	Ford	-*	-*
45	70	J. D. McDuffie	McDuffie Racing	Pontiac	-	-
46	48	James Hylton	Hylton Motorsports	Buick	-	-
Official first round qualifying results
Official starting lineup

== Race results ==
Fin	St	#	Driver	Team	Make	Laps	Led	Status	Pts	Winnings
1	3	9	Bill Elliott	Melling Racing	Ford	500	392	running	185	$56,400
2	12	3	Dale Earnhardt	Richard Childress Racing	Chevrolet	500	50	running	175	$37,450
3	5	27	Rusty Wallace	Blue Max Racing	Pontiac	500	0	running	165	$26,200
4	10	28	Davey Allison	Ranier-Lundy Racing	Ford	500	0	running	160	$21,600
5	6	5	Geoff Bodine	Hendrick Motorsports	Chevrolet	500	4	running	160	$16,250
6	13	21	Kyle Petty	Wood Brothers Racing	Ford	499	0	running	150	$14,700
7	21	12	Mike Alexander	Stavola Brothers Racing	Buick	499	0	running	146	$13,375
8	28	75	Neil Bonnett	RahMoc Enterprises	Pontiac	499	0	running	142	$12,325
9	14	83	Lake Speed	Speed Racing	Oldsmobile	498	0	running	138	$7,375
10	19	26	Ricky Rudd	King Racing	Buick	497	0	running	134	$10,650
11	23	33	Harry Gant	Mach 1 Racing	Chevrolet	497	0	running	130	$7,825
12	11	30	Michael Waltrip	Bahari Racing	Pontiac	497	0	running	127	$9,225
13	35	2	Ernie Irvan (R)	U.S. Racing	Chevrolet	496	0	running	124	$5,625
14	16	55	Phil Parsons	Jackson Bros. Motorsports	Oldsmobile	494	1	running	126	$6,525
15	39	19	Chad Little	Little Racing	Ford	494	0	running	118	$3,175
16	24	71	Dave Marcis	Marcis Auto Racing	Chevrolet	493	7	running	120	$6,100
17	7	17	Darrell Waltrip	Hendrick Motorsports	Chevrolet	492	0	running	112	$9,450
18	25	11	Terry Labonte	Junior Johnson & Associates	Chevrolet	491	0	running	109	$9,400
19	30	52	Jimmy Means	Jimmy Means Racing	Pontiac	481	0	running	106	$4,350
20	40	80	Jimmy Horton (R)	S&H Racing	Ford	478	0	running	103	$2,950
21	18	8	Bobby Hillin Jr.	Stavola Brothers Racing	Buick	477	0	running	100	$5,550
22	4	15	Brett Bodine	Bud Moore Engineering	Ford	465	37	running	102	$10,800
23	15	44	Sterling Marlin	Hagan Racing	Oldsmobile	458	5	engine	99	$5,750
24	20	4	Rick Wilson	Morgan–McClure Motorsports	Oldsmobile	421	0	engine	91	$3,100
25	33	10	Ken Bouchard (R)	Whitcomb Racing	Ford	409	4	crash	93	$3,350
26	26	23	Eddie Bierschwale	B&B Racing	Oldsmobile	391	0	crash	85	$2,000
27	27	90	Benny Parsons	Donlavey Racing	Ford	383	0	clutch	82	$4,800
28	17	29	Dale Jarrett	Cale Yarborough Motorsports	Oldsmobile	377	0	crash	79	$3,400
29	8	88	Morgan Shepherd	Baker–Schiff Racing	Oldsmobile	371	0	engine	76	$4,550
30	36	67	Brad Teague	Arrington Racing	Ford	340	0	engine	0	$3,800
31	2	7	Alan Kulwicki	AK Racing	Ford	326	0	crash	70	$4,825
32	34	31	Jim Sauter	Bob Clark Motorsports	Oldsmobile	281	0	engine	67	$2,350
33	38	96	Dana Patten	Patten Racing	Buick	259	0	crash	64	$1,650
34	37	98	Brad Noffsinger (R)	Curb Racing	Buick	182	0	engine	61	$1,600
35	9	25	Ken Schrader	Hendrick Motorsports	Chevrolet	180	0	crash	58	$7,700
36	32	68	Derrike Cope	Testa Racing	Ford	111	0	crash	55	$1,475
37	29	74	Randy LaJoie	Wawak Racing	Chevrolet	89	0	engine	0	$1,460
38	22	43	Richard Petty	Petty Enterprises	Pontiac	72	0	engine	49	$4,070
39	1	6	Mark Martin	Roush Racing	Ford	35	0	crash	46	$7,520
40	31	97	Rodney Combs	Winkle Motorsports	Buick	16	0	piston	43	$1,400
Failed to qualify
41		40	Ben Hess	Hess Racing	Oldsmobile					
42		86	Rick Jeffrey	Jeffrey Racing	Chevrolet					
43		85	Bobby Gerhart	Bobby Gerhart Racing	Chevrolet					
44		76	Graham Taylor	Betty Taylor Racing	Ford					
45		70	J. D. McDuffie	McDuffie Racing	Pontiac					
46		48	James Hylton	Hylton Motorsports	Buick					
Official race results

== Standings after the race ==
Drivers' Championship standings

	Pos	Driver	Points
	1	Bill Elliott	3,548
	2	Dale Earnhardt	3,421 (-127)
	3	Rusty Wallace	3,409 (-139)
	4	Terry Labonte	3,075 (–473)
1	5	Geoff Bodine	3,048 (–500)
1	6	Ken Schrader	2,999 (–549)
1	7	Darrell Waltrip	2,923 (–625)
1	8	Sterling Marlin	2,918 (–630)
	9	Phil Parsons	2,878 (–670)
	10	Davey Allison	2,854 (–694)
Official driver's standings

- Note: Only the first 10 positions are included for the driver standings.

Previous race: 1988 Miller High Life 400 (Richmond)	NASCAR Winston Cup Series; 1988 season	Next race: 1988 Goody's 500
