= 1988 AC Delco 500 =

27th race of the 1988 NASCAR Winston Cup Series

Race details
- Race 27 of 29 in the 1988 NASCAR Winston Cup Series
- The 1988 AC Delco 500 program cover.
- Date: October 23, 1988
- Official name: 24th Annual AC Delco 500
- Location: Rockingham, North Carolina, North Carolina Motor Speedway
- Course: Permanent racing facility
- Course length: 1.636 km (1.017 miles)
- Distance: 492 laps, 500.364 mi (805.257 km)
- Scheduled distance: 492 laps, 500.364 mi (805.257 km)
- Average speed: 111.557 miles per hour (179.534 km/h)
- Attendance: 52,400

Pole position
Driver	Bill Elliott	Melling Racing
- Time: 24.678

Most laps led
Driver	Bill Elliott	Melling Racing
- Laps: 217

Winner
No. 27	Rusty Wallace	Blue Max Racing

Television in the United States
- Network: ESPN
- Announcers: Bob Jenkins, Ned Jarrett, Gary Nelson

Radio in the United States
- Radio: Motor Racing Network

The 1988 AC Delco 500 was the 27th stock car race of the 1988 NASCAR Winston Cup Series season and the 24th iteration of the event. The race was held on Sunday, October 23, 1988, before an audience of 52,400 in Rockingham, North Carolina, at North Carolina Speedway, a 1.017 miles (1.637 km) permanent high-banked racetrack.

Coming back from a two-lap deficit, Blue Max Racing's Rusty Wallace managed to gain the laps back late in the first half of the race. Afterwards, he proceeded to dominate most of the second half of the race, leading 182 of the last 189 laps to take his ninth career NASCAR Winston Cup Series victory, his fifth victory of the season, and his third consecutive victory. To fill out the top three, King Racing's Ricky Rudd and Junior Johnson & Associates' Terry Labonte finished second and third, respectively.

In the driver's championship for the NASCAR Winston Cup Series, Wallace was able to gain 10 points on championship leader Bill Elliott, dropping Wallace's deficit down to 79 points.

== Background ==
The layout of North Carolina Motor Speedway, the venue where the race was held.

North Carolina Motor Speedway was opened as a flat, one-mile oval on October 31, 1965. In 1969, the track was extensively reconfigured to a high-banked, D-shaped oval just over one mile in length. In 1997, North Carolina Motor Speedway merged with Penske Motorsports, and was renamed North Carolina Speedway. Shortly thereafter, the infield was reconfigured, and competition on the infield road course, mostly by the SCCA, was discontinued. Currently, the track is home to the Fast Track High Performance Driving School.

=== Entry list ===
- (R) denotes rookie driver.

#	Driver	Team	Make	Sponsor
2	Ernie Irvan (R)	U.S. Racing	Chevrolet	Kroger
3	Dale Earnhardt	Richard Childress Racing	Chevrolet	GM Goodwrench Service
4	Rick Wilson	Morgan–McClure Motorsports	Oldsmobile	Kodak
5	Geoff Bodine	Hendrick Motorsports	Chevrolet	Levi Garrett
6	Mark Martin	Roush Racing	Ford	Stroh Light
06	Lee Raymond	Coyle Racing	Chevrolet	Riverside Auto Parts
7	Alan Kulwicki	AK Racing	Ford	Zerex
8	Bobby Hillin Jr.	Stavola Brothers Racing	Buick	Miller High Life
9	Bill Elliott	Melling Racing	Ford	Coors Light
10	Ken Bouchard (R)	Whitcomb Racing	Ford	Whitcomb Racing
11	Terry Labonte	Junior Johnson & Associates	Chevrolet	Budweiser
12	Mike Alexander	Stavola Brothers Racing	Buick	Miller High Life
13	D. Wayne Strout	Strout Racing	Oldsmobile	Greyhound Package Experience
15	Brett Bodine	Bud Moore Engineering	Ford	Crisco
17	Darrell Waltrip	Hendrick Motorsports	Chevrolet	Tide
21	Kyle Petty	Wood Brothers Racing	Ford	Citgo
22	Rodney Combs	Richard Childress Racing	Chevrolet	Richard Childress Racing
23	Eddie Bierschwale	B&B Racing	Oldsmobile	Wayne Paging
25	Ken Schrader	Hendrick Motorsports	Chevrolet	Folgers
26	Ricky Rudd	King Racing	Buick	Quaker State
27	Rusty Wallace	Blue Max Racing	Pontiac	Kodiak
28	Davey Allison	Ranier-Lundy Racing	Ford	Texaco, Havoline
29	Dale Jarrett	Cale Yarborough Motorsports	Oldsmobile	Hardee's
30	Michael Waltrip	Bahari Racing	Pontiac	Country Time
31	Jim Sauter	Bob Clark Motorsports	Oldsmobile	Slender You Figure Salons
32	Philip Duffie	Duffie Racing	Buick	Bob Beard Buick
33	Harry Gant	Mach 1 Racing	Chevrolet	Skoal Bandit
34	Connie Saylor	AAG Racing	Buick	Allen's Associated Glass
40	Ben Hess	Hess Racing	Oldsmobile	Hess Racing
43	Richard Petty	Petty Enterprises	Pontiac	STP
44	Sterling Marlin	Hagan Racing	Oldsmobile	Piedmont Airlines
52	Jimmy Means	Jimmy Means Racing	Pontiac	Eureka
55	Phil Parsons	Jackson Bros. Motorsports	Oldsmobile	Skoal, Crown Central Petroleum
57	Morgan Shepherd	Osterlund Racing	Buick	Winner's Circle Auto Parts
63	Jocko Maggiacomo	Linro Motorsports	Chevrolet	Linro Motorsports
67	Brad Teague	Arrington Racing	Ford	Pannill Sweatshirts
68	Derrike Cope	Testa Racing	Ford	Purolator
70	J. D. McDuffie	McDuffie Racing	Pontiac	Rumple Furniture
71	Dave Marcis	Marcis Auto Racing	Chevrolet	Lifebuoy
75	Neil Bonnett	RahMoc Enterprises	Pontiac	Valvoline
80	Jimmy Horton (R)	S&H Racing	Ford	S&H Racing
83	Lake Speed	Speed Racing	Oldsmobile	Wynn's, Kmart
88	Greg Sacks	Baker-Schiff Racing	Oldsmobile	Red Baron Frozen Pizza
90	Benny Parsons	Donlavey Racing	Ford	Bull's-Eye Barbecue Sauce
93	Charlie Baker	Salmon Racing	Chevrolet	Salmon Racing
97	Joe Ruttman	Winkle Motorsports	Buick	AC Spark Plug
98	Brad Noffsinger (R)	Curb Racing	Buick	Sunoco

== Qualifying ==
Qualifying was originally scheduled to be split into two rounds. The first round was held on Thursday, October 20, at 2:30 pm EST. Originally, the first 20 positions were going to be determined by first round qualifying, with positions 21-40 meant to be determined the following day on Friday, October 21. However, due to rain, the second round was cancelled. As a result, the rest of the starting lineup was set using the results from the first round. Depending on who needed it, a select amount of positions were given to cars who had not otherwise qualified but were high enough in owner's points; up to two were given.

Bill Elliott, driving for Melling Racing, managed to win the pole, setting a time of 24.678 and an average speed of 148.359 miles per hour (238.761 km/h) in the first round.

Seven drivers failed to qualify.

=== Full qualifying results ===
Pos.	#	Driver	Team	Make	Time	Speed
1	9	Bill Elliott	Melling Racing	Ford	24.678	148.359
2	7	Alan Kulwicki	AK Racing	Ford	24.706	148.191
3	27	Rusty Wallace	Blue Max Racing	Pontiac	24.790	147.689
4	6	Mark Martin	Roush Racing	Ford	24.866	147.237
5	17	Darrell Waltrip	Hendrick Motorsports	Chevrolet	24.885	147.125
6	28	Davey Allison	Ranier-Lundy Racing	Ford	24.899	147.042
7	11	Terry Labonte	Junior Johnson & Associates	Chevrolet	24.905	147.007
8	15	Brett Bodine	Bud Moore Engineering	Ford	24.919	146.924
9	26	Ricky Rudd	King Racing	Buick	24.946	146.765
10	88	Greg Sacks	Baker–Schiff Racing	Oldsmobile	25.018	146.343
11	23	Eddie Bierschwale	B&B Racing	Oldsmobile	25.054	146.132
12	33	Harry Gant	Mach 1 Racing	Chevrolet	25.085	145.952
13	3	Dale Earnhardt	Richard Childress Racing	Chevrolet	25.092	145.911
14	21	Kyle Petty	Wood Brothers Racing	Ford	25.098	145.876
15	30	Michael Waltrip	Bahari Racing	Pontiac	25.159	145.522
16	12	Mike Alexander	Stavola Brothers Racing	Buick	25.161	145.511
17	57	Morgan Shepherd	Osterlund Racing	Buick	25.171	145.453
18	44	Sterling Marlin	Hagan Racing	Oldsmobile	25.173	145.443
19	68	Derrike Cope	Testa Racing	Ford	25.221	145.165
20	5	Geoff Bodine	Hendrick Motorsports	Chevrolet	25.228	145.124
21	25	Ken Schrader	Hendrick Motorsports	Chevrolet	25.261	144.935
22	29	Dale Jarrett	Cale Yarborough Motorsports	Oldsmobile	25.268	144.895
23	55	Phil Parsons	Jackson Bros. Motorsports	Oldsmobile	25.276	144.849
24	4	Rick Wilson	Morgan–McClure Motorsports	Oldsmobile	25.294	144.746
25	75	Neil Bonnett	RahMoc Enterprises	Pontiac	25.297	144.729
26	97	Joe Ruttman	Winkle Motorsports	Buick	25.387	144.216
27	67	Brad Teague	Arrington Racing	Ford	25.402	144.130
28	22	Rodney Combs	Richard Childress Racing	Chevrolet	25.432	143.960
29	90	Benny Parsons	Donlavey Racing	Ford	25.445	143.887
30	83	Lake Speed	Speed Racing	Oldsmobile	25.445	143.887
31	98	Brad Noffsinger (R)	Curb Racing	Buick	25.472	143.734
32	2	Ernie Irvan (R)	U.S. Racing	Pontiac	25.479	143.695
33	31	Jim Sauter	Bob Clark Motorsports	Oldsmobile	25.482	143.678
34	71	Dave Marcis	Marcis Auto Racing	Chevrolet	25.509	143.526
35	43	Richard Petty	Petty Enterprises	Pontiac	25.555	143.267
36	40	Ben Hess	Hess Racing	Oldsmobile	25.582	143.116
37	52	Jimmy Means	Jimmy Means Racing	Pontiac	25.615	142.932
38	8	Bobby Hillin Jr.	Stavola Brothers Racing	Buick	25.692	142.504
39	34	Connie Saylor	AAG Racing	Buick	25.745	142.210
40	10	Ken Bouchard (R)	Whitcomb Racing	Pontiac	25.746	142.205
Failed to qualify
41	32	Philip Duffie	Duffie Racing	Buick	-*	-*
42	63	Jocko Maggiacomo	Linro Motorsports	Chevrolet	-*	-*
43	13	D. Wayne Strout	Strout Racing	Oldsmobile	-*	-*
44	80	Jimmy Horton (R)	S&H Racing	Ford	-*	-*
45	93	Charlie Baker	Salmon Racing	Chevrolet	-*	-*
46	06	Lee Raymond	Coyle Racing	Chevrolet	-*	-*
47	70	J. D. McDuffie	McDuffie Racing	Pontiac	-*	-*
Official starting lineup

== Race results ==
Fin	St	#	Driver	Team	Make	Laps	Led	Status	Pts	Winnings
1	3	27	Rusty Wallace	Blue Max Racing	Pontiac	492	200	running	180	$52,150
2	9	26	Ricky Rudd	King Racing	Buick	492	8	running	175	$26,985
3	7	11	Terry Labonte	Junior Johnson & Associates	Chevrolet	492	1	running	170	$25,095
4	1	9	Bill Elliott	Melling Racing	Ford	491	217	running	170	$23,480
5	13	3	Dale Earnhardt	Richard Childress Racing	Chevrolet	491	1	running	160	$27,965
6	16	12	Mike Alexander	Stavola Brothers Racing	Buick	489	0	running	150	$12,910
7	12	33	Harry Gant	Mach 1 Racing	Chevrolet	489	0	running	146	$10,110
8	23	55	Phil Parsons	Jackson Bros. Motorsports	Oldsmobile	489	2	running	147	$9,210
9	14	21	Kyle Petty	Wood Brothers Racing	Ford	489	0	running	138	$14,410
10	25	75	Neil Bonnett	RahMoc Enterprises	Pontiac	489	0	running	134	$13,810
11	21	25	Ken Schrader	Hendrick Motorsports	Chevrolet	488	0	running	130	$11,020
12	10	88	Greg Sacks	Baker–Schiff Racing	Oldsmobile	488	0	running	127	$8,220
13	29	90	Benny Parsons	Donlavey Racing	Ford	488	0	running	124	$11,520
14	17	57	Morgan Shepherd	Osterlund Racing	Buick	487	0	running	121	$3,720
15	32	2	Ernie Irvan (R)	U.S. Racing	Pontiac	484	0	running	118	$6,470
16	34	71	Dave Marcis	Marcis Auto Racing	Chevrolet	481	1	running	120	$7,170
17	33	31	Jim Sauter	Bob Clark Motorsports	Oldsmobile	479	0	running	0	$4,820
18	40	10	Ken Bouchard (R)	Whitcomb Racing	Pontiac	477	0	running	109	$5,620
19	15	30	Michael Waltrip	Bahari Racing	Pontiac	475	0	running	106	$5,970
20	36	40	Ben Hess	Hess Racing	Oldsmobile	472	0	running	103	$3,370
21	39	34	Connie Saylor	AAG Racing	Buick	464	0	running	100	$2,565
22	24	4	Rick Wilson	Morgan–McClure Motorsports	Oldsmobile	458	0	running	97	$3,490
23	38	8	Bobby Hillin Jr.	Stavola Brothers Racing	Buick	444	11	running	99	$5,340
24	30	83	Lake Speed	Speed Racing	Oldsmobile	433	0	running	91	$3,165
25	35	43	Richard Petty	Petty Enterprises	Pontiac	425	0	engine	88	$5,090
26	2	7	Alan Kulwicki	AK Racing	Ford	379	0	handling	85	$5,140
27	6	28	Davey Allison	Ranier-Lundy Racing	Ford	374	50	crash	87	$12,290
28	4	6	Mark Martin	Roush Racing	Ford	374	0	crash	79	$4,765
29	8	15	Brett Bodine	Bud Moore Engineering	Ford	373	0	crash	76	$10,615
30	20	5	Geoff Bodine	Hendrick Motorsports	Chevrolet	355	0	crash	73	$6,715
31	5	17	Darrell Waltrip	Hendrick Motorsports	Chevrolet	276	1	engine	75	$9,625
32	22	29	Dale Jarrett	Cale Yarborough Motorsports	Oldsmobile	255	0	engine	67	$2,450
33	11	23	Eddie Bierschwale	B&B Racing	Oldsmobile	241	0	engine	64	$1,755
34	18	44	Sterling Marlin	Hagan Racing	Oldsmobile	236	0	engine	61	$4,305
35	27	67	Brad Teague	Arrington Racing	Ford	231	0	engine	58	$3,655
36	19	68	Derrike Cope	Testa Racing	Ford	231	0	crash	55	$1,600
37	31	98	Brad Noffsinger (R)	Curb Racing	Buick	173	0	crank	52	$1,575
38	26	97	Joe Ruttman	Winkle Motorsports	Buick	71	0	handling	0	$1,550
39	37	52	Jimmy Means	Jimmy Means Racing	Pontiac	29	0	engine	46	$3,525
40	28	22	Rodney Combs	Richard Childress Racing	Chevrolet	4	0	quit	43	$1,500
Failed to qualify
41		32	Philip Duffie	Duffie Racing	Buick					
42		63	Jocko Maggiacomo	Linro Motorsports	Chevrolet					
43		13	D. Wayne Strout	Strout Racing	Oldsmobile					
44		80	Jimmy Horton (R)	S&H Racing	Ford					
45		93	Charlie Baker	Salmon Racing	Chevrolet					
46		06	Lee Raymond	Coyle Racing	Chevrolet					
47		70	J. D. McDuffie	McDuffie Racing	Pontiac					
Official race results

== Standings after the race ==
Drivers' Championship standings

	Pos	Driver	Points
	1	Bill Elliott	4,198
	2	Rusty Wallace	4,119 (-79)
	3	Dale Earnhardt	4,000 (-198)
	4	Terry Labonte	3,690 (–508)
	5	Ken Schrader	3,582 (–616)
	6	Geoff Bodine	3,521 (–677)
	7	Darrell Waltrip	3,480 (–718)
1	8	Phil Parsons	3,377 (–821)
1	9	Sterling Marlin	3,350 (–848)
	10	Davey Allison	3,291 (–907)
Official driver's standings

- Note: Only the first 10 positions are included for the driver standings.

Previous race: 1988 Holly Farms 400	NASCAR Winston Cup Series; 1988 season	Next race: 1988 Checker 500
