= 1988 Goody's 500 =

24th race of the 1988 NASCAR Winston Cup Series

Race details
- Race 24 of 29 in the 1988 NASCAR Winston Cup Series
- The 1988 Goody's 500 program cover, featuring Richard Petty's wrecked car from the 1988 Daytona 500.
- Date: September 25, 1988
- Official name: 40th Annual Goody's 500
- Location: Ridgeway, Virginia, Martinsville Speedway
- Course: Permanent racing facility
- Course length: 0.847 km (0.526 miles)
- Distance: 500 laps, 263 mi (423.257 km)
- Scheduled distance: 500 laps, 263 mi (423.257 km)
- Average speed: 74.988 miles per hour (120.681 km/h)
- Attendance: 35,000

Pole position
| Driver | Rusty Wallace | Blue Max Racing |
- Time: 20.724

Most laps led
| Driver | Ricky Rudd | King Racing |
- Laps: 237

Winner
| No. 17 | Darrell Waltrip | Hendrick Motorsports |

Television in the United States
- Network: ESPN
- Announcers: Bob Jenkins, Ned Jarrett, Gary Nelson

Radio in the United States
- Radio: Motor Racing Network

The 1988 Goody's 500 was the 24th stock car race of the 1988 NASCAR Winston Cup Series season and the 40th iteration of the event. The race was held on Sunday, September 25, 1988, before an audience of 35,000 in Martinsville, Virginia at Martinsville Speedway, a 0.526 miles (0.847 km) permanent oval-shaped short track. The race took the scheduled 500 laps to complete. Taking advantage of a misfortunate Ricky Rudd, Hendrick Motorsports' Darrell Waltrip dominated the late stages of the race, leading the final 80 laps of the race to take his 73rd career NASCAR Winston Cup Series victory and his second and final victory of the season. To fill out the top three, owner-driver Alan Kulwicki and Blue Max Racing's Rusty Wallace would finish second and third, respectively.

== Background ==
The layout of Martinsville Speedway, the venue where the race was held.

Martinsville Speedway is a NASCAR-owned stock car racing track located in Henry County, in Ridgeway, Virginia, just to the south of Martinsville. At 0.526 miles (0.847 km) in length, it is the shortest track in the NASCAR Cup Series. The track was also one of the first paved oval tracks in NASCAR, being built in 1947 by H. Clay Earles. It is also the only remaining race track that has been on the NASCAR circuit from its beginning in 1948.

=== Entry list ===
- (R) denotes rookie driver.

| # | Driver | Team | Make | Sponsor |
|---|---|---|---|---|
| 2 | Ernie Irvan (R) | U.S. Racing | Chevrolet | Kroger |
| 3 | Dale Earnhardt | Richard Childress Racing | Chevrolet | GM Goodwrench Service |
| 4 | Rick Wilson | Morgan–McClure Motorsports | Oldsmobile | Kodak |
| 5 | Geoff Bodine | Hendrick Motorsports | Chevrolet | Levi Garrett |
| 6 | Mark Martin | Roush Racing | Ford | Stroh Light |
| 7 | Alan Kulwicki | AK Racing | Ford | Zerex |
| 8 | Bobby Hillin Jr. | Stavola Brothers Racing | Buick | Miller High Life |
| 9 | Bill Elliott | Melling Racing | Ford | Coors Light |
| 10 | Ken Bouchard (R) | Whitcomb Racing | Ford | Whitcomb Racing |
| 11 | Terry Labonte | Junior Johnson & Associates | Chevrolet | Budweiser |
| 12 | Mike Alexander | Stavola Brothers Racing | Buick | Miller High Life |
| 15 | Brett Bodine | Bud Moore Engineering | Ford | Crisco |
| 17 | Darrell Waltrip | Hendrick Motorsports | Chevrolet | Tide |
| 20 | Dave Mader III | Bahre Racing | Pontiac | Bahre Racing |
| 21 | Kyle Petty | Wood Brothers Racing | Ford | Citgo |
| 25 | Ken Schrader | Hendrick Motorsports | Chevrolet | Folgers |
| 26 | Ricky Rudd | King Racing | Buick | Quaker State |
| 27 | Rusty Wallace | Blue Max Racing | Pontiac | Kodiak |
| 28 | Davey Allison | Ranier-Lundy Racing | Ford | Havoline |
| 29 | Dale Jarrett | Cale Yarborough Motorsports | Oldsmobile | Hardee's |
| 30 | Michael Waltrip | Bahari Racing | Pontiac | Country Time |
| 31 | Lee Faulk | Bob Clark Motorsports | Oldsmobile | Slender You Figure Salons |
| 33 | Harry Gant | Mach 1 Racing | Chevrolet | Skoal Bandit |
| 43 | Richard Petty | Petty Enterprises | Pontiac | STP |
| 44 | Sterling Marlin | Hagan Racing | Oldsmobile | Piedmont Airlines |
| 52 | Jimmy Means | Jimmy Means Racing | Pontiac | Eureka |
| 55 | Phil Parsons | Jackson Bros. Motorsports | Oldsmobile | Crown Central Petroleum, Skoal Classic |
| 67 | Brad Teague | Arrington Racing | Ford | Pannill Sweatshirts |
| 68 | Derrike Cope | Testa Racing | Ford | Purolator Filters |
| 70 | J. D. McDuffie | McDuffie Racing | Pontiac | Rumple Furniture |
| 71 | Dave Marcis | Marcis Auto Racing | Chevrolet | Lifebuoy |
| 75 | Neil Bonnett | RahMoc Enterprises | Pontiac | Valvoline |
| 83 | Lake Speed | Speed Racing | Oldsmobile | Wynn's, Kmart |
| 88 | Greg Sacks | Baker-Schiff Racing | Oldsmobile | Red Baron Frozen Pizza |
| 90 | Benny Parsons | Donlavey Racing | Ford | Bull's-Eye Barbecue Sauce |
| 97 | Rodney Combs | Winkle Motorsports | Buick | AC Spark Plug |
| 98 | Brad Noffsinger (R) | Curb Racing | Buick | Sunoco |

== Qualifying ==
Qualifying was split into two rounds. The first round was held on Thursday, September 22, at 2:00 PM EST. Each driver would have one lap to set a time. During the first round, the top 20 drivers in the round would be guaranteed a starting spot in the race. If a driver was not able to guarantee a spot in the first round, they had the option to scrub their time from the first round and try and run a faster lap time in a second round qualifying run, held on Friday, September 23, at 1:30 PM EST. As with the first round, each driver would have one lap to set a time. For this specific race, positions 21-30 would be decided on time, and depending on who needed it, a select amount of positions were given to cars who had not otherwise qualified but were high enough in owner's points; up to two were given.

Rusty Wallace, driving for Blue Max Racing, would win the pole, setting a time of 20.724 and an average speed of 91.372 miles per hour (147.049 km/h) in the first round.

Five drivers would fail to qualify.

=== Full qualifying results ===
| Pos. | # | Driver | Team | Make | Time | Speed |
|---|---|---|---|---|---|---|
| 1 | 27 | Rusty Wallace | Blue Max Racing | Pontiac | 20.724 | 91.372 |
| 2 | 9 | Bill Elliott | Melling Racing | Ford | 20.765 | 91.192 |
| 3 | 5 | Geoff Bodine | Hendrick Motorsports | Chevrolet | 20.785 | 91.104 |
| 4 | 75 | Neil Bonnett | RahMoc Enterprises | Pontiac | 20.793 | 91.069 |
| 5 | 11 | Terry Labonte | Junior Johnson & Associates | Chevrolet | 20.802 | 91.030 |
| 6 | 7 | Alan Kulwicki | AK Racing | Ford | 20.814 | 90.977 |
| 7 | 30 | Michael Waltrip | Bahari Racing | Pontiac | 20.817 | 90.964 |
| 8 | 67 | Brad Teague | Arrington Racing | Ford | 20.828 | 90.916 |
| 9 | 88 | Greg Sacks | Baker–Schiff Racing | Oldsmobile | 20.840 | 90.864 |
| 10 | 3 | Dale Earnhardt | Richard Childress Racing | Chevrolet | 20.886 | 90.664 |
| 11 | 83 | Lake Speed | Speed Racing | Oldsmobile | 20.910 | 90.560 |
| 12 | 6 | Mark Martin | Roush Racing | Ford | 20.912 | 90.551 |
| 13 | 15 | Brett Bodine | Bud Moore Engineering | Ford | 20.924 | 90.499 |
| 14 | 26 | Ricky Rudd | King Racing | Buick | 20.925 | 90.495 |
| 15 | 4 | Rick Wilson | Morgan–McClure Motorsports | Oldsmobile | 20.991 | 90.210 |
| 16 | 33 | Harry Gant | Mach 1 Racing | Chevrolet | 20.993 | 90.201 |
| 17 | 90 | Benny Parsons | Donlavey Racing | Ford | 20.994 | 90.197 |
| 18 | 44 | Sterling Marlin | Hagan Racing | Oldsmobile | 20.996 | 90.189 |
| 19 | 25 | Ken Schrader | Hendrick Motorsports | Chevrolet | 21.013 | 90.116 |
| 20 | 17 | Darrell Waltrip | Hendrick Motorsports | Chevrolet | 21.024 | 90.068 |
Failed to lock in Round 1
| 21 | 12 | Mike Alexander | Stavola Brothers Racing | Buick | 21.040 | 90.000 |
| 22 | 28 | Davey Allison | Ranier-Lundy Racing | Ford | 21.056 | 89.932 |
| 23 | 55 | Phil Parsons | Jackson Bros. Motorsports | Oldsmobile | 21.064 | 89.897 |
| 24 | 21 | Kyle Petty | Wood Brothers Racing | Ford | 21.069 | 89.876 |
| 25 | 29 | Dale Jarrett | Cale Yarborough Motorsports | Oldsmobile | 21.070 | 89.872 |
| 26 | 57 | Morgan Shepherd | Osterlund Racing | Buick | 21.077 | 89.842 |
| 27 | 43 | Richard Petty | Petty Enterprises | Pontiac | 21.080 | 89.829 |
| 28 | 52 | Jimmy Means | Jimmy Means Racing | Pontiac | 89.799 | 89.799 |
| 29 | 2 | Ernie Irvan (R) | U.S. Racing | Pontiac | 21.120 | 89.659 |
| 30 | 10 | Ken Bouchard (R) | Whitcomb Racing | Ford | 21.149 | 89.536 |
Provisionals
| 31 | 8 | Bobby Hillin Jr. | Stavola Brothers Racing | Buick | -* | -* |
| 32 | 71 | Dave Marcis | Marcis Auto Racing | Chevrolet | -* | -* |
Failed to qualify (results unknown)
| 33 | 20 | Dave Mader III | Bahre Racing | Pontiac | -* | -* |
| 34 | 31 | Lee Faulk | Bob Clark Motorsports | Oldsmobile | -* | -* |
| 35 | 70 | J. D. McDuffie | McDuffie Racing | Pontiac | -* | -* |
| 36 | 97 | Rodney Combs | Winkle Motorsports | Buick | -* | -* |
| 37 | 98 | Brad Noffsinger (R) | Curb Racing | Buick | -* | -* |
Official first round qualifying results
Official starting lineup

== Race results ==
| Fin | St | # | Driver | Team | Make | Laps | Led | Status | Pts | Winnings |
|---|---|---|---|---|---|---|---|---|---|---|
| 1 | 20 | 17 | Darrell Waltrip | Hendrick Motorsports | Chevrolet | 500 | 109 | running | 180 | $48,750 |
| 2 | 6 | 7 | Alan Kulwicki | AK Racing | Ford | 500 | 25 | running | 175 | $28,225 |
| 3 | 1 | 27 | Rusty Wallace | Blue Max Racing | Pontiac | 500 | 39 | running | 170 | $26,825 |
| 4 | 19 | 25 | Ken Schrader | Hendrick Motorsports | Chevrolet | 499 | 0 | running | 160 | $13,500 |
| 5 | 3 | 5 | Geoff Bodine | Hendrick Motorsports | Chevrolet | 499 | 0 | running | 155 | $13,050 |
| 6 | 2 | 9 | Bill Elliott | Melling Racing | Ford | 499 | 89 | running | 155 | $15,650 |
| 7 | 5 | 11 | Terry Labonte | Junior Johnson & Associates | Chevrolet | 498 | 0 | running | 146 | $10,550 |
| 8 | 10 | 3 | Dale Earnhardt | Richard Childress Racing | Chevrolet | 498 | 0 | running | 142 | $13,050 |
| 9 | 12 | 6 | Mark Martin | Roush Racing | Ford | 494 | 0 | running | 138 | $6,650 |
| 10 | 13 | 15 | Brett Bodine | Bud Moore Engineering | Ford | 494 | 0 | running | 134 | $12,300 |
| 11 | 29 | 2 | Ernie Irvan (R) | U.S. Racing | Pontiac | 494 | 0 | running | 130 | $5,470 |
| 12 | 9 | 88 | Greg Sacks | Baker–Schiff Racing | Oldsmobile | 494 | 0 | running | 127 | $6,970 |
| 13 | 32 | 71 | Dave Marcis | Marcis Auto Racing | Chevrolet | 494 | 0 | running | 124 | $5,120 |
| 14 | 31 | 8 | Bobby Hillin Jr. | Stavola Brothers Racing | Buick | 490 | 0 | running | 121 | $4,920 |
| 15 | 8 | 67 | Brad Teague | Arrington Racing | Ford | 489 | 0 | running | 0 | $4,620 |
| 16 | 15 | 4 | Rick Wilson | Morgan–McClure Motorsports | Oldsmobile | 489 | 0 | running | 115 | $3,400 |
| 17 | 30 | 10 | Ken Bouchard (R) | Whitcomb Racing | Ford | 488 | 0 | running | 112 | $2,930 |
| 18 | 22 | 28 | Davey Allison | Ranier-Lundy Racing | Ford | 484 | 0 | running | 109 | $10,305 |
| 19 | 4 | 75 | Neil Bonnett | RahMoc Enterprises | Pontiac | 483 | 0 | running | 106 | $8,675 |
| 20 | 17 | 90 | Benny Parsons | Donlavey Racing | Ford | 481 | 0 | running | 103 | $5,050 |
| 21 | 23 | 55 | Phil Parsons | Jackson Bros. Motorsports | Oldsmobile | 476 | 0 | running | 100 | $3,900 |
| 22 | 24 | 21 | Kyle Petty | Wood Brothers Racing | Ford | 472 | 0 | running | 97 | $7,205 |
| 23 | 28 | 52 | Jimmy Means | Jimmy Means Racing | Pontiac | 455 | 0 | running | 94 | $2,970 |
| 24 | 14 | 26 | Ricky Rudd | King Racing | Buick | 423 | 237 | engine | 101 | $6,025 |
| 25 | 7 | 30 | Michael Waltrip | Bahari Racing | Pontiac | 377 | 0 | running | 88 | $4,350 |
| 26 | 18 | 44 | Sterling Marlin | Hagan Racing | Oldsmobile | 339 | 1 | engine | 90 | $3,775 |
| 27 | 27 | 43 | Richard Petty | Petty Enterprises | Pontiac | 313 | 0 | running | 82 | $3,525 |
| 28 | 11 | 83 | Lake Speed | Speed Racing | Oldsmobile | 291 | 0 | engine | 79 | $2,250 |
| 29 | 21 | 12 | Mike Alexander | Stavola Brothers Racing | Buick | 129 | 0 | overheating | 76 | $7,025 |
| 30 | 16 | 33 | Harry Gant | Mach 1 Racing | Chevrolet | 38 | 0 | engine | 73 | $3,010 |
| 31 | 26 | 57 | Morgan Shepherd | Osterlund Racing | Buick | 15 | 0 | crash | 70 | $1,310 |
| 32 | 25 | 29 | Dale Jarrett | Cale Yarborough Motorsports | Oldsmobile | 14 | 0 | engine | 67 | $1,310 |
Failed to qualify (results unknown)
| 33 | | 20 | Dave Mader III | Bahre Racing | Pontiac | | | | | |
| 34 | | 31 | Lee Faulk | Bob Clark Motorsports | Oldsmobile | | | | | |
| 35 | | 70 | J. D. McDuffie | McDuffie Racing | Pontiac | | | | | |
| 36 | | 97 | Rodney Combs | Winkle Motorsports | Buick | | | | | |
| 37 | | 98 | Brad Noffsinger (R) | Curb Racing | Buick | | | | | |
Official race results

== Standings after the race ==
Drivers' Championship standings

| | Pos | Driver | Points |
|---|---|---|---|
| | 1 | Bill Elliott | 3,703 |
| 1 | 2 | Rusty Wallace | 3,579 (-124) |
| 1 | 3 | Dale Earnhardt | 3,563 (-140) |
| | 4 | Terry Labonte | 3,221 (–482) |
| | 5 | Geoff Bodine | 3,203 (–500) |
| | 6 | Ken Schrader | 3,159 (–544) |
| | 7 | Darrell Waltrip | 3,103 (–600) |
| | 8 | Sterling Marlin | 3,008 (–695) |
| | 9 | Phil Parsons | 2,978 (–725) |
| | 10 | Davey Allison | 2,963 (–740) |
Official driver's standings

- Note: Only the first 10 positions are included for the driver standings.

| Previous race: 1988 Delaware 500 | NASCAR Winston Cup Series; 1988 season | Next race: 1988 Oakwood Homes 500 |
