= Manzanita Speedway =

Racing dirt track in Phoenix, Arizona

Coordinates: 33.404137°N 112.131824°W

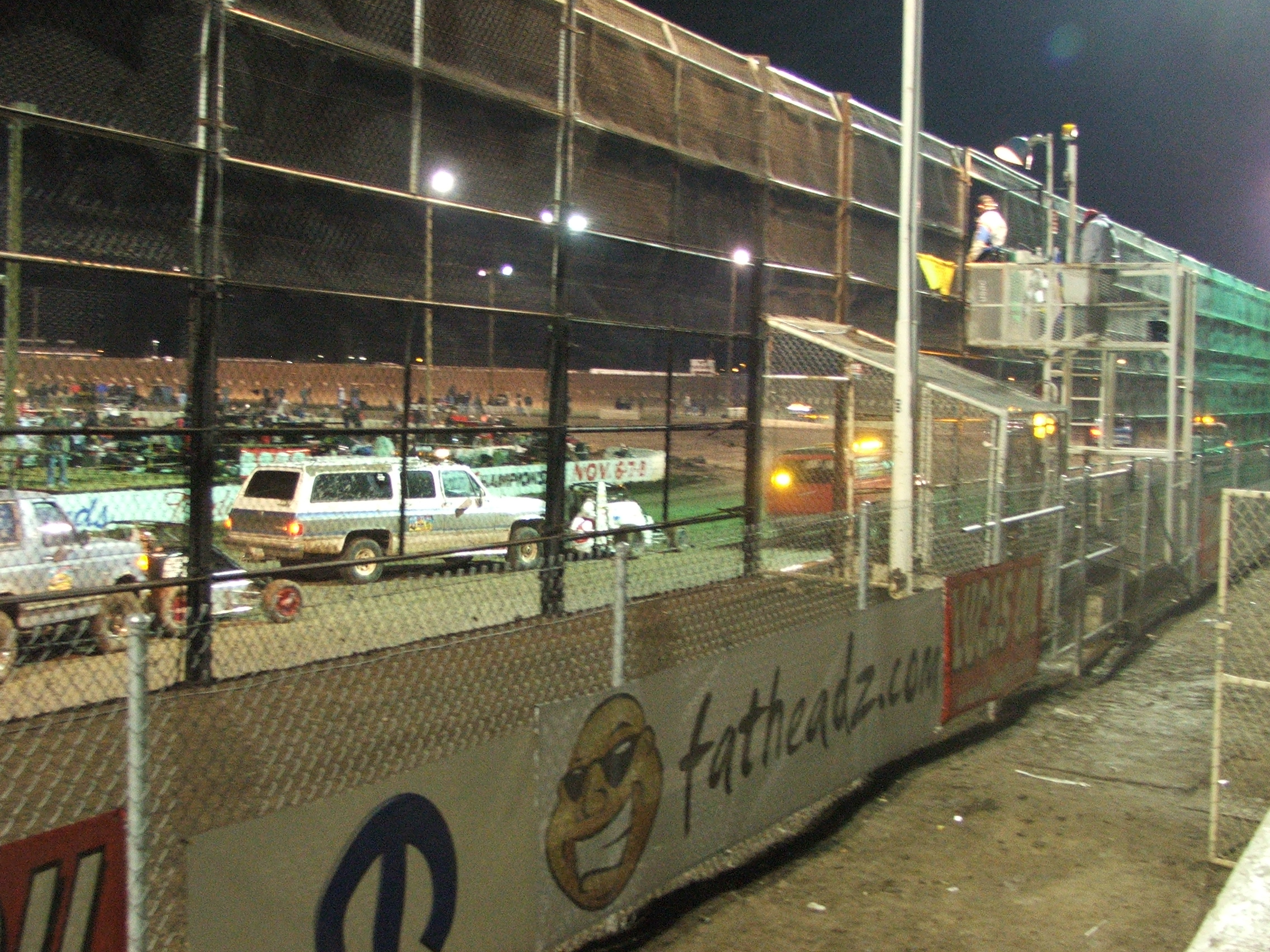
Frontstretch in 2008

The Manzanita Speedway was a dirt track racing facility located in the suburban southwestern part of Phoenix, Arizona, United States. The facility had a 1/3 mile and 1/2 mile tracks. The track held USAC events up through the 2009 Sprint Car season opener. The track was sold to a rigging company and the final race was held on April 11, 2009.

== History ==
Originally a dog racing track known as Manzanita Park, it was converted into a 1/4 mile jalopy race track during the summer of 1951. The first race was held August 25, 1951 in front of 3,923 fans. In 1954, Manzanita added a 1/2 mile track and opened it with a 25-hour marathon race.

In 1965, Keith Hall purchased the facility and renamed it Manzanita Speedway. In 1968, he founded the Western States Championships (now the Western World Championships) at the track, offering an at-the-time generous $10,000 purse. This race became part of the triple crown of sprint car racing.

The track hosted 3 NASCAR Winston West Series races between 1974 and 1975.

Hall sold the track in 1984, but soon repossessed it when the new owners defaulted on the loan. In 2004, Joe and Millie Kimbro took over ownership of the facility.

In 2007, the Kimbros sold the track to the Martin family, well known in the sprint car ranks. The ownership change became effective August 15, 2007.

=== Closure ===
In 2009 the Martins sold the track to Southwest Rigging and the company is set to level the site and use it for parking and equipment storage after closing the doors on April 12, 2009. The final event was the Donnie Davis Memorial. Describing the reason for the sale, Bobby Martin said "I thought we'd get 10 years out of it before we'd have to sell it. But attendance is down 40 percent, and we lost ($468,465) last year ... the nail in the coffin was some environmental issues involving dust and also noise complaints from neighbors. We knew eventually we'd get closed down because of it."

The American Sprint Car Series (ASCS) Regional Tours had to rearrange their schedules for the 2009 season. The Discount Tire Company ASCS Canyon Region had to reschedule some of their 17 events at other speedways. Events were split between Hollywood Hills Speedway in San Felipe Pueblo, New Mexico and USA Raceway in Tucson. The series had competed at the track for over 50 years.

== Races ==
In the 1960s, they had figure eight dirt races that were televised on the local TV channel, KPHO TV Channel 5.

The track hosted over 500 racers each year during 75 to 80 nights of racing. The track featured USAC/CRA sprint cars to bombers.

The track occasionally hosted World of Outlaws events.

== Notable track alumni ==
- Billy Boat
- Lealand McSpadden
- Ron Shuman
- J. J. Yeley
- Butch Beard
