= 1994 AC Delco 500 =

29th race of the 1994 NASCAR Winston Cup Series

Race details
- Race 29 of 31 in the 1994 NASCAR Winston Cup Series
- The 1994 AC Delco 500 program cover, featuring Darrell Waltrip.
- Date: October 23, 1994
- Official name: 30th Annual AC Delco 500
- Location: Rockingham, North Carolina, North Carolina Motor Speedway
- Course: Permanent racing facility
- Course length: 1.017 miles (1.636 km)
- Distance: 492 laps, 500.364 mi (805.257 km)
- Scheduled distance: 492 laps, 500.364 mi (805.257 km)
- Average speed: 126.408 miles per hour (203.434 km/h)
- Attendance: 55,000

Pole position
Driver	Ricky Rudd	Rudd Performance Motorsports
- Time: 23.305

Most laps led
Driver	Dale Earnhardt	Richard Childress Racing
- Laps: 108

Winner
No. 3	Dale Earnhardt	Richard Childress Racing

Television in the United States
- Network: TNN
- Announcers: Mike Joy, Buddy Baker

Radio in the United States
- Radio: Motor Racing Network

The 1994 AC Delco 500 was the 29th stock car race of the 1994 NASCAR Winston Cup Series season and the 30th iteration of the event. The race was held on Sunday, October 23, 1994, in Rockingham, North Carolina, at North Carolina Speedway, a 1.017 miles (1.637 km) permanent high-banked racetrack. The race took the scheduled 492 laps to complete. In the final laps of the race, Richard Childress Racing driver Dale Earnhardt would manage to defend against Precision Products Racing driver Rick Mast to take his 63rd career NASCAR Winston Cup Series victory and his fourth and final victory of the season. To fill out the top three, the aforementioned Rick Mast and Wood Brothers Racing driver Morgan Shepherd would finish second and third, respectively.

With the victory, Earnhardt would manage to mathematically clinch and win a record-tying seventh NASCAR Winston Cup Series championship, which at the time was an achievement only achieved by Richard Petty. Earnhardt had only needed to gain 50 points on second-place driver in the driver's standings, Rusty Wallace. With Earnhardt's win and an early engine issue from Wallace, Earnhardt had managed to gain 127 points on Wallace, thus clinching the championship. The feat would not be matched until 2016, when Jimmie Johnson managed to win his seventh championship at the 2016 Ford EcoBoost 400.

== Background ==
The layout of North Carolina Speedway, the venue where the race was held.

North Carolina Speedway is a 1 mile (1.6 km) flat oval track in Rockingham, North Carolina.

=== Entry list ===
- (R) denotes rookie driver.

#	Driver	Team	Make
1	Rick Mast	Precision Products Racing	Ford
2	Rusty Wallace	Penske Racing South	Ford
02	Brad Noffsinger	Taylor Racing	Ford
3	Dale Earnhardt	Richard Childress Racing	Chevrolet
4	Sterling Marlin	Morgan–McClure Motorsports	Chevrolet
5	Terry Labonte	Hendrick Motorsports	Chevrolet
6	Mark Martin	Roush Racing	Ford
7	Geoff Bodine	Geoff Bodine Racing	Ford
8	Jeff Burton (R)	Stavola Brothers Racing	Ford
10	Ricky Rudd	Rudd Performance Motorsports	Ford
11	Bill Elliott	Junior Johnson & Associates	Ford
12	Derrike Cope	Bobby Allison Motorsports	Ford
14	Randy MacDonald	Hagan Racing	Chevrolet
15	Lake Speed	Bud Moore Engineering	Ford
16	Ted Musgrave	Roush Racing	Ford
17	Darrell Waltrip	Darrell Waltrip Motorsports	Chevrolet
18	Dale Jarrett	Joe Gibbs Racing	Chevrolet
19	Loy Allen Jr. (R)	TriStar Motorsports	Ford
21	Morgan Shepherd	Wood Brothers Racing	Ford
22	Bobby Labonte	Bill Davis Racing	Pontiac
23	Hut Stricklin	Travis Carter Enterprises	Ford
24	Jeff Gordon	Hendrick Motorsports	Chevrolet
25	Ken Schrader	Hendrick Motorsports	Chevrolet
26	Brett Bodine	King Racing	Ford
27	Jimmy Spencer	Junior Johnson & Associates	Ford
28	Kenny Wallace	Robert Yates Racing	Ford
29	Steve Grissom	Diamond Ridge Motorsports	Chevrolet
30	Michael Waltrip	Bahari Racing	Pontiac
31	Ward Burton	A.G. Dillard Motorsports	Chevrolet
32	Dick Trickle	Active Motorsports	Chevrolet
33	Harry Gant	Leo Jackson Motorsports	Chevrolet
40	Bobby Hamilton	SABCO Racing	Pontiac
41	Joe Nemechek (R)	Larry Hedrick Motorsports	Chevrolet
42	Kyle Petty	SABCO Racing	Pontiac
43	John Andretti (R)	Petty Enterprises	Pontiac
47	Billy Standridge (R)	Johnson Standridge Racing	Ford
52	Brad Teague	Jimmy Means Racing	Ford
55	Butch Miller	RaDiUs Motorsports	Ford
61	Rick Carelli	Chesrown Racing	Chevrolet
71	Dave Marcis	Marcis Auto Racing	Chevrolet
75	Todd Bodine	Butch Mock Motorsports	Ford
77	Greg Sacks	U.S. Motorsports Inc.	Ford
84	Norm Benning	Norm Benning Racing	Ford
90	Mike Wallace (R)	Donlavey Racing	Ford
98	Jeremy Mayfield (R)	Cale Yarborough Motorsports	Ford

== Qualifying ==
Qualifying was originally scheduled to be split into two rounds. The first round was scheduled to be held on Thursday, October 20, at 3:00 PM EST. However, after 35 drivers had taken times for qualifying, first-round qualifying was rained out and postponed until Friday, October 21, at 2:00 PM EST. As a result of the rain delay, qualifying was decided to be combined into only one round. For this specific race, positions 1-40 would be decided on time, and depending on who needed it, a select amount of positions were given to cars who had not otherwise qualified but were high enough in owner's points; up to two provisionals were given. If needed, a past champion who did not qualify on either time or provisionals could use a champion's provisional, adding one more spot to the field.

Ricky Rudd, driving for his own Rudd Performance Motorsports team, won the pole, setting a time of 23.305 and an average speed of 157.099 mph (252.826 km/h) in the first round.

Three drivers would fail to qualify.

=== Full qualifying results ===
Pos.	#	Driver	Team	Make	Time	Speed
1	10	Ricky Rudd	Rudd Performance Motorsports	Ford	23.305	157.099
2	5	Terry Labonte	Hendrick Motorsports	Chevrolet	23.334	156.904
3	7	Geoff Bodine	Geoff Bodine Racing	Ford	23.346	156.823
4	12	Derrike Cope	Bobby Allison Motorsports	Ford	23.348	156.810
5	26	Brett Bodine	King Racing	Ford	23.380	156.595
6	21	Morgan Shepherd	Wood Brothers Racing	Ford	23.401	156.455
7	31	Ward Burton (R)	A.G. Dillard Motorsports	Chevrolet	23.411	156.388
8	1	Rick Mast	Precision Products Racing	Ford	23.418	156.341
9	33	Harry Gant	Leo Jackson Motorsports	Chevrolet	23.424	156.301
10	6	Mark Martin	Roush Racing	Ford	23.456	156.088
11	77	Greg Sacks	U.S. Motorsports Inc.	Ford	23.467	156.015
12	71	Dave Marcis	Marcis Auto Racing	Chevrolet	23.496	155.822
13	41	Joe Nemechek (R)	Larry Hedrick Motorsports	Chevrolet	23.501	155.789
14	2	Rusty Wallace	Penske Racing South	Ford	23.545	155.498
15	24	Jeff Gordon	Hendrick Motorsports	Chevrolet	23.563	155.379
16	29	Steve Grissom (R)	Diamond Ridge Motorsports	Chevrolet	23.564	155.373
17	19	Loy Allen Jr. (R)	TriStar Motorsports	Ford	23.567	155.353
18	11	Bill Elliott	Junior Johnson & Associates	Ford	23.597	155.155
19	22	Bobby Labonte	Bill Davis Racing	Pontiac	23.616	155.030
20	3	Dale Earnhardt	Richard Childress Racing	Chevrolet	23.624	154.978
Failed to lock in Round 1
21	32	Dick Trickle	Active Motorsports	Chevrolet	23.621	154.998
22	17	Darrell Waltrip	Darrell Waltrip Motorsports	Chevrolet	23.626	154.965
23	28	Kenny Wallace	Robert Yates Racing	Ford	23.646	154.834
24	25	Ken Schrader	Hendrick Motorsports	Chevrolet	23.654	154.781
25	47	Billy Standridge (R)	Johnson Standridge Racing	Ford	23.662	154.729
26	16	Ted Musgrave	Roush Racing	Ford	23.664	154.716
27	18	Dale Jarrett	Joe Gibbs Racing	Chevrolet	23.692	154.533
28	75	Todd Bodine	Butch Mock Motorsports	Ford	23.702	154.468
29	42	Kyle Petty	SABCO Racing	Pontiac	23.709	154.422
30	8	Jeff Burton (R)	Stavola Brothers Racing	Ford	23.716	154.377
31	90	Mike Wallace (R)	Donlavey Racing	Ford	23.768	154.039
32	27	Jimmy Spencer	Junior Johnson & Associates	Ford	23.798	153.845
33	30	Michael Waltrip	Bahari Racing	Pontiac	23.857	153.464
34	23	Hut Stricklin	Travis Carter Enterprises	Ford	23.859	153.452
35	14	Randy MacDonald	Hagan Racing	Chevrolet	23.863	153.426
36	43	John Andretti (R)	Petty Enterprises	Pontiac	23.878	153.329
37	4	Sterling Marlin	Morgan–McClure Motorsports	Chevrolet	23.911	153.118
38	55	Butch Miller	RaDiUs Motorsports	Ford	23.915	153.092
39	98	Jeremy Mayfield (R)	Cale Yarborough Motorsports	Ford	23.920	153.060
40	61	Rick Carelli	Chesrown Racing	Chevrolet	23.943	152.913
Provisionals
41	15	Lake Speed	Bud Moore Engineering	Ford	-*	-*
42	40	Bobby Hamilton	SABCO Racing	Pontiac	-*	-*
Failed to qualify
43	02	Brad Noffsinger	Taylor Racing	Ford	-*	-*
44	52	Brad Teague	Jimmy Means Racing	Ford	-*	-*
45	84	Norm Benning	Norm Benning Racing	Ford	-*	-*
Official starting lineup

== Race results ==
Fin	St	#	Driver	Team	Make	Laps	Led	Status	Pts	Winnings
1	20	3	Dale Earnhardt	Richard Childress Racing	Chevrolet	492	108	running	185	$60,600
2	8	1	Rick Mast	Precision Products Racing	Ford	492	58	running	175	$45,425
3	6	21	Morgan Shepherd	Wood Brothers Racing	Ford	492	34	running	170	$32,100
4	1	10	Ricky Rudd	Rudd Performance Motorsports	Ford	492	2	running	165	$28,076
5	2	5	Terry Labonte	Hendrick Motorsports	Chevrolet	492	80	running	160	$28,750
6	18	11	Bill Elliott	Junior Johnson & Associates	Ford	492	2	running	155	$20,650
7	10	6	Mark Martin	Roush Racing	Ford	492	0	running	146	$23,850
8	21	32	Dick Trickle	Active Motorsports	Chevrolet	492	1	running	147	$15,625
9	7	31	Ward Burton (R)	A.G. Dillard Motorsports	Chevrolet	491	3	running	143	$12,450
10	41	15	Lake Speed	Bud Moore Engineering	Ford	491	0	running	134	$25,650
11	30	8	Jeff Burton (R)	Stavola Brothers Racing	Ford	490	0	running	130	$18,450
12	27	18	Dale Jarrett	Joe Gibbs Racing	Chevrolet	489	0	running	127	$21,850
13	26	16	Ted Musgrave	Roush Racing	Ford	488	0	running	124	$17,450
14	37	4	Sterling Marlin	Morgan–McClure Motorsports	Chevrolet	488	5	running	126	$20,050
15	23	28	Kenny Wallace	Robert Yates Racing	Ford	488	0	running	118	$20,225
16	31	90	Mike Wallace (R)	Donlavey Racing	Ford	488	0	running	115	$12,750
17	13	41	Joe Nemechek (R)	Larry Hedrick Motorsports	Chevrolet	484	0	running	112	$12,450
18	5	26	Brett Bodine	King Racing	Ford	484	0	running	109	$20,150
19	39	98	Jeremy Mayfield (R)	Cale Yarborough Motorsports	Ford	483	0	running	106	$11,750
20	38	55	Butch Miller	RaDiUs Motorsports	Ford	483	0	running	103	$9,450
21	28	75	Todd Bodine	Butch Mock Motorsports	Ford	481	0	running	100	$11,100
22	40	61	Rick Carelli	Chesrown Racing	Chevrolet	475	0	running	97	$8,400
23	22	17	Darrell Waltrip	Darrell Waltrip Motorsports	Chevrolet	474	0	crash	94	$16,900
24	35	14	Randy MacDonald	Hagan Racing	Chevrolet	466	0	running	91	$8,200
25	36	43	John Andretti (R)	Petty Enterprises	Pontiac	466	0	running	88	$10,500
26	33	30	Michael Waltrip	Bahari Racing	Pontiac	460	0	running	85	$14,300
27	34	23	Hut Stricklin	Travis Carter Enterprises	Ford	459	0	running	82	$13,200
28	19	22	Bobby Labonte	Bill Davis Racing	Pontiac	458	0	engine	79	$13,900
29	15	24	Jeff Gordon	Hendrick Motorsports	Chevrolet	437	101	handling	81	$26,300
30	16	29	Steve Grissom (R)	Diamond Ridge Motorsports	Chevrolet	430	0	running	73	$9,600
31	9	33	Harry Gant	Leo Jackson Motorsports	Chevrolet	398	0	crash	70	$13,400
32	24	25	Ken Schrader	Hendrick Motorsports	Chevrolet	381	40	running	72	$13,300
33	42	40	Bobby Hamilton	SABCO Racing	Pontiac	341	0	handling	64	$11,200
34	12	71	Dave Marcis	Marcis Auto Racing	Chevrolet	334	0	handling	61	$7,100
35	14	2	Rusty Wallace	Penske Racing South	Ford	300	0	engine	58	$19,200
36	29	42	Kyle Petty	SABCO Racing	Pontiac	233	0	crash	55	$20,575
37	4	12	Derrike Cope	Bobby Allison Motorsports	Ford	230	0	engine	52	$10,950
38	32	27	Jimmy Spencer	Junior Johnson & Associates	Ford	202	0	crash	49	$6,925
39	11	77	Greg Sacks	U.S. Motorsports Inc.	Ford	112	0	crash	46	$6,925
40	3	7	Geoff Bodine	Geoff Bodine Racing	Ford	95	58	engine	48	$12,500
41	25	47	Billy Standridge (R)	Johnson Standridge Racing	Ford	39	0	crash	40	$6,950
42	17	19	Loy Allen Jr. (R)	TriStar Motorsports	Ford	25	0	crash	37	$6,900
Official race results

== Standings after the race ==
Drivers' Championship standings

	Pos	Driver	Points
	1	Dale Earnhardt	4,476
	2	Rusty Wallace	4,028 (-448)
	3	Mark Martin	3,890 (-586)
	4	Ken Schrader	3,812 (–664)
	5	Ricky Rudd	3,778 (–698)
	6	Morgan Shepherd	3,752 (–724)
1	7	Terry Labonte	3,549 (–927)
2	8	Bill Elliott	3,505 (–971)
2	9	Jeff Gordon	3,493 (–983)
1	10	Darrell Waltrip	3,454 (–1,022)
Official driver's standings

- Note: Only the first 10 positions are included for the driver standings.

Previous race: 1994 Mello Yello 500	NASCAR Winston Cup Series; 1994 season	Next race: 1994 Slick 50 500
