= Lealand McSpadden =

American racing driver (born 1946)

Lealand McSpadden (born July 16, 1946) is an American former dirt track racing driver who competed mostly in sprint and midget cars. He was nicknamed "the Tempe Tornado".

== Career ==
Born in Gallup, New Mexico, McSpadden's family moved to Tempe, a suburb of Phoenix, Arizona, in 1954. He began racing in 1968 with a supermodified bought from local racer Billy Shuman. He recorded his first sprint car feature race win at Manzanita Speedway in 1972.

McSpadden's 26-year career included nearly 200 feature wins, including 25 in five different divisions at Manzanita during the 1977 season. His awards are numerous; he is a three-time winner of the Western World Championship for sprint cars (1978, 1993, 1995) and he won the 1991 Chili Bowl midget car event. He also entered and won the Belleville Midget National Championships on the high banks in 1992.

As well as racing in the United States, McSpadden was a frequent visitor to Australia, where he made guest appearances at "Australia vs the USA" nights at Parramatta City Raceway. He also won the 1995 Australian Speedcar Grand Prix (Midgets are called Speedcars in Australia), joining other American winners of the event including Cal Niday, Bob Tattersall, Jimmy Davies, Dave Strickland, A. J. Foyt, Ron "Sleepy" Tripp, Steve Kinser and Johnny Pearson.

One particular race at Silver Dollar Speedway in Chico, California, saw McSpadden crash out in his heat. He was badly shaken and his car took severe damage but promoter J.W. Hunt offered to add $1,000 to the winner's purse if McSpadden could come back through the qualifying B-main race and win the main event. He won both the B-main and the main event to win the increased purse.

McSpadden retired from competitive racing in 1996 after winning the SCRA non-winged sprint car championship, having announced that he would be diverting his attention to the NASCAR SuperTruck Series (which would later become the Craftsman Truck Series).

== Awards ==
In 1998, McSpadden was inducted into the Arizona Motorsports Hall of Fame. He was inducted in the National Sprint Car Hall of Fame in 1999. In 2000, the Arizona Republic named him the fifth-greatest driver from that state in the past 100 years.

Sporting positions
Preceded by Ron Shuman	California Roadster Association Champion; 1992	Succeeded by Mike Kirby
