= 1994 Mello Yello 500 =

28th race of the 1994 NASCAR Winston Cup Series

Race details
- Race 28 of 31 in the 1994 NASCAR Winston Cup Series
- The 1994 Mello Yello 500 program cover, with artwork by NASCAR artist Sam Bass.
- Date: October 9, 1994
- Official name: 35th Annual Mello Yello 500
- Location: Concord, North Carolina, Charlotte Motor Speedway
- Course: Permanent racing facility
- Course length: 1.5 miles (2.41 km)
- Distance: 334 laps, 501 mi (806.281 km)
- Scheduled distance: 334 laps, 501 mi (806.281 km)
- Average speed: 145.922 miles per hour (234.839 km/h)
- Attendance: 170,000

Pole position
Driver	Ward Burton	A.G. Dillard Motorsports
- Time: 29.070

Most laps led
Driver	Geoff Bodine	Geoff Bodine Racing
- Laps: 202

Winner
No. 18	Dale Jarrett	Joe Gibbs Racing

Television in the United States
- Network: TBS
- Announcers: Ken Squier, Chuck Bown, Cale Yarborough

Radio in the United States
- Radio: Performance Racing Network

The 1994 Mello Yello 500 was the 28th stock car race of the 1994 NASCAR Winston Cup Series and the 35th iteration of the event. The race was held on Sunday, October 9, 1994, in Concord, North Carolina, at Charlotte Motor Speedway, a 1.5 miles (2.4 km) permanent quad-oval. The race took the scheduled 334 laps to complete. In the final restart of the race with four to go, Joe Gibbs Racing driver Dale Jarrett would manage to defend the field for the next three laps before a caution on the final lap ended the race, handing Jarrett the victory. The victory was Jarrett's third NASCAR Winston Cup Series victory of his career and his only victory of the season. To fill out the top three, Wood Brothers Racing driver Morgan Shepherd and Richard Childress Racing driver Dale Earnhardt would finish second and third, respectively.

Heading into the 1994 AC Delco 500, Dale Earnhardt was the extremely heavy favorite to win the driver's championship, only needing to be ahead of second-place driver, Rusty Wallace by 371 points at the finish of the race to mathematically clinch the championship.

== Background ==
The layout of Charlotte Motor Speedway, the venue where the race was held.

Charlotte Motor Speedway is a motorsports complex located in Concord, North Carolina, United States 13 miles from Charlotte, North Carolina. The complex features a 1.5 mile (2.4 km) quad oval track that hosts NASCAR racing including the prestigious Coca-Cola 600 on Memorial Day weekend and the NEXTEL All-Star Challenge, as well as the UAW-GM Quality 500. The speedway was built in 1959 by Bruton Smith and is considered the home track for NASCAR with many race teams located in the Charlotte area. The track is owned and operated by Speedway Motorsports Inc. (SMI) with Marcus G. Smith (son of Bruton Smith) as track president.

=== Entry list ===
- (R) denotes rookie driver.

#	Driver	Team	Make
0	Delma Cowart	H. L. Waters Racing	Ford
1	Rick Mast	Precision Products Racing	Ford
2	Rusty Wallace	Penske Racing South	Ford
02	Brad Noffsinger	Taylor Racing	Ford
3	Dale Earnhardt	Richard Childress Racing	Chevrolet
4	Sterling Marlin	Morgan–McClure Motorsports	Chevrolet
5	Terry Labonte	Hendrick Motorsports	Chevrolet
6	Mark Martin	Roush Racing	Ford
7	Geoff Bodine	Geoff Bodine Racing	Ford
8	Jeff Burton (R)	Stavola Brothers Racing	Ford
9	Phil Parsons	Melling Racing	Ford
10	Ricky Rudd	Rudd Performance Motorsports	Ford
11	Bill Elliott	Junior Johnson & Associates	Ford
12	Derrike Cope	Bobby Allison Motorsports	Ford
15	Lake Speed	Bud Moore Engineering	Ford
16	Ted Musgrave	Roush Racing	Ford
17	Darrell Waltrip	Darrell Waltrip Motorsports	Chevrolet
18	Dale Jarrett	Joe Gibbs Racing	Chevrolet
19	Loy Allen Jr. (R)	TriStar Motorsports	Ford
20	Jimmy Hensley	Moroso Racing	Ford
21	Morgan Shepherd	Wood Brothers Racing	Ford
22	Bobby Labonte	Bill Davis Racing	Pontiac
23	Hut Stricklin	Travis Carter Enterprises	Ford
24	Jeff Gordon	Hendrick Motorsports	Chevrolet
25	Ken Schrader	Hendrick Motorsports	Chevrolet
26	Brett Bodine	King Racing	Ford
27	Jimmy Spencer	Junior Johnson & Associates	Ford
28	Ernie Irvan	Robert Yates Racing	Ford
29	Steve Grissom	Diamond Ridge Motorsports	Chevrolet
30	Michael Waltrip	Bahari Racing	Pontiac
31	Ward Burton	A.G. Dillard Motorsports	Chevrolet
32	Dick Trickle	Active Motorsports	Chevrolet
33	Harry Gant	Leo Jackson Motorsports	Chevrolet
40	Bobby Hamilton	SABCO Racing	Pontiac
41	Joe Nemechek (R)	Larry Hedrick Motorsports	Chevrolet
42	Kyle Petty	SABCO Racing	Pontiac
43	John Andretti (R)	Petty Enterprises	Pontiac
44	Bobby Hillin Jr.	Charles Hardy Racing	Ford
45	Rich Bickle (R)	Terminal Trucking Motorsports	Ford
47	Billy Standridge (R)	Johnson Standridge Racing	Ford
52	Brad Teague	Jimmy Means Racing	Ford
53	Kirk Shelmerdine	Jimmy Means Racing	Ford
54	Robert Pressley	Leo Jackson Motorsports	Chevrolet
55	Butch Miller	RaDiUs Motorsports	Ford
67	Ken Bouchard	Cunningham Racing	Ford
71	Dave Marcis	Marcis Auto Racing	Chevrolet
75	Todd Bodine	Butch Mock Motorsports	Ford
77	Greg Sacks	U.S. Motorsports Inc.	Ford
78	Pancho Carter	Triad Motorsports	Ford
80	Joe Ruttman	Hover Motorsports	Ford
84	Norm Benning	Norm Benning Racing	Oldsmobile
90	Mike Wallace (R)	Donlavey Racing	Ford
95	Ben Hess	Sadler Brothers Racing	Ford
98	Jeremy Mayfield (R)	Cale Yarborough Motorsports	Ford

== Qualifying ==
Qualifying was split into two rounds. The first round was held on Wednesday, October 5, at 7:00 PM EST. Each driver would have one lap to set a time. During the first round, the top 20 drivers in the round would be guaranteed a starting spot in the race. If a driver was not able to guarantee a spot in the first round, they had the option to scrub their time from the first round and try and run a faster lap time in a second round qualifying run, held on Thursday, October 6, at 1:30 PM EST. As with the first round, each driver would have one lap to set a time. For this specific race, positions 21-40 would be decided on time, and depending on who needed it, a select amount of positions were given to cars who had not otherwise qualified but were high enough in owner's points; up to two provisionals were given. If needed, a past champion who did not qualify on either time or provisionals could use a champion's provisional, adding one more spot to the field.

Ward Burton, driving for A.G. Dillard Motorsports, won the pole, setting a time of 29.070 and an average speed of 185.759 mph (298.950 km/h) in the first round.

12 drivers would fail to qualify.

=== Full qualifying results ===
Pos.	#	Driver	Team	Make	Time	Speed
1	31	Ward Burton (R)	A.G. Dillard Motorsports	Chevrolet	29.070	185.759
2	30	Michael Waltrip	Bahari Racing	Pontiac	29.295	184.332
3	43	John Andretti (R)	Petty Enterprises	Pontiac	29.368	183.874
4	41	Joe Nemechek (R)	Larry Hedrick Motorsports	Chevrolet	29.375	183.830
5	24	Jeff Gordon	Hendrick Motorsports	Chevrolet	29.423	183.530
6	7	Geoff Bodine	Geoff Bodine Racing	Ford	29.450	183.362
7	12	Derrike Cope	Bobby Allison Motorsports	Ford	29.506	183.014
8	26	Brett Bodine	King Racing	Ford	29.521	182.921
9	5	Terry Labonte	Hendrick Motorsports	Chevrolet	29.522	182.914
10	32	Dick Trickle	Active Motorsports	Chevrolet	29.551	182.735
11	25	Ken Schrader	Hendrick Motorsports	Chevrolet	29.605	182.402
12	6	Mark Martin	Roush Racing	Ford	29.652	182.113
13	90	Mike Wallace (R)	Donlavey Racing	Ford	29.658	182.076
14	77	Greg Sacks	U.S. Motorsports Inc.	Ford	29.680	181.941
15	2	Rusty Wallace	Penske Racing South	Ford	29.695	181.849
16	10	Ricky Rudd	Rudd Performance Motorsports	Ford	29.746	181.537
17	75	Todd Bodine	Butch Mock Motorsports	Ford	29.765	181.421
18	33	Harry Gant	Leo Jackson Motorsports	Chevrolet	29.787	181.287
19	1	Rick Mast	Precision Products Racing	Ford	29.801	181.202
20	22	Bobby Labonte	Bill Davis Racing	Pontiac	29.801	181.202
Failed to lock in Round 1
21	28	Kenny Wallace	Robert Yates Racing	Ford	29.713	181.739
22	18	Dale Jarrett	Joe Gibbs Racing	Chevrolet	29.806	181.172
23	4	Sterling Marlin	Morgan–McClure Motorsports	Chevrolet	29.817	181.105
24	15	Lake Speed	Bud Moore Engineering	Ford	29.829	181.032
25	27	Jimmy Spencer	Junior Johnson & Associates	Ford	29.835	180.995
26	40	Bobby Hamilton	SABCO Racing	Pontiac	29.854	180.880
27	21	Morgan Shepherd	Wood Brothers Racing	Ford	29.855	180.874
28	11	Bill Elliott	Junior Johnson & Associates	Ford	29.859	180.850
29	16	Ted Musgrave	Roush Racing	Ford	29.870	180.783
30	80	Joe Ruttman	Hover Motorsports	Ford	29.870	180.783
31	8	Jeff Burton (R)	Stavola Brothers Racing	Ford	29.888	180.675
32	98	Jeremy Mayfield (R)	Cale Yarborough Motorsports	Ford	29.894	180.638
33	23	Hut Stricklin	Travis Carter Enterprises	Ford	29.909	180.548
34	19	Loy Allen Jr. (R)	TriStar Motorsports	Ford	29.911	180.536
35	17	Darrell Waltrip	Darrell Waltrip Motorsports	Chevrolet	29.918	180.493
36	44	Bobby Hillin Jr.	Charles Hardy Racing	Ford	29.923	180.463
37	47	Billy Standridge (R)	Johnson Standridge Racing	Ford	29.928	180.433
38	3	Dale Earnhardt	Richard Childress Racing	Chevrolet	29.932	180.409
39	20	Jimmy Hensley	Moroso Racing	Ford	29.988	180.072
40	54	Robert Pressley	Leo Jackson Motorsports	Chevrolet	30.020	179.880
Provisionals
41	42	Kyle Petty	SABCO Racing	Pontiac	-*	-*
42	29	Steve Grissom (R)	Diamond Ridge Motorsports	Chevrolet	-*	-*
Failed to qualify
43	71	Dave Marcis	Marcis Auto Racing	Chevrolet	-*	-*
44	9	Phil Parsons	Melling Racing	Ford	-*	-*
45	67	Ken Bouchard	Cunningham Racing	Ford	-*	-*
46	55	Butch Miller	RaDiUs Motorsports	Ford	-*	-*
47	02	Brad Noffsinger	Taylor Racing	Ford	-*	-*
48	52	Brad Teague	Jimmy Means Racing	Ford	-*	-*
49	78	Pancho Carter	Triad Motorsports	Ford	-*	-*
50	53	Kirk Shelmerdine	Jimmy Means Racing	Ford	-*	-*
51	84	Norm Benning	Norm Benning Racing	Oldsmobile	-*	-*
52	95	Ben Hess	Sadler Brothers Racing	Ford	-*	-*
53	45	Rich Bickle (R)	Terminal Trucking Motorsports	Ford	-*	-*
54	0	Delma Cowart	H. L. Waters Racing	Ford	-*	-*
Official first round qualifying results
Official starting lineup

== Race results ==
Fin	St	#	Driver	Team	Make	Laps	Led	Status	Pts	Winnings
1	22	18	Dale Jarrett	Joe Gibbs Racing	Chevrolet	334	4	running	180	$106,800
2	27	21	Morgan Shepherd	Wood Brothers Racing	Ford	334	15	running	175	$71,900
3	38	3	Dale Earnhardt	Richard Childress Racing	Chevrolet	334	6	running	170	$66,000
4	11	25	Ken Schrader	Hendrick Motorsports	Chevrolet	334	13	running	165	$47,800
5	24	15	Lake Speed	Bud Moore Engineering	Ford	334	0	running	155	$42,925
6	8	26	Brett Bodine	King Racing	Ford	334	13	running	155	$37,450
7	9	5	Terry Labonte	Hendrick Motorsports	Chevrolet	334	0	running	146	$32,850
8	7	12	Derrike Cope	Bobby Allison Motorsports	Ford	334	0	running	142	$28,100
9	35	17	Darrell Waltrip	Darrell Waltrip Motorsports	Chevrolet	334	11	running	143	$29,200
10	2	30	Michael Waltrip	Bahari Racing	Pontiac	333	0	crash	134	$31,450
11	4	41	Joe Nemechek (R)	Larry Hedrick Motorsports	Chevrolet	333	0	running	130	$19,300
12	19	1	Rick Mast	Precision Products Racing	Ford	333	0	running	127	$19,700
13	10	32	Dick Trickle	Active Motorsports	Chevrolet	333	0	running	124	$14,500
14	21	28	Kenny Wallace	Robert Yates Racing	Ford	332	1	running	126	$22,100
15	36	44	Bobby Hillin Jr.	Charles Hardy Racing	Ford	331	2	crash	123	$9,750
16	25	27	Jimmy Spencer	Junior Johnson & Associates	Ford	331	0	running	115	$10,800
17	13	90	Mike Wallace (R)	Donlavey Racing	Ford	331	0	running	112	$10,600
18	29	16	Ted Musgrave	Roush Racing	Ford	331	0	running	109	$13,500
19	26	40	Bobby Hamilton	SABCO Racing	Pontiac	330	0	running	106	$13,100
20	32	98	Jeremy Mayfield (R)	Cale Yarborough Motorsports	Ford	330	0	running	103	$9,350
21	33	23	Hut Stricklin	Travis Carter Enterprises	Ford	330	0	running	100	$8,350
22	18	33	Harry Gant	Leo Jackson Motorsports	Chevrolet	329	0	running	97	$12,070
23	30	80	Joe Ruttman	Hover Motorsports	Ford	328	0	running	94	$5,690
24	3	43	John Andretti (R)	Petty Enterprises	Pontiac	328	30	running	96	$11,125
25	31	8	Jeff Burton (R)	Stavola Brothers Racing	Ford	328	0	running	88	$11,390
26	42	29	Steve Grissom (R)	Diamond Ridge Motorsports	Chevrolet	327	0	running	85	$7,265
27	34	19	Loy Allen Jr. (R)	TriStar Motorsports	Ford	325	0	running	82	$5,150
28	5	24	Jeff Gordon	Hendrick Motorsports	Chevrolet	324	3	crash	84	$16,730
29	16	10	Ricky Rudd	Rudd Performance Motorsports	Ford	324	0	crash	76	$10,420
30	41	42	Kyle Petty	SABCO Racing	Pontiac	308	1	running	78	$16,015
31	40	54	Robert Pressley	Leo Jackson Motorsports	Chevrolet	303	0	running	70	$4,720
32	6	7	Geoff Bodine	Geoff Bodine Racing	Ford	290	202	engine	77	$31,340
33	28	11	Bill Elliott	Junior Johnson & Associates	Ford	289	0	running	64	$8,565
34	37	47	Billy Standridge (R)	Johnson Standridge Racing	Ford	277	0	running	61	$4,540
35	14	77	Greg Sacks	U.S. Motorsports Inc.	Ford	266	1	engine	63	$4,515
36	23	4	Sterling Marlin	Morgan–McClure Motorsports	Chevrolet	257	2	engine	60	$14,490
37	15	2	Rusty Wallace	Penske Racing South	Ford	256	1	timing chain	57	$16,680
38	17	75	Todd Bodine	Butch Mock Motorsports	Ford	199	0	handling	49	$4,470
39	12	6	Mark Martin	Roush Racing	Ford	156	0	engine	46	$16,260
40	39	20	Jimmy Hensley	Moroso Racing	Ford	76	0	crash	43	$4,455
41	1	31	Ward Burton (R)	A.G. Dillard Motorsports	Chevrolet	29	29	crash	45	$29,655
42	20	22	Bobby Labonte	Bill Davis Racing	Pontiac	4	0	crash	37	$8,455
Official race results

== Standings after the race ==
Drivers' Championship standings

	Pos	Driver	Points
	1	Dale Earnhardt	4,291
	2	Rusty Wallace	3,970 (-321)
	3	Mark Martin	3,744 (-547)
	4	Ken Schrader	3,740 (–551)
	5	Ricky Rudd	3,613 (–678)
	6	Morgan Shepherd	3,582 (–709)
	7	Jeff Gordon	3,412 (–879)
1	8	Terry Labonte	3,389 (–902)
1	9	Darrell Waltrip	3,360 (–931)
2	10	Bill Elliott	3,350 (–941)
Official driver's standings

- Note: Only the first 10 positions are included for the driver standings.

Previous race: 1994 Tyson Holly Farms 400	NASCAR Winston Cup Series; 1994 season	Next race: 1994 AC Delco 500
