= California Roadster Association =

US racing governing body

California Racing Association
- Sport: Oval track racing
- Category: auto racing
- Jurisdiction: California United States
- Abbreviation: CRA
- Founded: 1945
- Headquarters: Ascot Park
- President: Babe Ouse
- Closure date: 1994
- (United States)

The California Racing Association (CRA) was a racing governing body which set rules and hosted Sprint car racing events in Southern California.

The association was formed in the garage of Babe Ouse in 1945. Originally it was called the California Roadster Association. Ouse, a dry lakes record holder in a Marmon, was tired of racing against the clock and, with the help of Bill Dehler and Emmett Malloy built a race track blocks away from the dirt lot that would become Ascot Park. That first track was known as Carrell Speedway and Judge Carrell & Christopher J.C. Agajanian were the driving forces behind both tracks and the CRA itself. Sprint cars were introduced in 1953 and the name was changed in 1957 to the California Racing Association, or CRA.

In 1978, Gary Sokola became president and instituted several new safety measures, including the national 410 limit, the tire rule and padded roll cages. Sokola left the CRA to join the USAC and Frank Lewis took over. He would be the last president, as things declined for the sport shortly thereafter. Ascot raceway closed in 1990 and the CRA was left without a home track. Lewis tried expanding the sport across the state and various parts of the country, increasing the purse and spending thousands on advertising out of his pocket to keep the show going.

In 1993, a scheduled race was cancelled at the Ventura Raceway. A majority of members formed the SCRA and honored the date. The CRA was suspended indefinitely in 1994 after just four races, with Bobby Michnowicz leading the point standings by one point over Leland McSpadden. No Champion was crowned.

== Legends ==
Many sprint car legends have come from the ranks of CRA. Stars include Bob Hogle, Billy Wilkerson, Jimmy Oskie, Bobby Olivero, Rick Goudy, Buster Venard, Dean Thompson, Bubby Jones, Brad Noffsinger, Eddie Wirth, Rip Williams, John Redican, Ron Shuman, Lealand McSpadden, Richard Griffin, Billy Boat, Mike Kirby, Mike Sweeney, Stan McElrath and many more. The CRA became a natural stepping stone to more sophisticated racing, including the Indy 500, as 19 winners of the Indy 500 got their starts from track roadster racing.

== Presidents ==
Year	President
1945	Johnny Walker
—	Babe Ouse
—	Tom Sloan
1950–1970	Walt James
1971	Ed Hudson
1972–1977	Don Peabody
1977–1978	Joe Hunt
1978	David Voden
1978	Gary Sokola
— 1992	Frank Lewis

== CRA Champion drivers ==
Year	Champion
1946	Jack McGrath
1947	Troy Ruttman
1948	Troy Ruttman
1949	George Seeger
1950	Bob Denny
1951	Bob Denny
1952	Harry Stockman
1953	Nick Valenta
1954	Jack Gardner
1955	Nick Valenta
1956	Art Bisch
1957	Nick Valenta
1958	Roy Prosser
1959	Chuck Hulse
1960	Don Davis
1961	Jack Brunner
1962	Colby Scroggins
1963	Bob Hogle
1964	Hal Minyard
1965	Hal Minyard
1966	Don Thomas
1967	Billy Wilkerson
1968	Bob Hogle
1969	Jimmy Oskie
1970	Billy Wilkerson
1971	Dick Zimmerman
1972	Stan McElrath
1973	Don Hamilton
1974	Jimmy Oskie
1975	Bobby Olivero
1976	Jimmy Oskie
1977	Jimmy Oskie
1978	Rick Goudy
1979	Jimmy Oskie
1980	Dean Thompson
1981	Dean Thompson
1982	Dean Thompson
1983	Bubby Jones
1984	Bubby Jones
1985	Eddie Wirth
1986	Brad Noffsinger
1987	Brad Noffsinger
1988	Ron Shuman
1989	Ron Shuman
1990	Ron Shuman
1991	Ron Shuman
1992	Lealand McSpadden
1993	Mike Kirby
1994	Bobby Michnowicz
