= Ron Shuman =

American racing driver (born 1952)

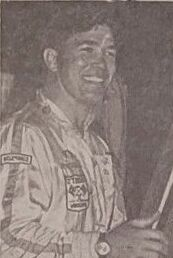
Shuman circa 1975

Ronald Wayne Shuman (born September 15, 1952) is an American sprint car race driver from Tempe, Arizona.

Shuman won the Turkey Night Grand Prix, a major event in the midget cars series, on eight occasions in 1979, 1980, 1981, 1982, 1984, 1987, 1992 and 1993. He won the Knoxville Nationals in 1979. He tried his hand at Championship Car racing in 1980 and finished in 11th place in his first race at Ontario Motor Speedway in April of that year. However, a month later he failed to qualify for the 1980 Indianapolis 500. In 1981, Shuman sided with USAC in their split with CART and Shuman entered in two dirt track races on USAC's "Gold Crown" Champ Car calendar, failing to qualify for one and finishing 15th in the other. The following season in 1982, Shuman notched his best Champ Car finish at the Illinois State Fairgrounds Racetrack with a fifth place and competed in two other dirt track Gold Crown races. He made another appearance in 1983 before the series ended. Shuman continued to race sprint cars during his foray into Champ Car and still makes occasional appearances in major sprint car events to this day.

Shuman was a regular on the World of Outlaws sprint car series for a number of years 1979–1987. His best finish was third in points twice and had 14 series wins. In 1988, Shuman left the WoO series and joined the California Racing Association wingless series. He promptly won four championships in a row 1988–1991. He won 69 CRA races. Ron then raced with the SCRA series that replaced the CRA. He won titles in 1994, 1996, and 1997.

Shuman ran occasional USAC Silver Crown events and took the checkered flag three times.

Shuman was inducted into the National Sprint Car Hall of Fame in 2003.

A race named in honor of Shuman, The Ron Shuman Classic, is held every year in Kansas City, Kansas at Lakeside Speedway.

Sporting positions
Preceded by Brad Noffsinger	California Roadster Association Champion; 1988, 1989, 1990, 1991	Succeeded by Lealand McSpadden
