= Brad Noffsinger =

American racing driver (born 1960)

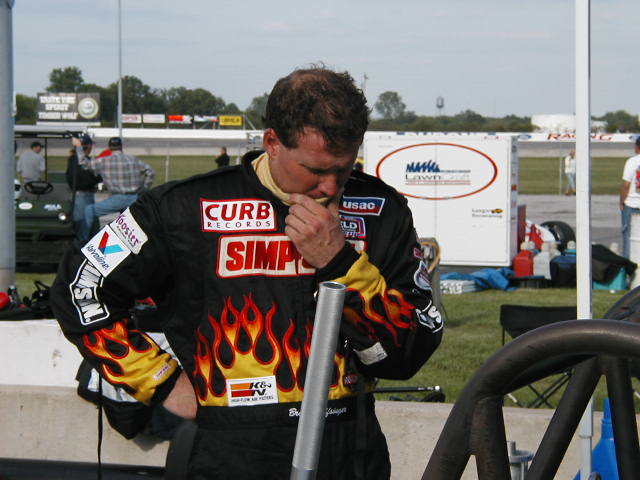
- Noffsinger at IRP in 2003
- Born: August 29, 1960 (age 66); Huntington Beach, California, U.S.
- Achievements: 1986, 1987 California Roadster Association Champion

NASCAR Cup Series career
- 17 races run over 1 year
- Best finish: 36th (1988)
- First race: 1988 Motorcraft Quality Parts 500 (Atlanta)
- Last race: 1988 Atlanta Journal 500 (Atlanta)
Wins	Top tens	Poles
0	0	0

NASCAR O'Reilly Auto Parts Series career
- 5 races run over 1 year
- Best finish: 63rd (1998)
- First race: 1998 Carquest Auto Parts 300 (Charlotte)
- Last race: 1998 Autolite Platinum 250 (Richmond International Raceway)
Wins	Top tens	Poles
0	0	0

Brad Noffsinger (born August 29, 1960) is an American professional stock car racing driver and crew chief. Now retired as a driver, he formerly competed in the NASCAR Winston Cup Series and Busch Series; following his stock car racing career, he served as a crew chief in the Winston Cup Series and has competed in USAC open-wheel competition.

== Personal life ==
Noffsinger is the son of business owner and engineer Ace Noffsinger and mother Patty. He has two younger brothers Bart and Todd and grew up with a passion for toy cars. Both brothers competed in CRA Sprint Cars and USAC Midgets. He is a graduate of Cypress (CA) High School.

== Racing career ==
Noffsinger attempted to qualify in 1987 for the 1987 Winston Western 500 but failed to do so. Noffsinger only led a single lap in his career while completing a total of 3555 laps or 5,515.9 miles (8,877.0 km) in his Cup career. During the 1988 NASCAR Winston Cup Series, Noffsinger would fail to qualify eight different times. His ambitions to race in the highest level of American stock car racing was ultimately marred by seven DNFs. He competed in the first NASCAR race held outside North America, the 1988 Goodyear NASCAR 500 at Australia's Calder Park Thunderdome, finishing 22nd due to an accident 80 laps into the event.

During the 1994 Cup Series season, Noffsinger would attempt to qualify at the 1994 Mello Yello 500, the 1994 AC Delco 500 and the 1994 Slick 50 500. None of these attempts resulted in qualifying for the race.

Road courses were Noffsinger's specialties, where he would finish an average of fifteenth place. His Achilles heel was at most intermediate tracks where a finish of 30th place was considered to be typical.

Following his racing career, Noffsinger became a crew chief at the NASCAR Winston Cup level, working with Team Sabco during the mid-to-late 1990s.

== Post-NASCAR career ==
After retiring from NASCAR for good, Noffsinger joined the personnel of the Richard Petty Driving Experience at Walt Disney World Speedway where he teaches casual tourists and NASCAR fans alike how to operate the four-gear manual transmission stock cars. He has been employed with this organization for several years and continues to serve his role as an instructor there.

From 1999 to 2004, Noffsinger became an owner/occasional driver at the USAC Silver Crown; where he competes and helps younger driver learn the race car driving trade. The team folded up due to financial issues.

In 2013, Noffsinger served as the stunt driver for the viral video Pepsi MAX & Jeff Gordon Present: Test Drive.

== Motorsports career results ==
=== NASCAR ===
(key) (Bold – Pole position awarded by qualifying time. Italics – Pole position earned by points standings or practice time. * – Most laps led.)

==== Winston Cup Series ====
NASCAR Winston Cup Series results
Year	Team	No.	Make	1	2	3	4	5	6	7	8	9	10	11	12	13	14	15	16	17	18	19	20	21	22	23	24	25	26	27	28	29	30	31	NWCC	Pts	Ref
1987	Curb Racing	98	Chevy	DAY	CAR	RCH	ATL	DAR	NWS	BRI	MAR	TAL	CLT	DOV	POC	RSD	MCH	DAY	POC	TAL	GLN	MCH	BRI	DAR	RCH	DOV	MAR	NWS	CLT	CAR	RSD; DNQ	ATL			N/A	0	
1988	Curb Racing	98	Buick	DAY	RCH	CAR	ATL; 14	DAR; 36	BRI; DNQ	NWS; DNQ	MAR; 21	TAL; 25	CLT; 33	DOV; 24	RSD	POC; 19	MCH; 20	DAY; DNQ	POC; 19	TAL; 22	GLN; 15	MCH; 26	BRI; 32	DAR; DNQ	RCH; DNQ	DOV; 34	MAR; DNQ	CLT; DNQ	NWS; DNQ	CAR; 37	PHO; 26	ATL; 26			36th	1316	
1989	Jaehne Motorsports	76	Pontiac	DAY; DNQ	CAR	ATL	RCH	DAR	BRI	NWS	MAR	TAL	CLT	DOV	SON	POC	MCH	DAY	POC	TAL	GLN	MCH	BRI	DAR	RCH	DOV	MAR	CLT	NWS	CAR	PHO	ATL			N/A	0	
1994	Taylor Racing	02	Ford	DAY	CAR	RCH	ATL	DAR	BRI	NWS	MAR	TAL	SON	CLT	DOV	POC	MCH	DAY	NHA	POC	TAL	IND	GLN	MCH	BRI	DAR	RCH	DOV	MAR	NWS	CLT; DNQ	CAR; DNQ	PHO; DNQ	ATL	N/A	0	

==== Busch Series ====
NASCAR Busch Series results
Year	Team	No.	Make	1	2	3	4	5	6	7	8	9	10	11	12	13	14	15	16	17	18	19	20	21	22	23	24	25	26	27	28	29	30	31	NBSC	Pts	Ref
1994		69	Chevy	DAY	CAR	RCH	ATL	MAR	DAR	HCY	BRI	ROU	NHA	NZH	CLT	DOV	MYB	GLN	MLW	SBO	TAL	HCY	IRP; DNQ	MCH	BRI	DAR	RCH	DOV	CLT	MAR	CAR				NA	-	
1998	Curb Racing	43	Ford	DAY	CAR	LVS	NSV	DAR	BRI	TEX	HCY	TAL	NHA	NZH	CLT; 36													RCH; 40	DOV	CLT	GTY	CAR	ATL	HOM	63rd	305	
1998	Curb Racing	43	Chevy													DOV; 27	RCH	PPR; 29	GLN	MLW	MYB	CAL; 38	SBO	IRP; DNQ	MCH	BRI	DAR								63rd	305	

Sporting positions
Preceded by Eddie Wirth	California Roadster Association Champion; 1986, 1987	Succeeded by Ron Shuman
