= 1986 Sovran Bank 500 =

Eighth race of the 1986 NASCAR Winston Cup Series

Race details
- Race 8 of 29 in the 1986 NASCAR Winston Cup Series
- The 1986 Sovran Bank 500 program cover, featuring Bill Elliott and Darrell Waltrip robbing a bank.
- Date: April 27, 1986
- Official name: 37th Annual Sovran Bank 500
- Location: Martinsville, Virginia, Martinsville Speedway
- Course: Permanent racing facility
- Course length: 0.526 miles (0.847 km)
- Distance: 500 laps, 263 mi (423.257 km)
- Scheduled distance: 500 laps, 263 mi (423.257 km)
- Average speed: 76.882 miles per hour (123.730 km/h)
- Attendance: 38,500

Pole position
Driver	Tim Richmond	Hendrick Motorsports
- Time: 20.728

Most laps led
Driver	Ricky Rudd	Bud Moore Engineering
- Laps: 163

Winner
No. 15	Ricky Rudd	Bud Moore Engineering

Television in the United States
- Network: SETN (tape-delayed until June 21)
- Announcers: Mike Joy, Benny Parsons

Radio in the United States
- Radio: Motor Racing Network

The 1986 Sovran Bank 500 was the eighth stock car race of the 1986 NASCAR Winston Cup Series and the 37th iteration of the event. The race was held on Sunday, April 27, 1986, before an audience of 38,500 in Martinsville, Virginia at Martinsville Speedway, a 0.526 miles (0.847 km) permanent oval-shaped short track. The race took the scheduled 500 laps to complete.

In a race of attrition, Bud Moore Engineering's Ricky Rudd took advantage of numerous mechanical failures given to other drivers during the race, lapping the field and leading the final 149 laps. The victory was Rudd's fifth career NASCAR Winston Cup Series victory and his first victory of the season. To fill out the top three, King Racing's Joe Ruttman and Hagan Enterprises' Terry Labonte finished second and third, respectively.

== Background ==
The layout of Martinsville Speedway, the venue where the race was held.

Martinsville Speedway is a NASCAR-owned stock car racing track located in Henry County, in Ridgeway, Virginia, just to the south of Martinsville. At 0.526 miles (0.847 km) in length, it is the shortest track in the NASCAR Cup Series. The track was also one of the first paved oval tracks in NASCAR, being built in 1947 by H. Clay Earles. It is also the only remaining race track that has been on the NASCAR circuit from its beginning in 1948.

=== Entry list ===
- (R) denotes rookie driver.

#	Driver	Team	Make	Sponsor
3	Dale Earnhardt	Richard Childress Racing	Chevrolet	Wrangler
5	Geoff Bodine	Hendrick Motorsports	Chevrolet	Levi Garrett
6	Trevor Boys	U.S. Racing	Chevrolet	U.S. Racing
7	Kyle Petty	Wood Brothers Racing	Ford	7-Eleven
8	Bobby Hillin Jr.	Stavola Brothers Racing	Chevrolet	Miller American
9	Bill Elliott	Melling Racing	Ford	Coors
11	Darrell Waltrip	Junior Johnson & Associates	Chevrolet	Budweiser
12	Neil Bonnett	Junior Johnson & Associates	Chevrolet	Budweiser
15	Ricky Rudd	Bud Moore Engineering	Ford	Motorcraft Quality Parts
17	Doug Heveron	Hamby Racing	Chevrolet	Hesco Exhaust Systems
18	Tommy Ellis	Freedlander Motorsports	Chevrolet	Freedlander Financial
19	Mike Skinner	Zanworth Racing Team	Pontiac	Zanworth Racing Team
22	Bobby Allison	Stavola Brothers Racing	Buick	Miller American
23	Michael Waltrip (R)	Bahari Racing	Pontiac	Hawaiian Punch
25	Tim Richmond	Hendrick Motorsports	Chevrolet	Folgers
26	Joe Ruttman	King Racing	Buick	Quaker State
27	Rusty Wallace	Blue Max Racing	Pontiac	Alugard
33	Harry Gant	Mach 1 Racing	Chevrolet	Skoal Bandit
35	Alan Kulwicki (R)	AK Racing	Ford	Quincy's Steakhouse
41	Ronnie Thomas	Ronnie Thomas Racing	Chevrolet	Ronnie Thomas Racing
43	Richard Petty	Petty Enterprises	Pontiac	STP
44	Terry Labonte	Hagan Enterprises	Oldsmobile	Piedmont Airlines
48	Jerry Cranmer	Hylton Motorsports	Chevrolet	Hylton Motorsports
52	Jimmy Means	Jimmy Means Racing	Pontiac	Jimmy Means Racing
64	Rick Baldwin	Langley Racing	Ford	Sunny King Ford
67	Buddy Arrington	Arrington Racing	Ford	Pannill Sweatshirts
70	J. D. McDuffie	McDuffie Racing	Pontiac	Rumple Furniture
71	Dave Marcis	Marcis Auto Racing	Pontiac	Helen Rae Special
75	Jody Ridley	RahMoc Enterprises	Ford	Nationwise Automotive
79	Derrike Cope	Razore Racing	Ford	Peterbilt
87	Bryan Baker	Buck Baker Racing	Oldsmobile	Bull Frog Knits
90	Ken Schrader	Donlavey Racing	Ford	Red Baron Frozen Pizza
94	Morgan Shepherd	Eller Racing	Pontiac	Kodak Film

== Qualifying ==
Qualifying was split into two rounds. The first round was held on Thursday, April 24, at 1:30 PM EST. Each driver had one lap to set a time. During the first round, the top 10 drivers in the round were guaranteed a starting spot in the race. If a driver was not able to guarantee a spot in the first round, they had the option to scrub their time from the first round and try and run a faster lap time in a second round qualifying run, held on Friday, April 25, at 1:30 PM EST. As with the first round, each driver had one lap to set a time. For this specific race, positions 11-30 were decided on time, and depending on who needed it, a select amount of positions were given to cars who had not otherwise qualified but were high enough in owner's points; up to two were given.

Tim Richmond, driving for Hendrick Motorsports, won the pole, setting a time of 20.893 and an average speed of 90.716 miles per hour (145.993 km/h) in the first round.

Two drivers failed to qualify.

=== Full qualifying results ===
Pos.	#	Driver	Team	Make	Time	Speed
1	25	Tim Richmond	Hendrick Motorsports	Chevrolet	20.893	90.716
2	11	Darrell Waltrip	Junior Johnson & Associates	Chevrolet	20.986	90.318
3	3	Dale Earnhardt	Richard Childress Racing	Chevrolet	20.987	90.313
4	15	Ricky Rudd	Bud Moore Engineering	Ford	21.048	90.051
5	27	Rusty Wallace	Blue Max Racing	Pontiac	21.065	89.979
6	5	Geoff Bodine	Hendrick Motorsports	Chevrolet	21.083	89.902
7	44	Terry Labonte	Hagan Enterprises	Oldsmobile	21.111	89.782
8	43	Richard Petty	Petty Enterprises	Pontiac	21.123	89.731
9	9	Bill Elliott	Melling Racing	Ford	21.154	89.600
10	26	Joe Ruttman	King Racing	Buick	21.238	89.245
Failed to lock in Round 1
11	22	Bobby Allison	Stavola Brothers Racing	Buick	21.222	89.312
12	7	Kyle Petty	Wood Brothers Racing	Ford	21.300	88.985
13	75	Jody Ridley	RahMoc Enterprises	Pontiac	21.312	88.935
14	18	Tommy Ellis	Freedlander Motorsports	Chevrolet	21.345	88.797
15	33	Harry Gant	Mach 1 Racing	Chevrolet	21.350	88.776
16	35	Alan Kulwicki (R)	AK Racing	Ford	21.351	88.772
17	79	Derrike Cope	Razore Racing	Ford	21.388	88.618
18	12	Neil Bonnett	Junior Johnson & Associates	Chevrolet	21.401	88.565
19	71	Dave Marcis	Marcis Auto Racing	Chevrolet	21.404	88.552
20	90	Ken Schrader	Donlavey Racing	Ford	21.408	88.536
21	94	Morgan Shepherd	Eller Racing	Pontiac	21.438	88.412
22	64	Jimmy Hensley	Langley Racing	Ford	21.446	88.379
23	8	Bobby Hillin Jr.	Stavola Brothers Racing	Buick	21.454	88.346
24	67	Buddy Arrington	Arrington Racing	Ford	21.504	88.140
25	23	Michael Waltrip (R)	Bahari Racing	Pontiac	21.527	88.046
26	17	Doug Heveron	Hamby Racing	Chevrolet	21.533	88.021
27	19	Mike Skinner	Zanworth Racing Team	Pontiac	21.580	87.829
28	6	Trevor Boys	U.S. Racing	Chevrolet	21.588	87.797
29	70	J. D. McDuffie	McDuffie Racing	Pontiac	21.680	87.424
30	48	Jerry Cranmer	Hylton Motorsports	Chevrolet	21.689	87.388
Provisional
31	52	Jimmy Means	Jimmy Means Racing	Pontiac	21.906	86.522
Failed to qualify
32	41	Ronnie Thomas	Ronnie Thomas Racing	Chevrolet	21.911	86.422
33	87	Bryan Baker	Buck Baker Racing	Oldsmobile	22.004	86.139
Official first round qualifying results
Official starting lineup

== Race results ==
Fin	St	#	Driver	Team	Make	Laps	Led	Status	Pts	Winnings
1	4	15	Ricky Rudd	Bud Moore Engineering	Ford	500	163	running	185	$40,850
2	10	26	Joe Ruttman	King Racing	Buick	499	0	running	170	$17,325
3	7	44	Terry Labonte	Hagan Enterprises	Oldsmobile	496	0	running	165	$17,125
4	16	35	Alan Kulwicki (R)	AK Racing	Ford	496	0	running	160	$8,350
5	12	7	Kyle Petty	Wood Brothers Racing	Ford	496	0	running	155	$11,050
6	23	8	Bobby Hillin Jr.	Stavola Brothers Racing	Buick	495	0	running	150	$7,680
7	20	90	Ken Schrader	Donlavey Racing	Ford	493	0	running	146	$7,830
8	11	22	Bobby Allison	Stavola Brothers Racing	Buick	492	0	running	142	$6,710
9	17	79	Derrike Cope	Razore Racing	Ford	489	0	running	138	$2,350
10	13	75	Jody Ridley	RahMoc Enterprises	Pontiac	487	0	running	134	$6,620
11	25	23	Michael Waltrip (R)	Bahari Racing	Pontiac	484	0	running	130	$2,070
12	31	52	Jimmy Means	Jimmy Means Racing	Pontiac	479	0	running	127	$5,000
13	30	48	Jerry Cranmer	Hylton Motorsports	Chevrolet	465	0	running	124	$4,790
14	28	6	Trevor Boys	U.S. Racing	Chevrolet	465	0	running	121	$4,580
15	24	67	Buddy Arrington	Arrington Racing	Ford	464	0	engine	118	$6,120
16	19	71	Dave Marcis	Marcis Auto Racing	Chevrolet	463	0	running	115	$4,245
17	6	5	Geoff Bodine	Hendrick Motorsports	Chevrolet	455	1	engine	117	$7,280
18	29	70	J. D. McDuffie	McDuffie Racing	Pontiac	429	0	running	109	$4,035
19	21	94	Morgan Shepherd	Eller Racing	Pontiac	381	0	running	106	$1,525
20	1	25	Tim Richmond	Hendrick Motorsports	Chevrolet	372	13	running	108	$7,440
21	3	3	Dale Earnhardt	Richard Childress Racing	Chevrolet	347	102	engine	105	$9,915
22	27	19	Mike Skinner	Zanworth Racing Team	Pontiac	344	0	running	97	$1,205
23	22	64	Jimmy Hensley	Langley Racing	Ford	326	0	oil pressure	94	$3,375
24	14	18	Tommy Ellis	Freedlander Motorsports	Chevrolet	301	36	engine	96	$1,185
25	15	33	Harry Gant	Mach 1 Racing	Chevrolet	292	83	engine	93	$9,075
26	18	12	Neil Bonnett	Junior Johnson & Associates	Chevrolet	267	5	engine	90	$8,265
27	2	11	Darrell Waltrip	Junior Johnson & Associates	Chevrolet	241	97	engine	87	$12,155
28	8	43	Richard Petty	Petty Enterprises	Pontiac	202	0	axle	79	$3,315
29	26	17	Doug Heveron	Hamby Racing	Chevrolet	78	0	fan belt	76	$3,295
30	5	27	Rusty Wallace	Blue Max Racing	Pontiac	56	0	engine	73	$7,125
31	9	9	Bill Elliott	Melling Racing	Ford	42	0	engine	70	$9,025
Failed to qualify
32		41	Ronnie Thomas	Ronnie Thomas Racing	Chevrolet					
33		87	Bryan Baker	Buck Baker Racing	Oldsmobile					
Official race results

== Standings after the race ==
Drivers' Championship standings

	Pos	Driver	Points
	1	Darrell Waltrip	1,247
	2	Dale Earnhardt	1,242 (-5)
2	3	Terry Labonte	1,113 (-134)
1	4	Rusty Wallace	1,092 (–155)
1	5	Kyle Petty	1,082 (–165)
2	6	Bill Elliott	1,040 (–207)
1	7	Bobby Allison	1,018 (–229)
1	8	Tim Richmond	1,008 (–239)
	9	Geoff Bodine	1,000 (–247)
2	10	Ricky Rudd	987 (–260)
Official driver's standings

- Note: Only the first 10 positions are included for the driver standings.

Previous race: 1986 First Union 400	NASCAR Winston Cup Series; 1986 season	Next race: 1986 Winston 500
