= RahMoc Enterprises =

NASCAR auto racing organization

Rahmoc Enterprises
- Owner(s): Bob Rahilly (1978–2018); Butch Mock (1978–1992)
- Base: North Carolina
- Series: Winston Cup, Busch Grand National
- Race drivers: Neil Bonnett, Morgan Shepherd, Dick Trickle
- Manufacturer: Chevrolet, Buick, Pontiac, Oldsmobile, Ford
- Opened: 1978

Career
- Drivers' Championships: 0
- Race victories: 4

Rahmoc Enterprises is a former NASCAR Winston Cup team that operated from 1978 to 1993. The team was owned by long-time engine builder Bob Rahilly and Butch Mock. Rahilly and Mock split in 1992, with the race team becoming Butch Mock Motorsports in 1993. Rahmoc Enterprises remains in operation today, known as Rahmoc Racing Engines Inc. with Dick and Bob Rahilly still building, servicing and supplying engines for many NASCAR teams. They also build race cars and manage and maintain cars for several smaller race teams. They can be reached at 704-400-2464

== Beginnings ==
Rahmoc's debut in NASCAR came in 1978, competing in two events, starting with the NAPA National 500. Mock drove the No. 75 Chevrolet to a 26th-place finish. He also ran the Dixie 500 at Atlanta, finishing 24th. Mock ran the 1979 Daytona 500 the next year, but finished 35th when he was involved in a wreck not of his making early in the race. After the Daytona wreck, Mock ceased driving and Rahmoc had several different drivers. Some were Lennie Pond at Atlanta and Daytona, Bobby Brack at Charlotte, and Bill Elswick for numerous races, his best finish being 16th at Richmond. Harry Gant drove in 1980 for the team at Riverside International Raceway, finishing seventh and Texas world Speedway, finishing eighth. Elswick returned over the next eleven races, and the team also picked up sponsorship from his Performer Boats Company. John Anderson, Chuck Bown, Joe Millikan, and Elswick finished out the year. Millikan came back in 1981, but was replaced after the Gabriel 400 by Tim Richmond. Richmond got his first top 10 finish in that event at Nashville Fairgrounds Speedway. Gary Balough drove for the rest of the 1981 season.

Balough returned in 1982, posting a top-ten at the Coca-Cola 500, but was released after his legal issues just five races into the season. Joe Ruttman took over for the rest of the season, Except for the Riverside Event, posting four top-fives, and numerous top tens. Jimmy Insolo filled in for the team at Riverside.

== 1983–1992 ==
In 1983, Rahmoc signed a one-year driver/sponsor agreement for Neil Bonnett to drive for their team, their first full-time sponsored Hodgdon Chevy. Bonnett picked up wins in the Busch Clash and the UNO 125 at Daytona, the World 600 at Charlotte and the Atlanta Journal 500. He finished fourth in points that year. For the 1984 season, and again without any sponsorship, long-time independent Dave Marcis was named driver, and had nine top-tens and a thirteenth place in points. Lake Speed took over in 1985, finishing second in The Daytona 500 in his first start with the team. This result brought full-time sponsor Nationwize Auto Parts to them and they finished 10th in the points. Speed had two tenth-place finishes in 1986, but was released after four races by the sponsor. Jody Ridley stepped in as an interim driver and had one top-ten before moving on after 10 races. Jim Sauter had four starts, before Morgan Shepherd took over for the balance of the season, posting two top-tens.

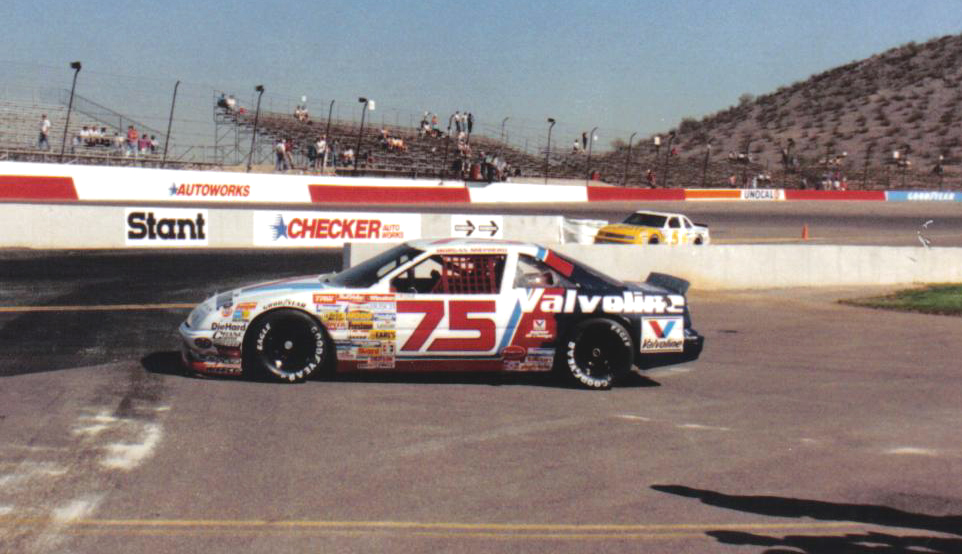
Rahmoc's 1989 racecar

In 1987, Bonnett returned with Valvoline as the sponsor of Rahmoc's Pontiacs. Bonnett had fifteen top-tens and was on his way to a top-ten points run, when he broke his hip in a crash at the Oakwood Homes 500. Morgan Shepard returned to the team to finish the season for the team, nearly winning the Rockingham Event.

Bonnett returned in 1988, finished 4th in the Daytona 500 and won at Richmond and Rockingham and at a special race held at Calder Park in Australia in the week between the Richmond and Rockingham races. But by mid season Bonnett began to have health issues related to the 87' Charlotte wreck, fell off the pace, and missed several races. Due to Neil's health, sponsor Valvoline called for a new driver going into the 1989 season. For the last race of the season, team returned to Calder Park again, for the Christman 500 at the end of 1988. With Bob Rahilly, two Pontiacs, a limited regular crew, and a volunteer crew being filled by local Australians. The "mates" assisted in preparing and qualifying both cars, including performing the pit crew duties, some for the first time, on race day. Scoring another pole position in qualifying and then dominating the race running one and two for most all of the race. Rick Wilson, in the second car #57, sustained some damage after being pushed into the wall on turn two in the final laps, causing him to drop to fourth. Morgan Sheppard continued on in a dominant performance coming home in first place in the #75. Rahmoc and the "mates" claiming back to back wins Down Under. Shepherd, who had filled in for Bonnett twice in 1988, was named as the full-time driver in 1989 with Valvoline again as the sponsor, the final of their 3-year agreement with Rahmoc. He garnered one pole and thirteen top-tens. Valvoline indicated they would return as a sponsor in 1990 if a younger driver could be had. So for 1990, Rick Wilson joined the team, which switched to Oldsmobile and with a late partial limited sponsorship from Food Lion/Dinner Bell Foods since Valvoline had ultimately decided instead to sit out the 1990 season. Wilson struggled heavily in his tenure, and mutually agreed to split with the team at season end. In 1991, Joe Ruttman, and with full sponsorship from Dinner Bell joined Rahmoc for the second time in his career. He finished third in the Daytona 500 and had four top-ten finishes and finished 20th in points.

Without a sponsor for 1992, Dick Trickle drove the car for Rahmoc in the Daytona 500, finishing fifth. After that event, team co-owner Bob Rahilly elected to retire from Winston Cup Racing, and return to his roots as an engine builder/supplier. Mock went on to form his own new team, Butch Mock Motorsports.

== Final years ==
After the 1992 Daytona 500, Bob Rahilly and Butch Mock split, with Bob and Dick Rahilly continuing to build engines and race cars to this day under the name RAHMOC Racing Engines at the original Rahmoc location at 7567 Flowes Store Rd Concord, NC. 28025. They can be reached at 704-400-2464.

.

== Team Results ==
Rahmoc results thru 02/92, BMM results to follow

=== Car No. 75 results ===
Year	Driver	No.	Make	1	2	3	4	5	6	7	8	9	10	11	12	13	14	15	16	17	18	19	20	21	22	23	24	25	26	27	28	29	30	31	32	33	34	Owners	Pts
1983	Neil Bonnett	75	Chevy	DAY; 22	RCH; 3	CAR; 12	ATL; 2	DAR; 7	NWS; 4	MAR; 16	TAL; 15	NSV; 13	DOV; 28	BRI; 4	CLT; 1	RSD; 13	POC; 7	MCH; 31	DAY; 28	NSV; 6	POC; 4	TAL; 35	MCH; 35	BRI; 10	DAR; 4	RCH; 8	DOV; 7	MAR; 6	NWS; 13	CLT; 26	CAR; 4	ATL; 1	RSD; 3					6th	3842
1984	Dave Marcis	75	Pontiac	DAY; 42	RCH; 11	CAR; 9	ATL; 18	BRI; 4	NWS; 13	DAR; 13	MAR; 19	TAL; 8	NSV; 10	DOV; 20	CLT; 36	RSD; 34	POC; 15	MCH; 21	DAY; 18	NSV; 23	POC; 26	TAL; 13	MCH; 19	BRI; 4	DAR; 21	RCH; 16	DOV; 4	MAR; 7	CLT; 24	NWS; 26	CAR; 9	ATL; 10	RSD; 20					13th	3416
1985	Lake Speed	75	Pontiac	DAY; 2	RCH; 10	CAR; 4	ATL; 40	BRI; 7	DAR; 9	NWS; 9	MAR; 8	TAL; 10	DOV; 24	CLT; 6	RSD; 25	POC; 12	MCH; 14	DAY; 34	POC; 11	TAL; 8	MCH; 16	BRI; 10	DAR; 16	RCH; 11	DOV; 10	MAR; 11	NWS; 12	CLT; 12	CAR; 29	ATL; 7	RSD; 9							10th	3507
1986	Lake Speed	75	Pontiac	DAY; 10	RCH; 17	CAR; 10	ATL; 22																															18th	2896
1986	Jody Ridley	75	Pontiac					BRI; 23	DAR; 20	NWS; 15	MAR; 10	TAL; 42	DOV; 18	CLT; 21		POC; 11	MCH; 34	DAY; 13																				18th	2896
1986	Morgan Shepherd	75	Pontiac												RSD; 27						GLN; 11		BRI; 22		RCH; 3	DOV; 10	MAR; 29	NWS; 25	CLT; 32	CAR; 24*	ATL; 27	RSD; 38						18th	2896
1986	Jim Sauter	75	Pontiac																POC; 14	TAL; 12		MCH; 37		DAR; 13														18th	2896
1987	Neil Bonnett	75	Pontiac	DAY; 12	CAR; 3	RCH; 22	ATL; 7	DAR; 6	NWS; 3	BRI; 11	MAR; 9	TAL; 7	CLT; 13	DOV; 9	POC; 8	RSD; 3	MCH; 17	DAY; 18	POC; 7	TAL; 32	GLN; 37	MCH; 9	BRI; 10	DAR; 32	RCH; 10	DOV; 3	MAR; 4	NWS; 11	CLT; 36									12th	3352
1987	Joe Ruttman	75	Pontiac																											CAR; 10	RSD; 7	ATL; 11						12th	3352
1988	Neil Bonnett	75	Pontiac	DAY; 4	RCH; 1	CAR; 1*	ATL; 22	DAR; 19	BRI; 11	NWS; 19	MAR; 30	TAL; 14	CLT; 36	DOV; 35	RSD; 10	POC; 11	MCH; 19	DAY; 18			GLN; 38	MCH; 40	BRI; 14	DAR; 16	RCH; 9	DOV; 8	MAR; 19	CLT; 18	NWS; 28	CAR; 10	PHO; 21	ATL; 13						14th	3238
1988	Morgan Shepherd	75	Pontiac																POC; 6	TAL; 40																		14th	3238
1989	Morgan Shepherd	75	Pontiac	DAY; 15	CAR; 27	ATL; 10	RCH; 33	DAR; 16	BRI; 26	NWS; 17	MAR; 18	TAL; 4	CLT; 32	DOV; 33	SON; 7	POC; 5	MCH; 35	DAY; 2	POC; 8	TAL; 6*	GLN; 6*	MCH; 2	BRI; 26	DAR; 9	RCH; 27	DOV; 16	MAR; 28	CLT; 10	NWS; 5	CAR; 36	PHO; 12	ATL; 8						13th	3403
1990	Rick Wilson	75	Olds	DAY; 30	RCH; 30	CAR; 18	ATL; 17	DAR; 29		NWS; 22	MAR; 27	TAL; 39	CLT; 19		SON; 10	POC; 35	MCH; 10	DAY; 39	POC; 31	TAL; 35	GLN; 32	MCH; 29	BRI; 32	DAR; 12	RCH; 20	DOV; 27	MAR; 20	NWS; 18			PHO; 19	ATL; 33						23rd	2666
1990	Rick Wilson	75	Pontiac						BRI; 5					DOV; 23															CLT; 11	CAR; 18								23rd	2666
1991	Joe Ruttman	75	Olds	DAY; 3	RCH; 29	CAR; 24	ATL; 27	DAR; 26	BRI; 13	NWS; 24	MAR; 16	TAL; 29	CLT; 21	DOV; 12	SON; 31	POC; 22	MCH; 19	DAY; 31	POC; 10	TAL; 10	GLN; 14		BRI; 17		RCH; 28	DOV; 13	MAR; 31		CLT; 16	CAR; 27	PHO; 22							20th	2938
1991	Joe Ruttman	75	Chevy																			MCH; 30		DAR; 9				NWS; 29				ATL; 20						20th	2938
1992	Dick Trickle	75	Olds	DAY; 5	CAR	RCH	ATL	DAR	BRI	NWS	MAR	TAL	CLT	DOV	SON	POC	MCH	DAY	POC	TAL	GLN	MCH	BRI	DAR	RCH	DOV	MAR	NWS	CLT	CAR	PHO	ATL						62nd	155
1993	Dick Trickle	75	Ford	DAY; 41	CAR; 29	RCH; 21	ATL; 37	DAR; 20	BRI; 22	NWS; 33	MAR; 14	TAL; 31	SON; 20	CLT; 19	DOV; 28	POC; 36	MCH; 31	DAY; 26	NHA; 33	POC; 30	TAL; 19																	29th	2322
1993	Todd Bodine	75	Ford																			GLN; 30	MCH; 40	BRI; DNQ	DAR; 27	RCH; 33	DOV; 35	MAR; 25	NWS; 23	CLT; 42	CAR; 25	PHO; 25						29th	2322
1993	Phil Parsons	75	Ford																														ATL; 9					29th	2322
1994	Todd Bodine	75	Ford	DAY; 36	CAR; 34	RCH; 25	ATL; 33	DAR; 22	BRI; 26	NWS; 19	MAR; 6	TAL; 28	SON; 38	CLT; 8	DOV; 16	POC; 14	MCH; 31	DAY; 7	NHA; 5	POC; 11	TAL; 16	IND; 9	GLN; 15	MCH; 38	BRI; 8	DAR; 26	RCH; 20	DOV; 16	MAR; 33	NWS; DNQ	CLT; 38	CAR; 21	PHO; 32	ATL; 3				21st	3048
1995	Todd Bodine	75	Ford	DAY; 37	CAR; 31	RCH; 37	ATL; 21	DAR; 4	BRI; 33	NWS; 21	MAR; DNQ	TAL; 8	SON; 8	CLT; 38	DOV; 30	POC; 24	MCH; 29	DAY; 23	NHA; 36	POC; 23	TAL; 29	IND; 21	GLN; 32	MCH; 19	BRI; DNQ	DAR; 42	RCH; 24	DOV; 37	MAR; 24	NWS; DNQ	CLT; 26	CAR; 17	PHO; 25	ATL; 40				33rd	2372
1996	Morgan Shepherd	75	Ford	DAY; 31	CAR; 37	RCH; 32	ATL; 30	DAR; 8	BRI; 30	NWS; 27	MAR; 20	TAL; 43	SON; 24	CLT; 29	DOV; 32	POC; 6	MCH; 11	DAY; 15	NHA; 22	POC; 17	TAL; 14	IND; 5	GLN; 9	MCH; 11	BRI; 19	DAR; 24	RCH; 23	DOV; 18	MAR; 6	NWS; 14	CLT; 23	CAR; 29	PHO; 17	ATL; 28				19th	3133
1997	Rick Mast	75	Ford	DAY; DNQ	CAR; 21	RCH; 18	ATL; 17	DAR; 19	TEX; 31	BRI; 17	MAR; 36	SON; DNQ	TAL; 22	CLT; 20	DOV; 12	POC; 20	MCH; 30	CAL; 41	DAY; 18	NHA; 28	POC; 25	IND; 23	GLN; 23	MCH; 38	BRI; 33	DAR; 34	RCH; 26	NHA; 20	DOV; 10	MAR; 23	CLT; DNQ	TAL; 9	CAR; 42	PHO; 31	ATL; 35			32nd	2569
1998	Rick Mast	75	Ford	DAY; 30	CAR; 12	LVS; 11	ATL; 33	DAR; 43	BRI; 25	TEX; 41	MAR; 33	TAL; 18	CAL; 25	CLT; 26	DOV; 11	RCH; 43	MCH; 31	POC; 38	SON; 8	NHA; 32	POC; 37	IND; 22	GLN; 30	MCH; 26	BRI; 35	NHA; 22	DAR; 36	RCH; 31	DOV; 24	MAR; 41	CLT; 34	TAL; DNQ	DAY; DNQ	PHO; 29	CAR; 42	ATL; DNQ		33rd	2366
1999	Ted Musgrave	75	Ford	DAY; 15	CAR; 40	LVS; DNQ	ATL; 24	DAR; 29	TEX; 31	BRI; 7	MAR; 40	TAL; 28	CAL; 29	RCH; 11	CLT; 23	DOV; 24	MCH; 25	POC; 11	SON; 20	DAY; 35	NHA; 25	POC; 33	IND; 35	GLN; 27	MCH; 41	BRI; 16	DAR; 38	RCH; 8	NHA; 23	DOV; 28	MAR; 19	CLT; 31	TAL; 29	CAR; 32	PHO; 29	HOM; 42		33rd	2689
1999	Hut Stricklin	75	Ford																																		ATL; DNQ	33rd	2689
2000	Wally Dallenbach Jr.	75	Ford	DAY; 40	CAR; 20	LVS; 35	ATL; 39	DAR; DNQ	BRI; 29	TEX; DNQ	MAR; DNQ	TAL; 16	CAL; 27	RCH; 16	CLT; 28	DOV; 24	MCH; 34	POC; 39	SON; 40	DAY; 21	NHA; 27	POC; 31	IND; 35	GLN; 9	MCH; 25	BRI; 33	DAR; 19	RCH; 23	NHA; 39	DOV; 21	MAR; 40	CLT; 33	TAL; DNQ	CAR; 22	PHO; 22	HOM; 35	ATL; 29	34th	2453

== Driver history ==
RahMoc Enterprises

- Butch Mock (1978–79)
- Bill Elswick (1979–81)
- Bobby Brack (1979)
- Harry Gant (1980)
- Lennie Pond (1980)
- John Anderson (1980)
- Chuck Bown (1980)
- Kyle Petty (1980)
- Jim Sauter (1980, 1986)
- Joe Millikan (1980–81)
- Dick May (1981)
- Tim Richmond (1981)
- Gary Balough (1981–82)
- Joe Ruttman (1982, 1987, 1991)
- Jimmy Insolo (1982)
- Neil Bonnett (1983, 1987–88)
- Dave Marcis (1984)
- Lake Speed (1985–86)
- Jody Ridley (1986)
- Morgan Shepherd (1986, 1988–89, 1996)
- Rick Wilson (1990)
- Dick Trickle (1992 Daytona 500, suspended operations; returned in 1993 with Butch Mock Motorsports)
- Todd Bodine (1993-1995)
- Rick Mast (1997-1998)
- Ted Musgrave (1999)
- Wally Dallenbach (2000, for Galaxy Motorsports)
