= Stavola Brothers Racing =

American auto racing organization

- Owner(s): Mickey Stavola; William Stavola
- Base: Harrisburg, North Carolina
- Series: Winston Cup
- Race drivers: Bobby Allison, Bobby Hillin Jr., Mike Alexander, Dick Trickle, Rick Wilson, Sterling Marlin, Jeff Burton, Hut Stricklin, Buckshot Jones, Morgan Shepherd
- Manufacturer: Buick, Chevrolet, Ford
- Opened: 1983
- Closed: 1999

Career
- Debut: 1984 Daytona 500 (Daytona)
- Latest race: 1998 NAPA 500 (Atlanta)
- Drivers' Championships: 0
- Race victories: 4

Stavola Brothers Racing was a NASCAR racing team, owned by Bill and Mickey Stavola, and operating a NASCAR Winston Cup team from 1984 through 1998. The team won the 1988 Daytona 500 with Bobby Allison behind the wheel of the No. 12 Miller High Life Buick. Other victories include the 1987 Pepsi 400 with Allison, and the 1986 Talladega 500 with Bobby Hillin Jr.

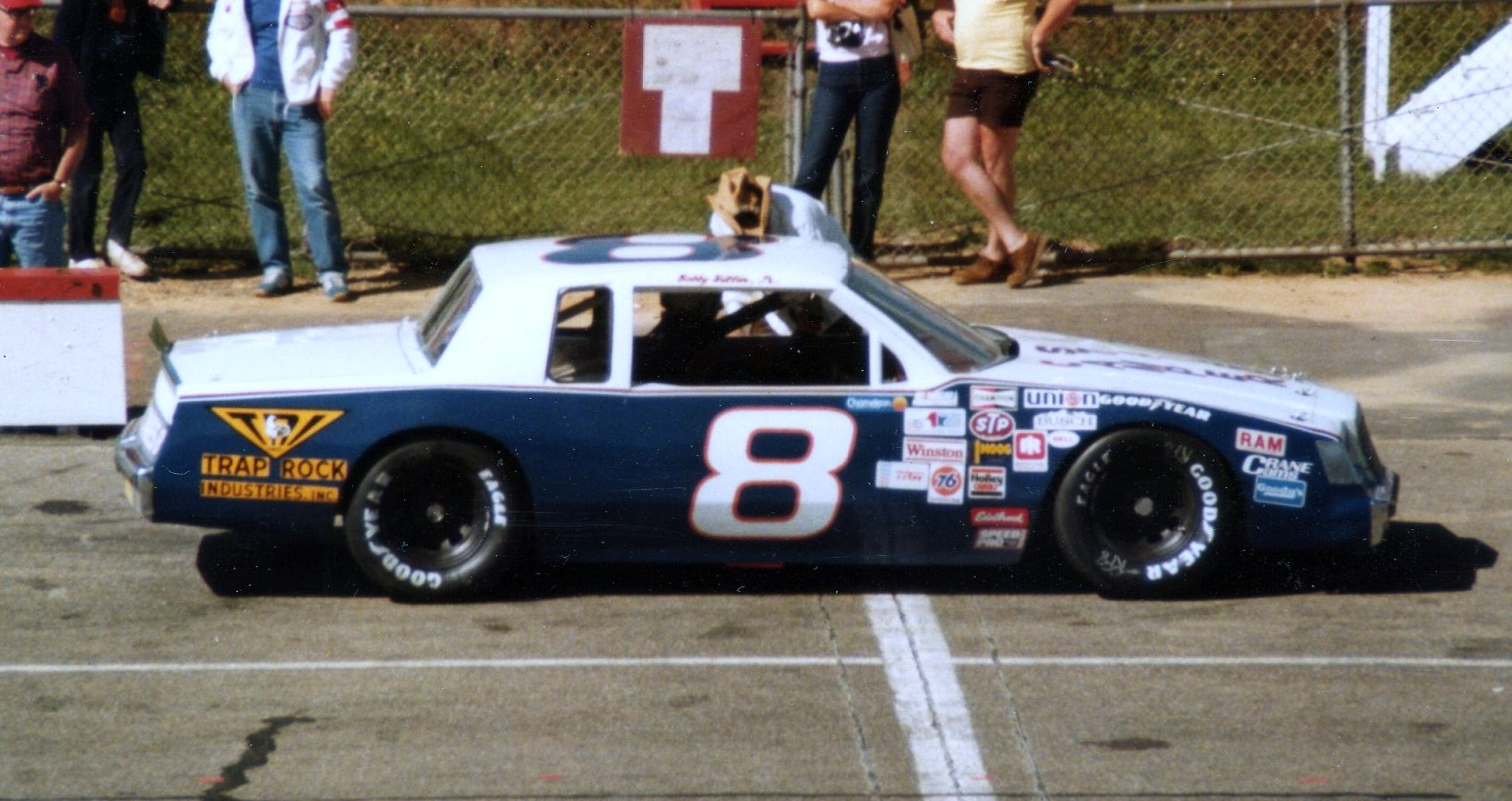
Bobby Hillin Jr. in 1984

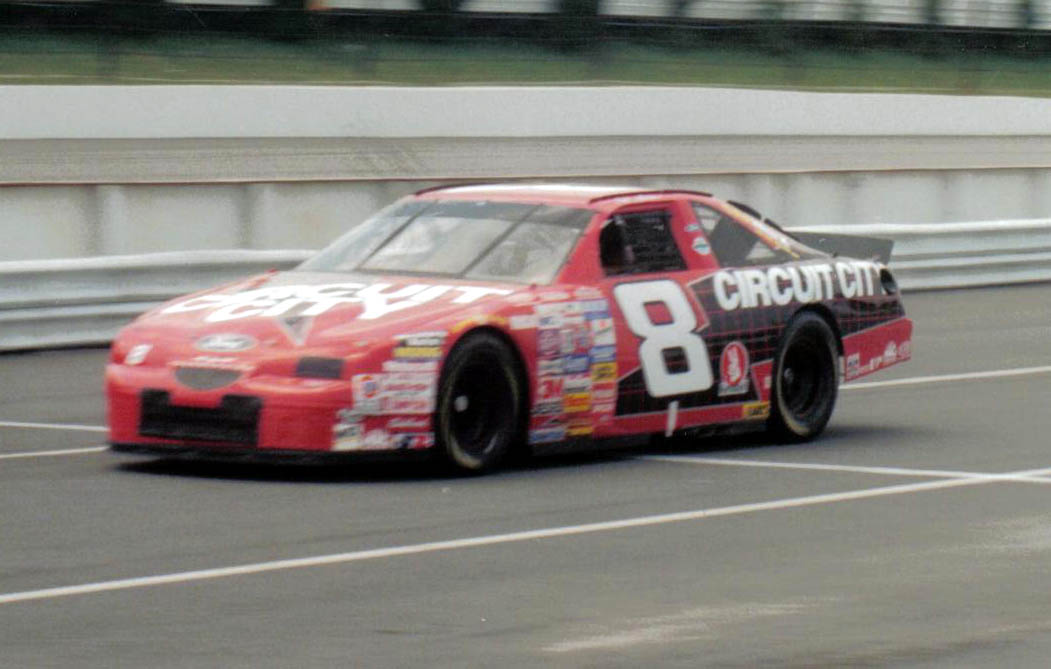
1997 Circuit City Ford Thunderbird

In 1989 Dick Trickle was named NASCAR Rookie of the Year while driving for the team. Bobby Hillin drove the Snickers in 1990. Rick Wilson drove for the team in 1991 with sponsorship from Snickers, and the team switched to a Ford Thunderbird after Buick pulled out of NASCAR. Wilson was released after the 1992 Daytona 500 and Dick Trickle returned to drive for the remainder of the season. Sterling Marlin drove for the team in 1993 with new sponsorship from Raybestos, finishing second at the Pepsi 400 in July. Jeff Burton replaced Marlin the following year, and won Rookie Of The Year honors with one top-five finish; he drove the car again in 1995 before departing for Roush Racing.

In 1996 Hut Stricklin was hired to drive for Circuit City replacing Raybestos, which had become an associate sponsor for Robert Yates Racing. Stricklin finished second at the Mountain Dew Southern 500 in September. In 1998 the team switched to a Chevrolet Monte Carlo. Stricklin was released in May, after failing to qualify for 5 of the season's first 11 races, and Circuit City left to become an associate sponsor for Joe Gibbs Racing and driver Bobby Labonte. During a five-race partnership with Buckshot Racing, Buckshot Jones finished eighth during the MBNA Platinum 400. Morgan Shepherd drove the team's final race on November 8, 1998 at Atlanta Motor Speedway during the NAPA 500 in a Nokia/Kendall Motor Oil-sponsored car.

== Results ==
=== Primary Car Results ===
Year	Driver	No.	Make	1	2	3	4	5	6	7	8	9	10	11	12	13	14	15	16	17	18	19	20	21	22	23	24	25	26	27	28	29	30	31	32	33	Owners	Pts
1984	Bobby Hillin Jr.	8	Chevy	DAY; 35	RCH	CAR	ATL; 37	BRI	NWS			TAL; 11	NSV		CLT; 33	RSD			DAY; 37	NSV	POC; 33	TAL; 15	MCH; 21	BRI	DAR; 23	RCH	DOV; DNQ	MAR	CLT; 15	NWS		ATL; 33	RSD				32nd	1477
1984	Bobby Hillin Jr.	8	Buick							DAR; 12	MAR			DOV; 25			POC; 16	MCH; 19													CAR; 12						32nd	1477
1985	Bobby Hillin Jr.	8	Chevy	DAY; 9	RCH; 11	CAR; 24	ATL; 12	BRI; 9	DAR; 20	NWS; 19	MAR; 18	TAL; 9	DOV; 12	CLT; 12	RSD; 17	POC; 18	MCH; 28	DAY; 15	POC; 29	TAL; 38	MCH; 26	BRI; 24	DAR; 13	RCH; 21	DOV; 23	MAR; 8	NWS; 17	CLT; 9	CAR; 25	ATL; 19	RSD; 13						15th	3091
1986	Bobby Hillin Jr.	8	Chevy	DAY; 4																																	9th	3546
1986	Bobby Hillin Jr.	8	Buick		RCH; 6	CAR; 39	ATL; 16	BRI; 28	DAR; 38	NWS; 13	MAR; 6	TAL; 4	DOV; 8	CLT; 15	RSD; 32	POC; 10	MCH; 7	DAY; 3	POC; 33	TAL; 1	GLN; 28	MCH; 13	BRI; 9	DAR; 7	RCH; 10	DOV; 9	MAR; 17	NWS; 15	CLT; 26	CAR; 11	ATL; 15	RSD; 6					9th	3546
1987	Bobby Hillin Jr.	8	Buick	DAY; 13	CAR; 14	RCH; 11	ATL; 24	DAR; 23	NWS; 13	BRI; 26	MAR; 15	TAL; 5	CLT; 34	DOV; 26	POC; 14	RSD; 13	MCH; 6	DAY; 13	POC; 15	TAL; 40	GLN; 29	MCH; 13	BRI; 29	DAR; 6	RCH; 15	DOV; 39	MAR; 22	NWS; 8	CLT; 28	CAR; 33	RSD; 34	ATL; 14					19th	3027
1988	Bobby Hillin Jr.	8	Buick	DAY; 13	RCH; 8	CAR; 21	ATL; 6	DAR; 17	BRI; 15	NWS; 18	MAR; 3	TAL; 13	CLT; 14	DOV; 17	RSD; 24	POC; 15	MCH; 12	DAY; 13	POC; 21	TAL; 17	GLN; 13	MCH; 37	BRI; 10	DAR; 30	RCH; 14	DOV; 21	MAR; 14	CLT; 6	NWS; 13	CAR; 23	PHO; 7	ATL; 9					12th	3446
1989	Bobby Hillin Jr.	8	Buick	DAY; 39	CAR; 15	ATL; 30	RCH; 15	DAR; 26	BRI; 27	NWS; DNQ	MAR; 21	TAL; 35	CLT; 9	DOV; 13	SON; 13	POC; 13	MCH; 20	DAY; 28	POC; 11	TAL; 29	GLN; 5	MCH; 14	BRI; 7	DAR; 8	RCH; 13	DOV; 15	MAR; 27	CLT; 9	NWS; 15	CAR; 8	PHO; 18	ATL; 7					17th	3139
1990	Bobby Hillin Jr.	8	Buick	DAY; 6	RCH; 31	CAR; 17	ATL; 16	DAR; 12	BRI; 21	NWS; 30	MAR; 21	TAL; 23	CLT; 34	DOV; 16	SON; 5	POC; 29	MCH; 28	DAY; 6	POC; 12	TAL; 10	GLN; 16	MCH; 21	BRI; 15	DAR; 31	RCH; 11	DOV; 14	MAR; 26	NWS; 14	CLT; 31	CAR; 14	PHO; 42	ATL; 22					20th	3048
1991	Rick Wilson	8	Buick	DAY; 33	RCH; 18	CAR; 19	ATL; 12	DAR; 14	BRI; 33	NWS; 27	MAR; 22	TAL; 25	CLT; 18	DOV; 25	SON; 16	POC; 13	MCH; 31	DAY; 24	POC; 24	TAL; 38	GLN; 19	MCH; 39	BRI; 20	DAR; 13	RCH; 13	DOV; 29	MAR; 26	NWS; 32	CLT; 17	CAR; 20	PHO; 15	ATL; 33					28th	2723
1992	Rick Wilson	8	Ford	DAY; 23																																	20th	3036
1992	Dick Trickle	8	Ford		CAR; 36	RCH; 22	ATL; 5	DAR; 7	BRI; 5	NWS; 11	MAR; 17	TAL; 19	CLT; 10	DOV; 9	SON; 26	POC; 29	MCH; 20	DAY; 35	POC; 9	TAL; 28	GLN; 24	MCH; 19	BRI; 23	DAR; 27	RCH; 20	DOV; 27	MAR; 6	NWS; 18	CLT; 9	CAR; 16	PHO; 40	ATL; 37					20th	3036
1993	Sterling Marlin	8	Ford	DAY; 9	CAR; 28	RCH; 31	ATL; 12	DAR; 21	BRI; 20	NWS; 9*	MAR; 21	TAL; 24	SON; 12	CLT; 24	DOV; 33	POC; 8	MCH; 8	DAY; 2	NHA; 6*	POC; 7	TAL; 27	GLN; 6	MCH; 17	BRI; 23	DAR; 31	RCH; 24	DOV; 11	MAR; 30	NWS; 19	CLT; 17	CAR; 12	PHO; 30	ATL; 17				15th	3355
1994	Jeff Burton	8	Ford	DAY; 26	CAR; 20	RCH; 20	ATL; 4	DAR; 20	BRI; 31	NWS; 33	MAR; 36	TAL; 39	SON; 15	CLT; 29	DOV; 33	POC; 22	MCH; 21	DAY; 18	NHA; 38	POC; 4	TAL; 26	IND; 19	GLN; 25	MCH; 33	BRI; 20	DAR; 8	RCH; DNQ	DOV; 37	MAR; 36	NWS; 28	CLT; 25	CAR; 11	PHO; 27	ATL; 31			24th	2726
1995	Jeff Burton	8	Ford	DAY; 24	CAR; 19	RCH; 31	ATL; 33	DAR; 19	BRI; 28	NWS; 26	MAR; DNQ	TAL; 25	SON; 18	CLT; 40	DOV; 25	POC; 36	MCH; 31	DAY; 18	NHA; 25	POC; 27	TAL; 22	IND; 38	GLN; 38	MCH; 23	BRI; 9	DAR; 16	RCH; 13	DOV; 20	MAR; 31	NWS; DNQ	CLT; 31	CAR; 5	PHO; 23	ATL; 36			32nd	2556
1996	Hut Stricklin	8	Ford	DAY; 22	CAR; 30	RCH; 39	ATL; 25	DAR; 20	BRI; 11	NWS; 16	MAR; 31	TAL; 22	SON; 13	CLT; 28	DOV; 34	POC; 29	MCH; 27	DAY; 19	NHA; 23	POC; 32	TAL; 34	IND; 18	GLN; 37	MCH; 26	BRI; 20	DAR; 2*	RCH; 24	DOV; 38	MAR; 25	NWS; 16	CLT; 25	CAR; 11	PHO; 30	ATL; 17			22nd	2854
1997	Hut Stricklin	8	Ford	DAY; 19	CAR; 36	RCH; 32	ATL; 41	DAR; 26	TEX; 33	BRI; 26	MAR; 14	SON; 29	TAL; 36	CLT; 25	DOV; 19	POC; 24	MCH; 22	CAL; 42	DAY; 36	NHA; 15	POC; 23	IND; DNQ	GLN; 36	MCH; 36	BRI; 23	DAR; 17	RCH; 27	NHA; 10	DOV; 17	MAR; 16	CLT; 35	TAL; DNQ	CAR; 25	PHO; 30	ATL; DNQ		34th	2423
1998	Hut Stricklin	8	Chevy	DAY; DNQ	CAR; 29	LVS; 43	ATL; 37	DAR; DNQ	BRI; 41	TEX; 40	MAR; 31	TAL; DNQ	CAL; DNQ	CLT; DNQ																							50th	700
1998	Buckshot Jones	8	Chevy												DOV; 8	RCH; DNQ																					50th	700
1998	Morgan Shepherd	8	Chevy														MCH; 43	POC	SON	NHA	POC															ATL; 39	50th	700
1998	Buckshot Jones	00	Chevy																			IND; 27	GLN	MCH; 27	BRI	NHA; DNQ	DAR	RCH; DNQ	DOV; 42	MAR	CLT	TAL; 16	DAY	PHO	CAR		50th	700

=== Secondary Car Results ===
Year	Driver	No.	Make	1	2	3	4	5	6	7	8	9	10	11	12	13	14	15	16	17	18	19	20	21	22	23	24	25	26	27	28	29	Owners	Pts
1986	Bobby Allison	22	Buick	DAY; 42	RCH; 4	CAR; 34	ATL; 9	BRI; 6	DAR; 3	NWS; 6	MAR; 8	TAL; 1	DOV; 2	CLT; 12	RSD; 7	POC; 13	MCH; 11	DAY; 15	POC; 5	TAL; 10	GLN; 12	MCH; 24	BRI; 8	DAR; 2	RCH; 8	DOV; 20	MAR; 21	NWS; 22	CLT; 41	CAR; 25	ATL; 16	RSD; 7	7th	3698
1987	Bobby Allison	22	Buick	DAY; 6	CAR; 13	RCH; 9	ATL; 19	DAR; 28	NWS; 14	BRI; 23	MAR; 8	TAL; 39	CLT; 22	DOV; 25	POC; 6	RSD; 8	MCH; 27	DAY; 1	POC; 27	TAL; 12	GLN; 9	MCH; 7	BRI; 22	DAR; 26	RCH; 12	DOV; 7	MAR; 8	NWS; 17	CLT; 2*	CAR; 38	RSD; 5	ATL; 4	9th	3530
1988	Bobby Allison	12	Buick	DAY; 1*	RCH; 11	CAR; 22	ATL; 11	DAR; 9	BRI; 5	NWS; 20	MAR; 8	TAL; 2	CLT; 17	DOV; 10	RSD; 22	POC; 39																	11th	3585
1988	Mike Alexander	12	Buick														MCH; 10	DAY; 15	POC; 15	TAL; 25	GLN; 5	MCH; 23	BRI; 18	DAR; 14	RCH; 17	DOV; 7	MAR; 29	CLT; 21	NWS; 9	CAR; 6	PHO; 27	ATL; 3	11th	3585
1989	Mike Alexander	84	Buick	DAY; 27																													15th	3285
1989	Dick Trickle	84	Buick		CAR; 13	ATL; 3	RCH; 25	DAR; 13	BRI; 5	NWS; 4	MAR; 3	TAL; 27	CLT; 29	DOV; 21	SON; 30	POC; 24	MCH; 25	DAY; 8	POC; 20	TAL; 16	GLN; 34	MCH; 19	BRI; 28	DAR; 17	RCH; 8	DOV; 25	MAR; 3	CLT; 30	NWS; 12	CAR; 5	PHO; 7	ATL; 35	15th	3285

== Stavola Labonte Racing ==
Bill Stavola and Terry Labonte announced plans in 2009 to field cars in Sprint Cup in 2010 with Labonte driving initially. It was reported that they would attempt 3 races: Richmond, Charlotte and Texas, in the No. 10 Chevy. Cars and engines were supplied by Richard Childress Racing with sponsorship from Gander Mountain. The team attempted but failed to qualify at Richmond with Terry Labonte as driver after Terry's little brother Bobby Labonte needed the champions provisional. Terry and Gander Mountain would move to Prism Motorsports' 55 car for the race. On October 11, 2010 the team announced that Bobby Labonte would drive for the team at Charlotte and Texas, where the team finished 22nd and 30th respectively. Though Terry hoped to secure enough sponsorship to run 15 races the following season, the money never materialized and the team became dormant by the conclusion of 2010.

=== Car No. 10 results ===
Year	Driver	No.	Make	1	2	3	4	5	6	7	8	9	10	11	12	13	14	15	16	17	18	19	20	21	22	23	24	25	26	27	28	29	30	31	32	33	34	35	36	Owners	Pts
2010	Terry Labonte	10	Chevy	DAY	CAL	LVS	ATL	BRI	MAR	PHO	TEX	TAL	RCH	DAR	DOV	CLT	POC	MCH	SON	NHA	DAY	CHI	IND	POC	GLN	MCH	BRI	ATL	RCH; DNQ	NHA	DOV	KAN	CAL							49th	201
2010	Bobby Labonte	10	Chevy																															CLT; 22	MAR	TAL	TEX; 30	PHO	HOM	49th	201
