= 1986 Winston 500 =

Ninth race of the 1986 NASCAR Winston Cup Series

Race details
- Race 9 of 29 in the 1986 NASCAR Winston Cup Series
- The 1986 Winston 500 program cover, featuring Bill Elliott.
- Date: May 4, 1986
- Official name: 17th Annual Winston 500
- Location: Lincoln, Alabama, Alabama International Motor Speedway
- Course: Permanent racing facility
- Course length: 2.66 miles (4.28 km)
- Distance: 188 laps, 500.08 mi (804.8 km)
- Average speed: 157.698 miles per hour (253.790 km/h)
- Attendance: 130,000

Pole position
Driver	Bill Elliott	Melling Racing
- Time: 45.121

Most laps led
Driver	Bill Elliott	Melling Racing
- Laps: 116

Winner
No. 22	Bobby Allison	Stavola Brothers Racing

Television in the United States
- Network: ESPN
- Announcers: Bob Jenkins, Larry Nuber

Radio in the United States
- Radio: Motor Racing Network

The 1986 Winston 500 was the ninth stock car race of the 1986 NASCAR Winston Cup Series and the 17th iteration of the event. The race was held on Sunday, May 4, 1986, before an audience of 130,000 in Lincoln, Alabama at Alabama International Motor Speedway, a 2.66 miles (4.28 km) permanent triangle-shaped superspeedway. The race took the scheduled 188 laps to complete.

In the final laps of the race, Stavola Brothers Racing's Bobby Allison made a late-race charge to the lead, passing with six laps left in the race. Allison then defended a last-lap move by Richard Childress Racing's Dale Earnhardt in the final turns of the race, securing his 82nd career NASCAR Winston Cup Series victory and his only victory of the season. To fill out the top three, the aforementioned Earnhardt and owner-driver Buddy Baker finished second and third, respectively.

The race is notable for an incident in which a fan stole the pace car for the event, resulting in a short lived police chase occurring on the track. The fan was later arrested for the incident.

== Background ==
The layout of Alabama International Motor Speedway, the venue where the race was held.

Talladega Superspeedway, originally known as Alabama International Motor Superspeedway (AIMS), is a motorsports complex located north of Talladega, Alabama. It is located on the former Anniston Air Force Base in the small city of Lincoln. The track is a tri-oval and was constructed in the 1960s by the International Speedway Corporation, a business controlled by the France family. Talladega is most known for its steep banking and the unique location of the start/finish line that's located just past the exit to pit road. The track currently hosts the NASCAR series such as the NASCAR Cup Series, Xfinity Series and the Camping World Truck Series. Talladega is the longest NASCAR oval, a 2.66-mile-long (4.28 km) tri-oval like the Daytona International Speedway, which also is a 2.5-mile-long (4.0 km) tri-oval.

=== Entry list ===
- (R) denotes rookie driver.

#	Driver	Team	Make	Sponsor
0	Delma Cowart	H. L. Waters Racing	Chevrolet	Heyward Grooms Construction, Carey Hillard's Restaurants
1	Sterling Marlin	Ellington Racing	Chevrolet	Bull's-Eye Barbecue Sauce
02	Mark Martin	Gunderman Racing	Ford	Lone Star Peterbilt
3	Dale Earnhardt	Richard Childress Racing	Chevrolet	Wrangler
4	Rick Wilson	Morgan–McClure Motorsports	Oldsmobile	Cap'n Coty's
5	Geoff Bodine	Hendrick Motorsports	Chevrolet	Levi Garrett
6	Trevor Boys	U.S. Racing	Chevrolet	Finky's
7	Kyle Petty	Wood Brothers Racing	Ford	7-Eleven
8	Bobby Hillin Jr.	Stavola Brothers Racing	Chevrolet	Miller American
9	Bill Elliott	Melling Racing	Ford	Coors
10	Greg Sacks	DiGard Motorsports	Pontiac	TRW Automotive
11	Darrell Waltrip	Junior Johnson & Associates	Chevrolet	Budweiser
12	Neil Bonnett	Junior Johnson & Associates	Chevrolet	Budweiser
15	Ricky Rudd	Bud Moore Engineering	Ford	Motorcraft Quality Parts
17	Pancho Carter	Hamby Racing	Chevrolet	Kmart
18	Tommy Ellis	Freedlander Motorsports	Chevrolet	Freedlander Financial
22	Bobby Allison	Stavola Brothers Racing	Buick	Miller American
23	Michael Waltrip (R)	Bahari Racing	Pontiac	Hawaiian Punch
25	Tim Richmond	Hendrick Motorsports	Chevrolet	Folgers
26	Joe Ruttman	King Racing	Buick	Quaker State
27	Rusty Wallace	Blue Max Racing	Pontiac	Alugard
28	Cale Yarborough	Ranier-Lundy Racing	Ford	Hardee's
32	Jim Sauter	Ingle Racing	Chevrolet	Ingle Racing
33	Harry Gant	Mach 1 Racing	Chevrolet	Skoal Bandit
35	Alan Kulwicki (R)	AK Racing	Ford	Quincy's Steakhouse
43	Richard Petty	Petty Enterprises	Pontiac	STP
44	Terry Labonte	Hagan Enterprises	Oldsmobile	Piedmont Airlines
47	Morgan Shepherd	Race Hill Farm Team	Chevrolet	Race Hill Farm Team
48	Ronnie Thomas	Hylton Motorsports	Chevrolet	Hylton Motorsports
52	Jimmy Means	Jimmy Means Racing	Pontiac	Jimmy Means Racing
54	Eddie Bierschwale	Gray Racing	Chevrolet	Gray Racing
55	Benny Parsons	Jackson Bros. Motorsports	Oldsmobile	Copenhagen
60	Dick Skillen	Goff Racing	Chevrolet	Goff Racing
64	Tommy Gale	Langley Racing	Ford	Sunny King Ford
66	Phil Parsons	Jackson Bros. Motorsports	Oldsmobile	Skoal
67	Buddy Arrington	Arrington Racing	Ford	Pannill Sweatshirts
70	J. D. McDuffie	McDuffie Racing	Pontiac	Rumple Furniture
71	Dave Marcis	Marcis Auto Racing	Pontiac	Helen Rae Special
73	Phil Barkdoll	Barkdoll Racing	Ford	Helen Rae Special
75	Jody Ridley	RahMoc Enterprises	Pontiac	Nationwise Automotive
77	Ken Ragan	Ragan Racing	Chevrolet	McCord Gasket
78	Steve Moore	Steve Moore Racing	Chevrolet	Steve Moore Racing
81	Chet Fillip (R)	Fillip Racing	Ford	Circle Bar Truck Corral
88	Buddy Baker	Baker–Schiff Racing	Oldsmobile	Crisco
90	Ken Schrader	Donlavey Racing	Ford	Red Baron Frozen Pizza
94	Doug Heveron	Eller Racing	Pontiac	Kodak Film
95	Davey Allison	Sadler Brothers Racing	Buick	Sadler Brothers Racing
98	Ron Bouchard	Curb Racing	Pontiac	Valvoline
99	Connie Saylor	Ball Motorsports	Chevrolet	Ball Motorsports

== Qualifying ==
Qualifying was split into two rounds. The first round was held on Thursday, May 1, at 1:00 PM EST. Each driver had one lap to set a time. During the first round, the top 20 drivers in the round were guaranteed a starting spot in the race. If a driver was not able to guarantee a spot in the first round, they had the option to scrub their time from the first round and try and run a faster lap time in a second round qualifying run, held on Friday, May 2, at 1:00 PM EST. As with the first round, each driver had one lap to set a time. For this specific race, positions 21-40 were decided on time, and depending on who needed it, a select amount of positions were given to cars who had not otherwise qualified but were high enough in owner's points; up to two were given.

Bill Elliott, driving for Melling Racing, won the pole, setting a time of 45.121 and an average speed of 212.229 miles per hour (341.549 km/h) in the first round.

Seven drivers failed to qualify.

=== Full qualifying results ===
Pos.	#	Driver	Team	Make	Time	Speed
1	9	Bill Elliott	Melling Racing	Ford	45.121	212.229
2	22	Bobby Allison	Stavola Brothers Racing	Buick	45.758	209.274
3	5	Geoff Bodine	Hendrick Motorsports	Chevrolet	46.001	208.169
4	28	Cale Yarborough	Ranier-Lundy Racing	Ford	46.018	208.092
5	1	Sterling Marlin	Ellington Racing	Chevrolet	46.088	207.776
6	47	Morgan Shepherd	Race Hill Farm Team	Buick	46.174	207.389
7	88	Buddy Baker	Baker–Schiff Racing	Oldsmobile	46.227	207.151
8	55	Benny Parsons	Jackson Bros. Motorsports	Oldsmobile	46.240	207.093
9	7	Kyle Petty	Wood Brothers Racing	Ford	46.306	206.798
10	8	Bobby Hillin Jr.	Stavola Brothers Racing	Buick	46.308	206.789
11	66	Phil Parsons	Jackson Bros. Motorsports	Oldsmobile	46.315	206.758
12	25	Tim Richmond	Hendrick Motorsports	Chevrolet	46.361	206.552
13	44	Terry Labonte	Hagan Enterprises	Oldsmobile	46.495	205.957
14	3	Dale Earnhardt	Richard Childress Racing	Chevrolet	46.510	205.891
15	75	Jody Ridley	RahMoc Enterprises	Pontiac	46.516	205.864
16	27	Rusty Wallace	Blue Max Racing	Pontiac	46.524	205.829
17	26	Joe Ruttman	King Racing	Buick	46.550	205.714
18	43	Richard Petty	Petty Enterprises	Pontiac	46.730	204.921
19	10	Greg Sacks	DiGard Motorsports	Pontiac	46.751	204.829
20	15	Ricky Rudd	Bud Moore Engineering	Ford	46.790	204.659
Failed to lock in Round 1
21	4	Rick Wilson	Morgan–McClure Motorsports	Chevrolet	46.640	205.317
22	33	Harry Gant	Mach 1 Racing	Chevrolet	46.683	205.128
23	18	Tommy Ellis	Freedlander Motorsports	Chevrolet	46.799	204.619
24	11	Darrell Waltrip	Junior Johnson & Associates	Chevrolet	46.864	204.335
25	17	Pancho Carter	Hamby Racing	Chevrolet	46.903	204.166
26	98	Ron Bouchard	Curb Racing	Pontiac	46.905	204.157
27	12	Neil Bonnett	Junior Johnson & Associates	Chevrolet	46.916	204.109
28	73	Phil Barkdoll	Barkdoll Racing	Ford	46.918	204.100
29	81	Chet Fillip (R)	Fillip Racing	Ford	46.989	203.792
30	6	Trevor Boys	U.S. Racing	Chevrolet	46.991	203.783
31	54	Eddie Bierschwale	Gray Racing	Chevrolet	47.000	203.744
32	71	Dave Marcis	Marcis Auto Racing	Pontiac	47.019	203.662
33	90	Ken Schrader	Donlavey Racing	Ford	47.022	203.649
34	99	Connie Saylor	Ball Motorsports	Chevrolet	47.042	203.562
35	0	Delma Cowart	H. L. Waters Racing	Chevrolet	47.059	203.489
36	32	Jim Sauter	Ingle Racing	Chevrolet	47.121	203.221
37	23	Michael Waltrip (R)	Bahari Racing	Pontiac	47.184	202.950
38	94	Doug Heveron	Eller Racing	Pontiac	47.201	202.877
39	48	Ronnie Thomas	Hylton Motorsports	Chevrolet	47.259	202.628
40	52	Jimmy Means	Jimmy Means Racing	Chevrolet	47.274	202.563
Provisionals
41	67	Buddy Arrington	Arrington Racing	Ford	47.279	202.542
42	64	Tommy Gale	Langley Racing	Ford	48.300	198.260
Failed to qualify
43	77	Ken Ragan	Ragan Racing	Chevrolet	47.319	202.371
44	35	Alan Kulwicki (R)	AK Racing	Ford	47.365	202.174
45	02	Mark Martin	Gunderman Racing	Ford	47.523	201.502
46	70	J. D. McDuffie	McDuffie Racing	Pontiac	47.871	200.037
47	95	Davey Allison	Sadler Brothers Racing	Buick	48.218	198.598
48	60	Dick Skillen	Goff Racing	Chevrolet	48.494	197.467
49	78	Steve Moore	Steve Moore Racing	Chevrolet	50.449	189.815
Official first round qualifying results
Official starting lineup

== Race results ==
Fin	St	#	Driver	Team	Make	Laps	Led	Status	Pts	Winnings
1	2	22	Bobby Allison	Stavola Brothers Racing	Buick	188	40	running	180	$77,905
2	14	3	Dale Earnhardt	Richard Childress Racing	Chevrolet	188	18	running	175	$53,900
3	7	88	Buddy Baker	Baker–Schiff Racing	Oldsmobile	188	6	running	170	$27,600
4	10	8	Bobby Hillin Jr.	Stavola Brothers Racing	Buick	188	0	running	160	$21,470
5	11	66	Phil Parsons	Jackson Bros. Motorsports	Oldsmobile	188	0	running	155	$15,525
6	6	47	Morgan Shepherd	Race Hill Farm Team	Buick	188	2	running	155	$11,750
7	18	43	Richard Petty	Petty Enterprises	Pontiac	188	0	running	146	$14,425
8	21	4	Rick Wilson	Morgan–McClure Motorsports	Chevrolet	188	0	running	142	$10,500
9	26	98	Ron Bouchard	Curb Racing	Pontiac	188	1	running	143	$7,900
10	19	10	Greg Sacks	DiGard Motorsports	Pontiac	188	0	running	134	$9,350
11	32	71	Dave Marcis	Marcis Auto Racing	Pontiac	188	2	running	135	$10,455
12	12	25	Tim Richmond	Hendrick Motorsports	Chevrolet	187	0	running	127	$9,835
13	16	27	Rusty Wallace	Blue Max Racing	Pontiac	187	0	running	124	$12,440
14	39	48	Ronnie Thomas	Hylton Motorsports	Chevrolet	185	0	running	121	$8,875
15	38	94	Doug Heveron	Eller Racing	Pontiac	185	0	running	118	$4,940
16	40	52	Jimmy Means	Jimmy Means Racing	Chevrolet	185	0	running	115	$8,115
17	17	26	Joe Ruttman	King Racing	Buick	182	0	running	112	$7,635
18	25	17	Pancho Carter	Hamby Racing	Chevrolet	181	0	running	109	$7,725
19	35	0	Delma Cowart	H. L. Waters Racing	Chevrolet	181	0	running	106	$3,820
20	8	55	Benny Parsons	Jackson Bros. Motorsports	Oldsmobile	180	0	engine	103	$3,735
21	22	33	Harry Gant	Mach 1 Racing	Chevrolet	178	0	engine	100	$12,010
22	41	67	Buddy Arrington	Arrington Racing	Ford	178	0	running	97	$5,855
23	29	81	Chet Fillip (R)	Fillip Racing	Ford	177	0	running	94	$3,670
24	1	9	Bill Elliott	Melling Racing	Ford	175	116	engine	101	$43,070
25	42	64	Tommy Gale	Langley Racing	Ford	175	0	running		$5,845
26	33	90	Ken Schrader	Donlavey Racing	Ford	168	0	running	85	$5,785
27	3	5	Geoff Bodine	Hendrick Motorsports	Chevrolet	157	0	running	82	$10,070
28	28	73	Phil Barkdoll	Barkdoll Racing	Ford	149	1	engine	84	$2,820
29	13	44	Terry Labonte	Hagan Enterprises	Oldsmobile	144	0	engine	76	$9,770
30	31	54	Eddie Bierschwale	Gray Racing	Chevrolet	129	0	transmission	73	$2,720
31	9	7	Kyle Petty	Wood Brothers Racing	Ford	125	0	accident	70	$9,625
32	23	18	Tommy Ellis	Freedlander Motorsports	Chevrolet	117	0	fan blade	67	$2,600
33	34	99	Connie Saylor	Ball Motorsports	Chevrolet	114	0	engine	64	$2,575
34	24	11	Darrell Waltrip	Junior Johnson & Associates	Chevrolet	102	0	engine	61	$13,850
35	37	23	Michael Waltrip (R)	Bahari Racing	Pontiac	92	0	accident	58	$2,525
36	20	15	Ricky Rudd	Bud Moore Engineering	Ford	85	0	engine	55	$10,500
37	4	28	Cale Yarborough	Ranier-Lundy Racing	Ford	63	0	engine	52	$2,575
38	30	6	Trevor Boys	U.S. Racing	Chevrolet	62	2	accident	54	$5,305
39	5	1	Sterling Marlin	Ellington Racing	Chevrolet	48	0	piston	46	$2,500
40	27	12	Neil Bonnett	Junior Johnson & Associates	Chevrolet	40	0	fuel pressure	43	$10,800
41	36	32	Jim Sauter	Ingle Racing	Chevrolet	26	0	vibration	40	$2,400
42	15	75	Jody Ridley	RahMoc Enterprises	Pontiac	4	0	engine	37	$5,135
Failed to qualify
43		77	Ken Ragan	Ragan Racing	Chevrolet					
44		35	Alan Kulwicki (R)	AK Racing	Ford					
45		02	Mark Martin	Gunderman Racing	Ford					
46		70	J. D. McDuffie	McDuffie Racing	Pontiac					
47		95	Davey Allison	Sadler Brothers Racing	Buick					
48		60	Dick Skillen	Goff Racing	Chevrolet					
49		78	Steve Moore	Steve Moore Racing	Chevrolet					
Official race results

== Standings after the race ==
Drivers' Championship standings

	Pos	Driver	Points
1	1	Dale Earnhardt	1,417
1	2	Darrell Waltrip	1,308 (-109)
1	3	Rusty Wallace	1,216 (-204)
3	4	Bobby Allison	1,198 (–219)
2	5	Terry Labonte	1,189 (–228)
1	6	Kyle Petty	1,152 (–265)
1	7	Bill Elliott	1,141 (–276)
	8	Tim Richmond	1,135 (–282)
2	9	Harry Gant	1,084 (–333)
1	10	Geoff Bodine	1,082 (–335)
Official driver's standings

- Note: Only the first 10 positions are included for the driver standings.

Previous race: 1986 Sovran Bank 500	NASCAR Winston Cup Series; 1986 season	Next race: 1986 Budweiser 500
