= Forest Tennant =

American physician (1941–2026)

Mayor of West Covina, California
- In office 1980–1988

Personal details
- Born: Forest Searls Tennant Jr. January 23, 1941 Dodge City, Kansas, U.S.
- Died: August 13, 2026 (aged 85) West Covina, California, U.S.
- Resting place: Forest Lawn—Covina Hills
- Other political affiliations: Republican Party
- Education: University of Missouri, University of Kansas School of Medicine, University of California
- Occupation: Physician, politician, writer, professor, businessman, consultant
- Website: http://www.foresttennant.com/

Military service
- Allegiance: U.S. Army Medical Corps
- Rank: Major

Forest Searls Tennant Jr. (January 23, 1941 – August 13, 2026) was an American physician, writer, businessman, consultant, and politician, who served as the former mayor of West Covina, California. Tennant has earned recognition as an expert in pain management and substance dependence and has also been involved in some controversies.

== Education and early career ==
Tennant was born into a farm family in Dodge City, Kansas. He graduated from the University of Missouri and, in 1966, the University of Kansas School of Medicine. He served in Vietnam as a major in the U.S. Army Medical Corps and was an Army surgeon in Germany, where he first came into contact with patients with drug problems. In 1972, Tennant earned a Doctorate of Public Health at the UCLA School of Public Health of the University of California, Los Angeles. His doctoral thesis was informed by his experience treating service personnel. As a post-doctorate fellow, Tennant was appointed director of UCLA's methadone program, and was an associate professor at the school.

== Physician and writer ==
Tennant specialised in pain management and drug addiction. He was a strong advocate for intractable pain patients, arguing that opioids can be safe and effective even when applied over long durations, and helped push the "Pain Patient's Bill of Rights" law through the California legislature. Tennant had authored over 200 articles and books, including many to help intractable pain patients, and was editor-in-chief of the journal Practical Pain Management. The late Zig Ziglar described Tennant as "perhaps the number one drug authority in the world".

== Businesses and consultancies ==
Until his retirement in 2018, Tennant operated a pain management clinic, Veract Intractable Pain Clinic in West Covina, California. The clinic, opened in 1975, originally focused primarily on cancer patients and post-polio pain.

Tennant had been a substance abuse consultant for the California Department of Justice, the California Highway Patrol (where he taught officers how to recognize symptoms of drug use) and hundreds of private companies, including Texaco and the Southern Pacific Railroad.

He operated a drug testing and drug education consultancy, with clients including the National Football League (NFL), the National Association for Stock Car Auto Racing (NASCAR), and the Los Angeles Dodgers. With the Dodgers, Tennant worked with players including Steve Howe, a promising left-hander whose career was ultimately derailed by substance abuse.

Tennant terminated his relationship with the NFL in April 1989, and Tennant's handling of some matters while working for the NFL, particularly in the Clarence Kay case, were later criticized. Tennant was accused of being involved with reporting a false result of a drug test of NASCAR driver Tim Richmond; the resulting lawsuit was settled out of court, and NASCAR terminated its relationship with Tennant in 1990.

Tennant became involved with methadone clinics in 1972 when he became director of UCLA's methadone treatment program, later creating the nonprofit Community Health Projects, Inc., which operated 29 methadone facilities in California. His clinics were repeatedly cited by California and federal authorities for serious and continuous deficiencies and on several occasions had to reimburse the state for overcharges. In March 1997, following a Drug Enforcement Administration investigation, Tennant and Community Health Projects paid $625,000 to settle allegations that many of his clinics violated record-keeping requirements. According to Assistant U.S. Attorney Lori Richardson Pelliccioni, record-keeping was so poor at the clinics that methadone supplies could not be tracked adequately.

Federal prosecutors said it was the long history of uncorrected violations that forced Tennant and his chain to pay the U.S. government $625,000 and avoid a civil lawsuit. Tennant and Community Health Projects denied wrongdoing and said they were victims of federal rules that were vague, bewildering, inconsistent, unevenly enforced, and contradictory to California law, and that no clinic could withstand the special scrutiny that Community Health Projects received as the state's largest and most visible provider of methadone treatment. Tennant called for new state legislation to clarify methadone regulations.

Tennant developed methods of examining eyes to detect presence of drugs in the system. His "rapid-eye exam" won praise from law enforcement authorities as an effective field drug sobriety test. A home-use version, the "Rapid Eye Check Kit", was developed by Tennant and marketed by an Irvine non-profit group as an aid for parents in detecting teen drug use. Colleges, school districts and businesses in several states adopted the test. This test drew criticism for inaccuracy (including both false positives and false negatives) and intrusiveness. In a civil rights lawsuit challenging the constitutionality of the University of Colorado's student drug-testing program, which included the test, U.S. District Judge Joseph Bellipanni concluded that the test was extremely inaccurate.

It was announced on March 26, 2018, that Tennant would be retiring and therefore closing his pain clinic in the Los Angeles suburb of West Covina. It has been speculated that his retirement was partly due to an ongoing DEA investigation of his opioid prescribing practices.

== Politics and civic involvement ==
Tennant has been active in local Republican politics. He founded the San Gabriel Valley Chapter of the Lincoln Club, a California Republican organization. He has been active in civic charities, is the recipient of an NAACP Service Award, and was West Covina Citizen of the Year.

Tennant served two terms on the West Covina, California city council in 1980–1988 and was also mayor of the city. Tennant was active in efforts to block expansion of landfills in the San Gabriel Valley and was opposed to County Supervisor Pete Schabarum's efforts to block the BKK Corporation landfill in West Covina from accepting trash from Los Angeles and clashed with Schabarum over plans to build a waste-to-energy incinerator in Irwindale. Tennant also worked to block commercial development in Frank C. Bonelli Regional Park.

Tennant sponsored a bill in California, which became law in 1997, to make highly restricted narcotics more available to patients with severe and intractable pain. The law, which includes a "Pain Patient's Bill of Rights", requires doctors to advise patients who suffer from severe, chronic, and intractable pain that narcotics such as Percodan, Demerol and Dilaudid could be prescribed. According to Tennant and bill author Leroy Greene, doctors were failing to prescribe these drugs in the large quantities needed for severe pain relief because they feared prosecution for overprescribing a controlled substance, or because they are philosophically opposed to narcotics because they can create dependency.

== Death ==
Tennant died due to complications from kidney failure on August 13, 2026, in West Covina, at the age of 85.

== Selected publications ==
- Tennant, Forest (2013). The Intractable Pain Patient's Guide to Pain Free Hours (PDF) (3rd ed.). Veract Intractable Pain Clinic. Archived from the original (PDF) on January 2, 2014.
- Tennant, Forest. What To Do While Looking for a GOOD Pain Doctor (PDF). Veract Intractable Pain Clinic. Archived from the original (PDF) on January 2, 2014.
- Forest Tennant (May 2007). "Overcoming Opiophobia & Doing Opioids Right" (PDF). Pain Treatment Topics. SBL Ltd.
- Forest Tennant (2007). "The Intractable Pain Patient's Handbook For Survival" (PDF). Pain Treatment Topics. SBL Ltd.
- Forest Tennant (September 2012). "John F. Kennedy's Pain Story: From Autoimmune Disease To Centralized Pain" (PDF). Practical Pain Management. Archived from the original (PDF) on December 6, 2013.
- Forest Tennant (July–August 2007). "Howard Hughes & Pseudoaddiction" (PDF). Practical Pain Management. Archived from the original (PDF) on September 24, 2015.
- Rawson, Richard A.; Washton, Arnold M.; Resnick, Richard B.; Tennant, Forest S. (1984). "Clonidine Hydrochloride Detoxification from Methadone Treatment—The Value of Naltrexone Aftercare". In Stimmel, Barry; Lowinson, Joyce H. (eds.). Conceptual Issues in Alcoholism and Substance Abuse. Binghamton, New York: Haworth Press. p. 41. ISBN 978-0866563161.
