= Bryan Baker (racing driver) =

American racing driver (born 1961)

Bryan Baker (born June 8, 1961) is a former NASCAR driver. He made one Winston Cup start in 1986 at Dover for the 1986 running of the Delaware 500. He started 36th and finished 29th. He earned $3,985. He also made one Busch Series start, also in 1986, at Bristol. He started 27th and finished 28th. He earned $325.
