= Tim Richmond =

American racing driver (1955–1989)

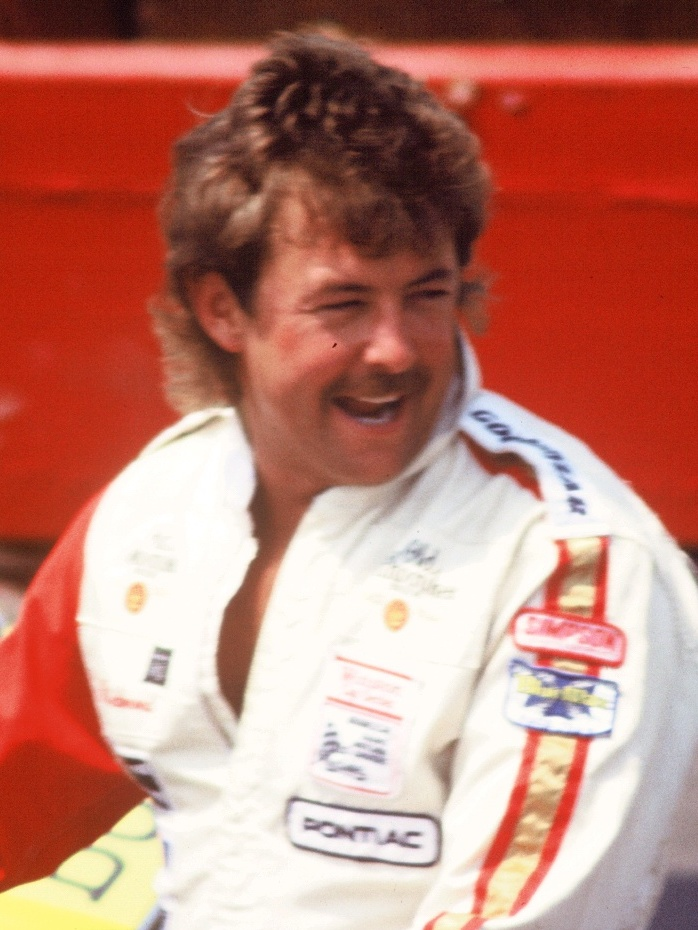
- Richmond prior to the start of the 1984 Firecracker 400.
- Born: June 7, 1955; Ashland, Ohio, U.S.
- Died: August 13, 1989 (aged 34); West Palm Beach, Florida, U.S.
- Cause of death: Complications from HIV/AIDS
- Achievements: 1986 Southern 500 Winner
- Awards: Named one of NASCAR's 50 Greatest Drivers (1998); International Motorsports Hall of Fame inductee (2002); Named one of NASCAR's 75 Greatest Drivers (2023)

NASCAR Cup Series career
- 185 races run over 8 years
- Best finish: 3rd (1986)
- First race: 1980 Coca-Cola 500 (Pocono)
- Last race: 1987 Champion Spark Plug 400 (Michigan)
- First win: 1982 Budweiser 400 (Riverside)
- Last win: 1987 Budweiser 400 (Riverside)
Wins	Top tens	Poles
13	78	14

NASCAR O'Reilly Auto Parts Series career
- 10 races run over 4 years
- Best finish: 48th (1986)
- First race: 1983 Kroger 200 (Indianapolis)
- Last race: 1986 Gatorade 200 (Darlington)
- First win: 1985 Winn-Dixie 300 (Charlotte)
- Last win: 1986 Winn-Dixie 300 (Charlotte)
Wins	Top tens	Poles
2	4	6

Timothy Lee Richmond (June 7, 1955 – August 13, 1989) was an American race car driver from Ashland, Ohio. He competed in IndyCar racing before transferring to NASCAR's Winston Cup Series. Richmond was one of the first drivers to change from open wheel racing to NASCAR stock cars full-time, which later became an industry trend. He won the 1980 Indianapolis 500 Rookie of the Year award and had 13 victories during eight NASCAR seasons.

Richmond achieved his top NASCAR season in 1986 when he finished third in points. He won seven races that season, more than any other driver on the tour. When he missed the season-opening Daytona 500 in February 1987, media reported that he had pneumonia. The infection most likely resulted from his compromised immune system, which was weakened by AIDS. Despite the state of his health, Richmond competed in eight races in 1987, winning two events and one pole position before his final race in August of that year. He attempted a comeback in 1988 before NASCAR banned him for testing positive for excessive over-the-counter drugs, ibuprofen and pseudoephedrine; NASCAR later announced it gave Richmond a new test and tested negative. Richmond filed a lawsuit against NASCAR after the organization insisted it wanted access to his entire medical record before it would reinstate him. After losing the lawsuit, Richmond withdrew from racing. NASCAR later stated its original test was a "bad test."

Richmond grew up in a wealthy family and lived a freewheeling lifestyle, earning him the nickname "Hollywood". In describing Richmond's influence in racing, Charlotte Motor Speedway president Humpy Wheeler said, "We've never had a race driver like Tim in stock car racing. He was almost a James Dean-like character." When Richmond was cast for a bit part in the 1983 movie Stroker Ace, "He fell right in with the group working on the film," said director Hal Needham. Cole Trickle, the main character in the movie Days of Thunder, played by Tom Cruise, was loosely based on Richmond and his interaction with Harry Hyde and Rick Hendrick.

== Early life ==
Richmond grew up in Ashland, Ohio. His parents, Al and Evelyn (née Warner) Richmond, met in the course of their work. Al was a welder for pipe construction companies and Evelyn was a field office manager. Noticing that highway crews had to dig up the entire highway to lay pipe, Al designed a machine to bore underneath the highway. To market this invention, he founded Richmond Manufacturing, which eventually exported machines worldwide.

Tim's driving days started as a toddler when he was given a go-kart that he often drove inside buildings and across his lawn. He later raced the kart at tracks in Moreland and New Pittsburg. Richmond grew up in a well-to-do family, and was sometimes therefore treated differently by his classmates, so his parents enrolled him in Miami Military Academy in Miami, Florida. During his years in Miami, Tim and his mother moved to Florida and his father stayed in Ohio. While home in Ohio over a summer break, he met local drag racer Raymond Beadle through lifelong friend Fred Miller. When Richmond reached the age of sixteen, his parents purchased him a Pontiac Trans Am, a speedboat and a Piper Cherokee airplane for his birthday. Yet his mother Evelyn often worried about spoiling her only son. She once said, "Tim was lazy...", and "... I did everything for him. I ruined him, I admit it. He was my whole life."

Richmond excelled in sports; he set a conference record in high hurdles and his high school football career was stellar enough that the academy retired his sports jersey after his gridiron days were over. Miami Military Academy named him Athlete of the Year in 1970. Richmond's other interests included flying, and he earned his private pilot license at age 16. Following high school graduation, Richmond attended Ashland University for about one year before dropping out.

== Racing career ==
=== Open wheel racing ===
A friend of Richmond's father co-owned a sprint car and Richmond joined the team as a crew member for Dave Shoemaker. In 1976, 21-year-old Richmond took the car onto Lakeville Speedway at Lakeville, Ohio for some practice laps. "Somebody put a stopwatch on me," Richmond said. "I was running laps faster than Dave had been. It was the first time I had ever driven a race car." Richmond and his father found a red, white and blue-colored No. 98 car in Pennsylvania, which was the same number and paint scheme that Richmond used on model cars as a child. In his first competition at the track, officials placed Richmond in the slowest heat. He passed several cars before spinning out and breaking an axle. Although he made several attempts to get the car pointed in the right direction, the broken axle prevented the car from driving straight. After being towed to the pits, he parked the car for the rest of the event. Later that season, they towed the car to Eldora Speedway, only to have Richmond crash the car again. In response, Richmond's father fired him as the driver. The next season, Al Richmond bought a SuperModified better suited to his son's driving style. In 1977, Tim Richmond became both Sandusky Speedway's Rookie of the Year and the SuperModified class track champion.

Richmond returned to racing sprint cars in the United States Automobile Club's (USAC) national sprint car tour in 1978. Competing in 12 races, he finished 30th in points as the series' Rookie of the Year. That year he attended Jim Russell's road racing school at Willow Springs International Motorsports Park, setting a student course record. Richmond raced in a 1978 Mini Indy car event at Phoenix International Raceway, winning the Formula Super Vee support event in a Lola T620. The win attracted sponsors and attention from major owners like Roger Penske. He also competed in USAC's Silver Crown series.

Richmond's father bought an Eagle Indy Car chassis and an Offenhauser engine for the 1979 race at Michigan International Speedway. Richmond qualified 21st fastest with a 175.768 mph (282.871 km/h) lap, significantly slower than Bobby Unser's 203.879 mph (328.111 km/h) pole position speed. The race ended for him when his motor blew up on the fourth lap, and he finished last (23rd). Owner Pat Santello was looking for a driver to replace Larry Rice for his CART team at the following race at Watkins Glen International, so he gave Richmond a test at Willow Springs Raceway where he had previously set the student record. Santello hired Richmond, who then qualified 15th fastest for the event and finished in eighth place, the best of his IndyCar career. Richmond raced in three more events that season.

Also in 1979, Richmond tested Kenny Reece's unusual "3-to-1" Supermodified at a 7.5-mile high-speed oval test track in Ohio. The car was unique in that it featured 3 wheels on the right side for added grip on oval tracks, but only 1 wheel on the center of the left side, along with a left-offset aluminum Chevrolet ZL-1 V8 engine. Richmond was able to lap the test track at over 200 MPH, but found doing so in a car with no left front wheel slightly unnerving. The car was tested, but outlawed before it could actually be raced.

During practice for the 1980 Indianapolis 500, Richmond set the fastest unofficial practice speed of the month, besting even race favorite Johnny Rutherford in the vaunted Chaparral. His hopes for the pole were dashed with a crash in morning practice on the first day of qualifying. After repairs he qualified nineteenth for the race. He worked his way up to the top-ten during the race, led a lap, and finished ninth as he ran out of fuel at the end of the race. To the delight of the crowd, winner Rutherford gave him a ride back to the pits. He was named the 1980 Indianapolis 500 Rookie of the Year. "I busted up a few Indy cars right after that," he said. "Milwaukee, Mid-Ohio. . . at Michigan I cut one in two. I was afraid my racing career would come to a halt. So when I got an offer to drive stock cars, I took it, and it turned out I liked driving them better."

=== NASCAR ===
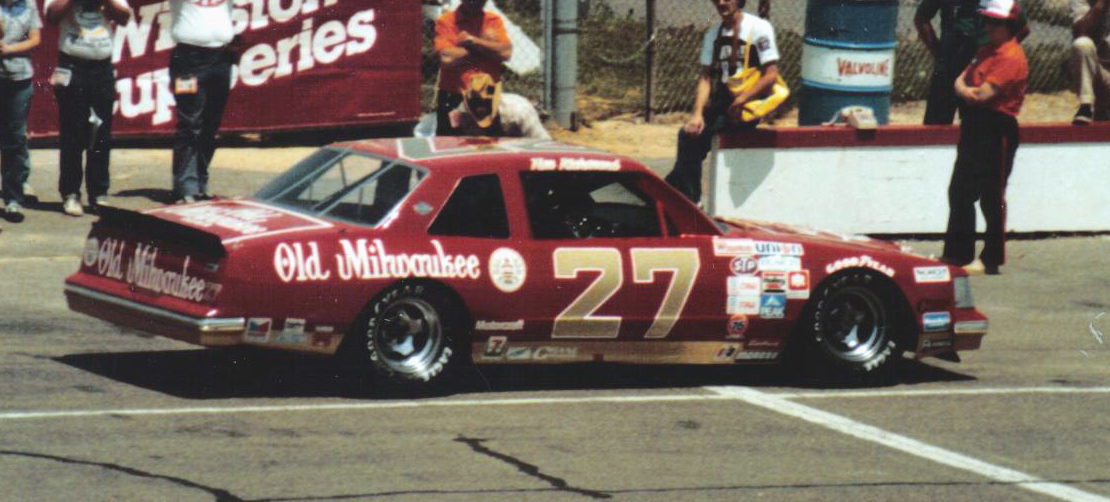
Richmond's car in 1983

Pocono Raceway President Joseph Mattioli III convinced Richmond to make the change to stock car racing on the NASCAR circuit. Richmond made his first NASCAR start two months after winning the Indianapolis 500 Rookie of the Year award. He debuted at the Coca-Cola 500 at Pocono on July 27, 1980, finishing twelfth in a D. K. Ulrich-owned Chevrolet. That season, he competed in five events, with two DNFs (did not finish) and three twelfth place finishes. Overall, he finished the 1980 season 41st in points.

Richmond raced for three teams in 1981. He started the season by competing in 15 events for Ulrich. He had his first career top-ten finish, taking tenth place at Bristol Motor Speedway, soon followed by a sixth at Talladega and a seventh-place finish at Texas World Speedway. After Kennie Childers hired him away from Ulrich mid-season, Richmond had top-ten finishes at Pocono and Bristol. For the final seven races of the season, he drove for Bob Rogers and had a top 10 finish at Dover International Speedway. Overall for the season, Richmond had six top 10 finishes to place 16th in season points.

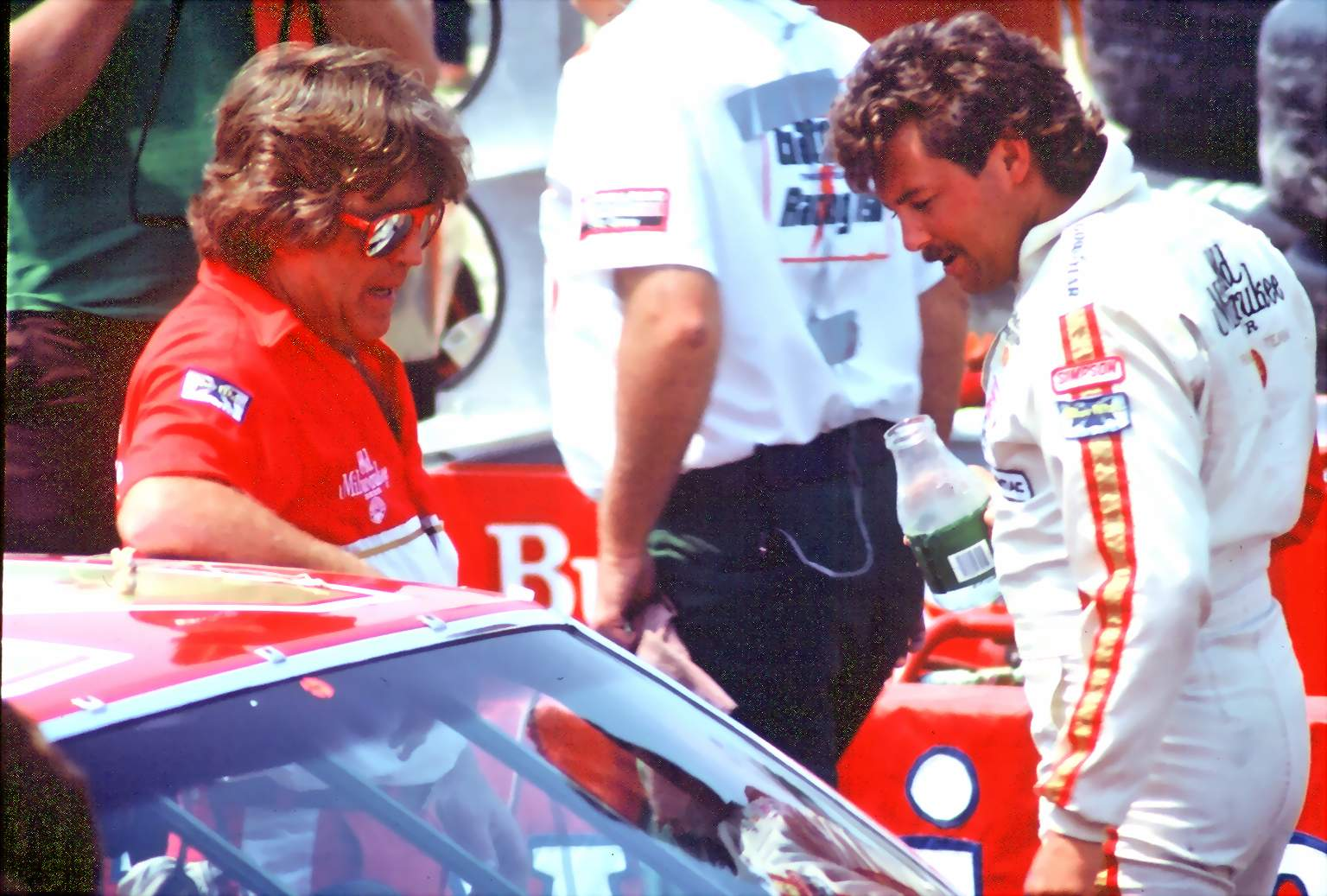
Richmond (right) talking with a crew member

Richmond started 1982 without a ride before getting a one-race deal to drive for Mike Lovern's Fast Company Limited, Billie Harvey, at the Rockingham track. Richmond completed 112 laps of the 492-lap event to finish 31st, retiring from the race with engine problems. For the following event, Richmond was hired to drive J.D. Stacy's No. 2 car. In his first race for the team, Richmond earned his first career top-five finish when he placed fifth at Darlington Raceway. Returning to Pocono, he finished second, before winning his first race on the road course at Riverside, California the following week. Later that season, he earned his first pole position at Bristol. The tour returned to Riverside for the final race of the season where Richmond won his second race, sweeping both events at the track. Benny Parsons said that "watching Richmond go through the Esses was unbelievable". For the season, Richmond had twelve top-tens, two wins, and one pole to finish 26th in points.

In 1983, Richmond began racing for Raymond Beadle whom he had known before he started racing and gained sponsorship from Old Milwaukee beer. He returned to the three-cornered Pocono racetrack, earning his first oval victory. During the season, he accumulated four pole positions (Darlington, Pocono, Charlotte, and Atlanta), one win (Pocono), and fifteen top 10s on his way to finishing tenth in season points. He made his first appearance in a NASCAR Busch Series car, but did not finish any of the three races he entered that season.

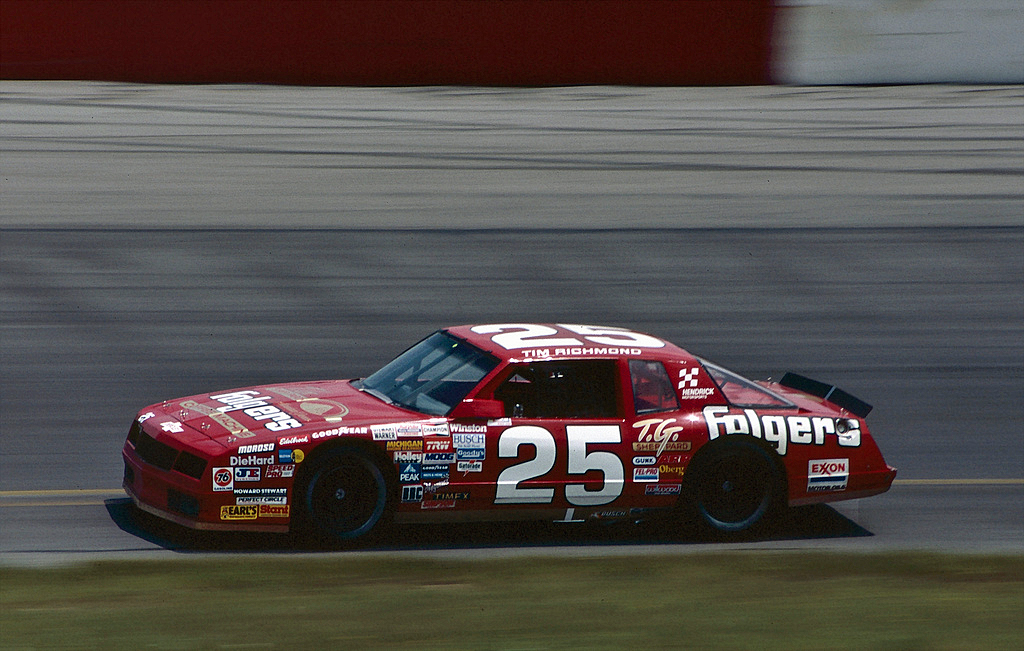
Richmond in Hendrick's No. 25

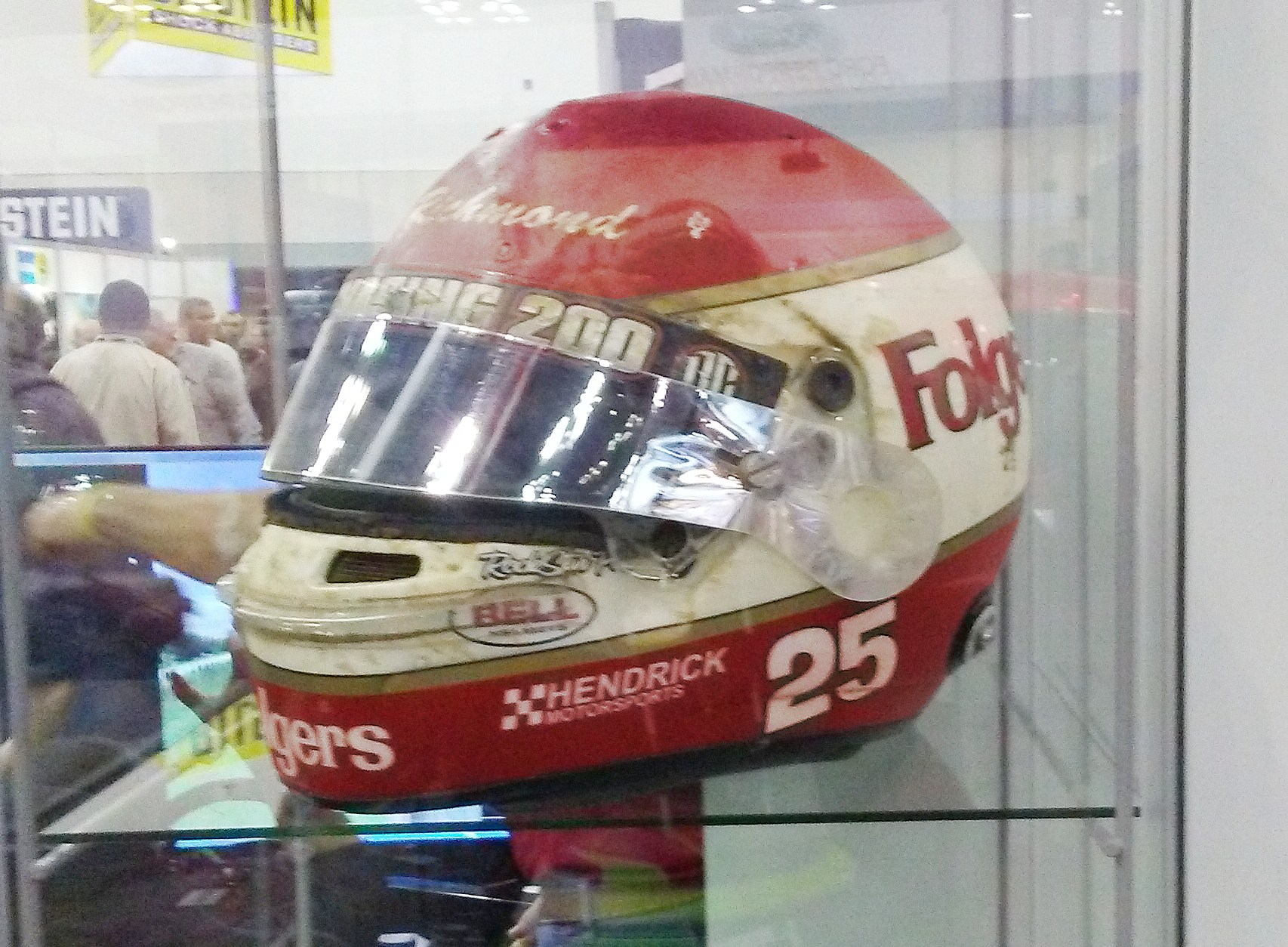
Tim Richmond Helmet

Esquire magazine named Richmond as one of "the best of the new generation" in 1984. That year he had one win at North Wilkesboro Speedway and second-place finishes at Dover, Darlington and Riverside. Richmond finished the 1984 season 12th in points, with eleven finishes in the top ten and in six in the top-five. In 1985, the final season that Richmond competed for Beadle, his best finish was a second place run at Bristol. He ended the season eleventh in points with thirteen top-tens in 28 races. His crew chief for the season was newcomer Barry Dodson who won the 1989 championship with Rusty Wallace. In the Busch Series, he qualified at the pole position in the two races he entered, and won the Charlotte race.

Richmond joined Hendrick Motorsports in 1986, where he teamed up with veteran crew chief Harry Hyde and drove what became his signature car, the #25 Folgers "Coffee Machine" with additional backing from country singer and racing fan T.G. Sheppard. It took the team until the middle of the season to gel. Richmond had suffered a 64-race winless streak that was finally broken at the Van Scoy Diamond Mine 500 at Pocono in June 1986. After two straight second-place finishes at Charlotte and Riverside, Richmond started the Pocono event in third place inside the second row. That race saw a caution for rain with five laps left before the halfway point. NASCAR wanted the cars to get to the halfway point to make the race official, so the sanctioning body had the drivers slowly circle the track. It took the drivers 26 minutes to complete the laps, and the rain was so heavy that some drivers had to look out their side windows because they could not see out their windshields. Two hours later, the track had dried and the race resumed with Richmond in third. After Richmond's car was adjusted to remove the "push", the car was more to his liking. Because his radio did not work, he was unable to communicate with his crew chief, Hyde, and he made his final pit stop with 37 laps left. Hyde worried that Richmond had stopped a lap too early to ensure that he would have enough fuel to make it to the end. After Richmond took the lead with thirty laps left in the race, Dale Earnhardt made up three seconds on Richmond's five-second lead. With four laps to go, Buddy Arrington spun in a three-car accident. The remaining laps of the race where completed slowly under caution and Richmond took the checkered flag for the victory. He had led 97 laps, including the final thirty, taking his first victory in a Rick Hendrick car.

The tour returned to Pocono a month later, and Richmond battled for another victory in a fog-shortened event. In the final 8-lap sprint, Richmond competed in a three-car battle with Geoff Bodine and Ricky Rudd. Richmond crossed the finish line beside Rudd, winning the race by 0.05 seconds. He notched four more victories that season, and over a span of twelve races, Richmond earned three second-place finishes, and six wins. The National Motorsports Press Association named him Co-Driver of the Year with Earnhardt after Richmond accumulated 13 top 5 finishes and 16 in the top 10. He had a career-best third place finish in points after winning seven events in 1986, in what was his last full NASCAR season.

== Illness and death ==
Richmond fell ill the day after the 1986 NASCAR annual banquet during a promotional trip to New York City. He was not well enough to begin the 1987 NASCAR season despite lengthy hospitalization in Cleveland and further rest at home; when Richmond missed the Daytona 500, his condition was reported as double pneumonia. Media later reported that he had Acquired Immune Deficiency Syndrome (AIDS). He returned to Pocono for the Miller High Life 500 during the middle of the year. Starting third, he led by the fifth lap and ultimately led 82 laps, including the final 46, to win the race by eight car-lengths over Bill Elliott. In the middle of the race, Richmond's car suffered gearbox problems. Because he could use only fourth (high) gear, he had to use that gear to slowly exit the pits. Richmond was emotional after the victory, saying, "I had tears in my eyes when I took the checkered flag. Then every time anyone congratulated me, I started bawling again." Richmond earned a victory in the next race at Riverside, and made his final 1987 start at Michigan International Speedway's Champion Spark Plug 400 that August, finishing 29th with a blown engine. He resigned from Hendrick Motorsports in September 1987.

Although Richmond attempted a comeback in 1988, NASCAR suspended him for testing positive for banned substances. Days later, the substances were identified as Sudafed, a non-prescription over-the-counter allergy medication, and Advil, an over-the-counter pain reliever. In April 1988, Richmond sued NASCAR over the suspension. In the 2010 ESPN documentary film Tim Richmond: To The Limit, NASCAR president Bill France Jr. said the drug screen administered "was not a good test," vaguely admitting that the entire testing program was just a sham to entrap Richmond. But more importantly, NASCAR also demanded he release his medical records to them, which he refused. Although he retested later that year and was reinstated, he could not find a car to drive. In his final public appearance at a contentious press conference at Daytona in February 1988, Richmond vehemently denied that he abused drugs and said that a mistake had been made in his drug test before storming off. His suit with NASCAR was settled out-of-court, the terms sealed.

Richmond then withdrew to his family's condo in Florida, receiving few visitors except for immediate family and a few friends, including Dr. Jerry Punch and A.J. Foyt. There were by then rumors of HIV and AIDS, which he denied. He was later hospitalized in West Palm Beach.

ESPN sent a get-well-soon card to Richmond when it aired the July 1989 NASCAR race at Pocono. The television network showed highlights of Richmond's victory at the track from 1986. "Tim had Hollywood good looks and the charisma of Tom Cruise," said his friend Dr. Jerry Punch. "There he was in victory lane with the team all around him and beauty queens hanging all over him. It was important for the people at the hospital to see Tim the way he really was, when he was healthy and handsome and vital, not the way he was as they saw him every day in the hospital. There were tears everywhere."

On August 13, 1989, Richmond died at the age of 34, about two years after his final NASCAR race. He was buried in Ashland, Ohio.

The secrecy surrounding the circumstance of his death caused speculation for several days. Two weeks previously, Dr. Punch stated that Richmond had been hospitalized due to a motorcycle accident, though it is unlikely that Richmond had the strength to ride a motorcycle during his last months. Ten days after his death, on August 23, the Richmond family held a press conference to reveal that Richmond died from complications from AIDS, which he acquired from an unknown woman. Richmond's physician, Dr. David Dodson, said: "There's no way of knowing who that woman was. Tim was a celebrity with a lot of charisma, a handsome guy. He naturally attracted a lot of women." Punch later claimed that more than 90 drivers and personnel underwent HIV testing in the wake of Richmond's death.

== Legacy ==
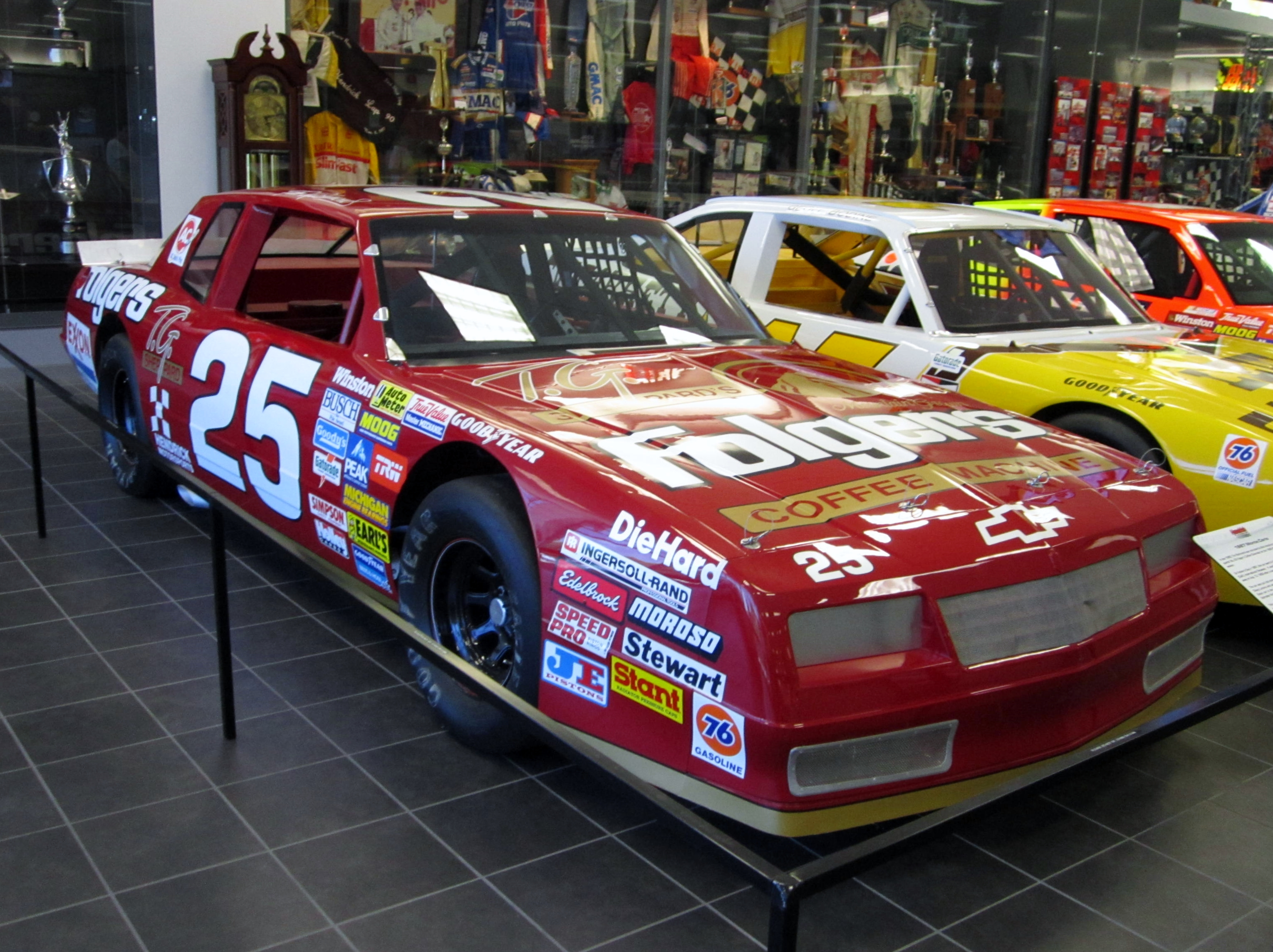
Richmond's No. 25 on display at the Hendrick Motorsports shops in 2013

In 1990, a few months after Richmond's death, Washington television station WJLA-TV and reporter Roberta Baskin reported that Dr. Forest Tennant, who was then the National Football League's drug adviser, "falsified drug tests" that ultimately helped shorten Richmond's NASCAR career. Baskin reported that sealed court documents and interviews showed Tennant and NASCAR used "allegedly false drug-test results in 1988 to bar Richmond from racing". Baskin also stated that NASCAR had targeted Richmond, requesting that Tennant establish a substance-abuse policy with Richmond in mind. A series of drug tests and falsely reported positive results shortly before the 1988 Daytona 500 kept Richmond from driving in what was to have been his last big race...", the report said. The New York Times published the findings. While neither Tennant nor NASCAR supplied an official response at the time, NASCAR did confirm that they were seeking to replace Tennant.

The Ashland County Sports Hall of Fame inducted Richmond in their second class in 1996. In 1998, NASCAR named Richmond one of its 50 greatest drivers of all time. He was inducted into the International Motorsports Hall of Fame in 2002. The Mansfield Motorsports Park ARCA Re/Max Series race in 2009 was named the Tim Richmond Memorial ARCA Re/Max 250 in honor of the area native. The race at Mansfield was co-promoted by Mattioli's son Joseph Mattioli III.

The documentary film Tim Richmond: To the Limit was produced as part of ESPN's 30 for 30 series with a premiere date of October 19, 2010.

In 2018, Dalton Sargeant drove the No. 25 truck for GMS Racing in honor of Richmond.

From 2019 to 2022, ARCA Menards Series driver Tim Richmond, who shares the same name ran identical paint schemes with his cars to Richmond's No. 25 when he drove for Hendrick. Alex Bowman sported a Richmond throwback scheme at the 2019 Bojangles' Southern 500 at Darlington Speedway during Throwback Weekend to his No. 25 Folgers car. In 2022 Kyle Larson would run a throwback to Richmond's No. 0 that he ran at Charlotte. Tyler Reddick would sport one at the 2024 Goodyear 400 which was based on Richmond's 1982 Daytona car.

== Motorsports career results ==
=== American open wheel ===
==== CART Series ====
(key) (Races in bold indicate pole position)

Year	Team	Chassis	Engine	1	2	3	4	5	6	7	8	9	10	11	12	13	14	Rank	Points
1979	Mach 1 Racing	Eagle	Offenhauser	PHX	ATL	ATL	INDY	TRE	TRE	MCH; 23	MCH							22nd	112
1979	S&M Electric	Lightning	Offenhauser									WGL; 8	TRE; 12	ONT; 26	MCH	ATL	PHX; 15	22nd	112
1980	Mach 1 Racing	Penske	Cosworth	ONT	INDY; 9	MIL; DNQ	POC	MDO; 21	MCH; 26	WGL	MIL	ONT	MCH	MEX	PHX			30th	209

==== USAC Champ Car series ====
Year	Team	Chassis	Engine	1	2	3	4	5	6	Rank	Points
1980	Mach 1 Racing	Penske	Cosworth	ONT	INDY; 9	MIL; DNQ	POC	MDO; 21		18th	205
1981-82	Mach 1 Racing	Parnelli	Cosworth	INDY; 14	POC	SPR	DQSF	ISF	INDY	34th	25

==== Indianapolis 500 ====
Year	Chassis	Engine	Start	Finish	Team
1980	Penske	Cosworth	19	9	Mach 1 Racing
1981	Parnelli	Cosworth	33	14	Mach 1 Racing

=== NASCAR ===
(key) (Bold – Pole position awarded by qualifying time. Italics – Pole position earned by points standings or practice time. * – Most laps led.)

==== Winston Cup Series ====
NASCAR Winston Cup Series results
Year	Team	No.	Make	1	2	3	4	5	6	7	8	9	10	11	12	13	14	15	16	17	18	19	20	21	22	23	24	25	26	27	28	29	30	31	NWCC	Pts	Ref
1980	Ulrich Racing	40	Chevy	RSD	DAY	RCH	CAR	ATL	BRI	DAR	NWS	MAR	TAL	NSV	DOV	CLT	TWS	RSD	MCH	DAY	NSV	POC; 12	TAL	MCH	BRI	DAR	RCH	DOV; 31	NWS	MAR; 12	CLT; 12	CAR			41st	503	
1980	Ulrich Racing	6	Chevy																														ATL; 29	ONT	41st	503	
1981	Ulrich Racing	99	Chevy	RSD; 29																															16th	3091	
1981	Ulrich Racing	99	Buick		DAY; 30	RCH; 17	CAR; 16	ATL; 26	BRI; 10	NWS; 18	DAR; 12	MAR; 14	TAL; 6	NSV; 12	DOV	CLT		RSD; 33																	16th	3091	
1981	Ulrich Racing	99	Olds														TWS; 7																		16th	3091	
1981	Kennie Childers Racing	12	Olds																MCH; 14			POC; 12			BRI; 8										16th	3091	
1981	Kennie Childers Racing	12	Buick																	DAY; 15			TAL; 34	MCH; 30		DAR; 22	RCH; 14								16th	3091	
1981	RahMoc Enterprises	75	Chevy																		NSV; 12														16th	3091	
1981	Rogers Racing	37	Buick																									DOV; 9	MAR; 20	NWS; 13	CLT; 18	CAR; 22	ATL; 21	RSD; 20	16th	3091	
1982	Billie Harvey	29	Ford	DAY; DNQ	RCH	BRI	ATL	CAR; 31																											26th	2497	
1982	Jim Stacy Racing	2	Buick						DAR; 5	NWS; 11	MAR; 18	TAL; 7	NSV; 7	DOV; 9	CLT; 40	POC; 2	RSD; 1	MCH; 25	DAY; 23	NSV; 5	POC; 24	TAL; 7	MCH; 23	**BRI**; 25	DAR; 30	RCH; 2	DOV; 9	NWS; 22	CLT; 19	MAR; 13	CAR; 17	ATL; 4	RSD; 1*		26th	2497	
1983	Blue Max Racing	27	Pontiac	DAY; 41	RCH; 17	CAR; 7	ATL; 9	**DAR**; 35	NWS; 28	MAR; 15	TAL; 27	NSV; 10	DOV; 30	BRI; 10	CLT; 40	RSD; 28	POC; 4	MCH; 3	DAY; 31	NSV; 3	**POC**; 1	TAL; 3	MCH; 5	BRI; 22	DAR; 26	RCH; 23	DOV; 3	MAR; 26	NWS; 10	**CLT**; 5*	CAR; 2*	**ATL**; 29	RSD; 5		10th	3612	
1984	Blue Max Racing	27	Pontiac	DAY; 33	RCH; 7	CAR; 27	ATL; 34	BRI; 5	NWS; 1	DAR; 34	MAR; 23	TAL; 26	NSV; 28	DOV; 2	CLT; 10	RSD; 6	POC; 5	MCH; 16	DAY; 11	NSV; 14	POC; 9	TAL; 33	MCH; 15	BRI; 25	DAR; 2	RCH; 20	DOV; 28	MAR; 21	CLT; 30	NWS; 13	CAR; 8	ATL; 13	RSD; 2		12th	3505	
1985	Blue Max Racing	27	Pontiac	DAY; 35	RCH; 9	CAR; 11	ATL; 30	BRI; 30	DAR; 3	NWS; 11	MAR; 21	TAL; 16	DOV; 6	CLT; 9	RSD; 9	POC; 10	MCH; 4	DAY; 28	POC; 30	TAL; 13	MCH; 40	BRI; 2	DAR; 11	RCH; 14	DOV; 6	MAR; 7*	NWS; 7	CLT; 6	CAR; 6	ATL; 17	RSD; 37				11th	3413	
1986	Hendrick Motorsports	25	Chevy	DAY; 20	RCH; 22	CAR; 16	ATL; 7	BRI; 8	DAR; 5	NWS; 12	**MAR**; 20	TAL; 12	DOV; 32	CLT; 2	RSD; 2*	POC; 1*	**MCH**; 15	DAY; 1	POC; 1	TAL; 2	**GLN**; 1	MCH; 2	BRI; 6	**DAR**; 1*	RCH; 1	DOV; 26	MAR; 10	**NWS**; 11	**CLT**; 27*	**CAR**; 20	ATL; 4	**RSD**; 1			3rd	4147	
1987	Hendrick Motorsports	25	Chevy	DAY	CAR	RCH	ATL	DAR	NWS	BRI	MAR	TAL	CLT	DOV	POC; 1*	RSD; 1	MCH; 4	DAY; 22	**POC**; 29	TAL; 11	GLN; 10	MCH; 29	BRI	DAR	RCH	DOV	MAR	NWS	CLT	CAR	RSD	ATL			36th	1063	

===== Daytona 500 =====
Year	Team	Manufacturer	Start	Finish
1981	Ulrich Racing	Pontiac	40	30
1982	Billie Harvey	Ford	DNQ	
1983	Blue Max Racing	Pontiac	24	41
1984	Blue Max Racing	Pontiac	10	33
1985	Blue Max Racing	Pontiac	33	35
1986	Hendrick Motorsports	Chevrolet	37	20

==== Busch Series ====
NASCAR Busch Series results
Year	Team	No.	Make	1	2	3	4	5	6	7	8	9	10	11	12	13	14	15	16	17	18	19	20	21	22	23	24	25	26	27	28	29	30	31	32	33	34	35	NBSC	Pts	Ref
1983		71	Olds	DAY	RCH	CAR	HCY	MAR	NWS	SBO	GPS	LGY	DOV	BRI	CLT	SBO	HCY	ROU	SBO	ROU	CRW	ROU	SBO	HCY	LGY	IRP; 18	GPS	BRI	HCY										72nd	282	
1983	Whitaker Racing	7	Pontiac																											DAR; 21	RCH	NWS	SBO	MAR	ROU				72nd	282	
1983	Whitaker Racing	77	Pontiac																																	CLT; 30	HCY	MAR	72nd	282	
1984	All Star Racing	15	Pontiac	DAY	RCH	CAR	HCY	MAR	DAR	ROU	NSV	LGY	MLW	DOV	CLT; 29	SBO	HCY	ROU	SBO	ROU	HCY	IRP	LGY	SBO	BRI	DAR	RCH	NWS											71st	155	
1984	All Star Racing	0	Pontiac																										**CLT**; 5	HCY	CAR	MAR							71st	155	
1985	Hendrick Motorsports	15	Pontiac	DAY	CAR	HCY	BRI	MAR	DAR	SBO	LGY	DOV	**CLT**; 1*	SBO	HCY	ROU	IRP	SBO	LGY	HCY	MLW	BRI	**DAR**; 23*	RCH	NWS	ROU	CLT	HCY	CAR	MAR									65th	180	
1986	Hendrick Motorsports	15	Pontiac	DAY	CAR	HCY	MAR	BRI	**DAR**; 27	SBO	LGY	JFC	DOV	**CLT**; 1*	SBO	HCY	ROU	IRP	SBO	RAL	OXF	SBO	HCY	LGY	ROU	BRI	**DAR**; 4	RCH	DOV	MAR	ROU	CLT	CAR	MAR					49th	340	

== See also ==
- Tim Richmond: To the Limit
- List of NASCAR race wins by Hendrick Motorsports

Sporting positions
Preceded by Howdy Holmes	Indianapolis 500; Rookie of the Year; 1980	Succeeded by Josele Garza
