= 1986 Champion Spark Plug 400 =

Auto race held at Michigan International Speedway in 1986

Race details
- Race 19 of 29 in the 1986 NASCAR Winston Cup Series season
- 1986 Champion Spark Plug 400
- Date: August 17, 1986
- Official name: Champion Spark Plug 400
- Location: Michigan International Speedway, Brooklyn, Michigan
- Course length: 2.000 miles (3.218 km)
- Distance: 200 laps, 400 mi (643 km)
- Weather: Very hot with temperatures of 84 °F (29 °C); wind speeds of 12 miles per hour (19 km/h)
- Average speed: 135.376 miles per hour (217.867 km/h)
- Attendance: 64,000

Pole position
Driver	Benny Parsons	Leo & Richard Jackson

Most laps led
Driver	Bill Elliott	Melling Racing
- Laps: 115

Winner
No. 9	Bill Elliott	Melling Racing

Television in the United States
- Network: ESPN
- Announcers: Jack Arute, Jerry Punch

The 1986 Champion Spark Plug 400 was a NASCAR Winston Cup Series racing event that was held on August 17, 1986, at Michigan International Speedway in Brooklyn, Michigan.

Michigan International Speedway has been a Ford dominated track starting in 1984, and a Mercury track before that from 1969-78. It was also a track that suited a smooth driver or a driver that could change his driving tactics for Michigan International Speedway.

== Background ==
Michigan International Speedway is a four-turn superspeedway that is 2 miles (3.2 km) long. Opened in 1968, the track's turns are banked at eighteen degrees, while the 3,600-foot-long front stretch, the location of the finish line, is banked at twelve degrees. The back stretch, has a five degree banking and is 2,242 feet long.

Groundbreaking took place on September 28, 1967. Over 2.5 million cubic yards (1.9×10^{6} m^{3}) of dirt were moved to form the D-shaped oval. The track opened in 1968 with a total capacity of 25,000 seats. The track was originally built and owned by Lawrence H. LoPatin, a Detroit-area land developer who built the speedway at an estimated cost of $4–6 million. Financing was arranged by Thomas W Itin. Its first race took place on Sunday, October 13, 1968, with the running of the USAC 250 mile Championship Car Race won by Ronnie Bucknum.

In 1972, Roger Penske purchased the speedway for an estimated $2 million. During Penske's ownership, the track was upgraded several times from the original capacity to 125,000 seating capacity.

== Race report ==
There were 41 drivers on the starting grid for this event. Gary Fedewa (uncle of later Busch Series driver Tim Fedewa), Dick Trickle, USAC veteran Cliff Hucul of Canada, Ronnie Thomas, Joe Booher, and Howard Mark failed to qualify for this race. In this 200-lap event, Buddy Baker deserved his last-place finish due to a problem with the rear end of his vehicle on lap 27. Various problems including engine troubles and crashes caused several drivers not to finish the race. All of the drivers in this racing event were born in the United States of America, and prior to the green flag the total number of Winston Cup wins among all 41 drivers equaled 672, and a total of 20 Winston Cups.

Sixty-four thousand people witnessed a race lasting for almost three hours. Bill Elliott managed to defeat Tim Richmond by almost one and a half seconds. Tim Richmond continued his hot streak across the summer stretch, leading five laps and finishing in second place. Richmond charged from the tail-end of the lead pack to second on the final restart after being penalized by NASCAR for pitting too early under caution. After getting his lap back, Richmond charged through the field to take second.

Benny Parsons earned the pole position for this racing event by driving up to 171.924 miles per hour (276.685 km/h) during qualifying. While the opening laps in the race saw four different drivers duel each other for the lead, only Bill Elliott and Darrell Waltrip would be able to fight for the first-place position on the closing laps. Darrell Waltrip ran a clean race, staying inside the top-5 for most of the afternoon and leading 3 laps. He was rewarded with a third-place finish. Michael Waltrip would become the lowest-finishing driver to finish the race; even though he only logged in 122 laps of actual racing. Greg Sacks was involved in an accident on lap 63 while Morgan Shepherd had a similar collision on lap 83. There was a two-car crash on lap 173 involving Kyle Petty and Jim Hull. The last accident of the race occurred on lap 187 involving Benny Parsons.

Geoff Bodine led 21 laps en route to a fourth-place finish. Bodine easily had the best car before the competition caution NASCAR scheduled to check tire wear. After the competition caution, Bodine was unable to find the top spot for the rest of the afternoon. Dale Earnhardt finished a lap down in fifth place. Earnhardt was the only driver able to keep up with Bill Elliott, leading 34 laps throughout the day. After getting caught a lap down during a round of green-flag pitstops, Earnhardt settled for a top-5. Rusty Wallace managed to lead a lap and came home in sixth, one lap down. Wallace was driving on the edge for most of the race, nearly spinning out at one point while battling with Morgan Shepherd for position.

Bill Elliott looked like his 1985 self, leading 125 of 200 laps and claiming his second victory of the season. The win was his fourth consecutive victory at Michigan and his fifth victory in six races at the speedway. Between 1984 and 1987, Elliott won all but two races at Michigan. The most dominant drivers in the NASCAR Winston Cup Series during the 1980s were Bill Elliott, Darrell Waltrip, Terry Labonte, Bobby Allison, and Dale Earnhardt.

Cale Yarborough recovered from a terrible qualifying effort to finish seventh, one lap down. Yarborough drafted with Bobby Allison into the top-10 by lap 20 and was challenging the leaders at one point before falling a lap down. Harry Gant finished a lap down in eighth, ending what had been a brutal four-race stretch in which he suffered engine failure at Daytona, crashed hard at Pocono and Talladega, and blown his motor at Watkins Glen. Phil Parsons nabbed his third top-ten finish of the season with a ninth-place run, though he was a lap down. Like many others, Parsons was caught out by a caution during green-flag pitstops, which is why so many drivers in the top-10 were a lap down at the finish.

The total prize purse for the contenders in this event was $345,585 ($991,327 in today's American dollars). Winnings for each individual driver varied from $55,950 ($160,495 in today's American dollars) to a meager $1,185 ($3,399 in today's American dollars).

=== Introductions and retirements ===
Benny Parsons would make his final pole position start here while David Pearson and Jim Hull would make their respective exits from the NASCAR Cup Series after this event was over. In the final start of his legendary career, David Pearson showed that he could still be competitive, running as high as third and finishing in tenth place, one lap off the pace.

Pearson would go on to become "racing royalty" at Michigan International Speedway due to his incredible performances on that race track alone. While starting an average of 8th place on all NASCAR races that took place on Michigan International Speedway, Pearson's average finish of 12th place would be accompanied by nine other MIS racing victories and twenty finishes in the "top ten."

== Results ==
POS	ST	#	DRIVER	SPONSOR / OWNER	CAR	LAPS	MONEY	STATUS	LED	PTS
1	3	9	Bill Elliott	Coors (Harry Melling)	Ford	200	55950	running	125	185
2	2	25	Tim Richmond	Folger's (Rick Hendrick)	Chevrolet	200	27980	running	5	175
3	4	11	Darrell Waltrip	Budweiser (Junior Johnson)	Chevrolet	200	27275	running	3	170
4	6	5	Geoffrey Bodine	Levi Garrett (Rick Hendrick)	Chevrolet	200	17225	running	21	165
5	12	3	Dale Earnhardt	Wrangler Jeans (Richard Childress)	Chevrolet	199	18750	running	34	160
6	7	27	Rusty Wallace	Alugard (Raymond Beadle)	Pontiac	199	12525	running	1	155
7	28	28	Cale Yarborough	Hardee's (Harry Ranier)	Ford	199	6815	running	0	146
8	5	33	Harry Gant	Skoal Bandit (Hal Needham)	Chevrolet	199	14815	running	0	142
9	9	66	Phil Parsons	Skoal (Leo Jackson / Richard Jackson)	Oldsmobile	199	5700	running	0	138
10	15	21	David Pearson	Chattanooga Chew (David Pearson)	Chevrolet	199	6605	running	0	134
11	17	90	Ken Schrader	Red Baron Frozen Pizza (Junie Donlavey)	Ford	199	11195	running	1	135
12	24	44	Terry Labonte	Piedmont Airlines (Billy Hagan)	Oldsmobile	198	11370	engine	0	127
13	11	8	Bobby Hillin Jr.	Miller American (Stavola Brothers)	Buick	198	8215	running	7	129
14	14	35	Alan Kulwicki	Quincy's Steak House (Alan Kulwicki)	Ford	198	4210	running	2	126
15	27	81	Chet Fillip	Circle Bar Truck Corral (Tom Mitchell)	Ford	197	3685	running	0	118
16	21	64	Eddie Bierschwale	Sunny King (Elmo Langley)	Ford	197	7735	running	0	115
17	33	77	Ken Ragan	McCord Gaskets (Marvin Ragan)	Chevrolet	196	2960	running	0	112
18	30	43	Richard Petty	STP (Petty Enterprises)	Pontiac	194	6705	engine	0	109
19	32	67	Buddy Arrington	Pannill Knitting (Buddy Arrington)	Ford	194	6375	running	0	106
20	36	6	D.K. Ulrich	U.S. Racing (D.K. Ulrich)	Chevrolet	193	6555	running	0	103
21	18	15	Ricky Rudd	Motorcraft (Bud Moore)	Ford	191	10195	running	0	100
22	37	85	Bobby Gerhart	Frederick (Bobby Gerhart / Billy Gerhart)	Chevrolet	191	2085	running	0	97
23	41	17	Jim Hull	Duraliner (Roger Hamby)	Oldsmobile	191	5390	running	0	94
24	8	22	Bobby Allison	Miller American (Stavola Brothers)	Buick	190	8865	running	0	91
25	39	52	Jimmy Means	Axe Equipment (Jimmy Means)	Pontiac	190	5065	running	0	88
26	1	55	Benny Parsons	Copenhagen (Leo Jackson / Richard Jackson)	Oldsmobile	185	4680	crash	1	90
27	35	51	David Simko	Mound Steel (Elmer Simko)	Chevrolet	170	1625	running	0	82
28	22	7	Kyle Petty	7-Eleven (Wood Brothers)	Ford	169	8570	crash	0	79
29	38	2	Rodney Combs	Solder Seal / Gunk (Robert Harrington)	Pontiac	150	1515	transmission	0	76
30	13	26	Joe Ruttman	Quaker State (Kenny Bernstein)	Buick	142	4505	engine	0	73
31	40	70	J.D. McDuffie	Winkle (J.D. McDuffie)	Pontiac	129	4190	engine	0	70
32	29	23	Michael Waltrip	Hawaiian Punch (Chuck Rider)	Pontiac	124	1370	running	0	67
33	20	08	Butch Miller	Classic (Leroy Throop)	Chevrolet	122	1325	camshaft	0	64
34	16	12	Neil Bonnett	Budweiser (Junior Johnson)	Chevrolet	115	9655	handling	0	61
35	34	71	Dave Marcis	Helen Rae Special (Dave Marcis)	Chevrolet	84	3990	ignition	0	58
36	19	47	Morgan Shepherd	Race Hill Farm (Jack Beebe)	Buick	80	1205	crash	0	55
37	31	75	Jim Sauter	Nationwise Auto Parts (Rahmoc Enterprises)	Pontiac	79	3955	transmission	0	52
38	26	10	Greg Sacks	TRW (DiGard Racing)	Chevrolet	60	1195	crash	0	49
39	25	18	Tommy Ellis	Freedlander Financial (Eric Freedlander)	Chevrolet	50	1190	engine	0	46
40	23	4	Rick Wilson	Kodak Film (Larry McClure)	Oldsmobile	37	1185	valve	0	43
41	10	88	Buddy Baker	Crisco (Buddy Baker / Danny Schiff)	Oldsmobile	27	1185	rear end	0	40
Failed to qualify
POS	NAME	NBR	SPONSOR	OWNER	CAR					
	Howard Mark	03	Deland Truck Centers	Howard Mark	Chevrolet					
	Dick Trickle	42	Matthews Racing	Billy Matthews	Chevrolet					
	Ronnie Thomas	48	Fleet Service	James Hylton	Chevrolet					
	Cliff Hucul	60		Bobby Eller	Pontiac					
	Joe Booher	68		Jerry Holden	Chevrolet					
	Gary Fedewa	80	Refrigeration Sales	Harold Burke	Chevrolet					

== Standings after the race ==
Pos	Driver	Points	Differential
1	Dale Earnhardt	2910	0
2	Darrell Waltrip	2769	-141
3	Tim Richmond	2755	-155
4	Bobby Allison	2545	-365
5	Ricky Rudd	2539	-371
6	Bill Elliott	2532	-378
7	Rusty Wallace	2448	-462
8 ▲	Geoffrey Bodine	2337	-573
9 ▼	Kyle Petty	2277	-633
10	Bobby Hillin Jr.	2267	-643

Preceded by 1986 The Budweiser At The Glen	NASCAR Winston Cup Series Season; 1986	Succeeded by 1986 Busch 500
