= 1986 Delaware 500 =

Auto race held at Dover International Speedway in 1986

Race details
- Race 23 of 29 in the 1986 NASCAR Winston Cup Series season
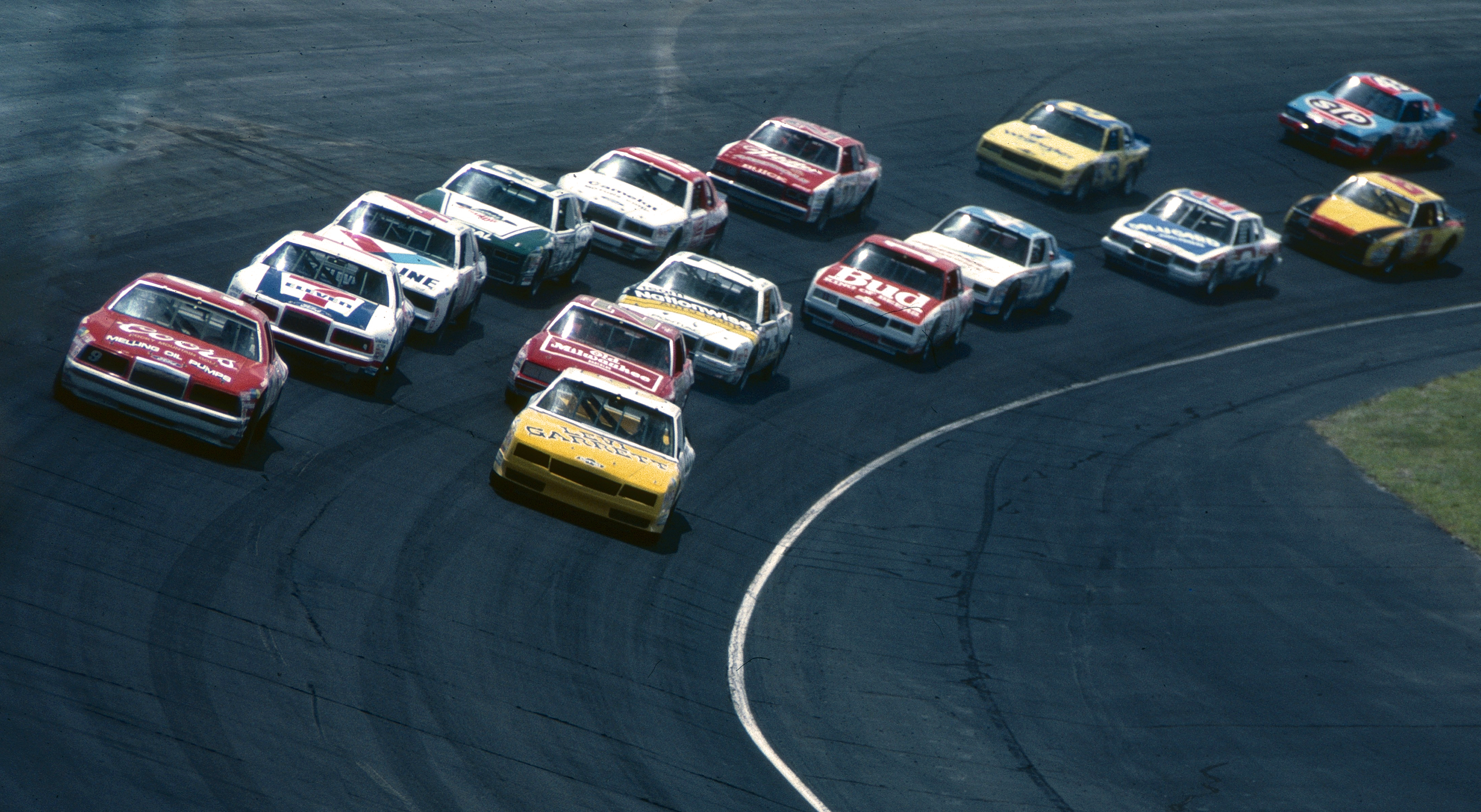
- Dover's then-current asphalt surface
- Date: September 14, 1986
- Official name: Delaware 500
- Location: Dover Downs International Speedway, Dover, Delaware
- Course: Permanent racing facility
- Course length: 1.000 miles (1.609 km)
- Distance: 500 laps, 500.0 mi (804.6 km)
- Weather: Temperatures reaching of 73.9 °F (23.3 °C); wind speeds of 9.9 miles per hour (15.9 km/h)
- Average speed: 114.329 mph (183.995 km/h)
- Attendance: 44,000

Pole position
Driver	Geoffrey Bodine	Hendrick Motorsports
- Time: 24.623 seconds

Most laps led
Driver	Ricky Rudd	Bud Moore Engineering
- Laps: 141

Winner
No. 15	Ricky Rudd	Bud Moore Engineering

Television in the United States
- Network: untelevised
- Announcers: none

The 1986 Delaware 500 was a NASCAR Winston Cup Series racing event that was held on September 14, 1986, at Dover Downs International Speedway in Dover, Delaware.

The most dominant drivers in the NASCAR Winston Cup Series during the 1980s were Bill Elliott, Darrell Waltrip, Terry Labonte, Bobby Allison, and Dale Earnhardt.

== Background ==
Dover Downs International Speedway, now called Dover International Speedway, is one of five short tracks to hold NASCAR races; the others are Bristol Motor Speedway, Richmond International Raceway, Martinsville Speedway, and Phoenix International Raceway. The NASCAR race makes use of the track's standard configuration, a four-turn short track oval that is 1 mile (1.6 km) long. The track's turns are banked at twenty-four degrees, and both the front stretch (the location of the finish line) and the backstretch are banked at nine degrees.

== Race report ==
There were 41 drivers who originally qualified for this race; only George Wiltshire failed to make the final 40-car starting grid. All but one of the drivers were born in the United States of America; Cliff Hucul was born in Canada.

This race lasted 500-laps or four hours and twenty-two minutes. Mike Potter was the first victim of engine failure on lap 22. Ricky Rudd finally gets a win on a big track, leading 141 laps en route to victory by defeating Neil Bonnet. Neil Bonnett scored his best result of the season so far in second, leading 12 laps. Buddy Baker scored his first of 5 straight top-5 finishes for the #88 team to close out the season, finishing a lap down in fourth. Alan Kulwicki recovered from an early crash and capitalized on attrition to finish in seventh, three laps off the pace. Bobby Hillin Jr. continued his methodical pace that had become custom throughout the season, finishing five laps down in ninth.

Morgan Shepherd had another strong run with the RahMoc #75, leading 36 laps but fading towards the end. He came home seven laps down in tenth. Richard Petty ran midpack much of the day, finishing seven laps down in twelfth. Rusty Wallace led 39 laps and ran with the leaders all day until a late crash knocked him out of contention. He would crawl home nine laps down in thirteenth. Darrell Waltrip struggled with mechanical issues all race, yet still finished ahead of his other title contenders in fourteenth, 10 laps off the pace. Buddy Arrington scored a second straight top-15 finish, coming home 16 laps down in fourteenth. Michael Waltrip never really recovered from an early spin, finishing sixteenth, 29 laps down.

Johnny Coy Jr. made his first start of the 1986 season in James Hylton's #48 entry. He was incredibly slow, finishing 31 laps down in seventeenth. This would ultimately be his best career finish. Joe Booher made his second start of the season in the #6 D.K. Ulrich entry. He was easily the slowest car on track, finishing 35 laps down in eighteenth. Dale Earnhardt was knocked out of contention by a late crash, finishing 68 laps down in twenty-first. He did manage to lead three laps, which was crucial in the points chase.

Rudd's Ford Thunderbird performed like a flawless machine from lap 200 to the checkered flag. Out of the 56 racing events that Ricky Rudd did at Dover International Speedway, his average start was 13th place while his average finish was 14th-place with four confirmed victories. Rudd was also proficient at the road courses in addition to Rockingham and Pocono.

Bobby Allison was stuck in the garage for many laps after an early crash, ultimately coming home 39 laps down in twentieth.

The pole position of the race would end up going to Geoffrey Bodine for travelling up to 146.205 miles per hour (235.294 km/h) during his solo qualifying runs. Tim Richmond ended up being the lowest-placed driver to actually make it through the race. Only Ricky Rudd, Neil Bonnett, and Kyle Petty would finish the race in the lead lap. Kyle Petty also surprised many with his strong third-place run; leading four laps in the process. Tommy Ellis turned in a solid run and finishes eighth, the second-best finish of his Cup career. This was his best run during his tenure in Eric Freedlander's #18 Freedlander Financial Chevrolet. ASA star Mark Martin made his third start of the 1986 season and scored his best finish in eleventh, 7 laps down.

Notable crew chiefs who actively participated in the race included Junie Donlavey, Robin Pemberton, Joey Arrington, Dale Inman, Larry McReynolds, Harry Hyde, Bud Moore, Kirk Shelmerdine among others.

Terry Labonte's led 85 laps and looked assured for a top-10 until a blown engine sidelined him after 461 laps. However, Labonte would have to earn this middle-of-the-road finish by dueling against Ricky Rudd for 138 laps. Bryan Baker, Roy Lee Hendrick, and Howard Rose would make their only appearances during this event. Cliff Hucul makes his second and final Cup series start and it results in the former USAC Champ Car racer's best finish with a 31st.

Winnings for this racing event varied from a then-awesome $51,500 ($151,264 when adjusted for inflation) to a humble $850 ($2,497 when adjusted for inflation). The total prize purse for this racing event totalled at exactly $314,000 ($922,268 when adjusted for inflation).

=== Qualifying ===
Grid	No.	Driver	Manufacturer	Speed	Qualifying time	Owner
1	5	Geoffrey Bodine	Chevrolet	146.205	24.623	Rick Hendrick
2	25	Tim Richmond	Chevrolet	144.904	24.844	Rick Hendrick
3	3	Dale Earnhardt	Chevrolet	144.075	24.987	Richard Childress
4	33	Harry Gant	Chevrolet	143.615	25.067	Hal Needham
5	4	Rick Wilson	Oldsmobile	143.192	25.141	Larry McClure
6	44	Terry Labonte	Oldsmobile	142.999	25.175	Billy Hagan
7	9	Bill Elliott	Ford	142.337	25.292	Harry Melling
8	27	Rusty Wallace	Pontiac	142.270	25.304	Raymond Beadle
9	75	Morgan Shepherd	Pontiac	142.225	25.312	RayMoc Enterprises
10	22	Bobby Allison	Buick	142.141	25.327	Stavola Brothers

== Top 20 finishers ==
Pos	No.	Driver	Manufacturer	Laps	Laps led	Time/Status
1	15	Ricky Rudd	Ford	500	141	4:22:24
2	12	Neil Bonnett	Chevrolet	500	12	+5.08 seconds
3	7	Kyle Petty	Ford	500	4	Lead lap under green flag
4	88	Buddy Baker	Oldsmobile	499	0	+1 laps
5	71	Dave Marcis	Chevrolet	498	9	+2 laps
6	26	Joe Ruttman	Buick	498	0	+2 laps
7	7	Alan Kulwicki	Ford	497	0	+3 laps
8	18	Tommy Ellis	Chevrolet	496	0	+4 laps
9	8	Bobby Hillin Jr.	Buick	495	0	+5 laps
10	75	Morgan Shepherd	Pontiac	493	36	+8 laps
11	02	Mark Martin	Ford	493	0	+8 laps
12	43	Richard Petty	Pontiac	493	0	+8 laps
13	27	Rusty Wallace	Pontiac	491	39	+9 laps
14	11	Darrell Waltrip	Chevrolet	490	0	+10 laps
15	67	Buddy Arrington	Ford	484	0	+16 laps
16	23	Michael Waltrip	Pontiac	471	0	+29 laps
17	48	Johnny Coy Jr.	Chevrolet	469	0	+31 laps
18	6	Joe Booher	Chevrolet	465	0	+35 laps
19	44	Terry Labonte	Oldsmobile	461	85	Engine failure
20	22	Bobby Allison	Buick	461	0	+39 laps

== Standings after the race ==
Pos	Driver	Points	Differential
1	Dale Earnhardt	3498	0
2	Tim Richmond	3360	-138
3	Darrell Waltrip	3306	-192
4	Bobby Allison	3112	-386
5 ▲	Ricky Rudd	3069	-429
6 ▼	Bill Elliott	3033	-465
7 ▲	Rusty Wallace	2903	-595
8 ▼	Geoffrey Bodine	2867	-631
9	Bobby Hillin Jr.	2823	-675
10	Terry Labonte	2757	-741

Preceded by 1986 Wrangler Jeans Indigo 400	NASCAR Winston Cup Series Season; 1986	Succeeded by 1986 Goody's 500
