= 2000 DieHard 500 =

Ninth race of the 2000 NASCAR Winston Cup Series

Race details
- Race 9 of 34 in the 2000 NASCAR Winston Cup Series
- The 2000 DieHard 500 program cover, featuring Dale Earnhardt.
- Date: April 16, 2000
- Official name: 31st Annual DieHard 500
- Location: Lincoln, Alabama, Talladega Superspeedway
- Course: Permanent racing facility
- Course length: 2.66 miles (4.28 km)
- Distance: 188 laps, 500.08 mi (804.8 km)
- Average speed: 161.157 miles per hour (259.357 km/h)
- Attendance: 185,000

Pole position
Driver	Jeremy Mayfield	Penske-Kranefuss Racing
- Time: 51.217

Most laps led
Driver	Mark Martin	Roush Racing
- Laps: 98

Winner
No. 24	Jeff Gordon	Hendrick Motorsports

Television in the United States
- Network: ABC
- Announcers: Bob Jenkins, Benny Parsons, Ray Evernham

Radio in the United States
- Radio: Motor Racing Network

The 2000 DieHard 500 was the ninth stock car race of the 2000 NASCAR Winston Cup Series and the 31st iteration of the event. The race was held on Sunday, April 16, 2000, before an audience of 185,000 in Lincoln, Alabama at Talladega Superspeedway, a 2.66 miles (4.28 km) permanent triangle-shaped superspeedway. The race took the scheduled 188 laps to complete. In a late race charge, Hendrick Motorsports' Jeff Gordon made a pass for the lead with five laps left in the race, defending the lead to take his 50th career NASCAR Winston Cup Series victory and his first victory of the season. To fill out the top three, Mike Skinner and Dale Earnhardt, both drivers from Richard Childress Racing, finished second and third, respectively.

== Background ==
The layout of Talladega Superspeedway, the venue where the race was held.

Talladega Superspeedway, originally known as Alabama International Motor Superspeedway (AIMS), is a motorsports complex located north of Talladega, Alabama. It is located on the former Anniston Air Force Base in the small city of Lincoln. The track is a tri-oval and was constructed in the 1960s by the International Speedway Corporation, a business controlled by the France family. Talladega is most known for its steep banking and the unique location of the start/finish line that's located just past the exit to pit road. The track currently hosts the NASCAR series such as the NASCAR Cup Series, Xfinity Series and the Camping World Truck Series. Talladega is the longest NASCAR oval with a length of 2.66-mile-long (4.28 km) tri-oval like the Daytona International Speedway, which also is a 2.5-mile-long (4 km) tri-oval.

=== Entry list ===
- (R) denotes rookie driver.

#	Driver	Team	Make
1	Steve Park	Dale Earnhardt, Inc.	Chevrolet
2	Rusty Wallace	Penske-Kranefuss Racing	Ford
3	Dale Earnhardt	Richard Childress Racing	Chevrolet
4	Bobby Hamilton	Morgan–McClure Motorsports	Chevrolet
5	Terry Labonte	Hendrick Motorsports	Chevrolet
6	Mark Martin	Roush Racing	Ford
7	Michael Waltrip	Mattei Motorsports	Chevrolet
8	Dale Earnhardt Jr. (R)	Dale Earnhardt, Inc.	Chevrolet
9	Stacy Compton (R)	Melling Racing	Ford
10	Johnny Benson Jr.	Tyler Jet Motorsports	Pontiac
11	Brett Bodine	Brett Bodine Racing	Ford
12	Jeremy Mayfield	Penske-Kranefuss Racing	Ford
13	Robby Gordon	Team Menard	Ford
14	Rick Mast	A. J. Foyt Enterprises	Pontiac
15	Ted Musgrave	Fenley-Moore Motorsports	Ford
16	Kevin Lepage	Roush Racing	Ford
17	Matt Kenseth (R)	Roush Racing	Ford
18	Bobby Labonte	Joe Gibbs Racing	Pontiac
20	Tony Stewart	Joe Gibbs Racing	Pontiac
21	Elliott Sadler	Wood Brothers Racing	Ford
22	Ward Burton	Bill Davis Racing	Pontiac
24	Jeff Gordon	Hendrick Motorsports	Chevrolet
25	Jerry Nadeau	Hendrick Motorsports	Chevrolet
26	Jimmy Spencer	Haas-Carter Motorsports	Ford
27	Mike Bliss (R)	Eel River Racing	Pontiac
28	Ricky Rudd	Robert Yates Racing	Ford
31	Mike Skinner	Richard Childress Racing	Chevrolet
32	Scott Pruett (R)	PPI Motorsports	Ford
33	Joe Nemechek	Andy Petree Racing	Chevrolet
36	Ken Schrader	MB2 Motorsports	Pontiac
40	Sterling Marlin	Team SABCO	Chevrolet
41	Gary Bradberry	Larry Hedrick Motorsports	Chevrolet
42	Kenny Irwin Jr.	Team SABCO	Chevrolet
43	John Andretti	Petty Enterprises	Pontiac
44	Kyle Petty	Petty Enterprises	Pontiac
50	Ricky Craven	Midwest Transit Racing	Chevrolet
55	Kenny Wallace	Andy Petree Racing	Chevrolet
60	Dick Trickle	Joe Bessey Racing	Chevrolet
66	Darrell Waltrip	Haas-Carter Motorsports	Ford
71	Dave Marcis	Marcis Auto Racing	Chevrolet
75	Wally Dallenbach Jr.	Galaxy Motorsports	Ford
77	Robert Pressley	Jasper Motorsports	Ford
88	Dale Jarrett	Robert Yates Racing	Ford
90	Ed Berrier (R)	Donlavey Racing	Ford
93	Dave Blaney (R)	Bill Davis Racing	Pontiac
94	Bill Elliott	Bill Elliott Racing	Ford
97	Chad Little	Roush Racing	Ford
99	Jeff Burton	Roush Racing	Ford
Official entry list

== Practice ==
=== First practice ===
The first practice session was held on Friday, April 14, at 12:15 PM EST. The session lasted for two hours. Roush Racing's Chad Little set the fastest time in the session, with a lap of 50.946 and an average speed of 187.964 mph (302.499 km/h).

Pos.	#	Driver	Team	Make	Time	Speed
1	97	Chad Little	Roush Racing	Ford	50.946	187.964
2	12	Jeremy Mayfield	Penske-Kranefuss Racing	Ford	51.167	187.152
3	2	Rusty Wallace	Penske-Kranefuss Racing	Ford	51.205	187.013
Full first practice results

=== Second practice ===
The second practice session was held on Saturday, April 15, at 9:15 AM EST. The session lasted for one hour and 15 minutes. Dale Earnhardt, Inc.'s Steve Park set the fastest time in the session, with a lap of 49.389 and an average speed of 193.889 mph (312.034 km/h).

Pos.	#	Driver	Team	Make	Time	Speed
1	1	Steve Park	Dale Earnhardt, Inc.	Chevrolet	49.389	193.889
2	25	Jerry Nadeau	Hendrick Motorsports	Chevrolet	49.399	193.850
3	77	Robert Pressley	Jasper Motorsports	Ford	49.414	193.791
Full second practice results

=== Final practice ===
The final practice session, sometimes referred to as Happy Hour, was held on Saturday, April 15, at 2:00 PM EST. The session lasted for one hour. Dale Earnhardt, Inc.'s Steve Park set the fastest time in the session, with a lap of 49.231 and an average speed of 194.512 mph (313.037 km/h).

Pos.	#	Driver	Team	Make	Time	Speed
1	26	Jimmy Spencer	Haas-Carter Motorsports	Ford	49.231	194.512
2	1	Steve Park	Dale Earnhardt, Inc.	Chevrolet	49.436	193.705
3	42	Kenny Irwin Jr.	Team SABCO	Chevrolet	49.475	193.552
Full Happy Hour practice results

== Qualifying ==
Qualifying was split into two rounds. The first round was meant to be held on Friday, April 14, at 4:00 PM EST, but due to threat of rain, was delayed to 7:30 PM, seeing several drivers qualify in dark conditions. The format for qualifying is each driver was given two laps to set a fastest time; the fastest of the two counted as their official qualifying lap. During the first round, the top 25 drivers in the round was guaranteed a starting spot in the race. If a driver was not able to guarantee a spot in the first round, they had the option to scrub their time from the first round and try and run a faster lap time in a second round qualifying run, held on Saturday, April 15, at 11:45 AM EST. As with the first round, each driver had two laps to set a fastest time; the fastest of the two would count as their official qualifying lap. Positions 26–36 was decided on time, while positions 37–43 was based on provisionals. Six spots were awarded by the use of provisionals based on owner's points. The seventh was awarded to a past champion who has not otherwise qualified for the race. If no past champion needs the provisional, the next team in the owner points was awarded a provisional.

Jeremy Mayfield, driving for Penske-Kranefuss Racing, managed to win the pole, setting a time of 51.217 and an average speed of 186.969 miles per hour (300.897 km/h) in the first round.

Five drivers failed to qualify - Brett Bodine, Kevin Lepage, Gary Bradberry, Rick Mast, & Elliott Sadler.

=== Full qualifying results ===
Pos.	#	Driver	Team	Make	Time	Speed
1	12	Jeremy Mayfield	Penske-Kranefuss Racing	Ford	51.217	186.969
2	94	Bill Elliott	Bill Elliott Racing	Ford	51.226	186.936
3	88	Dale Jarrett	Robert Yates Racing	Ford	51.278	186.747
4	3	Dale Earnhardt	Richard Childress Racing	Chevrolet	51.341	186.518
5	6	Mark Martin	Roush Racing	Ford	51.386	186.354
6	8	Dale Earnhardt Jr. (R)	Dale Earnhardt, Inc.	Chevrolet	51.436	186.173
7	40	Sterling Marlin	Team SABCO	Chevrolet	51.454	186.108
8	31	Mike Skinner	Richard Childress Racing	Chevrolet	51.473	186.039
9	22	Ward Burton	Bill Davis Racing	Pontiac	51.481	186.010
10	28	Ricky Rudd	Robert Yates Racing	Ford	51.490	185.978
11	7	Michael Waltrip	Mattei Motorsports	Chevrolet	51.497	185.953
12	42	Kenny Irwin Jr.	Team SABCO	Chevrolet	51.499	185.945
13	10	Johnny Benson Jr.	Tyler Jet Motorsports	Pontiac	51.519	185.873
14	97	Chad Little	Roush Racing	Ford	51.527	185.844
15	32	Scott Pruett (R)	PPI Motorsports	Ford	51.577	185.664
16	93	Dave Blaney (R)	Bill Davis Racing	Pontiac	51.583	185.643
17	2	Rusty Wallace	Penske-Kranefuss Racing	Ford	51.603	185.571
18	27	Mike Bliss (R)	Eel River Racing	Pontiac	51.603	185.571
19	77	Robert Pressley	Jasper Motorsports	Ford	51.638	185.445
20	26	Jimmy Spencer	Haas-Carter Motorsports	Ford	51.639	185.441
21	44	Kyle Petty	Petty Enterprises	Pontiac	51.647	185.413
22	9	Stacy Compton (R)	Melling Racing	Ford	51.655	185.384
23	90	Ed Berrier (R)	Donlavey Racing	Ford	51.671	185.326
24	33	Joe Nemechek	Andy Petree Racing	Chevrolet	51.734	185.101
25	43	John Andretti	Petty Enterprises	Pontiac	51.736	185.094
Failed to lock in the first round
26	55	Kenny Wallace	Andy Petree Racing	Chevrolet	51.666	185.344
27	71	Dave Marcis	Marcis Auto Racing	Chevrolet	51.742	185.072
28	4	Bobby Hamilton	Morgan–McClure Motorsports	Chevrolet	51.760	185.008
29	15	Ted Musgrave	Fenley-Moore Motorsports	Ford	51.832	184.751
30	25	Jerry Nadeau	Hendrick Motorsports	Chevrolet	51.865	184.633
31	60	Dick Trickle	Joe Bessey Racing	Chevrolet	51.890	184.544
32	50	Ricky Craven	Midwest Transit Racing	Chevrolet	51.902	184.502
33	5	Terry Labonte	Hendrick Motorsports	Chevrolet	51.927	184.413
34	13	Robby Gordon	Team Menard	Ford	51.976	184.239
35	75	Wally Dallenbach Jr.	Galaxy Motorsports	Ford	51.981	184.221
36	24	Jeff Gordon	Hendrick Motorsports	Chevrolet	52.005	184.136
Provisionals
37	18	Bobby Labonte	Joe Gibbs Racing	Pontiac	52.625	181.967
38	99	Jeff Burton	Roush Racing	Ford	-	-
39	20	Tony Stewart	Joe Gibbs Racing	Pontiac	52.325	183.010
40	36	Ken Schrader	MB2 Motorsports	Pontiac	52.055	183.959
41	1	Steve Park	Dale Earnhardt, Inc.	Chevrolet	52.111	183.762
42	17	Matt Kenseth (R)	Roush Racing	Ford	52.006	184.133
43	66	Darrell Waltrip	Haas-Carter Motorsports	Ford	52.456	182.553
Failed to qualify
44	11	Brett Bodine	Brett Bodine Racing	Ford	52.143	183.649
45	16	Kevin Lepage	Roush Racing	Ford	52.202	183.441
46	14	Rick Mast	A. J. Foyt Racing	Pontiac	52.233	183.332
47	21	Elliott Sadler	Wood Brothers Racing	Ford	52.603	182.043
48	41	Gary Bradberry	Larry Hedrick Motorsports	Chevrolet	53.003	180.669
Official first round qualifying results
Official starting lineup

== Race results ==
Fin	St	#	Driver	Team	Make	Laps	Led	Status	Pts	Winnings
1	36	24	Jeff Gordon	Hendrick Motorsports	Chevrolet	188	25	running	180	$159,755
2	8	31	Mike Skinner	Richard Childress Racing	Chevrolet	188	0	running	170	$115,680
3	4	3	Dale Earnhardt	Richard Childress Racing	Chevrolet	188	5	running	170	$92,630
4	12	42	Kenny Irwin Jr.	Team SABCO	Chevrolet	188	0	running	160	$86,280
5	20	26	Jimmy Spencer	Haas-Carter Motorsports	Ford	188	14	running	160	$76,665
6	5	6	Mark Martin	Roush Racing	Ford	188	98	running	160	$79,905
7	33	5	Terry Labonte	Hendrick Motorsports	Chevrolet	188	0	running	146	$69,450
8	7	40	Sterling Marlin	Team SABCO	Chevrolet	188	21	running	147	$59,930
9	21	44	Kyle Petty	Petty Enterprises	Pontiac	188	0	running	138	$57,580
10	9	22	Ward Burton	Bill Davis Racing	Pontiac	188	0	running	134	$72,480
11	25	43	John Andretti	Petty Enterprises	Pontiac	188	0	running	130	$60,375
12	38	99	Jeff Burton	Roush Racing	Ford	188	14	running	132	$65,445
13	13	10	Johnny Benson Jr.	Tyler Jet Motorsports	Pontiac	188	0	running	124	$44,465
14	1	12	Jeremy Mayfield	Penske-Kranefuss Racing	Ford	188	4	running	-25	$56,685
15	2	94	Bill Elliott	Bill Elliott Racing	Ford	188	0	running	118	$53,655
16	35	75	Wally Dallenbach Jr.	Galaxy Motorsports	Ford	188	0	running	115	$42,915
17	3	88	Dale Jarrett	Robert Yates Racing	Ford	187	4	running	117	$63,300
18	42	17	Matt Kenseth (R)	Roush Racing	Ford	187	2	running	114	$50,260
19	30	25	Jerry Nadeau	Hendrick Motorsports	Chevrolet	187	0	running	106	$48,870
20	15	32	Scott Pruett (R)	PPI Motorsports	Ford	187	0	running	103	$41,260
21	37	18	Bobby Labonte	Joe Gibbs Racing	Pontiac	187	0	running	100	$57,470
22	24	33	Joe Nemechek	Andy Petree Racing	Chevrolet	187	0	running	97	$47,950
23	19	77	Robert Pressley	Jasper Motorsports	Ford	186	0	running	94	$39,640
24	18	27	Mike Bliss (R)	Eel River Racing	Pontiac	186	0	running	91	$36,010
25	14	97	Chad Little	Roush Racing	Ford	185	0	running	88	$47,505
26	43	66	Darrell Waltrip	Haas-Carter Motorsports	Ford	185	0	running	85	$38,825
27	10	28	Ricky Rudd	Robert Yates Racing	Ford	182	0	running	82	$46,570
28	23	90	Ed Berrier (R)	Donlavey Racing	Ford	178	0	running	79	$35,315
29	32	50	Ricky Craven	Midwest Transit Racing	Chevrolet	173	0	engine	76	$35,160
30	16	93	Dave Blaney (R)	Bill Davis Racing	Pontiac	151	0	accident	73	$35,005
31	11	7	Michael Waltrip	Mattei Motorsports	Chevrolet	148	0	running	70	$46,350
32	41	1	Steve Park	Dale Earnhardt, Inc.	Chevrolet	145	0	running	67	$45,695
33	22	9	Stacy Compton (R)	Melling Racing	Ford	140	0	accident	64	$37,665
34	39	20	Tony Stewart	Joe Gibbs Racing	Pontiac	138	0	accident	61	$53,835
35	29	15	Ted Musgrave	Fenley-Moore Motorsports	Ford	137	0	accident	58	$34,305
36	40	36	Ken Schrader	MB2 Motorsports	Pontiac	137	0	accident	55	$34,175
37	34	13	Robby Gordon	Team Menard	Ford	136	0	accident	52	$34,015
38	27	71	Dave Marcis	Marcis Auto Racing	Chevrolet	136	0	accident	49	$33,675
39	31	60	Dick Trickle	Joe Bessey Racing	Chevrolet	135	0	accident	46	$41,475
40	26	55	Kenny Wallace	Andy Petree Racing	Chevrolet	130	0	engine	43	$41,750
41	17	2	Rusty Wallace	Penske-Kranefuss Racing	Ford	116	1	engine	45	$51,050
42	6	8	Dale Earnhardt Jr. (R)	Dale Earnhardt, Inc.	Chevrolet	113	0	engine	37	$42,850
43	28	4	Bobby Hamilton	Morgan–McClure Motorsports	Chevrolet	110	0	engine	34	$40,656
Official race results

== Media ==
=== Television ===
The race was aired live on ABC in the United States for the third and final time. Bob Jenkins, 1973 Cup Series champion Benny Parsons and former crew chief Ray Evernham called the race from the broadcast booth. Jerry Punch, Bill Weber and John Kernan handled pit road for the television side.

ABC
Booth announcers		Pit reporters
Lap-by-lap	Color-commentators	Pit reporters
Bob Jenkins	Benny Parsons; Ray Evernham	Jerry Punch; Bill Weber; John Kernan

== Standings after the race ==
Drivers' Championship standings

	Pos	Driver	Points
1	1	Mark Martin	1,370
1	2	Bobby Labonte	1,346 (−24)
	3	Ward Burton	1,293 (−77)
1	4	Dale Earnhardt	1,272 (−98)
1	5	Jeff Burton	1,236 (−134)
1	6	Dale Jarrett	1,167 (−203)
5	7	Jeff Gordon	1,149 (−221)
2	8	Rusty Wallace	1,129 (−241)
2	9	Terry Labonte	1,118 (−252)
2	10	Ricky Rudd	1,086 (−284)
Official driver's standings

- Note: Only the first 10 positions are included for the driver standings.

Previous race: 2000 Goody's Body Pain 500	NASCAR Winston Cup Series; 2000 season	Next race: 2000 NAPA Auto Parts 500
