= 2000 Goody's Body Pain 500 =

Eighth race of the 2000 NASCAR Winston Cup Series

Race details
- Race 8 of 34 in the 2000 NASCAR Winston Cup Series
- The 2000 Goody's Body Pain 500 program cover.
- Date: April 9, 2000
- Official name: 51st Annual Goody's Body Pain 500
- Location: Martinsville, Virginia, Martinsville Speedway
- Course: Permanent racing facility
- Course length: 0.526 miles (0.847 km)
- Distance: 500 laps, 263 mi (423.257 km)
- Average speed: 71.161 miles per hour (114.523 km/h)
- Attendance: 84,000

Pole position
Driver	Rusty Wallace	Penske-Kranefuss Racing
- Time: 19.969

Most laps led
Driver	Rusty Wallace	Penske-Kranefuss Racing
- Laps: 343

Winner
No. 6	Mark Martin	Roush Racing

Television in the United States
- Network: ESPN
- Announcers: Bob Jenkins, Ned Jarrett, Benny Parsons

Radio in the United States
- Radio: Motor Racing Network

The 2000 Goody's Body Pain 500 was the eighth stock car race of the 2000 NASCAR Winston Cup Series and the 51st iteration of the event. The race was held on Sunday, April 9, 2000, before an audience of 84,000 in Martinsville, Virginia at Martinsville Speedway, a 0.526 miles (0.847 km) permanent oval-shaped short track. The race took the scheduled 500 laps to complete. Gambling on pit strategy, Roush Racing's Mark Martin managed to defend the field on old tires, taking advantage of track position to take his 32nd career NASCAR Winston Cup Series victory and his only victory of the season. To fill out the top three, Roush Racing's Jeff Burton and Mattei Motorsports' Michael Waltrip finished second and third, respectively.

== Background ==
The layout of Martinsville Speedway, the venue where the race was held.

Martinsville Speedway is a NASCAR-owned stock car racing track located in Henry County, in Ridgeway, Virginia, just to the south of Martinsville. At 0.526 miles (0.847 km) in length, it is the shortest track in the NASCAR Cup Series. The track was also one of the first paved oval tracks in NASCAR, being built in 1947 by H. Clay Earles. It is also the only remaining race track that has been on the NASCAR circuit from its beginning in 1948.

=== Entry list ===
- (R) denotes rookie driver.

#	Driver	Team	Make
1	Steve Park	Dale Earnhardt, Inc.	Chevrolet
2	Rusty Wallace	Penske-Kranefuss Racing	Ford
3	Dale Earnhardt	Richard Childress Racing	Chevrolet
4	Bobby Hamilton	Morgan–McClure Motorsports	Chevrolet
5	Terry Labonte	Hendrick Motorsports	Chevrolet
6	Mark Martin	Roush Racing	Ford
7	Michael Waltrip	Mattei Motorsports	Chevrolet
8	Dale Earnhardt Jr. (R)	Dale Earnhardt, Inc.	Chevrolet
9	Stacy Compton (R)	Melling Racing	Ford
10	Johnny Benson Jr.	Tyler Jet Motorsports	Pontiac
11	Brett Bodine	Brett Bodine Racing	Ford
12	Jeremy Mayfield	Penske-Kranefuss Racing	Ford
13	Robby Gordon	Team Menard	Ford
14	Rick Mast	A. J. Foyt Enterprises	Pontiac
16	Kevin Lepage	Roush Racing	Ford
17	Matt Kenseth (R)	Roush Racing	Ford
18	Bobby Labonte	Joe Gibbs Racing	Pontiac
20	Tony Stewart	Joe Gibbs Racing	Pontiac
21	Elliott Sadler	Wood Brothers Racing	Ford
22	Ward Burton	Bill Davis Racing	Pontiac
24	Jeff Gordon	Hendrick Motorsports	Chevrolet
25	Jerry Nadeau	Hendrick Motorsports	Chevrolet
26	Jimmy Spencer	Haas-Carter Motorsports	Ford
27	Mike Bliss (R)	Eel River Racing	Pontiac
28	Ricky Rudd	Robert Yates Racing	Ford
31	Mike Skinner	Richard Childress Racing	Chevrolet
32	Scott Pruett (R)	PPI Motorsports	Ford
33	Joe Nemechek	Andy Petree Racing	Chevrolet
36	Ken Schrader	MB2 Motorsports	Pontiac
40	Sterling Marlin	Team SABCO	Chevrolet
41	Gary Bradberry	Larry Hedrick Motorsports	Chevrolet
42	Kenny Irwin Jr.	Team SABCO	Chevrolet
43	John Andretti	Petty Enterprises	Pontiac
44	Kyle Petty	Petty Enterprises	Pontiac
50	Ricky Craven	Midwest Transit Racing	Chevrolet
55	Kenny Wallace	Andy Petree Racing	Chevrolet
60	Rich Bickle	Joe Bessey Racing	Chevrolet
66	Darrell Waltrip	Haas-Carter Motorsports	Ford
71	Dave Marcis	Marcis Auto Racing	Chevrolet
75	Wally Dallenbach Jr.	Galaxy Motorsports	Ford
77	Robert Pressley	Jasper Motorsports	Ford
88	Dale Jarrett	Robert Yates Racing	Ford
90	Ed Berrier (R)	Donlavey Racing	Ford
93	Dave Blaney (R)	Bill Davis Racing	Pontiac
94	Bill Elliott	Bill Elliott Racing	Ford
97	Chad Little	Roush Racing	Ford
99	Jeff Burton	Roush Racing	Ford
Official race results

== Practice ==
Originally, three practice sessions were to be held, with one session on Friday and two sessions on Saturday. However, due to rain, the final session on Saturday was cancelled.

=== First practice ===
The first practice session was held on Friday, April 7, at 11:00 AM EST. The session lasted for two hours and 30 minutes. Robert Yates Racing's Ricky Rudd set the fastest time in the session, with a lap of 19.977 and an average speed of 94.789 mph (152.548 km/h).

Pos.	#	Driver	Team	Make	Time	Speed
1	28	Ricky Rudd	Robert Yates Racing	Ford	19.977	94.789
2	12	Jeremy Mayfield	Penske-Kranefuss Racing	Ford	20.014	94.614
3	11	Brett Bodine	Brett Bodine Racing	Ford	20.021	94.581
Full first practice results

=== Final practice ===
The final practice session was held on Saturday, April 8, at 10:00 AM EST. The session lasted for one hour and 45 minutes. Penske-Kranefuss Racing's Jeremy Mayfield set the fastest time in the session, with a lap of 20.210 and an average speed of 93.696 mph (150.789 km/h).

Pos.	#	Driver	Team	Make	Time	Speed
1	12	Jeremy Mayfield	Penske-Kranefuss Racing	Ford	20.210	93.696
2	7	Michael Waltrip	Mattei Motorsports	Chevrolet	20.221	93.645
3	55	Kenny Wallace	Andy Petree Racing	Chevrolet	20.246	93.530
Full final practice results

== Qualifying ==
Qualifying was split into two rounds. The first round was held on Friday, April 7, at 3:00 PM EST. Each driver had two laps to set a fastest time; the fastest of the two counted as their official qualifying lap. During the first round, the top 25 drivers in the round was guaranteed a starting spot in the race. If a driver was not able to guarantee a spot in the first round, they had the option to scrub their time from the first round and try and run a faster lap time in a second round qualifying run, held on Saturday, April 8, at 12:30 PM EST. As with the first round, each driver had two laps to set a fastest time; the fastest of the two would count as their official qualifying lap. Positions 26–36 was decided on time, while positions 37–43 was based on provisionals. Six spots were awarded by the use of provisionals based on owner's points. The seventh was awarded to a past champion who has not otherwise qualified for the race. If no past champion needs the provisional, the next team in the owner points was awarded a provisional.

Rusty Wallace, driving for Penske-Kranefuss Racing, managed to win the pole, setting a time of 19.969 and an average speed of 94.827 miles per hour (152.609 km/h) in the first round.

Four drivers failed to qualify.

=== Full qualifying results ===
Pos.	#	Driver	Team	Make	Time	Speed
1	2	Rusty Wallace	Penske-Kranefuss Racing	Ford	19.969	94.827
2	55	Kenny Wallace	Andy Petree Racing	Chevrolet	19.980	94.775
3	31	Mike Skinner	Richard Childress Racing	Chevrolet	19.986	94.746
4	11	Brett Bodine	Brett Bodine Racing	Ford	20.003	94.666
5	99	Jeff Burton	Roush Racing	Ford	20.005	94.656
6	25	Jerry Nadeau	Hendrick Motorsports	Chevrolet	20.005	94.656
7	28	Ricky Rudd	Robert Yates Racing	Ford	20.007	94.647
8	40	Sterling Marlin	Team SABCO	Chevrolet	20.043	94.477
9	94	Bill Elliott	Bill Elliott Racing	Ford	20.052	94.434
10	4	Bobby Hamilton	Morgan–McClure Motorsports	Chevrolet	20.068	94.359
11	24	Jeff Gordon	Hendrick Motorsports	Chevrolet	20.069	94.354
12	36	Ken Schrader	MB2 Motorsports	Pontiac	20.075	94.326
13	18	Bobby Labonte	Joe Gibbs Racing	Pontiac	20.085	94.279
14	50	Ricky Craven	Midwest Transit Racing	Chevrolet	20.086	94.275
15	9	Stacy Compton (R)	Melling Racing	Ford	20.089	94.261
16	44	Kyle Petty	Petty Enterprises	Pontiac	20.091	94.251
17	3	Dale Earnhardt	Richard Childress Racing	Chevrolet	20.101	94.204
18	22	Ward Burton	Bill Davis Racing	Pontiac	20.104	94.190
19	1	Steve Park	Dale Earnhardt, Inc.	Chevrolet	20.104	94.190
20	93	Dave Blaney (R)	Bill Davis Racing	Pontiac	20.104	94.190
21	6	Mark Martin	Roush Racing	Ford	20.105	94.186
22	8	Dale Earnhardt Jr. (R)	Dale Earnhardt, Inc.	Chevrolet	20.111	94.157
23	77	Robert Pressley	Jasper Motorsports	Ford	20.121	94.111
24	12	Jeremy Mayfield	Penske-Kranefuss Racing	Ford	20.123	94.101
25	10	Johnny Benson Jr.	Tyler Jet Motorsports	Pontiac	20.123	94.101
Failed to lock in the first round
26	43	John Andretti	Petty Enterprises	Pontiac	20.127	94.083
27	5	Terry Labonte	Hendrick Motorsports	Chevrolet	20.128	94.078
28	88	Dale Jarrett	Robert Yates Racing	Ford	20.147	93.989
29	33	Joe Nemechek	Andy Petree Racing	Chevrolet	20.165	93.905
30	60	Rich Bickle	Joe Bessey Racing	Chevrolet	20.169	93.887
31	17	Matt Kenseth (R)	Roush Racing	Ford	20.177	93.849
32	42	Kenny Irwin Jr.	Team SABCO	Chevrolet	20.182	93.826
33	27	Mike Bliss (R)	Eel River Racing	Pontiac	20.183	93.822
34	7	Michael Waltrip	Mattei Motorsports	Chevrolet	20.192	93.780
35	32	Scott Pruett (R)	PPI Motorsports	Ford	20.195	93.766
36	66	Darrell Waltrip	Haas-Carter Motorsports	Ford	20.227	93.617
Provisionals
37	20	Tony Stewart	Joe Gibbs Racing	Pontiac	20.241	93.553
38	97	Chad Little	Roush Racing	Ford	20.657	91.669
39	16	Kevin Lepage	Roush Racing	Ford	20.332	93.134
40	26	Jimmy Spencer	Haas-Carter Motorsports	Ford	20.254	93.493
41	21	Elliott Sadler	Wood Brothers Racing	Ford	20.586	91.985
42	13	Robby Gordon	Team Menard	Ford	-	-
43	41	Gary Bradberry	Larry Hedrick Motorsports	Chevrolet	20.650	91.700
Failed to qualify
44	75	Wally Dallenbach Jr.	Galaxy Motorsports	Ford	20.313	93.221
45	14	Rick Mast	A. J. Foyt Racing	Pontiac	20.345	93.074
46	71	Dave Marcis	Marcis Auto Racing	Chevrolet	20.360	93.006
47	90	Ed Berrier (R)	Donlavey Racing	Ford	20.505	92.348
Official first round qualifying results
Official starting lineup

== Race results ==
Fin	St	#	Driver	Team	Make	Laps	Led	Status	Pts	Winnings
1	21	6	Mark Martin	Roush Racing	Ford	500	64	running	180	$104,650
2	5	99	Jeff Burton	Roush Racing	Ford	500	0	running	170	$91,150
3	34	7	Michael Waltrip	Mattei Motorsports	Chevrolet	500	1	running	170	$79,850
4	11	24	Jeff Gordon	Hendrick Motorsports	Chevrolet	500	0	running	160	$65,530
5	28	88	Dale Jarrett	Robert Yates Racing	Ford	500	0	running	155	$65,125
6	37	20	Tony Stewart	Joe Gibbs Racing	Pontiac	500	0	running	150	$52,825
7	24	12	Jeremy Mayfield	Penske-Kranefuss Racing	Ford	500	0	running	146	$43,575
8	9	94	Bill Elliott	Bill Elliott Racing	Ford	500	0	running	142	$44,550
9	17	3	Dale Earnhardt	Richard Childress Racing	Chevrolet	500	42	running	143	$48,550
10	1	2	Rusty Wallace	Penske-Kranefuss Racing	Ford	500	343	running	144	$64,100
11	18	22	Ward Burton	Bill Davis Racing	Pontiac	500	8	running	135	$55,485
12	13	18	Bobby Labonte	Joe Gibbs Racing	Pontiac	500	9	running	132	$48,475
13	12	36	Ken Schrader	MB2 Motorsports	Pontiac	500	23	running	129	$31,650
14	26	43	John Andretti	Petty Enterprises	Pontiac	500	0	running	121	$46,050
15	23	77	Robert Pressley	Jasper Motorsports	Ford	499	0	running	118	$34,050
16	25	10	Johnny Benson Jr.	Tyler Jet Motorsports	Pontiac	499	0	running	115	$30,650
17	29	33	Joe Nemechek	Andy Petree Racing	Chevrolet	499	0	running	112	$38,850
18	10	4	Bobby Hamilton	Morgan–McClure Motorsports	Chevrolet	499	0	running	109	$37,625
19	3	31	Mike Skinner	Richard Childress Racing	Chevrolet	498	10	running	111	$38,225
20	6	25	Jerry Nadeau	Hendrick Motorsports	Chevrolet	498	0	running	103	$40,325
21	31	17	Matt Kenseth (R)	Roush Racing	Ford	498	0	running	100	$38,625
22	7	28	Ricky Rudd	Robert Yates Racing	Ford	497	0	running	97	$36,325
23	27	5	Terry Labonte	Hendrick Motorsports	Chevrolet	497	0	running	94	$42,625
24	8	40	Sterling Marlin	Team SABCO	Chevrolet	497	0	running	91	$35,825
25	19	1	Steve Park	Dale Earnhardt, Inc.	Chevrolet	497	0	running	88	$35,925
26	22	8	Dale Earnhardt Jr. (R)	Dale Earnhardt, Inc.	Chevrolet	496	0	running	85	$33,975
27	38	97	Chad Little	Roush Racing	Ford	496	0	running	82	$34,975
28	40	26	Jimmy Spencer	Haas-Carter Motorsports	Ford	494	0	running	79	$34,675
29	41	21	Elliott Sadler	Wood Brothers Racing	Ford	493	0	running	76	$35,275
30	30	60	Rich Bickle	Joe Bessey Racing	Chevrolet	492	0	running	73	$34,675
31	14	50	Ricky Craven	Midwest Transit Racing	Chevrolet	492	0	running	70	$22,975
32	35	32	Scott Pruett (R)	PPI Motorsports	Ford	492	0	running	67	$23,375
33	43	41	Gary Bradberry	Larry Hedrick Motorsports	Chevrolet	477	0	rear end	64	$25,075
34	39	16	Kevin Lepage	Roush Racing	Ford	469	0	running	61	$30,375
35	33	27	Mike Bliss (R)	Eel River Racing	Pontiac	464	0	running	58	$22,250
36	4	11	Brett Bodine	Brett Bodine Racing	Ford	454	0	running	55	$22,675
37	32	42	Kenny Irwin Jr.	Team SABCO	Chevrolet	447	0	running	52	$30,050
38	16	44	Kyle Petty	Petty Enterprises	Pontiac	441	0	accident	49	$29,925
39	15	9	Stacy Compton (R)	Melling Racing	Ford	439	0	engine	46	$21,800
40	42	13	Robby Gordon	Team Menard	Ford	424	0	rear end	43	$21,650
41	20	93	Dave Blaney (R)	Bill Davis Racing	Pontiac	400	0	accident	40	$21,525
42	2	55	Kenny Wallace	Andy Petree Racing	Chevrolet	296	0	running	37	$31,400
43	36	66	Darrell Waltrip	Haas-Carter Motorsports	Ford	146	0	transmission	34	$21,275
Failed to qualify
44		75	Wally Dallenbach Jr.	Galaxy Motorsports	Ford					
45		14	Rick Mast	A. J. Foyt Racing	Pontiac					
46		71	Dave Marcis	Marcis Auto Racing	Chevrolet					
47		90	Ed Berrier (R)	Donlavey Racing	Ford					
Official race results

== Standings after the race ==
Drivers' Championship standings

	Pos	Driver	Points
	1	Bobby Labonte	1,246
	2	Mark Martin	1,210 (−36)
	3	Ward Burton	1,159 (−87)
2	4	Jeff Burton	1,104 (−142)
1	5	Dale Earnhardt	1,102 (−144)
1	6	Rusty Wallace	1,084 (−162)
1	7	Dale Jarrett	1,050 (−196)
1	8	Ricky Rudd	1,004 (−242)
1	9	Jeremy Mayfield	994 (−252)
1	10	Tony Stewart	988 (−258)
Official driver's standings

- Note: Only the first 10 positions are included for the driver standings.

Previous race: 2000 DirecTV 500	NASCAR Winston Cup Series; 2000 season	Next race: 2000 DieHard 500
