= 2000 NAPA Auto Parts 500 =

Tenth race of the 2000 NASCAR Winston Cup Series

Race details
- Race 10 of 34 in the 2000 NASCAR Winston Cup Series
- The 2000 NAPA Auto Parts 500 program cover, featuring Jeff Gordon.
- Date: April 30, 2000
- Official name: Fourth Annual NAPA Auto Parts 500
- Location: Fontana, California, California Speedway
- Course: Permanent racing facility
- Course length: 2 miles (3.219 km)
- Distance: 250 laps, 500 mi (804.672 km)
- Average speed: 149.378 miles per hour (240.401 km/h)
- Attendance: 115,000

Pole position
Driver	Mike Skinner	Richard Childress Racing
- Time: 38.697

Most laps led
Driver	Matt Kenseth	Roush Racing
- Laps: 120

Winner
No. 12	Jeremy Mayfield	Penske-Kranefuss Racing

Television in the United States
- Network: ABC
- Announcers: Bob Jenkins, Benny Parsons, Ray Evernham

Radio in the United States
- Radio: Motor Racing Network

The 2000 NAPA Auto Parts 500 was the tenth stock car race of the 2000 NASCAR Winston Cup Series and the fourth iteration of the event. The race was held on Sunday, April 30, 2000, before an audience of 115,000 in Fontana, California, at the California Speedway, a two-mile (3.2 km) moderate-banked D-shaped speedway. The race took the scheduled 250 laps to complete. On the final restart with four laps left in the race, Penske-Kranefuss Racing's Jeremy Mayfield managed to defend the field to take the victory, overcoming an overheating car and a one lap deficit. The victory was Mayfield's second career NASCAR Winston Cup Series victory and his first victory of the season. To fill out the top three, Joe Gibbs Racing's Bobby Labonte and Roush Racing's Matt Kenseth finished second and third, respectively.

== Background ==
The layout of California Speedway, the venue where the race was held.

California Speedway is one of six superspeedways to hold NASCAR races; the others are Daytona International Speedway, Michigan International Speedway, Indianapolis Motor Speedway, Pocono Raceway and Talladega Superspeedway. The standard track at Auto Club Speedway is a four-turn superspeedway that is 2 miles (3.2 km) long. The track's turns are banked at fourteen degrees, while the front stretch, the location of the finish line, is banked at eleven degrees. The back stretch has 3 degrees of banking.

=== Entry list ===
- (R) denotes rookie driver.

#	Driver	Team	Make
1	Steve Park	Dale Earnhardt, Inc.	Chevrolet
2	Rusty Wallace	Penske-Kranefuss Racing	Ford
3	Dale Earnhardt	Richard Childress Racing	Chevrolet
4	Bobby Hamilton	Morgan–McClure Motorsports	Chevrolet
5	Terry Labonte	Hendrick Motorsports	Chevrolet
6	Mark Martin	Roush Racing	Ford
7	Michael Waltrip	Mattei Motorsports	Chevrolet
8	Dale Earnhardt Jr. (R)	Dale Earnhardt, Inc.	Chevrolet
9	Stacy Compton (R)	Melling Racing	Ford
10	Johnny Benson Jr.	Tyler Jet Motorsports	Pontiac
11	Brett Bodine	Brett Bodine Racing	Ford
12	Jeremy Mayfield	Penske-Kranefuss Racing	Ford
13	Robby Gordon	Team Menard	Ford
14	Rick Mast	A. J. Foyt Enterprises	Pontiac
16	Kevin Lepage	Roush Racing	Ford
17	Matt Kenseth (R)	Roush Racing	Ford
18	Bobby Labonte	Joe Gibbs Racing	Pontiac
20	Tony Stewart	Joe Gibbs Racing	Pontiac
21	Elliott Sadler	Wood Brothers Racing	Ford
22	Ward Burton	Bill Davis Racing	Pontiac
24	Jeff Gordon	Hendrick Motorsports	Chevrolet
25	Jerry Nadeau	Hendrick Motorsports	Chevrolet
26	Jimmy Spencer	Haas-Carter Motorsports	Ford
27	Mike Bliss (R)	Eel River Racing	Pontiac
28	Ricky Rudd	Robert Yates Racing	Ford
31	Mike Skinner	Richard Childress Racing	Chevrolet
32	Scott Pruett (R)	PPI Motorsports	Ford
33	Joe Nemechek	Andy Petree Racing	Chevrolet
36	Ken Schrader	MB2 Motorsports	Pontiac
40	Sterling Marlin	Team SABCO	Chevrolet
42	Kenny Irwin Jr.	Team SABCO	Chevrolet
43	John Andretti	Petty Enterprises	Pontiac
44	Kyle Petty	Petty Enterprises	Pontiac
55	Kenny Wallace	Andy Petree Racing	Chevrolet
60	Dick Trickle	Joe Bessey Racing	Chevrolet
66	Darrell Waltrip	Haas-Carter Motorsports	Ford
71	Dave Marcis	Marcis Auto Racing	Chevrolet
72	Dwayne Leik	Marcis Auto Racing	Chevrolet
75	Wally Dallenbach Jr.	Galaxy Motorsports	Ford
77	Robert Pressley	Jasper Motorsports	Ford
88	Dale Jarrett	Robert Yates Racing	Ford
90	Ed Berrier (R)	Donlavey Racing	Ford
93	Dave Blaney (R)	Bill Davis Racing	Pontiac
94	Bill Elliott	Bill Elliott Racing	Ford
97	Chad Little	Roush Racing	Ford
99	Jeff Burton	Roush Racing	Ford
Official entry list

== Practice ==
=== First practice ===
The first practice session was held on Friday, April 28, at 1:30 PM EST. The session lasted for two hours and 55 minutes. Dale Earnhardt, Inc.'s Steve Park set the fastest time in the session, with a lap of 38.584 and an average speed of 186.605 mph (300.312 km/h).

Pos.	#	Driver	Team	Make	Time	Speed
1	1	Steve Park	Dale Earnhardt, Inc.	Chevrolet	38.584	186.605
2	22	Ward Burton	Bill Davis Racing	Pontiac	38.668	186.200
3	77	Robert Pressley	Jasper Motorsports	Ford	38.720	185.950
Full first practice results

=== Second practice ===
The second practice session was held on Saturday, April 29, at 1:30 PM EST. The session lasted for one hour. Team Menard's Robby Gordon set the fastest time in the session, with a lap of 38.866 and an average speed of 185.252 mph (298.134 km/h).

Pos.	#	Driver	Team	Make	Time	Speed
1	13	Robby Gordon	Team Menard	Ford	38.866	185.252
2	33	Joe Nemechek	Andy Petree Racing	Chevrolet	39.031	184.469
3	42	Kenny Irwin Jr.	Team SABCO	Chevrolet	39.075	184.261
Full second practice results

=== Final practice ===
The final practice session, sometimes referred to as Happy Hour, was held on Saturday, April 29, after the preliminary 2000 Auto Club 300. The session lasted for one hour. Penske-Kranefuss Racing's Jeremy Mayfield set the fastest time in the session, with a lap of 39.960 and an average speed of 180.180 mph (289.972 km/h).

Pos.	#	Driver	Team	Make	Time	Speed
1	12	Jeremy Mayfield	Penske-Kranefuss Racing	Ford	39.960	180.180
2	8	Dale Earnhardt Jr. (R)	Dale Earnhardt, Inc.	Chevrolet	40.122	179.453
3	31	Mike Skinner	Richard Childress Racing	Chevrolet	40.155	179.305
Full Happy Hour practice results

== Qualifying ==
Qualifying was split into two rounds. The first round was held on Friday, April 14, at 4:00 PM EST. Each driver had two laps to set a fastest time; the fastest of the two counted as their official qualifying lap. During the first round, the top 25 drivers in the round was guaranteed a starting spot in the race. If a driver was not able to guarantee a spot in the first round, they had the option to scrub their time from the first round and try and run a faster lap time in a second round qualifying run, held on Saturday, April 15, at 11:45 AM EST. As with the first round, each driver had two laps to set a fastest time; the fastest of the two would count as their official qualifying lap. Positions 26–36 was decided on time, while positions 37–43 was based on provisionals. Six spots were awarded by the use of provisionals based on owner's points. The seventh was awarded to a past champion who has not otherwise qualified for the race. If no past champion needs the provisional, the next team in the owner points was awarded a provisional.

Mike Skinner, driving for Richard Childress Racing, managed to win the pole, setting a time of 38.697 and an average speed of 186.061 miles per hour (299.436 km/h) in the first round.

Three drivers failed to qualify.

=== Full qualifying results ===
Pos.	#	Driver	Team	Make	Time	Speed
1	31	Mike Skinner	Richard Childress Racing	Chevrolet	38.697	186.061
2	26	Jimmy Spencer	Haas-Carter Motorsports	Ford	38.714	185.979
3	28	Ricky Rudd	Robert Yates Racing	Ford	38.745	185.830
4	22	Ward Burton	Bill Davis Racing	Pontiac	38.779	185.668
5	6	Mark Martin	Roush Racing	Ford	38.817	185.486
6	32	Scott Pruett (R)	PPI Motorsports	Ford	38.876	185.204
7	66	Darrell Waltrip	Haas-Carter Motorsports	Ford	38.916	185.014
8	9	Stacy Compton (R)	Melling Racing	Ford	38.943	184.886
9	1	Steve Park	Dale Earnhardt, Inc.	Chevrolet	38.978	184.720
10	43	John Andretti	Petty Enterprises	Pontiac	38.987	184.677
11	2	Rusty Wallace	Penske-Kranefuss Racing	Ford	39.003	184.601
12	4	Bobby Hamilton	Morgan–McClure Motorsports	Chevrolet	39.003	184.601
13	99	Jeff Burton	Roush Racing	Ford	39.019	184.525
14	10	Johnny Benson Jr.	Tyler Jet Motorsports	Pontiac	39.033	184.459
15	14	Rick Mast	A. J. Foyt Racing	Pontiac	39.048	184.388
16	77	Robert Pressley	Jasper Motorsports	Ford	39.067	184.299
17	93	Dave Blaney (R)	Bill Davis Racing	Pontiac	39.085	184.214
18	36	Ken Schrader	MB2 Motorsports	Pontiac	39.119	184.054
19	21	Elliott Sadler	Wood Brothers Racing	Ford	39.128	184.011
20	8	Dale Earnhardt Jr. (R)	Dale Earnhardt, Inc.	Chevrolet	39.137	183.969
21	7	Michael Waltrip	Mattei Motorsports	Chevrolet	39.137	183.969
22	75	Wally Dallenbach Jr.	Galaxy Motorsports	Ford	39.142	183.946
23	17	Matt Kenseth (R)	Roush Racing	Ford	39.180	183.767
24	12	Jeremy Mayfield	Penske-Kranefuss Racing	Ford	39.234	183.514
25	25	Jerry Nadeau	Hendrick Motorsports	Chevrolet	39.263	183.379
Failed to lock in the first round
26	24	Jeff Gordon	Hendrick Motorsports	Chevrolet	39.269	183.351
27	94	Bill Elliott	Bill Elliott Racing	Ford	39.278	183.309
28	33	Joe Nemechek	Andy Petree Racing	Chevrolet	39.309	183.164
29	13	Robby Gordon	Team Menard	Ford	39.329	183.071
30	44	Kyle Petty	Petty Enterprises	Pontiac	39.332	183.057
31	11	Brett Bodine	Brett Bodine Racing	Ford	39.340	183.020
32	20	Tony Stewart	Joe Gibbs Racing	Pontiac	39.343	183.006
33	88	Dale Jarrett	Robert Yates Racing	Ford	39.348	182.983
34	5	Terry Labonte	Hendrick Motorsports	Chevrolet	39.402	182.732
35	3	Dale Earnhardt	Richard Childress Racing	Chevrolet	39.405	182.718
36	18	Bobby Labonte	Joe Gibbs Racing	Pontiac	39.418	182.658
Provisionals
37	40	Sterling Marlin	Team SABCO	Chevrolet	39.524	182.168
38	97	Chad Little	Roush Racing	Ford	40.266	178.811
39	42	Kenny Irwin Jr.	Team SABCO	Chevrolet	-	-
40	16	Kevin Lepage	Roush Racing	Ford	39.491	182.320
41	55	Kenny Wallace	Andy Petree Racing	Chevrolet	39.867	180.600
42	60	Dick Trickle	Joe Bessey Racing	Chevrolet	39.646	181.607
43	27	Mike Bliss (R)	Eel River Racing	Pontiac	39.533	182.126
Failed to qualify
44	71	Dave Marcis	Marcis Auto Racing	Chevrolet	39.662	181.534
45	90	Ed Berrier (R)	Donlavey Racing	Ford	40.389	178.266
46	72	Dwayne Leik	Marcis Auto Racing	Chevrolet	-	-
Official first round qualifying results
Official starting lineup

== Race results ==
Fin	St	#	Driver	Team	Make	Laps	Led	Status	Pts	Winnings
1	24	12	Jeremy Mayfield	Penske-Kranefuss Racing	Ford	250	26	running	180	$125,925
2	36	18	Bobby Labonte	Joe Gibbs Racing	Pontiac	250	0	running	170	$135,300
3	23	17	Matt Kenseth (R)	Roush Racing	Ford	250	120	running	175	$114,325
4	3	28	Ricky Rudd	Robert Yates Racing	Ford	250	10	running	165	$86,525
5	13	99	Jeff Burton	Roush Racing	Ford	250	2	running	160	$77,575
6	4	22	Ward Burton	Bill Davis Racing	Pontiac	250	0	running	150	$76,725
7	1	31	Mike Skinner	Richard Childress Racing	Chevrolet	250	64	running	151	$70,950
8	11	2	Rusty Wallace	Penske-Kranefuss Racing	Ford	250	0	running	142	$64,150
9	33	88	Dale Jarrett	Robert Yates Racing	Ford	250	0	running	138	$70,650
10	32	20	Tony Stewart	Joe Gibbs Racing	Pontiac	250	0	running	134	$75,950
11	26	24	Jeff Gordon	Hendrick Motorsports	Chevrolet	250	0	running	130	$64,475
12	20	8	Dale Earnhardt Jr. (R)	Dale Earnhardt, Inc.	Chevrolet	250	0	running	127	$52,375
13	25	25	Jerry Nadeau	Hendrick Motorsports	Chevrolet	250	0	running	124	$53,475
14	5	6	Mark Martin	Roush Racing	Ford	250	7	running	126	$58,175
15	38	97	Chad Little	Roush Racing	Ford	250	1	running	123	$59,275
16	9	1	Steve Park	Dale Earnhardt, Inc.	Chevrolet	250	2	running	120	$51,875
17	35	3	Dale Earnhardt	Richard Childress Racing	Chevrolet	250	0	running	112	$59,075
18	12	4	Bobby Hamilton	Morgan–McClure Motorsports	Chevrolet	250	0	running	109	$53,975
19	27	94	Bill Elliott	Bill Elliott Racing	Ford	250	1	running	111	$50,975
20	28	33	Joe Nemechek	Andy Petree Racing	Chevrolet	250	0	running	103	$55,775
21	16	77	Robert Pressley	Jasper Motorsports	Ford	249	1	running	105	$42,875
22	40	16	Kevin Lepage	Roush Racing	Ford	249	0	running	97	$50,075
23	14	10	Johnny Benson Jr.	Tyler Jet Motorsports	Pontiac	249	0	running	94	$41,775
24	18	36	Ken Schrader	MB2 Motorsports	Pontiac	249	2	running	96	$41,475
25	10	43	John Andretti	Petty Enterprises	Pontiac	249	6	running	93	$56,875
26	30	44	Kyle Petty	Petty Enterprises	Pontiac	249	0	running	85	$48,975
27	22	75	Wally Dallenbach Jr.	Galaxy Motorsports	Ford	249	0	running	82	$40,625
28	8	9	Stacy Compton (R)	Melling Racing	Ford	249	1	running	84	$41,225
29	7	66	Darrell Waltrip	Haas-Carter Motorsports	Ford	248	1	running	81	$40,125
30	21	7	Michael Waltrip	Mattei Motorsports	Chevrolet	248	0	running	73	$47,925
31	29	13	Robby Gordon	Team Menard	Ford	248	0	running	70	$36,750
32	37	40	Sterling Marlin	Team SABCO	Chevrolet	248	0	running	67	$44,550
33	34	5	Terry Labonte	Hendrick Motorsports	Chevrolet	247	0	running	64	$54,350
34	6	32	Scott Pruett (R)	PPI Motorsports	Ford	247	0	running	61	$36,750
35	43	27	Mike Bliss (R)	Eel River Racing	Pontiac	247	0	running	58	$35,975
36	41	55	Kenny Wallace	Andy Petree Racing	Chevrolet	246	0	running	55	$43,900
37	42	60	Dick Trickle	Joe Bessey Racing	Chevrolet	239	0	accident	52	$43,700
38	17	93	Dave Blaney (R)	Bill Davis Racing	Pontiac	236	0	running	49	$35,525
39	15	14	Rick Mast	A. J. Foyt Racing	Pontiac	220	0	running	46	$35,475
40	2	26	Jimmy Spencer	Haas-Carter Motorsports	Ford	219	6	accident	48	$43,400
41	31	11	Brett Bodine	Brett Bodine Racing	Ford	187	0	running	40	$35,350
42	39	42	Kenny Irwin Jr.	Team SABCO	Chevrolet	99	0	accident	37	$43,300
43	19	21	Elliott Sadler	Wood Brothers Racing	Ford	94	0	engine	34	$43,250
Official race results

== Media ==
=== Television ===
The race was aired live on ABC in the United States for the twenty ninth and final time Bob Jenkins, 1973 Cup Series champion Benny Parsons and two-time NAPA Auto Parts 500 winning crew chief Ray Evernham called the race from the broadcast booth. Jerry Punch, Bill Weber and John Kernan handled pit road for the television side.

ABC
Booth announcers		Pit reporters
Lap-by-lap	Color-commentators	Pit reporters
Bob Jenkins	Benny Parsons; Ray Evernham	Jerry Punch; Bill Weber; John Kernan

== Standings after the race ==
Drivers' Championship standings

	Pos	Driver	Points
1	1	Bobby Labonte	1,516
1	2	Mark Martin	1,496 (−20)
	3	Ward Burton	1,443 (−73)
1	4	Jeff Burton	1,396 (−120)
1	5	Dale Earnhardt	1,384 (−132)
	6	Dale Jarrett	1,305 (−211)
	7	Jeff Gordon	1,279 (−237)
	8	Rusty Wallace	1,271 (−245)
1	9	Ricky Rudd	1,251 (−265)
4	10	Mike Skinner	1,194 (−322)
Official driver's standings

- Note: Only the first 10 positions are included for the driver standings.

Previous race: 2000 DieHard 500	NASCAR Winston Cup Series; 2000 season	Next race: 2000 Pontiac Excitement 400
