= 2000 Pontiac Excitement 400 =

11th race of the 2000 NASCAR Winston Cup Series

Race details
- Race 11 of 34 in the 2000 NASCAR Winston Cup Series
- The 2000 Pontiac Excitement 400 program cover, with artwork by Garry Hill.
- Date: May 6, 2000
- Official name: 46th Annual Pontiac Excitement 400
- Location: Richmond, Virginia, Richmond International Raceway
- Course: Permanent racing facility
- Course length: 0.75 miles (1.21 km)
- Distance: 400 laps, 300 mi (482.803 km)
- Scheduled distance: 400 laps, 300 mi (482.803 km)
- Average speed: 99.374 miles per hour (159.927 km/h)

Pole position
Driver	Rusty Wallace	Penske-Kranefuss Racing
- Time: 21.645

Most laps led
Driver	Rusty Wallace	Penske-Kranefuss Racing
- Laps: 227

Winner
No. 8	Dale Earnhardt Jr.	Dale Earnhardt, Inc.

Television in the United States
- Network: ESPN
- Announcers: Bob Jenkins, Benny Parsons, Ned Jarrett

Radio in the United States
- Radio: Motor Racing Network

The 2000 Pontiac Excitement 400 was the 11th stock car race of the 2000 NASCAR Winston Cup Series and the 46th iteration of the event. The race was held on Saturday, May 6, 2000, in Richmond, Virginia, at Richmond International Raceway, a 0.75 miles (1.21 km) D-shaped oval. The race took the scheduled 400 laps to complete. At race's end, Dale Earnhardt Jr., driving for Dale Earnhardt, Inc., would hold onto the lead after making a four-tire call on the final round of pit stops to win his second career NASCAR Winston Cup Series win and his second and final win of the season. To fill out the podium, Terry Labonte of Hendrick Motorsports and Dale Jarrett of Robert Yates Racing would finish second and third, respectively.

== Background ==
The layout of Richmond International Raceway, the venue where the race was at.

Richmond International Raceway (RIR) is a 3/4-mile (1.2 km), D-shaped, asphalt race track located just outside Richmond, Virginia in Henrico County. It hosts the Monster Energy NASCAR Cup Series and Xfinity Series. Known as "America's premier short track", it formerly hosted a NASCAR Camping World Truck Series race, an IndyCar Series race, and two USAC sprint car races.

=== Entry list ===
- (R) denotes rookie driver.

#	Driver	Team	Make
1	Steve Park	Dale Earnhardt, Inc.	Chevrolet
2	Rusty Wallace	Penske-Kranefuss Racing	Ford
3	Dale Earnhardt	Richard Childress Racing	Chevrolet
4	Bobby Hamilton	Morgan–McClure Motorsports	Chevrolet
5	Terry Labonte	Hendrick Motorsports	Chevrolet
6	Mark Martin	Roush Racing	Ford
7	Michael Waltrip	Mattei Motorsports	Chevrolet
8	Dale Earnhardt Jr. (R)	Dale Earnhardt, Inc.	Chevrolet
9	Stacy Compton (R)	Melling Racing	Ford
10	Johnny Benson Jr.	Tyler Jet Motorsports	Pontiac
11	Brett Bodine	Brett Bodine Racing	Ford
12	Jeremy Mayfield	Penske-Kranefuss Racing	Ford
13	Robby Gordon	Team Menard	Ford
14	Rick Mast	A. J. Foyt Enterprises	Pontiac
16	Kevin Lepage	Roush Racing	Ford
17	Matt Kenseth (R)	Roush Racing	Ford
18	Bobby Labonte	Joe Gibbs Racing	Pontiac
20	Tony Stewart	Joe Gibbs Racing	Pontiac
21	Elliott Sadler	Wood Brothers Racing	Ford
22	Ward Burton	Bill Davis Racing	Pontiac
24	Jeff Gordon	Hendrick Motorsports	Chevrolet
25	Jerry Nadeau	Hendrick Motorsports	Chevrolet
26	Jimmy Spencer	Haas-Carter Motorsports	Ford
27	Mike Bliss (R)	Eel River Racing	Pontiac
28	Ricky Rudd	Robert Yates Racing	Ford
31	Mike Skinner	Richard Childress Racing	Chevrolet
32	Scott Pruett (R)	PPI Motorsports	Ford
33	Joe Nemechek	Andy Petree Racing	Chevrolet
36	Ken Schrader	MB2 Motorsports	Pontiac
40	Sterling Marlin	Team SABCO	Chevrolet
42	Kenny Irwin Jr.	Team SABCO	Chevrolet
43	John Andretti	Petty Enterprises	Pontiac
44	Kyle Petty	Petty Enterprises	Pontiac
50	Ricky Craven	Midwest Transit Racing	Chevrolet
55	Kenny Wallace	Andy Petree Racing	Chevrolet
60	Geoff Bodine	Joe Bessey Racing	Chevrolet
66	Darrell Waltrip	Haas-Carter Motorsports	Ford
71	Dave Marcis	Marcis Auto Racing	Chevrolet
75	Wally Dallenbach Jr.	Galaxy Motorsports	Ford
77	Robert Pressley	Jasper Motorsports	Ford
88	Dale Jarrett	Robert Yates Racing	Ford
90	Ed Berrier (R)	Donlavey Racing	Ford
91	Todd Bodine	LJ Racing	Chevrolet
93	Dave Blaney (R)	Bill Davis Racing	Pontiac
94	Bill Elliott	Bill Elliott Racing	Ford
97	Chad Little	Roush Racing	Ford
99	Jeff Burton	Roush Racing	Ford
Official entry list

== Practice ==
=== First practice ===
The first practice session was held on Friday, May 5, at 12:30 PM EST, and would last for one hour and 25 minutes. Steve Park of Dale Earnhardt, Inc. would set the fastest time in the session, with a lap of 21.753 and an average speed of 124.120 mph (199.752 km/h).

Pos.	#	Driver	Team	Make	Time	Speed
1	1	Steve Park	Dale Earnhardt, Inc.	Chevrolet	21.753	124.120
2	2	Rusty Wallace	Penske-Kranefuss Racing	Ford	21.797	123.870
3	55	Kenny Wallace	Andy Petree Racing	Chevrolet	21.805	123.824
Full first practice results

=== Second practice ===
The second practice session was held on Friday, May 5, at 3:00 PM EST, and would last for one hour and 30 minutes. Ricky Rudd of Robert Yates Racing would set the fastest time in the session, with a lap of 21.751 and an average speed of 124.132 mph (199.771 km/h).

Pos.	#	Driver	Team	Make	Time	Speed
1	28	Ricky Rudd	Robert Yates Racing	Ford	21.751	124.132
2	31	Mike Skinner	Richard Childress Racing	Chevrolet	21.786	123.932
3	20	Tony Stewart	Joe Gibbs Racing	Pontiac	21.834	123.660
Full second practice results

=== Third practice ===
The third practice session was held on Saturday, May 6, at 11:30 AM EST, and would last for one hour. Kyle Petty of Petty Enterprises would set the fastest time in the session, with a lap of 22.193 and an average speed of 121.659 mph (195.791 km/h).

Pos.	#	Driver	Team	Make	Time	Speed
1	44	Kyle Petty	Petty Enterprises	Pontiac	22.193	121.659
2	14	Rick Mast	A. J. Foyt Enterprises	Pontiac	22.323	120.951
3	91	Todd Bodine	LJ Racing	Chevrolet	22.339	120.864
Full third practice results

=== Fourth and final practice ===
The fourth and final practice session, sometimes referred to as Happy Hour, was held on Saturday, May 6 after second-round qualifying, and lasted until 3:00 PM EST. Todd Bodine of LJ Racing would set the fastest time in the session, with a lap of 22.224 and an average speed of 121.490 mph (195.519 km/h).

Pos.	#	Driver	Team	Make	Time	Speed
1	91	Todd Bodine	LJ Racing	Chevrolet	22.224	121.490
2	25	Jerry Nadeau	Hendrick Motorsports	Chevrolet	22.234	121.435
3	16	Kevin Lepage	Roush Racing	Ford	22.293	121.114
Full Happy Hour practice results

== Qualifying ==
Qualifying was split into two rounds. The first round was held on Friday, May 5, at 5:30 PM EST. Each driver would have two laps to set a fastest time; the fastest of the two would count as their official qualifying lap. During the first round, the top 25 drivers in the round would be guaranteed a starting spot in the race. If a driver was not able to guarantee a spot in the first round, they had the option to scrub their time from the first round and try and run a faster lap time in a second round qualifying run, held on Saturday, May 6, at 1:45 PM EST. As with the first round, each driver would have two laps to set a fastest time; the fastest of the two would count as their official qualifying lap. Positions 26-36 would be decided on time, while positions 37-43 would be based on provisionals. Six spots are awarded by the use of provisionals based on owner's points. The seventh is awarded to a past champion who has not otherwise qualified for the race. If no past champion needs the provisional, the next team in the owner points will be awarded a provisional.

Rusty Wallace of Penske-Kranefuss Racing would win the pole, setting a time of 21.645 and an average speed of 124.740 miles per hour (200.750 km/h).

Four drivers would fail to qualify: Rick Mast, Darrell Waltrip, Dave Marcis, and Ed Berrier.

=== Full qualifying results ===
Pos.	#	Driver	Team	Make	Time	Speed
1	2	Rusty Wallace	Penske-Kranefuss Racing	Ford	21.645	124.740
2	1	Steve Park	Dale Earnhardt, Inc.	Chevrolet	21.687	124.499
3	31	Mike Skinner	Richard Childress Racing	Chevrolet	21.688	124.493
4	60	Geoff Bodine	Joe Bessey Racing	Chevrolet	21.746	124.161
5	8	Dale Earnhardt Jr. (R)	Dale Earnhardt, Inc.	Chevrolet	21.776	123.990
6	28	Ricky Rudd	Robert Yates Racing	Ford	21.782	123.956
7	20	Tony Stewart	Joe Gibbs Racing	Pontiac	21.799	123.859
8	75	Wally Dallenbach Jr.	Galaxy Motorsports	Ford	21.820	123.740
9	18	Bobby Labonte	Joe Gibbs Racing	Pontiac	21.825	123.711
10	94	Bill Elliott	Bill Elliott Racing	Ford	21.838	123.638
11	6	Mark Martin	Roush Racing	Ford	21.861	123.508
12	43	John Andretti	Petty Enterprises	Pontiac	21.863	123.496
13	22	Ward Burton	Bill Davis Racing	Pontiac	21.869	123.462
14	50	Ricky Craven	Midwest Transit Racing	Chevrolet	21.888	123.355
15	24	Jeff Gordon	Hendrick Motorsports	Chevrolet	21.903	123.271
16	55	Kenny Wallace	Andy Petree Racing	Chevrolet	21.905	123.260
17	33	Joe Nemechek	Andy Petree Racing	Chevrolet	21.912	123.220
18	88	Dale Jarrett	Robert Yates Racing	Ford	21.917	123.192
19	9	Stacy Compton (R)	Melling Racing	Ford	21.918	123.186
20	12	Jeremy Mayfield	Penske-Kranefuss Racing	Ford	21.921	123.170
21	40	Sterling Marlin	Team SABCO	Chevrolet	21.930	123.119
22	26	Jimmy Spencer	Haas-Carter Motorsports	Ford	21.936	123.085
23	10	Johnny Benson Jr.	Tyler Jet Motorsports	Pontiac	21.949	123.012
24	4	Bobby Hamilton	Morgan–McClure Motorsports	Chevrolet	21.952	122.996
25	42	Kenny Irwin Jr.	Team SABCO	Chevrolet	21.986	122.805
26	97	Chad Little	Roush Racing	Ford	21.990	122.783
27	77	Robert Pressley	Jasper Motorsports	Ford	22.001	122.722
28	11	Brett Bodine	Brett Bodine Racing	Ford	22.005	122.699
29	99	Jeff Burton	Roush Racing	Ford	22.012	122.660
30	5	Terry Labonte	Hendrick Motorsports	Chevrolet	22.030	122.560
31	3	Dale Earnhardt	Richard Childress Racing	Chevrolet	22.031	122.555
32	93	Dave Blaney (R)	Bill Davis Racing	Pontiac	22.033	122.543
33	91	Todd Bodine	LJ Racing	Chevrolet	22.037	122.521
34	36	Ken Schrader	MB2 Motorsports	Pontiac	22.060	122.393
35	32	Scott Pruett (R)	PPI Motorsports	Ford	22.077	122.299
36	13	Robby Gordon	Team Menard	Ford	22.079	122.288
Provisionals
37	17	Matt Kenseth (R)	Roush Racing	Ford	22.204	121.600
38	7	Michael Waltrip	Mattei Motorsports	Chevrolet	1:43.167	26.171
39	16	Kevin Lepage	Roush Racing	Ford	22.277	121.201
40	25	Jerry Nadeau	Hendrick Motorsports	Chevrolet	22.080	122.283
41	44	Kyle Petty	Petty Enterprises	Pontiac	22.232	121.447
42	21	Elliott Sadler	Wood Brothers Racing	Ford	22.191	121.671
43	27	Mike Bliss (R)	Eel River Racing	Pontiac	22.114	122.095
Failed to qualify
44	14	Rick Mast	A. J. Foyt Enterprises	Pontiac	22.162	121.830
45	66	Darrell Waltrip	Haas-Carter Motorsports	Ford	22.250	121.348
46	71	Dave Marcis	Marcis Auto Racing	Chevrolet	22.281	121.179
47	90	Ed Berrier (R)	Donlavey Racing	Ford	22.288	121.141
Official qualifying results

== Race results ==
Fin	St	#	Driver	Team	Make	Laps	Led	Status	Pts	Winnings
1	5	8	Dale Earnhardt Jr. (R)	Dale Earnhardt, Inc.	Chevrolet	400	31	running	180	$118,850
2	30	5	Terry Labonte	Hendrick Motorsports	Chevrolet	400	27	running	175	$85,925
3	18	88	Dale Jarrett	Robert Yates Racing	Ford	400	0	running	165	$78,525
4	6	28	Ricky Rudd	Robert Yates Racing	Ford	400	0	running	160	$63,025
5	1	2	Rusty Wallace	Penske-Kranefuss Racing	Ford	400	227	running	165	$68,625
6	13	22	Ward Burton	Bill Davis Racing	Pontiac	400	12	running	155	$57,775
7	29	99	Jeff Burton	Roush Racing	Ford	400	0	running	146	$51,900
8	7	20	Tony Stewart	Joe Gibbs Racing	Pontiac	400	69	running	147	$49,350
9	10	94	Bill Elliott	Bill Elliott Racing	Ford	400	0	running	138	$42,450
10	31	3	Dale Earnhardt	Richard Childress Racing	Chevrolet	400	19	running	139	$52,800
11	2	1	Steve Park	Dale Earnhardt, Inc.	Chevrolet	400	0	running	130	$41,050
12	34	36	Ken Schrader	MB2 Motorsports	Pontiac	400	0	running	127	$41,525
13	4	60	Geoff Bodine	Joe Bessey Racing	Chevrolet	400	0	running	124	$41,750
14	15	24	Jeff Gordon	Hendrick Motorsports	Chevrolet	400	0	running	121	$46,850
15	37	17	Matt Kenseth (R)	Roush Racing	Ford	400	0	running	118	$41,660
16	8	75	Wally Dallenbach Jr.	Galaxy Motorsports	Ford	400	0	running	115	$30,275
17	22	26	Jimmy Spencer	Haas-Carter Motorsports	Ford	400	0	running	112	$38,675
18	12	43	John Andretti	Petty Enterprises	Pontiac	400	0	running	109	$43,825
19	38	7	Michael Waltrip	Mattei Motorsports	Chevrolet	400	0	running	106	$37,000
20	16	55	Kenny Wallace	Andy Petree Racing	Chevrolet	400	0	running	103	$41,575
21	39	16	Kevin Lepage	Roush Racing	Ford	400	0	running	100	$37,025
22	19	9	Stacy Compton (R)	Melling Racing	Ford	400	0	running	97	$28,900
23	17	33	Joe Nemechek	Andy Petree Racing	Chevrolet	399	0	running	94	$36,000
24	42	21	Elliott Sadler	Wood Brothers Racing	Ford	398	1	running	96	$35,775
25	23	10	Johnny Benson Jr.	Tyler Jet Motorsports	Pontiac	398	0	running	88	$27,925
26	9	18	Bobby Labonte	Joe Gibbs Racing	Pontiac	396	0	running	85	$44,000
27	35	32	Scott Pruett (R)	PPI Motorsports	Ford	392	0	running	82	$24,075
28	41	44	Kyle Petty	Petty Enterprises	Pontiac	390	0	running	79	$35,050
29	21	40	Sterling Marlin	Team SABCO	Chevrolet	389	0	running	76	$34,825
30	40	25	Jerry Nadeau	Hendrick Motorsports	Chevrolet	389	0	running	73	$34,700
31	24	4	Bobby Hamilton	Morgan–McClure Motorsports	Chevrolet	372	0	rear end	70	$34,650
32	11	6	Mark Martin	Roush Racing	Ford	362	3	crash	72	$41,600
33	3	31	Mike Skinner	Richard Childress Racing	Chevrolet	354	10	running	69	$31,550
34	32	93	Dave Blaney (R)	Bill Davis Racing	Pontiac	339	0	running	61	$23,500
35	27	77	Robert Pressley	Jasper Motorsports	Ford	327	0	running	58	$23,450
36	20	12	Jeremy Mayfield	Penske-Kranefuss Racing	Ford	323	0	running	55	$31,400
37	36	13	Robby Gordon	Team Menard	Ford	282	0	brakes	52	$23,350
38	28	11	Brett Bodine	Brett Bodine Racing	Ford	280	0	engine	49	$23,300
39	26	97	Chad Little	Roush Racing	Ford	273	1	crash	51	$31,225
40	14	50	Ricky Craven	Midwest Transit Racing	Chevrolet	239	0	crash	43	$23,150
41	43	27	Mike Bliss (R)	Eel River Racing	Pontiac	170	0	crash	40	$23,100
42	25	42	Kenny Irwin Jr.	Team SABCO	Chevrolet	170	0	crash	37	$31,055
43	33	91	Todd Bodine	LJ Racing	Chevrolet	42	0	crash	34	$23,000
Official race results

== Standings after the race ==
Drivers' Championship standings

	Pos	Driver	Points
	1	Bobby Labonte	1,601
1	2	Ward Burton	1,598 (−3)
1	3	Mark Martin	1,568 (−33)
	4	Jeff Burton	1,542 (−59)
	5	Dale Earnhardt	1,523 (−78)
	6	Dale Jarrett	1,470 (−131)
1	7	Rusty Wallace	1,436 (−165)
1	8	Ricky Rudd	1,411 (−190)
2	9	Jeff Gordon	1,400 (−201)
3	10	Terry Labonte	1,357 (−244)
Official driver's standings

- Note: Only the first 10 positions are included for the driver standings.

Previous race: 2000 NAPA Auto Parts 500	NASCAR Winston Cup Series; 2000 season	Next race: 2000 Coca-Cola 600
