= 1986 Daytona 500 =

First race of the 1986 NASCAR Winston Cup Series

Race details
- Race 1 of 29 in the 1986 NASCAR Winston Cup Series
- The 1986 Daytona 500 program cover, featuring Bill Elliott.
- Date: February 16, 1986
- Official name: 28th Annual Daytona 500
- Location: Daytona Beach, Florida, Daytona International Speedway
- Course: Permanent racing facility
- Course length: 2.5 miles (4.0 km)
- Distance: 200 laps, 500 mi (804.672 km)
- Average speed: 148.124 miles per hour (238.382 km/h)
- Attendance: 125,000

Pole position
Driver	Bill Elliott	Melling Racing
- Time: 43.894

Most laps led
Driver	Geoff Bodine	Hendrick Motorsports
- Laps: 101

Winner
No. 5	Geoff Bodine	Hendrick Motorsports

Television in the United States
- Network: CBS
- Announcers: Ken Squier, David Hobbs, Ned Jarrett

Radio in the United States
- Radio: Motor Racing Network

The 1986 Daytona 500 was the first stock car race of the 1986 NASCAR Winston Cup Series and the 28th iteration of the event. The race was held on Sunday, February 16, 1986, before an audience of 125,000 in Daytona Beach, Florida at Daytona International Speedway.

In the final laps of the race, Richard Childress Racing's Dale Earnhardt and Hendrick Motorsports' Geoff Bodine engaged in a battle for the victory. However, by the final lap, Earnhardt ran out of fuel, leading Bodine to cruise to an easy victory, having dominated for a majority of the race. The victory was Bodine's fourth career NASCAR Winston Cup Series victory, his first victory of the season, and his only Daytona 500 victory. Hagan Enterprises' Terry Labonte and Junior Johnson & Associates' Darrell Waltrip finished second and third, respectively.

== Background ==
The layout of Daytona International Speedway, the venue where the race was held.

Daytona International Speedway is one of three superspeedways to hold NASCAR races, the other two being Indianapolis Motor Speedway and Talladega Superspeedway. The standard track at Daytona International Speedway is a four-turn superspeedway that is 2.5 miles (4.0 km) long. The track's turns are banked at 31 degrees, while the front stretch, the location of the finish line, is banked at 18 degrees.

=== Entry list ===
- (R) denotes rookie driver.

#	Driver	Team	Make	Sponsor
0	Delma Cowart	H. L. Waters Racing	Chevrolet	Heyward Grooms Construction, Carey Hillard's Restaurants
1	Sterling Marlin	Ellington Racing	Chevrolet	Bull's-Eye Barbecue Sauce
2	Kirk Bryant	Cliff Stewart Racing	Pontiac	Cliff Stewart Racing
02	Mark Martin	Gunderman Racing	Ford	Lone Star Peterbilt
3	Dale Earnhardt	Richard Childress Racing	Chevrolet	Wrangler
4	Rick Wilson	Morgan–McClure Motorsports	Oldsmobile	Cap'n Coty's
5	Geoff Bodine	Hendrick Motorsports	Chevrolet	Levi Garrett
6	Trevor Boys	U.S. Racing	Chevrolet	Finky's
7	Kyle Petty	Wood Brothers Racing	Ford	7-Eleven
07	Randy LaJoie	Bob Johnson Racing	Chevrolet	Snellman Construction
8	Bobby Hillin Jr.	Stavola Brothers Racing	Chevrolet	Miller American
9	Bill Elliott	Melling Racing	Ford	Coors
10	Greg Sacks	DiGard Motorsports	Pontiac	TRW Automotive
11	Darrell Waltrip	Junior Johnson & Associates	Chevrolet	Budweiser
12	Neil Bonnett	Junior Johnson & Associates	Chevrolet	Budweiser
14	A. J. Foyt	A. J. Foyt Racing	Oldsmobile	Copenhagen
15	Ricky Rudd	Bud Moore Engineering	Ford	Motorcraft Quality Parts
17	Doug Heveron	Hamby Racing	Chevrolet	Protecta Truck Bed Liner
18	Tommy Ellis	Freedlander Motorsports	Chevrolet	Freedlander Financial
19	Bob Park	Park Racing	Pontiac	Park Racing
21	Larry Pearson	Pearson Racing	Chevrolet	Chattanooga Chew
22	Bobby Allison	Stavola Brothers Racing	Buick	Miller American
23	Michael Waltrip (R)	Bahari Racing	Pontiac	Hawaiian Punch
25	Tim Richmond	Hendrick Motorsports	Chevrolet	Folgers
26	Joe Ruttman	King Racing	Buick	Quaker State
27	Rusty Wallace	Blue Max Racing	Pontiac	Alugard
28	Cale Yarborough	Ranier-Lundy Racing	Ford	Hardee's
29	Grant Adcox	Adcox Racing	Chevrolet	Herb Adcox Chevrolet
32	Alan Kulwicki (R)	Terry Racing	Ford	Quincy's Steakhouse
33	Harry Gant	Mach 1 Racing	Chevrolet	Skoal Bandit
39	Blackie Wangerin	Wangerin Racing	Ford	Wangerin Racing
42	Dick Trickle	Billy Matthews Racing	Chevrolet	Bill's Barbeque
43	Richard Petty	Petty Enterprises	Pontiac	STP
44	Terry Labonte	Hagan Enterprises	Oldsmobile	Piedmont Airlines
47	Morgan Shepherd	Race Hill Farm Team	Chevrolet	Race Hill Farm Team
48	Ron Esau	Hylton Motorsports	Chevrolet	Hylton Motorsports
49	Ferdin Wallace	H. L. Waters Racing	Chevrolet	Clearfield Speedway
52	Jimmy Means	Jimmy Means Racing	Pontiac	WNDB
53	Donny Paul	Paul Racing	Chevrolet	Paul Racing
54	Slick Johnson (Note: Driver changed to Eddie Bierschwale for the race after Bierschwale and Kodak paid Johnson to drive Johnson's car. Bierschwale had failed to qualify for the Daytona 500 in the Twin 125s.)	Gray Racing	Chevrolet	Gray Racing
55	Benny Parsons	Jackson Bros. Motorsports	Oldsmobile	Copenhagen
57	Jody Ridley	RahMoc Enterprises	Ford	Nationwise Automotive
60	Dick Skillen	Goff Racing	Chevrolet	Goff Racing
64	Pancho Carter	Langley Racing	Ford	Kmart
66	Phil Parsons	Jackson Bros. Motorsports	Oldsmobile	Skoal
67	Buddy Arrington	Arrington Racing	Ford	Jim Peacock Ford, Pannill Sweatshirts
70	J. D. McDuffie	McDuffie Racing	Pontiac	Rumple Furniture
71	Dave Marcis	Marcis Auto Racing	Pontiac	Helen Rae Special
73	Phil Barkdoll	Barkdoll Racing	Ford	Helen Rae Special
74	Bobby Wawak	Wawak Racing	Chevrolet	Superior Piping
75	Lake Speed	RahMoc Enterprises	Pontiac	Nationwise Automotive
76	Clark Dwyer	Arrington Racing	Ford	Arrington Racing
77	Ken Ragan	Ragan Racing	Chevrolet	McCord Gasket
81	Chet Fillip (R)	Fillip Racing	Ford	Circle Bar Truck Corral
82	Mark Stahl	Stahl Racing	Ford	Auto Bell Car Wash
88	Buddy Baker	Baker–Schiff Racing	Oldsmobile	Crisco
89	Jim Sauter	Mueller Brothers Racing	Pontiac	Evinrude Outboard Motors
90	Ken Schrader	Donlavey Racing	Ford	Red Baron Frozen Pizza
94	Eddie Bierschwale	Eller Racing	Pontiac	Kodak Film
95	Davey Allison	Sadler Brothers Racing	Chevrolet	Sadler Brothers Racing
98	Ron Bouchard	Curb Racing	Pontiac	Valvoline
99	Connie Saylor	Ball Motorsports	Chevrolet	Hayes Jewelers

== Qualifying ==
Qualifying was set by the 1986 7-Eleven Twin 125s. The top two positions were set by qualifying speeds held for the Twin 125 Qualifiers held on Monday, February 10, with the top two qualifiers in the session earning the top two positions for the Daytona 500. The rest of the starting was set in the Twin 125 Qualifiers, held on Thursday, February 13, during two races. The top 14 finishers in the first race, excluding the pole position winner, set the inside row from rows two to 15, and the top 14 finishers in the second race, excluding the outside pole position winner, set the outside row from rows two to 15. The remaining non-qualifiers set positions 31-40 based on qualifying speeds from the first qualifying session held on Saturday. If needed, up to two extra provisionals were given to teams high enough in the previous season's owner's standings that did not qualify for the race by either qualifying speed or from the Twin 125 Qualifiers.

Bill Elliott, driving for Melling Racing, won the pole, setting a time of 43.894 and an average speed of 205.039 miles per hour (329.978 km/h) in Monday's session.

20 drivers failed to qualify.

=== Full qualifying results ===
Pos.	#	Driver	Team	Make	Reason
1	9	Bill Elliott	Melling Racing	Ford	Qualified on pole
2	5	Geoff Bodine	Hendrick Motorsports	Chevrolet	Qualified on outside pole
3	22	Bobby Allison	Stavola Brothers Racing	Buick	Second in Twin 125 #1
4	3	Dale Earnhardt	Richard Childress Racing	Chevrolet	First in Twin 125 #2
5	44	Terry Labonte	Hagan Enterprises	Oldsmobile	Third in Twin 125 #1
6	11	Darrell Waltrip	Junior Johnson & Associates	Chevrolet	Third in Twin 125 #2
7	7	Kyle Petty	Wood Brothers Racing	Ford	Fourth in Twin 125 #1
8	27	Rusty Wallace	Blue Max Racing	Pontiac	Fifth in Twin 125 #2
9	1	Sterling Marlin	Ellington Racing	Chevrolet	Fifth in Twin 125 #1
10	71	Dave Marcis	Marcis Auto Racing	Pontiac	Sixth in Twin 125 #2
11	43	Richard Petty	Petty Enterprises	Pontiac	Sixth in Twin 125 #1
12	28	Cale Yarborough	Ranier-Lundy Racing	Ford	Seventh in Twin 125 #2
13	12	Neil Bonnett	Junior Johnson & Associates	Chevrolet	Seventh in Twin 125 #1
14	33	Harry Gant	Mach 1 Racing	Chevrolet	Eighth in Twin 125 #2
15	98	Ron Bouchard	Curb Racing	Pontiac	Eighth in Twin 125 #1
16	88	Buddy Baker	Baker–Schiff Racing	Oldsmobile	Ninth in Twin 125 #2
17	4	Rick Wilson	Morgan–McClure Motorsports	Oldsmobile	Ninth in Twin 125 #1
18	6	Trevor Boys	U.S. Racing	Chevrolet	Tenth in Twin 125 #2
19	66	Phil Parsons	Jackson Bros. Motorsports	Oldsmobile	Tenth in Twin 125 #1
20	18	Tommy Ellis	Freedlander Motorsports	Chevrolet	11th in Twin 125 #2
21	14	A. J. Foyt	A. J. Foyt Racing	Oldsmobile	11th in Twin 125 #1
22	21	Larry Pearson	Pearson Racing	Chevrolet	12th in Twin 125 #2
23	15	Ricky Rudd	Bud Moore Engineering	Ford	12th in Twin 125 #1
24	8	Bobby Hillin Jr.	Stavola Brothers Racing	Chevrolet	13th in Twin 125 #2
25	02	Mark Martin	Gunderman Racing	Ford	13th in Twin 125 #1
26	89	Jim Sauter	Mueller Brothers Racing	Pontiac	14th in Twin 125 #2
27	10	Greg Sacks	DiGard Motorsports	Pontiac	14th in Twin 125 #1
28	64	Pancho Carter	Langley Racing	Ford	15th in Twin 125 #2
29	42	Dick Trickle	Billy Matthews Racing	Chevrolet	15th in Twin 125 #1
30	55	Benny Parsons	Jackson Bros. Motorsports	Oldsmobile	Speed provisional (200.411)
31	54	Slick Johnson	Gray Racing	Chevrolet	Speed provisional (200.983)
32	2	Kirk Bryant	Cliff Stewart Racing	Pontiac	Speed provisional (200.196)
33	26	Joe Ruttman	King Racing	Buick	Speed provisional (200.566)
34	17	Doug Heveron	Hamby Racing	Chevrolet	Speed provisional (199.172)
35	57	Jody Ridley	RahMoc Enterprises	Ford	Speed provisional (199.836)
36	75	Lake Speed	RahMoc Enterprises	Pontiac	Speed provisional (199.018)
37	67	Buddy Arrington	Arrington Racing	Ford	Speed provisional (199.106)
Forced to start at rear
38	77	Ken Ragan	Ragan Racing	Chevrolet	Speed provisional (200.906)
39	25	Tim Richmond	Hendrick Motorsports	Chevrolet	Speed provisional (202.643)
40	47	Morgan Shepherd	Race Hill Farm Team	Chevrolet	Fourth in Twin 125 #2
Provisionals
41	90	Ken Schrader	Donlavey Racing	Ford	Owner's points provisional
42	52	Jimmy Means	Jimmy Means Racing	Pontiac	Owner's points provisional
Failed to qualify
43	53	Donny Paul	Paul Racing	Chevrolet	16th in Twin 125 #1
44	94	Eddie Bierschwale	Eller Racing	Pontiac	16th in Twin 125 #2
45	32	Alan Kulwicki (R)	Terry Racing	Ford	18th in Twin 125 #1
46	48	Ron Esau	Hylton Motorsports	Chevrolet	18th in Twin 125 #2
47	70	J. D. McDuffie	McDuffie Racing	Pontiac	20th in Twin 125 #1
48	74	Bobby Wawak	Wawak Racing	Chevrolet	19th in Twin 125 #2
49	76	Clark Dwyer	Arrington Racing	Ford	21st in Twin 125 #1
50	81	Chet Fillip (R)	Fillip Racing	Ford	20th in Twin 125 #2
51	95	Davey Allison	Sadler Brothers Racing	Chevrolet	22nd in Twin 125 #1
52	60	Dick Skillen	Goff Racing	Chevrolet	21st in Twin 125 #2
53	23	Michael Waltrip (R)	Bahari Racing	Pontiac	24th in Twin 125 #1
54	07	Randy LaJoie	Bob Johnson Racing	Chevrolet	22nd in Twin 125 #2
55	82	Mark Stahl	Stahl Racing	Ford	25th in Twin 125 #1
56	99	Connie Saylor	Ball Motorsports	Chevrolet	27th in Twin 125 #2
57	29	Grant Adcox	Adcox Racing	Chevrolet	27th in Twin 125 #1
58	39	Blackie Wangerin	Wangerin Racing	Ford	29th in Twin 125 #2
59	19	Bob Park	Park Racing	Pontiac	28th in Twin 125 #1
60	49	Ferdin Wallace	H. L. Waters Racing	Chevrolet	30th in Twin 125 #2
61	0	Delma Cowart	H. L. Waters Racing	Chevrolet	31st in Twin 125 #1
62	73	Phil Barkdoll	Barkdoll Racing	Ford	31st in Twin 125 #2
Official Twin 125s results
Official starting lineup

== Race results ==
Fin	St	#	Driver	Team	Make	Laps	Led	Status	Pts	Winnings
1	2	5	Geoff Bodine	Hendrick Motorsports	Chevrolet	200	101	running	185	$192,715
2	5	44	Terry Labonte	Hagan Enterprises	Oldsmobile	200	5	running	175	$103,240
3	6	11	Darrell Waltrip	Junior Johnson & Associates	Chevrolet	200	3	running	170	$80,515
4	24	8	Bobby Hillin Jr.	Stavola Brothers Racing	Chevrolet	200	1	running	165	$58,975
5	30	55	Benny Parsons	Jackson Bros. Motorsports	Oldsmobile	199	0	running	155	$47,415
6	15	98	Ron Bouchard	Curb Racing	Pontiac	199	0	running	150	$48,310
7	17	4	Rick Wilson	Morgan–McClure Motorsports	Oldsmobile	199	0	running	146	$36,990
8	8	27	Rusty Wallace	Blue Max Racing	Pontiac	199	0	running	142	$37,840
9	9	1	Sterling Marlin	Ellington Racing	Chevrolet	198	6	engine	143	$37,165
10	36	75	Lake Speed	RahMoc Enterprises	Pontiac	198	0	running	134	$31,430
11	23	15	Ricky Rudd	Bud Moore Engineering	Ford	198	0	running	130	$32,690
12	35	57	Jody Ridley	RahMoc Enterprises	Ford	198	0	running	127	$20,915
13	1	9	Bill Elliott	Melling Racing	Ford	198	2	running	129	$56,070
14	4	3	Dale Earnhardt	Richard Childress Racing	Chevrolet	197	34	engine	126	$61,655
15	34	17	Doug Heveron	Hamby Racing	Chevrolet	197	0	running	118	$21,120
16	7	7	Kyle Petty	Wood Brothers Racing	Ford	195	0	running	115	$23,430
17	29	42	Dick Trickle	Billy Matthews Racing	Chevrolet	194	0	running	112	$15,925
18	18	6	Trevor Boys	U.S. Racing	Chevrolet	191	0	running	109	$19,380
19	20	18	Tommy Ellis	Freedlander Motorsports	Chevrolet	189	3	running	111	$15,035
20	39	25	Tim Richmond	Hendrick Motorsports	Chevrolet	188	7	running	108	$13,875
21	38	77	Ken Ragan	Ragan Racing	Chevrolet	184	0	running	100	$11,870
22	40	47	Morgan Shepherd	Race Hill Farm Team	Chevrolet	181	0	running	97	$15,465
23	37	67	Buddy Arrington	Arrington Racing	Ford	177	0	engine	94	$15,475
24	19	66	Phil Parsons	Jackson Bros. Motorsports	Oldsmobile	174	0	running	91	$12,705
25	26	89	Jim Sauter	Mueller Brothers Racing	Pontiac	138	0	clutch	88	$11,800
26	16	88	Buddy Baker	Baker–Schiff Racing	Oldsmobile	119	0	accident	85	$15,400
27	12	28	Cale Yarborough	Ranier-Lundy Racing	Ford	116	5	accident	87	$12,985
28	33	26	Joe Ruttman	King Racing	Buick	115	0	accident	79	$9,480
29	21	14	A. J. Foyt	A. J. Foyt Racing	Oldsmobile	113	1	engine	81	$11,275
30	14	33	Harry Gant	Mach 1 Racing	Chevrolet	103	0	accident	73	$19,920
31	31	54	Eddie Bierschwale	Gray Racing	Chevrolet	100	0	engine	70	$9,965
32	13	12	Neil Bonnett	Junior Johnson & Associates	Chevrolet	100	32	accident	72	$29,710
33	41	90	Ken Schrader	Donlavey Racing	Ford	91	0	engine	64	$11,300
34	28	64	Pancho Carter	Langley Racing	Ford	79	0	accident	61	$12,925
35	27	10	Greg Sacks	DiGard Motorsports	Pontiac	76	0	clutch	58	$16,670
36	11	43	Richard Petty	Petty Enterprises	Pontiac	63	0	accident	55	$10,790
37	25	02	Mark Martin	Gunderman Racing	Ford	51	0	engine	52	$9,560
38	10	71	Dave Marcis	Marcis Auto Racing	Pontiac	47	0	engine	49	$13,295
39	42	52	Jimmy Means	Jimmy Means Racing	Pontiac	38	0	engine	46	$11,150
40	22	21	Larry Pearson	Pearson Racing	Chevrolet	29	0	engine	43	$9,310
41	32	2	Kirk Bryant	Cliff Stewart Racing	Pontiac	24	0	accident	40	$10,995
42	3	22	Bobby Allison	Stavola Brothers Racing	Buick	21	0	engine	37	$18,760
Failed to qualify
43		53	Donny Paul	Paul Racing	Chevrolet					
44		94	Eddie Bierschwale	Eller Racing	Pontiac					
45		32	Alan Kulwicki (R)	Terry Racing	Ford					
46		48	Ron Esau	Hylton Motorsports	Chevrolet					
47		70	J. D. McDuffie	McDuffie Racing	Pontiac					
48		74	Bobby Wawak	Wawak Racing	Chevrolet					
49		76	Clark Dwyer	Arrington Racing	Ford					
50		81	Chet Fillip (R)	Fillip Racing	Ford					
51		95	Davey Allison	Sadler Brothers Racing	Chevrolet					
52		60	Dick Skillen	Goff Racing	Chevrolet					
53		23	Michael Waltrip (R)	Bahari Racing	Pontiac					
54		07	Randy LaJoie	Bob Johnson Racing	Chevrolet					
55		82	Mark Stahl	Stahl Racing	Ford					
56		99	Connie Saylor	Ball Motorsports	Chevrolet					
57		29	Grant Adcox	Adcox Racing	Chevrolet					
58		39	Blackie Wangerin	Wangerin Racing	Ford					
59		19	Bob Park	Park Racing	Pontiac					
60		49	Ferdin Wallace	H. L. Waters Racing	Chevrolet					
61		0	Delma Cowart	H. L. Waters Racing	Chevrolet					
62		73	Phil Barkdoll	Barkdoll Racing	Ford					
Official race results

== Standings after the race ==
Drivers' Championship standings

Pos	Driver	Points
1	Geoff Bodine	185
2	Terry Labonte	175 (-10)
3	Darrell Waltrip	170 (-15)
4	Bobby Hillin Jr.	165 (–20)
5	Benny Parsons	155 (–30)
6	Ron Bouchard	150 (–35)
7	Rick Wilson	146 (–39)
8	Sterling Marlin	143 (–42)
9	Rusty Wallace	142 (–43)
10	Lake Speed	134 (–51)
Official driver's standings

- Note: Only the first 10 positions are included for the driver standings.

== Notes ==
Previous race: 1985 Winston Western 500	NASCAR Winston Cup Series; 1986 season	Next race: 1986 Miller High Life 400
