= Bob Park (racing driver) =

American racing driver (born 1941)

- Born: June 30, 1941 (age 85); East Northport, New York, U.S.

NASCAR O'Reilly Auto Parts Series career
- 6 races run over 3 years
- Best finish: 71st (1982)
- First race: 1982 Goody's 300 (Daytona)
- Last race: 1984 Goody's 300 (Daytona)
Wins	Top tens	Poles
0	0	0

ARCA Menards Series career
- 6 races run over 6 years
- First race: 1983 Daytona ARCA 200 (Daytona)
- Last race: 1987 Champion Spark Plug 100 (Pocono)
Wins	Top tens	Poles
0	2	0
- Statistics up to date as of October 31, 2024.

Bob Park (born June 30, 1941) is an American former professional stock car racing driver who has previously competed in the NASCAR Busch Series, the ARCA Permatex SuperCar Series, and the NASCAR Featherlite Modified Tour.

Park is the father of former NASCAR Cup Series driver Steve Park.

Park has also competed in series such as the SMART Modified Tour and the World Series of Asphalt Stock Car Racing.

== Motorsports career results ==
=== NASCAR ===
(key) (Bold - Pole position awarded by qualifying time. Italics - Pole position earned by points standings or practice time. * – Most laps led.)

==== Winston Cup Series ====
NASCAR Winston Cup Series results
Year	Team	No.	Make	1	2	3	4	5	6	7	8	9	10	11	12	13	14	15	16	17	18	19	20	21	22	23	24	25	26	27	28	29	NWCC	Pts	Ref
1985	Park Racing	19	Pontiac	DAY; DNQ	RCH	CAR	ATL; DNQ	BRI	DAR	NWS	MAR	TAL	DOV	CLT	RSD	POC	MCH	DAY	POC; DNQ	TAL	MCH	BRI	DAR	RCH	DOV	MAR	NWS	CLT	CAR	ATL	RSD		N/A	0	
1986	Park Racing	19	Pontiac	DAY; DNQ	RCH	CAR	ATL	BRI	DAR	NWS	MAR	TAL	DOV	CLT	RSD	POC; DNQ	MCH	DAY	POC	TAL	GLN	MCH	BRI	DAR	RCH	DOV	MAR	NWS	CLT	CAR	ATL	RSD	N/A	0	

===== Daytona 500 =====
Year	Team	Manufacturer	Start	Finish
1985	Park Racing	Pontiac	DNQ	
1986	Park Racing	Pontiac	DNQ	

==== Busch Grand National Series ====
NASCAR Busch Grand National Series results
Year	Team	No.	Make	1	2	3	4	5	6	7	8	9	10	11	12	13	14	15	16	17	18	19	20	21	22	23	24	25	26	27	28	29	30	31	32	33	34	35	NBGNSC	Pts	Ref
1982	N/A	79	Pontiac	DAY; 34	RCH	BRI	MAR	DAR	HCY	SBO	CRW	RCH	LGY							CAR; 28	CRW	SBO	HCY	LGY	IRP	BRI	HCY	RCH	MAR	CLT	HCY	MAR							71st	352	
1982	N/A	19	Pontiac											DOV; 12	HCY	CLT; 26	ASH	HCY	SBO																				71st	352	
1983	N/A	19	Pontiac	DAY; DNQ	RCH	CAR	HCY	MAR	NWS	SBO	GPS	LGY	DOV; 19	BRI	CLT	SBO	HCY	ROU	SBO	ROU	CRW	ROU	SBO	HCY	LGY	IRP	GPS	BRI	HCY	DAR	RCH	NWS	SBO	MAR	ROU	CLT	HCY	MAR	122nd	106	
1984	N/A	19	Pontiac	DAY; 29	RCH	CAR	HCY	MAR	DAR	ROU	NSV	LGY	MLW	DOV	CLT	SBO	HCY	ROU	SBO	ROU	HCY	IRP	LGY	SBO	BRI	DAR	RCH	NWS	CLT	HCY	CAR	MAR							94th	76	

=== ARCA Permatex SuperCar Series ===
(key) (Bold – Pole position awarded by qualifying time. Italics – Pole position earned by points standings or practice time. * – Most laps led.)

ARCA Permatex SuperCar Series results
Year	Team	No.	Make	1	2	3	4	5	6	7	8	9	10	11	12	13	14	15	16	17	18	19	20	APSSC	Pts	Ref
1982	Dennis Peters	19	Pontiac	NSV	DAY; DNQ	TAL	FRS	CMS	WIN	NSV	TAT	TAL	FRS	BFS	MIL	SND								N/A	0	
1983	Dennis Peters	19	Pontiac	DAY; 6	NSV	TAL	LPR	LPR	ISF	IRP	SSP	FRS	BFS	WIN	LPR	POC	TAL	MCS	FRS	MIL	DSF	ZAN	SND	N/A	0	
1984	Bob Park	19	Pontiac	DAY; 30	ATL	TAL	CSP	SMS	FRS	MCS	LCS	IRP	TAL	FRS	ISF	DSF	TOL	MGR						N/A	0	
1985	Bob Park	19	Pontiac	ATL	DAY; 9	ATL	TAL	ATL	SSP	IRP	CSP	FRS	IRP	OEF	ISF	DSF	TOL							N/A	0	
1986	Bob Park	19	Pontiac	ATL; 13	DAY; 16	ATL	TAL	SIR	SSP	FRS	KIL	CSP	TAL	BLN	ISF	DSF	TOL	MCS	ATL					N/A	0	
1987	Bob Park	19	Pontiac	DAY	ATL	TAL	DEL	ACS	TOL	ROC	POC; 13	FRS	KIL	TAL	FRS	ISF	INF	DSF	SLM	ATL				N/A	0	
