= Steve Park =

American racing driver (born 1967)

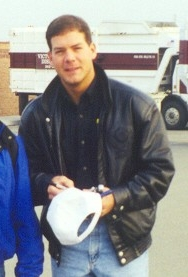
- Park in 1999
- Born: August 23, 1967 (age 59); East Northport, New York, U.S.
- Achievements: 1992, 1993 World Series of Asphalt Tour-Type Modified Champion; 2013 UNOH Battle at the Beach Winner
- Awards: 1997 NASCAR Busch Series Rookie of the Year; 2004 NASCAR Craftsman Truck Series Most Popular Driver

NASCAR Cup Series career
- 183 races run over 9 years
- 2011 position: 52nd
- Best finish: 11th (2000)
- First race: 1997 The Bud At The Glen (Watkins Glen)
- Last race: 2011 Aaron's 499 (Talladega)
- First win: 2000 Global Crossing @ The Glen (Watkins Glen)
- Last win: 2001 Dura Lube 400 (Rockingham)
Wins	Top tens	Poles
2	35	4

NASCAR O'Reilly Auto Parts Series career
- 56 races run over 8 years
- Best finish: 3rd (1997)
- First race: 1990 Pontiac 300 (Nazareth)
- Last race: 2006 Kroger 200 (IRP)
- First win: 1997 BellSouth Mobility / Opryland 320 (Nashville Speedway)
- Last win: 1997 Autolite Platinum 250 (Richmond)
Wins	Top tens	Poles
3	29	1

NASCAR FedEx Freight Truck Series career
- 65 races run over 7 years
- Best finish: 9th (2004)
- First race: 1996 Cummins 200 (IRP)
- Last race: 2010 Lucas Oil 150 (Phoenix)
- First win: 2005 American Racing Wheels 200 (California)
Wins	Top tens	Poles
1	16	1

NASCAR K&N Pro Series East
- Years active: 1990, 1996, 2006–2010
- Starts: 42
- Wins: 3
- Poles: 1
- Best finish: 5th in 2009

Previous series
- 1986–1996 2004–2005: Whelen Modified Tour
- Statistics up to date as of June 13, 2012.

Stephen Brian Park (born August 23, 1967) is an American former professional stock car racing driver. He won races in NASCAR's two top Northeast touring series (Modified and K&N East) and all three national divisions (Truck, Busch, Cup Series). Park was born in East Northport, New York as the youngest of four sons.

Park began racing not in an entry-level class, but in NASCAR Modifieds on Long Island for longtime National Modified Championship contender Bob Park. After establishing himself in weekly Modified racing at Riverhead Raceway, he advanced to the Featherlite Modified Series. He won several races and became a championship contender before moving on to the Busch Series. He won twice in NASCAR's highest division, but two serious injuries impacted his Cup Series career.

== NASCAR career ==
=== 1996–1997 ===
Park was first hired by seven-time Winston Cup Champion Dale Earnhardt in 1996. Initially, Park refused to return Dale's phone messages, who was calling with interest in hiring Park, thinking his friends were pranking him. However, after finally being convinced that the real Dale Earnhardt was calling him, Park made one start in the No. 31 Busch Series (later the Xfinity Series) car in Charlotte in October that resulted in a 29th place finish. Park was then given a full-time ride in Earnhardt's No. 3 AC-Delco-sponsored car for the 1997 season. Throughout the season, Park posted three wins at Nashville, Michigan, and Richmond, walking away with Rookie of the Year honors with a third-place finish in the final points standings.

=== 1997–1999 ===
Park came to the Winston Cup Series (later the NASCAR Cup Series) as the driver for the No. 14 team of Dale Earnhardt Inc. (DEI) in 1997. He attempted eight races in this car, qualifying for four of them. He also ran a race in the No. 40 car at Martinsville Speedway for Felix Sabates. In the 1998 season, Park switched to the No. 1 Chevrolet for DEI and drove the first two races, but he failed to qualify at the third race of the year at Las Vegas. During practice for the fourth event of the year at Atlanta, Park suffered a tire failure and had three hard hits before his car came to rest. He sustained a broken leg, broken collarbone, broken shoulder blade, and two chipped front teeth. Park returned later in the year at Indianapolis and ran the rest of the year. He posted a best finish of eleventh at Michigan and Dover.

In 1999, his first of only two full Winston Cup seasons, Park finished thirty of 34 races. After the first 10 races, his crew chief Philippe Lopez was released from the team, and he was replaced by Paul Andrews at Charlotte, Park Led 82 laps off the event, and for the first time looked competitive in a Cup Series race. Unfortunately, he would crash and finish 42nd. A few weeks later at Sears Point, he was in another hard crash. Park spun in turn two and backed into an embankment, thrusting his car up into the air and over onto the top of a tire barrier. Park posted a best finish of sixth in the Kmart 400 at Michigan and finished fourteenth in the point standings With 5 top ten finishes.

=== 2000–2001 ===
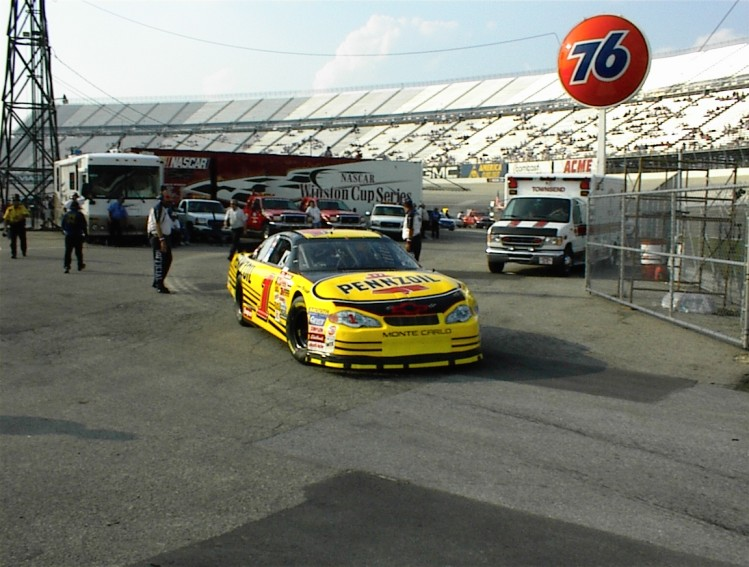
Park's 2001 Cup car at Dover (at the time being driven by Kenny Wallace)

During the 2000 NASCAR Winston Cup Series, Park would grab his first win at his home track of Watkins Glen, winning the 2000 Global Crossing @ The Glen and finish eleventh in the point standings. This would be his best statistical season with career a high six top-fives, and thirteen top-tens.

Park's 2001 season began with a crash in lap 173 of the Daytona 500, in which he was one of eighteen cars involved. He was unhurt and had led for several laps prior to the crash, which itself was overshadowed by his boss Dale Earnhardt's fatal crash on the last lap. The following week, Park scored an emotional win for DEI by winning the Dura Lube 400 at North Carolina Speedway. During the year he had three runner up finishes and Darlington, Texas and Dover. He sat as high as fourth in the points standings. Unfortunately his performance fell off during the summer, and he dropped as low as thirteenth. He also competed in the Busch Series that season, but on September 1, he was injured in a crash at Darlington Raceway while driving the No. 31 Chevrolet for Marsh Racing. While under caution, his steering wheel came off, causing him to yank a hard left. At the same time, Larry Foyt was speeding up to join the front for the restart, and he rammed the driver side of Park's car. Park was 10th in the Winston Cup Series standing at the time of the accident. The incident marked the beginning of Park's struggles to get back into NASCAR's upper divisions.

=== 2002–2003 ===
Park missed the first four races in 2002, but he returned to race at the fifth race of the year at Darlington, where he crashed after leading nineteen laps, finishing 39th. Parks season was highlighted by his many wrecks that cost him chances to just finish races. The largest incident was a flip at Pocono Raceway. During the first lap, Park tried to get to the outside of Rusty Wallace but Wallace tried to block Park and he put Wallace in the wall. Park turned left to avoid where he spun into and was turned by his teammate Dale Earnhardt Jr. Jr's car got under Park and Park hit the infield barrier with tremendous velocity, causing him to flip over. Fortunately, neither drivers were injured and Park and Jr. walked with each other to the waiting ambulance to the infield care center. The race had a 65-minute red flag to repair the old-fashioned guardrail highway barrier that Park hit. The barriers were replaced afterwards. Park finished the year a disappointing 33rd in the standings with only two top-tens on the year. His best finish was a sixth at Talladega. By comparison to his previous season, and his teammates who won a combined three races and finished top-fifteen in points, Park was in the hot seat going into 2003.

During the start of the 2003 NASCAR Winston Cup Series, Park continued to put up poor results, sitting 33rd in points with only one top-ten finish during the first eleven races. Dale Earnhardt, Inc. let Park go midway into the season, and he was effectively "traded" to Richard Childress Racing for Jeff Green, who took over the No. 1 car from Park with Park taking over the No. 30 car for Childress. A few days later, he won the pole for the Winston All Star Open, but at the start of the race he jumped the start and had to start from the rear. He never made it to the next round. His best finish at RCR was a fifth place finish at Michigan that June, as he fought then-teammate Robby Gordon for that position. Along with his three top-ten finishes, Park also scored two poles at Fontana (for Dale Earnhardt inc), and Daytona (for Richard Childress Racing).

=== 2004–2005 ===
At the end of the 2003 season, Park announced he would not return to the No. 30 car and would join the Craftsman Truck Series the following season. He joined Las Vegas-owned team Orleans Racing and piloted the No. 62 truck, vacated by Brendan Gaughan who was offered a ride in the No. 77 Nextel Cup car for Penske Racing. Although Park never won a race in 2004, he finished ninth in CTS driver points, and was voted Most Popular Driver by his peers.

In 2005, Park won the Craftsman Truck Series American Racing Wheels 200, the second race of the season at California Speedway, and became the tenth driver to win a race in all three of NASCAR's top racing series (one of seven drivers to accomplish the feat in the 2005 season alone). However, Park and the team struggled the rest of the season, and in October, right before the truck race in Martinsville, Park and Orleans Racing parted ways due to Dodge pulling support and money to many truck teams.

=== 2008–2010 ===
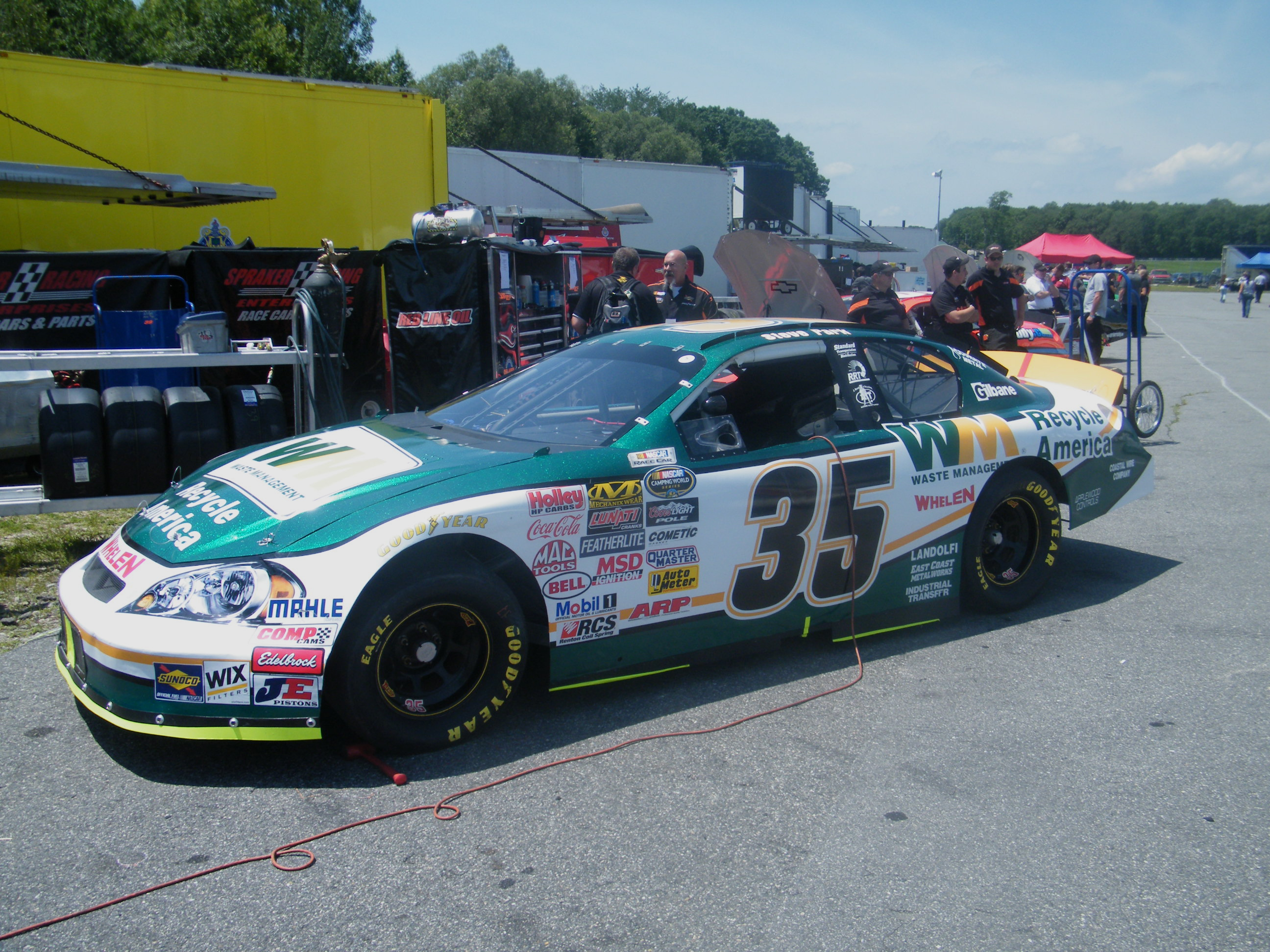
Park's 2009 East Series car

In 2008, Park signed with NDS Motorsports and drove the No. 35 Monte Carlo in all thirteen of the NASCAR Camping World East Series events. He finished ninth in the standings with his best finish being second place at New Hampshire Motor Speedway.

In 2009, Park returned to race in the No. 35 Monte Carlo in the NASCAR Camping World East Series. He finished fifth in the point standings. Park made a single start in a Chevy for Corrie Stott Racing in the Camping World Truck Series, starting 31st and finishing 25th. On August 1, 2009, he won the Edge Hotel 150 at Adirondack International Speedway. It was his first East Series win since July 1, 1996 at Nazareth Speedway.

In 2010, Park returned again to race in the East Series. Park also drove the numbers 46 and 41 Vandyk Baler Corp/ Bollegraaf Toyotas in the NASCAR Camping World Truck Series for Eddie Sharp Racing in 2010 for three races (two in the 41 and one in the 46), with a best finish of eighteenth at Chicagoland Speedway.

Park returned to the Sprint Cup Series in July 2010, driving the No. 36 Chevrolet for Tommy Baldwin Racing. In his first Sprint Cup Series race in several years, Park started the Coke Zero 400 at Daytona from the 39th position, as qualifying was rained out. He went on to finish thirteenth and led one lap. Park's fan-sponsored car was painted to honor Richie Evans, a nine-time NASCAR Modified champion who was killed in a racing accident shortly after winning his final championship in 1985.

=== 2011 ===
Park ran one race for Tommy Baldwin Racing at Talladega, however he retired from the race after completing only four laps in a start and park effort. He also attempted the Sylvania 300 at New Hampshire Motor Speedway later that year, but he failed to qualify. The fan-sponsored New Hampshire car was intended to honor six-time Modified Series champion owner Len Boehler. He also ran two races on the NASCAR Southern Modified Tour, finishing fifth at Connecticut's Thompson Speedway and twelfth at Charlotte.

== Post-NASCAR ==
In October 2012, Park spoke to ESPN in support of IMPACT (Immediate Post-Concussion Assessment and Cognitive Testing) and other neurological testing for drivers in the wake of his former teammate Dale Earnhardt Jr. being sidelined after sustaining a concussion at Talladega. Park himself was a victim of crashes that took him out of action.

== Return to NASCAR (2013) ==
Park entered a Whelen Modified Tour race during Speedweeks at Daytona. The race was run as part of the inaugural UNOH Battle at the Beach to open Daytona's new backstretch .4 mile short-oval configuration.

On the final lap, Park was pushed from behind by Eric Goodale into race leader Mike Stefanik and inadvertently wound up winning the race. It was Park's first modified racing victory since 1996. Stefanik was visibly upset with the incident, calling it "just bullshit".

== Personal life ==
Park became acquainted with Mariah Carey in high school through mutual friends as they both grew up in the same area.

Park formerly owned and operated a Batteries Plus Bulbs franchise in Mooresville, North Carolina. He sold it in September 2022.

Park was inducted into the Suffolk Sports Hall of Fame on Long Island in the Auto Racing Category with the Class of 2004.

Park has one older brother, Daniel Bud "Danny" Park, who was born in Peoria, Illinois and grew up in Evansville, Indiana.

== Motorsports career results ==
=== NASCAR ===
(key) (Bold – Pole position awarded by qualifying time. Italics – Pole position earned by points standings or practice time. * – Most laps led. ** – All laps led.)

==== Sprint Cup Series ====
NASCAR Sprint Cup Series results
Year	Team	No.	Make	1	2	3	4	5	6	7	8	9	10	11	12	13	14	15	16	17	18	19	20	21	22	23	24	25	26	27	28	29	30	31	32	33	34	35	36	NSCC	Pts	Ref
1997	Dale Earnhardt, Inc.	14	Chevy	DAY	CAR	RCH	ATL	DAR	TEX	BRI	MAR	SON	TAL	CLT	DOV	POC	MCH	CAL	DAY	NHA	POC; DNQ	IND	GLN; 33	MCH	BRI	DAR	RCH	NHA; DNQ	DOV; DNQ		CLT; DNQ	TAL	CAR; 33	PHO; 41	ATL; 15					51st	326	
1997	Team SABCO	40	Chevy																											MAR; 41										51st	326	
1998	Dale Earnhardt, Inc.	1	Chevy	DAY; 41	CAR; 31	LVS; DNQ	ATL; INQ^{‡}	DAR	BRI	TEX	MAR	TAL	CAL	CLT	DOV	RCH	MCH	POC	SON	NHA	POC	IND; 35	GLN; 18	MCH; 11	BRI; 34	NHA; 41	DAR; 24	RCH; 27	DOV; 11	MAR; 24	CLT; 36	TAL; 41	DAY; 33	PHO; 24	CAR; 35	ATL; 17				41st	1322	
1999	Dale Earnhardt, Inc.	1	Chevy	DAY; 34	CAR; 26	LVS; 16	ATL; 32	DAR; 12	TEX; 32	BRI; 23	MAR; 25	TAL; 37	CAL; 24	RCH; 34	CLT; 42	DOV; 16	MCH; 6	POC; 13	SON; 42	DAY; 42	NHA; 12	POC; 8	IND; 15	GLN; 12	MCH; 20	BRI; 31	DAR; 10	RCH; 16	NHA; 15	DOV; 9	MAR; 12	CLT; 10	TAL; 14	CAR; 15	PHO; 15	HOM; 19	ATL; 12			14th	3481	
2000	Dale Earnhardt, Inc.	1	Chevy	DAY; 31	CAR; 9	LVS; 43	ATL; 4	DAR; 39	**BRI**; 7	TEX; 19	MAR; 25	TAL; 32	CAL; 16	RCH; 11	CLT; 9	DOV; 19	MCH; 29	POC; 15	SON; 17	DAY; 33	NHA; 28	POC; 15	IND; 16	GLN; 1*	MCH; 33	BRI; 5	DAR; 10	RCH; 4	NHA; 34	DOV; 4	MAR; 11	CLT; 7	TAL; 19	CAR; 6	PHO; 3	**HOM**; 8	ATL; 18			11th	3934	
2001	Dale Earnhardt, Inc.	1	Chevy	DAY; 31	CAR; 1	LVS; 7	ATL; 43	DAR; 2*	BRI; 9	TEX; 2	MAR; 19	TAL; 31	CAL; 15	RCH; 4	CLT; 22	DOV; 2	MCH; 23	POC; 32	SON; 40	DAY; 20	CHI; 41	NHA; 6	POC; 13	IND; 7*	GLN; 10	MCH; 9	BRI; 7	DAR; INQ^{‡}	RCH	DOV	KAN	CLT	MAR	TAL	PHO	CAR	HOM	ATL	NHA	32nd	2854	
2002	Dale Earnhardt, Inc.	1	Chevy	DAY	CAR	LVS	ATL	DAR; 39	BRI; 24	TEX; 20	MAR; 24	TAL; 34	CAL; 22	RCH; 34	CLT; 38	DOV; 39	POC; 23	MCH; 32	SON; 23	DAY; 34	CHI; 27	NHA; 32	POC; 43	IND; 7	GLN; 39	MCH; 41	BRI; 26	DAR; 36	RCH; 11	NHA; 29	DOV; 26	KAN; 30	TAL; 6	CLT; 15	MAR; 16	ATL; 15	CAR; 24	PHO; 21	HOM; 17	33rd	2694	
2003	Dale Earnhardt, Inc.	1	Chevy	DAY; 29	CAR; 21	LVS; 10	ATL; 16	DAR; 20	BRI; 30	TEX; 39	TAL; 20	MAR; 24	**CAL**; 40	RCH; 43																										32nd	2923	
2003	Richard Childress Racing	30	Chevy												CLT; 27	DOV; 32	POC; 35	MCH; 27	SON; 41	**DAY**; 39	CHI; 26	NHA; 8	POC; 25	IND; 15	GLN; 26	MCH; 5	BRI; 29	DAR; 20	RCH; 31	NHA; 34	DOV; 26	TAL; DNQ	KAN; 22	CLT; 36	MAR; 12	ATL; 36	PHO; 39	CAR; 34	HOM; 19	32nd	2923	
2004	Ultra Motorsports	7	Dodge	DAY	CAR	LVS	ATL	DAR	BRI	TEX	MAR	TAL	CAL	RCH	CLT; DNQ	DOV	POC	MCH	SON	DAY	CHI	NHA	POC	IND	GLN	MCH	BRI	CAL	RCH	NHA	DOV	TAL	KAN	CLT	MAR	ATL	PHO	DAR	HOM	NA	-	
2010	Tommy Baldwin Racing	36	Chevy	DAY	CAL	LVS	ATL	BRI	MAR	PHO	TEX	TAL	RCH	DAR	DOV	CLT	POC	MCH	SON	NHA	DAY; 13	CHI	IND	POC	GLN	MCH	BRI	ATL	RCH	NHA	DOV	KAN	CAL	CLT	MAR	TAL	TEX	PHO	HOM	62nd	129	
2011	Tommy Baldwin Racing	35	Chevy	DAY	PHO	LVS	BRI	CAL	MAR	TEX	TAL; 42	RCH	DAR	DOV	CLT	KAN	POC	MCH	SON	DAY	KEN	NHA	IND	POC	GLN	MCH	BRI	ATL	RCH	CHI	NHA; DNQ	DOV	KAN	CLT	TAL	MAR	TEX	PHO	HOM	52nd	2	
^{†} - Was replaced by Phil Parsons after being injured in practice · ^{‡} - Qualified but replaced by Kenny Wallace

===== Daytona 500 =====
Year	Team	Manufacturer	Start	Finish
1998	Dale Earnhardt, Inc.	Chevrolet	33	41
1999	Dale Earnhardt, Inc.	Chevrolet	23	34
2000	Dale Earnhardt, Inc.	Chevrolet	36	31
2001	Dale Earnhardt, Inc.	Chevrolet	25	31
2003	Dale Earnhardt, Inc.	Chevrolet	32	29

==== Busch Series ====
NASCAR Busch Series results
Year	Team	No.	Make	1	2	3	4	5	6	7	8	9	10	11	12	13	14	15	16	17	18	19	20	21	22	23	24	25	26	27	28	29	30	31	32	33	34	35	NBSC	Pts	Ref
1990	Bill Weeb	84	Pontiac	DAY; DNQ	RCH	CAR	MAR	HCY	DAR	BRI	LAN	SBO	NZH; 28	HCY	CLT	DOV	ROU	VOL	MYB	OXF	NHA	SBO	DUB	IRP	ROU	BRI	DAR	RCH	DOV	MAR	CLT	NHA	CAR	MAR					98th	79	
1991	Bill Weeb	84	Pontiac	DAY; DNQ	RCH	CAR	MAR	VOL	HCY	DAR	BRI	LAN	SBO	NZH	CLT	DOV	ROU	HCY	MYB	GLN	OXF	NHA	SBO	DUB	IRP	ROU	BRI	DAR	RCH	DOV	CLT	NHA	CAR	MAR					NA	-	
1995	Steve Park	84	Chevy	DAY	CAR	RCH	ATL	NSV	DAR	BRI	HCY	NHA	NZH	CLT	DOV	MYB	GLN	MLW	TAL	SBO	IRP	MCH	BRI	DAR	RCH	DOV; 27	CLT	CAR	HOM										94th	82	
1996	Dale Earnhardt, Inc.	31	Chevy	DAY	CAR	RCH	ATL	NSV	DAR	BRI	HCY	NZH	CLT	DOV	SBO	MYB	GLN	MLW	NHA	TAL	IRP	MCH	BRI	DAR	RCH	DOV	CLT; 29	CAR	HOM										91st	76	
1997	Dale Earnhardt, Inc.	3	Chevy	DAY; 7	CAR; 32	RCH; 3	ATL; 42	LVS; 8	DAR; 34	HCY; 13	TEX; 35	BRI; 6	NSV; 1*	TAL; 2	NHA; 2	NZH; 29	CLT; 16	DOV; 5	SBO; 13	GLN; 6	MLW; 5*	MYB; 9	GTY; 15	IRP; 8	MCH; 1	BRI; 2	DAR; 5	RCH; 1	DOV; 5	CLT; 6	**CAL**; 2	CAR; 6	HOM; 12						3rd	4080	
1999	Grubb Motorsports	83	Chevy	DAY	CAR	LVS	ATL	DAR	TEX; DNQ	NSV	BRI	TAL	CAL	NHA	RCH	NZH	CLT	DOV	SBO	GLN	MLW	MYB	PPR	GTY	IRP	MCH	BRI	DAR	RCH	DOV	CLT	CAR	MEM	PHO					NA	-	
1999	Marsh Racing	84	Chevy																																HOM; DNQ				NA	-	
2000	Marsh Racing	31	Chevy	DAY	CAR	LVS; DNQ	ATL	DAR; 17	BRI	TEX; 13	NSV	TAL	CAL	RCH; 6	NHA; 10	CLT	DOV	SBO	MYB	GLN	MLW	NZH	PPR	GTY; 25	IRP	MCH	BRI	DAR; DNQ	RCH; DNQ	DOV; 9	CLT; DNQ	CAR; 12	MEM	PHO; 41	HOM; 29				43rd	999	
2001	Marsh Racing	31	Chevy	DAY	CAR	LVS	ATL	DAR; 7	BRI	TEX	NSH	TAL	CAL	RCH; 9	NHA; 6	NZH	CLT	DOV; 5	KEN	MLW	GLN	CHI; 42	GTY	PPR	IRP	MCH	BRI; 4	DAR; 38	RCH	DOV	KAN	CLT	MEM	PHO	CAR	HOM			46th	840	
2003	Chance 2 Motorsports	8	Chevy	DAY	CAR	LVS; 4	DAR	BRI	TEX	TAL	NSH	CAL	RCH	GTY	NZH	CLT	DOV	NSH	KEN	MLW	DAY	CHI	NHA	PPR	IRP	MCH	BRI	DAR	RCH	DOV	KAN	CLT	MEM	ATL	PHO	CAR	HOM		102nd	160	
2006	Marsh Racing	31	Chevy	DAY	CAL	MXC	LVS; 30	ATL	BRI	TEX	NSH	PHO	TAL	RCH; 41	DAR; 39	CLT	DOV; 37	NSH	KEN	MLW	DAY	CHI	NHA	MAR	GTY; 30	IRP; 32	GLN	MCH	BRI	CAL	RCH	DOV	KAN	CLT	MEM	TEX	PHO	HOM	77th	351	

==== Camping World Truck Series ====
NASCAR Craftsman Truck Series results
Year	Team	No.	Make	1	2	3	4	5	6	7	8	9	10	11	12	13	14	15	16	17	18	19	20	21	22	23	24	25	26	NCWTC	Pts	Ref
1996	Walker Evans Racing	02	Dodge	HOM	PHO	POR	EVG	TUS	CNS	HPT	BRI	NZH	MLW	LVL	I70	IRP; 11	FLM													50th	408	
1996	NEMCO Motorsports	87	Chevy															**GLN**; QL^{†}	NSV	RCH										50th	408	
1996	Roehrig Motorsports	18	Chevy																		NHA; 4	MAR	NWS	SON	MMR	PHO				50th	408	
1996	Dale Earnhardt, Inc.	76	Chevy																								LVS; 15			50th	408	
1997	Dale Earnhardt, Inc.	76	Chevy	WDW	TUS	HOM	PHO	POR	EVG	I70	NHA	TEX	BRI	NZH	MLW	LVL	CNS	HPT	IRP	FLM	NSV	GLN	RCH	MAR	SON	MMR	CAL	PHO; 25	LVS	111th	88	
2004	Orleans Racing	62	Dodge	DAY; 27	ATL; 12	MAR; 26	MFD; 27	CLT; 12	DOV; 13	TEX; 10	MEM; 11	MLW; 4	KAN; 4	KEN; 6	GTW; 31	MCH; 17	IRP; 22	NSH; 5	BRI; 9	RCH; 12	NHA; 14	LVS; 3*	CAL; 8	TEX; 12	MAR; 23	PHO; 6	DAR; 5	HOM; 23		9th	3138	
2005	Orleans Racing	62	Dodge	DAY; 23	CAL; 1	ATL; 35	MAR; 24	GTY; 13	MFD; 20	CLT; 5	DOV; 36	TEX; 16	MCH; 31	MLW; 7	KAN; 32	KEN; 8	MEM; 12	IRP; 30	NSH; 15	BRI; 15	RCH; 18	NHA; 12	LVS; 30	MAR						22nd	2275	
2005	Bill Davis Racing	67	Toyota																						ATL; 34	TEX; 16	PHO	HOM		22nd	2275	
2006	HT Motorsports	59	Ford	DAY	CAL	ATL; 25			CLT; 28		DOV; 21	TEX; 21	MCH; 31	MLW; 16	KAN; 14	KEN	MEM	IRP	NSH	BRI	NHA	LVS	TAL	MAR	ATL	TEX	PHO	HOM		35th	971	
2006	HT Motorsports	59	Dodge				MAR; 36	GTY; 18		MFD; 10																				35th	971	
2009	Corrie Stott Racing	02	Chevy	DAY	CAL	ATL	MAR	KAN	CLT	DOV	TEX	MCH	MLW	MEM	KEN	IRP	NSH	BRI	CHI	IOW	GTW	NHA	LVS	MAR	TAL; 25	TEX	PHO	HOM		90th	88	
2010	Sharp Hartman Racing	41	Toyota	DAY	ATL	MAR	NSH	KAN	DOV	CLT	TEX	MCH	IOW	GTY	IRP	POC	NSH	DAR	BRI	CHI; 18	KEN; 25	NHA	LVS	MAR	TAL	TEX				66th	303	
2010	Eddie Sharp Racing	46	Toyota																								PHO; 19	HOM		66th	303	
^{†} - Qualified for Joe Nemechek

==== K&N Pro Series East ====
NASCAR K&N Pro Series East results
Year	Team	No.	Make	1	2	3	4	5	6	7	8	9	10	11	12	13	14	15	16	17	18	19	20	21	22	23	24	NKNPSEC	Pts	Ref
1990	Bill Weeb	84	Pontiac	DAY	RCH; DNQ	CAR	MAR	OXF	NZH; 28	OXF	DOV	JEN	EPP	MND	OXF	NHA; DNQ	HOL	OXF	IRP	OXF	TMP	RPS	NHA; 13	TMP	DOV	EPP	NHA	43rd	271	
1996	Allen Avery	31	Olds	DAY	LEE	JEN; 8	NZH	HOL																				25th	1478	
1996	Allen Avery	09	Olds						NHA; 1*	TIO	BEE	TMP; 29	NZH; 1	NHA; 13	STA; 14	GLN; 2	EPP	RPS	LEE	NHA; 2	NHA; 36	BEE	TMP; 21	LRP; 4				25th	1478	
2006	NDS Motorsports	35	Ford	GRE	STA	HOL	TMP	ERI	NHA	ADI	WFD	NHA	DOV; 2	LRP														48th	175	
2007	NDS Motorsports	53	Ford	GRE	ELK	IOW	SBO	STA	NHA	TMP	NSH	ADI	LRP	MFD	NHA	DOV; 8												57th	142	
2008	NDS Motorsports	35	Chevy	GRE; 8	IOW; 7	SBO; 8		NHA; 28	TMP; 22	NSH; 6	ADI; 14				DOV; 4	STA; 26												9th	1727	
2008	NDS Motorsports	35	Dodge				GLN; 5					LRP; 7	MFD; 18	NHA; 2														9th	1727	
2009	NDS Motorsports	35	Chevy	GRE; 7	TRI; 15	IOW; 17	SBO; 13	GLN; 6	NHA; 10	**TMP**; 2*	ADI; 1	LRP; 11	NHA; 8	DOV; 6														5th	1571	
2010	Spraker Racing	08	Chevy	GRE	SBO	IOW	MAR; 30	NHA; 25	LRP	LEE	JFC	NHA																35th	261	
2010	Olsen Racing	54	Chevy										DOV; 21															35th	261	

==== Camping World West Series ====
NASCAR K&N Pro Series West results
Year	Team	No.	Make	1	2	3	4	5	6	7	8	9	10	11	12	13	NCWWSC	Pts	Ref
2009	NDS Motorsports	35	Chevy	CTS	AAS	PHO; 3	MAD	IOW	DCS	SON	IRW	PIR	MMP	CNS	IOW	AAS	45th	170	

==== Whelen Modified Tour ====
NASCAR Whelen Modified Tour results
Year	Car owner	No.	Make	1	2	3	4	5	6	7	8	9	10	11	12	13	14	15	16	17	18	19	20	21	22	23	24	25	26	27	28	NWMTC	Pts	Ref
1986	Info not available			ROU	MAR	STA	TMP	MAR	NEG	MND	EPP	NEG	WFD	SPE	RIV	NEG	TMP	RIV; 13	TMP								TMP; 31	MAR				33rd	554	
1986	Bill Weeb Racing	81																		RIV; 11	STA	TMP	POC; 18	TIO	OXF	STA; 14						33rd	554	
1987		91		ROU	MAR	TMP	STA	CNB	STA	MND	WFD	JEN	SPE	RIV; 17	TMP	RPS	EPP	RIV; 21														31st	657	
1987		81																	STA; 17	TMP	RIV	SEE	STA; 16	POC; 21	TIO	TMP	OXF	TMP	ROU	MAR	STA; 15	31st	657	
1988	Info not available			ROU; 24				JEN; 4																								13th	2505	
1988		81	Chevy		MAR; 25				IRP; 24	MND																	MAR; 24					13th	2505	
1988	Bill Weeb Racing	81	Chevy			TMP; 21										TMP; 23																13th	2505	
1988		81					MAR; 16				OSW; 27	OSW; 24	RIV; 21	JEN; 16	RPS; 18		RIV; 14	OSW; 22	TMP; 30	OXF; 20	OSW; 10	TMP; 9	POC; 43	TIO; 11	TMP; 17	ROU; 11						13th	2505	
1989	Postley Motorsports	81	Chevy	MAR; 16	**TMP**; 4	MAR; 12	JEN; 19		IRP; 8	OSW; 15	WFD; 26	MND; 21	RIV; 4	OSW; 19	JEN; 21	**STA**; 18	RPS; 18	RIV; 20	OSW; 10	TMP; 8	TMP; 33	RPS; 14	OSW; 21	TMP; 13	POC; 23	STA; 6	TIO; 2	MAR; 25				12th	3099	
1989	Postley Motorsports	81	Pontiac					STA; 11																								12th	3099	
1989		81	Chevy																										TMP; 8			12th	3099	
1990	Park Racing	24	Chevy	MAR	RCH	TMP	STA	MAR	TMP	STA	MND	HOL	STA	RIV; 20	JEN	EPP	RPS															31st	604	
1990	Info not available																	RIV; DNQ	TMP	RPS												31st	604	
1990	Bill Weeb Racing	81	Chevy																		NHA; 27	TMP										31st	604	
1990	Park Racing	24	Pontiac																				POC; 7	STA	TMP; 10							31st	604	
1990	Merkel Racing Engines	24	Pontiac																							MAR; 8						31st	604	
1991	Curt Chase	77	Pontiac	MAR	RCH	TMP; 7	NHA	MAR; 17	NZH; 20	STA; 4	TMP; 3	FLE; 5	OXF; 9	RIV; 12	JEN; 6	STA; 2	RPS; 6	RIV; 18	RCH; 30	TMP; 14	NHA; 15	TMP; 1	POC; 27	STA; 8	TMP; 6	MAR; 6						11th	2701	
1992	Curt Chase	77	Pontiac	MAR; 26	TMP; 4	RCH; 17	STA; 11	MAR; 5	NHA; 32	NZH; 6	STA; 16	TMP; 3	FLE; 7	RIV; 5	NHA; 3	STA; 16	**RPS**; 6*	**RIV**; 3*	TMP; 28	TMP; 6	NHA; 2	STA; 15	MAR; 9	TMP; 11								4th	2820	
1993	Tony Marciel / Guy Ronzoni	1	Chevy	RCH; 36	STA; 10	TMP; 4	NHA; 7	NZH; 21	STA; 17	**RIV**; 1*	TMP; 8	RPS; 19	**HOL**; 18	LEE; 15	RIV; 20	STA; 5	TMP; 3	TMP; 21	STA; 8	TMP; 18												9th	2136	
1994	Tony Marciel / Guy Ronzoni	1	Chevy	NHA; 4	STA; 9	TMP; 11	NZH; 37	STA; 25	LEE; 4	TMP; 24	RIV; 11	TIO; 18	NHA; 5	**RPS**; 3*	HOL; 4	**TMP**; 4	RIV; 1*	NHA; 1*	STA; 13	SPE; 8*	TMP; 5	NHA; 3	STA; 17	TMP; 14								4th	2877	
1995	Scott Bandzul	8	Chevy	TMP; 5	NHA; 39	STA; 30	NZH; 30	STA; 7	LEE; 21	**TMP**; 3	RIV; 5	**BEE**; 1**	NHA; 1*	JEN; 1*	RPS; 16	HOL; 2*	RIV; 7	**NHA**; 26*	STA; 1*	**TMP**; 1*	**NHA**; 1*	STA; 2	TMP; 4	TMP; 1*								2nd	3019	
1996	Scott Bandzul	8	Chevy	TMP; 1	STA; 19	NZH; 15	STA; 19	**NHA**; 3	JEN; 1	**RIV**; 5*	LEE; 21	RPS; 2	HOL; 3	TMP; 1*	RIV; 3	NHA; 4	**GLN**; 29*	STA; 23	NHA; 1*	NHA; 22*	**STA**; 4*	FLE; 2	TMP; 1*									2nd	2907	
2004	Whelen Engineering	00	Dodge	TMP	STA	WFD	NZH	STA	RIV	LER	WAL	BEE	NHA	SEE	RIV	STA	TMP	WFD	TMP	NHA; 32	STA	TMP										80th	67	
2005	Mystique Motorsports	82	Chevy	TMP	STA	RIV	WFD	STA	JEN	NHA	BEE	SEE	RIV	STA	TMP	WFD	MAR	TMP	NHA	STA; 28	TMP											74th	79	
2013	Michael Smeriglio Racing	20	Ford	TMP	STA	STA	WFD	RIV	NHA	MND	STA	TMP	BRI; DNQ	RIV	NHA	STA	TMP															N/A	-	

==== Whelen Southern Modified Tour ====
NASCAR Whelen Southern Modified Tour results
Year	Car owner	No.	Make	1	2	3	4	5	6	7	8	9	10	11	12	13	14	NSWMTC	Pts	Ref
2011	Bill Park	20	Chevy	CRW	HCY	SBO	CRW	CRW	BGS	BRI	CRW	LGY	THO; 5	TRI	CRW			28th	282	
2011	Jimmy Baker	73	Chevy													CLT; 12	CRW	28th	282	
2013	Michael Smeriglio Racing	20	Ford	CRW	SNM	SBO	CRW	CRW	BGS	BRI; DNQ	LGY	CRW	CRW	SNM	CLT			N/A	-	

=== ARCA Racing Series ===
(key) (Bold – Pole position awarded by qualifying time. Italics – Pole position earned by points standings or practice time. * – Most laps led.)

ARCA Racing Series results
Year	Team	No.	Make	1	2	3	4	5	6	7	8	9	10	11	12	13	14	15	16	17	18	19	20	ARSC	Pts	Ref
2010	NDS Motorsports	53	Ford	DAY	PBE	SLM	TEX	TAL	TOL	POC	MCH	IOW	MFD	POC	BLN	NJE	ISF	CHI	DSF	TOL	SLM	KAN	CAR; 35	134th	55	
