= 1992 Miller Genuine Draft 400 (Richmond) =

22nd race of the 1992 NASCAR Winston Cup Series

Race details
- Race 22 of 29 in the 1992 NASCAR Winston Cup Series
- The 1992 Miller Genuine Draft 400 program cover, featuring Rusty Wallace. Artwork by NASCAR artist Sam Bass.
- Date: September 12, 1992
- Official name: 35th Annual Miller Genuine Draft 400
- Location: Richmond, Virginia, Richmond International Raceway
- Course: Permanent racing facility
- Course length: 0.75 miles (1.21 km)
- Distance: 400 laps, 300 mi (482.803 km)
- Scheduled distance: 400 laps, 300 mi (482.803 km)
- Average speed: 99.917 miles per hour (160.801 km/h)
- Attendance: 69,000

Pole position
Driver	Ernie Irvan	Morgan-McClure Motorsports
- Time: 22.354

Most laps led
Driver	Rusty Wallace	Penske Racing South
- Laps: 231

Winner
No. 2	Rusty Wallace	Penske Racing South

Television in the United States
- Network: TBS
- Announcers: Ken Squier, Neil Bonnett

Radio in the United States
- Radio: Motor Racing Network

The 1992 Miller Genuine Draft 400 was the 22nd stock car race of the 1992 NASCAR Winston Cup Series season and the 35th iteration of the event. The race was held on Saturday, September 12, 1992, before an audience of 69,000 in Richmond, Virginia, at Richmond International Raceway, a 0.75 miles (1.21 km) D-shaped oval. The race took the scheduled 400 laps to complete. At race's end, Penske Racing South driver Rusty Wallace would manage to dominate a majority of the race to take his 21st career NASCAR Winston Cup Series victory and his only victory of the season. To fill out the top three, Roush Racing driver Mark Martin and owner-driver Darrell Waltrip would finish second and third, respectively.

== Background ==
The layout of Richmond International Raceway, the venue where the race was at.

Richmond International Raceway (RIR) is a 3/4-mile (1.2 km), D-shaped, asphalt race track located just outside Richmond, Virginia in Henrico County. It hosts the Monster Energy NASCAR Cup Series and Xfinity Series. Known as "America's premier short track", it formerly hosted a NASCAR Camping World Truck Series race, an IndyCar Series race, and two USAC sprint car races.

=== Entry list ===
- (R) denotes rookie driver.

#	Driver	Team	Make	Sponsor
1	Rick Mast	Precision Products Racing	Oldsmobile	Skoal
2	Rusty Wallace	Penske Racing South	Pontiac	Miller Genuine Draft
3	Dale Earnhardt	Richard Childress Racing	Chevrolet	GM Goodwrench Service Plus
4	Ernie Irvan	Morgan–McClure Motorsports	Chevrolet	Kodak
5	Ricky Rudd	Hendrick Motorsports	Chevrolet	Tide
6	Mark Martin	Roush Racing	Ford	Valvoline
7	Alan Kulwicki	AK Racing	Ford	Hooters
8	Dick Trickle	Stavola Brothers Racing	Ford	Snickers
9	Chad Little	Melling Racing	Ford	Melling Racing
10	Derrike Cope	Whitcomb Racing	Chevrolet	Purolator Filters
11	Bill Elliott	Junior Johnson & Associates	Ford	Budweiser
12	Jeff Purvis	Bobby Allison Motorsports	Chevrolet	Raybestos
15	Geoff Bodine	Bud Moore Engineering	Ford	Motorcraft
16	Wally Dallenbach Jr.	Roush Racing	Ford	Keystone
17	Darrell Waltrip	Darrell Waltrip Motorsports	Chevrolet	Western Auto
18	Dale Jarrett	Joe Gibbs Racing	Chevrolet	Interstate Batteries
21	Morgan Shepherd	Wood Brothers Racing	Ford	Citgo
22	Sterling Marlin	Junior Johnson & Associates	Ford	Maxwell House
25	Ken Schrader	Hendrick Motorsports	Chevrolet	Kodiak
26	Brett Bodine	King Racing	Ford	Quaker State
28	Davey Allison	Robert Yates Racing	Ford	Texaco, Havoline
30	Michael Waltrip	Bahari Racing	Pontiac	Pennzoil
32	Jimmy Horton	Active Motorsports	Chevrolet	Active Trucking
33	Harry Gant	Leo Jackson Motorsports	Oldsmobile	Skoal Bandit
41	Dick Trickle	Larry Hedrick Motorsports	Chevrolet	Kellogg's Frosted Flakes
42	Kyle Petty	SABCO Racing	Pontiac	Mello Yello
43	Richard Petty	Petty Enterprises	Pontiac	STP
48	James Hylton	Hylton Motorsports	Pontiac	Rumple Furniture
49	Stanley Smith	BS&S Motorsports	Chevrolet	Ameritron Batteries
52	Jimmy Means	Jimmy Means Racing	Pontiac	Jimmy Means Racing
55	Ted Musgrave	RaDiUs Motorsports	Ford	Jasper Engines & Transmissions
66	Jimmy Hensley (R)	Cale Yarborough Motorsports	Ford	Phillips 66 TropArtic
68	Bobby Hamilton	TriStar Motorsports	Ford	Country Time
71	Jim Sauter	Marcis Auto Racing	Chevrolet	Marcis Auto Racing
77	Mike Potter	Balough Racing	Buick	Kenova Golf Course Construction
90	Hut Stricklin	Donlavey Racing	Ford	Maxx Race Cards
94	Terry Labonte	Hagan Racing	Oldsmobile	Sunoco

== Qualifying ==
Qualifying was split into two rounds. The first round was held on Friday, September 11, at 5:30 PM EST. Each driver would have one lap to set a time. During the first round, the top 20 drivers in the round would be guaranteed a starting spot in the race. If a driver was not able to guarantee a spot in the first round, they had the option to scrub their time from the first round and try and run a faster lap time in a second round qualifying run, held on Saturday, September 12, at 3:00 PM EST. As with the first round, each driver would have one lap to set a time. For this specific race, positions 21-34 would be decided on time, and depending on who needed it, a select amount of positions were given to cars who had not otherwise qualified but were high enough in owner's points; up to two were given. If needed, a past champion who did not qualify on either time or provisionals could use a champion's provisional, adding one more spot to the field.

Ernie Irvan, driving for Morgan–McClure Motorsports, would win the pole, setting a time of 22.354 and an average speed of 120.784 miles per hour (194.383 km/h) in the first round.

Two drivers would fail to qualify.

=== Full qualifying results ===
Pos.	#	Driver	Team	Make	Time	Speed
1	4	Ernie Irvan	Morgan–McClure Motorsports	Chevrolet	22.354	120.784
2	5	Ricky Rudd	Hendrick Motorsports	Chevrolet	22.408	120.493
3	2	Rusty Wallace	Penske Racing South	Pontiac	22.412	120.471
4	7	Alan Kulwicki	AK Racing	Ford	22.443	120.305
5	28	Davey Allison	Robert Yates Racing	Ford	22.453	120.251
6	66	Jimmy Hensley (R)	Cale Yarborough Motorsports	Ford	22.454	120.246
7	94	Terry Labonte	Hagan Racing	Oldsmobile	22.462	120.203
8	26	Brett Bodine	King Racing	Ford	22.473	120.144
9	15	Geoff Bodine	Bud Moore Engineering	Ford	22.507	119.963
10	25	Ken Schrader	Hendrick Motorsports	Chevrolet	22.516	119.915
11	3	Dale Earnhardt	Richard Childress Racing	Chevrolet	22.520	119.893
12	8	Dick Trickle	Stavola Brothers Racing	Ford	22.520	119.893
13	6	Mark Martin	Roush Racing	Ford	22.526	119.861
14	17	Darrell Waltrip	Darrell Waltrip Motorsports	Chevrolet	22.544	119.766
15	33	Harry Gant	Leo Jackson Motorsports	Oldsmobile	22.546	119.755
16	18	Dale Jarrett	Joe Gibbs Racing	Chevrolet	22.561	119.676
17	42	Kyle Petty	SABCO Racing	Pontiac	22.593	119.506
18	21	Morgan Shepherd	Wood Brothers Racing	Ford	22.621	119.358
19	1	Rick Mast	Precision Products Racing	Oldsmobile	22.653	119.190
20	10	Derrike Cope	Whitcomb Racing	Chevrolet	22.663	119.137
Failed to lock in Round 1
21	16	Wally Dallenbach Jr.	Roush Racing	Ford	22.670	119.100
22	71	Jim Sauter	Marcis Auto Racing	Chevrolet	22.728	118.796
23	30	Michael Waltrip	Bahari Racing	Pontiac	22.737	118.749
24	12	Jeff Purvis	Bobby Allison Motorsports	Chevrolet	22.783	118.509
25	11	Bill Elliott	Junior Johnson & Associates	Ford	22.799	118.426
26	55	Ted Musgrave	RaDiUs Motorsports	Ford	22.857	118.126
27	52	Jimmy Means	Jimmy Means Racing	Pontiac	22.863	118.095
28	90	Hut Stricklin	Donlavey Racing	Ford	22.893	117.940
29	22	Sterling Marlin	Junior Johnson & Associates	Ford	22.898	117.914
30	43	Richard Petty	Petty Enterprises	Pontiac	22.919	117.806
31	68	Bobby Hamilton	TriStar Motorsports	Ford	22.920	117.601
32	9	Chad Little	Melling Racing	Ford	22.985	117.468
33	32	Jimmy Horton	Active Motorsports	Chevrolet	22.988	117.453
34	41	Dave Marcis	Larry Hedrick Motorsports	Chevrolet	23.023	117.274
Provisional
35	49	Stanley Smith	BS&S Motorsports	Chevrolet	23.203	116.364
Failed to qualify
36	77	Mike Potter	Balough Racing	Buick	23.480	114.991
37	48	James Hylton	Hylton Motorsports	Pontiac	24.330	110.974
Official first round qualifying results

== Race results ==
Fin	St	#	Driver	Team	Make	Laps	Led	Status	Pts	Winnings
1	3	2	Rusty Wallace	Penske Racing South	Pontiac	400	231	running	185	$47,115
2	13	6	Mark Martin	Roush Racing	Ford	400	17	running	175	$48,365
3	14	17	Darrell Waltrip	Darrell Waltrip Motorsports	Chevrolet	400	92	running	170	$44,360
4	11	3	Dale Earnhardt	Richard Childress Racing	Chevrolet	400	0	running	160	$29,655
5	9	15	Geoff Bodine	Bud Moore Engineering	Ford	400	0	running	155	$19,980
6	2	5	Ricky Rudd	Hendrick Motorsports	Chevrolet	400	1	running	155	$18,205
7	18	21	Morgan Shepherd	Wood Brothers Racing	Ford	400	0	running	146	$13,055
8	15	33	Harry Gant	Leo Jackson Motorsports	Oldsmobile	400	1	running	147	$16,255
9	10	25	Ken Schrader	Hendrick Motorsports	Chevrolet	400	0	running	138	$15,055
10	26	55	Ted Musgrave	RaDiUs Motorsports	Ford	400	0	running	134	$14,005
11	1	4	Ernie Irvan	Morgan–McClure Motorsports	Chevrolet	400	58	running	135	$18,005
12	17	42	Kyle Petty	SABCO Racing	Pontiac	399	0	running	127	$10,955
13	7	94	Terry Labonte	Hagan Racing	Oldsmobile	399	0	running	124	$10,805
14	25	11	Bill Elliott	Junior Johnson & Associates	Ford	399	0	running	121	$12,805
15	4	7	Alan Kulwicki	AK Racing	Ford	399	0	running	118	$12,855
16	30	43	Richard Petty	Petty Enterprises	Pontiac	399	0	running	115	$10,430
17	6	66	Jimmy Hensley (R)	Cale Yarborough Motorsports	Ford	399	0	running	112	$7,980
18	8	26	Brett Bodine	King Racing	Ford	399	0	running	109	$9,980
19	5	28	Davey Allison	Robert Yates Racing	Ford	398	0	running	106	$15,655
20	12	8	Dick Trickle	Stavola Brothers Racing	Ford	398	0	running	103	$7,330
21	29	22	Sterling Marlin	Junior Johnson & Associates	Ford	398	0	running	100	$9,380
22	24	12	Jeff Purvis	Bobby Allison Motorsports	Chevrolet	398	0	running	97	$9,265
23	21	16	Wally Dallenbach Jr.	Roush Racing	Ford	397	0	running	94	$6,130
24	34	41	Dave Marcis	Larry Hedrick Motorsports	Chevrolet	397	0	running	91	$6,005
25	16	18	Dale Jarrett	Joe Gibbs Racing	Chevrolet	397	0	running	88	$8,855
26	22	71	Jim Sauter	Marcis Auto Racing	Chevrolet	394	0	running	85	$5,780
27	32	9	Chad Little	Melling Racing	Ford	393	0	running	82	$4,155
28	19	1	Rick Mast	Precision Products Racing	Oldsmobile	393	0	running	79	$8,705
29	27	52	Jimmy Means	Jimmy Means Racing	Pontiac	392	0	running	76	$4,105
30	28	90	Hut Stricklin	Donlavey Racing	Ford	389	0	running	73	$4,055
31	33	32	Jimmy Horton	Active Motorsports	Chevrolet	387	0	running	70	$4,055
32	31	68	Bobby Hamilton	TriStar Motorsports	Ford	368	0	running	67	$9,530
33	23	30	Michael Waltrip	Bahari Racing	Pontiac	293	0	crash	64	$8,500
34	35	49	Stanley Smith	BS&S Motorsports	Chevrolet	257	0	axle	61	$3,955
35	20	10	Derrike Cope	Whitcomb Racing	Chevrolet	12	0	engine	58	$5,455
Failed to qualify
36		77	Mike Potter	Balough Racing	Buick					
37		48	James Hylton	Hylton Motorsports	Pontiac					
Official race results

== Standings after the race ==
Drivers' Championship standings

	Pos	Driver	Points
	1	Bill Elliott	3,237
	2	Davey Allison	3,103 (-134)
	3	Alan Kulwicki	3,073 (-164)
	4	Harry Gant	3,023 (–214)
	5	Mark Martin	2,954 (–283)
1	6	Darrell Waltrip	2,873 (–364)
1	7	Kyle Petty	2,864 (–373)
	8	Ricky Rudd	2,822 (–415)
	9	Dale Earnhardt	2,806 (–431)
	10	Morgan Shepherd	2,755 (–482)
Official driver's standings

- Note: Only the first 10 positions are included for the driver standings.

Previous race: 1992 Mountain Dew Southern 500	NASCAR Winston Cup Series; 1992 season	Next race: 1992 Peak Antifreeze 500
