= 1992 Mountain Dew Southern 500 =

21st race of the 1992 NASCAR Winston Cup Series

Race details
- Race 21 of 29 in the 1992 NASCAR Winston Cup Series
- The 1992 Southern 500 program cover, featuring Davey Allison and Richard Petty.
- Date: September 6, 1992
- Official name: 43rd Annual Mountain Dew Southern 500
- Location: Darlington Raceway, Darlington, South Carolina
- Course: Permanent racing facility
- Course length: 1.366 miles (2.198 km)
- Distance: 298 laps, 407.068 mi (655.112 km)
- Scheduled distance: 367 laps, 501.322 mi (806.800 km)
- Average speed: 129.114 miles per hour (207.789 km/h)
- Attendance: 70,000

Pole position
Driver	Sterling Marlin	Junior Johnson & Associates
- Time: 30.309

Most laps led
Driver	Harry Gant	Leo Jackson Motorsports
- Laps: 91

Winner
No. 17	Darrell Waltrip	Darrell Waltrip Motorsports

Television in the United States
- Network: ESPN
- Announcers: Bob Jenkins, Ned Jarrett, Benny Parsons

Radio in the United States
- Radio: Motor Racing Network

The 1992 Mountain Dew Southern 500 was the 21st stock car race of the 1992 NASCAR Winston Cup Series season and the 43rd iteration of the event. The race was held on Sunday, September 6, 1992, before an audience of 70,000 in Darlington, South Carolina, at Darlington Raceway, a 1.366-mile (2.198-kilometre) permanent egg-shaped oval racetrack. The race was shortened from its scheduled 367 laps to 298 laps due to rain. In the final laps of the race, owner-driver Darrell Waltrip and his team decided to pit for fuel only on the final pit stop, contrary to most, who had pitted for tires and fuel. With a shorter pit stop, he was able to lead the final six laps before the red flag was put out to stop the race, with NASCAR officials deciding to end the race early, handing Waltrip the victory. The victory was Waltrip's 84th and final career NASCAR Winston Cup Series victory and his third and final victory of the season. To fill out the top three, Roush Racing driver Mark Martin and Junior Johnson & Associates driver Bill Elliott would finish second and third, respectively.

== Background ==
The layout of Darlington Raceway, the venue where the race was held.

Darlington Raceway is a race track built for NASCAR racing located near Darlington, South Carolina. It is nicknamed "The Lady in Black" and "The Track Too Tough to Tame" by many NASCAR fans and drivers and advertised as "A NASCAR Tradition." It is of a unique, somewhat egg-shaped design, an oval with the ends of very different configurations, a condition which supposedly arose from the proximity of one end of the track to a minnow pond the owner refused to relocate. This situation makes it very challenging for the crews to set up their cars' handling in a way that is effective at both ends.

=== Entry list ===
- (R) denotes rookie driver.

#	Driver	Team	Make	Sponsor
1	Rick Mast	Precision Products Racing	Oldsmobile	Skoal
2	Rusty Wallace	Penske Racing South	Pontiac	Miller Genuine Draft
3	Dale Earnhardt	Richard Childress Racing	Chevrolet	GM Goodwrench Service Plus
4	Ernie Irvan	Morgan–McClure Motorsports	Chevrolet	Kodak
5	Ricky Rudd	Hendrick Motorsports	Chevrolet	Tide
6	Mark Martin	Roush Racing	Ford	Valvoline
7	Alan Kulwicki	AK Racing	Ford	Hooters
8	Dick Trickle	Stavola Brothers Racing	Ford	Snickers
9	Chad Little	Melling Racing	Ford	Melling Racing
10	Derrike Cope	Whitcomb Racing	Chevrolet	Purolator Filters
11	Bill Elliott	Junior Johnson & Associates	Ford	Budweiser
12	Hut Stricklin	Bobby Allison Motorsports	Chevrolet	Raybestos
15	Geoff Bodine	Bud Moore Engineering	Ford	Motorcraft
16	Wally Dallenbach Jr.	Roush Racing	Ford	Keystone
17	Darrell Waltrip	Darrell Waltrip Motorsports	Chevrolet	Western Auto
18	Dale Jarrett	Joe Gibbs Racing	Chevrolet	Interstate Batteries
21	Morgan Shepherd	Wood Brothers Racing	Ford	Citgo
22	Sterling Marlin	Junior Johnson & Associates	Ford	Maxwell House
25	Ken Schrader	Hendrick Motorsports	Chevrolet	Kodiak
26	Brett Bodine	King Racing	Ford	Quaker State
28	Davey Allison	Robert Yates Racing	Ford	Texaco, Havoline
30	Michael Waltrip	Bahari Racing	Pontiac	Pennzoil
31	Bobby Hillin Jr.	Team Ireland	Chevrolet	Team Ireland
33	Harry Gant	Leo Jackson Motorsports	Oldsmobile	Skoal Bandit
41	Dick Trickle	Larry Hedrick Motorsports	Chevrolet	Kellogg's Frosted Flakes
42	Kyle Petty	SABCO Racing	Pontiac	Mello Yello
43	Richard Petty	Petty Enterprises	Pontiac	STP
48	James Hylton	Hylton Motorsports	Pontiac	McElroy's Flower Shop
52	Jimmy Means	Jimmy Means Racing	Pontiac	CAS, Inc.
53	John McFadden	Jimmy Means Racing	Pontiac	Jimmy Means Racing
55	Ted Musgrave	RaDiUs Motorsports	Oldsmobile	Jasper Engines & Transmissions
59	Andy Belmont (R)	Pat Rissi Racing	Ford	FDP Brakes
66	Jimmy Hensley (R)	Cale Yarborough Motorsports	Ford	Phillips 66 TropArtic
68	Bobby Hamilton	TriStar Motorsports	Oldsmobile	Country Time
71	Jim Sauter	Marcis Auto Racing	Chevrolet	Marcis Auto Racing
77	Mike Potter	Balough Racing	Buick	Lance Inc.
83	Lake Speed	Speed Racing	Ford	Purex
94	Terry Labonte	Hagan Racing	Oldsmobile	Sunoco

== Qualifying ==
Qualifying was split into two rounds. The first round was held on Friday, September 4, at 3:00 PM EST. Each driver would have one lap to set a time. During the first round, the top 20 drivers in the round would be guaranteed a starting spot in the race. If a driver was not able to guarantee a spot in the first round, they had the option to scrub their time from the first round and try and run a faster lap time in a second round qualifying run, held on Saturday, September 5, at 11:30 AM EST. As with the first round, each driver would have one lap to set a time. For this specific race, positions 21-40 would be decided on time and depending on who needed it, a select amount of positions were given to cars who had not otherwise qualified but were high enough in owner's points; up to two provisionals were given. If needed, a past champion who did not qualify on either time or provisionals could use a champion's provisional, adding one more spot to the field.

Sterling Marlin, driving for Junior Johnson & Associates, would win the pole, setting a time of 30.309 and an average speed of 162.249 miles per hour (261.114 km/h) in the first round.

No drivers would fail to qualify.

=== Full qualifying results ===
Pos.	#	Driver	Team	Make	Time	Speed
1	22	Sterling Marlin	Junior Johnson & Associates	Ford	30.309	162.249
2	4	Ernie Irvan	Morgan–McClure Motorsports	Chevrolet	30.357	161.992
3	25	Ken Schrader	Hendrick Motorsports	Chevrolet	30.370	161.923
4	11	Bill Elliott	Junior Johnson & Associates	Ford	30.411	161.705
5	17	Darrell Waltrip	Darrell Waltrip Motorsports	Chevrolet	30.419	161.662
6	28	Davey Allison	Robert Yates Racing	Ford	30.436	161.572
7	66	Jimmy Hensley (R)	Cale Yarborough Motorsports	Ford	30.482	161.328
8	26	Brett Bodine	King Racing	Ford	30.523	161.111
9	7	Alan Kulwicki	AK Racing	Ford	30.547	160.985
10	15	Geoff Bodine	Bud Moore Engineering	Ford	30.566	160.885
11	33	Harry Gant	Leo Jackson Motorsports	Oldsmobile	30.580	160.811
12	16	Wally Dallenbach Jr.	Roush Racing	Ford	30.592	160.748
13	3	Dale Earnhardt	Richard Childress Racing	Chevrolet	30.644	160.475
14	8	Dick Trickle	Stavola Brothers Racing	Ford	30.644	160.475
15	94	Terry Labonte	Hagan Racing	Oldsmobile	30.648	160.454
16	31	Bobby Hillin Jr.	Team Ireland	Chevrolet	30.649	160.449
17	18	Dale Jarrett	Joe Gibbs Racing	Chevrolet	30.658	160.402
18	5	Ricky Rudd	Hendrick Motorsports	Chevrolet	30.675	160.313
19	10	Derrike Cope	Whitcomb Racing	Chevrolet	30.693	160.219
20	1	Rick Mast	Precision Products Racing	Oldsmobile	30.713	160.115
Failed to lock in Round 1
21	2	Rusty Wallace	Penske Racing South	Pontiac	30.764	159.849
22	30	Michael Waltrip	Bahari Racing	Pontiac	30.816	159.579
23	12	Hut Stricklin	Bobby Allison Motorsports	Ford	30.819	159.564
24	68	Bobby Hamilton	TriStar Motorsports	Ford	30.831	159.502
25	6	Mark Martin	Roush Racing	Ford	30.966	158.806
26	21	Morgan Shepherd	Wood Brothers Racing	Ford	31.034	158.458
27	9	Chad Little	Melling Racing	Ford	31.055	158.351
28	41	Dave Marcis	Larry Hedrick Motorsports	Chevrolet	31.162	157.808
29	55	Ted Musgrave	RaDiUs Motorsports	Ford	31.202	157.606
30	42	Kyle Petty	SABCO Racing	Pontiac	31.203	157.600
31	43	Richard Petty	Petty Enterprises	Pontiac	31.351	156.856
32	71	Jim Sauter	Marcis Auto Racing	Chevrolet	31.676	155.247
33	83	Lake Speed	Speed Racing	Ford	31.888	154.215
34	52	Jimmy Means	Jimmy Means Racing	Pontiac	32.135	153.029
35	59	Andy Belmont (R)	Pat Rissi Racing	Ford	33.175	148.232
36	77	Mike Potter	Balough Racing	Buick	-	-
37	53	John McFadden	Jimmy Means Racing	Pontiac	-	-
38	48	James Hylton	Hylton Motorsports	Pontiac	-	-
Official first round qualifying results
Official starting lineup

== Race results ==
Fin	St	#	Driver	Team	Make	Laps	Led	Status	Pts	Winnings
1	5	17	Darrell Waltrip	Darrell Waltrip Motorsports	Chevrolet	298	6	running	180	$66,030
2	25	6	Mark Martin	Roush Racing	Ford	298	26	running	175	$41,355
3	4	11	Bill Elliott	Junior Johnson & Associates	Ford	298	4	running	170	$32,620
4	8	26	Brett Bodine	King Racing	Ford	298	0	running	160	$23,260
5	6	28	Davey Allison	Robert Yates Racing	Ford	298	72	running	160	$38,845
6	17	18	Dale Jarrett	Joe Gibbs Racing	Chevrolet	298	21	running	155	$19,055
7	30	42	Kyle Petty	SABCO Racing	Pontiac	298	0	running	146	$16,310
8	9	7	Alan Kulwicki	AK Racing	Ford	298	0	running	142	$17,890
9	21	2	Rusty Wallace	Penske Racing South	Pontiac	298	7	running	143	$17,060
10	18	5	Ricky Rudd	Hendrick Motorsports	Chevrolet	297	3	running	139	$18,470
11	23	12	Hut Stricklin	Bobby Allison Motorsports	Ford	297	0	running	130	$13,985
12	19	10	Derrike Cope	Whitcomb Racing	Chevrolet	297	0	running	127	$10,690
13	3	25	Ken Schrader	Hendrick Motorsports	Chevrolet	297	0	running	124	$16,600
14	15	94	Terry Labonte	Hagan Racing	Oldsmobile	297	0	running	121	$13,210
15	7	66	Jimmy Hensley (R)	Cale Yarborough Motorsports	Ford	297	0	running	118	$11,320
16	11	33	Harry Gant	Leo Jackson Motorsports	Oldsmobile	297	91	running	125	$18,600
17	16	31	Bobby Hillin Jr.	Team Ireland	Chevrolet	297	0	running	112	$6,880
18	28	41	Dave Marcis	Larry Hedrick Motorsports	Chevrolet	296	0	running	109	$9,205
19	10	15	Geoff Bodine	Bud Moore Engineering	Ford	295	0	running	106	$11,725
20	31	43	Richard Petty	Petty Enterprises	Pontiac	295	0	running	103	$12,055
21	24	68	Bobby Hamilton	TriStar Motorsports	Ford	293	0	running	100	$11,920
22	34	52	Jimmy Means	Jimmy Means Racing	Pontiac	284	0	running	97	$5,900
23	20	1	Rick Mast	Precision Products Racing	Oldsmobile	280	0	running	94	$10,630
24	12	16	Wally Dallenbach Jr.	Roush Racing	Ford	276	0	running	91	$7,355
25	2	4	Ernie Irvan	Morgan–McClure Motorsports	Chevrolet	266	10	transmission	93	$15,395
26	33	83	Lake Speed	Speed Racing	Ford	253	0	running	85	$5,335
27	14	8	Dick Trickle	Stavola Brothers Racing	Ford	242	0	running	82	$6,875
28	1	22	Sterling Marlin	Junior Johnson & Associates	Ford	241	57	running	84	$13,265
29	13	3	Dale Earnhardt	Richard Childress Racing	Chevrolet	241	0	running	76	$16,555
30	29	55	Ted Musgrave	RaDiUs Motorsports	Ford	225	1	crank	78	$9,520
31	26	21	Morgan Shepherd	Wood Brothers Racing	Ford	224	0	crash	70	$9,310
32	35	59	Andy Belmont (R)	Pat Rissi Racing	Ford	212	0	ignition	67	$4,670
33	36	77	Mike Potter	Balough Racing	Buick	164	0	engine	64	$4,605
34	27	9	Chad Little	Melling Racing	Ford	135	0	crash	61	$4,570
35	22	30	Michael Waltrip	Bahari Racing	Pontiac	102	0	engine	58	$8,985
36	32	71	Jim Sauter	Marcis Auto Racing	Chevrolet	47	0	engine	55	$5,900
37	38	48	James Hylton	Hylton Motorsports	Pontiac	13	0	engine	52	$4,330
38	37	53	John McFadden	Jimmy Means Racing	Pontiac	3	0	vibration	49	$4,290
Official race results

== Standings after the race ==
Drivers' Championship standings

	Pos	Driver	Points
	1	Bill Elliott	3,116
	2	Davey Allison	2,997 (-119)
	3	Alan Kulwicki	2,955 (-161)
	4	Harry Gant	2,876 (–240)
	5	Mark Martin	2,779 (–337)
	6	Kyle Petty	2,737 (–379)
4	7	Darrell Waltrip	2,703 (–413)
1	8	Ricky Rudd	2,667 (–449)
2	9	Dale Earnhardt	2,646 (–470)
2	10	Morgan Shepherd	2,609 (–507)
Official driver's standings

- Note: Only the first 10 positions are included for the driver standings.

Previous race: 1992 Bud 500	NASCAR Winston Cup Series; 1992 season	Next race: 1992 Miller Genuine Draft 400 (Richmond)
