= 1992 Peak Antifreeze 500 =

23rd race of the 1992 NASCAR Winston Cup Series

Race details
- Race 23 of 29 in the 1992 NASCAR Winston Cup Series
- The 1992 Peak Antifreeze 500 program cover, featuring Harry Gant, Jeff Purvis, and Bill Elliott.
- Date: September 20, 1992
- Official name: 22nd Annual Peak Antifreeze 500
- Location: Dover, Delaware, Dover Downs International Speedway
- Course: Permanent racing facility
- Course length: 1.6 km (1 miles)
- Distance: 500 laps, 500 mi (804.672 km)
- Scheduled distance: 500 laps, 500 mi (804.672 km)
- Average speed: 115.289 miles per hour (185.540 km/h)
- Attendance: 80,000

Pole position
Driver	Alan Kulwicki	AK Racing
- Time: 24.782

Most laps led
Driver	Bill Elliott	Junior Johnson & Associates
- Laps: 261

Winner
No. 5	Ricky Rudd	Hendrick Motorsports

Television in the United States
- Network: TNN
- Announcers: Mike Joy, Buddy Baker, Neil Bonnett

Radio in the United States
- Radio: Motor Racing Network

The 1992 Peak Antifreeze 500 was the 23rd stock car race of the 1992 NASCAR Winston Cup Series season and the 22nd iteration of the event. The race was held on Sunday, September 20, 1992, before an audience of 80,000 in Dover, Delaware at Dover Downs International Speedway, a 1-mile (1.6 km) permanent oval-shaped racetrack. The race took the scheduled 500 laps to complete. With a call from crew chief Gary DeHart, Hendrick Motorsports driver Ricky Rudd would decide to run the final 19 laps on old tires, pitting for fuel only on lap 481. The call managed to put Rudd ahead of the field, and Rudd would manage to hold off second-place finisher, Junior Johnson & Associates driver Bill Elliott to take his 13th career NASCAR Winston Cup Series victory and his only victory of the season. To fill out the top three, SABCO Racing driver Kyle Petty would finish third.

== Background ==
The layout of Dover Downs International Speedway, the venue where the race was held.

Dover Downs International Speedway is an oval race track in Dover, Delaware, United States that has held at least two NASCAR races since it opened in 1969. In addition to NASCAR, the track also hosted USAC and the NTT IndyCar Series. The track features one layout, a 1-mile (1.6 km) concrete oval, with 24° banking in the turns and 9° banking on the straights. The speedway is owned and operated by Dover Motorsports.

The track, nicknamed "The Monster Mile", was built in 1969 by Melvin Joseph of Melvin L. Joseph Construction Company, Inc., with an asphalt surface, but was replaced with concrete in 1995. Six years later in 2001, the track's capacity moved to 135,000 seats, making the track have the largest capacity of sports venue in the mid-Atlantic. In 2002, the name changed to Dover International Speedway from Dover Downs International Speedway after Dover Downs Gaming and Entertainment split, making Dover Motorsports. From 2007 to 2009, the speedway worked on an improvement project called "The Monster Makeover", which expanded facilities at the track and beautified the track. After the 2014 season, the track's capacity was reduced to 95,500 seats.

=== Entry list ===
- (R) denotes rookie driver.

#	Driver	Team	Make	Sponsor
1	Rick Mast	Precision Products Racing	Oldsmobile	Skoal
2	Rusty Wallace	Penske Racing South	Pontiac	Miller Genuine Draft
3	Dale Earnhardt	Richard Childress Racing	Chevrolet	GM Goodwrench Service Plus
4	Ernie Irvan	Morgan–McClure Motorsports	Chevrolet	Kodak
5	Ricky Rudd	Hendrick Motorsports	Chevrolet	Tide
6	Mark Martin	Roush Racing	Ford	Valvoline
7	Alan Kulwicki	AK Racing	Ford	Hooters
8	Dick Trickle	Stavola Brothers Racing	Ford	Snickers
9	Chad Little	Melling Racing	Ford	Melling Racing
10	Derrike Cope	Whitcomb Racing	Chevrolet	Purolator Filters
11	Bill Elliott	Junior Johnson & Associates	Ford	Budweiser
12	Jeff Purvis	Bobby Allison Motorsports	Chevrolet	Raybestos
15	Geoff Bodine	Bud Moore Engineering	Ford	Motorcraft
16	Wally Dallenbach Jr.	Roush Racing	Ford	Keystone
17	Darrell Waltrip	Darrell Waltrip Motorsports	Chevrolet	Western Auto
18	Dale Jarrett	Joe Gibbs Racing	Chevrolet	Interstate Batteries
21	Morgan Shepherd	Wood Brothers Racing	Ford	Citgo
22	Sterling Marlin	Junior Johnson & Associates	Ford	Maxwell House
25	Ken Schrader	Hendrick Motorsports	Chevrolet	Kodiak
26	Brett Bodine	King Racing	Ford	Quaker State
28	Davey Allison	Robert Yates Racing	Ford	Texaco, Havoline
30	Michael Waltrip	Bahari Racing	Pontiac	Pennzoil
33	Harry Gant	Leo Jackson Motorsports	Oldsmobile	Skoal Bandit
41	Dick Trickle	Larry Hedrick Motorsports	Chevrolet	Kellogg's Frosted Flakes
42	Kyle Petty	SABCO Racing	Pontiac	Mello Yello
43	Richard Petty	Petty Enterprises	Pontiac	STP
48	James Hylton	Hylton Motorsports	Pontiac	McElroy's Flower Shop
52	Jimmy Means	Jimmy Means Racing	Pontiac	Hurley Limo
53	Graham Taylor	Jimmy Means Racing	Pontiac	Jimmy Means Racing
55	Ted Musgrave	RaDiUs Motorsports	Ford	Jasper Engines & Transmissions
66	Jimmy Hensley (R)	Cale Yarborough Motorsports	Ford	Phillips 66 TropArtic
68	Bobby Hamilton	TriStar Motorsports	Ford	Country Time
71	Jim Sauter	Marcis Auto Racing	Chevrolet	Marcis Auto Racing
77	Mike Potter	Balough Racing	Buick	Kenova Golf Course Construction
90	Hut Stricklin	Donlavey Racing	Ford	Maxx Race Cards
94	Terry Labonte	Hagan Racing	Oldsmobile	Sunoco

== Qualifying ==
Qualifying was split into two rounds. The first round was held on Friday, September 18, at 3:00 PM EST. Each driver would have one lap to set a time. During the first round, the top 20 drivers in the round would be guaranteed a starting spot in the race. If a driver was not able to guarantee a spot in the first round, they had the option to scrub their time from the first round and try and run a faster lap time in a second round qualifying run, held on Saturday, September 19, at 11:30 AM EST. As with the first round, each driver would have one lap to set a time. For this specific race, positions 21-38 would be decided on time, and depending on who needed it, a select amount of positions were given to cars who had not otherwise qualified but were high enough in owner's points; up to two were given. If needed, a past champion who did not qualify on either time or provisionals could use a champion's provisional, adding one more spot to the field.

Alan Kulwicki, driving for his own AK Racing team, would win the pole, setting a time of 24.782 and an average speed of 145.267 miles per hour (233.785 km/h) in the first round.

No drivers would fail to qualify.

=== Full qualifying results ===
Pos.	#	Driver	Team	Make	Time	Speed
1	7	Alan Kulwicki	AK Racing	Ford	24.782	145.267
2	6	Mark Martin	Roush Racing	Ford	24.852	144.858
3	2	Rusty Wallace	Penske Racing South	Pontiac	24.936	144.370
4	94	Terry Labonte	Hagan Racing	Oldsmobile	25.016	143.908
5	3	Dale Earnhardt	Richard Childress Racing	Chevrolet	25.119	143.318
6	5	Ricky Rudd	Hendrick Motorsports	Chevrolet	25.123	143.295
7	8	Dick Trickle	Stavola Brothers Racing	Ford	25.143	143.181
8	15	Geoff Bodine	Bud Moore Engineering	Ford	25.149	143.147
9	25	Ken Schrader	Hendrick Motorsports	Chevrolet	25.153	143.124
10	1	Rick Mast	Precision Products Racing	Oldsmobile	25.162	143.073
11	18	Dale Jarrett	Joe Gibbs Racing	Chevrolet	25.181	142.965
12	41	Dave Marcis	Larry Hedrick Motorsports	Chevrolet	25.221	142.738
13	11	Bill Elliott	Junior Johnson & Associates	Ford	25.223	142.727
14	17	Darrell Waltrip	Darrell Waltrip Motorsports	Chevrolet	25.223	142.727
15	22	Sterling Marlin	Junior Johnson & Associates	Ford	25.259	142.523
16	42	Kyle Petty	SABCO Racing	Pontiac	25.278	142.416
17	55	Ted Musgrave	RaDiUs Motorsports	Ford	25.293	142.332
18	26	Brett Bodine	King Racing	Ford	25.324	142.158
19	4	Ernie Irvan	Morgan–McClure Motorsports	Chevrolet	25.336	142.090
20	90	Hut Stricklin	Donlavey Racing	Ford	25.337	142.085
Failed to lock in Round 1
21	21	Morgan Shepherd	Wood Brothers Racing	Ford	24.976	144.138
22	33	Harry Gant	Leo Jackson Motorsports	Oldsmobile	25.015	143.914
23	68	Bobby Hamilton	TriStar Motorsports	Ford	25.015	143.914
24	30	Michael Waltrip	Bahari Racing	Pontiac	25.067	143.615
25	43	Richard Petty	Petty Enterprises	Pontiac	25.184	142.948
26	66	Jimmy Hensley (R)	Cale Yarborough Motorsports	Ford	25.210	142.800
27	16	Wally Dallenbach Jr.	Roush Racing	Ford	25.342	142.057
28	77	Mike Potter	Balough Racing	Buick	25.430	141.565
29	28	Davey Allison	Robert Yates Racing	Ford	25.592	140.669
30	71	Jim Sauter	Marcis Auto Racing	Chevrolet	25.704	140.056
31	10	Derrike Cope	Whitcomb Racing	Chevrolet	25.914	138.921
32	9	Chad Little	Melling Racing	Ford	26.078	138.047
33	12	Jeff Purvis	Bobby Allison Motorsports	Chevrolet	26.303	136.867
34	52	Jimmy Means	Jimmy Means Racing	Pontiac	26.403	136.348
35	53	Graham Taylor	Jimmy Means Racing	Pontiac	27.790	129.543
36	48	James Hylton	Hylton Motorsports	Pontiac	28.024	128.461
Official first round qualifying results
Official starting lineup

== Race results ==
Fin	St	#	Driver	Team	Make	Laps	Led	Status	Pts	Winnings
1	6	5	Ricky Rudd	Hendrick Motorsports	Chevrolet	500	32	running	180	$64,965
2	13	11	Bill Elliott	Junior Johnson & Associates	Ford	500	261	running	180	$51,260
3	16	42	Kyle Petty	SABCO Racing	Pontiac	500	0	running	165	$27,310
4	29	28	Davey Allison	Robert Yates Racing	Ford	499	0	running	160	$29,410
5	21	21	Morgan Shepherd	Wood Brothers Racing	Ford	498	0	running	155	$21,980
6	22	33	Harry Gant	Leo Jackson Motorsports	Oldsmobile	497	16	running	155	$22,205
7	4	94	Terry Labonte	Hagan Racing	Oldsmobile	496	0	running	146	$15,805
8	17	55	Ted Musgrave	RaDiUs Motorsports	Ford	496	0	running	142	$15,105
9	31	10	Derrike Cope	Whitcomb Racing	Chevrolet	495	0	running	138	$11,355
10	23	68	Bobby Hamilton	TriStar Motorsports	Ford	493	0	running	134	$16,805
11	19	4	Ernie Irvan	Morgan–McClure Motorsports	Chevrolet	493	16	running	135	$16,905
12	11	18	Dale Jarrett	Joe Gibbs Racing	Chevrolet	490	0	running	127	$12,505
13	26	66	Jimmy Hensley (R)	Cale Yarborough Motorsports	Ford	487	0	running	124	$9,755
14	8	15	Geoff Bodine	Bud Moore Engineering	Ford	486	0	running	121	$11,405
15	20	90	Hut Stricklin	Donlavey Racing	Ford	484	0	running	118	$6,155
16	3	2	Rusty Wallace	Penske Racing South	Pontiac	483	0	running	115	$13,830
17	24	30	Michael Waltrip	Bahari Racing	Pontiac	483	0	running	112	$10,630
18	30	71	Jim Sauter	Marcis Auto Racing	Chevrolet	475	0	running	109	$7,415
19	2	6	Mark Martin	Roush Racing	Ford	470	92	engine	111	$13,830
20	14	17	Darrell Waltrip	Darrell Waltrip Motorsports	Chevrolet	470	0	running	103	$15,480
21	5	3	Dale Earnhardt	Richard Childress Racing	Chevrolet	470	82	running	105	$17,880
22	18	26	Brett Bodine	King Racing	Ford	430	0	running	97	$10,130
23	34	52	Jimmy Means	Jimmy Means Racing	Pontiac	399	0	engine	94	$5,230
24	10	1	Rick Mast	Precision Products Racing	Oldsmobile	398	0	running	91	$9,930
25	28	77	Mike Potter	Balough Racing	Buick	382	0	running	88	$5,130
26	12	41	Dave Marcis	Larry Hedrick Motorsports	Chevrolet	364	0	handling	85	$6,730
27	7	8	Dick Trickle	Stavola Brothers Racing	Ford	276	0	crash	82	$6,630
28	25	43	Richard Petty	Petty Enterprises	Pontiac	272	0	crash	79	$9,555
29	32	9	Chad Little	Melling Racing	Ford	271	0	crash	76	$4,930
30	9	25	Ken Schrader	Hendrick Motorsports	Chevrolet	263	0	crash	73	$13,880
31	27	16	Wally Dallenbach Jr.	Roush Racing	Ford	214	0	engine	70	$11,260
32	33	12	Jeff Purvis	Bobby Allison Motorsports	Chevrolet	179	0	crash	67	$9,305
33	15	22	Sterling Marlin	Junior Johnson & Associates	Ford	175	0	engine	64	$9,230
34	1	7	Alan Kulwicki	AK Racing	Ford	91	1	crash	66	$17,180
35	36	48	James Hylton	Hylton Motorsports	Pontiac	89	0	engine	58	$4,480
36	35	53	Graham Taylor	Jimmy Means Racing	Pontiac	3	0	engine	55	$$4,455
Official race results

== Standings after the race ==
Drivers' Championship standings

	Pos	Driver	Points
	1	Bill Elliott	3,417
	2	Davey Allison	3,263 (-154)
1	3	Harry Gant	3,178 (-239)
1	4	Alan Kulwicki	3,139 (–278)
	5	Mark Martin	3,065 (–352)
1	6	Kyle Petty	3,029 (–388)
1	7	Ricky Rudd	3,002 (–415)
2	8	Darrell Waltrip	2,976 (–441)
	9	Dale Earnhardt	2,911 (–506)
	10	Morgan Shepherd	2,910 (–507)
Official driver's standings

- Note: Only the first 10 positions are included for the driver standings.

Previous race: 1992 Miller Genuine Draft 400 (Richmond)	NASCAR Winston Cup Series; 1992 season	Next race: 1992 Goody's 500
