= 1992 Goody's 500 =

24th race of the 1992 NASCAR Winston Cup Series

Race details
- Race 24 of 29 in the 1992 NASCAR Winston Cup Series
- The 1992 Goody's 500 program cover, featuring Richard Petty.
- Date: September 28, 1992
- Official name: 44th Annual Goody's 500
- Location: Ridgeway, Virginia, Martinsville Speedway
- Course: Permanent racing facility
- Course length: 0.847 km (0.526 miles)
- Distance: 500 laps, 263 mi (423.257 km)
- Scheduled distance: 500 laps, 263 mi (423.257 km)
- Average speed: 75.424 miles per hour (121.383 km/h)
- Attendance: 51,000

Pole position
Driver	Kyle Petty	SABCO Racing
- Time: 20.472

Most laps led
Driver	Rusty Wallace	Penske Racing South
- Laps: 142

Winner
No. 15	Geoff Bodine	Bud Moore Engineering

Television in the United States
- Network: ESPN
- Announcers: Bob Jenkins, Ned Jarrett, Benny Parsons

Radio in the United States
- Radio: Motor Racing Network

The 1992 Goody's 500 was the 24th stock car race of the 1992 NASCAR Winston Cup Series season and the 44th iteration of the event. The race was originally scheduled to be held on Sunday, September 27, 1992, but was delayed to Monday, September 28 due to rain. The race was held before an audience of 51,000 in Martinsville, Virginia at Martinsville Speedway, a 0.526 miles (0.847 km) permanent oval-shaped short track. The race took the scheduled 500 laps to complete. With a final crew chief call to run the final 126 laps on one set of tires, Bud Moore Engineering driver Geoff Bodine would manage to hold off the field to take his 13th career NASCAR Winston Cup Series victory and his first victory of the season. To fill out the top three, Penske Racing South driver Rusty Wallace and King Racing driver Brett Bodine would finish second and third, respectively.

== Background ==
The layout of Martinsville Speedway, the venue where the race was held.

Martinsville Speedway is a NASCAR-owned stock car racing track located in Henry County, in Ridgeway, Virginia, just to the south of Martinsville. At 0.526 miles (0.847 km) in length, it is the shortest track in the NASCAR Cup Series. The track was also one of the first paved oval tracks in NASCAR, being built in 1947 by H. Clay Earles. It is also the only remaining race track that has been on the NASCAR circuit from its beginning in 1948.

=== Entry list ===
- (R) denotes rookie driver.

#	Driver	Team	Make	Sponsor
1	Rick Mast	Precision Products Racing	Oldsmobile	Skoal
2	Rusty Wallace	Penske Racing South	Pontiac	Miller Genuine Draft
3	Dale Earnhardt	Richard Childress Racing	Chevrolet	GM Goodwrench Service Plus
4	Ernie Irvan	Morgan–McClure Motorsports	Chevrolet	Kodak
5	Ricky Rudd	Hendrick Motorsports	Chevrolet	Tide
6	Mark Martin	Roush Racing	Ford	Valvoline
7	Alan Kulwicki	AK Racing	Ford	Hooters
8	Dick Trickle	Stavola Brothers Racing	Ford	Snickers
10	Derrike Cope	Whitcomb Racing	Chevrolet	Purolator Filters
11	Bill Elliott	Junior Johnson & Associates	Ford	Budweiser
12	Jeff Purvis	Bobby Allison Motorsports	Chevrolet	Raybestos
15	Geoff Bodine	Bud Moore Engineering	Ford	Motorcraft
16	Wally Dallenbach Jr.	Roush Racing	Ford	Keystone
17	Darrell Waltrip	Darrell Waltrip Motorsports	Chevrolet	Western Auto
18	Dale Jarrett	Joe Gibbs Racing	Chevrolet	Interstate Batteries
21	Morgan Shepherd	Wood Brothers Racing	Ford	Citgo
22	Sterling Marlin	Junior Johnson & Associates	Ford	Maxwell House
25	Ken Schrader	Hendrick Motorsports	Chevrolet	Kodiak
26	Brett Bodine	King Racing	Ford	Quaker State
28	Davey Allison	Robert Yates Racing	Ford	Texaco, Havoline
30	Michael Waltrip	Bahari Racing	Pontiac	Pennzoil
33	Harry Gant	Leo Jackson Motorsports	Oldsmobile	Skoal Bandit
41	Dick Trickle	Larry Hedrick Motorsports	Chevrolet	Kellogg's Frosted Flakes
42	Kyle Petty	SABCO Racing	Pontiac	Mello Yello
43	Richard Petty	Petty Enterprises	Pontiac	STP
45	Rich Bickle	Terminal Trucking Motorsports	Ford	Terminal Trucking
52	Jimmy Means	Jimmy Means Racing	Pontiac	Jimmy Means Racing
55	Ted Musgrave	RaDiUs Motorsports	Ford	Jasper Engines & Transmissions
57	Bob Schacht (R)	Stringer Motorsports	Oldsmobile	National Pronto Auto Parts
66	Jimmy Hensley (R)	Cale Yarborough Motorsports	Ford	Phillips 66 TropArtic
68	Bobby Hamilton	TriStar Motorsports	Ford	Country Time
71	Jim Sauter	Marcis Auto Racing	Chevrolet	Marcis Auto Racing
90	Hut Stricklin	Donlavey Racing	Ford	Maxx Race Cards
94	Terry Labonte	Hagan Racing	Oldsmobile	Sunoco

== Qualifying ==
Qualifying was split into two rounds. The first round was held on Friday, September 25, at 3:00 PM EST. Each driver would have one lap to set a time. During the first round, the top 20 drivers in the round would be guaranteed a starting spot in the race. If a driver was not able to guarantee a spot in the first round, they had the option to scrub their time from the first round and try and run a faster lap time in a second round qualifying run, held on Saturday, September 26, at 12:30 PM EST. As with the first round, each driver would have one lap to set a time. For this specific race, positions 21-30 would be decided on time, and depending on who needed it, a select amount of positions were given to cars who had not otherwise qualified but were high enough in owner's points; up to two provisionals were given. If needed, a past champion who did not qualify on either time or provisionals could use a champion's provisional, adding one more spot to the field.

Kyle Petty, driving for SABCO Racing, would win the pole, setting a time of 20.472 and an average speed of 92.497 miles per hour (148.859 km/h) in the first round.

Three drivers would fail to qualify.

=== Full qualifying results ===
Pos.	#	Driver	Team	Make	Time	Speed
1	42	Kyle Petty	SABCO Racing	Pontiac	20.472	92.497
2	66	Jimmy Hensley (R)	Cale Yarborough Motorsports	Ford	20.678	91.576
3	33	Harry Gant	Leo Jackson Motorsports	Oldsmobile	20.717	91.403
4	1	Rick Mast	Precision Products Racing	Oldsmobile	20.765	91.192
5	4	Ernie Irvan	Morgan–McClure Motorsports	Chevrolet	20.773	91.157
6	10	Derrike Cope	Whitcomb Racing	Chevrolet	20.784	91.109
7	15	Geoff Bodine	Bud Moore Engineering	Ford	20.819	90.955
8	2	Rusty Wallace	Penske Racing South	Pontiac	20.824	90.934
9	17	Darrell Waltrip	Darrell Waltrip Motorsports	Chevrolet	20.848	90.829
10	7	Alan Kulwicki	AK Racing	Ford	20.855	90.798
11	3	Dale Earnhardt	Richard Childress Racing	Chevrolet	20.865	90.755
12	21	Morgan Shepherd	Wood Brothers Racing	Ford	20.880	90.690
13	18	Dale Jarrett	Joe Gibbs Racing	Chevrolet	20.957	90.356
14	6	Mark Martin	Roush Racing	Ford	20.968	90.309
15	43	Richard Petty	Petty Enterprises	Pontiac	20.985	90.236
16	11	Bill Elliott	Junior Johnson & Associates	Ford	20.999	90.176
17	26	Brett Bodine	King Racing	Ford	21.016	90.103
18	30	Michael Waltrip	Bahari Racing	Pontiac	21.032	90.034
19	90	Hut Stricklin	Donlavey Racing	Ford	21.093	89.774
20	41	Dave Marcis	Larry Hedrick Motorsports	Chevrolet	21.099	89.748
Failed to lock in Round 1
21	5	Ricky Rudd	Hendrick Motorsports	Chevrolet	20.910	90.560
22	28	Davey Allison	Robert Yates Racing	Ford	20.927	90.486
23	71	Jim Sauter	Marcis Auto Racing	Chevrolet	20.944	90.413
24	55	Ted Musgrave	RaDiUs Motorsports	Ford	20.990	90.214
25	68	Bobby Hamilton	TriStar Motorsports	Ford	21.061	89.910
26	12	Jeff Purvis	Bobby Allison Motorsports	Chevrolet	21.103	89.731
27	94	Terry Labonte	Hagan Racing	Oldsmobile	21.104	89.727
28	25	Ken Schrader	Hendrick Motorsports	Chevrolet	21.111	89.697
29	8	Dick Trickle	Stavola Brothers Racing	Ford	21.158	89.498
30	22	Sterling Marlin	Junior Johnson & Associates	Ford	21.160	89.490
Provisional
31	16	Wally Dallenbach Jr.	Roush Racing	Ford	21.184	89.388
Failed to qualify
32	45	Rich Bickle	Terminal Trucking Motorsports	Ford	-*	-*
33	52	Jimmy Means	Jimmy Means Racing	Pontiac	-*	-*
34	57	Bob Schacht (R)	Stringer Motorsports	Oldsmobile	-*	-*
Official first round qualifying results
Official starting lineup

== Race results ==
Fin	St	#	Driver	Team	Make	Laps	Led	Status	Pts	Winnings
1	7	15	Geoff Bodine	Bud Moore Engineering	Ford	500	129	running	180	$60,550
2	8	2	Rusty Wallace	Penske Racing South	Pontiac	500	142	running	180	$39,400
3	17	26	Brett Bodine	King Racing	Ford	500	65	running	170	$29,125
4	1	42	Kyle Petty	SABCO Racing	Pontiac	500	135	running	165	$22,000
5	10	7	Alan Kulwicki	AK Racing	Ford	500	3	running	160	$23,330
6	29	8	Dick Trickle	Stavola Brothers Racing	Ford	500	0	running	150	$15,925
7	30	22	Sterling Marlin	Junior Johnson & Associates	Ford	500	13	running	151	$16,350
8	14	6	Mark Martin	Roush Racing	Ford	499	0	running	142	$16,100
9	4	1	Rick Mast	Precision Products Racing	Oldsmobile	499	0	running	138	$13,800
10	21	5	Ricky Rudd	Hendrick Motorsports	Chevrolet	499	0	running	134	$17,200
11	27	94	Terry Labonte	Hagan Racing	Oldsmobile	498	0	running	130	$11,635
12	24	55	Ted Musgrave	RaDiUs Motorsports	Ford	498	0	running	127	$10,950
13	28	25	Ken Schrader	Hendrick Motorsports	Chevrolet	498	0	running	124	$14,240
14	31	16	Wally Dallenbach Jr.	Roush Racing	Ford	497	0	running	121	$7,350
15	9	17	Darrell Waltrip	Darrell Waltrip Motorsports	Chevrolet	496	7	running	123	$14,600
16	22	28	Davey Allison	Robert Yates Racing	Ford	496	0	running	115	$15,150
17	2	66	Jimmy Hensley (R)	Cale Yarborough Motorsports	Ford	495	6	running	117	$10,100
18	15	43	Richard Petty	Petty Enterprises	Pontiac	495	0	running	109	$9,355
19	3	33	Harry Gant	Leo Jackson Motorsports	Oldsmobile	495	0	running	106	$15,150
20	6	10	Derrike Cope	Whitcomb Racing	Chevrolet	492	0	running	103	$6,600
21	12	21	Morgan Shepherd	Wood Brothers Racing	Ford	488	0	running	100	$8,700
22	23	71	Jim Sauter	Marcis Auto Racing	Chevrolet	485	0	running	97	$5,500
23	13	18	Dale Jarrett	Joe Gibbs Racing	Chevrolet	477	0	running	94	$8,150
24	19	90	Hut Stricklin	Donlavey Racing	Ford	477	0	running	91	$3,500
25	20	41	Dave Marcis	Larry Hedrick Motorsports	Chevrolet	474	0	running	88	$4,975
26	26	12	Jeff Purvis	Bobby Allison Motorsports	Chevrolet	468	0	running	85	$7,850
27	5	4	Ernie Irvan	Morgan–McClure Motorsports	Chevrolet	428	0	running	82	$13,150
28	25	68	Bobby Hamilton	TriStar Motorsports	Ford	425	0	running	79	$8,675
29	18	30	Michael Waltrip	Bahari Racing	Pontiac	355	0	crash	76	$7,550
30	16	11	Bill Elliott	Junior Johnson & Associates	Ford	158	0	engine	73	$12,000
31	11	3	Dale Earnhardt	Richard Childress Racing	Chevrolet	111	0	engine	70	$14,550
Failed to qualify
32		45	Rich Bickle	Terminal Trucking Motorsports	Ford					
33		52	Jimmy Means	Jimmy Means Racing	Pontiac					
34		57	Bob Schacht (R)	Stringer Motorsports	Oldsmobile					
Official race results

== Standings after the race ==
Drivers' Championship standings

	Pos	Driver	Points
	1	Bill Elliott	3,490
	2	Davey Allison	3,378 (-112)
1	3	Alan Kulwicki	3,299 (-191)
1	4	Harry Gant	3,284 (–206)
	5	Mark Martin	3,207 (–283)
	6	Kyle Petty	3,194 (–296)
	7	Ricky Rudd	3,136 (–354)
	8	Darrell Waltrip	3,099 (–391)
1	9	Morgan Shepherd	3,010 (–480)
3	10	Rusty Wallace	3,000 (–490)
Official driver's standings

- Note: Only the first 10 positions are included for the driver standings.

Previous race: 1992 Peak Antifreeze 500	NASCAR Winston Cup Series; 1992 season	Next race: 1992 Tyson Holly Farms 400
