= 1992 Bud 500 =

20th race of the 1992 NASCAR Winston Cup Series

Race details
- Race 20 of 29 in the 1992 NASCAR Winston Cup Series
- The 1992 Bud 500 program cover, featuring Bill Elliott.
- Date: August 29, 1992
- Location: Bristol, Tennessee, Bristol International Speedway
- Course: Permanent racing facility
- Course length: 0.533 miles (0.858 km)
- Distance: 500 laps, 266.5 mi (428.89 km)
- Scheduled distance: 500 laps, 266.5 mi (428.89 km)
- Average speed: 91.198 miles per hour (146.769 km/h)
- Attendance: 64,870

Pole position
Driver	Ernie Irvan	Morgan-McClure Motorsports
- Time: 15.919

Most laps led
Driver	Darrell Waltrip	Darrell Waltrip Motorsports
- Laps: 247

Winner
No. 17	Darrell Waltrip	Darrell Waltrip Motorsports

Television in the United States
- Network: ESPN
- Announcers: Bob Jenkins, Ned Jarrett, Benny Parsons

Radio in the United States
- Radio: Motor Racing Network

The 1992 Bud 500 was the 20th stock car race of the 1992 NASCAR Winston Cup Series season and the 32nd iteration of the event. The race was held on Saturday, August 29, 1992, before an audience of 64,870 in Bristol, Tennessee, at Bristol Motor Speedway, a 0.533 miles (0.858 km) permanent oval-shaped racetrack. The race took the scheduled 500 laps to complete. At race's end, owner-driver Darrell Waltrip would dominate the late stages of the race to take his 83rd career NASCAR Winston Cup Series victory and his second victory of the season. To fill out the top three, Richard Childress Racing driver Dale Earnhardt and Hendrick Motorsports driver Ken Schrader would finish second and third, respectively.

== Background ==
The layout of Bristol International Speedway, the venue where the race was held.

The Bristol Motor Speedway, formerly known as Bristol International Raceway and Bristol Raceway, is a NASCAR short track venue located in Bristol, Tennessee. Constructed in 1960, it held its first NASCAR race on July 30, 1961. Despite its short length, Bristol is among the most popular tracks on the NASCAR schedule because of its distinct features, which include extraordinarily steep banking, an all concrete surface, two pit roads, and stadium-like seating. It has also been named one of the loudest NASCAR tracks.

=== Entry list ===
- (R) denotes rookie driver.

#	Driver	Team	Make
1	Rick Mast	Precision Products Racing	Oldsmobile
2	Rusty Wallace	Penske Racing South	Pontiac
3	Dale Earnhardt	Richard Childress Racing	Chevrolet
4	Ernie Irvan	Morgan–McClure Motorsports	Chevrolet
5	Ricky Rudd	Hendrick Motorsports	Chevrolet
6	Mark Martin	Roush Racing	Ford
7	Alan Kulwicki	AK Racing	Ford
8	Dick Trickle	Stavola Brothers Racing	Ford
10	Derrike Cope	Whitcomb Racing	Chevrolet
11	Bill Elliott	Junior Johnson & Associates	Ford
12	Hut Stricklin	Bobby Allison Motorsports	Chevrolet
15	Geoff Bodine	Bud Moore Engineering	Ford
16	Wally Dallenbach Jr.	Roush Racing	Ford
17	Darrell Waltrip	Darrell Waltrip Motorsports	Chevrolet
18	Dale Jarrett	Joe Gibbs Racing	Chevrolet
20	Jimmy Spencer	Moroso Racing	Ford
21	Morgan Shepherd	Wood Brothers Racing	Ford
22	Sterling Marlin	Junior Johnson & Associates	Ford
25	Ken Schrader	Hendrick Motorsports	Chevrolet
26	Brett Bodine	King Racing	Ford
28	Davey Allison	Robert Yates Racing	Ford
30	Michael Waltrip	Bahari Racing	Pontiac
33	Harry Gant	Leo Jackson Motorsports	Oldsmobile
41	Dick Trickle	Larry Hedrick Motorsports	Chevrolet
42	Kyle Petty	SABCO Racing	Pontiac
43	Richard Petty	Petty Enterprises	Pontiac
52	Jimmy Means	Jimmy Means Racing	Pontiac
55	Ted Musgrave	RaDiUs Motorsports	Oldsmobile
66	Jimmy Hensley (R)	Cale Yarborough Motorsports	Ford
68	Bobby Hamilton	TriStar Motorsports	Oldsmobile
71	Jim Sauter	Marcis Auto Racing	Chevrolet
94	Terry Labonte	Hagan Racing	Oldsmobile

== Qualifying ==
Qualifying was split into two rounds. The first round was held on Friday, August 28, at 7:35 PM EST. Each driver would have one lap to set a time. During the first round, the top 15 drivers in the round would be guaranteed a starting spot in the race. If a driver was not able to guarantee a spot in the first round, they had the option to scrub their time from the first round and try and run a faster lap time in a second round qualifying run, held on Saturday, August 29, at 1:00 PM EST. As with the first round, each driver would have one lap to set a time. For this specific race, positions 15-30 would be decided on time, and depending on who needed it, a select amount of positions were given to cars who had not otherwise qualified but were high enough in owner's points; up to two provisionals were given. If needed, a past champion who did not qualify on either time or provisionals could use a champion's provisional, adding one more spot to the field.

Ernie Irvan, driving for Morgan–McClure Motorsports, won the pole, setting a time of 15.919 and an average speed of 120.535 mph (193.982 km/h) in the first round.

No drivers would fail to qualify.

=== Full qualifying results ===
Pos.	#	Driver	Team	Make	Time	Speed
1	4	Ernie Irvan	Morgan–McClure Motorsports	Chevrolet	15.919	120.535
2	5	Ricky Rudd	Hendrick Motorsports	Chevrolet	16.038	119.641
3	26	Brett Bodine	King Racing	Ford	16.067	119.425
4	6	Mark Martin	Roush Racing	Ford	16.091	119.247
5	7	Alan Kulwicki	AK Racing	Ford	16.146	118.840
6	25	Ken Schrader	Hendrick Motorsports	Chevrolet	16.159	118.745
7	28	Davey Allison	Robert Yates Racing	Ford	16.167	118.686
8	2	Rusty Wallace	Penske Racing South	Pontiac	16.174	118.635
9	17	Darrell Waltrip	Darrell Waltrip Motorsports	Chevrolet	16.194	118.488
10	8	Dick Trickle	Stavola Brothers Racing	Ford	16.217	118.320
11	15	Geoff Bodine	Bud Moore Engineering	Ford	16.246	118.109
12	66	Jimmy Hensley (R)	Cale Yarborough Motorsports	Ford	16.261	118.000
13	12	Hut Stricklin	Bobby Allison Motorsports	Chevrolet	16.280	117.862
14	18	Dale Jarrett	Joe Gibbs Racing	Chevrolet	16.288	117.805
15	21	Morgan Shepherd	Wood Brothers Racing	Ford	16.303	117.696
Failed to lock in Round 1
16	33	Harry Gant	Leo Jackson Motorsports	Oldsmobile	-*	-*
17	10	Derrike Cope	Whitcomb Racing	Chevrolet	-*	-*
18	94	Terry Labonte	Hagan Racing	Oldsmobile	-*	-*
19	11	Bill Elliott	Junior Johnson & Associates	Ford	-*	-*
20	41	Dave Marcis	Larry Hedrick Motorsports	Chevrolet	-*	-*
21	16	Wally Dallenbach Jr.	Roush Racing	Ford	-*	-*
22	30	Michael Waltrip	Bahari Racing	Pontiac	-*	-*
23	3	Dale Earnhardt	Richard Childress Racing	Chevrolet	-*	-*
24	1	Rick Mast	Precision Products Racing	Oldsmobile	-*	-*
25	55	Ted Musgrave	RaDiUs Motorsports	Ford	-*	-*
26	42	Kyle Petty	SABCO Racing	Pontiac	-*	-*
27	22	Sterling Marlin	Junior Johnson & Associates	Ford	-*	-*
28	68	Bobby Hamilton	TriStar Motorsports	Oldsmobile	-*	-*
29	20	Jimmy Spencer	Moroso Racing	Ford	-*	-*
30	43	Richard Petty	Petty Enterprises	Pontiac	-*	-*
Provisionals
31	71	Jim Sauter	Marcis Auto Racing	Chevrolet	-*	-*
32	52	Jimmy Means	Jimmy Means Racing	Pontiac	-*	-*
Official first round qualifying results

== Race results ==
Fin	St	#	Driver	Team	Make	Laps	Led	Status	Pts	Winnings
1	9	17	Darrell Waltrip	Darrell Waltrip Motorsports	Chevrolet	500	247	running	185	$73,050
2	23	3	Dale Earnhardt	Richard Childress Racing	Chevrolet	500	0	running	170	$39,325
3	6	25	Ken Schrader	Hendrick Motorsports	Chevrolet	500	0	running	165	$28,350
4	26	42	Kyle Petty	SABCO Racing	Pontiac	500	0	running	160	$18,000
5	5	7	Alan Kulwicki	AK Racing	Ford	499	3	running	160	$19,800
6	19	11	Bill Elliott	Junior Johnson & Associates	Ford	499	0	running	150	$18,075
7	12	66	Jimmy Hensley (R)	Cale Yarborough Motorsports	Ford	499	0	running	146	$11,775
8	2	5	Ricky Rudd	Hendrick Motorsports	Chevrolet	499	139	running	147	$16,875
9	3	26	Brett Bodine	King Racing	Ford	499	35	running	143	$14,225
10	8	2	Rusty Wallace	Penske Racing South	Pontiac	498	0	running	134	$14,575
11	11	15	Geoff Bodine	Bud Moore Engineering	Ford	497	0	running	130	$14,425
12	17	10	Derrike Cope	Whitcomb Racing	Chevrolet	497	0	running	127	$9,115
13	15	21	Morgan Shepherd	Wood Brothers Racing	Ford	497	0	running	124	$11,775
14	22	30	Michael Waltrip	Bahari Racing	Pontiac	497	0	running	121	$11,525
15	27	22	Sterling Marlin	Junior Johnson & Associates	Ford	495	0	running	118	$11,325
16	30	43	Richard Petty	Petty Enterprises	Pontiac	493	0	running	115	$10,775
17	14	18	Dale Jarrett	Joe Gibbs Racing	Chevrolet	492	0	running	112	$10,525
18	31	71	Jim Sauter	Marcis Auto Racing	Chevrolet	491	0	running	109	$7,375
19	21	16	Wally Dallenbach Jr.	Roush Racing	Ford	489	0	running	106	$5,465
20	29	20	Jimmy Spencer	Moroso Racing	Ford	487	0	running	103	$6,125
21	28	68	Bobby Hamilton	TriStar Motorsports	Oldsmobile	484	0	running	100	$11,075
22	25	55	Ted Musgrave	RaDiUs Motorsports	Ford	476	0	running	97	$9,925
23	10	8	Dick Trickle	Stavola Brothers Racing	Ford	446	0	running	94	$6,775
24	32	52	Jimmy Means	Jimmy Means Racing	Pontiac	395	0	running	91	$6,650
25	4	6	Mark Martin	Roush Racing	Ford	385	23	crash	93	$13,605
26	16	33	Harry Gant	Leo Jackson Motorsports	Oldsmobile	349	35	crash	90	$15,475
27	13	12	Hut Stricklin	Bobby Allison Motorsports	Chevrolet	339	0	crash	82	$9,525
28	1	4	Ernie Irvan	Morgan–McClure Motorsports	Chevrolet	285	7	crash	84	$17,000
29	24	1	Rick Mast	Precision Products Racing	Oldsmobile	276	0	crash	76	$9,425
30	7	28	Davey Allison	Robert Yates Racing	Ford	262	11	crash	78	$16,025
31	18	94	Terry Labonte	Hagan Racing	Oldsmobile	125	0	engine	70	$9,350
32	20	41	Dave Marcis	Larry Hedrick Motorsports	Chevrolet	101	0	crash	67	$6,325
Official race results

== Standings after the race ==
Drivers' Championship standings

	Pos	Driver	Points
	1	Bill Elliott	2,946
	2	Davey Allison	2,837 (-109)
1	3	Alan Kulwicki	2,813 (-133)
1	4	Harry Gant	2,751 (–195)
	5	Mark Martin	2,604 (–342)
3	6	Kyle Petty	2,591 (–355)
4	7	Dale Earnhardt	2,570 (–376)
	8	Morgan Shepherd	2,539 (–407)
2	9	Ricky Rudd	2,528 (–418)
3	10	Darrell Waltrip	2,523 (–423)
Official driver's standings

- Note: Only the first 10 positions are included for the driver standings.

Previous race: 1992 Champion Spark Plug 400	NASCAR Winston Cup Series; 1992 season	Next race: 1992 Mountain Dew Southern 500
