= 1992 Champion Spark Plug 400 =

19th race of the 1992 NASCAR Winston Cup Series

Race details
- Race 19 of 29 in the 1992 NASCAR Winston Cup Series
- The 1992 Champion Spark Plug 400 program cover, featuring Richard Petty. Artwork by NASCAR artist Sam Bass.
- Date: August 16, 1992
- Official name: 23rd Annual Champion Spark Plug 400
- Location: Brooklyn, Michigan, Michigan International Speedway
- Course: Permanent racing facility
- Course length: 2 miles (3.2 km)
- Distance: 200 laps, 400 mi (643.737 km)
- Average speed: 146.056 miles per hour (235.054 km/h)
- Attendance: 95,000

Pole position
Driver	Alan Kulwicki	AK Racing
- Time: 40.405

Most laps led
Driver	Bill Elliott	Junior Johnson & Associates
- Laps: 72

Winner
No. 33	Harry Gant	Leo Jackson Motorsports

Television in the United States
- Network: ESPN
- Announcers: Bob Jenkins, Ned Jarrett, Benny Parsons

Radio in the United States
- Radio: Motor Racing Network

The 1992 Champion Spark Plug 400 was the 19th stock car race of the 1992 NASCAR Winston Cup Series season and the 23rd iteration of the event. The race was held on Sunday, August 16, 1992, before an audience of 95,000 in Brooklyn, Michigan, at Michigan International Speedway, a two-mile (3.2 km) moderate-banked D-shaped speedway. The race took the scheduled 200 laps to complete. Depending on fuel mileage, Leo Jackson Motorsports driver Harry Gant would manage to run the final 51 laps on one tank of fuel to take his 18th and final NASCAR Winston Cup Series victory and his second and final victory of the season. To fill out the top three, owner-driver Darrell Waltrip and Junior Johnson & Associates driver Bill Elliott would finish second and third, respectively.

== Background ==
The layout of Michigan International Speedway, the venue where the race was held.

The race was held at Michigan International Speedway, a two-mile (3.2 km) moderate-banked D-shaped speedway located in Brooklyn, Michigan. The track is used primarily for NASCAR events. It is known as a "sister track" to Texas World Speedway as MIS's oval design was a direct basis of TWS, with moderate modifications to the banking in the corners, and was used as the basis of Auto Club Speedway. The track is owned by International Speedway Corporation. Michigan International Speedway is recognized as one of motorsports' premier facilities because of its wide racing surface and high banking (by open-wheel standards; the 18-degree banking is modest by stock car standards).

=== Entry list ===
- (R) denotes rookie driver.

#	Driver	Team	Make	Sponsor
1	Rick Mast	Precision Products Racing	Oldsmobile	Skoal
2	Rusty Wallace	Penske Racing South	Pontiac	Miller Genuine Draft
3	Dale Earnhardt	Richard Childress Racing	Chevrolet	GM Goodwrench Service Plus
4	Ernie Irvan	Morgan–McClure Motorsports	Chevrolet	Kodak
5	Ricky Rudd	Hendrick Motorsports	Chevrolet	Tide
6	Mark Martin	Roush Racing	Ford	Valvoline
7	Alan Kulwicki	AK Racing	Ford	Hooters
8	Dick Trickle	Stavola Brothers Racing	Ford	Snickers
9	Chad Little	Melling Racing	Ford	National Child Abuse Hotline
10	Derrike Cope	Whitcomb Racing	Chevrolet	Purolator Filters
11	Bill Elliott	Junior Johnson & Associates	Ford	Budweiser
12	Hut Stricklin	Bobby Allison Motorsports	Chevrolet	Raybestos
13	Stan Fox	Folsom Racing	Chevrolet	Carrier "We're The Inside Guys."
15	Geoff Bodine	Bud Moore Engineering	Ford	Motorcraft
16	Wally Dallenbach Jr.	Roush Racing	Ford	Keystone
17	Darrell Waltrip	Darrell Waltrip Motorsports	Chevrolet	Western Auto
18	Dale Jarrett	Joe Gibbs Racing	Chevrolet	Interstate Batteries
21	Morgan Shepherd	Wood Brothers Racing	Ford	Citgo
22	Sterling Marlin	Junior Johnson & Associates	Ford	Maxwell House
23	Eddie Bierschwale	B&B Racing	Oldsmobile	SplitFire
25	Ken Schrader	Hendrick Motorsports	Chevrolet	Kodiak
26	Brett Bodine	King Racing	Ford	Quaker State
27	Jeff McClure	Linro Motorsports	Chevrolet	Showcase Racing Collectibles
28	Davey Allison	Robert Yates Racing	Ford	Texaco, Havoline
30	Michael Waltrip	Bahari Racing	Pontiac	Pennzoil
31	Bobby Hillin Jr.	Team Ireland	Chevrolet	Team Ireland
32	Jimmy Horton	Active Motorsports	Chevrolet	Active Trucking
33	Harry Gant	Leo Jackson Motorsports	Oldsmobile	Skoal Bandit
41	Greg Sacks	Larry Hedrick Motorsports	Chevrolet	Kellogg's Frosted Flakes
42	Kyle Petty	SABCO Racing	Pontiac	Mello Yello
43	Richard Petty	Petty Enterprises	Pontiac	STP
49	Stanley Smith	BS&S Motorsports	Chevrolet	Ameritron Batteries
51	Jeff Purvis	Phoenix Racing	Chevrolet	Phoenix Construction
52	Jimmy Means	Jimmy Means Racing	Pontiac	Jimmy Means Racing
55	Ted Musgrave	RaDiUs Motorsports	Chevrolet	Jasper Engines & Transmissions
66	Jimmy Hensley (R)	Cale Yarborough Motorsports	Ford	Phillips 66 TropArtic
68	Bobby Hamilton	TriStar Motorsports	Chevrolet	Country Time
71	Dave Marcis	Marcis Auto Racing	Chevrolet	Transmissions Unlimited
77	Mike Potter	Balough Racing	Chevrolet	Kenova Golf Course Construction
83	Lake Speed	Speed Racing	Ford	Purex
94	Terry Labonte	Hagan Racing	Ford	Sunoco

== Qualifying ==
Qualifying was split into two rounds. The first round was held on Thursday, August 14, at 3:30 PM EST. Each driver would have one lap to set a time. During the first round, the top 20 drivers in the round would be guaranteed a starting spot in the race. If a driver was not able to guarantee a spot in the first round, they had the option to scrub their time from the first round and try and run a faster lap time in a second round qualifying run, held on Saturday, August 15, at 10:30 AM EST. As with the first round, each driver would have one lap to set a time. For this specific race, positions 21-40 would be decided on time, and depending on who needed it, a select amount of positions were given to cars who had not otherwise qualified but were high enough in owner's points; up to two were given. If needed, a past champion who did not qualify on either time or provisionals could use a champion's provisional, adding one more spot to the field.

Alan Kulwicki, driving for his own AK Racing team, would win the pole, setting a time of 40.405 and an average speed of 178.196 miles per hour (286.779 km/h) in the first round.

No drivers would fail to qualify.

=== Full qualifying results ===
Pos.	#	Driver	Team	Make	Time	Speed
1	7	Alan Kulwicki	AK Racing	Ford	40.405	178.196
2	6	Mark Martin	Roush Racing	Ford	40.406	178.191
3	28	Davey Allison	Robert Yates Racing	Ford	40.424	178.112
4	25	Ken Schrader	Hendrick Motorsports	Chevrolet	40.471	177.905
5	4	Ernie Irvan	Morgan–McClure Motorsports	Chevrolet	40.479	177.870
6	21	Morgan Shepherd	Wood Brothers Racing	Ford	40.532	177.637
7	11	Bill Elliott	Junior Johnson & Associates	Ford	40.593	177.370
8	22	Sterling Marlin	Junior Johnson & Associates	Ford	40.653	177.109
9	17	Darrell Waltrip	Darrell Waltrip Motorsports	Chevrolet	40.676	177.009
10	26	Brett Bodine	King Racing	Ford	40.696	176.922
11	5	Ricky Rudd	Hendrick Motorsports	Chevrolet	40.707	176.874
12	15	Geoff Bodine	Bud Moore Engineering	Ford	40.766	176.618
13	94	Terry Labonte	Hagan Racing	Oldsmobile	40.781	176.553
14	18	Dale Jarrett	Joe Gibbs Racing	Chevrolet	40.790	176.514
15	42	Kyle Petty	SABCO Racing	Pontiac	40.794	176.497
16	68	Bobby Hamilton	TriStar Motorsports	Ford	40.806	176.445
17	10	Derrike Cope	Whitcomb Racing	Chevrolet	40.875	176.147
18	8	Dick Trickle	Stavola Brothers Racing	Ford	40.906	176.013
19	66	Jimmy Hensley (R)	Cale Yarborough Motorsports	Ford	40.973	175.725
20	12	Hut Stricklin	Bobby Allison Motorsports	Chevrolet	41.005	175.588
Failed to lock in Round 1
21	43	Richard Petty	Petty Enterprises	Pontiac	41.111	175.136
22	32	Jimmy Horton	Active Motorsports	Chevrolet	41.116	175.114
23	49	Stanley Smith	BS&S Motorsports	Chevrolet	41.141	175.008
24	33	Harry Gant	Leo Jackson Motorsports	Oldsmobile	41.164	174.910
25	41	Greg Sacks	Larry Hedrick Motorsports	Chevrolet	41.187	174.812
26	30	Michael Waltrip	Bahari Racing	Pontiac	41.214	174.698
27	16	Wally Dallenbach Jr.	Roush Racing	Ford	41.262	174.495
28	1	Rick Mast	Precision Products Racing	Oldsmobile	41.269	174.465
29	71	Dave Marcis	Marcis Auto Racing	Chevrolet	41.270	174.461
30	31	Bobby Hillin Jr.	Team Ireland	Chevrolet	41.306	174.309
31	9	Chad Little	Melling Racing	Ford	41.371	174.035
32	23	Eddie Bierschwale	B&B Racing	Oldsmobile	41.397	173.926
33	2	Rusty Wallace	Penske Racing South	Pontiac	41.495	173.515
34	83	Lake Speed	Speed Racing	Ford	41.516	173.427
35	55	Ted Musgrave	RaDiUs Motorsports	Ford	41.806	172.224
36	51	Jeff Purvis	Phoenix Racing	Chevrolet	41.902	171.830
37	52	Jimmy Means	Jimmy Means Racing	Pontiac	42.276	170.309
38	13	Stan Fox	Folsom Racing	Chevrolet	42.495	169.432
39	27	Jeff McClure	Linro Motorsports	Chevrolet	42.597	169.026
40	77	Mike Potter	Balough Racing	Chevrolet	42.715	168.559
Provisional
41	3	Dale Earnhardt	Richard Childress Racing	Chevrolet	-	-
Official first round qualifying results
Official starting lineup

== Race results ==
Fin	St	#	Driver	Team	Make	Laps	Led	Status	Pts	Winnings
1	24	33	Harry Gant	Leo Jackson Motorsports	Oldsmobile	200	23	running	180	$71,545
2	9	17	Darrell Waltrip	Darrell Waltrip Motorsports	Chevrolet	200	6	running	175	$45,670
3	7	11	Bill Elliott	Junior Johnson & Associates	Ford	200	72	running	175	$45,820
4	5	4	Ernie Irvan	Morgan–McClure Motorsports	Chevrolet	200	35	running	165	$28,920
5	3	28	Davey Allison	Robert Yates Racing	Ford	200	0	running	155	$29,265
6	15	42	Kyle Petty	SABCO Racing	Pontiac	200	0	running	150	$21,715
7	8	22	Sterling Marlin	Junior Johnson & Associates	Ford	200	0	running	146	$19,515
8	14	18	Dale Jarrett	Joe Gibbs Racing	Chevrolet	200	4	running	147	$18,265
9	2	6	Mark Martin	Roush Racing	Ford	200	7	running	143	$19,715
10	6	21	Morgan Shepherd	Wood Brothers Racing	Ford	200	0	running	134	$18,765
11	4	25	Ken Schrader	Hendrick Motorsports	Chevrolet	200	0	running	130	$19,240
12	10	26	Brett Bodine	King Racing	Ford	200	7	running	132	$16,615
13	28	1	Rick Mast	Precision Products Racing	Oldsmobile	199	0	running	124	$15,115
14	1	7	Alan Kulwicki	AK Racing	Ford	199	46	running	126	$19,915
15	16	68	Bobby Hamilton	TriStar Motorsports	Ford	199	0	running	118	$14,415
16	41	3	Dale Earnhardt	Richard Childress Racing	Chevrolet	199	0	running	115	$19,665
17	31	9	Chad Little	Melling Racing	Ford	199	0	running	112	$7,865
18	21	43	Richard Petty	Petty Enterprises	Pontiac	199	0	running	109	$13,165
19	18	8	Dick Trickle	Stavola Brothers Racing	Ford	199	0	running	106	$9,665
20	27	16	Wally Dallenbach Jr.	Roush Racing	Ford	199	0	running	103	$7,965
21	33	2	Rusty Wallace	Penske Racing South	Pontiac	198	0	running	100	$15,040
22	26	30	Michael Waltrip	Bahari Racing	Pontiac	198	0	running	97	$11,940
23	13	94	Terry Labonte	Hagan Racing	Oldsmobile	198	0	running	94	$11,740
24	20	12	Hut Stricklin	Bobby Allison Motorsports	Chevrolet	198	0	running	91	$11,590
25	35	55	Ted Musgrave	RaDiUs Motorsports	Ford	197	0	running	88	$11,340
26	30	31	Bobby Hillin Jr.	Team Ireland	Chevrolet	197	0	running	85	$6,390
27	36	51	Jeff Purvis	Phoenix Racing	Chevrolet	197	0	running	82	$6,340
28	32	23	Eddie Bierschwale	B&B Racing	Oldsmobile	193	0	running	79	$6,290
29	19	66	Jimmy Hensley (R)	Cale Yarborough Motorsports	Ford	191	0	running	76	$8,590
30	40	77	Mike Potter	Balough Racing	Chevrolet	175	0	running	73	$6,140
31	39	27	Jeff McClure	Linro Motorsports	Chevrolet	173	0	running	70	$5,990
32	29	71	Dave Marcis	Marcis Auto Racing	Chevrolet	101	0	engine	67	$7,540
33	17	10	Derrike Cope	Whitcomb Racing	Chevrolet	96	0	crash	64	$7,465
34	34	83	Lake Speed	Speed Racing	Ford	87	0	crash	61	$6,840
35	23	49	Stanley Smith	BS&S Motorsports	Chevrolet	61	0	crash	58	$5,790
36	11	5	Ricky Rudd	Hendrick Motorsports	Chevrolet	55	0	crash	55	$13,765
37	38	13	Stan Fox	Folsom Racing	Chevrolet	44	0	crash	52	$5,740
38	22	32	Jimmy Horton	Active Motorsports	Chevrolet	21	0	engine	49	$5,715
39	37	52	Jimmy Means	Jimmy Means Racing	Pontiac	8	0	engine	46	$7,240
40	12	15	Geoff Bodine	Bud Moore Engineering	Ford	4	0	crash	43	$10,165
41	25	41	Greg Sacks	Larry Hedrick Motorsports	Chevrolet	4	0	crash	40	$7,140
Official race results

== Standings after the race ==
Drivers' Championship standings

	Pos	Driver	Points
	1	Bill Elliott	2,796
	2	Davey Allison	2,759 (-37)
1	3	Harry Gant	2,661 (-135)
1	4	Alan Kulwicki	2,653 (–143)
	5	Mark Martin	2,511 (–285)
3	6	Kyle Petty	2,431 (–365)
4	7	Ernie Irvan	2,429 (–367)
2	8	Morgan Shepherd	2,415 (–381)
2	9	Terry Labonte	2,401 (–395)
2	10	Dale Earnhardt	2,400 (–396)
Official driver's standings

- Note: Only the first 10 positions are included for the driver standings.

Previous race: 1992 Budweiser at The Glen	NASCAR Winston Cup Series; 1992 season	Next race: 1992 Bud 500
