= Jim Sauter =

American racing driver (1943–2014)

- Born: June 1, 1943; Necedah, Wisconsin, U.S.
- Died: October 31, 2014 (aged 71)
- Achievements: 1981 ARTGO Challenge Series Champion; 1982 ARTGO Challenge Series Champion; 1983 All American 400 winner 1980 National Short Track Championship winner

NASCAR Cup Series career
- 76 races run over 14 years
- Best finish: 33rd (1989)
- First race: 1980 National 500 (Charlotte)
- Last race: 1996 Goody's Headache Powder 500 (Bristol)
Wins	Top tens	Poles
0	4	0

NASCAR O'Reilly Auto Parts Series career
- 4 races run over 4 years
- Best finish: 80th (1996)
- First race: 1989 Ames/Peak 200 (Dover)
- Last race: 2002 GNC Live Well 250 (Milwaukee)
Wins	Top tens	Poles
0	0	0

NASCAR FedEx Freight Truck Series career
- 2 races run over 2 years
- Best finish: 81st (1999)
- First race: 1999 goracing.com 200 (Michigan)
- Last race: 2004 Black Cat Fireworks 200 (Milwaukee)
Wins	Top tens	Poles
0	1	0

James Sauter (June 1, 1943 – October 31, 2014) was an American stock car racing driver from Necedah, Wisconsin. He formerly raced in all three of NASCAR's national series, and is best known for having been a test driver for the International Race of Champions, as well as winning two championships in the Midwest-based ARTGO Challenge Series.

== Racing career ==
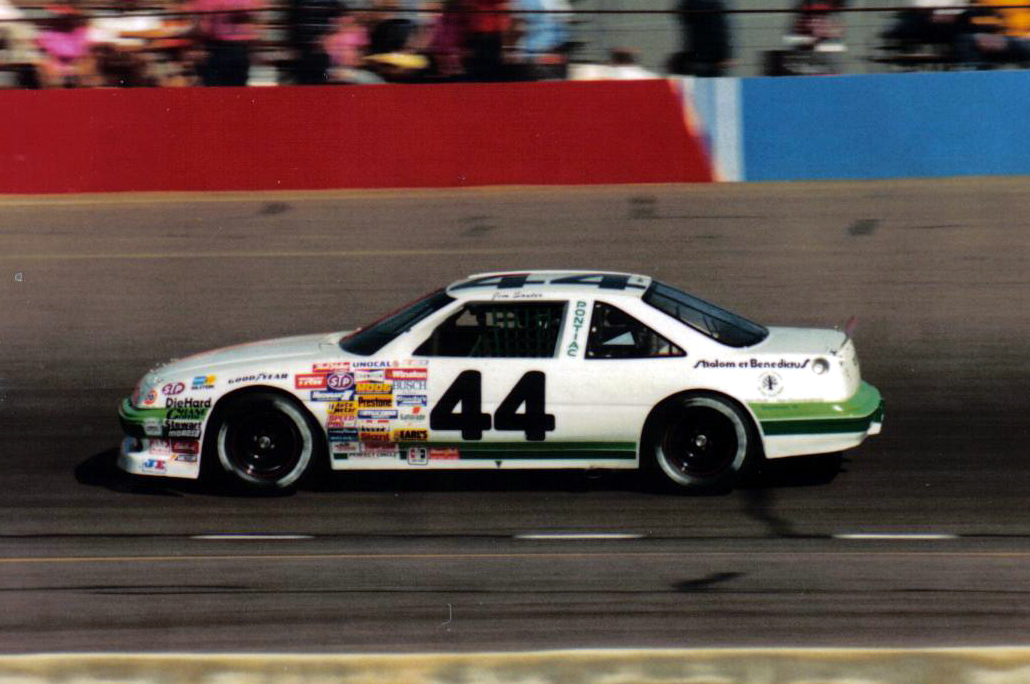
Sauter's 1989 Winston Cup car

Sauter started racing in 1964 in a modified at Raceway Park in Savage, Minnesota. He moved up to late models the following year. Sauter moved to Wisconsin. He won the first race at the LaCrosse Interstate Fairgrounds (now LaCrosse Fairgrounds Speedway) on July 14, 1970. His career took off after he won the North Star 500 at the Minnesota State Fair in a Dave Marcis Chevelle. Sauter said "The funny thing about that race was the fact that we had a barn full of various brands of tires that we wanted to use up and ended up with Goodyear on the outside and Firestone on the inside for no other reason than that. Everyone thought it must be the hot tip." Marcis called Sauter in 1978 and asked him to drive his racecar in the ARCA 200. Sauter battled Bruce Hill for the win on the last lap. They crashed, with Hill ending his race along the wall and Sauter won.

Sauter raced part time in the NASCAR Winston Cup Series in the 1980s and 1990s, posting four top-ten finishes in 76 starts. He said his biggest thrill was leading the 1982 Daytona 500. He was an independent (non-factory) driver with limited funds. To help pay the bills, Sauter did Goodyear tire tests along with Marcis.

Sauter raced primarily in the ARTGO and ASA series. Sauter returned to Wisconsin to win the 1981 track championship at Wisconsin International Raceway. Sauter won the 1981 and 1982 ARTGO championships with sixteen of twenty career victories in those years (seven in 1981 and nine in 1982). Sauter won several major regional races including the 1980 National Short Track Championship at Rockford Speedway and the 1983 All American 400 at Nashville Fairgrounds Speedway. He also competed at the Slinger Nationals, Snowball Derby, Winchester 400 and the World Crown.

== Head of racing family ==
His sons Tim, Jay, and Johnny have followed his footsteps by racing on the NASCAR circuit. His other son Jim, Jr. has raced on regional events along with his grandson Travis Sauter. Sauter raced in his final NASCAR Nationwide Series at the Milwaukee Mile racing against Tim, Jay and Johnny in 2002, the only time in NASCAR history where a father raced against three of his sons. None of Sauter's seven daughters nor his son Joe are involved in racing.

Sauter and rival Joe Shear are connected in another way; Shear's eponymous son became son Johnny's crew chief in the NASCAR Gander Outdoors Truck Series, winning Daytona and the series championship.

== IROC involvement ==
Sauter was also well known for preparing the setups and testing International Race of Champions (IROC) cars with Dick Trickle and Dave Marcis.

== Death ==
Sauter died following a brief illness on October 31, 2014. He was 71 years old.

== Motorsports career results ==
=== Racing record ===
Season	Series	Team name	No.	Races	Wins	Poles	Top tens	Final placing
1969	USAC Stock Car	-	-	1	0	0	0	-
1970	Late model stock car	-	-	5	2	0	4	-
1971	Late model stock car	-	-	1	0	0	0	-
1972	Late model stock car	-	5	17	0	0	13	-
1972	Red, White, and Blue State Championship Series	-	-	2+	0	0	2+	-
1973	Late model stock car	-	-	6	0	0	5	-
1974	Late model stock car	-	-	1	0	0	1	-
1974	Red, White, and Blue State Championship Series	-	-	2+	0	0	1+	-
1975	Late model stock car	-	-	1	1	0	1	-
1976	ARCA Racing Series	-	02	1+	0	0	0	-
1976	Red, White, and Blue State Championship Series	-	-	1+	0	0	0	-
1976	Late model stock car	-	-	9	0	0	9	-
1977	NASCAR Late Model Sportsman Division	-	02	2	0	0	2	-
1977	ARCA Racing Series	Marcis Auto Racing	02	2+	0	0	2+	-
1977	USAC Stock Car	Larry Wehrs	02	2	0	0	2	-
1977	Late model stock car	-	-	3	0	0	3	-
1978	ARCA Racing Series	-	02	2+	1	1	2+	-
1978	USAC Stock Car	Sauter Racing	50/58	5	0	0	4	-
1979	NASCAR Late Model Sportsman Division	-	62	1	0	0	0	-
1979	ARTGO Challenge Series	-	-	1+	0	0	1+	-
1979	USAC Stock Car	Gene Wheeler	39	4	0	0	2	-
1980	NASCAR Winston Cup Series	RahMoc Enterprises	05	1	0	0	0	109th
1980	NASCAR Late Model Sportsman Division	-	62	1	0	0	0	-
1980	ASA National Tour	-	7/27	3	0	0	3	-
1980	ARTGO Challenge Series	-	-	21	1	0	20	**3rd**
1980	Red, White, and Blue State Championship Series	-	-	1+	0	0	1+	-
1981	ASA National Tour	-	17	4+	1	0	3+	-
1981	ARTGO Challenge Series	-	-	19+	7	0	18+	**1st**
1981	Red, White, and Blue State Championship Series	-	-	1+	0	0	0	-
1982	NASCAR Winston Cup Series	Jim Stacy	5	3	0	0	1	62nd
1982	ASA National Tour	Howe Racing	5	5	0	0	1	-
1982	All Pro Super Series	-	5	1+	0	0	1+	-
1982	ARTGO Challenge Series	-	-	15+	9	0	15+	**1st**
1982	Red, White, and Blue State Championship Series	-	-	2+	1	0	2+	3rd
1983	NASCAR Winston Cup Series	Ulrich Racing	6	0	0	0	0	68th
1983	ASA National Tour	Howe Racing	5	17	2	2	11	-
1983	All Pro Super Series	Howe Racing	5	3+	1	0	2+	-
1983	ARTGO Challenge Series	-	-	23+	1	0	15+	**3rd**
1983	Red, White, and Blue State Championship Series	-	-	2+	0	0	2+	-
1984	NASCAR Winston Cup Series	Ulrich Racing	6	3	0	0	0	88th
1984	NASCAR All-American Challenge Series	-	4	1+	0	0	1+	42nd
1984	ASA National Tour	Howe Racing	5	14+	4	1	10+	-
1984	All Pro SSuper Series	-	5	1	0	0	0	-
1984	ARTGO Challenge Series	-	-	9	2	1	6	5th
1985	NASCAR Winston Cup Series	Mueller Brothers	89	3	0	0	0	50th
1985	NASCAR All-American Challenge Series	-	29	1+	0	0	0	-
1985	ASA National Tour	Howe Racing	5	16	0	0	7	9th
1985	All Pro Super Series	-	15	1+	0	0	0	-
1986	NASCAR Winston Cup Series	RahMoc Enterprises	75	8	0	0	0	49th
1987	NASCAR Winston Cup Series	Mueller Brothers	89	3	0	0	1	54th
1988	NASCAR Winston Cup Series	Mueller Brothers	89	9	0	0	0	44th
1988	Red, White, and Blue State Championship Series	-	-	1+	0	0	1	-
1989	NASCAR Winston Cup Series	Bob Clark	31	3	0	0	2	33rd
1989	NASCAR Busch Series	John Pharo	33	1	0	0	0	104th
1989	Red, White, and Blue State Championship Series	-	-	2	2	0	2	3rd
1990	NASCAR Winston Cup Series	Dick Johnson	38	3	0	0	0	58th
1990	ARTGO Challenge Series	-	-	6	0	1	4	19th
1990	Red, White, and Blue State Championship Series	-	-	3+	0	0	3+	9th
1991	NASCAR Winston Cup Series	Mueller Brothers	89	6	0	0	0	43rd
1991	ARCA Racing Series	-	26	1	0	0	0	141st
1991	Red, White, and Blue State Championship Series	-	-	2+	1	0	2+	-
1992	NASCAR Winston Cup Series	Marcis Auto Racing	71	9	0	0	0	37th
1992	ARCA Racing Series	Roulo Brothers Racing	39	1	0	0	1	149th
1992	ASA National Tour	-	20	1+	0	0	0	-
1992	Red, White, and Blue State Championship Series	-	-	2+	1	0	2+	-
1993	NASCAR Winston Cup Series	Mueller Brothers	89	4	0	0	0	47th
1993	NASCAR All Pro Series	-	-	1+	0	0	0	-
1993	ARCA Racing Series	Roulo Brothers Racing	39	1	0	0	0	131st
1993	ARTGO Challenge Series	-	-	2	0	0	0	-
1993	Red, White, and Blue State Championship Series	-	-	1+	0	0	1+	-
1996	NASCAR Winston Cup Series	Team SABCO	42	2	0	0	0	52nd
1996	NASCAR Busch Series	Bown Racing	51	1	0	0	0	80th
1997	NASCAR Busch Series	Shoemaker Racing	64	1	0	0	0	86th
1999	NASCAR Craftsman Truck Series	Richard Childress Racing	8	1	0	0	1	81st
2002	NASCAR Busch Series	Richard Childress Racing	29	1	0	0	0	107th
2002	Midwest AllStar Racing Series	-	5S	1	0	0	0	-
2004	NASCAR Craftsman Truck Series	Curb Agajanian Performance Group	43	1	0	0	0	83rd

=== NASCAR ===
(key) (Bold – Pole position awarded by qualifying time. Italics – Pole position earned by points standings or practice time. * – Most laps led.)

==== Winston Cup Series ====
NASCAR Winston Cup Series results
Year	Team	No.	Make	1	2	3	4	5	6	7	8	9	10	11	12	13	14	15	16	17	18	19	20	21	22	23	24	25	26	27	28	29	30	31	32	33	34	35	36	NWCC	Pts	Ref
1980	RahMoc Enterprises	05	Chevy	RSD	DAY	RCH	CAR	ATL	BRI	DAR	NWS	MAR	TAL	NSV	DOV	CLT	TWS	RSD	MCH	DAY	NSV	POC	TAL	MCH	BRI	DAR	RCH	DOV	NWS	MAR	CLT; 41	CAR	ATL	ONT						109th	40	
1982	Jim Stacy Racing	5	Buick	DAY; 12	RCH	BRI	ATL; 10	CAR	DAR; 33	NWS	MAR	TAL	NSV	DOV	CLT	POC	RSD	MCH	DAY	NSV	POC	TAL	MCH	BRI	DAR	RCH	DOV	NWS	CLT	MAR	CAR	ATL	RSD							62nd	-	
1983	Ulrich Racing	6	Chevy	DAY; 18			ATL; 29	DAR	NWS	MAR	TAL	NSV	DOV	BRI	CLT	RSD	POC	MCH	DAY	NSV	POC	TAL	MCH	BRI	DAR	RCH	DOV	MAR	NWS											68th	-	
1983	Ulrich Racing	6	Buick		RCH; 19	CAR; 26																																		68th	-	
1983	Reeder Racing	02	Chevy																											CLT; 21	CAR	ATL	RSD							68th	-	
1984	U.S. Racing	6	Chevy	DAY; DNQ	RCH	CAR	ATL; 17	BRI	NWS	DAR	MAR	TAL; 37	NSV	DOV	CLT; 20	RSD	POC	MCH	DAY	NSV	POC	TAL	MCH	BRI	DAR	RCH	DOV	MAR	CLT	NWS	CAR	ATL	RSD							88th	-	
1985	Mueller Brothers Racing	89	Pontiac	DAY; 23	RCH	CAR	ATL	BRI	DAR	NWS	MAR	TAL	DOV	CLT; 31	RSD	POC	MCH; 20	DAY	POC	TAL	MCH	BRI	DAR	RCH	DOV	MAR	NWS	CLT	CAR	ATL; DNQ	RSD									50th	267	
1986	Mueller Brothers Racing	89	Pontiac	DAY; 25	RCH	CAR	ATL	BRI	DAR	NWS	MAR						MCH; 18																							49th	361	
1986	Ingle Racing	32	Chevy									TAL; 41	DOV	CLT	RSD	POC																								49th	361	
1986	U.S. Racing	6	Chevy															DAY; 23																						49th	361	
1986	RahMoc Enterprises	75	Pontiac																POC; 14	TAL; 12	GLN	MCH; 37	BRI	DAR; 13	RCH	DOV	MAR	NWS	CLT	CAR	ATL	RSD								49th	361	
1987	Mueller Brothers Racing	89	Pontiac	DAY; DNQ	CAR	RCH	ATL	DAR	NWS	BRI	MAR	TAL	CLT; 9	DOV	POC	RSD	MCH; 24	DAY	POC	TAL	GLN	MCH; 24	BRI	DAR	RCH	DOV	MAR	NWS	CLT; DNQ	CAR	RSD	ATL								54th	320	
1988	Mueller Brothers Racing	89	Pontiac	DAY; QL^{†}	RCH	CAR	ATL; 25	DAR	BRI	NWS	MAR	TAL	CLT; 39	DOV	RSD	POC	MCH	DAY	POC	TAL	GLN	MCH; 19	BRI					CLT; 13	NWS		PHO; 32									44th	463	
1988	Bob Clark Motorsports	31	Olds																					DAR; 23	RCH	DOV; 32	MAR			CAR; 17		ATL; 23								44th	463	
1989	Bob Clark Motorsports	31	Pontiac	DAY; DNQ	CAR; 10	ATL; 32	RCH; 36	DAR; 19	BRI; 13	NWS; 31	MAR; DNQ	TAL; 36	CLT; 37	DOV	SON	POC	MCH																							33rd	1510	
1989	Dingman Brothers Racing	50	Pontiac															DAY; 38																						33rd	1510	
1989	Group 44	44	Pontiac																POC; 16	TAL	GLN; 9	MCH; 23	BRI; DNQ	DAR	RCH	DOV; 12	MAR	CLT; 40	NWS	CAR; 33	PHO; 17	ATL; 21								33rd	1510	
1990	Group 44	44	Pontiac	DAY; DNQ	RCH	CAR	ATL	DAR	BRI	NWS	MAR	TAL	CLT	DOV	SON																									58th	222	
1990	Dick Johnson Racing	38	Ford													POC; 24	MCH	DAY	POC	TAL	GLN	MCH	BRI	DAR	RCH															58th	222	
1990	U.S. Racing	2	Pontiac																							DOV; 34	MAR	NWS	CLT	CAR	PHO									58th	222	
1990	H.L. Waters Racing	0	Ford																													ATL; 31								58th	222	
1991	Mueller Brothers Racing	89	Pontiac	DAY; 23	RCH	CAR	ATL; 22	DAR	BRI	NWS	MAR	TAL	CLT; 37	DOV	SON	POC	MCH; 37	DAY	POC	TAL	GLN; DNQ	MCH; 31	BRI	DAR	RCH	DOV	MAR	NWS; DNQ	CLT; DNQ	CAR	PHO; DNQ	ATL; 35								43rd	423	
1992	Mueller Brothers Racing	89	Pontiac	DAY; DNQ	CAR	RCH	ATL	DAR	BRI	NWS	MAR	TAL	CLT; 37	DOV	SON	POC	MCH; 39	DAY	POC	TAL	GLN	MCH																		37th	729	
1992	Marcis Auto Racing	71	Chevy																				BRI; 18	DAR; 36	RCH; 26	DOV; 18	MAR; 22	NWS; 29	CLT; 21	CAR	PHO	ATL								37th	729	
1993	Mueller Brothers Racing	89	Ford	DAY; 19	CAR	RCH	ATL	DAR	BRI	NWS	MAR	TAL	SON	CLT	DOV	POC		DAY; DNQ	NHA	POC	TAL	GLN	MCH; 36	BRI	DAR	RCH	DOV	MAR	NWS											47th	295	
1993	Roulo Brothers Racing	39	Chevy														MCH; 26																							47th	295	
1993	Mansion Motorsports	85	Ford																											CLT; 38	CAR	PHO	ATL							47th	295	
1994	Mueller Brothers Racing	89	Ford	DAY; DNQ	CAR	RCH	ATL; DNQ	DAR	BRI	NWS	MAR	TAL; DNQ	SON	CLT; DNQ	DOV	POC	MCH	DAY	NHA	POC	TAL																			NA	-	
1994	Dick Simon Racing	59	Ford																			IND; DNQ	GLN	MCH	BRI	DAR	RCH	DOV	MAR	NWS	CLT	CAR	PHO	ATL						NA	-	
1995	Marcis Auto Racing	72	Chevy	DAY; DNQ	CAR	RCH	ATL	DAR	BRI	NWS	MAR	TAL	SON	CLT	DOV	POC	MCH	DAY	NHA	POC	TAL	IND	GLN	MCH	BRI	DAR	RCH	DOV	MAR	NWS	CLT	CAR	PHO	ATL						NA	-	
1996	Marcis Auto Racing	72	Chevy	DAY; DNQ	CAR	RCH	ATL	DAR	BRI	NWS	MAR	TAL	SON	CLT	DOV	POC	MCH	DAY	NHA	POC	TAL	IND	GLN																	52nd	170	
1996	Team SABCO	42	Pontiac																					MCH; 21	BRI; 31	DAR	RCH	DOV	MAR	NWS	CLT	CAR	PHO	ATL						52nd	170	
1999	Marcis Auto Racing	72	Chevy	DAY; DNQ	CAR	LVS	ATL	DAR	TEX	BRI	MAR	TAL	CAL	RCH	CLT	DOV	MCH	POC	SON	DAY	NHA	POC	IND	GLN	MCH	BRI	DAR	RCH	NHA	DOV	MAR	CLT	TAL	CAR	PHO	HOM	ATL			NA	-	
2000	Marcis Auto Racing	72	Chevy	DAY; DNQ	CAR	LVS	ATL	DAR	BRI	TEX	MAR	TAL	CAL	RCH	CLT	DOV	MCH	POC	SON	DAY	NHA	POC	IND	GLN	MCH	BRI	DAR	RCH	NHA	DOV	MAR	CLT	TAL	CAR	PHO	HOM	ATL			NA	-	
2002	Marcis Auto Racing	71	Chevy	DAY	CAR	LVS	ATL	DAR	BRI	TEX	MAR	TAL	CAL	RCH	CLT	DOV	POC	MCH	SON	DAY	CHI	NHA	POC	IND; DNQ	GLN	MCH	BRI	DAR	RCH	NHA	DOV	KAN	TAL	CLT	MAR	ATL	CAR	PHO	HOM	NA	-	
2003	Marcis Auto Racing	71	Chevy	DAY	CAR	LVS	ATL	DAR	BRI	TEX	TAL	MAR	CAL	RCH	CLT	DOV	POC	MCH	SON	DAY	CHI	NHA	POC	IND; DNQ	GLN	MCH	BRI	DAR	RCH	NHA	DOV	TAL	KAN	CLT	MAR	ATL	PHO	CAR	HOM	NA	-	
^{†} - Qualified but replaced by Michael Waltrip

===== Daytona 500 =====
Year	Team	Manufacturer	Start	Finish
1982	Jim Stacy Racing	Buick	17	12
1983	Ulrich Racing	Chevrolet	20	18
1984	U.S. Racing	Chevrolet	DNQ	
1985	Mueller Brothers Racing	Pontiac	28	23
1986	Mueller Brothers Racing	Pontiac	27	25
1987	Mueller Brothers Racing	Pontiac	DNQ	
1988	Mueller Brothers Racing	Pontiac	QL^{†}	
1989	Bob Clark Motorsport	Pontiac	DNQ	
1990	Group 44	Pontiac	DNQ	
1991	Mueller Brothers Racing	Pontiac	21	23
1992	Mueller Brothers Racing	Pontiac	DNQ	
1993	Mueller Brothers Racing	Ford	39	19
1994	Mueller Brothers Racing	Ford	DNQ	
1995	Marcis Auto Racing	Chevrolet	DNQ	
1996	Marcis Auto Racing	Chevrolet	DNQ	
1999	Marcis Auto Racing	Chevrolet	DNQ	
2000	Marcis Auto Racing	Chevrolet	DNQ	
^{†} - Qualified but replaced by Michael Waltrip

==== Busch Series ====
NASCAR Busch Series results
Year	Team	No.	Make	1	2	3	4	5	6	7	8	9	10	11	12	13	14	15	16	17	18	19	20	21	22	23	24	25	26	27	28	29	30	31	32	33	34	NBGNC	Pts	Ref
1989	Pharo Racing	33	Olds	DAY	CAR	MAR	HCY	DAR	BRI	NZH	SBO	LAN	NSV	CLT	DOV	ROU	LVL	VOL	MYB	SBO	HCY	DUB	IRP	ROU	BRI	DAR	RCH	DOV; 26	MAR	CLT	CAR	MAR						104th	0	
1996	DAJ Racing	32	Ford	DAY	CAR	RCH	ATL	NSV	DAR	BRI	HCY	NZH	CLT	DOV	SBO	MYB	GLN	MLW; QL^{†}	NHA	TAL	IRP																	80th	115	
1996	Bown Racing	51	Chevy																			MCH; 16	BRI	DAR	RCH	DOV	CLT	CAR	HOM									80th	115	
1997	Shoemaker Racing	64	Chevy	DAY	CAR	RCH	ATL	LVS	DAR	HCY	TEX	BRI	NSV	TAL	NHA	NZH	CLT	DOV	SBO	GLN	MLW	MYB; 16	GTY	IRP	MCH	BRI	DAR	RCH	DOV	CLT	CAL	CAR	HOM					86th	115	
2002	Richard Childress Racing	29	Chevy	DAY	CAR	LVS	DAR	BRI	TEX	NSH	TAL	CAL	RCH	NHA	NZH	CLT	DOV	NSH	KEN	MLW; 29	DAY	CHI	GTY	PPR	IRP	MCH	BRI	DAR	RCH	DOV	KAN	CLT	MEM	ATL	CAR	PHO	HOM	107th	76	
^{†} - Qualified for Dale Jarrett

==== Craftsman Truck Series ====
NASCAR Craftsman Truck Series results
Year	Team	No.	Make	1	2	3	4	5	6	7	8	9	10	11	12	13	14	15	16	17	18	19	20	21	22	23	24	25	NCTC	Pts	Ref
1999	Richard Childress Racing	8	Chevy	HOM	PHO	EVG	MMR	MAR	MEM	PPR	I70	BRI	TEX	PIR	GLN	MLW	NSV	NZH	MCH; 10	NHA	IRP	GTY	HPT	RCH	LVS	LVL	TEX	CAL	81st	139	
2004	Curb-Agajanian Performance Group	43	Chevy	DAY	ATL	MAR	MFD	CLT	DOV	TEX	MEM	MLW; 13	KAN	KEN	GTW	MCH	IRP	NSH	BRI	RCH	NHA	LVS	CAL	TEX	MAR	PHO	DAR	HOM	83rd	124	

=== ARCA Hooters SuperCar Series ===
(key) (Bold – Pole position awarded by qualifying time. Italics – Pole position earned by points standings or practice time. * – Most laps led.)

ARCA Hooters SuperCar Series results
Year	Team	No.	Make	1	2	3	4	5	6	7	8	9	10	11	12	13	14	15	16	17	18	19	20	21	AHSSC	Pts	Ref
1976	Marcis Auto Racing	02	Dodge	SLM	DAY; 22	QCS	FMS	TAL	QCS	AVS	SLM	FRS	TOL	NSV	TOL	SLM									NA	0	
1977	Marcis Auto Racing	02	Dodge	TOL	DAY; 2*	QCS	BFS	NSV	FRS	TOL	SLM	AVS	TAL; 2	TOL	SND	SLM									NA	0	
1978	Marcis Auto Racing	02	Dodge	DAY; 1	QCS	AVS	NSV	IMS	LOR	FRS	**TAL**; 2	FRS	CMS	JEF											10th	390	
1981	Marcis Auto Racing		Chevy	DAY; DNQ	DSP	FRS	FRS	BFS	TAL	FRS	COR														NA	-	
1991	Roulo Brothers Racing	26	Chevy	DAY	ATL	KIL	TAL	TOL	FRS	POC	MCH	KIL	FRS	DEL	POC	TAL	HPT	MCH; 41	ISF	TOL	DSF	TWS	ATL		141st	-	
1992	Roulo Brothers Racing	39	Chevy	DAY	FIF	TWS	TAL	TOL	KIL	POC	MCH; 4	FRS	KIL	NSH	DEL	POC	HPT	FRS	ISF	TOL	DSF	TWS	SLM	ATL	149th	-	
1993	Roulo Brothers Racing	39	Chevy	DAY; 20	FIF	TWS	TAL	KIL	CMS	FRS	TOL	POC	MCH	FRS	POC	KIL	ISF	DSF	TOL	SLM	WIN	ATL			131st	-	

Sporting positions
Preceded by Dick Trickle	ARTGO Challenge Series Champion; 1981, 1982	Succeeded by Dick Trickle
