= Interstate Batteries =

Automotive battery company

- Type: Privately held company
- Founded: 1952
- Headquarters: Dallas, Texas, United States
- Key people: Lain Hancock, President & CEO
- Products: Automotive, marine/RV, mobility, lawn and garden batteries and more.
- Revenue: ▲US$1.5 billion (2013)
- Number of employees: 1,500 corporate employees (2013)
- Subsidiaries: Interstate All Battery Center
- Website: www.interstatebatteries.com

Interstate Battery System of America, Inc., doing business as Interstate Batteries, is a U.S. privately owned battery marketing and distribution company. It markets automotive batteries manufactured by Brookfield Business Partners, Exide Technologies, and others through independent distributors. The company is headquartered in Dallas, Texas, and it also markets marine/RV, mobility, motorcycle, lawn and garden, and other lines of batteries in the starting, lighting and ignition (SLI) markets. Interstate Batteries operates a distributor network that supplies batteries to over 200,000 dealers. They also have distributors in Bermuda, Bolivia, Canada, Costa Rica, the Dominican Republic, Guatemala, Guyana, Haiti, Honduras, Nicaragua and Panama. Additionally, they operate over 200 corporate and franchise owned retail stores.

== History ==
In the spring of 1950, John Searcy began selling and delivering car batteries to wholesalers in the Dallas/Fort Worth area from the back of his red Studebaker pickup truck. After two years, Searcy founded his new company, naming it Interstate Battery System after the new interstate highway system being built across the U.S.

In 1978, John Searcy retired and left the company under the leadership of President and Chairman Norm Miller. Norm Miller continued the company's expansion so that by the 1980s Interstate Battery had distributorships in all 50 US states and Canada. During that time they also created the Interstate Batteries Great American Race, which for 13 years took vintage car owners and their vehicles on a two-week, cross-country rally. This led to other marketing schemes such as advertising on the Paul Harvey news radio show, running national TV commercials, and sponsoring champion.

In 1990, Norm's brother Tommy Miller became Interstate Battery's president and CEO while Norm remained chairman of the board. As a result, Interstate Battery became heavily involved in NASCAR. Interstate Battery became title sponsor of coach Joe Gibbs' new Winston Cup team in 1992 which eventually won the Winston Cup Championship in 2000. In March 2004, Carlos Sepulveda became president and CEO and went on to lead the company for almost a decade until leaving in 2013 to join Triumph Bancorp Group.

Interstate Batteries has partnered with Universal Technical Institute (UTI) since 2018 to supply batteries exclusively for UTI’s training programs in automotive, diesel, and marine technology. This partnership ensures that students receive hands-on experience with leading industry equipment.

Since 2016, Interstate Batteries has recycled around 3.08 billion pounds of lead, keeping over 77 million car batteries out of landfills. This significant environmental effort is supported by Interstate's recycling team and its extensive network of distributors across North America. These distributors collect used batteries from dealers, ensuring they are recycled responsibly.

Norm Miller's son Scott became president and CEO in 2013. In February 2023, the company announced Lain Hancock as the new CEO and Scott as Executive Chairman of the Board.

The company states that its purpose is "[t]o glorify God and enrich lives as we deliver the most trustworthy source of power to the world."

== Motorsports ==
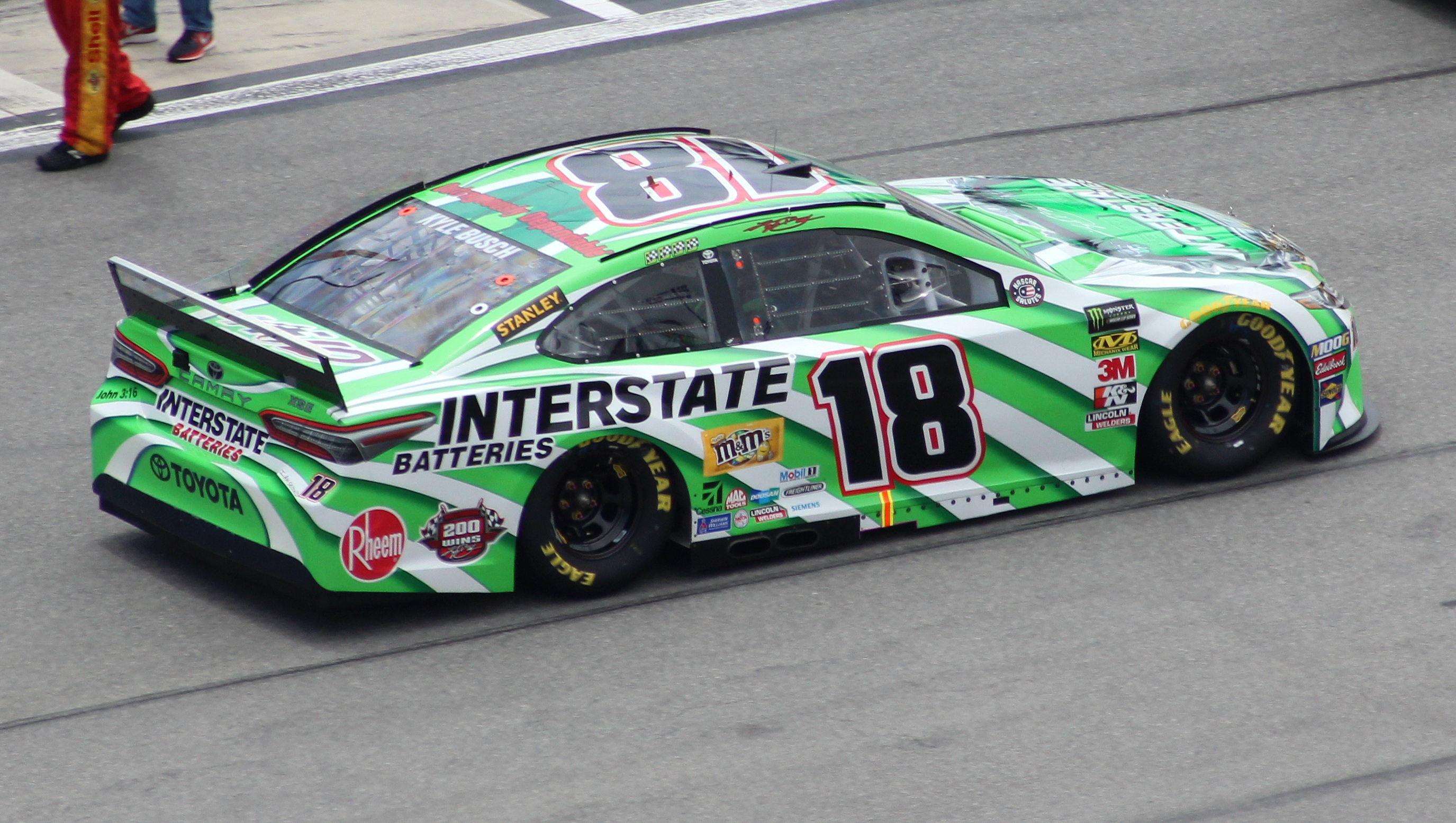
The Joe Gibbs Racing No. 18 Toyota Camry, sponsored by Interstate Batteries.

Interstate Batteries currently sponsors NASCAR drivers Christopher Bell and Ty Gibbs, and the Joe Gibbs Racing team. Other notable drivers include Kyle Busch, Bobby Labonte, Dale Jarrett, Matt Kenseth (as standby driver in 1999 at Darlington and as main driver in 2017 at Daytona the Clash race), and J. J. Yeley. In 2010, the company began sponsoring NHRA Pro Stock driver Mike Edwards.
