= Keystone (beer brand) =

American beer brand

Keystone beer is a product of the Molson Coors Beverage Company in Golden, Colorado. It was first introduced in Chico, California in September 1989. Keystone Ice was found in canned, kegged, and occasionally, bottled form, with 5.9% ABV. The Keystone Ice product lineup was permanently discontinued in 2021, but was later brought back in 2026. Keystone Light has a 4.13% ABV; roughly equal to other macro "light" brews, and is found primarily in cans, kegs and bottles. Keystone is a primary sponsor for Austin Cindric’s number 2 car in the NASCAR Cup Series.

== Varieties ==
Six varieties of Keystone have been produced, as well as the original:

- Keystone, introduced 1989, found with a gold can, red label, later changed to Keystone Premium
- Keystone Premium, found with a red, white and blue can
- Keystone Light, introduced 1989, found with a blue label
- Keystone Dry, introduced 1991, found with a black can, red label
- Keystone Ice, introduced 1994, "ice brewed ale," found with a black label.
- Keystone Amber Light, introduced 1994, found with a gold can with a diamond "Amber Light" badge
- Keystone V9, Puerto Rico only.
- Keystone Lime, introduced in Stauffer West during 2013.
- Keystone Light Keylightful, introduced March 1, 2020 in 40 US States. Raspberry - Lime
- Keystone Light Apple, introduced 2026, found with a red can.

The "Light" and "Ice" versions of the beer are far more prevalent and readily available for retail across the United States. Though Keystone Premium exists, it appears much less than its "Light" variety on liquor store shelves. "Dry" and "Amber Light" varieties were discontinued in the late 90s.

Recently, a new variety of Keystone, V9, has been introduced to Puerto Rico by a licensed distributor there, V. Suárez & Co. Inc., of Guaynabo, intended to be sold cheaply. The can is black with a blue "V9" and is labeled as 5.9% alc./vol.

In the province of Ontario (and most of Canada), Keystone Light is available in bottles, cans, and tall cans at 4.0% A.B.V. and featuring a 'near-discount' price.

== Nutrition information ==
Beer(per 12 oz)	Calories	Carbohydrates (g)	Protein (g)	Alcohol by volume(%)
Keystone	120	5.0	0.7	4.8
Keystone Premium	111	5.8	0.08	4.43
Keystone Light	101	4.7	0.7	4.13
Keystone Dry	123	unk	unk	4.9
Keystone Ice	145	6.9	1.2	5.9
Keystone Amber Light	110	unk	unk	3.5
Keystone V9	177	unk	unk	5.9
Keylightful	125	10.6	<1.0	4.1
Keystone Light Apple	131	12.1	<1.0	4.1

== Marketing ==
- The advertising slogan in 2007 for Keystone was "Always Smooth, Even When You're Not." The official slogan was formerly "All Stones Must Be Thrown", and it was marketed as "bottled beer taste in a can" (due, according to Coors, to their use of specially lined cans). Another slogan used for Keystone Light called it the "Never Bitter Beer", with commercials touting it as a remedy for "Bitter Beer Face".
- The commercial theme in the early 90s was "Wouldn't it be great if..." followed by beer-drinker fantasies, concluding with "and they served beer, really great beer like Keystone and Keystone Lite—bottled beer taste in a can."
- In promotion of Keystone Light, Coors Brewing Company has created a fictitious character named Keith Stone. Keith Stone has appeared in numerous television spots promoting Keystone Light, where he dials a phone with beef jerky. The advertisements involving Keith Stone have inspired many customers to make spoof advertisements for distribution on the Internet.
- In 2011, Coors Brewing Company, in promotion of its product Keystone Light, re-engineered its 30-pack cases to allow its purchasers to play a modified game of Cornhole, a popular lawn game. The brewer rebranded its boxes to promote the game of "Canhole".
- March 1, 2020 Launch of Keylightful Raspberry-Lime infused Keystone Light attempt to lure younger, legal age drinkers. Marketing launch will feature a Sun-glass wearing French bulldog clad in a "Hawaiian" style shirt. Mascot name is Lil' Breezy Keezy
