= Hagan Enterprises =

NASCAR auto racing organization

Hagan Racing
- Owner: Billy Hagan
- Series: Winston Cup
- Race drivers: Terry Labonte, Sterling Marlin, John Andretti, Joe Millikan, Skip Manning
- Manufacturer: Oldsmobile, Buick, Chevrolet, Ford
- Opened: 1969
- Closed: 1995

Career
- Debut: 1969 Talladega 500 (Talladega)
- Latest race: 1994 AC Delco 500 (Rockingham)
- Drivers' Championships: 1
- Race victories: 6

Hagan Enterprises (also known as Hagan Racing) was a NASCAR team that operated from 1969; 1975–1994. It was owned by owner/driver Billy Hagan. The team is best known for winning the 1984 NASCAR Winston Cup Series championship with Terry Labonte.

== History ==
Hagan made three starts in NASCAR's Grand National/Winston Cup division, finishing eighth in his first start, the inaugural Talladega 500 in a self-owned 1968 Mercury Cyclone. He did not field another car until 1975, finishing 19th once again at Talladega. He also fielded a car for five races for Skip Manning.

In 1976, he fielded the #92 Stratagraph Chevrolet Chevelle Laguna for Manning, and he won Rookie of the Year honors. Manning was released in 1978, and replaced by Terry Labonte. Hagan hired Petty Enterprises crew chief Dale Inman for the 1984 season. Labonte won the Southern 500, and won the 1984 championship. Labonte left the team in 1986, and was replaced by Sterling Marlin. Labonte returned to the team in 1991, but was unable to continue their success. 1994, marked Hagan's last season as a single car owner, fielding cars for John Andretti and Randy MacDonald. In 1996, his shop was purchased by Triad Motorsports. Hagan continued to serve as a co-owner of the operation until the team's demise in 1999.

The team ran 547 races, won 6 races, had 101 top 5s, 236 top 10s, 372 top 20s, and 15 poles. They led 3,551 laps out of a possible 156,701, completing 85.83% of them. The drivers who drove for Hagan was Billy Hagan himself, Randy McDonald, Mel Larson, Joe Millikan, Dick May, John Andretti, Skip Manning, Sterling Marlin, and Terry Labonte. Labonte is the only driver who won a race for the team and won the 1984 Winston Cup Championship.

== Team Results ==
=== Car No. 44/94/14 results (1979 onward) ===
Year	Driver	No.	Make	1	2	3	4	5	6	7	8	9	10	11	12	13	14	15	16	17	18	19	20	21	22	23	24	25	26	27	28	29	30	31	Owners	Pts
1979	Terry Labonte	44	Chevy	RSD; 35			RCH; 8	ATL; 25	NWS; 15	BRI; 7	DAR; 29	MAR; 9		NSV; 9	DOV; 6	CLT; 7	TWS; 5	RSD; 18	MCH; 25		NSV; 25	POC; 23		MCH; 26	BRI; 8	DAR; 3	RCH; 17	DOV; 25	MAR; 9	CLT; 15	NWS; 6	CAR; 27	ATL; 7		10th	3615
1979	Terry Labonte	44	Buick		DAY; 16	CAR; 15							TAL; 9							DAY; 29			TAL; 33												10th	3615
1979	Terry Labonte	44	Olds																															ONT; 13	10th	3615
1980	Terry Labonte	44	Chevy	RSD; 7		RCH; 24	CAR; 10	ATL; 15	BRI; 10	DAR; 32	NWS; 22	MAR; 23		NSV; 7	DOV; 5	CLT; 3	TWS; 5	RSD; 33	MCH; 11		NSV; 22	POC; 6		MCH; 11	BRI; 23	DAR; 1	RCH; 8	DOV; 28	NWS; 7	MAR; 7	CLT; 31	CAR; 4	ATL; 5	ONT; 8	8th	3766
1980	Terry Labonte	44	Olds		DAY; 6								TAL; 32							DAY; 32			TAL; 31												8th	3766
1981	Terry Labonte	44	Chevy	RSD; 2																															4th	4052
1981	Terry Labonte	44	Buick		DAY; 40	RCH; 26	CAR; 21	ATL; 19	BRI; 7	NWS; 7	DAR; 14	MAR; 5	TAL; 7	NSV; 6	DOV; 8	CLT; 14	TWS; 23	RSD; 22	MCH; 11	DAY; 8	NSV; 5	POC; 13	TAL; 3	MCH; 14	BRI; 3	DAR; 4	RCH; 4	DOV; 29	MAR; 9	NWS; 30	CLT; 23	CAR; 7	ATL; 7	RSD; 3	4th	4052
1982	Terry Labonte	44	Buick	DAY; 4			ATL; 8		DAR; 6			TAL; 2			CLT; 34		RSD; 2*	MCH; 28	DAY; 27		POC; 3	TAL; 5	MCH; 21	BRI; 4		RCH; 6	DOV; 27		CLT; 16		CAR; 4	ATL; 8	RSD; 27		3rd	4211
1982	Terry Labonte	44	Chevy		RCH; 5	BRI; 4		CAR; 2		NWS; 2	MAR; 20		NSV; 2	DOV; 4		POC; 5				NSV; 2					DAR; 35			NWS; 3		MAR; 4					3rd	4211
1983	Terry Labonte	44	Chevy	DAY; 6	RCH; 22	CAR; 24	ATL; 8	DAR; 36	NWS; 6	MAR; 6	TAL; 6	NSV; 8	DOV; 31	BRI; 6	CLT; 33	RSD; 31	POC; 9	MCH; 5*	DAY; 5	NSV; 11	POC; 12	TAL; 29	MCH; 4	BRI; 5	DAR; 5	RCH; 5	DOV; 4	MAR; 24	NWS; 5	CLT; 4	CAR; 1	ATL; 4	RSD; 7		5th	4004
1984	Terry Labonte	44	Chevy	DAY; 12	RCH; 3	CAR; 2	ATL; 7	BRI; 2	NWS; 4	DAR; 2	MAR; 24	TAL; 25	NSV; 8	DOV; 3	CLT; 30	RSD; 1*	POC; 3	MCH; 31	DAY; 7	NSV; 6	POC; 4	TAL; 3	MCH; 2*	BRI; 1*	DAR; 8	RCH; 8	DOV; 2	MAR; 2	CLT; 5	NWS; 9	CAR; 3	ATL; 30	RSD; 3		1st	4508
1985	Terry Labonte	44	Chevy	DAY; 25	RCH; 6	CAR; 3*	ATL; 6	BRI; 3	DAR; 4	NWS; 7	MAR; 6	TAL; 7	DOV; 16	CLT; 5	RSD; 1*	POC; 28	MCH; 22	DAY; 8	POC; 26	TAL; 39	MCH; 9	BRI; 29	DAR; 7	RCH; 2*	DOV; 24	MAR; 27	NWS; 3	CLT; 33	CAR; 12	ATL; 6	RSD; 2*				7th	3683
1986	Terry Labonte	44	Olds	DAY; 2	RCH; 15	CAR; 1*	ATL; 3	BRI; 7	DAR; 32	NWS; 27	MAR; 3	TAL; 29	DOV; 17	CLT; 11	RSD; 12	POC; 35	MCH; 12	DAY; 19	POC; 6	TAL; 38	GLN; 32	MCH; 12			RCH; 18	DOV; 19	MAR; 15	NWS; 10	CLT; 15	CAR; 31	ATL; 8	RSD; 10			12th	3473
1986	Terry Labonte	44	Chevy																				BRI; 2	DAR; 21											12th	3473
1987	Sterling Marlin	44	Olds	DAY; 30	CAR; 19	RCH; 21	ATL; 13	DAR; 4	NWS; 17	BRI; 24	MAR; 19	TAL; 14	CLT; 32	DOV; 10	POC; 15	RSD; 9	MCH; 18	DAY; 16	POC; 25	TAL; 14	GLN; 32	MCH; 15	BRI; 20	DAR; 4	RCH; 22	DOV; 5	MAR; 7	NWS; 20	CLT; 3	CAR; 11	RSD; 24	ATL; 9			11th	3381
1988	Sterling Marlin	44	Olds	DAY; 8	RCH; 5	CAR; 3	ATL; 20	DAR; 5	BRI; 8	NWS; 16	MAR; 2	TAL; 6	CLT; 27	DOV; 11	RSD; 9	POC; 28	MCH; 37	DAY; 34	POC; 14	TAL; 6	GLN; 8	MCH; 11	BRI; 12	DAR; 5	RCH; 16	DOV; 23	MAR; 26	CLT; 5	NWS; 14	CAR; 34	PHO; 10	ATL; 12			10th	3621
1989	Sterling Marlin	94	Olds	DAY; 11	CAR; 7	ATL; 5	RCH; 8	DAR; 5	BRI; 15	NWS; 26	MAR; 8	TAL; 14	CLT; 2	DOV; 26	SON; 40	POC; 6	MCH; 8	DAY; 7	POC; 36	TAL; 28	GLN; 7	MCH; 34	BRI; 18	DAR; 10	RCH; 28	DOV; 17	MAR; 20	CLT; 7	NWS; 19	CAR; 23	PHO; 30	ATL; 3			12th	3422
1990	Sterling Marlin	94	Olds	DAY; 19	RCH; 13	CAR; 4	ATL; 10	DAR; 28	BRI; 7	NWS; 31	MAR; 32	TAL; 26	CLT; 35	DOV; 5	SON; 6	POC; 9	MCH; 18	DAY; 5	POC; 30	TAL; 3	GLN; 15	MCH; 20	BRI; 5	DAR; 18	RCH; 24	DOV; 12	MAR; 12	NWS; 13	CLT; 16	CAR; 6	PHO; 16	ATL; 38			14th	3387
1991	Terry Labonte	94	Olds	DAY; 13	RCH; 14	CAR; 39	ATL; 35	DAR; 15	BRI; 9	NWS; 31	MAR; 31	TAL; 37	CLT; 10	DOV; 24	SON; 6	POC; 21	MCH; 25	DAY; 41	POC; 15	TAL; 24	GLN; 34	MCH; 16	BRI; 9	DAR; 5	RCH; 19	DOV; 26	MAR; 6	NWS; 14	CLT; 6	CAR; 28	PHO; 12	ATL; 15			19th	3024
1992	Terry Labonte	94	Olds	DAY; 7	CAR; 7	RCH; 8	ATL; 9	DAR; 9	BRI; 4	NWS; 9	MAR; 4		CLT; 6	DOV; 21	SON; 2	POC; 10	MCH; 38		POC; 16		GLN; 8	MCH; 23	BRI; 31	DAR; 14	RCH; 13	DOV; 7	MAR; 11	NWS; 8		CAR; 9	PHO; 16				8th	3674
1992	Terry Labonte	94	Ford									TAL; 36						DAY; 21		TAL; 18															8th	3674
1992	Terry Labonte	94	Chevy																										CLT; 12			ATL; 5			8th	3674
1993	Terry Labonte	14	Chevy	DAY; 11	CAR; 10	RCH; 24	ATL; 33	DAR; 9	BRI; 21	NWS; 6	MAR; 9	TAL; 37	SON; 9	CLT; 33	DOV; 20	POC; 32	MCH; 20	DAY; 9	NHA; 31	POC; 16	TAL; 14	GLN; 23	MCH; 29	BRI; 34	DAR; 33	RCH; 8	DOV; 8	MAR; 7	NWS; 7	CLT; 16	CAR; 15	PHO; 14	ATL; 13		19th	3280
1994	John Andretti	14	Chevy	DAY; 42	CAR; 24	RCH; 30	ATL; 42	DAR; 38	BRI; DNQ	NWS; 31	MAR; 35	TAL; 29	SON; 19	CLT; 36	DOV; 22	POC; 35	MCH; 36	DAY; 35	NHA; 27	POC; 25	TAL; 40	IND; 28	GLN	MCH											40th	1308
1994	Phil Parsons	14	Chevy																						BRI; DNQ	DAR	RCH	DOV	MAR	NWS	CLT				40th	1308
1994	Randy MacDonald	14	Chevy																													CAR; 24	PHO	ATL	40th	1308
1995	Randy MacDonald	14	Pontiac	DAY; DNQ	CAR	RCH	ATL	DAR	BRI	NWS	MAR	TAL	SON							POC; DNQ	TAL	IND	GLN	MCH	BRI	DAR	RCH	DOV	MAR	NWS	CLT	CAR	PHO	ATL	N/A	0
1995	Jimmy Hensley	14	Ford											CLT; DNQ	DOV	POC	MCH	DAY	NHA																N/A	0

=== Car No. 1/72 results ===
Year	Driver	No.	Make	1	2	3	4	5	6	7	8	9	10	11	12	13	14	15	16	17	18	19	20	21	22	23	24	25	26	27	28	29	30	Owners	Pts
1984	Joe Millikan	1	Chevy	DAY	RCH	CAR	ATL	BRI	NWS	DAR	MAR	TAL	NSV	DOV	CLT	RSD	POC	MCH	DAY	NSV	POC	TAL	MCH	BRI	DAR	RCH	DOV	MAR	CLT	NWS	CAR	ATL	RSD; 38		49
1993	John Andretti	72	Chevy	DAY	CAR	RCH	ATL	DAR	BRI	NWS	MAR	TAL	SON	CLT	DOV	POC	MCH	DAY	NHA	POC	TAL	GLN	MCH	BRI	DAR	RCH	DOV	MAR	NWS; 24	CLT; 31	CAR; 39	PHO; 40	ATL; DNQ		250
