= 1987 The Winston =

Third iteration of the NASCAR All-Star Race

Race details
- Race 2 of 2 exhibition races in the 1987 NASCAR Winston Cup Series
- Date: May 17, 1987
- Location: Concord, North Carolina
- Course: Charlotte Motor Speedway
- Course length: 1.5 miles (2.4 km)
- Distance: 135 laps, 202.5 mi (324 km)
- Weather: Temperatures around 82 °F (28 °C), with humidity at 59% and winds gusting to 8 miles per hour (13 km/h) southwest
- Average speed: 153.023 mph (246.267 km/h)

Pole position
Driver	Bill Elliott	Melling Racing

Most laps led
Driver	Bill Elliott	Melling Racing
- Laps: 121

Winner
No. 3	Dale Earnhardt	Richard Childress Racing

Television in the United States
- Network: ABC
- Announcers: Keith Jackson and Donnie Allison

The 1987 edition of The Winston was a stock car racing competition that took place on May 17, 1987. Held at Charlotte Motor Speedway in Concord, North Carolina, the 135-lap race was an exhibition race in the 1987 NASCAR Winston Cup Series. Bill Elliott of Melling Racing won the pole and led the most laps (121), but it was Dale Earnhardt of Richard Childress Racing who won the race in a move that would be known in NASCAR history as the Pass in the Grass.

This was Tim Richmond's second and final appearance in The Winston. Despite being eligible for the 1988 Winston, he opted not to participate due to a then-ongoing lawsuit against NASCAR after he was suspended for testing positive for banned substances early that year. He died of complications from AIDS on August 13, 1989.

== Background ==
Charlotte Motor Speedway, where the race was held

The 1987 All-Star Race featured a new eligibility rule that changed the race from the winners of the previous year to a new format that guaranteed a 20-car starting field. Exemptions to the race were awarded based on winners of the previous year and winners of the current season up to the last race before the All-Star Race, which for 1987 was the May Talladega round. In addition, the winner of the 1986 Atlanta Invitational, which is now regarded as the first All-Star Open, was invited to the race, along with the winner of the 1987 All-Star Open. As the field did not meet the minimum requirement of 19 cars, the remaining spots were awarded to the most recent winning drivers prior to the 1986 season.

=== 1987 The Winston drivers and eligibility ===
==== Race winners in 1986 and 1987 ====
- 3-Dale Earnhardt (11 wins from 1986 and 1987)
- 5-Geoff Bodine (2 wins in 1986, including the 1986 Daytona 500)
- 8-Bobby Hillin Jr. (1 win in 1986)
- 9-Bill Elliott (3 wins from 1986 and 1987, including the 1987 Daytona 500)
- 11-Terry Labonte (1 win in 1986)
- 15-Ricky Rudd (3 wins from 1986 and 1987)
- 17-Darrell Waltrip (3 wins in 1986)
- 21-Kyle Petty (1 win in 1986)
- 22-Bobby Allison (1 win in 1986)
- 25-Tim Richmond (7 wins in 1986)
- 26-Morgan Shepherd (1 win in 1986)
- 27-Rusty Wallace (2 wins in 1986)
- 28-Davey Allison (1 win in 1987)
- 75-Neil Bonnett (1 win in 1986)

==== 1986 Atlanta Invitational winner ====
- 55-Benny Parsons

==== Race winners from previous years, not eligible by the above criteria, most recent win ====
- 29-Cale Yarborough (October 1985 - Miller High Life 500)
- 33-Harry Gant (September 1985 - Holly Farms 400)
- 50-Greg Sacks (July 1985 - Pepsi Firecracker 400)
- 43-Richard Petty (July 1984 - Pepsi Firecracker 400)

==== Winner of All-Star Open ====
- 88-Buddy Baker

== Race summary ==
=== Segment 1 ===
Bill Elliott won the pole with a track record of 170.827 mph (274.919 km/h). Buddy Baker made the starting grid by winning the Winston Open. Cale Yarborough served as the onboard camera car throughout the race. On the first lap, Dale Earnhardt and Geoff Bodine got loose and tangled with each other, with Earnhardt slightly hitting the turn three wall and both cars losing several positions in the process. Earnhardt eventually inched his way towards the top-five throughout the race. On lap 62, Neil Bonnett and Richard Petty collided in turn three, bringing out the first caution and ending their chances of finishing the race. Segment 1 ended on lap 76 with Elliott in first place.

Segment results

1. 9-Bill Elliott ($25,000)
2. 5-Geoff Bodine
3. 17-Darrell Waltrip

=== Segment 2 ===
Baker retired on lap 95 due to a transmission failure while Harry Gant suffered engine problems on lap 121. Segment 2 ended on lap 126, with Elliott once again on the top spot.

Segment results

1. 9-Bill Elliott ($50,000)
2. 3-Dale Earnhardt
3. 5-Geoff Bodine

=== Segment 3 ===
As Segment 3 began, Bodine attempted to pass in front of Elliott, but both cars tangled with Bodine spinning while Earnhardt took over the lead before the caution came out. With eight laps to go, Elliott closed in on Earnhardt and tapped him from behind. Earnhardt was sent to the infield grass, but he quickly recovered to maintain the lead in what has become known as the "pass in the grass". Both cars once again traded paint side-by-side, but the contact cut Elliott's left rear tire, forcing him to pit and go a lap down while Terry Labonte charged forward to challenge Earnhardt. Eventually, Earnhardt beat Labonte and Tim Richmond to win The Winston and earn $200,000.

Following the race, a frustrated Elliott bumped Earnhardt before all cars returned to pit road and Earnhardt entered victory lane.

Race results
Pos	Grid	Car	Driver	Owner	Manufacturer	Laps run	Laps led
1	4	3	Dale Earnhardt	Richard Childress Racing	Chevrolet	135	10
2	12	11	Terry Labonte	Junior Johnson & Associates	Chevrolet	135	0
3	2	25	Tim Richmond	Hendrick Motorsports	Chevrolet	135	0
4	5	5	Geoff Bodine	Hendrick Motorsports	Chevrolet	135	3
5	7	27	Rusty Wallace	Blue Max Racing	Pontiac	135	0
6	15	21	Kyle Petty	Wood Brothers Racing	Ford	135	1
7	17	26	Morgan Shepherd	King Racing	Buick	135	0
8	14	22	Bobby Allison	Stavola Brothers Racing	Buick	135	0
9	9	17	Darrell Waltrip	Hendrick Motorsports	Chevrolet	135	0
10	6	55	Benny Parsons	Jackson Motorsports	Oldsmobile	135	0
11	18	15	Ricky Rudd	Bud Moore Engineering	Ford	135	0
12	3	28	Davey Allison	Rainier-Lundy Racing	Ford	134	0
13	19	29	Cale Yarborough	Cale Yarborough Motorsports	Oldsmobile	134	0
14	1	9	Bill Elliott	Melling Racing	Ford	134	121
15	11	50	Greg Sacks	Dingman Brothers Racing	Pontiac	132	0
16	10	8	Bobby Hillin Jr.	Stavola Brothers Racing	Buick	132	0
17	13	33	Harry Gant	Mach 1 Racing	Chevrolet	121	0
18	20	88	Buddy Baker	Baker-Schiff Racing	Oldsmobile	95	0
19	16	43	Richard Petty	Petty Enterprises	Pontiac	63	0
20	8	75	Neil Bonnett	RahMoc Enterprises	Pontiac	62	0

== Aftermath ==
NASCAR fined Earnhardt and Elliott $10,000 each for aggressive driving, with $7,500 being returned over the next seven weeks for good behavior. Geoff Bodine was fined $5,000 with $4,000 being returned over the next seven weeks for good behavior. Elliott and Earnhardt later made up, with Elliott issuing a public apology and accepting the penalty. On May 27, 1987, a fan sent NASCAR President Bill France Jr. a letter threatening to kill Earnhardt at Pocono, Watkins Glen, or Dover. NASCAR immediately handed over the letter to the FBI, who provided security for Earnhardt on all three tracks. The investigation was closed after the races on the three tracks finished with no incident.
