= 1986 The Winston =

Second iteration of the NASCAR All-Star Race

Race details
- Race 2 of 2 exhibition races in the 1986 NASCAR Winston Cup Series
- Date: May 11, 1986
- Location: Hampton, Georgia
- Course: Atlanta International Raceway
- Course length: 1.522 miles (2.45 km)
- Distance: 83 laps, 126.3 mi (203.26 km)
- Weather: Temperatures around 67.2 °F (19.6 °C), with winds gusting to 8.52 miles per hour (13.71 km/h)
- Average speed: 159.123 mph (256.084 km/h)
- Attendance: 18,500

Pole position
Driver	Darrell Waltrip	Junior Johnson & Associates

Most laps led
Driver	Bill Elliott	Melling Racing
- Laps: 82

Winner
No. 9	Bill Elliott	Melling Racing

Television in the United States
- Network: ESPN
- Announcers: Bob Jenkins, Larry Nuber, and Benny Parsons

The 1986 The Winston, the second running of the NASCAR All-Star Race, was a stock car racing competition that took place on May 11, 1986. The only time The Winston was held at Atlanta International Raceway in Hampton, Georgia, the 83-lap race was the second exhibition race in the 1986 NASCAR Winston Cup Series. Bill Elliott of Melling Racing led the most laps (82) and won the caution-free race and US$200,000, along with US$40,000 for leading laps 20, 30, 50, and 60.

The event featured the Atlanta Invitational, a 100-lap race for drivers who did not meet the eligibility of The Winston. Benny Parsons of Jackson Brothers Motorsports won the race and US$75,000 and became eligible to run the 1987 The Winston. The Atlanta Invitational was held before The Winston, but due to a tape delay, ESPN aired the race after The Winston.

NASCAR's original plan for The Winston was to hold the race at a different track every year, but due to the dismal attendance of this race, The Winston was moved back to Charlotte Motor Speedway for the next 32 years before Bristol Motor Speedway hosted the 2020 NASCAR All-Star Race.

== Background ==
The Winston was open to race winners from the 1985 season. Because the field was one short of the minimum requirement of 10 cars, the final spot was awarded to the highest finishing driver in the 1985 points standings without a win. The pole position was awarded to the defending Winston Cup champion while the rest of the field was determined by the total number of wins from last season, with driver's points used as the tiebreaker.

=== 1986 The Winston drivers and eligibility ===
==== Race winners in 1985 ====
- 3-Dale Earnhardt (4 wins)
- 9-Bill Elliott (11 wins, including the 1985 Daytona 500)
- 10-Greg Sacks (1 win)
- 11-Darrell Waltrip (3 wins, defending 1985 champion)
- 12-Neil Bonnett (2 wins)
- 15-Ricky Rudd (1 win)
- 28-Cale Yarborough (2 wins)
- 33-Harry Gant (3 wins)
- 44-Terry Labonte (1 win)

==== Awarded by points ====
- 5-Geoff Bodine (5th in 1985 driver's points)

== Race summary ==
=== Atlanta Invitational ===
The Atlanta Invitational was a 100-lap exhibition race featuring 14 participants that did not meet the eligibility of The Winston. Benny Parsons won the caution-free race and US$75,000. The win also gave him the eligibility to run the 1987 Winston.

Race results
Pos	Grid	Car	Driver	Owner	Manufacturer	Laps run	Laps led
1	5	55	Benny Parsons	Jackson Brothers Motorsports	Oldsmobile	100	37
2	2	25	Tim Richmond	Hendrick Motorsports	Chevrolet	100	56
3	3	8	Bobby Hillin Jr.	Stavola Brothers Racing	Buick	100	0
4	6	4	Lake Speed	Morgan–McClure Motorsports	Oldsmobile	100	3
5	7	26	Joe Ruttman	King Racing	Buick	100	2
6	4	22	Bobby Allison	Stavola Brothers Racing	Buick	100	0
7	8	43	Richard Petty	Petty Enterprises	Pontiac	100	0
8	10	88	Buddy Baker	Baker-Schiff Racing	Oldsmobile	100	0
9	9	73	Dave Marcis	Marcis Auto Racing	Ford	99	0
10	11	67	Buddy Arrington	Arrington Racing	Ford	97	0
11	12	52	Jimmy Means	Means Racing	Pontiac	94	0
12	1	7	Kyle Petty	Wood Brothers Racing	Ford	69	2
13	14	70	J. D. McDuffie	McDuffie Racing	Pontiac	37	0
14	13	6	Trevor Boys	U.S. Racing	Chevrolet	24	0

=== The Winston ===
The Winston was an 83-lap exhibition race with a combined purse of US$500,000. The earnings were as follows:

The Winston earnings
First place	US$200,000
Second place	US$75,000
Third place	US$60,000
Fourth place	US$50,000
Fifth place	US$30,000
Sixth place	US$25,000
Seventh place	US$20,000
Eighth place	US$15,000
Ninth place	US$14,500
Tenth place	US$10,000

In addition, a purse bonus of US$10,000 was given to the drivers who led laps 20, 30, 50, and 60.

Chevrolet Monte Carlo driver Darrell Waltrip and Ford Thunderbird driver Bill Elliott led the field on the green flag. Despite being the pole sitter, Waltrip lost momentum as Elliott and Dale Earnhardt passed him before the first lap. Prior to the first pit stop, Waltrip struggled with an ill-handling car as he dropped below the top five while Cale Yarborough and Harry Gant battled for third and Neil Bonnett and Geoff Bodine fought for fifth place. With no one close enough to challenge him, Elliott earned US$20,000 by leading laps 20 and 30. The two-tire pit stop began on lap 40. After changing left-side tires, Elliott passed Earnhardt at full speed to regain the lead. He once again collected US$20,000 for leading laps 50 and 60. Elliott dominated the race and took the checkered flag to win US$200,000 with Earnhardt, Gant, Waltrip, and Yarborough wrapping up the top five.

Race results
Pos	Grid	Car	Driver	Owner	Manufacturer	Laps run	Laps led
1	2	9	Bill Elliott	Melling Racing	Ford	83	82
2	3	3	Dale Earnhardt	Richard Childress Racing	Chevrolet	83	1
3	4	33	Harry Gant	Mach 1 Racing	Chevrolet	83	0
4	1	11	Darrell Waltrip	Junior Johnson & Associates	Chevrolet	83	0
5	6	28	Cale Yarborough	Rainier-Lundy Racing	Ford	83	0
6	5	12	Neil Bonnett	Junior Johnson & Associates	Chevrolet	83	0
7	10	5	Geoff Bodine	Hendrick Motorsports	Chevrolet	83	0
8	7	15	Ricky Rudd	Bud Moore Engineering	Ford	82	0
9	8	44	Terry Labonte	Hagan Racing	Chevrolet	82	0
10	9	10	Greg Sacks	DiGard Motorsports	Chevrolet	82	0
