= 1988 The Winston =

Fourth iteration of the NASCAR All-Star Race

Race details
- Race 2 of 2 exhibition races in the 1988 NASCAR Winston Cup Series
- Date: May 22, 1988
- Location: Concord, North Carolina
- Course: Charlotte Motor Speedway
- Course length: 1.5 miles (2.4 km)
- Distance: 135 laps, 202.5 mi (324 km)
- Weather: 85 °F (29 °C), humidity of 41% and winds of 9 miles per hour (14 km/h), partly cloudy
- Average speed: 153.023 mph (246.267 km/h)

Pole position
Driver	Darrell Waltrip	Hendrick Motorsports

Most laps led
Driver	Darrell Waltrip	Hendrick Motorsports
- Laps: 50

Winner
No. 11	Terry Labonte	Junior Johnson & Associates

Television in the United States
- Network: ABC
- Announcers: Keith Jackson and Jerry Punch

The 1988 edition of The Winston was a stock car racing competition that took place on May 22, 1988. Held at Charlotte Motor Speedway in Concord, North Carolina, the 135-lap race was an exhibition race in the 1988 NASCAR Winston Cup Series. Darrell Waltrip of Hendrick Motorsports won the pole and led the most laps (50), but it was Terry Labonte of Junior Johnson & Associates who won the race.

== Background ==
Charlotte Motor Speedway, the track where the race was held.

The Winston was open to race winners from last season through the 1988 Winston 500 at Talladega Superspeedway. The winner of The Winston Open advanced to complete the starting grid. Because the field did not meet the minimum requirement of 19 cars, the remaining spots were awarded to the most recent winning drivers prior to the 1987 season. Richard Petty lost his eligibility when Phil Parsons won the Talladega race a week earlier.

Tim Richmond opted not to participate in the race due to a then-ongoing legal dispute with NASCAR after he was suspended for testing positive for banned substances early that year. He died of complications from AIDS on August 13, 1989.

The 1988 season saw the first of two tire wars between Goodyear and Hoosier. For this race, NASCAR allowed teams to switch between both tire brands once during pit stops.

=== 1988 The Winston drivers and eligibility ===
==== Race winners in 1987 and 1988 ====
- 3-Dale Earnhardt (12 wins from 1987 and 1988)
- 9-Bill Elliott (7 wins from 1987 and 1988, including the 1987 Daytona 500)
- 11-Terry Labonte (2 wins from 1987 and 1988)
- 17-Darrell Waltrip (1 win in 1987)
- 21-Kyle Petty (1 win in 1987)
- 22-Bobby Allison (2 wins from 1987 and 1988, including the 1988 Daytona 500)
- 25-Tim Richmond (2 wins in 1987) - withdrawn
- 26-Ricky Rudd (2 wins in 1987)
- 27-Rusty Wallace (2 wins in 1987)
- 28-Davey Allison (2 wins in 1987)
- 55-Phil Parsons (1 win in 1988)
- 75-Neil Bonnett (2 wins in 1988)
- 83-Lake Speed (1 win in 1988)

==== Race winners from previous years, not eligible by the above criteria ====
- 5-Geoff Bodine (2 wins in 1986, including the 1986 Daytona 500)
- 8-Bobby Hillin Jr. (1 win in 1986)
- 29-Cale Yarborough (2 wins in 1985)
- 33-Harry Gant (3 wins in 1985)
- 47-Morgan Shepherd (1 win in 1986)
- 50-Greg Sacks (1 win in 1985)

==== Winner of The Winston Open ====
- 44-Sterling Marlin

== Race summary ==
As the race broadcast was using a boxing motif, the segments were referred to as "rounds".

=== Round 1 (75 laps) ===
Darrell Waltrip won the pole with a track record of 174.154 mph (280.274 km/h). Geoff Bodine started on the outside pole after achieving a qualifying time of 173.980 mph (279.994 km/h). Both drivers beat Bill Elliott's 1987 pole record of 170.827 mph (274.919 km/h). Sterling Marlin made the starting grid by winning the Winston Open. Bodine and Phil Parsons served as the onboard camera cars throughout the race. Waltrip and Bodine were first and second during the first five laps before the first caution was triggered by Greg Sacks blowing an engine and spilling oil on the track. Shortly after the restart on lap 9, Waltrip extended his lead over Bodine and the rest of the field. Davey Allison took the lead from Waltrip on lap on lap 34. The yellow flag was waved again on lap 49, when Cale Yarborough's engine expired. Harry Gant retired on lap 52 due to oil pan issues. Parsons blew an engine and was eliminated on lap 57. A precise strategy during the green-flag pit stop saw Dale Earnhardt take the lead. With one lap to go, Davey Allison closed in on Earnhardt until he reclaimed the lead on lap 74 and concluded Round 1 by collecting US$20,000. Following the end of the round, Earnhardt blew a right-front tire and slammed the turn one wall, requiring major repairs during the 10-minute intermission.

Round results

1. 28-Davey Allison ($20,000)
2. 3-Dale Earnhardt
3. 17-Darrell Waltrip

=== Round 2 (50 laps) ===
At the start of Round 2, Earnhardt's repaired car overtook Davey Allison, but quickly fell back as Waltrip, Davey Allison, and Terry Labonte overtook him. Lake Speed then took the lead from Waltrip halfway through the round. The caution was triggered on lap 98, when Ricky Rudd lost control and slammed the turn two wall; he collapsed after exiting his car and was rushed to the infield care center. He sustained a torn ligament on his right knee from the accident. Round 2 ended with Elliott, Speed, and Marlin in the top three. During the 10-minute intermission, Davey Allison's pit crew installed a new rear end differential, but NASCAR ordered them to reinstall the old unit. Bodine was forced to retire after his pit crew were unable to resolve an engine problem.

Round results

1. 9-Bill Elliott ($20,000)
2. 83-Lake Speed
3. 44-Sterling Marlin

=== Round 3 (10 laps) ===
Elliott and Speed duked it out at the beginning of the 10-lap shootout until Speed lost momentum and tagged the turn two wall while Labonte challenged Elliott for the lead. Both Rusty Wallace and Bobby Hillin Jr. experienced engine problems and retired. Marlin took second place from Elliott and slowly closed in on Labonte. In the end, Labonte extended his lead and crossed the finish line to win the race and collect US$200,000.

Race results
Pos	Grid	Car	Driver	Owner	Manufacturer	Laps run	Laps led
1	12	11	Terry Labonte	Junior Johnson & Associates	Chevrolet	135	9
2	19	44	Sterling Marlin	Hagan Racing	Oldsmobile	135	0
3	7	28	Davey Allison	Ranier-Lundy Racing	Ford	134	0
4	5	9	Bill Elliott	Melling Racing	Ford	135	19
5	4	12	Bobby Allison	Stavola Brothers Racing	Buick	135	0
6	12	21	Kyle Petty	Wood Brothers Racing	Ford	135	0
7	3	3	Dale Earnhardt	Richard Childress Racing	Chevrolet	135	17
8	16	47	Morgan Shepherd	Shepherd Racing	Buick	134	0
9	1	17	Darrell Waltrip	Hendrick Motorsports	Chevrolet	133	50
10	15	75	Neil Bonnett	RahMoc Enterprises	Pontiac	133	0
11	18	83	Lake Speed	Speed Racing	Oldsmobile	127	13
12	2	5	Geoff Bodine	Hendrick Motorsports	Chevrolet	125	0
13	10	27	Rusty Wallace	Blue Max Racing	Pontiac	124	0
14	14	8	Bobby Hillin Jr.	Stavola Brothers Racing	Buick	124	0
15	8	26	Ricky Rudd	King Racing	Buick	96	0
16	13	55	Phil Parsons	Jackson Motorsports	Oldsmobile	57	0
17	11	52	Harry Gant	Mach 1 Racing	Chevrolet	121	0
18	9	29	Cale Yarborough	Cale Yarborough Motorsports	Oldsmobile	48	0
19	17	50	Greg Sacks	Dingman Brothers Racing	Pontiac	5	0
