= 2020 NASCAR All-Star Race =

36th iteration of the NASCAR All-Star Race

Race details
- Date: July 15, 2020
- Location: Bristol Motor Speedway in Bristol, Tennessee
- Course: Permanent racing facility 0.533 mi (0.858 km)
- Distance: Open: 85 laps, 45.305 mi (72.911 km); Stage 1: 35 laps Stage 2: 35 laps Stage 3: 15 laps All-Star Race: 140 Laps, 74.62 mi (120.09 km); Stage 1: 55 laps Stage 2: 35 laps Stage 3: 35 laps Stage 4: 15 laps
- Avg Speed: Open: 57.388 mph (92.357 km/h); All-Star Race: 65.68 mph (105.70 km/h)

NASCAR All Star Open
- Pole: Michael McDowell (Front Row Motorsports)
- Time: N/A
- Winner (segment 1): Aric Almirola (Stewart–Haas Racing)
- Winner (segment 2): William Byron (Hendrick Motorsports)
- Winner (segment 3): Matt DiBenedetto (Wood Brothers Racing)
- Fan Vote winners: Clint Bowyer (Stewart–Haas Racing)

NASCAR All-Star Race
- Pole: Martin Truex Jr. (Joe Gibbs Racing)
- Time: N/A
- Most laps led: Ryan Blaney (Team Penske)
- Laps led: 72
- Winner: Chase Elliott (Hendrick Motorsports)

Television
- Network: FS1
- Announcers: Mike Joy and Jeff Gordon
- Nielsen ratings: 1.516 million (Open); 2.076 million (All Star)

Radio
- Network: Motor Racing Network
- Announcers: Alex Hayden and Jeff Striegle (Booth); Dave Moody (1 & 2); Kyle Rickey (3 & 4) (Turns)

The 2020 NASCAR All-Star Race (XXXVI) was a NASCAR Cup Series stock car exhibition race that was originally scheduled to be held on May 16, 2020, and was rescheduled to July 15, 2020, at Bristol Motor Speedway in Bristol, Tennessee. Contested over 140 laps, it was the second exhibition race of the 2020 NASCAR Cup Series season. It was the first All-Star Race since the 1986 Winston at Atlanta Motor Speedway to be hosted outside Charlotte Motor Speedway.

== Report ==
=== Background ===
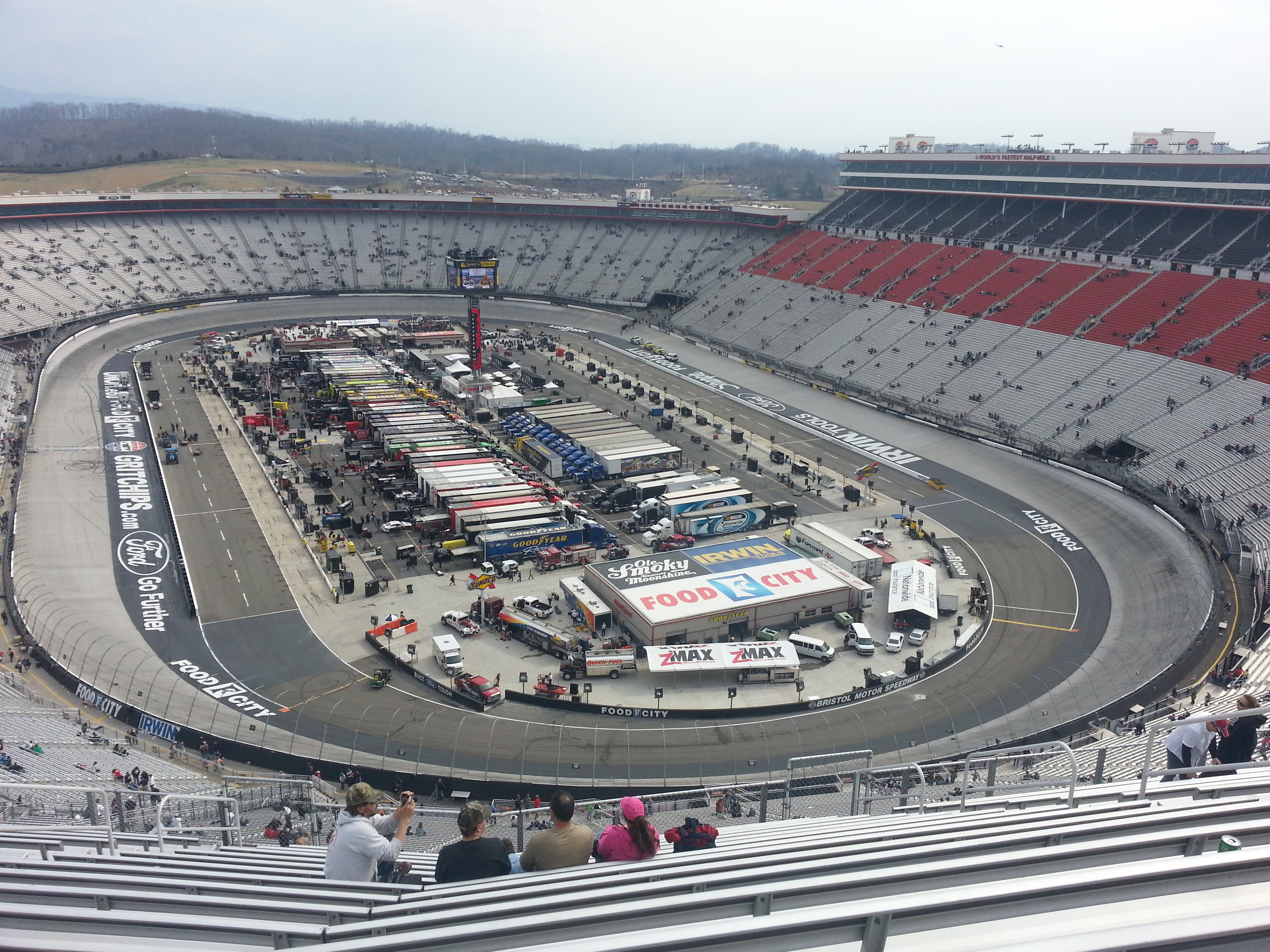
Bristol Motor Speedway

The All-Star Race is open to race winners from last season through the 2020 Quaker State 400 at Kentucky Speedway, all previous All-Star race winners, NASCAR Cup champions who had attempted to qualify for every race in 2020, the winner of each stage of the All-Star Open, and the winner of the All-Star fan vote are eligible to compete in the All-Star Race.

Originally to be held at Charlotte Motor Speedway, this was the program cover anticipating the original date and venue before the pandemic forced NASCAR to move the event to Bristol Motor Speedway at a different date.

As part of scheduling changes associated with the COVID-19 pandemic, and citing a desire to host the race with fans (which was not then possible due to health orders in North Carolina), the All-Star Race was moved from Charlotte Motor Speedway to Bristol Motor Speedway.

While most NASCAR races held during the pandemic had been held behind closed doors with no spectators, the All-Star Race admitted 30,000 spectators with social distancing. Although this was only 20% of the venue's total capacity of 162,000, the All-Star Race hosted the largest number of spectators at a U.S. sporting event since the beginning of pandemic-related restrictions.

A new "choose rule" was used for restarts during the race, where drivers could choose whether they wanted to be in the inside or outside lane. NASCAR experimented with an underglow lighting package on vehicles at the All-Star Race, color-coded by manufacturer (with Chevrolet in orange, Ford in blue, and Toyota in red). This package was featured on the vehicles of all drivers who had automatically qualified for the event. At the request of teams, NASCAR also experimented with moving the numbers on the sides of vehicles closer to their rear tires, in order to provide additional room for sponsor logos. This change became permanent upon the introduction of the Next Gen car in 2022.

==== Entry list ====
- (R) denotes rookie driver.
- (i) denotes driver who is ineligible for series driver points.

===== NASCAR All Star Open =====
No.	Driver	Team	Manufacturer
00	Quin Houff (R)	StarCom Racing	Chevrolet
3	Austin Dillon	Richard Childress Racing	Chevrolet
8	Tyler Reddick (R)	Richard Childress Racing	Chevrolet
10	Aric Almirola	Stewart–Haas Racing	Ford
13	Ty Dillon	Germain Racing	Chevrolet
14	Clint Bowyer	Stewart–Haas Racing	Ford
15	Brennan Poole (R)	Premium Motorsports	Chevrolet
17	Chris Buescher	Roush Fenway Racing	Ford
21	Matt DiBenedetto	Wood Brothers Racing	Ford
24	William Byron	Hendrick Motorsports	Chevrolet
27	J. J. Yeley (i)	Rick Ware Racing	Ford
32	Corey LaJoie	Go Fas Racing	Ford
34	Michael McDowell	Front Row Motorsports	Ford
37	Ryan Preece	JTG Daugherty Racing	Chevrolet
38	John Hunter Nemechek (R)	Front Row Motorsports	Ford
43	Bubba Wallace	Richard Petty Motorsports	Chevrolet
47	Ricky Stenhouse Jr.	JTG Daugherty Racing	Chevrolet
51	Joey Gase (i)	Petty Ware Racing	Ford
53	Garrett Smithley (i)	Rick Ware Racing	Chevrolet
66	Timmy Hill (i)	MBM Motorsports	Toyota
95	Christopher Bell (R)	Leavine Family Racing	Toyota
96	Daniel Suárez	Gaunt Brothers Racing	Toyota
Official entry list

===== NASCAR All-Star Race =====
No.	Driver	Team	Manufacturer
1	Kurt Busch	Chip Ganassi Racing	Chevrolet
2	Brad Keselowski	Team Penske	Ford
4	Kevin Harvick	Stewart–Haas Racing	Ford
6	Ryan Newman	Roush Fenway Racing	Ford
9	Chase Elliott	Hendrick Motorsports	Chevrolet
11	Denny Hamlin	Joe Gibbs Racing	Toyota
12	Ryan Blaney	Team Penske	Ford
18	Kyle Busch	Joe Gibbs Racing	Toyota
19	Martin Truex Jr.	Joe Gibbs Racing	Toyota
20	Erik Jones	Joe Gibbs Racing	Toyota
22	Joey Logano	Team Penske	Ford
41	Cole Custer (R)	Stewart–Haas Racing	Ford
42	Matt Kenseth	Chip Ganassi Racing	Chevrolet
48	Jimmie Johnson	Hendrick Motorsports	Chevrolet
77	Justin Haley (i)	Spire Motorsports	Chevrolet
88	Alex Bowman	Hendrick Motorsports	Chevrolet
Official entry list

== Qualifying (Open) ==
Michael McDowell was awarded the pole for the open as determined by a random draw.

=== Open Starting Lineup ===
Pos	No.	Driver	Team	Manufacturer
1	34	Michael McDowell	Front Row Motorsports	Ford
2	10	Aric Almirola	Stewart–Haas Racing	Ford
3	95	Christopher Bell (R)	Leavine Family Racing	Toyota
4	47	Ricky Stenhouse Jr.	JTG Daugherty Racing	Chevrolet
5	8	Tyler Reddick (R)	Richard Childress Racing	Chevrolet
6	43	Bubba Wallace	Richard Petty Motorsports	Chevrolet
7	24	William Byron	Hendrick Motorsports	Chevrolet
8	17	Chris Buescher	Roush Fenway Racing	Ford
9	14	Clint Bowyer	Stewart–Haas Racing	Ford
10	21	Matt DiBenedetto	Wood Brothers Racing	Ford
11	3	Austin Dillon	Richard Childress Racing	Chevrolet
12	37	Ryan Preece	JTG Daugherty Racing	Chevrolet
13	27	J. J. Yeley (i)	Rick Ware Racing	Ford
14	53	Garrett Smithley (i)	Rick Ware Racing	Chevrolet
15	15	Brennan Poole (R)	Premium Motorsports	Chevrolet
16	00	Quin Houff (R)	StarCom Racing	Chevrolet
17	51	Joey Gase (i)	Petty Ware Racing	Ford
18	96	Daniel Suárez	Gaunt Brothers Racing	Toyota
19	38	John Hunter Nemechek (R)	Front Row Motorsports	Ford
20	13	Ty Dillon	Germain Racing	Chevrolet
21	32	Corey LaJoie	Go Fas Racing	Ford
Withdrew
WD	66	Timmy Hill (i)	MBM Motorsports	Toyota
Official Open starting lineup

== Qualifying (All-Star Race) ==
Martin Truex Jr. was awarded the pole for the race as determined by a random draw.

=== All-Star Race Starting Lineup ===
Pos	No.	Driver	Team	Manufacturer
1	19	Martin Truex Jr.	Joe Gibbs Racing	Toyota
2	88	Alex Bowman	Hendrick Motorsports	Chevrolet
3	12	Ryan Blaney	Team Penske	Ford
4	77	Justin Haley (i)	Spire Motorsports	Chevrolet
5	4	Kevin Harvick	Stewart–Haas Racing	Ford
6	42	Matt Kenseth	Chip Ganassi Racing	Chevrolet
7	1	Kurt Busch	Chip Ganassi Racing	Chevrolet
8	41	Cole Custer (R)	Stewart–Haas Racing	Ford
9	2	Brad Keselowski	Team Penske	Ford
10	18	Kyle Busch	Joe Gibbs Racing	Toyota
11	6	Ryan Newman	Roush Fenway Racing	Ford
12	22	Joey Logano	Team Penske	Ford
13	9	Chase Elliott	Hendrick Motorsports	Chevrolet
14	48	Jimmie Johnson	Hendrick Motorsports	Chevrolet
15	11	Denny Hamlin	Joe Gibbs Racing	Toyota
16	20	Erik Jones	Joe Gibbs Racing	Toyota
Official All-Star starting lineup

== NASCAR All Star Open ==
=== NASCAR All Star Open results ===
Pos	Grid	No.	Driver	Team	Manufacturer	Laps
1	10	21	Matt DiBenedetto	Wood Brothers Racing	Ford	85
2	9	14	Clint Bowyer	Stewart–Haas Racing	Ford	85
3	11	3	Austin Dillon	Richard Childress Racing	Chevrolet	85
4	8	17	Chris Buescher	Roush Fenway Racing	Ford	85
5	20	13	Ty Dillon	Germain Racing	Chevrolet	85
6	4	47	Ricky Stenhouse Jr.	JTG Daugherty Racing	Chevrolet	85
7	1	34	Michael McDowell	Front Row Motorsports	Ford	85
8	19	38	John Hunter Nemechek (R)	Front Row Motorsports	Ford	85
9	21	32	Corey LaJoie	Go Fas Racing	Ford	85
10	5	8	Tyler Reddick (R)	Richard Childress Racing	Chevrolet	85
11	3	95	Christopher Bell (R)	Leavine Family Racing	Toyota	85
12	18	96	Daniel Suárez	Gaunt Brothers Racing	Toyota	85
13	12	37	Ryan Preece	JTG Daugherty Racing	Chevrolet	85
14	13	27	J. J. Yeley (i)	Rick Ware Racing	Ford	85
15	15	15	Brennan Poole (R)	Premium Motorsports	Chevrolet	85
16	14	53	Garrett Smithley (i)	Rick Ware Racing	Chevrolet	85
17	16	00	Quin Houff (R)	StarCom Racing	Chevrolet	83
18	17	51	Joey Gase (i)	Petty Ware Racing	Ford	76
19	7	24	William Byron	Hendrick Motorsports	Chevrolet	70 ^{a}
20	2	10	Aric Almirola	Stewart–Haas Racing	Ford	35 ^{b}
21	6	43	Bubba Wallace	Richard Petty Motorsports	Chevrolet	17
^aWinner of the second segment.^bWinner of the first segment. By rule, when a driver wins a segment, he exits the race and immediately advances to the All-Star Race feature.
Official NASCAR All Star Open race results

== All-Star Race ==
=== All-Star Race results ===
Pos	Grid	No.	Driver	Team	Manufacturer	Laps
1	13	9	Chase Elliott	Hendrick Motorsports	Chevrolet	140
2	10	18	Kyle Busch	Joe Gibbs Racing	Toyota	140
3	5	4	Kevin Harvick	Stewart–Haas Racing	Ford	140
4	9	2	Brad Keselowski	Team Penske	Ford	140
5	15	11	Denny Hamlin	Joe Gibbs Racing	Toyota	140
6	3	12	Ryan Blaney	Team Penske	Ford	140
7	12	22	Joey Logano	Team Penske	Ford	140
8	2	88	Alex Bowman	Hendrick Motorsports	Chevrolet	140
9	17	10	Aric Almirola	Stewart–Haas Racing	Ford	140
10	1*	19	Martin Truex Jr.	Joe Gibbs Racing	Toyota	140
11	16	20	Erik Jones	Joe Gibbs Racing	Toyota	140
12	18	24	William Byron	Hendrick Motorsports	Chevrolet	140
13	19	21	Matt DiBenedetto	Wood Brothers Racing	Ford	140
14	4	77	Justin Haley (i)	Spire Motorsports	Chevrolet	140
15	20	14	Clint Bowyer	Stewart–Haas Racing	Ford	140
16	8	41	Cole Custer (R)	Stewart–Haas Racing	Ford	140
17	14	48	Jimmie Johnson	Hendrick Motorsports	Chevrolet	140
18	6	42	Matt Kenseth	Chip Ganassi Racing	Chevrolet	140
19	11	6	Ryan Newman	Roush Fenway Racing	Ford	140
20	7	1	Kurt Busch	Chip Ganassi Racing	Chevrolet	140
Official NASCAR All-Star Race results

- Because of multiple pre-race inspection fails, Martin Truex Jr. was moved to the last starting position during the pace laps.

== Media ==
=== Television ===
Fox Sports was the television broadcaster of the race in the United States. Lap-by-lap announcer, Mike Joy and Jeff Gordon covered the race from the Fox Sports studio in Charlotte. Regan Smith and Matt Yocum reported from pit lane. Larry McReynolds provided insight from the Fox Sports studio in Charlotte. This was also Fox Sports' last Cup race for their portion of the 2020 season as NBC Sports takes over NASCAR broadcasts for the rest of the season.

FS1 Television
Booth announcers	Pit reporters	In-race analyst
Lap-by-lap: Mike Joy; Color-commentator: Jeff Gordon	Regan Smith; Matt Yocum	Larry McReynolds

=== Radio ===
Motor Racing Network (MRN) continued their longstanding relationship with Speedway Motorsports to broadcast the race on radio. The lead announcers for the race's broadcast were Alex Hayden and Jeff Striegle. The network also implemented two announcers on each side of the track: Dave Moody in turns 1 and 2 and Kyle Rickey in turns 3 and 4. Winston Kelly and Steve Post were the network's pit lane reporters. The network's broadcast was also simulcast on Sirius XM NASCAR Radio.

MRN Radio
Booth announcers	Turn announcers	Pit reporters
Lead announcer: Alex Hayden; Announcer: Jeff Striegle	Turns 1 & 2: Dave Moody; Turns 3 & 4: Kyle Rickey	Winston Kelly; Steve Post
