= Terry Labonte =

American racing driver (born 1956)

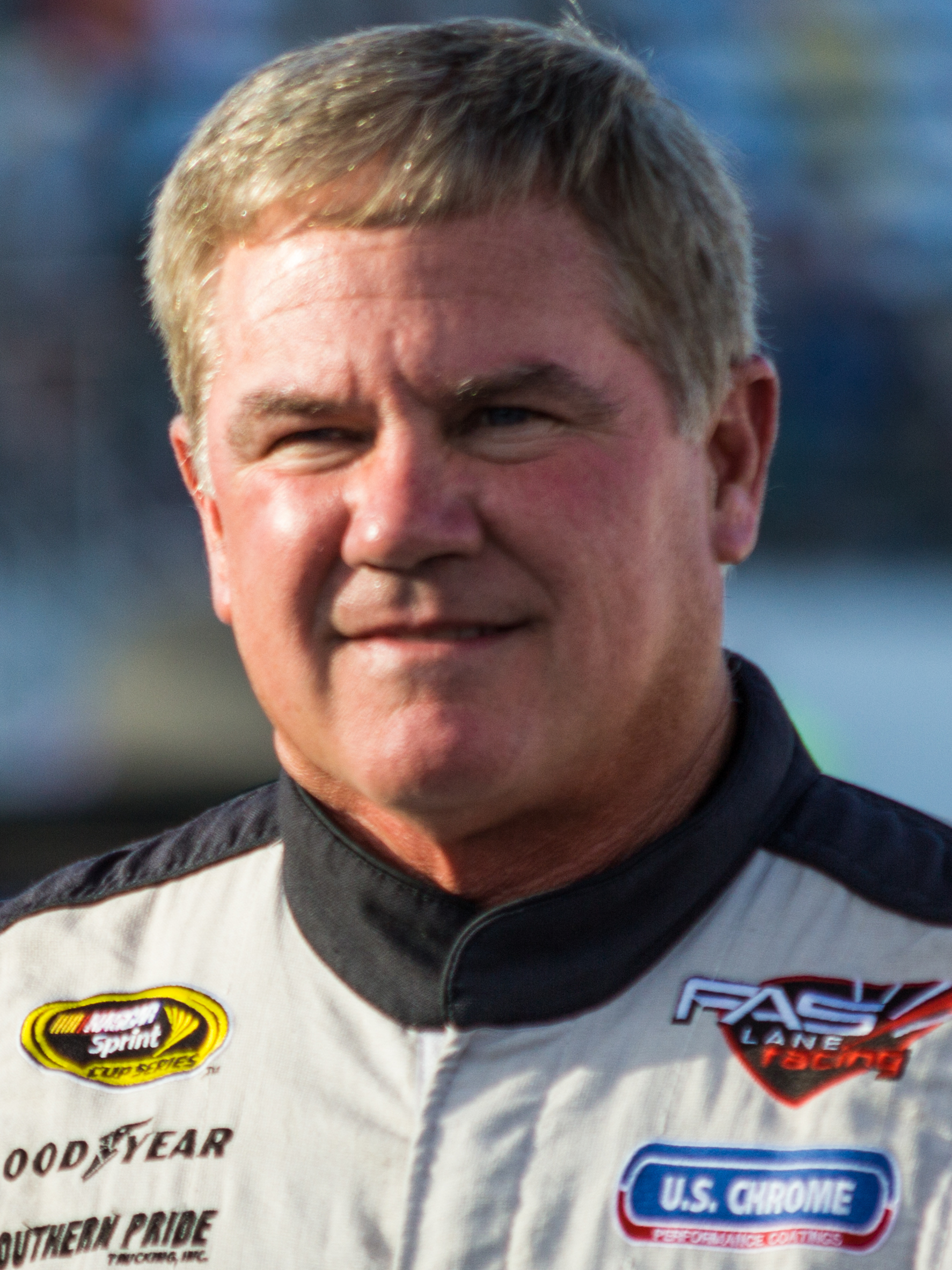
- Labonte in 2013
- Born: Terrance Lee Labonte; November 16, 1956 (age 69); Corpus Christi, Texas, U.S.
- Achievements: 1984, 1996 Winston Cup Series Champion; 1989 IROC Champion; 1993 IROC Champion (Assist); 1980, 2003 Southern 500 Winner; 1988, 1999 The Winston Winner; 1985 Busch Clash Winner; Holds all-time Cup Series record for longest drought between Cup Series Championships (12 years)
- Awards: NASCAR Hall Of Fame (2016); Named one of NASCAR's 50 Greatest Drivers (1998); National Quarter Midget Hall of Fame (1989); Motorsports Hall of Fame of America (2017); Named one of NASCAR's 75 Greatest Drivers (2023)

NASCAR Cup Series career
- 890 races run over 37 years
- 2014 position: 40th
- Best finish: 1st (1984, 1996)
- First race: 1978 Southern 500 (Darlington)
- Last race: 2014 GEICO 500 (Talladega)
- First win: 1980 Southern 500 (Darlington)
- Last win: 2003 Southern 500 (Darlington)
Wins	Top tens	Poles
22	361	27

NASCAR O'Reilly Auto Parts Series career
- 124 races run over 11 years
- Best finish: 13th (1996)
- First race: 1985 Miller 400 (Charlotte)
- Last race: 2000 MBNA Platinum 200 (Dover)
- First win: 1985 Miller 400 (Charlotte)
- Last win: 1999 Touchstone Energy 300 (Talladega)
Wins	Top tens	Poles
11	68	4

NASCAR FedEx Freight Truck Series career
- 3 races run over 1 year
- Best finish: 37th (1995)
- First race: 1995 Skoal Bandit Copper World Classic (Phoenix)
- Last race: 1995 Fas Mart Supertruck Shootout (Richmond)
- First win: 1995 Fas Mart Supertruck Shootout (Richmond)
Wins	Top tens	Poles
1	3	1
- Statistics up to date as of October 19, 2014.

Terrance Lee Labonte (born November 16, 1956), nicknamed "Texas Terry" or "the Iceman", is an American former stock car driver. He raced from 1978 to 2014 in the former NASCAR Winston Cup and Sprint Cup Series (now called the NASCAR Cup Series). A two-time Cup Series champion in 1984 and 1996 and the 1989 IROC champion, he is the older brother of 2000 Cup Series champion Bobby Labonte, and the father of former Nationwide Series driver Justin Labonte. He also co-owns a Chevrolet dealership in Greensboro, North Carolina with Rick Hendrick. He appeared on the CBS series The Dukes of Hazzard in 1984, where he played an unnamed pit crew member.

== Early life ==
Terry Labonte was born in Corpus Christi, Texas, in 1956. He was introduced to racing at an early age through his father, who had worked on race cars as a hobby for his friends. He started racing quarter midgets when he was seven and won a national championship at nine before moving onto the local short tracks in a stock car as a teenager. He graduated from Mary Carroll High School in 1975. Driving on both dirt and asphalt, he won track championships in his hometown, in Houston, and in San Antonio between 1975 and 1977. During this time he also met Louisiana businessman Billy Hagan.

== Racing career ==
=== Hagan Racing ===
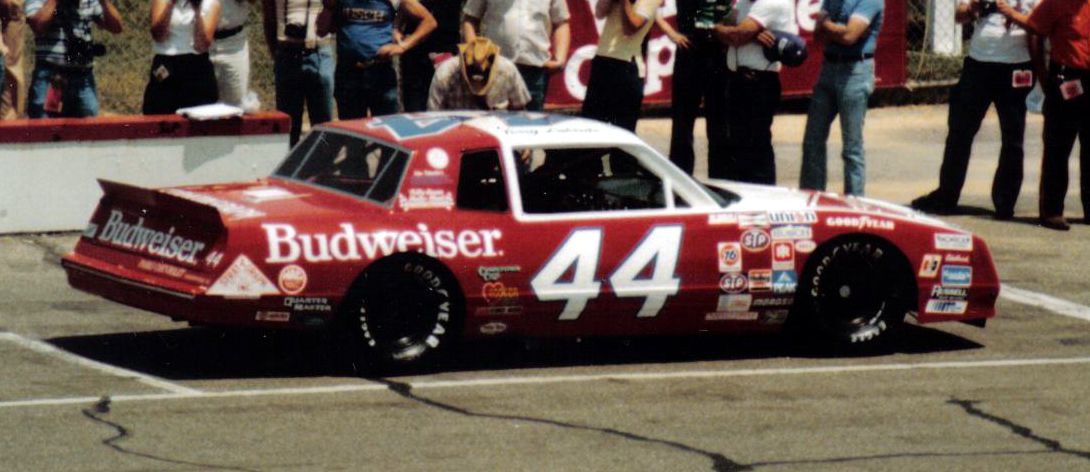
1983 racecar

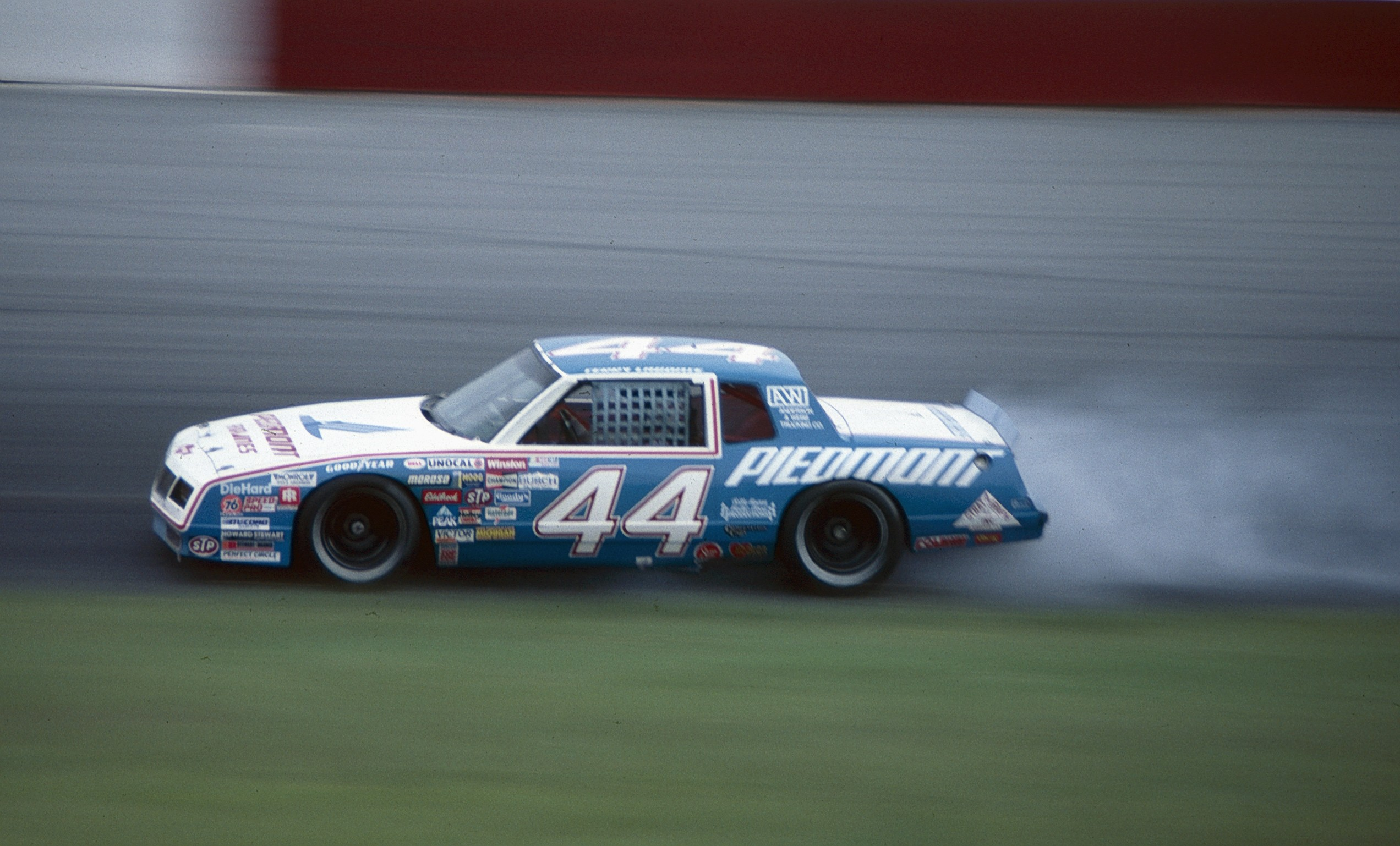
1985 racecar

Labonte's first NASCAR race came in 1978 at Darlington Raceway. He qualified 19th in the No. 92 Duck Industries Chevrolet and finished fourth that weekend. He ran four more races that season and had an additional two top-ten finishes. In 1979, he competed for NASCAR Winston Cup Rookie of the Year honors along with Dale Earnhardt, Harry Gant, and Joe Millikan while driving the No. 44 Stratagraph Chevrolet for Hagan. Although Labonte failed to win the top rookie award, he was one of three rookies to finish in the top-ten in points. He ended the season with thirteen top-ten finishes. The following year, he won his first career Winston Cup race on Labor Day weekend at Darlington. He won $222,501 in prize money for the year and finished eighth in the final points standings.

Labonte failed to return to victory lane over the next two years but didn't finish outside the top-five in the final standings. He won his second career race in 1983 in the Budweiser Chevrolet. In 1984, his team received sponsorship from Piedmont Airlines and he won races at Riverside International Raceway and Bristol Motor Speedway as well as clinching his first Winston Cup championship. He dropped to seventh in the final points in 1985. During that season, he made his Busch Series debut at Charlotte in the No. 17 Pontiac owned by Darrell Waltrip and won the 400 miles (640 km) race. Waltrip asked Labonte to drive after deciding to focus his driving priorities solely on Winston Cup racing during what would be Waltrip's 307-point gain over Bill Elliott in the final eight races of the 1985 season.

=== Junior Johnson & Associates ===
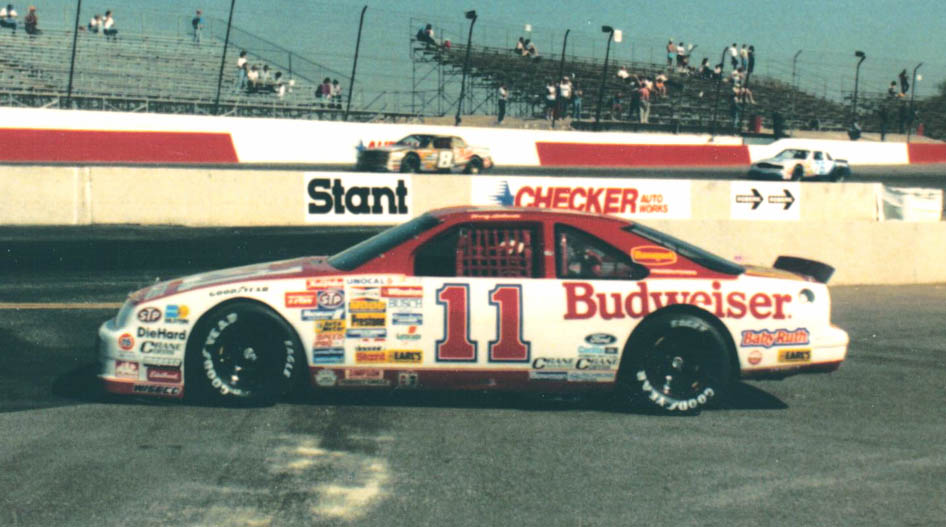
1989 No. 11 car

Labonte fell back to 12th in the standings in 1986. Before season's end, he announced he was leaving Hagan's team to drive the No. 11 Budweiser Chevrolet for Junior Johnson's team beginning the following year. In his first season with this team, he earned four poles and won the Holly Farms 400, leaping up to third in the final standings. He followed that up with a fourth-place points finish in 1988, as well as winning The Winston. In 1989, the team switched to Ford Thunderbirds. Despite two wins during the season, he fell back to tenth in the championship.

=== Precision Products Racing ===
In 1990, Labonte signed with Leo Jackson's Precision Products Racing team to drive the No. 1 Skoal Classic Oldsmobile. He had four top-fives and nine top-tens and finished 15th in the points standings.

Labonte scrapped plans for 1990 to run a self-owned independent team, because he couldn't land a full sponsorship, the News-Record of Greensboro, N.C. reported in 1990, and he signed to the Precision Products Racing team.

=== Return to Hagan Racing ===
Labonte came back to Hagan Racing to drive the No. 94 Sunoco Oldsmobile in 1991, winning his first pole since 1988. In December 1990, he won the rain-shortened NASCAR Christmas 400 at the Calder Park Thunderdome in Australia for the team. He began 1992 with finishes inside the top-eight in each of the first eight races. He had a total of four top-five finishes and sixteen top-ten finishes, ending the season eighth in points. In 1993, the team switched to the No. 14 Kellogg's Chevrolet. While he had ten top-tens, for the first time in his career, Labonte failed to finish a race in the top-five and he dropped to 18th in points.

On July 1, 1993, it was announced that Labonte would be leaving Hagan Racing at the end of the season to drive for Hendrick Motorsports in 1994.

=== Hendrick Motorsports ===
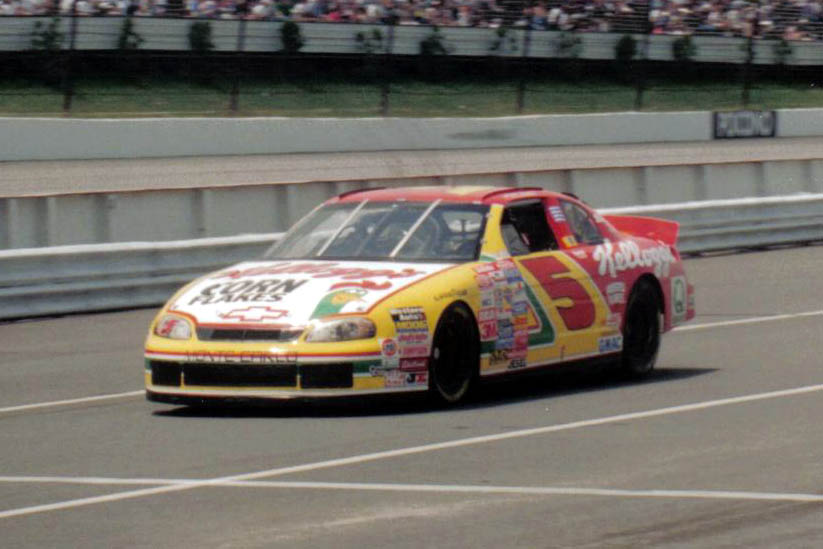
1997 racecar

Terry Labonte at Richmond in 1998.

After leaving Hagan Racing in 1993, Labonte was signed to Hendrick Motorsports in 1994, where he began driving the No. 5 Kellogg's Chevrolet Lumina. In 1995, the team switched to Chevrolet Monte Carlos and won three races including the fall Goody's 500 event at Bristol, where the front of Labonte's car was wrecked after Dale Earnhardt crashed into him in the final lap. In 1996, he broke Richard Petty's streak for consecutive races after winning at North Wilkesboro. Despite only two victories, Labonte went on to win the championship, a record-setting twelve years after his first. Driving with a broken hand during the last two races of the season, Labonte and his younger brother Bobby were able to perform a dual victory lap at Atlanta Motor Speedway in the last race of the season; Bobby won the race and Terry won the championship on this race, making it the only time a driver and his sibling won the race and the championship at the same time.

Labonte posted twenty top-ten finishes in 1997 and collected his only win of the season at the fall race at Talladega Superspeedway. In 1998, it was the final season to have Labonte's trademark mustache, where he went on to win the Pontiac Excitement 400 and finished ninth in points. With a win at his home track at Texas Motor Speedway and in the Sprint All-Star Race XV in 1999, Labonte finished 12th in points, the first time he had finished outside the top-ten since 1993.

Labonte shaved his mustache off in 1999, where his most famous race was the 1999 Goody's Headache Powder 500 at Bristol. He was involved in one of the most infamous and controversial NASCAR finishes ever, when he was spun out by a lapped Darrell Waltrip while leading with ten laps to go when he slowed the field under caution. Labonte pitted for four tires and quickly recovered and was leading with one lap remaining. However, Dale Earnhardt, who was in second at the time, wrecked Labonte half-way to the checkered flag and won. Labonte finished 8th while wrecking. In victory lane, Dale Earnhardt maintained that it wasn't on purpose. In a post-race interview, Labonte didn't buy Earnhardt's excuses, angrily stating "[Earnhardt] never intends to take anybody out...it just happens that way."

The 2000 season saw Labonte's consecutive start streak broken at 655 after he suffered inner ear injuries in the Pepsi 400 and was forced to miss the Brickyard 400 and the Global Crossing @ The Glen. 2000 was also his first winless season since 1993. His younger brother Bobby won that year's championship. He began 2001 with two top-six finishes in the first seven races but continued to fall in the points standings. Labonte's trademark mustache returned mid-season but his fortunes did not change, eventually finishing the 2001 season in 23rd place. Even though he dropped back to 24th in 2002 with one top-five finish and four top-tens, 2002 marked a definite turning point for Labonte with the appointment of veteran crew chief, Jim Long, to the team.

In 2003, Labonte won his first pole since 2000 at Richmond and won the Mountain Dew Southern 500 where 23 years earlier he won his first in 1980 at Darlington Raceway after leading the last 33 laps. This was only his second win in a crown jewel event (the other being in the Southern 500 at Darlington Raceway in 1980). That helped lead him to a tenth-place spot in points. About 90% of the NASCAR fans have labeled the 2003 Southern 500 win as the most popular win of 2003.

The 2004 season was much more of a struggle for Labonte, and Hendrick Motorsports announced Kyle Busch as Labonte's replacement when he retired. Late in the 2004-season, Labonte announced that 2004 would be his final full-time year on the circuit and would run part-time schedules for the next two years. The part-time schedule was nicknamed "Shifting Gears: Lone Star Style".

=== Semi-retirement years ===
==== Hendrick Motorsports ====
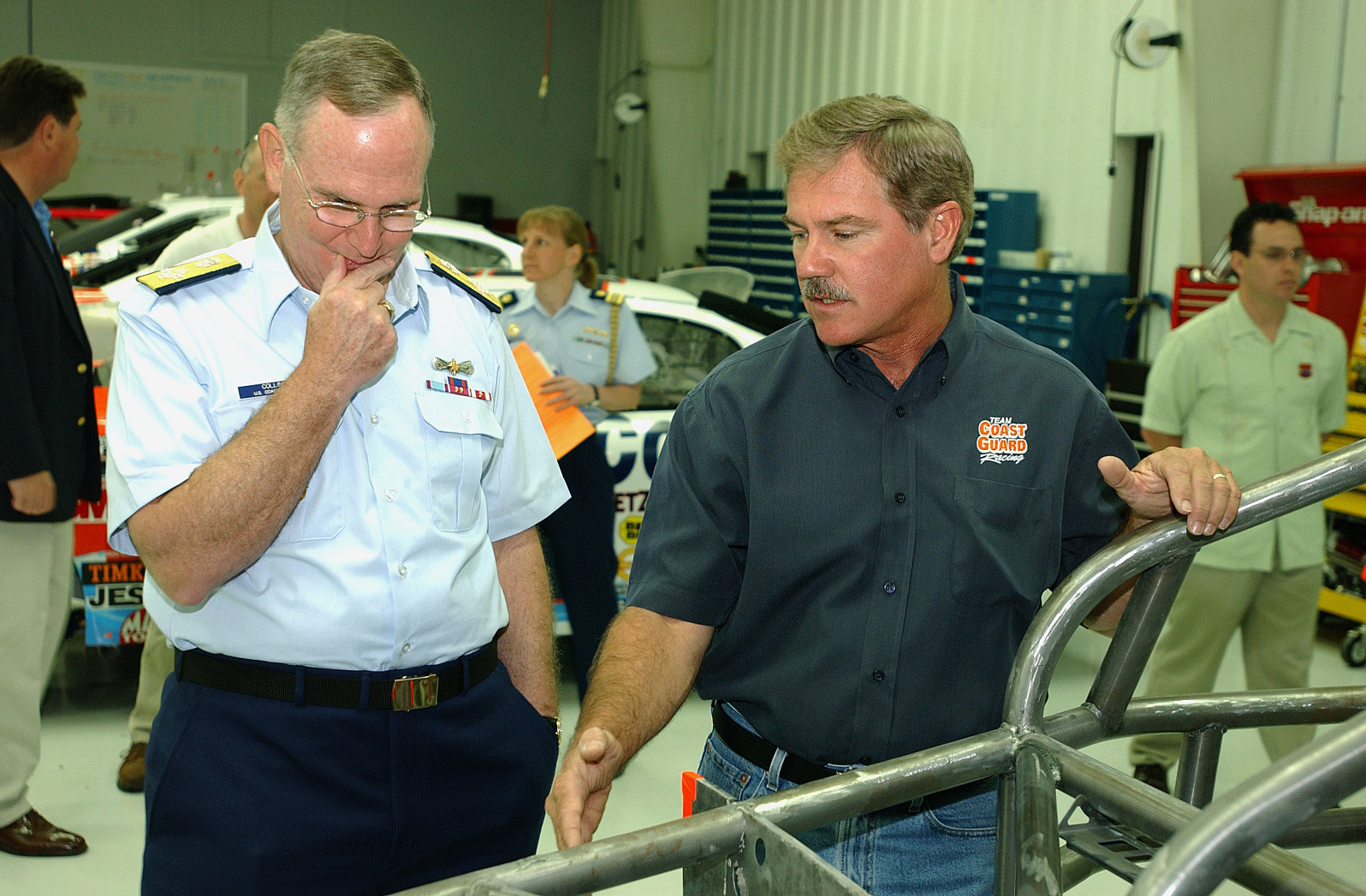
Labonte in 2005

Labonte began his semi-retirement in 2005. He borrowed the number 44, his former number, from Petty Enterprises and ran Hendrick's No. 44 research and development car with some sponsorship from Kellogg's, Pizza Hut, and GMAC. His best finish in 2005 for Hendrick Motorsports came at Pocono Raceway, where he finished 12th.

Labonte also ran ten races with Hendrick Motorsports research and development car No. 44 in 2006.

==== Joe Gibbs Racing ====
Labonte also drove five races in the No. 11 FedEx Chevrolet for Joe Gibbs Racing following the release of Jason Leffler, with a top finish of ninth at Richmond.

==== Hall of Fame Racing ====
Labonte began the 2006 season driving the No. 96 Texas Instruments/DLP HDTV Chevrolet Monte Carlo car for Hall of Fame Racing, a new team started by former Dallas Cowboys quarterbacks Roger Staubach and Troy Aikman. Labonte's past-champion provisional guaranteed the team a starting spot in the first five races. Labonte's finishes in those races left the team 30th in points, sealing a spot for the team in each race as long as they remained in the Top 35. Tony Raines took over the driving duties for the No. 96 car and ran for the rest of the season, with the exception of the road-course races at Infineon Raceway and Watkins Glen International. Labonte's best finish of 2006 came at Infineon, where he finished third due to a fuel mileage gamble by Philippe Lopez, the crew chief of the No. 96 DLP/Texas Instruments Chevrolet.

==== Michael Waltrip Racing ====
During the 2007 season, Labonte drove three races for Michael Waltrip Racing, both road course events, and the Allstate 400 at the Brickyard, in the No.55 NAPA Auto Parts Toyota Camry. His best finish in the No. 55 was 30th twice, at Indianapolis and Watkins Glen.

==== Petty Enterprises ====
On May 11, 2008, it was announced that Labonte would drive the No. 45 car of Petty Enterprises for six races in the middle of the 2008 Sprint Cup season, replacing Kyle Petty on a temporary basis. Labonte was reunited with brother Bobby, who was the regular driver of the No. 43 for Petty. Labonte posted two solid top-20 runs in the six-race tenure, a 16th at Daytona and a 17th at Infineon, both the best finishes for the No. 45 car this season. It was later announced that he would drive for Petty again in the Brickyard 400. Labonte was back in the No. 45 car for Petty Enterprises when the Sprint Cup Series went to the Michigan International Speedway for the 3M Performance 400 on August 17, 2008. He would be back in the No. 45 car again for the AMP Energy 500 at the Talladega Superspeedway for the final time in the 2008 Sprint Cup Season. He would go on to post a 17th-place finish, even after sustaining severe damage in one of the multi-car accidents. Labonte's results in 2008 proved far better on average than the previous three seasons, while driving also part-time.

==== Gillett Evernham Motorsports ====
Labonte drove the No. 10 Valvoline car in place of Patrick Carpentier in The American Red Cross Pennsylvania 500.

==== Prism Motorsports ====
It was reported first on January 23, 2009, that Labonte would attempt to make the Daytona 500 for Prism Motorsports, driving the No. 66 Window World Toyota. The team announced they planned to race full-time with Dave Blaney after Daytona. Labonte started 43rd, and went a lap down. He managed to get his lap back and fought up to finish 24th in the rain-shortened event.

==== Carter/Simo Racing ====
Starting at Indianapolis in 2009, Labonte drove the No. 08 Toyota for Carter/Simo Racing for four races.

==== Stavola Labonte Racing/Prism Motorsports ====
It was reported that Labonte would be forming a new team with Bill Stavola, formerly the co-owner of Stavola Brothers Racing. In the team's debut, Labonte barely missed making the field at Richmond, but took the Gander Mountain sponsorship to the No. 55 Prism Motorsports car which had qualified 37th. Labonte would finish 40th in the race after an accident forced him out. It is not known for sure what caused the demise of Stavola Labonte Racing, as the team seemed to dissolve sometime after the 2010 season.

==== Whitney Motorsports ====
Labonte also raced at Phoenix in 2010 for Whitney Motorsports.

==== FAS Lane Racing/Go Fas Racing ====
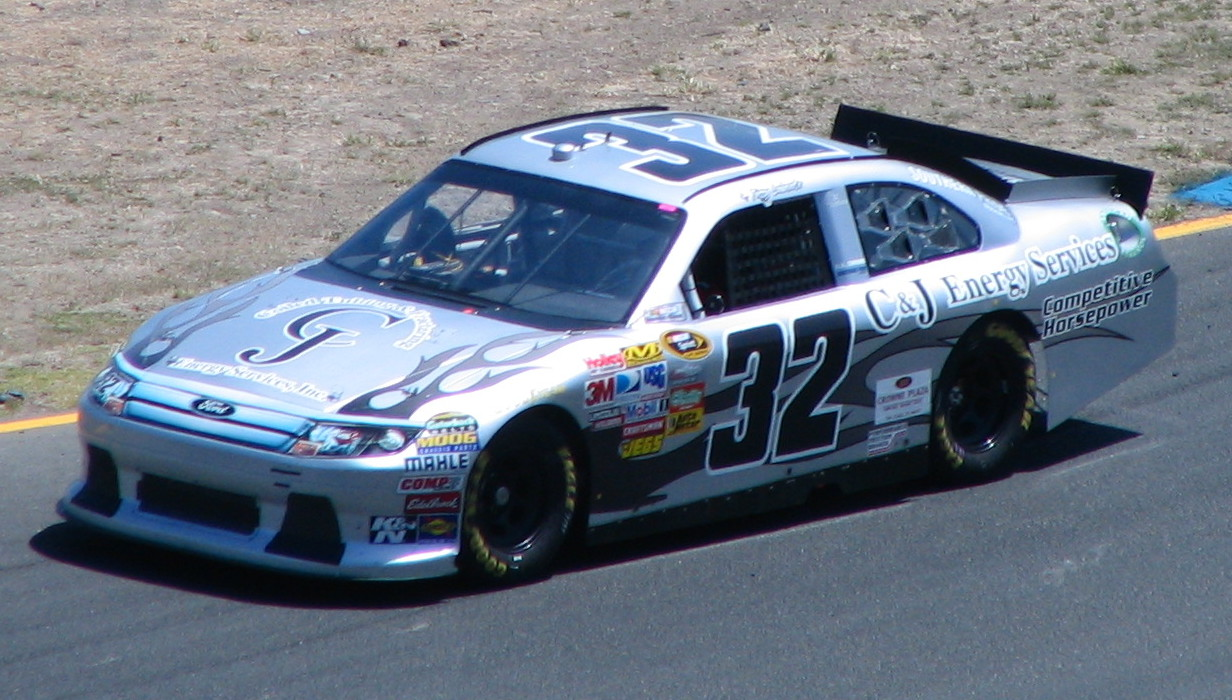
Labonte's No. 32 car at Sonoma Raceway in 2011

Entering 2011, it was announced that Frank Stoddard would be starting his own team, FAS Lane Racing, with Labonte driving the No. 32 U.S. Chrome Ford Fusion in the Daytona 500. Labonte started 43rd and finished a respectable 15th. At the time, Labonte was semi-retired, but competed in seven additional races over the course of the year in the No. 32.

Labonte returned to Stoddard's 32 car in 2012 where he would run all four restrictor plate races with C&J Energy Services as the sponsor. He finished with three Top 20's out of the four starts, including a season-best 16th in the October race at Talladega Superspeedway. Labonte led the 2012 Daytona 500 briefly before being spun by Marcos Ambrose. He would continue on to finish eighteenth.

In 2013, Labonte would run five races for FAS Lane Racing, posting a best finish of 19th. In addition to running all four restrictor plate races, he ran at Bristol Motor Speedway in March, finishing 25th.

In 2014, FAS Lane Racing would merge with Go Green Racing to form Go Fas Racing, and announced that Labonte would again return to the No. 32 car for all four superspeedway events. He ran as high as sixth in the Daytona 500 before being swept up in a late crash and finishing 20th. Before the race, Labonte called this his final Daytona 500 start. At the 2014 Coke Zero 400, his final start at Daytona, he dodged two huge wrecks and finished a solid 11th-place after the race was called 112 laps in due to rain.

On October 17, Labonte announced the GEICO 500 was to be his 890th and final start. To commemorate the occasion, Go Fas Racing designed a car split into three designs: the Kellogg's design from his 1996 title run on the driver side, the Piedmont Airlines design from his 1984 championship year on the passenger side, and the Duck Industries design from his early career in the center. However, NASCAR did not allow the scheme, due to a rule stating cars must have the same colors on both the driver side and passenger side of the car for safety reasons; the team would switch to the former design, while being allowed to retain the center. Labonte qualified ninth, but because of the unapproved paint scheme, was forced to start at the tail end of the field. He would finish in 33rd place, one lap down in his final race.

== Competition in other series ==
In addition to his 22 wins in the Sprint Cup Series, Labonte has won eleven races in the Nationwide Series and one in the Craftsman Truck Series, as well as three all-star races: the Busch Clash in 1985 and The Winston (now the Sprint All-Star Challenge) in 1988 and 1999. He also won the IROC championship in 1989 with one win, and assisted the late Davey Allison to the 1993 IROC championship by driving his car to a sixth place finish in the final race of the season.

Including his two championship seasons, he has finished in the top-ten in the year-end standings seventeen times, and his top-five and top-ten totals approach 25 percent and 50 percent, respectively, of his total races. Labonte holds the record for most seasons between championships, with twelve seasons in between his 1984 & 1996 championships.

Labonte also collected class wins at the two most prestigious endurance races in the United States, the 24 Hours of Daytona and 12 Hours of Sebring, driving a GTO-class Chevrolet Camaro during the 1984 IMSA GT Championship season. In his career, Labonte started 32 Daytona 500s, tied with Richard Petty for second-most all-time behind Dave Marcis.

== Honors ==
=== NASCAR Hall of Fame ===
On February 21, 2014, Labonte was nominated for the NASCAR Hall of Fame Class of 2015, along with nineteen other candidates. This occurred not long after NASCAR revised the rules allowing current drivers eligibility into the Hall provided they are at least 55 years of age or have 30+ years of NASCAR experience.

After being passed over as a first-ballot inductee for the class of 2015, Labonte was inducted into the NASCAR Hall of Fame Class of 2016 on May 20, 2015. Joining Labonte in the 2016 class were Speedway Motorsports Executive Chairman Bruton Smith, and drivers Curtis Turner, Bobby Isaac, and Jerry Cook.

On January 26, 2017, Labonte was named to the Motorsports Hall of Fame of America.

=== Other ===
In 1998, the senior Labonte was named as one of NASCAR's 50 Greatest Drivers. A park was renamed for the Labonte brothers in their hometown of Corpus Christi in 2001, and they were chosen for entry into the Texas Sports Hall of Fame in 2002. Labonte supports a variety of charities and due to his efforts, the Ronald McDonald House in Corpus Christi, the Victory Junction Gang Camp near Randleman, North Carolina, and the Hendrick Marrow Program all have benefited. In 2001, Labonte was inducted into the Texas Sports Hall of Fame.

== TV and movie appearances ==
In the 1983 Hal Needham/Burt Reynolds movie Stroker Ace, Labonte appeared as himself (but credited as a "NASCAR Driver"), along with many other contemporary drivers.

== Personal life ==
Labonte is the older brother of the 2000 Winston Cup Series Champion Bobby Labonte.

Labonte has been married to his wife Kim since 1978, they have two children Justin and Kristy along with four grandchildren. He splits his time between Texas and North Carolina, where he is the co-owner of a Chevrolet car dealership with Hendrick in Greensboro. Labonte also has a marketing company that was created from a sponsorship deal he acquired during his racing career in the 1990s when Kellogg's used his No. 5 Chevy to promote products Frosted Flakes and Tony the Tiger.

Labonte is an avid outdoorsman's and was a longtime hunting partner with Dale Earnhardt. He has also been involved in charitable causes with him and his brother hosting the annual Labonte Brothers Celebrity Clay Shoot, which benefits Speedway Children's Charities in Texas.

== Motorsports career results ==
=== NASCAR ===
(key) (Bold – Pole position awarded by qualifying time. Italics – Pole position earned by points standings or practice time. * – Most laps led.)

==== Cup Series ====
NASCAR Sprint Cup Series results
Year	Team	No.	Make	1	2	3	4	5	6	7	8	9	10	11	12	13	14	15	16	17	18	19	20	21	22	23	24	25	26	27	28	29	30	31	32	33	34	35	36	NSCC	Pts	Ref
1978	Hagan Racing	92	Chevy	RSD	DAY	RCH	CAR	ATL	BRI	DAR	NWS	MAR	TAL	DOV	CLT	NSV	RSD	MCH	DAY	NSV	POC	TAL	MCH	BRI	DAR; 4	RCH; 7	DOV	MAR; 9	NWS	CLT; 24	CAR	ATL; 13	ONT							39th	659	
1979	Hagan Racing	44	Chevy	RSD; 35			RCH; 8	ATL; 25	NWS; 15	BRI; 7	DAR; 29	MAR; 9		NSV; 9	DOV; 6	CLT; 7	TWS; 5	RSD; 18	MCH; 25		NSV; 25	POC; 23		MCH; 26	BRI; 8	DAR; 3	RCH; 17	DOV; 25	MAR; 9	CLT; 15	NWS; 6	CAR; 27	ATL; 7							10th	3615	
1979	Hagan Racing	44	Buick		DAY; 16	CAR; 15							TAL; 9							DAY; 29			TAL; 33																	10th	3615	
1979	Hagan Racing	44	Olds																															ONT; 13						10th	3615	
1980	Hagan Racing	44	Chevy	RSD; 7		RCH; 24	CAR; 10	ATL; 15	BRI; 10	DAR; 32	NWS; 22	MAR; 23		NSV; 7	DOV; 5	CLT; 3	TWS; 5	RSD; 33	MCH; 11		NSV; 22	POC; 6		MCH; 11	BRI; 23	DAR; 1	RCH; 8	DOV; 28	NWS; 7	MAR; 7	CLT; 31	CAR; 4	ATL; 5	ONT; 8						8th	3766	
1980	Hagan Racing	44	Olds		DAY; 6								TAL; 32							DAY; 32			TAL; 31																	8th	3766	
1981	Hagan Racing	44	Chevy	RSD; 2																																				4th	4052	
1981	Hagan Racing	44	Buick		DAY; 40	RCH; 26	CAR; 21	**ATL**; 19	BRI; 7	NWS; 7	DAR; 14	MAR; 5	TAL; 7	NSV; 6	DOV; 8	CLT; 14	**TWS**; 23	RSD; 22	MCH; 11	DAY; 8	NSV; 5	POC; 13	TAL; 3	MCH; 14	BRI; 3	DAR; 4	RCH; 4	DOV; 29	MAR; 9	NWS; 30	CLT; 23	CAR; 7	ATL; 7	RSD; 3						4th	4052	
1982	Hagan Racing	44	Buick	DAY; 4			ATL; 8		DAR; 6			TAL; 2			CLT; 34		**RSD**; 2*	MCH; 28	DAY; 27		POC; 3	TAL; 5	MCH; 21	BRI; 4		RCH; 6	DOV; 27		CLT; 16		CAR; 4	ATL; 8	RSD; 27							3rd	4211	
1982	Hagan Racing	44	Chevy		RCH; 5	BRI; 4		CAR; 2		NWS; 2	**MAR**; 20		NSV; 2	DOV; 4		POC; 5				NSV; 2					DAR; 35			NWS; 3		MAR; 4										3rd	4211	
1983	Hagan Racing	44	Chevy	DAY; 6	RCH; 22	CAR; 24	ATL; 8	DAR; 36	NWS; 6	MAR; 6	TAL; 6	NSV; 8	DOV; 31	BRI; 6	CLT; 33	RSD; 31	POC; 9	**MCH**; 5*	DAY; 5	NSV; 11	POC; 12	TAL; 29	**MCH**; 4	BRI; 5	DAR; 5	RCH; 5	**DOV**; 4	MAR; 24	NWS; 5	CLT; 4	CAR; 1	ATL; 4	RSD; 7							5th	4004	
1984	Hagan Racing	44	Chevy	DAY; 12	RCH; 3	CAR; 2	ATL; 7	BRI; 2	NWS; 4	DAR; 2	MAR; 24	TAL; 25	NSV; 8	DOV; 3	CLT; 30	**RSD**; 1*	POC; 3	MCH; 31	DAY; 7	NSV; 6	POC; 4	TAL; 3	MCH; 2*	BRI; 1*	DAR; 8	RCH; 8	DOV; 2	MAR; 2	CLT; 5	NWS; 9	CAR; 3	ATL; 30	**RSD**; 3							1st	4508	
1985	Hagan Racing	44	Chevy	DAY; 25	RCH; 6	**CAR**; 3*	ATL; 6	BRI; 3	DAR; 4	NWS; 7	MAR; 6	TAL; 7	**DOV**; 16	CLT; 5	RSD; 1*	POC; 28	MCH; 22	DAY; 8	POC; 26	TAL; 39	MCH; 9	BRI; 29	DAR; 7	RCH; 2*	DOV; 24	MAR; 27	NWS; 3	CLT; 33	**CAR**; 12	ATL; 6	**RSD**; 2*									7th	3683	
1986	Hagan Racing	44	Olds	DAY; 2	RCH; 15	**CAR**; 1*	ATL; 3	BRI; 7	DAR; 32	NWS; 27	MAR; 3	TAL; 29	DOV; 17	CLT; 11	RSD; 12	POC; 35	MCH; 12	DAY; 19	POC; 6	TAL; 38	GLN; 32	MCH; 12			RCH; 18	DOV; 19	MAR; 15	NWS; 10	CLT; 15	CAR; 31	ATL; 8	RSD; 10								12th	3473	
1986	Hagan Racing	44	Chevy																				BRI; 2	DAR; 21																12th	3473	
1987	Junior Johnson & Associates	11	Chevy	DAY; 18	CAR; 8	RCH; 5	ATL; 4	DAR; 32	NWS; 8	BRI; 9	MAR; 5	TAL; 2	CLT; 6	DOV; 3	**POC**; 37	**RSD**; 4	MCH; 28	DAY; 10	POC; 6	TAL; 6	**GLN**; 2	MCH; 33	**BRI**; 4	DAR; 5	RCH; 8	DOV; 32	MAR; 3	NWS; 1*	CLT; 4	CAR; 4	RSD; 8	ATL; 28								3rd	4007	
1988	Junior Johnson & Associates	11	Chevy	DAY; 5	RCH; 9	CAR; 31	ATL; 4	DAR; 23	BRI; 16	**NWS**; 1	MAR; 4	TAL; 4	CLT; 9	DOV; 12	RSD; 2	POC; 32	MCH; 3	DAY; 19	POC; 9	TAL; 14	GLN; 18	MCH; 13	BRI; 22	DAR; 8	RCH; 3	DOV; 18	MAR; 7	CLT; 10	NWS; 4	CAR; 3	PHO; 2	ATL; 8								4th	4007	
1989	Junior Johnson & Associates	11	Ford	DAY; 9	CAR; 18	ATL; 36	RCH; 30	DAR; 18	BRI; 24	NWS; 5	MAR; 5	TAL; 2	CLT; 39	DOV; 4	SON; 15	POC; 1	MCH; 14	DAY; 6	POC; 13	TAL; 1	GLN; 14	MCH; 40	BRI; 5	DAR; 33	RCH; 12	DOV; 14	MAR; 11	CLT; 11	NWS; 3	CAR; 14	PHO; 2	ATL; 40								10th	3569	
1990	Precision Products Racing	1	Olds	DAY; 2	RCH; 32	CAR; 9	ATL; 40	DAR; 14	BRI; 4	NWS; 15	MAR; 31	TAL; 6	CLT; 13	DOV; 13	SON; 35	POC; 20	MCH; 7	DAY; 4	POC; 10	TAL; 42	GLN; 14	MCH; 14	BRI; 4	DAR; 14	RCH; 17	DOV; 15	MAR; 9	NWS; 27	CLT; 17	CAR; 13	PHO; 13	ATL; 21								15th	3371	
1991	Hagan Racing	94	Olds	DAY; 13	RCH; 14	CAR; 39	ATL; 35	DAR; 15	BRI; 9	NWS; 31	MAR; 31	TAL; 37	CLT; 10	DOV; 24	SON; 6	POC; 21	MCH; 25	DAY; 41	POC; 15	TAL; 24	**GLN**; 34	MCH; 16	BRI; 9	DAR; 5	RCH; 19	DOV; 26	MAR; 6	NWS; 14	CLT; 6	CAR; 28	PHO; 12	ATL; 15								18th	3024	
1992	Hagan Racing	94	Olds	DAY; 7	CAR; 7	RCH; 8	ATL; 9	DAR; 9	BRI; 4	NWS; 9	MAR; 4		CLT; 6	DOV; 21	SON; 2	POC; 10	MCH; 38		POC; 16		GLN; 8	MCH; 23	BRI; 31	DAR; 14	RCH; 13	DOV; 7	MAR; 11	NWS; 8		CAR; 9	PHO; 16									8th	3674	
1992	Hagan Racing	94	Ford									TAL; 36						DAY; 21		TAL; 18																				8th	3674	
1992	Hagan Racing	94	Chevy																										CLT; 12			ATL; 5								8th	3674	
1993	Hagan Racing	14	Chevy	DAY; 11	CAR; 10	RCH; 24	ATL; 33	DAR; 9	BRI; 21	NWS; 6	MAR; 9	TAL; 37	SON; 9	CLT; 33	DOV; 20	POC; 32	MCH; 20	DAY; 9	NHA; 31	POC; 16	TAL; 14	GLN; 23	MCH; 29	BRI; 34	DAR; 33	RCH; 8	DOV; 8	MAR; 7	NWS; 7	CLT; 16	CAR; 15	PHO; 14	ATL; 13							18th	3280	
1994	Hendrick Motorsports	5	Chevy	DAY; 3	CAR; 17	RCH; 9	ATL; 14	DAR; 35	BRI; 24	NWS; 1	MAR; 15	TAL; 32	SON; 28	CLT; 35	DOV; 26	POC; 18	MCH; 20	DAY; 15	NHA; 11	POC; 15	TAL; 10	IND; 12	GLN; 6	MCH; 8	BRI; 33	DAR; 10	RCH; 1*	DOV; 7	MAR; 14	NWS; 2	CLT; 7	CAR; 5	PHO; 1*	ATL; 8						7th	3876	
1995	Hendrick Motorsports	5	Chevy	DAY; 8	CAR; 26	RCH; 1	ATL; 3	DAR; 34	BRI; 7	NWS; 16	MAR; 36	**TAL**; 26	SON; 5	CLT; 2	DOV; 37	POC; 1	MCH; 9	DAY; 19	NHA; 4	POC; 14	TAL; 33	IND; 13	GLN; 5	MCH; 2	BRI; 1	DAR; 19	RCH; 2	DOV; 15	MAR; 2	NWS; 4	CLT; 3	CAR; 4	PHO; 13	ATL; 13						6th	4146	
1996	Hendrick Motorsports	5	Chevy	DAY; 24*	**CAR**; 34*	**RCH**; 8	ATL; 2	DAR; 5	BRI; 2	**NWS**; 1*	MAR; 24	TAL; 4	**SON**; 5	CLT; 3	DOV; 2	POC; 7	MCH; 2	DAY; 2	NHA; 6	POC; 16	TAL; 24	IND; 3	GLN; 2	MCH; 3	BRI; 5	DAR; 26	RCH; 5	DOV; 21	MAR; 2	NWS; 5	CLT; 1*	CAR; 3	PHO; 3	ATL; 5						1st	4657	
1997	Hendrick Motorsports	5	Chevy	DAY; 2	CAR; 7	RCH; 7	ATL; 9	DAR; 13	TEX; 4*	BRI; 3	MAR; 4	SON; 3	TAL; 6	CLT; 8	DOV; 14	POC; 9	MCH; 39	CAL; 2	DAY; 2	NHA; 7	POC; 35	IND; 40	GLN; 8	MCH; 10	BRI; 7	DAR; 6	RCH; 17	NHA; 41	DOV; 37	MAR; 22	CLT; 11	TAL; 1*	CAR; 7	PHO; 11	ATL; 21					6th	4177	
1998	Hendrick Motorsports	5	Chevy	DAY; 13	CAR; 8	LVS; 15	ATL; 12	DAR; 6	BRI; 2	TEX; 6	MAR; 26	TAL; 4*	CAL; 3	CLT; 41	DOV; 10	RCH; 1	MCH; 19	POC; 12	SON; 42	NHA; 14	POC; 31	IND; 9	GLN; 40	MCH; 36	BRI; 13	NHA; 39	DAR; 25	RCH; 21	DOV; 18	MAR; 6	CLT; 38	TAL; 3	DAY; 6	PHO; 10	CAR; 8	ATL; 8				9th	3901	
1999	Hendrick Motorsports	5	Chevy	DAY; 38	CAR; 7	LVS; 8	ATL; 13	DAR; 11	TEX; 1*	BRI; 13	MAR; 15	TAL; 39	CAL; 9	RCH; 26	CLT; 11	DOV; 17	MCH; 23	POC; 16	SON; 29	DAY; 10	NHA; 11	POC; 6	IND; 11	GLN; 11	MCH; 26	BRI; 8	DAR; 17	RCH; 43	NHA; 31	DOV; 27	MAR; 40	CLT; 21	TAL; 34	CAR; 14	PHO; 28	HOM; 31	ATL; 40			12th	3580	
2000	Hendrick Motorsports	5	Chevy	DAY; 7	CAR; 17	LVS; 31	ATL; 15	DAR; 11	BRI; 5	**TEX**; 8	MAR; 23	TAL; 7	CAL; 33	RCH; 2	CLT; 22	DOV; 11	MCH; 26	POC; 12	SON; 27	DAY; 41	NHA; 43	POC; 11	IND	GLN	MCH; 20	BRI; 16	DAR; 15	RCH; 25	NHA; 25	DOV; 13	MAR; 17	CLT; 27	TAL; 5	CAR; 38	PHO; 17	HOM; 25	ATL; 17			17th	3433	
2001	Hendrick Motorsports	5	Chevy	DAY; 24	CAR; 29	LVS; 22	ATL; 5	DAR; 38	BRI; 6	TEX; 13	MAR; 23	TAL; 11	CAL; 30	RCH; 38	CLT; 23	DOV; 17	MCH; 26	POC; 31	SON; 36	DAY; 40	CHI; 25	NHA; 32	POC; 34	IND; 19	GLN; 21	MCH; 29	BRI; 10	DAR; 11	RCH; 38	DOV; 17	KAN; 27	CLT; 27	MAR; 34	TAL; 13	PHO; 20	CAR; 28	HOM; 11	ATL; 32	NHA; 27	23rd	3280	
2002	Hendrick Motorsports	5	Chevy	DAY; 20	CAR; 16	LVS; 38	ATL; 14	DAR; 23	BRI; 16	TEX; 10	MAR; 6	TAL; 20	CAL; 21	RCH; 33	CLT; 12	DOV; 15	POC; 38	MCH; 31	SON; 3	DAY; 14	CHI; 13	NHA; 22	POC; 9	IND; 13	GLN; 31	MCH; 33	BRI; 30	DAR; 31	RCH; 41	NHA; 30	DOV; 38	KAN; 12	TAL; 38	CLT; 21	MAR; 22	ATL; 25	CAR; 32	PHO; 26	HOM; 28	24th	3417	
2003	Hendrick Motorsports	5	Chevy	DAY; 30	CAR; 27	LVS; 16	ATL; 20	DAR; 24	BRI; 39	TEX; 16	TAL; 5	MAR; 14	CAL; 12	**RCH**; 21	CLT; 21	DOV; 10	POC; 7	MCH; 10	SON; 25	DAY; 4	CHI; 15	NHA; 20	POC; 5	IND; 19	GLN; 18	MCH; 13	BRI; 11	DAR; 1	RCH; 8	NHA; 18	DOV; 20	TAL; 22	KAN; 16	CLT; 18	MAR; 6	ATL; 33	PHO; 30	CAR; 12	HOM; 15	10th	4162	
2004	Hendrick Motorsports	5	Chevy	DAY; 20	CAR; 17	LVS; 17	ATL; 24	DAR; 19	BRI; 18	TEX; 41	MAR; 23	TAL; 25	CAL; 7	RCH; 18	CLT; 37	DOV; 7	POC; 7	MCH; 26	SON; 40	DAY; 8	CHI; 6	NHA; 16	POC; 6	IND; 38	GLN; 39	MCH; 27	BRI; 15	CAL; 19	RCH; 18	NHA; 24	DOV; 27	TAL; 21	KAN; 21	CLT; 25	MAR; 25	ATL; 31	PHO; 32	DAR; 28	HOM; 31	26th	3519	
2005	Hendrick Motorsports	44	Chevy	DAY	CAL; 36	LVS	ATL	BRI; 18	MAR	TEX; 40	PHO	TAL	DAR	RCH	CLT; 38	DOV	POC; 12	MCH			CHI; 42	NHA	POC	IND; 36									KAN; 33	CLT	MAR	ATL	TEX; 31	PHO	HOM	40th	1071	
2005	Joe Gibbs Racing	11	Chevy																SON; 12	DAY					GLN; 37	MCH; 40	BRI; 27	CAL	RCH; 9	NHA	DOV	TAL								40th	1071	
2006	Hall of Fame Racing	96	Chevy	DAY; 17	CAL; 34	LVS; 24	ATL; 22	BRI; 27	MAR										SON; 3	DAY					GLN; 37	MCH	BRI													41st	1278	
2006	Hendrick Motorsports	44	Chevy							TEX; 25	PHO	TAL	RCH	DAR; 34	CLT; 33	DOV	POC; 39	MCH			CHI; 43	NHA	POC; 25	IND				CAL; 40	RCH	NHA	DOV	KAN; 38	TAL	CLT; 21	MAR	ATL	TEX; 36	PHO	HOM	41st	1278	
2007	Michael Waltrip Racing	55	Toyota	DAY	CAL	LVS	ATL	BRI	MAR	TEX	PHO	TAL	RCH	DAR	CLT	DOV	POC	MCH	SON; 35	NHA	DAY	CHI	IND; 30	POC	GLN; 30	MCH	BRI	CAL	RCH	NHA	DOV	KAN	TAL	CLT	MAR	ATL	TEX	PHO	HOM	58th	204	
2008	Petty Enterprises	45	Dodge	DAY	CAL	LVS	ATL	BRI	MAR	TEX	PHO	TAL	RCH	DAR	CLT	DOV	POC; 30	MCH; 29	SON; 17	NHA; 35	DAY; 16	CHI; 38	IND; 27			MCH; 32	BRI	CAL	RCH	NHA	DOV	KAN	TAL; 17	CLT	MAR	ATL	TEX	PHO	HOM	46th	811	
2008	Gillett Evernham Motorsports	10	Dodge																					POC; 32	GLN															46th	811	
2009	Prism Motorsports	66	Toyota	DAY; 24	CAL	LVS	ATL	BRI	MAR	TEX	PHO	TAL	RCH	DAR	CLT	DOV	POC	MCH	SON	NHA	DAY	CHI																		51st	338	
2009	Carter Simo Racing	08	Toyota																				IND; 33	POC	GLN	MCH	BRI; 40	ATL; 39	RCH	NHA	DOV	KAN	CAL	CLT; 37	MAR	TAL	TEX	PHO	HOM; 42	51st	338	
2010	Stavola Labonte Racing	10	Chevy	DAY	CAL	LVS	ATL	BRI	MAR	PHO	TEX	TAL	RCH	DAR	DOV	CLT	POC	MCH	SON	NHA	DAY	CHI	IND	POC	GLN	MCH	BRI	ATL	RCH; DNQ											68th	83	
2010	Prism Motorsports	55	Toyota																										RCH; 40	NHA	DOV	KAN	CAL	CLT	MAR	TAL	TEX			68th	83	
2010	Whitney Motorsports	81	Dodge																																			PHO; 41	HOM	68th	83	
2011	FAS Lane Racing	32	Ford	DAY; 15	PHO	LVS	BRI	CAL	MAR	TEX	TAL; 34	RCH	DAR	DOV	CLT	KAN	POC	MCH	SON; 32	DAY; 28	KEN	NHA					BRI; 33	ATL	RCH	CHI	NHA	DOV	KAN	CLT	TAL; 34	MAR	TEX	PHO	HOM	39th	102	
2011	FAS Lane Racing	23	Ford																				IND; 41	POC																39th	102	
2011	Front Row Motorsports	38	Ford																						GLN; 34	MCH														39th	102	
2012	FAS Lane Racing	32	Ford	DAY; 18	PHO	LVS	BRI	CAL	MAR	TEX	KAN	RCH	TAL; 29	DAR	CLT	DOV	POC	MCH	SON	KEN	DAY; 20	NHA	IND	POC	GLN	MCH	BRI	ATL	RCH	CHI	NHA	DOV	TAL; 16	CLT	KAN	MAR	TEX	PHO	HOM	44th	94	
2013	FAS Lane Racing	32	Ford	DAY; 26	PHO	LVS	BRI; 25	CAL	MAR	TEX	KAN	RCH	TAL; 29	DAR	CLT	DOV	POC	MCH	SON	KEN	DAY; 19	NHA	IND	POC	GLN	MCH	BRI	ATL	RCH	CHI	NHA	DOV	KAN	CLT	TAL; 35	MAR	TEX	PHO	HOM	42nd	87	
2014	Go Fas Racing	32	Ford	DAY; 20	PHO	LVS	BRI	CAL	MAR	TEX	DAR	RCH	TAL; 24	KAN	CLT	DOV	POC	MCH	SON	KEN	DAY; 11	NHA	IND	POC	GLN	MCH	BRI	ATL	RCH	CHI	NHA	DOV	KAN	CLT	TAL; 33	MAR	TEX	PHO	HOM	40th	88	

===== Daytona 500 =====
Year	Team	Manufacturer	Start	Finish
1979	Hagan Racing	Buick	19	16
1980	Hagan Racing	Oldsmobile	17	6
1981	Hagan Racing	Buick	12	40
1982	Hagan Racing	Buick	5	4
1983	Hagan Racing	Chevrolet	41	6
1984	Hagan Racing	Chevrolet	2	12
1985	Hagan Racing	Chevrolet	31	25
1986	Hagan Racing	Oldsmobile	5	2
1987	Junior Johnson & Associates	Chevrolet	14	18
1988	Junior Johnson & Associates	Chevrolet	8	5
1989	Junior Johnson & Associates	Ford	4	9
1990	Precision Products Racing	Oldsmobile	20	2
1991	Hagan Racing	Oldsmobile	31	13
1992	Hagan Racing	Oldsmobile	34	7
1993	Hagan Racing	Chevrolet	19	11
1994	Hendrick Motorsports	Chevrolet	9	3
1995	Hendrick Motorsports	Chevrolet	11	8
1996	Hendrick Motorsports	Chevrolet	5	24
1997	Hendrick Motorsports	Chevrolet	18	2
1998	Hendrick Motorsports	Chevrolet	2	13
1999	Hendrick Motorsports	Chevrolet	19	38
2000	Hendrick Motorsports	Chevrolet	25	7
2001	Hendrick Motorsports	Chevrolet	34	24
2002	Hendrick Motorsports	Chevrolet	11	20
2003	Hendrick Motorsports	Chevrolet	41	30
2004	Hendrick Motorsports	Chevrolet	38	20
2006	Hall of Fame Racing	Chevrolet	43	17
2009	Prism Motorsports	Toyota	43	24
2011	FAS Lane Racing	Ford	43	15
2012	FAS Lane Racing	Ford	43	18
2013	FAS Lane Racing	Ford	39	26
2014	Go Fas Racing	Ford	24	20

==== Busch Series ====
NASCAR Busch Series results
Year	Team	No.	Make	1	2	3	4	5	6	7	8	9	10	11	12	13	14	15	16	17	18	19	20	21	22	23	24	25	26	27	28	29	30	31	32	NBSC	Pts	Ref
1985	Darrell Waltrip Motorsports	17	Pontiac	DAY	CAR	HCY	BRI	MAR	DAR	SBO	LGY	DOV	CLT	SBO	HCY	ROU	IRP	SBO	LGY	HCY	MLW	BRI	DAR	RCH	NWS	ROU	CLT; 1	HCY	CAR	MAR						97th	0	
1986	Labonte Motorsports	44	Olds	DAY	CAR	HCY	MAR	BRI	DAR	SBO	LGY	JFC	DOV	CLT	SBO	HCY	ROU	IRP	SBO	**RAL**; 2																66th	170	
1986	Labonte Motorsports	44	Buick																		OXF; 41	SBO	HCY	LGY	ROU	BRI	DAR	RCH	DOV	MAR	ROU	CLT	CAR	MAR		66th	170	
1991	Labonte Motorsports	94	Olds	DAY	RCH	CAR	MAR	VOL	HCY	DAR	BRI	LAN	SBO	NZH	CLT; 10	DOV; 20	ROU	HCY	MYB	**GLN**; 1*	OXF	NHA	SBO	DUB	IRP	ROU	BRI	DAR	RCH	DOV; 30	CLT; 31	NHA	CAR	MAR		48th	560	
1992	Labonte Motorsports	94	Olds	DAY	CAR	RCH	ATL	MAR	DAR	BRI	HCY	LAN	DUB	NZH	CLT	DOV; 3	ROU	MYB	GLN; 3	VOL	NHA; 37	TAL	IRP	ROU	MCH	NHA	BRI	DAR	RCH	DOV						46th	666	
1992	Labonte Motorsports	14	Olds																												CLT; 4	MAR	CAR; 13	HCY		46th	666	
1993	Labonte Motorsports	14	Chevy	DAY; 4	CAR; 39	RCH; 12	DAR; 3	BRI; 9	HCY	ROU	MAR	NZH	CLT; 37	DOV; 10	MYB	GLN; 2	MLW	TAL; 3	IRP; 3	MCH; 3	NHA; 29	BRI; 30	DAR; 18	RCH; 32	**DOV**; 26	ROU	CLT; 6	MAR; 30	CAR; 5	HCY	ATL; 13					20th	2399	
1994	Labonte Motorsports	14	Chevy	DAY; 4	CAR; 1	RCH; 6	ATL; 4	MAR; 1*	DAR; 37	HCY	BRI; 33	ROU	NHA; 20	NZH	CLT; 8	DOV; 2	MYB	GLN; 1*	MLW	SBO	TAL; 2	HCY	IRP	MCH; 35	BRI; 9	DAR; 13	RCH; 4	DOV; 9	CLT; 1	MAR; 6	CAR; 34					18th	2720	
1995	Labonte Motorsports	14	Chevy	DAY; 3	CAR; 3	RCH; 2	ATL; 16	NSV; 3	DAR; 32	BRI; 5	HCY	NHA; 21	NZH	CLT; 7	DOV; 36	MYB	**GLN**; 1	MLW	TAL; 15	SBO	IRP	MCH; 2	BRI; 5	DAR; 35	RCH; 5	DOV	CLT; 8	CAR; 26	HOM; 13							17th	2490	
1996	Labonte Motorsports	5	Chevy	DAY; 39	CAR; 9	RCH; 10	ATL; 1	NSV; 4	DAR; 3	BRI	HCY	NZH	CLT; 4	DOV; 3	SBO	MYB	GLN; 1	MLW	NHA; 2	TAL; 4	IRP	MCH; 3	BRI; 10	DAR; 1*	RCH; 10	DOV; 4	CLT; 15	CAR; 6	HOM							13th	2699	
1997	Labonte Motorsports	5	Chevy	DAY	CAR	RCH; 43	ATL; 10	LVS; 28	DAR	HCY	TEX; 18	BRI	NSV	TAL	NHA	NZH	CLT; 12	DOV; 8	SBO	GLN; 5	MLW	MYB	GTY; 26	IRP	MCH; 19	BRI; 31	DAR; 42	RCH	DOV; 9	CLT; 11	CAL; 18	CAR	HOM			33rd	1455	
1999	Labonte Motorsports	44	Chevy	DAY; 19	CAR	LVS; 14	ATL; 24	DAR; 4	TEX; 14	NSV	BRI; 4	TAL; 1	CAL; 22	NHA; 20	RCH; DNQ	NZH; 38	CLT; DNQ	DOV; 14	SBO	GLN	MLW	MYB	PPR	GTY	IRP	MCH; 36	BRI; 8	DAR; DNQ	RCH	DOV; 11	CLT; 33	CAR	MEM	PHO; 34	HOM	30th	1761	
2000	Labonte Motorsports	44	Chevy	DAY; 3	CAR	LVS	ATL; DNQ	DAR; DNQ	BRI; 35	TEX; DNQ	NSV	TAL; 8	CAL; DNQ	RCH	NHA	CLT	DOV; 21	SBO	MYB	GLN	MLW	NZH	PPR	GTY	IRP	MCH	BRI	DAR	RCH	DOV						64th	470	
2000	Labonte Motorsports	04	Chevy																												CLT; DNQ	CAR	MEM	PHO	HOM	64th	470	

==== SuperTruck Series ====
NASCAR SuperTruck Series results
Year	Team	No.	Make	1	2	3	4	5	6	7	8	9	10	11	12	13	14	15	16	17	18	19	20	NCTS	Pts	Ref
1995	Hendrick Motorsports	5	Chevy	PHO; 2	TUS	SGS	MMR	POR	EVG	I70	LVL	BRI	MLW	CNS	HPT; 3	IRP	FLM	**RCH**; 1	MAR	NWS	SON	MMR	PHO	37th	515	

^{*} Season still in progress
^{1} Ineligible for series points

=== 24 Hours of Daytona ===
(key)

24 Hours of Daytona results
Year	Class	No	Team	Car	Co-drivers	Laps	Position	Class Pos.
1981	GTX	44	(United States) Hagan Racing	Chevrolet Camaro	(United States) David Pearson (United States) Billy Hagan	50	61 ^{DNF}	22 ^{DNF}
1982	GTP	44	(United States) Hagan Racing	Chevrolet Camaro	(United States) Billy Hagan (United States) Gene Felton	295	38 ^{DNF}	13 ^{DNF}
1983	GTO	4	(United States) Hagan Racing	Chevrolet Camaro	(United States) Billy Hagan (United States) Lloyd Frink	467	20	9
1984	GTO	4	(United States) Hagan Racing	Chevrolet Camaro	(United States) Billy Hagan (United States) Gene Felton	588	6	1
1985	GTP	4	(United States) Lee Racing	Lola-Chevrolet	(United States) Lew Price (United States) Carson Baird (United States) Billy Hagan	160	51 ^{DNF}	19 ^{DNF}
1986	GTO	28	(United States) Texas Enterprises	Oldsmobile Calais	(United States) Phil Parsons (United States) Harry Gant	3	66 ^{DNF}	23 ^{DNF}
1987	GTO	28	(United States) Protofab Racing	Chevrolet Camaro	(United States) Greg Pickett (United States) Darrell Waltrip	410	31 ^{DNF}	12 ^{DNF}
2005	DP	44	(United States) Doran Racing	Pontiac Doran DP	(Denmark) Jan Magnussen (United States) Bryan Herta (United States) Bobby Labonte	675	9 ^{DNF}	9 ^{DNF}

== See also ==
- Iron man
- Labonte Motorsports
- List of all-time NASCAR Cup Series winners
- List of NASCAR All-Star Race drivers
- List of NASCAR Cup Series champions
- List of people from Texas
- NASCAR's 75 Greatest Drivers

Sporting positions
Preceded by Bobby Allison; Jeff Gordon	NASCAR Cup Series Champion; 1984; 1996	Succeeded by Darrell Waltrip; Jeff Gordon
Preceded by Al Unser Jr.	IROC Champion; IROC XIII (1989)	Succeeded by Dale Earnhardt
Achievements
Preceded by Dale Earnhardt; Mark Martin	NASCAR All-Star Race; 1988; 1999	Succeeded by Rusty Wallace; Dale Earnhardt Jr.
Preceded by Neil Bonnett	Busch Clash Winner; 1985	Succeeded by Dale Earnhardt
Preceded by David Pearson; Jeff Gordon	Southern 500 Winner; 1980; 2003	Succeeded by Neil Bonnett; Jimmie Johnson
